= Michael Applebaum =

Canadian politician

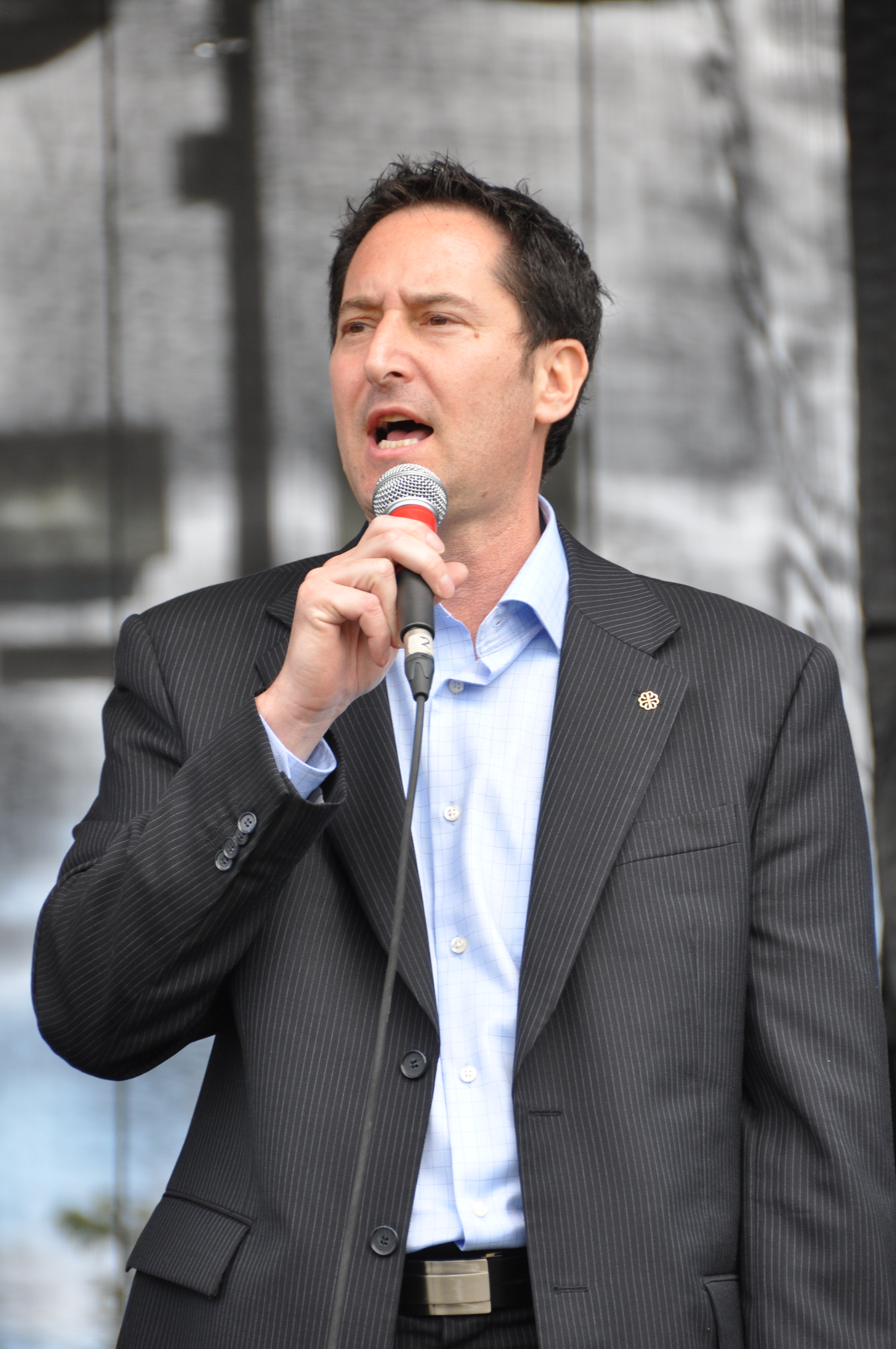

42nd Mayor of Montreal
- In office November 16, 2012 – June 18, 2013
- Preceded by: Jane Cowell-Poitras (acting)
- Succeeded by: Jane Cowell-Poitras (acting)

Borough mayor for Côte-des-Neiges–Notre-Dame-de-Grâce and Montreal City Councillor
- In office January 1, 2002 – November 21, 2012
- Preceded by: Position created
- Succeeded by: Lionel Perez

Chair of the Montreal Executive Committee
- In office April 6, 2011 – November 21, 2012
- Preceded by: Gérald Tremblay
- Succeeded by: Laurent Blanchard

Montreal City Councillor for Notre-Dame-de-Grâce
- In office November 6, 1994 – December 31, 2001
- Preceded by: Claudette Demers-Godley
- Succeeded by: Position abolished

Personal details
- Born: Michael Mark Applebaum; February 10, 1963 (age 63)
- Party: Parti des Montréalais (1994–1995); Independent (1995–1998); Nouveau Montréal (1998–2001); Union Montréal (2001–2012); Independent (2012–2013)
- Spouse: Merle Applebaum
- Occupation: Businessman, Real estate agent

Michael Mark Applebaum (born February 10, 1963) is a former Canadian politician who served as interim mayor of Montreal between his appointment by the city council on November 16, 2012, and his resignation on June 18, 2013. On June 17, 2013, he was arrested and indicted on 14 charges including fraud, conspiracy, breach of trust, and corruption in municipal affairs. He resigned the following day. On January 26, 2017, Applebaum was found guilty of eight of these charges, and subsequently sentenced to a year in prison and two years probation for extorting $60,000 worth of bribes from real estate developers as borough mayor in Côte-des-Neiges–Notre-Dame-de-Grâce between 2006 and 2012. On June 6, 2017, Applebaum was granted parole two months after serving one-sixth of his sentence when he admitted to his crimes.

Applebaum was first elected city councillor for Notre-Dame-de-Grâce on November 6, 1994, as a member of the now defunct Parti des Montréalais. In 2001, he became a founding member of the Union Montréal party and rose to prominence as part of Mayor Gérald Tremblay's administration, serving as borough mayor of Côte-des-Neiges–Notre-Dame-de-Grâce from January 1, 2002, to November 21, 2012, and becoming chair of the city's powerful executive committee in 2011. By 2006, he operated a "stratagem of corruption" in the borough and was investigated by UPAC, Quebec's anti-corruption police force. He was appointed interim mayor by the city council after leaving the party as increased scrutiny of corruption within the administration prompted Tremblay's resignation.

== Biography ==
Applebaum was born into an Orthodox Jewish family in Montreal on February 10, 1963, the third child of Ray and Moishe Applebaum. He was raised in Saint-Laurent and went to Winston Churchill High School, where he was a quiet student. He spent Grade 7 in a French immersion program at the English-language school but never mastered the language.

Applebaum always wanted to become a very wealthy businessman and never expected to go into politics. At the age of 13, he began working at his eponymous family shoe store founded by his grandfather in 1913. He studied commerce at Dawson College CEGEP, dropping out because he lost patience with a business teacher who regularly arrived late for class. He opened his first clothing boutique at 18 while at Dawson. He later opened a number of other businesses and took over the family shoe store.

Applebaum married in 1984. He and his wife Merle have three children.

He was involved in the Jewish community and was supportive of Israel. He always professed traditional Jewish values of family, working hard, and volunteering.

== City Councilor for Notre-Dame-de-Grâce (1994–2002) ==
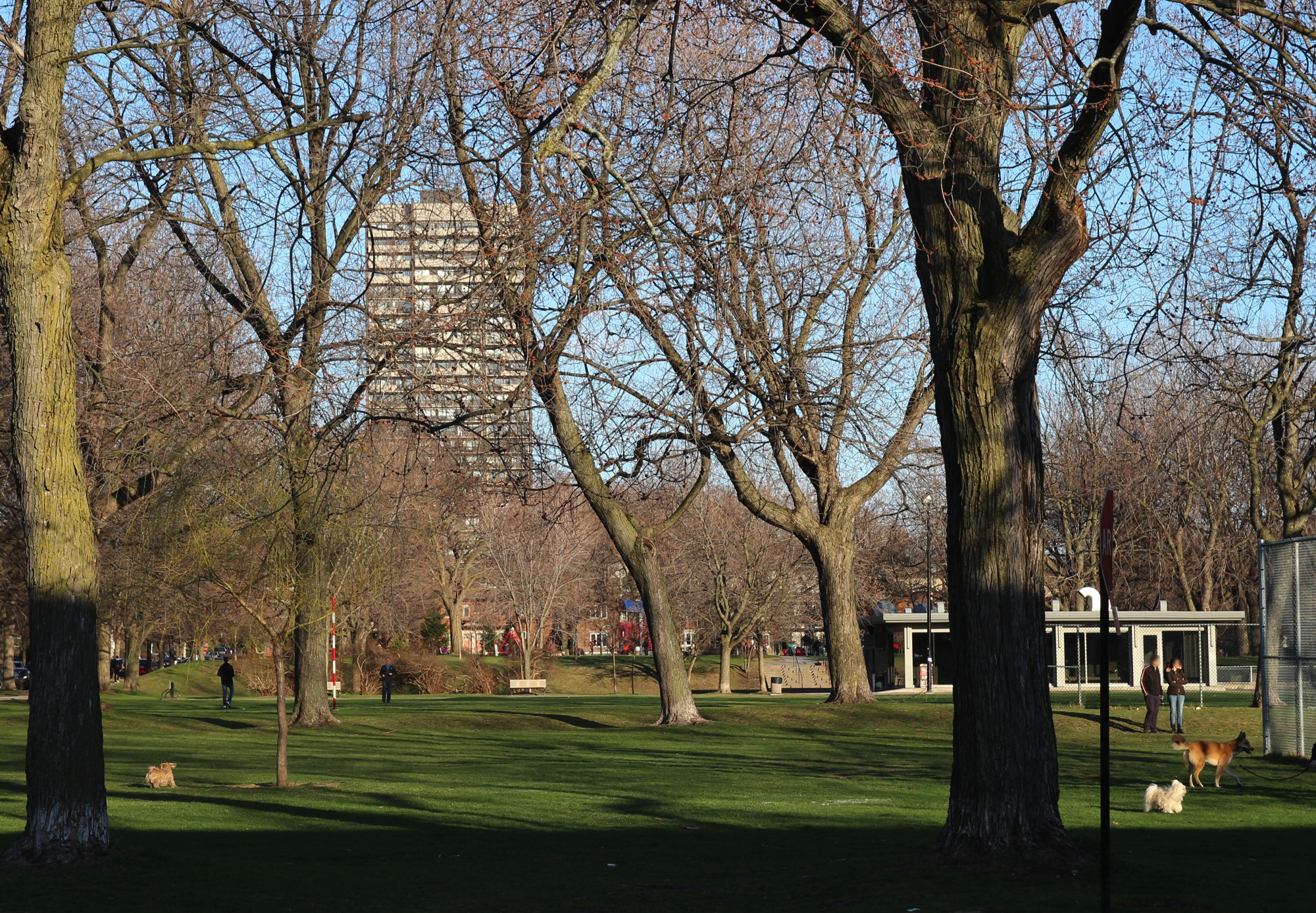
MacDonald Park, Snowdon, Montreal in April 2016

In 1994, Applebaum became known locally as "the rink activist" for campaigning to save a popular local outdoor hockey rink from closure at MacDonald Park in his Snowdon neighbourhood. He negotiated a compromise solution that had the city maintain the installation while local volunteers maintained the ice.

Later that year, he was elected city councillor by a margin of 31 votes in the former Notre-Dame-de-Grâce district of Montreal as a member of Jérôme Choquette's Parti des Montréalais. In 1998, he was re-elected by a large margin as a member of Nouveau Montréal, an opposition slate headed by former Montreal police chief Jacques Duchesneau. As a councillor, he relinquished his businesses and became a real estate agent at the Royal LePage realty firm to supplemented his low public salary. He maintained a brisk, focused business, selling 48 properties in his first year alone.

Applebaum campaigned ceaselessly on cutting government waste. He once tracked down a blue-collar worker who spent a day hiding in a luncheonette while collecting $21 an hour. He emphasized the fiscal responsibility and integrity that came with his business experience: "I've been in business, and it doesn't matter if you steal a dollar or you steal $100,000. You're not allowed to take a penny."

== Borough Mayor for Côte-des-Neiges–Notre-Dame-de-Grâce (2002–2012) ==
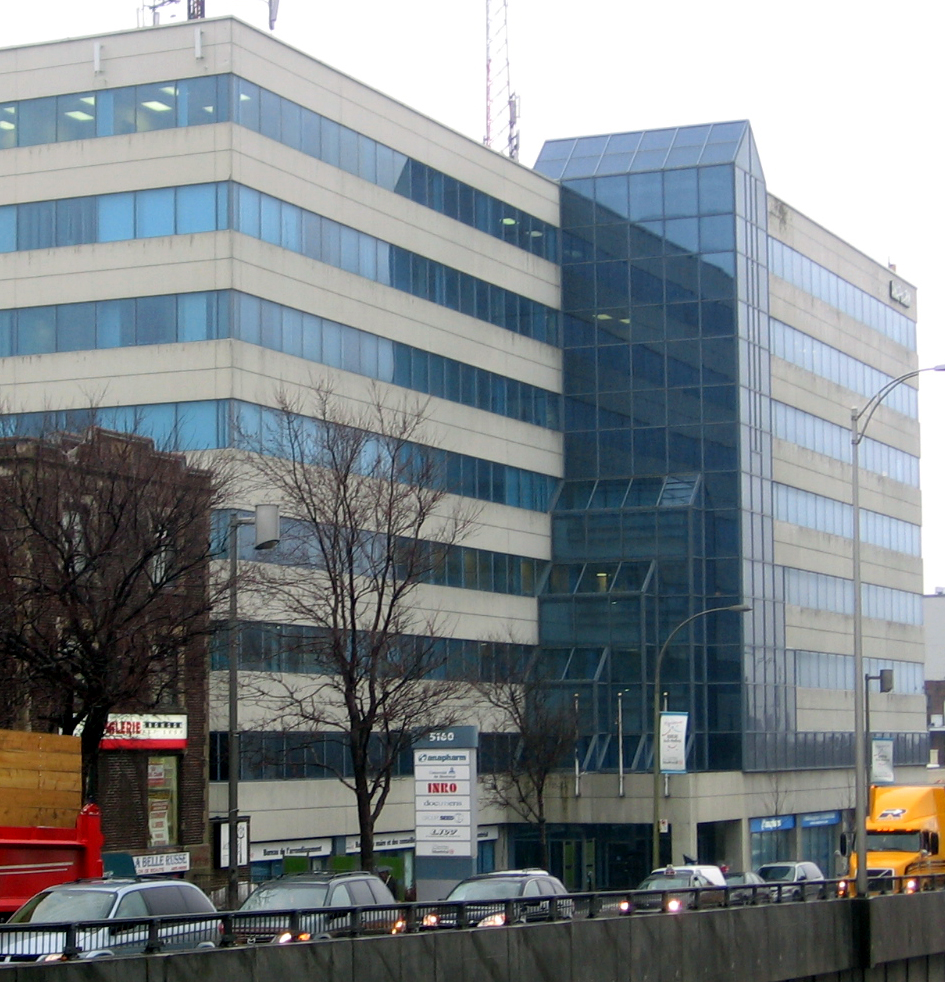
Borough hall of Côte-des-Neiges–Notre-Dame-de-Grâce in February 2009

In 2001, Applebaum joined other city councillors in forming the Union Montreal party under mayoral candidate Gérald Tremblay, a businessman and former Quebec Liberal cabinet minister. Applebaum and Tremblay went on to win the 2001 election on a platform of halting the forced merger of Montreal with suburban municipalities and decentralizing power to newly created Montreal boroughs during the 2002–06 municipal reorganization of Montreal. In 2002, Mayor Tremblay would appoint Applebaum to the newly created position of borough mayor for Côte-des-Neiges–Notre-Dame-de-Grâce. He also chaired of the borough's zoning committee (in French, Comité consultatif d'urbanisme) or CCU. They were reelected handily in 2005 and 2009, each with almost 50% of the vote.

By 2002, Applebaum's overall remuneration for committee work and expenses had grown to $102,868. Fellow councillors Jeremy Searle and Francine Senécal publicly criticized Applebaum in 2005 and 2008 for a potential conflict of interest over his continued work as a real estate agent and property manager while also sitting on the borough's secretive CCU (zoning committee). Applebaum once threatened to sue a citizen who pointed out that he should give up his real estate job if he wanted to sit on the CCU. He only gave up his realtor job and CCU position upon being appointed as a full member of the Montreal Executive Committee in 2009. Applebaum also repeatedly rejected proposals from councillor Warren Allmand to open CCU meetings to the public and to provide documentation on CCU zoning recommendations to the public before being adopted by the borough council. Allmand, formerly both the member of Parliament for NDG and Solicitor General of Canada, decried the lack of transparency in borough rezoning procedures. Councillors would often not know what they were voting on because they did not have time to review the CCU's complex zoning recommendations.

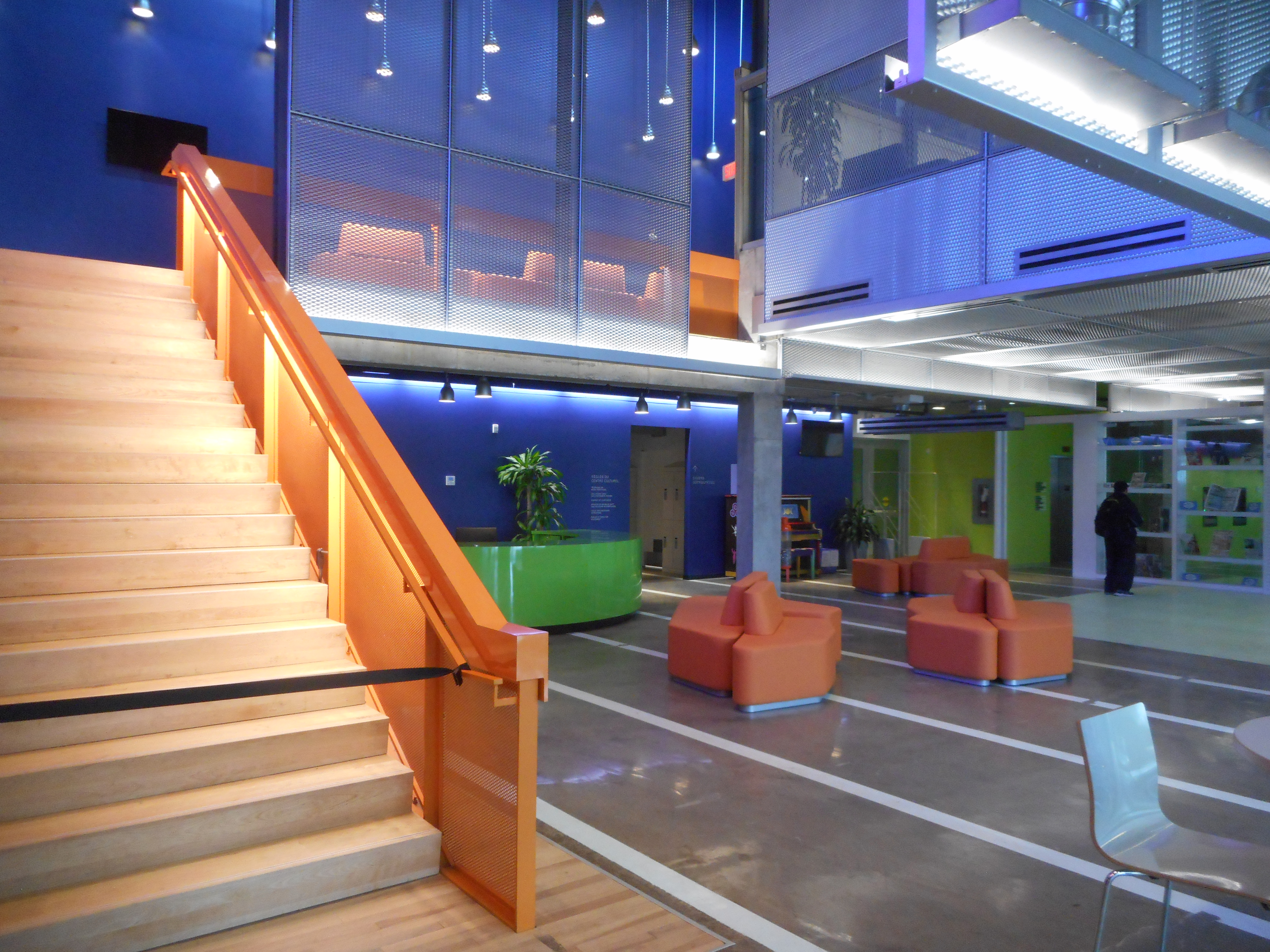
Notre-Dame-de-Grâce Cultural Centre in May 2016

Applebaum found himself at odds with community groups over a number of public works projects in Benny Park in the underserved Loyola district of the borough. Local residents believed that the construction of a sports complex, a community health centre, and a cultural centre was eating into too much park green space.

In 2007, the borough council moved already approved plans for a sports center on the residential development of Benny Farm across the street to Benny Park because of lack of space. Residents supported the construction of a sports complex but objected to the new location and the rezoning of the entire park for institutional construction, arguing it would make the greenspace a target for further development. In 2009, construction on the sports center began and plans for an ultra-modern library in the same park announced, further angering residents concerned about Green Space. The sports centre would open in 2011.

The closure of the Fraser-Hickson Library in 2007 also proved contentious. The foundation that owned and ran the spacious stone library requested $4 million in public money to help renovate the site. Despite a petition with 13,000 signatures and a tradition of volunteers to keep the library running, Applebaum refused the idea arguing that it would be more cost-effective to include a library in the cultural centre. In the 2009 election, opposition Vision Montreal candidate David Hanna accused Applebaum of neglecting to save the old library.Although signs announcing the construction of the new facility went up before the 2009 municipal election, construction did not begin until 2013. Applebaum explained delays by the city's careful review of technical documents to ensure that bids for the project do not come in higher than expected. The new building opened to positive reviews in 2016, four years behind schedule.

Residents expressed similar environmental concerns in 2011 about zoning for a parking lot at a planned community health centre (CLSC) to be built by the province across the road from the park would eat up greenspace and cause traffic problems. Construction on the community health centre began in 2012.

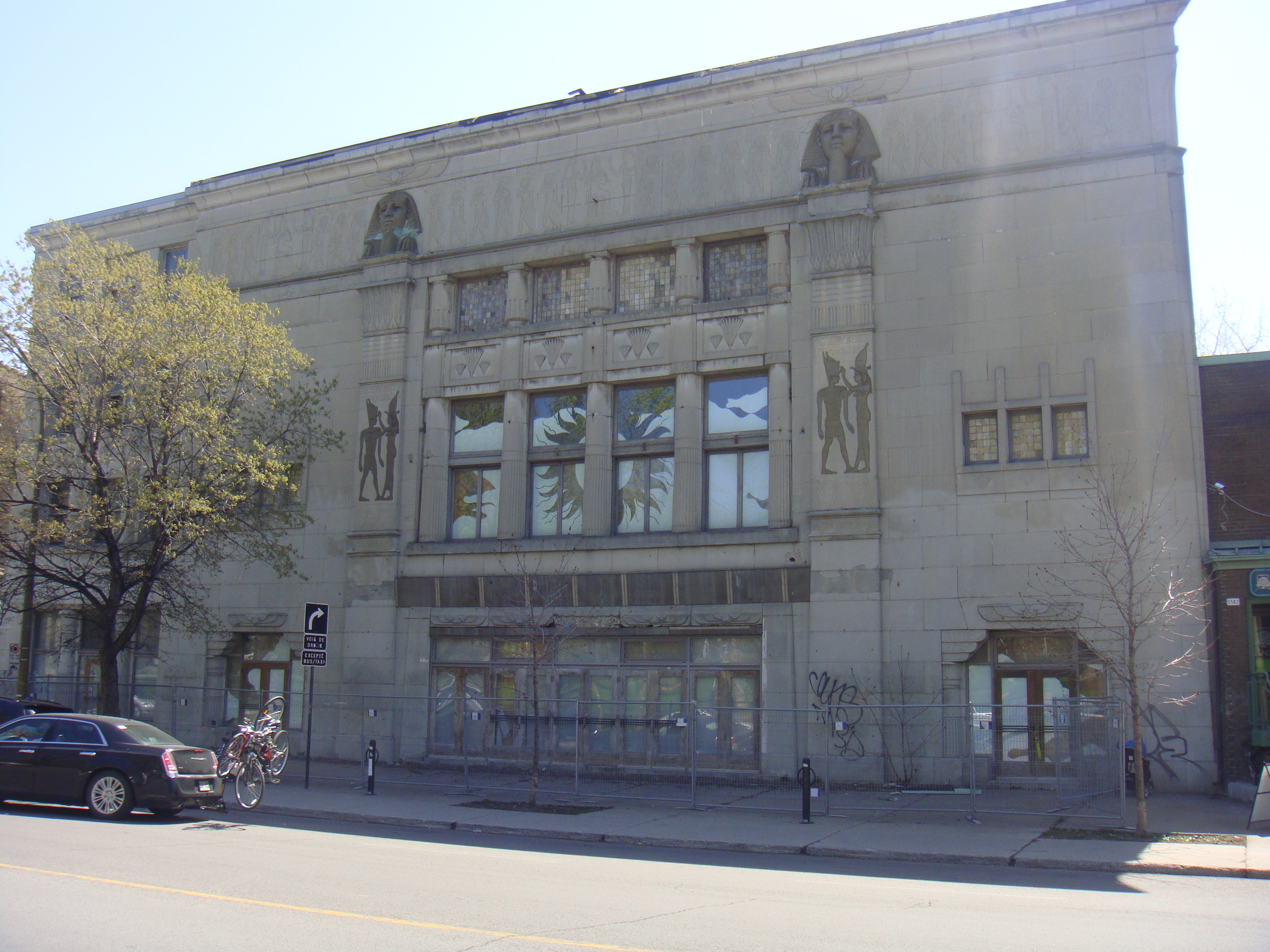
Empress Theatre in May 2015

Applebaum also alienated community groups looking to revitalize the Empress Theatre, a heritage site owned by the borough and sitting unused since a 1992 fire. In 2010, provincial funding to revitalize the theatre as a home for Geordie Productions, Black Theatre Workshop, and the McGill Music Conservatory fell through. Ownership reverted to the borough and the Applebaum administration set up a competitive bid process in 2012 that pitted community groups against each other. The winning bid went to Cinema NDG on condition that it find funding for its film house project. As of November 2017, after several deadline extensions, funding has yet to be secured by the project.

Supporters of Applebaum saw him as a hard-working borough mayor who always did his best to get things done, pointing to the construction of the Benny sports centre, a community health centre, and plans for a cultural centre in a badly under-served sector of the Loyola district. Local community groups saw him as thin-skinned and viciously partisan, running over all who he saw as political opponents. Applebaum rejected any criticism as always coming from the same "five or six or seven people" that ran against him in elections. In 2013, fellow Union Montreal councillor Warren Allmand said that he encouraged Applebaum to react more constructively to citizen suggestions, and was critical of Applebaum's perceiving differences of opinion as attempts to dislodge him from power.

=== Corruption ===
Applebaum was investigated by Quebec's anti-corruption police squad (UPAC) for being involved in a "stratagem of corruption" involving 10 real estate transactions and municipal contracts signed during his 2002-2012 tenure as borough mayor in Côte-des-Neiges–Notre-Dame-de-Grâce.

As borough mayor, Applebaum conspired with his aides, fellow councillors, and municipal officials to extort illegal campaign contributions, bribes and kickbacks from real estate promoters and construction firms in exchange for zoning changes and municipal contracts in his borough.

He was arrested at his home on June 17, 2013, on 14 charges related to two of these investigations; he was found guilty on January 8, 2017, on 8 charges, including fraud against the government, breach of trust, conspiracy, and corruption in municipal affairs.

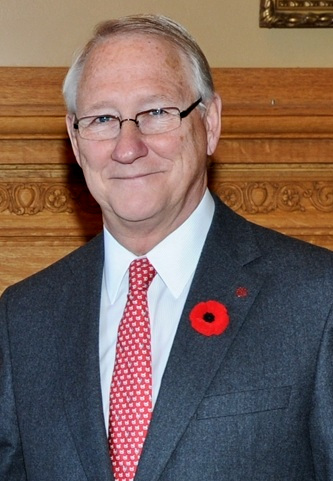
Mayor Gérald Tremblay in November 2011

Applebaum's crimes were part of a nexus of corruption involving bid-rigging for municipal contracts by large construction firms (some with links to the Mafia) in Montreal-area cities in exchange for bribes and kickbacks. Major players included Tony Accurso, owner of Simard-Beaudry Construction in Montreal, who paid for vacations of municipal officials on his giant yacht. He was also part of a straw-man financing scheme for municipal and provincial political parties, reimbursing company employees for political donations to circumvent Quebec campaign financing law banning companies from contributing to political parties. Large construction companies like Dessau, SNC-Lavalin, CIMA, Genivar and SM also were involved in these schemes.

In Montreal, this system would be harnessed to fill Union Montreal party election funds and corrupt municipal officials in Mayor Gerald Tremblay's administration. Chief Union Montreal fundraiser since 2004, Bernard Trépanier was known as "Mr. 3%" because he was purported by Montreal construction bosses to skim 3% off government contracts for Union Montreal party funds. Frank Zampino, Mayor Tremblays right-hand man in Union Montreal and president of Montreal's powerful Executive Committee that controlled municipal finances, was responsible for awarding Montreal's largest ever $4 billion waterworks project. Corruption in the awarding of contracts associated with this project, including visits to Accurso's yacht during the bidding process in 2007, led to the arrest and trial of Zampino and Trépanier on corruption charges.

Applebaum was remarkably candid with his aides about his reasons for soliciting bribes: "I am not an angel ... We got to make a living." He also justified soliciting illegal campaign contributions when approaching developers in his borough: "Elections aren't cheap".

By 2006, Applebaum was instructing his newly hired aide Hugo Tremblay to sell tickets to Union Montreal party cocktail fundraisers to promoters seeking zoning changes for their real estate projects. A box called "the hat" would be circulated at these events to collect outrightly illegal anonymous cash donations. The "pret-nom" (borrowed-name, straw man, proxy-name) scheme would be used to make it appear that large donations from a single individual came from a number of people so as not to appear to exceed Quebec's individual legal donation limits of $100. Ticket stubs would be used by Applebaum to compile lists of donors and their phone numbers for extorting "extra political effort", Applebaum's euphemism for bribes; Applebaum would then arrange to have his aide solicit and collect the bribes in cash and split the money in his car.

Applebaum conspired meticulously to use cash in these transactions. He instructed his aide to never discuss the cash exchanges, to accept illegal payments in a car or anonymous locations, to leave packages or envelopes in the car for a while until opening them, and to turn off any cellphones when making cash transactions. He left no paper trail, believing: "In order to charge you, [they] got to see the money."

== Executive committee (2002–2012) ==
Between 2002 and 2009, Applebaum rose through the ranks of Mayor Gérald Tremblay's government, being handed increasing responsibilities. In 2002, he was named an associate member of the Montreal Executive Committee to help decentralize services to the newly created borough of Côte-des-Neiges–Notre-Dame-de-Grâce. After the 2005 elections, he was appointed president of the commission of transport, the environment, and infrastructure.

Mayor Gérald Tremblay made Applebaum a full member of the executive committee in January 2009, assuming the sports and recreation portfolio and the difficult portfolio of snow removal. He quickly became vice-chair.

Applebaum became the second most powerful person in Montreal on April 6, 2011, when he was promoted by Tremblay to chair of the executive committee and given control over the city's finances. He replaced Claude Dauphin who resigned over allegations of spying on top bureaucrats as Tremblay's government faced increased scrutiny for corruption. His other responsibilities included urban planning and buildings, borough relations, human resources, administrative services, and corporate communications. Applebaum shrugged off the administration's problems as media exaggerations and set a financial goal of cutting the city budget of $4.5 billion by $170 million and holding tax increases to the rate of inflation. He attributed his promotion to the sound management of his borough.

He resigned from his position as chair of the executive committee on November 9, 2012, although he retained his position as mayor of Côte-des-Neiges–Notre-Dame-de-Grâce borough.

== Mayoralty and Corruption investigations (2012–2013) ==
Following Tremblay's resignation on November 5, 2012, Applebaum was believed to be a strong contender to win Union Montréal's nomination as its new mayoral candidate. However, he was passed over in favour of councilor Richard Deschamps.

An anonymous colleague told reporters that Applebaum's candidacy had been rejected because his French language skills were not strong enough to be mayor of an 80 percent francophone city. However, several francophone councillors disputed that claim, saying that Applebaum speaks creditable French. Notably, Vision Montreal leader Louise Harel told The Gazette, "I wish I could speak English as well as [Applebaum] speaks French."

He subsequently left Union Montréal to sit as an independent councillor and submitted his name as an independent mayoral candidate. He argued that in light of the corruption crisis facing the city, notably among the ruling Union Montreal party, the interim mayor should be independent of party affiliation. In the final city council vote on November 16, 2012, Applebaum won 31 votes to Deschamps' 29. He won in part by reaching out more actively than Deschamps to the opposition Vision Montréal and Projet Montréal parties and the bloc of independent councillors who resigned from Union Montréal in the same period, most notably by promising to share seats on the Montreal Executive Committee in a non-partisan coalition. Applebaum pledged not to run for mayor in the 2013 municipal election, indicating that he would instead run for another term as borough mayor of Côte-des-Neiges–Notre-Dame-de-Grâce.

On November 19, 2012, Michael Applebaum was sworn in as interim mayor of Montreal at the Hall Honor at Montreal City Hall. In his acceptance speech, Applebaum promised to "erase this stain on our city" caused by the corruption of the outgoing Tremblay administration. He put forward a 100-day plan of property tax cuts, increased funding for public transit, and a freeze on public works projects.

In January 2013, Applebaum announced that the city was creating the EPIM, a municipal police squad to investigate political corruption in the city. The same day, Le Devoir reported that the Charbonneau Commission and UPAC were investigating Applebaum and had met with Applebaum to investigate his role as borough mayor in zoning modifications and real estate transactions in Notre-Dame-de-Grace. Applebaum acknowledged the meeting with UPAC and the Charbonneau Commission but denied he was being investigated and refused to disclose the topic of discussion.

Subsequent reports from le Devoir revealed that as a city councillor, Applebaum attended a Union Montreal fundraising event on August 28, 2003, along with Mayor Gérald Tremblay, Tremblay's brother Marcel, then also a city councillor, and Frank Zampino, then chairman of the city executive committee. The event was at the La Cantina restaurant on upper St. Laurent Blvd., which was frequented by members of the Rizzuto crime family, and owned by Federico Del Peschio, who was gunned down in the establishment's parking lot later in 2009. Le Devoir also identified one builder as Tony Magi, a developer with links to the Rizzuto crime family who had built a condo project on Upper Lachine Rd. in Notre-Dame-de-Grace. The original project required zoning changes opposed by the borough, with a modified version built with $3.4 million in subsidies from the city government. Applebaum again denied any wrongdoing and accused the media of a smear campaign. The fundraiser was organized by real estate developer Lee Lalli, who also had Mafia links and would become friends with Applebaum. Lalli said the evening brought together 20 entrepreneurs who worked for the city and paid $1,000 each to collect $20,000 for Union Montreal. Union Montreal would only declare $12,500. Lalli had also purchased the parcel of land in 1999 for $335 000, applied for zoning changes and the subsidies, and flipped it to Magi in 2005 for $3.2 million, almost matching the city subsidy.

On February 19, 2013, 125 police officers from UPAC armed with warrants raided 9 locations in Montreal, including Montreal City Hall and 5 borough offices, including in the Cote-des-Neiges-NDG borough office governed for years by Applebaum. Police said that they spoke with both Applebaum and former mayor Gerald Tremblay. Applebaum continued to deny that he was a target of these investigations.

On March 5, 2013, a Radio-Canada investigative report claimed that UPAC was investigating Applebaum's role in a complex land swap for an old orphanage at the corner of boulevard Décarie and chemin de la Côte-Saint-Luc in 2007 involving Lee Lalli and Tony Magi. The report suggested that Applebaum had let Lalli know that the borough was interested in building a borough city hall on the site, an allegation confirmed by Lalli but denied by Applebaum. The Charbonneau Commission had police-taped recordings capturing a 2003 conversation between Vito Rizzuto, then head of the Montreal Mafia, attempting to broker a deal between Lalli and Magi, with the help of councillor Saulie Zajdel to change the zoning. Lalli would eventually flip the land to build a seniors residence and pharmacy; he would also successfully sue Radio-Canada for defamation for linking him to the mafia.

On March 19, 2013, the vice-president of Dessau, a large Montreal engineering firm with many government contracts, testified before the Charbonneau Commission, exposing a system of bribery with the city of Montreal to ensure city contracts. He described Frank Zampino, president of the executive committee before Applebaum, as the architect. One of Dessau's subsidiaries, Sogep, was involved in bribing Applebaum in 2010 to win the contract to manage the borough's new sports complex in N.D.G. for three years. In response, on April 26, 2013, Applebaum announced that all companies confessing to bid-rigging at the Charbonneau Commission would be banned from Montreal municipal contracts, regardless of any immunity granted by the Charbonneau Commission. Editorials in the financial community pointed out that such bans made little sense as they punished companies that come clean about past corruption while allowing companies that don't come forward to operate as normal.

== Corruption arrest and trial ==
Applebaum was arrested by Quebec's anti-corruption unit UPAC at his home on June 17, 2013. He initially faced 14 charges including fraud, conspiracy, breach of trust, and corruption in municipal affairs. Officials said they related to real estate projects between 2006 and 2011 when Applebaum served as borough mayor. Charges were also simultaneously laid against former city councillor Saulie Zajdel and Jean Yves Bisson, a city bureaucrat.

According to an arrest warrant filed in court, Applebaum allegedly engaged in two separate criminal conspiracies, the nature of which officials did not initially disclose. However, Radio-Canada reported that they involve the demolition of a residential building and the construction of condominiums, and link Applebaum to a Laval-based engineering firm central to the municipal corruption testimony being heard at the Charbonneau commission. In addition, Radio-Canada, citing police sources, said the police were investigating a $50,000 payment to Applebaum as well as a $15,000 payment made to Zajdel.

On June 18, 2013, Applebaum announced his resignation as mayor of Montreal, maintaining that the allegations against him were unfounded. He hired Marcel Danis, a criminal lawyer and former member of Parliament, as his defence attorney.

In October 2013, charges against him were widened to encompass ten major real estate transactions between 2002 and 2012 in Côte-des-Neiges. His preliminary hearing was scheduled for June 2015, immediately before Zajdel's trial.

On January 26, 2017, Applebaum was found guilty of eight corruption-related charges.

At the February 15, 2017 sentencing hearing, the prosecution asked for two years of prison out of a possible five. The defence asked for either a suspended sentence or a mixed sentence with probation, community work, or non-consecutive jail time.

On March 30, 2017, Applebaum was sentenced to 12 months in prison and two years of probation. The judge said that Applebaum had committed "very serious" crimes.

== Since conviction ==
On June 6, 2017, Applebaum was granted parole after serving two months or one-sixth of his sentence after admitting to his crimes and expressing remorse for his criminal actions at his parole hearings. He was released on condition that he do 20 hours of community work per week.

In May 2017, the city of Montreal authorized lawyers to take court action to retrieve a $160,000 departure allowance that Applebaum received from the city when he resigned as mayor. In June 2018, changes in provincial regulation has allowed the city to try and retrieve a $108,000 departure bonus paid out to Applebaum as well. In 2020, Quebec Superior Court ruled that Applebaum could keep a total of $268,000 because the new rules went into effect after Applebaum was convicted.

After Applebaum's conviction, the Organisme d’autoréglementation du courtage immobilier du Québec (OACIQ) revoked Applebaum's license to sell real estate in Quebec on April 30, 2017. It rejected Applebaum's application to reinstate the license when he got out on parole. In July 2018, Applebaum appealed the decision in Quebec Court, arguing that his crimes did not involve his real estate practice. Applebaum withdrew the court appeal in October 2018 when the judge refused to delay hearing of the case.

== Notes ==
- Applebaum was the first anglophone to hold the office (not counting interim officeholders) since the end of James John Guerin's term in 1912.
- He was also the first Jew to assume the office of mayor of Montreal.

== Electoral record (partial) ==
2009 Montreal municipal election: Borough mayor, Côte-des-Neiges–Notre-Dame-de-Grâce
Party	Candidate	Votes	%	±%
Union Montreal	Michael Applebaum	17,409	52.19	+4.08
Projet Montréal	Carole Dupuis	8,678	26.01	–
Vision Montreal	Brenda Mae Paris	5,686	17.04	−9.28
Montréal Ville-Marie	Jacqueline Sommereyns	1,586	4.75	–
Total valid votes		33,359	96.86	–
Total rejected ballots		1,082	3.14	–
Turnout		34,441	36.09	–
Electors on the lists		95,431	–	–
Source: Election results, 2009, City of Montreal.

2005 Montreal municipal election: Borough Mayor, Côte-des-Neiges–Notre-Dame-de-Grâce
Party	Candidate	Votes	%
Citizens Union	Michael Applebaum	14,646	48.11
Vision Montreal	Sonya Biddle	8,013	26.32
Team Jeremy Searle	Jeremy Searle	5,949	19.54
Independent	Alexandre Montagano	1,837	6.03
Total valid votes		30,445	–
Source: Election results, 1833-2005 (in French), City of Montreal.
