= Brenda Paris =

Brenda Mae Paris is a politician and activist in Montreal, Quebec, Canada. She is a prominent figure in Montreal's black community and has sought election to Montreal city council on two occasions.

== Early life and private career ==
Paris was born in Montreal's Little Burgundy neighbourhood. She has a bachelor's degree in applied social sciences from Concordia University and is certified as a Family Life Educator from the same institution.

Paris worked in student development at Dawson College for many years before her retirement in 2007. She has served on several committees of the government of Quebec, including the Conseil des relations interculturelles. In the early 2000s, she was executive director of Montreal's Black Community Resource Centre, which provides services for black anglophone Montrealers.

In February 2002, Paris was appointed as a citizen director of the Montreal Transit Corporation, representing the interests of transit users. Later in the same year, she was appointed to a transit sub-committee on ethnic and social diversity, which was created following reports of racial profiling by transit police. She remained a director of the transit corporation until 2009.

Paris has served as a regional director of the National Organization of Immigrant and Visible Minority Women of Canada.

== Politician ==
Paris first ran for city council in the 2005 municipal election as a candidate of the governing Montreal Island Citizens Union (MICU) in Saint-Henri–La Petite-Bourgogne–Pointe-Saint-Charles. A newspaper report from the election described her as the only candidate of African descent to run for the party. During the campaign, she credited mayor Gérald Tremblay with bringing more members of Montreal's cultural communities into the city's workforce. On election day, she was narrowly defeated by Line Hamel of Vision Montreal.

Paris joined the executive committee of MICU in 2005 and was elected its president in April 2006. She was re-elected for a second term in 2007, after the party had renamed itself as Union Montreal.

Paris left Union Montreal to join Vision Montreal in August 2009, expressing concerns that the integrity of Tremblay's party had been called into question by "investigations into some questionable deals and practices." She ran as Vision Montreal's candidate for borough mayor of Côte-des-Neiges–Notre-Dame-de-Grâce in the 2009 municipal election, and, despite being regarded as a high-profile candidate, ultimately finished a distant third against Union Montreal incumbent Michael Applebaum. Some believe that Paris's poor showing was due to local opposition to Vision Montreal's leader Louise Harel; Harel is a noted Quebec sovereigntist, while most voters in Côte-des-Neiges–Notre-Dame-de-Grâce are supporters of Canadian federalism.

During the 2009 campaign, Harel described Paris as one of her principal anglophone advisers. The following year, Harel appointed Paris as Vision's critic on public transport and public security, with responsibility for communications with Montreal's anglophone communities. She held these positions until March 2011.

== Electoral record ==
2009 Montreal municipal election: Borough mayor, Côte-des-Neiges–Notre-Dame-de-Grâce
| Party | Candidate | Votes | % | ±% |
|---|---|---|---|---|
| Union Montreal | Michael Applebaum | 17,409 | 52.19 | +4.08 |
| Projet Montréal | Carole Dupuis | 8,678 | 26.01 | – |
| Vision Montreal | Brenda Mae Paris | 5,686 | 17.04 | −9.28 |
| Montréal Ville-Marie | Jacqueline Sommereyns | 1,586 | 4.75 | – |
| Total valid votes | | 33,359 | 96.86 | – |
| Total rejected ballots | | 1,082 | 3.14 | – |
| Turnout | | 34,441 | 36.09 | – |
| Electors on the lists | | 95,431 | – | – |
Source: Election results, 2009, City of Montreal.

2005 Montreal municipal election: Councillor, Saint-Henri–La Petite-Bourgogne–Pointe-Saint-Charles
| Party | Candidate | Votes | % |
|---|---|---|---|
| Vision Montreal | Line Hamel (incumbent) | 3,275 | 44.56 |
| Montreal Island Citizens Union | Brenda Paris | 2,792 | 37.99 |
| Projet Montréal | Nicole Cloutier | 1,283 | 17.46 |
| Total valid votes | | 7,350 | 100 |
Source: Election results, 2005, City of Montreal.
