= Mayor of Montreal =

- Coat of arms of Montreal

- Flag of Montreal

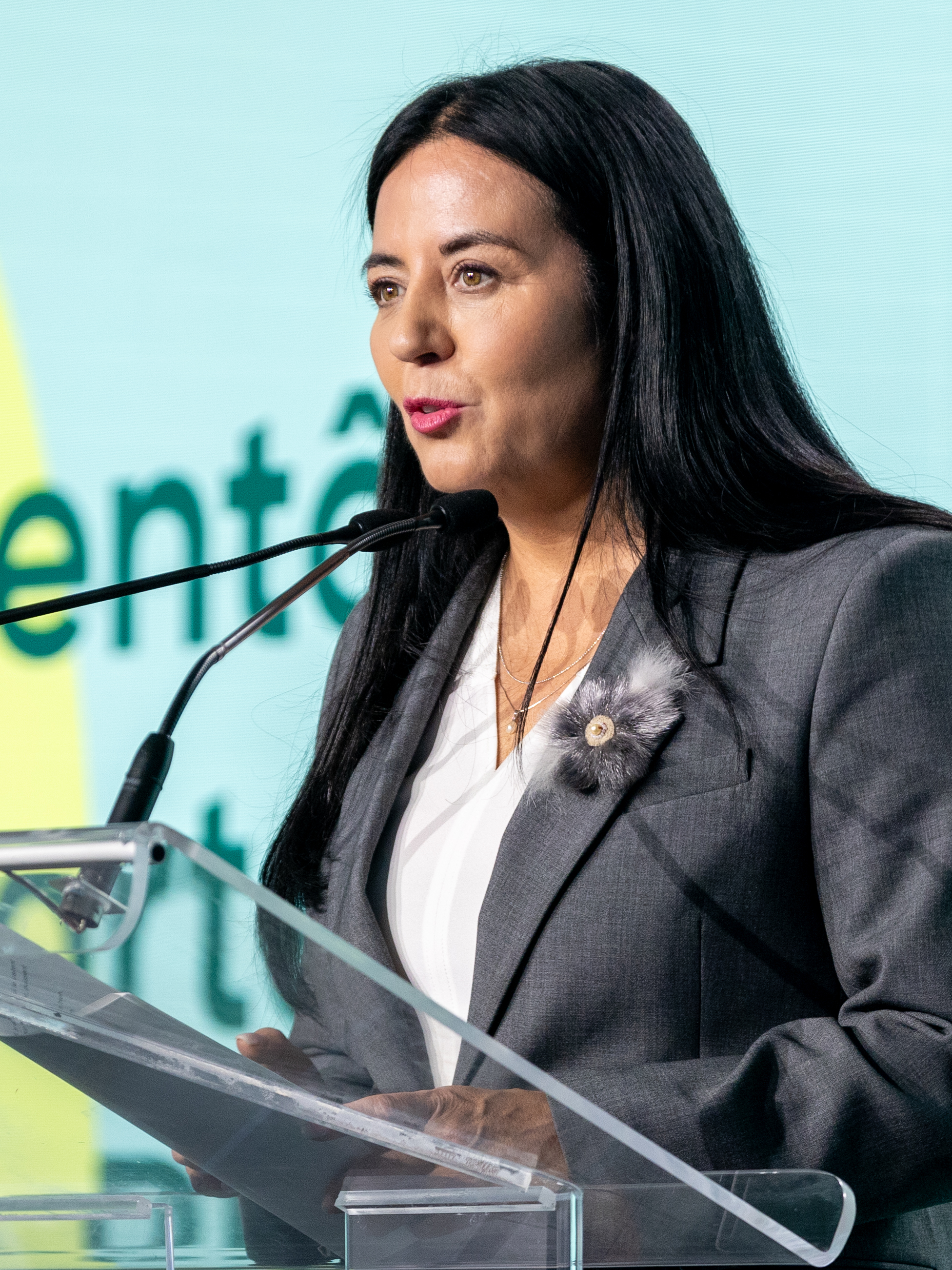
- Incumbent; Soraya Martinez Ferrada since November 13, 2025
- Style: Her Worship; Mayor (informal)
- Member of: City Council
- Reports to: Montreal City Council
- Residence: Montreal
- Seat: Montreal City Hall
- Appointer: Directly elected by residents of Montreal
- Term length: Four years, renewable
- Inaugural holder: Jacques Viger
- Formation: June 5, 1833; 193 years ago
- Website: ville.montreal.qc.ca

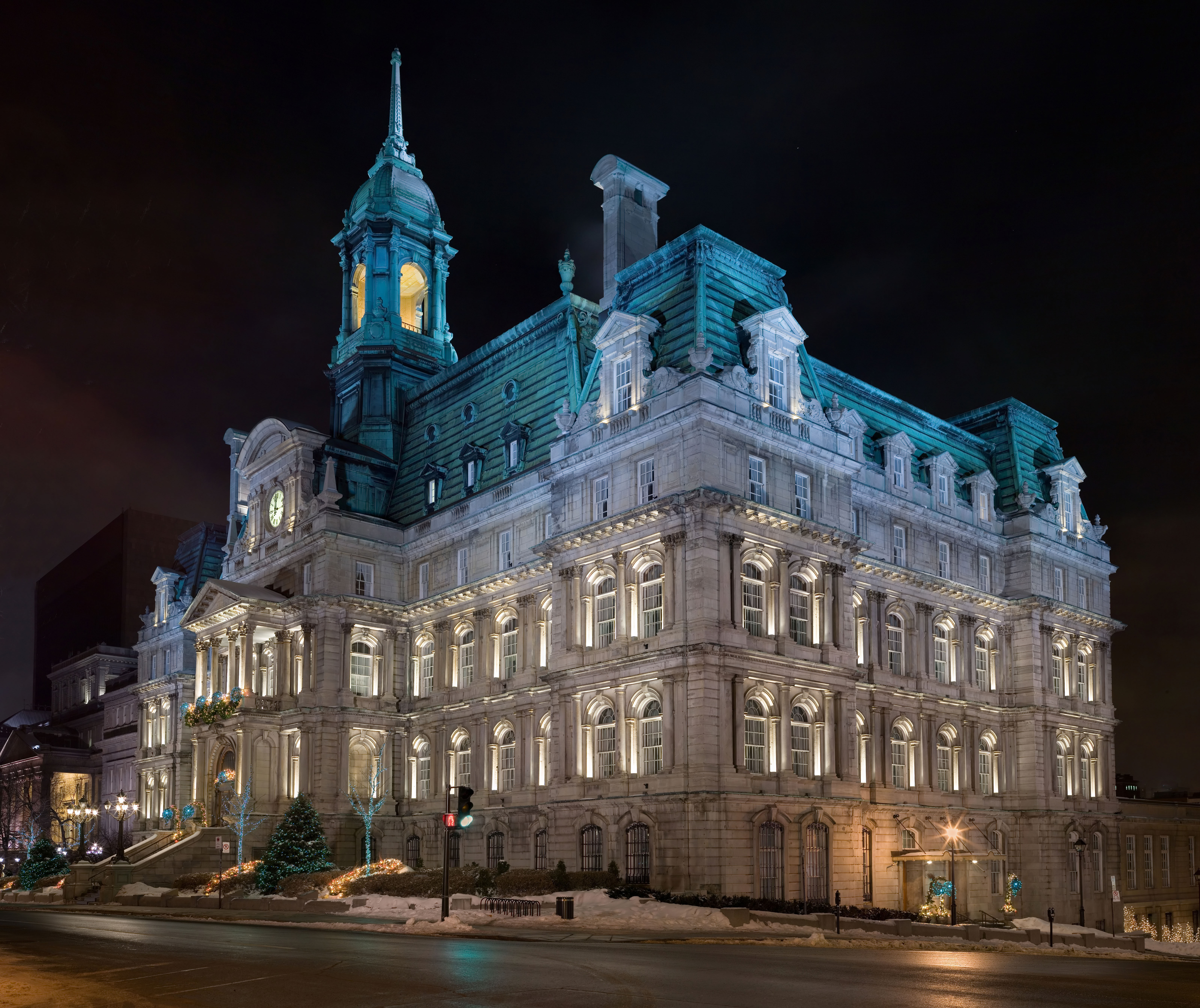
Montreal City Hall

The mayor of Montreal is head of the executive branch of the Montreal City Council. The current mayor is Soraya Martinez Ferrada, who was elected into office in 2025. The office of the mayor administers all city services, public property, police and fire protection, most public agencies, and enforces all city and provincial laws within Montreal, Quebec. The mayor is directly elected by citizens, by a plurality of votes, for a four-year term (unless a vacancy occurs). The mayor's office is located in Montreal City Hall.

== History of the office ==
The first poll in the history of Montreal was held on the day the first charter of Montreal came into effect – June 3, 1833.

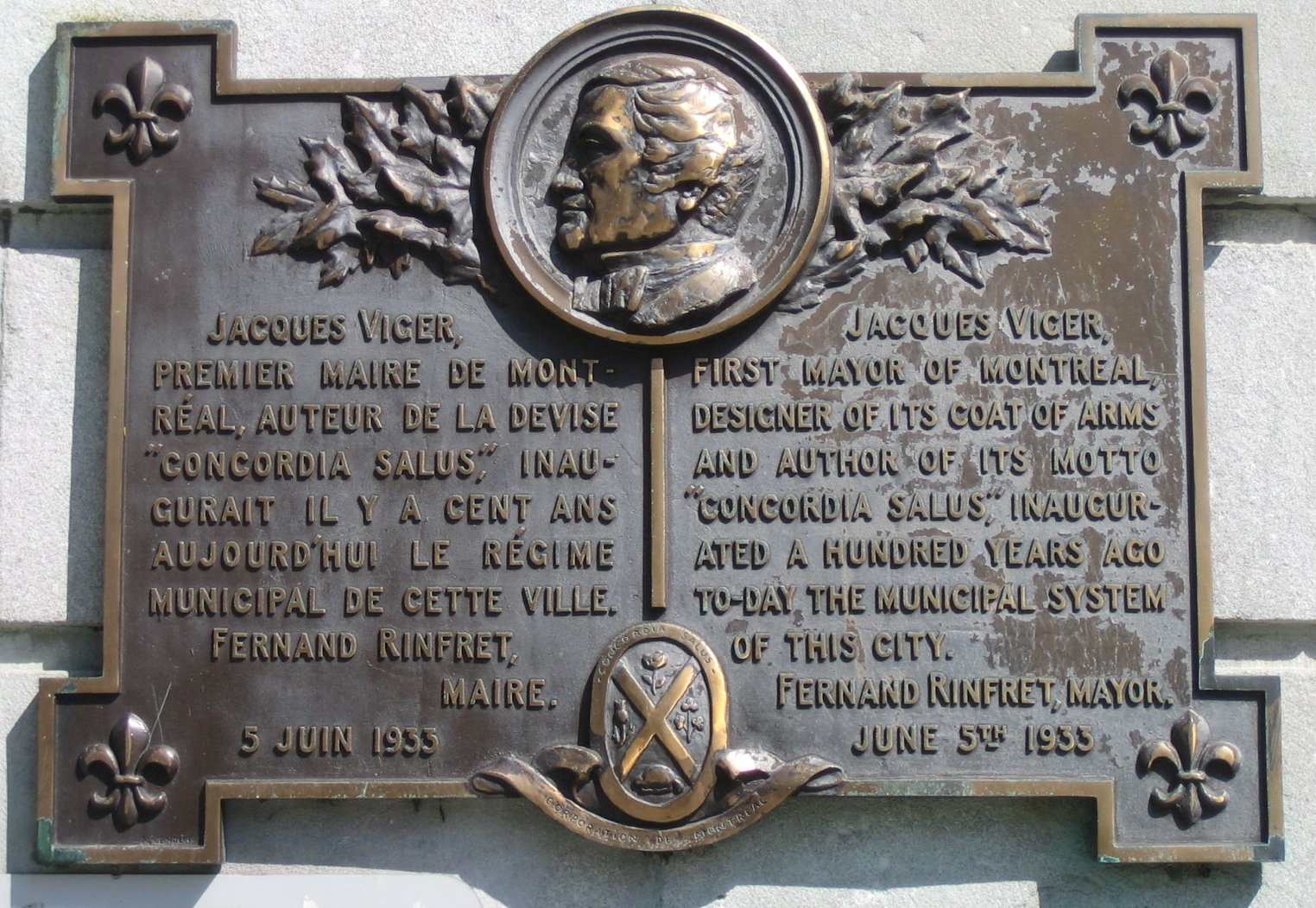
A commemorative plaque, Vauquelin Square

On June 5, 1833 city council chose Jacques Viger as the first mayor of Montreal. The same day that Jacques Viger was elected mayor of Montreal, city council adopted a series of administrative by-laws, as well as ordinances to improve cleanliness in city districts. Andrew Steven Fox was appointed as the mayor's medical advisor.

The first coat of arms of Montreal and the motto "Concordia Salus" were adopted on July 19, 1833 as proposed by Viger, incorporating the emblems of the main ethnic groups in the city. The rose represented England, the thistle referred to Scotland, the clover corresponded to Ireland, and the beaver, the French Canadians; this latter was replaced by the fleur de lys in 1938.

In 1851 city council decided to provide the first magistrate of the city with a sumptuous chain; it is an old English practice. The coat of arms of Montreal figured prominently in the centre of the gold chain. On October 2, 1851, that chain was passed on to Mayor Charles Wilson at a ceremony presided over by Lord Elgin, Governor General of Canada. The chain is now worn by each new mayor at the swearing-in ceremony. At the election in February 1852, Wilson became the first mayor elected by citizens.

Starting with the 2009 Montreal municipal election, the mayor of Montreal is also the mayor of the borough of Ville-Marie.

On November 5, 2017, Valérie Plante became the first woman to be elected as Mayor of Montreal.

== Vacancies ==
If an incumbent mayor dies in office or resigns, the office is temporarily assumed by the deputy mayor, a position which rotates among different city councillors during the course of a normal council term. In 2012 councillor Jane Cowell-Poitras became acting mayor of the city following the resignation of Gérald Tremblay following allegations from the Charbonneau Commission.

Under provincial law governing municipal election processes, if the vacancy occurs more than one year before the next regularly scheduled municipal election, then a by-election is held to choose the replacement mayor. However, if the vacancy occurs less than a year before the next election, council has up to 30 days to hold an internal vote to choose one of its own members as the new mayor until the regular election. As Tremblay's resignation occurred less than a year before the 2013 municipal election, his formal successor Michael Applebaum was chosen by the latter method, in a vote which took place on November 16. Applebaum resigned on June 18, 2013, one day after his arrest for corruption, and Cowell-Poitras again became acting mayor until Laurent Blanchard was selected in a council vote on June 25.

== See also ==
- List of mayors of Montreal
- List of leaders of the Official Opposition
- Timeline of Montreal history
- History of Montreal
- History of Quebec
- List of governors of Montreal
