= Tony Accurso =

Canadian businessman, entrepreneur

Antonio Accurso
- Born: Antonio Accurso; November 8, 1951 (age 74); Montreal, Quebec, Canada
- Education: Concordia University, (BEng)
- Occupation: Businessman
- Convictions: conspiracy to commit acts of corruption, conspiracy to commit fraud, fraud of over $5,000, municipal corruption, and aiding in a breach of trust
- Penalty: Four years’ imprisonment (2018)

Antonio Accurso (born November 8, 1951) is a Canadian businessman who specializes in the construction sector. He directly and indirectly controls several construction businesses as well as bars, restaurants, movie theatres, shopping centres, and the Hippo Club in Laval.

== Beginnings and political ties ==
Tony Accurso was born on November 8, 1951, in Montreal, and studied civil engineering at Concordia University in Montreal. After his Italian-born father's death in 1982, Tony Accurso took over his business, Louisbourg Construction Ltd.

Accurso heads Simard-Beaudry Construction, one of the leading construction companies in Quebec. Accurso also controls many other companies, especially in the construction sector, such as Louisbourg, Gastier, Constructions Marton or the Ciments Lavallée Cemco.

Over the course of Accurso's career, he has had ties and has made donations to representatives of several provincial political parties in Quebec including the Parti Québécois, the Quebec Liberal Party, and the Action démocratique du Québec.

Accurso was a friend of Louis Laberge, the founder of Fonds de solidarité FTQ which is sponsored by the Fédération des travailleurs du Québec (Quebec Federation of Labour). Accurso's businesses have accumulated $114 million (Canadian) in subsidies from Fonds de solidarité. In December 2004 and January 2005 Accurso was pictured with high ranking union officials Louis Bolduc and Jean Lavallée, and former Montreal city manager Robert Abdallah sailing on his 119-foot yacht.

In 2009, Frank Zampino, former chair of Montreal's executive committee, sailed on Accurso's yacht before Accurso was awarded a $355-million water-metre contract by the city. The contract was later cancelled in May 2009, and Zampino was charged with fraud, conspiracy and breach of trust after a 2 1/2-year investigation.

== Legal issues and incarceration ==
On April 8, 2009, the Canada Revenue Agency (CRA) executed search warrants concerning tax evasion investigations in Accurso's construction companies. In December 2010, two of Accurso's companies, Constructions Louisbourg Ltd. and Simard-Beaudry Construction Inc., pleaded guilty to tax evasion for claiming false expenses, many involving renovations to Accurso's yacht, and paid fines exceeding $4.1 million. Bruno and B.T. Céramique pleaded guilty to tax evasion in February, 2011, and paid more than $1.3 million in fines. This stemmed from invoices for standard business services were handed out without any work being done. The three construction companies then claimed the fake work as business expenses on their tax returns, dodging about $400,000 in taxes.

Following the report Le fonds sous influence on the program Enquête on September 24, 2009, Accurso sued journalist Alain Gravel and Société Radio-Canada for invasion of privacy and defaming his reputation; he sought $2.5 million in damages. In November 2009, Accurso admitted that the facts presented in Gravel's report were true. The admission was made public July 15, 2010.

In October 2009, Accurso gave $100,000 to fund municipal politician Benoît Labonté's bid when Labonté entered the leadership race for Vision Montréal.

Accurso was arrested with 13 others on April 17, 2012, after investigation by the Unité permanente anticorruption on charges relating to an alleged illegal contract-sharing system near the Montreal suburb of Mascouche. Along with four men, Accurso faced six charges of conspiracy, fraud, forgery and breach of trust by a public officer in an attempt to defraud the government of more than $3 million.

In September 2014, at the Charbonneau Commission, Accurso's publication ban was rejected by the commission. Accurso denied any links to the Montreal Mafia, but did admit Montreal mob boss Vito Rizzuto was a "minor contact".

In February 2018, Accurso was acquitted of the breach of trust charge related to the Mascouche case, while the other four charges had already been dropped.

On July 5, 2018, Accurso was sentenced to four years in prison after he was found guilty of five charges: conspiracy to commit acts of corruption, conspiracy to commit fraud, fraud of over $5,000, municipal corruption, and aiding in a breach of trust related corruption of competition for municipal contracts in Laval between 1996 and 2010.

In 2022 and 2023, there were several attacks on Accurso’s home in Deux-Montagnes, as well as those of family members.

In July 2023, the Supreme court of Canada refused his appeal, and in March 2024, Accurso was granted full parole, just months after starting to serve his sentence. One month after his release, he was arrested for breach of his parole conditions.

== Personal life ==
On October 26, 2018, his son James was killed in a traffic accident in the Laurentians.
