= Jane Poitras =

Jane Poitras may refer to:

- Jane Ash Poitras (born 1951), Canadian artist and printmaker
- Jane Cowell-Poitras (born 1953), Canadian politician
