= Dessau (engineering) =

Engineering consulting firm company

- Industry: Engineering-Construction Services
- Founded: 1957
- Headquarters: Montreal, Quebec, Canada
- Key people: Marc Verreault, President & CEO (Interim)
- Revenue: ▲ C$750 million (2012)
- Owner: Stantec Inc.
- Number of employees: 4,800 (as of March 8, 2012)
- Website: dessau.com

Dessau was an engineering consulting firm. It was the fifth-largest engineering-construction firm in Canada and was ranked 57th in the world. The company traced its origins to 1957, when Jean-Claude Desjardins and Paul-Aimé Sauriol founded an engineering consulting firm by the name of Desjardins & Sauriol. Active in both national and international markets, the firm employed 4,800 people and posted annual revenues of $750 million. The company had offices in North America, Central America, South America and the Caribbean. Dessau was one of "Canada’s 50 Best Managed Companies."

== History ==
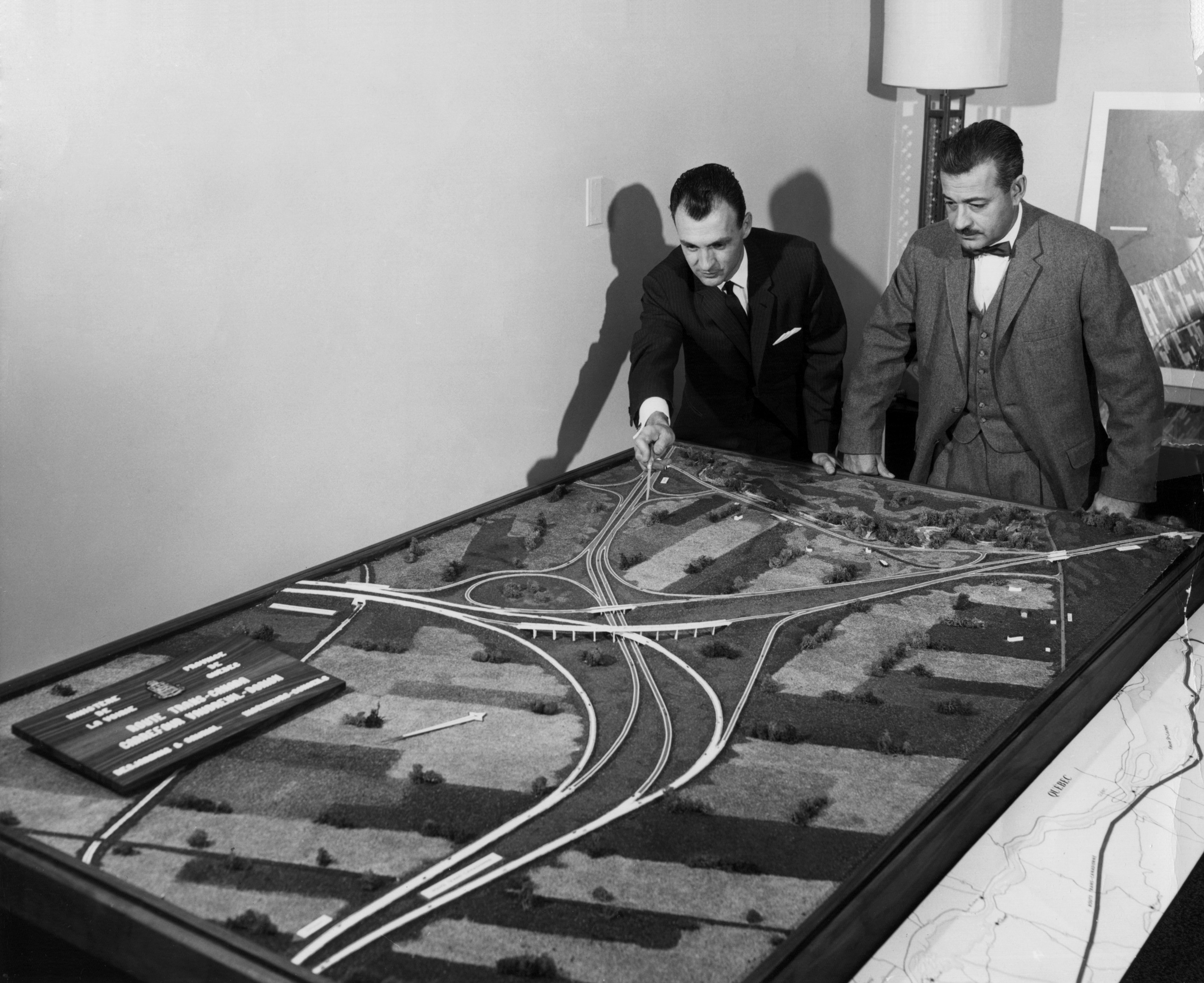
Jean-Claude Desjardins and Paul-Aimé Sauriol, 1964–1966.

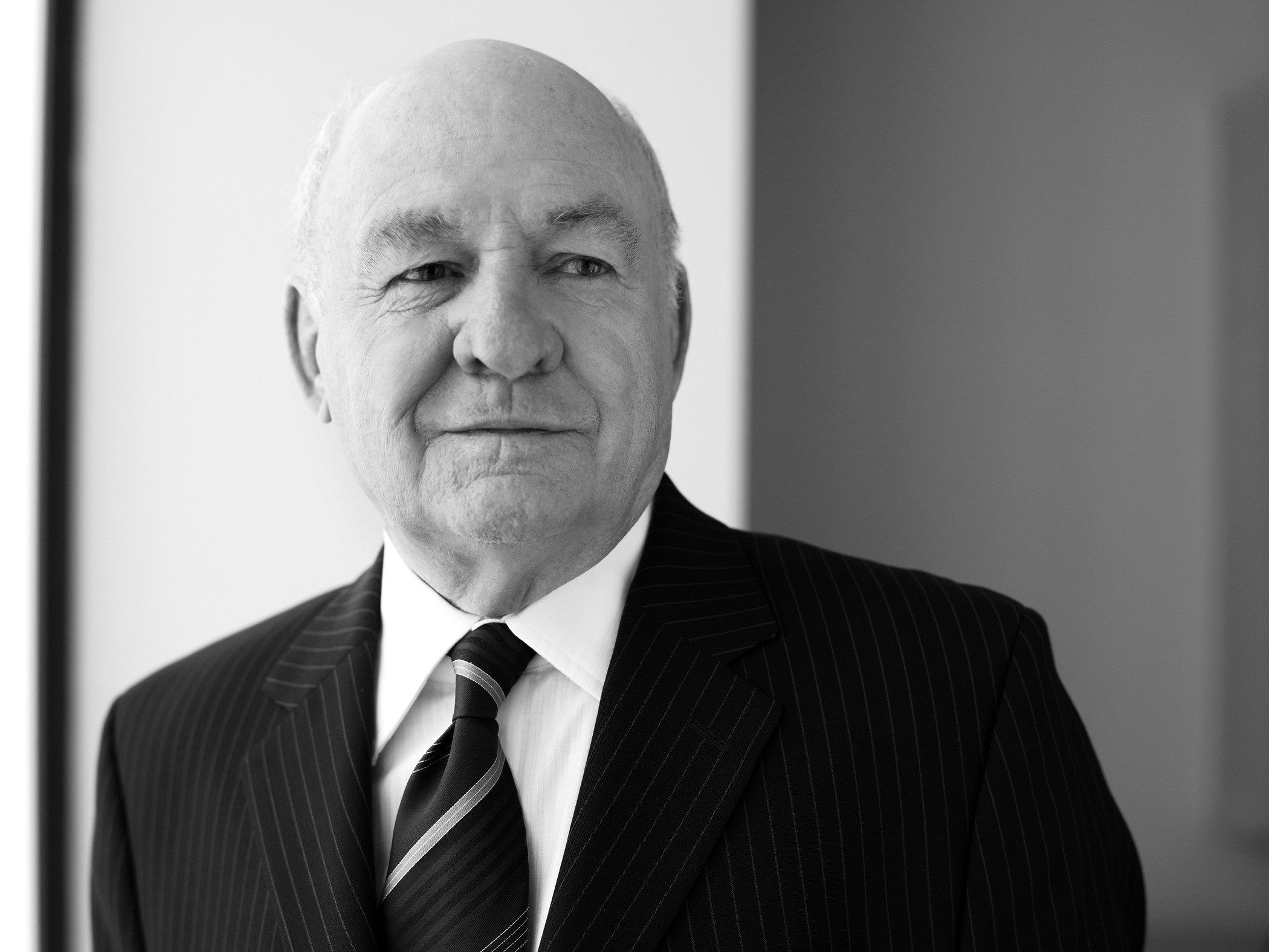
Paul-Aimé Sauriol, Founder

The firm was established as Desjardins & Sauriol, ingénieurs-conseils in late 1957 by provincial highway engineer Jean-Claude Desjardins and Paul-Aimé Sauriol, who ran a small engineering consultancy in Île Jésus, Quebec.

In Quebec, the following years marked the onset of the Quiet Revolution, a period of rapid change for both the province as well as Desjardins & Sauriol, whose business had grown to 30 employees by 1961. As a large number of engineering-construction megaprojects were undertaken in the province, the firm secured numerous transportation and municipal engineering contracts and expanded its business to include geotechnical, structural, electrical and mechanical departments.

The James Bay hydroelectric project, dubbed by then-premier Robert Bourassa as Quebec's "Project of the Century", earned the company national recognition and facilitated its international expansion. The James Bay project, with a generating capacity of 16,000 MW and spanning an area the size of New York State, included one of the largest hydroelectric systems in the world. Headquartered in Matagami, Dessau's team oversaw soil studies, layout verification, logistics and the building of a strategic road through challenging terrain. A multidisciplinary team of engineers, geologists, surveyors, loggers, bush pilots, laborers, truckers and technicians completed the project a year ahead of schedule.

In 1975, Dessau was mandated to build a new national highway in Zaire. Dessau International was set up three years later.

The 1980s brought an expansion of Dessau's international footprint as well as its first steps in the field of environmental sustainability and energy efficiency. Dessau subsequently undertook a series of environmentally relevant projects from restoring waterways in the greater Montreal area to conservation plans informing Quebec's energy strategy.

The 1990s saw a series of strategic mergers and acquisitions.

Dessau continued to take on major international projects, such as the East-West Highway in Algeria, SIEPAC Central American electric grid interconnection project or the Guajimia Canal in the Dominican Republic, while retaining its position in the Quebec engineering market.

In 2013, Rosaire Sauriol, Vice President of Dessau Engineering, left the company within days of his testimony before the Charbonneau Commission. He confessed that Dessau had participated in a system of collusion in Montreal between 2000 and 2010 and that he helped organize $2 million of false billings to help finance political parties.

== Major Projects ==
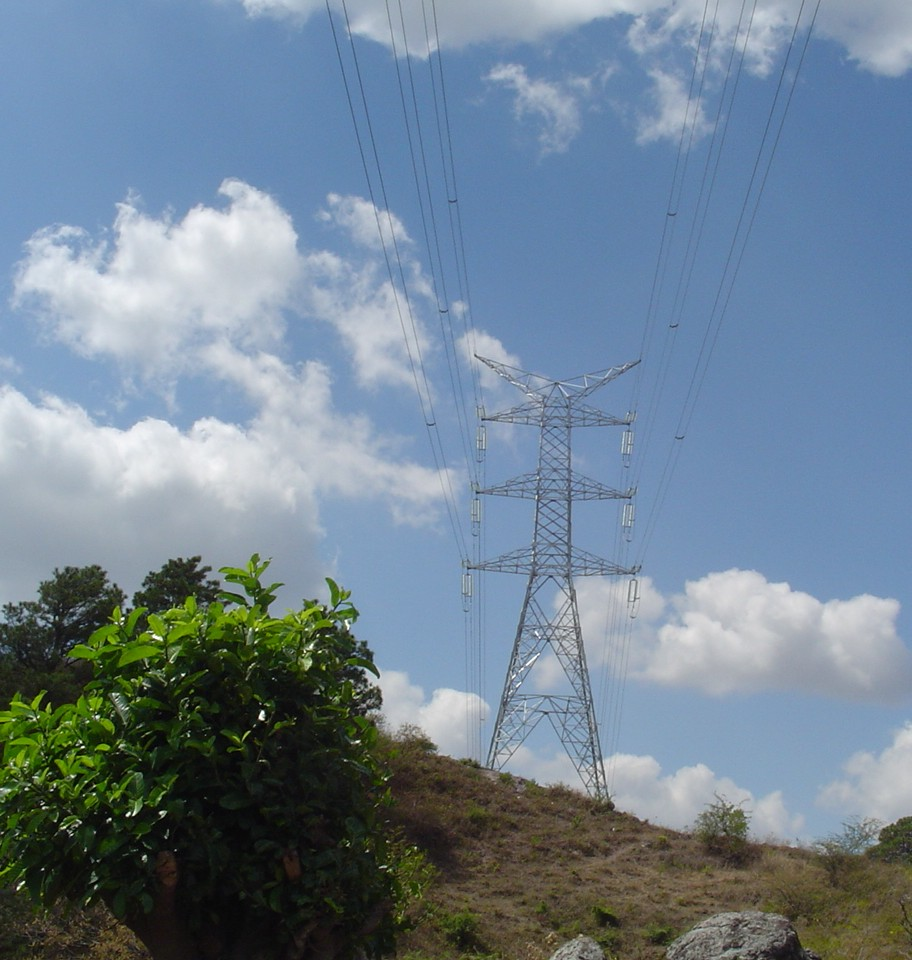
SIEPAC

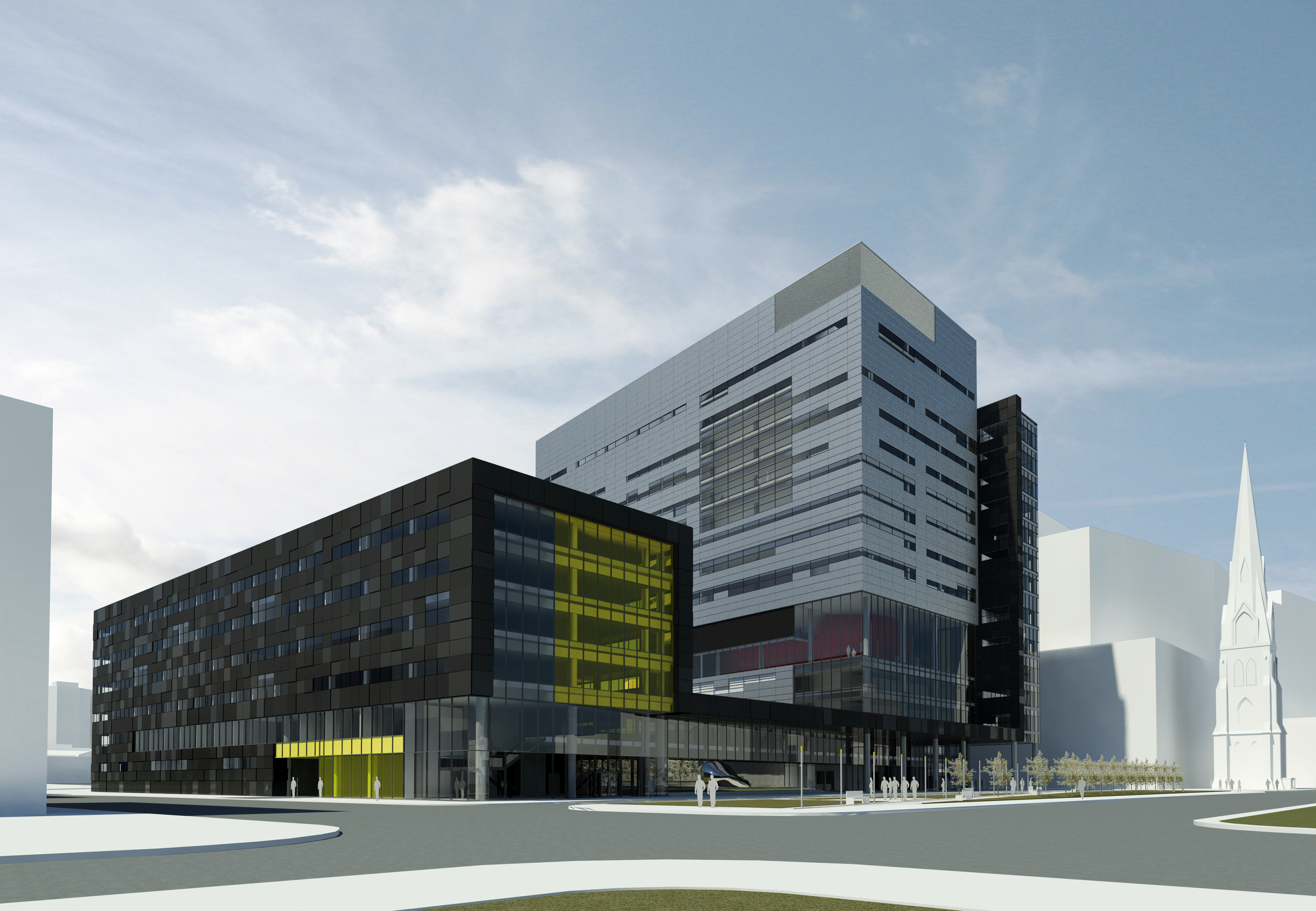
CR-CHUM

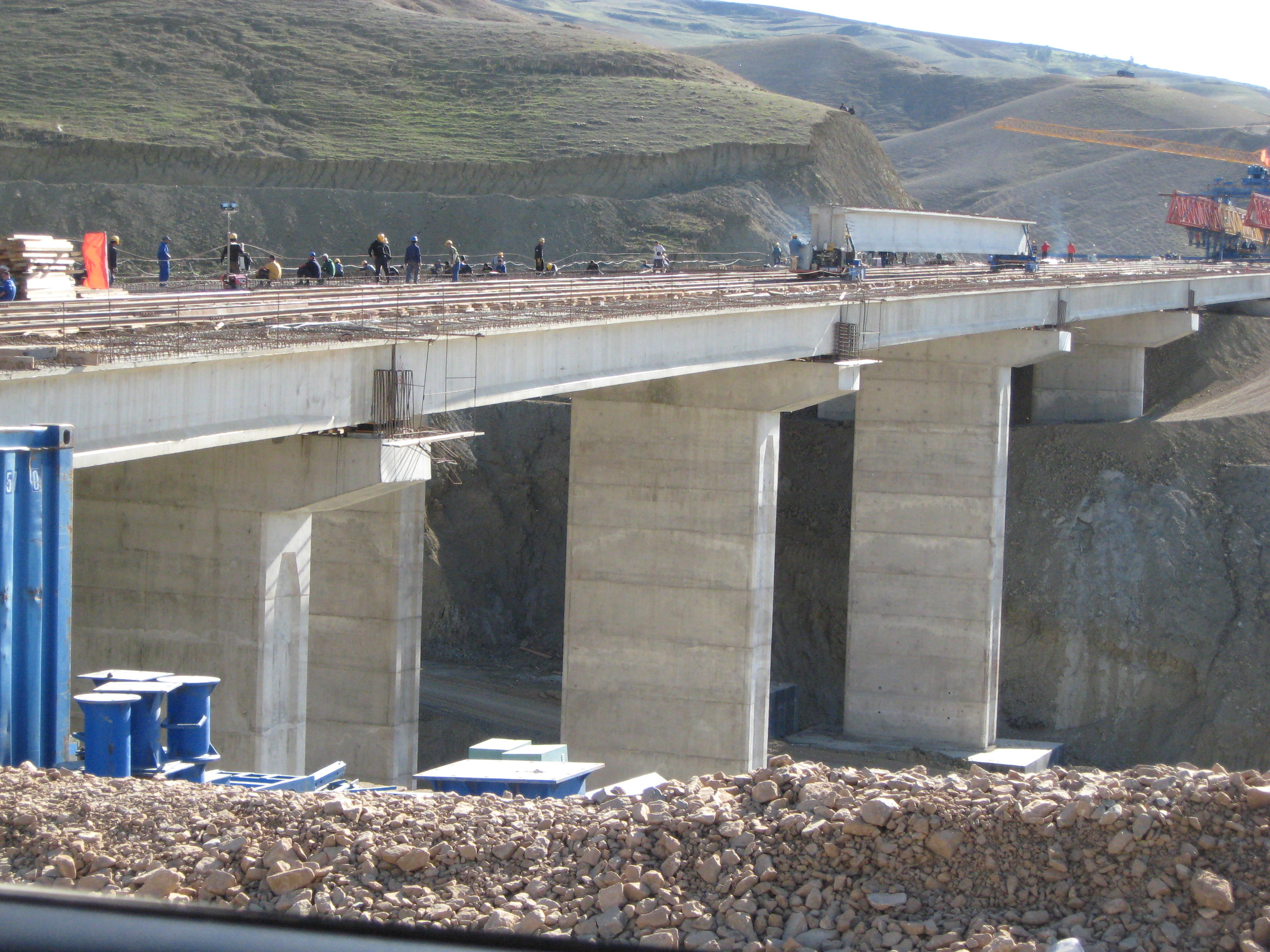
East-West Highway, Algeria

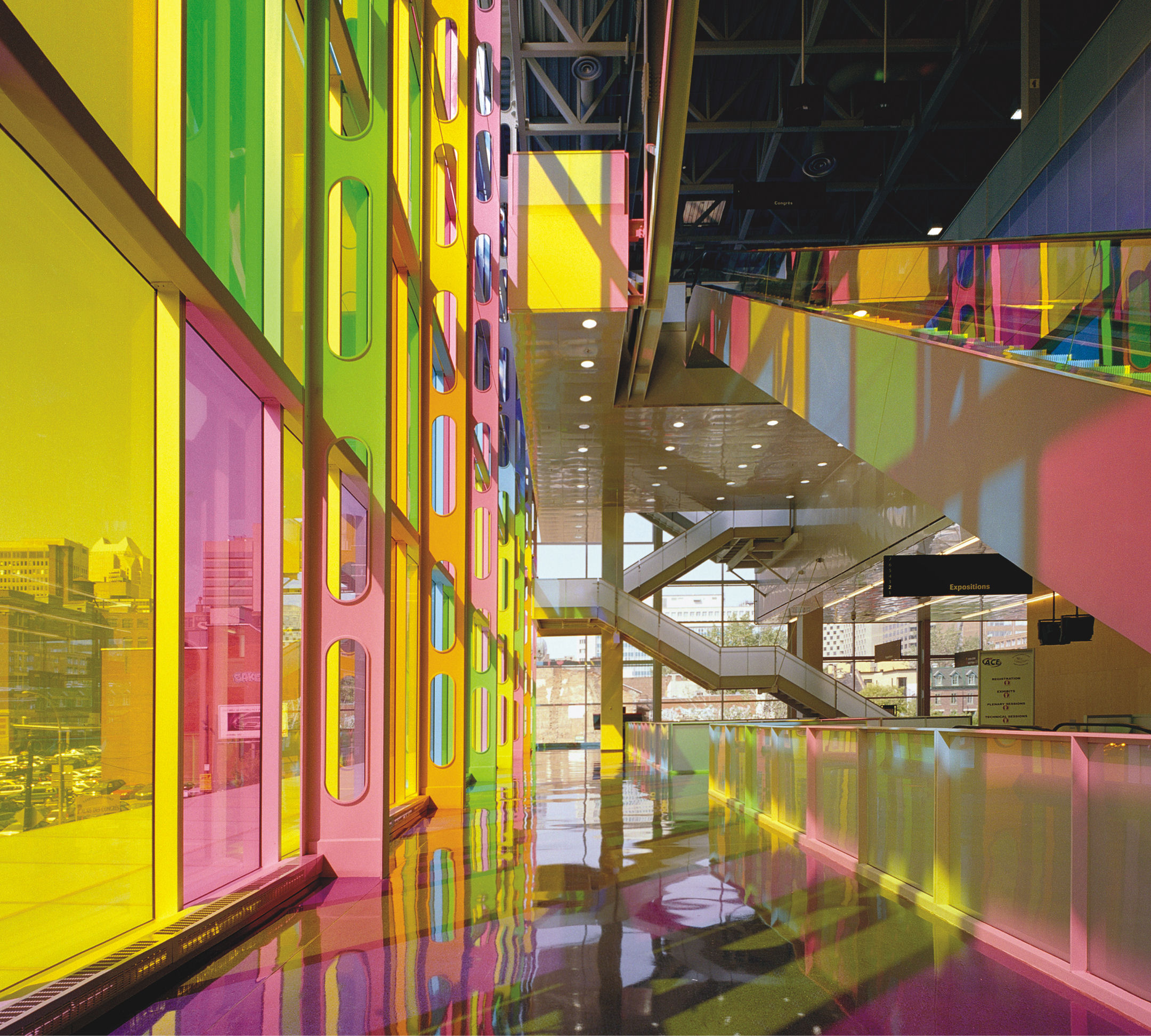
Montreal Palais des Congrès Convention Centre

2012: Bridge design for a structure spanning the Magdalena River – Colombia

2011: Quality control during the construction of a 4.2 km runway at Calgary International Airport – Calgary, Canada

2010: Construction of the Centre hospitalier de l'Université de Montréal – Research Centre (CR-CHUM) – Montreal, Canada

2010: 1,200-km East-West Highway – Algeria

2010: Guajimia Canal sewage treatment – Santo Domingo, Dominican Republic

2010: Montreal metro fixed equipment and systems upgrades – Montreal, Canada

2008: Trinidad rapid rail project – Trinidad and Tobago

2008: SIEPAC Central American Electrical Interconnection System – San José, Costa Rica

2007: Great Mosque of Algiers – Algeria

2006: Redevelopment of the LeBreton Flats – Ottawa, Canada

2005: Construction and expansion of Campanario thermoelectric power plant – Chile

2004: Acadie Circle reconstruction – Montreal, Canada

2002: Palais des congrès de Montréal Convention Centre – Montreal, Canada

2000: Rural electrification project supervision – Peru

1990: Canadian Museum of Civilization – Gatineau, Canada

1975: James Bay hydroelectric project – Quebec, Canada

== Offices ==
Dessau operates nearly 80 offices in Canada, Algeria, the Caribbean and Latin America (Chile, Colombia, Costa Rica, Peru, Dominican Republic, Trinidad and Tobago).

== Areas of Expertise ==
Services	Markets/Sectors
1.Engineering	1.Buildings
2.Urban Planning and Landscape Architecture	2.Water
3.Geotechnical, Materials and Environmental	3.Energy
4.Management and Construction	4.Environment and Sustainable Development
5.Operations	5.Health and Education
	6.Industry
	7.Telecommunications and Security
	8.Transportation
	9.Municipalities

== Subsidiaries ==
Name	Fields
LVM	Geotechnical, Materials and Environmental Engineering
Verreault	Management and Construction
Plania	Urban Planning and Landscape Architecture
Simo	Facilities Management – Water and Wastewater Treatment Plants
Société Gestrans	Public and Adapted Transportation
Sogep	Recreational Facility Management

== Projects ==
=== Projects from 1957 to 1969 ===
Projects	Year
1.Master plan for roads, sewers and water mains, Saint-Martin Parish, Île Jésus, Laval, Canada	1957
2.Road, sewer, water supply and drainage plans for the cities of Fabreville, Pont-Viau, Sainte-Dorothée and Chomedey, Canada	1957-1968
3.Section of the Trans-Canada Highway (A-20), Saint-Hyacinthe, Canada	1961
4.Chomedey water treatment plant, Île Jésus, Laval, Canada	1961
5.Extension of the Laurentian Highway (A-15), Saint-Jérôme, Canada	1961-1962
6.Materials testing for highways 10, 40 and 15, Montréal, Canada	1961-1964
7.Materials testing, geotechnical services, dams, dykes and water intake for the Outardes hydroelectric project, James Bay, Canada	1961-1970
8.Antoine-Labelle School, Sainte-Rose, Canada	1962
9.Various highway sections in Quebec (A-20, A-40, A-540, A-520 and A-10), Canada	1962-1966
10.Ville-Marie Expressway, Fullum-Saint-Léonard section, Montreal, Canada	1963
11.Reconstruction of Pie-IX Bridge, Île Jésus, Montreal, Canada	1963-1965
12.Turcot Interchange (A-20), Montreal, Canada	1963-1965
13.Sainte-Thérèse water treatment plant, Canada	1964-1965
14.Vaudreuil-Dorion Interchange, Montreal, Canada	1964-1966
15.Road network study, Île Jésus, Canada	1964-1967
16.Sûreté du Québec building, Montreal, Canada	1965-1968
17.Saint-Eustache arena, Canada	1965
18.Champlain Bridge resurfacing, Ottawa, Canada	1969-1970
19.James Bay access road study, Quebec, Canada	1969-1970
20.Soil analysis and materials testing for numerous Hydro-Québec hydroelectric projects (Manic-Outardes, La Grande, Caniapiscau reservoir, Romaine and Grande-Baleine rivers, etc.), Canada	1961-1980

=== Projects from 1970 to 1979 ===
Projects	Year
1.Elimination of level crossings, various railroads, Dorion, Canada	1969-1972
2.Science building, Université du Québec à Montréal, Canada	1970-1971
3.Sections of highways 19, 13 and 440, Laval, Canada	1970-1977
4.James Bay access road, including 720 kilometres of highway and 11 major bridges, Quebec, Canada	1971-1976
5.Materials testing, Olympic complex and stadium, Montreal, Canada	1971-1980
6.Matagami Airport, James Bay, Quebec, Canada	1972-1974
7.Mechanical and electrical systems, Collège Montmorency, Laval, Canada	1973-1975
8.Mechanical and electrical systems, Cité de la Santé Hospital, Laval, Canada	1973-1977
9.Zaire National Highway, 750 kilometres of highway and 16 bridges, Democratic Republic of Congo, Africa	1973-1979
10.Twinning of Lachapelle Bridge connecting Laval and Montreal, Canada	1973-1976
11.Dykes and dams, Caniapiscau reservoir, Quebec, Canada	1974-1983
12.Materials testing, Manic 3 power station, Quebec, Canada	1975
13.Materials testing, LG2 power station, Quebec, Canada	1975
14.Head office, Dessau I building, Laval, Canada	1975-1977
15.Power transmission lines for the James Bay project, 7000 km, 6 lines, Quebec, Canada	1975-1980
16.Dorion bypass, Highway 20, Quebec, Canada	1977-1981
17.Highway117, 13 km, Grand-Remous, Canada	1977
18.Quality control, Marine Industries turbine upgrades	1977
19.Access road for the Grande-Baleine hydroelectric complex, 300 km of road and 11 bridges, Quebec, Canada	1979-1981
20.Design and construction of the Tennis 13 recreational centre, Laval, Canada	1979

=== Projects from 1980 to 1989 ===
Projects	Year
1.Resurfacing of Highway 40 West, Montreal, Canada	1980
2.Redesign of Saint-Martin Boulevard West, Laval, Canada	1981
3.Rural electrification of 400 villages, Côte d'Ivoire, Africa	1981-1986
4.Dessau II building, Laval, Canada	1981-1982
5.Fabreville water treatment plant, Laval, Canada	1982-1986
6.Upgrades to 78 Hydro-Québec sub-stations, Quebec, Canada	1982-1990
7.Geotechnical engineering and materials testing, LG2 power station and Caniapiscau dam, James Bay, Canada	1983-1987
8.Saint-Gabriel de Brandon arena, Canada	1983-1984
9.Marigot intercepting sewer, 15 kilometres underground, Laval, Canada	1984-1985
10.Utility upgrades, Place Montréal Trust, Centre Eaton and Promenades de la Cathédrale, Montreal, Canada	1984-1989
11.Electrical and telecom systems, Canadian Museum of Civilization, Gatineau, Canada	1984-1990
12.Design of Place Saint-Roch, Quebec City, Canada	1984-1985
13.Expansion and repair of Viau Bridge, Laval-Montreal, Canada	1985-1988
14.Radisson-Nicolet-Des-Cantons power transmission line (6th line), 450 kV, James Bay, Quebec, Canada	1985-1989
15.Five railway bridges – Douala Yaounde Line, Cameroon	1984-1985
16.Materials testing, Bell Canada buildings, Montreal, Canada	1986
17.Mechanical-electrical systems, Hydro-Québec administrative centre, Laval, Canada	1986-1989
18.Resurfacing of Beauharnois Suspension Bridge, Canada	1986-1989
19.Widening of a section of the Décarie Expressway, Montreal, Canada	1989-1990
20.Lake Robertson power station, Côte-Nord, Canada	1984-1995

=== Projects from 1990 to 1999 ===
Projects	Year
1.Reconstruction of the Beauharnois power station, Canada	Depuis 1990
2.Reconstruction of the El-Azab power station, Egypt	1990
3.Road repair, Nord-Kivu, Democratic Republic of Congo	1990-1996
4.Public transportation plan for the Société de transport de Laval, Canada	1990-1991
5.Integrated waste management, Cotonou, Benin	1991-2000
6.Expansion of the Chomedey water treatment plant, Laval, Canada	1991
7.Grain storage program, Bangladesh	1993
8.Structural assessment of 200 bridges, Malaysia	1993-1995
9.East Lake wastewater treatment, Hubei, China	1993-1995
10.Cosmodôme de Laval structure, Canada	1993-1994
11.500 kV power transmission, Ertan, China	1993-1999
12.Environmental survey of contaminated sites, Quebec, Canada	1994-1995
13.Redevelopment of Henri-Bourassa Boulevard (between Albert-Hudon and Marien streets), Montreal, Canada	1995-1998
14.Repairs to Highway 1, Vietnam	1995-1996
15.Construction of the Rabat-Fès Highway, Morocco	1995-1996
16.Power transmission line rehabilitation, Peru	1996
17.National energy-efficient buildings program, China	1996-2000
18.Water purification program, Dominica	1987-2004
19.Revitalization of the Sine and Ferlo fossil valleys, Senegal	1997
20.Reconstruction of Hydro-Québec's energy transmission grid following the 1998 ice storm, Quebec, Canada	1998-2000
21.Expansion of Montreal's Palais des congrès, Canada	1999-2002
22.Highway 2000 project, Jamaica	1999-2002

=== Projects from 2000 to 2009 ===
Projects	Year
1.Rolls-Royce Trent Atwater test cell, Montreal, Canada	2000-2002
2.Repair and replacement of station equipment in the Montreal metro, Canada	2000-2011
3.Bridge rehabilitation program, Grenada	2001
4.LeBreton Flats development plan, Ottawa, Canada	2001-2006
5.Hydro-electric mini-stations, Dominican Republic	2001-2007
6.National Circus School, Montreal, Canada	2002-2003
7.Inspection and CAD for 25 major bridges, Algeria	2002-2003
8.Acadie Circle redesign, Montreal, Canada	2002-2003
9.Water purification system rehabilitation, Venezuela	2002-2006
10.Preliminary and final designs, second Algiers beltway, Algeria	2003-2005
11.Underwater fibre-optic telecommunications cable, Gaspé Peninsula-Magdalen Islands, Canada	2003-2004
12.Asset management for the City of Longueuil, Canada	2003-2006
13.Honoré-Mercier Hospital renovation and expansion, Quebec, Canada	2003-2005
14.Decontamination and rehabilitation of Fort-Georges Island	2003-2006
15.Water quality improvement works in the Guajimia Canal, Dominican Republic	2003-2008
16.Quartier DIX-30 shopping centre, Brossard, Canada	2004-2006
17.Repair and widening of Highway 175, Quebec, Canada	2003-2008
18.Outremont Community Centre, including telecommunications systems, Montreal, Canada	2004-2006
19.Electro-mechanical systems at the Toulnustouc power station, Quebec, Canada	2001-2005
20.Preliminary design for the Princes Town-Mayaro Highway, Trinidad and Tobago	2005-2006
21.Project management assistance for the East-West Highway, Algeria	2006-2010
22.SIEPAC Electrical interconnection project, Central America	2006-2009
23.Project management assistance for the Great Mosque of Algiers, Algeria	2007-2013

=== Projects from 2010 to 2015 ===
Projects	Year
1.Design and construction studies for an electrified double railway track, Algeria	2010-
2.Construction of the Université de Montréal Hospital Centre Research Centre (CR-CHUM), Canada	2010-
3.Construction du McGill University Hospital Centre (MUHC), Montreal, Canada	2010-
4.Quality control during the construction of a 4.2 km runway at Calgary International Airport, Canada	2011-
5.Design of a new bridge spanning the Magdalena River, Colombia	2012-

== Stantec ==
On 24 September 2014, Stantec announced that they would acquire the engineering assets of Dessau. The acquisition was completed in January 2015.
