= Paul-Aimé Sauriol =

Canadian engineer and businessman (1931–2010)

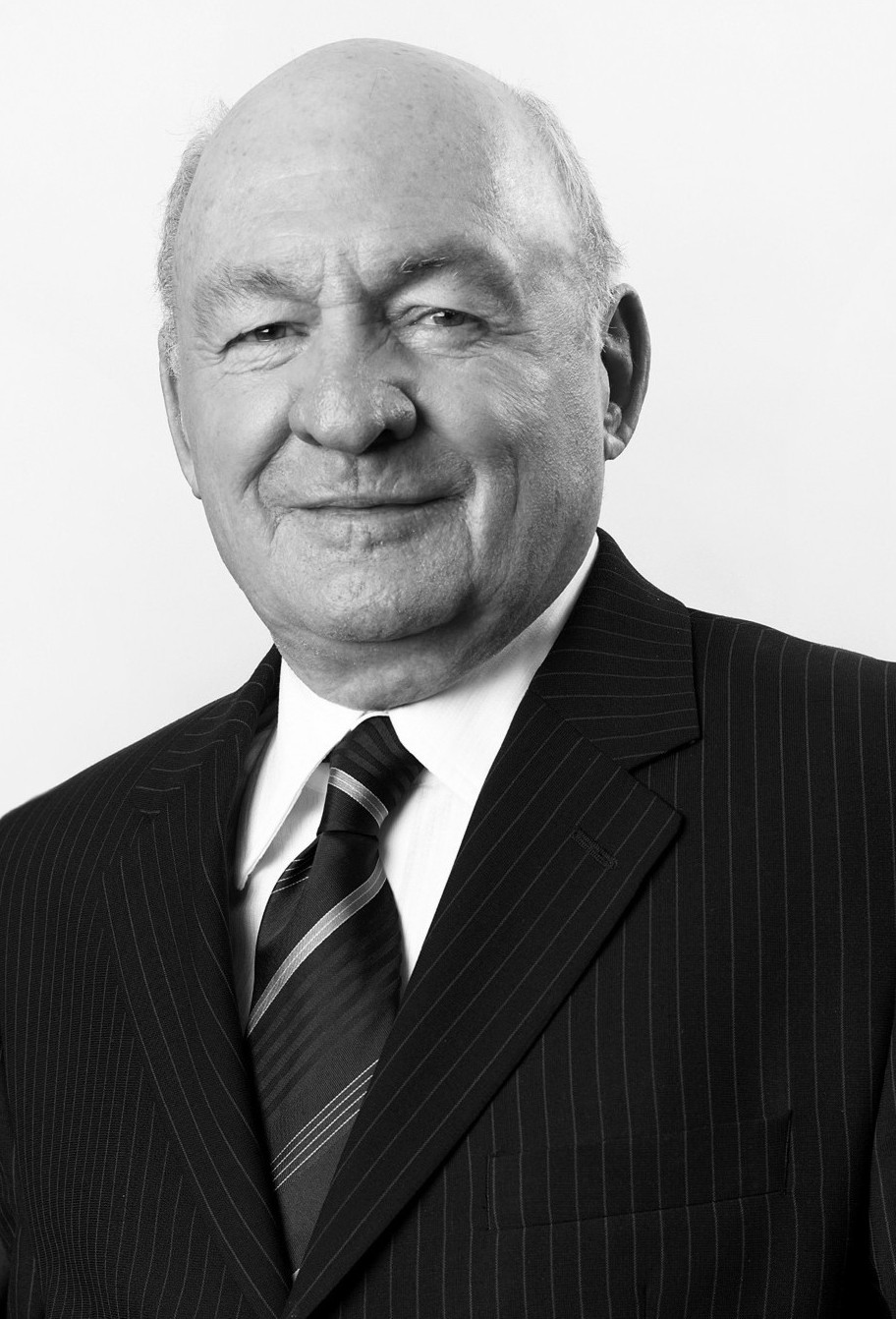
- Born: 3 September 1931; Laval, Quebec, Canada
- Died: 22 September 2010 (aged 79); Laval, Quebec
- Education: École Polytechnique de Montréal
- Occupations: engineer and business executive

Paul-Aimé Sauriol (3 September 1931 – September 22, 2010) was a Canadian engineer and business executive.

== Life and career ==
Sauriol was born in Laval, Quebec, Canada, the son of a farmer. He graduated with a degree in civil engineering from the École Polytechnique de Montréal in 1955. Two years later, he founded the engineering firm Desjardins + Sauriol, which is now known as Dessau, alongside business partner Jean-Claude Desjardins. Today, what once began as a two-man engineering consultancy employs 4,800 people and is one of the largest engineering-construction companies in Canada.

Sauriol was the recipient of several notable awards, including the 1997 Josef-Hode-Keyser Award for his contributions to Quebec's transportation sector, and the 1998 Dunamis Award for his contributions to the City of Laval's economic development. In 2004, Sauriol received the Jean-Jacques Archambault Award, the most prestigious award in Quebec's electrical industry.

Following a long battle with cancer, he died in Laval on September 22, 2010, at age 79.
