= Flag of Montreal =

Montreal
- Proportion: 1:2
- Adopted: 13 September 2017; 9 years ago
- Design: Symmetric cross

First displayed in May 1935, Montreal based its flag on the city's coat of arms. It was revised in May 1939 and again in September 2017. The flag's proportions are 1:2 in a symmetric cross.

== Symbolism ==
The flag consists of a red symmetric cross with a red disc in the centre, as well as five emblems representing the ancestral presence of Indigenous peoples and the four main European ethnic groups that were settled in the city in the 19th century, and which are also represented on the Canadian Red Ensign.

Image	Symbol	Description
	Heraldic cross	A red heraldic cross, representing the "Christian motives and principles which governed the founders of the city," according to the city's official web site. (The original coat of arms on which the flag is modelled had a red saltire instead of a symmetric cross until 1938.)
	White pine	A white pine, representing the continual presence of Indigenous peoples, specifically using a central Haudenosaunee (Iroquois) symbol, the Tree of Peace.
	Fleur-de-lis	A blue fleur-de-lis, of the Royal House of Bourbon, representing the French. (The original coat of arms on which the flag is modelled had a beaver in place of the fleur-de-lis until 1936.)
	Rose of Lancaster	A red Rose of Lancaster, representing the English.
	Shamrock	A shamrock, representing the Irish.
	Thistle	A thistle, representing the Scottish.

== Previous flags ==
Flag of Montreal from 1935 to 1939

Flag of Montreal from 1939 to 2017

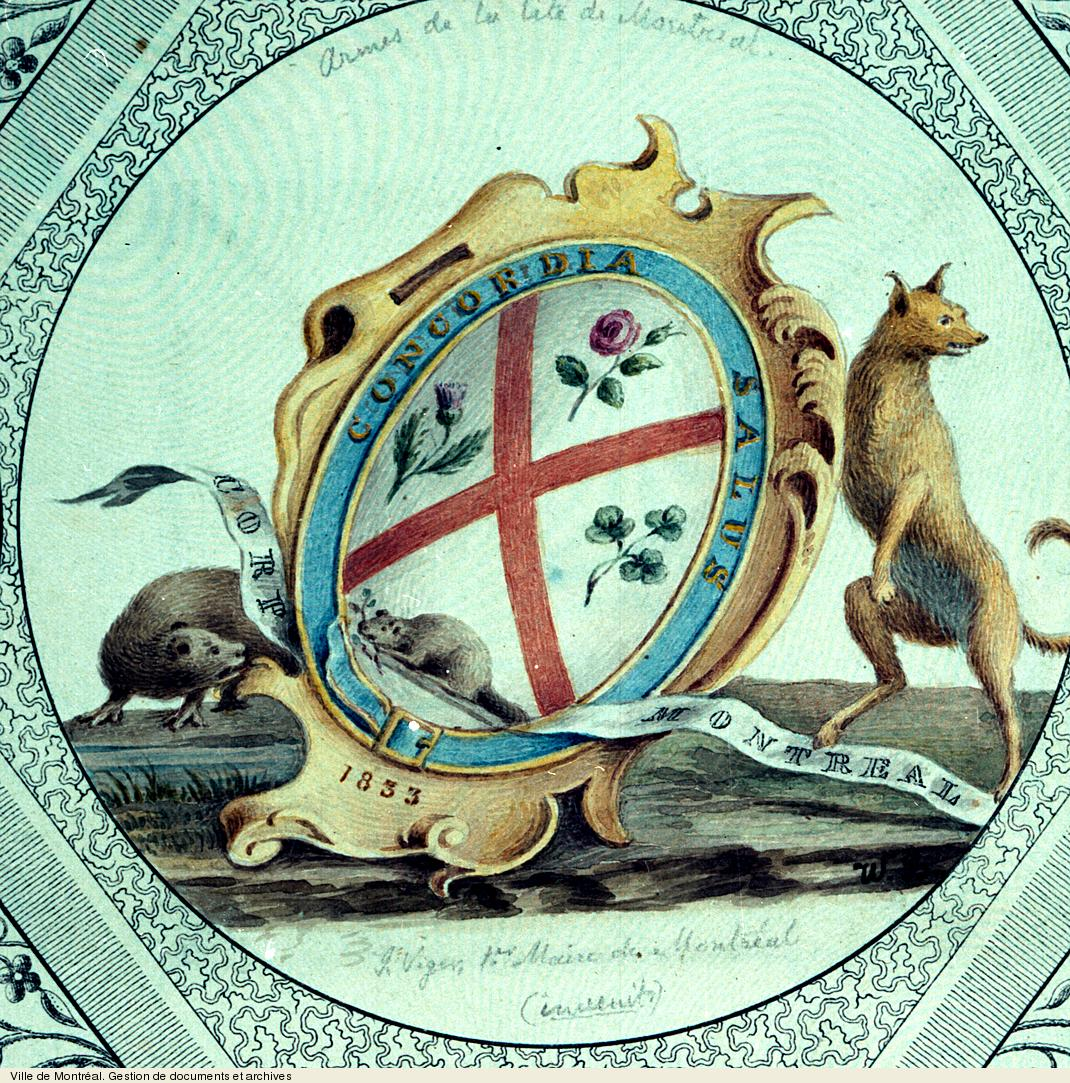
Original 1833 Coat of arms of Montreal

Montreal's flag is based on its coat of arms. The original coat of arms was designed in 1833 by the first mayor of Montreal, Jacques Viger. It was similar to the current version with the difference that the red cross was a saltire, a beaver stood in the place of what is now a fleur-de-lys, and there was no white pine. The arms were revised on 21 March 1938.

Four years prior to the first raising of the revised flag, King George V, the sovereign of Canada, celebrated his Silver Jubilee (25th year on the throne) on Monday May 6, 1935. An article in the Montreal Gazette from May 3, 1935, reported that the city's Jubilee committee had discovered a rule whereby official coats of arms of British corporations could be interpreted into flag banners. Per the article, Montreal prepared to raise its own distinct flag for the first time ever on the King's Jubilee day based on the original coat of arms by Jacques Viger.

In May 1939, the flag was revised to display a symmetric cross instead of a saltire, as well as a blue fleur-de-lys instead of a beaver.

== Current flag ==
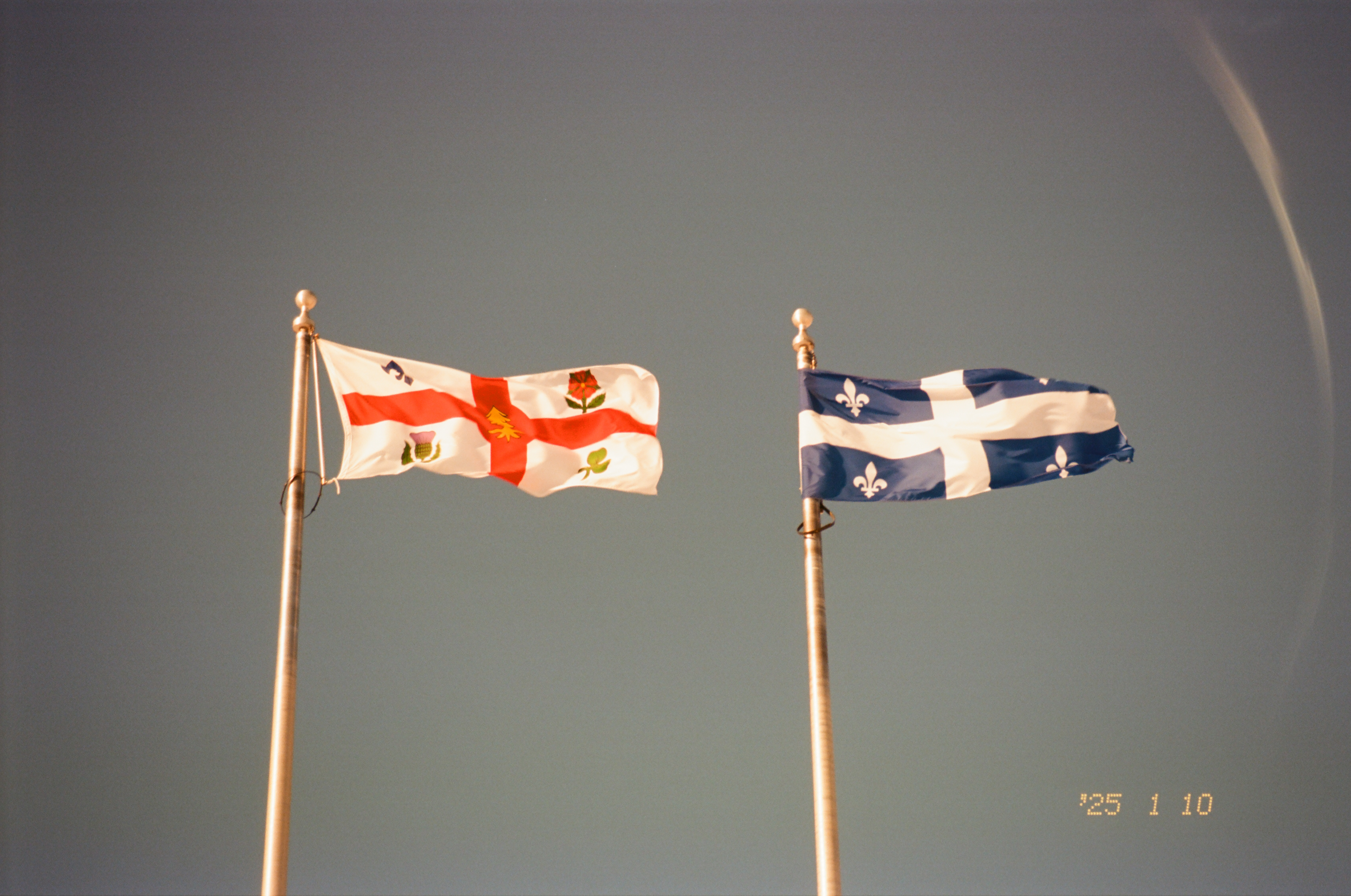
Current flag of Montreal next to the Flag of Quebec, 2025

On February 12, 2017, Montreal Mayor Denis Coderre announced a modification to the flag of Montreal to include a First Nations symbol. The decision was made in 2017 during the city's 375th anniversary of the founding of the city. The symbol was chosen by the First Nations communities of Montreal, those being Haudenosaunee and Algonquin although there are large Inuit, Métis and Anishinaabeg populations. The new flag was unveiled on September 13, 2017.

== See also ==
- Arms of Canada: Another use of English-French-Scottish-Irish motif in Canadian symbolism
- Coat of arms of Montreal
