= Gérald Tremblay =

Canadian politician (born 1942)

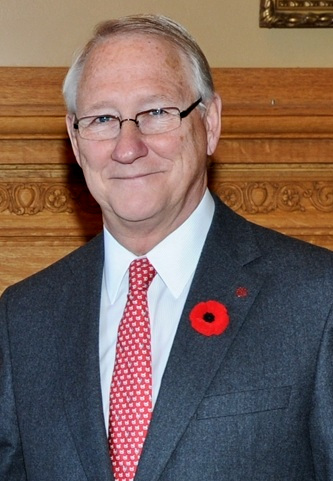
- Tremblay in 2011

41st Mayor of Montreal
- In office January 1, 2002 – November 5, 2012
- Preceded by: Pierre Bourque
- Succeeded by: Jane Cowell-Poitras (Acting); Michael Applebaum

Minister of Industry, Commerce, Science and Technology
- In office October 11, 1989 – September 26, 1994
- Premier: Robert Bourassa; Daniel Johnson, Jr.
- Preceded by: Pierre MacDonald
- Succeeded by: Daniel Paillé

Member of the National Assembly of Quebec for Outremont
- In office September 25, 1989 – April 15, 1996
- Preceded by: Pierre Fortier
- Succeeded by: Pierre-Étienne Laporte

Personal details
- Born: September 20, 1942 (age 84) Ottawa, Ontario, Canada
- Party: Union Montréal (defunct); Quebec Liberal Party (provincial)
- Spouse: Suzanne Tailleur
- Relations: Marcel Tremblay (brother)
- Children: Marie-Laurence, Georges-Étienne
- Education: University of Ottawa; Harvard Business
- Profession: Entrepreneur Businessman

Gérald Tremblay (born September 20, 1942) is a former Canadian politician and businessman who served as mayor of Montreal from 2002 until his resignation in 2012. He also served as president of the Montreal Metropolitan Community. Before becoming mayor he had a long career in business and management. Tremblay resigned as Mayor on November 5, 2012, following allegations of corruption made at the Charbonneau Commission.

== Early life and career ==
Born in Ottawa, Ontario, Tremblay grew up in Montreal, where his family moved when he was four years old. His parents, Georges Albert Tremblay, a notary, and Rollande Forest, had four boys: Michel, Gérald, Marcel, and François. He obtained a Bachelor of Laws from the University of Ottawa in 1969, and was admitted to the Bar of Quebec in 1970. He earned a Master of Business Administration (MBA) from Harvard Business School in 1972.

He was a professor and lecturer at HEC Montréal from 1974 to 1977.

He then served as a senior manager in several companies. He worked at a consulting firm from 1977 to 1981, the Fédération des caisses d'entraide économique du Québec from 1981 to 1982, as well as various businesses in the hospitality and retail industry from 1982 to 1986 and the Société de développement industriel from 1986 to 1989. He was also a member of the board of directors of the Caisse de dépôt et placement du Québec and Hydro-Québec, as well as the governor of the Quebec MBA Association.

He was elected as the Liberal MNA for Outremont in 1989. He first sat in the National Assembly and served as Minister of Industry, Commerce, Science and Technology in the Bourassa Cabinet from October 11, 1989, to January 11, 1994, and in the Johnson Jr. Cabinet from January 11 to September 26, 1994.

He was re-elected to the National Assembly in September 1994, and was named president of the Commission de l'économie et du travail from December 1, 1994, until his resignation on April 15, 1996.

After his second term in the legislature and up until his election as mayor on November 4, 2001, Tremblay returned to the private sector. He taught again at HEC Montréal, worked at Monitor Company and Rolland, and sat on the board of directors of various companies. He was also a successful entrepreneur, setting up a chain of specialty boutiques called Dans un Jardin which sold mostly perfume, but also jam, and other small delicacies. He also served as president of World Skills 1999, held in Montreal.

Gérald Tremblay and his wife, Suzanne Tailleur, were married on November 24, 1979, and four years later adopted twins, Marie-Laurence and Georges-Etienne.

== Mayoral career ==
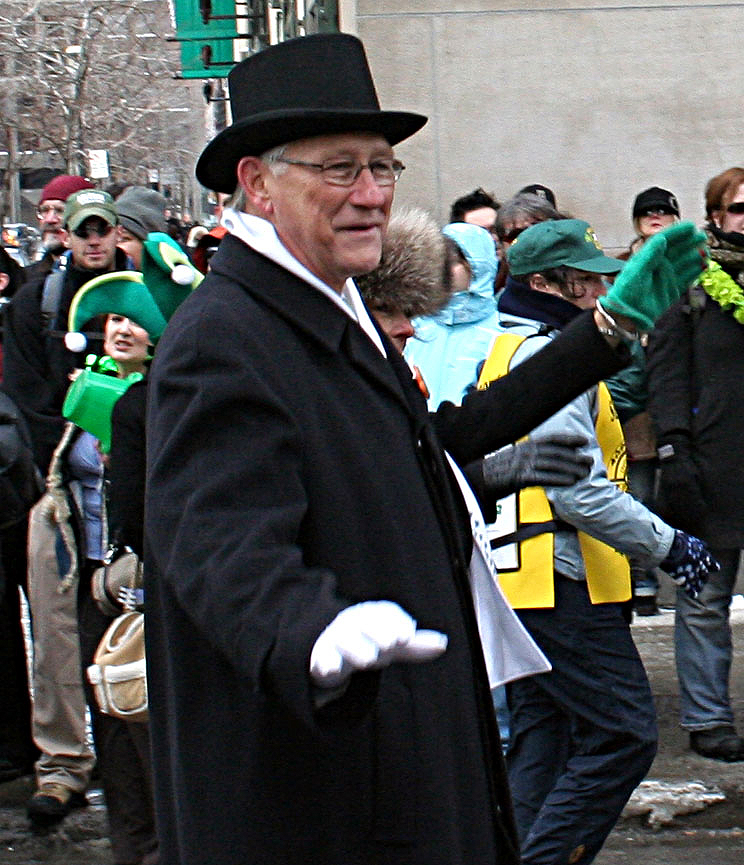
Mayor Tremblay at the 2007 Montreal Saint Patrick's Day Parade.

Tremblay ran for mayor of Montreal after the controversial merging of the 29 municipalities that made up the Montreal Urban Community (MUC) into one single city spanning the entire island of Montreal, which caused then-mayor Pierre Bourque, who was associated with orchestrating the merger, to call an election. Tremblay's municipal political party was known as the Montreal Island Citizens Union (now known as Union Montréal), and his election campaign was based on re-evaluating the merger and decentralizing the city structure. In the 2001 election, shortly after the towns on the island of Montreal had been forcibly merged into a new Island-wide city of Montreal, Tremblay campaigned as the defender of towns and cities. He received a great deal of support from opponents of the amalgamation. He was elected mayor on November 4, 2001, with the support of a diverse coalition, formed mostly of opponents of the merger.

However, in the subsequent referendum on the question of demerger, he was accused of betraying his supporters by coming out strongly in favour of the "no" side, supporting the megacity.

On November 6, 2005, Gérald Tremblay won his second term in office, easily winning against long-time rival Pierre Bourque by 74,646 votes. The voter turn-out estimated at 39.13% was the lowest ever in the history of the Montreal municipal elections. (See 2005 Quebec municipal elections).

While in office, Tremblay streamlined the city's operations, but also generated controversy in some quarters. While his administration improved public consultation mechanisms, it is also considered by many to be one of the most secretive administrations in Montreal history, causing some to declare that the democratic deficit has grown during his tenure despite improvements to consultation.

In 2006, Tremblay was appointed vice president for North America of United Cities and Local Governments and re-elected vice president of the International Association of Francophone Mayors.

Gérald Tremblay was re-elected for a third term on November 1, 2009, with 37.90% of the vote. He defeated Louise Harel (32.73%) of Vision Montreal and Richard Bergeron (25.45%) of Projet Montréal. The 2009 campaign focused on ethics and governance in the wake of the scandal of water meters and collusion in the awarding of contracts in infrastructure.

=== Criticism ===
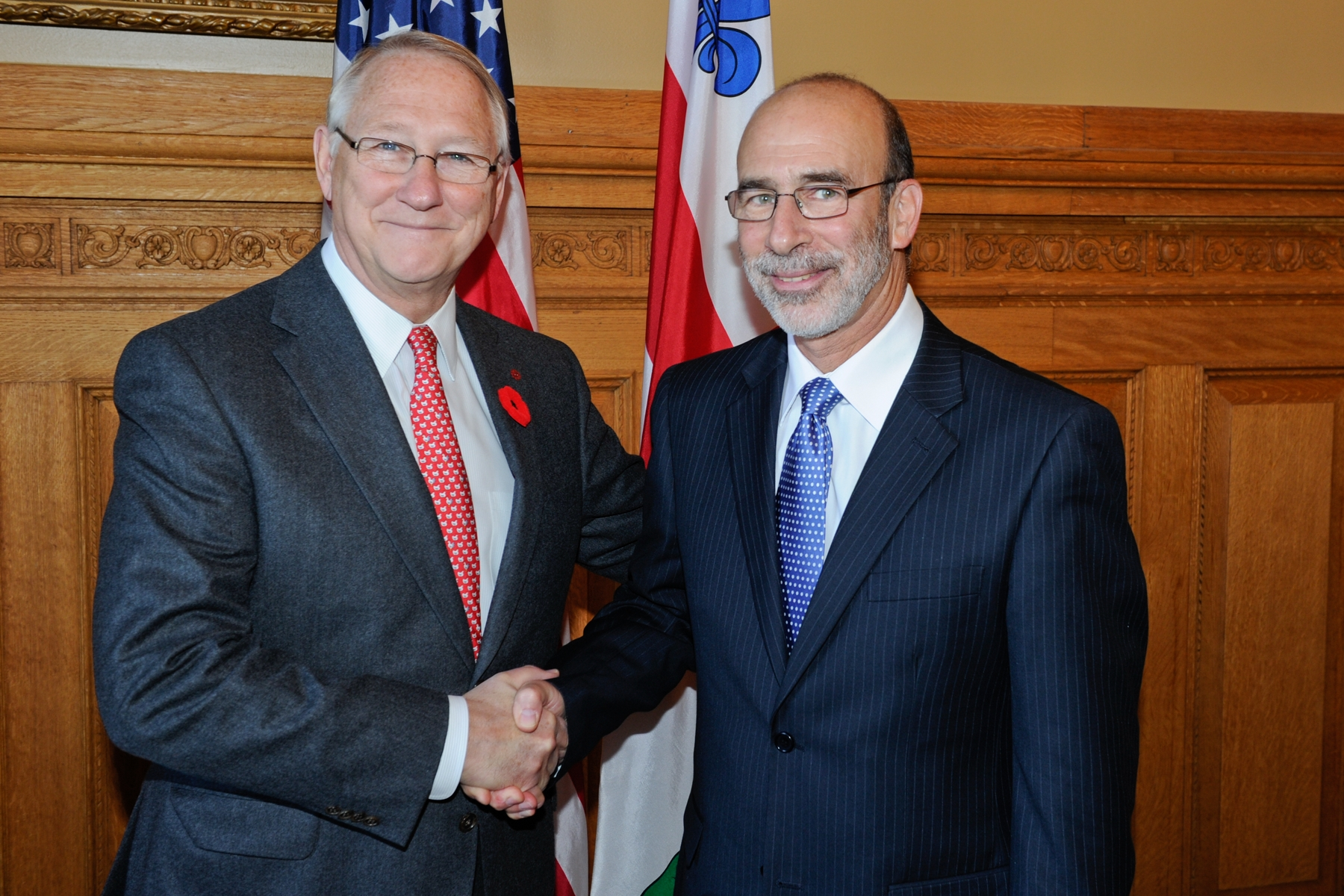
Gérald Tremblay shakes hands with the United States Consul General.

His administration decentralized the city by giving more power to the boroughs. He has been criticized by suburban mayors who decry his clear preference for Montreal to receive a much larger share of the island's tax revenues than it would have had the merger not taken place. However, many argue that these boroughs are even less responsive to the public than City Hall, since they are not required to offer public consultations on their decisions. Nevertheless, the public can (and sometimes does) force referendums on particular bylaw proposals.

Tremblay received criticism for his proposal to change the name of Avenue du Parc to Avenue Robert-Bourassa, in honour of former Quebec premier Robert Bourassa, without public consultation. The proposal was approved by City Council in a vote on November 29, 2006. Much of the criticism of the proposal came from residents and businesses who inhabit Avenue du Parc. On February 6, 2007, Mayor Tremblay backed away from his position on Avenue du Parc after losing the support of Bourassa's family. In a press conference on the issue, the mayor claimed to "have learned that the opinion of citizens is important."

=== Resignation ===
During a hearing at the Charbonneau Commission on October 1, 2012, construction industry contractor Lino Zambito alleged that Tremblay's party, Union Montreal received a sum equivalent to 3% of the value of sewerage rehabilitation contracts awarded by the City of Montreal to a mafia-linked cartel.

On October 30, 2012, a former Union Montreal party organizer alleged that Mayor Tremblay was involved in illegal financing with the mafia. He claimed that Tremblay knew of these dubious financial practices and did not want to be made aware of them. These statements caused a series of negative reactions from the spokes people of all the provincial political parties.

Following the allegations, Tremblay announced that he would be taking a few days off. On November 5, 2012, Tremblay announced that he was resigning as mayor, and was leaving politics.
