= Jane Cowell-Poitras =

Canadian politician (born 1953)

Mayor of Montreal Acting
- In office November 5, 2012 – November 16, 2012
- Preceded by: Gérald Tremblay
- Succeeded by: Michael Applebaum
- In office June 18, 2013 – June 25, 2013
- Preceded by: Michael Applebaum
- Succeeded by: Laurent Blanchard

Montreal City Councilor for Lachine
- In office 2001–2013
- Preceded by: position created
- Succeeded by: Jean-François Cloutier

Lachine City Councilor
- In office 1988–2001
- Succeeded by: position abolished

Personal details
- Born: 1953 (age 72–73) London, England
- Party: Independent
- Other political affiliations: Union Montreal (2001–2013)

Jane Cowell-Poitras (born 1953) is a Canadian politician. She was an elected member of Montreal City Council from 2001 until 2013 and had served as councillor of Lachine from 1988 until its amalgamation with Montreal in 2001. Her portfolio included social and community development, family policy, status of women, housing, urban Indigenous people and senior citizens. She worked closely on both the City of Montreal's Family Policy and Senior Citizens' Policy (MADA).

As deputy mayor, she served as acting mayor of the city from November 5 to November 16, 2012, following the resignation of Gérald Tremblay, and again from June 18 to June 25, 2013, following the resignation of Michael Applebaum.

== Background ==
Born in London, England, and Montreal resident since the age of two, Cowell-Poitras studied business at Concordia University. Prior to becoming a city councillor, Cowell-Poitras was president of NATA, a business that coordinated conferences and volunteering workshops in the community.

== Acting mayor ==
Following the resignation of Gérald Tremblay on November 5, 2012, Cowell-Poitras assumed the office of acting mayor of Montreal, by virtue of holding the office of deputy mayor, a position which rotates among different councillors throughout a council term, at the time of Tremblay's resignation. She was the first woman in the city's history to assume the office of mayor, having been preceded only by the ceremonial appointment of Lise Payette as honorary mayor of the city for one day in 1976 to mark the International Women's Year.

She served until November 16, when council selected Michael Applebaum as the city's new interim mayor. She again became acting mayor on June 18, 2013, when Applebaum resigned, serving until the selection of Laurent Blanchard on June 25. She was a candidate for interim mayor in the council vote, but garnered just three votes to 30 for Blanchard and 28 for councillor Harout Chitilian. Cowell-Poitras chose not to run in the 2013 elections, following 25 years of public service.

== Post Political Life ==
Following her retirement from politics, Cowell-Poitras returned to school to complete a DEC in Library and Information Technologies at John Abbott College. Upon graduation in 2015, she was hired by the Merging Waters Pastoral Charge of the United Church of Canada where she worked until November 2019.

Her retirement from politics also allowed her the time to get involved in more volunteer opportunities. From 2014 to 2018 she assumed the presidency of The Teapot – Lachine's Seniors’ Centre. She joined the Montreal-Lakeshore University Women's Club in 2014, where she currently holds the position of Archivist. Cowell-Poitras is also the Regional Director for Quebec (English-speaking Clubs) for the Canadian Federation of University Women. In 2018, she was named Resolutions Convenor for the National Council of Women Canada and she volunteers every Friday morning at Villa Beaurepaire Senior's Residence in Beaconsfield.
