= Simard-Beaudry Construction =

Canadian constriction company

- Industry: Construction
- Founded: 1950
- Headquarters: Laval, Quebec, Canada
- Key people: Tony Accurso
- Website: simard-beaudry.com

Simard-Beaudry Construction is a major construction company in the Canadian province of Quebec.

Based in Laval, Quebec, the company is specialized in large scale engineering projects.

== Overview ==
Simard-Beaudry was founded in 1950 and builds bridges and roads, dams, as well as urban infrastructures and water purification.

The company is headed by businessman Tony Accurso who is also active in the sustainable energy sector: in September 2010, Simard-Beaudry Construction launched Prestige Energis, a subsidiary dedicated to renewables.

In December 2010, Simard-Beaudry Construction Inc., pleaded guilty to tax evasion for claiming false expenses, many involving renovations to Accurso's 119-foot yacht, and paid fines exceeding $4.1 million. This stemmed from invoices for standard business services were handed out without any work being done. The company was involved in claiming fake work as business expenses on their tax returns, dodging about $400,000 in taxes.

== See also ==
- PCL Construction
