= Unité permanente anticorruption =

Quebec, Canada law enforcement agency

Permanent Anti-corruption Unit Unité permanente anticorruption
- Logo of UPAC
- Abbreviation: UPAC
- Motto: Prévenir Vérifier Enquêter; Prevent Check Investigate

Agency overview
- Formed: 16 February 2011
- Employees: 200 (2014)
- Annual budget: CA$30,000,000

Jurisdictional structure
- Operations jurisdiction: Canada
- Legal jurisdiction: Quebec
- Constituting instrument: Anti-Corruption Act
- Specialist jurisdiction: Anti-corruption

Operational structure
- Headquarters: Montreal
- Agency executive: Robert Lafrenière, Commissioner

Website
- www.upac.gouv.qc.ca

The Unité permanente anticorruption (French pronunciation: [ynite pɛʁmanɑ̃t ɑ̃tikɔʁypsjɔ̃], UPAC; English: Permanent Anticorruption Unit) is a Quebec government agency whose aim is to fight corruption, collusion and other economic crimes involving government procurement.

== Background ==
UPAC was established by the government of Quebec on February 16, 2011, to coordinate the efforts of six teams: Opération Marteau, the contractual verification team of the Ministry of Municipal Affairs, the anti-fraud squad of Revenu Québec, the anti-collusion unit of Transports Québec, Régie du Bâtiment investigators as well as Commission de la construction du Québec inspectors. The UPAC team of over 350 people has an operating budget is $30 million. It reports to the Ministry of Public Security.

== Mandate ==
The mandate of the UPAC is particularly focused on the construction industry. The Unit investigates offenses associated with corruption, collusion and fraud, including collusion and fraud in the awarding and execution of public contracts. They share expertise and intelligence across departments and agencies.

== Past investigations ==
=== Operation Lauréat ===
According to a Global News report, Operation Lauréat was an investigation into the biggest corruption fraud in Canadian history, implicating SNC-Lavalin in bribery for the construction of the McGill University Health Centre. The lawyer for the MUHC, whose testimony was part of the Charbonneau inquiry into corruption in Quebec's construction industry, testified that while the contract to build the hospital complex was worth $1.3 billion, it actually totalled close to $4.6 billion when costs of managing the public-private partnership were factored in, representing an inflation of up to 20% or $934 million.

== Other investigations ==
In late 2016, the UPAC began investigating two Montreal School Boards, the English Montreal School Board and the Lester B. Pearson School Board, over allegations of irregularities. "Project Pandore", as the investigation was called, focused on allegations of fraud, forged documents and abuse of power at the international department of Lester B. Pearson and resulted in three arrests.

== See also ==
- Commission Charbonneau
- Corruption in Canada
