= Coat of arms of Montreal =

Municipal symbol in Quebec, Canada

Versions
- Former coat of arms (1938–2017)
- Armiger: City of Montreal
- Adopted: 21 March 1938; 13 September 2017
- Crest: A beaver couchant on a log proper
- Shield: Argent on a cross nowy Gules a white pine tree eradicated Or between in the first quarter a fleur-de-lis Azure, in the second quarter a rose, in the third quarter a thistle and in the fourth quarter a shamrock proper
- Motto: Concordia Salus (Latin for "salvation through harmony")

The first coat of arms of Montreal was designed by Jacques Viger, the first mayor of Montreal, and adopted in 1833 by the city councillors. Modifications were made some one hundred five years later and adopted on 21 March 1938, and again on 13 September 2017, resulting in the version currently in use. The coat of arms was the only city emblem representing Montreal until 1981, when a stylized logo was developed for common daily use, reserving the coat of arms for ceremonial occasions.

== History ==
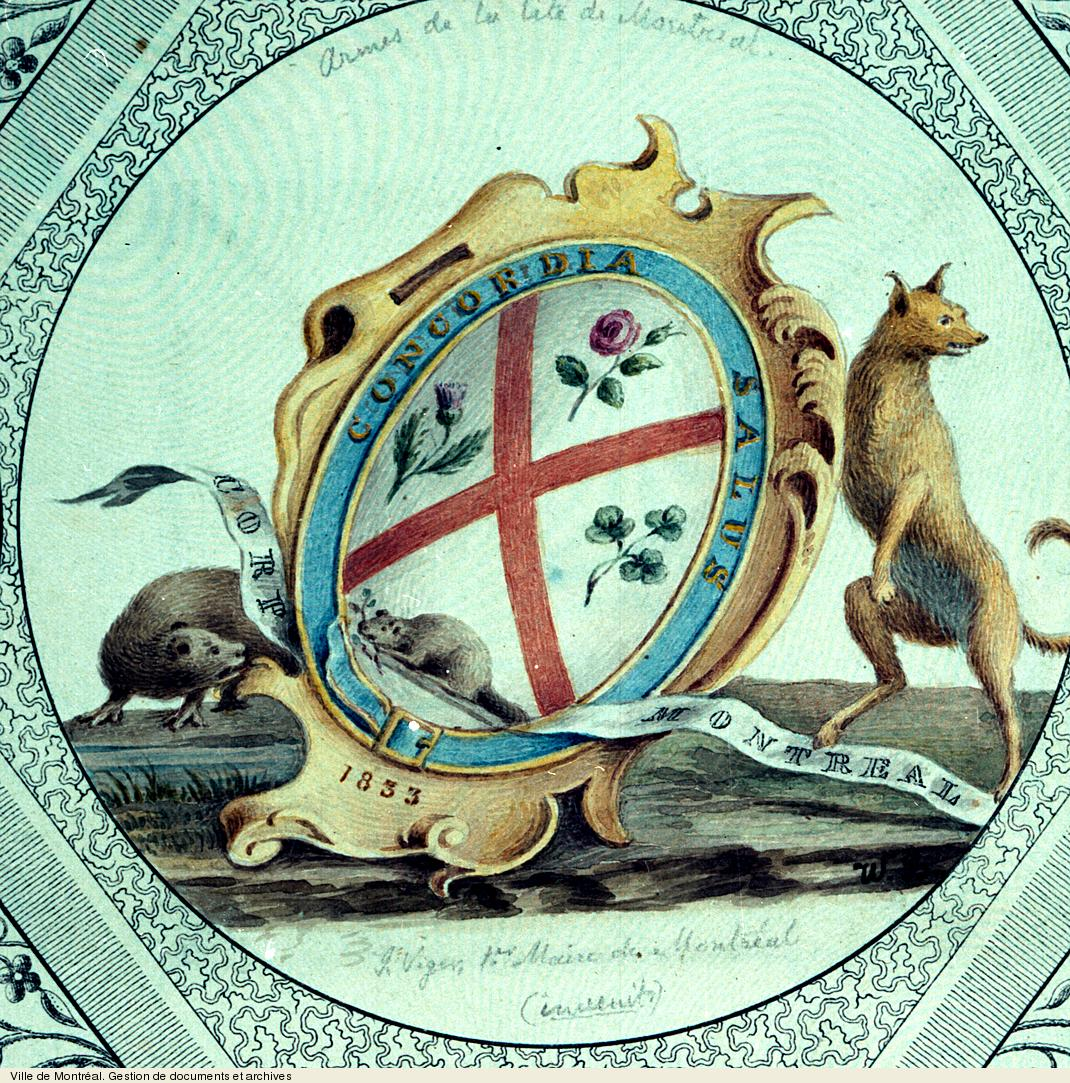
First coat of arms (1833)

The first coat of arms was displayed on a white shield, which had a red saltire with four different charges between the arms, representative of the four main components of the population as viewed by Mayor Jacques Viger and the city council in 1833, when the arms were designed and adopted. To the top, a rose was for the English heritage of the population, the dexter a thistle for the Scots, the sinister a sprig of clover for the Irish heritage of the city, and to the bottom base a beaver for the French who originally settled the territory and traded in furs.

The blazon of the shield in the first coat of arms was as follows: Argent, a saltire gules between in chief a rose of the last leaved and slipped, in base a beaver to the dexter with a branch, and in fess a thistle leaved and slipped and a sprig of shamrock proper. The motto on the scroll below the shield is Concordia Salus, a Latin phrase translated as "salvation through harmony" or in French as "le salut par la concorde".

In 1938, the city council requested that the arms be updated to better reflect Montreal's population. The changes replaced the saltire with a cross, which is reminiscent of both the St. George's Cross often associated with England, and also with Christian missionary missions that could represent the principles of the French Catholics that founded the city. The beaver had become a general symbol of Montreal and its industriousness by this time period, and no longer merely represented the original French settlers, thus it was moved to ensign the shield. In place of the beaver on the shield, a blue fleur de lys was added to symbolize the descendants of the original French settlers. The rose, thistle and clover remained. The shield was surrounded by a wreath of sugar maple leaves to symbolize the amicable relations between the various elements of Montreal's population and an allusion to the maple as a national emblem of Canada. The Latin motto was retained.

In 2017, the city council decided to add a symbol representing the Indigenous Peoples, a white pine in a circle on the middle of the cross.

== Blazon of the arms ==
The Canadian Heraldic Authority granted the current version of the coat of arms in September 2017. The blazon of the arms is as follows:

Argent on a cross nowy Gules a white pine tree eradicated Or between in the first quarter a fleur-de-lis Azure, in the second quarter a rose, in the third quarter a thistle and in the fourth quarter a shamrock all proper; and for the crest, a beaver couchant on a log proper; the same surrounded by a spray of maple leaves Vert, with the motto CONCORDIA SALUS.

=== National symbols ===
The five flora designs found upon the shield are traditional national symbols in their own right, with each one alluding to a specific historical device used by a state or nation.

A fleur de lys.	The Red Rose of Lancaster.	A trefoil or shamrock.	A thistle.	A white pine.

The Fleur-de-lis has long used by the French royal houses, such as the House of Bourbon, in their coat of arms and was found upon the national flag of the French during the time Montreal was founded, and was also used as a mark of honour or favour by the King of France. The first European settlers in possession of the Island of Montreal hailed from France, and thus are represented by this symbol.

The Red Rose of Lancaster was used as a symbol of the English Royal House of Lancaster, and has become a symbol of the English people as well.

Traditionally known as a trefoil, the shamrock was a symbol to early Irish Christians of the trinity. It has endured to become a symbol of the Irish people.

Found in various folklore of the Scots since Roman times, the thistle has also been long used in the compartment of the Scottish royal coat of arms, and has been symbolic of the Scottish people long before heraldry.

The white pine symbolizes the Indigenous Peoples and stands for Peace and Harmony. It also represents the Circle of Life and the council fire – a place for meeting and dialogue for the First Nations.

== Logo ==
In 1981, with an attempt to modernize the city's use of such emblems, Montreal introduced a logo for common municipal use, while the coat of arms would be reserved for the most formal of ceremonies and events. The device consists of the city's name with accent mark as found with the French spelling and a stylized rosette that is itself composed of four hearts. Officially, the type is to be in black and the rosette in red, but a few variations exist for printing purposes when the set colours would not contrast well on documents.

2008 proposed logo for Greater Montreal, quickly abandoned

Greater Montreal attempted to unify the City of Montreal with the other eighty-one surrounding municipalities under one logo in 2006. The logo that was introduced consisted of a stylized 'M' meant to look, as the design firm put it, "deliberately chubby, very welcoming, like a comfy chair." However, the logo received much negative criticism for its "patchwork of hot pink, tangerine, rhubarb, turquoise and green apple", that was viewed as childish in implement and likened to clown paint, Smarties, jelly beans, garbage and even vomit. Public sentiment grew increasingly negative when it was discovered the cost of the ill-received design was $1,487,000 paid out from the public fund. Montreal itself continues to use the 1981 logo, and even Greater Montreal has since dropped the design they themselves introduced.

== See also ==
- Canadian heraldry
- List of Canadian provincial and territorial symbols
- National symbols of Canada
