= Charbonneau Commission =

Public Inquiry in Quebec

The Commission of Inquiry on the Awarding and Management of Public Contracts in the Construction Industry (French: Commission d'enquête sur l'octroi et la gestion des contrats publics dans l'industrie de la construction, also known as the Charbonneau Commission) was a public inquiry in Quebec, Canada into potential corruption in the management of public construction contracts.

The commission was enacted on 19 October 2011 by the provincial Liberal government of Jean Charest, and was chaired by Justice France Charbonneau. The mandate of the Committee was to:

1. Examine the existence of schemes and, where appropriate, to paint a portrait of activities involving collusion and corruption in the provision and management of public contracts in the construction industry (including private organizations, government enterprises and municipalities) and to include any links with the financing of political parties.
2. Paint a picture of possible organized crime infiltration in the construction industry.
3. Examine possible solutions and make recommendations establishing measures to identify, reduce and prevent collusion and corruption in awarding and managing public contracts in the construction industry.

The commission completed its work on 25 November 2015. It led to the resignation of Montreal mayor Gérald Tremblay, as well as the arrests and respective convictions and guilty pleas of interim Montreal mayor Michael Applebaum and Laval mayor Gilles Vaillancourt.

== Testimony ==
At the Charbonneau inquiry, an "ex-construction boss said that for years, three per cent of the value of all contracts he received from the city of Montreal went to the mayor's party, and another one per cent, known as "la taxe à Surprenant," went to a city official."

In 2009 the president of the construction division at SNC-Lavalin (SNC), was told that his firm's proposal to build McGill University's new super-hospital was faulty. However, someone on the McGill University Health Centre (MUHC) had illegally given him a copy of the OHL consortium architectural drawings, which were favoured by the clinicians. Charles Chebl, who at the time was working under Ben Aissa and has since replaced him as head of construction for SNC, testified in May 2014 that Riadh Ben Aissa told him to incorporate the OHL design into a hasty revision of SNC's plan. Chebl apparently demurred, and then was called to a meeting by then-CEO Pierre Duhaime where he claims to have been instructed to plagiarise the OHL design. Ben Aissa and Duhaime allegedly arranged payments of $22.5-million to MUHC CEO Arthur Porter and his right-hand-man Yanai Elbaz in exchange for ensuring SNC won the $1.3-billion contract. The contract was awarded to SNC in July 2010 and by the end of 2011, Porter had resigned all of his positions of public trust, and in February 2013 the police issued a warrant for his arrest. Porter has since absconded justice for "fraud, conspiracy to commit government fraud, abuse of trust, secret commissions and laundering the proceeds of a crime" related to the construction of the super-hospital, but he is fighting extradition from a Panama jail cell.

In September 2012, American FBI agent Joseph Pistone, known for his undercover work with the Bonanno crime family, testified at the Charbonneau Commission as an expert witness regarding Mafia infiltration of U.S. labor unions in the construction industry.

Witnesses detailed a system of bid-rigging that saw a cartel of engineering and construction firms obtain public contracts from the city of Montreal in exchange for political donations. Collusion in the construction industry extended across the river to the city of Longueuil, testified Yves Cadotte, who was in 2014 senior vice-president and general manager of SNC's transport, infrastructure and buildings division. The trick was for the politicians to solicit envelopes and briefcases of cash that were not directly related to the contracts for which tenders were requested, in order by that artifice to be able to skirt anti-bribery laws. Cadotte said the other engineering companies that were part of Longueuil's system at the time were Genivar Inc., Dessau, Groupe SM and Cima+. In one instance the politicians requested $200,000, and Cadotte delivered $125,000 in cash to Liberal party fundraiser Bernard Trépanier, who stashed it in a briefcase. For the remaining $75,000, he said SNC agreed at the party's request to pay an invoice from a Montreal communications firm for services that were largely never rendered. Cadotte was asked whether he ever thought about denouncing the collusion to the Competition Bureau of Canada, which has a policy of clemency for whistleblowers. Cadotte answered "No."

Julie Boulet, the Quebec Minister of Transport during the Liberal government of Jean Charest, contradicted herself when she denied her previous day's testimony that she was well aware of the requirement that cabinet ministers needed to raise funds annually in the amount $100,000. That is, in order to obtain and maintain a cabinet-level job in Quebec one must be able to provide or shepherd $100,000 in campaign contributions.

== Unité permanente anti-corruption (UPAC) ==
By July 2018, Quebec's Unité permanente anti-corruption (UPAC)—anti-corruption police force—which was established in 2011, had 114 convictions. UPAC prosecutors had laid "criminal charges against 331 people and companies". The UPAC undertook investigations stemming from testimonies from the Charbonneau Commission. Convictions from these investigations included those related to "operation Lauréat", former-Mayors Gilles Vaillancourt, Gérald Tremblay, and Michael Applebaum.

According to a November 28, 2018 Global News report, UPAC Officer Jean-Frédérick Gagnon, told the inquiry in 2014 that "operation Lauréat" was an investigation into "the biggest corruption fraud in Canadian history" implicating SNC-Lavalin in bribery for the construction of the MUHC.

In October 2012 police searched two residences owned by then-mayor of Laval, Gilles Vaillancourt, as well as municipal buildings, and safety deposit boxes rented by Vaillancourt. On November 9, 2012, Vaillancourt resigned as mayor and denied all of the corruption allegations against him.

Montreal mayor Gérald Tremblay resigned on November 5, 2012 as a direct result of revelations made in the Commission.

As a result of the testimonies by witnesses at the Charbonneau Commission, on May 9, 2013, Laval mayor Gilles Vaillancourt was arrested on charges of fraud and gangsterism, and on June 17, 2013, Montreal interim mayor Michael Applebaum was arrested on charges of fraud, conspiracy, breach of trust, and corruption in municipal affairs in relation to actions between 2006 and 2012 when he was mayor of Côte-des-Neiges–Notre-Dame-de-Grâce. On June 18, 2013, Applebaum announced his resignation as mayor of Montreal, maintaining that the allegations against him were unfounded.

On December 1, 2016, Vaillancourt, as part of a plea deal, pleaded guilty to fraud, breach of trust and conspiracy for actions of corruption in awarding city construction contracts between 1996 and 2010. On December 15, he was sentenced to six years in prison and ordered to pay $9 million in restitution to the city from a Swiss bank account and other assets.

On January 26, 2017, Applebaum was found guilty of eight corruption-related charges. On March 30, 2017, Applebaum was sentenced to 12 months in prison and two years of probation. The judge said that Applebaum had committed "very serious" crimes.

== Aftermath and long-term impact ==
The commission's final report in November 2015 led to several reforms. These included the creation of the Autorité des marchés publics in 2017 to oversee public contracts. A monitoring committee reported in 2018 that approximately 70 to 80 percent of the 60 recommendations had been implemented, at least partially. An OECD review in 2020 examined Quebec's progress on public procurement integrity and noted advances but also remaining gaps.

Implementation has been described as partial, especially on reducing reliance on private engineering firms and strengthening whistleblower protection.

=== Additional judicial outcomes ===
In December 2020, the engineering firm CIMA+ was fined CA$3.2 million by the Competition Bureau of Canada for bid-rigging in public contracts.

In 2022, the Ordre des ingénieurs du Québec revoked the licence of a former engineer from Groupe SM for negligence linked to contract-sharing practices in Montreal.

=== Persistent issues and recent studies ===
Ten years after the report, independent analyses have highlighted ongoing challenges. A May 2025 study by the Institut de recherche et d'informations socioéconomiques (IRIS), authored by Colin Pratte, examined professional engineering services contracts for infrastructure in Montreal. It found that many structural problems persist despite the commission's recommendations to reduce subcontracting and rebuild internal expertise.

Key findings include:

- The total value of contracts awarded to engineering firms rose from $37.7 million in 2012 to $294.4 million in 2024 (average annual increase of 18%).
- Hourly rates billed by firms increased by 82% between 2012 and 2024 — more than double the Montreal consumer price index (+2.38% annually) and engineer salary growth (+2.79%).
- In 2024, the top five firms captured 76% of the contract value in the infrastructure sector.
- Framework agreements (ententes-cadres) grew from 35% to 93% of total contract value, reducing competition.
- 41% of contracts in 2024 were awarded with as many compliant bids as contracts offered (including single-bid cases).
- Estimated overcosts reached at least $40 million in 2024 alone (approximately 20% above fair market price).
- Internal witnesses reported a "company culture" of billing up to 50% fictitious hours on public contracts in some firms, along with declining quality of deliverables since 2019.

In a June 2025 interview with the Montreal Gazette, Pratte stated that "the prices are higher for services that are less good" and attributed the escalation to the city's failure to follow the Charbonneau Commission's warnings to reduce dependence on subcontracting.

The study concluded that the City of Montreal largely ignored key Charbonneau recommendations on rebalancing toward in-house expertise. This has led to market concentration, reduced competition, and higher costs for taxpayers. While no new illegal collusion cartel was proven, the legal and structural conditions (framework agreements, historical pricing, low number of bids) recreate dynamics similar to those before 2015.

The City of Montreal responded that it would analyze the report and noted some internal repatriation of tasks (e.g., snow removal).

Researchers and observers note that, as the commission itself warned, corruption and collusion evolve and cannot be eradicated permanently without continuous vigilance.

== In popular culture ==
Charbonneau (portrayed by Claudia Ferri) and the commission was portrayed in the television drama series Bad Blood, which debuted in 2017, surrounding the Rizzuto crime family.

== See also ==
- Unité permanente anticorruption
