= Laurent Blanchard =

Member of Montreal City Council

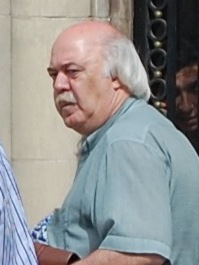

43rd Mayor of Montreal
- In office June 25, 2013 – November 14, 2013
- Preceded by: Jane Cowell-Poitras
- Succeeded by: Denis Coderre

Member of the Montreal Executive Committee responsible for finances, human resources, and legal affairs
- In office June 28, 2013 – November 14, 2013
- Preceded by: Michael Applebaum
- Succeeded by: Pierre Desrochers

Chair of the Montreal Executive Committee
- In office November 22, 2012 – June 25, 2013
- Preceded by: Michael Applebaum
- Succeeded by: Josée Duplessis

Member of the Montreal Executive Committee responsible for infrastructure, buildings, real estate transactions, information technology, and corporate communications
- In office November 22, 2012 – June 25, 2013
- Preceded by: Richard Deschamps (infrastructure), Michael Applebaum (corporate communications)
- Succeeded by: Richard Deschamps (infrastructure), Benoit Dorais (buildings and real estate transactions), Caroline Bourgeois (information technology and corporate communications)

Montreal City Councillor for Hochelaga
- In office 2005 – June 25, 2013
- Preceded by: Luc Larivée
- Succeeded by: Éric Alan Caldwell

Personal details
- Born: November 25, 1952 (age 73) Montreal, Quebec, Canada
- Party: Coalition Montréal (2013)
- Other political affiliations: Independent (2012-2013); Vision Montréal (2005-2012)

Laurent Blanchard (born November 25, 1952) is a politician in Montreal, Quebec, Canada. He represented the east-end Hochelaga ward on Montreal city council from 2005 to 2013, initially as a member of Vision Montreal and later as an independent. On June 25, 2013, he was elected by council as interim Mayor of Montreal, a position he served in until the election of Denis Coderre on November 3, 2013.

== Early life and career ==
Blanchard was born in Montreal's Mercier district and worked in the publishing sector before entering political life. He was for many years the owner and publisher of Les Nouvelles de l'Est and also became assistant to the president of Hebdos Télémédia in the late 1980s. Blanchard was a political attaché in mayor Jean Doré's administration from 1991 to 1994, working in internal affairs, and was director-general of the Corporation de développement de l’Est (CDEST) from 1995 to 2002.

== City councillor ==
Blanchard was first elected to city council in the 2005 municipal election, defeating incumbent councillor Luc Larivée from mayor Gérald Tremblay's Montreal Island Citizens Union (MICU). Tremblay's party won a majority on council, and Blanchard served as a member of the official opposition.

In 2006, Blanchard urged the Montreal Executive Committee to rescind a policy it had approved in camera the previous month, restricting Montreal civil servants from disclosing information deemed to be "confidential," "reserved," "for internal use" or "personal." Blanchard noted that this policy had never been presented to the full council. In the same period, he joined with fellow councillor Gaëtan Primeau in a "bathrobe protest," showing up to a 6 am budget meeting dressed in his bathrobe and arguing that the meeting had been scheduled too early for public participation.

Blanchard was re-elected in the 2009 municipal election. Tremblay's party, now renamed as Union Montreal, again won a majority on council, and Blanchard continued to serve as an opposition member.

In April 2011, following rising concerns about corruption in the awarding of municipal contracts, Tremblay appointed Blanchard to head a committee that would review contracts considered to "deviate from norms." Blanchard acknowledged in September 2012 that there were several restrictions on the types of contracts his committee could review, that it ultimately reviewed only five to ten percent of city council and island council contracts, and that it was almost never able to review borough-level contracts.

Tremblay resigned as mayor in November 2012 amid the backdrop of a growing corruption scandal, and Michael Applebaum was chosen by council as his successor. On November 22, 2012, Applebaum named Blanchard to chair the city's executive committee (i.e., the municipal cabinet) on November 22, 2012. The new mayor had previously announced that the committee chair would be non-partisan, and so, as a condition of his appointment, Blanchard resigned from Vision Montreal to serve as an independent member. He also held executive responsibilities for infrastructure, buildings, real estate transactions, information technology, and corporate communications.

In April 2013, Applebaum and Blanchard announced that the company Dessau would be banned from bidding on public contracts for five years, after a former senior vice-president testified before the Charbonneau Commission on municipal corruption that the company had taken part in collusion and price inflation.

== Mayor ==
Michael Applebaum resigned as mayor on June 18, 2013, after being charged with fourteen criminal offenses including fraud and corruption; he maintains that he is innocent. Blanchard was selected as the new interim mayor of the city on June 25, 2013. He obtained 30 of 61 votes from the city council, against 28 votes for Harout Chitilian and three votes for acting mayor Jane Cowell-Poitras. Two additional candidates, François Croteau and Alan DeSousa, withdrew their names in advance of voting. Following the vote, Projet Montréal leader Richard Bergeron commented, "With Laurent Blanchard, we have the assurance that we will have no unpleasant surprises to be afraid of. Laurent Blanchard is above all suspicion. I think Montrealers have seen enough for now."

Blanchard has said that the central theme of his interim mayoralty will be, "The city continues to function." He announced his new executive committee on June 28, 2013, making only minor changes from the previous committee's membership. In addition to serving as mayor, Blanchard has executive responsibility for finances, human resources, and legal affairs. He is not seeking re-election as mayor in the 2013 municipal election.

In August 2013, Blanchard reluctantly announced that municipal contracts for infrastructure renewal would go to SNC-Lavalin and BPR, firms that had previously been cited at the Charbonneau Commission for alleged bid-rigging. In explaining this decision, he noted that the relevant call for tenders had been issued in late 2012, a few weeks before the city adopted more stringent contracting rules; he further argued that issuing a new call would result in delays and unsafe road conditions. "It wasn't an easy decision, but, legally, we had no choice," Blanchard said. "We understand that Montrealers will ask 'why?'"

Blanchard automatically served as a member of the Mercier–Hochelaga-Maisonneuve borough council during his term as city councillor for Hochelaga. After becoming mayor of Montreal, he automatically became mayor of the Ville-Marie borough council.

His legacy as interim mayor of Montreal was approving "a piece of art in Montreal North [which caused] some debate over its $1.1 million price tag."

=== Executive committee membership ===
| Name | Party | Position |
|---|---|---|
| Josée Duplessis | Projet Montréal | Chair of the executive committee Sustainable development, environment, parks and green spaces |
| Benoit Dorais | Vision Montreal | Vice-chair of the executive committee Major projects, housing and social housing, buildings, real estate transactions |
| Émilie Thuillier | Projet Montréal | Vice-chair of the executive committee Social and community development, family, seniors, youth, women |
| Élaine Ayotte | Independent | Culture, heritage and design |
| Michel Bissonnet | Independent | Government and international relations, 375th anniversary celebrations, Space for Life |
| Laurent Blanchard | Independent | Mayor of Montreal; Finances, human resources, legal affairs |
| Caroline Bourgeois | Vision Montreal | Information technology, corporate communications, municipal records |
| Mary Deros | Independent | Cultural communities |
| Richard Deschamps | Independent | Sports and leisure, infrastructure, supply |
| Christian Dubois | Independent | Public security, citizen services |
| Réal Ménard | Vision Montreal | Transportation, fleet vehicles |
| Alain Tassé | Independent | Economic and urban development, water |

Source: Executive Committee, City of Montreal, accessed 11 July 2013.

== Electoral record ==
2013 Montreal municipal election: Councillor, Hochelaga
| Party | Candidate | Votes | % | ±% |
|---|---|---|---|---|
| Projet Montréal | Éric Alan Caldwell | 3,408 | 35.18 | +5.61 |
| Coalition Montréal | Laurent Blanchard (incumbent mayor) | 2,739 | 28.28 | −29.08 |
| Vrai changement | Mikael St-Pierre | 2,013 | 20.78 | |
| Équipe Denis Coderre | Patrick Charbonneau | 1,244 | 12.84 | |
| Independent | Nicole Donnelly | 282 | 2.91 | |
| Total valid votes | | 9,686 | 97.06 | |
| Total rejected ballots | | 293 | 2.94 | |
| Turnout | | 9,979 | 42.01 | +4.44 |
| Electors on the lists | | 23,755 | | |
Source: Election results, 2013, City of Montreal.

2009 Montreal municipal election: Councillor, Hochelaga
| Party | Candidate | Votes | % | ±% |
|---|---|---|---|---|
| Vision Montreal | Laurent Blanchard (incumbent) | 4,965 | 57.36 | +10.90 |
| Projet Montréal | Éric Alan Caldwell | 2,560 | 29.57 | +12.03 |
| Union Montreal | Louis Cléroux | 1,131 | 13.07 | −22.94 |
| Total valid votes | | 8,656 | 96.73 | |
| Total rejected ballots | | 293 | 3.27 | |
| Turnout | | 8,949 | 37.57 | |
| Electors on the lists | | 23,817 | | |
Source: Election results, 2009, City of Montreal.

2005 Montreal municipal election: Councillor, Hochelaga
| Party | Candidate | Votes | % | ±% |
|---|---|---|---|---|
| Vision Montreal | Laurent Blanchard | 2,877 | 46.46 | −17.62 |
| Citizens Union | Luc Larivée (incumbent) | 2,230 | 36.01 | +10.48 |
| Projet Montréal | José Feliciano Arias | 1,086 | 17.54 | – |
| Total valid votes | | 6,193 | – | – |
Source: Election results, 1833-2005 (in French), City of Montreal.
