= Carl Boileau =

Canadian politician

Plateau-Mont-Royal Borough Councillor for De Lorimier
- In office 2009–2013
- Preceded by: Josée Duplessis
- Succeeded by: Marianne Giguère

Personal details
- Party: Vision Montréal

Carl Boileau is a politician in Montreal, Quebec, Canada. He was elected to the Montreal City council in 2005 as a co-listed candidate with Projet Montréal leader Richard Bergeron, but did not serve. From 2009 to 2013, he was a member of the Plateau-Mont-Royal borough council.

== Early life and political career ==
Boileau was born and raised in Le Plateau-Mont-Royal area and was a Parti Québécois (PQ) youth representative in the early 2000s.

In 2001, he sought the PQ nomination for a by-election in the Montreal division of Mercier. This nomination contest was marked by significant divisions in the party, after early frontrunner Yves Michaud was forced to resign following a series of controversial remarks involving Quebec nationalism, immigration, and Quebec's Jewish community. Michaud's supporters, including Boileau, argued that his comments had been unfairly distorted to present him in an unflattering light. In his nomination speech, Boileau accused the PQ leadership of "dictatorial electoral machinations" and received applause for saying, "Mr. Michaud, you were never a racist in our eyes." He was defeated by Claudel Toussaint, a candidate of the party establishment.

In 2002, Boileau argued that right-wing members of Bernard Landry's government should leave the PQ and join the rival Action démocratique du Québec (ADQ). He helped to form the municipal party Projet Montréal in 2004.

== 2005 election ==
In the 2005 municipal election, Boileau ran as a co-listed candidate with mayoral candidate Richard Bergeron for the De Lorimier ward on Montreal city council. (Under the rules governing Montreal municipal elections, mayoral candidates may also run for council seats, "co-listed" with other members of their party. If the co-listed candidate wins the council seat and the mayoral candidate is defeated for mayor, then the mayoral candidate may claim the council seat.)

Boileau was elected in a difficult contest for the De Lorimier ward and, as such, became the first Projet Montréal candidate to be elected anywhere in the city. Bergeron was able to claim the council seat, however, as he was defeated in the mayoral contest.

== Borough councillor ==
Boileau was elected to the Plateau-Mont-Royal borough council for De Lorimier in the 2009 municipal election. Projet Montréal won all seven borough seats in this election and formed a local administration under Luc Ferrandez.

Boileau was the first councillor in Montreal to utilize a 2009 bylaw allowing citizens to request public consultation on municipal or borough issues via citizen petitions (five thousand signatures are required for borough issues, fifteen thousand for issues affecting the entire city). Boileau collected thirty thousand signatures to launch city-wide discussions on urban agriculture. In early 2013, city councillor Marvin Rotrand indicated that many of the ideas brought forward at the resulting public meetings had subsequently been or would be incorporated into city policy.

Boileau resigned from Projet Montréal in October 2012, charging that the local Ferrandez administration had become undemocratic. He joined the rival Vision Montreal party in March 2013.

== Electoral record ==
2013 Montreal municipal election: Borough councillor, De Lorimier
Party	Candidate	Votes	%	±%
Projet Montréal	Marianne Giguère	6,771	52.47	+4.35
Coalition Montréal	Carl Boileau (incumbent)	3,587	27.80	-10.46
Équipe Denis Coderre	Nam Truong	1,586	12.29	
Independent	Sophie Stéphanie Lapierre	960	7.44	
Total valid votes		12,904	100	
Total rejected ballots		416		
Turnout		13,320	57.54	
Electors on the lists		23,148		
Source: Election results, 2013, City of Montreal.

2009 Montreal municipal election: Borough councillor, De Lorimier
Party	Candidate	Votes	%	±%
Projet Montréal	Carl Boileau	5,242	48.12	+11.81
Vision Montreal	Christine Fréchette	4,168	38.26	+11.00
Union Montreal	Nicolas Kobrynsky	1,484	13.62	−22.80
Total valid votes		10,894	96.95	–
Total rejected ballots		343	3.05	–
Turnout		11,237	47.61	–
Electors on the lists		23,602	–	–
Source: Election results, 2009, City of Montreal.

2005 Montreal municipal election: Councillor, De Lorimier
Party	Candidate	Votes	%
Projet Montréal	Carl Boileau co-listed with Richard Bergeron	3,078	36.53
Montreal Island Citizens Union	Christine Mitton	2,838	33.69
Vision Montreal	Christine Poulin (incumbent)	2,509	29.78
Total valid votes		8,425	100
Source: City of Montreal official results (in French), City of Montreal.
