= Richard Ryan (politician) =

Canadian politician

Montreal city councillor for Mile-End
- In office 2013–2021
- Preceded by: Alex Norris
- Succeeded by: Marie Plourde

Ville-Marie Borough Councillor, appointed by the Mayor of Montreal (with Anne-Marie Sigouin)
- In office 2017–2021
- Preceded by: Jean-Marc Gibeau and Karine Boivin Roy

Le Plateau-Mont-Royal borough councillor for Mile-End
- In office 2009–2013
- Preceded by: Eleni Fakotakis-Kolaitis
- Succeeded by: Marie Plourde

Personal details
- Party: Projet Montréal

Richard Ryan is a politician in Montreal, Quebec, Canada. He served on the Plateau-Mont-Royal borough council beginning in 2009 and on the Montreal city council beginning in 2013 as a member of Projet Montréal.

== Private career ==
Ryan was a prominent member of the Mile End Citizens' Committee before entering political life. He helped to organize a series of meetings in Montreal's Mile End neighbourhood in early 2009 to encourage greater citizen involvement in urban planning, after the Plateau-Mont-Royal borough council announced a nine-million dollar revitalization program for the area's former industrial zone.

== Political career ==
=== Borough councillor ===
Ryan was first elected to the Plateau-Mont-Royal borough council in the 2009 Montreal municipal election, defeating Union Montreal incumbent Eleni Fakotakis-Kolaitis for the Mile-End borough council seat. Projet Montréal won ten city council seats in this election to become the third-largest party at the municipal level; in Plateau-Mont-Royal, it won all seven available seats to become the governing party. In his first term, Ryan advocated for a pedestrian level crossing between the Mile-End and Rosemont neighbourhoods, supported a pilot project for urban beehives, and helped facilitate a deal to prevent a community of artists from being forced out of Mile End's former industrial area due to gentrification.

=== City councillor ===
Ryan was elected for Mile-End's city council seat in the 2013 municipal election, in which Projet Montréal emerged as the official opposition on city council and once again won every seat in Plateau-Mont-Royal.

In early 2014, Ryan introduced a motion requesting that the government of Quebec grant the city of Montreal greater powers to create social and affordable housing. He later urged the provincial government to restrict sharp increases in the prices of commercial leases, following reports of some store owners being forced out of business.

Ryan joined with three other Projet Montréal councillors to sleep outdoors at Concordia University on a cold night in March 2015, in conjunction with Stop Homelessness Action Week. In 2016, he called for the city to tackle unsanitary housing via inspections and follow-ups, rather than relying on fines that were often ignored by landlords.

In August 2017, he urged the city of Montreal and its police force to apologize for conducting violent raids on LGBTQ bars in years past. He was quoted as saying, "We have a duty to remember that it happened. And also to recognize those who fought against institutionalized homophobia at the time who are still living here in our community." Ryan himself came out as bisexual in 2016.

Ryan has organized "Jane's Walk" events in Plateau-Mont-Royal, inspired by the legacy of Jane Jacobs. In 2014, he was quoted as saying, "The idea [behind the walks] is to allow people to discover their neighbourhoods in a sort of alternative manner. People often like to walk through their neighbourhoods to perhaps discover a new area or a new shopping district. Jane's Walks brings us to another philosophy, which is what are the urban development challenges in our district? What changes came about because of citizen involvement? What changes have elected officials been able to achieve?"

In the 2017 municipal election, he proposed that the city make greater use of an existing strategy to encourage housing promoters to provide 30 per cent social and affordable housing in return for some local by-law exemptions (e.g., receiving permission to construct more storeys than would normally be allowed).

Ryan was re-elected in the 2017 election, as Project Montréal won the mayoral contest and a majority of seats on city council, as well as winning all seats in Plateau-Mont-Royal for the third consecutive time. Following the election, he was appointed as chair of the city committee on economic and urban development and housing.

By virtue of holding his seat on city council, Ryan also continues to serve on the Plateau-Mont-Royal borough council. In November 2017, he also became one of two councillors directly appointed by new mayor Valérie Plante to the Ville-Marie borough council.

== Electoral record ==
2017 Montreal municipal election: Councillor, Mile-End
| Party | Candidate | Votes | % | ±% |
|---|---|---|---|---|
| Projet Montréal | Richard Ryan (incumbent) | 7,171 | 71.15 | +12.80 |
| Équipe Denis Coderre | Iris Almeida-Côté | 2,628 | 26.08 | +10.96 |
| Plateau sans frontières | Halil Sustam | 279 | 2.77 | -4.71 |
| Total valid votes | | 10,078 | 100 | – |
| Total rejected ballots | | 255 | – | – |
| Turnout | | 10,333 | 48.33 | -2.69 |
| Electors on the lists | | 21,380 | – | – |
Source: Election results, 2017, City of Montreal.

2013 Montreal municipal election: Councillor, Mile-End
| Party | Candidate | Votes | % | ±% |
|---|---|---|---|---|
| Projet Montréal | Richard Ryan | 6,126 | 58.35 | +10.84 |
| Coalition Montréal | Galia Vaillancourt | 2,000 | 19.05 | -9.40 |
| Équipe Denis Coderre | Alain Clavet | 1,587 | 15.12 | |
| Intégrité Montréal | Isabelle Tremblay | 785 | 7.48 | |
| Total valid votes | | 10,498 | 100 | – |
| Total rejected ballots | | 382 | – | – |
| Turnout | | 10,880 | 51.02 | +8.40 |
| Electors on the lists | | 21,326 | – | – |
Source: Election results, 2013, City of Montreal.

2009 Montreal municipal election: Borough councillor, Mile-End
| Party | Candidate | Votes | % | ±% |
|---|---|---|---|---|
| Projet Montréal | Richard Ryan | 4,349 | 48.52 | |
| Vision Montreal | Michel Pauzé | 2,555 | 28.51 | |
| Union Montreal | Eleni Fakotakis-Kolaitis (incumbent) | 2,059 | 22.97 | |
| Total valid votes | | 8,963 | 100 | – |
| Total rejected ballots | | 290 | – | – |
| Turnout | | 9,253 | 42.60 | – |
| Electors on the lists | | 21,719 | – | – |
Source: Election results, 2009, City of Montreal.
