= 2013 Montreal municipal election =

Election in Quebec, Canada

- November 3 2013
- Mayoral election
- November 3, 2013
- Registered: 1,142,948
- Turnout: 43.32%
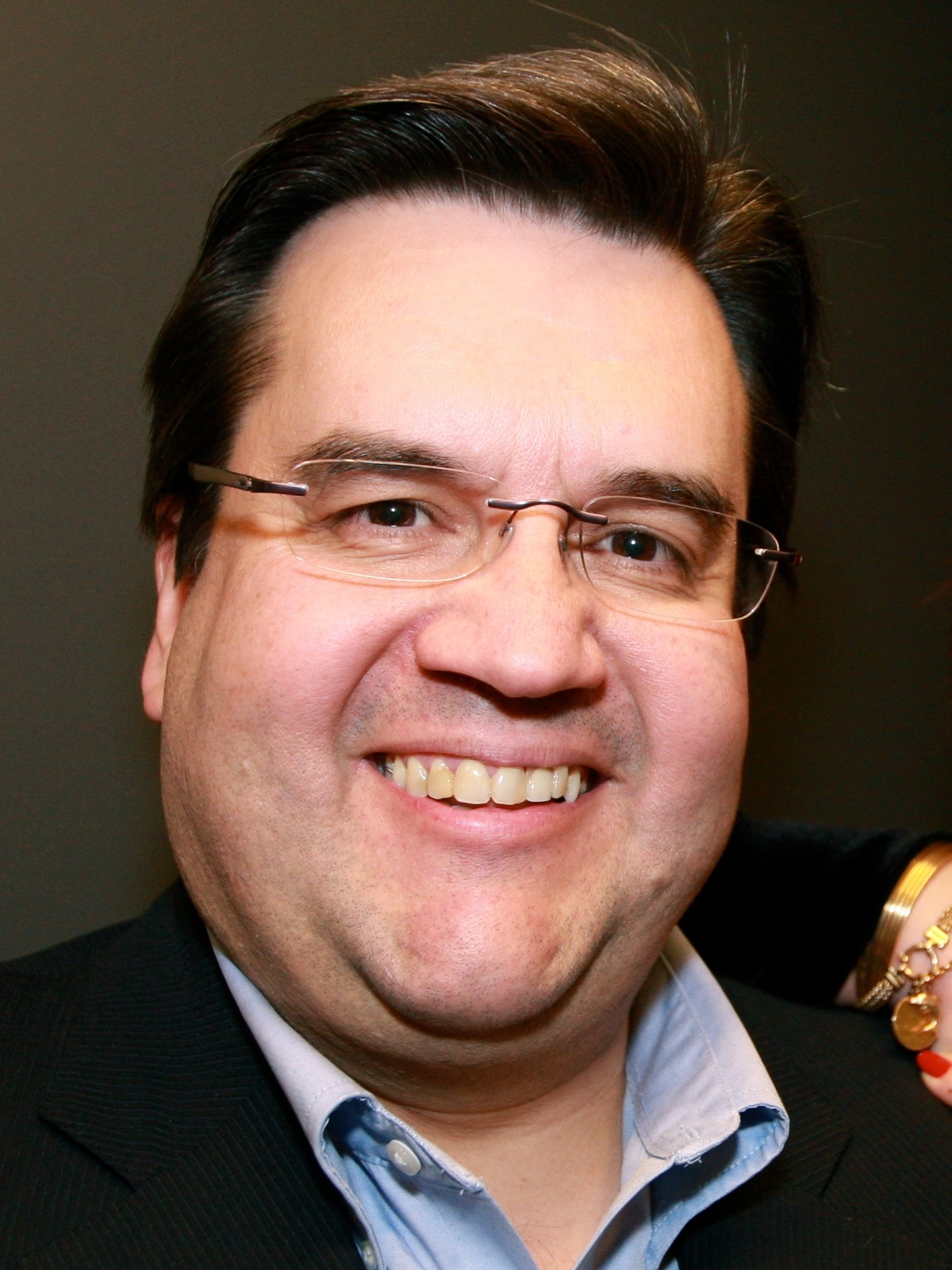

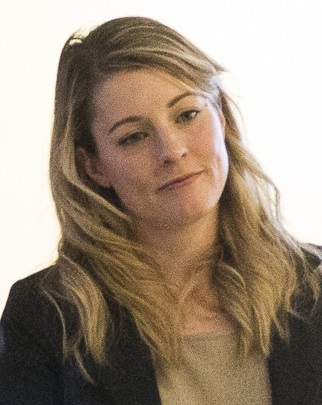

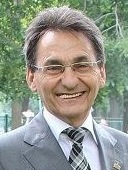
Nominee	Denis Coderre	Mélanie Joly
Party	Équipe Denis Coderre	Vrai changement
Popular vote	149,467	123,062
Percentage	32.15%	26.47%
		CM
Nominee	Richard Bergeron	Marcel Côté
Party	Projet Montréal	Coalition Montréal
Popular vote	118,637	59,490
Percentage	25.52%	12.79%
Mayor before election
Laurent Blanchard
Coalition Montréal
Elected mayor
Denis Coderre
Équipe Denis Coderre
- City Council election
- November 3, 2013
- 65 seats on Montreal City Council (Note: The mayor is a member of City Council, but for the purposes of documentation is treated as their own individual.); 33 seats needed for a majority
Party	Leader	Seats	+/–
Équipe Denis Coderre	Denis Coderre	26	+26
Projet Montréal	Richard Bergeron	20	+10
Coalition Montréal	Marcel Côté	6	+6
Vrai changement pour Montréal	Mélanie Joly	4	+4
Équipe Anjou	Luis Miranda	2	+2
Équipe Barbe Team	Manon Barbe	2	+2
Équipe Dauphin	Claude Dauphin	2	+2
Équipe conservons Outremont	Marie Cinq-Mars	1	+1
This lists parties that won seats. See the complete results below.

Municipal elections were held in the city of Montreal, Quebec, Canada, on November 3, 2013, as part of the 2013 Quebec municipal elections. Voters elected 65 positions on the Montreal City Council, including the mayor, borough mayors, and city councillors, as well as 38 borough councillors. Denis Coderre replaced interim mayor Laurent Blanchard, who was elected to replace the previous interim mayor, Michael Applebaum, who resigned due to 14 charges laid against him including fraud, conspiracy, breach of trust, and corruption in municipal affairs. Previous elected mayor Gérald Tremblay left office on November 5, 2012, after his party Union Montréal was suspected of corruption and mafia involvement. On July 2, 2013, Louise Harel, leader of the opposition Vision Montréal, announced she would not be running for mayor, instead supporting Marcel Côté.

Results for borough mayor

Results for city councillor

Results for borough councillor

== Final list of Mayor of Montreal candidates ==
=== Confirmed ===
Name	Leader of Municipal Party (if applicable)	Other notes
Richard Bergeron	Projet Montréal (Équipe Bergeron)	Urban planner
Denis Coderre	Équipe Denis Coderre pour Montréal (Équipe Denis Coderre)	Former Liberal MP
Marcel Côté	Coalition Montréal (Coalition Montréal Marcel Côté)	Co-founder of SECOR
Mélanie Joly	Vrai changement pour Montréal (Groupe Mélanie Joly)	Lawyer
Claude Blais	Independent	
Louai Hamida	Independent	Quality control engineer
Clément Sauriol	Independent	Freelance worker
Kofi Sonokpon	Independent	Aeronautics expert
Patricia Tulasne	Independent	Actress (TV+cinema)
Joseph Young	Independent	
Michel Brûlé	Independent	Author and publisher

=== Withdrawn ===
On October 30, Paunel Paterne Matondot decided to withdraw his nomination as mayor of Montreal at the election of November 3.

=== Declined ===
- Raymond Bachand - MNA for Outremont
- Michel Bédard - Former candidate
- Gilles Duceppe - Former Leader of the Bloc Québécois
- Liza Frulla - Former MP
- Louise Harel - Leader of Vision Montréal
- Michel Labrecque - STM President
- David La Haye - Actor, producer
- Normand Legault - Entrepreneur
- Irois Léger - Former journalist
- Gilbert Rozon - Founder of Just for Laughs

== Opinion polls ==
=== For mayor ===
Denis Coderre's support remained steady in public opinion polling during the campaign, while the other established "major" candidates – Marcel Côté and Richard Bergeron – largely failed to make an impression. Instead, a lesser-known candidate, Mélanie Joly, pulled ahead of both Côté and Bergeron in public opinion polling to emerge as the second-place contender by the time of the final published poll.

Polling firm	Last date of polling	Link	Coderre	Côté	Bergeron	Joly	Other
CROP	October 15, 2013	HTML	41	11	21	24	2
Léger Marketing	October 5, 2013	HTML	39	17	23	16	5

Opinion polling prior to campaign
Polling firm	Last date of polling	Link	Coderre	Harel	Bergeron	Other	None of these	Don't know/ Wouldn't vote
CROP	May 12, 2013	PDF	33	15	18	5	1	28
2009 Election	November 2, 2009	HTML	—	32.73	25.45	41.82	—	—

== Results ==
Denis Coderre confirmed polls before the election by winning the post of mayor of Montreal with 32.15% of votes and with a majority of 26,405 votes over Mélanie Joly, his closest rival.

His party, Équipe Coderre pour Montréal, gained 27 of the 65 seats within the city council. Meanwhile, Projet Montréal, led by Richard Bergeron, gained the status of official opposition by winning 20 seats. Marcel Côté's Coalition Montréal won only 6 seats and Mélanie Joly's Vrai changement pour Montréal won 4.

=== Composition of city and borough councils ===
Depending on their borough, Montrealers voted for:

- Mayor of Montreal
- Borough mayor (except in Ville-Marie, whose mayor is the Mayor of Montreal), who is also a city councillor
- A city councillor for the whole borough or each district, who is also a borough councillor (Outremont and L'Île-Bizard–Sainte-Geneviève have no city councillors other than the borough mayor)
- Zero, one, or two additional borough councillors for each district

Borough	District	Borough Councillors			
Borough	District	City Councillors		Borough Councillor	Borough Councillor
Borough	District	Borough Mayor	City Councillor	Borough Councillor	Borough Councillor
Ahuntsic-Cartierville	Ahuntsic	Pierre Gagnier	Émilie Thuillier		
Ahuntsic-Cartierville	Bordeaux-Cartierville	Pierre Gagnier	Harout Chitilian		
Ahuntsic-Cartierville	Saint-Sulpice	Pierre Gagnier	Pierre Desrochers		
Ahuntsic-Cartierville	Sault-au-Récollet	Pierre Gagnier	Lorraine Pagé		
Anjou	Centre	Luis Miranda	Andrée Hénault	Michelle Zammit	
Anjou	East	Luis Miranda	Andrée Hénault	Paul-Yvon Perron	
Anjou	West	Luis Miranda	Andrée Hénault	Gilles Beaudry	
Côte-des-Neiges– Notre-Dame-de-Grâce	Côte-des-Neiges	Russell Copeman	Magda Popeanu		
Côte-des-Neiges– Notre-Dame-de-Grâce	Darlington	Russell Copeman	Lionel Perez		
Côte-des-Neiges– Notre-Dame-de-Grâce	Loyola	Russell Copeman	Jeremy Searle		
Côte-des-Neiges– Notre-Dame-de-Grâce	Notre-Dame-de-Grâce	Russell Copeman	Peter McQueen		
Côte-des-Neiges– Notre-Dame-de-Grâce	Snowdon	Russell Copeman	Marvin Rotrand		
L'Île-Bizard– Sainte-Geneviève	Denis-Benjamin-Viger	Normand Marinacci		Christian Larocque	
L'Île-Bizard– Sainte-Geneviève	Jacques-Bizard	Normand Marinacci		Jean-D. Lévesque-René	
L'Île-Bizard– Sainte-Geneviève	Pierre-Foretier	Normand Marinacci		Stéphane Côté	
L'Île-Bizard– Sainte-Geneviève	Sainte-Geneviève	Normand Marinacci		Éric Dugas	
Lachine	Du Canal	Claude Dauphin	Jean-François Cloutier	Maja Vodanovic	
Lachine	Fort-Rolland	Claude Dauphin	Jean-François Cloutier	Kymberley Simonyik	
Lachine	J.-Émery-Provost	Claude Dauphin	Jean-François Cloutier	Daniel Racicot	
LaSalle	Cecil-P.-Newman	Manon Barbe	Monique Vallée	Serge Declos	Josée Troilo
LaSalle	Sault-Saint-Louis	Manon Barbe	Richard Deschamps	Nancy Blanchet	Laura-Ann Palestini
Mercier– Hochelaga-Maisonneuve	Hochelaga	Réal Ménard	Éric Alan Caldwell		
Mercier– Hochelaga-Maisonneuve	Louis-Riel	Réal Ménard	Karine Boivin Roy		
Mercier– Hochelaga-Maisonneuve	Maisonneuve–Longue-Pointe	Réal Ménard	Laurence L. Lalonde		
Mercier– Hochelaga-Maisonneuve	Tétreaultville	Réal Ménard	Richard Celzi		
Montréal-Nord	Marie-Clarac	Gilles Deguire	Chantal Rossi	Monica Ricourt	
Montréal-Nord	Ovide-Clermont	Gilles Deguire	Jean-Marc Gibeau	Sylvia Lo Bianco	
Outremont	Claude-Ryan	Marie Cinq-Mars		Mindy Pollak	
Outremont	Jeanne-Sauvé	Marie Cinq-Mars		Jacqueline Gremaud	
Outremont	Joseph-Beaubien	Marie Cinq-Mars		Céline Forget	
Outremont	Robert-Bourassa	Marie Cinq-Mars		Lucie Cardyn	
Pierrefonds-Roxboro	Bois-de-Liesse	Dimitrios (Jim) Beis	Justine McIntyre	Roger Trottier	
Pierrefonds-Roxboro	Cap-Saint-Jacques	Dimitrios (Jim) Beis	Catherine Clément-Talbot	Yves Gignac	
Le Plateau-Mont-Royal	DeLorimier	Luc Ferrandez	Louise Mainville	Marianne Giguère	
Le Plateau-Mont-Royal	Jeanne-Mance	Luc Ferrandez	Alex Norris	Christine Gosselin	
Le Plateau-Mont-Royal	Mile-End	Luc Ferrandez	Richard Ryan	Marie Plourde	
Rivière-des-Prairies– Pointe-aux-Trembles	La Pointe-aux-Prairies	Chantal Rouleau	Richard Guay	Manuel Guedes	
Rivière-des-Prairies– Pointe-aux-Trembles	Pointe-aux-Trembles	Chantal Rouleau	Suzanne Décarie	Gilles Déziel	
Rivière-des-Prairies– Pointe-aux-Trembles	Rivière-des-Prairies	Chantal Rouleau	Giovanni Rapanà	Nathalie Pierre-Antoine	
Rosemont– La Petite-Patrie	Étienne-Desmarteau	François Croteau	Marc-André Gadoury		
Rosemont– La Petite-Patrie	Marie-Victorin	François Croteau	Guillaume Lavoie		
Rosemont– La Petite-Patrie	Saint-Édouard	François Croteau	François Limoges		
Rosemont– La Petite-Patrie	Vieux-Rosemont	François Croteau	Érika Duchesne		
Saint-Laurent	Côte-de-Liesse	Alan DeSousa	Francesco Miele	Maurice Cohen	
Saint-Laurent	Norman-McLaren	Alan DeSousa	Aref Salem	Michèle Biron	
Saint-Léonard	Saint-Léonard-Est	Michel Bissonnet	Domenico Moschella	Lili-Anne Tremblay	
Saint-Léonard	Saint-Léonard-Ouest	Michel Bissonnet	Dominic Perri	Mario Battista	
Le Sud-Ouest	Saint-Henri–Petite-Bourgogne– Pointe-Saint-Charles	Benoit Dorais	Craig Sauvé	Sophie Thiébaut	
Le Sud-Ouest	Saint-Paul–Émard	Benoit Dorais	Anne-Marie Sigouin	Alain Vaillancourt	
Verdun	Champlain–L'Île-des-Sœurs	Jean-F. Parenteau	Manon Gauthier	Pierre L'Heureux	Marie-Eve Brunet
Verdun	Desmarchais-Crawford	Jean-F. Parenteau	Sterling Downey	Luc Gagnon	Marie-Andrée Mauger
Ville-Marie	Peter-McGill	(Mayor of Montreal)	Steve Shanahan		
Ville-Marie	Saint-Jacques	(Mayor of Montreal)	Richard Bergeron		
Ville-Marie	Sainte-Marie	(Mayor of Montreal)	Valérie Plante		
Villeray–Saint-Michel– Parc-Extension	François-Perrault	Anie Samson	Sylvain Ouellet		
Villeray–Saint-Michel– Parc-Extension	Parc-Extension	Anie Samson	Mary Deros		
Villeray–Saint-Michel– Parc-Extension	Saint-Michel	Anie Samson	Frantz Benjamin		
Villeray–Saint-Michel– Parc-Extension	Villeray	Anie Samson	Elsie Lefebvre		

== Seat-by-seat results ==
Nominations were open from September 20 to October 4.

=== Candidate statistics ===
Party names are the official ones registered with Élection Montréal.

Union Montréal was officially dissolved on May 9, 2013.

Party	Abbrev.	Number of candidates for			Total	Link
Party	Abbrev.	Borough mayor	City councillor	Borough councillor	Total	Link
Total positions open		18	46	38	102	
Coalition Montréal - Marcel Côté	CM	16	46	34	96	
Équipe Andrée Champoux pour Verdun	EAC	1	2	4	7	
Équipe Anjou	EA	1	1	3	5	
Équipe Barbe Team - Pro action LaSalle	PAL	1	2	4	7	
Équipe conservons Outremont	ECO	1	0	4	5	
Équipe Dauphin Lachine	EDL	1	1	3	5	
Équipe Denis Coderre pour Montréal	EDC	17	45	37	99	
Équipe Richard Bélanger	ERB	1	0	4	5	
Équipe Savard - Option Verdun / Montréal	OVM	1	2	4	7	
Intégrité Montréal	IM	5	17	2	24	
Parti alternatif LaSalle Alternative Party	LAP	1	1	2	4	
Projet Montréal - Équipe Bergeron	PM	18	46	38	102	
Vrai changement pour Montréal - Groupe Mélanie Joly	VCM	9	26	20	55	
Independents	Ind	4	22	21	47	
Total candidates		77	211	180	468	

=== Ahuntsic-Cartierville ===
Electoral District	Eligible voters	Position	Turnout	Candidates					Incumbent	Result
Electoral District	Eligible voters	Position	Turnout	Équipe Coderre	Coalition	Projet Montréal	VCM	Other	Incumbent	Result
—	84,524	Borough mayor	48.47%	Pierre Gagnier; 12,063 (30.41%)	Étienne Brunet; 6,728 (16.96%)	Pierre Bastien; 10,705 (26.99%)	Hasmig Belleli; 9,167 (23.11%)	Claude Allard (IM); 1,001 (2.52%)	Pierre Gagnier	EDC hold
Ahuntsic	21,134	City councillor	54.23%	Diane Rodrigue; 2,573 (23.00%)	Chantal Jorg; 1,512 (13.52%)	Émilie Thuillier; 4,450 (39.78%)	Laurette Racine; 2,333 (20.86%)	Julie Ducharme (IM); 318 (2.84%)	Émilie Thuillier	PM hold
Bordeaux-Cartierville	21,159	City councillor	40.99%	Harout Chitilian; 4,107 (48.86%)	Jean Héon; 1,001 (11.91%)	Maria Ximena Florez; 1,442 (17.15%)	Ibrahim Bruno El-Khoury; 1,492 (18.86%)	Ali Belkacem (Ind.); 270 (3.21%); Marc Essertaize (IM); 94 (1.12%)	Harout Chitilian	EDC hold
Saint-Sulpice	22,266	City councillor	46.30%	Pierre Desrochers; 3,477 (35.45%)	Jean-Jacques Lapointe; 2,182 (22.25%)	Martin Bazinet; 3,468 (35.36%)		Martin Félip Rainville (IM); 681 (6.94%)	Jocelyn Ann Campbell	EDC gain from Ind.
Sault-au-Récollet	19,965	City councillor	52.50%	Nathalie Hotte; 2,883 (28.47%)	Louis-Gilles Molyneux; 1,247 (12.31%)	Sophie-Anne Legendre; 2,674 (26.40%)	Lorraine Pagé; 2,884 (28.48%)	Mario Lemieux (IM); 263 (2.60%); Dominique Grondin (Ind.); 108 (1.07%); Nathalie Nyangono (Ind.); 69 (0.68%)	Étienne Brunet	VCM gain from CM

=== Anjou ===
Electoral District	Eligible voters	Position	Turnout	Candidates				Incumbent	Result
Electoral District	Eligible voters	Position	Turnout	Équipe Coderre	Coalition	Projet Montréal	Équipe Anjou	Incumbent	Result
—	29,172	Borough mayor	49.45%	Rémi Tondreau; 3,412 (24.49%)	Nyrlande Marcellus; 903 (6.48%)	René Obregon; 1,752 (12.57%)	Luis Miranda; 7,868 (56.46%)	Luis Miranda	EA hold
—	29,172	City councillor	49.39%	Youssef Hariri; 3,263 (23.63%)	Charlotte Watson-Moreau; 1,120 (8.11%)	Daniel Attard; 1,962 (14.21%)	Andrée Hénault; 7,465 (54.06%)	Andrée Hénault	EA hold
Centre	10,802	Borough councillor	51.41%	Angela Mancini; 1,633 (30.84%)	Mona Moussalem; 345 (6.52%)	Jean-Sébastien Roussy; 863 (16.30%)	Michelle Di Genova Zammit; 2,454 (46.35%)	Michelle Di Genova Zammit	EA hold
East	8,722	Borough councillor	47.97%	Sylvain Plourde; 951 (23.62%)	Boubacar Touré; 306 (7.60%)	Nadia Edouard; 680 (16.89%)	Paul-Yvon Perron; 2,089 (51.89%)	Paul-Yvon Perron	EA hold
West	9,648	Borough councillor	49.08%	Agata La Rosa; 1,274 (28.30%)	Mona Sara; 348 (7.73%)	Blaise Guillotte; 567 (12.60%)	Gilles Beaudry; 2,312 (51.37%)	Gilles Beaudry	EA hold

=== Côte-des-Neiges–Notre-Dame-de-Grâce ===
Electoral District	Eligible voters	Position	Turnout	Candidates					Incumbent	Result
Electoral District	Eligible voters	Position	Turnout	Équipe Coderre	Coalition	Projet Montréal	VCM	Other	Incumbent	Result
—	94,587	Borough mayor	38.74%	Kevin Copps; 7,880 (22.12%)	Russell Copeman; 10,482 (29.42%)	Michael Simkin; 9,348 (26.24%)	Andrew Ross; 7,918 (22.22%)		Lionel Perez	CM gain from EDC
Côte-des-Neiges	15,870	City councillor	40.86%	Helen Fotopulos; 1,876 (29.65%)	Albert Perez; Co-candidate for Marcel Côté; 1,181 (18.66%)	Magda Popeanu; 1,953 (30.86%)	Raphaël Assor; 1,267 (20.02%)	Elizabeth Siazon (Ind.); 51 (0.81%)	Helen Fotopulos	PM gain from EDC
Darlington	17,200	City councillor	34.02%	Lionel Perez; 2,016 (35.72%)	Erik Hamon; 1,692 (29.98%)	Kianoush Rashidan; 899 (15.93%)	Kamala Jegatheeswaran; 1,037 (18.37%)		Vacant	EDC gain
Loyola	20,927	City councillor	37.44%	Ruth Rosenfield; 1,325 (17.28%)	Margaret Ford; 1,267 (16.52%)	Christian Arseneault; 1,441 (18.79%)	Kashmir Singh Randhawa; 1,305 (17.02%)	Jeremy Searle (Ind.): 1,795 (23.41%); George Pentsos (Ind.): 436 (5.69%); Deborah Rankin (Ind.): 100 (1.30%)	Susan Clarke	Ind. gain from Ind.
Notre-Dame-de-Grâce	21,159	City councillor	45.61%	Gabriel Retta; 1,187 (12.48%)	Martin Bergeron; 1,343 (14.12%)	Peter McQueen; 3,639 (38.26%)	Marie-Claude Johnson; Co-candidate for Mélanie Joly; 2,990 (31.44%)	Anne E. Adams (Ind.); 352 (3.7%)	Peter McQueen	PM hold
Snowdon	19,431	City councillor	35.16%	Ginette; Sauvé-Frankel; 1,280 (19.55%)	Marvin Rotrand; 3,155 (48.20%)	Sarah Gutman; 2,111 (32.25%)			Marvin Rotrand	CM hold

=== L'Île-Bizard–Sainte-Geneviève ===
Electoral District	Eligible voters	Position	Turnout	Candidates					Incumbent	Result
Electoral District	Eligible voters	Position	Turnout	Équipe Coderre	Projet Montréal	Équipe Bélanger	VCM	Independent	Incumbent	Result
—	13,432	Borough mayor	51.56%	Geoffrey Gordon Arscott; 1,202 (17.72%)	Bruno Grenier; 423 (6.23%)	Richard Bélanger; 2,304 (33.96%)	Normand Marinacci; 2,856 (42.09%)		Richard Bélanger	VCM gain from ERB
Denis-Benjamin-Viger	3,827	Borough councillor	55.60%	Steven Moran; 369 (17.71%)	Marie-Andrée Gelly; 135 (6.48%)	Christopher Little; 534 (25.62%)	Christian Larocque; 1,046 (50.19%)		Christopher Little	VCM gain from ERB
Jacques-Bizard	3,222	Borough councillor	51.40%	Daniel Brouillard; 394 (24.38%)	Angèle Richer; 107 (6.62%)	François Robert; 391 (24.20%)	Jean-Dominic Lévesque-René; 501 (31.00%)	Claude Theoret; 223 (13.80%)	François Robert	VCM gain from ERB
Pierre-Foretier	3,914	Borough councillor	56.08%	Louise Gauthier; 408 (18.94%)	Éric Fournier; 132 (6.13%)	Diane Gibb; 564 (26.18%)	Stéphane Côté; 977 (45.36%)	Claude Limoges; 73 (3.39%)	Diane Gibb	VCM gain from ERB
Sainte-Geneviève	2,469	Borough councillor	38.40%	Roger Leclerc; 169 (18.55%)	Geneviève-Anaïs Proulx; 63 (6.92%)	Éric Dugas; 335 (36.77%)	Jean Maxime Dugat; 240 (26.34%)	Philippe Voisard; 104 (11.42%)	Éric Dugas	ERB hold

=== Lachine ===
Electoral District	Eligible voters	Position	Turnout	Candidates					Incumbent	Result
Electoral District	Eligible voters	Position	Turnout	Équipe Coderre	Coalition	Projet Montréal	Équipe Dauphin	Other	Incumbent	Result
—	31,399	Borough mayor	41.22%			Patricia Bossy; 4,570 (36.52%)	Claude Dauphin; 6,760 (54.03%)	Pierre Ene (Ind.); 1,182 (9.45%)	Claude Dauphin	EDL hold
—	31,399	City councillor	42.60%	Carolina Caruso; 1,587 (12.27%)	Bernard Blanchet; 3,902 (30.18%)	Jean-François Lefebvre; 2,822 (21.83%)	Jean-François Cloutier; 4,165 (32.21%)	Hagop (Jacques) Lakhoyan (Ind.); 453 (3.5%)	Jane; Cowell-Poitras	EDL gain from Ind.
Du Canal	10,744	Borough councillor	38.53%	Sergio Borja; 436 (10.95%)	Lise Poulin; 1,118 (28.09%)	John Symon; 795 (19.97%)	Maja Vodanovic; 1,287 (32.34%)	Julie Langlois (Ind.); 344 (8.64%)	Lise Poulin	EDL gain from CM
Fort-Rolland	10,376	Borough councillor	51.63%	Jean-François Girard; 551 (10.58%)	Mario Durante; 760 (14.59%)	Julie Levasseur; 1,548 (29.72%)	Kymberley Simonyik; 1,618 (31.07%)	Christian Lejeune (Ind.); 478 (9.18%); Pierre Noël (Ind.); 144 (2.76%); Patrick Powell (Ind.); 109 (2.09%)	Jean-François Cloutier	EDL hold
J.-Émery-Provost	10,279	Borough councillor	37.14%		Catherine Ménard; 1,114 (30.47%)	Antonio De Bordes; 818 (22.37%)	Daniel Racicot; 1,151 (31,48%)	Michel Dubois (Ind.); 444 (12.14%); Kevin Guilbault (Ind.); 129 (3.53%)	Bernard Blanchet	EDL gain from CM

=== LaSalle ===
Electoral District	Eligible voters	Position	Turnout	Candidates						Incumbent	Result
Electoral District	Eligible voters	Position	Turnout	Équipe Coderre	Coalition	Projet Montréal	Pro action	VCM	Other	Incumbent	Result
—	51,562	Borough mayor	39.88%	Jean-François Labbé; 4,375 (22.01%)	Oksana Kaluzny; 1,116 (5.61%)	Patrick Asch; 2,235 (11.24%)	Manon Barbe; 7,276 (36.60%)	Francisco Moreno; 3,274 (16.47%)	Michael Vadacchino (LAP); 1,604 (8.07%)	Manon Barbe	PAL hold
Cecil-P.-Newman	25,902	City councillor	36.14%	Monique Vallée; 2,578 (29.05%)	Enrico Pace; 690 (7.78%)	Yosef Azzouni; 1,021 (11.51%)	Luciano Di Sante; 2,443 (27.53%)	Steven Laperrière; 2,019 (22,75%)	Kiril Dolgih (IM); 122 (1.37%)	Alvaro Farinacci	EDC gain from Ind.
Cecil-P.-Newman	25,902	Borough councillor I	36.12%	Anju Dhillon; 2,258 (25.35%)	Mario Orlando; 982 (11.02%)	Mody Maka Barry; 911 (10.23%)	Serge Declos; 2,326 (26.11%)	Eric Tremblay; 1,900 (21.33%)	Raymond Dufort (LAP); 481 (5.40%); Héné Hayeck (Ind.); 51 (0.57%)	Vincenzo Cesari	PAL gain from Ind.
Cecil-P.-Newman	25,902	Borough councillor II	36.14%	Dino Masanotti; 2,699 (30.51%)	Sanjay Patel; 612 (6.92%)	Amir Khan; 1,067 (12.06%)	Josée Troilo; 2,718 (30.72%)	Artur Adam Urbanowicz; 1,751 (19,79%)		Josée Troilo	PAL hold
Sault-Saint-Louis	25,660	City councillor	43.85%	Carlo D'Ambrosio; 2,441 (22.48%)	Pierre Lussier; 874 (8.05%)	Monika Niedbalski; 1,133 (10.43%)	Richard Deschamps; 3,539 (32.59%)	Michel Benoit; 2,272 (20.92%)	Frank Catalano (LAP); 601 (5.53%)	Richard Deschamps	PAL hold
Sault-Saint-Louis	25,660	Borough councillor I	43.63%	Julien Lafontaine; 2,546 (23.71%)	Jocelyne Bénard; 829 (7.72%)	Patrizia Buffone; 1,213 (11.30%)	Nancy Blanchet; 3,367 (31.36%)	Andréa Kwon; 2,126 (19.80%)	Luciano Sicoli (LAP); 656 (6.11%)	Vacant	PAL gain
Sault-Saint-Louis	25,660	Borough councillor II	43.68%	Daniela Romano; 2,877 (26.78%)	Basile Nakouzi; 706 (6.57%)	Romarick Okou; 1,204 (11.21%)	Laura Palestini; 3,654 (34.01%)	Vas Karkavilas; 2,302 (21.43%)		Laura Palestini	PAL hold

=== Mercier–Hochelaga-Maisonneuve ===
Electoral District	Eligible voters	Position	Turnout	Candidates					Incumbent	Result
Electoral District	Eligible voters	Position	Turnout	Équipe Coderre	Coalition	Projet Montréal	VCM	Other	Incumbent	Result
—	96,729	Borough mayor	45.19%	Daniel Poulin; 10,417 (25.02%)	Réal Ménard; 15,106 (36.29%)	Pierre; Lessard-Blais; 12,937 (31.08%)		Serge Canuel (IM); 3,168 (7.61%)	Réal Ménard	CM hold
Hochelaga	23,755	City councillor	42.01%	Patrick Charbonneau; 1,244 (12.84%)	Laurent Blanchard; 2,739 (28.28%)	Éric Alan Caldwell; 3,408 (35.18%)	Mikael St-Pierre; 2,013 (20.78%)	Nicole Donnelly (Ind.); 282 (2.91%)	Vacant	PM gain
Louis-Riel	22,032	City councillor	46.24%	Karine; Boivin Roy; 3,327 (34.26%)	Lyn Thériault; 2,768 (28.50%)	Michel Bouchard; 2,754 (28.36%)		Sonia Robert (IM); 863 (8.89%)	Lyn Thériault	EDC gain from CM
Maisonneuve–Longue-Pointe	25,059	City councillor	45.74%	Cindy Pinel; 2,435 (22.16%)	Pierre Paquet; 2,214 (20.15%)	Laurence Lavigne Lalonde; 3,462 (31.50%)	Alexandra Karatchevskaya; 2,591 (23.58%)	Yves Racicot (Ind.); 288 (2.62%)	Louise Harel	PM gain from CM
Tétreaultville	25,883	City councillor	46.61%	Richard Celzi; 3,232 (27.67%)	Gaëtan Primeau; 2,269 (19.42%)	Suzie Miron; 3,071 (26.29%)	Jonathan Talla; 2,703 (23.14%)	Marc Tremblay (IM); 407 (3.48%)	Gaëtan Primeau	EDC gain from CM

=== Montréal-Nord ===
Electoral District	Eligible voters	Position	Turnout	Candidates				Incumbent	Result
Electoral District	Eligible voters	Position	Turnout	Équipe Coderre	Coalition	Projet Montréal	Independent	Incumbent	Result
—	52,007	Borough mayor	38.40%	Gilles Deguire; 12,173 (65.02%)	Guy Ryan; 3,902 (20.84%)	Suzanne Boivin; 2,648 (14.14%)		Gilles Deguire	EDC hold
Marie-Clarac	27,391	City councillor	38.96%	Chantal Rossi; 6,292 (63.29%)	Michelle Allaire; 2,123 (21.36%)	Andrea Cohen; 1,526 (15.35%)		Clementina Teti-Tomassi	EDC gain from Ind.
Marie-Clarac	27,391	Borough councillor	38.98%	Monica Ricourt; 6,167 (62.22%)	Jean Roy; 1,799 (18.15%)	David Nelson; 1,502 (15.15%)	Henri-Paul Bernier; 444 (4.48%)	Chantal Rossi	EDC hold
Ovide-Clermont	24,616	City councillor	37.74%	Jean-Marc Gibeau; Co-candidate for Denis Coderre; 6,376 (72.2%)	Claude Fortin; 1,098 (12.43%)	Vladimir Gelin; 905 (10.25%)	Renée-Chantal Belinga; 452 (5.12%)	Jean-Marc Gibeau	EDC hold
Ovide-Clermont	24,616	Borough councillor	37.73%	Sylvia Lo Bianco; 5,990 (69.44%)	Wilmann Edouard; 1,325 (15.36%)	Claudia Citta; 1,311 (15.20%)		Monica Ricourt	EDC hold

=== Outremont ===
Electoral District	Eligible voters	Position	Turnout	Candidates					Incumbent	Result
Electoral District	Eligible voters	Position	Turnout	Équipe Coderre	Coalition	Projet Montréal	ECO	Independent	Incumbent	Result
—	15,366	Borough mayor	60.65%	Renaud Tilquin; 900 (9.81%)	Paul-André Tétreault; 1,250 (13.63%)	Etienne Coutu; 3,192 (34.81%)	Marie Cinq-Mars; 3,582 (39.06%)	Comlan Amouzou; 246 (2.68%)	Marie Cinq-Mars	ECO hold
Claude-Ryan	4,024	Borough councillor	61.28%	Sheldon Goldberg; 381 (15.61%)	Paul-Guy Duhamel; 163 (6.68%)	Mindy Pollak; 860 (35.25%)	Charles Prévost; 344 (14.10%)	Pierre Lacerte; 692 (28.36%)	Louis Moffatt	PM gain from Ind.
Jeanne-Sauvé	3,750	Borough councillor	61.52%	Ana Nunes; 395 (17.57%)	Marc-Nicolas Kobrynsky; 356 (15.84%)	Jérôme Bugel; 627 (27.89%)	Jacqueline Gremaud; 870 (38.70%)		Ana Nunes	ECO gain from EDC
Joseph-Beaubien	4,161	Borough councillor	62.15%	Belgacem Rahmani; 131 (5.16%)	Hubert Gallet; 198 (7.80%)	Philipe Tomlinson; 861 (33.90%)	Bertrand Nepveu; 478 (18.82%)	Céline Forget; 872 (34.33%)	Céline Forget	Ind. hold
Robert-Bourassa	3,431	Borough councillor	57.45%	Valérie Lapointe; 258 (13.39%)	Marie Potvin; 541 (28.07%)	Alexa Leblanc; 405 (21.02%)	Lucie Cardyn; 723 (37.52%)		Marie Potvin	ECO gain from CM

=== Pierrefonds-Roxboro ===
Electoral District	Eligible voters	Position	Turnout	Candidates					Incumbent	Result
Electoral District	Eligible voters	Position	Turnout	Équipe Coderre	Coalition	Projet Montréal	VCM	Other	Incumbent	Result
—	46,492	Borough mayor	34.80%	Dimitrios (Jim) Beis; 5,276 (33.45%)	Christian G. Dubois; 2,138 (13.56%)	Michael Labelle; 3,638 (23.07%)	Karim Metwalli; 4,719 (29.92%)		Monique Worth	EDC gain from Ind.
Bois-de-Liesse	24,446	City councillor	35.94%	Jean Raymond; 2,367 (27.72%)	Suzanne Marceau; 1,270 (14.87%)	Sameer Zuberi; 1,958 (22.93%)	Justine McIntyre; 2,943 (34.47%)		Christian G. Dubois	VCM gain from CM
Bois-de-Liesse	24,446	Borough councillor	35.95%	Claudine Campeau; 2,375 (27.92%)	David-James Smith; 1,113 (13.08%)	Nathalie Morin; 2,050 (24.10%)	Roger Trottier; 2,523 (29.66%)	Ross Stitt (Ind.); 263 (3.09%); Jean Charles Legault (Ind.); 183 (2.15%)	Dimitrios (Jim) Beis	VCM gain from EDC
Cap-Saint-Jacques	22,046	City councillor	33.52%	Catherine Clément-Talbot; 3,309 (47.56%)	Linton Garner; 1,502 (21.59%)	Eric McCarty; 2,147 (30.86%)			Bertrand A. Ward	EDC gain from Ind.
Cap-Saint-Jacques	22,046	Borough councillor	33.55%	Yves Gignac; 2,624 (36.37%)	Odette Maltais; 914 (12.67%)	Lisa Sirignano; 1,535 (21.28%)	Bhaskar Goswami; 2,142 (29.69%)		Catherine Clément-Talbot	EDC hold

=== Le Plateau-Mont-Royal ===
Electoral District	Eligible voters	Position	Turnout	Candidates					Incumbent	Result
Electoral District	Eligible voters	Position	Turnout	Équipe Coderre	Coalition	Projet Montréal	Intégrité Montréal	Other	Incumbent	Result
—	65,058	Borough mayor	51.52%	Gilbert Thibodeau; 4,437 (13.62%)	Danièle Lorain; 10,007 (30.72%)	Luc Ferrandez; 16,706 (51.28%)		Martin Boyer (Ind.); 1,429 (4.39%)	Luc Ferrandez	PM hold
DeLorimier	23,148	City councillor	57.54%	Carmelle Marchessault; 1,749 (13.57%)	Suzanne Craig; 3,188 (24.73%)	Louise Mainville; 6,661 (51.67%)	Crystal Racine; Co-candidate for Michel Brûlé; 695 (5.39%)	Simon Lacombe (Ind.); 386 (2.99%); Pierre Cousineau (Ind.); 212 (1.64%); ~~Bibiane Bovet (VCM)~~; Candidacy withdrawn	Josée Duplessis	PM hold
DeLorimier	23,148	Borough councillor	57.54%	Nam Truong; 1,586 (12.29%)	Carl Boileau; 3,587 (27.80%)	Marianne Giguère; 6,771 (52.47%)		Sophie Stéphanie Lapierre (Ind.); 960 (7.44%)	Carl Boileau	PM gain from CM
Jeanne-Mance	20,584	City councillor	45.18%	Eleni Fakotakis-Kolaitis; 1,453 (16.13%)	Piper Huggins; 2,434 (27.02%)	Alex Norris; 4,252 (47.2%)	Dominique Caron; 518 (5,75%)	Joao Neves (Ind.); 224 (2.49%); Daniel Simon (Ind.); 128 (1.42%)	Richard Bergeron	PM hold
Jeanne-Mance	20,584	Borough councillor	45.50%	Antonio Rodrigues; 1,479 (16.33%)	André Picard; 2,480 (27.38%)	Christine Gosselin; 4,432 (48.93%)	Manon Bisaillon; 667 (7.36%)		Piper Huggins	PM gain from CM
Mile End	21,326	City councillor	51.02%	Alain Clavet; 1,587 (15.12%)	Galia Vaillancourt; 2,000 (19.05%)	Richard Ryan; 6,126 (58.35%)	Isabelle Tremblay; 785 (7.48%)		Alex Norris	PM hold
Mile End	21,326	Borough councillor	51.03%	Sandenga Yeba; 1,168 (11.02%)	Stéphanie Grondin; 1,609 (15.18%)	Marie Plourde; 5,447 (51.40%)	Joaquin; Olivo Rodriguez; 257 (2.43%)	David Côté (VCM); 2,116 (19.97%)	Richard Ryan	PM hold

=== Rivière-des-Prairies–Pointe-aux-Trembles ===
Electoral District	Eligible voters	Position	Turnout	Candidates					Incumbent	Result
Electoral District	Eligible voters	Position	Turnout	Équipe Coderre	Coalition	Projet Montréal	VCM	Independent	Incumbent	Result
—	78,909	Borough mayor	42.51%	Chantal Rouleau; 20,755 (65.94%)	Michel Taylor; 4,963 (15.77%)	Romeo Della Valle; 5,759 (18.30%)			Chantal Rouleau	EDC hold
La Pointe-aux-Prairies	29,639	City councillor	42.08%	Richard Guay; 5,922 (50.86%)	Caroline Bourgeois; 3,326 (28.56%)	Paul Therrien; 2,396 (20.58%)			Caroline Bourgeois	EDC gain from CM
La Pointe-aux-Prairies	29,639	Borough councillor	42.15%	Manuel Guedes; 5,215 (43.38%)	Mario Blanchet; 1,941 (16.15%)	Tomy-Richard Leboeuf McGregor; 1,762 (14.66%)	Gaëtan Bérard; 3,104 (25.82%)		Mario Blanchet	EDC gain from CM
Pointe-aux-Trembles	24,469	City councillor	46.95%	Suzanne Décarie; 5,902 (54.43%)	Cindy Leclerc; 2,046 (18.87%)	Hugues Surprenant; 2,288 (21.10%)		Yan Théoret; 608 (5.61%)	Suzanne Décarie	EDC hold
Pointe-aux-Trembles	24,469	Borough councillor	46.90%	Gilles Déziel; 5,219 (48.48%)	Emmanuelle Perrier; 2,155 (20.02%)	Audrey Beauséjour; 2,659 (24.70%)		Gérald Briand; 733 (6.81%)	Gilles Déziel	EDC hold
Rivière-des-Prairies	24,801	City councillor	38.58%	Giovanni Rapanà; 6,046 (67.73%)	Italo Barone; 1,394 (15.62%)	Jeffrey Scott Latchman; 1,486 (16.65%)			Cindy Leclerc	EDC gain from CM
Rivière-des-Prairies	24,801	Borough councillor	38.59%	Nathalie Pierre-Antoine; 5,281 (58.39%)	Danny Caruso; 1,101 (12.17%)	Steven Hombrados; 891 (9.85%)	Gianni Chiazzese; 1,597 (17.66%)	Marcel Firmin; 175 (1.93%)	Giovanni Rapanà	EDC hold

=== Rosemont–La Petite-Patrie ===
Electoral District	Eligible voters	Position	Turnout	Candidates					Incumbent	Result
Electoral District	Eligible voters	Position	Turnout	Équipe Coderre	Coalition	Projet Montréal	VCM	Intégrité Montréal	Incumbent	Result
—	96,442	Borough mayor	52.00%	Josselin Breton; 10,522 (21.80%)	Simon Jolivet; 6,409 (13.28%)	François Croteau; 28,698 (59.47%)		Jean Saint-Louis; 2,626 (5.44%)	François Croteau	PM hold
Étienne-Desmarteau	23,339	City councillor	54.87%	Jacques Monette; 2,038 (16.34%)	Chantal L'Heureux; 1,382 (11.08%)	Marc-André Gadoury; 6,800 (54.51%)	Delphine Velasco; 2,012 (16.13%)	Ekaterina Semikin; 243 (1.95%)	Marc-André Gadoury	PM hold
Marie-Victorin	22,731	City councillor	50.41%	Françoise Stanton; 3,770 (34.50%)	Jean Therrien; 2,416 (22.11%)	Guillaume Lavoie; 4,740 (43.38%)			Élaine Ayotte	PM gain from Ind.
Saint-Édouard	25,084	City councillor	51.13%	Michel Da Ponte; 1,723 (13.74%)	Zhao Xin Wu; 1,089 (8.69%)	François Limoges; 7,582 (60.48%)	Marie-Thérèse Aïssi; 2,142 (17.09%)		François Limoges	PM hold
Vieux-Rosemont	25,288	City councillor	51.53%	Maximilien May; 2,325 (18.33%)	Yvan Girardin; 1,398 (11.02%)	Érika Duchesne; 5,938 (46.83%)	Pascal Boisgibault; 2,673 (21.08%)	Martin Papineau; 347 (2.74%)	Érika Duchesne	PM hold

=== Saint-Laurent ===
Electoral District	Eligible voters	Position	Turnout	Candidates					Incumbent	Result
Electoral District	Eligible voters	Position	Turnout	Équipe Coderre	Coalition	Projet Montréal	VCM	Independent	Incumbent	Result
—	58,554	Borough mayor	35.82%	Alan DeSousa; 10,887 (53.52%)	Marcello Barsalou; 1,374 (6.75%)	William Fayad; 2,255 (11.09%)	François Ghali; 5,825 (28.64%)		Alan DeSousa	EDC hold
Côte-de-Liesse	30,970	City councillor	35.40%	Francesco Miele; 4,561 (43.11%)	Frances Gorzalka; 860 (8.13%)	Corinne Minier; 1,366 (12.91%)	Eyal Albert Cohen; 3,793 (35.85%)		Francesco Miele	EDC hold
Côte-de-Liesse	30,970	Borough councillor	35.70%	Maurice Cohen; 4,881 (45.63%)	Sara Farah; 1,042 (9.74%)	Dominique Bastien; 1,383 (12.93%)	Michael Siegman; 3,226 (30.16%)	Viorel Ivascu; 166 (1.55%)	Maurice Cohen	EDC hold
Norman-McLaren	27,584	City councillor	36.03%	Aref Salem; 4,309 (45.32%)	Mubashar Rasool; 834 (8.77%)	Naïri Khandjian; 1,374 (14.45%)	Mélanie Tannous; 2,991 (31.46%)		Aref Salem	EDC hold
Norman-McLaren	27,584	Borough councillor	36.03%	Michèle D. Biron; 4,654 (48.93%)	Elias Bitar; 1,089 (11.45%)	Wael Hraiky; 1,315 (13.82%)	Stefan Ionescu; 2,454 (25.80%)		Michèle D. Biron	EDC hold

=== Saint-Léonard ===
Electoral District	Eligible voters	Position	Turnout	Candidates					Incumbent	Result
Electoral District	Eligible voters	Position	Turnout	Équipe Coderre	Coalition	Projet Montréal	VCM	Other	Incumbent	Result
—	48,112	Borough mayor	37.33%	Michel Bissonnet; 10,938 (65.69%)	Dominic Talarico; 2,282 (13.70%)	Cyrille Giraud; 2,336 (14.03%)		Sabrina D'Avirro (IM); 1,096 (6.58%)	Michel Bissonnet	EDC hold
Saint-Léonard-Est	20,982	City councillor	37.63%	~~Robert Zambito~~; Candidacy withdrawn	Domenico Moschella; 2,468 (50.82%)	Roberta Peressini; 2,388 (49.18%)			Robert Zambito	CM gain from EDC
Saint-Léonard-Est	20,982	Borough councillor	37.63%	Lili-Anne Tremblay; 3,490 (48.89%)	Giuseppe (Joe) Mormina; 923 (12.93%)	Nathan Dratler; 804 (11.26%)	Tommaso Di Paola; 1,732 (24.26%)	Yassir Madih (Ind.); 190 (2.66%)	Lili-Anne Tremblay	EDC hold
Saint-Léonard-Ouest	27,130	City councillor	37.11%	Dominic Perri; 6,241 (67.76%)	Sonya Mullins; 1,334 (14.48%)	Edna Constant; 1,635 (17.75%)			Dominic Perri	EDC hold
Saint-Léonard-Ouest	27,130	Borough councillor	37.10%	Mario Battista; 6,149 (66.71%)	Orlando Panetta; 1,335 (14.48%)	Teresa Taraborrelli; 1,734 (18.81%)			Mario Battista	EDC hold

=== Le Sud-Ouest ===
Electoral District	Eligible voters	Position	Turnout	Candidates					Incumbent	Result
Electoral District	Eligible voters	Position	Turnout	Équipe Coderre	Coalition	Projet Montréal	VCM	Intégrité Montréal	Incumbent	Result
—	51,114	Borough mayor	39.73%	Sylvia M. Rivès; 4,110 (20.95%)	Benoit Dorais; 5,402 (27.53%)	Jason Prince; 5,287 (26.95%)	Cindy Filiatrault; 4,822 (24.58%)		Benoit Dorais	CM hold
Saint-Henri–Petite-Bourgogne–Pointe-Saint-Charles	29,736	City councillor	39.12%	Derek Robertson; 2,224 (19.69%)	Véronique Fournier; 2,905 (25.71%)	Craig Sauvé; 3,309 (29.29%)	Mudi Wa Mbuji Liévin Kabeya; 2,589 (22.92%)	Patrice-Hans Perrier; 270 (2.39%)	Véronique Fournier	PM gain from CM
Saint-Henri–Petite-Bourgogne–Pointe-Saint-Charles	29,736	Borough councillor	39.07%	Pierre Fréchette; 2,796 (25.51%)	Kristi de Bonville; 3,067 (27.98%)	Sophie Thiébaut; 5,099 (46.52%)			Sophie Thiébaut	PM hold
Saint-Paul–Émard	21,378	City councillor	40.68%	Claudia Olga Ouamabia; 2,506 (31.04%)	Huguette Roy; 2,139 (26.50%)	Anne-Marie Sigouin; 2,997 (37.12%)		José Humberto Salas Castro; 431 (5.34%)	Daniel Bélanger	PM gain from CM
Saint-Paul–Émard	21,378	Borough councillor	40.68%	Guillaume Phaneuf; 2,617 (32.61%)	Daniel Bélanger; 2,461 (30.66%)	Alain Vaillancourt; 2,948 (36.73%)			Huguette Roy	PM gain from CM

=== Verdun ===
Electoral District	Eligible voters	Position	Turnout	Candidates						Incumbent	Result
Electoral District	Eligible voters	Position	Turnout	Équipe Coderre	Coalition	Projet Montréal	OVM	VCM	Other	Incumbent	Result
—	47,677	Borough mayor	44.74%	Jean-François Parenteau; 5,147 (24.81%)	Alain Tassé; 2,902 (13.99%)	Mary Ann Davis; 4,594 (22.14%)	André Savard; 2,669 (12.86%)	Mourad Bendjennet; 3,645 (17.57%)	Andrée Champoux (EAC); 1,549 (7.47%) Jency Mercier (IM); 139 (0.67%) Katherine Le Rougetel (Ind.); 102 (0.49%)	Ginette Marotte	EDC gain from Ind.
Champlain –L'Île-des-Sœurs	25,660	City councillor	45.60%	Manon Gauthier; 2,972 (26.25%)	André Julien; 1,612 (14.24%)	Jack L. Kugelmass; 2,195 (19.39%)	Marc Touchette; 833 (7.36%)	Mathieu Bélanger; 2,643 (23.34%)	Jacques Gendron (EAC); 1,067 (9.42%)	Vacant	EDC gain
Champlain –L'Île-des-Sœurs	25,660	Borough councillor I	45.64%	Pierre L'Heureux; 3,051 (26.9%)	Paul Beaupré; 1,782 (15.71%)	Dolores Durbau; 2,149 (18.95%)	Charles Côté; 984 (8.68%)	Jacline Leroux; 2,514 (22.17%)	Carole Anctil (EAC); 752 (6.63%); Abdulilah Kassem (Ind.); 109 (0.96%)	Paul Beaupré	EDC gain from CM
Champlain –L'Île-des-Sœurs	25,660	Borough councillor II	45.68%	Marie-Eve Brunet; 3,051 (26.88%)	Jean-Pierre Boivin; 1,886 (16.62%)	Stefana Lamasanu; 2,313 (20.36%)	Luce Latendresse; 800 (7.05%)	Stéphanie Raymond-Bougie; 2,617 (23.06%)	Béatrice Guay Pepper (EAC); 684 (6.03%)	Andrée Champoux	EDC gain from EAC
Desmarchais-Crawford	22,017	City councillor	43.68%	Sébastien Dhavernas; 2,095 (22.53%)	Françoise Gloutnay; 1,082 (11.64%)	Sterling Downey; 2,306 (24.80%)	Richard Langlais; 1,523 (16.38%)	Marie-Josée Parent; 1,917 (20.62%)	France Caya (EAC); 376 (4.04%)	Alain Tassé	PM gain from CM
Desmarchais-Crawford	22,017	Borough councillor I	43.67%	Michelle Tremblay; 2,141 (23.05%)	Monique Trudel; 1,228 (13.22%)	Luc Gagnon; 2,329 (25.07%)	Joanne Poulin; 1,431 (15.41%)	Gladys Negret; 1,773 (19.09%)	Michèle L'Allier-Davies (EAC); 387 (4.17%)	Ann Guy	PM gain from Ind.
Desmarchais-Crawford	22,017	Borough councillor II	43.67%	Philippe Sarrasin; 2,018 (21.71%)	Rielle Lévesque; 1,060 (11.40%)	Marie-Andrée Mauger; 2,422 (26.05%)	Robert Auger; 1,510 (16.24%)	André-Yanne Parent; 1,878 (20.20%)	Mamad Raheemeea (EAC); 409 (4.40%)	André Savard	PM gain from OVM

=== Ville-Marie ===
Electoral District	Eligible voters	Position	Turnout	Candidates					Incumbent	Result
Electoral District	Eligible voters	Position	Turnout	Équipe Coderre	Coalition	Projet Montréal	VCM	Other	Incumbent	Result
Peter-McGill	17,243	City councillor	29.54%	Damien Silès; 1,366 (27.44%)	Nicole Trudeau; 962 (19.32%)	Jimmy Zoubris; 786 (15.79%)	Steve Shanahan; 1,865 (37.46%)		Sammy Forcillo	VCM gain from Ind.
Saint-Jacques	19,487	City councillor	41.10%	Philippe Schnobb; 2,247 (28.62%)	François Robillard; 1,307 (16.65%)	Janine Krieber; Co-candidate for Richard Bergeron; 2,283 (29.08%)	Francis Salvadori; 1,707 (21.74%)	Jade Wang (IM); 149 (1.90%); Stéphane Deschamps (Ind.); 104 (1.32%); Nelson Dias (Ind.); 54 (0.69%)	François Robillard	PM gain from CM
Sainte-Marie	17,678	City councillor	44.54%	Pierre Paiement; 898 (11.71%)	Louise Harel; 2,263 (29.52%)	Valérie Plante; 2,526 (32.95%)		Pierre Mainville (Ind.); 1,626 (21.21%); Anne-Marie Gélinas (IM); 354 (4.62%)	Pierre Mainville	PM gain from Ind.

=== Villeray–Saint-Michel–Parc-Extension ===
Electoral District	Eligible voters	Position	Turnout	Candidates					Incumbent	Result
Electoral District	Eligible voters	Position	Turnout	Équipe Coderre	Coalition	Projet Montréal	VCM	Other	Incumbent	Result
—	86,454	Borough mayor	42.08%	Anie Samson; 12,395 (35.61%)	Soraya Martinez; 5,447 (15.65%)	Nathalie Goulet; 11,665 (33.52%)	Béatrice Zako; 5,296 (15.22%)		Anie Samson	EDC hold
François-Perrault	21,822	City councillor	41.30%	Claude Bricault; 2,799 (32.54%)	Nino Colavecchio; 929 (10.80%)	Sylvain Ouellet; 2,822 (32.80%)	Angelo De Cicco; 1,737 (20.19%)	François; St-Louis (IM); 197 (2.29%); André-Germain Lessard (Ind.); 119 (1.38%)	Frank Venneri	PM gain from Ind.
Parc-Extension	19,585	City councillor	37.46%	Mary Deros; 3,105 (44.57%)	Stella Anastasakis; 924 (13.26%)	Sasha Dyck; 1,938 (27.82%)	Dilbagh Singh; 1,000 (14.35%)		Mary Deros	EDC hold
Saint-Michel	21,255	City councillor	33.47%	Frantz Benjamin; 3,390 (50.24%)	John De Luca; 958 (14.20%)	Isabelle Bernard; 1,270 (18.82%)	Emilio; Alvarez Garcia; 1,129 (16.73%)		Frantz Benjamin	EDC hold
Villeray	23,792	City councillor	54.20%	Pasquale Lino Iacobacci; 1,700 (13.63%)	Elsie Lefebvre; 5,691 (45.64%)	Robert Prévost; 4,604 (36.93%)		Ludovic Aubut-Lussier (Ind.); 473 (3.79%)	Elsie Lefebvre	CM hold
