= Marianne Giguère =

Politician

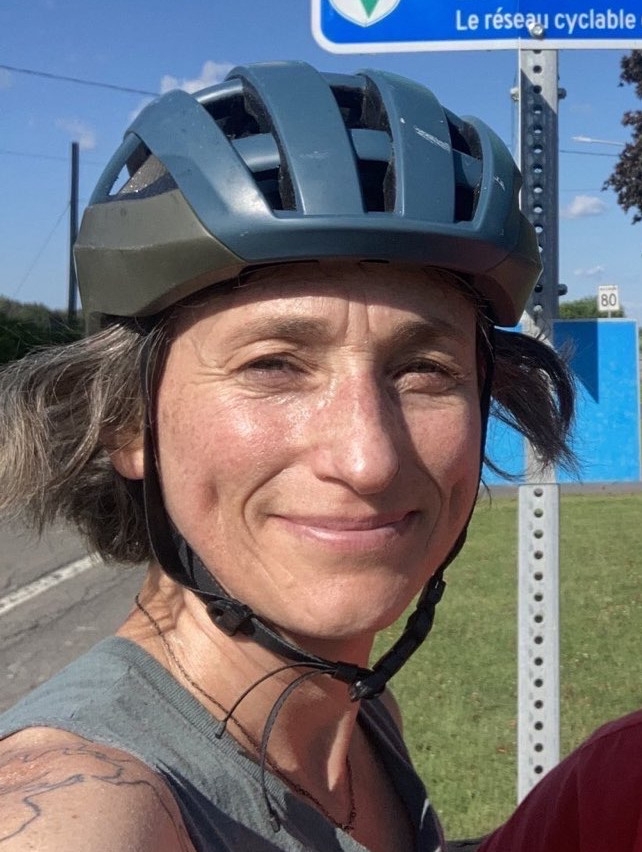
- Marianne Giguère in 2025

Associate councillor on the Montreal Executive Committee with responsibility for sustainable development and active transit
- In office 2017–2025
- Preceded by: position created

Montreal City Councillor for De Lorimier
- In office 2017–2025
- Preceded by: Louise Mainville
- Succeeded by: Maeva Vilain

Plateau-Mont-Royal Borough Councillor for De Lorimier
- In office 2013–2017
- Preceded by: Carl Boileau
- Succeeded by: Josefina Blanco

Personal details
- Party: Projet Montréal

Marianne Giguère is a politician in Montreal, Quebec, Canada. She served on the Plateau-Mont-Royal borough council from 2013 to 2025 and on the Montreal city council from 2017 to 2025 as a member of Projet Montréal. In November 2017, she was appointed as an associate member of new mayor Valérie Plante's Montreal executive committee (i.e., the municipal cabinet).

== Private career ==
Giguère was an educational consultant before entering political life. She is also a singer and percussionist. Her campaign literature indicates that she joined Projet Montréal at the time of the party's founding in 2004.

== Borough councillor ==
Giguère was elected to the Plateau-Mont-Royal borough council in the 2013 Montreal municipal election, defeating incumbent councillor Carl Boileau in the De Lorimier ward. Projet Montréal emerged as the official opposition on city council after the election and won every seat in Plateau-Mont-Royal to continue as the local governing authority in the borough. In January 2014, Giguère was appointed as her party's critic on urban agriculture, cycling, and green spaces.

On the day following her appointment, she urged the city to develop a plan to confront the presence of the emerald ash borer beetle in the city's parks and woodlands. She also called for the city to improve access to public beaches, and she supported the Plateau-Mont-Royal council's decision to limit one-hour free parking spots for shoppers in a bid to decrease car traffic in the area.

=== Cycling issues ===
Giguère's primary area of focus during her first term was cycling and cyclist safety. She approved of the Montreal executive committee's decision to purchase the local assets of the bicycle sharing system Bixi in February 2014 after the company filed for bankruptcy, though she argued that the service should be taken over by the Société de transport de Montréal in the longer term. She also called on the government of Quebec to modernize its highway safety code in April of the same year, saying that the existing code did not reflect the increased presence of urban cycling. In September 2014, she urged the city to prioritize bike lanes on busy, arterial streets rather than in comparatively safe residential areas.

In early 2015, the city opened a new bike lane on Saint Laurent Boulevard that met with a negative response from cyclists due to the absence of lane markings, a trajectory that some described as dangerous, and the fact that it ended with no obvious path for cyclists on which cyclists could continue. Giguère joined in the criticism, remarking, "It takes people who don't understand bicycles to design something like that. It makes no sense." She did, however, support the city government's decision to dedicate a bike path on Saint Denis Street later in the year, and she supported the city's twelve-point set of recommendations to reform the provincial highway safety code for the benefit of cyclists.

Giguère argued in 2016 that the interests of cyclists were often ignored in Montreal's urban renovation projects. "We're really stagnating in terms of new dedicated paths that will bring out new cyclists," she said Marianne Giguère. "We have the idea that they're adding a few kilometres year after year, but there's no great vision." In the same year, she presented a workshop on Projet Montréal's efforts to improve cyclist and pedestrian safety at the Pro Walk/Pro Bike/Pro Place conference in Vancouver.

== City councillor ==
Giguère was elected for the De Lorimier city ward in the 2017 Montreal municipal election, in which Projet Montréal won the mayoralty, a majority of seats of the Montreal city council, and, once again, every seat on the Plateau-Mont-Royal borough council. Following the election, she was appointed as an associate member of the Montreal executive committee with responsibility for sustainable development and active transit. She works with executive councillors Luc Ferrandez and Jean-François Parenteau on the first of these files and with executive councillor Éric Alan Caldwell on the second.

By virtue of holding her seat on city council, Giguère continues to serve on the Plateau-Mont-Royal borough council.

== Electoral record ==
2017 Montreal municipal election: Councillor, De Lorimier
Party	Candidate	Votes	%	±%
Projet Montréal	Marianne Giguère	8,415	70.84	
Équipe Denis Coderre	Linda Gauthier	3,464	29.16	
Total valid votes		11,879	100	
Total rejected ballots		275		
Turnout		12,154	52.42	
Electors on the lists		23,188		
Source: Election results, 2017, City of Montreal.

2013 Montreal municipal election: Borough councillor, De Lorimier
Party	Candidate	Votes	%	±%
Projet Montréal	Marianne Giguère	6,771	52.47	+4.35
Coalition Montréal	Carl Boileau (incumbent)	3,587	27.80	-10.46
Équipe Denis Coderre	Nam Truong	1,586	12.29	
Independent	Sophie Stéphanie Lapierre	960	7.44	
Total valid votes		12,904	100	
Total rejected ballots		416		
Turnout		13,320	57.54	
Electors on the lists		23,148		
Source: Election results, 2013, City of Montreal.
