= Plateau-Mont-Royal borough council =

The Plateau-Mont-Royal borough council is the local governing body of Le Plateau-Mont-Royal, a borough in the City of Montreal. The council consists of seven members: the borough mayor (who also serves as a Montreal city councillor), city council representatives for each of the borough's three electoral districts, and borough council representatives for the same three districts.

The borough is a stronghold of support for Projet Montréal.

== Members in the current term (2017-2021) ==
District	Position	Name	Party
—	Borough mayor City councillor	Luc Ferrandez	Projet Montréal
De Lorimier	City councillor	Marianne Giguère	Projet Montréal
De Lorimier	Borough councillor	Josefina Blanco	Projet Montréal
Jeanne-Mance	City councillor	Alex Norris	Projet Montréal
Jeanne-Mance	Borough councillor	Maeva Vilain	Projet Montréal
Mile-End	City councillor	Richard Ryan	Projet Montréal
Mile-End	Borough councillor	Marie Plourde	Projet Montréal

== Members in previous terms ==
=== 2013–17 ===
District	Position	Name	Party
—	Borough mayor City councillor	Luc Ferrandez	Projet Montréal
De Lorimier	City councillor	Louise Mainville	Projet Montréal
De Lorimier	Borough councillor	Marianne Giguère	Projet Montréal
Jeanne-Mance	City councillor	Alex Norris	Projet Montréal
Jeanne-Mance	Borough councillor	Christine Gosselin	Projet Montréal
Mile-End	City councillor	Richard Ryan	Projet Montréal
Mile-End	Borough councillor	Marie Plourde	Projet Montréal

=== 2009–13 ===
District	Position	Name	Party
—	Borough mayor City councillor	Luc Ferrandez	Projet Montréal
De Lorimier	City councillor	Josée Duplessis	Projet Montréal
De Lorimier	Borough councillor	Carl Boileau	Projet Montréal (2009–12)
De Lorimier	Borough councillor	Carl Boileau	Independent (2012–13)
De Lorimier	Borough councillor	Carl Boileau	Vision Montreal (2013)
Jeanne-Mance	City councillor	Richard Bergeron	Projet Montréal
Jeanne-Mance	Borough councillor	Piper Huggins	Projet Montréal (2009–13)
Jeanne-Mance	Borough councillor	Piper Huggins	Independent (2013)
Mile-End	City councillor	Alex Norris	Projet Montréal
Mile-End	Borough councillor	Richard Ryan	Projet Montréal

=== 2005–09 ===
District	Position	Name	Party
—	Borough mayor City councillor	Helen Fotopulos	Citizens Union
De Lorimier	City councillor	Richard Bergeron	Projet Montréal
De Lorimier	Borough councillor	Josée Duplessis	Projet Montréal
Jeanne-Mance	City councillor	Michel Prescott	Citizens Union
Jeanne-Mance	Borough councillor	Isabel Dos Santos	Citizens Union
Mile-End	City councillor	Michel Labrecque	Citizens Union
Mile-End	Borough councillor	Eleni Fakotakis-Kolaitis	Citizens Union

Note: The Montreal Island Citizens Union was renamed as Union Montreal in 2007.

=== 2002–05 ===
District	Position	Name	Party
Jeanne-Mance	City councillor	Michel Prescott	Citizens Union
Laurier	City councillor	Christine Poulin	Vision Montreal
Mile-End	City councillor	Helen Fotopoulos	Citizens Union
Plateau-Mont-Royal	City councillor	Nicolas Tétrault	Vision Montreal (2002–04)
Plateau-Mont-Royal	City councillor	Nicolas Tétrault	Independent (2004)
Plateau-Mont-Royal	City councillor	Nicolas Tétrault	Citizens Union (2004–05)
