= Plourde =

Plourde is a surname. Notable people with the surname include:

- André Plourde (born 1937), Canadian politician
- Derrick Plourde (1971– 2005), American drummer
- Joseph-Aurèle Plourde (1915–2013), Canadian Roman Catholic archbishop
- Lucien Plourde (born 1930), Canadian politician
- Marie Plourde (born 1966), Canadian politician
- Tony Plourde (born 1966), Canadian fencer
- Peter Plourde (born 1977), American rapper (Professor Lyrical) and University Professor
