= Christine Poulin =

Canadian politician

Christine Poulin is a politician in Montreal, Quebec, Canada. She served on the Montreal city council from 2001 to 2005 as a member of Vision Montreal (VM).

== City councillor ==
She was elected to council in the 2001 municipal election for the Laurier division, defeating incumbent candidate Richard Théorêt of the Montreal Island Citizens Union (MICU). MICU won a council majority in this election, and Poulin served as a member of the official opposition with Vision Montréal with former mayor of Montreal Pierre Bourque.

In 2001 municipal election was the first to be held in Montreal after the city's amalgamation with neighbouring suburbs. In 2002, Poulin accused Montreal mayor Gérald Tremblay of failing to decentralize administrative services in the city's pre-amalgamation borders.

She was the president of the urbanism commission of borough Plateau Mont-Royal, and member of the Commission on corporate business, strategic management, human capital and ethnocultural diversity.

In 2005, Poulin joined with Toronto city councillor Olivia Chow and Calgary city councillor Ric McIver to take part in Xerox Canada's "Colour for Charity" campaign. The three councillors were publicly painted a variety of vibrant colours, in return for receiving a combined ten thousand dollars to donate to a charity of their choice.

By virtue of her position on city council, Poulin also served on the Plateau-Mont-Royal borough council. She ran in the De Lorimier ward in the 2005 and was defeated by Projet Montréal candidate Carl Boileau who give is place to Richard Bergeron.

She participated in a mission to observe the elections in Ukraine in 2012 and 2019.

Christine Poulin is regulated immigration consultant, member of ICCRC, board regulation of immigration consultants in Canada, since 2013. She owns Immigration Elite Inc. She is active in CAPIC-ACCPI, the canadian professional association of immigration consultant like VP Quebec.

She holds a BA in Political Science from Laval University, a Certificate in International Business of HEC in Montreal, a master's in international management from ENAP. She finished a certificate in law from Université of Montreal.

President of the association BPW Montreal, a chapter of Business professional women international, this chapter was created since 1926. Also she participated at the creation of an association of former Québec municipal councillors in 2019.

== Electoral record ==
2005 Montreal municipal election: Councillor, De Lorimier
Party	Candidate	Votes	%
Projet Montréal	Carl Boileau co-listed with Richard Bergeron	3,078	36.53
Montreal Island Citizens Union	Christine Mitton	2,838	33.69
Vision Montreal	Christine Poulin (incumbent)	2,509	29.78
Total valid votes		8,425	100
Source: City of Montreal official results (in French), City of Montreal.

2001 Montreal municipal election: Councillor, Laurier
Party	Candidate	Votes	%
Vision Montreal	Christine Poulin	4,636	57.45
Montreal Island Citizens Union	Richard Théorêt (incumbent)	2,945	36.50
White Elephant Party	Benoit Mainguy	488	6.05
Total valid votes		8,069	100
Source: Election results, 1833-2005 (in French), City of Montreal.
