= Maja Vodanovic =

Canadian politician

Maja Vodanović
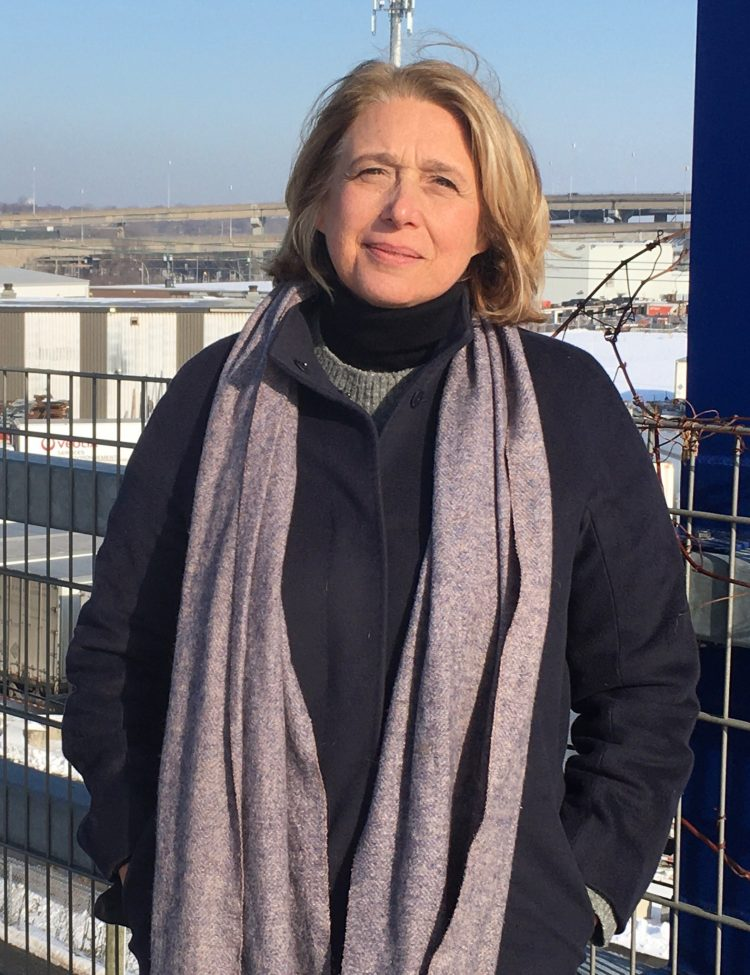

Borough Mayor of Lachine
- Incumbent
- Assumed office November 17, 2017
- Preceded by: Claude Dauphin

Personal details
- Born: January 20, 1968 (age 58) Split, Croatia, Yugoslavia
- Party: Projet Montréal
- Education: McGill University

Maja Vodanović (born January 20, 1968) is a Croatian-Canadian artist, teacher and politician. She was the mayor of the Montreal borough of Lachine between 2017 and 2025.

== Biography ==
Maja Vodanović was born on January 20, 1968, in Split, Croatia, at the time a republic part of Yugoslavia. She emigrated to Canada in 1975. She studied at McGill University where she got a B.A. in Art History in 1991 and at Concordia University where she got a Bachelor of Fine Arts in 1994.

As a painter, she has been represented by Galerie Valentin in Montreal, Galerie Yvon Desgagnés in Baie-Saint-Paul and Gevik Gallery in Toronto.

Between 1984 and 2013, she taught art to children through projects focused on knowledge of the local fauna and flora and on protection of the environment.

Maja Vodanovic is married to architect Bernard Olivier. They have two children, born in 1994 and 1997.

== Politics ==
Through her educational work, she was involved in creating the Alliance Jeunesse de Lachine (Lachine Youth Alliance) for the purpose of increasing the participation of young people in democracy.

Maja Vodanović was elected borough councillor for the Canal District of Lachine in 2013, as candidate for the party of the incumbent mayor, Claude Dauphin.

In 2016, she disagreed with the way urban planning and contaminated soils were managed in the Lachine-Est zone and left the party of Claude Dauphin. In January 2017, she joined Projet Montréal and announced she would be candidate for the position of borough mayor.

In November 2017, Maja Vodanović was elected mayor of the borough of Lachine with 39,57% of the votes. Following the election, she was nominated member of the executive committee of the Communauté métropolitaine de Montréal and representative of the CMM to the National Zero Waste Council of Canada where she sits on the Management Board and is the co-chair of the plastic advisory panel.

At the November 7, 2021 general election, Maja Vodanović was reelected with 62,21 % of the votes. On November 24, she was nominated by the mayor of Montreal to the Executive Committee with responsibility for water and coordination between boroughs and delegate to the Great Lakes and Saint Lawrence Cities Initiative, where she was elected to the 2022-2023 Board of directors.

At the general election of November 2, 2025, she comes second by 11 votes behind the candidate of the Ensemble Montréal party, Julie-Pascale Provost.
