= Iris Almeida-Côté =

Indian administrator

- Born: 1961 (age 64–65); Bombay, India
- Education: University of Bombay (BA, MA); Université du Québec à Montréal (LL.M.)

Iris Almeida-Côté, formerly known as Iris Almeida, is an administrator based in Montreal, Quebec, Canada. She has held leadership positions in several governmental and non-governmental organizations, including the International Centre for Human Rights and Democratic Development (otherwise known as Rights & Democracy) and Canada World Youth.

== Early life and education ==
Almeida-Côté was born in Bombay (now Mumbai), India. She holds a bachelor's degree and a master's degree in sociology from the University of Bombay (1982), served as president of the Mouvement international d'étudiants universitaires in Paris from 1982 to 1986, and was assistant secretary-general for the International Cooperation for Development and Solidarity between 1986 and 1988. She later earned a second master's degree in international law from the Université du Québec à Montréal (UQAM) (2001).

== Administrator ==
=== Rights & Democracy ===
After moving to Canada, Almeida-Côté served as head of programs at Partnership Africa Canada from December 1988 until October 1991, when she became an administrator at Rights & Democracy.

An article in The Globe and Mail from December 1992 described Almeida-Côté as responsible for overseeing Rights & Democracy's programs in Asia and Africa; her duties in this capacity included organizing, monitoring, assessing, and sometimes visiting projects in countries such as Pakistan and Burkina Faso. She noted at this time that the centre's funds for India went to an organization called the Centre of Concern for Child Labour, which, she said, was active in "organizing these kids to take care of themselves" by seeking better health standards and conditions at a time when child labour was still legal in the country. On another occasion, she said, "Ours is not the traditional approach. It's a new way of dialogue with NGOs [non-government organizations] in the South: we can provide some expertise and some funding, but we don't dictate their policy."

In February 1993, Almeida-Côté urged the government of Canada to cut off its seventeen million dollars in annual aid to Rwanda due to the worsening human rights situation in that country. She was quoted as saying, "In a situation of extreme conflict, the fact that you're giving it is taking sides. That isn't in Canada's interest. Canada is interested in development." She later welcomed Monique Mujawamariya to Montreal in April 1994, in the early period of the Rwandan genocide and at a time when Mujawamariya was calling for the retention of United Nations peacekeeping forces in the country.

Almeida-Côté worked for Rights and Democracy until April 2006. She often promoted the concept of universal human rights, saying on one occasion, "It's not just ourselves, it's also Asian NGOs who are saying that you can't talk about economic rights today and political rights sometime in the future. The social, cultural, political and economic all go together." In 2004, she argued that human rights should be accorded at least as much importance as trade in Canada's relations with China.

=== Since 2006 ===
Almeida-Côté was president and chief executive officer of the Canadian Pensions and Benefits Institute from May 2006 to May 2009 and subsequently held the same positions for Canada World Youth from June 2009 to March 2012. She also served on the board of directors of the Canadian Society of Association Executives from 2010 to 2011. In 2012, she has led the organization Innova Connect. She was also appointed to a term as chief executive officer of the Royal Society of Canada in 2015.

She was an advisor for the Conseil interculturel de Montréal from 2006 to 2011, and in 2012 she was selected in the first cohort of the "Diversity 50," an initiative of the Canadian Board Diversity Council to increase diversity on corporate boards. In one interview, Almeida-Côté noted that women board members in Canada tend to come from fields such as accounting and financial management; citing the economist Raghuram Rajan, she identified a need for more representation from academia, public-interest organizations, and related fields.

Almeida-Côté has been included in the Women's Executive Network's list of the Top 100 most powerful women in Canada on two occasions, in 2008 and 2011. She was also awarded the Prix femmes d'affaires du Québec in October 2008, and in 2014 she was one of seven UQAM graduates selected to receive the university's Prix Reconnaissance. The university recognized her for commitment to democracy, human rights, and the protection of the young and of the world's poor, as well as for her skills in management and negotiation.

== Politics ==
Almeida-Côté stood as a candidate for Montreal City Council in the 2017 Montreal municipal election, running for Équipe Denis Coderre pour Montréal in the division of Mile-End in Le Plateau-Mont-Royal. This was not a seat targeted by Coderre's party, and she was defeated by Projet Montréal incumbent Richard Ryan.

== Electoral record ==
2017 Montreal municipal election: Councillor, Mile-End
Party	Candidate	Votes	%	±%
Projet Montréal	Richard Ryan (incumbent)	7,171	71.15	+12.80
Équipe Denis Coderre	Iris Almeida-Côté	2,628	26.08	+10.96
Plateau sans frontières	Halil Sustam	279	2.77	-4.71
Total valid votes		10,078	100	–
Total rejected ballots		255	–	–
Turnout		10,333	48.33	-2.69
Electors on the lists		21,380	–	–
Source: Election results, 2017, City of Montreal.
