= Pierre Desrochers =

Canadian politician

Chair of the Montreal Executive Committee
- In office November 18, 2013 – November 20, 2017
- Preceded by: Josée Duplessis
- Succeeded by: Benoit Dorais

Member of the Montreal Executive Committee responsible for finances, human resources, and legal affairs
- In office November 18, 2013 – November 20, 2017
- Preceded by: Laurent Blanchard
- Succeeded by: Benoit Dorais

Montreal City Councillor for Saint-Sulpice
- In office November 14, 2013 – November 16, 2017
- Preceded by: Jocelyn Ann Campbell
- Succeeded by: Hadrien Parizeau

Personal details
- Party: Équipe Denis Coderre pour Montréal
- Occupation: Management consultant

Pierre Desrochers is a city councillor in Montreal, Quebec, Canada. He represents the Saint-Sulpice District in the borough of Ahuntsic-Cartierville. Desrochers is also the chair of the Montreal Executive Committee. He was first elected in the 2013 municipal election. He is a member of Équipe Denis Coderre pour Montréal.

== Career ==
Desrochers is a former management and strategic communications consultant, working primarily in the oil industry, in which he served as the Director of Corporate and Public Affairs for Eastern Canada at Imperial Oil.

He was also chairman of the Hôpital Maisonneuve-Rosemont, and sat on the board of several non-profit and governmental organizations.
