= Marie Plourde =

Canadian journalist and politician

Le Plateau-Mont-Royal borough councillor for Mile-End
- Incumbent
- Assumed office 2013
- Preceded by: Richard Ryan

Personal details
- Party: Projet Montréal
- Profession: Media personality, journalist

Marie Plourde (born 29 April, 1966) is a politician, media personality, journalist, and occasional actress in Montreal, Quebec, Canada. She has served on the Plateau-Mont-Royal borough council since 2013 as a member of Projet Montréal.

== Early life ==
Plourde was born in Grand-Mère, Quebec (later Shawinigan). She later moved to Montreal to study urban planning.

== Media personality and journalist ==
Plourde began her media career as a MusiquePlus VJ from 1989 to 1993. Later, after a brief stint as host of the Radio-Canada culture program La Ruée vers l'art, she became a television columnist for the tabloid Le Journal de Montréal from 1996 to 2006.

In 1997, Plourde strongly criticized a Public Works Canada television program entitled Services compris that promoted the services of the Canadian federal government. She described it as "an insidious infomercial ... in which federal employees are depicted as superheroes who have come to our rescue from Ottawa."

Plourde hosted the cultural television program Flash in 2001 as a temporary replacement for Patricia Paquin. Later in the decade, she hosted a Canal Vie program called Une chance qu'on s'aime, a literary program called Sous les jaquettes, and the TQS reality television show Loft Story. She also branched out into radio, hosting a program on Rythme FM. A Montreal Gazette article in 2008 described her as a "ubiquitous media celeb[rity]."

== Actress ==
Plourde appeared in the film Le cas Roberge in 2008, playing a television journalist.

== Politician ==
Plourde joined Projet Montréal in 2013 was elected to the Plateau-Mont-Royal borough council for the Mile End division in the 2013 Montreal municipal election. A Postmedia article written during the campaign described her as a star candidate for her party. Projet Montréal emerged from the election as the official opposition at the city level and won every seat on the Plateau-Mont-Royal borough council.

In December 2013, Plourde was appointed to the board of directors of Société de transport de Montréal (STM). The following year, she helped organize a new open-air market in Mile End known as the Marché des Possibles, inspired by Pop Montreal.

She was re-elected in the 2017 municipal election, in which Projet Montréal won the mayoral contest, a majority of seats at city hall, and, once again, all seats on the Plateau-Mont-Royal borough council. On November 27, 2017, she was appointed as chair of the city-level committee on transportation and public works, as well as being re-appointed to the board of STM.

== Electoral record ==
2017 Montreal municipal election: Borough councillor, Mile-End
Party	Candidate	Votes	%	±%
Projet Montréal	Marie Plourde (incumbent)	7,699	76.49	+25.09
Équipe Denis Coderre	Jean David Prophète	2,367	23.51	+12.49
Total valid votes		10,066	100	–
Total rejected ballots		261	–	–
Turnout		10,327	48.30	-2.73
Electors on the lists		21,380	–	–
Source: Election results, 2017, City of Montreal.

2013 Montreal municipal election: Borough councillor, Mile-End
Party	Candidate	Votes	%	±%
Projet Montréal	Marie Plourde	5,447	51.40	+2.88
Vrai changement	David Côté	2,116	19.97	
Coalition Montréal	Stéphanie Grondin	1,609	15.18	-13.33
Équipe Denis Coderre	Sandenga Yeba	1,168	11.02	
Intégrité Montréal	Joaquin Olivo Rodriguez	257	2.43	
Total valid votes		10,597	100	–
Total rejected ballots		285	–	–
Turnout		10,882	51.03	+8.43
Electors on the lists		21,326	–	–
Source: Election results, 2013, City of Montreal.
