= Josée Duplessis =

Montreal city councillor

Chair of the Montreal Executive Committee
- In office June 28, 2013 – November 18, 2013
- Preceded by: Laurent Blanchard
- Succeeded by: Pierre Desrochers

Member of the Montreal Executive Committee responsible for sustainable development, the environment, parks, and green spaces
- In office 2012 – November 18, 2013
- Preceded by: Alan DeSousa
- Succeeded by: Réal Ménard

Montreal City Councillor for De Lorimier
- Incumbent
- Assumed office 2009
- Preceded by: Richard Bergeron

Plateau-Mont-Royal Borough Councillor for De Lorimier
- In office 2005–2009
- Preceded by: position created
- Succeeded by: Carl Boileau

Personal details
- Party: Projet Montréal

Josée Duplessis is a politician in Montreal, Quebec, Canada. She has served on the Montreal city council since 2009, representing De Lorimier as a member of Projet Montréal, and has been a member of the Montreal executive committee since November 2012. In June 2013, she was appointed as chair of the executive committee.

== Borough councillor ==
Duplessis is a sociologist. Before entering political life, she ran a consulting firm that sought to improve the environmental practices of Quebec municipalities.

She was elected to the Plateau-Mont-Royal borough council in the 2005 municipal election as a candidate of Gérald Tremblay's Montreal Island Citizens Union (MICU). Her election victory was extremely narrow; the returns office initially showed Projet Montréal candidate Émilie Thuillier elected by twelve votes, but the final scrutiny showed Duplessis elected by nine. MICU won six of the borough council's seven seats, with the remaining seat going to Projet Montréal leader Richard Bergeron.

In 2006, Duplessis co-operated with Bergeron on a successful motion for the borough to complete the Rachel Street bicycle path. She left Tremblay's party to join Projet Montréal in April 2009.

== City councillor ==
Duplessis was elected to city council for the De Lorimier ward in the 2009 municipal election. Tremblay's party, renamed as Union Montreal, won a majority on council, and Duplessis served as her party's transportation and environment critic.

Gérald Tremblay resigned as mayor in November 2012 amid the backdrop of a corruption scandal and was replaced by Michael Applebaum, who formed a coalition government with representation from all parties on council and some independents. Applebaum announced his executive committee on November 12, 2012, appointing Duplessis as one of two representatives of Projet Montréal. She was given responsibility for sustainable development, the environment, parks, and green spaces.

In February 2013, Duplessis announced an environmental rehabilitation project to turn the former Miron quarry in Saint-Michel into Montreal's second largest green space. The following month, she launched a new working committee on urban agriculture. In late April, she had the city's comptroller general investigate the activities of Groupe Pacific Inc., a firm that had lobbied municipal officials for two years about a proposed housing project at Meadowbrook Golf Course without being properly registered by the province. In the same period, she praised two local environmental groups for drafting a detailed proposal for a public park on the same site.

Michael Applebaum resigned as mayor in June 2013 after being charged with several criminal offenses including fraud and corruption; he maintains that he is innocent. There was some discussion that Duplessis would seek to replace him as interim mayor until the 2013 municipal elections, though she ultimately chose not to do so. City council instead chose Laurent Blanchard for the position; after being sworn in as mayor, Blanchard named Duplessis as chair of the executive committee, the second most powerful position in Montreal's city government.

At a council meeting on July 4, 2013, Duplessis approved a request from some councillors that local restaurants and food establishments be required to post the results of health inspections. Ultimate responsibility for enforcing this measure rests with the provincial government.

By virtue of holding her seat on city council, Duplessis continues to serve on the Plateau-Mont-Royal borough council.

Duplessis announced her retirement from municipal politics on 8 September 2013, declaring that as a single mother, the struggle of work-life balance was too difficult.

== Electoral record ==
2009 Montreal municipal election: Councillor, De Lorimier
Party	Candidate	Votes	%
Projet Montréal	Josée Duplessis	5,403	49.51
Vision Montreal	Martine Hébert	3,907	35.80
Union Montreal	Constance Ramacieri	1,391	12.75
Parti Montréal Ville-Marie	Antoine Bilodeau	211	1.93
Total valid votes		10,912	100
Source: Election results, 2009, City of Montreal.

2005 Montreal municipal election: Plateau-Mont-Royal borough Councillor, De Lorimier
Party	Candidate	Votes	%
Montreal Island Citizens Union	Josée Duplessis	3,002	36.42
Projet Montréal	Émilie Thuillier	2,993	36.31
Vision Montreal	Huguette Trudel	2,247	27.26
Total valid votes		8,242	100
Source: City of Montreal official results (in French), City of Montreal.
