= Caroline Bourgeois =

Canadian politician

Borough mayor for Rivière-des-Prairies–Pointe-aux-Trembles and Montreal City Councillor
- In office December 2018 – November 2025
- Preceded by: Chantal Rouleau
- Succeeded by: Denis Pelletier

Montreal City Councillor for La Pointe-aux-Prairies
- In office November 2009 – November 2013
- Preceded by: Nicolas Montmorency
- Succeeded by: Richard Guay

Personal details
- Party: Projet Montreal
- Other political affiliations: Vision Montréal (2009-2013); Coalition Montréal (2013)

Caroline Bourgeois is a Canadian politician, who served as a Montreal City Councillor for the La Pointe-aux-Prairies ward in the borough of Rivière-des-Prairies–Pointe-aux-Trembles from 2009 to 2025. She served on the Montreal Executive Committee from June 2013.

She was first elected in the 2009 municipal election as a member of the Vision Montréal party, defeating incumbent councillor Nicolas Montmorency. In the 2013 municipal election she changed her party affiliation to the new upstart party Coalition Montreal. She ran in the seat that she held (La Pointe-Aux-Prairies) with Vision Montreal but was defeated by Richard Guay from the Equipe Denis Coderre. She ran in the 2018 Rivière-des-Prairies–Pointe-aux-Trembles mayoral by-election for Projet Montreal and won by a margin for just over 3%. She was re-elected in the 2021 municipal election by a narrow margin of one percent. She ran for a third term in 2025 but was decisively defeated by Denis Pelletier of Ensemble Montréal amid a citywide swing away from Projet Montréal.

== Electoral record ==
2025 Montreal municipal election: Borough Mayor: Rivière-des-Prairies–Pointe-aux-Trembles
Party	Candidate	Votes	%	±%
Ensemble Montréal	Denis Pelletier	11,904	44.09	-2.77
Projet Montréal	Caroline Bourgeois	9,100	33.70	-14.18
Action Montréal	Dora Angiuli	5,014	18.57	new
Futur Montréal	Jaël Régine Chirhalwirwa	983	3.64	new
Total valid votes/expense limit		27,001	96.63	
Total rejected ballots		942	3.37	-0.49
Turnout		27,943	35.04	-3.91
Eligible voters		79,658	–	–

2021 Montreal municipal election: Borough Mayor: Rivière-des-Prairies–Pointe-aux-Trembles
Party	Candidate	Votes	%	±%
Projet Montréal	Caroline Bourgeois	14,330	47.88	-0.11
Ensemble Montréal	Lyne Laperrière	14,027	46.86	+2.15
Mouvement Montréal	Charles Sounan	1,574	5.26	new
Total valid votes/expense limit		29 931	96.46	
Total rejected ballots		1,098	3.86	+2.53
Turnout		31,029	38.95	
Eligible voters		79,658	–	–

Borough Mayor Rivière-des-Prairies–Pointe-aux-Trembles December 16, 2018 By election
Party	Candidate	Votes	%	±%
Projet Montréal	Caroline Bourgeois	5,314	47.99	+5.36
Ensemble Montréal	Manuel Guedes	4,951	44.71	-2.08
Independent	Marius Minier	662	5.98	
Total valid votes/expense limit		10,927	98.67	
Total rejected ballots		147	1.33	-2.24
Turnout		11,074	13.71	
Eligible voters		80,758	–	–

2013 Montreal municipal election: City Councillor La Pointe-aux-Prairies
Party	Candidate	Votes	%	±%
Équipe Denis Coderre	Richard Guay	5,922	50.86	new
Coalition Montréal	Caroline Bourgeois	3,326	28.56	new
Projet Montréal	Paul Therrien	2,396	20.58	
Total valid votes/expense limit		11,644	93.36	
Total rejected ballots		828	6.64	N/A
Turnout		12 472	42.08	
Eligible voters		29,639	–	–
