= Montreal Executive Committee =

The Montreal Executive Committee (French: Comité exécutif de Montréal) is the executive branch of the municipal government of Montreal, Quebec, Canada. The committee reports directly to city hall and is responsible for generating documents such as budgets and by-laws, which are then sent to the Montreal City Council for approval. As of 2017, the committee consists of the mayor of Montreal, twelve members, and five associate members.

After the 2009 municipal election, mayor Gérald Tremblay broke with a longstanding tradition and appointed two members of opposition parties to the committee. Tremblay also broke with precedent in naming himself as chair of the committee. Following Tremblay's resignation in November 2012, interim mayor Michael Applebaum also took a cross-partisan approach, naming a coalition committee with representatives from all three party caucuses as well as the bloc of independent councillors. When Laurent Blanchard, the chair of the executive committee under Applebaum, succeeded Applebaum as mayor in June 2012, he made only minor changes to the executive committee, adding one new member to fill the vacant seat.

Following an offer made during the 2017 election, Mayor Valérie Plante named one opposition member to the council, Verdun borough mayor Jean-François Parenteau of Équipe Coderre. However, he chose to leave the party and sit as an independent.

== Members as of 2024 ==
There are fifteen members of the executive committee, including the mayor, and two associate councillors.

| Name | District | Party | Position |
Members of the Executive Committee
| Émilie Thuillier | Borough Mayor, Ahuntsic-Cartierville | Projet Montréal - Équipe Valérie Plante | Chair of the Executive Committee; Responsible for human resources, infrastructure, buildings and asset maintenance |
| Caroline Bourgeois | Borough Mayor, Rivière-des-Prairies–Pointe-aux-Trembles | Projet Montréal - Équipe Valérie Plante | Vice-Chair of the Executive Committee; Responsible for sports and recreation, Espace pour la vie, the French language and East-end Montréal |
| Benoit Dorais | Borough Mayor, Le Sud-Ouest | Projet Montréal - Équipe Valérie Plante | Vice-Chair of the Executive Committee; Responsible for housing, real estate strategy, property assessment and legal affairs |
| Ericka Alneus | City Councillor, Étienne-Desmarteau (Rosemont—La Petite-Patrie) | Projet Montréal - Équipe Valérie Plante | Responsible for arts, heritage, gastronomy and nightlife |
| Robert Beaudry | City Councillor, Saint-Jacques (Ville-Marie) | Projet Montréal - Équipe Valérie Plante | responsible for urban planning, OCPM and homelessness |
| Josefina Blanco | City Councillor, Saint-Édouard (Rosemont—La Petite-Patrie) | Projet Montréal - Équipe Valérie Plante | Responsible for diversity, social inclusion, universal accessibility, the status of women, youth, and seniors |
| Alia Hassan-Cournol | City Councillor, Maisonneuve–Longue-Pointe (Mercier–Hochelaga-Maisonneuve) | Projet Montréal - Équipe Valérie Plante | Responsible for economic development and higher education, the fight against racism and systemic discrimination and associate advisor for reconciliation with Indigenous peoples |
| François Limoges | Borough Mayor, Rosemont–La Petite-Patrie | Projet Montréal - Équipe Valérie Plante | Responsible for consultation with the boroughs |
| Marie-Andrée Mauger | Borough Mayor, Verdun | Projet Montréal - Équipe Valérie Plante | Responsible for the ecological transition and the environment |
| Sophie Mauzerolle | City Councillor, Sainte-Marie (Ville-Marie) | Projet Montréal - Équipe Valérie Plante | Responsible for transportation and mobility |
| Alex Norris | City Councillor, Jeanne-Mance (Le Plateau-Mont-Royal) | Projet Montréal - Équipe Valérie Plante | Responsible for large parks and Mount-Royal |
| Sylvain Ouellet | City Councillor, François-Perrault (Villeray–Saint-Michel–Parc-Extension) | Projet Montréal - Équipe Valérie Plante | Responsible for waterworks |
| Valérie Plante | Mayor of Montréal Borough Mayor, Ville-Marie | Projet Montréal - Équipe Valérie Plante | Responsible for international relations, reconciliation with Indigenous peoples, Montréal's downtown and international economic development |
| Magda Popeanu | City Councillor, Côte-des-Neiges (Côte-des-Neiges–Notre-Dame-de-Grâce) | Projet Montréal - Équipe Valérie Plante | Responsible for organizational performance, citizen participation and democracy |
| Alain Vaillancourt | City Councillor, Saint-Paul-Émard-Saint-Henri-Ouest (Le Sud-Ouest) | Projet Montréal - Équipe Valérie Plante | Responsible for public security |
Associate Councillors
| Marianne Giguère | City Councillor, De Lorimier (Le Plateau-Mont-Royal) | Projet Montréal - Équipe Valérie Plante | Associate councillor for mobility and the city's Bike Plan |
| Despina Sourias | City Councillor, Loyola (Côte-des-Neiges–Notre-Dame-de-Grâce) | Projet Montréal - Équipe Valérie Plante | Associate councillor for housing, sanitation and protection of the city's rental housing stock |

== 2013-2017 Executive Council ==
Council under mayor Denis Coderre from November 14, 2013 – November 16, 2017.

| Name | Party | Position |
|---|---|---|
| Pierre Desrochers | Équipe Denis Coderre pour Montréal | Chair of the executive committee Finance, major projects, human capital, corporate communications, legal affairs and assessment |
| Harout Chitilian | Équipe Denis Coderre pour Montréal | Vice-chair of the executive committee Administrative reform, information technology, Smart City project |
| Anie Samson | Équipe Denis Coderre pour Montréal | Vice-chair of the executive committee Public safety, services |
| Dimitrios Jim Beis | Équipe Denis Coderre pour Montréal | Procurement, sports, cultural communities |
| Denis Coderre | Équipe Denis Coderre pour Montréal | Mayor of Montreal Finances, human resources, legal affairs |
| Russell Copeman | Équipe Denis Coderre pour Montréal | Housing, urban planning, real estate and real estate transactions, and strategies, Office of Public Consultation |
| Manon Gauthier | Équipe Denis Coderre pour Montréal | Culture, heritage |
| Réal Ménard | Équipe Denis Coderre pour Montréal | Sustainable development, environment, large parks, green spaces |
| Lionel Perez | Équipe Denis Coderre pour Montréal | Infrastructure, the electrical services commission, governance, democracy, government relations |
| Chantal Rouleau | Équipe Denis Coderre pour Montréal | Water, water infrastructure |
| Aref Salem | Équipe Denis Coderre pour Montréal | Transport |
| Monique Vallée | Équipe Denis Coderre pour Montréal | Social and community development, homelessness |
