= BPR (Quebec firm) =

BPR is an engineering firm in the Canadian province of Quebec.

== History ==
According to BPR's website, the firm was founded in 1961 by a trio of engineers named Beaulieu, Poulin, and Robitaille. It expanded its activities throughout Quebec in the 1980s, and in 2002 it established a joint venture in Montreal with the Bechtel Group. It became part of the Tetra Tech group of companies on October 5, 2010.

In 2008, the municipal government of Montreal gave BPR responsibility for overseeing aspects of the bidding process for a contract to overhaul the city's waterworks. According to an article in the Montreal Gazette, BPR was responsible for such matters as "writing the tender specifications for a contract, taking part in information sessions with bidders and even helping to assess the bids," all of which are "traditionally reserved for the civil service." The city's auditor-general strongly questioned the bidding process, leading to its cancellation by Montreal mayor Gérald Tremblay.

== Charbonneau Commission and after ==
In March 2013, Pierre Lavallée, president of BPR Inc., testified before the Charbonneau Commission on corruption in Montreal's construction sector. He stated that his firm had tried to expand its Montreal operations in the early 2000s, but had been unable to make much progress until meeting with political fundraiser Bernard Trépanier and being told to funnel three per cent of every project they won to the Union Montreal municipal party. Lavallée testified that he found this arrangement "shameful and degrading" but had been advised by a prominent employee that his firm would not otherwise be successful. BPR allegedly agreed to the kickback scheme and funneled between $145,000 and $155,000 to the party.

Gazette reporter Henry Aubin subsequently cited Lavallée as one of the very few corporate leaders to express any regret for their business decisions to the Charbonneau Commission. Lavallée resigned his position with the company in April 2013.

In August 2013, new Montreal mayor Laurent Blanchard reluctantly announced that new municipal contracts for infrastructure renewal would be awarded to BPR and SNC-Lavalin, another firm cited at the Charbonneau Commission for alleged bid-rigging. In explaining this decision, Blanchard noted that the relevant call for tenders had been issued in late 2012, a few weeks before the city adopted more stringent contracting rules; he also stated that starting the process over would result in delays and unsafe road conditions. "It wasn't an easy decision, but, legally, we had no choice," Blanchard said. "We understand that Montrealers will ask 'why?'"

== Links to federal political parties ==
BPR was described in 2012 as having close ties to the Conservative Party of Canada. Leo Housakos was hired in late 2008 to oversee one of BPR's wholly owned subsidiaries and, shortly thereafter, was appointed to the Senate of Canada by Canadian prime minister Stephen Harper. He remained employed with the BPR subsidiary until October 2009, when he was advised by the Senate's ethics officer that he could not simultaneously fill both roles. An investigation cleared him of any conflict-of-interest pertaining to his time with the firm.
