= Alex Norris (Canadian politician) =

Canadian politician

City councillor for the Jeanne-Mance district, Le Plateau Mont-Royal
- Incumbent
- Assumed office 2009

Personal details
- Party: Projet Montréal

Alex Norris is a Canadian municipal politician and incumbent city councillor for the Jeanne-Mance district in Le Plateau Mont-Royal borough in Montreal. He is a member of the Projet Montréal municipal party.

A former reporter, researcher and journalist, Norris has become, since first elected in 2009, a local voice against corruption and in favor of transparency at the Montreal City Hall. He has initiated reforms in administrative transparency and has led the fight to reduce violence on Saint-Laurent Boulevard. Norris also spoke on behalf of a number of green and traffic initiatives, including improvements to the Rachel Street bike path.

In 2026, Norris endorsed Avi Lewis in that year's federal NDP leadership race.

Before embarking on municipal politics, Norris taught journalism abroad as part of an international initiative to fight corruption and also worked for The Montreal Gazette for 16 years.

== Electoral record ==
2017 Montreal municipal election: Councillor, Jeanne-Mance
Party	Candidate	Votes	%	±%
Projet Montréal	Alex Norris (incumbent)	5,390	62.43	+15.23
Équipe Denis Coderre	Marc-Antoine Desjardins	2,763	32.01	+15.88
Coalition Montréal	Deborah Rankin	338	3.92	-23.10
Plateau sans frontières	Joash Whyte	142	1.64	-4.11
Total valid votes		8,633	100	–
Total rejected ballots		200	–	–
Turnout		8,833	42.12	-3.06
Electors on the lists		20,970	–	–
Source: Election results, 2017, City of Montreal.

2013 Montreal municipal election: Councillor, Jeanne-Mance
Party	Candidate	Votes	%	±%
Projet Montréal	Alex Norris (incumbent for Mile-End)	4,252	47.20	
Coalition Montréal	Piper Huggins	2,434	27.02	
Équipe Denis Coderre	Eleni Fakotakis-Kolaitis	1,453	16.13	
Intégrité Montréal	Dominique Caron	518	5.75	
Independent	João Neves	224	2.49	
Independent	Daniel Simon	128	1.42	
Total valid votes		9,009	100	–
Total rejected ballots		290	–	–
Turnout		9,299	45.18	–
Electors on the lists		20,584	–	–
Source: Election results, 2013, City of Montreal.

2009 Montreal municipal election: Councillor, Mile-End
Party	Candidate	Votes	%	±%
Projet Montréal	Alex Norris	4,262	47.51	
Vision Montreal	Pierre Marquis	2,552	28.45	
Union Montreal	Robert Pilon	1,885	21.01	
Montréal Ville-Marie	Juliana Contreras	272	3.03	
Total valid votes		8,971	100	–
Total rejected ballots		280	–	–
Turnout		9,251	42.60	–
Electors on the lists		21,719	–	–
Source: Election results, 2009, City of Montreal.
