= Marcel Côté =

Canadian economist and politician

- Born: July 29, 1942; Malartic, Quebec
- Died: May 25, 2014 (aged 71); Joliette, Quebec
- Education: University of Ottawa, Carnegie Mellon University
- Occupation: Economist
- Known for: Candidate for Mayor of Montreal
- Website: marcelcote.ca

Marcel Côté (July 29, 1942 – May 25, 2014) was a Canadian economist and politician. He was a founding partner of SECOR, a strategic management consulting firm. On July 3, 2013, he announced his candidacy for Mayor of Montreal in the 2013 Montreal municipal election.

== Early life and education ==
Born in Malartic, Quebec, Côté obtained a bachelor's degree in physical science from the University of Ottawa in 1966 and a master's degree in economics from Carnegie Mellon University in Pittsburgh in 1969. He also received the title of Fellow of the Weatherhead Center for International Affairs at Harvard University in 1986.

== Career ==
On the academic side, Marcel Côté taught at Université de Sherbrooke and Université du Québec à Montreal.

In the 1973 Quebec general election, Côté was a candidate for Union Nationale in the riding of Sherbrooke, but lost to Jean-Paul Pépin of the Quebec Liberal Party.

In 1975, Côté founded SECOR and held the position of a founding member after its acquisition by KPMG in 2012.

From 1986 to 1988, Marcel Côté served as economic advisor to the Premier of Quebec Robert Bourassa. In 1989 and 1990, he held the position of Director of Strategic Planning and Communications for Canadian Prime Minister Brian Mulroney.

Marcel Coté sat on the boards of directors of Osisko Mining and Empire Company. He had previously served on the boards of ING Bank of Canada and Intact Financial.

As an economist, Marcel Côté specialized in regional and technological development. He wrote several books on the subject. In 2010, he co-chaired a working group on issues of governance and taxation in Montreal which published the "Côté-Séguin Report: A city that lives up to our aspirations".

Marcel Coté chaired the board of directors of the Montreal YMCA, the board of directors of the Foundation of the YMCAs of Quebec, the YMCAs of Quebec Mentors' Circle, and the Board of Directors of the Foundation of Greater Montreal. He was a member of the Board of Directors of Imagine Canada, the Institute for Research on Public Policy (IRPP) and the Public Policy Forum.

In 2013, he served as a director on the boards of the Montreal Symphony Orchestra, Les amis de la montagne, Montreal High Lights Festival, Action Canada and Brain Canada. He also participated in the Table d’action en entrepreneuriat de Montréal and chaired the Board of Directors of Compagnie Marie Chouinard.

In 2012, Côté received the Prix Arts-Affaires de Montréal.

== Political career ==
On July 3, 2013, Marcel Côté officially announced his candidacy for Mayor of Montreal. He led Coalition Montréal, a coalition formed of independent candidates and Vision Montreal candidates previously led by Louise Harel.

== Death ==
On May 25, 2014, Marcel Côté died of cardiac arrest during an organised bicycle ride.

== Bibliography ==
- By Way of Advice: Growth Strategies for the Market Driven World, (Mosaic Press, 1991)
- Growing the Next Silicon Valley, (Lexington Press, 1986), Work co-written with Roger Miller
- If Quebec goes... The Real Cost of Separation (Stoddart, 1995), Work co-written with David Johnston
- Le Rêve d'une terre promise (Stanké, 2004)
- A city that lives up to our aspirations (Côté-Séguin Report, 2010)
- Innovation Reinvented (University of Toronto Press), Work co-written with Roger Miller
