= Prix Arts-Affaires de Montréal =

The Prix Arts-Affaires de Montréal are an initiative of the Conseil des arts de Montréal and the Board of Trade of Metropolitan Montreal, in partnership with Quebecor Inc., SITQ, in collaboration with daily newspaper Le Devoir, to reward businesses and individuals who have shown their support for Montréal arts and cultural organizations. A multidisciplinary design collective called Rita, composed of Stéphane Halmaï-Voisard, Karine Corbeil, and Francis Rollin, created the work of art that is presented to Prix Arts-Affaires winners.

The winners of the 2007 Prix Arts-Affaires de Montréal were as follows: SSQ Financial Group (Large enterprise category), TP1 (SME category), and Florence Junca-Adenot, UQAM professor, (Arts/Business personality category).

In 2006, the winners were Quebecor Inc. (Large enterprise category), the Caisse populaire Desjardins Group du Mont-Royal (SME category), and Alvin Segal, president and CEO of Vêtements Peerless Clothing Inc. (Arts/Business personality category). A citation of excellence was also presented to the Fasken Martineau law firm.
