= Magda Popeanu =

Canadian politician

Montreal City Councillor for Côte-des-Neiges
- In office 2013–2025
- Preceded by: Helen Fotopulos
- Succeeded by: Émilie Brière

Personal details
- Born: May 20, 1956 (age 70) Târgoviște, Romania
- Party: Projet Montréal
- Education: Gheorghe Asachi Technical University of Iași, 1980

Magda (Bîrsan) Popeanu (born May 20, 1956) is a Canadian politician.

She was born in Târgoviște, Romania, and graduated from Alexandru Ioan Cuza High School in Iași. After getting a BA in Electronics Engineering from Gheorghe Asachi Technical University of Iași in 1980 she worked in computer sciences. Popeanu was a 1989 Romanian revolutionary. She immigrated to Canada in 1992. She taught computer engineering for Commission scolaire Marguerite-Bourgeoys for many years.

Popeanu was a candidate for Projet Montréal in the 2005 and 2009 elections in Côte-des-Neiges district where she obtained 16% and 31.6% of the vote, respectively. Popeanu served as the president of Projet Montréal from 2006. Popeanu also served as a member of Montreal City Council, representing the district of Côte-des-Neiges in the borough of Côte-des-Neiges–Notre-Dame-de-Grâce. Popeanu has served on Montreal city council from 2013 to 2025.
