= Benoit Dorais =

Canadian politician

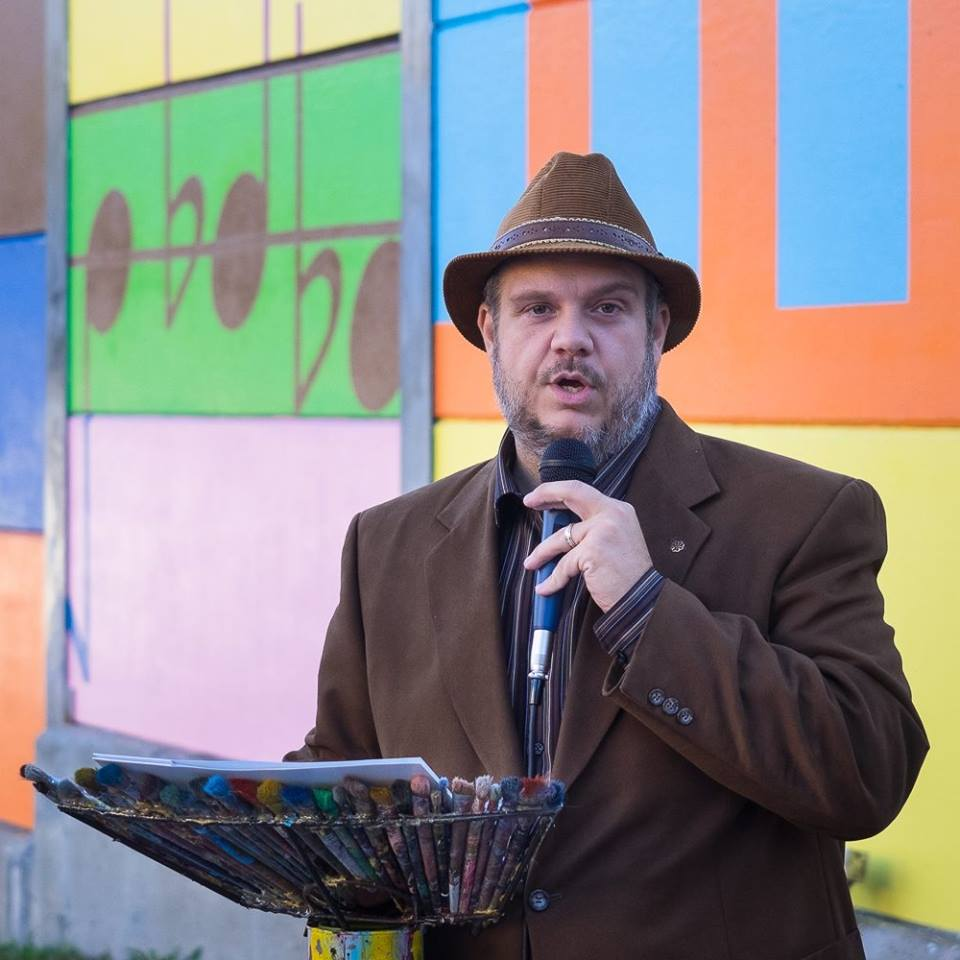

Borough mayor for Le Sud-Ouest and Montreal City Councillor
- In office January 1, 2010 – November 2, 2025
- Preceded by: Jacqueline Montpetit
- Succeeded by: Véronique Fournier

Personal details
- Party: Projet Montréal (2017 - Present)
- Other political affiliations: Coalition Montréal (2013 - 2017); Vision Montréal (2009 - 2013)

Benoit Dorais is a city councillor from Montreal, Quebec, Canada. He served as the borough mayor of Le Sud-Ouest from 2009 to 2025. From his first election to 2013, Dorais was a member of Vision Montreal, before joining Coalition Montréal in 2013 and Projet Montréal before the 2017 municipal election.

Dorais was born and raised in the Saint-Henri neighbourhood. Before his election as city councillor, Dorais served as a political staff member to former Bloc Québécois MP Thierry St-Cyr. He has also served as a commissioner with the Commission scolaire de Montréal since 2007. He holds a university degree in philosophy and social ethics.

Following Marcel Côté's death on May 26, 2014, Dorais became leader of Coalition Montreal. In 2017 he resigned that role to sit as an independent, joining Projet Montréal soon after, prior to the 2017 elections.

Dorais chaired the City of Montreal committee on social development and Montreal diversity. Following the 2017 election, Mayor Valérie Plante named him chair of the Montreal Executive Committee, with responsibility for finances, human resources, and legal affairs.

== Electoral record ==
2009 Montreal municipal election: Borough Mayor, Le Sud-Ouest
Party	Candidate	Votes	%
Vision Montreal	Benoit Dorais	4,848	28.41
Union Montreal	Nicole Boudreau	4,821	28.25
Independent	Line Hamel	3,586	21.01
Projet Montréal	Mudi Wa Mbuji Kabeya	3,275	19.19
Independent	Camillien Delisle	537	3.15
Total valid votes		17,067	100
Source: Election results, 2009, City of Montreal.
