= Marvin Rotrand =

Canadian politician

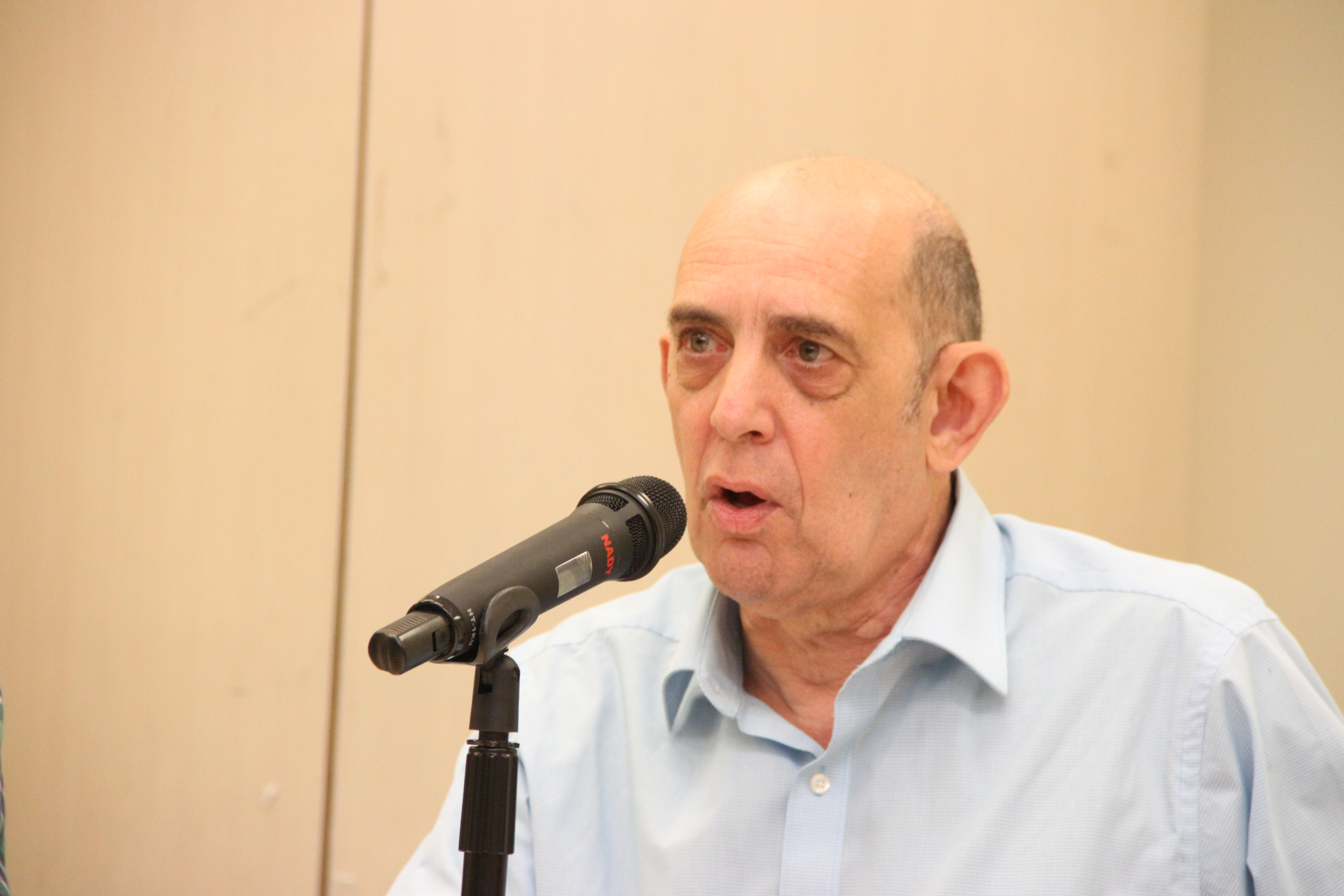
Rotrand in 2017

Marvin Rotrand (born 1951) is a former Canadian politician, last sitting as an independent. He previously served as a member of Montreal City Council, representing the district of Snowdon. Rotrand served on Montreal city council from 1982 until 2021, and was its dean for several years; he worked full-time in his duties. Rotrand was serving B’Nai Brith Canada as its national director of the League of Human Rights.

== Background ==
Born in Montreal, son of a Holocaust survivor, Rotrand holds a Bachelor of Arts in history from Sir George Williams University and a Bachelor of Education from McGill University. Prior to becoming a city councillor, he was a high school history teacher.

Rotrand was a member of the Montreal Citizens' Movement (MCM). He left for the Coalition Démocratique in 1989.

Latterly a member of Gerald Tremblay's Union Montréal political party, Rotrand quit to sit as an independent on November 15, 2012, following the corruption allegations against the party in the Charbonneau commission hearings. In the election of November 3, 2013, he was elected as a councilor for Coalition Montreal - Equipe Marcel Cote, of which he eventually became interim leader.

From 2002 to 2017, he also served as the vice-chair of the Société de transport de Montréal (Montreal Transit Commission) and the president of its finance committee and of its customer service committee.

Rotrand was evidently removed from that position without notice on an order from then-mayor Denis Coderre. During a municipal council meeting, Coderre confirmed the dismissal of Rotrand who had decided not to join the Équipe Denis Coderre party. Coderre replaced Rotrand with Elsie Lefebvre, who had also won the last election under the Coalition Montréal party, but left it to join Coderre's party. Both Coderre and Lefebvre lost in the subsequent election. Rotrand was the only member of Coalition Montréal elected.

In January 2019, with steps being taken to dissolve Coalition Montréal, Rotrand announced that he would sit as an independent.

Rotrand was restored in 2017 to the STM's board of directors by then-incoming mayor Valerie Plante. In 2018, Rotrand was ousted from the Société de transport de Montréal board, and stated that his termination may be due to opposition to Plante's Projet Montréal administration.

Rotrand was awarded a prize by the Canadian Urban Transit Association for Distinguished Service to Transit in Canada.
