= Richard Bergeron =

Canadian politician

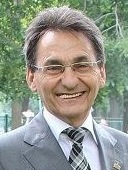
- Bergeron in 2013

Montreal City councillor for Saint-Jacques
- In office 2013–2017
- Preceded by: François Robillard
- Succeeded by: Robert Beaudry

Montreal City councillor for Jeanne-Mance
- In office 2009–2013
- Preceded by: Michel Prescott
- Succeeded by: Alex Norris

Montreal City councillor for De Lorimier
- In office 2005–2009
- Preceded by: position created
- Succeeded by: Josée Duplessis

Personal details
- Born: 1955 (age 70–71) Alma, Quebec, Canada
- Party: Équipe Denis Coderre
- Other political affiliations: Projet Montréal (2004-2014)
- Spouse: Amina Ouaqouaq
- Children: Guillaume, Nadianie
- Education: Université de Montréal
- Profession: Urban planner

Richard Bergeron (born 1955) is a Canadian politician and former Montreal city councillor. He founded Projet Montréal, a municipal political party, and was its leader until 2014. He was the party's mayoralty candidate in the 2005, 2009 and 2013 municipal elections. He is a Montreal City Councillor for the Saint-Jacques district in the Ville-Marie borough and is a member of city council's Commission sur la mise en valeur du territoire et du patrimoine.

== Background ==
Richard Bergeron was born in 1955 in Alma, Quebec. He moved to Montreal in 1975 where he acquired a bachelor's degree in Architecture, a master's in Urban Planning, and a doctorate in Regional Planning from Université de Montréal. He has practiced architecture, been an urban planning consultant and taught at l'Institut d'urbanisme. Associated with several research projects concerning urban policy, urban services management and the environment, he has travelled in numerous countries, including Burkina Faso, Haïti and Morocco.

Bergeron was subsequently president of the Fédération des coopératives d'habitation de l'île de Montréal (Montreal Island Federation of Housing Co-operatives), an invited professor at l'Université Laval and a researcher. From 1996, as a consultant to the Ministère de la Métropole, he produced some ten studies on the redevelopment potential of vacant spaces around Montreal metro stations. Starting in 2000, he was responsible for strategic analysis for l'Agence métropolitaine de transport. As an urban planner and researcher, he has a specialized in transportation, real estate economics and the environment. He favours the return of the tramway to Montreal, an efficient and modern tramway that he calls the "New Tramway".

Bergeron is married to Amina Ouaqouaq (of Moroccan origin), and the father of two children Guillaume and Nadianie. In the early 1990s, Bergeron converted to Islam out of love for his wife and respect for his Moroccan in-laws. He has stated that neither he, nor his wife, are practicing Islam.

== Municipal politics ==
In 2005, Bergeron ran simultaneously for Mayor of Montreal and City Councillor for the district of DeLorimier, located in the Borough of Plateau-Mont-Royal, under the Projet Montréal label. As a Montreal city councilor, Bergeron asked the Quebec transport ministry and the City of Montreal to reconstruct the Turcot Interchange in such a way as to create an urban boulevard with a large capacity for high-quality public transportation. He asked the City of Montreal to preserve remaining green spaces, submitted proposals for improving the quality of snow removal in Montreal and demanded that future scandals be avoided by limiting donations to municipal political parties to $300 per person per year, by having the executive committee hold its meetings in public and by returning the supervision of its projects to the City of Montreal. On May 2, 2009, the Projet Montréal leader lodged a complaint with the Sûreté du Québec concerning the contract for water meters and the apparent link between it and the sale of the Contrecoeur site by the SHDM. He asked the police to investigate the role of certain elected officials, highly placed civil servants or directors of the current administration in these matters.

Projet Montreal is a municipal political party, founded in November 2004. It advocates sustainable urbanism, a philosophy that emphasizes the need for an administration and an environment that are friendlier to pedestrians.

In 2005, Bergeron finished a distant third in the mayoral contest with 8.5% of the vote. Incumbent Gérald Tremblay was re-elected. However, Bergeron was elected to the City Council with 36.5% of the ballots. His closest opponent received 33.7% of the vote.

=== 2009 election ===
On August 9, 2009, John H. Gomery announced that he would be the honorary president of the fundraising campaign of Projet Montréal.

On October 2, 2009, Bergeron announced his party's plan to open up the southern water front (now cast unused industrial zoned space) to residents as well as redevelop the eastern tip of Saint Helen's Island, which is now a parking lot.

On October 6, 2009, prior to the debate at the Conseil Régional de l'Environnement, Bergeron released his party's Plan for a Sustainable Montreal, something for which his party, Projet Montreal, is known hold high in its ideals.

On October 8, 2009, Bergeron unveiled his party's plan for public transportation, in which he suggested that the price of STM monthly passes be reduced to $60 for adults and $30 for students. Moreover, Bergeron has stated he would ask the government to study the extension of the Line 5 Blue (Montreal Metro) west towards Notre-Dame-de-Grâce and Montreal West train station.

On October 19, accompanied by his chairman of fundraising, Justice John Gomery, Bergeron demanded a provincial inquiry into the financing of political parties.

The poll done between October 14–15, 2009 and published October 19, 2009, had Bergeron at 23%, while his two main opponents were said to be at 37% and 36% (Harel and Tremblay respectively). This poll however was done before the Benoit Labonté and Bernard Trépanier scandals had broken.

The final poll (done over October 28 and 29 and published October 30, Angus Reid) put Bergeron at 32%, with Louise Harel at 34% and incumbent Gérald Tremblay in last place at 30%.

Besides Gomery, many notable celebrities came out to support Bergeron in the later stages of the campaign, including the Gazette's Henry Aubin, world-renowned philosopher and McGill emeritus, Charles Taylor, as well as a group of fifty local artists in their letter 'for the love of Montreal'

Despite polling at a statistical tie shortly before the election, Bergeron finished third in the mayoralty race. However, after being the only member of Projet Montréal elected in the previous election, he led his party to the election of two borough mayors, ten seats on city council, and four borough councillors, including control of the borough of Le Plateau-Mont-Royal. Bergeron himself was elected city councillor for the district of Jeanne-Mance via his co-candidate Nimâ Machouf.

On November 17, 2009, Bergeron was appointed by Tremblay to the city's executive committee, becoming responsible for urban planning. He joined Lyn Thériault of Vision Montréal as opposition members on the Council, in a move meant to foster cooperation.

Less than one year later, on November 4, 2010, Tremblay asked Bergeron to step down from the executive committee over his refusal to support a proposal to revamp the aging Turcot interchange.

2009 Montreal municipal election
Candidate	Party	Vote	%
Gérald Tremblay (incumbent)	Union Montréal	159,020	37.90%
Louise Harel	Vision Montréal	137,301	32.73%
Richard Bergeron	Projet Montréal	106,768	25.45%
Louise O'Sullivan	Parti Montréal - Ville-Marie	8,490	2.02%
Michel Bédard	Fierté Montréal	5,297	1.26%
Michel Prairie	Independent	2,648	0.63%

=== 2013 election ===
Bergeron again ran for mayor in 2013, against Denis Coderre, Mélanie Joly and Marcel Côté. He finished third with 25.45% of the popular vote, but retained a seat on council, this time in the district of Saint-Jacques. Coderre was elected the new mayor of Montreal.

On November 18, 2014, Bergeron left Projet Montréal to sit as an independent and join his former rival Denis Coderre's executive committee. His role is to oversee urban development in the downtown core. He will focus on covering the eastern section of the Ville-Marie Expressway and implementing a tram system in the city.

== September 11 attacks ==
Bergeron, in his 2005 book, Les Québécois au volant, c'est mortel, wrote a paragraph which raised questions about the events surrounding the September 11 attacks.

Direct quote:

No one knows what really happened on Sept. 11, 2001. We have been sated with pictures of two airliners striking the twin towers of the World Trade Centre. This is the only event of which we can be sure. The reasons for this act remain unknown. As for the two other planes that would have crashed — one on the Pentagon, in Washington, and one in Pennsylvania — they resemble a macabre farce, in my opinion. Everyone knows that any airplane crash produces an abundance of debris. Yet no one has seen any debris at all at the Pentagon or Pennsylvania. I personally don't believe 60-tonne planes can simply vanish. It might be that what we witnessed on Sept. 11, 2001, was a simple act of state banditry of titanic proportions. The events of that fateful day provided the mafias surrounding George W. Bush with a pretext for taking over the petroleum reserves of the Persian Gulf.

In an interview in 2009 with La Presse Bergeron was quoted as saying,

I am damn proud of that paragraph. I worked really hard on it. I had 10 people read it and they all said "don't do it". Even my editor. My duty as an academic was to incite intellectual questioning. It is a frivolous question to ask whether I agree with it or not.

In an October 2013 interview on CBC Radio's Daybreak, he backed away from his comments saying:

I wanted to shock people, because I was a writer, I was writing an essay and our objective when we do that is to shock people just for fun. I'm not in that life anymore — I'm a candidate to run Montreal for the third time. That was in my previous life and I was a bit stupid at that time,
