= Plateau sans frontières =

Political Party of Montreal

Plateau sans frontières, formerly Intégrité Montréal (English: Montreal Integrity), is a municipal political party in Montreal, Quebec, Canada.

== History ==
The party was founded as Intégrité Montréal to contest the 2013 Montreal municipal elections. Its leader and mayoral candidate was Michel Brûlé, a publisher, author, and singer familiar in Quebec media circles. A 2013 news article described him as the second largest publisher in Quebec in terms of sales; one of his companies, Éditions les Intouchables, focused on the publication of children's books. He was also regarded as a Quebec sovereigntist. Brûlé published a book in 2009 entitled Anglaid which focused on imperialism and ethnocentrism in English culture, and he was known for making controversial statements such as, "English is not a beautiful language." He acknowledged that he was unlikely to win much support from Montreal's anglophone community.

The party's platform called for a reduction in the number of elected municipal officials from 103 to 31, an increased focus on arts and culture in public spaces, and free public transit for the elderly and parents with young children. Brûlé also called for Montreal to be promoted as a French rather than a bilingual city.

== 2013 election ==
Intégrité Montréal ran twenty-four candidates in 2013; in addition to Brûlé, the party ran five candidates for borough mayor positions, seventeen for Montreal city council, and two for borough council seats. Its primary focus was the borough of Ahuntsic-Cartierville, where it contested every available seat. Brûlé received 6,308 votes (1.36%) and finished fifth in the mayoral contest, and none of the party's other candidates were successful.

== 2017 election ==
The party changed its name to Plateau sans frontières on July 20, 2017. In the 2017 municipal election, it ran candidates in the borough of Le Plateau-Mont-Royal only; leader Michel Brûlé ran for borough mayor.

During the race, allegations of sexual harassment emerged against Michel Brûlé. Brûlé denied the allegations. However, Brûlé withdrew from the race, as did two of the party's three candidates for borough council and one of its three candidates for city council. None of the three remaining candidates were elected; the highest showing among them was 2.77% of the vote.
