= Coalition Montréal =

Political party in Canada

- Defunct municipal party
- Founded: July 3, 2013
- Political position: Centre-right
- Colours: Blue and Orange

Coalition Montréal (Montreal Coalition) was a municipal political party in Montreal, Quebec, Canada, formed in 2013 to support the candidacy of Marcel Côté for mayor of Montreal. The party competed for the first time in the 2013 municipal election. The party was formed by former members of the Union Montreal party (such as councillor Marvin Rotrand), as well as the Vision Montreal party and its former leader (Louise Harel).

Following Marcel Côté's death on May 25, 2014, Benoit Dorais became party leader. He resigned that position on December 26, 2016 to sit as an independent councillor, before joining Projet Montréal for the 2017 elections.

Marvin Rotrand had served as interim leader of the coalition, and its only representative on Montreal city council until 2021. Under its rules, he sat as an independent councillor.
