= 2009 Montreal municipal election =

- November 3, 2013
- Mayoral election
- November 2, 2009
- Turnout: 39.44%
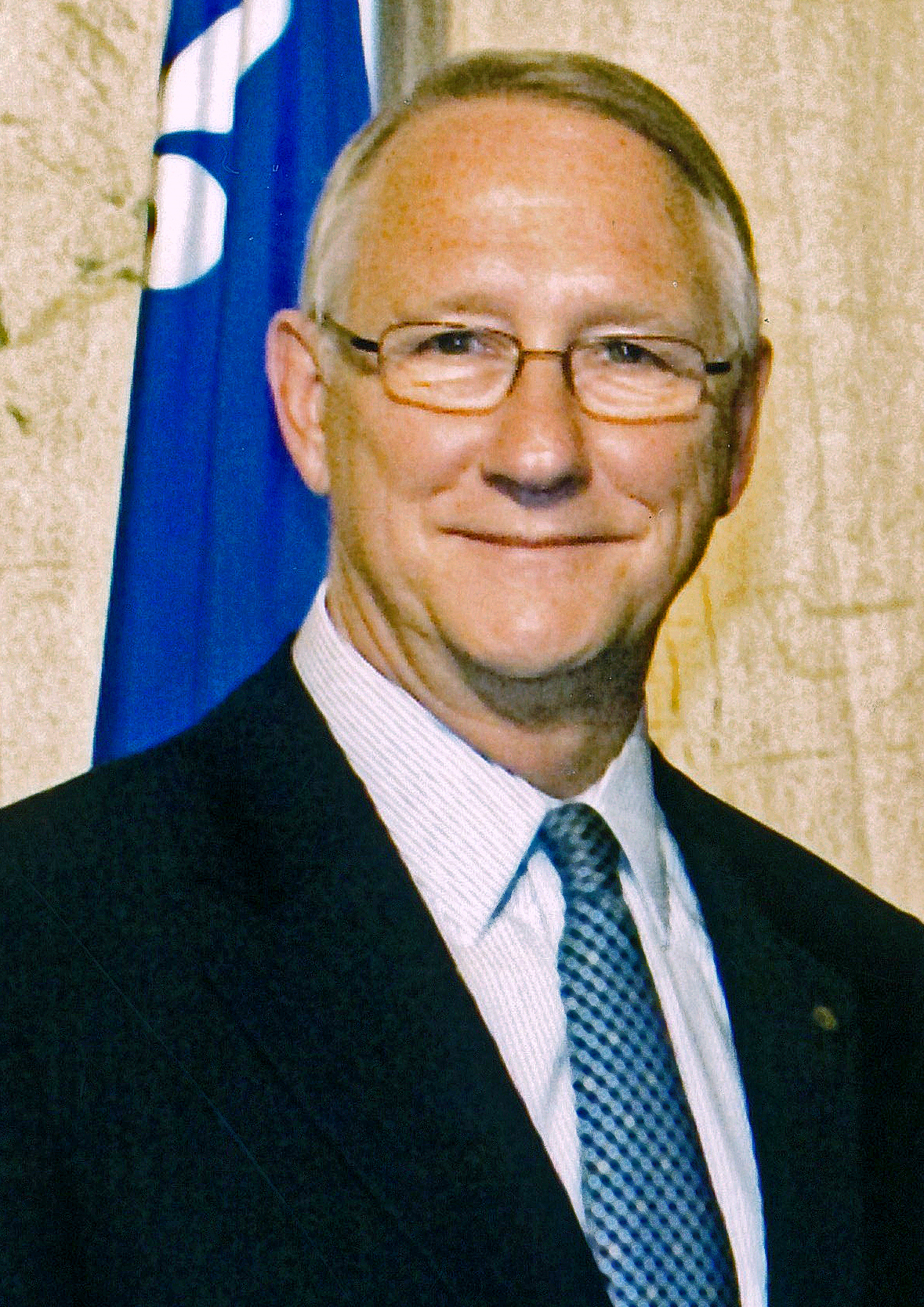

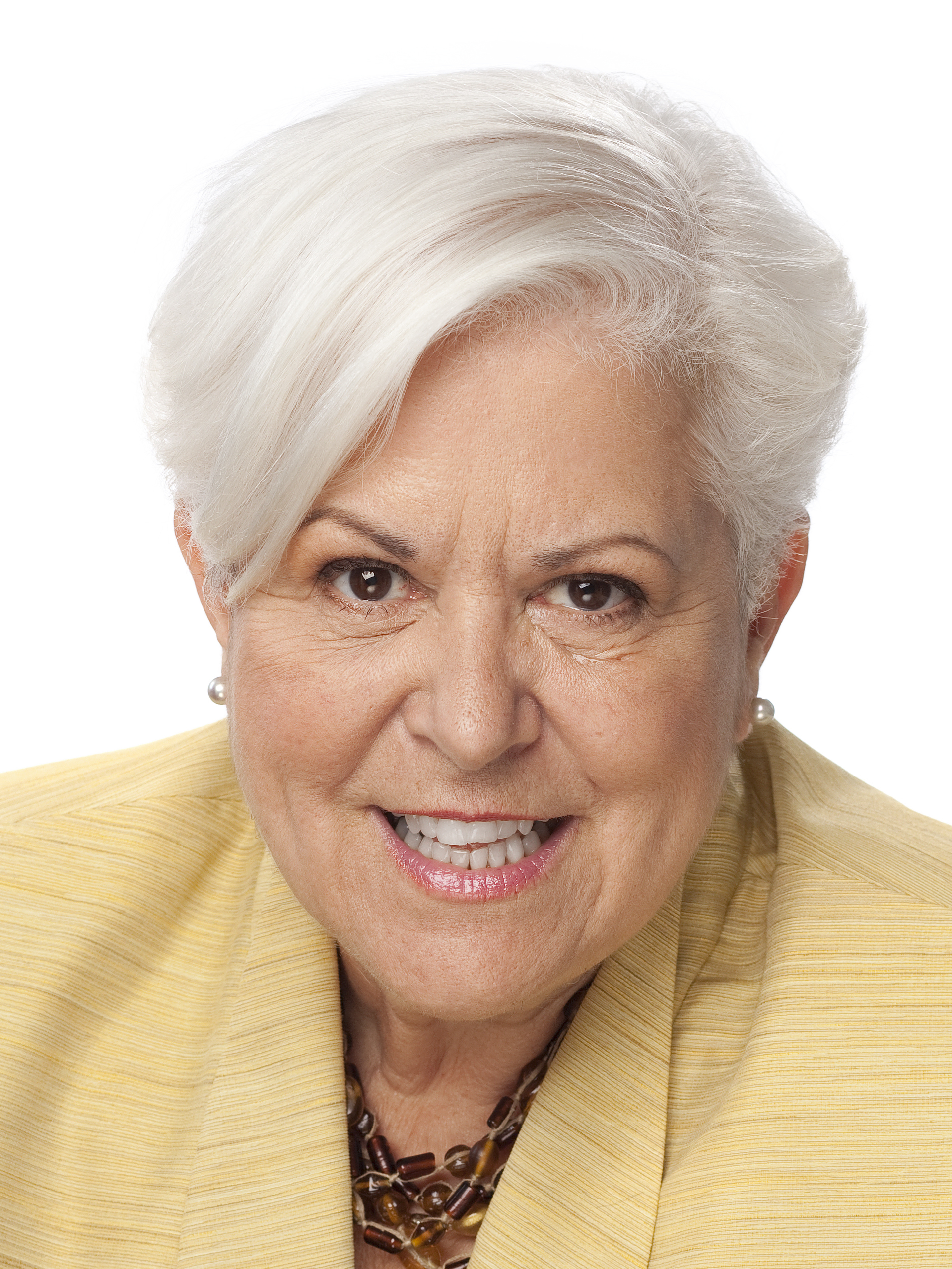

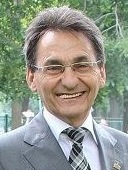
Party	Union Montreal	Vision Montreal	Projet Montréal
Popular vote	159,020	137,301	106,768
Percentage	37.90%	32.73%	25.45%
Mayor before election
Gérald Tremblay
Union Montreal
Elected mayor
Gérald Tremblay
Union Montreal
- City Council election
- November 2, 2009
- 65 seats on Montreal City Council (Note: The mayor is a member of City Council, but for the purposes of documentation is treated as their own individual.); 33 seats needed for a majority
Party	Leader	Seats	+/–
Union Montreal	Gérald Tremblay	38	−9
Vision Montreal	Louise Harel	16	+2
Projet Montréal	Richard Bergeron	10	+9
This lists parties that won seats. See the complete results below.

The city of Montreal, Quebec, Canada, held a municipal election at the same time as numerous other municipalities in Quebec, on November 1, 2009. Voters elected the mayor of Montreal, Montreal City Council, and the mayors and councils of each of the city's boroughs.

The election became plagued with allegations of corruption and mafia involvement in city contracts.

== Results ==
Despite being assailed with accusations of corruption, incumbent Mayor Gérald Tremblay led his Union Montréal party to a third victory, although with reduced standings in city council. Union's seat totals remained firm especially in the boroughs merged into the city in 2002; it retained complete control of eight boroughs and near-complete control of three more.

Vision Montréal, led by former Quebec minister of municipal affairs Louise Harel, ran a campaign targeting the mayor on ethics. However, its campaign was blindsided by a scandal involving its second-in-command and former leader Benoit Labonté, who dropped out of the race. Vision increased its council standing but was unable to defeat the mayor. It won complete control of Mercier–Hochelaga-Maisonneuve and majorities in three other borough councils.

Third party Projet Montréal increased sharply in popularity. An Angus Reid poll shortly prior to the election put its leader Richard Bergeron neck-and-neck (32%) with the two other main candidates (34% for Harel, 30% for Tremblay). He would finally come in third, but the party increased from just one seat at the previous election to ten council seats, two borough mayors, four borough councillors, and complete control of the borough of Le Plateau-Mont-Royal. Besides its main issue of public transit and urban planning, the party emphasized ethics, running its campaign on just $200,000.

=== Mayor of Montreal ===
Candidate	Party	Vote	%
Gérald Tremblay (incumbent)	Union Montréal	159,020	37.90%
Louise Harel	Vision Montréal	137,301	32.73%
Richard Bergeron	Projet Montréal	106,768	25.45%
Louise O'Sullivan	Parti Montréal - Ville-Marie	8,490	2.02%
Michel Bédard	Parti Fierté Montréal	5,297	1.26%
Michel Prairie	Independent	2,648	0.63%
Result: UM hold

=== Composition of city and borough councils ===
Depending on their borough, Montrealers voted for:

- Mayor of Montreal
- Borough mayor (except in Ville-Marie, whose mayor is the Mayor of Montreal), who is also a city councillor
- A city councillor for the whole borough or for each district, who is also a borough councillor (Outremont and L'Île-Bizard–Sainte-Geneviève have no city councillors other than the borough mayor)
- Zero, one, or two additional borough councillors for each district

Borough	District	Borough Councillors			
Borough	District	City Councillors		Borough Councillor	Borough Councillor
Borough	District	Borough Mayor	City Councillor	Borough Councillor	Borough Councillor
Ahuntsic-Cartierville	Ahuntsic	Pierre Gagnier	Émilie Thuillier		
Ahuntsic-Cartierville	Bordeaux-Cartierville	Pierre Gagnier	Harout Chitilian		
Ahuntsic-Cartierville	Saint-Sulpice	Pierre Gagnier	Jocelyn Ann Campbell		
Ahuntsic-Cartierville	Sault-au-Récollet	Pierre Gagnier	Étienne Brunet		
Anjou	Centre	Luis Miranda	Andrée Hénault	Michelle Zammit	
Anjou	East	Luis Miranda	Andrée Hénault	Paul-Yvon Perron	
Anjou	West	Luis Miranda	Andrée Hénault	Gilles Beaudry	
Côte-des-Neiges– Notre-Dame-de-Grâce	Côte-des-Neiges	Michael Appelbaum	Helen Fotopulos		
Côte-des-Neiges– Notre-Dame-de-Grâce	Darlington	Michael Appelbaum	Lionel Perez		
Côte-des-Neiges– Notre-Dame-de-Grâce	Loyola	Michael Appelbaum	Susan Clarke		
Côte-des-Neiges– Notre-Dame-de-Grâce	Notre-Dame-de-Grâce	Michael Appelbaum	Peter McQueen		
Côte-des-Neiges– Notre-Dame-de-Grâce	Snowdon	Michael Appelbaum	Marvin Rotrand		
L'Île-Bizard– Sainte-Geneviève	Denis-Benjamin-Viger	Richard Bélanger		Christopher Little	
L'Île-Bizard– Sainte-Geneviève	Jacques-Bizard	Richard Bélanger		François Robert	
L'Île-Bizard– Sainte-Geneviève	Pierre-Foretier	Richard Bélanger		Diane Gibb	
L'Île-Bizard– Sainte-Geneviève	Sainte-Geneviève	Richard Bélanger		Jacques Cardinal	
Lachine	Du Canal	Claude Dauphin	Jane Cowell-Poitras	Lise Poulin	
Lachine	Fort-Rolland	Claude Dauphin	Jane Cowell-Poitras	Jean-François Cloutier	
Lachine	J.-Émery-Provost	Claude Dauphin	Jane Cowell-Poitras	Bernard Blanchet	
LaSalle	Cecil-P.-Newman	Manon Barbe	Alvaro Farinacci	Vincenzo Cesari	Josée Troilo
LaSalle	Sault-Saint-Louis	Manon Barbe	Richard Deschamps	Ross Blackhurst	Laura-Ann Palestini
Mercier– Hochelaga-Maisonneuve	Hochelaga	Réal Ménard	Laurent Blanchard		
Mercier– Hochelaga-Maisonneuve	Louis-Riel	Réal Ménard	Lyn Thériault		
Mercier– Hochelaga-Maisonneuve	Maisonneuve–Longue-Pointe	Réal Ménard	Louise Harel		
Mercier– Hochelaga-Maisonneuve	Tétreaultville	Réal Ménard	Gaëtan Primeau		
Montréal-Nord	Marie-Clarac	Gilles Deguire	Clementina Teti-Tomassi	Chantal Rossi	
Montréal-Nord	Ovide-Clermont	Gilles Deguire	Jean-Marc Gibeau	Monica Ricourt	
Outremont	Claude-Ryan	Marie Cinq-Mars		Louis Moffatt	
Outremont	Jeanne-Sauvé	Marie Cinq-Mars		Ana Nunes	
Outremont	Joseph-Beaubien	Marie Cinq-Mars		Céline Forget	
Outremont	Robert-Bourassa	Marie Cinq-Mars		Marie Potvin	
Pierrefonds-Roxboro	East	Monique Worth	Christian Dubois	Dimitrios Jim Beis	
Pierrefonds-Roxboro	West	Monique Worth	Bertrand Ward	Catherine Clément-Talbot	
Le Plateau-Mont-Royal	DeLorimier	Luc Ferrandez	Josée Duplessis	Carl Boileau	
Le Plateau-Mont-Royal	Jeanne-Mance	Luc Ferrandez	Richard Bergeron	Piper Huggins	
Le Plateau-Mont-Royal	Mile-End	Luc Ferrandez	Alex Norris	Richard Ryan	
Rivière-des-Prairies– Pointe-aux-Trembles	La Pointe-aux-Prairies	Joe Magri	Caroline Bourgeois	Mario Blanchet	
Rivière-des-Prairies– Pointe-aux-Trembles	Pointe-aux-Trembles	Joe Magri	Suzanne Décarie	Gilles Déziel	
Rivière-des-Prairies– Pointe-aux-Trembles	Rivière-des-Prairies	Joe Magri	Maria Calderone	Giovanni Rapanà	
Rosemont– La Petite-Patrie	Étienne-Desmarteau	François Croteau	Marc-André Gadoury		
Rosemont– La Petite-Patrie	Marie-Victorin	François Croteau	Élaine Ayotte		
Rosemont– La Petite-Patrie	Saint-Édouard	François Croteau	François Limoges		
Rosemont– La Petite-Patrie	Vieux-Rosemont	François Croteau	Pierre Lampron		
Saint-Laurent	Côte-de-Liesse	Alan DeSousa	Laval Demers	Maurice Cohen	
Saint-Laurent	Norman-McLaren	Alan DeSousa	Aref Salem	Michèle Biron	
Saint-Léonard	Saint-Léonard-Est	Michel Bissonnet	Robert Zambito	Lili-Anne Tremblay	
Saint-Léonard	Saint-Léonard-Ouest	Michel Bissonnet	Dominic Perri	Mario Battista	
Le Sud-Ouest	Saint-Henri–Petite-Bourgogne– Pointe-Saint-Charles	Benoit Dorais	Véronique Fournier	Sophie Thiébaut	
Le Sud-Ouest	Saint-Paul–Émard	Benoit Dorais	Daniel Bélanger	Huguette Roy	
Verdun	Champlain–L'Île-des-Sœurs	Claude Trudel	Ginette Marotte	Paul Beaupré	Andrée Champoux
Verdun	Desmarchais-Crawford	Claude Trudel	Alain Tassé	Ann Guy	André Savard
Ville-Marie	Peter-McGill	(Mayor of Montreal)	Sammy Forcillo		
Ville-Marie	Saint-Jacques	(Mayor of Montreal)	François Robillard		
Ville-Marie	Sainte-Marie	(Mayor of Montreal)	Pierre Mainville		
Villeray–Saint-Michel– Parc-Extension	François-Perrault	Anie Samson	Frank Venneri		
Villeray–Saint-Michel– Parc-Extension	Parc-Extension	Anie Samson	Mary Deros		
Villeray–Saint-Michel– Parc-Extension	Saint-Michel	Anie Samson	Frantz Benjamin		
Villeray–Saint-Michel– Parc-Extension	Villeray	Anie Samson	Elsie Lefebvre		

== Seat-by-seat results ==
Nomination was open until October 2 at 4:30 p.m.

=== Candidate statistics ===
Party names are the official ones registered with Élection Montréal.

Party	Abbrev.	Number of candidates for			Total	Link
Party	Abbrev.	Borough mayor	City councillor	Borough councillor	Total	Link
Total positions open		18	46	38	102	
Action civique Montréal	ACM	1	2	2	5	
Ethnic Party of Montréal; Parti ethnique de Montréal	EPM	0	2	0	2	
Équipe Louise O'Sullivan - Parti Montréal - Ville-Marie	PMVM	4	21	8	33	
Parti d'Outremont	PO	0	0	3	3	
Équipe Bédard - Fierté Montréal; Team Bédard - Montreal Pride Party	MPP	0	1	0	1	
Projet Montréal	PM	18	46	38	102	
Renouveau municipal de Montréal	RMM	1	2	2	5	
Équipe Tremblay - Union Montréal	UM	18	46	38	102	
Parti Ville LaSalle	PVL	1	2	4	7	
Équipe Harel - Vision Montréal	VM	18	45	38	101	
Independents	Ind	6	17	8	31	
Total candidates		67	184	141	392	

=== Results by party ===
Party	Abbrev.	Borough mayor						City councillor						Borough councillor						Total seats					
Party	Abbrev.	Before	Held	Gained	Lost	After	Net	Before	Held	Gained	Lost	After	Net	Before	Held	Gained	Lost	After	Net	Before	Held	Gained	Lost	After	Net
Projet Montréal	PM	0	0	2	0	2	+2	1	1	7	0	8	+7	2	1	3	(1)*	4	+2	3	2	13	(1)*	14	+12
Union Montréal	UM	16	12	0	4	12	-4	36	23	3	12(+1)*	26	-10	33	27	2	6	29	-4	85	62	5	22(+1)*	67	-18
Vision Montréal	VM	3	2	2	(1)*	4	+1	6	2	10	4	12	+6	3	1	2	2	3	±0	12	5	14	6(+1)*	19	+7
Independents	Ind.	0	0	0	0	0	±0	2	0	0	2	0	-2	2	0	2	1(+1)*	2	±0	4	0	2	3(+1)*	2	-2
* = seats lost in redistricting of Ville-Marie (see below).

=== Ahuntsic-Cartierville ===
Electoral District	Eligible voters	Position	Turnout	Candidates				Incumbent	Result
Electoral District	Eligible voters	Position	Turnout	Projet Montréal	Union Montréal	Vision Montréal	Other	Incumbent	Result
—	84,532	Borough mayor	38,114; 45.09%	Pierre Gagnier; 12,760 (35.09%)	François Purcell; 11,943 (32.84%)	Zaki Ghavitian; 11,659 (32.06%)		Marie-Andrée Beaudoin	PM gain from UM
Ahuntsic	21,037	City councillor	10,532; 50.06%	Émilie Thuillier; 3,484 (34.17%)	Diane Lemieux; 3,364 (33.00%)	Frédéric Lapointe; 3,347 (32.83%)		Hasmig Belleli	PM gain from VM
Bordeaux-Cartierville	21,345	City councillor	8,439; 39.54%	Pericles Creticos; 2,040 (25.31%)	Harout Chitilian; 3,040 (37.71%)	Hasmig Belleli; 2,578 (31.98%)	John Gentile (PMVM); 403 (5.00%)	Noushig Eloyan	UM gain from VM
Saint-Sulpice	21,605	City councillor	9,074; 42.00%	Martin Bazinet; 2,546 (29.25%)	Jocelyn Ann Campbell; 3,099 (35.60%)	Jean-Jacques Lapointe; 3,060 (35.15%)		Jocelyn Ann Campbell	UM hold
Sault-au-Récollet	20,545	City councillor	10,055; 48.94%	Jean-François Desgroseilliers; 3,030 (31.35%)	Léonardo Fiore; 2,384 (24.66%)	Étienne Brunet; 3,128 (32.36%)	Giovanna Giancaspro (Ind.); 743 (7.69%); Achille Polcaro (PMVM); 381 (3.94%)	Jean-François St-Onge	VM gain from UM

=== Anjou ===
Electoral District	Eligible voters	Position	Turnout	Candidates				Incumbent	Result
Electoral District	Eligible voters	Position	Turnout	Projet Montréal	Union Montréal	Vision Montréal	Other	Incumbent	Result
—	29,753	Borough mayor	13,867; 46.61%	Philippe Duval; 2,020 (15.10%)	Luis Miranda; 7,403 (55.32%)	Lynda Côté; 3,958 (29.58%)		Luis Miranda	UM hold
—	29,753	City councillor	13,902; 46.72%	Yves Laporte; 2,284 (17.19%)	Andrée Hénault; 6,781 (51.03%)	Danielle Boulet; 4,223 (31.78%)		Andrée Hénault	UM hold
Centre	11,083	Borough councillor	5,329; 48.08%	Slimane Bah; 857 (16.88%)	Michelle Zammit; 2,722 (53.60%)	Badiona Bazin; 1,499 (29.52%)		Michelle Zammit	UM hold
East	8,896	Borough councillor	4,062; 45.66%	Julien Viel; 656 (16.90%)	Paul-Yvon Perron; 1,746 (44.99%)	Rémy Tondreau; 1,479 (38.11%)		Rémy Tondreau	UM gain from VM
West	9,774	Borough councillor	4,488; 45,92%	Alexis Rochon; 812 (18.92%)	Gilles Beaudry; 2,342 (54.58%)	Souad Bounakhla; 1,137 (26.50%)		Gilles Beaudry	UM hold

=== Côte-des-Neiges–Notre-Dame-de-Grâce ===
Electoral District	Eligible voters	Position	Turnout	Candidates				Incumbent	Result
Electoral District	Eligible voters	Position	Turnout	Projet Montréal	Union Montréal	Vision Montréal	Other	Incumbent	Result
—	95,431	Borough mayor	34,441; 36.09%	Carole Dupuis; 8,678 (26.01%)	Michael Applebaum; 17,409 (52.19%)	Brenda Mae Paris; 5,686 (17.04%)	Jacqueline Sommereyns (PMVM); 1,586 (4.75%)	Michael Applebaum	UM hold
Côte-des-Neiges	16,773	City councillor	6,434; 38.36%	Magda Popeanu; 2,111 (33.81%)	Helen Fotopulos; Co-candidate for Gérald Tremblay; 2,607 (41.75%)	Amelia Salehabadi; 1,382 (22.13%)	Ziyad Almbasher (PMVM); 144 (2.31%)	Francine Sénécal	UM hold
Darlington	17,474	City councillor	5,584; 31.96%	Kamala Jegatheeswaran; 1,137 (21.42%)	Lionel Perez; 2,322 (43.74%)	Keeton Clarke; 798 (15.03%)	Francine Brodeur (PMVM); 435 (8.19%); Marlon Quintos (Ind.); 312 (5.88%); Alex Robles (Ind.); 305 (5.74%)	Saulie Zajdel	UM hold
Loyola	21,962	City councillor	7,740; 35.24%	Cymry Jean Gomery; 1,476 (19.47%)	Susan Clarke; 2,525 (33.31%)	Hubert Gallet; 566 (7.47%)	Jeremy Searle (Ind.); 2,270 (29.94%); George Pentsos (PMVM); 744 (9.81%)	Warren Allmand	UM hold
Notre-Dame-de-Grâce	20,561	City councillor	8,400; 40.85%	Peter McQueen; 3,441 (41.82%)	Marie-José Mastromonaco; 2,654 (32.26%)	David Hanna; 1,811 (22.01%)	David Riachi (PMVM); 177 (2.15%); Philippe Godley (Ind.); 145 (1.76%)	Marcel Tremblay	PM gain from UM
Snowdon	18,661	City councillor	6,240; 33.44%	Daniel Grenon; 1,064 (17.79%)	Marvin Rotrand; 3,578 (59.82%)	Frédéric Tremblay; 939 (15.70%)	Carmen Dan (PMVM); 400 (6.69%)	Marvin Rotrand	UM hold

=== L'Île-Bizard–Sainte-Geneviève ===
Electoral District	Eligible voters	Position	Turnout	Candidates				Incumbent	Result
Electoral District	Eligible voters	Position	Turnout	Projet Montréal	Union Montréal	Vision Montréal	Other	Incumbent	Result
—	13,150	Borough mayor	5,327; 40.51%	Luc Charlebois; 925 (17.95%)	Richard Bélanger; 2,881 (55.91%)	René Gervais; 1,168 (22.67%)	Nadia Vilmé (PMVM); 179 (3.47%); ~~Christian Prevost (Ind)~~; Candidacy withdrawn	Richard Bélanger	UM hold
Denis-Benjamin-Viger	3,826	Borough councillor	1,635; 42.73%	Gordon Craig; 170 (10.71%)	Christopher Little; 692 (43.58%)	Raymond Legault; 254 (15.99%)	Christian Larocque (Ind.); 472 (29.72%)	Christopher Little	UM hold
Jacques-Bizard	3,044	Borough councillor	1,255; 41.23%	Jean-Dominic Lévesque-René; 323 (27.23%)	François Robert; 538 (45.36%)	Pascal Marchi; 325 (27.40%)		François Robert	UM hold
Pierre-Foretier	3,696	Borough councillor	1,566; 42.37%	Daniel Dulude; 309 (20.21%)	Diane Gibb; 816 (53.37%)	Denis Lessard; 404 (26.42%)		Diane Gibb	UM hold
Sainte-Geneviève	2,584	Borough councillor	877; 33.94%	Henri Malmström; 43 (5.05%)	Philippe Voisard; 344 (40.38%)	Éric Boissé; 65 (7.63%)	Jacques Cardinal (Ind.); 400 (46.95%)	Philippe Voisard	Ind. gain from UM

=== Lachine ===
Electoral District	Eligible voters	Position	Turnout	Candidates				Incumbent	Result
Electoral District	Eligible voters	Position	Turnout	Projet Montréal	Union Montréal	Vision Montréal	Other	Incumbent	Result
—	30,441	Borough mayor	12,044; 39.57%	Gilles Lortie; 2,040 (17.45%)	Claude Dauphin; 7,407 (63.37%)	Carolina Caruso; 2,242 (19.18%)		Claude Dauphin	UM hold
—	30,441	City councillor	12 033; 39.53%	Daniel Racicot; 2,589 (22.28%)	Jane Cowell-Poitras; 6,839 (58.86%)	Zhao Xin Wu; 2,191 (18.86%)		Jane Cowell-Poitras	UM hold
Du Canal	9,905	Borough councillor	3,558; 35.92%	John Symon; 560 (16.38%)	Lise Poulin; 1,485 (43.45%)	Robert Monaco; 727 (21.27%)	Robert Farineau (Ind.); 499 (14.60%); Mario Lavigne (Ind.); 147 (4.30%)	Elizabeth Verge	UM hold
Fort-Rolland	10,360	Borough councillor	4,937; 47.65%	Jody Anne Negley; 1,036 (21.67%)	Jean-François Cloutier; 2,765 (57.85%)	Claude de Lanauze; 979 (20.48%)		Jean-François Cloutier	UM hold
J.-Émery-Provost	10,176	Borough councillor	3,539; 34.78%	Marc-André Rivest; 572 (16.74%)	Bernard Blanchet; 2,221 (65.00%)	Raymond Dufort; 624 (18.26%)		Bernard Blanchet	UM hold

=== LaSalle ===
Electoral District	Eligible voters	Position	Turnout	Candidates				Incumbent	Result
Electoral District	Eligible voters	Position	Turnout	Projet Montréal	Union Montréal	Vision Montréal	Other	Incumbent	Result
—	51,861	Borough mayor	19,848; 38.27%	Olivier Lafontaine; 2,151 (11.31%)	Manon Barbe; 9,359 (49.19%)	Michael Vadacchino; 5,133 (26.98%)	Oksana Kaluzny (PVL); 2,383 (12.52%)	Manon Barbe	UM hold
Cecil-P.-Newman	26,280	City councillor	9,341; 35.54%	Dominique Matte; 1,154 (13.01%)	Alvaro Farinacci; 4,077 (45.97%)	Carlo Mannarino; 2,113 (23.83%)	Francisco Moreno (PVL); 1,195 (13.48%); Saroj Kumar Dash (PMVM); 329 (3.71%)	Alvaro Farinacci	UM hold
Cecil-P.-Newman	26,280	Borough councillor I	9,340; 35.54%	Livia James; 1,109 (12.65%)	Vincenzo Cesari; 4,145 (47.30%)	Enrico Pace; 2,150 (24.53%)	Giovanni Butterin (PVL); 1,360 (15.52%)	Vincenzo Cesari	UM hold
Cecil-P.-Newman	26,280	Borough councillor II	9,333; 35.51%	Julien Demers; 977 (11.11%)	Josée Troilo; 3,692 (41.99%)	Jocelyne Bénard; 1,948 (22.16%)	Mario Orlando (PVL); 1,471 (16.73%); Vas Karkavilas (PMVM); 704 (8.01%)	Michael Vadacchino	UM gain from VM
Sault-Saint-Louis	25,581	City councillor	10,607; 41.46%	Frédéric Demers; 1,318 (12.96%)	Richard Deschamps; 4,835 (47.55%)	Pierre Lussier; 2,489 (24.48%)	Éric Tremblay (PVL); 1,113 (10.95%); Cécile Duhamel (PMVM); 414 (4.07%)	Richard Deschamps	UM hold
Sault-Saint-Louis	25,581	Borough councillor I	10,631; 41.56%	Gregory Abel; 1,217 (11.97%)	Ross Blackhurst; 5,019 (49.38%)	Yves Desparois; 2,495 (24.55%)	Mariya Pasternak (PVL); 1,042 (10.25%); Gerald Wityshyn (PMVM); 391 (3.85%)	Ross Blackhurst	UM hold
Sault-Saint-Louis	25,581	Borough councillor II	10,615; 41.50%	Benoît Couturier; 1,357 (13.45%)	Laura-Ann Palestini; 4,571 (45.30%)	Gilbert Vachon; 2,770 (27.45%)	Devon Wyre (PVL); 920 (9.12%); Lise Furlatt (PMVM); 472 (4.68%)	Laura Palestini	UM hold

=== Mercier–Hochelaga-Maisonneuve ===
Electoral District	Eligible voters	Position	Turnout	Candidates				Incumbent	Result
Electoral District	Eligible voters	Position	Turnout	Projet Montréal	Union Montréal	Vision Montréal	Other	Incumbent	Result
—	96,244	Borough mayor	39,531; 41.07%	Ann Julie Fortier; 9,640 (25.19%)	Claire St-Arnaud; 8,528 (22.28%)	Réal Ménard; 20,103 (52.53%)		Lyn Thériault	VM hold
Hochelaga	23,817	City councillor	8,949; 37.57%	Éric Alan Caldwell; 2,560 (29.57%)	Louis Cléroux; 1,131 (13.07%)	Laurent Blanchard; 4,965 (57.36%)		Laurent Blanchard	VM hold
Louis-Riel	22,743	City councillor	9,804; 43.11%	Michel Bouchard; 2,437 (25.73%)	Richer Dompierre; 2,926 (30.89%)	Lyn Thériault; 3,784 (39.95%)	Steve Lamer (Ind.); 255 (2.69%); Kristian-Andrew Solarik (Ind.); 69 (0.73%)	Richer Dompierre	VM gain from UM
Maisonneuve–Longue-Pointe	24,752	City councillor	10,070; 40.68%	Carl Bégin; 2,569 (26.28%)	Christian Giguère; 1,966 (20.11%)	Monique Comtois-Blanchet; Co-candidate for Louise Harel; 5,239 (53.60%)		Claire St-Arnaud	VM gain from UM
Tétreaultville	24,932	City councillor	10,748; 43.11%	Suzie Miron; 3,196 (30.79%)	Serge Malaison; 2,414 (23.26%)	Gaëtan Primeau; 4,770 (45.95%)		Gaëtan Primeau	VM hold

=== Montréal-Nord ===
Electoral District	Eligible voters	Position	Turnout	Candidates				Incumbent	Result
Electoral District	Eligible voters	Position	Turnout	Projet Montréal	Union Montréal	Vision Montréal	Other	Incumbent	Result
—	53,098	Borough mayor	17,762; 33.45%	Ronald Boisrond; 2,438 (14.55%)	Gilles Deguire; 6,784 (40.50%)	Daniel Renaud; 4,317 (25.77%)	Michelle Allaire (RMM); 3,213 (19.18%)	Marcel Parent	UM hold
Marie-Clarac	27,807	City councillor	9,529; 34.27%	Hugues Surprenant; 1,456 (16.13%)	Clementina Teti-Tomassi; 3,410 (37.77%)	Marc L. Fortin; 2,817 (31.20%)	Louis Pelletier (RMM); 1,345 (14.90%)	James Infantino	UM hold
Marie-Clarac	27,807	Borough councillor	9,506; 34.19%	Saïd Ghoulimi; 1,256 (13.96%)	Chantal Rossi; 3,506 (38.96%)	Roland Carrier; 2,824 (31.38%)	Jeannette Belisle (RMM); 1,413 (15.70%)	Clementina Teti-Tomassi	UM hold
Ovide-Clermont	25,291	City councillor	8,162; 32.27%	Judith Houedjissin; 920 (11.96%)	Jean-Marc Gibeau; 3,787 (49.21%)	Brunilda Reyes; 2,035 (26.45%)	Réjean Loyer (RMM); 953 (12.38%)	Jean-Marc Gibeau	UM hold
Ovide-Clermont	25,291	Borough councillor	8,175; 32.32%	Nicolas Bergeron; 1,140 (14.89%)	Monica Ricourt; 3,313 (43.28%)	Guerline Rigaud; 2,020 (26.39%)	Lynn Boulerice (RMM); 993 (12.97%); Henri-Paul Bernier (Ind.); 189 (2.47%)	Normand Fortin	UM hold

=== Outremont ===
Electoral District	Eligible voters	Position	Turnout	Candidates				Incumbent	Result
Electoral District	Eligible voters	Position	Turnout	Projet Montréal	Union Montréal	Vision Montréal	Other	Incumbent	Result
—	15,431	Borough mayor	8,480; 54.95%	Étienne Coutu; 1,990 (24.04%)	Marie Cinq-Mars; 3,803 (45.95%)	Paul-André Tétreault; 2,484 (30.01%)		Marie Cinq-Mars	UM hold
Claude-Ryan	4,108	Borough councillor	2,070; 50.39%	Mylène Freeman; 305 (15.02%)	Louis Moffatt; 912 (44.90%)	Duncan Robert Seebold; 362 (17.82%)	Jean de Julio-Paquin (PO); 452 (22.26%)	Louis Moffatt	UM hold
Jeanne-Sauvé	3,654	Borough councillor	2,061; 56.40%	Jérôme Bugel; 419 (20.97%)	Ana Nunes; 654 (32.73%)	Marc Vanier Vincent; 527 (26.38%)	Pierre Simard (PO); 398 (19.92%)	Ana Nunes	UM hold
Joseph-Beaubien	4,207	Borough councillor	2,452; 58.28%	Denisa Baranceanu; 380 (15.75%)	Claude B. Piquette; 666 (27.60%)	Louise Gagné; 597 (24.74%)	Céline Forget (Ind.); 770 (31.91%)	Claude B. Piquette	Ind. gain from UM
Robert-Bourassa	3,462	Borough councillor	1,899; 54.85%	Angèle Richer; 296 (15.90%)	Marie Potvin; 785 (42.16%)	Alain Tittley; 501 (26.91%)	Jean Girouard (PO); 280 (15.04%)	Marie Potvin	UM hold

=== Pierrefonds-Roxboro ===
Electoral District	Eligible voters	Position	Turnout	Candidates				Incumbent	Result
Electoral District	Eligible voters	Position	Turnout	Projet Montréal	Union Montréal	Vision Montréal	Other	Incumbent	Result
—	45,454	Borough mayor	13,654; 30.04%	Michael Labelle; 4,483 (33.77%)	Monique Worth; 7,065 (53.22%)	Latif Zaki; 1,728 (13.02%)		Monique Worth	UM hold
East	24,127	City councillor	7,464; 30.94%	Miguel Roman; 2,188 (30.35%)	Christian G. Dubois; 3,722 (51.63%)	Mustapha Kachani; 1,299 (18.02%)		Christian G. Dubois	UM hold
East	24,127	Borough councillor	7,477; 30.99%	Eva Salem Nakouzi; 1,913 (26.56%)	Dimitrios Jim Beis; 3,585 (49.77%)	Nathalie Morin; 1,705 (23.67%)		Roger Trottier	UM hold
West	21,327	City councillor	6,196; 29.05%	Eric McCarty; 1,941 (32.23%)	Bertrand A. Ward; 3,264 (54.20%)	Olivier Manceau; 817 (13.57%)		Bertrand A. Ward	UM hold
West	21,327	Borough councillor	6,197; 29.06%	Lisa Ann Cardi; 1,940 (32.29%)	Catherine Clément-Talbot; 3,260 (54.26%)	Alexandre Pagé-Chassé; 808 (13.45%)		Catherine Clément-Talbot	UM hold

=== Le Plateau-Mont-Royal ===
Electoral District	Eligible voters	Position	Turnout	Candidates				Incumbent	Result
Electoral District	Eligible voters	Position	Turnout	Projet Montréal	Union Montréal	Vision Montréal	Other	Incumbent	Result
—	66,556	Borough mayor	28,920; 43.45%	Luc Ferrandez; 12,541 (44.76%)	Michel Labrecque; 7,274 (25.96%)	Guillaume Vaillancourt; 7,620 (27.20%)	Jean-François Larose (PMVM); 582 (2.08%)	Helen Fotopulos	PM gain from UM
DeLorimier	23,602	City councillor	11,238; 47.61%	Josée Duplessis; 5,403 (49.51%)	Constance Ramacieri; 1,391 (12.75%)	Martine Hébert; 3,907 (35.80%)	Antoine Bilodeau (PMVM); 211 (1.93%)	Richard Bergeron	PM hold
DeLorimier	23,602	Borough councillor	11,237; 47.61%	Carl Boileau; 5,242 (48.12%)	Marc-Nicolas Kobrynsky; 1,484 (13.62%)	Christine Fréchette; 4,168 (38.26%)		Josée Duplessis	PM hold
Jeanne-Mance	21,235	City councillor	8,401; 39.56%	Nimâ Machouf; Co-candidate for Richard Bergeron; 3,271 (39.90%)	Michel Prescott; 1,806 (22.03%)	Nathalie Rochefort; 2,404 (29.32%)	Marc-Boris St-Maurice (Ind.); 548 (6.68%); Marc-André Bahl (PMVM); 170 (2.07%)	Michel Prescott	PM gain from UM
Jeanne-Mance	21,235	Borough councillor	8,405; 39,58%	Piper Huggins; 3,457 (42.57%)	Isabel Dos Santos; 2,719 (33.48%)	Jennifer-Lee Barker; 1,945 (23.95%)		Isabel Dos Santos	PM gain from UM
Mile End	21,719	City councillor	9,251; 42.59%	Alex Norris; 4,262 (47.51%)	Robert Pilon; 1,885 (21.01%)	Pierre Marquis; 2,552 (28.45%)	Juliana Contreras (PMVM); 272 (3.03%)	Michel Labrecque	PM gain from UM
Mile End	21,719	Borough councillor	9,253 (42.60%	Richard Ryan; 4,349 (48.52%)	Eleni Fakotakis-Kolaitis; 2,059 (22.97%)	Michel Pauzé; 2,555 (28.51%)		Eleni Fakotakis-Kolaitis	PM gain from UM

=== Rivière-des-Prairies–Pointe-aux-Trembles ===
Electoral District	Eligible voters	Position	Turnout	Candidates				Incumbent	Result
Electoral District	Eligible voters	Position	Turnout	Projet Montréal	Union Montréal	Vision Montréal	Other	Incumbent	Result
—	77,592	Borough mayor	30,964; 39.91%	Thérèse Deschambault; 5,845 (19.69%)	Joe Magri; 12,250 (41.27%)	Chantal Rouleau; 10,770 (36.28%)	Michel Daoust (Ind.); 817 (2.75%)	Cosmo Maciocia	UM hold
La Pointe-aux-Prairies	28,255	City councillor		Suzanne Morin	Marco Veilleux	Caroline Bourgeois		Nicolas Montmorency	VM gain from Ind.
La Pointe-aux-Prairies	28,255	Borough councillor		Guillaume Raymond	Joseph Di Pietro	Mario Blanchet		Joseph Di Pietro	VM gain from UM
Pointe-aux-Trembles	24,747	City councillor		Marius Minier	André Bélisle	Suzanne Décarie	Gérald Briand (Ind)	André Bélisle	VM gain from UM
Pointe-aux-Trembles	24,747	Borough councillor		Carine Bernier	Stéphane Robitaille	Gilles Déziel		Suzanne Décarie	VM hold
Rivière-des-Prairies	24,590	City councillor		Carole Leroux	Maria Calderone	Gennaro Bartoli		Joe Magri	UM hold
Rivière-des-Prairies	24,590	Borough councillor		Sylvain Girard	Giovanni Rapanà	Francesco Ierfino		Maria Calderone	UM hold

=== Rosemont–La Petite-Patrie ===
Electoral District	Eligible voters	Position	Turnout	Candidates				Incumbent	Result
Electoral District	Eligible voters	Position	Turnout	Projet Montréal	Union Montréal	Vision Montréal	Other	Incumbent	Result
—	96,802	Borough mayor	43,900; 45.35%	Patrick Cigana; 13,902 (32.74%)	André Lavallée; 13,477 (31.74%)	François Croteau; 15,077 (35.51%)		André Lavallée	VM gain from UM
Étienne-Desmarteau	23,834	City councillor	11,323; 47.51%	Marc-André Gadoury; 4,295 (39.17%)	Carole Du Sault; 2,515 (22.94%)	Rémy Trudel; 4,154 (37.89%)		Carole Du Sault	PM gain from UM
Marie-Victorin	23,106	City councillor	10,511; 45.49%	Michel Desmarais; 2,363 (23.41%)	Carle Bernier-Genest; 3,147 (31.18%)	Élaine Ayotte; 4,584 (45.41%)		Carle Bernier-Genest	VM gain from UM
Saint-Édouard	24,500	City councillor	10,675; 43.57%	François Limoges; 4,816 (46.52%)	Nicole McNeil; 2,045 (19.75%)	Atïm Leon; 3,206 (30.97%)	Francine Faucher (PMVM); 285 (2.75%)	François Purcell	PM gain from UM
Vieux-Rosemont	25,362	City councillor	11,407; 44.98%	Christine Gosselin; 3,736 (33.87%)	Gilles Grondin; 2,620 (23.75%)	Pierre Lampron; 4,674 (42.38%)		Gilles Grondin	VM gain from UM

=== Saint-Laurent ===
Electoral District	Eligible voters	Position	Turnout	Candidates				Incumbent	Result
Electoral District	Eligible voters	Position	Turnout	Projet Montréal	Union Montréal	Vision Montréal	Other	Incumbent	Result
—	56,747	Borough mayor	18,767; 33.07%	Fouad Zerhouni; 2,486 (13.72%)	Alan DeSousa; 13,206 (72.89%)	Sergio Borja; 2,426 (13.39%)		Alan DeSousa	UM hold
Côte-de-Liesse	29,030	City councillor	9,298; 32.03%	Carole Laberge; 1,415 (15.71%)	Laval Demers; 5,793 (64.33%)	Sonia Fragapane; 1,230 (13.66%)	Bryce Durafourt (Ind.); 567 (6.30%)	Laval Demers	UM hold
Côte-de-Liesse	29,030	Borough councillor	9,328; 32.13%	Frances Kotar; 1,493 (16.48%)	Maurice Cohen; 6,086 (67.20%)	Guillaume Benoit-Gagné; 1,478 (16.32%)		Maurice Cohen	UM hold
Norman-McLaren	27,717	City councillor	9,469; 34.16%	Mohammed Benzaria; 1,505 (16.70%)	Aref Salem; 5,166 (57.32%)	Joan Adams; 1,822 (20.22%)	Alain Ackad (PMVM); 520 (5.77%)	Patricia Bittar	UM hold
Norman-McLaren	27,717	Borough councillor	9,441; 34.06%	Léonard Langlois; 1,771 (19.73%)	Michèle D. Biron; 5,590 (62.28%)	Nezar Hammoud; 1,614 (17.98%)		Michèle Biron	UM hold

=== Saint-Léonard ===
Electoral District	Eligible voters	Position	Turnout	Candidates				Incumbent	Result
Electoral District	Eligible voters	Position	Turnout	Projet Montréal	Union Montréal	Vision Montréal	Other	Incumbent	Result
—	48,325	Borough mayor	18,803; 38.91%	Nicolas Marchildon; 1,325 (7.42%)	Michel Bissonnet; 12,449 (69.72%)	Vittorio Capparelli; 2,035 (11.40%)	Italo Barone (ACM) 1,868 (10.46%); David Mallozzi (Ind) 179 (1.00%)	Michel Bissonnet	UM hold
Saint-Léonard-Est	21,159	City councillor	8,294; 39.20%	Franco Fiori; 947 (12.21%)	Robert L. Zambito; 4,928 (63.51%)	Raphaël Fortin; 1,135 (14.63%)	Louise Blackburn (ACM); 749 (9.65%)	Yvette Bissonnet	UM hold
Saint-Léonard-Est	21,159	Borough councillor	8,270; 39.09%	Martin Surprenant; 830 (10.84%)	Lili-Anne Tremblay; 4,429 (57.86%)	Marie-Lourdes Louis; 1,162 (15.18%)	Domenico Moschella (ACM); 1,234 (16.12%)	Robert L. Zambito	UM hold
Saint-Léonard-Ouest	27,166	City councillor	10,487; 38.60%	Souad El Haous; 773 (7.90%)	Dominic Perri; 6,524 (66.69%)	Najat Boughaba; 1,330 (13.60%)	Rocco De Robertis (ACM); 1,155 (11.81%)	Dominic Perri	UM hold
Saint-Léonard-Ouest	27,166	Borough councillor	10,500; 38.65%	Martin Lavallée; 1,095 (11.09%)	Mario Battista; 6,653 (67.39%)	Carmelo De Stefano; 1,408 (14.26%)	Luis Ruivo (ACM); 717 (7.26%)	Mario Battista	UM hold

=== Le Sud-Ouest ===
Electoral District	Eligible voters	Position	Turnout	Candidates				Incumbent	Result
Electoral District	Eligible voters	Position	Turnout	Projet Montréal	Union Montréal	Vision Montréal	Other	Incumbent	Result
—	49,148	Borough mayor	17,853; 36.32%	Mudi Wa Mbuji Kabeya; 3,275 (19.24%)	Nicole Boudreau; 4,798 (28.19%)	Benoit Dorais; 4,826 (28.35%)	Line Hamel (Ind.); 3,586 (21.07%); Camillien Delisle (Ind.); 537 (3.15%)	Jacqueline Montpetit	VM gain from UM
Saint-Henri–Petite-Bourgogne–Pointe-Saint-Charles	27,189	City councillor	9,323; 34.29%	Steeve Lemay; 2,524 (28.27%)	Pierre Fréchette; 2,538 (28.43%)	Véronique Fournier; 2,695 (30.19%)	Sylvain Patry (Ind.); 792 (8.87%); Michel Fortin (Ind.); 378 (4.23%)	Line Hamel	VM gain from Ind.
Saint-Henri–Petite-Bourgogne–Pointe-Saint-Charles	27,189	Borough councillor	9,385; 34.52%	Sophie Thiébaut; 2,765 (30.92%)	Danielle Godbout; 2,444 (27.33%)	Paul-Émile Rioux; 2,524 (28.23%)	Émilie Bordat (Ind.); 645 (7.21%); Sean Murphy (PMVM); 564 (6.31%)	Pierre E. Fréchette	PM gain from UM
Saint-Paul–Émard	21,959	City councillor	8,543; 38.90%	Marie-Pascale Deegan; 1,949 (24.27%)	Daniel Bélanger; 3,063 (38.14%)	Benjamin Cartier; 3,018 (37.58%)		Jean-Yves Cartier	UM gain from VM
Saint-Paul–Émard	21,959	Borough councillor	8,558; 38.97%	Hélène Leblanc; 1,744 (21.52%)	Diane Robitaille Pignoloni; 2,494 (30.78%)	Huguette Roy; 2,574 (31.77%)	Ronald Bossy (Ind.); 1,291 (15.93%)	Ronald Bossy	VM gain from Ind.

=== Verdun ===
Electoral District	Eligible voters	Position	Turnout	Candidates				Incumbent	Result
Electoral District	Eligible voters	Position	Turnout	Projet Montréal	Union Montréal	Vision Montréal	Other	Incumbent	Result
—	47,141	Borough mayor	18,073; 38.34%	Yannick Brosseau; 3,892 (22.22%)	Claude Trudel; 6,993 (39.92%)	Richard Langlais; 5,578 (31.84%)	Pierre Labrosse (PMVM); 1,055 (6.02%)	Claude Trudel	UM hold
Champlain– L'Île-des-Sœurs	24,618	City councillor	9,721; 39.49%	Alain Fredet; 2,160 (22.99%)	Ginette Marotte; 3,430 (36.51%)	Catherine Chauvin; 3,289 (35.01%)	Denise Larouche (PMVM); 516 (5.49%)	Ginette Marotte	UM hold
Champlain– L'Île-des-Sœurs	24,618	Borough councillor I	9,721; 39.49%	Mathieu Lutfy; 2,250 (24.11%)	Paul Beaupré; 3,455 (37.02%)	André Julien; 3,070 (32.89%)	Rickie Richard (PMVM); 559 (5.99%)	Paul Beaupré	UM hold
Champlain– L'Île-des-Sœurs	24,618	Borough councillor II	9,716; 39.47%	Ken McLaughlin; 2,180 (23.28%)	Andrée Champoux; 3,308 (35.32%)	Pierre L'Heureux; 3,270 (34.92%)	Pierre Rousseau (PMVM); 607 (6.48%)	Marc Touchette	UM hold
Desmarchais-Crawford	22,523	City councillor	8,334; 37.00%	Mathieu Boisvert; 1,901 (23.61%)	Alain Tassé; 3,115 (38.69%)	Antoine Richard; 2,429 (30.17%)	Jeannette Lafrance (PMVM); 606 (7.53%)	Alain Tassé	UM hold
Desmarchais-Crawford	22,523	Borough councillor I	8,351; 37.08%	Xavier Mondor; 1,837 (22.84%)	Ann Guy; 2,922 (36.33%)	Jean-François Parenteau; 2,784 (34.61%)	Diane Schinck (PMVM); 501 (6.23%)	Josée Lavigueur Thériault	UM hold
Desmarchais-Crawford	22,523	Borough councillor II	8,350; 37.07%	Beatriz Guarin; 1,752 (21.72%)	André Savard; 3,234 (40.09%)	Michelle Tremblay; 2,691 (33.36%)	Robert Couturier (PMVM); 390 (4.83%)	André Savard	UM hold

=== Ville-Marie ===
Electoral District	Eligible voters	Position	Turnout	Candidates				Incumbent	Result
Electoral District	Eligible voters	Position	Turnout	Projet Montréal	Union Montréal	Vision Montréal	Other	Incumbent	Result
—	n/a	Borough mayor	Elected position abolished (Mayor of Montreal serves as borough mayor)					Benoit Labonté	VM loss to redistricting
Peter-McGill	18,201	City councillor	5,179; 28.45%	David-Roger Gagnon; 701 (13.77%)	Sammy Forcillo; 1,951 (38.33%)	Denise Dussault; 618 (12.14%)	Karim Boulos (Ind.): 1,239 (24.34%); Fergus Keyes (PMVM) — Co-candidate for Louise O'Sullivan: 529 (10.39%); Martin Boyer (Ind.): 52 (1.02%)	Catherine Sévigny	UM hold
Peter-McGill	n/a	Borough councillor	Position abolished					Karim Boulos	Ind. loss to redistricting
Saint-Jacques	20,750	City councillor	7,806; 37.62%	Siou Fan Houang; 2,237 (29.48%)	Catherine Sévigny; 1,965 (25.90%)	François Robillard; 3,127 (41.21%)	Gérald Yane (PMVM); 259 (3.41%)	Position created	VM gain
Sainte-Marie	15,761	City councillor	6,245; 39.62%	Pierre Mainville; 3,689 (64.94%)	Yves Pelletier; 1,144 (20.14%)	~~Benoit Labonté~~; Candidacy withdrawn	Milan Mirich (MPP) — Co-candidate for Michel Bédard: 344 (6.06%); Frederic Rappaz (Ind.): 259 (4.56%); Rim Zid (PMVM): 245 (4.31%)	Position created	PM gain
Sainte-Marie–Saint-Jacques	n/a	City councillor	Position abolished					Sammy Forcillo	UM loss to redistricting
Sainte-Marie–Saint-Jacques	n/a	Borough councillor	Position abolished					Pierre Mainville	PM loss to redistricting

=== Villeray–Saint-Michel–Parc-Extension ===
Electoral District	Eligible voters	Position	Turnout	Candidates				Incumbent	Result
Electoral District	Eligible voters	Position	Turnout	Projet Montréal	Union Montréal	Vision Montréal	Other	Incumbent	Result
—	87,788	Borough mayor	33,926; 38.65%	Nicolas Thibodeau; 7,452 (23.06%)	Marcel Tremblay; 10,709 (33.14%)	Anie Samson; 12,800 (39.61%)	Beverly Bernardo (Ind.); 705 (2.18%); Jacques Brisebois (Ind.); 653 (2.02%)	Anie Samson	VM hold
François-Perrault	22,228	City councillor	8,332; 37.48%	Marie-Josée Beauchamp; 2,219 (27.97%)	Frank Venneri; 2,877 (36.26%)	Harry Delva; 2,556 (32.22%)	Guillaume Blouin-Beaudoin (Ind.); 282 (3.55%)	Frank Venneri	UM hold
Parc-Extension	19,913	City councillor	7,166; 35.99%	Bernarda Klatt; 899 (13.11%)	Mary Deros; 3,476 (50.69%)	Costa Zafiropoulos; 1,608 (23.45%)	George Lemontzoglou (EPM); 534 (7.79%); Moshfiqur Rahman Khan (Ind.); 215 (3.14%); Sorin Vasile Iftode (PMVM); 126 (1.84%)	Mary Deros	UM hold
Saint-Michel	21,770	City councillor	7,111; 32.66%	Jack Thierry Morency; 891 (13.35%)	Frantz Benjamin; 2,898 (43.41%)	Soraya Martinez; 2,478 (37.12%)	Valentino Nelson (PMVM); 409 (6.13%)	Soraya Martinez	UM gain from VM
Villeray	23,877	City councillor	11,301; 47,33%	Éric Daoust; 2,936 (26.69%)	Sylvain Lachance; 1,895 (17.23%)	Elsie Lefebvre; 5,972 (54.29%)	Luis Corcuera (EPM); 198 (1.80%)	Sylvain Lachance	VM gain from UM
