= Renouveau municipal de Montréal =

Political party in Quebec, Canada

The Renouveau municipal de Montréal (RMM) was a political party in Montreal, Quebec, Canada, that contested seats in the Montréal-Nord borough in the 2009 Montreal municipal election.

== Party leader ==
The RMM's leader was Michelle Allaire, a chartered accountant and accounting and finance teacher at the Université du Québec à Montréal. Her campaign literature indicates that she has a Master of Business Administration degree from HEC Montréal. In 2009, she said the RMM would work to restore Montreal-Nord's image and develop work programs for area youth.

Allaire had previously served as a city councillor in Montréal-Nord from 1986 to 2001 as a member of mayor Yves Ryan's political party, the similarly named Renouveau municipal. Montréal-Nord became part of the newly amalgamated city of Montreal in 2001; Allaire ran for a seat on the Montreal city council as a Vision Montreal candidate in that year's municipal election but was narrowly defeated. She subsequently ran for the Action démocratique du Québec in the 2003 provincial election and for the Conservative Party of Canada in the 2008 federal election.

Allaire originally planned to run for Montréal-Nord borough mayor in the 2009 election as a candidate of Louise O'Sullivan's Parti Montréal Ville-Marie, but she instead chose to launch a separate party.

== Party election results in 2009 ==
Along with Allaire's campaign for borough mayor, the RMM fielded candidates for Montréal-Nord's two city council and two borough council seats. The party received a total of 7,917 votes, and none of its candidates were elected. The RMM seems to have disappeared after this time; it did not run any candidates in the 2013 municipal election, in which Allaire ran for city council as a Coalition Montréal candidate in Marie-Clarac.

The party's full results from 2009 are as follows:

Electoral District	Eligible voters	Position	Turnout	Candidates				Incumbent	Result
Electoral District	Eligible voters	Position	Turnout	Projet Montréal	Union Montréal	Vision Montréal	Other	Incumbent	Result
—	53,098	Borough mayor	17,762; 33.45%	Ronald Boisrond; 2,438 (14.55%)	Gilles Deguire; 6,784 (40.50%)	Daniel Renaud; 4,317 (25.77%)	Michelle Allaire (RMM); 3,213 (19.18%)	Marcel Parent	UM hold
Marie-Clarac	27,807	City councillor	9,529; 34.27%	Hugues Surprenant; 1,456 (16.13%)	Clementina Teti-Tomassi; 3,410 (37.77%)	Marc L. Fortin; 2,817 (31.20%)	Louis Pelletier (RMM); 1,345 (14.90%)	James Infantino	UM hold
Marie-Clarac	27,807	Borough councillor	9,506; 34.19%	Saïd Ghoulimi; 1,256 (13.96%)	Chantal Rossi; 3,506 (38.96%)	Roland Carrier; 2,824 (31.38%)	Jeannette Belisle (RMM); 1,413 (15.70%)	Clementina Teti-Tomassi	UM hold
Ovide-Clermont	25,291	City councillor	8,162; 32.27%	Judith Houedjissin; 920 (11.96%)	Jean-Marc Gibeau; 3,787 (49.21%)	Brunilda Reyes; 2,035 (26.45%)	Réjean Loyer (RMM); 953 (12.38%)	Jean-Marc Gibeau	UM hold
Ovide-Clermont	25,291	Borough councillor	8,175; 32.32%	Nicolas Bergeron; 1,140 (14.89%)	Monica Ricourt; 3,313 (43.28%)	Guerline Rigaud; 2,020 (26.39%)	Lynn Boulerice (RMM); 993 (12.97%); Henri-Paul Bernier (Ind.); 189 (2.47%)	Normand Fortin	UM hold

Source: Rapport officiel du recensement des votes, City of Montreal.
