= Jean-Marc Gibeau =

Canadian politician

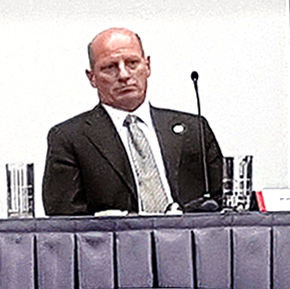
- Jean-Marc Gibeau in September 2016

Associate councillor on the Montreal Executive Committee with responsibility for resident services
- In office 2013–2017
- Preceded by: position created
- Succeeded by: position abolished

Montreal City Councillor for Ovide-Clermont
- In office 2005–2017
- Preceded by: position created
- Succeeded by: Chantal Rossi

Ville-Marie Borough Councillor, appointed by the Mayor of Montreal (with Karine Boivin Roy)
- In office 2013–2017
- Preceded by: Richard Bergeron and Véronique Fournier
- Succeeded by: Anne-Marie Sigouin and Richard Ryan

Montreal City Councillor for Montréal-Nord (with Marcel Parent and James Infantino)
- In office 2001–2005
- Preceded by: position created
- Succeeded by: position abolished

Montréal-Nord City Councillor for District Five
- In office 1998–2001
- Preceded by: redistribution
- Succeeded by: position abolished

Montréal-Nord City Councillor for District Six
- In office 1996–1998
- Preceded by: Réal Gibeau
- Succeeded by: redistribution

Personal details
- Party: Montreal Island Citizens Union/Union Montreal (2001-2013); Independent (2013); Équipe Denis Coderre (2013–)

Jean-Marc Gibeau is a politician in Montreal, Quebec, Canada. He served on the Montréal-Nord city council from 1996 to 2001 and on the Montreal city council from 2002 to 2017.

== Early life and private career ==
Gibeau has a college diploma from the Cégep Marie-Victorin in arts and letters (1976) and a diploma of the Association des courtiers d'assurances de la province de Québec (English: Insurance Brokers' Association of the Province of Quebec) from the Collège de Maisonneuve (1978). He has been employed with Les Assurances Gibeau Inc. since 1978 and has been its president since 1990.

He currently serves on the board of governors of the École nationale de police du Québec.

== Montréal-Nord city councillor ==
Gibeau was elected to the Montréal-Nord city council in a 1996 by-election, succeeding his father Réal Gibeau. He was re-elected in the 1998 municipal election.

== Montreal city councillor ==
All municipalities on the Island of Montreal, including Montréal-Nord, were amalgamated into a single city on January 1, 2002. Gibeau was elected to the Montreal city council as a candidate of Gérald Tremblay's Montreal Island Citizens Union (MICU) in the anticipatory 2001 Montreal municipal election, winning one of three seats in the Montréal-Nord borough. Tremblay won the mayoral election, MICU won a majority of seats on council, and Gibeau served on council as a supporter of Tremblay's administration. He was re-elected in 2005 and 2009, on the latter occasion for Tremblay's renamed Union Montreal party.

Gibeau resigned from Union Montreal on May 3, 2013, after serious allegations of corruption were made about the party at the Charbonneau Commission. The following month, he joined Équipe Denis Coderre pour Montréal. He was Denis Coderre's co-listed candidate in the 2013 election and continued to serve on council when the Coderre/Gibeau ticket was elected in Gibeau's ward and Coderre was simultaneously elected as mayor.

Gibeau was appointed as president of the Équipe Denis Coderre caucus following the election. He was also appointed as an associate member of the Montreal executive committee (i.e., the municipal cabinet) with responsibility for resident services and worked in conjunction with Anie Samson, the councillor responsible for the file.

By virtue of holding his seat on city council, Gibeau was automatically a member of the Montréal-Nord borough council from 2002 to 2017. He also served as one of the two members of the Ville-Marie borough council directly appointed by the mayor of Montreal from 2013 to 2017.

== Electoral record ==
2013 Montreal municipal election: Councillor, Ovide-Clermont
Party	Candidate	Votes	%	±%
Équipe Denis Coderre	Denis Coderre, co-listed with Jean-Marc Gibeau (incumbent)	6,376	72.20	
Coalition Montréal	Claude Fortin	1,098	12.43	
Projet Montréal	Vladimir Gelin	905	10.25	
Independent	Renée-Chantal Belinga	452	5.12	
Total valid votes		8,831	100	–
Total rejected ballots		458	4.93	–
Turnout		9,289	37.74	–
Electors on the lists		24,616	–	–
Source: Election results, 2013, City of Montreal.

2009 Montreal municipal election: Councillor, Ovide-Clermont
Party	Candidate	Votes	%	±%
Union Montreal	Jean-Marc Gibeau (incumbent)	3,787	49.21	
Vision Montreal	Brunilda Reyes	2,035	26.45	
Renouveau municipal de Montréal	Réjean Loyer	953	12.38	
Projet Montréal	Judith Houedjissin	920	11.96	
Total valid votes		7,695	100	–
Total rejected ballots		467	5.72	–
Turnout		8,162	32.27	–
Electors on the lists		25,291	–	–
Source: Election results, 2009, City of Montreal.

2005 Montreal municipal election: Councillor, Ovide-Clermont
Party	Candidate	Votes	%	±%
Citizens Union	Jean-Marc Gibeau (incumbent)	4,397	58.40	
Vision Montreal	Roland Carrier	2,466	32.75	
Projet Montréal	Saïd Ghoulimi	355	4.72	
White Elephant	Mathieu Bélanger	311	4.13	
Total valid votes		7,529	100	–
Source: Election results, 2005, City of Montreal.

2001 Montreal municipal election: Councillor, Montréal-Nord (three members elected)
Party	Candidate	Votes	%	±%
Citizens Union	Marcel Parent	12,884	18.76	
Citizens Union	Jean-Marc Gibeau	12,097	17.61	
Citizens Union	James Infantino	11,451	16.67	
Vision Montreal	Michelle Allaire	11,359	16.54	
Vision Montreal	Luigi di Vito	9,960	14.50	
Vision Montreal	Nicole Roy-Arcelin	9,590	13.96	
Independent	Jean-Claude Mvilongo	1,354	1.97	
Total valid votes		68,695	100	–
Source: Election results, 1833-2005 (in French), City of Montreal.
