= Gilles Deguire =

Borough mayor for Montréal-Nord and Montreal City Councillor
- In office January 1, 2010 – January 7, 2016
- Preceded by: Marcel Parent
- Succeeded by: Chantal Rossi

Personal details
- Party: Union Montréal(2009-2013); Équipe Denis Coderre pour Montréal (2013-)

Gilles Deguire was a city councillor from Montreal, Quebec, Canada, who served as the borough mayor of Montreal North from 2009 to 2016. He was a member of the Union Montreal municipal political party.

Deguire previously served as a political attaché to Line Beauchamp of the Quebec Liberal Party. Prior to his life in politics, he was a police officer with the Montreal Police Service for 30 years. A former resident of Montreal North, Deguire now resides in nearby Rivière-des-Prairies.

He resigned as borough mayor on January 7, 2016, after being the subject of a police investigation.

== Electoral record ==
2009 Montreal municipal election: Borough mayor, Montréal-Nord
| Party | Candidate | Votes | % | ±% |
|---|---|---|---|---|
| Union Montreal | Gilles Deguire | 6,784 | 40.50 | |
| Vision Montreal | Daniel Renaud | 4,317 | 25.77 | |
| Renouveau municipal de Montréal | Michelle Allaire | 3,213 | 19.18 | |
| Projet Montréal | Ronald Boisrond | 2,438 | 14.55 | – |
| Total valid votes | | 16,752 | 100 | – |
| Total rejected ballots | | 1,010 | 5.67 | – |
| Turnout | | 17,762 | 33.45 | – |
| Electors on the lists | | 53,098 | – | – |
Source: Election results, 2009, City of Montreal.
