= James Infantino =

Politician in Montreal, Canada

James V. Infantino

Montreal City Councillor for Marie-Clarac
- In office 2005–2009
- Preceded by: position eliminated
- Succeeded by: Clementina Teti-Tomassi

Montreal City Councillor for Montréal-Nord (with Marcel Parent and Jean-Marc Gibeau)
- In office 2002–2005
- Preceded by: position created
- Succeeded by: position eliminated

Montréal-Nord City Councillor, Division 8
- In office 1998–2001
- Preceded by: created by redistribution
- Succeeded by: position eliminated

Montréal-Nord City Councillor, Division 9
- In office 1994–1998
- Preceded by: Armand Nadeau
- Succeeded by: eliminated by redistribution

Personal details
- Party: Renouveau municipal (1994–2001); Montreal Island Citizens Union (MICU), renamed as Union Montreal (UM) (2001–09)

James V. Infantino is a retired politician in Montreal, Quebec, Canada. He was a member of the Montréal-Nord city council from 1994 to 2001 and a member of the Montreal city council from 2001 to 2009.

== Montréal-Nord city councillor ==
Infantino ran in the 1994 Montréal-Nord municipal election as a candidate of mayor Yves Ryan's Renouveau municipal and was elected without difficulty. A vocal supporter of the mayor, he was re-elected in 1998.

== Montreal city councillor ==
All of the municipalities on the Island of Montreal, including Montréal-Nord, were amalgamated into a single city on January 1, 2002. Infantino was narrowly elected to one of Montréal-Nord's three city council seats in the anticipatory 2001 Montreal municipal election as a candidate of Gérald Tremblay's Montreal Island Citizens Union (MICU). Tremblay won the mayoral election and his party won a majority of seats on council, and Infantino served as a supporter of Tremblay's administration. He was appointed to the Montreal Metropolitan Community in 2002, and by virtue of holding his city council seat he automatically served on the newly created Montréal-Nord borough council.

In 2004, Infantino argued that amalgamation had benefited Montréal-Nord by ensuring that road repairs would be covered by the city's central budget. The following year, he supported an extension of Quebec Autoroute 25 to Laval, which he said would improve pedestrian safety in his borough.

Infantino was re-elected in the 2005 municipal election, in which MICU won a second consecutive majority. He supported a controversial proposal to rename Montreal's Park Avenue after former Quebec premier Robert Bourassa in 2006; on the night of the vote, he was quoted as saying, "I think it's a one-for-one change. Park Ave. was great. Robert Bourassa was great."

He did not seek re-election in 2009.

== Electoral record ==
2005 Montreal municipal election: Councillor, Marie-Clarac
Party	Candidate	Votes	%	±%
Citizens Union	James Infantino (incumbent)	4,527	52.36	
Vision Montreal	Ibrahim Mustapha	2,815	32.56	
Projet Montréal	Monica Campo	764	8.84	
White Elephant	Louis Langevin	540	6.25	
Total valid votes		8,646	100	–
Source: Election results, 2005, City of Montreal.

2001 Montreal municipal election: Councillor, Montréal-Nord (three members elected)
Party	Candidate	Votes	%	±%
Citizens Union	Marcel Parent	12,884	18.76	
Citizens Union	Jean-Marc Gibeau	12,097	17.61	
Citizens Union	James Infantino	11,451	16.67	
Vision Montreal	Michelle Allaire	11,359	16.54	
Vision Montreal	Luigi di Vito	9,960	14.50	
Vision Montreal	Nicole Roy-Arcelin	9,590	13.96	
Independent	Jean-Claude Mvilongo	1,354	1.97	
Total valid votes		68,695	100	–
Source: Election results, 1833-2005 (in French), City of Montreal.

Montréal-Nord municipal election, 1998: Councillor, Division 8
Party	Candidate	Votes	%
Renouveau municipal	James Infantino (incumbent)	elected	
Sources: Le Gardien, September–October 2001, p. 28; "Vote recount abandoned," Montreal Gazette, 5 November 2001, A4.

1994 Montréal-Nord municipal election: Councillor, Division 9
Party	Candidate	Votes	%	±%
Renouveau municipal	James Infantino	1,079	80.34	
Collectivité de Montréal-Nord	Lise Leonard	264	19.66	
Total valid votes		1,343	100	–
Source: Voting Results: The Final Count," Montreal Gazette, 8 November 1994, A4.
