= Clementina Teti-Tomassi =

Canadian politician

Montreal City Councillor for Marie-Clarac
- In office November 2, 2009 – November 3, 2013
- Preceded by: James Infantino
- Succeeded by: Chantal Rossi

Montréal-Nord borough councillor for Marie-Clarac
- In office November 6, 2005 – November 2, 2009
- Preceded by: Georgette L. Morin
- Succeeded by: Chantal Rossi

Personal details
- Party: Union Montréal (2009-2013); Independent (2013-)
- Spouse: Tony Tomassi

Clementina Teti-Tomassi is a Canadian politician. She was previously a member of Montreal City Council, and represented the Marie-Clarac ward in the borough of Montréal-Nord. She was first elected in the 2005 municipal election, for the ward's borough council seat. She was elected again in the 2009 municipal election, this time for the Marie-Clarac city council seat.

She is married to Tony Tomassi, a former member of the National Assembly of Quebec. When her husband was implicated in an ethical scandal which resulted in his suspension from the Quebec Liberal Party caucus in 2011, both mayor Gérald Tremblay and civic opposition leader Louise Harel expressed public confidence in Teti-Tomassi, agreeing that she should not be assumed guilty by association. After Mayor Gérald Tremblay resigned amid corruption allegations revealed during the Charbonneau Commission and the resulting political upheaval at city hall, Teti-Tomassi left Union Montréal and served the remainder of her term as an Independent. She did not seek re-election in the 2013 municipal election.

== Municipal electoral record ==
2009 Montreal municipal election: City Councillor-Marie-Clarc
Party	Candidate	Votes	%	±%
Union Montreal	Clementina Teti-Tomassi	3,410	37.77	-14.59
Vision Montreal	Marc L. Fortin	2,817	31.20	-1.36
Projet Montréal	Hugues Surprenant	1,456	16.13	+7.29
Renouveau municipal de Montréal	Louis Pelletier	1,345	14.90	–
Total valid votes/expense limit		9,028	94.74	–
Total rejected ballots		501	5.26	–
Turnout		9,529	34.27	
Eligible voters		27,807	–	–

2005 Montreal municipal election: Borough Councillor-Marie-Clarc
Party	Candidate	Votes	%	±%
Union Montreal	Clementina Teti-Tomassi	4,379	51.09	-1.74
Vision Montreal	Diane St-Pierre	3,441	40.15	-4.40
Projet Montréal	Robert La Rose	751	8.76	new
Total valid votes/expense limit		8,571	100.00	–
Total rejected ballots		–	–	–
Turnout		–	–	
Eligible voters		–	–	–
