= François Croteau =

Canadian politician

Borough mayor for Rosemont–La Petite-Patrie and Montreal City Councillor
- In office January 1, 2010 – November 18, 2021
- Preceded by: André Lavallée
- Succeeded by: François Limoges

Personal details
- Born: January 29, 1972 (age 54)
- Party: Vision Montréal (2009-2011); Projet Montréal (2011-)
- Occupation: Professor

François William Croteau (born January 29, 1972) is a former member of the Montreal City Council and the mayor of the Borough of Rosemont–La Petite–Patrie, an office to which he was first elected in 2009.

Croteau was born and raised in Terrebonne, Quebec. Université de Montréal. He also holds a Master of Business Administration from the Université du Québec à Montréal (UQAM). He was a session lecturer at UQAM, teaching courses on city management, and also earned a Doctorate in Urban Governance. He has also served as a political staff member of Nicolas Girard the Parti Québécois MNA for Gouin prior to being elected to city council.

On June 19, 2013, he declared himself a candidate for the job of interim mayor of Montreal after the resignation of Michael Applebaum. However, in the council session on June 25 to select the new interim mayor, Croteau withdrew his candidacy before the vote, supporting eventual winner Laurent Blanchard.
