= Marcel Parent (politician) =

Canadian politician (1932–2024)

Borough Mayor of Montreal-Nord
- In office 2001–2009

Member of the National Assembly of Quebec for Sauvé
- In office 1984–1998
- Preceded by: Jacques-Yvan Morin
- Succeeded by: Line Beauchamp

Personal details
- Born: April 6, 1932 Montreal, Quebec, Canada
- Died: August 22, 2024 (aged 92) Montreal, Quebec, Canada
- Party: Quebec Liberal Party
- Education: Université de Montréal

Marcel Parent (April 6, 1932 – August 22, 2024) was a Canadian politician in Montreal, Quebec. He was chair of the Montreal Catholic School Commission (MCSC) from 1983 to 1984, a Liberal member of the National Assembly of Quebec from 1984 to 1998, and a member of the Montreal city council from 2001 to 2009. Parent died in Montreal on August 22, 2024, at the age of 92.

== Early life and career ==
Parent was born in Montreal on April 6, 1932. He attended Collège Notre-Dame du Sacré-Cœur. Parent earned a bachelor's degree in physical education and recreation from the Université de Montréal (1954), was a lecturer at the same institution from 1963 to 1965, worked in Montreal's parks department, and was assistant director of the city's sports and recreation department from 1980 to 1984. He held a number of positions and responsibilities in the fields of sports and leisure, including serving as Montreal's project officer for the World Youth Games in Denmark in 1967.

== School trustee ==
Parent was secretary and vice-chair of the Montreal Catholic School Commission's Regional Advisory Committee of Parents from 1970 to 1972. He sought election to the commission in the first direct elections for commissioners in 1973 with the combined endorsement of Mouvement scolaire confessionnel and Les parents solidaires, but was defeated. In 1980, he was elected without opposition as a Mouvement scolaire confessionnel candidate in the commission's sixteenth district. He was subsequently appointed to the MCSC's executive and was re-elected in 1983. He served as president from 1983 to 1984, in what appears to have been a contentious time for the board; one source has described his presidency as "raucous."

== Member of the National Assembly ==
Parent was elected to the National Assembly of Quebec in a 1984 by-election in the Montreal division of Sauvé, winning a landslide victory in what had previously been a Parti Québécois (PQ) seat. The PQ were in government during this time, and Parent served for the next year in opposition. He was re-elected in the 1985 provincial election, in which the Liberals won a majority government under Robert Bourassa's leadership, and served as a government backbencher. He was appointed as chair of the province's education committee on February 11, 1986, and held the position until August 9, 1989.

Parent was elected to a second full term in the 1989 provincial election, in which the Liberals were returned to office with a second consecutive majority. He was appointed as chair of the Liberal Party caucus on November 19, 1989. Quebec's political life was dominated in this period by the proposed Meech Lake Accord on reforming the Canadian Constitution. The accord, if approved, would have formally recognized Quebec as a distinct society within Canada. In April 1990, Parent was appointed to a thirteen-member Liberal Party committee led by Jean Allaire to explore options for Quebec, including sovereignty, if the accord failed. Parent was quoted at this time as saying, "if Meech is not adopted nobody can say what will happen."

The accord was eventually rejected, leading to a strong upsurge in support for the Quebec sovereigntist movement. While he himself was a committed Canadian federalist, Parent acknowledged that the sovereignty issue had become a matter of "pride and respect" for many in Quebec. In 1992, he helped ensure the Quebec Liberal Party's support of the Charlottetown Accord, another ultimately unsuccessful attempt at constitutional reform. Parent stood down as caucus chair on January 11, 1994, the same day that Bourassa resigned as premier, and served as chair of the provincial committee on institutions from January 26 to July 24, 1994.

In February 1992, Parent accompanied Quebec's education minister Michel Pagé on a trip to Israel to study how the country integrated new immigrants and encouraged the use of the Hebrew language.

Parent was re-elected again in the 1994 provincial election, in which the Parti Québécois won a majority government and the Liberals moved into opposition. He was appointed as his party's critic on senior's issues. He did not seek re-election in 1998 and instead gave his support to Line Beauchamp, his successor as the Liberal Party's candidate in the riding.

During the 1997 Canadian federal election, Parent served as a campaign co-chair for Liberal Party of Canada candidate Denis Coderre in the Bourassa riding.

== City councillor ==
Parent returned to political life in the 2001 Montreal municipal election, winning election as a candidate of Gérald Tremblay's Montreal Island Citizens Union (MICU) in the three-member division of Montréal-Nord. Tremblay was elected as mayor and MICU won a majority of seats on council; Parent was selected as chair (i.e., speaker) of council when it first met in early 2002 and also led a municipal committee on democracy and transparency in the city. Relations between municipal parties were extremely fraught after the 2001 election, and in late May 2002 Parent walked out of the chair's position in frustration at council's inability to move forward with its agenda. He returned to the position the following month. Parent also served as chair of the Montréal-Nord borough council after the 2001 election; in 2003, this position was restyled as borough mayor.

Parent was directly re-elected as Montréal-Nord's borough mayor in the 2005 municipal election and, by virtue of holding this position, automatically continued to serve on city council. Tremblay was re-elected as mayor of the city, MICU again won a majority on council, and Parent was again chosen as city council speaker. In 2006, he credited Montreal's 2002 amalgamation with giving Montréal-Nord an extra five million dollars in its budget.

Parent faced calls for his resignation following the shooting death of Fredy Villanueva by a Montreal Police officer in Montréal-Nord in August 2008. Some members of community organizations argued that Parent was "out of touch" and unaware of racial profiling in the community. He did not resign at the time, but he retired from politics the following year at age seventy-seven rather than seeking re-election in the 2009 municipal election.

== Electoral record ==
=== Municipal ===
2005 Montreal municipal election: Borough Mayor, Montréal-Nord
Party	Candidate	Votes	%	±%
Citizens Union	Marcel Parent	9,714	60.64	
Vision Montreal	Élaine Bissonnette	6,305	39.36	
Total valid votes		16,019	100	–
Source: Election results, 2005, City of Montreal.

2001 Montreal municipal election: Councillor, Montréal-Nord (three members elected)
Party	Candidate	Votes	%	±%
Citizens Union	Marcel Parent	12,884	18.76	
Citizens Union	Jean-Marc Gibeau	12,097	17.61	
Citizens Union	James Infantino	11,451	16.67	
Vision Montreal	Michelle Allaire	11,359	16.54	
Vision Montreal	Luigi di Vito	9,960	14.50	
Vision Montreal	Nicole Roy-Arcelin	9,590	13.96	
Independent	Jean-Claude Mvilongo	1,354	1.97	
Total valid votes		68,695	100	–
Source: Election results, 1833-2005 (in French), City of Montreal.

=== Provincial ===
1994 Quebec general election: Sauvé
Party	Candidate	Votes	%	±%
Liberal	Marcel Parent (incumbent)	13,447	53.85	-4.59
Parti Québécois	Jean-Pierre Bélisle	9,264	37.10	-0.58
Action démocratique	Yves Chapleau	1,562	6.26	–
New Democratic	Denis Plante	453	1.81	
Natural Law	Jean-Eudes Desrameaux	129	0.52	–
Innovator	André Giguere	72	0.29	–
No Affiliation	Keith Meadowcroft	43	0.17	–
Total valid votes		24,970	100.00	
Rejected and declined votes		547		
Turnout		25,517	80.26	+9.22
Electors on the lists		31,792		
Source: Official Results, Le Directeur général des élections du Québec.

1989 Quebec general election: Sauvé
Party	Candidate	Votes	%	±%
Liberal	Marcel Parent (incumbent)	14,091	58.44	
Parti Québécois	Michel Blondin	9,084	37.68	
Workers	Charles A. Guillaume	936	3.88	
Total valid votes		24,111	100.00	
Rejected and declined votes		851		
Turnout		24,962	71.04	
Electors on the lists		35,136		
Source: Official Results, Le Directeur général des élections du Québec.

1985 Quebec general election: Sauvé
Party	Candidate	Votes	%	±%
Liberal	Marcel Parent (incumbent)	15,677	61.12	
Parti Québécois	Charles Hardy	8,921	34.78	
New Democratic	Yves Alavo	462	1.80	
Progressive Conservative	Josée Ménard	346	1.35	
Christian Socialist	Mario Marcotte	134	0.52	
No Affiliation	Charles A. Guillaume	65	0.25	
Commonwealth of Canada	Jean Claude Souvray	43	0.17	
Total valid votes		25,648	100.00	
Rejected and declined votes		539		
Turnout		26,187	70.82	
Electors on the lists		36,977		
Source: Official Results, Le Directeur général des élections du Québec. Charles A. Guillaume was a candidate of the Workers Party who appeared on the ballot without affiliation as the party had been deregistered.

Quebec provincial by-election, June 18, 1984: Sauvé
Party	Candidate	Votes	%
Liberal	Marcel Parent	11,976	72.77
Parti Québécois	Charles Hardy	4,072	24.74
Businessman's Action	Lionel Taillon	286	1.74
Commonwealth of Canada	Paul Rochon	123	0.75
Total valid votes		16,457	
Rejected and declined votes		352	
Turnout		16,809	46.63
Electors on the lists		36,022	
Source: Official Results, Government of Quebec; The Commonwealth Party appeared on the ballot as the "Republican Party."

=== School board ===
Montreal Catholic School Commission election, 1983 (Trustee, District Sixteen)
Party	Candidate	Votes	%
Mouvement scolaire confessionnel	Marcel Parent (incumbent)	3,646	79.66
Independent	Lise Coderre-Ducharme	931	20.34
Total votes cast		4,577	100.00

Montreal Catholic School Commission election, 1980 (Trustee, District Sixteen)
Party	Candidate	Votes	%
Mouvement scolaire confessionnel	Marcel Parent	acclaimed	

Montreal Catholic School Commission, 1977 (Trustee, District Nineteen)
Party	Candidate	Votes	%
Independent	Paul Daigneault	3,829	51.99
Mouvement scolaire confessionnel– Les parents solidaires	Marcel Parent	1,937	26.30
Independent	Gilles St-Onge	1,109	15.06
Independent	J-Léopold Gagnier	490	6.65
Total votes cast		7,365	100.00
