= Tomassi =

Tomassi is a surname. Notable people with the surname include:

- Clementina Teti-Tomassi, Canadian politician
- Damiano Tomassi, Italian tambourine player and politician
- Malgosia Tomassi, interior designer
- Tony Tomassi, Quebec politician

== See also ==
- Rolo Tomassi, a British mathcore band from Sheffield, England
