= Marc-André Gadoury =

Canadian politician

Montreal City Councillor for Étienne-Desmarteau
- In office 2009–2017
- Preceded by: Carole Du Sault
- Succeeded by: Stéphanie Watt

Personal details
- Party: Projet Montréal (2009-2015); Équipe Denis Coderre (2015-present)

Marc-André Gadoury is a Canadian politician who served on Montreal City Council from 2009-2017, representing the district of Étienne-Desmarteau in the borough of Rosemont–La Petite-Patrie.

First elected in the 2009 municipal election as a member of Projet Montréal, he crossed the floor in August 2015 to join the Équipe Denis Coderre.
