= Véronique Fournier =

Montreal City Councillor for Saint-Henri–La Petite-Bourgogne–Pointe-Saint-Charles
- In office 2009–2013
- Preceded by: Line Hamel
- Succeeded by: Craig Sauvé

Ville-Marie Borough Council member, appointed by the Mayor of Montreal (with Richard Bergeron)
- In office 2012–2013
- Preceded by: Jocelyn Ann Campbell and Richard Deschamps
- Succeeded by: Jean-Marc Gibeau and Karine Boivin Roy

Personal details
- Party: Vision Montreal, Parti Québécois

Véronique Fournier served on the Montreal city council, representing Saint-Henri–La Petite-Bourgogne–Pointe-Saint-Charles as a member of Vision Montreal.

== Early life and career ==
Véronique Fournier has taught democratic practices for community organizations at the Université du Québec à Montréal (UQAM) and, as of 2013, is pursuing a graduate degree in public administration from the École nationale d'administration publique (ENAP).

== City councillor ==
Fournier was elected to Montreal city council in the 2009 municipal election, winning a narrow victory over Union Montreal and Projet Montréal candidates. Union Montreal won a council majority and formed government, initially with the two other parties as junior coalition partners and subsequently on its own.

Fournier was appointed as vice-chair of Montreal's finance committee in March 2012. Later in the same year, she accused the municipal government of being "far too timid" in its negotiations with city employees on pension changes. She also argued that the city should directly oversee construction of the Bonaventure Expressway, rather than contracting the work out to the Société du Havre de Montréal (SHM).

By virtue of holding her position on city council, Fournier also serves on the Sud-Ouest borough council, where she has served as chair of the urban planning and advisory committee. In 2011, the borough council voted to close the historical Bain Emard indoor pool due to a budgetary shortfall; Fournier described this as "a heartbreaking choice, but at this point the responsible choice." On other occasions, she has championed the preservation of heritage buildings. In 2012, she accused Transports Québec of having ignored the concerns of local residents in its plan to rebuild Montreal's Turcot Interchange.

Montreal mayor Gérald Tremblay resigned in late 2012 and was replaced by Michael Applebaum, who formed a new administration with representation from all parties on council and some independents. Shortly thereafter, Applebaum chose Fournier as one of two of his appointed representatives on the Ville-Marie borough council. In January 2013, Fournier welcomed Applebaum's announcement that the city would take control of the Bonaventure Expressway from the SHM.

== Provincial politics ==
In the 2014 provincial election, she ran for the Parti Québécois in Saint-Henri–Sainte-Anne but was defeated by incumbent Marguerite Blais.

== Electoral record ==
2014 Quebec general election
Party	Candidate	Votes	%	±%
Liberal	Marguerite Blais	19,795	52.52	+14.06
Parti Québécois	Véronique Fournier	8,255	21.90	-10.17
Coalition Avenir Québec	Louis-Philippe Boulanger	4,218	11.19	-4.24
Québec solidaire	Molly Alexander	4,029	10.69	-0.62
Green	Sharon Sweeney	700	1.86	–
Parti nul	Anna Kruzynski	293	0.78	–
Option nationale	Étienne Forest	225	0.60	-1.69
Bloc Pot	Jairo Gaston Sanchez	174	0.46	–
Total valid votes		37,869	100.00	–
Total rejected ballots		550	1.44	-0.23
Turnout		38,239	68.29	+0.18
Electors on the lists		55,999	–	–
Liberal hold		Swing		+12.12

2009 Montreal municipal election: Councillor, Saint-Henri–La Petite-Bourgogne–Pointe-Saint-Charles
Party	Candidate	Votes	%
Vision Montreal	Véronique Fournier	2,695	30.19
Union Montreal	Pierre Fréchette	2,538	28.43
Projet Montréal	Steeve Lemay	2,524	28.27
Independent	Sylvain Patry	792	8.87
Independent	Michel Fortin	378	4.23
Total valid votes		8,927	100
Source: Election results, 2009, City of Montreal.
