= Alvaro Farinacci =

Canadian politician

Montreal City Councillor for Cecil-P.-Newman
- In office 2001–2013

LaSalle City Councillor
- In office 1983–2001

Personal details
- Born: September 11, 1944 (age 81) Pescosansonesco, Italy
- Party: Union Montreal → Independent
- Children: Jason Farinacci, Liza Farinacci, Véronique Farinacci
- Profession: Real estate agent

Alvaro Farinacci (born September 11, 1944) is a Canadian politician who served on the Montreal City Council from 2001 to 2013.

Farinacci previously served as a municipal councilor in the former suburb of LaSalle from 1983 to 2001. He was responsible for a number of matters relating to urban development. During the same period, Mr. Farinacci held various other positions, including chairman of the Commission de L'aménagement du Territoire et du Développement Économique (Land Use Planning and Economic Development Committee), member of the Comité de Toponymie (Toponym Committee) and, for 16 years, was a member of LaSalle's Comité Consultatif D'urbanisme (Urban Planning Advisory Committee), where he served as the committee's first chairman.

Farinacci was a founding member of the Corporation de Développement Économique de LaSalle (CDEL) in 1984 and then served as CDEL's chairman for a number of years. He was additionally one of the founders of the Comité de Sécurité Industrielle (Committee on Safety in the Workplace). From 2001 to 2013, he was a council member of the Communauté métropolitaine de Montréal, where he filled the position of vice-chairman of the Commission Permanente du Logement Social (Standing Committee on Social Housing). At the present time, he is a member of Ville de Montréal's Commission sur le développement économique et urbain et l'habitation (committee on economic and urban development and housing).

Farinacci was a certified real estate agent for 40 years. He was also a member of the board of directors of Centre culturel Henri-Lemieux and the Fondation de l'Hôpital LaSalle, where he was a board member and vice-chairman for 25 years.
