= Renouveau municipal =

The Renouveau municipal (RM) was a political party in Montréal-Nord, a suburban community of Montreal, Quebec, Canada.

The RM was led by longtime Montréal-Nord mayor Yves Ryan and was the city's governing party for many years. Its dominance of the municipal political scene was significant: it won every seat on council in every municipal election from at least 1978 until Montréal-Nord was amalgamated into the new city of Montreal in 2001. Party candidates seldom faced significant challenges from opposition parties or independent candidates.

Yves Ryan was an opponent of Montréal-Nord's amalgamation with Montreal, and he did not seek a position on city council in the 2001 municipal elections. The RM ceased to exist after this time.
