= Christine Black =

Canadian politician

Borough mayor and City Councillor for Montréal-Nord
- Incumbent
- Assumed office April 24, 2016
- Preceded by: Chantal Rossi

Personal details
- Party: Union Montreal (2009-2013); Independent (2013); Ensemble Montréal (2013–)

Christine Black is a politician in Montreal, Quebec, Canada. She serves as borough mayor of Montréal-Nord and as a member of Montreal City Council since winning a by-election in April 2016. Black is a member of Ensemble Montréal. She has been re-elected as borough mayor three times.

== Early career ==
Originally from Montreal's South Shore area, Black moved to Montréal-Nord at age twenty to work for the Centre des jeunes l'Escale (English: L'Escale Youth Centre). She became the organization's director in 2006 and held this position until the time of her election to public office.

In 2008, she became a spokesperson for the Mouvement Solidarité Montréal-Nord, a group that formed following the shooting death of Fredy Villanueva by a police officer. She argued in favour of community policing during this period and was quoted as saying, "Part of the problem is you have police officers who aren't known around here coming in and making arrests, harassing people, and then leaving. It's important to have a police presence here, but they also need to understand the flavour of the neighbourhood and the benefits of dialogue and prevention." She also noted that part of her centre's mandate was to provide basketball, soccer, singing, and dancing programs for at-risk youth in the community.

Black has a certificate in social work from the Cégep du Vieux-Montréal (2001) and a Bachelor of Science degree from the Université de Montréal (2010). As of 2017, She was working toward the completion of a Master's Degree in Public Administration from the École nationale d'administration publique (ENAP), with a focus on health services and social services.

== Borough mayor and city councillor ==
Black was selected by Montreal mayor Denis Coderre to run as his party's candidate in a 2016 by-election for borough mayor in Montréal-Nord. She was 34 years old at the time of the election, and her campaign was focused on issues of economic renewal and lowering the poverty rate. The borough is considered a strong area of support for Coderre's party, and Black was elected without difficulty. Black was easily re-elected in the 2017, 2021 and most recently 2025 Montreal municipal election.

By virtue of serving as borough mayor, Black automatically became a member of the Montreal City Council and the Montréal-Nord borough council.

== Electoral record ==
2025 Montreal municipal election: Borough Mayor Montréal-Nord
Party	Candidate	Votes	%	±%
Ensemble Montréal	Christine Black	8,148	61.82	-2.42
Action Montréal	Anastasia Marcelin	2,452	18.60	+16.57
Projet Montréal	Roger Petit-Frère	1,924	14.60	-14.69
Independent	Salih Akpinar	656	4.98	–
Total valid votes/expense limit		13,180	94.67	
Total rejected ballots		742	5.33	+1.90
Turnout		13,922	27.99	-5.54
Eligible voters		49,748	–	–

2021 Montreal municipal election: Borough Mayor Montréal-Nord
Party	Candidate	Votes	%	±%
Ensemble Montréal	Christine Black	10,638	64.24	-2.04
Projet Montréal	Will Prosper	4,851	29.29	-4.43
Mouvement Montréal	Carl-Henry Jean-François	735	4.44	new
Action Montréal	Vito Salvaggio	337	2.03	new
Total valid votes/expense limit		16,561	96.57	
Total rejected ballots		588	3.43	-2.31
Turnout		17,149	33.53	-1.87
Eligible voters		51,140	–	–

2017 Montreal municipal election: Borough Mayor Montréal-Nord
Party	Candidate	Votes	%	±%
Équipe Denis Coderre	Christine Black	11,864	66.28	-2.32
Projet Montréal	Balarama Holness	6,036	33.72	+10.61
Total valid votes/expense limit		17,900	94.24	
Total rejected ballots		1,095	5.76	+4.28
Turnout		18,995	35.40	+14.82
Eligible voters		53,662	–	–

Montreal municipal by-election, April 24, 2016 (by-election): Borough mayor, Montréal-Nord
Party	Candidate	Votes	%	±%
Équipe Denis Coderre	Christine Black	7,577	68.60	
Projet Montréal	Kerlande Mibel	2,553	23.11	
Independent	Jacques Massicotte	614	5.56	
Independent	Rached Teffaha	301	2.73	
Total valid votes		11,045	100	–
Total rejected ballots		166	1.48	–
Turnout		11,211	20.57	
Electors on the lists		54,494	–	–
Source: Official preliminary results of the by-election held on April 24, 2016: Christine Black wins, City of Montreal.
