= Société du Havre de Montréal =

Société du Havre de Montréal (SHM) was a publicly funded, non-profit business in Montreal, Quebec, Canada. It was created in 2002 to oversee the redevelopment of Montreal's harbourfront via the reconstruction of the Bonaventure Expressway. In January 2013, the city of Montreal announced that it would take over the SHM's responsibilities, and it was completed by the end of April.

== History ==
The SHM was established in 2002 to design a plan for the redevelopment of Montreal's harbourfront. The organization initially received funding from the municipal, Quebec provincial, and Canadian federal governments. In 2007, it presented a final report entitled Vision 2025; the provincial and federal governments withdrew their funding shortly thereafter.

The SHM was criticized by opposition municipal parties, which accused it of financial mismanagement, unaccountability, and having a conflict-of-interest situation in its leadership. City councillor Véronique Fournier said in 2013, "We always believed the SHM was a recipe for disaster. Because it's a private corporation, it isn't bound to the same kind of access to information laws as the city. So while I'm not saying there was ever anything criminal happening at the SHM, the ingredients were definitely there." Montreal's auditor-general, Jacques Bergeron, indicated that it was almost impossible to ascertain the real costs of the SHM's studies and consultations in the absence of a reliable paper trail.

Montreal mayor Michael Applebaum announced on January 24, 2013 that the city of Montreal would take over responsibility for the Bonaventure Expressway from the SHM, citing the need for transparency. The SHM would then be dismantled by April 30.
