= Suzanne Décarie =

Canadian politician

Montreal City Councillor for Pointe-aux-Trembles
- In office November 2009 – November 2021
- Preceded by: André Bélisle
- Succeeded by: Virginie Journeau

Personal details
- Party: Vision Montréal (2009-2013); Independent (2013); Équipe Denis Coderre (2013-present)

Suzanne Décarie is a Canadian politician, who has been a Montreal City Councillor for the Pointe-aux-Trembles ward in the borough of Rivière-des-Prairies–Pointe-aux-Trembles since 2009.

She was first elected to city council in 2009 as a member of the Vision Montréal party, following a stint as the same district's representative on the borough council. She briefly served as interim borough mayor of Rivière-des-Prairies–Pointe-aux-Trembles in 2010, between the resignation of Joe Magri and the election of Chantal Rouleau.

However, she left the Vision Montréal caucus to sit as an independent councillor on May 30, 2013, indicating that she will run for reelection in the 2013 election as part of Équipe Denis Coderre.
