= Chantal Rossi =

Canadian politician

Montreal City Councillor for Ovide-Clermont
- Incumbent
- Assumed office November 7, 2017
- Preceded by: Jean-Marc Gibeau

Borough mayor of Montréal-Nord (interim)
- In office January 2016 – April 2016
- Preceded by: Gilles Deguire
- Succeeded by: Christine Black

Montreal City Councillor for Marie-Clarac
- In office November 3, 2013 – November 7, 2017
- Preceded by: Clementina Teti-Tomassi
- Succeeded by: Abdelhaq Sari

Montréal-Nord borough councillor for Marie-Clarac
- In office 2009–2013
- Preceded by: Clementina Teti-Tomassi
- Succeeded by: Monica Ricourt

Member of the Commission scolaire de la Pointe-de-l'Île, District Sixteen
- In office 1998–2014
- Preceded by: position created
- Succeeded by: position eliminated

Personal details
- Party: Union Montreal (2009-2013); Independent (2013); Ensemble Montréal (2013–)

Chantal Rossi is a politician in Montreal, Quebec, Canada. She has served on the Montreal city council since 2013 as a member of Équipe Denis Coderre pour Montréal. She was previously a borough councillor in Montréal-Nord from 2009 to 2013 and an elected trustee on the Commission scolaire de la Pointe-de-l'Île from 1998 to 2014.

== Early life and career ==
Rossi was born in Montréal-Nord. She is the daughter of Carlo Rossi, who represented Bourassa in the House of Commons of Canada from 1979 to 1988. In 1987, she helped convince her father to reverse his long-standing support for capital punishment and to vote against its re-introduction.

A mother at a young age, Rossi worked for several years as a Bank of Montreal cashier before entering public life. She is a trained mezzo-soprano singer and has performed at concerts in Montreal.

== School commissioner ==
Rossi was first elected to the Commission scolaire de la Pointe-de-l'Île in 1998 and was re-elected in 2003 and 2007. She was not a candidate in the deferred election of 2014.

== Borough councillor ==
Rossi was elected to the Montréal-Nord borough council in the 2009 Montreal municipal election as a Union Montreal candidate in Marie-Clarac. On council, she had special responsibility for culture and preparations for Montréal-Nord's centenary in 2015. She resigned from Union Montreal on February 21, 2013, after a corruption scandal implicated some of the party's leading members and joined Équipe Denis Coderre pour Montréal on June 17 of the same year.

== City councillor ==
Rossi was elected to the Montreal city council for Marie-Clarac in the 2013 municipal election. Denis Coderre was elected as mayor and his party won a plurality of seats on council; on November 18, 2013, Coderre appointed Rossi as an associate councillor to the Montreal executive committee (i.e., the municipal cabinet) with responsibility for culture, heritage, and design. She worked in conjunction with Manon Gauthier, the executive councillor responsible for these files.

Rossi continues to serve on the Montréal-Nord borough council by virtue of holding her position on city council. When Gilles Deguire resigned as borough mayor amid scandal in January 2016, Rossi was appointed as his interim replacement. She served in this role until April 2016, when Christine Black was elected to the position in a by-election. During her tenure as mayor, the city of Montreal introduced a sculpture resembling a ferris wheel as an identifying beacon in one of Montréal-Nord's busiest thoroughfares. The sculpture prompted some criticism for its $1.1 million cost, although many defended it on the grounds that it added a "rare bit of positive recognition" for the frequently troubled region of the city. Rossi was quoted as saying, "It's clear that Montreal North has experienced a lot of pain [in recent years]. This helps to put a balm on that pain."

In the 2017 Montreal municipal election, Rossi ran as co-candidate for Coderre in the district of Ovide-Clermont. This means that if Coderre had been elected mayor and also city councillor for Ovide-Clermont, he would have sat as mayor and Rossi would have assumed the post of city councillor for Ovide-Clermont. Coderre won the city councillor election but lost the mayoral election; as he chose to resign from municipal politics, he exercised his option to cede the city council post to Rossi.

== Electoral record ==
=== Municipal ===
2025 Montreal municipal election: City Councillor-Ovide-Clermont
Party	Candidate	Votes	%	±%
Ensemble Montréal	Chantal Rossi	3,508	65.75	-1.87
Projet Montréal	Annie-Claude Beaudry	1,264	23.69	-8.71
Futur Montréal	Shukria Lodin	563	10.55	new
Action Montréal	~~Samantha Vixama~~; Candidacy withdrawn	–	–	–
Total valid votes/expense limit		5,335	88.92	–
Total rejected ballots		665	11.08	+6.32
Turnout		6,000	26.59	-6.34
Eligible voters		22,569	–	–

2021 Montreal municipal election: City Councillor-Ovide-Clermont
Party	Candidate	Votes	%	±%
Ensemble Montréal	Chantal Rossi; Co-candidate for Denis Coderre	5,060	67.62	+2.15
Projet Montréal	Fatima Gabriela Salazar Gomez	2,423	32.38	-2.15
Total valid votes/expense limit		7,483	95.24	
Total rejected ballots		374	4.76	-0.33
Turnout		7,857	32.93	-1.41
Eligible voters		23,860	–	–

2017 Montreal municipal election: City Councillor-Ovide-Clermont
Party	Candidate	Votes	%	±%
Équipe Denis Coderre	Chantal Rossi; Co-candidate for Denis Coderre	5,409	65.47	-6.73
Projet Montréal	Sacha-Wilky Merazil	2,853	34.53	+24.28
Total valid votes/expense limit		8,262	94.91	
Total rejected ballots		443	5.09	+0.16
Turnout		8,705	34.34	-3.40
Eligible voters		25,348	–	–

2013 Montreal municipal election: Councillor, Marie-Clarac
Party	Candidate	Votes	%	±%
Équipe Denis Coderre	Chantal Rossi	6,292	63.29	
Coalition Montréal	Michelle Allaire	2,123	21.36	
Projet Montréal	Andrea Cohen	1,526	15.35	
Total valid votes		9,941	100	–
Total rejected ballots		731	6.85	–
Turnout		10,672	38.96	
Electors on the lists		27,391	–	–
Source: Election results, 2013, City of Montreal.

2009 Montreal municipal election: Montréal-Nord borough Councillor, Marie-Clarac
Party	Candidate	Votes	%	±%
Union Montreal	Chantal Rossi	3,506	38.96	
Vision Montreal	Roland Carrier	2,824	31.38	
Renouveau municipal de Montréal	Jeannette Belisle	1,413	15.70	
Projet Montréal	Saïd Ghoulimi	1,256	13.96	
Total valid votes		8,999	100	–
Total rejected ballots		507	5.33	–
Turnout		9,506	34.19	–
Electors on the lists		27,807	–	–
Source: Election results, 2009, City of Montreal.

=== School board ===
Commission scolaire de la Pointe-de-l'Île election, 2007 (Trustee, District Sixteen)
Candidate	Votes	%
Chantal Rossi (incumbent)	285	64.63
Réjean Loyer	156	35.37
Total votes	441	100.00

Commission scolaire de la Pointe-de-l'Île election, 2003 (Trustee, District Sixteen)
Candidate	Votes	%
Chantal Rossi (incumbent)	acclaimed	

Commission scolaire de la Pointe-de-l'Île election, 1998 (Trustee, District Sixteen)
Candidate	Votes	%
Chantal Rossi (incumbent)	390	41.94
Isabelle Laurin	290	31.18
Louise Dagenais	250	26.88
Total votes	930	100.00
