= Montréal-Nord borough council =

The Montréal-Nord borough council is the local governing body of Montréal-Nord, a borough in the City of Montreal. The council consists of five members: the borough mayor (who also serves as a Montreal city councillor), two city councillors representing the borough's electoral districts, and two borough councillors representing the same electoral districts.

Montréal-Nord is former Montreal mayor Denis Coderre's home territory, and his Équipe Denis Coderre pour Montréal now re-named Ensemble Montreal party is the dominant party in the borough.

== Current members ==
District	Position	Name	Party
—	Borough mayor City councillor	Christine Black	Ensemble Montréal
Marie-Clarac	City councillor	Vacant	
Marie-Clarac	Borough councillor	Jean Marc Poirier	Ensemble Montréal
Ovide-Clermont	City councillor	Chantal Rossi	Ensemble Montréal
Ovide-Clermont	Borough councillor	Philippe Thermidor	Ensemble Montréal

Former members

- Monica Ricourt was born in Montreal. She has a Bachelor of Arts degree in Political Science from the Université du Québec à Montréal (2001). Ricourt was a member of the borough council from 2009 to 2017; she also served in the board of Société de transport de Montréal from 2009 to 2013. Originally elected for Union Montreal, she left this party in May 2013 and joined Coderre's party in June of the same year.
