= Anie Samson =

Canadian politician

Borough mayor for Villeray–Saint-Michel–Parc-Extension and Montreal City Councillor
- In office January 1, 2006 – November 5, 2017
- Succeeded by: Giuliana Fumagalli

Personal details
- Party: Vision Montréal (1994-2013); Équipe Denis Coderre pour Montréal (2013-)

Anie Samson was a city councillor from Montreal, Quebec, Canada. She became borough mayor of Villeray–Saint-Michel–Parc-Extension on January 1, 2006. She was reelected on November 1, 2009. She lost her election on November, 5th, 2017.

She is one of the founding members of the Vision Montreal municipal political party. She previously served as city councillor for the district of Villeray from 1994 to 2005.

Samson has a Bachelor's degree in political science specializing in international relations from Université de Montréal as well as a Master's Degree in communications.
