= Aref Salem =

Canadian politician

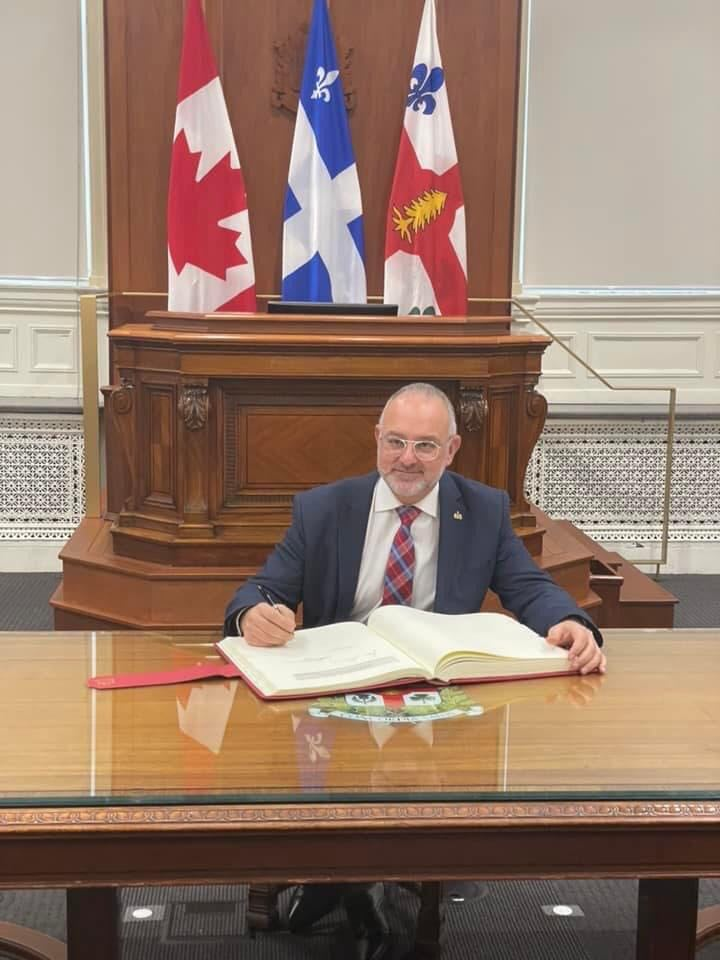

Interim Leader of Ensemble Montréal
- In office November 16, 2021 – February 28, 2025
- Preceded by: Denis Coderre
- Succeeded by: Soraya Martinez Ferrada

Montreal City Councillor for Norman-McLaren
- Incumbent
- Assumed office 2009
- Preceded by: Patricia Bittar

Personal details
- Born: Lebanon
- Party: Ensemble Montréal (since 2013); Union Montréal (2009-2013); Vision Montréal (2005-2009)

Aref Salem is a Canadian politician in Montreal, Quebec. He has served on the Montreal city council since 2009 as a member of Ensemble Montréal. He represents the Norman-McLaren district in the Saint-Laurent borough of Montreal.

Since November 2025, Salem has served as chairman of the board of directors of the Montreal Transit Corporation and co-vice chairman of the executive committee of the City of Montreal. From November 2021 to February 2025, he held the position of interim leader of Ensemble Montréal and leader of the official opposition at Montreal City Council.

== Political career ==
Between 2013 and 2017, Salem was responsible for transportation on Montreal's executive committee, in addition to serving on several boards of directors, including BIXI Montreal and Parking Montreal. Between 2017 and 2021, he served as vice-chair of the Commission on Transportation and Public Works.

In the 2021 municipal elections, Salem won a fourth term as city councillor for the Norman-McLaren district in the borough of Saint-Laurent, with 64.66% of the vote. On November 16, he obtained the confidence of the Ensemble Montréal caucus to serve as interim leader of the party and leader of the official opposition, which represented a total of 38 elected officials, including 23 on city council. He remained interim leader until February 2025.

During the municipal elections on November 2, 2025, he once again won re-election with 67.07% of the vote. The party he represented, Ensemble Montréal, also won the Montreal mayoral election. Salem was then appointed chairman of the board of directors of the Société de transport de Montréal (STM) and vice-chairman of the City of Montreal's executive committee by Mayor Soraya Martinez Ferrada.
