= Richard Deschamps =

Canadian politician

Vice-chair of the Montreal Executive Committee
- In office November 2009 – November 2012

Montreal City Councillor for Sault-Saint-Louis
- Incumbent
- Assumed office January 1, 2002
- Preceded by: Position created

LaSalle City Councillor
- In office 1999 – December 31, 2001
- Succeeded by: Position abolished

Personal details
- Party: Union Montreal (2001-2013); Independent (2013-)
- Occupation: Management consultant

Richard Deschamps is a Canadian politician from Montreal, Quebec. He currently serve as vice-chairman of the Montreal Executive Committee, responsible for infrastructure and economic development, and sits on Montreal City Council representing the Sault-Saint-Louis district of the borough of LaSalle. He was a member of the Union Montreal party.

== Career ==
Deschamps holds a Master of Business Administration, a Master of Science in industrial relations, and a Bachelor of Arts in psychology.

He has previously held teaching positions at Cégep Marie-Victorin, HEC Montréal and Université de Montréal. He has worked as a management consultant for National Bank of Canada, Transat Group and the Fonds de solidarité FTQ.

He was first elected to city council in the former city of LaSalle in 1999. Following the merger of LaSalle into Montreal he has represented Sault-Saint-Louis on Montreal City Council since 2002.

Following the resignation of Gérald Tremblay, on November 8, 2012 Union Montreal announced Deschamps as its nominee for Mayor of Montreal in the council vote to be held on November 16. In the final vote, he was defeated by Michael Applebaum, winning 29 votes to Applebaum's 31.
