= Cégep Marie-Victorin =

Public college in Montréal, Quebec

Coordinates: 45°36′57″N 73°36′34″W

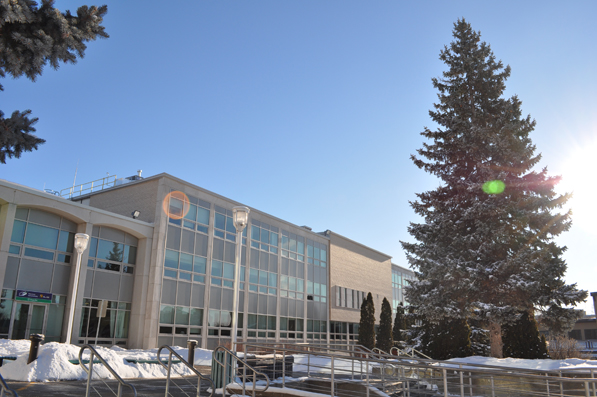
- Type: Public
- Location: Montréal
- Website: www.collegemv.qc.ca

The Cégep Marie-Victorin (French pronunciation: [seʒɛp maʁi viktɔʁɛ̃]) is a French public college in Montreal, Quebec, Canada. It is located at 7000 rue Marie-Victorin in the borough of Montréal-Nord.

Cégep is an acronym for Collège d'enseignement général et professionnel, generally translated into English as vocational college.
