= Ensemble Montréal =

Canadian municipal political party

Ensemble Montréal - Équipe Soraya
- Active municipal party
- Leader: Soraya Martinez Ferrada
- Founded: May 23, 2013
- Headquarters: 1100 Cremazie Boulevard East, apt. 207; Montreal, Quebec; H2P 2X2
- Ideology: Localism; Big tent
- Political position: Centre to centre-right
- Seats on City Council: 34 / 65

Ensemble Montréal (officially Ensemble Montréal - Équipe Soraya) is a municipal political party in Montreal, Quebec, Canada. Led by Soraya Martinez Ferrada, the party holds a majority on the Montreal City Council.

The party held power from 2013 until 2017 during the administration of Denis Coderre, at the time known as Équipe Denis Coderre pour Montréal. Following Coderre's defeat to Projet Montréal's Valérie Plante in the 2017 election, Coderre left municipal politics, and the candidates that had been elected under the party's banner changed its name to Ensemble Montréal. He returned in the 2021 election but resigned following his mayoral defeat. Led by former MP Soraya Martinez Ferrada, who was elected leader by acclamation on February 28, 2025, the party returned to power in 2025.

The party has been a broad coalition of politicians who came from a variety of different parties prior to Ensemble's creation; however, it is generally considered to sit to the right of Projet Montréal on most issues. The party draws most of its support from wealthier parts of the city.

== 2013 elections ==
The party was created in 2013 under the name Équipe Denis Coderre pour Montréal to support the candidacy of Denis Coderre for Mayor of Montréal during the November 3, 2013 municipal elections. In 2012, Denis Coderre announced his candidacy for mayor of Montreal. Beginning in June 2013, seventeen sitting members of Montreal City Council, as well as several borough councillors, switched their party affiliation to Coderre's team. Most were sitting as independent councillors following the dissolution of the Union Montréal party in the wake of Gérald Tremblay's resignation as mayor in 2012, although Coderre attracted support from former Vision Montréal and Projet Montréal councillors as well.

The party also announced a number of non-incumbent candidates in other races, including former Radio-Canada journalist Philippe Schnobb. However, the party also faced some criticism for the fact that of the 19 candidates announced by the party as of early August, fifteen were incumbents and only four were new candidates, resulting in media speculation that Coderre could potentially fall short of his early promise to put forward a slate of candidates that was at least 50 per cent new.

=== Councillors ===
After the 2013 election, Équipe Denis Coderre held the following seats on Montreal City Council and borough councils.

Councillor	Borough	Position
Mario Batista	Saint-Léonard	borough councillor, Saint-Léonard-Ouest
Dimitrios Jim Beis	Pierrefonds-Roxboro	borough mayor
Frantz Benjamin	Villeray–Saint-Michel–Parc-Extension	city councillor, Saint-Michel
Richard Bergeron	Ville-Marie	city councillor, Saint-Jacques
Michèle Biron	Saint-Laurent	borough councillor, Norman-McLaren
Michel Bissonnet	Saint-Léonard	borough mayor
Christine Black	Montréal-Nord	borough mayor
Karine Boivin Roy	Mercier–Hochelaga-Maisonneuve	city councillor, Louis-Riel
Marie-Ève Brunet	Verdun	borough councillor, Champlain–L'Île-des-Sœurs
Richard Celzi	Mercier–Hochelaga-Maisonneuve	city councillor, Tétraultville
Harout Chitilian	Ahuntsic-Cartierville	city councillor, Bordeaux-Cartierville
Catherine Clément-Talbot	Pierrefonds-Roxboro	city councillor, Cap-Saint-Jacques
Jean-François Cloutier	Lachine	city councillor, Lachine
Jacques Cohen	Saint-Laurent	borough councillor, Côte-de-Liesse
Russell Copeman	Côte-des-Neiges–Notre-Dame-de-Grâce	borough mayor
Alan DeSousa	Saint-Laurent	borough mayor
Suzanne Décarie	Rivière-des-Prairies–Pointe-aux-Trembles	city councillor, Pointe-aux-Trembles
Mary Deros	Villeray–Saint-Michel–Parc-Extension	city councillor, Parc-Extension
Pierre Desrochers	Ahuntsic-Cartierville	city councillor, Saint-Sulpice
Gilles Déziel	Rivière-des-Prairies–Pointe-aux-Trembles	borough councillor, Pointe-aux-Trembles
Michelle Di Genova Zammit	Anjou	borough councillor, Centre
Érika Duchesne	Rosemont–La Petite-Patrie	city councillor, Vieux-Rosemont
Éric Dugas	L'Île-Bizard–Sainte-Geneviève	borough councillor, Sainte-Geneviève
Marc-André Gadoury	Rosemont–La Petite-Patrie	city councillor, Étienne-Desmarteau
Pierre Gagnier	Ahuntsic-Cartierville	borough mayor
Manon Gauthier	Verdun	city councillor, Champlain–L'Île-des-Sœurs
Jean-Marc Gibeau	Montréal-Nord	city councillor, Ovide-Clermont
Yves Gignac	Pierrefonds-Roxboro	borough councillor, Cap-Saint-Jacques
Richard Guay	Rivière-des-Prairies–Pointe-aux-Trembles	city councillor, La Pointe-aux-Prairies
Manuel Guedes	Rivière-des-Prairies–Pointe-aux-Trembles	borough councillor, La Pointe-aux-Prairies
Patricia Lattanzio	Saint-Léonard	city councillor, Saint-Léonard-Est
Elsie Lefebvre	Villeray–Saint-Michel–Parc-Extension	city councillor, Villeray
Pierre L'Heureux	Verdun	borough councillor, Champlain–L'Île-des-Sœurs
Sylvia Lo Bianco	Montréal-Nord	borough councillor, Ovide-Clermont
Réal Ménard	Mercier–Hochelaga-Maisonneuve	borough mayor
Francesco Miele	Saint-Laurent	city councillor, Côte-de-Liesse
Lorraine Pagé	Ahuntsic-Cartierville	city councillor, Sault-au-Récollet
Jean-François Parenteau	Verdun	borough mayor
Lionel Perez	Côte-des-Neiges–Notre-Dame-de-Grâce	city councillor, Darlington
Dominic Perri	Saint-Léonard	city councillor, Saint-Léonard-Ouest
Nathalie Pierre-Antoine	Rivière-des-Prairies—Pointe-aux-Trembles	borough councillor, Rivière-des-Prairies
Marie Potvin	Outremont	borough councillor, Robert-Bourassa
Giovanni Rapanà	Rivière-des-Prairies—Pointe-aux-Trembles	city councillor, Rivière-des-Prairies
Monica Ricourt	Montréal-Nord	borough councillor, Marie-Clarac
Chantal Rossi	Montréal-Nord	city councillor, Marie-Clarac
Chantal Rouleau	Rivière-des-Prairies–Pointe-aux-Trembles	borough mayor
Aref Salem	Saint-Laurent	city councillor, Norman-McLaren
Anie Samson	Villeray–Saint-Michel–Parc-Extension	borough mayor
Kimberley Simonyik	Lachine	borough councillor, Fort-Rolland
Lili-Anne Tremblay	Saint-Léonard	borough councillor, Saint-Léonard-Est
Monique Vallée	LaSalle	city councillor, Cecil-P.-Newman

=== Former ===
The following incumbent councillors affiliated with Équipe Denis Coderre in 2013 during the preceding council, but did not run or were defeated in the 2013 election.

Councillor	Borough	Position
Pierre Fréchette	Le Sud-Ouest	borough councillor, Saint-Henri–Petite-Bourgogne–Pointe-Saint-Charles
Helen Fotopulos	Côte-des-Neiges–Notre-Dame-de-Grâce	city councillor, Côte-des-Neiges
Ana Nunes	Outremont	borough councillor, Jeanne-Sauvé

== 2017 elections ==
Denis Coderre also contested the Montreal municipal elections in 2017 under the name Équipe Denis Coderre pour Montréal. On losing the 2017 municipal election, Denis Coderre left municipal politics. To disassociate themselves from their resigning leader, the party known as Équipe Denis Coderre first declared an intention to change its name to "Mouvement Montréal", but failed to register the name before making the announcement, allowing another party to quickly reserve the name for themselves.

Thus, the party had to come up with another new name and changed to "Ensemble Montréal."

=== Councillors ===
Following the 2017 municipal election, Équipe Denis Coderre held the following seats on Montreal City Council and borough councils.

Councillor	Borough	Position
Dimitrios Jim Beis	Pierrefonds-Roxboro	borough mayor
Michèle Biron	Saint-Laurent	borough councillor, Norman-McLaren
Michel Bissonnet	Saint-Léonard	borough mayor
Jacques Cohen	Saint-Laurent	borough councillor, Côte-de-Liesse
Alan DeSousa	Saint-Laurent	borough mayor
Mary Deros	Villeray–Saint-Michel–Parc-Extension	city councillor, Parc-Extension
Lionel Perez	Côte-des-Neiges–Notre-Dame-de-Grâce	city councillor, Darlington
Aref Salem	Saint-Laurent	city councillor, Norman-McLaren

=== Former ===
The following incumbent councillors elected under the Ensemble Montréal formation are no longer part of it.

Councillor	Borough	Position
Hadrien Parizeau	Ahuntsic-Cartierville	city councillor, Saint-Sulpice

== 2021 elections ==
The party was renamed to Ensemble Montréal from Équipe Denis Coderre pour Montréal on January 11, 2018. Coderre ran for mayor against Plante once again, and was defeated with a decreased vote and seat share. The party won 23 seats, down 2, with Coderre resigning as party leader following the results declaration.

Seat totals following the election:

Position	Ensemble Montréal
Mayor of Montreal	0
Borough mayor	6
City councillor	17
City council total	23
Borough councillor	15
Total seats	38

== 2025 elections ==
On February 28, 2025, Soraya Martinez Ferrada was elected leader by acclamation on February 28, becoming the party's candidate for mayor in the 2025 Montreal municipal election. Martínez Ferrada focussed her campaign on housing and affordability, and promised a review of the city's bike lanes. The party formed an electoral pact with Équipe LaSalle Team and Équipe Anjou. She was elected mayor on November 2, defeating Luc Rabouin of Projet Montréal. Ensemble Montréal also won a majority of seats on the Montreal City Council, with 34. The party became the first Montreal municipal party to elect 2 different mayors.

== Political positions ==
The party has often attacked Projet Montréal over anti-car policies. Interim party leader Lionel Perez has attacked the Plante Administration over its handling of the pilot project limiting private vehicular access to the Mount Royal service road.

The party has not consistently supported expansions to Montreal's mass-transit network. While then-Mayor Denis Coderre was a strong proponent of the Réseau express métropolitain, which is being built as a "public-public partnership" between the provincial government and the Caisse de dépôt et placement, the party has opposed the construction of the Pink Line (Montreal Metro). Ensemble Montréal proposed a pilot project that would keep the metro system open during the overnight hours on summer weekends.

While it was in power from 2013–2017, Ensemble Montréal planned to heat and widen sidewalks along a stretch of Sainte-Catherine Street West. Once Projet Montréal took office in 2017, the heating elements were removed from Sainte-Catherine's renovation plans due to their expense. However, plans to widen sidewalks and beautify the street were otherwise largely retained.

== Electoral performance ==
=== Mayoral election ===
Election	Candidate	Votes	%	Status	Result
2013	Denis Coderre	149,467	32.15	1st	Elected
2017	Denis Coderre	216,321	45.66	2nd	Lost
2021	Denis Coderre	158,751	37.97	2nd	Lost
2025	Soraya Martinez Ferrada	178,232	43.33	1st	Elected

=== City council ===
Election	City council seats	+/–	Position	Result
2013	26 / 65	▲26	▲1st	Government
2017	25 / 65	▼1	▼2nd	Opposition
2021	23 / 65	▼2	2nd	Opposition
2025	34 / 65	▲11	▲1st	Government
