= Montréal-Nord =

- Borough of Montreal
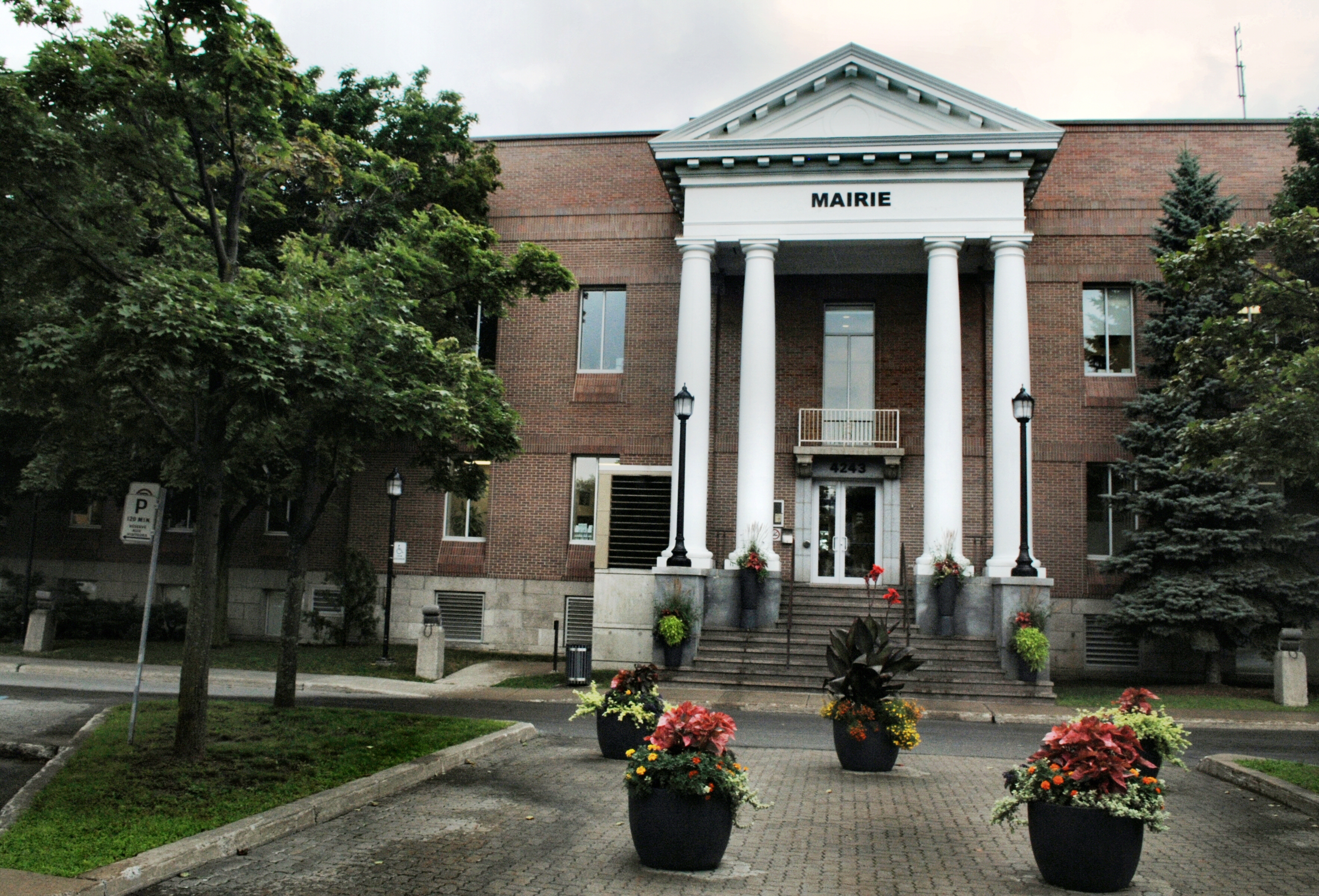
- Montréal-Nord borough hall

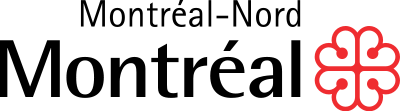

- Montréal-Nord location on the island of Montreal.
- Coordinates: 45°36′N 73°37′W
- Country: Canada
- Province: Quebec
- City: Montreal
- Region: Montreal
- Incorporated: 1915 (from Sault-au-Récollet)
- Merge into Montreal: January 1, 2002
- Electoral Districts Federal: Bourassa; Honore-Mercier
- Provincial: Bourassa-Sauvé; Maurice-Richard

Government
  - Type: Borough
  - Mayor: Christine Black (EM)
  - Federal MP(s): Abdelhaq Sari (LPC); Éric St-Pierre (LPC)
  - Quebec MNA: Madwa-Nika Cadet (LIB); Haroun Bouazzi (QS)

Area
  - Land: 11.1 km^{2} (4.3 sq mi)

Population (2016)
  - Total: 84,234
  - Density: 7,623/km^{2} (19,740/sq mi)
  - Dwellings: 35,015
- Time zone: UTC−5 (Eastern (EST))
  - Summer (DST): UTC−4 (EDT)
- Postal code(s): H1G, H1H
- Area codes: (514) and (438)
- Access Routes A-25: R-125
- Website: Montréal-Nord website (in French)

Montréal-Nord (French for 'Montreal North' / 'Montreal-North'; pronounced [mɔ̃ʁeal nɔʁ]) is a borough within the city of Montreal, Canada. It consists entirely of the former city of Montréal-Nord on the Island of Montreal in southwestern Quebec. It was amalgamated into the City of Montreal on January 1, 2002.

Around the start of the 21st century, Montréal-Nord developed a reputation as being one of Montreal's most dangerous boroughs, along with Hochelaga-Maisonneuve. The area contains a sizable community living below the poverty line, though it also has middle-class and upper-middle-class residences. It is also home to one of Canada's largest Haitian communities.

== Geography ==
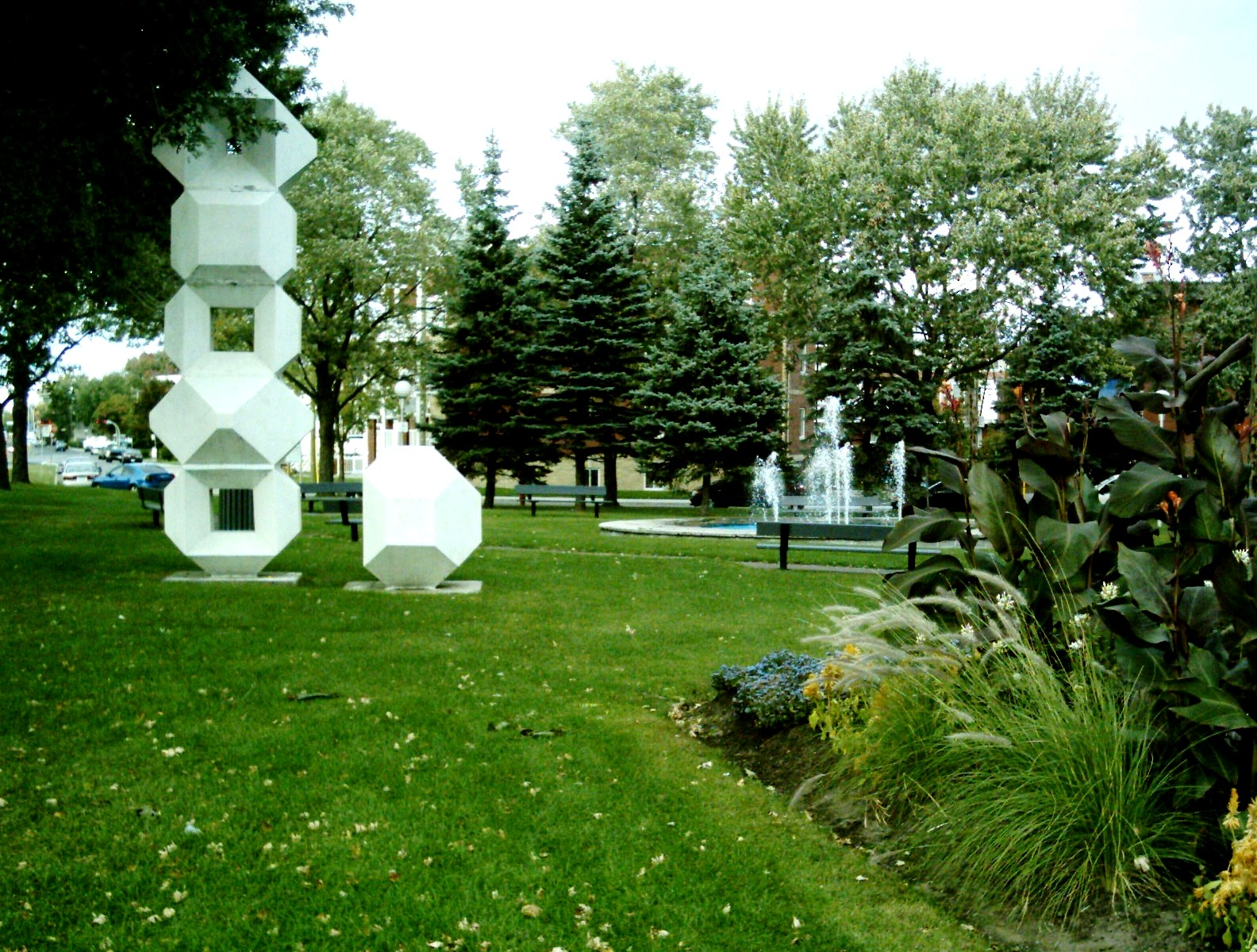
Pierre Granche's sculpture in park in Montréal-Nord.

The borough is an oblong municipal division situated along the Rivière des Prairies, in the northeastern part of the island.

It is bordered to the west by Ahuntsic-Cartierville, to the southwest by Villeray–Saint-Michel–Parc-Extension, to the south by St. Leonard, at the southeast corner by Anjou, and to the east by Rivière-des-Prairies–Pointe-aux-Trembles. The borough counts 29 parks and leisure structures.

Major thoroughfares in Montréal-Nord include St. Michel Blvd., Pie IX Blvd. (Route 125), Lacordaire Blvd., Langelier Blvd., Leger Blvd., and Henri Bourassa Blvd. The Pie IX Bridge connects Montréal-Nord to the Laval district of Saint-Vincent-de-Paul.

It has an area of 11.07 km^{2} and a population of 83,911.

== Demographics ==
Historical populations
Year	Pop.	±%
1966	67,806	—
1971	89,140	+31.5%
1976	97,250	+9.1%
1981	94,914	−2.4%
1986	90,303	−4.9%
1991	85,516	−5.3%
1996	81,581	−4.6%
2001	83,600	+2.5%
2006	83,911	+0.4%
2011	83,868	−0.1%
2016	84,234	+0.4%

Home language (2016)
Language	Population	Percentage (%)
French	48,010	67%
English	5,635	8%
Other languages	18,515	26%

Mother Tongue (2016)
Language	Population	Percentage (%)
French	40,965	52%
English	3,115	4%
Other languages	34,500	44%

Visible Minorities (2016)
Ethnicity	Population	Percentage (%)
Not a visible minority	41,885	51.3%
Visible minorities	39,755	48.7%

== Government and politics ==
=== Federal and provincial elections ===
The borough is located almost entirely in the federal riding of Bourassa, except for a tiny southeastern corner in Honoré-Mercier.

The provincial electoral district of Bourassa-Sauvé is coterminous with the borough except for a northwestern section in the electoral district of Maurice-Richard.

=== Borough council ===
District	Position	Name	Party
—	Borough mayor City councillor	Christine Black	Ensemble Montréal
Marie-Clarac	City councillor	Vacant	
Marie-Clarac	Borough councillor	Jean Marc Poirier	Ensemble Montréal
Ovide-Clermont	City councillor	Chantal Rossi	Ensemble Montréal
Ovide-Clermont	Borough councillor	Philippe Thermidor	Ensemble Montréal

According to the 2016 Census, visible minorities made up 48.7% of the population.

== Education ==
=== Elementary schools and High schools ===
The Commission scolaire de la Pointe-de-l'Île (CSPÎ) operates French language public schools. Public high schools that are part of this school board in this borough are École secondaire Calixa-Lavallée and École Secondaire Henri-Bourassa. There is also the Le Prélude program. There are 14 French language elementary schools in Montréal-Nord.

The English Montreal School Board operates the following English language public schools within Montréal-Nord:

- Galileo Adult Education Centre
- Lester B Pearson High School
- Gerald McShane School

Prior to 1998, the Montreal Catholic School Commission and the Protestant School Board of Greater Montreal ran all the English language public schools located in Montreal. At that time, public schools were segregated along religious lines instead of the current linguistic lines.

=== Public libraries ===
The borough has four libraries within the Montreal Public Libraries Network: Belleville, Bibliotheque de la Maison culturelle et communautaire, Charleroi, and Henri Bourassa.

== See also ==
- Boroughs of Montreal
- Districts of Montreal
- List of former cities in Quebec
- Municipal reorganization in Quebec
