= Montreal City Council =

Governing body in Montreal, Quebec

Montreal City Council Conseil municipal de Montréal

Type
- Type: Unicameral

Leadership
- Mayor: Soraya Martinez Ferrada, Ensemble Montréal since November 13, 2025
- Leader of the Opposition: Ericka Alneus, Projet Montréal since November 12, 2025

Structure
- Seats: 64 councillors and mayor
- Political groups: Government (34) Ensemble Montréal (34) Supported by (5) Équipe LaSalle Team (3) Équipe Anjou (2) Official Opposition (25) Projet Montréal (25) Other parties (1) Équipe St-Léonard (1) Independent (0)

Elections
- Voting system: First-past-the-post
- Last election: 2 November 2025
- Next election: 4 November 2029

Website
- ville.montreal.qc.ca

Montreal City Council (French: Conseil municipal de Montréal) is the governing body in the mayor–council government in the city of Montreal, Quebec. The head of the city government in Montreal is the mayor, who is first among equals in the city council. The council is a democratically elected institution and is the final decision-making authority in the city, although much power is centralized in the executive committee. The council consists of 65 members from all boroughs of the city. The council has jurisdiction over many matters, including public security, agreements with other governments, subsidy programs, the environment, urban planning, and a three-year capital expenditure program. The city council is also required to supervise, standardize or approve certain decisions made by the borough councils.

== City Hall ==
- Shed near Pointe à Callière 1642 – as town hall
- Château Maisonneuve ??
- Palais de l'Intendance 1698–1713?
- Château Ramezay 1760–1774
- Maison Beaujeu (320 Notre Dame)
- Bonsecours Market – home to city hall and council from 1852 to 1878
- Old Montreal Courthouse (now Édifice Lucien-Saulnier) 1922–1926; 2019–2024
- Montreal City Hall – 1878–1922; 1926–2019; 2024-present

== Committees ==
Reporting directly to the city council, the executive committee exercises decision-making powers similar to that of the cabinet in a parliamentary system and is responsible for preparing various documents including budgets and by-laws, submitted to the city council for approval. The decision-making powers of the executive committee cover, in particular, the awarding of contracts or grants, the management of human and financial resources, supplies and buildings. It may also be assigned further powers by the city council.

Standing committees are the council's prime instruments for public consultation. They are responsible for the public study of pending matters and for making the appropriate recommendations to the council. They also review the annual budget forecasts for departments under their jurisdiction. A public notice of meeting is published in both French and English daily newspapers at least seven days before each meeting. All meetings include a public question period. The standing committees, of which there are seven, have terms lasting two years. In addition, the city council may decide to create special committees at any time. Each standing committee is made up of seven to nine members, including a chairman and a vice-chairman. The members are all elected municipal officers, with the exception of a representative of the government of Quebec on the public security committee.

== Composition ==
The current city council consists of the mayor and 64 elected city councillors, including borough mayors. Unlike most Canadian cities, the city of Montreal has political parties; however, these are not chapters of any federal or provincial political parties, but are standalone entities at the municipal level.

Each borough is divided into between two and five districts, and has a different system of representation depending on its population. Each borough also has a five-member borough council, consisting of the borough mayor, any city councillors, and in certain boroughs additional borough councillors, as follows:

Borough	Representation on city council	Additional representation on borough council
Ahuntsic-Cartierville	Borough mayor and city councillors for 4 districts	None
Anjou	Borough mayor and 1 city councillor	Borough councillors for 3 districts
Côte-des-Neiges–Notre-Dame-de-Grâce	Borough mayor and city councillors for 5 districts	None
L'Île-Bizard–Sainte-Geneviève	Borough mayor only	Borough councillors for 4 districts
Lachine	Borough mayor and 1 city councillor	Borough councillors for 3 districts
LaSalle	Borough mayor and city councillors for 2 districts	Each district elects 2 borough councillors
Mercier–Hochelaga-Maisonneuve	Borough mayor and city councillors for 4 districts	None
Montréal-Nord	Borough mayor and city councillors for 2 districts	Each district elects 1 borough councillor
Outremont	Borough mayor only	Borough councillors for 4 districts
Pierrefonds-Roxboro	Borough mayor and city councillors for 2 districts	Each district elects 1 borough councillor
Le Plateau-Mont-Royal	Borough mayor and city councillors for 3 districts	Each district elects 1 borough councillor
Rivière-des-Prairies–Pointe-aux-Trembles	Borough mayor and city councillors for 3 districts	Each district elects 1 borough councillor
Rosemont–La Petite-Patrie	Borough mayor and city councillors for 4 districts	None
Saint-Laurent	Borough mayor and city councillors for 2 districts	Each district elects 1 borough councillor
Saint-Léonard	Borough mayor and city councillors for 2 districts	Each district elects 1 borough councillor
Le Sud-Ouest	Borough mayor and city councillors for 2 districts	Each district elects 1 borough councillor
Verdun	Borough mayor and city councillors for 2 districts	Each district elects 2 borough councillors
Ville-Marie	Mayor of Montreal (ex officio borough mayor) and city councillors for 3 districts	2 city councillors from other boroughs named by the Mayor
Villeray–Saint-Michel–Parc-Extension	Borough mayor and city councillors for 4 districts	None

== Party standings ==
The most recent election was the 2025 Montreal municipal election, in which Soraya Martinez Ferrada's Ensemble Montréal won 34 out of 65 available seats.

Party standings
Party	Leader	Seats as of 2 November 2025 election	Current seats
Ensemble Montréal	Soraya Martinez Ferrada	34 / 65	34 / 65
Projet Montréal	Ericka Alneus	25 / 65	25 / 65
Équipe LaSalle Team	Nancy Blanchet	3 / 65	3 / 65
Équipe Anjou	Luis Miranda	2 / 65	2 / 65
Équipe St-Léonard	Mauro Barone	1 / 65	1 / 65
Independent		0 / 65	0 / 65

== Current members ==
As of the 2025 election.

Borough	Position	Party	Name	Location
Ville-Marie	Mayor of Montreal		Soraya Martinez Ferrada	C
Ahuntsic-Cartierville	Borough mayor		Maude Théroux-Séguin	NW
Ahuntsic-Cartierville	Councillor, Ahuntsic		Nathalie Goulet	NW
Ahuntsic-Cartierville	Councillor, Bordeaux-Cartierville		Effie Giannou	NW
Ahuntsic-Cartierville	Councillor, Saint-Sulpice		Victor Esposito	NW
Ahuntsic-Cartierville	Councillor, Sault-au-Récollet		Carla Beauvais	NW
Anjou	Borough mayor		Luis Miranda	NE
Anjou	Councillor		Andrée Hénault	NE
Côte-des-Neiges–Notre-Dame-de-Grâce	Borough mayor		Stephanie Valenzuela	C
Côte-des-Neiges–Notre-Dame-de-Grâce	Councillor, Côte-des-Neiges		Émilie Brière	C
Côte-des-Neiges–Notre-Dame-de-Grâce	Councillor, Darlington		Milany Thiagarajah	C
Côte-des-Neiges–Notre-Dame-de-Grâce	Councillor, Loyola		Alexandre Teodoresco	C
Côte-des-Neiges–Notre-Dame-de-Grâce	Councillor, Notre-Dame-de-Grâce		Peter McQueen	C
Côte-des-Neiges–Notre-Dame-de-Grâce	Councillor, Snowdon		Sonny Moroz	C
L'Île-Bizard–Sainte-Geneviève	Borough mayor		Danielle Myrand	NW
Lachine	Borough mayor		Julie-Pascale Provost	S
Lachine	Councillor		Dominic Roussel	S
Lachine	Borough mayor		Nancy Blanchet	S
Lachine	Councillor, Cecil-P.-Newman		Laura Palestini	S
Lachine	Councillor, Sault-Saint-Louis		Richard Deschamps	S
Mercier–Hochelaga-Maisonneuve	Borough mayor		Chantal Gagnon	E
Mercier–Hochelaga-Maisonneuve	Councillor, Hochelaga		Sarah V. Doyon	E
Mercier–Hochelaga-Maisonneuve	Councillor, Louis-Riel		Alba Zuniga Ramos	E
Mercier–Hochelaga-Maisonneuve	Councillor, Maisonneuve–Longue-Pointe		Alexandre Devaux-Guizani	E
Mercier–Hochelaga-Maisonneuve	Councillor, Tétreaultville		Julien Hénault-Ratelle	E
Montréal-Nord	Borough mayor		Christine Black	NE
Montréal-Nord	Councillor, Marie-Clarac		Youssef Hariri	NE
Montréal-Nord	Councillor, Ovide-Clermont		Chantal Rossi	NE
Outremont	Borough mayor		Caroline Braun	C
Pierrefonds-Roxboro	Borough mayor		Dimitrios Jim Beis	NW
Pierrefonds-Roxboro	Councillor, Bois-de-Liesse		Benoit Langevin	NW
Pierrefonds-Roxboro	Councillor, Cap-Saint-Jacques		Sophie Mohsen	NW
Le Plateau-Mont-Royal	Borough mayor		Cathy Wong	C
Le Plateau-Mont-Royal	Councillor, De Lorimier		Maeva Vilain	C
Le Plateau-Mont-Royal	Councillor, Jeanne-Mance		Alex Norris	C
Le Plateau-Mont-Royal	Councillor, Mile-End		Marie Plourde	C
Rivière-des-Prairies–Pointe-aux-Trembles	Borough mayor		Denis Pelletier	NE
Rivière-des-Prairies–Pointe-aux-Trembles	Councillor, La Pointe-aux-Prairies		Diana Varela	NE
Rivière-des-Prairies–Pointe-aux-Trembles	Councillor, Pointe-aux-Trembles		Gabrielle Rousseau-Bélanger	NE
Rivière-des-Prairies–Pointe-aux-Trembles	Councillor, Rivière-des-Prairies		Giovanni Rapanà	NE
Rosemont–La Petite-Patrie	Borough mayor		François Limoges	E
Rosemont–La Petite-Patrie	Councillor, Étienne-Desmarteau		Ericka Alneus	E
Rosemont–La Petite-Patrie	Councillor, Marie-Victorin		Jocelyn Pauzé	E
Rosemont–La Petite-Patrie	Councillor, Saint-Édouard		Josefina Blanco	E
Rosemont–La Petite-Patrie	Councillor, Vieux-Rosemont		Olivier Demers-Dubé	E
Saint-Laurent	Borough mayor		Alan DeSousa	NW
Saint-Laurent	Councillor, Côte-de-Liesse		Vana Nazarian	NW
Saint-Laurent	Councillor, Norman-McLaren		Aref Salem	NW
Saint-Léonard	Borough mayor		Dominic Perri	NE
Saint-Léonard	Councillor, Saint-Léonard-Est		Arij El Korbi	NE
Saint-Léonard	Councillor, Saint-Léonard-Ouest		Mauro Barone	NE
Le Sud-Ouest	Borough mayor		Véronique Fournier	S
Le Sud-Ouest	Councillor, Saint-Henri-Est–Petite-Bourgogne– Pointe-Saint-Charles–Griffintown		Catherine Houbart	S
Le Sud-Ouest	Councillor, Saint-Paul–Émard–Saint-Henri-Ouest		Élise Tanguay	S
Verdun	Borough mayor		Céline-Audrey Beauregard	S
Verdun	Councillor, Champlain–L'Île-des-Sœurs		Andréanne Moreau	S
Verdun	Councillor, Desmarchais-Crawford		Sterling Downey	S
Ville-Marie	Councillor, Peter-McGill		Leslie Roberts	C
Ville-Marie	Councillor, Saint-Jacques		Claude Pinard	C
Ville-Marie	Councillor, Sainte-Marie		Christopher McCray	C
Villeray–Saint-Michel–Parc-Extension	Borough mayor		Jean François Lalonde	E
Villeray–Saint-Michel–Parc-Extension	Councillor, François-Perrault		Sylvain Ouellet	E
Villeray–Saint-Michel–Parc-Extension	Councillor, Parc-Extension		Elvira Carhuallanqui	E
Villeray–Saint-Michel–Parc-Extension	Councillor, Saint-Michel		Josué Corvil	E
Villeray–Saint-Michel–Parc-Extension	Councillor, Villeray		Martine Musau Muele	E

See the members of the Montreal Executive Committee
