= Verdun borough council =

The Verdun borough council is the local governing body of Verdun, a borough in the city of Montreal, Quebec, Canada. The council consists of seven members: the borough mayor (who also serves as a Montreal city councillor), two city councillors representing the borough's electoral districts, and four borough councillors representing of the same electoral districts (two per division).

Équipe Denis Coderre pour Montréal won a narrow majority on council in the 2013 Montreal municipal election, taking four seats to Projet Montréal's three. The same composition was returned in the 2017 election; however, shortly after the election, Mayor Parenteau left his party and became an independent upon assuming a position on the Montreal Executive Committee, leaving an evenly split council.

== Members in the current term (2017-2021) ==
District	Position	Name	Party
—	Borough mayor City councillor	Jean-François Parenteau	Équipe Denis Coderre (2017)
—	Borough mayor City councillor	Jean-François Parenteau	Independent (2017–)
Champlain–L'Île-des-Sœurs	City councillor	Marie-Josée Parent	Équipe Denis Coderre (2017–18)
Champlain–L'Île-des-Sœurs	City councillor	Marie-Josée Parent	Projet Montréal (2018–)
Champlain–L'Île-des-Sœurs	Borough councillor	Pierre L'Heureux	Équipe Denis Coderre
Champlain–L'Île-des-Sœurs	Borough councillor	Véronique Tremblay	Équipe Denis Coderre
Desmarchais-Crawford	City councillor	Sterling Downey	Projet Montréal
Desmarchais-Crawford	Borough councillor	Luc Gagnon	Projet Montréal
Desmarchais-Crawford	Borough councillor	Marie-Andrée Mauger	Projet Montréal

- Pierre L'Heureux is a history professor at Dawson College and the son of noted Quebec journalist and television presenter Gaston L'Heureux. He first ran for a borough council seat in the 2009 municipal election as a Vision Montreal candidate and was narrowly defeated by Andrée Champoux of Union Montreal. He was first elected in 2013.

== Members in previous terms ==
=== 2013–17 ===
District	Position	Name	Party
—	Borough mayor City councillor	Jean-François Parenteau	Équipe Denis Coderre
Champlain–L'Île-des-Sœurs	City councillor	Manon Gauthier	Équipe Denis Coderre
Champlain–L'Île-des-Sœurs	Borough councillor	Pierre L'Heureux	Équipe Denis Coderre
Champlain–L'Île-des-Sœurs	Borough councillor	Véronique Tremblay	Équipe Denis Coderre
Desmarchais-Crawford	City councillor	Sterling Downey	Projet Montréal
Desmarchais-Crawford	Borough councillor	Luc Gagnon	Projet Montréal
Desmarchais-Crawford	Borough councillor	Marie-Andrée Mauger	Projet Montréal

=== 2009–13 ===
District	Position	Name	Party
—	Borough mayor City councillor	Claude Trudel (2009–12)	Union Montreal
—	Borough mayor City councillor	Ginette Marotte (2012–13)	Independent
Champlain–L'Île-des-Sœurs	City councillor	Ginette Marotte (2009–12)	Union Montreal (2009–12)
Champlain–L'Île-des-Sœurs	City councillor	Ginette Marotte (2009–12)	Independent (2012)
Champlain–L'Île-des-Sœurs	City councillor	Vacant (2012–13)	
Champlain–L'Île-des-Sœurs	Borough councillor	Paul Beaupré	Union Montreal (2009–13)
Champlain–L'Île-des-Sœurs	Borough councillor	Paul Beaupré	Independent (2013)
Champlain–L'Île-des-Sœurs	Borough councillor	Andrée Champoux	Union Montreal (2009–12)
Champlain–L'Île-des-Sœurs	Borough councillor	Andrée Champoux	Independent (2012–13)
Desmarchais-Crawford	City councillor	Alain Tassé	Union Montreal (2009–12)
Desmarchais-Crawford	City councillor	Alain Tassé	Independent (2012–13)
Desmarchais-Crawford	Borough councillor	Ann Guy	Union Montreal (2009–12)
Desmarchais-Crawford	Borough councillor	Ann Guy	Independent (2012–13)
Desmarchais-Crawford	Borough councillor	André Savard	Union Montreal (2009–12)
Desmarchais-Crawford	Borough councillor	André Savard	Independent (2012–13)

- Paul Beaupré served on the borough council from 2005 to 2013 and was for a time as chair of the borough's environment commission. He was the only Union Montreal member of the Verdun borough council not to resign from the party in late 2012, following Gérald Tremblay's resignation as mayor of Montreal in response to serious revelations of municipal corruption at the Charbonneau Commission. Union Montreal subsequently dissolved, and Beaupré ran in the 2013 municipal election as a candidate of Coalition Montréal; he was defeated. A candidate named Paul Beaupré sought election to the Verdun city council in the 1985 municipal election, prior to Verdun's amalgamation into Montreal; this was presumably the same person.
- Andrée Champoux served on the borough council from 2009 to 2013. She left Union Montreal on December 4, 2012. When Verdun borough mayor Claude Trudel resigned from office shortly thereafter, Champoux put forward her name to become his interim successor. She was defeated by city councillor Ginette Marotte in a four-to-two vote among the remaining borough council members. She sought election for borough mayor in the 2013 municipal election as the candidate of her own Équipe Andrée Champoux pour Verdun party but was defeated.
- Ann Guy served on the borough council from 2009 to 2013. She resigned from Union Montreal on December 4, 2012, and did not seek re-election in 2013.
- André Savard served on the borough council from 2005 to 2013, having previously sought election without success in 2001 as a Vision Montreal candidate. In his second term, he served as chair of the borough's public works, traffic, and public safety and security committee. He left Union Montreal in late November 2012. He sought election for borough mayor in the 2013 municipal election as the candidate of the Option Verdun/Montréal party but was defeated. Savard is the son of Raymond Savard, a former Liberal Member of Parliament (MP) and the mayor of Verdun from 1985 to 1993.

=== 2005–09 ===
District	Position	Name	Party
—	Borough mayor City councillor	Claude Trudel	Montreal Island Citizens Union
Champlain–L'Île-des-Sœurs	City councillor	Ginette Marotte	Montreal Island Citizens Union
Champlain–L'Île-des-Sœurs	Borough councillor	Paul Beaupré	Montreal Island Citizens Union
Champlain–L'Île-des-Sœurs	Borough councillor	Marc Touchette	Montreal Island Citizens Union
Desmarchais-Crawford	City councillor	Alain Tassé	Montreal Island Citizens Union
Desmarchais-Crawford	Borough councillor	Josée Lavigueur Thériault	Montreal Island Citizens Union
Desmarchais-Crawford	Borough councillor	André Savard	Montreal Island Citizens Union

Note: The Montreal Island Citizens Union changed its name to Union Montreal in 2007.

- Marc Touchette served on the borough council from 2005 to 2009 and was a member of its public safety committee. He did not seek re-election in 2009. He ran for Montreal city council in the 2013 municipal election as a candidate of Option Verdun/Montréal and was defeated. Touchette was also elected to the Commission scolaire Marguerite-Bourgeoys in 2003 and was re-elected in 2007. As of 2013, he served on the commission's governance and ethics committee. He did not seek re-election as a trustee in 2014.

=== 2002–05 ===
District	Position	Name	Party
—	City councillor (three members, at large)	Georges Bossé	Montreal Island Citizens Union
—	City councillor (three members, at large)	Laurent Dugas	Montreal Island Citizens Union (2002–04)
—	City councillor (three members, at large)	Laurent Dugas	Independent (2004–05)
—	City councillor (three members, at large)	Claude Trudel	Montreal Island Citizens Union
Champlain	Borough councillor	Ginette Marotte	Montreal Island Citizens Union
Desmarchais-Crawford	Borough councillor	John Gallagher	Montreal Island Citizens Union

- John Gallagher (1929–January 1, 2016) was a Verdun city councillor for many years prior to the city's amalgamation with Montreal, having been elected in 1985, 1989, 1993, and 1997. He served on the borough council for one term from 2002 to 2005 before retiring.
