= 2017 Montreal municipal election =

Election in Quebec, Canada

- November 5, 2017
- Mayoral election
- November 5, 2017
- Registered: 1,142,948
- Turnout: 42.47%
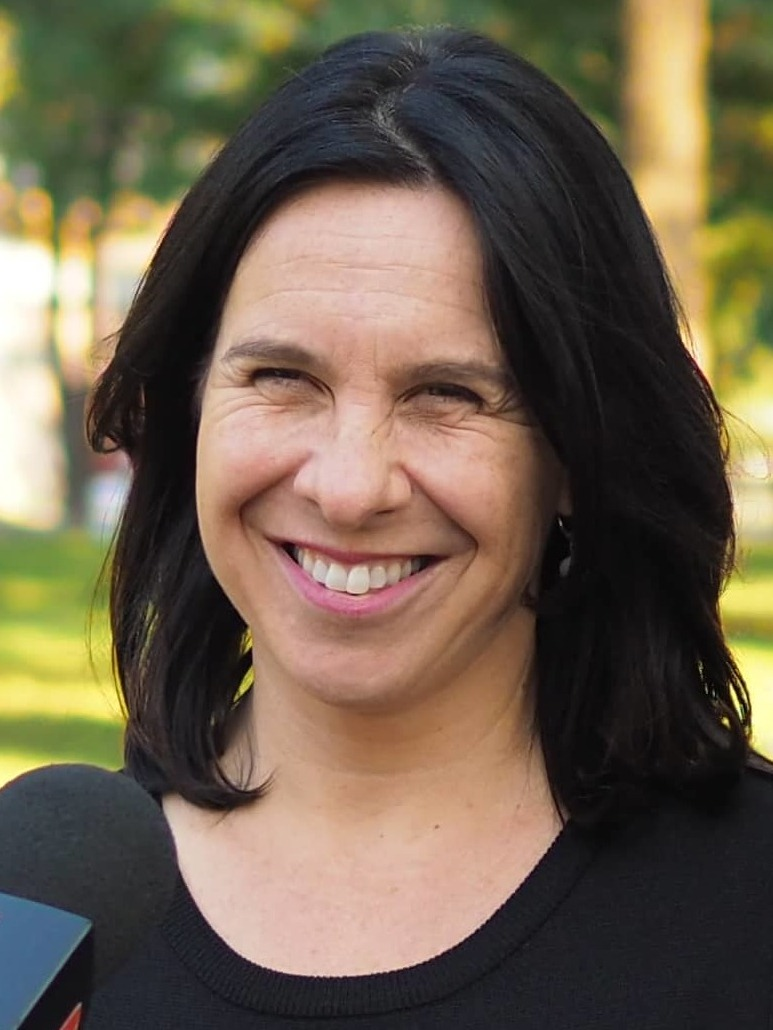

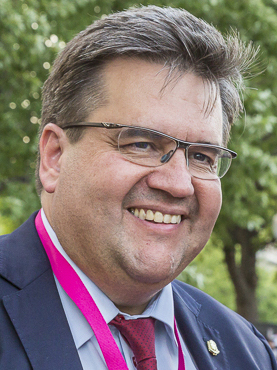
Nominee	Valérie Plante	Denis Coderre
Party	Projet Montréal	Ensemble Montréal
Popular vote	243,594	216,321
Percentage	51.42%	45.66%
Mayor before election
Denis Coderre
Équipe Denis Coderre
Elected mayor
Valérie Plante
Projet Montréal
- City Council election
- November 5, 2017
- 65 seats on Montreal City Council (Note: The mayor is a member of the city council but for the purposes of documentation is treated as their own individual.); 33 seats needed for a majority
Party	Leader	Seats	+/–
Projet Montréal	Valérie Plante	34	+14
Équipe Denis Coderre	Denis Coderre	25	−2
Équipe Barbe	Manon Barbe	3	+1
Équipe Anjou	Luis Miranda	2	0
Coalition Montréal	Jean Fortier	1	−5
This lists parties that won seats. See the complete results below.

Municipal elections were held in the city of Montreal, Quebec, Canada, on November 5, 2017, as part of the 2017 Quebec municipal elections. Voters elected 65 positions on the Montreal City Council, including the mayor, borough mayors, and city councillors, as well as 38 borough councillors.

== Results ==
Results for borough mayor

Results for city councillor

Results for borough councillor

Despite early polls giving incumbent mayor Denis Coderre a comfortable lead, the election concluded with Valérie Plante of Projet Montréal winning the mayoralty race by a margin of over 27,000 votes. Plante became the first woman to lead Montreal in its 375-year history. She also became the first Projet Montréal candidate to be elected mayor of Montreal. Her party won a majority of the city council, electing 34 of 65 councillors.

Projet Montréal won unanimous control of four borough councils and majorities on seven more. Équipe Denis Coderre pour Montréal won unanimous control of four borough councils and majorities on two more. The two remaining boroughs, Anjou and LaSalle, were won unanimously by local parties, Équipe Anjou and Équipe Barbe Team respectively.

Several key city council figures were defeated, such as Russell Copeman, Harout Chitilian, Claude Dauphin, Anie Samson, Réal Ménard and Elsie Lefebvre. Projet Montréal founder Richard Bergeron, who had crossed the floor to Équipe Coderre, was defeated by the candidate for his former party, Robert Beaudry.

Following his defeat, Denis Coderre announced he would resign from political life, leaving his city council seat to his co-candidate Chantal Rossi. On November 9, members of his party elected Darlington councillor Lionel Perez as leader; it was also announced that the party, named for Coderre, would change name in the coming weeks.

Coalition Montréal was left with only one remaining elected official, Montreal's longest-serving city councillor Marvin Rotrand. Vrai changement pour Montréal, which had come in second in the mayoralty race in the previous election, lost all its seats, and announced it would suspend its activities.

For the first time, a majority of Montreal's elected officials (53 out of 103) were women. Six of the 103 elected officials (5.8%), including four of the 65 members of the city council, declared themselves to be members of visible minorities. Visible minorities make up a third of the population of the city. Another elected official, Champlain–L'Île-des-Soeurs city councillor Marie-Josée Parent, who is of Mi'kmaq ancestry, became the first indigenous person elected to Montreal city council.

The official results were released on November 8, 2017. There was one request for a recount, in the race for borough councillor for La Pointe-des-Prairies in Rivière-des-Prairies–Pointe-aux-Trembles, in which Lisa Christensen of Projet Montréal had been announced as the winner with a lead of 32 votes. The recount was conducted by a judge of the Court of Quebec and Ms. Christensen was confirmed as the winner by a majority of 30 votes. This was also the first mayoral election since 2005 in which the winning candidate won more than 50% of the vote.

=== Composition of city and borough councils ===
Depending on their borough, Montrealers voted for:

- Mayor of Montreal
- Borough mayor (except in Ville-Marie, whose mayor is the Mayor of Montreal), who is also a city councillor
- A city councillor for the whole borough (Anjou and Lachine only) or for each district, who is also a borough councillor (Outremont and L'Île-Bizard–Sainte-Geneviève have no city councillors other than the borough mayor)
- Zero, one, or two additional borough councillors for each district

Borough	District				
Borough	District	City Councillors		Borough Councillor	Borough Councillor
Borough	District	Borough Mayor	City Councillor	Borough Councillor	Borough Councillor
Ahuntsic-Cartierville	Ahuntsic	Émilie Thuillier	Nathalie Goulet		
Ahuntsic-Cartierville	Bordeaux-Cartierville	Émilie Thuillier	Effie Giannou		
Ahuntsic-Cartierville	Saint-Sulpice	Émilie Thuillier	Hadrien Parizeau		
Ahuntsic-Cartierville	Sault-au-Récollet	Émilie Thuillier	Jérôme Normand		
Anjou	Centre	Luis Miranda	Andrée Hénault	Kristine Marsolais	
Anjou	East	Luis Miranda	Andrée Hénault	Richard Leblanc	
Anjou	West	Luis Miranda	Andrée Hénault	Lynne Shand	
Côte-des-Neiges– Notre-Dame-de-Grâce	Côte-des-Neiges	Sue Montgomery	Magda Popeanu		
Côte-des-Neiges– Notre-Dame-de-Grâce	Darlington	Sue Montgomery	Lionel Perez		
Côte-des-Neiges– Notre-Dame-de-Grâce	Loyola	Sue Montgomery	Christian Arseneault		
Côte-des-Neiges– Notre-Dame-de-Grâce	Notre-Dame-de-Grâce	Sue Montgomery	Peter McQueen		
Côte-des-Neiges– Notre-Dame-de-Grâce	Snowdon	Sue Montgomery	Marvin Rotrand		
L'Île-Bizard– Sainte-Geneviève	Denis-Benjamin-Viger	Normand Marinacci		Christian Larocque	
L'Île-Bizard– Sainte-Geneviève	Jacques-Bizard	Normand Marinacci		Robert Samoszewski	
L'Île-Bizard– Sainte-Geneviève	Pierre-Foretier	Normand Marinacci		Yves Sarault	
L'Île-Bizard– Sainte-Geneviève	Sainte-Geneviève	Normand Marinacci		Suzanne Marceau	
Lachine	Du Canal	Maja Vodanovic	Micheline Rouleau	Julie-Pascale Provost	
Lachine	Fort-Rolland	Maja Vodanovic	Micheline Rouleau	Michèle Flannery	
Lachine	J.-Émery-Provost	Maja Vodanovic	Micheline Rouleau	Younes Boukala	
LaSalle	Cecil-P.-Newman	Manon Barbe	Lise Zarac	Serge Declos	Josée Troilo
LaSalle	Sault-Saint-Louis	Manon Barbe	Richard Deschamps	Laura Palestini	Nancy Blanchet
Mercier– Hochelaga-Maisonneuve	Hochelaga	Pierre Lessard-Blais	Éric Alan Caldwell		
Mercier– Hochelaga-Maisonneuve	Louis-Riel	Pierre Lessard-Blais	Karine Boivin Roy		
Mercier– Hochelaga-Maisonneuve	Maisonneuve–Longue-Pointe	Pierre Lessard-Blais	Laurence Lavigne Lalonde		
Mercier– Hochelaga-Maisonneuve	Tétreaultville	Pierre Lessard-Blais	Suzie Miron		
Montréal-Nord	Marie-Clarac	Christine Black	Abdelhaq Sari	Jean Marc Poirier	
Montréal-Nord	Ovide-Clermont	Christine Black	Chantal Rossi	Renée-Chantal Belinga	
Outremont	Claude-Ryan	Philipe Tomlinson		Mindy Pollak	
Outremont	Jeanne-Sauvé	Philipe Tomlinson		Fanny Magini	
Outremont	Joseph-Beaubien	Philipe Tomlinson		Valérie Patreau	
Outremont	Robert-Bourassa	Philipe Tomlinson		Jean-Marc Corbeil	
Pierrefonds-Roxboro	Bois-de-Liesse	Dimitrios Jim Beis	Benoit Langevin	Louise Leroux	
Pierrefonds-Roxboro	Cap-Saint-Jacques	Dimitrios Jim Beis	Catherine Clément-Talbot	Yves Gignac	
Le Plateau-Mont-Royal	De Lorimier	Luc Ferrandez	Marianne Giguère	Josefina Blanco	
Le Plateau-Mont-Royal	Jeanne-Mance	Luc Ferrandez	Alex Norris	Maeva Vilain	
Le Plateau-Mont-Royal	Mile-End	Luc Ferrandez	Richard Ryan	Marie Plourde	
Rivière-des-Prairies– Pointe-aux-Trembles	La Pointe-aux-Prairies	Chantal Rouleau	Richard Guay	Lisa Christensen	
Rivière-des-Prairies– Pointe-aux-Trembles	Pointe-aux-Trembles	Chantal Rouleau	Suzanne Décarie	Gilles Déziel	
Rivière-des-Prairies– Pointe-aux-Trembles	Rivière-des-Prairies	Chantal Rouleau	Giovanni Rapanà	Nathalie Pierre-Antoine	
Rosemont– La Petite-Patrie	Étienne-Desmarteau	François William Croteau	Stéphanie Watt		
Rosemont– La Petite-Patrie	Marie-Victorin	François William Croteau	Jocelyn Pauzé		
Rosemont– La Petite-Patrie	Saint-Édouard	François William Croteau	François Limoges		
Rosemont– La Petite-Patrie	Vieux-Rosemont	François William Croteau	Christine Gosselin		
Saint-Laurent	Côte-de-Liesse	Alan DeSousa	Francesco Miele	Jacques Cohen	
Saint-Laurent	Norman-McLaren	Alan DeSousa	Aref Salem	Michèle Biron	
Saint-Léonard	Saint-Léonard-Est	Michel Bissonnet	Patricia Lattanzio	Lili-Anne Tremblay	
Saint-Léonard	Saint-Léonard-Ouest	Michel Bissonnet	Dominic Perri	Mario Battista	
Le Sud-Ouest	Saint-Henri-Est–Petite-Bourgogne– Pointe-Saint-Charles-Griffintown	Benoit Dorais	Craig Sauvé	Sophie Thiébaut	
Le Sud-Ouest	Saint-Paul–Émard– Saint-Henri-Ouest	Benoit Dorais	Anne-Marie Sigouin	Alain Vaillancourt	
Verdun	Champlain–L'Île-des-Sœurs	Jean-François Parenteau	Marie-Josée Parent	Pierre L'Heureux	Véronique Tremblay
Verdun	Desmarchais-Crawford	Jean-François Parenteau	Sterling Downey	Luc Gagnon	Marie-Andrée Mauger
Ville-Marie	Peter-McGill	(Mayor of Montreal)	Cathy Wong		
Ville-Marie	Saint-Jacques	(Mayor of Montreal)	Robert Beaudry		
Ville-Marie	Sainte-Marie	(Mayor of Montreal)	Sophie Mauzerolle		
Villeray–Saint-Michel– Parc-Extension	François-Perrault	Giuliana Fumagalli	Sylvain Ouellet		
Villeray–Saint-Michel– Parc-Extension	Parc-Extension	Giuliana Fumagalli	Mary Deros		
Villeray–Saint-Michel– Parc-Extension	Saint-Michel	Giuliana Fumagalli	Frantz Benjamin		
Villeray–Saint-Michel– Parc-Extension	Villeray	Giuliana Fumagalli	Rosannie Filato		

== Timeline ==
=== 2014 ===
- May 5 - Borough councillors Lucie Cardyn and Jacqueline Gremaud leave Équipe conservons Outremont to sit as independents.
- May 25 - Death of Marcel Côté, leader of Coalition Montréal.
- June 16 - Borough mayor Benoit Dorais becomes leader of Coalition Montréal.
- September 5 - Resignation of Mélanie Joly as leader of Vrai changement pour Montréal, replaced by city councillor Lorraine Pagé
- October 27 - Resignation of Richard Bergeron as leader of Projet Montréal, replaced by borough mayor Luc Ferrandez
- November 18 - City councillor Richard Bergeron leaves Projet Montréal to sit as independent.
- December 12 - Resignation of Lucie Cardyn as borough councillor of Robert-Bourassa

=== 2015 ===
- March 17 - City councillor Steve Shanahan announces his candidacy for Conservative Party of Canada in Ville-Marie—Le Sud-Ouest—Île-des-Sœurs and is expelled from Vrai changement pour Montréal.
- March 22 - In a by-election, Marie Potvin (Équipe Denis Coderre pour Montréal) is elected borough councillor of Robert-Bourassa with 37% of the vote.
- June 15 - Borough councillors Michelle Di Genova Zammit (Équipe Anjou) and Éric Dugas (Équipe Richard Bélanger) leave their parties to join Équipe Denis Coderre pour Montréal.
- June 23 - Death of Domenico Moschella, city councillor of Saint-Léonard-Est.
- August 6 - City councillor Marc-André Gadoury leaves Projet Montréal to join Équipe Denis Coderre pour Montréal.
- September 8 - City councillor Érika Duchesne leaves Projet Montréal to sit as independent.
- September 16 - City councillor Jean-François Cloutier leaves Équipe Dauphin Lachine to sit as independent.
- November 15 - In a by-election, Patricia Lattanzio (Équipe Denis Coderre pour Montréal) is elected city councillor of Saint-Léonard-Est with 83.7% of the vote.
- December 16 - City councillor Lorraine Pagé leaves Vrai changement pour Montréal to sit as independent.
- December 22 - City councillor Justine McIntyre becomes leader of Vrai changement pour Montréal.

=== 2016 ===
- January 7 - Resignation of Gilles Deguire as borough mayor of Montréal-Nord, replaced by city councillor Chantal Rossi
- January 18 - City councillor Steve Shanahan (independent) rejoins Vrai changement pour Montréal.
- March 17 - City councillor Érika Duchesne (independent) joins Équipe Denis Coderre pour Montréal.
- April 24 - In a by-election, Christine Black (Équipe Denis Coderre pour Montréal) is elected borough mayor of Montréal-Nord with 68.6% of the vote.
- November 4 - Borough mayor Russell Copeman leaves Coalition Montréal to join Équipe Denis Coderre pour Montréal.
- November 6 - City councillor Richard Bergeron (independent) joins Équipe Denis Coderre pour Montréal.
- November 28 - Borough councillor Maja Vodanovic leaves Équipe Dauphin Lachine to sit as independent.
- December 4 - City councillor Valérie Plante is elected leader of Projet Montréal with 51.9% of the vote.
- December 26 - Borough mayor Benoit Dorais leaves Coalition Montréal to sit as independent.
- December 29 - City councillor Marvin Rotrand becomes interim leader of Coalition Montréal.

=== 2017 ===
- January 23 - Borough councillor Maja Vodanovic (independent) joins Projet Montréal.
- March 29 - Borough mayor Réal Ménard leaves Coalition Montréal to join Équipe Denis Coderre pour Montréal.
- May 29 - City councillors Lorraine Pagé (independent) and Jean-François Cloutier (independent) and borough councillor Kimberley Simonyik (Équipe Dauphin Lachine) join Équipe Denis Coderre pour Montréal.
- May 31 - Borough mayor Benoit Dorais (independent) joins Projet Montréal.
- June 11 - City councillor Elsie Lefebvre leaves Coalition Montréal to sit as independent.
- June 28 - Borough mayor Normand Marinacci and borough councillors Christian Larocque and Jean-Dominic Lévesque-René leave Vrai changement pour Montréal to join Projet Montréal.
- August 23 - City councillor Elsie Lefebvre (independent) joins Équipe Denis Coderre pour Montréal.
- September 20 - Borough councillor Gilles Beaudry leaves Équipe Anjou to sit as independent.
- September 22 - Official beginning of the electoral campaign
- October 17 - Jean Fortier, mayoral candidate for Coalition Montréal, announces that he is abandoning his campaign for mayor of Montreal. However, his name will remain on the ballot. He endorses Valérie Plante of Projet Montréal for mayor.
- October 19 - French mayoral debate opposing Denis Coderre and Valérie Plante
- October 23 - English mayoral debate opposing Denis Coderre and Valérie Plante
- October 29 - Advance poll with a turnout of 6.54% of the registered electors

== Incumbent mayors and councillors who did not run for re-election ==
Équipe Denis Coderre pour Montréal

- Maurice Cohen, borough councillor, Côte-de-Liesse, Saint-Laurent
- Pierre Desrochers, city councillor, Saint-Sulpice, Ahuntsic-Cartierville
- Pierre Gagnier, borough mayor, Ahuntsic-Cartierville
- Manon Gauthier, city councillor, Champlain–L'Île-des-Sœurs, Verdun
- Jean-Marc Gibeau, city councillor, Ovide-Clermont, Montréal-Nord
- Sylvia Lo Bianco, borough councillor, Ovide-Clermont, Montréal-Nord
- Monica Ricourt, borough councillor, Marie-Clarac, Montréal-Nord

Projet Montréal

- Guillaume Lavoie, city councillor, Marie-Victorin, Rosemont–La Petite-Patrie
- Jean-Dominic Lévesque-René, borough councillor, Jacques-Bizard, L'Île-Bizard–Sainte-Geneviève
- Louise Mainville, city councillor, De Lorimier, Le Plateau Mont-Royal

Équipe Anjou

- Paul-Yvon Perron, borough councillor, East district, Anjou

Independent

- Marie Cinq-Mars, borough mayor, Outremont

== Opinion polls ==
Polling firm	Last date of polling	Link	Équipe Coderre	Projet Montréal	Vrai changement	Coalition Montréal	Other	Undecided	Sample size
CROP	October 24, 2017	Web	37	39			2	17	1,094
Leger	October 22, 2017	Web	38	38			3	21	500
Mainstreet	September 22, 2017	PDF	30	25		3		41	500
Leger	June 19, 2017	PDF	43	29			14		2,013
Leger	November 1, 2015	PDF	57	13	6	5		15	600
2013 Election	November 3, 2013		32.1	25.5	26.5	12.8	3.1		464,966

== Seat-by-seat results ==
=== Mayoral race ===
Although Jean Fortier of Coalition Montréal abandoned his campaign for mayor on October 17, 2017, and endorsed Valérie Plante, his name officially remained on the ballot.

Party	Candidate	Vote	%
Projet Montréal - Équipe Valérie Plante	Valérie Plante	243,594	51.42
Équipe Denis Coderre pour Montréal	Denis Coderre	216,321	45.66
Coalition Montréal	Jean Fortier	5,948	1.26
Independent	Bernard Gurberg	2,140	0.45
Independent	Gilbert Thibodeau	1,669	0.35
Independent	Fabrice Ntompa Ilunga	1,553	0.33
Independent	Philippe Tessier	1,319	0.28
Independent	Tyler Lemco	1,189	0.25
Eligible voters		1,142,948	100.00
Turnout		485,365	42.47
Rejected ballots (as percentage of turnout)		11,632	2.40

=== Ahuntsic-Cartierville ===
Electoral District	Eligible voters	Position	Turnout	Candidates			Incumbent	Result
Electoral District	Eligible voters	Position	Turnout	Équipe Coderre	Projet Montréal	Coalition Montréal	Incumbent	Result
—	87,651	Borough mayor	47.18%	Harout Chitilian; 19,031 (47.52%)	Émilie Thuillier; 21,017 (52.48%)		Pierre Gagnier	PM gain from EDC
Ahuntsic	22,009	City councillor	52.58%	Raphaël Melançon; 4,432 (39.35%)	Nathalie Goulet; 6,248 (55.46%)	Pierre Lachapelle; 585 (5.19%)	Émilie Thuillier	PM hold
Bordeaux-Cartierville	21,653	City councillor	42.20%	Effie Giannou; 5,277 (59.89%)	Fadia Nassr; 3,048 (34.59%)	Shant Karabajak; 486 (5.52%)	Harout Chitilian	EDC hold
Saint-Sulpice	23,313	City councillor	43.58%	Hadrien Parizeau; 5,276 (53.74%)	Ramzi Sfeir; 4,541 (46.26%)		Pierre Desrochers	EDC hold
Sault-au-Récollet	20,676	City councillor	50.28%	Lorraine Pagé; 4,526 (44.90%)	Jérôme Normand; 4,980 (49.40%)	Giovanna Giancaspro; 574 (5.69%)	Lorraine Pagé	PM gain from EDC

=== Anjou ===
Electoral District	Eligible voters	Position	Turnout	Candidates				Incumbent	Result
Electoral District	Eligible voters	Position	Turnout	Équipe Coderre	Projet Montréal	Équipe Anjou	Independent	Incumbent	Result
—	29,577	Borough mayor	48.67%	Angela Mancini; 3,511 (23.35%)	Rémy Tondreau; 2,823 (20.38%)	Luis Miranda; 7,518 (54.27%)		Luis Miranda	EA hold
—	29,577	City councillor	48.63%	Michèle Gagné; 3,995 (28.94%)	Robert Mailhot; 3,266 (23.66%)	Andrée Hénault; 6,542 (47.40%)		Andrée Hénault	EA hold
Centre	10,944	Borough councillor	51.49%	Michelle Di Genova Zammit; 1,939 (36.02%)	Julie De Martino; 1,315 (24.43%)	Kristine Marsolais; 2,129 (39.55%)		Michelle Di Genova Zammit	EA gain from EDC
East	8,880	Borough councillor	45.48%	Mario Robert; 1,029 (26.32%)	Sylvain Plourde; 949 (24.27%)	Richard Leblanc; 1,724 (44.09%)	Nadia Ghalem; 208 (5.32%)	Paul-Yvon Perron	EA hold
West	9,753	Borough councillor	48.23%	René Gauthier; 1,267 (28.16%)	Stephanie Cambria; 1,230 (27.34%)	Lynne Shand; 1,663 (36.96%)	Gilles Beaudry; 339 (7.54%)	Gilles Beaudry	EA gain from Ind.

=== Côte-des-Neiges–Notre-Dame-de-Grâce ===
Electoral District	Eligible voters	Position	Turnout	Candidates				Incumbent	Result
Electoral District	Eligible voters	Position	Turnout	Équipe Coderre	Projet Montréal	Coalition Montréal	Other	Incumbent	Result
—	99,094	Borough mayor	38.99%	Russell Copeman; 16,409 (43.77%)	Sue Montgomery; 17,839 (47.58%)	Zaki Ghavitian; 3,241 (8.65%)		Russell Copeman	PM gain from EDC
Côte-des-Neiges	17,332	City councillor	37.90%	Tiffany Callender; 2,341 (36.52%)	Magda Popeanu; 3,518 (54.88)	Raphaël Assor; 395 (6.16%)	Maureen Chin (VCM); 156 (2.43%)	Magda Popeanu	PM hold
Darlington	18,076	City councillor	35.76%	Lionel Perez; 2,576 (41.72%)	Graham Carpenter; 1,969 (31.89%)	Erik Hamon; 1,630 (26.40%)		Lionel Perez	EDC hold
Loyola	21,750	City councillor	39.59%	Gabriel Retta; 2,654 (31.53%)	Christian Arseneault; 3,611 (42.90%)	Keeton Clarke; 310 (3.68%)	Jeremy Searle (Ind.); 1,012 (12.02%); Gianpaolo Trani (Ind.); 645 (7.66%); Angeluz Valery Santillan Aguirre (Ind.); 186 (2.21%)	Jeremy Searle	PM gain from Ind.
Notre-Dame-de-Grâce	21,987	City councillor	45.65%	Elaine Ethier; 3,015 (30.45%)	Peter McQueen; 6,529 (65.95%)	Caroline Orchard; 356 (3.60%)		Peter McQueen	PM hold
Snowdon	19,949	City councillor	34.57%	Salvador Cabugao; 1,647 (24.57%)	Irina Maria Grecu; 2,240 (33.42%)	Marvin Rotrand; 2,816 (42.01%)		Marvin Rotrand	CM hold

=== L'Île-Bizard–Sainte-Geneviève ===
Electoral District	Eligible voters	Position	Turnout	Candidates				Incumbent	Result
Electoral District	Eligible voters	Position	Turnout	Équipe Coderre	Projet Montréal	VCM	Independent	Incumbent	Result
—	13,890	Borough mayor	53.29%	Éric Dugas; 2,608 (35.91%)	Normand Marinacci; 3,096 (42.63%)	Stéphane Côté; 1,558 (21.45%)		Normand Marinacci	PM hold
Denis-Benjamin-Viger	3,776	Borough councillor	57.15%	Alain Wilson; 777 (36.46%)	Christian Larocque; 990 (46.46%)	Stéphane Ritchot; 364 (17.08%)		Christian Larocque	PM hold
Jacques-Bizard	3,343	Borough councillor	55.67%	Richard Bélanger; 707 (39.08%)	Robert Samoszewski; 770 (42.56%)	Marie-Ève Dubé; 332 (18.35%)		Jean-Dominic Lévesque-René	PM hold
Pierre-Foretier	4,162	Borough councillor	54.71%	Diane Gibb; 749 (33.51%)	Yves Sarault; 857 (38.34%)	Frédérick Pageau; 462 (20.67%)	Ghassan Baroudi; 167 (7.47%)	Stéphane Côté	PM gain from VCM
Sainte-Geneviève	2,609	Borough councillor	42.35%	Suzanne Marceau; 479 (44.98%)	Geneviève Labrosse; 439 (41.22%)	Sherry Shaban; 147 (13.80%)		Éric Dugas	EDC hold

=== Lachine ===
Electoral District	Eligible voters	Position	Turnout	Candidates				Incumbent	Result
Electoral District	Eligible voters	Position	Turnout	Équipe Coderre	Projet Montréal	VCM	Équipe Dauphin	Incumbent	Result
—	32,351	Borough mayor	47.41%	Catherine Ménard; 2,199 (14.66%)	Maja Vodanovic; 5,935 (39.57%)	Bernard Blanchet; 3,216 (21.44%)	Claude Dauphin; 3,649 (24.33%)	Claude Dauphin	PM gain from EDL
—	32,351	City councillor	47.18%	Jean-François Cloutier; 3,029 (20.50%)	Micheline Rouleau; 6,096 (41.26%)	Elizabeth Verge; 2,710 (18.34%)	Julie Ramsay; 2,940 (19.90%)	Jean-François Cloutier	PM gain from EDC
Du Canal	11,559	Borough councillor	42.77%	Anne-Marie Lelièvre; 676 (14.30%)	Julie-Pascale Provost; 1,878 (39.73%)	Marc Hétu; 1,345 (28.45%)	Johanne Haines; 828 (17.52%)	Maja Vodanovic	PM hold
Fort-Rolland	10,362	Borough councillor	59.03%	Kymberley Simonyik; 1,034 (17.22%)	Michèle Flannery; 2,642 (44.00%)	Stéphanie Poitras; 663 (11.04%)	Dominic Rossi; 1,665 (27.73%)	Kymberley Simonyik	PM gain from EDC
J.-Émery-Provost	10,430	Borough councillor	40.35%	Mehdi Lama; 656 (16.01%)	Younes Boukala; 1,577 (38.49%)	Christian Lejeune; 1,035 (25.26%)	Daniel Racicot; 829 (20.23%)	Daniel Racicot	PM gain from EDL

=== LaSalle ===
Electoral District	Eligible voters	Position	Turnout	Candidates				Incumbent	Result
Electoral District	Eligible voters	Position	Turnout	Équipe Coderre	Projet Montréal	Équipe Barbe	Independent	Incumbent	Result
—	53,533	Borough mayor	39.03%	Monique Vallée; 4,212 (20.87%)	Kathy Landry; 4,840 (23.98%)	Manon Barbe; 11,129 (55.15%)		Manon Barbe	Barbe hold
Cecil-P.-Newman	26,682	City councillor	35.87%	Pino Asaro; 2,900 (31.86%)	Yasmina El Babarti Jimenez; 2,373 (26.07%)	Lise Zarac; 3,360 (36.92%)	Carolina Caruso; 468 (5.14%)	Monique Vallée	Barbe gain from EDC
Cecil-P.-Newman	26,682	Borough councillor I	35.91%	Devinderpal Singh; 2,482 (27.29%)	Anila Erindi; 2,566 (28.21%)	Serge Declos; 4,048 (44.50%)		Serge Declos	Barbe hold
Cecil-P.-Newman	26,682	Borough councillor II	35.96%	Steven Laperrière; 2,486 (27.36%)	Romarick Okou; 2,243 (24.69%)	Josée Troilo; 3,893 (42.85%)	Mody Maka Barry; 463 (5.10%)	Josée Troilo	Barbe hold
Sault-Saint-Louis	26,851	City councillor	42.07%	Ben Lumière Moussienza; 2,240 (20.60%)	Loren Dafniotis; 2,999 (27.58%)	Richard Deschamps; 5,636 (51.83%)		Richard Deschamps	Barbe hold
Sault-Saint-Louis	26,851	Borough councillor I	42.02%	Josée Aumont-Blanchette; 2,613 (24.07%)	Alex Lauzon; 3,243 (29.87%)	Laura Palestini; 5,000 (46.06%)		Nancy Blanchet	Barbe hold
Sault-Saint-Louis	26,851	Borough councillor II	42.10%	Balkis Imam; 1,986 (18.28%)	Roxanne Gendron; 3,289 (30.28%)	Nancy Blanchet; 5,588 (51.44%)		Laura-Ann Palestini	Barbe hold

=== Mercier–Hochelaga-Maisonneuve ===
Electoral District	Eligible voters	Position	Turnout	Candidates			Incumbent	Result
Electoral District	Eligible voters	Position	Turnout	Équipe Coderre	Projet Montréal	Coalition Montréal	Incumbent	Result
—	98,948	Borough mayor	44.81%	Réal Ménard; 19,427 (44.96%)	Pierre Lessard-Blais; 23,779 (55.04%)		Réal Ménard	PM gain from EDC
Hochelaga	24,419	City councillor	43.06%	Jean-François Beaupré; 2,922 (28.51%)	Éric Alan Caldwell; 7,326 (71.49%)		Éric Alan Caldwell	PM hold
Louis-Riel	22,262	City councillor	45.43%	Karine Boivin Roy; 5,180 (52.76%)	Isi Meza; 4,386 (44.67%)	Joao Neves; 252 (2.57%)	Karine Boivin Roy	EDC hold
Maisonneuve–Longue-Pointe	25,647	City councillor	44.48%	Simon-Robert Chartrand; 4,008 (36.15%)	Laurence Lavigne Lalonde; 7,077 (63.85%)		Laurence Lavigne Lalonde	PM hold
Tétreaultville	26,620	City councillor	46.18%	Richard Celzi; 4,894 (41.81%)	Suzie Miron; 6,937 (58.19%)		Richard Celzi	PM gain from EDC

=== Montréal-Nord ===
Electoral District	Eligible voters	Position	Turnout	Candidates			Incumbent	Result
Electoral District	Eligible voters	Position	Turnout	Équipe Coderre	Projet Montréal	Other	Incumbent	Result
—	53,662	Borough mayor	35.40%	Christine Black; 11,864 (66.28%)	Balarama Holness; 6,036 (33.72%)		Christine Black	EDC hold
Marie-Clarac	28,314	City councillor	36.20%	Abdelhaq Sari; 4,881 (50.80%)	Mathieu Léonard; 4,015 (41.79%)	Marie-Carmel Michel (Ind.); 712 (7.41%)	Chantal Rossi	EDC hold
Marie-Clarac	28,314	Borough councillor	36.33%	Jean Marc Poirier; 5,180 (53.74%)	Anastasia Marcelin; 3,551 (36.84%)	Elaine Bissonnette (Ind.); 571 (5.92%); Henri-Paul Bernier (Ind.); 337 (3.50%)	Monica Ricourt	EDC hold
Ovide-Clermont	25,348	City councillor	34.34%	Chantal Rossi; Co-candidate for Denis Coderre; 5,409 (65.47%)	Sacha-Wilky Merazil; 2,853 (34.53%)		Jean-Marc Gibeau	EDC hold
Ovide-Clermont	25,348	Borough councillor	34.29%	Renée-Chantal Belinga; 4,985 (61.95%)	Stéphanie Casimir; 3,062 (38.05%)		Sylvia Lo Bianco	EDC hold

=== Outremont ===
Electoral District	Eligible voters	Position	Turnout	Candidates				Incumbent	Result
Electoral District	Eligible voters	Position	Turnout	Équipe Coderre	Projet Montréal	Coalition Montréal	Independent	Incumbent	Result
—	15,371	Borough mayor	58.29%	Marie Potvin; 2,800 (31,69%)	Philipe Tomlinson; 4,197 (47.50%)	Ronald Moroz; 68 (0.77%)	Alexandre Lussier; 1,770 (20.03%)	Marie Cinq-Mars	PM gain from Ind.
Claude-Ryan	3,965	Borough councillor	59.67%	Jeremy Murray; 449 (20.95%)	Mindy Pollak; 1,186 (55.34%)		Chantal Raymond; 508 (23.71%)	Mindy Pollak	PM hold
Jeanne-Sauvé	3,794	Borough councillor	56.14%	Christine Gélinas-Élie; 711 (34.07%)	Fanny Magini; 851 (40.78%)	Adrien Mitchell; 18 (0.86%)	Jacqueline Gremaud; 507 (24.29%)	Jacqueline Gremaud	PM gain from Ind.
Joseph-Beaubien	4,210	Borough councillor	63.21%	William Habib; 390 (14.88%)	Valérie Patreau; 1,219 (46.51%)		Céline Forget; 1,012 (38.61%)	Céline Forget	PM gain from Ind.
Robert-Bourassa	3,402	Borough councillor	52.91%	Jean-Marc Corbeil; 818 (46.53%)	David DesBaillets; 665 (37.83%)		Frédéric Lecoq; 275 (15.64%)	Marie Potvin	EDC hold

=== Pierrefonds-Roxboro ===
Electoral District	Eligible voters	Position	Turnout	Candidates				Incumbent	Result
Electoral District	Eligible voters	Position	Turnout	Équipe Coderre	Projet Montréal	VCM	Independent	Incumbent	Result
—	48,154	Borough mayor	36.51%	Dimitrios Jim Beis; 7,918 (46.01%)	Hélène Dupont; 5,733 (33.31%)	Justine McIntyre; 3,558 (20.68%)		Dimitrios Jim Beis	EDC hold
Bois-de-Liesse	25,366	City councillor	36.84%	Benoit Langevin; 3,952 (43.55%)	Andréanne Martin; 3,466 (38.19%)	Eric McCarty; 1,657 (18.26%)		Justine McIntyre	EDC gain from VCM
Bois-de-Liesse	25,366	Borough councillor	36.88%	Louise Leroux; 4,056 (44.73%)	Alexis Audoin; 3,489 (38.48%)	Roger Trottier; 1,522 (16.79%)		Roger Trottier	EDC gain from VCM
Cap-Saint-Jacques	22,788	City councillor	36.05%	Catherine Clément-Talbot; 3,327 (41.28%)	Ross Stitt; 2,719 (33.73%)	Manuela de Paoli; 1,102 (13.67%)	Michael Labelle; 912 (11.32%)	Catherine Clément-Talbot	EDC hold
Cap-Saint-Jacques	22,788	Borough councillor	36.05%	Yves Gignac; 3,682 (45.79%)	Peter Papadogiannis; 3,319 (41.28%)	Naghmeh Shafiei; 1,040 (12.93%)		Yves Gignac	EDC hold

=== Le Plateau-Mont-Royal ===
Electoral District	Eligible voters	Position	Turnout	Candidates				Incumbent	Result
Electoral District	Eligible voters	Position	Turnout	Équipe Coderre	Projet Montréal	Coalition Montréal	Plateau sans frontières	Incumbent	Result
—	65,538	Borough mayor	47.87%	Zach Macklovitch; 10,438 (34.30%)	Luc Ferrandez; 19,997 (65.70%)		~~Michel Brûlé~~; Candidacy withdrawn	Luc Ferrandez	PM hold
De Lorimier	23,188	City councillor	52.42%	Linda Gauthier; 3,484 (29.16%)	Marianne Giguère; 8,415 (70.84%)		~~Audrey Morin~~; Candidacy withdrawn	Louise Mainville	PM hold
De Lorimier	23,188	Borough councillor	52.48%	Jean-Pierre Szaraz; 3,219 (27.11%)	Josefina Blanco; 8,656 (72.89%)		~~Caroline Moreno~~; Candidacy withdrawn	Marianne Giguère	PM hold
Jeanne-Mance	20,970	City councillor	42.12%	Marc-Antoine Desjardins; 2,763 (32.01%)	Alex Norris; 5,390 (62.43%)	Deborah Rankin; 338 (3.92%)	Joash Whyte; 142 (1.64%)	Alex Norris	PM hold
Jeanne-Mance	20,970	Borough councillor	42.27%	Daniel Loureiro; 2,754 (31.74%)	Maeva Vilain; 5,229 (60.26%)	Terrence Regan; 487 (5.61%)	Yvan Dias; 207 (2.39%)	Christine Gosselin	PM hold
Mile-End	21,380	City councillor	48.33%	Iris Almeida-Côté; 2,628 (26.08%)	Richard Ryan; 7,171 (71.15%)		Halil Sustam; 279 (2.77%)	Richard Ryan	PM hold
Mile-End	21,380	Borough councillor	48.30%	Jean David Prophète; 2,367 (23.51%)	Marie Plourde; 7,699 (76.49%)		~~Gabrielle Lebeau~~; Candidacy withdrawn	Marie Plourde	PM hold

=== Rivière-des-Prairies–Pointe-aux-Trembles ===
Electoral District	Eligible voters	Position	Turnout	Candidates			Incumbent	Result
Electoral District	Eligible voters	Position	Turnout	Équipe Coderre	Projet Montréal	Independent	Incumbent	Result
—	80,431	Borough mayor	42.39%	Chantal Rouleau; 18,861 (57.37%)	Pietro Mercuri; 14,013 (42.63%)		Chantal Rouleau	EDC hold
La Pointe-aux-Prairies	31,018	City councillor	41.72%	Richard Guay; 6,306 (50.33%)	Daphney Colin; 6,224 (49.67%)		Richard Guay	EDC hold
La Pointe-aux-Prairies	31,018	Borough councillor	41.76%	Manuel Guedes; 6,063 (48.45%)	Lisa Christensen; 6,093 (48.69%)	Alain Lanoue; 358 (2.86%)	Manuel Guedes	PM gain from EDC
Pointe-aux-Trembles	24,317	City councillor	45.87%	Suzanne Décarie; 5,947 (55.05%)	Tomy-Richard Leboeuf-McGregor; 4,856 (44.95%)		Suzanne Décarie	EDC hold
Pointe-aux-Trembles	24,317	Borough councillor	45.95%	Gilles Déziel; 5,768 (53.56%)	Vladimir Gelin; 5,001 (46.44%)		Gilles Déziel	EDC hold
Rivière-des-Prairies	25,096	City councillor	39.86%	Giovanni Rapanà; 5,749 (59.94%)	Hector Perlera; 3,836 (40.06%)		Giovanni Rapanà	EDC hold
Rivière-des-Prairies	25,096	Borough councillor	39.86%	Nathalie Pierre-Antoine; 5,733 (60.34%)	Jean-Eddie Jr Désiré; 3,768 (39.66%)		Nathalie Pierre-Antoine	EDC hold

=== Rosemont–La Petite-Patrie ===
Electoral District	Eligible voters	Position	Turnout	Candidates		Incumbent	Result
Electoral District	Eligible voters	Position	Turnout	Équipe Coderre	Projet Montréal	Incumbent	Result
—	99,459	Borough mayor	50.32%	Marc-André Gadoury; 15,452 (31.71%)	François Croteau; 33,275 (68.29%)	François Croteau	PM hold
Étienne-Desmarteau	23,307	City councillor	52.85%	Scott McKay; 3,928 (32.62%)	Stéphanie Watt; 8,113 (67.38%)	Marc-André Gadoury	PM gain from EDC
Marie-Victorin	23,259	City councillor	48.09%	Nathalie Fortin; 5,122 (47.37%)	Jocelyn Pauzé; 5,690 (52.63%)	Guillaume Lavoie	PM hold
Saint-Édouard	25,683	City councillor	49.77%	Jack Hallak; 2,813 (22.61%)	François Limoges; 9,626 (77.39%)	François Limoges	PM hold
Vieux-Rosemont	27,210	City councillor	50.52%	Mariam Laagad; 4,333 (32.46%)	Christine Gosselin; 9,014 (67.54%)	Érika Duchesne	PM gain from EDC

=== Saint-Laurent ===
Electoral District	Eligible voters	Position	Turnout	Candidates				Incumbent	Result
Electoral District	Eligible voters	Position	Turnout	Équipe Coderre	Projet Montréal	VCM	Independent	Incumbent	Result
—	61,623	Borough mayor	32.17%	Alan DeSousa; 12,877 (66.93%)	Nora Chénier-Jones; 6,363 (33.07%)			Alan DeSousa	EDC hold
Côte-de-Liesse	33,071	City councillor	32.83%	Francesco Miele; 7,171 (68.39%)	Salman Farah; 3,314 (31.61%)			Francesco Miele	EDC hold
Côte-de-Liesse	33,071	Borough councillor	32.82%	Jacques Cohen; 6,680 (63.59%)	Julio Rivera; 3,323 (31.64%)		Mario Bonenfant; 501 (4.77%)	Maurice Cohen	EDC hold
Norman-McLaren	28,552	City councillor	31.34%	Aref Salem; 4,887 (56.73%)	Julie Lamontagne; 3,727 (43.27%)			Aref Salem	EDC hold
Norman-McLaren	28,552	Borough councillor	31.37%	Michèle Biron; 4,847 (56.39%)	Rafik Hakim; 2,849 (33.15%)	Elias Bitar; 695 (8.09%)	Jamil Ahmad Gondal; 204 (2.37%)	Michèle Biron	EDC hold

=== Saint-Léonard ===
Electoral District	Eligible voters	Position	Turnout	Candidates			Incumbent	Result
Electoral District	Eligible voters	Position	Turnout	Équipe Coderre	Projet Montréal	Independent	Incumbent	Result
—	50,593	Borough mayor	37.42%	Michel Bissonnet; 11,651 (64.61%)	Julie Caron; 5,495 (30.47%)	Tommaso Di Paola; 888 (4.92%)	Michel Bissonnet	EDC hold
Saint-Léonard-Est	21,692	City councillor	38.79%	Patricia Lattanzio; 5,351 (67.45%)	Arij-Abrar El Korbi; 2,582 (32.55%)		Patricia Lattanzio	EDC hold
Saint-Léonard-Est	21,692	Borough councillor	38.80%	Lili-Anne Tremblay; 4,602 (58.61%)	Giovanni Capuano; 3,250 (41.39%)		Lili-Anne Tremblay	EDC hold
Saint-Léonard-Ouest	28,901	City councillor	36.38%	Dominic Perri; 6,632 (66.89%)	Oualid Frej; 3,283 (33.11%)		Dominic Perri	EDC hold
Saint-Léonard-Ouest	28,901	Borough councillor	36.36%	Mario Battista; 6,427 (64.41%)	Anick Druelle; 3,175 (31.82%)	Nickenson Aldonzar; 376 (3.77%)	Mario Battista	EDC hold

=== Le Sud-Ouest ===
Electoral District	Eligible voters	Position	Turnout	Candidates				Incumbent	Result
Electoral District	Eligible voters	Position	Turnout	Équipe Coderre	Projet Montréal	Coalition Montréal	Independent	Incumbent	Result
—	55,657	Borough mayor	40.44%	Denise Mérineau; 6,231 (28.59%)	Benoit Dorais; 15,567 (71.41%)			Benoit Dorais	PM hold
Saint-Henri-Est–Petite-Bourgogne–Pointe-Saint-Charles–Griffintown	30,537	City councillor	39.72%	Daniel Doyle; 3,763 (31.81%)	Craig Sauvé; 7,794 (65.88%)	Taimur Tanoli; 154 (1.30%)	Thomas Tsukalas; 119 (1.01%)	Craig Sauvé	PM hold
Saint-Henri-Est–Petite-Bourgogne–Pointe-Saint-Charles–Griffintown	30,537	Borough councillor	39.73%	Nicole Picher; 3,996 (33.85%)	Sophie Thiébaut; 7,808 (66.15%)			Sophie Thiébaut	PM hold
Saint-Paul–Émard–Saint-Henri-Ouest	25,120	City councillor	40.99%	Marc-Antoine Audette; 3,369 (33.95%)	Anne-Marie Sigouin; 6,553 (66.05%)			Anne-Marie Sigouin	PM hold
Saint-Paul–Émard–Saint-Henri-Ouest	25,120	Borough councillor	41.10%	Claudia Olga Ouamabia; 3,233 (32.53%)	Alain Vaillancourt; 6,705 (67.47%)			Alain Vaillancourt	PM hold

=== Verdun ===
Electoral District	Eligible voters	Position	Turnout	Candidates		Incumbent	Result
Electoral District	Eligible voters	Position	Turnout	Équipe Coderre	Projet Montréal	Incumbent	Result
—	49,529	Borough mayor	45.30%	Jean-François Parenteau; 11,925 (54.19%)	Michèle Chappaz; 10,082 (45.81%)	Jean-François Parenteau	EDC hold
Champlain– L'Île-des-Sœurs	27,348	City councillor	44.72%	Marie-Josée Parent; 6,265 (52.88%)	Nathalie Pedro; 5,582 (47.12%)	Manon Gauthier	EDC hold
Champlain– L'Île-des-Sœurs	27,348	Borough councillor I	44.70%	Pierre L'Heureux; 6,215 (52.50%)	Jean-Pierre Boivin; 5,623 (47.50%)	Pierre L'Heureux	EDC hold
Champlain– L'Île-des-Sœurs	27,348	Borough councillor II	44.69%	Véronique Tremblay; 6,264 (52.82%)	Gabriel Bégin; 5,596 (47.18%)	Marie-Eve Brunet	EDC hold
Desmarchais-Crawford	22,181	City councillor	46.00%	Marie-Eve Brunet; 4,203 (42.02%)	Sterling Downey; 5,799 (57.98%)	Sterling Downey	PM hold
Desmarchais-Crawford	22,181	Borough councillor I	46.11%	Ann Guy; 4,044 (40.40%)	Luc Gagnon; 5,967 (59.60%)	Luc Gagnon	PM hold
Desmarchais-Crawford	22,181	Borough councillor II	46.03%	Tracey Arial; 3,609 (36.10%)	Marie-Andrée Mauger; 6,388 (63.90%)	Marie-Andrée Mauger	PM hold

=== Ville-Marie ===
Electoral District	Eligible voters	Position	Turnout	Candidates					Incumbent	Result
Electoral District	Eligible voters	Position	Turnout	Équipe Coderre	Projet Montréal	VCM	Coalition Montréal	Independent	Incumbent	Result
Peter-McGill	18,591	City councillor	27.94%	Cathy Wong; 2,356 (46.32%)	Jabiz Sharifian; 1,709 (33.60%)	Steve Shanahan; 601 (11.82%)	John Symon; Co-candidate for Jean Fortier; 382 (7.51%)	Liyousa Kilani; 38 (0.75%)	Steve Shanahan	EDC gain from VCM
Saint-Jacques	21,320	City councillor	38.10%	Richard Bergeron; 3,642 (45.64%)	Robert Beaudry; 4,174 (52.31%)	Daniel Gaudreau; 164 (2.06%)			Richard Bergeron	PM gain from EDC
Sainte-Marie	18,385	City councillor	43.87%	Pierre Mainville; 2,460 (31.21%)	Sophie Mauzerolle; Co-candidate for Valérie Plante; 5,276 (66.95%)	Artur Adam Urbanowicz; 145 (1.84%)			Valérie Plante	PM hold

=== Villeray–Saint-Michel–Parc-Extension ===
Electoral District	Eligible voters	Position	Turnout	Candidates			Incumbent	Result
Electoral District	Eligible voters	Position	Turnout	Équipe Coderre	Projet Montréal	Other	Incumbent	Result
—	89,591	Borough mayor	41.29%	Anie Samson; 16,306 (45.93%)	Giuliana Fumagalli; 19,196 (54.07%)		Anie Samson	PM gain from EDC
François-Perrault	22,575	City councillor	39.21%	Érika Duchesne; 3,443 (40.79%)	Sylvain Ouellet; 4,998 (59.21%)		Sylvain Ouellet	PM hold
Parc-Extension	20,775	City councillor	40.47%	Mary Deros; 4,035 (49.77%)	Rafik Bentabbel; 3,567 (43.99%)	Mohammad Tanbir Yousuf (CM); 506 (6.24%)	Mary Deros	EDC hold
Saint-Michel	21,856	City councillor	30.48%	Frantz Benjamin; 3,882 (61.95%)	Rana Alrabi; 2,384 (38.05%)		Frantz Benjamin	EDC hold
Villeray	24,385	City councillor	53.64%	Elsie Lefebvre; 6,190 (48.18%)	Rosannie Filato; 6,499 (50.59%)	Charles Sounan (Ind.); 158 (1.23%)	Elsie Lefebvre	PM gain from EDC

== By-elections ==
=== Mayor of Rivière-des-Prairies–Pointe-aux-Trembles ===
By-elections were held on December 16, 2018:

Party	Candidate	Vote	%
Projet Montréal	Caroline Bourgeois	5,314	47.99
Ensemble Montréal	Manuel Guedes	4,951	44.71
Independent	Marius Minier	662	5.98
Total valid votes		10,927	13.71

=== Councillor, Saint-Michel District ===
By-elections were held on December 16, 2018:

Party	Candidate	Vote	%
Ensemble Montréal	Josué Corvil	943	39.71
Projet Montréal	Nadine Raymond	772	32.51
Independent	Reginald Pierre	616	25.94
Total valid votes		2,331	10.92

=== Mayor of Le Plateau-Mont-Royal ===
A by-election was held on October 6, 2019:

Party	Candidate	Vote	%
Projet Montréal	Luc Rabouin	10,631	67.04
Ensemble Montréal	Jean-Pierre Szaraz	2,747	17.32
Vrai changement	Marc-Antoine Desjardins	2,480	15.64
Total valid votes		15,858	24.55

=== Councillor, Saint-Léonard-Est District: Cancelled ===
A by-election was to do be held on March 15, 2020. However, it was delayed the day before the election due to the onset of the COVID-19 pandemic in Quebec then cancelled altogether later that year.

Party	Candidate	Vote	%
Ensemble Montréal	Angela Gentile	Cancelled	–
Projet Montréal	Arij-Abrar El Korbi	Cancelled	–
