= Équipe Andrée Champoux pour Verdun =

Équipe Andrée Champoux pour Verdun (EAC) (English: Team Andrée Champoux for Verdun) was a municipal political party in Montreal, Quebec, Canada. The party contested seats on the Verdun borough council in the 2013 Montreal municipal election.

== Party leader ==
As its name implies, EAC was led by Andrée Champoux, who was also its candidate for borough mayor in 2013. Champoux had previously been elected as a borough councillor for Champlain–L'Île-des-Sœurs in the 2009 Montreal municipal election as a candidate of Union Montreal. She left the party on December 4, 2012, after its leader, Gérald Tremblay, resigned from office amid scandal.

When Verdun borough mayor Claude Trudel also resigned from office in the same period, Champoux put forward her name to become his interim successor. She was defeated by city councillor Ginette Marotte in a four-to-two vote among the remaining borough council members.

== 2013 election ==
After serving for several months as an independent, Champoux formed EAC in 2013. The party's campaign slogan in that year's municipal election was «citoyens d'abord» (English: "citizens first"). During the campaign, Champoux outlined her party's approaches to subjects such as public transit on Nuns' Island and poverty reduction.

She was defeated in the mayoral contest, and none of the EAC's candidates for city council and borough council were elected.

The party was dissolved and ceased to be recognized by the Directeur général des élections du Québec on July 17, 2014.

=== Election results ===
Electoral District	Eligible voters	Position	Turnout	Candidates						Incumbent	Result
Electoral District	Eligible voters	Position	Turnout	Équipe Coderre	Coalition	Projet Montréal	OVM	VCM	Other	Incumbent	Result
—	47,677	Borough mayor	44.74%	Jean-François Parenteau; 5,147 (24.81%)	Alain Tassé; 2,902 (13.99%)	Mary Ann Davis; 4,594 (22.14%)	André Savard; 2,669 (12.86%)	Mourad Bendjennet; 3,645 (17.57%)	Andrée Champoux (EAC); 1,549 (7.47%) Jency Mercier (IM); 139 (0.67%) Katherine Le Rougetel (Ind.); 102 (0.49%)	Ginette Marotte	EDC gain from Ind.
Champlain –L'Île-des-Sœurs	25,660	City councillor	45.60%	Manon Gauthier; 2,972 (26.25%)	André Julien; 1,612 (14.24%)	Jack L. Kugelmass; 2,195 (19.39%)	Marc Touchette; 833 (7.36%)	Mathieu Bélanger; 2,643 (23.34%)	Jacques Gendron (EAC); 1,067 (9.42%)	Vacant	EDC gain
Champlain –L'Île-des-Sœurs	25,660	Borough councillor I	45.64%	Pierre L'Heureux; 3,051 (26.9%)	Paul Beaupré; 1,782 (15.71%)	Dolores Durbau; 2,149 (18.95%)	Charles Côté; 984 (8.68%)	Jacline Leroux; 2,514 (22.17%)	Carole Anctil (EAC); 752 (6.63%); Abdulilah Kassem (Ind.); 109 (0.96%)	Paul Beaupré	EDC gain from CM
Champlain –L'Île-des-Sœurs	25,660	Borough councillor II	45.68%	Marie-Eve Brunet; 3,051 (26.88%)	Jean-Pierre Boivin; 1,886 (16.62%)	Stefana Lamasanu; 2,313 (20.36%)	Luce Latendresse; 800 (7.05%)	Stéphanie Raymond-Bougie; 2,617 (23.06%)	Béatrice Guay Pepper (EAC); 684 (6.03%)	Andrée Champoux	EDC gain from EAC
Desmarchais-Crawford	22,017	City councillor	43.68%	Sébastien Dhavernas; 2,095 (22.53%)	Françoise Gloutnay; 1,082 (11.64%)	Sterling Downey; 2,306 (24.80%)	Richard Langlais; 1,523 (16.38%)	Marie-Josée Parent; 1,917 (20.62%)	France Caya (EAC); 376 (4.04%)	Alain Tassé	PM gain from CM
Desmarchais-Crawford	22,017	Borough councillor I	43.67%	Michelle Tremblay; 2,141 (23.05%)	Monique Trudel; 1,228 (13.22%)	Luc Gagnon; 2,329 (25.07%)	Joanne Poulin; 1,431 (15.41%)	Gladys Negret; 1,773 (19.09%)	Michèle L'Allier-Davies (EAC); 387 (4.17%)	Ann Guy	PM gain from Ind.
Desmarchais-Crawford	22,017	Borough councillor II	43.67%	Philippe Sarrasin; 2,018 (21.71%)	Rielle Lévesque; 1,060 (11.40%)	Marie-Andrée Mauger; 2,422 (26.05%)	Robert Auger; 1,510 (16.24%)	André-Yanne Parent; 1,878 (20.20%)	Mamad Raheemeea (EAC); 409 (4.40%)	André Savard	PM gain from OVM
