= Alain Tassé =

Canadian politician

Member of the Montreal Executive Committee responsible for economic development and urban planning [and for water as of June 23, 2013]
- In office 2012–2013
- Preceded by: Richard Deschamps (Economic Development, Infrastructure, and Major Projects (Montreal 2025))
- Succeeded by: Denis Coderre (Mayor, Economic Development, International Relations, Mont Royal, Montreal’s 375th anniversary); Russell Copeman (Housing and Urban Planning); Chantal Rouleau (Water and Water Infrastructure)

Montreal City Councillor for Desmarchais-Crawford
- In office 2005–2013
- Preceded by: position created
- Succeeded by: Sterling Downey

Verdun City Councillor, Division 5
- In office 1993–1997
- Preceded by: Jocelyn Beauvais
- Succeeded by: eliminated by redistribution

President of the New Democratic Party of Canada in Quebec
- In office 1990–1991
- Preceded by: Paul Cappon
- Succeeded by: Réjean Bercier

Personal details
- Party: New Democratic Party; Anti-Annexation Party (Verdun) (1985); Municipal Action Party (Verdun) (1993–97); Montreal Island Citizens Union (MICU), renamed as Union Montreal (UM) (2005–12); Independent (2012–13); Coalition Montréal (2013)

Alain Tassé is a politician in Montreal, Quebec, Canada. He served on the Montreal city council from 2005 to 2013, initially as a member of the Montreal Island Citizens Union (MICU)/Union Montreal (UM) party and later as an independent. From 2012 to 2013, he was a member of the Montreal executive committee (i.e., the municipal cabinet). At an earlier time in his life, he held a leading position in the New Democratic Party in Quebec and was a candidate for the House of Commons of Canada.

== Private career ==
Tassé's 2013 campaign literature identified him as the owner of a property management firm specializing in the oversight of non-profit housing.

== New Democratic Party activist ==
Tassé was a candidate for the Canadian House of Commons in the 1988 Canadian federal election, running for the New Democratic Party in Verdun—Saint-Paul. He finished third against Progressive Conservative Gilbert Chartrand.

The New Democratic Party experienced serious internal divisions in 1989 over the nature and extent of its support for the proposed Meech Lake Accord on constitutional reform. In December 1989, delegates at the party's convention voted to seek improvements to the accord via a series of amendments. This decision was opposed by many Quebec delegates, particularly those who identified as Quebec nationalists and who opposed any changes to the original text. Tassé was among those opposing the decision; he was quoted as saying, "I'm a socialist before I'm a nationalist, but I remain a (Quebec) nationalist."

Tassé was chosen as interim president of the federal wing of the New Democratic Party in Quebec in June 1990. He stood down from the position in early 1991 and became special assistant on Quebec issues to federal party leader Audrey McLaughlin, a position he continued to hold through to the 1993 Canadian federal election. In June 1991, he was involved in developing a compromise resolution on constitutional reform intended to win support for the party in both Quebec and Western Canada.

== Municipal politician ==
Tassé unsuccessfully sought election to the Verdun city council in 1985, running as a candidate of the Parti contre l'annexion de Verdun (Verdun Anti-Annexation Party), which opposed a proposed merger of Verdun with Montreal. He was elected in the 1993 municipal election as a member of Georges Bossé's Parti d'action municipale (Municipal Action Party) and served for the next four years. He sought re-election in 1997 but was defeated.

Verdun was subsequently annexed to Montreal on January 1, 2002, and Tassé was elected to the Montreal city council in 2005, winning in the Desmarchais-Crawford division in that year's municipal election. The Montreal Island Citizens Union won a majority on council, and Tassé served as a backbench supporter of Gérald Tremblay administration. He was re-elected in the 2009 election, which was won by Tremblay's renamed Union Montreal party. Following this election, Tassé served on the city's task force dealing with bedbug infestations and oversaw the establishment of an open-data portal for municipal information.

The Union Montreal party fell into crisis in late 2012, after serious allegations of corruption were made about the party at the Charbonneau Commission. Tassé was one of the first councillors to resign from the party following these revelations, serving as an independent on council as of November 2012. Following Tremblay's resignation as mayor, city council voted to choose a replacement, and Tassé supported Michael Applebaum's successful bid for the position. On November 22, 2012, Applebaum named Tassé to his executive committee with responsibility for economic development and urbanization. He retained these responsibilities when Laurent Blanchard succeeded Applebaum as mayor on June 25, 2013, and also gained responsibility for the oversight of water.

In January 2013, Tassé announced the beginning of a long-term renewal plan for a derelict area in the northern section of Montreal's Parc Avenue. He indicated that the plan was to turn a former "no man's land" area into a mixed-use neighbourhood, with some continued industrial and commercial presence. He also defended the city's decision to authorize condominium towers in Griffintown without public consultation, saying that the buildings would be an improvement over what had been there previously.

Tassé speculated that he might contest the 2013 municipal election as part of a group of independents in Verdun, but he ultimately supported Marcel Côté's bid for mayor and joined the Coalition Montréal party. Under this party's banner, he ran for borough mayor of Verdun and finished fourth against Jean-François Parenteau of Équipe Denis Coderre pour Montréal. Tassé's term on the executive committee ended when Blanchard's administration stood down from office.

== Electoral record ==
Municipal (Montreal)

2013 Montreal municipal election: Borough Mayor, Verdun
Party	Candidate	Votes	%	±%
Équipe Denis Coderre	Jean-François Parenteau	5,147	24.81	
Projet Montréal	Mary Ann Davis	4,594	22.14	-0.08
Vrai changement	Mourad Bendjennet	3,645	17.57	
Coalition Montréal	Alain Tassé (incumbent city councillor)	2,902	13.99	
Option Verdun / Montréal	André Savard (borough councillor)	2,669	12.86	
Équipe Andrée Champoux	Andrée Champoux (borough councillor)	1,549	7.47	
Intégrité Montréal	Jency Mercier	139	0.67	
Independent	Katherine Le Rougetel	102	0.49	
Total valid votes		20,747	100	–
Total rejected ballots		583	2.73	–
Turnout		21,330	44.74	+6.40
Electors on the lists		47,677	–	–
Source: Election results, 2013, City of Montreal. Le Rougetel was a candidate of the unregistered Communist League. Source:

2009 Montreal municipal election: Councillor, Desmarchais-Crawford
Party	Candidate	Votes	%	±%
Union Montreal	Alain Tassé (incumbent)	3,115	38.69	-17.49
Vision Montreal	Antoine Richard	2,429	30.17	-2.73
Projet Montréal	Mathieu Boisvert	1,901	23.61	+12.68
Montréal Ville-Marie	Jeannette Lafrance	606	7.53	
Total valid votes		8,051	100	–
Total rejected ballots		283	5.33	–
Turnout		8,334	37.00	–
Electors on the lists		22,523	–	–
Source: Election results, 2009, City of Montreal.

2005 Montreal municipal election: Councillor, Desmarchais-Crawford
Party	Candidate	Votes	%	±%
Citizens Union	Alain Tassé	4,066	56.18	
Vision Montreal	Alain Fortier	2,381	32.90	
Projet Montréal	Mathieu Fontaine	791	10.93	
Total valid votes		7,238	100	–
Source: Election results, 2005, City of Montreal.

Municipal (Verdun)

1997 Verdun municipal election: Councillor, Division 3
Party	Candidate	Votes	%	±%
Independent	Ernie Chiasson	730	52.67	
Parti d'action municipale	Alain Tassé (incumbent)	656	47.33	
Total valid votes		1,386	100	–
Source: "Results from races for mayor, council" Montreal Gazette, 3 November 1997, A6.

1993 Verdun municipal election: Councillor, Division 5
Party	Candidate	Votes	%	±%
Parti d'action municipale	Alain Tassé	863	50.59	
Regroupement des Citoyens de Verdun	Jocelyn Beauvais (incumbent)	608	35.64	
Independent	Jean-Louis Ladouceur	235	13.77	
Total valid votes		1,706	100	–
Source: "Incumbents all re-elected in Montreal East voting," Montreal Gazette, 9 November 1993, A6.

1985 Verdun municipal election: Councillor, Division 4
Party	Candidate	Votes	%	±%
Parti d'action municipale	Jocelyn Beauvais	745	36.27	
Parti de l'Unité de Verdun	Nicole Brault-Greco	437	21.28	
Regroupement des Citoyens de Verdun	Paul Beaupré	430	20.93	
Parti contre l'annexion de Verdun	Alain Tassé	411	20.11	
Parti civique de Verdun	Gilbert Léger	31	1.51	
Total valid votes		2,054	100	–
Source: "Final results for Verdun, Hudson, Montreal East," Montreal Gazette, 5 November 1985, A6.

Federal

1988 Canadian federal election: Verdun—Saint-Paul
Party	Candidate	Votes	%	±%
Progressive Conservative	Gilbert Chartrand (incumbent)	20,113	45.32	
Liberal	Raymond Lavigne	15,207	34.27	
New Democratic	Alain Tassé	6,572	14.81	
Green	Jan-Marc Lavergne	1,339	3.02	
Rhinoceros	Irène Maman Mayer	902	2.03	
Commonwealth of Canada	Claude Brosseau	142	0.32	
No Affiliation	Yvon Turgeon	105	0.24	
Total valid votes		44,380	100.00	–
Total rejected ballots		1,108	–	–
Turnout		45,488	73.22	–
Electors on the lists		62,126	–	–
Source: Report of the Chief Electoral Officer, Thirty-fourth General Election, 1988. Yvon Turgeon was a member of the Communist Party of Canada (Marxist-Leninist). Source:
