= Option Verdun/Montréal =

Option Verdun/Montréal (OVM) was a municipal political party in Montreal, Quebec, Canada. The party contested seats on the Verdun borough council in the 2013 Montreal municipal election.

== Party leader ==
OVM is led by André Savard, who was also its candidate for borough mayor in 2013. Savard had previously been elected as a borough councillor for Desmarchais-Crawford in the 2005 Montreal municipal election as a candidate of the Montreal Island Citizens Union (MICU) and was returned in the 2009 Montreal municipal election for the renamed Union Montreal. During his second term, he served as chair of the borough's public works, traffic, and public safety and security committee. Savard left Union Montreal in late November 2012 after allegations of illegal fundraising were made before the Charbonneau Commission.

== 2013 election ==
After serving for serving months as an independent, Savard formed OVM in 2013. During that year's municipal campaign, he outlined his party's approaches on matters such as poverty reduction and social housing.

Savard was defeated in the mayoral contest, and none of the OVM's candidates for city council and borough council were elected.

The party was dissolved and ceased to be recognized by the Directeur général des élections du Québec on June 1, 2015.

=== Election results ===
Electoral District	Eligible voters	Position	Turnout	Candidates						Incumbent	Result
Electoral District	Eligible voters	Position	Turnout	Équipe Coderre	Coalition	Projet Montréal	OVM	VCM	Other	Incumbent	Result
—	47,677	Borough mayor	44.74%	Jean-François Parenteau; 5,147 (24.81%)	Alain Tassé; 2,902 (13.99%)	Mary Ann Davis; 4,594 (22.14%)	André Savard; 2,669 (12.86%)	Mourad Bendjennet; 3,645 (17.57%)	Andrée Champoux (EAC); 1,549 (7.47%) Jency Mercier (IM); 139 (0.67%) Katherine Le Rougetel (Ind.); 102 (0.49%)	Ginette Marotte	EDC gain from Ind.
Champlain –L'Île-des-Sœurs	25,660	City councillor	45.60%	Manon Gauthier; 2,972 (26.25%)	André Julien; 1,612 (14.24%)	Jack L. Kugelmass; 2,195 (19.39%)	Marc Touchette; 833 (7.36%)	Mathieu Bélanger; 2,643 (23.34%)	Jacques Gendron (EAC); 1,067 (9.42%)	Vacant	EDC gain
Champlain –L'Île-des-Sœurs	25,660	Borough councillor I	45.64%	Pierre L'Heureux; 3,051 (26.9%)	Paul Beaupré; 1,782 (15.71%)	Dolores Durbau; 2,149 (18.95%)	Charles Côté; 984 (8.68%)	Jacline Leroux; 2,514 (22.17%)	Carole Anctil (EAC); 752 (6.63%); Abdulilah Kassem (Ind.); 109 (0.96%)	Paul Beaupré	EDC gain from CM
Champlain –L'Île-des-Sœurs	25,660	Borough councillor II	45.68%	Marie-Eve Brunet; 3,051 (26.88%)	Jean-Pierre Boivin; 1,886 (16.62%)	Stefana Lamasanu; 2,313 (20.36%)	Luce Latendresse; 800 (7.05%)	Stéphanie Raymond-Bougie; 2,617 (23.06%)	Béatrice Guay Pepper (EAC); 684 (6.03%)	Andrée Champoux	EDC gain from EAC
Desmarchais-Crawford	22,017	City councillor	43.68%	Sébastien Dhavernas; 2,095 (22.53%)	Françoise Gloutnay; 1,082 (11.64%)	Sterling Downey; 2,306 (24.80%)	Richard Langlais; 1,523 (16.38%)	Marie-Josée Parent; 1,917 (20.62%)	France Caya (EAC); 376 (4.04%)	Alain Tassé	PM gain from CM
Desmarchais-Crawford	22,017	Borough councillor I	43.67%	Michelle Tremblay; 2,141 (23.05%)	Monique Trudel; 1,228 (13.22%)	Luc Gagnon; 2,329 (25.07%)	Joanne Poulin; 1,431 (15.41%)	Gladys Negret; 1,773 (19.09%)	Michèle L'Allier-Davies (EAC); 387 (4.17%)	Ann Guy	PM gain from Ind.
Desmarchais-Crawford	22,017	Borough councillor II	43.67%	Philippe Sarrasin; 2,018 (21.71%)	Rielle Lévesque; 1,060 (11.40%)	Marie-Andrée Mauger; 2,422 (26.05%)	Robert Auger; 1,510 (16.24%)	André-Yanne Parent; 1,878 (20.20%)	Mamad Raheemeea (EAC); 409 (4.40%)	André Savard	PM gain from OVM
