= Jean-François Parenteau =

Canadian politician

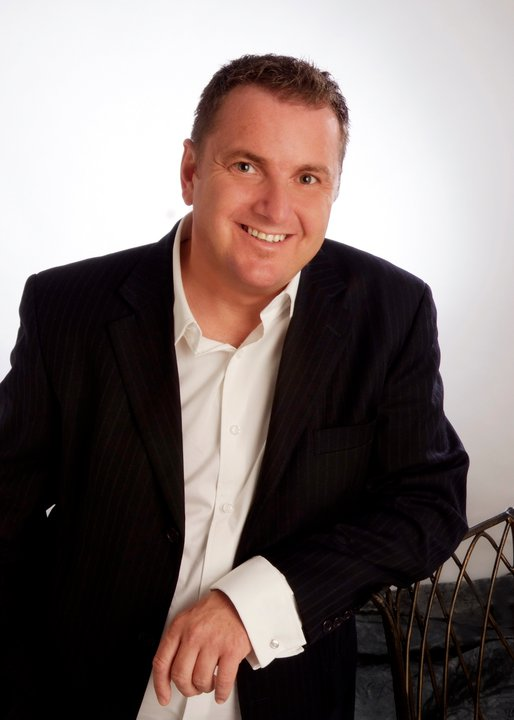
- Portrait of Jean-François Parenteau

Member of the Montreal Executive Committee with responsibility for citizen services and purchasing
- Incumbent
- Assumed office 2017

Associate member of the Montreal Executive Committee with responsibility for water
- In office 2013–2017
- Preceded by: position created
- Succeeded by: position abolished

Borough Mayor of Verdun and Montreal City Councillor
- In office 2013–2021
- Preceded by: Ginette Marotte
- Succeeded by: Marie-Andrée Mauger

Personal details
- Party: Independent

Jean-François Parenteau is a politician in Montreal, Quebec, Canada. He was elected as borough mayor of Verdun in 2013 and, by virtue of holding this position, is a member of both the Montreal city council and the Verdun borough council. He currently sits as an independent and is a member of the Montreal Executive Committee.

== Private life and early political career ==
Parenteau sought election as a borough councillor in Verdun's Desmarchais-Crawford division in the 2009 Montreal municipal election as a candidate of Vision Montreal. He was narrowly defeated by Ann Guy of the governing Union Montreal party. When he sought election as borough mayor in 2013, media reports described Parenteau as forty-two years old and the owner of an orthopedics supply store in Verdun.

== Borough mayor and Montreal city councillor ==
Parenteau was narrowly elected as borough mayor of Verdun in the 2013 municipal election. The following March, after an internal investigation into the awarding of construction permits in the borough, he announced the dismissal of Verdun's chief public works director Pierre Boutin. Although Boutin was cleared by the investigation, Parenteau justified the dismissal on the grounds that "the link of trust between a mayor and his borough director is essential to work on any serious administrative reform." Parenteau subsequently said that preferential treatment and insider connections between developers and civil servants had cost taxpayers at least $1.5 million in lost profits.

Parenteau arranged to remove about 1,500 tons of soil from an abandoned snow dump near the St. Lawrence River in April 2014, six months after it had been deposited and shortly after it was discovered to have been contaminated with creosote. Later in the same year, he advocated for the creation of a new beach in the same area (in conjunction with the cleanup effort), over suggestions from the opposition Project Montreal party and others that the beach should be established near the Verdun Auditorium, closer to a Montreal Metro station. Parenteau eventually reversed his position in the face of public opposition and gave approval for the beach to be constructed near the auditorium.

In early 2016, the Verdun borough announced that it would no longer lease a space for Réseau d'Entraide de Verdun (REV), a food bank in the community. A representative of REV indicated that the borough had refused to meet with them to work out differences; Parenteau responded that this was not an accurate statement, and that the borough had made efforts to "mend fences" but ultimately ended the lease due to continued acrimony.

Parenteau served as an associate member of the Montreal executive committee (i.e., the municipal cabinet) with responsibility for water, working in conjunction with Chantal Rouleau, the executive committee member responsible for this file.

Parenteau was chosen as the third most popular politician in a 2016 YULorama poll of Montreal residents, behind Denis Coderre and Justin Trudeau.

Parenteau was reelected in the 2017 municipal election as part of Équipe Denis Coderre. However, shortly after the election, he left the party to sit as an independent upon being named to the Montreal Executive Committee by Mayor Valérie Plante. He was named executive committee member in charge of citizen services and purchasing.

== Electoral record ==
2017 Montreal municipal election: Borough Mayor, Verdun
| Party | Candidate | Votes | % | ±% |
|---|---|---|---|---|
| Équipe Denis Coderre | Jean-François Parenteau (incumbent) | 11,925 | 54.19 | +29.38 |
| Projet Montréal | Michèle Chappaz | 10,082 | 45.81 | +23.67 |
| Total valid votes | | 22,007 | 100 | – |
| Total rejected ballots | | 428 | 1.91 | – |
| Turnout | | 22,435 | 45.30 | +0.56 |
| Electors on the lists | | 49,529 | – | – |
Source: Election results, 2017, City of Montreal.

2013 Montreal municipal election: Borough Mayor, Verdun
| Party | Candidate | Votes | % | ±% |
|---|---|---|---|---|
| Équipe Denis Coderre | Jean-François Parenteau | 5,147 | 24.81 | |
| Projet Montréal | Mary Ann Davis | 4,594 | 22.14 | -0.08 |
| Vrai changement | Mourad Bendjennet | 3,645 | 17.57 | |
| Coalition Montréal | Alain Tassé (incumbent city councillor) | 2,902 | 13.99 | |
| Option Verdun / Montréal | André Savard (borough councillor) | 2,669 | 12.86 | |
| Équipe Andrée Champoux | Andrée Champoux (borough councillor) | 1,549 | 7.47 | |
| Intégrité Montréal | Jency Mercier | 139 | 0.67 | |
| Independent | Katherine Le Rougetel | 102 | 0.49 | |
| Total valid votes | | 20,747 | 100 | – |
| Total rejected ballots | | 583 | 2.73 | – |
| Turnout | | 21,330 | 44.74 | +6.40 |
| Electors on the lists | | 47,677 | – | – |
Source: Election results, 2013, City of Montreal. Le Rougetel was a candidate of the unregistered Communist League. Source:

2009 Montreal municipal election: Borough councillor I, Desmarchais-Crawford
| Party | Candidate | Votes | % | ±% |
|---|---|---|---|---|
| Union Montreal | Ann Guy | 2,922 | 36.33 | -25.06 |
| Vision Montreal | Jean-François Parenteau | 2,784 | 34.61 | -4.00 |
| Projet Montréal | Xavier Mondor | 1,837 | 22.84 | |
| Montréal Ville-Marie | Diane Schinck | 501 | 6.23 | |
| Total valid votes | | 8,044 | 100 | – |
| Total rejected ballots | | 307 | 5.33 | – |
| Turnout | | 8,351 | 37.08 | – |
| Electors on the lists | | 22,523 | – | – |
Source: Election results, 2009, City of Montreal.
