= Dhavernas =

Dhavernas is a surname. Notable people with the surname include:

- Caroline Dhavernas (born 1978), Canadian actress, daughter of Sébastien
- Sébastien Dhavernas (born 1950), Canadian actor
