= Éric Alan Caldwell =

Canadian politician

Member of the Montreal Executive Committee with responsibility for urban planning, transit, and Montreal's office of public consultation
- In office 2017–2025
- Preceded by: Russell Copeman (urban planning and public consultation), Aref Salem (transit)

Montreal City Councillor for Hochelaga
- In office 2013–2025
- Preceded by: vacant, previously Laurent Blanchard
- Succeeded by: Sarah V. Doyon

Personal details
- Party: Projet Montréal

Éric Alan Caldwell is a politician in Montreal, Quebec, Canada. He served on the Montreal city council from 2013 to 2025, representing the Hochelaga division as a member of Projet Montréal. In November 2017, he was appointed to the Montreal executive committee (i.e., the municipal cabinet) by new mayor Valérie Plante.

By virtue of holding his position on city council, Caldwell also served on the Mercier–Hochelaga-Maisonneuve borough council.

== Early life and private career ==
Caldwell was raised in Sainte-Edwidge-de-Clifton, a small community in Quebec's Estrie region. When he was first inaugurated as a Montreal city councillor in 2013, he was quoted as saying, "I grew up in a village where there was a strong tradition of democracy, so for me this is a very solemn ceremony." He moved to Montreal in 2001 and has certificates in cinematography and economics from the Université du Québec à Montréal (UQAM).

== Political career ==
Caldwell first sought election to city council in the 2005 municipal election, when he ran for borough mayor of Mercier–Hochelaga-Maisonneuve and placed third against Vision Montreal candidate Lyn Thériault Faust. He later ran for the Hochelaga city council seat in the 2009 election and finished second against Vision candidate Laurent Blanchard. Over the next four years, he attended borough council meetings on a regular basis and, as a citizen, proposed a number of policy initiatives.

=== Montreal city councillor ===
Caldwell was elected to council on his third attempt, defeating Blanchard (who was by this time serving as Montreal's interim mayor) for the Hochelaga seat in the 2013 election. Project Montréal became the official opposition on city council after the election, and Caldwell was chosen in early 2014 as his party's critic for citizen services and Space for Life. He was also appointed to Montreal's Commission sur le schéma d'aménagement et de développement de Montréal (Commission on the Land Use and Development Plan) in the same year.

In June 2015, Caldwell was appointed as a Project Montréal representative on the Commission sur le développement économique et urbain et l'habitation (Commission on Economic and Urban Development and Housing). He initially received this position on an interim basis, filling in for Peter McQueen, who was then seeking election to the House of Commons of Canada. Ultimately, however, he served on the committee until the 2017 election.

During his first term on council, Caldwell fought for the Montreal Botanical Gardens to revert to its previous policy of allowing free access outside of operating hours, promoted self-service carsharing in Mercier–Hochelaga-Maisonneuve, took part in the preparation of the borough's éco-quartier environmental plan, and sought to protect natural areas in Pierrefonds-Ouest against a proposed housing development scheme. In July 2016, Caldwell and borough mayor Réal Ménard (who were not generally political allies) announced the creation of a new public space in the borough called Le patio culturel.

Caldwell was elected to a second term on council in the 2017 municipal election, which was won by Projet Montréal. Following the election, new mayor Valérie Plante appointed Caldwell to her executive committee with responsibility for urban planning, transit, and Montreal's office of public consultation.

== Electoral record ==
2017 Montreal municipal election: Councillor, Hochelaga
Party	Candidate	Votes	%	±%
Projet Montréal	Éric Alan Caldwell (incumbent)	7,326	71.49	+36.31
Équipe Denis Coderre	Jean-François Beaupre	2,922	28.51	+15.67
Total valid votes		10,248	100	
Total rejected ballots		266		
Turnout		10,514	43.06	
Electors on the lists		24,419		
Source: Election results, 2017, City of Montreal.

2013 Montreal municipal election: Councillor, Hochelaga
Party	Candidate	Votes	%	±%
Projet Montréal	Éric Alan Caldwell	3,408	35.18	+5.61
Coalition Montréal	Laurent Blanchard (incumbent mayor)	2,739	28.28	−29.08
Vrai changement	Mikael St-Pierre	2,013	20.78	
Équipe Denis Coderre	Patrick Charbonneau	1,244	12.84	
Independent	Nicole Donnelly	282	2.91	
Total valid votes		9,686	97.06	
Total rejected ballots		293	2.94	
Turnout		9,979	42.01	+4.44
Electors on the lists		23,755		
Source: Election results, 2013, City of Montreal.

2009 Montreal municipal election: Councillor, Hochelaga
Party	Candidate	Votes	%	±%
Vision Montreal	Laurent Blanchard (incumbent)	4,965	57.36	+10.90
Projet Montréal	Éric Alan Caldwell	2,560	29.57	+12.03
Union Montreal	Louis Cléroux	1,131	13.07	−22.94
Total valid votes		8,656	96.73	
Total rejected ballots		293	3.27	
Turnout		8,949	37.57	
Electors on the lists		23,817		
Source: Election results, 2009, City of Montreal.

2005 Montreal municipal election: Borough mayor, Mercier–Hochelaga-Maisonneuve
Party	Candidate	Votes	%	±%
Vision Montreal	Lyn Thériault Faust (incumbent councillor)	15,130	48.07	
Citizens Union	Pierre Bélanger	13,079	41.56	
Projet Montréal	Éric Alan Caldwell	3,263	10.37	
Total valid votes		31,472	100	
Source: City of Montreal official results (in French), City of Montreal.
