= Lionel Perez =

Lionel Perez may refer to:

- Lionel Perez (footballer) (born 1967), French footballer
- Lionel Perez (politician) (born 1970), Canadian lawyer and entrepreneur
