= Michèle Deslauriers =

Canadian actress (born 1946)

- Born: January 17, 1946 (age 80); Quebec, Canada
- Occupation: Actress
- Years active: 1971–present
- Spouse: Sébastien Dhavernas
- Children: Caroline Dhavernas; Gabrielle Dhavernas

Michèle Deslauriers (born January 17, 1946) is a Canadian actress.

She is the wife of actor Sébastien Dhavernas and the mother of actress Caroline Dhavernas and voice actress Gabrielle Dhavernas. She provides the voice announcing stops, service interruptions, and special messages for the Montreal Metro.

== Filmography ==
- Nic et Pic (1971)
- Y'a pas de problème (unknown episodes, 1975) .... Mme Martel
- Passe-Partout (7 episodes, "L'éléphant", "L'été s'en vient", "Bon coup, mauvais coup", "Le sable c'est fait pour...", "Le chocolat", "On joue à la cachette" and "L'épicerie", 1977–1979) .... Bijou / Zig Zag / Ti-Brin 3x / Ti-Brin and Zig Zag / Ti-Brin (voice)
- Chocolate Eclair (Éclair au chocolat) (1979) ....
- Pop Citrouille (unknown episodes, 1979) .... Various
- Bye Bye (5 episodes, "Bye-Bye 1980", "Bonne année Roger", "Bye-Bye 1982", "Bye-Bye 1986" and "Bye-Bye 1987", 1980–1987) .... Various
- Le 101, ouest, avenue des Pins (unknown episodes, 1984) .... Marie-Pierre
- L'Amour avec un Grand A (1 episode, "Marie, Martine et Martin", 1986) .... Yvette
- Chambres en ville (unknown episodes, 1989) .... Sage-femme
- Marilyn (unknown episodes, 1991) ....
- Denise... aujourd'hui (unknown episodes, 1991) .... Carmen
- La princesse astronaute (unknown episodes, 1993) .... Actrice tragédienne
- Cap Tourmente (1993) .... Madame Huot
- Les intrépides (unknown episodes, 1993) .... Voleuse de violons
- René Lévesque (unknown episodes, 1994) .... Judith Jasmin
- Lapoisse et Jobard (unknown episodes, 1997) .... Détective
- La petite vie (2 episodes, "Mlle Morin" and "Le divorce II", 1998) .... Directrice du salon funéraire and Gérarde
- XChange (2000) .... Mrs. Scott
- Le Monde de Charlotte (unknown episodes, 2000) .... Rachel Boulanger
- La promesse (unknown episodes, 2005) .... Corinne Giasson Marion
- Et Dieu créa Laflaque (1 episode, "Y'a t'il un pépére dans l'avion", 2006) .... Georgette (voice)
- Le Cœur a ses raisons (19 episodes, 2005–2007) .... Madge
- Mars et Avril .... Voix de la STM (voice)
- Les Beaux Malaises .... Monique, mère de Martin
- All Stirred Up! (Tous toqués!) - 2024 .... Mayor
- Cardboard City (Ville Jacques-Carton) - 2025
