= Manon Gauthier =

Canadian politician

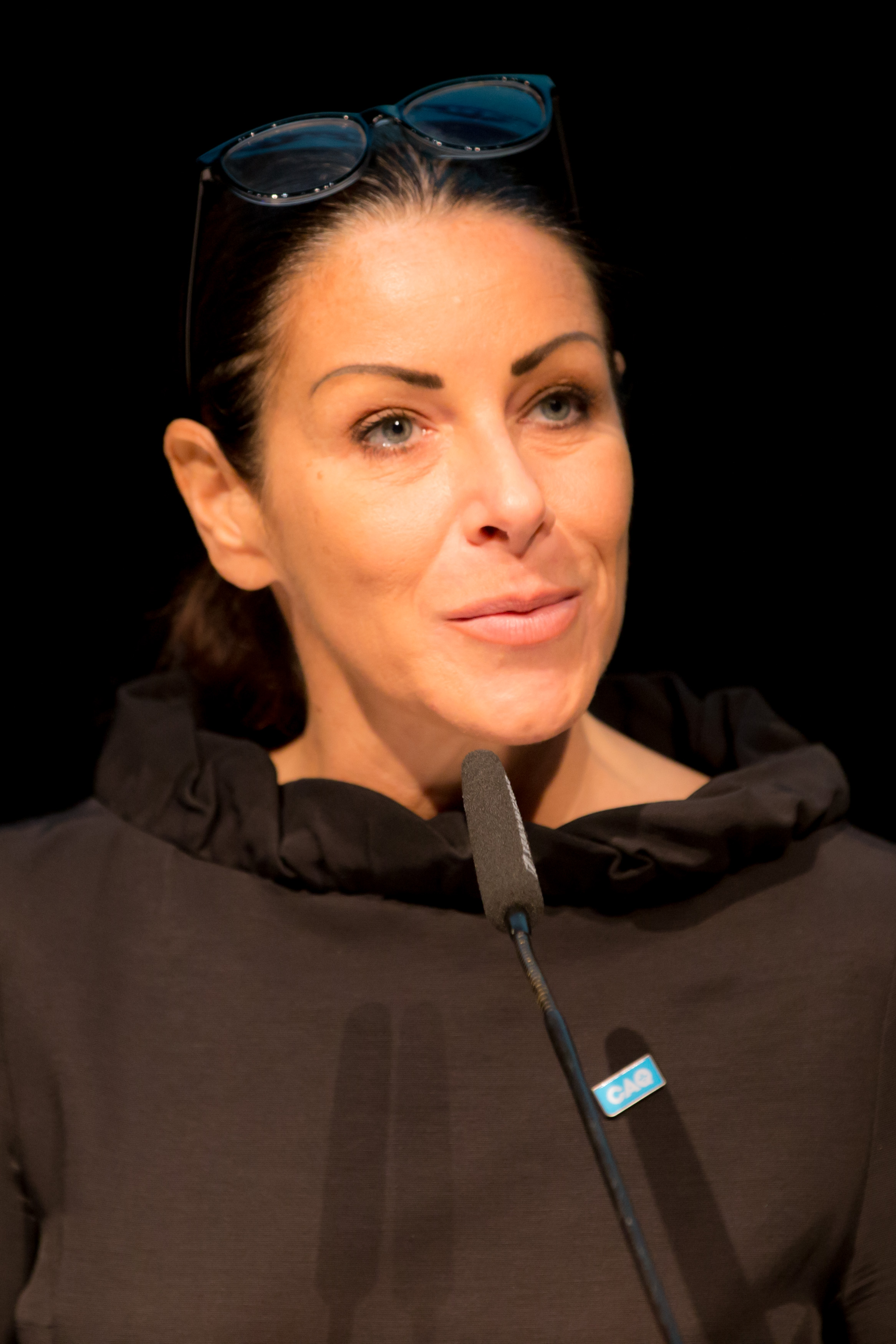
- Manon Gauthier in 2018

Member of the Montreal Executive Committee responsible for culture, heritage, and design
- In office 2013–2017
- Preceded by: Élaine Ayotte
- Succeeded by: Christine Gosselin

Member of the Montreal Executive Committee responsible for the Space for Life
- In office 2013–2017
- Preceded by: Michel Bissonnet
- Succeeded by: Laurence Lavigne Lalonde

Member of the Montreal Executive Committee responsible for the status of women
- In office 2013–2017
- Preceded by: Émilie Thuillier

Montreal City Councillor for Champlain–L'Île-des-Sœurs
- In office 2013–2017
- Preceded by: Vacant (previously Ginette Marotte)
- Succeeded by: Marie-Josée Parent

Personal details
- Party: Équipe Denis Coderre; Coalition Avenir Québec

Manon Gauthier is a politician and administrator in Montreal, Quebec, Canada. She served on the Montreal city council since November 2013, and was a member of the Montreal executive committee (i.e., the municipal cabinet) in Denis Coderre's administration throughout this time with responsibility for culture. Gauthier was previously the chief executive officer of the Segal Centre for Performing Arts from 2009 to 2013.

Gauthier retired from city council in August 2017.

== Early life and career ==
Gauthier holds a Bachelor of Arts degree from Concordia University. She began her career in the arts and entertainment sector and later served as a vice-president of Weber Shandwick (2000–04) and as a senior vice-president of Cohn & Wolfe (2004–09).

== Segal Centre CEO ==
Gauthier was recruited to serve as chief executive officer of the Segal Centre for Performing Arts by board chairperson Alvin Segal in autumn 2009. She has said that her primary responsibility was to take an organization "firmly and proudly" rooted in Montreal's Jewish community and make it a "multidisciplinary center, multilingual and open to the world." During this time, Gauthier also served as a board member of Culture Montreal and a member of the Governor General's Performing Arts Awards gala committee.

In December 2010, Gauthier was included in the Financial Post Magazine's listing of the one hundred most influential women in Canada. She resigned her position with the Segal Centre on June 1, 2013.

== City councillor ==
Gauthier was a star candidate for Denis Coderre's party in the 2013 Montreal municipal election. During the campaign, Coderre described Gauthier as one of the "pillars" of his party and promised that she would receive the culture portfolio in his administration. Coderre was successful in the mayoral contest, and Gauthier won a narrow victory in the race for councillor in the Verdun division of Champlain–L'Île-des-Sœurs.

On November 18, 2013, Coderre appointed Gauthier to his executive committee with responsibility for culture, heritage, and design, the Space for Life, and the status of women. By virtue of her position on city council, Gauthier also serves a member of the Verdun borough council.

Gauthier announced in the summer of 2014 that Montreal would cut off its annual funding to the Montreal World Film Festival. She was quoted as saying that "various requirements were not met" following "countless discussions with the Festival's leadership." She further noted that public funds were at risk of being used to pay off the organization's debts, saying, "We are here to support creators, not creditors."

In December 2014, in her capacity as executive member responsible for Space for Life, Gauthier joined with representatives of Paris's National Museum of Natural History and Quebec City's Musée de la civilisation to sign a "Declaration on Biosphere Ethics," intended to cultivate "greater awareness and engagement on the part of their partners, employees and audiences with respect to geological, biological and cultural diversity."

In 2017, Gauthier led a three-day trade delegation to Los Angeles to promote Montreal's film industry.

She has championed an effort to name more of Montreal's streets, parks, and municipal buildings after prominent women, noting a strong gender imbalance in the existing names.

In 2018, she was a candidate for the Coalition Avenir Québec in Maurice-Richard, but lost.

== Electoral record ==
2018 Quebec general election: Maurice-Richard
Party	Candidate	Votes	%	±%
Liberal	Marie Montpetit	9,459	29.52	-9.48
Québec solidaire	Raphaël Rebelo	8,929	27.86	+14.15
Coalition Avenir Québec	Manon Gauthier	6,330	19.75	+6.02
Parti Québécois	Frédéric Lapointe	6,131	19.13	-12.47
Green	Gilles Fournelle	602	1.88	+0.58
New Democratic	Jean Rémillard	216	0.67	
Parti nul	Manon Dupuis	214	0.67	
Bloc Pot	Morgan Ali	90	0.28	
Citoyens au pouvoir	Daniel St-Hilaire	77	0.24	
Total valid votes		32,048	98.51	
Total rejected ballots		486	1.49	+0.11
Turnout		32,534	68.63	-6.38
Eligible voters		47,407		
Liberal hold		Swing		-11.82
Source(s) "Rapport des résultats officiels du scrutin". Élections Québec.

2013 Montreal municipal election: Councillor, Champlain–L'Île-des-Sœurs
Party	Candidate	Votes	%	±%
Équipe Denis Coderre	Manon Gauthier	2,972	26.25	
Vrai changement	Mathieu Bélanger	2,643	23.34	
Projet Montréal	Jack L. Kugelmass	2,195	19.39	
Coalition Montréal	André Julien	1,612	14.24	
Équipe Andrée Champoux	Jacques Gendron	1,067	9.42	
Option Verdun / Montréal	Marc Touchette	833	7.36	
Total valid votes		11,322	100	–
Total rejected ballots		379	3.24	–
Turnout		11,701	45.60	
Electors on the lists		25,660	–	–
Source: Election results, 2013, City of Montreal.
