= Manon Barbe =

Canadian politician

Borough mayor for LaSalle and Montreal City Councillor
- In office 2003–2021
- Succeeded by: Nancy Blanchet

Personal details
- Party: Union Montréal (2003-2013); Pro action LaSalle (2013-)

Manon Barbe is a city councillor from Montreal, Quebec, Canada. She has served as the borough mayor of LaSalle since 2003. She was a member of the Union Montreal municipal political party.

Barbe was first elected as a city councillor in 1995. She chairs the Regional Conference of Elected Officials (French: Conférence régionale des élus) and is also the chair of the city's standing committee on cultural development and quality of life.
