= Vianne Timmons =

Canadian university administrator

Vianne Timmons, OC (born 1958) is a Canadian academic who most recently served as president and vice-chancellor of Memorial University of Newfoundland from 2020 to 2023. She was president and vice chancellor of the University of Regina, from 2008 to 2019.

== Professional life ==
She was president and vice-chancellor of the University of Regina, a public university in Regina, Saskatchewan, Canada, from 2008 to 2019. In 2013, university faculty expressed concerns that non-academic jobs and costs had risen at the expense of academic priorities since her appointment.

Timmons is a researcher, author, and lecturer in the area of educational inclusion. Prior to her appointment at the University of Regina, Timmons served as a professor and vice-president at the University of Prince Edward Island. She was appointed as an Officer of the Order of Canada (OC) in the Government House List of 29 December 2017.

In 2018, Timmons was appointed to the independent advisory board for Senate appointments; official documents naming Timmons as a Saskatchewan representative to the board stated she was a member of the Bras d'Or Mi'kmaq First Nation.

In March 2019, she was appointed as a board member of VIA Rail Canada by Minister of Transport Marc Garneau.

Timmons became president and vice chancellor of Memorial University of Newfoundland on April 1, 2020. She was removed from that post by the university's board of regents on April 6, 2023. A public report made by the Auditor General following her leave from office noted "expenses considered to be excessive," including $1,792 paid for custom-made chocolates. At the time of her removal, she was entitled to a severance payment of at least $675,000 plus $270,000 for accumulated administrative leave.

== False claims of indigeneity ==
Timmons was a recipient of the 2019 Indspire Award, and was described as one of "Twelve Indigenous people honoured for their extraordinary work across Canada."

In 2019 Timmons told media "I wasn't raised in the Mi'kmaq culture but my great, great grandmother was a Mi'kmaq woman from Conne River.... So I am of Mi'kmaq heritage." In 2021 she told media "I'm of Mi'kmaq ancestry." A March 8, 2023 CBC investigation was published with evidence that she is not Indigenous, and that she has claimed to be Indigenous in the past. Timmons released a statement acknowledging that she is not Indigenous. On March 13, Timmons went on a 6-week paid leave while Memorial University began a consultation process with the Indigenous community to discuss the issue. Following this announcement, an Indigenous faculty member stated they had raised concerns about claims to Indigeneity and Memorial's response to identity verification the previous year.

== See also ==
- Marie-Josée Parent
