= Sterling Downey =

Canadian politician and muralist

Montreal City Councillor for Desmarchais-Crawford
- Incumbent
- Assumed office 2013
- Preceded by: Alain Tassé

Personal details
- Party: Projet Montréal

Sterling Downey is a Canadian artist, festival organizer, and politician in Montreal, Quebec. He is a founding member and principal organizer of the Under Pressure graffiti art festival in the city and has served on the Montreal city council since 2013 as a member of Projet Montréal.

== Private career: graffiti artist and festival organizer ==
Downey was born in Montreal. Both his parents died when he was in his mid-20s, a development that he has acknowledged caused him to enter a "massive" state of depression during this time. He credits the culture of graffiti art with helping him through those years of his life.

Downey was a co-founder of Under Pressure in 1995. He has acknowledged that the first festival was intended as a joke, undertaken in response to crackdowns from the city and police; this notwithstanding, he has also said that the festival eventually became a means of keeping debates around graffiti in the public eye and of informing skeptical Montrealers of different sides to the issue. Under Pressure is now the longest running graffiti festival in the world, with the Drogheda Bridge Jam being the longest running graffiti event.

Downey has frequently commented on various issues surrounding graffiti art, including its legal status and the motivations of its creators. "You're doing it for free," he said in 2001. "You have to accept that it may disappear or be crossed out the next day." He has acknowledged the ethical dilemmas of the practice, describing the art as, "illegal, but romantic," and at one point saying, "If I go and paint something on a building without permission, I must take responsibility for my actions. I know right from wrong." In the 2010s, he encouraged a group of youth from the Pointe-Saint-Charles YMCA to protect a mural in their area from vandalism; in relation to this matter, he has said, "If you want to change the direction of something, you need to use positive actions, not negative ones."

In 2006, Downey invited city councillor Marcel Tremblay to come to the Under Pressure festival, after Tremblay had publicly advocated for a new law targeting graffiti artists. Tremblay accepted the offer and had an extended conversation with Downey during the event. Downey remarked that he respected Tremblay for doing this, even if their viewpoints were ultimately different.

Downney subsequently branched out into advertising and became the creative director of a group called Faux Amis. He organized an event called the Sneaker Pimps Tour in 2008, featuring 1,500 editions of rare sneakers.

In 2014, Downey argued that graffiti artists should receive credit for the use of their images in copyrighted media such as movies and video games.

== City Councillor ==
Downey was elected to Montreal city council in the 2013 municipal election, winning a close contest over actor Sébastien Dhavernas of the Équipe Denis Coderre pour Montréal party in the Verdun division of Desmarchais-Crawford. Projet Montréal emerged as the main opposition party on council in this election, and Downey was appointed as the party's critic on homelessness and animal issues. By virtue of his position on city council, he also serves on the Verdun borough council.

In May 2015, Downey brought forward a motion to permit skateboarders to make use of Montreal's bike paths. The motion was unanimously accepted. He subsequently led a successful drive for the Verdun borough council to approve an upgraded skateboard park in the area, and in early 2016 he successfully advocated for Verdun to ban new drive-through establishments on the grounds that they would encourage unnecessary automobile use.

Downey brought forward a motion in January 2016 to require that "heat stop" buildings, wherein homeless people can gather for warmth, be opened whenever Montreal's temperature falls to -15 degrees Celsius. Montreal's existing law indicated these facilities would only open if the temperature fell to -27. Shortly thereafter, Downey called for the city to approve an anti-bullying policy with greater protection in public spaces, including parks and transit.

Also in 2016, Downey was one of only two city councillors to vote against changing the name of Montreal's Vimy Park to honour former Quebec premier Jacques Parizeau. He said he was "saddened" that no one involved in the process considered that removing the former name, which honoured fallen Canadian soldiers from the Battle of Vimy Ridge, "might actually insult somebody." A newspaper report on the matter indicated that Downey was an associate member of the Royal Canadian Legion branch in Verdun.

Following a calèche accident resulting in an injury to a horse, he called for the city to either regulate the calèche industry effectively or abolish it. He later opposed calls for a pit bull ban in the city, calling instead for "responsible ownership."

== Electoral record ==
2017 Montreal municipal election: Councillor, Desmarchais-Crawford
Party	Candidate	Votes	%	±%
Projet Montréal	Sterling Downey	5,799	57.98	+33.18
Équipe Denis Coderre	Marie-Eve Brunet	4,203	42.02	+19.49
Total valid votes		10,002	100	–
Total rejected ballots		201	1.97	–
Turnout		10,203	46.00	+2.32
Electors on the lists		22,181	–	–
Source: Election results, 2017, City of Montreal.

2013 Montreal municipal election: Councillor, Desmarchais-Crawford
Party	Candidate	Votes	%	±%
Projet Montréal	Sterling Downey	2,306	24.80	+1.19
Équipe Denis Coderre	Sébastien Dhavernas	2,095	22.53	
Vrai changement	Marie-Josée Parent	1,917	20.62	
Option Verdun / Montréal	Richard Langlais	1,523	16.38	
Coalition Montréal	Françoise Gloutnay	1,082	11.64	
Équipe Andrée Champoux	France Caya	376	4.04	
Total valid votes		9,299	100	–
Total rejected ballots		319	3.32	–
Turnout		9,618	43.68	+6.68
Electors on the lists		22,017	–	–
Source: Election results, 2013, City of Montreal.
