= Marie Cinq-Mars =

Canadian politician

Borough mayor for Outremont and Montreal City Councillor
- In office 2007–2017
- Preceded by: Stéphane Harbour
- Succeeded by: Philipe Tomlinson

Personal details
- Party: Union Montréal (2007-2012); Équipe conservons Outremont (2013-)
- Occupation: Artist, teacher

Marie Cinq-Mars was borough mayor of Outremont from 2007 to 2017. She is a former member of the Union Montreal municipal political party.

Cinq-Mars was first elected as a city councillor with the former city of Outremont in 1999. Following Outremont's merger with Montreal, she was then elected as a city councillor representing the borough of Outremont in 2002. She sat on the city of Montreal's executive committee where she was responsible for the portfolios of culture, heritage, design and the status of women.

Cinq-Mars holds a degree in Communications from Concordia University and in Arts from the Université du Québec à Montréal. She is a professional artist and was a teacher until 2007.
