= Montréal 2025 =

Modernization plan for Montreal, Canada

Montréal 2025 is the modernization plan for the city of Montreal with innovative and avant-garde projects. Those include the Quartier des Spectacles and the Quartier de la Santé.

== Quartier des spectacles ==
Quartier des Spectacles is an entertainment district that is projected to cost 1.9 billion dollars. The construction began in 2008 and the project is planned to be completed in 2025.

=== Secteur Place des Arts ===
The secteur Place des Arts is a vast project to transform the area round Place des Arts. Le secteur place des arts will be a unique public space with grassy public space. The construction began in 2008 and is excepted to be completed in 2012. The Secteur Place des Arts will cost $147 million.

=== 2-22 Sainte-Catherine ===
The 2-22 is a $19.5 million project in the former quartier du Red Light de Montréal. The 2-22 is a six-floor building which will provide modern studios for cultural uses. The construction was to have begun in 2010 and was expected to be completed in 2012. The building will be LEED certified.

=== Montreal Symphony House ===
The Montreal Symphony House is a modern concert hall which is aims to be LEED certified. The Symphony House bears the signature of the acoustician Russell Johnson and meet the highest standards in acoustics. The project will cost $266 million. The construction began in 2009 and is planned to be completed in 2011.

=== Maison du développement durable ===
The Maison du développement durable is a large hub for synergy. The building will house various non-profit organization including Équiterre. The $43 million building aims to be LEED certified and will be completed in 2011.

=== Métro Saint-Laurent ===
The $30 million project will focus on the redevelopment of the Métro Saint-Laurent with more than 20,000 square feet (1,900 m^{2}). The project close out fall 2012 and will aims to be LEED certified.

=== Quadrilatère Saint-Laurent ===
The $160 million project aims to build over 100,000 square feet (9,300 m^{2}) of office space and 60,000 square feet (5,600 m^{2}) of local business. The project aims to build LEED certified buildings.

== Havre de Montréal ==
The Havre de Montréal is the largest project in Montréal. The $6.4 billion project aims to redeveloping Griffintown and the waterfront. The project also aims to expanding recreational and tourist attractions. The Havre de Montréal also aims to introduce a new Tramway and to retrofit the Bonaventure Expressway.

== Montréal Technopole ==
Montréal Technopole is a huge project aiming to building a world class city of knowledge with over 3,000 cutting-edge establishments and nearly 200 research centres. Both the Centre hospitalier de l'Université de Montréal (CHUM) and McGill University Health Centre (MUHC) are part of the Montréal Technopole project.

== Quartier de la vie ==
The Quartier de la vie is a vast project which aims to introduce new museums. The aims is to expand Canada's largest natural science museum complex. The project is expected to cost $189 million. The project began in 2009 and is expected to be complete in 2017.

=== Planetarium Rio Tinto Alcan ===
The Planetarium Rio Tinto Alcan is a $33 million project to relocated the Planetarium with a new design near the Stade Olympique de Montréal. The Planétarium will be LEED certified. The project began in 2010 and is expected to be complete in 2012.

=== Centre sur la biodiversité ===
The Biodiversity Centre is a $24.5 million project to build a green building LEED certified with state-of-the-art laboratories. The Biodiversity Centre will be complete in 2010.
