= Normand Marinacci =

Canadian politician

Normand Marinacci is a Canadian politician, who served on Montreal City Council as the borough mayor of L'Île-Bizard–Sainte-Geneviève and as Agglomeration council member.

First elected in the 2013 municipal election as a member of Mélanie Joly's Vrai changement pour Montréal party, he switched his affiliation to Projet Montréal in June 2017.
