= Claude Trudel =

Canadian politician

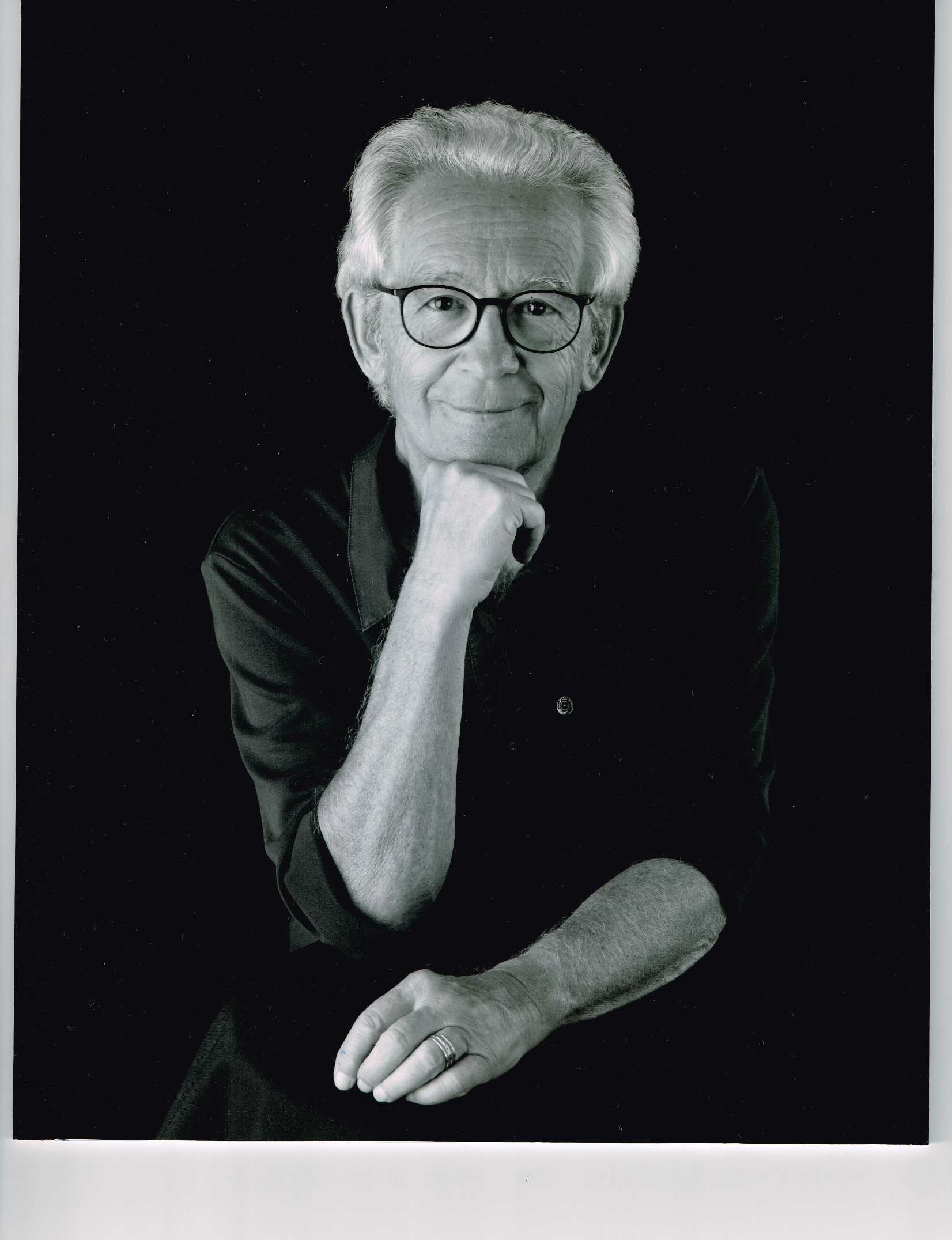
- Trudel in 2017

Borough mayor for Verdun and Montreal City Councillor
- In office January 1, 2002 – December 4, 2012
- Preceded by: Position created
- Succeeded by: Ginette Marotte

MNA for Bourget
- In office 1985–1989
- Preceded by: Camille Laurin
- Succeeded by: Huguette Boucher-Bacon

Personal details
- Born: March 2, 1942 (age 84)
- Party: Quebec Liberal Party (provincial); Union Montreal (2001-2012)

Claude Trudel (born March 2, 1942) is a Canadian politician. He served as the borough mayor of Verdun in the city of Montreal, Quebec from 2002 to 2012. He was a member of the Union Montreal party.

== Career ==
In 2001, he was elected as a Montreal city councillor as a member of Union Montreal. He was reelected in 2005 as the borough mayor of Verdun. He was named majority leader at city council, and was president of the Société de transport de Montréal. He was reelected as Verdun borough mayor in 2009, following the 2009 Montreal municipal election and quit that post on December 4, 2012, stating that he was disenchanted with the fickle nature of political life in light of the "circus" following former mayor Gérald Tremblay's departure, referring to new Montreal Mayor Michael Applebaum and what he called the "betrayal" of his fellow city councillors.

He was named to the Montreal Executive Committee as the person responsible for public safety.

Trudel served as the Quebec Liberal Party Member of the National Assembly of Quebec for the Bourget electoral district from 1985 to 1989.

== Education ==
He studied at Collège Saint-Viateur in Outremont before receiving a law degree from Université de Montréal in 1967. He was admitted to the Bar of Quebec in 1968. He obtained a master's degree from the London School of Economics in 1969.
