= Marie-Josée Parent =

Former city councillor in Verdun, Quebec

- Marie-Josée Parent in 2016.

Montreal City Councillor for Champlain–L'Île-des-Sœurs
- In office 2017–2021
- Preceded by: Manon Gauthier
- Succeeded by: Véronique Tremblay

Personal details
- Party: Ensemble Montréal; Projet Montréal

Marie-Josée Parent is a former city councillor of Montréal, first elected to Champlain–L'Île-des-Sœurs in 2017. She has served as a councillor under the parties Ensemble Montréal and Projet Montréal.

She identifies as Indigenous, but this is challenged by genealogists.

== Background ==
Marie-Josée Parent grew up in Gatineau, Quebec. Prior to her career in politics, Parent was the director-general of DestiNATIONS, an Indigenous arts and culture promoter organization. Parent identifies as Mi'kmaw on her father's side, and Acadien on her mother's side. She has a sister, André-Yanne Parent, who cofounded DestiNATIONS with her.

== Political career ==
Parent was described as the first Indigenous city councillor in Montreal when she was elected to Champlain–L'Île-des-Sœurs in the 2017 Montreal municipal election. She ran under the party Ensemble Montréal when she was first elected, but later became an independent in 2018. As an independent, Parent became the councillor responsible for Indigenous reconciliation under the Plante administration. She joined Projet Montréal in 2019.

Parent presided over the closure of Verdun Beach. She said there were safety concerns due to poor water quality, due to water flowing out of the local sanitation network. Parent gave the nearby Verdun Natatorium and Arthur-Therrien pool as alternatives.

=== Indigenous identity dispute and resignation ===
Parent's genealogy was investigated (Note: Journalist Ka’nhehsí:io Deer compared the questioning of Parent's identity to the case of Sherri Rollins.) in 2019 by Dominique Ritchot, coordinator of the Société généalogique canadienne-française, and Mohawk genealogist Eric Pouliot-Thisdale. They said they found no Indigenous ancestors on her father's side, which she presents as of Mi'kmaq descent. (Note: Pouliot-Thisdale said one of her paternal ancestors from the 1600s, Marianne Cormier, had been cited having "unknown aboriginal origins", but was from France.) Pouliot-Thisdale said he found one ancestor 12 generations up her mother's side named Michel Haché-Gallant, who was married in 1690. He said some genealogical sources said Haché-Gallant's mother had been Indigenous.

==== Reactions and resignation ====
Parent questioned the genealogical research into her identity, labeling it lateral violence. She said her identity came from a family oral tradition to a culture which they had lost many ties with. She said her sister also identifies as Indigenous, saying "My and my sister’s identities go beyond a genealogical tree." She said her family did not know which community they were from, and they had not completed their family tree. Pouliot-Thisdale said that the sisters benefited from grants intended for Indigenous people.

Parent stepped down from her position leading reconciliation with First Nations after the investigation by Richot and Pouliot-Thisdale. Then-Mayor Valérie Plante said Parent had shown good faith and sensitivity around issues of identity (Note: Journalist Caroline Montpetit links Parent's questioning to author Daphnée Poirier's assertion that identification with First Nations identity is delicate. Poirier writes that they are placed into climate of mistrust, such that the threat of identity theft is constant.) by stepping down. Lionel Perez, who Parent had previously shared a party with, said she had 'fooled everybody' regarding her ancestry. He said the party had conducted background checks on members, but had not conducted background checks into ancestry.

==== Scholarly analysis ====
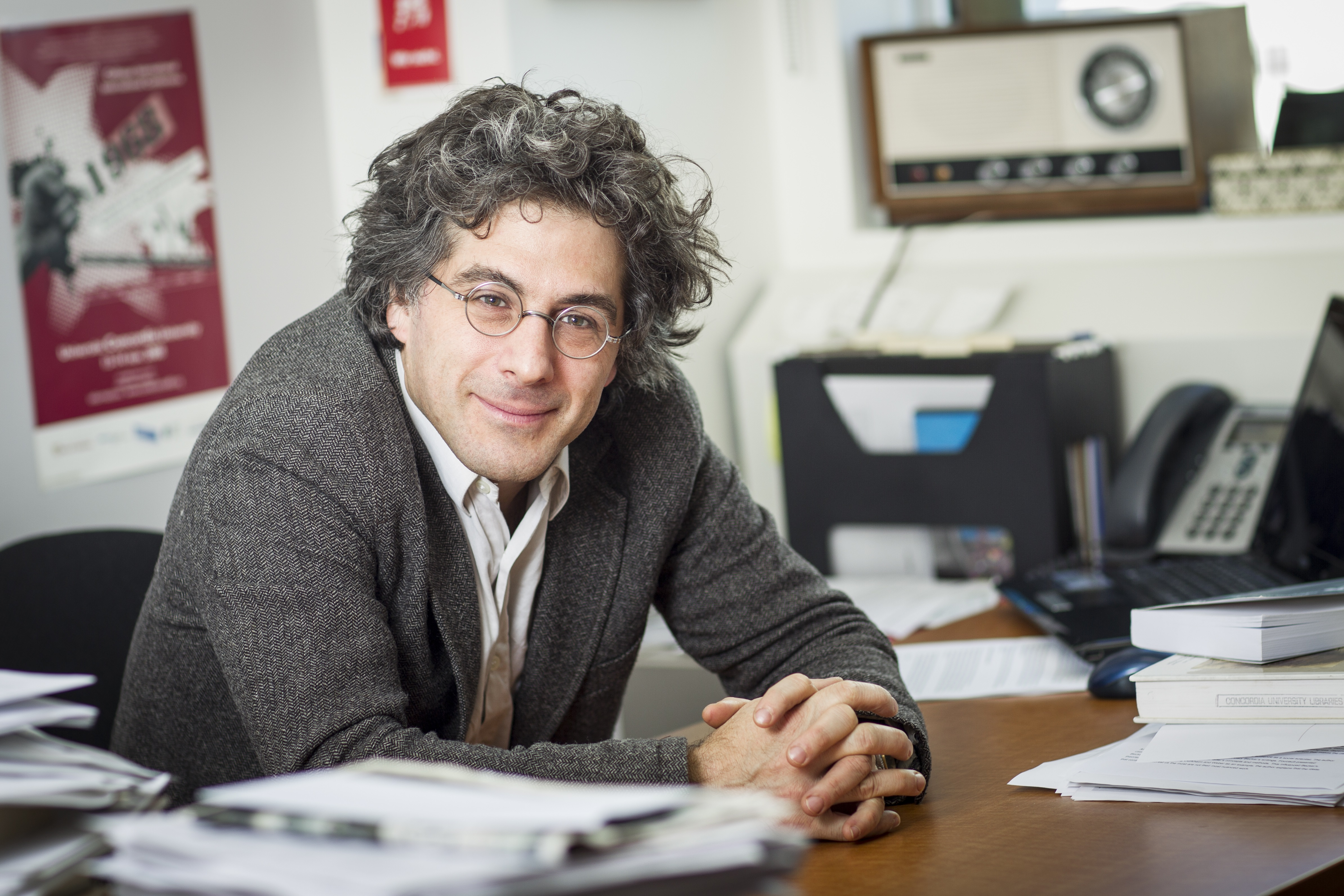
Jean-Philippe Warren says further analysis into the appropriation of Indigenous identity is needed.

When interviewed regarding Parent, associate professor Darryl Leroux said that approximately 200,000 people of French descent in Quebec and neighbouring areas claim Indigenous decent. He gave several motivations for this, such as tax breaks, hunting and fishing rights, identification with Native American culture, differentiation from British colonists, and desire for belonging.

Sociologist Jean-Philippe Warren referenced the case of Marie-Josée Parent when reviewing Leroux's book, Distorted Descent. While positively reviewing the work, he writes that Indigenous identity appropriation could not only be attributed to white supremacism. He says that Parent's claim of Mi'kmaq ancestry while lacking Indigenous ancestors could not solely be explained through a masculinist and white supremacist lens. He expresses similar doubts with regards to seekers of Indigenous heritage from the Saguenay–Lac-Saint-Jean region.

== See also ==
- Acadians in Quebec
- Aref Salem
- Buffy Sainte-Marie
- Cathy Wong
- Carrie Bourassa
- Denis Coderre
- Grey Owl
- Jean-François Parenteau
- Mary Ellen Turpel-Lafond
- Suzanne Décarie
- Thomas King (novelist)
- Vianne Timmons
