= Sébastien Dhavernas =

Canadian actor and politician

- Born: 19 January 1950 (age 76); Montreal, Quebec, Canada
- Occupation: Actor
- Years active: 1975–present
- Spouse: Michèle Deslauriers
- Children: Caroline Dhavernas; Gabrielle Dhavernas

Sébastien Dhavernas (born 19 January 1950) is a Canadian actor.

== Career ==
Dhavernas was born in Montreal, Quebec. He is the husband of actress Michèle Deslauriers and the father of actress Caroline Dhavernas and voice actress Gabrielle Dhavernas. He completed his classical studies at Collège Stanislas, did a year in Sociology at McGill University, and subsequently attended the Conservatoire d'art dramatique de Montréal.

In addition to acting, Dhavernas has done French-language voice dubbing, attaining some fame as the voice of Roger Rabbit in the French-language version of the film Who Framed Roger Rabbit. In 1989, he urged the government of Canada to pass legislation requiring that the majority of French-dubbed television programs in Quebec actually be dubbed in the province, rather than in France. He was later described as being responsible for overseeing dubbing issues in Quebec's Union des artistes. Dhavernas has also acted in theatre, including in a Quebec production of Les Misérables, and has served as president of the Canadian Artists and Producers Professional Relations Tribunal (CAPPRT).

Dhavernas ran for the Liberal Party of Canada in the Montreal riding of Outremont in the 2008 federal election, campaigning against cuts to arts funding that had been introduced by the Conservative government of Stephen Harper. He made his decision to run only days before the election. Ultimately, he finished second against New Democratic Party incumbent and future party leader Thomas Mulcair. Following the election, Dhavernas was appointed to a Liberal Party political commission headed by Serge Joyal. Dhavernas intended to run for the Liberal nomination in Outremont again in the buildup to the 2011 election, but he was advised that the seat would be reserved for a star candidate.

He ran for Montreal city council in the 2013 municipal election as a candidate of Équipe Denis Coderre pour Montréal in Verdun division of Desmarchais-Crawford and narrowly lost to Sterling Downey of Projet Montréal.

Dhavernas has written for HuffPost's French language Quebec site.

== Selected filmography ==
- René Lévesque (2008) .... Robert Bourassa
- Trudeau II: Maverick in the Making (2005) (TV) .... Parisian Publisher
- Maurice Richard: Histoire d'un Canadien (1999) .... Voix à la radio
- Réseaux (1998–1999) ... J. C. Michaud
- Watatatow (1991–2005) ... André Dubuc
- The Gunrunner (1984) .... Fred Samuel
- Le temps d'une paix (1980–1986) .... Raoul Savary
- Le pont (1976) .... Gilles
- Y'a pas de problème (1975–1977) .... Michelle Duquette

== Dubbing ==
=== Films ===
==== Feature films ====
List of television appearances, with year, title, and role shown
Year	Title	Role	Dubbing actor	Notes
1988	The Dead Pool	Johnny Squares	Jim Carrey	
1990	Teenage Mutant Ninja Turtles	Michelangelo	Robbie Rist	Voice
1991	Teenage Mutant Ninja Turtles II	Michelangelo	Robbie Rist	Voice
1992	Loaded Weapon 1	Jack Colt	Emilio Estevez	
1994	Pulp Fiction	Ringo	Tim Roth	
1994	Dumb and Dumber	Harry Dunne	Jeff Daniels	
1996	101 Dalmatians	Jasper	Hugh Laurie	
1996	Scream	Dewey	David Arquette	
1997	Scream 2	Dewey	David Arquette	
1999	Star Wars: Episode I	Jar Jar Binks	Ahmed Best	Voice
1999	Hurlyburly	Eddie	Sean Penn	
2001	I Am Sam	Sam	Sean Penn	
2001	Domestic Disturbance	Ray Coleman	Steve Buscemi	
2001	The Secret Agent Club	Lisp	Robert Patrick	
2001	Harry Potter and the Philosopher's Stone	Lord Voldemort	Ian Hart	
2002	Star Wars: Episode II	Jar-Jar Binks	Ahmed Best	Voice
2003	21 Grams	Paul Rivers	Sean Penn	
2005	The Interpreter	Tobin Keller	Sean Penn	
2006	Good Night, and Good Luck	Edward R. Murrow	David Strathairn	
2006	Even Money	Victor	Tim Roth	
2008	The Incredible Hulk	Abomination	Tim Roth	
2008	What Just Happened	Himself	Sean Penn	
2008	Milk	Harvey Milk	Sean Penn	
2008	300	Dilios	David Wenham	
2009	G-Force	Speckles	Nicolas Cage	Voice
2009	Scooby-Doo! The Mystery Begins	Principal Deedle	Shawn MacDonald	Voice
2009	Watchmen	Wally Weaver	Rob LaBelle	
2010	Knight and Day	Antonio	Jordi Mollá	
2010	Grown Ups	Wiley	Steve Buscemi	
2011	The Tree of Life	Jack	Sean Penn	
2011	Scream 4	Dewey	David Arquette	
2012	Looper	Jack Abe Mitchell	Jeff Daniels	
2012	Arbitrage	Michael Bryer	Tim Roth	
2012	The Expendables 2	Booker	Chuck Norris	
2012	The Three Stooges	Larry	Sean Hayes	
2013	Grown Ups 2	Wiley	Steve Buscemi	
2013	Gangster Squad	Mickey Cohen	Sean Penn	
2014	The Secret Life of Walter Mitty	Sean O'Connell	Sean Penn	
2014	Dumb and Dumber To	Harry Dunne	Jeff Daniels	
2015	Danny Collins	Danny Collins	Al Pacino	
2015	The Martian	Teddy Sanders	Jeff Daniels	
2016	The Divergent Series: Allegiant	David	Jeff Daniels	
2018	The Happytime Murders	Mr Serpent	Marc Maron	Voice
2022	Scream	Dwight Riley	David Arquette	
2023	Asteroid City	The Detective	Fisher Stevens	
2026	Scream 7	Dwight Riley	David Arquette	

==== Animated feature films ====
List of television appearances, with year, title, and role shown
Year	Title	Role	Dubbing actor	Notes
1987-1989	Babar	Zephir	Jeff Pustil	
1987	A Garfield Christmas	Doc Boy	David L. Lander	
1988	Who Framed Roger Rabbit	Roger Rabbit	Charles Fleischer	
1988-1995	Garfield and Friends	Orson and Bigoudi	Gregg Berger	
1989	Babar: The Movie	Zephir	Jeff Pustil	
1989	All Dogs Go to Heaven	Dog Caster	Daryl Gilley	
1990	Cartoon All-Stars to the Rescue	Bugs Bunny / Daffy Duck / Michelangelo	Jeff Bergman	
1992-1995	The Adventures of Grady Greenspace	Scuzzy		
1994	A Troll in Central Park	Llort	Charles Nelson Reilly	
1997	Hercules	Hermes	Paul Shaffer	
1998	Mulan	Chi Fu	James Hong	
1998	A Bug's Life	Francis	Denis Leary	
1999	South Park: Bigger, Longer & Uncut	Eric Cartman	Trey Parker	
1999-2001	Zoboomafoo	Himself	Martin Kratt	
2001	Atlantis: The Lost Empire	Gaetan Molière	Corey Burton	
2002	Treasure Planet	B.E.N.	Martin Short	
2003	Atlantis: Milo's Return	Mole	Corey Burton	
2006	Cars	Bob Cutlass	Bob Costas	
2007	TMNT	Michelangelo	Mikey Kelley	
2008	Star Wars: The Clone Wars	Jar Jar Binks		
2008	Space Chimps	Zartog	Jeff Daniels	
2008	The Tale of Despereaux	Andre	Kevin Kline	
2011	Cars 2	Mel Dorado	Patrick Walker	
2012	The Lorax	Mr. O'Hare	Rob Riggle	
2012	Hotel Transylvania	Wayne	Steven Buscemi	
2012	Wreck-It Ralph	Mr. Litwak	Ed O'Neill	

== Electoral record ==
  2013 Montreal municipal election: Councillor, Desmarchais-Crawford
  Party	Candidate	Votes	%	±%
  Projet Montréal	Sterling Downey	2,306	24.80	+1.19
  Équipe Denis Coderre	Sébastien Dhavernas	2,095	22.53	
  Vrai changement	Marie-Josée Parent	1,917	20.62	
  Option Verdun / Montréal	Richard Langlais	1,523	16.38	
  Coalition Montréal	Françoise Gloutnay	1,082	11.64	
  Équipe Andrée Champoux	France Caya	376	4.04	
  Total valid votes		9,299	100	–
  Total rejected ballots		319	3.32	–
  Turnout		9,618	43.68	+6.68
  Electors on the lists		22,017	–	–
  Source: Election results, 2013, City of Montreal.
  2008 Canadian federal election: Outremont
  Party	Candidate	Votes	%	±%	Expenditures
  New Democratic	Tom Mulcair	14,348	39.53	−7.97	$69,072
  Liberal	Sébastien Dhavernas	12,005	33.08	+4.12	$45,118
  Bloc Québécois	Marcela Valdivia	4,554	12.55	+1.62	$48,279
  Conservative	Lulzim Laloshi	3,820	10.53	+1.96	$25,770
  Green	François Pilon	1,566	4.31	+2.10	not listed
  Total valid votes		36,293	100.00		
  Total rejected ballots		253	0.69		
  Turnout		36,546	56.11	+18.68	
  Electors on the lists		64,556			
  New Democratic hold		Swing		−6.05	
  Source: Official Voting Results, 40th General Election 2008, Elections Canada. Percentage change totals are in relation to a 2007 by-election, not to the previous general election.
