= Lionel Perez (politician) =

Canadian politician

Borough mayor for Côte-des-Neiges-Notre-Dame-de-Grace
- In office November 22, 2012 – November 14, 2013
- Preceded by: Michael Applebaum
- Succeeded by: Russell Copeman

Montreal City Councillor for Darlington
- In office January 1, 2010 – November 18, 2021
- Preceded by: Saulie Zajdel
- Succeeded by: Stephanie Valenzuela

Personal details
- Born: 1970 (age 55–56)
- Party: Union Montréal (2009–2012); Independent (2012–2013); Équipe Denis Coderre (2013–2018); Ensemble Montréal (2018–present)
- Occupation: Lawyer, entrepreneur

Lionel Jonathan Perez (born 1970 in Montreal, Quebec) is a Canadian lawyer, entrepreneur and a former member of Montreal City Council for the Darlington district in Côte-des-Neiges-Notre-Dame-de-Grace. On November 21, 2012, he was elected borough mayor of Côte-des-Neiges-Notre-Dame-de-Grace by acclamation, replacing Michael Applebaum after the latter was selected as the new Mayor of Montreal. He is of Sephardi Jewish descent.

Originally elected as a member of Union Montréal, Perez sat as an independent councillor from December 2012 until August 2013, when he affiliated with the new Équipe Denis Coderre. In the 2013 election, he ran for re-election to his original council seat in Darlington rather than as borough mayor and was re-elected. In 2017, he was re-elected for a third term as City Councillor for Darlington. However, he decided to run for the Borough Mayor position for the 2021 Montreal municipal election under the banner of Ensemble Montréal but was defeated by Projet Montréal candidate, Gracia Kasoki Katahwa.

== Education ==
Perez holds a Juris Doctor (J.D.) degree from Osgoode Hall Law School in Toronto and a Bachelor of Civil Law (B.C.L.) from the Faculty of Law of the Université de Montréal. He also holds a Bachelor of Arts degree in Political Science.

== Law career ==
Before being elected, Perez was a practicing lawyer and co-founder of the Canadian legal document filing service company CorporationCentre.ca. Under his guidance, CorporationCentre.ca has garnered much recognition from numerous publications including the PROFIT HOT 50 and PROFIT 100 rankings, both published annually by Profit, Enterprise Magazine and L'Actualité. Perez has also developed an expertise in advising startups and has written on the business and legal aspects of business formation and its impact on small business owners.

Prior to founding CorporationCentre.ca, Perez practiced corporate commercial law with a technology law firm advising start-ups and publicly traded corporations.

In October 2010, Perez appeared as legal counsel on behalf the JORCCQ before the Quebec National Assembly commission to present its brief on the government’s draft legislation (Bill 94) governing reasonable accommodation when receiving or delivering government services.

== City councillor ==
He won a decisive victory beating his closest rival by over 20 per cent of the vote in his first election on November 1, 2009, running under the Union Montréal party of Mayor Gérald Tremblay.

He was appointed to serve on the Commission on Finances, Administrative Services, and Human Capital. He was also named to the Land Use and Planning Commission of the Communauté Metropolitaine de Montréal. At the borough level, he was the official elected representative on the Comité consultatif d'urbanise (CCU). In December 2010 he was named vice-president, and ranking member of the governing Union Montréal party, to the new Commission on the Examination of Contracts.

Perez made Canadian news headlines in May 2011 after he spoke up against the use of inappropriate Twitter remarks by a fellow councillor during council meetings. Opposition city councillor Benoit Dorais posted insulting comments on his Twitter account about the Union Montréal members during a council meeting, some of which were directed at Perez. The comments provoked Perez to bring the issue to the attention of council so that an examination of the rules governing council's proceedings should be extended to cover social media as well. Perez was not against the use of Twitter during council meetings but rather wished to ensure the appropriateness of the language used by council members on Twitter while in session. Perez’s intervention resulted in a new policy on Twitter use by councillors, allowing councillors to use Twitter while council is in session, but with caution against using insulting or "unparliamentary" language as set out in a list of 225 words and phrases banned by the National Assembly of Quebec. The ruling is believed to be the first of its kind governing a municipal council in Canada.
