= Ginette Marotte =

Canadian politician

Ginette Marotte is politician in Montreal, Quebec, Canada. She served on the Montreal city council from 2005 to 2013 and was mayor of the Verdun borough council from 2012 to 2013.

== Borough councillor ==
Marotte was elected for the Champlain division on the Verdun borough council in the 2001 Montreal municipal election as a candidate of Gérald Tremblay's Montreal Island Citizens Union (MICU). She served for a full four-year term. MICU held all of the borough council's five seats in this period, which coincided with Tremblay's first term as mayor.

== City councillor and borough mayor ==
Marotte was elected to the Montreal city council in the 2005 municipal election for the Champlain–L'Île-des-Sœurs division. Tremblay was elected to a second term as mayor in this election, and MICU won a majority of seats on council; Marotte subsequently served as a backbench supporter of the administration. She also continued to serve on the Verdun borough council by virtue of holding her position on city council and was appointed to chair the borough's environment committee. In September 2009, she and borough mayor Claude Trudel introduced the first composter acquired by a municipal administration in Quebec.

Marotte was re-elected to city council as a member of the renamed Union Montreal party in the 2009 municipal election. She continued to serve as chair of the borough environment committee and also served on the city's committee on transport and environmental management.

Gerald Tremblay's administration became engulfed in a serious corruption scandal in late 2012, and Tremblay resigned as mayor on November 5, 2012. Marotte resigned from Union Montreal shortly thereafter to sit as an independent. Claude Trudel also resigned as borough mayor of Verdun in December 2012, and Marotte was chosen by the other council members as his replacement. She served in this position for a year and did not seek re-election in the 2013 municipal election.

During her second term on city council, Marotte served as associate councillor responsible for sustainable development, the environment, and parks, and for Mosaïcultures Internationales Montréal 2013.

== Electoral record ==
Quebec provincial by-election, December 5, 2016: Verdun
Party	Candidate	Votes	%	±%
Liberal	Isabelle Melançon	5,116	35.61	-14.98
Parti Québécois	Richard Langlais	3,900	27.15	+2.78
Québec solidaire	Véronique Martineau	2,669	18.58	+8.93
Coalition Avenir Québec	Ginette Marotte	1,829	12.73	+0.50
Green	David Cox	615	4.28	+2.18
Option nationale	Frédéric Dénommé	115	0.80	+0.33
Conservative	David Girard	94	0.65	–
Équipe Autonomiste	Sébastien Poirier	27	0.19	–
Total valid votes		14,365	100.00	
Rejected and declined votes		138		
Turnout		14,503	29.15	-41.54
Electors on the lists		49,758		
Liberal hold		Swing		-8.88
Source: Official Results (by-elections), Le Directeur général des élections du Québec.

2009 Montreal municipal election: Councillor, Champlain–L'Île-des-Sœurs
Party	Candidate	Votes	%	±%
Union Montreal	Ginette Marotte	3,430	36.51	−19.18
Vision Montreal	Catherine Chauvin	3,289	35.01	+8.44
Projet Montréal	Alain Fredet	2,160	22.99	+16.19
Montréal Ville-Marie	Denise Larouche	516	5.49	
Total valid votes		9,395	100	–
Total rejected ballots		326	5.33	–
Turnout		9,721	39.49	–
Electors on the lists		24,618	–	–
Source: Election results, 2009, City of Montreal.

2005 Montreal municipal election: City Councillor, Champlain–L'Île-des-Sœurs
Party	Candidate	Votes	%
Citizens Union	Ginette Marotte	4,176	55.69
Vision Montreal	Daniel Beaudin	1,992	26.57
Independent	Robert Filiatrault	695	9.27
Projet Montréal	Guylaine Vignola	510	6.80
Independent	François Desrochers	125	1.67
Total valid votes		7,498	100
Source: City of Montreal official results (in French), City of Montreal.

2001 Montreal municipal election: Verdun borough Councillor, Champlain
Party	Candidate	Votes	%
Citizens Union	Ginette Marotte	5,026	49.29
Vision Montreal	Robert Filiatrault	4,761	46.69
Independent	Cook Gosselin	410	4.02
Total valid votes		10,197	100
Source: Election results, 1833–2005 (in French), City of Montreal.
