= Union Montreal =

Union Montreal Union Montréal
- Former municipal party
- Founded: September 30, 2001
- Dissolved: May 9, 2013
- Ideology: Centrism; Liberalism; Social liberalism Federalism; Neoliberalism; Environmentalism
- Political position: Centre
- Colours: Yellow and Blue (also Green, Brown and Pink)

Union Montreal (French: Union Montréal) is an inactive municipal political party in Montreal, Quebec, Canada. It was the governing party in the city from 2001, when it won its first election under mayor Gérald Tremblay, until 2012. The party remained the largest single party caucus in the city government until the 2013 election although it lost its majority in November 2012 due to a number of councillors quitting the party to sit as independents in the wake of Tremblay's resignation. Since 2013, it has no longer been politically active.

== Origins ==
Union Montreal was originally established as the Montreal Island Citizens Union (MICU, French: Union des citoyens et des citoyennes de l’Île de Montréal or UCIM) in the aftermath of the province-wide municipal merger of 2001 and not long before the municipal election of that same year. It was the product of a merger between the Montreal Citizens' Movement (RCM) and a group of suburban politicians who backed Gérald Tremblay for mayor.

== Electoral performance ==
Tremblay was the party's first mayoral candidate and was elected with 49% of the vote over incumbent Pierre Bourque. He was re-elected in 2005 with 54% of the vote against the same candidate, and again in 2009 over Vision Montreal's Louise Harel and Projet Montreal's Richard Bergeron.

== Change of name ==
In May 2007, Tremblay announced that the party would take its current name: Union Montreal. He also unveiled a new party logo. Instead of the yellow and blue logo used by the party from 2001 to 2007, a new multicolored symbol that represents Montreal's diversity would take place. The new label consisted of five vertical stripes (blue, green, brown, yellow and pink), each bearing one of the letters of the word UNION.

== Tremblay crisis ==
During a hearing at the Charbonneau Commission on October 1, 2012, construction industry contractor Lino Zambito alleged that Union Montreal received a sum equivalent to three per cent of the value of sewerage rehabilitation contracts awarded by the City of Montreal to a mafia-linked cartel.

On October 30, 2012, a former Union Montreal party organizer alleged that Mayor Tremblay was involved in illegal financing with the mafia. He claimed that Tremblay knew of these dubious financial practices and did not want to be made aware of them. These statements caused a series of negative reactions from the spokespeople of all the provincial political parties.

Following the allegations, Tremblay announced that he would be taking a few days off. On November 5, 2012, Tremblay announced that he was resigning as mayor, and was leaving politics. Following his resignation, Union Montreal councillors Frantz Benjamin, Michael Applebaum, Lionel Perez, Susan Clarke, Marvin Rotrand, Christian Dubois, Daniel Bélanger, Ginette Marotte, Alain Tassé and Frank Venneri all left the party to sit as independents. Seven more city and borough councillors resigned in February 2013, including the entire borough council of Anjou.

The party selected Richard Deschamps as its new candidate for Mayor of Montreal in the council vote on November 16. However, Deschamps was defeated 31 to 29 by Applebaum, who pledged to run a non-partisan coalition council in which members of all parties, as well as the bloc of independents, would share seats on the Montreal Executive Committee. However, Applebaum was arrested in April 2013 and charged with 14 counts including fraud and breach of trust. Applebaum stepped down the following day and was succeeded by another temporary mayor that was not from Union Montreal.

On May 9, 2013, the party declared its intention to apply for dissolution, with the remaining members becoming independents. In the runup to the 2013 municipal election campaign, several of its former members rallied around the candidacy of Denis Coderre, who also attracted support from former Vision Montréal councillors and others. Coderre became mayor in November 2013.

== The aftermath ==
Union Montreal's initial plan to apply for dissolution was withdrawn by September 2013, as it decided to stay in existence until the resolution of the Charbonneau commission. Quebec's director general of elections proceeded with the dissolution process in September 2013 because the party had neither named a new chief nor provided a list of its members, both of which are mandatory to maintain party status.

In November 2013, a Quebec appeals court ruled that the party could continue to exist. The decision was reiterated in February 2015 in Quebec Superior Court. The party is no longer active politically.

== Mayoral candidates ==
Election	Mayoral Candidate	Popular Vote for Mayor	Number of Councillors
**2001**	**Gérald Tremblay**	**49.11%**	**41/73**
**2005**	**Gérald Tremblay**	**53.73%**	**47/64**
**2009**	**Gérald Tremblay**	**37.90%**	**38/64**

Victories are indicated in bold.
