= Micheline Daigle =

Micheline Daigle is a former politician in Montreal, Quebec, Canada. She served on the Montreal city council from 1986 to 1994 as a member of the Montreal Citizens' Movement (MCM).

Daigle was administrator of the Rene Goupil community education centre and led a citizens' lobby group called Regroupe-Action in Montreal's Saint-Michel neighbourhood in the mid-1980s. She was first elected to council in the 1986 municipal election, centering her campaign around local opposition to the Miron Quarry urban landfill site. The MCM won a landslide majority in this election, and Daigle served as a backbench supporter of Jean Doré's administration. In 1988, she has named as vice-chair of Montreal's community development committee.

She was re-elected in the 1990 election and served a second four-year term. She was defeated in 1994, amidst a swing away from her party.

== Electoral record ==
1994 Montreal municipal election: Councillor, Jean-Rivard
Party	Candidate	Votes	%
Vision Montreal	Daniel Boucher	1,954	46.85
Montreal Citizens' Movement	Micheline Daigle (incumbent)	1,338	32.08
Montrealers' Party	Antoinette Corrado	672	16.11
Democratic Coalition–Ecology Montreal	Pietro Bozzo	207	4.96
Total valid votes		4,171	100
Source: Official Results, City of Montreal

1990 Montreal municipal election: Councillor, Jean-Rivard
Party	Candidate	Votes	%
Montreal Citizens' Movement	Micheline Daigle (incumbent)	1,557	49.18
Civic Party of Montreal	Raymond Rail	950	30.01
Municipal Party	Antoinetta A. Acierno	575	18.16
Ecology Montreal	Elizabeth Tasnady	84	2.65
Total valid votes		3,166	100
Source: Election results, 1833-2005 (in French), City of Montreal.

1986 Montreal municipal election: Councillor, Jean-Rivard
Party	Candidate	Votes	%
Montreal Citizens' Movement	Micheline Daigle	2,476	67.78
Civic Party of Montreal	Raymonde Filion	1,177	32.22
Total valid votes		3,653	100
Source: Election results, 1833-2005 (in French), City of Montreal.
