= Nicole Boudreau (Montreal politician) =

Montreal City Councillor

Nicole Boudreau is a former politician in Montreal, Quebec, Canada. She served on the Montreal city council from 1986 to 1994, representing Longue-Pointe as a member of the governing Montreal Citizens' Movement (MCM).

She is not to be confused with a different Nicole Boudreau who led the Saint-Jean-Baptiste Society of Montreal from 1986 to 1989.

== Early life ==
Boudreau worked as a medical secretary before her election to council. She also helped to form a CLSC (centre local de services communautaires) in Mercier-Est and served on its board of directors.

== City councillor ==
Boudreau first ran for city council in the 1982 municipal election and lost to Civic Party incumbent Luc Larivée. She ran again in 1986 and this time defeated Larivée by a significant margin. Boudreau was forty-four years old at the time her election and, in a post-campaign interview, said that she would work for increased port facilities and green space along Montreal's land border with the St. Lawrence River. The MCM won a landslide majority in this election, and Boudreau served as a backbench supporter of Jean Doré's administration.

Boudreau was re-elected in the 1990 municipal election, in which the MCM won a second consecutive majority. In 1991, she was one of twelve MCM councillors who announced their support for a group calling for a referendum on Quebec sovereignty.

Boudreau was defeated by Vision Montreal candidate Claire St-Arnaud in the 1994 municipal election. She attempted to return to council in 1998, but was not successful.

== Electoral record ==
1998 Montreal municipal election: Councillor, Longue-Pointe
Party	Candidate	Votes	%
Vision Montreal	Claire St-Arnaud (incumbent)	2,446	39.97
New Montreal	Martin Dumont	2,177	35.58
Montreal Citizens' Movement	Nicole Boudreau	975	15.93
Team Montreal	Jean-Jacques Viger	521	8.51
Total valid votes		6,119	100
Source: Election results, 1833-2005 (in French), City of Montreal.

1994 Montreal municipal election: Councillor, Longue-Pointe
Party	Candidate	Votes	%
Vision Montreal	Claire St-Arnaud	2,482	47.93
Montreal Citizens' Movement	Nicole Boudreau (incumbent)	1,967	37.99
Montrealers' Party	Ronald Gosselin	507	9.79
Democratic Coalition–Ecology Montreal	Jacynthe Simard	222	4.29
Total valid votes		5,178	100
Source: Official Results, City of Montreal

1990 Montreal municipal election: Councillor, Longue-Pointe
Party	Candidate	Votes	%
Montreal Citizens' Movement	Nicole Boudreau (incumbent)	2,738	65.80
Civic Party of Montreal	Marius Minier	816	19.61
Municipal Party	Michel Berthiaume	456	10.96
Ecology Montreal	Shashi Roeder	151	3.63
Total valid votes		4,161	100
Source: Election results, 1833-2005 (in French), City of Montreal.

1986 Montreal municipal election: Councillor, Longue-Pointe
Party	Candidate	Votes	%
Montreal Citizens' Movement	Nicole Boudreau	4,260	69.40
Civic Party of Montreal	Luc Larivée (incumbent)	1,878	30.60
Total valid votes		6,138	100
Source: Election results, 1833-2005 (in French), City of Montreal.

1982 Montreal municipal election: Councillor, Longue-Pointe
Party	Candidate	Votes	%
Civic Party of Montreal	Luc Larivée (incumbent)	3,463	51.27
Montreal Citizens' Movement	Nicole Boudreau	2,793	41.35
Municipal Action Group	Nola Poirier	498	7.37
Total valid votes		6,754	100
Source: Election results, 1833-2005 (in French), City of Montreal.
