= Réal Charest =

Réal Charest is a politician in Montreal, Quebec, Canada. He served on the Montreal city council from 1986 to 1994 as a member of the Montreal Citizens' Movement (MCM).

== Early life and career ==
Charest is a life insurance underwriter in private life. He has also served as a caisse populaire administrator, the vice-president of a mental-illness research foundation, and an administrator of a seniors' residence.

He was initially a prominent supporter of Jean Drapeau's Civic Party of Montreal, serving as chief organizer for its candidate in the Marie-Victorin ward for two elections during Drapeau's tenure as mayor. His decision to leave the Civic Party in 1986 and join the MCM came as a surprise to many. Charest has said that Drapeau "didn't say a word for eight to 10 seconds on the phone when I told him," adding, "and that's something, coming from the mayor."

== City councillor ==
Charest was elected for the Marie-Victorin ward in the 1986 municipal election, in which the MCM won a landslide victory. He was re-elected to a second term in the 1990 municipal election, which the MCM also won. During his time on council, he served as a backbench supporter of Jean Doré's administration. He did not seek re-election in 1994.

In 1991, Charest was one of twelve MCM councillors to align with the group Mouvement Québec, which called for a referendum on Quebec sovereignty.

Charest sought to return to council in a 2006 by-election in Marie-Victorin, running as a Vision Montreal candidate. He finished third against Carle Bernier-Genest of the Montreal Island Citizens Union (MICU).

== Electoral record ==
Montreal municipal by-election, 24 September 2006: Councillor, Marie-Victorin
Party	Candidate	Votes	%
Montreal Island Citizens Union	Carle Bernier-Genest	2,035	38.58
Projet Montréal	Kettly Beauregard	1,704	32.30
Vision Montreal	Réal Charest	1,220	23.13
Independent	Nicole Thibault	316	5.99
Total valid votes		5,275	100
Source: Official Results (in French), City of Montreal.

1990 Montreal municipal election: Councillor, Marie-Victorin
Party	Candidate	Votes	%
Montreal Citizens' Movement	Réal Charest (incumbent)	2,877	50.08
Civic Party of Montreal	Paul L'Abbee	1,820	31.68
Municipal Party	Diane Phaneuf	762	13.26
Ecology Montreal	Anna Daugulis	286	4.98
Total valid votes		5,745	100
Source: Election results, 1833-2005 (in French), City of Montreal.

1986 Montreal municipal election: Councillor, Marie-Victorin
Party	Candidate	Votes	%
Montreal Citizens' Movement	Réal Charest	4,524	61.10
Civic Party of Montreal	François Delorme	2,880	38.90
Total valid votes		7,404	100
Source: Election results, 1833-2005 (in French), City of Montreal.
