= Paolo Tamburello =

Paolo V. Tamburello is a politician in Montreal, Quebec, Canada. He served on the Montreal city council from 1994 to 2005 and was a member of the Montreal executive committee under Pierre Bourque.

== City councillor ==
Tamburello was a travel agent before entering political life. He was a co-ordinator for Mayor Jean Doré's Montreal Citizens' Movement (MCM) in the Saint-Michel in the early 1990s, before leaving the party over its failure to close the Miron quarry urban landfill site. In the 1994 municipal election, he was elected to council for the Saint-Michel division as a member of Pierre Bourque's Vision Montreal (VM). Bourque's party won a majority on council, and Tamburello initially served as backbench supporter of the administration.

Tamburello supported Bourque during Vision Montreal's 1997 inter-party crisis and was named as an associate member of the executive committee on February 5, 1997. Later in the same month, he was appointed to the city's environment committee. He was re-elected in the 1998 election and was promoted to full executive committee membership on November 12, 1998, with responsibility for parks, gardens, and greenspace. In late 1999, he announced that Montreal would provide one million dollars in services to the Mosaiculture International Montreal 2000's horticultural event.

Tamburello was re-elected to council in the 2001 municipal election, in which Vision Montreal was defeated by Gérald Tremblay's Montreal Island Citizens Union (MICU). Following the election, he left the executive committee and served as an opposition member. By virtue of holding his council seat, he also received a position on the newly formed Villeray—Saint-Michel—Parc-Extension borough council, and was chosen as its first chair. In 2003, his designation was upgraded to borough mayor.

In late December 2004, Tamburello left Vision Montreal to sit as an independent. He joined MICU on March 2, 2005. He sought re-election as borough mayor of Villeray—Saint-Michel—Parc-Extension in the 2005 municipal election, but was defeated by Vision Montreal's Anie Samson.

Tamburello remained active with Tremblay's party (renamed as Union Montreal) after the 2005 election. In 2007, he was elected to the party's executive as a vice-president representing the city's eastern region.

In 2009, the Montreal Gazette reported that Tamburello and city councillor Marcel Tremblay, the mayor's brother, "were reported to have spoken on behalf of" developer Michael Rosenberg, a contributor to Union Montreal, to Canadian prime minister's press secretary Dimitri Soudas. Tamburello and Tremblay said that they were not seeking to intervene on behalf of Rosenberg, but were curious about the status of a file involving the developer. Soudas was investigated by the federal ethics commissioner for his handling of the matter and "was cleared of wrongdoing in June 2008."

== Provincial politics ==
Tamburello ran for the Action démocratique du Québec (ADQ) party in the 2003 provincial election.

== Electoral record ==
2005 Montreal municipal election: Borough Mayor, Villeray–Saint-Michel–Parc-Extension
Party	Candidate	Votes	%
Vision Montreal	Anie Samson	13,109	45.24
Montreal Island Citizens Union	Paolo Tamburello (incumbent)	11,122	38.38
Projet Montréal	Jose Luis Bolanos	3,616	12.48
Independent	Muhammad Haseen	1,128	3.89
Total valid votes		28,975	100
Source: City of Montreal official results (in French), City of Montreal.

2001 Montreal municipal election: Councillor, Saint-Michel
Party	Candidate	Votes	%
Vision Montreal	Paolo Tamburello (incumbent)	5,911	65.24
Montreal Island Citizens Union	Nancy Forlini	2,684	29.62
White Elephant Party	Thérèse Beaulieu	466	5.14
Total valid votes		9,061	100
Source: Election results, 1833-2005 (in French), City of Montreal.

1998 Montreal municipal election: Councillor, Saint-Michel
Party	Candidate	Votes	%
Vision Montreal	Paolo Tamburello (incumbent)	3,308	58.02
Team Montreal	Pasquale Compierchio	1,015	17.80
New Montreal	Myrlande Pierre	856	15.01
Montreal Citizens' Movement	Valentino Nelson	417	7.31
Independent	Marcel Firmin	105	1.84
Total valid votes		5,701	100
Source: Official Results, City of Montreal

1994 Montreal municipal election: Councillor, Saint-Michel
Party	Candidate	Votes	%
Vision Montreal	Paolo Tamburello	2,403	46.81
Montrealers' Party	Pasquale Compierchio (incumbent)	1,711	33.33
Montreal Citizens' Movement	Donato Caivano	737	14.36
Democratic Coalition–Ecology Montreal	Michele A. Benigno	283	5.51
Total valid votes		5,134	100
Source: Official Results, City of Montreal
