= Claire St-Arnaud =

Canadian politician

Montreal City Councillor for Longue-Pointe / Maisonneuve–Longue-Pointe
- In office 1994–2009
- Preceded by: Nicole Boudreau
- Succeeded by: Louise Harel

Leader of the Official Opposition on Montreal City Council (equivalent of House Leader)
- In office 2003 or earlier – 2008
- Succeeded by: Anie Samson

Chair of the Vision Montreal Caucus
- In office 2003 or earlier – January 2006
- Preceded by: Luc Larivée (until 2002)
- Succeeded by: François Purcell
- In office September 2007 – November 2008
- Preceded by: François Purcell
- Succeeded by: Gaëtan Primeau

Chair of Montreal Urban Community's Public Security Committee
- In office 1997–2001
- Preceded by: Kettly Beauregard
- Succeeded by: position eliminated

Claire St-Arnaud is a politician in Montreal, Quebec, Canada. She served on the Montreal city council from 1994 to 2009, representing the east-end division of Longue-Pointe. St-Arnaud was a member of Vision Montreal until resigning to sit as an independent in 2008.

== City councillor ==
First term

St-Arnaud was first elected to city council in the 1994 municipal election, defeating incumbent councillor Nicole Boudreau of the Montreal Citizens' Movement (MCM). Vision Montreal won a majority government in this election under Pierre Bourque's leadership, and St-Arnaud served as a supporter of the administration. She was appointed as an assistant to Montreal executive committee chairman Noushig Eloyan and was given responsibility for community groups and for sports and recreation. In 1996, she took part in difficult negotiations with municipal day camps and oversaw fee increases for children's hockey, baseball, and soccer.

St-Arnaud became chair of the Montreal Urban Community's public security committee in February 1997. Soon after her appointment, she oversaw the adoption of a community policing initiative proposed by police chief Jacques Duchesneau. In 1998, she rejected a proposal by fellow Montreal councillor Marvin Rotrand for public consultation in the selection of the urban community's next chief.

She circulated a letter to other councillors in 1996, informing them that Montreal had a $125,000 surplus and encouraging them to apply for youth and anti-poverty funding. Montreal Gazette, while endorsing the funding initiatives, criticized St-Arnaud for only sending the letter to Vision Montreal councillors and not to members of the opposition. St-Arnaud responded that this had been an innocent mistake.

St-Arnaud was an ally of Mayor Bourque during Vision Montreal's internal divisions in the late 1990s. In March 1998, she joined Bourque in delivering a major statement on Montreal's medical health needs at a public hearing of the Montreal regional health board.

Second term

St-Arnaud was re-elected in the 1998 municipal election, in which Vision Montreal won a second consecutive majority. She continued to serve as chair of the urban community's public security committee. In 2000, Gazette journalist Henry Aubin wrote a strongly critical editorial describing the committee as "mild and accommodating" to the police and describing St-Arnaud as "completely unknown to the public whom she theoretically represents." (Not long after this editorial was published, a large-scale riot took place in downtown Montreal during a vigil against police brutality. St-Arnaud asked the police for a full report on the matter.)

St-Arnaud also chaired a municipal committee on prostitution. In March 2000, she argued that repressive approaches such as arrests and prosecutions had not been successful and announced a pilot project in two districts aimed at getting prostitutes off the streets through social work. The project was cancelled following vociferous opposition from local residents, who feared it would result in increased prostitution and crime.

Third and fourth terms

St-Arnaud was elected to a third term in the 2001 municipal election, in which Vision Montreal was defeated by Gérald Tremblay's Montreal Island Citizens Union (MICU). During the term that followed, she served as both Vision Montreal council chair and leader of the official opposition party on city council (an equivalent position to that of House Leader in the House of Commons of Canada).

She was again returned for the renamed division of Maisonneuve–Longue-Pointe in the 2005 election, which was also won by MICU. She remained leader of the opposition party on council but was for a time replaced as caucus chair by François Purcell. Purcell resigned in 2007, and St-Arnaud resumed the office as his successor. She continued to serve in both capacities until November 28, 2008, when she resigned from Vision Montreal to sit as an independent.

St-Arnaud joined Tremblay's party, by now renamed as Union Montreal, in June 2009 and ran under its banner for borough mayor of Mercier–Hochelaga-Maisonneuve in the 2009 municipal election. She finished third against Vision candidate Réal Ménard.

From 2001 to 2009, St-Arnaud served on the Mercier–Hochelaga-Maisonneuve borough council by virtue of holding her seat on city council.

== Electoral record ==
2009 Montreal municipal election: Borough Mayor, Mercier–Hochelaga-Maisonneuve
Party	Candidate	Votes	%
Vision Montreal	Réal Ménard	20,103	52.53
Projet Montréal	Ann Julie Fortier	9,640	25.19
Union Montreal	Claire St-Arnaud	8,528	22.28
Total valid votes		38,271	100
Source: Municipal Election Results, 2009, City of Montreal.

2005 Montreal municipal election: Councillor, Maisonneuve–Longue-Pointe
Party	Candidate	Votes	%
Vision Montreal	Claire St-Arnaud (incumbent)	3,962	51.43
Montreal Island Citizens Union	Monique Comtois-Blanchet	2,715	35.24
Projet Montréal	Luce Beaulieu	1,027	13.33
Total valid votes		7,704	100
Source: Election results, 1833-2005 (in French), City of Montreal.

2001 Montreal municipal election: Councillor, Longue-Pointe
Party	Candidate	Votes	%
Vision Montreal	Claire St-Arnaud (incumbent)	5,474	59.24
Montreal Island Citizens Union	Martin Dumont	3,767	40.76
Total valid votes		9,241	100
Source: Election results, 1833-2005 (in French), City of Montreal.

1998 Montreal municipal election: Councillor, Longue-Pointe
Party	Candidate	Votes	%
Vision Montreal	Claire St-Arnaud (incumbent)	2,446	39.97
New Montreal	Martin Dumont	2,177	35.58
Montreal Citizens' Movement	Nicole Boudreau	975	15.93
Team Montreal	Jean-Jacques Viger	521	8.51
Total valid votes		6,119	100
Source: Election results, 1833-2005 (in French), City of Montreal.

1994 Montreal municipal election: Councillor, Longue-Pointe
Party	Candidate	Votes	%
Vision Montreal	Claire St-Arnaud	2,482	47.93
Montreal Citizens' Movement	Nicole Boudreau (incumbent)	1,967	37.99
Montrealers' Party	Ronald Gosselin	507	9.79
Democratic Coalition–Ecology Montreal	Jacynthe Simard	222	4.29
Total valid votes		5,178	100
Source: Official Results, City of Montreal
