= Jacques Charbonneau =

Canadian politician

Jacques Charbonneau is a former politician in the Canadian province of Quebec. He served on the Montreal city council from 1986 to 2001, originally as a member of the Montreal Citizens' Movement (MCM) and later as a member of Vision Montreal (VM).

== Private career ==
Charbonneau was a communications advisor for Hôpital Notre-Dame in private life, a position that he retained after his election to city council. In the 1980s, he helped organize meetings and conferences on care for the disabled.

== City councillor ==
=== Montreal Citizens' Movement ===
Charbonneau was first elected to city council in the 1986 municipal election for the east-end division of Louis-Riel as a candidate of the Montreal Citizens' Movement, which won the election with a landslide majority. Forty-eight years old at the time, he subsequently served as a backbench supporter of Mayor Jean Doré's administration. He was re-elected in the 1990 municipal election, in which Doré and the MCM won a second consecutive mandate.

In June 1991, Charbonneau announced his support for Mouvement Québec, a Quebec sovereigntist group that sought to have a referendum within a year on the future of Quebec's status in Canada.

Charbonneau openly criticized Doré's administration in mid-1992, saying that it needed to improve its record on neighbourhood services. The following year, he joined with other MCM dissidents in protesting the mayor's decision for Montreal to lease space in the World Trade Center. He finally resigned from the party on October 18, 1993, to sit as an independent.

During his second term on council, Charbonneau was a member of the Montreal Urban Community's urban planning committee.

=== Vision Montreal ===
After leaving the MCM, Charbonneau took part in behind-the-scenes negotiations that led to the launch of Vision Montreal, a new municipal party led by Pierre Bourque. He was re-elected under the party's banner in the 1994 municipal election, in which Bourque was elected mayor and Vision Montreal won a council majority. Charbonneau was appointed to the Montreal Urban Community's environmental committee in early 1997 and also served on its executive. In April 1997, he spoke against plans to construct a giant waste incinerator in Montreal's east end.

Charbonneau criticized Bourque's administration in June 1997, saying that it had neglected its promise to protect a group of houses that were sinking into the ground in the city's east end. He later resigned from VM to sit as an independent on July 18, 1997, in protest against Bourque's decision to sell the Hippodrome de Montréal to the provincial government.

After serving for a year as an independent, Charbonneau rejoined Vision Montreal on August 10, 1998. Helen Fotopulos, an opposition councillor, remarked that the move had been "in the works" for some time, as evidenced by Charbonneau's record of voting with the mayor. He was re-elected in the 1998 municipal election and served for three more years as a pro-administration backbencher. He did not seek re-election in 2001, after Vision Montreal denied him re-nomination.

== Electoral record ==
1998 Montreal municipal election: Councillor, Louis-Riel division
| Party | Candidate | Votes | % |
|---|---|---|---|
| Vision Montreal | (x)Jacques Charbonneau | 4,077 | 54.09 |
| New Montreal | Bernard Lauzon | 1,890 | 25.08 |
| Montreal Citizens' Movement | Daniel Thérien | 790 | 10.48 |
| Team Montreal | Nathalie Langlois | 698 | 9.26 |
| Montreal 2000 | David Bédard | 82 | 1.09 |
| Total valid votes | | 7,537 | 100.00 |
Source: Official Results, City of Montreal.

1994 Montreal municipal election: Councillor, Louis-Riel division
| Party | Candidate | Votes | % |
|---|---|---|---|
| Vision Montreal | (x)Jacques Charbonneau | 4,354 | 61.80 |
| Montreal Citizens' Movement | Yves Bougie | 1,814 | 25.75 |
| Montrealers' Party | Fabienne Bouchard | 740 | 10.50 |
| Democratic Coalition–Ecology Montreal | Phillip Chee | 137 | 1.94 |
| Total valid votes | | 7,045 | 100 |
Source: Official results, City of Montreal.

1990 Montreal municipal election: Councillor, Louis-Riel
| Party | Candidate | Votes | % |
|---|---|---|---|
| Montreal Citizens' Movement | Jacques Charbonneau (incumbent) | 3,285 | 65.74 |
| Civic Party of Montreal | André Belanger | 886 | 17.73 |
| Municipal Party | Huguette Leboeuf | 826 | 16.53 |
| Total valid votes | | 4,997 | 100 |
Source: Election results, 1833-2005 (in French), City of Montreal.

1986 Montreal municipal election: Councillor, Louis Riel
| Party | Candidate | Votes | % |
|---|---|---|---|
| Montreal Citizens' Movement | Jacques Charbonneau | 4,506 | 60.66 |
| Civic Party of Montreal | Carmen G. Millette (incumbent) | 2,922 | 39.34 |
| Total valid votes | | 7,428 | 100 |
Source: Election results, 1833-2005 (in French), City of Montreal.
