= Ginette L'Heureux =

Ginette L'Heureux is an administrator and former politician in Montreal, Quebec, Canada. She was a member of the Montreal city council from 1986 to 1994, serving as a member of the Montreal Citizens' Movement (MCM) party.

== Early life and career ==
L'Heureux worked as an aide to Parti Québécois (PQ) legislator Louise Harel before her own election and supported Pauline Marois's first bid for the PQ leadership in 1985. She was thirty-seven years old in late 1986 and administered a project to reintegrate women into the workforce.

== Municipal councillor ==
L'Heureux was first elected to the Montreal city council in the 1986 municipal election, defeating a Civic Party candidate in the east-end Maissoneuve ward. The MCM won a landslide majority in this election, and L'Heureux was appointed by new mayor Jean Doré as his assistant on international affairs. She was also appointed to the board of directors of the Montreal Urban Community Transit Corp. (MUCTC).

L'Heureux took part in a delegation to China in 1987 with Mayor Doré and other officials. In July 1989, however, she announced that Montreal would discontinue several planned political exchanges with Shanghai to protest China's campaign against political dissidents following the Tiananmen Square protests of 1989. The two cities had signed a friendship agreement four years earlier. L'Heureux later attended a meeting of francophone mayors in Gabon and led a city delegation to Russia.

She was re-elected in the 1990 municipal election, in which the MCM won a second consecutive majority. She continued to serve as Montreal's international affairs representative and as a MUCTC director after the election. In September 1992, she took part in a municipal delegation to Moscow.

L'Heureux was named as interim chair of the MUCTC in August 1994, when Robert Perreault resigned to run for provincial office. The following month, she announced that more than 1,600 advertising spaces on buses and trains had been made available for anti-violence advertising. She did not seek re-election in the 1994 municipal election and was replaced as MUCTC chair by Yves Ryan in November 1994.

== Administrator ==
L'Heureux was later appointed as a spokesperson for the Quebec Human Rights Commission. In 2007, she issued an opinion that a Parti Québécois proposal requiring all newcomers to Quebec to prove their knowledge of French before being granted citizenship was discriminatory.

== Electoral record ==
1990 Montreal municipal election: Councillor, Maisonneuve
Party	Candidate	Votes	%
Montreal Citizens' Movement	Ginette L'Heureux (incumbent)	2,065	51.06
Civic Party of Montreal	Jean-Guy Beland	1,095	27.08
Municipal Party	Marcel Pitre	586	14.49
Democratic Coalition	Robert Aubin	168	4.15
White Elephant Party	Marc Lavigne	130	3.21
Total valid votes		4,044	100
Source: Election results, 1833-2005 (in French), City of Montreal.

1986 Montreal municipal election: Councillor, Maisonneuve
Party	Candidate	Votes	%
Montreal Citizens' Movement	Ginette L'Heureux	3,702	65.98
Civic Party of Montreal	Roger Gallagher	1,909	34.02
Total valid votes		5,611	100
Source: Election results, 1833-2005 (in French), City of Montreal.
