= Pasquale Compierchio =

Pasqaule Compierchio is a former politician in Montreal, Quebec, Canada. He served on the Montreal city council from 1990 to 1994.

Compierchio was elected to council in the 1990 municipal election as a candidate of the Civic Party in Saint-Michel. The governing Montreal Citizens' Movement won this election in a landslide, and the opposition parties won only a handful of seats between them. Compierchio was the only Civic Party candidate elected; local anger over the government's failure to close the Miron Quarry urban landfill site was a factor in the result.

There was significant realignment in Montreal's opposition parties over the next four years, and several councillors joined and left the Civic Party at different times. By early 1994, Compierchio was once again its only council member. He finally quit the party to sit as an independent on March 23, 1994, describing the party's mayoral nominee Clement Bluteau as a "big zero" and comparing him to fascist dictator Benito Mussolini. The party itself dissolved a few months thereafter.

Compierchio later aligned himself with Claude Beauchamp's short-lived Action Montreal party. This group was never officially recognized on council, and Compierchio technically remained an independent representative. After Action Montreal dissolved, Compierchio ultimately joined the Montrealers' Party and ran under its banner in the 1994 election. He lost to Paolo Tamburello of Vision Montreal.

Compierchio sought to return to council in 1998 as a candidate of Jean Doré Team Montreal. He was defeated.

== Electoral record ==
1998 Montreal municipal election: Councillor, Saint-Michel
Party	Candidate	Votes	%
Vision Montreal	Paolo Tamburello (incumbent)	3,308	58.02
Team Montreal	Pasquale Compierchio	1,015	17.80
New Montreal	Myrlande Pierre	856	15.01
Montreal Citizens' Movement	Valentino Nelson	417	7.31
Independent	Marcel Firmin	105	1.84
Total valid votes		5,701	100
Source: Official Results, City of Montreal

1994 Montreal municipal election: Councillor, Saint-Michel
Party	Candidate	Votes	%
Vision Montreal	Paolo Tamburello	2,403	46.81
Montrealers' Party	Pasquale Compierchio (incumbent)	1,711	33.33
Montreal Citizens' Movement	Donato Caivano	737	14.36
Democratic Coalition–Ecology Montreal	Michele A. Benigno	283	5.51
Total valid votes		5,134	100
Source: Official Results, City of Montreal

1990 Montreal municipal election: Councillor, Saint-Michel
Party	Candidate	Votes	%
Civic Party of Montreal	Pasquale Compierchio	1,783	40.06
Montreal Citizens' Movement	Giovanni Ialenti (incumbent)	1,448	32.53
Municipal Party	Jacques Pelletier	924	20.76
Independent	Franco Perrusi	149	3.35
White Elephant Party	Danielle Paradis	93	2.09
Democratic Coalition	Sean Berry	54	1.21
Total valid votes		4,451	100
Source: Election results, 1833-2005 (in French), City of Montreal.
