= Kettly Beauregard =

Canadian politician

Montreal City Councillor for Marie-Victorin
- In office 1994–2001
- Preceded by: Réal Charest
- Succeeded by: Pierre Bourque

Associate Member of the Montreal Executive Committee responsible for Cultural Relations
- In office 1997–2001
- Succeeded by: Helen Fotopulos

Chair of the Montreal Urban Community's Public Security Committee
- In office 1994–1997
- Preceded by: Peter Yeomans
- Succeeded by: Claire St-Arnaud

Kettly Beauregard is a politician in Montreal, Quebec, Canada. She served on the Montreal city council from 1994 to 2001, representing Marie-Victorin as a member of Vision Montreal. She has also sought election to the House of Commons of Canada and the National Assembly of Quebec. Beauregard was the first black city councillor in Montreal's history.

== Early life and career ==
Beauregard was born to a middle class family in Haiti and was raised in the affluent suburban community of Pétion-Ville. She moved to Canada in 1972 and later received a degree in political science from the Université du Québec à Montréal (1981). From 1990 to 1994, she was the leader of Service d'aide communautaire, providing social services in the Côte-des-Neiges area.

== City councillor ==
First term

Beauregard was first elected to city council in the 1994 municipal election, as the co-listed candidate with Vision Montreal party leader Pierre Bourque in Marie-Victorin. As Bourque was elected in the mayoral contest, she assumed the council seat. A few days after her election, she was quoted as saying, "I was accepted in a district that is 80 per cent Québécois. By doing that, Quebec society made a statement. People accepted me to be their spokesman. I'm very proud of that. But work is needed on both sides. Cultural communities also have to try to get to know the other side." She added that Montreal police officers needed to become more aware of cultural communities in the city and to reject negative cultural stereotypes.

Vision Montreal won a majority government in this election, and Beauregard initially served as a backbench supporter of the Bourque administration on council. In late November 1994, she was appointed to chair the Montreal Urban Community's public security committee, which was responsible for overseeing police services. She indicated that one of her priorities would be improving relations between the police and cultural communities, saying that more understanding was needed on both sides. Police chief Jacques Duchesneau said he was pleased with Beauregard's appointment.

In April 1995, Beauregard criticized a group of Montreal officers for having taken pictures of nine black students from the Little Burgundy neighbourhood for use in police lineups without having sought parental permission. She added, however, that the action was not racist but instead resulted from a cultural misunderstanding. The latter statement was criticized by some in Montreal's black community.

Beauregard supported Duchesneau's plan to introduce community policing to Montreal. In 1996, she disagreed with fellow councillor Marvin Rotrand's charge that Montreal police were resorting too frequently to the use of pepper spray.

In November 1996, Beauregard argued that responsibility for complaints about racism in the police force should be taken from the Comité de déontologie policière (Quebec Police Ethics Committee) and given to police station directors. She argued that the committee was being burdened with too many minor complaints.

Beauregard was appointed as an associate member of the Montreal executive committee (i.e., the municipal cabinet) on February 6, 1997, with responsibility for cultural relations. At the same time, she was appointed to Montreal's committees on urban planning and finance & economic development. She stood down as chair of the public security committee on February 19, 1997.

During Vision Montreal's internal party crisis of 1997, Beauregard was known as a staunch Bourque loyalist.

Second term

Beauregard was re-elected in the 1998 municipal election, once again running as a co-listed candidate with Bourque, who was elected to a second term as mayor. She continued to serve as an associate member of the executive committee with responsibility for cultural relations.

In March 2000, Beauregard and fellow Vision councillor Sonya Biddle accompanied Bourque on a somewhat controversial trip to Trinidad and Tobago. City officials contended that the trip was intended as research on the organization of summer carnivals, while critics alleged it was simply a junket undertaken for political purposes.

Beauregard ran as Bourque's co-listed candidate for a third time in the 2001 municipal election. She was once again elected, but Bourque was defeated in the mayoral contest; under municipal election rules, he received the council seat in her place. Beauregard initially accepted this decision, but she later criticized Bourque's decision to resign as opposition leader and run for the provincial Action démocratique du Québec party. In 2003, she called for the co-listing of mayoral and council candidates to be abolished. She also launched a lawsuit against Bourque, charging him with reneging on an oral contract to pay her $57,000 per year as an assistant; she lost the case in a January 2006 ruling.

== Since 2001 ==
Beauregard ran as a Parti Québécois (PQ) candidate in Bourassa-Sauvé in the 2003 Quebec provincial election and finished a distant second against Liberal Line Beauchamp.

Beauregard contested the 2005 Montreal municipal election as an independent candidate for council against Pierre Bourque; she finished third, after a campaign that she described as the nastiest of her career. She tried to return to council as a Projet Montréal candidate in a September 2006 by-election, this time finishing a close second.

In a 2010 news article, Beauregard was listed as working for a coordinating committee for Montreal's Haitian community.

Beauregard ran for the House of Commons of Canada in the 2011 federal election as a candidate of the Liberal Party of Canada in Rosemont—La Petite-Patrie. During this election, she informed a surprised interviewer that she was still a member of the Parti Québécois at the provincial level; she explained that not all PQ members are supporters of Quebec separatism. On election day, she finished third against New Democratic Party candidate Alexandre Boulerice.

== Electoral record ==
Federal

2011 Canadian federal election: Rosemont—La Petite-Patrie
Party	Candidate	Votes	%	±%	Expenditures
New Democratic	Alexandre Boulerice	27,484	51.00		$34,354
Bloc Québécois	Bernard Bigras (incumbent)	17,702	32.84		$75,138
Liberal	Kettly Beauregard	4,920	9.13		$11,976
Conservative	Sébastien Forté	2,328	4.32		$5,770
Green	Sameer Muldeen	899	1.67		none listed
Rhinoceros	Jean-Patrick Berthiaume	417	0.77		$450
Marxist–Leninist	Stéphane Chénier	140	0.26		none listed
Total valid votes		53,890	100.00		
Total rejected ballots		589			
Turnout		54,479	66.47		
Electors on the lists		81,961			
Source: Official Results, Elections Canada and Financial Returns, Elections Canada.

Provincial

2003 Quebec general election: Bourassa-Sauvé
Party	Candidate	Votes	%	±%
Liberal	Line Beauchamp (incumbent)	20,175	61.07	
Parti Québécois	Kettly Beauregard	8,243	24.95	
Action démocratique	Michelle Allaire	3,771	11.42	
Green	Francis Mallette	327	0.99	
Communist	Sylvain Archambault	261	0.79	
Christian Democracy	Denis Gagné	119	0.36	
Marxist–Leninist	Claude Brunelle	94	0.28	
Equality	Boris Mospan	44	0.13	
Total valid votes		33,034	100.00	
Total rejected ballots		573		
Turnout		33,607	64.22	
Electors		52,332		
Source: Official Results, Le Directeur général des élections du Québec.

Municipal

Montreal municipal by-election, 24 September 2006: Councillor, Marie-Victorin
Party	Candidate	Votes	%
Montreal Island Citizens Union	Carle Bernier-Genest	2,035	38.58
Projet Montréal	Kettly Beauregard	1,704	32.30
Vision Montreal	Réal Charest	1,220	23.13
Independent	Nicole Thibault	316	5.99
Total valid votes		5,275	100
Source: Official Results (in French), City of Montreal.

2005 Montreal municipal election: Councillor, Marie-Victorin
Party	Candidate	Votes	%
Vision Montreal	Nicole Thibault co-listed with Pierre Bourque (incumbent)	3,405	38.10
Montreal Island Citizens Union	Carle Bernier-Genest	3,105	34.74
Independent	Kettly Beauregard	1,755	19.64
Projet Montréal	Gilles Lortie	672	7.52
Total valid votes		8,937	100
Source: Election results, 1833-2005 (in French), City of Montreal.

2001 Montreal municipal election: Councillor, Marie-Victorin
Party	Candidate	Votes	%
Vision Montreal	Kettly Beauregard (incumbent) co-listed with Pierre Bourque	7,077	64.26
Montreal Island Citizens Union	Hugo Morissette	3,587	32.57
White Elephant Party	Gilles Bédard	349	3.17
Total valid votes		11,013	100
Source: Election results, 1833-2005 (in French), City of Montreal.

1998 Montreal municipal election: Councillor, Marie-Victorin
Party	Candidate	Votes	%
Vision Montreal	Kettly Beauregard (incumbent) co-listed with Pierre Bourque	3,778	46.63
New Montreal	André Meunier	2,754	33.99
Montreal Citizens' Movement	Anne Baribeau	799	9.86
Team Montreal	Manon Tanguay	680	8.39
Montreal 2000	Claude Boismenu	91	1.12
Total valid votes		8,102	100
Source: Election results, 1833-2005 (in French), City of Montreal.

1994 Montreal municipal election: Councillor, Marie-Victorin
Party	Candidate	Votes	%
Vision Montreal	Kettly Beauregard co-listed with Pierre Bourque	4,122	55.42
Montreal Citizens' Movement	Pierre Boisseau	2,015	27.09
Montrealers' Party	Richard Guertin	1,091	14.67
Democratic Coalition–Ecology Montreal	Angel Martinez	210	2.82
Total valid votes		7,438	100
Source: Official Results, City of Montreal
