= Green Party of Canada candidates in the 1984 Canadian federal election =

The Green Party of Canada fielded sixty candidates in the 1984 Canadian federal election, none of whom were elected. This was the first election that the Green Party contested. Some of the party's candidates have their own biography pages; information about others may be found here.

This page is not yet complete.

== Quebec ==
=== Laurier: Robert Silverman ===
Robert Silverman is a veteran political activist in Montreal. Sometimes known as "Bicycle Bob," he has taken part in several campaigns supporting bicycle use over automobiles. He was a Green Party candidate in 1984 and ran for Montréal Écologique in the 1990 municipal election; in the latter campaign, he led a march to city hall supporting more bicycle lanes and better public transit. Silverman is also a member of Independent Jewish Voices (Canada) and has campaigned in support of Palestinian rights.

Electoral record
Election	Division	Party	Votes	%	Place	Winner
1984 federal	Laurier	Green	751	2.79	6/9	David Berger, Liberal
1990 municipal	Montreal City Council, Laurier ward	Ecology Montreal	380	9.15	4/6	Robert Perreault, Montreal Citizens' Movement
