= 1990 Montreal municipal election =

Election in Quebec, Canada

← 1986	November 5, 1990	1994 →

51 seats in Montreal City Council 26 seats needed for a majority
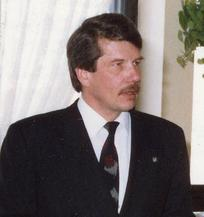
	First party	Second party
Leader	Jean Doré	Nicole Gagnon-Larocque
Party	Citizens' Movement	Civic Party of Montreal
Leader since	1982	1990
Last election	55 seats, 67.70%
Seats won	42	1
Seat change	▼13	Steady
Popular vote	129,209	45,221
Percentage	59.20%	20.72%
Swing	▼8.0%	▼8.64
	Third party	Fourth party
Leader	Alain André	Pierre-Yves Melançon
Party	Montreal Municipal Party	Democratic Coalition
Leader since	1987	1989
Seats won	3	3
Popular vote	22,732	10,282
Percentage	10.42%	4.71%
Mayor before election
Jean Doré
Citizens' Movement
Elected mayor
Pierre Bourque
Vision Montreal

The 1990 Montreal municipal election took place on November 4, 1990, to elect a mayor and city councillors in Montreal, Quebec, Canada. Jean Doré was elected to a second term as mayor by a significant margin.

All mayoral candidates were also permitted to run for seats on council in tandem with "co-listed candidates." In this way, all unsuccessful mayoral candidates could serve on council by assuming the seat of their co-lister (provided, of course, that the co-lister was elected).

Elections were also held in Montreal's suburban communities.

== Results (incomplete) ==
The party colours do not indicate affiliation with or resemblance to any other municipal, provincial, or federal party.

Electoral District	Position	Total valid votes	Candidates						Incumbent
Electoral District	Position	Total valid votes	Montreal Citizens' Movement	Civic Party of Montreal	Montreal Municipal Party	Democratic Coalition	Ecology Montreal	Other	Incumbent
	Mayor	218,256	Jean Doré; 129,209 (59.20%)	Nicole Gagnon-Larocque; 45,221 (20.72%)	Alain André; 22,732 (10.42%)	Pierre-Yves Melançon; 10,282 (4.71%)		Michel Bédard (White Elephant Party); 5,025 (2.30%) Michel Dugré (Ind.); 2,098 (0.96%) Patricia Métivier (Ind.); 1,858 (0.85%) Abraham Weizfeld; 1,831 (0.84%)	Jean Doré
Cartierville	City councillor	4,920	Kathleen Verdon; 1,599 (32.50%)	Sylvain Campeau; 801 (16.28%)	Pierre Gagnier; 2,359 (47.95%)	Caroline Singleton; 161 (3.27%)			Kathleen Verdon
Acadie	City councillor	5,450	Gérard Legault; 2,756 (50.57%)	Jack Chadirdjian; 1,829 (33.56%)	Edmond Bishara; 727 (13.34%)	Shayne Kenny; 138 (2.53%)			Gérard Legault
Ahuntsic	City councillor	6,449	Ghassan Saba; 1,778 (27.57%)	Achille Polcaro; 1,583 (24.55%)	Diane Côté-Massaro (co-listed with Alain André); 2,479 (38.44%)		Bernard Bourbonnais; 502 (7.78%)	Christian Coutu (White Elephant Party); 107 (1.66%)	Pierre Bastien
Saint-Sulpice	City councillor		Michel Benoit	Françoise Maisonneuve	Alain Trahan	Richard Cordeau			Michel Benoit
Fleury	City councillor		Pierre Lachapelle	Michel Drouin	Thomas Turp		Renée Duval		Pierre Lachapelle
Sault-au-Récollet	City councillor		Sylvie Lanthier	Angelo Ferrara	Serge Sauvageau		Eva Tasnady	David Bédard (White Elephant Party)	Serge Sauvageau
Saint-Michel	City councillor	4,451	Giovanni Ialenti; 1,448 (32.53%)	Pasquale Compierchio; 1,783 (40.06%)	Jacques Pelletier; 924 (20.76%)	Sean Berry; 54 (1.21%)		Franco Perrusi (Ind.); 149 (3.35%) Danielle Paradis (White Elephant Party); 93 (2.09%)	Giovanni Ialenti
Jean-Rivard	City councillor	3,166	Micheline Daigle; 1,557 (49.18%)	Raymond Rail; 950 (30.01%)	Antoinetta A. Acierno; 575 (18.16%)		Elizabeth Tasnady; 84 (2.65%)		Micheline Daigle
François-Perrault	City councillor	4,024	Vittorio Capparelli; 1,757 (43.66%)	Serge Bélanger; 1,125 (27.96%)	Frank Venneri; 1,142 (28.38%)				Frank Venneri
Marie-Victorin	City councillor	5,745	Réal Charest; 2,877 (50.08%)	Paul L'Abbee; 1,820 (31.68%)	Diane Phaneuf; 762 (13.26%)		Anna Daugulis; 286 (4.98%)		Réal Charest
Louis-Riel	City councillor	4,997	Jacques Charbonneau; 3,285 (65.74%)	André Belanger; 886 (17.73%)	Huguette Leboeuf; 826 (16.53%)				Jacques Charbonneau
Laurier	City councillor	4,151	Robert Perreault; 2,452 (59.07%)	Paul-Emile Patry; 559 (13.47%)	Normand Vachon; 507 (12.21%)		Robert Silverman; 380 (9.15%)	Yves Gagne (co-listed with Michel Bédard) (White Elephant Party); 169 (4.07%) Micheline Dandonneau (Ind.); 84 (2.02%)	Robert Perreault
Mile End	City councillor	4,070	John Gardiner; 1,986 (48.80%)	Glenmore T. Browne; 476 (11.70%)	Robert Stec; 566 (13.91%)	Philip Lanthier; 385 (9.46%)	Greg Tutko; 657 (16.14%)		John Gardiner
Peter-McGill	City councillor	3,267	Arnold Bennett; 1,246 (38.14%)	William Crone; 286 (8.75%)	Nick Auf der Maur; 1,564 (47.87%)			Jose di Bona (Ind.); 122 (3.73%) Pierre Corbeil (White Elephant Party); 49 (1.50%)	
Loyola	City councillor	4,324	Sharon Leslie; 1,360 (31.45%)	Andrew Barbacki; 580 (13.41%)	George Savoidakis; 1,290 (29.83%)	Jeremy Searle; 1,094 (25.30%)			Sharon Leslie
Saint-Henri	City councillor	3,759	Germaine Vaillancourt; 564 (15.00%)	Louise Brison; 283 (7.53%)	Dianne Boyer; 115 (3.06%)		Marlène Lavoie; 244 (6.49%)	Germain Prégent (Ind.); 2,553 (67.92%)	Germain Prégent
Maisonneuve	City councillor	4,044	Ginette L'Heureux; 2,065 (51.06%)	Jean-Guy Beland; 1,095 (27.08%)	Marcel Pitre; 586 (14.49%)	Robert Aubin; 168 (4.15%)		Marc Lavigne (White Elephant Party); 130 (3.21%)	Ginette L'Heureux
Longue-Pointe	City councillor	4,161	Nicole Boudreau; 2,738 (65.80%)	Marius Minier; 816 (19.61%)	Michel Berthiaume; 456 (10.96%)		Shashi Roeder; 151 (3.63%)		Nicole Boudreau
Rivière-des-Prairies	City councillor	5,677	Fiorino Bianco; 2,436 (42.91%)	Nick Colombo; 477 (8.40%)	Pierre Coutu; 260 (4.58%)	Pierre Boucher; 147 (2.59%)		Gilles Berthiaume (Ind.); 2,222 (39.14%) Christian Berthiaume (Ind.); 135 (2.38%)	Gilles Berthiaume
Saint-Jacques	City councillor		Raymond Blain	Francine Auclair	Daniel Perreault	Alain Tremblay		Normand Potvin (WE); Vincent Torres (Ind)	Raymond Blain

== Elections in suburban communities (incomplete) ==
=== Dorval ===
Electoral District	Position	Total valid votes	Candidates			Incumbent
Electoral District	Position	Total valid votes	Winner	Second place	Third place	Incumbent
	Mayor	-	Peter Yeomans (acclaimed)			Peter Yeomans
East Ward 1	Councillor	-	Edgar Rouleau (acclaimed)			Edgar Rouleau
East Ward 2	Councillor	-	Emile LaCoste (acclaimed)			Emile LaCoste
East Ward 3	Councillor	-	Jules Daigle (acclaimed)			Jules Daigle
West Ward 1	Councillor	-	Robert M. Bourbeau (acclaimed)			Robert M. Bourbeau
West Ward 2	Councillor	-	Ian W. Heron (acclaimed)			Ian W. Heron
West Ward 3	Councillor	1,643	Heather Allard; 771 (46.93%)	Patricia Smith; 555 (33.78%)	Daniel Gilbert; 317 (19.29%)	Vacant (formerly Frank Richmond)

Sources: "West Island vote brings new faces into municipal politics," Montreal Gazette, November 6, 1990, A5; "Two newcomers victorious in Pointe Claire election," Montreal Gazette, November 8, 1990, G2.

=== Montréal-Nord ===
Electoral District	Position	Total valid votes	Candidates		Incumbent
Electoral District	Position	Total valid votes	Renouveau municipal	Other	Incumbent
	Mayor	-	Yves Ryan about 88%	Jean-Pierre Menard about 12%	Yves Ryan
District 1	Councillor		Antonin Dupont (elected)		Antonin Dupont
District 2	Councillor		Michelle Allaire (elected)		Michelle Allaire
District 3	Councillor		Pierre Blain (elected)		Pierre Blain
District 4	Councillor		Georgette Morin (elected)		Georgette Morin
District 5	Councillor		Maurice Belanger (elected)		Maurice Belanger
District 6	Councillor		Réal Gibeau (elected)		Réal Gibeau
District 7	Councillor		Jean-Paul Lessard (elected)		Jean-Paul Lessard
District 8	Councillor		Normand Fortin (elected)		Normand Fortin
District 9	Councillor		Armand Nadeau (elected)		Armand Nadeau
District 10	Councillor		Andre Coulombe (elected)		Andre Coulombe
District 11	Councillor		Raymond Paquin (elected)		Raymond Paquin
District 12	Councillor		Robert Guerriero (elected)		Robert Guerriero

Sources: Mike King, "Battling 272 years of experience; Mayor and his team have been in power since 1963," Montreal Gazette, 21 October 1994, A4; Mike King, "Ryan wins again; Ninth straight victory for patriarch of local mayors," Montreal Gazette, November 7, 1994, A5. The former source indicates that Lessard, Morin, Belanger, Gibeau, and Nadeau were incumbents in 1994. The latter source indicates the scale of Ryan's victory in 1990, although it does not indicate the council winners.

All of the Renouveau municipal councillors listed above were members of the Montréal-Nord city council during the 1986–90 term, and all except Armand Nadeau (who did not seek re-election in 1994) served during the 1994–98 term. Given the overwhelming dominance of the Renouveau municipal party in Montréal-Nord and the generally low rates of council turnover in this period, it may be safely assumed that all were re-elected in 1990.

=== Saint-Leonard (incomplete) ===
1990 Saint-Leonard municipal election: Mayor
Party	Candidate	Votes	%
Parti Municipal	Frank Zampino	14,461	58.04
Ralliement de Saint-Léonard	(x)Raymond Renaud	10,455	41.96
Total valid votes		24,916	100
Source: Irwin Block, "St. Leonard votes for change as Cote St. Luc re-elects Lang," Montreal Gazette, 5 November 1990, A5.

1990 Saint-Leonard municipal election: Councillor, Ward Three
Party	Candidate	Votes	%
Parti Municipal	Mario Battista	elected	
Source: Irwin Block, "St. Leonard votes for change as Cote St. Luc re-elects Lang," Montreal Gazette, 5 November 1990, A5.

1990 Saint-Leonard municipal election: Councillor, Ward Four
Party	Candidate	Votes	%
Parti Municipal	Italo Barone	elected	
Source: Irwin Block, "St. Leonard votes for change as Cote St. Luc re-elects Lang," Montreal Gazette, 5 November 1990, A5.

1990 Saint-Leonard municipal election: Councillor, Ward Six
Party	Candidate	Votes	%
Parti Municipal	(x)Dominic Perri	elected	
Source: Irwin Block, "St. Leonard votes for change as Cote St. Luc re-elects Lang," Montreal Gazette, 5 November 1990, A5.

1990 Saint-Leonard municipal election: Councillor, Ward Seven
Party	Candidate	Votes	%
Parti Municipal	(x)Yvette Bissonnet	elected	
Source: Irwin Block, "St. Leonard votes for change as Cote St. Luc re-elects Lang," Montreal Gazette, 5 November 1990, A5.

1990 Saint-Leonard municipal election: Councillor, Ward Eight
Party	Candidate	Votes	%
Parti Municipal	Vincenzo Arciresi	elected	
Source: Irwin Block, "St. Leonard votes for change as Cote St. Luc re-elects Lang," Montreal Gazette, 5 November 1990, A5.

1990 Saint-Leonard municipal election: Councillor, Ward Ten
Party	Candidate	Votes	%
Ralliement de Saint-Léonard	Domenico Moschella	elected	
Source: Irwin Block, "St. Leonard votes for change as Cote St. Luc re-elects Lang," Montreal Gazette, 5 November 1990, A5.

1990 Saint-Leonard municipal election: Councillor, Ward Twelve
Party	Candidate	Votes	%
Parti municipal	(x)Robert Zambito	elected	
Source: Irwin Block, "St. Leonard votes for change as Cote St. Luc re-elects Lang," Montreal Gazette, 5 November 1990, A5.

== Results in other Montreal-area communities ==
=== Longueuil ===
The governing Parti municipal de Longueuil was returned to office. Party leader Roger Ferland was re-elected to a second term as mayor, and the party won seventeen out of twenty seats on council. The remaining three seats were won by the opposition Parti civique de Longueuil.

Winning candidates are listed in boldface.

Electoral District	Position	Total valid votes	Candidates			Incumbent
Electoral District	Position	Total valid votes	Parti municipal	Parti civique	Independent	Incumbent
	Mayor	39,128	**Roger Ferland**; 23,424 (59.87%)	Gisèle Hamelin; 15,704 (40.13%)		Roger Ferland
Ward One	Councillor	1,448	**Pierre Beaudry**; 751 (51.86%)	Pierre Hurtubise; 697 (48.14%)		Pierre Hurtubise
Ward Two	Councillor	2,089	André Normandin; 1,039 (49.74%)	**Cécile Langevin**; 1,050 (50.26%)		André Normandin
Ward Three	Councillor	1,951	**Claude Gladu**; 1,385 (70.99%)	Diane Smith; 566 (29.01%)		Claude Gladu
Ward Four	Councillor	2,278	Gérald Marcil; 1,024 (44.95%)	**Sylvie Robidas**; 1,254 (55.05%)		Gérald Marcil
Ward Five	Councillor	1,710	**Nicole Béliveau-Zeitter**; 1,066 (62.34%)	Denis St-Laurent; 644 (37.66%)		Nicole Béliveau-Zeitter
Ward Six	Councillor	2,180	**Jacques Morissette**; 1,710 (78.44%)	Richard Gagnon; 470 (21.56%)		Jacques Morissette
Ward Seven	Councillor	1,796	**Roger Lacombe**; 932 (51.89%)	Charles A. Ashton; 864 (48.11%)		Roger Lacombe
Ward Eight	Councillor	1,780	**Johane Fontaine-Deshaies**; 975 (54.78%)	Josée Labelle; 805 (45.22%)		Gilles Déry
Ward Nine	Councillor	2,331	Magella Richard; 1,139 (48.86%)	**Pierre Nantel**; 1,192 (51.14%)		Magella Richard
Ward Ten	Councillor	1,627	**Manon Hénault**; 889 (54.64%)	Jean Babin; 738 (45.36%)		Manon Hénault
Ward Eleven	Councillor	1,864	**Serge Sévigny**; 1,357 (72.80%)	Josette Jacques; 507 (27.20%)		Serge Sévigny
Ward Twelve	Councillor	1,762	**Michel Champagne**; 1,166 (66.17%)	Maurice Collette; 596 (33.83%)		Lise Sauvé-Thiverge
Ward Thirteen	Councillor	1,608	**Jean St-Hilaire**; 1,079 (67.10%)	Didier Robidas; 529 (32.90%)		Jean St-Hilaire
Ward Fourteen	Councillor	1,754	**Michel Timperio**; 1,373 (78.28%)	Jean-Pierre Sylvain; 381 (21.72%)		Michel Timperio
Ward Fifteen	Councillor	1,525	**Florent Charest**; 1,136 (74.49%)	Jean-Pierre Trahan; 389 (25.51%)		Florent Charest
Ward Sixteen	Councillor	2,076	**Georges Touten**; 940 (45.28%)	Yves Couture; 685 (33.00%)	Hélène Dupuis; 451 (21.72%)	Georges Touten
Ward Seventeen	Councillor	2,084	**Pierre Racicot**; 1,404 (67.37%)	Rolande Ste-Marie; 680 (32.63%)		André Letourneau
Ward Eighteen	Councillor	2,140	**Jacques Milette**; 1,359 (63.50%)	Yves Paquette; 781 (36.50%)		Jacques Milette
Ward Nineteen	Councillor	2,753	**Benoît Danault**; 1,712 (62.19%)	Pierre Lestage; 1,041 (37.81%)		Benoît Danault
Ward Twenty	Councillor	2,419	**Léo Paduano**; 1,533 (63.37%)	Pardo Chiocchio; 886 (*36.63%)		new division

Sources: Mike King, "Two mayors unseated on South Shore," Montreal Gazette, November 5, 1990, A5; Mike King, "Ferland outlasts foe in Longueuil race; Municipal Party keeps control with 17 of 20 seats on council," Montreal Gazette, November 8, 1990, G1; Le Parti municipal de Longueuil: Roger Ferland, le gestionnaire, Société historique et culturelle du Marigot, accessed February 19, 2014.
