= Sonya Biddle =

Canadian actress and politician (1957–2022)

Member of the Montreal City Council
- In office 1998–2001

Personal details
- Born: 31 December 1957
- Died: 19 January 2022 (aged 64)
- Party: Vision Montreal
- Relations: Stephanie Biddle (sister)
- Parent: Charlie Biddle (father)

Sonya Biddle (31 December 1957 – 19 January 2022) was a Canadian actress and politician in Montreal, Quebec. She served on the Montreal City Council from 1998 to 2001 as a member of Vision Montreal.

== Early life ==
Born on 31 December 1957, Biddle was the daughter of well-known Montreal jazz bassist Charlie Biddle and the sister of jazz singer Stephanie Biddle. Her mother, a white francophone woman, was ostracized by other members of her family in the 1950s for having married a black man.

In her teen years she was a close friend of Mireille Métellus and Michaëlle Jean.

== Career ==
=== Acting ===
She was a noted stage actress in Montreal during the 1980s and early 1990s, appearing in performances of For Colored Girls Who Have Considered Suicide When the Rainbow Is Enuf, Irene and Lillian Forever, A Woman Alone, The Colored Museum, Fool Blast, No Men Beyond This Point, The Haunting, and Canad-uh? In 1990, she directed the play, My Mom Was on the Radio. For a time, she and her partner Allan Patrick were the leaders and organizers of the Fool House Theatre Corporation, and in the mid-1990s she was involved in organizing community events, concerts, and festivals.

Biddle appeared in a number of films, such as The Bone Collector in 1999.

=== Politics ===
Biddle had strong connections with the leadership of Vision Montreal before seeking political office herself; her partner Allan Patrick was an organizer for the party in the 1994 municipal election and subsequently became an advisor to mayor Pierre Bourque on issues affecting Montreal's anglophone community.

She was elected to city council in the 1998 Montreal municipal election, narrowly defeating longtime incumbent Sam Boskey of the Democratic Coalition in Décarie. During the campaign, she highlighted her connections to the mayor and promised that the city would purchase the vacant Cinema V building to create a cultural centre for local artists and musicians. Vision Montreal won a majority government in this election, and in November 1998 Biddle was appointed an associate member of the Montreal executive committee (i.e., the municipal cabinet).

Following extensive lobbying by Biddle and Patrick, the city purchased Cinema V for $571,000 in August 1999. The following June, council awarded a one million dollar grant and title to the building to the non-profit Cinema VI Corporation, a successor body to the Fool House Theatre Corporation. Biddle introduced the council motion to end debate on the issue immediately prior to the final vote. Some councillors strongly criticized the award; prominent among them was Marvin Rotrand, who had previously drawn attention to the high costs of renovating the site and noted Biddle and Patrick's historical links to the Cinema VI group. Despite the efforts of Biddle and Patrick, the site was ultimately not renovated, and in 2002 it was reported that Cinema VI had run out of money.

In March 2000, Biddle, Patrick, and fellow Vision Montreal councillor Kettly Beauregard accompanied Bourque on a somewhat controversial trip to Trinidad and Tobago. City officials contended that the trip was intended as research on the organization of summer carnivals, while critics alleged it was simply a junket undertaken for political purposes.

She was defeated by Marcel Tremblay of the Montreal Island Citizens Union (MICU) in the 2001 municipal election. She ran for borough mayor of Côte-des-Neiges–Notre-Dame-de-Grâce in 2005, but was defeated by MICU incumbent Michael Applebaum.

== Death ==
Biddle died of intestinal cancer on 19 January 2022, at the age of 64.

== Electoral record ==
2005 Montreal municipal election: Borough Mayor, Côte-des-Neiges–Notre-Dame-de-Grâce
Party	Candidate	Votes	%
Citizens Union	Michael Applebaum	14,646	48.11
Vision Montreal	Sonya Biddle	8,013	26.32
Team Jeremy Searle	Jeremy Searle	5,949	19.54
Independent	Alexandre Montagano	1,837	6.03
Total valid votes		30,445	–
Source: Election results, 1833-2005 (in French), City of Montreal.

2001 Montreal municipal election: Councillor, Décarie
Party	Candidate	Votes	%
Montreal Island Citizens Union	Marcel Tremblay	3,792	61.66
Vision Montreal	Sonya Biddle (incumbent)	2,358	38.34
Total valid votes		6,150	100
Source: Election results, 1833-2005 (in French), City of Montreal.

1998 Montreal municipal election: Councillor, Décarie
Party	Candidate	Votes	%
Vision Montreal	Sonya Biddle	1,737	33.14
Democratic Coalition	Sam Boskey (incumbent)	1,669	31.85
New Montreal	Michèle Ciampini	1,274	24.31
Team Montreal	Hubert Simart	561	10.70
Total valid votes		5,241	100.00
Source: Official Results, City of Montreal.

== Filmography ==
=== Film ===
Year	Title	Role	Notes
1987	Rebel High	Raphaela	
1989	Snake Eater II: The Drug Buster	Lucinda	
1993	Sweet Killing	Sales Clerk	
1999	The Bone Collector	Nurse	
