= Jack Chadirdjian =

Jack H. Chadirdjian is a politician, an attorney, and a City Councillor in Montreal, Quebec, Canada.

== City Councillor ==
He was elected to Montreal's City Council as a Vision Montreal candidate in the district of Darlington in 1994, defeating RCM incumbent Hubert Simard.

== Leader of the Opposition ==
In 1997, he left Vision Montreal and sat as an Independent. With five other colleagues, he joined Jacques Duchesneau's Nouveau Montréal (New Montreal) party and became Leader of the Opposition.

== Political decline ==
In 1998 he was defeated by Vision Montreal candidate Jean Fortier.

== See also ==
- Vision Montreal Crisis, 1997

== Electoral record (incomplete) ==
1990 Montreal municipal election: Councillor, Acadie
Party	Candidate	Votes	%
Montreal Citizens' Movement	Gérard Legault (incumbent)	2,756	50.57
Civic Party of Montreal	Jack Chadirdjian	1,829	33.56
Municipal Party	Edmond Bishara	727	13.34
Democratic Coalition	Shayne Kenny	138	2.53
Total valid votes		5,450	100
Source: Election results, 1833-2005 (in French), City of Montreal.

== Footnotes ==
Political offices
Preceded by Hubert Simard (RCM)	City Councillor, District of Darlington; 1994-1998	Succeeded by Jean Fortier (Vision Montreal)
