= Roger Ferland =

Roger Ferland is a retired politician in the Canadian province of Quebec. He was the mayor of Longueuil from 1987 to 1994, having previously served as a school commissioner and as a member of the Longueuil city council.

== Private life and school commissioner ==
Ferland was a computer specialist in private life who worked for several years with Hydro-Québec. He was first elected as a school commissioner in 1972, and at one time he served as a school board chair.

== City councillor ==
Ferland was a founding member of the Parti municipal de Longueuil and was first elected to council under its banner in 1978. The results of the 1978 election were inconclusive: Parti civique de Longueuil leader Marcel Robidas was re-elected as mayor, but the Parti municipal won nine of seventeen seats and initially held a functioning majority on council until one of its representatives was expelled from the party.

Ferland served as the Parti municipal's main spokesperson on council in this period in place of party leader Paul Viau, who did not seek a council seat in 1978 and was defeated in that year's mayoral contest. Ferland considered running for party leader in 1981 after Viau's resignation, but he ultimately stood aside in favour of Jacques Finet.

Ferland was re-elected in the 1982 municipal election, which was won by the Parti municipal under Finet's leadership. Ferland was chosen as council speaker after the election. He was returned for a third term in the 1986 municipal election, in which the Parti municipal won every council seat.

In November 1986, Ferland was appointed as a director of the Montreal South Shore Transit Corp.

== Mayor ==
=== First term (1987–90) ===
Jacques Finet resigned as mayor in April 1987, and Ferland was chosen without opposition to be the Parti municipal's new leader and mayoral candidate for a by-election the following month. He promised "continuity" in government and said that he would introduce more friendly "customer-client" relations between Longueuil residents and municipal employees. On election day, Ferland defeated Jacques Olivier, a former member of the House of Commons of Canada, by a significant margin. He was sworn in as mayor on June 10, 1987.

In late 1987, Ferland called for municipalities to be given greater control over the Saint-Hubert Airport. He was quoted as saying, "We want to favor our industrial parks and if we have a hand in managing the airport, we can construct routes with that in mind." Shortly thereafter, he began exploring options for constructing a horse racing track in Longueuil in the event that Montreal's famed Blue Bonnets Raceway was shut down.

As mayor, Ferland presided over a municipal policy that required Longueuil public servants to live within the city during their terms of employment. The Canadian Union of Public Employees (CUPE) challenged this policy in 1988, on the grounds that it violated the Canadian Charter of Rights and Freedoms and the Quebec Charter of Rights and Freedoms.

Ferland and other South Shore mayors declined to pay a fifteen million dollar transit bill submitted by the Montreal Urban Community Transit Corp. (MUCTC) in early 1988 to cover a deficit. The mayors instead argued that Montreal Island residents should pay a fee increase, an option that was rejected by Montreal Urban Community councillors. The transit corporations of Montreal, Laval, and the South Shore signed a comprehensive deal the following year to form a new regional transit authority, ending years of tension between the communities.

In September 1988, Ferland and city urban planner Claude Doyon introduced Longueuil's first official plan since the city's incorporation in 1874. Highlights included a municipal housing code to set hygienic standards for rental units, an expansion of the city's existing "green network," refurbishing parts of Chambly Road and Roland Therrien Boulevard to attract businesses, and the construction of both a riverfront development and a regional centre.

Ferland oversaw Longueuil's re-assumption of control over the city's municipal court in 1989, fourteen years after the city had given oversight responsibility to the provincial government. The following year, he oversaw the creation of a municipal arts and culture development board and introduced a municipal recycling program; he also launched Longueuil's Parcours du Cerf golf course and a new city theatre. In June 1990, he and Montreal mayor Jean Doré launched the first operational ferry link between Montreal and Longueuil in sixty years.

As mayor of Longueuil, Ferland also served as a member of the Champlain County Regional Municipality. In 1990, he was chosen as the first president of the Conference of South Shore mayors, a group founded for the purpose of providing a united political voice for the area.

=== Second term (1990–94) ===
Ferland was re-elected as mayor in the 1990 municipal election, in a divisive contest against Gisele Hamelin of the Parti civique. Ferland's Parti municipal won seventeen of twenty council seats, as against three for Hamelin's party. One of the election's key issues was a controversial condominium project on Île Charron that Ferland supported and Hamelin opposed. (Notwithstanding Ferland's victory, the project was eventually stopped in the face of opposition by a local citizens' movement.)

Shortly after the 1990 election, Ferland was chosen as vice-chair of the Montreal South Shore Transit Corp. He was also an inaugural member of the Metropolitan Public Transit Council, which met for the first time in January 1991.

Ferland continued to serve as president of the Conference of South Shore mayors after the 1990 election. In this capacity, he opposed the provincial government's plans to cut five hundred million dollars from municipal transfer payments in early 1991, saying that he would be willing to support a new gasoline tax instead. Ferland later called for the South Shore to become a distinct administrative region within Quebec, although this plan did not win support from the provincial government.

In November 1991, Ferland led the Longueuil council in approving a new municipal code of ethics that gave councillors six months to end conflict-of-interest situations. Gisele Hamelin of the Parti civique criticized the law as vague, arguing that it did not properly cover gifts received by councillors.

Ferland established a heritage committee in early 1992 to oversee historical buildings in Old Longueuil. Critics later charged that the committee was biased in favour of corporate interests and that its membership was not chosen democratically.

In October 1992, Ferland announced the Longueuil had joined an international network of medium-sized municipalities that also included Namur, Belgium; Poitiers, France; Maidstone and Northampton in the United Kingdom; Coimbra, Portugal; and Pécs, Hungary. He indicated that the network was focused on achieving economic goals and that reciprocal visits and seminars were being planned.

Ferland urged the provincial government to merge the municipalities of Longueuil, Boucherville, Brossard, Saint-Hubert, Saint-Lambert, Greenfield Park, and LeMoyne into a single city in early 1993, arguing that this would increase efficiency and promote tax equity. The proposal received little support from officials in the other cities or from Longueuil councillors, and the province did not move forward with the idea. Ferland later endorsed a different plan to create a supra-municipal body running from Châteauguay to Contrecoeur that had broader support from municipal leaders. Ferland served as prefect of the Champlain County Regional Municipality in this period; in December 1993, he and the leader of the Lajemmerais Regional County Municipality endorsed the creation of a new body to represent their municipalities.

==== Fragmentation of the Parti Municipal (1992–94) ====
Opposition Parti civique councillors demanded Ferland's resignation in June 1992, arguing that he had changed municipal rules to favour five developers working on a luxury housing project and had failed to provide opposition councillors with the costs of the policy change. The mayor's executive assistant responded that Ferland would not resign, that city staff had followed normal procedures in processing the information, and that a deliberate "political decision" had been made to support housing development during an economic downturn. Shortly after this exchange, council Roger Lacombe resigned from the Parti municipal to sit as an independent, charging that the city's policies were hurting small contractors.

The governing board of the Parti municipal expelled councillor Michel Timperio at Ferland's urging in September 1992, without having first consulted the party caucus. Five more councillors later resigned from the party in protest. These developments left Ferland with only a one-seat majority on council. Media reports from the period indicate that the primary cause of the split was disagreement over a proposed land-swap between the city and a private developer. Ferland lost his council majority in December 1992, when councillor Leo Paduano resigned from the Parti municipal after a contentious council meeting in which the opposition factions unsuccessfully sought a tax freeze and a series of spending cuts.

Ferland himself unexpectedly resigned from the Parti municipal in January 1993 and pledged to serve the last two years of his term as an independent. He was quoted as saying, "Recent events have caused me to conclude that [...] the indispensable bond of confidence that has to exist between the leader of a party and his caucus simply no longer exists, at least not with an important part of the caucus." He did not align himself with the other former Parti municipal councillors, who remained opposed to his administration. In late January 1993, council voted to choose Florent Charest, a critic of Ferland, as council's new speaker.

In May 1993, council speaker Florent Charest ruled that Ferland had been in an "apparent conflict-of-interest" in January when he voted to select a law firm for the city that was also representing him in a separate case. Ferland rejected the charge, and an aide described the speaker's decision as "very subjective."

Ferland announced in April 1994 that he would not be a candidate in that year's municipal election. He instead endorsed Claude Gladu, who had remained with the Parti municipal through the divisions of the previous two years, to become his successor. Gladu was elected as mayor and ultimately served for three terms.

== Subsequent career ==
Ferland supported the Canadian federalist option in Quebec's 1995 referendum on sovereignty. He served as co-chair of the "Non" campaign in the Marie-Victorin electoral district and was a prominent spokesperson for the federalist option in the Montérégie region. When the "Non" option won a narrow majority, Ferland commented that the results were a message to English Canada that further constitutional change was needed.

== Electoral record ==
1990 Longueuil municipal election: Mayor of Longueuil
Party	Candidate	Votes	%
Parti municipal de Longueuil	Roger Ferland (incumbent)	23,424	59.87
Parti civique de Longueuil	Gisèle Hamelin	15,704	40.13
Total valid votes		39,128	100
Source: Mike King, "Ferland outlasts foe in Longueuil race; Municipal Party keeps control with 17 of 20 seats on council," Montreal Gazette, 8 November 1990, G1.

Longueuil municipal election, May 30, 1987 (by-election): Mayor of Longueuil
Party	Candidate	Votes	%
Parti municipal de Longueuil	Roger Ferland	18,596	71.63
Independent	Jacques Olivier	7,035	27.10
Independent	Jacques Gendron	330	1.27
Total valid votes		25,961	100
Source: James Mennie, "Ferland whips ex-MP to win Longueuil mayoralty," Montreal Gazette, 1 June 1987, A3.

1986 Longueuil municipal election: Councillor, Ward Four
Party	Candidate	Votes	%
Parti municipal de Longueuil	Roger Ferland (incumbent)	1,380	69.00
Parti civique de Longueuil	Marc E. Decelles	620	31.00
Total valid votes		2,000	100
Source: Le Parti municipal de Longueuil: Jacques Finet, l'innovateur, Société historique et culturelle du Marigot, accessed 19 February 2014.

1982 Longueuil municipal election: Councillor, Ward Four
Party	Candidate	Votes	%
Parti municipal de Longueuil	Roger Ferland (incumbent)	1,436	59.54
Parti civique de Longueuil	Yves Lalonde	877	36.36
Independent	H.-P. Germain	99	4.10
Total valid votes		2,412	100
Source: Le Parti municipal de Longueuil: Le premier mandat 1978 - 1982, Société historique et culturelle du Marigot, accessed 22 January 2014.

1978 Longueuil municipal election: Councillor, Ward Four
Party	Candidate	Votes	%
Parti municipal de Longueuil	Roger Ferland	1,093	41.70
Parti civique de Longueuil	Bernard Brisson	879	33.54
Independent	Gilles Leduc	361	13.77
Parti de la réforme municipale	Henri D'Amour	288	10.99
Total valid votes		2,621	100
Source: Le Parti municipal de Longueuil: Les origines du Parti municipal, Société historique et culturelle du Marigot, accessed 10 January 2014.
