= Cousineau =

Cousineau is a surname. Notable people with the surname include:

- Claude Cousineau (born 1950), Canadian politician
- Guy Cousineau (born 1937), Canadian politician
- Léa Cousineau, Canadian politician
- Marcel Cousineau (born 1973), Canadian ice hockey player
- Marie-Hélène Cousineau, Canadian film director and producer
- Philémon Cousineau (1874–1959), Canadian politician
- Phil Cousineau (born 1952), American author, screenwriter and filmmaker
- René Cousineau (1930–2002), Canadian politician
- Tom Cousineau (born 1957), American pro football player
- Tony Cousineau, American professional poker player
