= Pierre Gagnier =

Canadian politician

Borough mayor for Ahuntsic-Cartierville and Montreal City Councillor
- In office January 1, 2010 – November 16, 2017
- Preceded by: Marie-Andrée Beaudoin
- Succeeded by: Émilie Thuillier

Personal details
- Party: Parti municipal (1990-1991); Independent (1991-1992); Parti civique (1992-1993); Independent (1993-1994); Vision Montréal (1994-1997); Independent (1997); Action municipale (1997-1998); Nouveau Montréal (1998); UCIM (2001); Projet Montréal (2009-2010); Independent (2010-2013); Équipe Denis Coderre (2013-2017)

Pierre Gagnier is a city councillor from Montreal, Quebec, Canada. Since 2009, he has served as the mayor of the Ahuntsic-Cartierville borough. He was a member of the Projet Montréal municipal political party. On December 27, 2010, he announced that he would quit Projet Montréal and sit as an independent. He reaffiliated with the new Équipe Denis Coderre in 2013.

Gagnier had previously served as a city councillor for the Cartierville district from 1990 to 1998. Originally elected as a member of the Parti municipal de Montréal, he was also at one time the vice president of Vision Montreal and served as former mayor Pierre Bourque's economic development advisor in the late 1990s. In the early 1990s, he was the leader of the Civic Party of Montreal and leader of the official opposition at Montreal City Hall until October 1993.

== Electoral record (incomplete) ==
1990 Montreal municipal election: Councillor, Cartierville
Party	Candidate	Votes	%
Municipal Party	Pierre Gagnier	2,359	47.95
Montreal Citizens' Movement	Kathleen Verdon (incumbent)	1,599	32.50
Civic Party of Montreal	Sylvain Campeau	801	16.28
Democratic Coalition	Caroline Singleton	161	3.27
Total valid votes		4,920	100
Source: Election results, 1833-2005 (in French), City of Montreal.
