= List of leaders of the opposition of Montreal =

This is a list of the leaders of the opposition party at the Montreal City Hall. Party colours do not indicate affiliation or resemblance to a provincial or a federal party.

Name	Electoral district	Took office	Left office	Party
Michael Fainstat	City Councillor, Notre-Dame-de-Grâce	1974	1978	RCM
Nick Auf der Maur	City Councillor, Côte-des-Neiges	1978	1982	GAM
Michael Fainstat	City Councillor, La Confédération	1982	1984	RCM
Jean Doré	City Councillor, Saint-Jean-Baptiste	1984	1986	RCM
Germain Prégent	City Councillor, Saint-Henri	1986	1988	Civic Party
Nick Auf der Maur	City Councillor, Peter-McGill	1988	1989	Civic Party
Nick Auf der Maur	City Councillor, Peter-McGill	1989	1990	Municipal Party
Alain André	City Councillor, Ahuntsic	1990	1991	Municipal Party
Sam Boskey	City Councillor, Décarie	1991	1992	Democratic Coalition
Nick Auf der Maur	City Councillor, Peter-McGill	1992	1994	Civic Party
André Lavallée	City Councillor, Bourbonnière	1994	1997	RCM
Thérèse Daviau	City Councillor, Plateau-Mont-Royal	1997	1998	RCM
Jack Chadirdjian	City Councillor, Darlington	1998	1998	New Montreal
Michel Prescott	City Councillor, Jeanne-Mance	1998	2001	RCM
Pierre Bourque	City Councillor, Marie-Victorin, Rosemont–La Petite-Patrie	2001	2003	Vision Montreal
Martin Lemay	City Councillor, Sainte-Marie, Ville-Marie	2003	2003	Vision Montreal
Pierre Bourque	City Councillor, Marie-Victorin, Rosemont–La Petite-Patrie	2003	2006	Vision Montreal
Noushig Eloyan	City Councillor, Bordeaux-Cartierville, Ahuntsic-Cartierville	2006	2008	Vision Montreal
Benoit Labonté	Borough Mayor, Ville-Marie	2008	2009	Vision Montreal
Gaëtan Primeau	City Councillor, Tétreaultville, Mercier–Hochelaga-Maisonneuve	2009	2009	Vision Montreal
Louise Harel	City Councillor, Maisonneuve–Longue-Pointe, Mercier–Hochelaga-Maisonneuve	2009	2013	Vision Montreal
Richard Bergeron	City Councillor, Saint-Jacques, Ville-Marie	2013	2014	Projet Montreal
Luc Ferrandez	Borough Mayor, Le Plateau Mont-Royal	2014	2016	Projet Montreal
Valérie Plante	City Councillor, Sainte-Marie, Ville-Marie	2016	2017	Projet Montreal
Lionel Perez	City Councillor, Darlington, Côte-des-Neiges–Notre-Dame-de-Grâce	2017	2021	Ensemble Montréal
Aref Salem	City Councillor, Norman-McLaren, Saint-Laurent	2021	2025	Ensemble Montréal
Ericka Alneus	City Councillor, Étienne-Desmarteau, Rosemont–La Petite-Patrie	2025		Projet Montréal

== See also ==
- List of mayors of Montreal
- Montreal City Council
- History of Quebec
