= Daniel Boucher =

Daniel Boucher may refer to:

- Daniel Boucher (musician) (born 1971), Québécois musician
- Daniel Boucher (politician), Québecois politician
