= Luc Larivée =

Member of Montreal City Council

Luc Larivée (January 17, 1927 – July 30, 2007) was a physician and politician in Montreal, Quebec, Canada. He chaired the Montreal Catholic School Commission (MCSC) from 1976 to 1983 and served for many years on the Montreal City Council.

== Early life and career ==
Born in Montreal, Larivée received a medical degree from the Université de Montréal in 1954. For many years, he ran a general practice from his home. He spoke French, English, and Italian.

== Chair of the Montreal Catholic School Commission ==
Larivée was first elected to the Catholic School Commission in the 1973 school board election, winning in the eighth district with an endorsement from the conservative and confessional Mouvement scolaire confessionnel (MSC). He became commission chair in 1976, succeeding Thérèse Lavoie-Roux, who had been elected to the National Assembly of Quebec.

As chair of Montreal's largest school commission, Larivée was a prominent critic of René Lévesque's Parti Québécois (PQ), which governed Quebec from 1976 to 1985. At one stage, he charged that anglophones would "more or less eventually disappear" from Quebec as a result of the PQ's language legislation. In 1977, he openly defied the government's language policy to permit more than 800 children of immigrants to continue attending English classes until the end of the school year.

He was re-elected without difficulty in the 1977 school board election, in which the primary issue was the confessional status of the commission's schools. Larivée and his MSC-supported allies favoured retention of the Roman Catholic system, while rival candidates from the Regroupement scolaire progressiste (RSP) were open to the prospect of secularization. Candidates endorsed by the MSC won all but one of the available seats, and Larivée continued to serve as chair in the term that followed.

Larivée campaigned for the Canadian federalist option in Quebec's 1980 referendum on sovereignty, chairing the "Non" committee in Hochelaga—Maisonneuve. He later acknowledged that this was a mistake, saying that he should have remained neutral in light of his position as school commission chair.

The provincial government briefly put the commission under trusteeship in 1980, criticizing Larivée's handling of a teachers' strike. Larivée was required to face the electorate in the 1980 board election while the strike was still taking place and was re-elected by only twelve votes against a candidate endorsed by the teachers' union.

In 1981, the PQ government distributed materials critical of Canadian prime minister Pierre Trudeau's constitutional proposals to high school history teachers across the province. Larivée described the materials as "very political" and led the MCSC in ordering its history teachers not to teach them in class.

Larivée subsequently opposed the PQ government's prohibition against teaching English as a second language to children in French schools before the fourth grade. He charged that several PQ ministers believed teaching second languages to young children would have detrimental effects, adding that he himself was entirely opposed to this viewpoint. "I believe the whole problem is related to political problems," he said. "I've been all over the world and I've seen students studying many, many languages and they have no problems."

He stood down as commission chair in 1983 and was not a candidate in that year's board election.

== City councillor ==
Drapeau administration

Larivée was first elected to city council in the 1978 municipal election, winning in the Longue-Pointe ward as a candidate of Montreal mayor Jean Drapeau's Civic Party. The Civic Party won a landslide majority, and Larivée served as a backbench supporter of the Drapeau administration. When Drapeau considered retirement in 1982, Larivée said that he would consider running to succeed him; some believe this speculation was premature and adversely affected his leadership prospects in later years.

Drapeau chose not to retire in 1982 and instead led the Civic Party to another victory in that year's municipal election. Larivée was re-elected without difficulty in Longue-Pointe. When Drapeau finally announced his retirement four years later, Larivée became a candidate to succeed him as party leader. He said at one stage that he was prepared to withdraw in favour of Yvon Lamarre, but Lamarre chose not to run and Larivée continued his candidacy. A Montreal Gazette editorial from this time described him as an unknown quality in municipal politics, noting that he seldom said anything in caucus or the council chambers. For his part, Larivée commented that he had not joined Drapeau's executive committee (i.e., the municipal cabinet) as doing so would have left him unable to handle his responsibilities as commission chair. His supporters included executive committee member Michel Morin. He ultimately finished second against Claude Dupras, who led the party into the 1986 municipal election.

The 1986 election was a disaster for the Civic Party, which was reduced to only one seat on council. Larivée was personally defeated by Nicole Boudreau of the Montreal Citizens' Movement (MCM).

Bourque administration

Larivée was re-elected to council in the 1994 municipal election as a candidate of Pierre Bourque's newly formed Vision Montreal, defeating incumbent MCM councillor Diane Barbeau in Hochelaga. Vision Montreal won a council majority, and Larivée was subsequently chosen as council speaker.

In October 1995, councillor Jeremy Searle attempted to introduce a motion to permit Montrealers to vote in referendum on remaining in Canada in the event of a sovereigntist victory in the 1995 Quebec referendum on sovereignty. Larivée rejected the motion, declaring that it was based on a hypothetical scenario and further indicating that the city's legal department considered Montreal's status within Canada to be a matter outside municipal jurisdiction. This decision was strongly opposed by Searle and some other councillors.

Larivée was not a prominent figure in Vision Montreal's internal crisis of 1997, though he later became known as a prominent supporter of Bourque's leadership.

In February 1998, Larivée ruled that Bourque had not violated Montreal's conflict-of-interest rules by accepting a paid trip to China the previous month; his conclusion was that Bourque had been invited as a botanical expert and not in a political capacity. Opposition councillors argued that this ruling violated the neutrality of the speaker's office, a charge that Larivée rejected. After continued opposition requests, Bourque's trip was later reviewed by Montreal's ethics committee, which Larivée also chaired.

Vision Montreal was returned to another majority government in the 1998 municipal election, and Larivée was personally re-elected in Hochelaga. Despite opposition concerns, he was re-appointed by Bourque for another term as council speaker. He faced criticism in early 2000 after using Montreal police officers to escort opposition leader Michel Prescott from the council chamber, after Prescott allegedly used unparliamentary language in a debate against Bourque. Twelve opposition councillors demanded Larivée's removal from office, a request that Bourque rejected.

As speaker, Larivée was technically responsible for overseeing the presence of a Christian crucifix in the council chambers. He defended the cross's presence, saying "a cross with Christ in a public room is a part of the general culture of the Western world. It is not part of religion for me. It is mostly part of the general culture."

Tremblay administration

Larivée was re-elected to a fifth term in the 2001 municipal election, in which Vision Montreal was defeated by Gérald Tremblay's Montreal Island Citizens Union (MICU). Following the election, Larivée initially served in opposition as chair of the Vision Montreal caucus.

He resigned from Vision to sit as an independent councillor in October 2002, charging that the party was being torn apart through internal jockeying over nominations for the provincial Action démocratique du Québec (ADQ) party in the buildup to the 2003 provincial election. He joined MICU in December 2003, over the objections of some within Tremblay's party.

By virtue of holding his council seat, Larivée also served on the Mercier–Hochelaga-Maisonneuve borough council from 2001 to 2005. He was defeated by Vision Montreal candidate Laurent Blanchard in the 2005 municipal election.

== Death ==
Larivée died at age 80 on June 30, 2007.

== Electoral record ==
City Council electoral record
Election	Position	Party	Total votes	% of total votes	References
1978 Montreal municipal election	Ward Three Councillor	Civic Party of Montreal	4,100	57.80	
1982 Montreal municipal election	Longue-Pointe Councillor	Civic Party of Montreal	3,463	51.27	
1986 Montreal municipal election	Longue-Pointe Councillor	Civic Party of Montreal	1,878	30.60	
1994 Montreal municipal election	Hochelaga Councillor	Vision Montreal	2,040	49.20	
1998 Montreal municipal election	Hochelaga Councillor	Vision Montreal	1,879	42.96	
2001 Montreal municipal election	Hochelaga Councillor	Vision Montreal	4,418	66.58	
2005 Montreal municipal election	Hochelaga Councillor	Citizens Union	2,230	36.01	

School trustee electoral record
Election	Position	Party	Total votes	% of total votes	References
1973 Montreal Catholic School Commission election	District Eight Commissioner	Mouvement scolaire confessionnel	1,916	35.93	
1977 Montreal Catholic School Commission election	District Eight Commissioner	Mouvement scolaire confessionnel			
1980 Montreal Catholic School Commission election	District Eight Commissioner	Mouvement scolaire confessionnel	1,597	50.19	
