= Stephanie Biddle =

Canadian jazz singer and actress (born 1963)

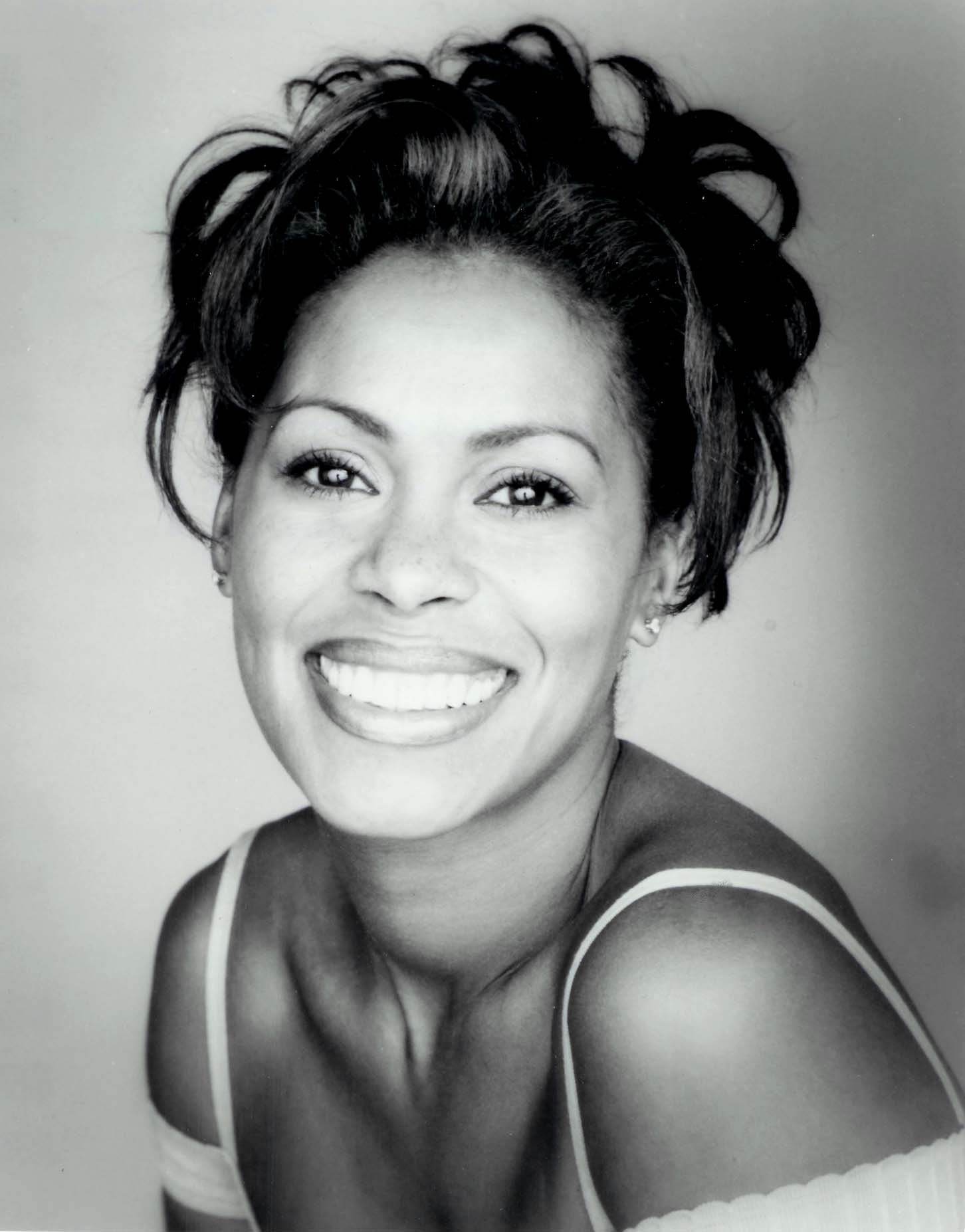

Background information
- Born: Stephanie Andrea Biddle; August 23, 1963 (age 62); LaSalle, Quebec, Canada
- Genres: Vocal jazz
- Occupations: Jazz singer, actress
- Years active: 1987–present
- Label: Elan
- Website: stephaniebiddle.com
- Relatives: Sonya Biddle (sister)

Stephanie Andrea Biddle (born August 23, 1963) is a Canadian jazz singer and actress.

== Career ==
Biddle was born in Quebec to jazz bassist Charlie Biddle and a French-Canadian mother. During part of her childhood she lived in Sainte-Agathe-des-Monts. When she was 15, she moved to Montreal and began modeling. From 1987–1989, she sang traditional pop and jazz standards at clubs and weddings with the band Living Proof. Aided by a record producer in Paris, she recorded the hit single "Dis-moi" (1991) which peaked at No. 11 on the French pop chart. For the next few years she sang in Le Gosier, Guadeloupe.

Biddle appeared in the films Crunch (1979), The Moderns (1988), The Whole Nine Yards (2000), One Eyed King (2001), and in the television movie A Diva's Christmas Carol with Vanessa L. Williams. She performed in La Haut at Rouen Opera House. She also had a role in the 2001 French-language film Karmen Geï, "a re-make of the movie Carmen.

In 1991, her debut album, Dis-moi, was released,

== Personal life ==
Her brother Charles Jr. is also a performer. Her older sister Sonya Biddle was a former Montreal city councillor and her younger sister Tracy, a bartender and singer, is a freelance writer and hosted radio shows on CBC radio network.
