= Thérèse Daviau =

Canadian politician (1946–2002)

Montreal City Councillor
- In office 1974–1978
- Preceded by: Aime Sauve (Civic Party)
- Succeeded by: Aime Sauve (Civic Party)
- Constituency: Saint-Michel

Montreal City Councillor
- In office 1986–1990
- Preceded by: Jean Doré (RCM)
- Succeeded by: District abolished
- Constituency: Saint-Jean-Baptiste

Montreal City Councillor
- In office 1990–1994
- Preceded by: André Cardinal (RCM)
- Succeeded by: André Cardinal (RCM)
- Constituency: Plateau-Mont-Royal

Leader of the Opposition
- In office 1998–1998

Personal details
- Born: Thérèse Daviau-Bergeron; 1946 Montreal, Quebec, Canada
- Died: February 1, 2002 (aged 55–56) Montreal, Quebec, Canada
- Citizenship: Canadian
- Party: Montreal Citizens' Movement
- Education: Université de Montréal
- Occupation: Politician, attorney
- Awards: Thérèse-Daviau Award

Thérèse Daviau, also known as Thérèse Daviau-Bergeron (1946–2002), was a Canadian politician, an attorney and a City Councillor in Montreal, Quebec.

== Career ==
Daviau was born in 1946 and received a law degree from Université de Montréal. In the early seventies she became a founding member of the progressive Montreal Citizens' Movement, also known as Rassemblement des citoyens et citoyennes de Montréal (RCM) in French.

=== City councillor ===
Daviau was elected to Montreal's City Council in 1974 over opponents Civic Party incumbent Aime Sauve with 17 other MCM candidates, and represented the district of Saint-Michel, but was defeated in 1978 when Mayor Jean Drapeau's Civic Party of Montreal took nearly all the seats at City Hall.

Daviau ran again in 1986 in the district of Saint-Jean-Baptiste and won. She was re-elected in 1990 and in 1994, representing the district of Plateau-Mont-Royal.

=== Party leader ===
In 1998 Daviau became the RCM nominee for the mayoral election and Leader of the Opposition. Not long after though, she left the party and announced that she would support Jacques Duchesneau for mayor. She sat as an Independent and did not run for re-election in 1998.

=== Retirement ===
Daviau became the vice-president of a public relations firm and died on February 1, 2002.

=== Personal life ===
Daviau is the mother of Geneviève Bergeron, one of the 14 victims of the École Polytechnique massacre of December 6, 1989.

== Honors ==
Biennially, since 2004, the City of Montreal recognizes a person's commitment and contribution to the community by awarding the Thérèse-Daviau Award.

The citizen of the year award recognizes an individual who has distinguished themselves through their work in social development, sports and leisure, or culture, creating a significant contribution to improving the quality of life of Montrealers, or to advancing municipal democracy. Daviau was noted for these qualities over more than a quarter century, by defending the interests of Montrealers in municipal politics.

Political offices
Preceded by Jean Doré (RCM)	City Councillor, District of Saint-Jean-Baptiste; 1986-1990	Succeeded by The electoral district was abolished in 1990.
Preceded by André Cardinal|André Cardinal (RCM)	City Councillor, District of Plateau-Mont-Royal; 1990-1994	Succeeded by André Cardinal|André Cardinal (RCM)
