= Élaine Ayotte =

Canadian politician and diplomat

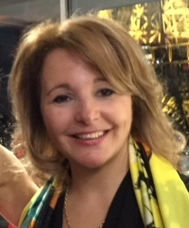

Montreal City Councillor for Marie-Victorin
- In office November 2009 – November 2013
- Preceded by: Carle Bernier-Genest
- Succeeded by: Guillaume Lavoie

Ambassador and Permanent Delegate of Canada to UNESCO
- Incumbent
- Assumed office May 4, 2015
- Preceded by: Jean-Pierre Blackburn

Personal details
- Party: Vision Montréal (2009-2013); Independent (2013)

Élaine Ayotte is a Canadian politician and diplomat. She obtained her Bachelor of Arts degree in Communications from the Université du Québec à Montréal in 1987. She then pursued a Master of Arts degree, also in Communications, at McGill University, which she completed in 1990.

Avotte was formerly a Montreal City Councillor for the Marie-Victorin ward in the borough of Rosemont–La Petite-Patrie from 2009 to 2013. She was appointed as Canada's ambassador and permanent delegate to UNESCO on May 4, 2015.

She was first elected in the 2009 municipal election as a member of the Vision Montréal party, defeating incumbent councillor Carle Bernier-Genest. She was appointed to the Montreal Executive Committee, with responsibility for culture, heritage and design, in November 2012. However, she left that caucus to sit as an independent councillor on June 4, 2013. She did not run for reelection in the 2013 municipal election.

Prior to her political career, Ayotte was a television journalist for TVA and TQS.
