= Our Generation (journal) =

Journal published in Canada

- Language: English
- Edited by: Dimitrios Roussopoulos

Publication details
- Former name: Our Generation Against Nuclear War
- History: 1961–1994

Standard abbreviations
- ISO 4: Our Gener.

Indexing
- ISSN: 0030-686X

Our Generation was an anarchist journal published in Montreal, Quebec, Canada from 1961 through 1994. It was edited, over the entire run, by Dimitrios Roussopoulos.

== History and profile ==
The magazine's original title was Our Generation Against Nuclear War, and its inaugural issue, in 1961, included an introduction by Bertrand Russell, and a mission statement: "devoted to the research, theory, and review of the problems of world peace and directed toward presenting alternative solutions to human conflict". The founders were members of the Montreal branch of the Combined Universities' Campaign of Nuclear Disarmament, established by McGill University students during the late 1950s. By the late 1960s the journal was turning towards anarchist solutions, and by the early 1970s it had become a journal of anarchism and libertarian socialism.

Our Generation ceased publication in 1994, after producing 24 volumes.

== See also ==
- List of anarchist periodicals
