= Dimitrios Roussopoulos =

Canadian activist and publisher (born 1936)

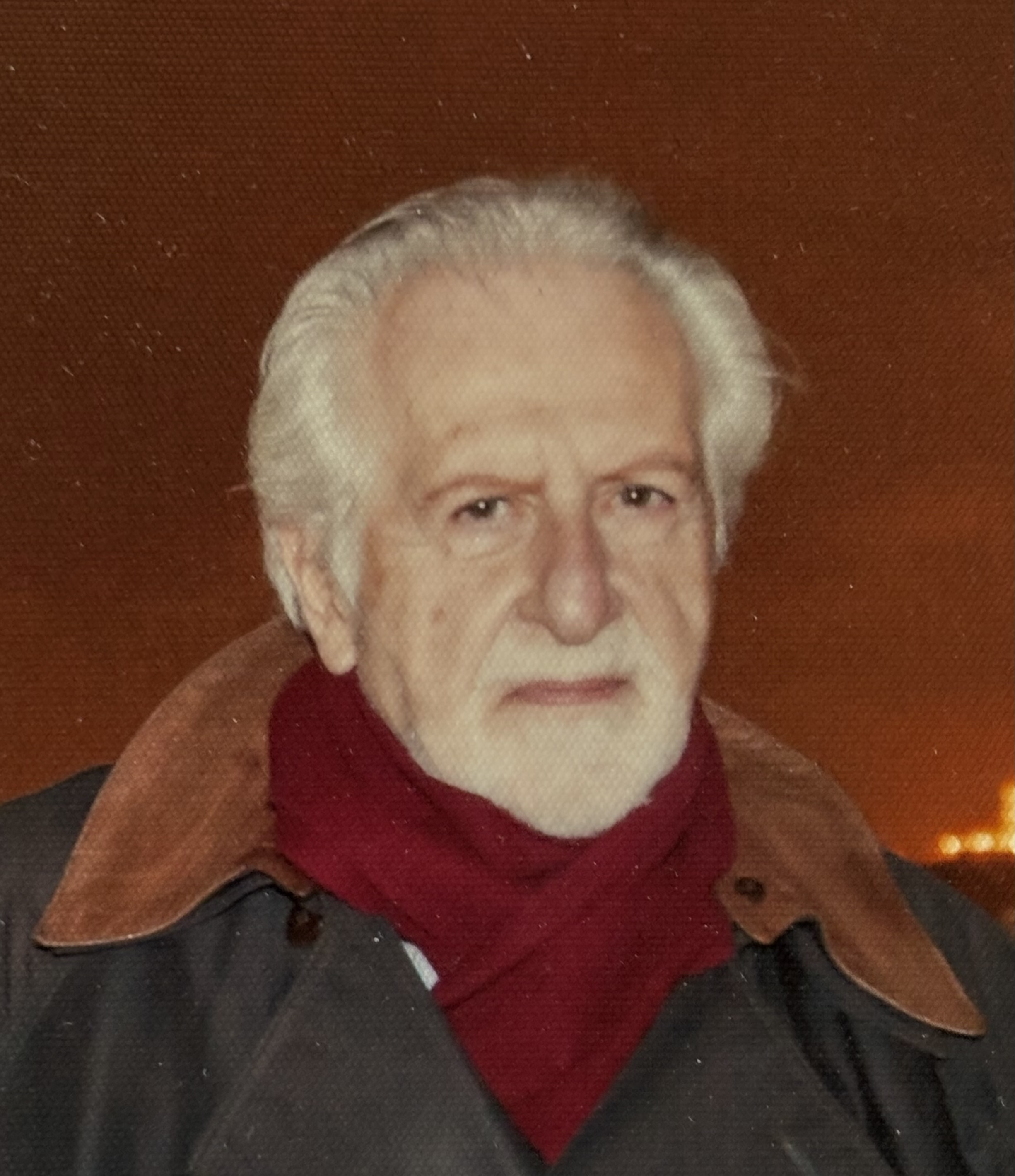
- Roussopoulos in Istanbul in 2025
- Born: Montreal, Canada

Dimitrios I. Roussopoulos (born 1936) is a Canadian political activist and publisher.

== Early life ==
Roussopoulos studied philosophy, politics, and economics at several Montreal and London universities, including McGill University and the London School of Economics. He turned down a $10,000 scholarship offer to pursue a PhD from the University of Chicago to instead pursue his political activism. He has remained institutionally independent apart from teaching two years in the late 1960s at a progressive college.

== Career ==
Roussopoulos’s political and peace activism began in London, England. He founded in 1959 the Combined Universities Campaign for Nuclear Disarmament and organized the first post-war student demonstration in Ottawa. He founded and edited Canada's first quarterly peace research journal, Our Generation, in 1961. Its first issue gained a circulation of three thousand and carried a preface by Bertrand Russell.

In 1969, Roussopoulos founded Black Rose Books, an international publishing house known for publishing works of left-wing politics by Noam Chomsky and Murray Bookchin, among others.

The first book he published was The New Left in Canada, 1969, which chronicled his experience as a major activist of the New Left in Canada in the 1960's.

In a 2021 interview, Roussopoulos stated that the mission of the publishing house was threefold: to disseminate ideas of participatory democracy and community organizing, to publish the best radical analysis of Canadian society, to revive libertarian socialist literature long suppressed on the left.

Since the 1970s, Roussopoulos has been active in radical municipalist community organizing in Montreal. He helped found the Milton-Park Citizens' Committee and contributed to a decade-long effort to prevent the destruction of a heritage six-city-block neighbourhood. The area was transformed into the largest non-profit cooperative housing project in North America, with some 1200 residents federated into 22 co-ops and non-profit housing associations on the first land trust in Canada, preventing all land speculation. Roussopoulos was a president of the University Settlement of Montreal, which sought to democratize and localize the neighbourhood economy and successfully launched a credit union, a public library, and a rooftop garden.

Roussopoulos was also an active member of the Montreal Citizens Movement from 1975 to 1978, in which he advocated for the democratic decentralization of City Hall's political power into decision-making Montreal neighbourhood councils, and social housing through non-profit cooperatives.

To advance libertarian municipalist ideas of social ecology, Roussopoulos founded Montréal Écologique (Ecology Montreal) in 1989, the first municipal green party in North America. With Serge Mongeau and Jacques Gelinas, Roussopoulos co-founded Les Editions Eco-Société in 1992. In the mid-1990s, together with Lucia Kowaluk, his life partner, he founded the Centre d'écologie urbaine de Montréal (Montreal Center for Urban Ecology). He later founded Société de développement communautaire de Montréal (Montreal Community Development Corporation), which incorporated the Centre d'écologie urbaine de Montréal, alongside Place Publique (Public Square), Groupe-ressource en éco-design (Eco-design Resource Group, and Démocratie municipale et citoyenneté (Municipal Democracy and Citizenship).

From 2001 to 2012, Dimitri Roussopoulos headed the Taskforce on Municipal Democracy of the City of Montreal, which proposed and drafted the Montreal Charter of Citizen Rights and Responsibilities, the first right-to-the-city charter in North America, which was later recognized by UNESCO. The Taskforce then adopted the first citizens' initiative for public consultation whereby petitioning citizens can obtain public consultations on issues on a wide range of public policy issues, a first in North America. Roussopoulos additionally organized five citizen summits (2001–2010) for bottom-up democracy, drawing together one thousand citizens and non-governmental organizations to advance a citizens' agenda for change.

In 2009, alongside Phyllis Lambert and Dinu Bumbaru, Roussopoulos founded the Institute of Policy Alternatives of Montreal, a think tank aiming to shed light on urban planning and development policy.

In 2012, he founded the Transnational Institute of Social Ecology, an Athens-based network of intellectuals and activists working in various cities in Europe.

In 2018, he co-curated the exhibition Milton-Parc: How We Did It, presented at the Canadian Centre for Architecture from September 2018 to March 2019. Currently, he serves as president of Communauté Saint-Urbain, a community project aiming to redevelop the heritage site Hôtel-Dieu de Montréal, such that the site preserves its important status in the community, while attending to the needs of local residents.

== Bibliography ==
=== English ===
- The Case for Participatory Democracy: Some Prospects for a Radical Society. Co-edited with C. George Benello, 1970
- The New Left in Canada. Edited by Dimitri Roussopoulos, 1970
- The Political Economy of the State – Canada, Quebec, United States. Edited by Dimitri Roussopoulos, 1973
- Canada and Radical Social Change. Edited by Dimitri Roussopoulos, 1973
- Quebec and Radical Social Change. Edited by Dimitri Roussopoulos, 1974
- City and Radical Social Change. Edited by Dimitri Roussopoulos, 1982
- Our Generation against Nuclear War. Edited by Dimitri Roussopoulos, 1983
- 1984 and After. Co-edited with Marsha Hewitt, 1984
- The Coming of World War Three. 1986
- Radical Papers, 1986, Radical Papers 2. 1987, edited by Dimitri Roussopoulos
- Anarchist Papers, 2001; Anarchist Papers 2. 1989; Anarchist Papers 3. 1990 edited by Dimitri Roussopoulos
- Dissidence – Essays against the Mainstream. 1992
- Political Ecology; Beyond Environmentalism. 1993
- Public Place – Citizen Participation in the Neighbourhood and the City, 1999
- Participatory Democracy: Prospects for Democratizing Democracy. Co-edited with C. George Benello, 2005
- The New Left – Legacy and Continuity. Edited by Dimitri Roussopoulos, 2007
- Faith in Faithlessness – An Anthology of Atheism. Edited by Dimitri Roussopoulos, 2008
- The Rise of Cities. Edited by and written by Dimitri Roussopoulos, 2012
- Villages in Cities: Community Land Ownership, Cooperative Housing, and the Milton Park Story. Co-edited with Joshua Hawley, 2019

=== French ===
- L'écologie politique – Au-delà de l'environnementalisme, 1994
- Au bout de l'Impasse à gauche – récits de vie militant et perspectives d'avenir, 2007

== See also ==
- Montréal Écologique
