= Jean Fortier =

Canadian politician

Jean E. Fortier is a Canadian politician and was a City Councillor from Montreal, Quebec.

== Professional career ==
Fortier worked in industrial and international financing for the Mercantile Bank, Barclay's, and ABB). He was also a consultant in international economic development (EEC, Madagascar, Micronesia, Tunisia).

== Education ==
Fortier has a baccalauréat en administration des affaires (B.A.A.) from the Hautes Études Commerciales (HEC) and a Master of Engineering from the École de Technologie Supérieure (ETS). His Master's thesis was entitled: "A Study on the Use of Activity-Based Management Principles and Parametric Estimation of Investment Budgetsof the City of Montreal."

== Municipal Politics ==
In 1998 he ran for a seat on the City Council under the Vision Montreal label in the district of Darlington. He won with 32% against incumbent Jack Chadirdjian (31%). He served as Montreal's Chairman of the Executive Committee from 1998 to 2001.

Fortier did not run for re-election in 2001, citing concerns about organized crime.

While in office, Fortier was "offered a bribe, blackmailed, pressured to shake down a city consultant to contribute to his political party, and even offered a chance to become the next mayor if he cooperated."

The attempted bribe was linked to developers with ties to organized crime. Fortier's warnings about organized crime infiltrating municipal operations were not taken seriously by his elected colleagues, but Fortier's concerns were a factor that ultimately helped establish the Charbonneau Commission on corruption in Quebec politics. Today, Fortier proposes procedures that could reduce the influence of organized crime, some as simple as rendering public full organizational flow charts, listing all municipal employees.

In 2013, Fortier worked with the campaign of mayoral candidate, Mélanie Joly, and her Vrai Changement Party, but he left before the end of the campaign. Fortier insists that, contrary to some rumours, he did not present himself as a candidate for mayor at that time.

On 20 September 2017, Fortier announced that he would run for mayor of Montreal in the 2017 Montreal municipal election for the Coalition Montreal party, because he believes Montrealers need a centrist option.

Fortier was excluded from most key debates during the election campaign, but participated in the bicycling debate against Marc-André Gadoury (Team Coderre) and Marianne Giguère (Projet Montréal). Fortier, who rides a bike 12 months a year, presented much more less costly proposals than his two rivals, advocating premiums for municipal employees who ride to work year-round, rendering the metro (subway) system more accessible to cyclists and putting bike racks on transit buses.

Fortier was critical of many big infrastructure projects, particularly the proposed Réseau électrique métropolitain (REM) train line and the Pink Line metro project, both officially costed at $6 billion. His alternative proposal is the "Ligne du Savoir," a relatively modest extension of the under-utilized Blue Line, bringing it under Mt. Royal and into downtown for about $1.5 billion.

Fortier also promised to cut property taxes by 10 percent over the four-year mandate and detailed plans to reduce overhead at City Hall without cutting blue collar workers.

He promised to make climate tests mandatory for many municipal purchases and procedures, allowing elected officials to make enlightened choices. This move went beyond what the Montreal Climate Coalition had been hoping for stated spokesman Matthew Chapman.

On October 18, 2017, he announced that he would abandon actively campaigning for mayor, endorsing rival candidate Valérie Plante of Projet Montréal for mayor. Fortier's name also appeared on the ballot as candidate for municipal councillor in the Peter McGill district. But Cathy Wong of the Coderre Team ultimately won that seat.

== Provincial Politics ==
In 2001 he considered running as a Parti Québécois candidate in a provincial by-election in the district of Labelle, but eventually abandoned that idea. Sylvain Pagé became the PQ nominee and won the election.

== Federal Politics ==
Fortier ran as a Conservative star candidate in the district of Ahuntsic in 2004. He finished fourth with 5% of the votes.

== Footnotes ==
Political offices
Preceded by Jack Chadirdjian (Independent)	City Councillor, District of Darlington; 1998-2001	Succeeded by Saulie Zajdel (Union Montreal)
Preceded by Noushig Eloyan (Vision Montreal)	Chairman of the Executive Committee; 1998-2001	Succeeded by Frank Zampino (Union Montreal)
