= Daniel Boucher (politician) =

Canadian politician

Daniel Boucher is a politician in Montreal, Quebec, Canada. He served on the Montreal city council from 1994 to 1998, originally as a member of Vision Montreal and later as an independent. Boucher has also sought election to the House of Commons of Canada and the National Assembly of Quebec.

== Early life and career ==
Boucher was a bus driver for a seniors' residence in the early 1990s. A Quebec sovereigntist, he was an early supporter of the Bloc Québécois in Canadian federal politics.

== Early bids for public office ==
While supporting the Bloc Québécois at the federal level, Boucher ran as a New Democratic Party of Quebec (NDP) candidate for a 1992 provincial by-election in the Montreal division of Anjou. (Former Front de libération du Québec militant Paul Rose had planned to seek the party's nomination for this contest, but could not do so as he was on parole from a life sentence for the murder of Quebec politician Pierre Laporte.) The Quebec NDP was not affiliated with the New Democratic Party of Canada in this period, and the federal party openly dissociated itself from the Quebec NDP during the by-election. Boucher finished a distant third against Parti Québécois candidate Pierre Bélanger.

Boucher later ran as a Bloc Québécois candidate in the 1993 Canadian federal election for the Montreal division of Papineau—Saint-Michel. Some pundits believed he had a reasonable chance of winning, though on election day he finished second against Liberal incumbent André Ouellet. Boucher was thirty-six years old during this election and identified as a social worker.

== Municipal politician ==
Boucher was elected to the Montreal city council in the 1994 municipal election as a candidate of Pierre Bourque's Vision Montreal party, defeating Montreal Citizens' Movement incumbent Micheline Daigle in the Jean-Rivard division. He served for the next two years as a backbench supporter of Bourque's administration and chaired the city's finance and economic development committee. In 1996, he shelved a proposal to charge full taxes on churches and religious institutions, arguing that he would wait for the provincial government's direction on the issue.

In an interview published by the Montreal Gazette on June 15, 1996, Boucher said that several members of Vision Montreal had concerns about the party's internal management and believed too much power was invested in the mayor and the Montreal executive committee. He added that he was not planning to resign from the party and that Bourque had been receptive to his criticism. Only ten days later, however, he and fellow councillor Hubert Deraspe left the party to sit as independents. In making this decision, Boucher remarked that "all the qualified people [had] left Vision Montreal" and that it was "a party in name only."

Boucher and Deraspe later accused Bourque of trying to buy the support of disgruntled councillors by introducing a council pay increase, and, when allegations surfaced about illegal fundraising by Vision Montreal, they sought to persuade Vision councillors to defect to the opposition. In January 1998, Boucher introduced a motion of censure against Bourque and executive committee chair Noushig Eloyan.

Also in January 1998, Boucher joined an informal opposition alliance called the Coalition for Montreal's Future, led by fellow ex-Vision councillor Sammy Forcillo. Boucher served as the group's critic for municipal services, with a focus on sports and leisure.

Boucher ran as an independent candidate in the 1998 municipal election and lost to Vision Montreal's Nicole Roy-Arcelin. He attempted to return to council in the 2001 election as a candidate of Gérald Tremblay's Montreal Island Citizens' Union, but lost to Vision candidate Frank Venneri.

== Electoral record ==
2001 Montreal municipal election: Councillor, Jean-Rivard
Party	Candidate	Votes	%
Vision Montreal	Frank Venneri (incumbent)	4,548	58.04
Montreal Island Citizens Union	Daniel Boucher	2,968	37.88
White Elephant Party	Charles Paradis	320	4.08
Total valid votes		7,836	100
Source: Election results, 1833-2005 (in French), City of Montreal.

1998 Montreal municipal election: Councillor, Jean-Rivard division
Party	Candidate	Votes	%
Vision Montreal	Nicole Roy-Arcelin	2,100	40.46
Independent	(x)Daniel Boucher	1,281	24.68
New Montreal	Claude Bricault	981	18.90
Team Montreal	Keder Hyppolite	505	9.73
Montreal Citizens' Movement	Solange Allen	323	6.22
Total valid votes		5,190	100
Source: Official Results, City of Montreal

1994 Montreal municipal election: Councillor, Jean-Rivard
Party	Candidate	Votes	%
Vision Montreal	Daniel Boucher	1,954	46.85
Montreal Citizens' Movement	Micheline Daigle (incumbent)	1,338	32.08
Montrealers' Party	Antoinette Corrado	672	16.11
Democratic Coalition–Ecology Montreal	Pietro Bozzo	207	4.96
Total valid votes		4,171	100
Source: Official Results, City of Montreal

1993 Canadian federal election: Papineau—Saint-Michel
Party	Candidate	Votes	%	±%	Expenditures
Liberal	André Ouellet	20,064	51.98	+5.99	$41,411
Bloc Québécois	Daniel Boucher	15,148	39.24		$18,649
Progressive Conservative	Carmen de Pontbriand	1,686	4.37	−28.86	$26,388a
New Democratic Party	Gisèle Charlebois	708	1.83	−13.27	$477
Natural Law	André Beaudoin	678	1.76		$386
Marxist-Leninist	Serge Lachapelle	141	0.37	−0.12	$80
Abolitionist	P.A. D'Aoust	98	0.25		$0
Commonwealth	Normand Normandeau	78	0.20	−0.24	$0
Total valid votes		38,601	100.00		
Total rejected ballots		1,241			
Turnout		39,842	75.45	+5.31	
Electors on the lists		52,808			
a Does not include unpaid claims. Source: Thirty-fifth General Election, 1993: Official Voting Results, Published by the Chief Electoral Officer of Canada. Financial figures taken from the official contributions and expenses submitted by the candidates, provided by Elections Canada.

Quebec provincial by-election, January 20, 1992: Anjou
Party	Candidate	Votes	%
Parti Québécois	Pierre Bélanger	8,619	52.14
Liberal	Charlotte Goudreault	7,342	44.41
New Democratic	Daniel Boucher	283	1.71
Independent	Patrice Fortin	143	0.87
United Social Credit	Emilien Martel	61	0.37
N/A (Communist League)	Michel Prairie	45	0.27
Independent	Jolly Taylor	38	0.23
Total valid votes		16,531	98.73
Total rejected ballots		213	1.27
Turnout		16,744	57.65
Electors		29,043	
Source: Official Results, Le Directeur général des élections du Québec.
