= Michael Fainstat =

Canadian politician

Michael Fainstat (29 August 1923 – 29 December 2010) was a Canadian politician and a city councillor in Montreal, Quebec.

== Background ==
In the early seventies Fainstat became a founding member of the progressive Montreal Citizens' Movement, also known as Rassemblement des citoyens et citoyennes de Montréal (RCM) in French.

== City councillor ==
Fainstat was elected to Montreal's city council in 1974 against Civic incumbent James Bellin with 17 other RCM candidates, and represented the district of Notre-Dame-de-Grâce.

He was the only RCM candidate to win a seat in 1978. He was re-elected in the district of La-Confédération in 1982 and 1986.

== Chairman of the executive committee ==
Fainstat served as Montreal's chairman of the executive committee from 1986 to 1990.

He was re-elected in the district of Notre-Dame-de-Grâce in 1990, but resigned in 1991. He was succeeded by Democratic Coalition candidate Claudette Demers-Godley on the city council.

== Death ==
Fainstat died on December 29, 2010, due to Parkinson's disease. A commemoration of his life was held on January 9, 2011.

== Footnotes ==
Political offices
| Preceded by Yvon Lamarre (Civic Party) | Chairman of the Executive Committee; 1986–1990 | Succeeded by Léa Cousineau (RCM) |
| Preceded by Arnold Bennett (RCM) | City Councillor, District of Notre-Dame-de-Grâce; 1990–1991 | Succeeded by Claudette Demers-Godley (Democratic Coalition) |
