= Alain André =

Canadian politician

Alain André is a lawyer, a university and college law professor, a Canadian politician and a former City Councillor in Montreal, Quebec.

André's legal specialty is criminal law. As a professor, he taught at the University of Quebec in Montreal. He currently teaches law in the police and correctional technology programs at John Abbott College in Sainte-Anne-de-Bellevue, near Montreal.

Before running for office, André was a political attaché and administrative assistant to Yvon Lamarre, chairman of Montreal's executive committee during the time of Mayor Jean Drapeau.

André was the founder and leader of the Parti Municipal (Municipal Party), a Montreal political party that competed with the Civic Party of Montreal for the right of centre vote and official opposition status from 1989 to 1992. He first attempted to join the Montreal City Council in a 1989 by-election in the district of Sault-au-Récollet. He secured 39% of the vote, losing to the Civic candidate, Serge Sauvageau, by a margin of 1%.

In 1990, he finished third in the mayoral election with only 10% of the vote, but was elected city Councillor for the district of Ahuntsic with 38% of the vote, and became Leader of the Opposition. However, the Parti Municipal suffered a number of defections in favour of the Civic Party, and by 1991, the Democratic Coalition of Montreal temporarily became the Official Opposition. The Parti Municipal soon merged with the Civic Party, and André sat as a Civic Council member.

André decided not to compete in the city council election of 1994 following a false accusation of sexual assault. In the light of the findings of a private investigation commissioned by André, the crown prosecutor dropped all the charges against him. André sued the crown and the police department for accusing him without having properly investigated the alleged charges. In 1999, the city of Montreal, as the police employer, was condemned by the Quebec Court of Appeal for wrongful arrest and ordered to pay André and his wife, Lorraine Drouin, $366,800 plus costs and interest a total amount of nearly $700,000.

In 2005, André ran as a candidate for the city council in the Saint-Sulpice district as the Vision Montreal candidate, but he was defeated by Jocelyn Ann Campbell of UCIM (later renamed as Union Montreal).

== Footnotes ==
Political offices
| Preceded by Pierre Bastien (RCM) | City Councillor, District of Ahuntsic; 1990-1994 | Succeeded by Hasmig Belleli (Vision Montreal) |
