= Loyola (Montreal) =

Coordinates: 45.463°N 73.647°W

Loyola is a residential district of the Borough Côte-des-Neiges—Notre-Dame-de-Grâce within the City of Montreal, Quebec, Canada. It is one of five districts of the borough. In 2017, it had a population of 35,693 of which only 18% spoke French in the home.
