= Comité de déontologie policière =

The Comité de déontologie policière (French pronunciation: [kɔmite də deɔ̃tɔlɔʒi pɔlisjɛʁ], Quebec Police Ethics Committee) is an organization of members appointed by the Government of Quebec to review ethics charges against police officers and other public officials subject to the provincial code of police ethics.

The committee is one of two institutions created on September 1, 1990, by the Loi sur l'Organisation policière, along with the Commissaire à la déontologie policière, which conducts initial investigations into ethics complaints. If the commissaire decides the ethics code was violated, the official(s) involved will be summoned to appear before the committee for a case review. It can impose sanctions if it determines an ethics violation has occurred.

Before this two-tier review system was introduced, the Quebec Police Commission heard complaints but could not punish offenders.

The committee was initially divided into three divisions, for the Montreal Urban Community, Sûreté du Québec, and remaining municipal police boards.
