= Léa Cousineau =

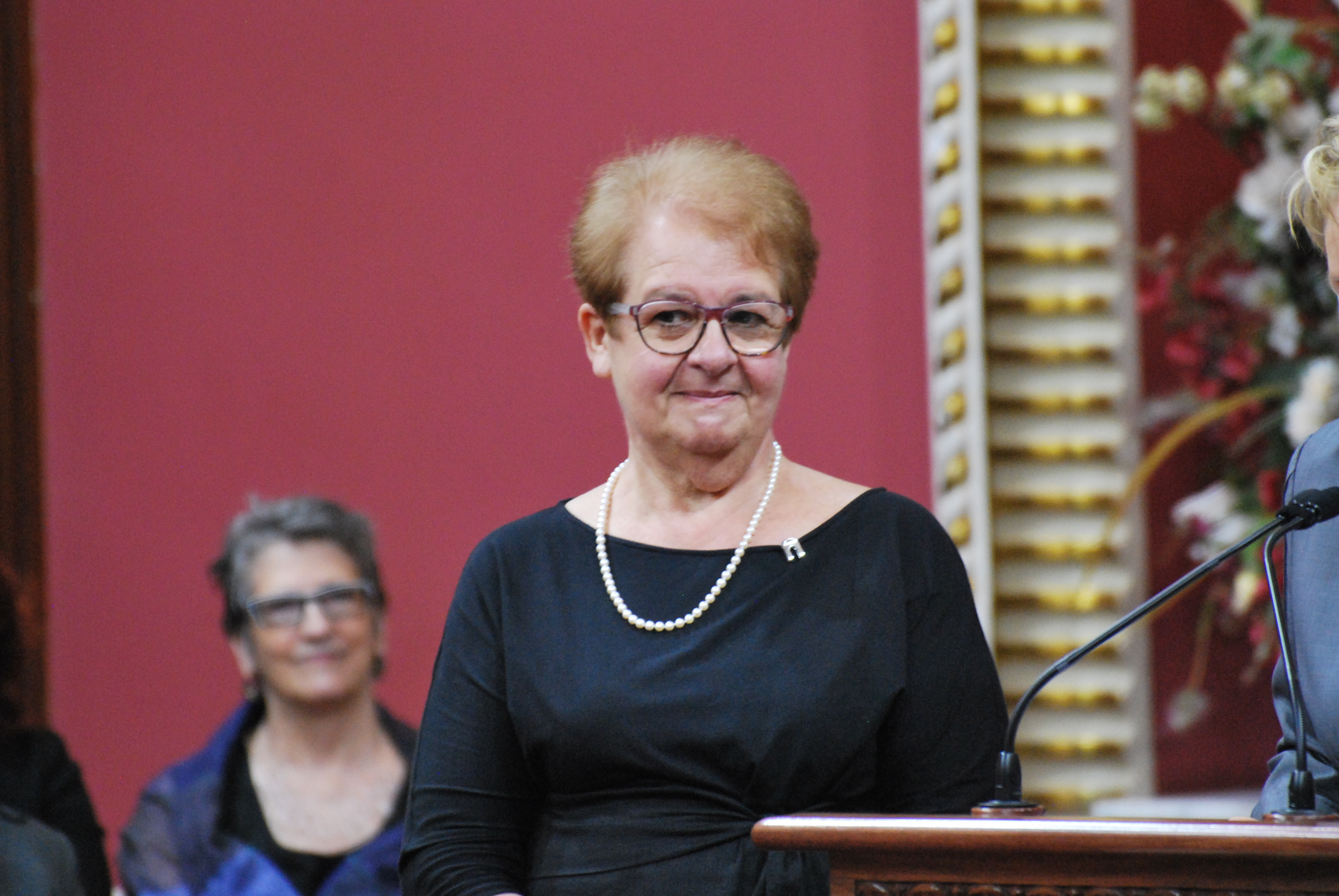
Léa Cousineau in 2013

Léa Cousineau was a Canadian politician and a City Councillor in Montreal, Quebec.

== RCM Activist ==
In the early seventies she became a founding member and the President of the progressive Montreal Citizens' Movement, also known as Rassemblement des citoyens et citoyennes de Montréal (RCM) in French.

She ran as an RCM candidate to Montreal's City Council in the district of Rosemont in 1974, but lost against Civic incumbent Jean Trottier.

== City Councillor ==
Cousineau ran again in 1986 in the district of Étienne-Desmarteau and won. She was re-elected in 1990, but was defeated in 1994.

From 1986 to 1990, she was the Chairperson of Montreal's executive committee.

== Footnotes ==
Political offices
Preceded by Jean Malouf (Civic Party)	City Councillor, District of Étienne-Desmarteau; 1986-1994	Succeeded by Michelle Daines (Vision Montreal)
Preceded by Michael Fainstat (RCM)	Chairperson of the Executive Committee; 1990-1994	Succeeded by Noushig Eloyan (Vision Montreal)
