= Villeray—Saint-Michel—Parc-Extension borough council =

The Villeray—Saint-Michel—Parc-Extension borough council is the local governing body of Villeray—Saint-Michel—Parc-Extension, a borough in the City of Montreal. The council consists of five members: the borough mayor (who also serves as a Montreal city councillor) and four city councillors who are elected for the borough's four districts.

Villeray–Saint-Michel–Parc-Extension within the City of Montreal.

== Current members ==
- Borough mayor: Jean-François Lalonde
- Montreal city councillor, Saint-Michel division: Josué Corvil
- Montreal city councillor, François-Perrault division: Sylvain Ouellet
- Montreal city councillor, Villeray division: Martine Musau Muele
- Montreal city councillor, Parc-Extension division: Elvira Carhuallanqui
