= Carle Bernier-Genest =

Canadian politician

Montreal City Councillor for Marie-Victorin
- In office 2006–2009
- Preceded by: Pierre Bourque
- Succeeded by: Élaine Ayotte

Personal details
- Party: Montreal Island Citizens Union

Carle Bernier-Genest is a Canadian politician, who was a Montreal City Councillor for the Marie-Victorin ward in the borough of Rosemont–La Petite-Patrie from 2006 to 2009.

Bernier-Genest first ran in the 2005 municipal election, but lost narrowly to Pierre Bourque. Following Bourque's resignation as a city councillor in 2006, Bernier-Genest was elected in the resulting by-election on September 25, 2006, but was subsequently defeated by Élaine Ayotte in the 2009 election as part of a borough-wide swing toward the opposition Vision Montréal party.

Openly gay, Bernier-Genest has been an active volunteer in Montreal's LGBT and youth communities, including as a past president of the LGBT youth group Jeunesse Lambda and as a board member of the telephone support line Gai Écoute, the Forum jeunesse de l'Île de Montréal and Divers/Cité. In 2004, he was awarded the Jeune Bénévole — Prix Claude Masson, a prize granted by the government of Quebec to distinguished young volunteers in the province.
