= Pierre-Yves Melançon =

Pierre-Yves Melançon is a Canadian politician and a City Councillor in Montreal, Quebec.

== Background ==
He holds a degree in political science.

== City Councillor ==
Melançon was a member of the Montreal Citizens' Movement (French: Rassemblement des citoyens et des citoyennes de Montréal or RCM).

He successfully ran as City Councillor in the district of Mont-Royal in 1982. He was re-elected in 1986. Disappointed with the party's gradual shift to the center, he quit the RCM. In December 1989, with three other councillors, he founded the Democratic Coalition of Montreal (French: Coalition démocratique de Montréal or CDM).

== Mayoral Candidate ==
In 1990, he was the mayoral candidate for the Democratic Coalition and the council candidate for the Côte-des-Neiges. He lost both races. In June 1992 he left the Coalition.

== Political Comeback ==
In 1994 he was re-elected to the City Council as a Vision Montreal candidate, representing the district of Côte-des-Neiges. He was re-elected in 1998, but lost re-election in 2001 against Francine Sénécal.

== Retirement from Political Office ==
Melançon has been vice-president of Vision Montréal since 2006.

== Footnotes ==
Political offices
| Preceded by Edmond Synnott (Civic Party) | City Councillor, Mont-Royal; 1982-1990 | Succeeded by The district was abolished in 1990. |
| Preceded by Abe Limonchik (RCM) | City Councillor, Côte-des-Neiges; 1994-2001 | Succeeded by Francine Sénécal (Union Montreal) |
