= Mercier–Hochelaga-Maisonneuve borough council =

The Mercier–Hochelaga-Maisonneuve borough council is the local governing body of Mercier–Hochelaga-Maisonneuve, a borough in the City of Montreal. The council consists of five members: the borough mayor (who also serves as a Montreal city councillor) and the city council representatives for each of the borough's four electoral districts.

Mercier–Hochelaga-Maisonneuve is known as a bastion of support for the Vision Montreal party.

== Current members ==
District	Position	Name	Party
—	Borough mayor City councillor	Chantal Gagnon	Ensemble Montréal - Équipe Soraya
Hochelaga	City councillor	Sarah V. Doyon	Projet Montréal
Louis-Riel	City councillor	Alba Stella Zuniga Ramos	Ensemble Montréal - Équipe Soraya
Maisonneuve–Longue-Pointe	City councillor	Alexandre Devaux-Guizani	Ensemble Montréal - Équipe Soraya
Tétreaultville	City councillor	Julien Hénault-Ratelle	Ensemble Montréal - Équipe Soraya

Laurent Blanchard was a member of the borough council until his selection as mayor of Montreal in June 2013.
