= Jeremy Searle =

Canadian politician (1953–2025)

Montreal City Councillor for Loyola
- In office 22 November 2013 – 5 November 2017

Personal details
- Born: 18 February 1953 Bristol, England
- Died: 25 October 2025 (aged 72)
- Party: Independent (2013–2017)

Jeremy Searle (18 February 1953 – 25 October 2025) was a Canadian politician who was a Montréal city councillor in the Côte-des-Neiges–Notre-Dame-de-Grâce district of Loyola. He was the city councillor for Loyola district from 1994 to 2005, and from 2013 to 2017. He was defeated in the municipal elections of 5 November 2017. The Montreal Gazette summarized his second term and his defeat thus: 'Also of note was the distant third-place showing in Loyola of councillor Jeremy Searle, whose last term was marked by erratic behaviour during borough meetings, when he appeared to be drunk, and for controversial remarks that were viewed by many to be anti-Semitic'.

== Pedestrian safety ==
Searle conceived of a citywide Pedestrian and Traffic Safety Reeducation Plan in 2001. In response to his work for the city he was made head of the Transport Commission from 2001 to 2003. Searle conducted research, sensitized people, created new cross walk designs and held popular public consultations where he addressed all sorts of issues from parking restrictions to the introduction of red light cameras.

In the course of Searle's time as head of the Transport Commission during 2003, he proposed the provincial-wide law to make smoking in taxi cabs illegal. This law was soon implemented.

== 'Jewish guilt' comments ==
During a council debate over a proposed housing project, Searle railed against the "Jewish guilt approach" he alleged was being used to force the project. "The Jewish guilt approach, we see a lot. Not as much as we used to, that's when an argument is put forward without foundation, the notion being because we said it's Jewish, we can't say anything against it," he was recorded as saying. "It's a role taken on by the Jewish community and used for all its worth."

During the 2017 Montreal municipal election, Searle was asked about his "Jewish Guilt" comments in an email from a constituent on 15 October 2017. He reacted with angry emails to the constituent, by calling the constituent at 4:00 AM (EDT), and leaving voicemails (one of which was reproduced on YouTube and replayed on local TV news) for him in which he accused the constituent of being a "fascist," working for the Chabad, and being part of a conspiracy to undermine his re-election campaign.

On 20 April 2023, Searle reiterated his Jewish guilt remarks while running for election to Pointe Claire city council in a by-election.

"I simply told the rabbi off and told him that we had gotten past all that and the Jewish guilt argument is old and finished," he said. "Get over it. It doesn't matter whether it is Jewish or Iranian or Arabic or whatever," then added "That's why I make the 'You can't use the Jewish guilt argument' thing."

== Other ==
In 1984 Searle started the campaign to block a controversial $130-million project which involved the city (Mayor Jean Drapeau) and Cadillac Fairview erecting a three-storey galleria on the corner of McGill College Avenue at De Maisonneuve Boulevard ultimately blocking access to the street and obstructing views of Mount Royal. Searle at the head of the campaign, called for "An independent, open and responsible consultation process." He collected 13 000 signatures on a petition and distributed a bilingual request at Montreal City Hall. The plan was ultimately abandoned due to disagreements between developers and critics of the project.

Searle was a key figure in 1985 for preventing the expansion plan of the Montreal Museum of Fine Arts from destroying Crescent Street, the largest agglomeration of surviving Victorian houses in North America. He was staunchly opposed to the combined expansion of the Montreal Museum of Fine Arts with a new Bell Canada head office which would have destroyed the majority of Montreal's iconic Bishop Street and Crescent Street.

With Searle leading the charge, the project was eventually rejected in 1986 due to disagreements between the city, museum board members and Bell Canada's desire to install 60 boutiques on the ground floor of their future head office.

== Death ==
Searle died on 25 October 2025, at the age of 72.
