= Montréal Écologique =

Municipal political party in Canada

Ecology Montreal Montréal Écologique
- Leader: Dimitri Roussopoulos
- Founded: April 1990
- Dissolved: August 1994
- Merged into: Coalition Démocratique–Montréal Écologique
- Ideology: Libertarian municipalism Social ecology Populism
- Political position: Left-wing
- Colours: Green

Montréal Écologique (French pronunciation: [mɔ̃ʁeal ekɔlɔʒik], MÉ; English: Ecology Montreal) was a municipal political party that existed from 1990 to 1994 in Montreal, Quebec, Canada. The party's ideas were influenced by political theorist Murray Bookchin's idea of libertarian municipalism.

== Origins ==
The party that eventually became Ecology Montreal was started in 1989 through a series of public meetings organized by Dimitri Roussopoulos, a veteran political organizer and publisher in Montreal. Roussopoulos indicated that his group was intended to become Montreal's first municipal Green party and would make environmental issues its top priority. Ecology Montreal was formally registered with city hall in April 1990.

The party was established at about the same time as the Democratic Coalition of Montreal, a left-wing breakaway group from the governing Montreal Citizens' Movement (MCM). Roussopoulos held talks with Democratic Coalition leaders on inter-party co-operation in late 1989, although no agreement was reached at that time. In October 1990, the parties signed a "non-aggression pact," pledging not to run against one another in most of the city's council wards in the upcoming election. As a result of the pact, Ecology Montreal did not field a candidate for mayor.

== 1990 election ==
Ecology Montreal's platform for the 1990 municipal election included calls for reducing automobile use, increasing green space, a full recycling program, proportional representation, and a toll for cars entering the Island of Montreal with fewer than three people. During the election, Roussopoulos said that Montreal should reduce its garbage output by seventy per cent. Some party members also pledged to set up a food bank after the election, expressing surprise at the degree of poverty in the city.

Ecology Montreal ran twenty-one candidates in the 1990 election, none of whom were elected. Roussopoulos finished second to an MCM candidate in the Jeanne-Mance ward.

== Merger ==
Roussopoulos remained as leader of Ecology Montreal until August 1994, when the party was formally merged with the Democratic Coalition. Yolande Cohen became leader of the resulting Democratic Coalition-Ecology Montreal party for the 1994 election. Before the merger, the party had attempted to form "Alliance '94", a political alliance with two other leftist city councillors.

The merged party won two seats on council, both of whom were former members of the Democratic Coalition. These councillors used the name of the merged party until shortly before the 1998 election, when the parties dissolved their merger. Ecology Montreal does not appear to have re-surfaced as a separate organization after this time.
