= Coalition démocratique de Montréal =

Political party in Montreal, Quebec, Canada

The Coalition démocratique de Montréal (English: Democratic Coalition of Montreal) was a left-of-centre municipal political party that existed in Montreal, Quebec, Canada, from 1989 to 2001.

== History ==
=== Formation and 1990 election ===
The Democratic Coalition was launched on December 21, 1989, by Marvin Rotrand, Sam Boskey, Pierre-Yves Melançon and Pierre Goyer. All four were sitting members of the Montreal city council who had previously left the governing Montreal Citizens' Movement (MCM), on the grounds that it had abandoned its progressive roots and commitment to open government. Melançon was chosen as the party's first interim leader. The party was officially recognized by the province of Quebec on March 8, 1990.

The Democratic Coalition campaigned on a strong environmental platform in the 1990 municipal election, while also supporting proportional representation and renewed investment in public transit. The party operated in a partial alliance with another newly formed party called Ecology Montreal, such that the two parties did not field candidates against one another in the mayoralty race or most council districts. The Democratic Coalition ultimately contested approximately half the available council seats, and Melançon was its candidate for mayor. The party openly acknowledged it was unlikely to form government: in the middle of the campaign, Melançon remarked, "Everybody says that [Montreal mayor] Jean Doré will be re-elected, but what really matters is who will form the official opposition."

The MCM ultimately won a second consecutive landslide victory in the 1990 election. Melançon finished fourth in the mayoral contest and was also defeated in his bid for re-election to council. Rotrand, Boskey, and Goyer were all re-elected, although no other Democratic Coalition candidates were returned. Boskey subsequently succeeded Melançon as the party's leader.

=== Post-election changes and party split ===
The Democratic Coalition subsequently became the official opposition on council after their candidate Claudette Demers-Godley won a dramatic by-election victory on November 3, 1991. Sam Boskey became leader of the opposition, a position that he held until March 16, 1992, when the rival Civic Party of Montreal increased its council membership to five seats via defections.

The Democratic Coalition split in June 1992, with Goyer and Demers-Godley resigning from the party to sit as independents. Goyer argued that the party had become dominated by Montreal's anglophone interests; Demers-Godley rejected this claim but argued that the party's leadership did not tolerate differences of opinion. Rotrand and Boskey continued to serve as Democratic Coalition councillors, but party never attained the same levels of popular support after this time.

Notwithstanding these setbacks, the Democratic Coalition once again became the official opposition on council in early February 1994, when the Civic Party effectively collapsed and most of its members resigned to serve as independents. Boskey again served as opposition leader until May 16, when eight independent opposition councillors were recognized as members of the newly formed Vision Montreal party.

=== Merger and 1994 election ===
The Democratic Coalition merged with Ecology Montreal in 1994 to create a new party called Democratic Coalition–Ecology Montreal. Boskey and Rotrand were re-elected to council under the new party's banner in the 1994 municipal election, but no other party candidates were returned. Yolande Cohen, the new party's mayoral candidate, finished fourth against Vision Montreal's Pierre Bourque.

The party retained the "Democratic Coalition–Montreal Ecology" name for the next four years, but the Montreal Ecology group became largely dormant, and for all intents and purposes Boskey and Rotrand continued to serve as Democratic Coalition councillors. On March 22, 1998, the two parties announced that they would dissolve their union.

=== 1998 election and aftermath ===
After splitting from Ecology Montreal, the Democratic Coalition entered into talks for co-operation with the Montreal Citizens' Movement (which by this time was no longer in government) in order to prevent a split in the left-of-center vote. These talks were ultimately unsuccessful.

The Democratic Coalition did not field a mayoral candidate in the 1998 municipal election, and instead focused its resources on council races in fewer than half of the city's wards. Despite the lack of a formal agreement, the party chose not to challenge some progressive MCM incumbents. Rotrand was re-elected to another term on council, but Boskey was narrowly defeated. Once again, no other party candidates were elected.

In August 2001, Rotrand announced that the Democratic Coalition would merge into the Montreal Island Citizens Union (MICU). He acknowledged that the party would probably not have survived the next election on its own.
