= Parti des Montréalais =

Political Party

The Parti des Montréalais (English: Montrealers' Party) was a municipal political party in Montreal, Quebec, Canada. It existed from 1993 to 1995 and won two council seats in the 1994 municipal election.

== Origins ==
Former provincial cabinet minister Jérôme Choquette launched the Parti des Montréalais after resigning from the Civic Party of Montreal in October 1993. Choquette had been a candidate for the Civic Party leadership, but withdrew from the contest charging that it was skewed in favour of rival candidate Clement Bluteau. As the Parti des Montréalais's leader, Choquette was also its candidate for mayor in 1994.

Two other parties merged into the Parti des Montréalais before the 1994 election. Bluteau won the Civic Party leadership after Choquette's withdrawal but himself resigned the following year amid continued inter-party turmoil. Unable to find a successor, the remnants of the Civic Party merged into Choquette's organization in August 1994. The Parti des Montréalais also received outside support from veteran councillor Nick Auf der Maur, who ran as an independent but supported Choquette's bid for the mayoralty.

Three sitting councillors, Pasquale Compierchio, Gérard Legault, and Fiorino Bianco, joined the Parti des Montréalais in the buildup to the 1994 election.

== Ideology ==
When he launched the Parti des Montréalais, Choquette pledged to eliminate Montreal's non-residential surtax and replace it with a business tax. When the party announced its first nominated candidates for council in March 1994, the two most prominent figures were veterans of a local anti-tax campaign. Choquette also indicated that his party would encourage more English and French bilingual signs to encourage tourism and prevent anglophones from leaving the city. In May 1994, he proposed eliminating the unelected position of city manager on the grounds that the office was too powerful.

Choquette promised in June 1994 that he would support car ownership if elected as mayor. Describing the car as "a means for man to manifest his freedom," he said that Montrealers had heard too many warnings about air pollution, traffic congestion, and the advantages of alternative transportation. He promised to remove existing bicycle lanes from major streets, reduce parking fines, increase the number of downtown parking lots, permit on-street downtown parking on weekends and evenings, and eliminate some reserved bus routes that he believed would "hurt commercial activity and cause traffic problems." A subsequent Montreal Gazette editorial described Choquette's proposals as "madness" and argued they would "downgrade the quality of life in neighborhoods," while incumbent mayor Jean Doré described Choquette's plan as "a philosophy of the '60s." Choquette responded with letter to the Gazette, in which he argued that he was not opposed in principle to bicycle lanes and would attempt to better integrate the city's automobile and bicycle traffic on "appropriate streets."

Choquette also promised to close Montreal's Miron quarry landfill and, as a short-term solution to the city's trash problems, ship its garbage to "outlying areas." He criticized the recommendations of a Montreal Urban Community task force on this issue as overly focused on a "three R's" strategy of reduction, reuse, and recycling.

In September 1994, Choquette promised to remove $600 million from Montreal's budget by cutting jobs and salaries, eliminating public consultation forums, and possibly adding toll booths to the island's bridges. At a subsequent press conference, he promised a 10 per cent pay cut for all councillors. On the latter occasion, he described himself as influenced by Ralph Klein's government in Alberta.

While the Parti des Montréalais was generally regarded as right-wing, it included in its ranks some progressives such as Jeremy Searle. The party's platform included some progressive social measures, such as a proposal to allow low-income tenants to purchase their apartments as co-operatives.

== 1994 election results ==
Choquette finished a distant third in the 1994 mayoral contest, receiving about 13% of the popular vote. All three of Parti des Montréalais's incumbent councillors were defeated, while only two party candidates were elected: Searle in the Loyola division and Michael Applebaum in Notre-Dame-de-Grâce. When the news of his party's defeat was reported, Choquette remarked that voters "preferred a dream to reality."

== Aftermath ==
Searle and Applebaum resigned from the party to sit as independents on April 3, 1995; Searle indicated that both he and Applebaum had been excluded from party planning. Choquette pledged later in the same month that he would continue to lead the debt-ridden party, but, on May 9, 1995, he formally asked Quebec's chief election official to dissolve the organization. One of party's candidates, Frank Venneri, remarked at around this time that questionable financial strategies had doomed it from the beginning.
