= Parti municipal de Montréal =

The Parti municipal de Montréal (PMM) (English: Montreal Municipal Party) was a municipal political party in Montreal, Quebec, Canada from 1987 to 1994.

== Emergence (1987–90) ==
The Parti municipal de Montréal was created in October 1987, when ten people met at a downtown Montreal hotel for its inaugural meeting. Alain André was chosen as the party's leader and its official colours were designated as turquoise and grey. Two months later, the party was officially registered at city hall.

The PMM was an obscure organization during its first year, having no official platform and very little money. It first came to the public's attention in April 1989, when André ran in a council by-election in the Sault-au-Recollet ward and finished only twenty-five votes behind the winning candidate, the attorney Serge Sauvageau, a newcomer in politics. Two months later, PMM candidate Stavros Zagakos won an upset victory in a by-election in Parc-Extension, in Montreal's Greek neighbourhood.

During this period, the Montreal Citizens' Movement (MCM), a party with social democratic origins, was the dominant municipal political force in Montreal. The MCM won a landslide victory in the 1986 election, taking the mayor's office and all but three of the fifty-eight seats on council. The formerly dominant Civic Party of Montreal of Jean Drapeau fell to only one seat; it later gained two more through by-elections and defections but subsequently fell victim to factional infighting. When the PMM emerged as a credible political force, some speculated that it would either merge with or replace the Civic Party to form a united conservative opposition.

The PMM's presence on council grew throughout 1989 and 1990. Civic Party councillors Nick Auf der Maur and Serge Sauvageau joined in November 1989, having become estranged from their former party's leadership. Former MCM councillor Frank Venneri also joined in the same month, saying the governing party had "lost the common touch." Another former MCM councillor, Pierre Bastien, joined in April 1990. The PMM became the official opposition party through these defections, and Auf der Maur served as the party's leader on council.

The PMM and Civic Party held merger talks in 1990, which André broke off after concluding that unity between the parties was impossible. Shortly thereafter, he was formally chosen as the PMM's mayoral candidate for the 1990 municipal election. The party held its first policy convention in August 1990, and supported such measures as tax increase deferrals for the elderly, a requirement for all new city employees to live in Montreal, and the creation of a special by-law enforcement unit.

== 1990 election ==
In addition to André's mayoral bid, the PMM ran fifty-seven council candidates in 1990 election. One of its key election promises was to lift a moratorium on converting apartments to condominiums; an article in the Montreal Gazette described the party as being centered around former Civic Party stalwarts.

The MCM won another landslide majority on election day, while the PMM fell to only three council seats: those of André, Auf der Maur, and newcomer Pierre Gagnier. André finished a distant third in the mayoral contest, and all of the party's other incumbents were defeated. The party remained the official opposition on council after the election.

== Decline (1990–94) ==
The PMM was destroyed by internal divisions after the 1990 election. Several members of the party's strategy committee resigned in May 1991, criticizing André's leadership. Later in the year, Auf der Maur left the PMM to rejoin the Civic Party, and Gagnier left to sit as an independent. André resigned as party leader on January 27, 1992, saying he was acting for the good of the party; he was replaced on an interim basis by Claude Lachapelle.

The PMM announced plans to merge with the Civic Party in June 1992, and André indicated that he would join the Civic Party group on council. The party merger was delayed, however, and André technically remained a PMM councillor until leaving to sit as an independent in January 1994. The PMM ceased to exist after this time.
