= Jean Doré =

Canadian politician

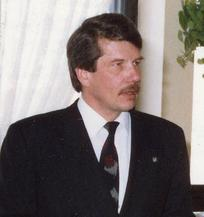
- Jean Doré in 1990

39th Mayor of Montreal
- In office November 9, 1986 – November 6, 1994
- Preceded by: Jean Drapeau
- Succeeded by: Pierre Bourque
- Constituency: Saint-Jean-Baptiste

Personal details
- Born: 12 December 1944 Montreal, Quebec
- Died: 15 June 2015 (aged 70) Montreal, Quebec
- Party: Montreal Citizens' Movement (MCM)
- Spouse: Christiane Sauvé
- Education: Université de Montréal

Jean Doré (French pronunciation: [ʒɑ̃ dɔʁe]; 12 December 1944 – 15 June 2015) was a Canadian politician and mayor of the City of Montreal, Quebec.

== Background ==
Doré studied law at the Université de Montréal, where he was president of the student union from 1967 to 1968. He received a Master's Degree of Political Science from McGill University. In the early seventies Doré became a founding member of the progressive Montreal Citizens' Movement (MCM), also known as Rassemblement des citoyens et citoyennes de Montréal (RCM) in French, where he started as treasurer and eventually became party leader in 1982.

From 1972 to 1975, Doré was director of the Fédération des associations d'économie familiale. He hosted a consumer affairs show on the Radio-Québec public television network. He was briefly a press attaché for René Lévesque who would later become Premier of Quebec. Prior to his mayoral tenure, Doré worked as a lawyer for the Confédération des syndicats nationaux (CSN) - the Confederation of National Trade Unions (CNTU).

== Leader of the Opposition ==
In 1982 Doré was selected as the MCM candidate for Mayor of Montreal. He finished second with 36% of the vote, against incumbent Jean Drapeau (48%), giving Drapeau his stiffest competition in years. Fifteen candidates of the MCM were elected to City Hall. Doré won a by-election in 1984 and became city councillor for the district of Saint-Jean-Baptiste, as well as Leader of the Opposition.

== Mayor of Montreal ==
Drapeau retired in 1986. By this time, Drapeau's Civic Party was increasingly seen as tired and unfocused after a quarter-century in power. The MCM took control of the city in a landslide victory. Doré won the mayoral race in a rout with 68% of the vote, defeating Drapeau's replacement as Civic Party leader, Claude Dupras, by a nearly 3-to-1 margin. The MCM also saw 55 candidates out of 58 were elected to council. Doré was re-elected in 1990 with 59% of the vote.

City Councillor Marvin Rotrand said the Doré era was most notable for a more democratic approach to governance than that of Drapeau.

As mayor, he oversaw the renewal of the Old Port and the parks and beaches of Île Ste-Hélène. He also inaugurated Place Émilie-Gamelin (known informally as Berri Square), Place Charles de Gaulle and the archaeology museum at Pointe-à-Callière.

Under Doré, 150 kilometres of bike paths were constructed, as well as several parks and public beaches, including on Île-Notre-Dame the Plage Jean-Doré.

During his administration, the first public commissions of city council were established and the city's first master urban plan was adopted.

However, Doré was also criticized for an ineffective style of government, including lax policies toward city employees, as well as an unwillingness to pay down the massive debt from Drapeau's megaprojects. As well, some left-wing members of the MCM, including councillors Sam Boskey and Marvin Rotrand, quit his party after the Overdale scandal to form the Democratic Coalition of Montreal (DCM), also known as Coalition démocratique de Montréal (CDM) in French.

== First political retirement ==
In 1994 Doré received only 32% of the vote and was defeated by Vision Montreal candidate Pierre Bourque (47%). He could have taken a seat on the city council after winning his election in the district of Plateau-Mont-Royal with 46% of the ballots, but retired in favor of running mate Thérèse Daviau.

== Attempt at a comeback ==
Doré tried to make a political comeback in 1998. He founded Équipe Montréal (Team Montreal), a new party, and ran for mayor. However, he gathered only 10% of the vote and finished fourth. Two candidates of TM were elected to the city council, but they eventually sat as Independents, and the party ceased to exist shortly before the 2001 election.

== Post politics ==
Doré left public life and became senior director of business development for the central Caisse Desjardins.

== Health ==
In 2014, Doré announced that he had been diagnosed with pancreatic cancer. He died on 15 June 2015.

Political offices
Preceded by Jean Roy	City Councillor, District of Saint-Jean-Baptiste (#39); 1984-1986	Succeeded by Thérèse Daviau (MCM)
