= Basilio Giordano =

Italian-Canadian politician (born 1952)

Italian Senator for North and Central America
- In office 29 April 2008 – 14 March 2013
- Preceded by: Renato Turano
- Succeeded by: Renato Turano

Saint-Leonard City Councillor, Ward Eight
- In office 1982–1990
- Preceded by: Rosario Ortona
- Succeeded by: Vincent Arciresi

Personal details
- Born: February 3, 1952 (age 74) Frascineto, Italy
- Party: The People of Freedom
- Other political affiliations: Vision Montreal; Liberal Party of Canada; Ralliement de Saint-Léonard; Municipal Renewal Party of Saint-Leonard (1982-1984)
- Education: Sapienza University of Rome; Université de Montréal
- Occupation: Politician, journalist

Basilio Giordano (born February 3, 1952) is an Italian and Canadian politician and journalist. He was a city councillor in the Montreal, Quebec borough of Saint-Leonard from 1982 to 1990 and served in the Italian Senate from 2008 to 2013, representing Italian voters in North and Central America as a member of Silvio Berlusconi's People of Freedom party.

== Early life and career ==
Giordano was born in Frascineto, Calabria. While living in Italy, he studied languages and literature at the Sapienza University of Rome and worked in the Vatican's Congregazione di Propaganda Fide. After moving to North America in 1975, he earned a Bachelor of Arts degree in languages from the Université de Montréal (1980). Giordano's biography indicates that he is fluent in Italian, English, French, and Spanish.

Giordano was a political aide to Saint-Leonard mayor Michel Bissonnet from 1978 to 1980 and continued to work for Bissonnet after the latter's election to the National Assembly of Quebec in the 1981.

== City councillor ==
Giordano was elected to the Saint-Leonard city council in 1982 as a member of mayor Antonio di Ciocco's Équipe du renouveau de la cité de Saint-Léonard. This party dissolved after di Ciocco's death in 1984, and Giordano became a founding member of the successor Ralliement de Saint-Léonard (RdSL) party led by new mayor Raymond Renaud. He was re-elected under the new party's banner in 1986. After an internal party crisis in 1988, he was one of only two councillors to remain aligned with Renaud; the other eight RdSL representatives resigned to sit as independents.

== Journalist ==
Giordano become the editor of Il Cittadino Canadese, a community journal for Montreal's Italian community, in 1986.

In 1997, Il Cittadino Canadese accused Carlo Selvaggi, the Italian consul-general in Montreal, of threatening to end the Italian government's financial support for the paper. Il Cittadino Canadese had previously featured an article that accused the consulate of inaccessibility and inefficiency. Selvaggi subsequently met Giordano for a private conversation about the article, and Giordano recorded their conversation. At one stage, Selvaggi said, "If you wish to continue receiving a financial grant, you must stop publishing articles against the consulate." This was perceived by some as a threat, though Selvaggi later denied this and clarified that only the Italian government could make a decision to cancel funding.

== Later political career in Canada ==
A vocal supporter of Canadian federalism, Basilio criticized an open letter written by fourteen prominent Italian Montrealers in 1996 on the grounds that it allowed for the possibility of the community accepting Quebec separatism. He wanted to seek the Liberal Party of Canada nomination for Anjou—Rivière-des-Prairies in the 1997 federal election, but ultimately chose not to stand against party favourite Yvon Charbonneau. In 2007, he ran for the Liberal nomination in Papineau and finished third against Justin Trudeau.

In 2010, former Member of the National Assembly (MNA) William Cusano was awarded $25,000 in a defamation suit against Giordano and Il Cittadino Canadese. The paper had printed an anonymous letter during the 2007 federal nomination contest that alleged Cusano supported a "non-Italian" (Trudeau) in return for the promise of a patronage job. The letter also made the false suggestion that Cusano had "a tendency toward alcohol." Quebec Superior Court judge Pierre Journet ruled that the letter was "false and defamatory" and that Giordano had become a co-author by changing its content before publication.

Giordano ran as a Vision Montreal candidate for the amalgamated Montreal city council in the 2001 municipal election. He finished fifth in Saint-Leonard's three-member borough.

== Italian politician ==
Giordano was elected to the Italian Senate in the 2008 general election, representing Italian voters in North America and Central America. He served on the foreign affairs committee and the committee for Italians living abroad, and was a supporter of Silvio Berlusconi's government until its resignation in 2011.

He was defeated in his bid for re-election in the 2013 Italian election, when Berlusconi's list finished third in North America and Central America.

== Electoral record ==
Italy

2008 Italian general election results: Senate, North and Central America region

Party	Votes	%	Senators
People of Freedom	38,896	44.96	1
Democratic Party	38,103	44.04	
Union of the Centre	7,330	8.47	
The Right–Tricolour Flame	2,193	2.53	
Total valid votes	86,522	100.00	

People of Freedom candidate preference votes
Basilio Giordano (elected)	13,083
Augusto Sorriso	8,699

Democratic Party candidate preference votes
Renato Turano (incumbent)	15,223
Marina Piazzi	7,431

Union of the Centre candidate preference votes
Massimo Seracini	2,194
Vittorio Coco	1,791

The Right–Tricolour Flame candidate preference votes
Giuseppe Cirnigliaro	544
Franco Misuraca	461

Source: ARCHIVIO STORICO DELLE ELEZIONI - Consultazione dati: Senato 13/04/2008, Area ESTERO, Ripartizione AMERICA SETTENTRIONALE E CENTRALE, Ministerio dell'Interno, Government of Italy, accessed 27 July 2011. Voters were not required to give a preference vote for any candidate.

Montreal municipal

2001 Montreal municipal election: Councillor, Saint-Léonard (three members elected)
Party	Candidate	Votes	%
Montreal Island Citizens Union	Frank Zampino	20,279	26.29
Montreal Island Citizens Union	Yvette Bissonnet	18,438	23.90
Montreal Island Citizens Union	Dominic Perri	16,818	21.80
Vision Montreal	Vincenzo Arciresi	7,555	9.79
Vision Montreal	Basilio Giordano	6,417	8.32
Vision Montreal	Louise Blackburn	6,190	8.02
White Elephant Party	Denis Fournier	896	1.16
Independent	Dolly N. Makambo	557	0.72
Total valid votes		77,150	100
Source: Election results, 1833-2005 (in French), City of Montreal.

1986 Saint-Leonard municipal election: Councillor, Ward Eight
Party	Candidate	Votes	%
Ralliement de Saint-Léonard	(x)Basilio Giordano	963	47.16
Rassemblement des citoyens et citoyennes de Saint-Léonard	Rosario Ortona	631	30.90
Unité de Saint-Léonard	Quintino Cimaglia	365	17.87
Équipe démocratique de Saint-Léonard	Antonio Barretta	83	4.06
Total valid votes		2,042	100
Source: "Results of council elections in 18 Montreal-area municipalities," Montreal Gazette, 3 November 1986, A8.

1982 Saint-Leonard municipal election: Councillor, Ward Eight
Party	Candidate	Votes	%
Équipe du renouveau de la cité de Saint-Léonard	Basilio Giordano	910	48.56
Union municipale de Saint-Léonard	Rosario Ortona (incumbent)	648	34.58
Parti de l'alliance municipale	Micheline Neveu	316	16.86
Total valid votes		1,874	100
Source: Le Journal de Saint-Léonard, 9 November 1982, pp. 2-4.
