= Dominic Perri =

Canadian politician

Borough mayor for Saint-Leonard and Montreal City Councillor
- Incumbent
- Assumed office 2 November 2025
- Preceded by: Michel Bissonnet

Montreal City Councillor for Saint-Léonard-Ouest
- In office 1 January 2006 – 2 November 2025
- Preceded by: position created
- Succeeded by: Mauro Barone

Montreal City Councillor for Saint-Léonard (with Frank Zampino and Yvette Bissonnet)
- In office 1 January 2002 – 31 December 2005
- Preceded by: position created
- Succeeded by: position abolished

Saint Leonard City Councillor, Ward Six
- In office 1982–2001
- Preceded by: Eduardo di Bennardo
- Succeeded by: position abolished

Chair of the Commission scolaire Jérôme-Le Royer
- In office 1984–1987
- Preceded by: Alfonso Gagliano
- Succeeded by: Joe Morselli

Member of the Commission scolaire Jérôme-Le Royer, District Eleven
- In office 1994–1998
- Preceded by: redistribution
- Succeeded by: position abolished

Member of the Commission scolaire Jérôme-Le Royer, District Sixteen
- In office 1990–1994
- Preceded by: position created
- Succeeded by: position abolished

Member of the Commission scolaire Jérôme-Le Royer, District Thirteen
- In office 1980–1990
- Preceded by: position created
- Succeeded by: redistribution

Personal details
- Party: Montreal Island Citizens Union/Union Montreal (2001-2013); Independent (2013); Équipe Denis Coderre (2013–)

Dominic Perri is a politician in Montreal, Quebec, Canada. He has served on the Montreal city council since 1 January 2002, and was a member of the Saint-Leonard city council and chair of the Commission scolaire Jérôme-Le Royer.

== Private career ==
Perri holds a Bachelor of Science degree and a master's degree. He is a high-school science teacher in private life.

== Saint Leonard city councillor ==
Perri was elected for Saint Leonard's sixth council district in the 1982 municipal election as a candidate of mayor Antonio di Ciocco's Équipe du renouveau de la cité de Saint-Léonard. The party fragmented after Di Ciocco's death in 1984, and Perri joined the Ralliement de Saint-Léonard under successor mayor Raymond Renaud. He considered running for mayor of Saint Leonard in 1986, saying that he had been approached by local politicians such as Michel Bissonnet. When Renaud announced that he would seek another term, however, Perri decided against challenging him and was instead re-elected to council.

In 1988, Perri joined with Frank Zampino and six other Saint Leonard councillors in resigning from Renaud's party. Charging that Renaud's administration was undemocratic, the rebels established new municipal committees to oversee policy and increase civic participation in government. The group coalesced as the Parti municipal, and Perri was re-elected under its banner in 1990, 1994, and 1998.

== School board commissioner ==
Perri was elected to the Commission scolaire Jérôme-Le Royer in 1980 and re-elected in 1983. He became chair of the board in 1984, succeeding Alfonso Gagliano, who had been elected to the House of Commons of Canada.

Language issues

Perri welcomed the creation of an English-language educational services department in early 1985, saying that it would permit the board's anglophone students to access a full range of services. A single department had previously overseen both French and English services. Later in the year, Perri announced that his board would start providing recreational and crafts services in English.

Perri supported measures to increase bilingualism among his board's students. He promoted a voluntary pilot project for francophone students to receive English-language instruction as early as the first grade. He also oversaw an expansion in French-language education for anglophone students, saying, "I'd like our kids coming out of English school completely bilingual."

Perri opposed efforts to replace Quebec's denominational school system with a language-based system, arguing that the shift would be detrimental to English schools.

Other issues

In 1985, Perri supported a plan to shift 450 French-sector seventh grade students to a local comprehensive school in order to create space for an equal number of younger students. Some parents opposed this plan, arguing that the comprehensive school was too large and that the seventh graders would be exposed to the bad habits of older students. As a compromise, the board proposed constructing a wall that would divide the comprehensive school into two units; it was refused permission to do this by the province's education department. The student transfer ultimately did not take place.

After 1987

When running for re-election in 1987, Perri called for an increased focus on English, French, maths, and sciences, and a reduction in the number of elective courses. His political partnership with fellow commissioner Joe Morselli dissolved during the election, and, although Perri was himself re-elected, only one other member of his governing alliance was returned to the board. The new board chose Morselli to succeed Perri as chair and discontinued Perri's pilot project of teaching English to first-grade francophone students.

Perri was re-elected to the board in 1990 and 1994.

== Montreal city councillor ==
Saint-Leonard was amalgamated into the City of Montreal in 2001. Perri was elected to the Montreal city council in that year's municipal election as a candidate of Gérald Tremblay's Montreal Island Citizens' Union and was re-elected in 2005 and 2009. He has served on the board of the Montreal Transit Corporation and has chaired its subsidiary, Transgesco LP, since its creation.

By virtue of serving on the Montreal city council, Perri also serves on the Saint-Leonard borough council. He chaired the borough's planning advisory committee from 2002 until 2010. In 2005, he introduced a motion for Saint-Leonard to ban pit bull dogs. He also initiated a ban on wood burning in Montreal which led to a municipal bylaw forbidding wood burning in new constructions.

On 3 July 2012, at the Saint-Leonard borough meeting, Perri said that he was not convinced that Saint-Leonard was getting its fair budget share from the City of Montreal as it was promised before the merger with Montreal. He added that he was going to bring it up with the president of the executive committee.

Following the departure of Gerald Tremblay as mayor of Montreal, Perri did not support Michael Applebaum as interim mayor principally because he saw him as a centralizer, someone who does not best represent the interests of Saint Leonard borough. On 8 May 2013, Perri resigned from Union Montreal to sit as an independent Montreal city councillor. He continues promoting the extension of the metro blue line towards Saint Leonard. In addition, Perri urges new mayor and favors bilingual status for Montreal. He joined Équipe Denis Coderre in August 2013.

== Borough Mayor ==
When long-time borough mayor Michel Bissonnet chose not to seek a sixth term, Perri emerged as the obvious successor, having served for many years as a city councillor and been involved in Saint-Léonard politics since the 1980s. Despite his long-standing presence, he faced an unusually competitive race against incumbent borough councillor Suzanne De Larochellière and her new party, Équipe St-Léonard. In the end, Perri won by a narrow margin of just 3.6%: the closest mayoral election in Saint-Léonard since the borough was merged into the city of Montreal in 2002.

== Federal politics ==
Perri campaigned with Liberal Party candidate Nicola Di Iorio in 2015 federal election.

He did the same with Conservative candidate Ilario Maiolo in 2019 despite his colleague Patricia Lattanzio running for the Liberal Party.

== Electoral record ==
=== Borough Mayor ===
2025 Montreal municipal election: Borough Mayor Saint-Leonard
| Party | Candidate | Votes | % | ±% |
|---|---|---|---|---|
| Ensemble Montréal | Dominic Perri | 6,355 | 44.64 | -19.66 |
| Équipe St-Léonard | Suzanne De Larochellière | 5,842 | 41.01 | new |
| Projet Montréal | Luckny Guerrier | 1,373 | 9.64 | -8.07 |
| Independent | Pasqualino Borsellino | 374 | 2.63 | – |
| Independent | Philippe Tessier | 292 | 2.05 | – |
| Total valid votes/expense limit | | 14,236 | 94.59 | |
| Total rejected ballots | | 813 | 5.40 | +1.54 |
| Turnout | | 15,049 | 30.17 | -2.51 |
| Eligible voters | | 49,878 | – | – |

=== City council ===
2021 Montreal municipal election: City Councillor, Saint-Léonard-Ouest
| Party | Candidate | Votes | % | ±% |
|---|---|---|---|---|
| Ensemble Montréal | Dominic Perri | 4,954 | 57.55 | -9.34 |
| Mouvement Montréal | Franco Conciatori | 1,951 | 22.66 | new |
| Projet Montréal | Andres Larrea | 1,703 | 19.78 | -13.33 |
| Total valid votes/expense limit | | 8,608 | 95.80 | |
| Total rejected ballots | | 377 | 4.20 | -1.49 |
| Turnout | | 8,983 | 31.64% | -4.74 |
| Eligible voters | | 28,394 | – | – |

2017 Montreal municipal election: City Councillor, Saint-Léonard-Ouest
| Party | Candidate | Votes | % | ±% |
|---|---|---|---|---|
| Équipe Denis Coderre | Dominic Perri | 6,632 | 66.89 | -0.87 |
| Projet Montréal | Oualid Frej | 3,283 | 33.11 | +15.36 |
| Total valid votes/expense limit | | 9,915 | 94.31 | |
| Total rejected ballots | | 598 | 5.69 | -2.83 |
| Turnout | | 10514 | 36.38 | -0.73 |
| Eligible voters | | 28,901 | – | – |

2013 Montreal municipal election: City Councillor, Saint-Léonard-Ouest
| Party | Candidate | Votes | % | ±% |
|---|---|---|---|---|
| Équipe Denis Coderre | Dominic Perri | 6,241 | 67.76 | +1.07 |
| Projet Montréal | Edna Constant | 1,635 | 17.75 | +9.85 |
| Coalition Montréal | Sonya Mullins | 1,334 | 14.48 | new |
| Total valid votes/expense limit | | 9,210 | 91.48 | |
| Total rejected ballots | | 858 | 8.52 | N/A |
| Turnout | | 10068 | 37.11 | -1.49 |
| Eligible voters | | 27,130 | – | – |

2009 Montreal municipal election: Councillor, Saint-Léonard-Ouest
| Party | Candidate | Votes | % |
|---|---|---|---|
| Union Montreal | Dominic Perri (incumbent) | 6,524 | 66.69 |
| Vision Montreal | Najat Boughaba | 1,330 | 13.60 |
| Action civique Montréal | Rocco De Robertis | 1,155 | 11.81 |
| Projet Montréal | Souad El Haous | 773 | 7.90 |
| Total valid votes | | 9,782 | 100 |
Source: Election results, 2009, City of Montreal.

2005 Montreal municipal election: Councillor, Saint-Léonard-Ouest
| Party | Candidate | Votes | % |
|---|---|---|---|
| Montreal Island Citizens Union | (x)Dominic Perri | 6,977 | 71.70 |
| Vision Montreal | Rocco De Robertis | 2,462 | 25.30 |
| White Elephant Party | Milan Mirich | 292 | 3.00 |
| Total valid votes | | 9,731 | 100 |
Source: City of Montreal official results (in French), City of Montreal.

2001 Montreal municipal election: Councillor, Saint-Léonard (three members elected)
| Party | Candidate | Votes | % |
|---|---|---|---|
| Montreal Island Citizens Union | Frank Zampino | 20,279 | 26.29 |
| Montreal Island Citizens Union | Yvette Bissonnet | 18,438 | 23.90 |
| Montreal Island Citizens Union | Dominic Perri | 16,818 | 21.80 |
| Vision Montreal | Vincenzo Arciresi | 7,555 | 9.79 |
| Vision Montreal | Basilio Giordano | 6,417 | 8.32 |
| Vision Montreal | Louise Blackburn | 6,190 | 8.02 |
| White Elephant Party | Denis Fournier | 896 | 1.16 |
| Independent | Dolly N. Makambo | 557 | 0.72 |
| Total valid votes | | 77,150 | 100 |
Source: Election results, 1833-2005 (in French), City of Montreal.

1998 Saint-Leonard municipal election: Councillor, Ward Six
| Party | Candidate | Votes | % |
|---|---|---|---|
| Parti Municipal | (x)Dominic Perri | accl. | |
Source: Irwin Block, "Second acclamation in a row for Zampino," Montreal Gazette, 15 October 1998, A6.

1994 Saint-Leonard municipal election: Councillor, Ward Six
| Party | Candidate | Votes | % |
|---|---|---|---|
| Parti Municipal | (x)Dominic Perri | accl. | . |
Source: Mike King, "Voting results: the final count," Montreal Gazette, 8 November 1994, A4.

1990 Saint-Leonard municipal election: Councillor, Ward Six
| Party | Candidate | Votes | % |
|---|---|---|---|
| Parti Municipal | (x)Dominic Perri | elected | |
Source: Irwin Block, "St. Leonard votes for change as Cote St. Luc re-elects Lang," Montreal Gazette, 5 November 1990, A5.

1986 Saint-Leonard municipal election: Councillor, Ward Six
| Party | Candidate | Votes | % |
|---|---|---|---|
| Ralliement de Saint-Léonard | (x)Dominic Perri | 1,309 | 66.62 |
| Unité de Saint-Léonard | Luigi Tesolin | 350 | 17.81 |
| Rassemblement des citoyens et citoyennes de Saint-Léonard | Paolo Gervasi | 187 | 9.52 |
| Équipe démocratique de Saint-Léonard | Giovanni Sardo | 119 | 6.06 |
| Total valid votes | | 1,965 | 100 |
Source: "Results of council elections in 18 Montreal-area municipalities," Montreal Gazette, 3 November 1986, A8.

1982 Saint-Leonard municipal election: Councillor, Ward Six
| Party | Candidate | Votes | % |
|---|---|---|---|
| Équipe du renouveau de la cité de Saint-Léonard | Dominic Perri | 1,112 | 52.11 |
| Union municipale de Saint-Léonard | Eduardo di Bennardo (incumbent) | 631 | 29.57 |
| Parti de l'alliance municipale | Fiorino Bianco | 391 | 18.32 |
| Total valid votes | | 2,134 | 100 |
Source: Le Journal de Saint-Léonard, 9 November 1982, pp. 2-4.

=== School commission ===
1994 Commission scolaire Jérôme-Le Royer election: Trustee, District Eleven
| Candidate | Votes | % |
|---|---|---|
| (x)Dominic Perri | accl. | |
Source: "List of winners in Montreal Island board elections," Montreal Gazette, 21 November 1994, p. 6.

1990 Commission scolaire Jérôme-Le Royer election: Trustee, District Sixteen
| Candidate | Votes | % |
|---|---|---|
| (x)Dominic Perri | elected | |
Source: "More school board vote results," Montreal Gazette, 21 November 1990, p. 3.

1987 Commission scolaire Jérôme-Le Royer election: Trustee, District Thirteen
| Candidate | Votes | % |
|---|---|---|
| (x)Dominic Perri | 1,076 | 50.40 |
| Bob Mormina | 884 | 41.41 |
| Andre Blair | 175 | 8.20 |
| Total votes | 2,135 | 100 |
Source: "Winners of election for boards on island," Montreal Gazette, 16 November 1987, p. 6.

1983 Commission scolaire Jérôme-Le Royer election: Trustee, District Thirteen
| Candidate | Votes | % |
|---|---|---|
| (x)Dominic Perri | 1,457 | 79.40 |
| Tony Parente | 378 | 20.60 |
| Total votes | 1,835 | 100 |
Source: "Winners of election for boards on island," Montreal Gazette, 14 June 1983, A4.

1980 Commission scolaire Jérôme-Le Royer election: Trustee, District Thirteen
| Candidate | Votes | % |
|---|---|---|
| Dominic Perri | 1,051 | 57.24 |
| Joseph Lemieux | 785 | 42.76 |
| Total votes | 1,836 | 100 |
Source: "Winners of election for boards on island," Montreal Gazette, 14 June 1983, A4.
