= Municipal political parties in Montreal =

Municipal politics in Montreal's city council revolve around its elected councillors, the municipal political parties to which they belong, and the mayor.

Quebec is one of three provinces in Canada that officially recognizes political parties at the municipal level, the others being British Columbia and Alberta. Political parties were legalized in Quebec by the Parti Québécois government of René Lévesque in 1978. However, they existed long before official recognition by the provincial government.

== Parties represented in Council ==
Name	Founded	Ideology	Leader	Councillors
Ensemble Montréal	2013	Centrism	Soraya Martinez Ferrada	34
Projet Montréal	2004	Social democracy	Ericka Alneus	25
Équipe LaSalle Team	2013		Nancy Blanchet	3
Équipe Anjou	2013		Luis Miranda	2
Équipe St-Léonard	2025		Mauro Barone	1

== Other registered parties ==
Name	Founded	Ideology	Leader
Transition Montréal	2025	Social democracy	Craig Sauvé
Action Montréal - Équipe Gilbert Thibodeau	2025		Gilbert Thibodeau
Futur Montréal	2025		Jean-François Kacou

== Former parties ==
- Action civique de Saint-Léonard
- Action civique Montréal
- Action Montreal
- Civic Action League (1951–1961)
- Civic Party of Montreal (1960–1994)
- Coalition Démocratique–Montréal Écologique
- Équipe conservons Outremont
- Équipe démocratique de Saint-Léonard
- Équipe du renouveau de la cité de Saint-Léonard
- Équipe Montréal
- Montreal Citizens' Movement (1973–2001)
- Montréal Écologique
- Municipal Action Group
- Nouveau Montréal
- Parti de l'alliance municipale (Saint-Leonard)
- Parti des Montréalais
- Parti Fierté Montréal (Montreal Pride Party)
- Parti Montréal Ville-Marie
- Parti Municipal (Saint-Léonard)
- Parti municipal de Montréal
- Parti éléphant blanc de Montréal
- Ralliement de Saint-Léonard
- Rassemblement des citoyens et citoyennes de Saint-Léonard
- Union municipale de Saint-Léonard
- Union Montreal
- Unité de Saint-Léonard
- Vision Montreal (1994–2014)
- Vrai changement pour Montréal
- Plateau sans frontières
- Coalition Montréal
