= Fiorino Bianco =

Canadian politician

Fiorino Bianco is a politician in Montreal, Quebec, Canada. He served on the Montreal city council from 1990 to 1994, initially as a member of mayor Jean Doré's Montreal Citizens' Movement (MCM) and later for other parties.

Bianco ran for city council in the suburban Montreal community of Saint-Leonard in the 1982 and 1986 general elections and in a 1985 by-election. He was defeated on all three occasions. In 1990, he was described as a real-estate broker and former union leader.

In the buildup to the 1990 Montreal municipal election, Bianco challenged incumbent councillor Gilles Berthiaume for the MCM party nomination in Rivière-des-Prairies. Berthiaume resigned from the MCM during the contest in a dispute over party memberships; Bianco subsequently won the nomination and narrowly defeated Berthiaume, who ran as an independent, in the general election. In 1991, Bianco supported the Quebec government's decision to lift a building freeze on Île Rochon within his division. He later supported the building of a detention centre in a different part of the community.

Bianco was expelled from the MCM in late August 1993, amid disputed circumstances. Mayor Doré's office stated that Bianco's private difficulties had put him in a vulnerable position; Bianco rejected this and said that he left the party in a dispute over policy. After serving for several months as an independent councillor, Bianco joined the formerly dominant Civic Party of Montreal in June 1994 and was the party's only council representative during the time of its final collapse. Along with several other Civic Party members, he joined the Montrealers' Party later in the year. Bianco ran under the latter party's banner in the 1994 municipal election and was defeated by a candidate of Pierre Bourque's Vision Montreal party.

Bianco planned to run as an independent candidate for borough mayor of Rivière-des-Prairies–Pointe-aux-Trembles in the 2009 Montreal municipal election, but ultimately did not appear on the ballot. He later sought the Vision Montreal nomination for a 2010 by-election for the same position, but lost to Chantal Rouleau.

== Electoral record ==
1994 Montreal municipal election: Councillor, Rivière-des-Prairies division
Party	Candidate	Votes	%
Vision Montreal	Aimé Charron	2,598	47.90
Montrealers' Party	(x)Fiorino Bianco	1,423	26.24
Independent	Georges Roman	597	11.01
Independent	Pierre Boucher	443	8.17
Democratic Coalition–Ecology Montreal	Rossa Vaccaro	228	4.20
Independent	Antonio Bocchicchio	135	2.49
Total valid votes		5,424	100
Source: Official Results, City of Montreal

1990 Montreal municipal election: Councillor, Rivière-des-Prairies
Party	Candidate	Votes	%
Montreal Citizens' Movement	Fiorino Bianco	2,436	42.91
Independent	Gilles Berthiaume (incumbent)	2,222	39.14
Civic Party of Montreal	Nick Colombo	477	8.40
Municipal Party	Pierre Coutu	260	4.58
Democratic Coalition	Pierre Boucher	147	2.59
Independent	Christian Berthiaume	135	2.38
Total valid votes		5,677	100
Source: Election results, 1833-2005 (in French), City of Montreal.

1986 Saint-Leonard municipal election: Councillor, Ward Eleven
Party	Candidate	Votes	%
Ralliement de Saint-Léonard	(x)Jean-Jacques Goyette	803	35.16
Unité de Saint-Léonard	Marcelle Gaudreault	761	33.32
Équipe démocratique de Saint-Léonard	Fiorino Bianco	456	19.96
Rassemblement des citoyens et citoyennes de Saint-Léonard	Giovanni Mogianesi	264	11.56
Total valid votes		2,284	100
Source: "Results of council elections in 18 Montreal-area municipalities," Montreal Gazette, 3 November 1986, A8.

Saint-Leonard municipal by-election, 21 April 1985: Councillor, Ward Eleven
Party	Candidate	Votes	%
Ralliement de Saint-Léonard	Jean-Jacques Goyette	390	27.31
Union municipale de Saint-Léonard	Marcel Gaudreault	349	24.44
Action civique de Saint-Léonard	Vittorio Galerio	307	21.50
Independent	Fiorino Bianco	293	20.52
Independent	Jeannette Masse	89	6.23
Total valid votes		1,428	100
Source: "Ruling party's candidate wins St. Leonard seat," Montreal Gazette, 24 April 1985, p. 1.

1982 Saint-Leonard municipal election: Councillor, Ward Six
Party	Candidate	Votes	%
Équipe du renouveau de la cité de Saint-Léonard	Dominic Perri	1,112	52.11
Union municipale de Saint-Léonard	Eduardo di Bennardo (incumbent)	631	29.57
Parti de l'alliance municipale	Fiorino Bianco	391	18.32
Total valid votes		2,134	100
Source: Le Journal de Saint-Léonard, 9 November 1982, pp. 2-4.
