= Domenico Moschella =

Montreal City Councillor for Saint-Léonard-Est
- In office 2013 – June 23, 2015
- Preceded by: Robert Zambito
- Succeeded by: Patricia Lattanzio

Commissioner on the Commission scolaire de la Pointe-de-l'Île, Ward Eleven
- Incumbent
- Assumed office 2002
- Preceded by: Massimo Pacetti (until 2002)

Commissioner on the Commission scolaire Jérôme-Le Royer, Ward Ten
- In office 1994–1998
- Preceded by: redistribution
- Succeeded by: Diana Moschella

Commissioner on the Commission scolaire Jérôme-Le Royer, Ward Fourteen
- In office 1990–1994
- Preceded by: redistribution
- Succeeded by: redistribution

Commissioner on the Commission scolaire Jérôme-Le Royer, Ward Eleven
- In office 1987–1990
- Preceded by: Vittorio Galerio
- Succeeded by: redistribution

Saint-Leonard City Councillor, Ward Four
- In office 1998–2001
- Preceded by: redistribution
- Succeeded by: position abolished

Saint-Leonard City Councillor, Ward Ten
- In office 1990–1998
- Preceded by: Maurice Benoît
- Succeeded by: redistribution

Saint-Leonard City Councillor, Ward Three
- In office 1982–1986
- Preceded by: Robert Benoît
- Succeeded by: Frank Zampino

Personal details
- Born: c. 1948
- Died: June 23, 2015 (aged 67) Montreal, Quebec
- Party: Coalition Montréal
- Other political affiliations: Action civique Montréal (2009); Independent (2005); Vision Montreal (2001); Parti Municipal (1994-2001); Ralliement de Saint-Léonard (1986-1994); Action civique de Saint-Léonard (1984-1986); Équipe du renouveau de la cité de Saint-Léonard (1982-1984)

Domenico Moschella, also known as Dominic Moschella, was a politician in Montreal, Quebec, Canada. He served on the Montreal City Council from 2013 to 2015, representing Saint-Léonard-Est as a member of Coalition Montréal.

Moschella was previously a city councillor in Saint-Leonard from 1982 to 1986 and again from 1990 to 2001, prior to the suburban community's amalgamation into the city of Montreal. He also served as a commissioner on the Commission scolaire de la Pointe-de-l'Île.

Moschella died in office on June 23, 2015.

== Private career ==
Moschella was vice-president of an investment counselling firm in 1986. He later worked as a restaurateur.

== Municipal councillor ==
1982–86

Moschella was first elected to the Saint-Leonard council for the city's third district in the 1982 municipal election as a member of mayor Antonio di Ciocco's Équipe du renouveau de la cité de Saint-Léonard. Di Ciocco died in 1984, and his party subsequently split into two groups: Moschella led a new party called Action civique de Saint-Léonard while Raymond Renaud led the rival Ralliement de Saint-Léonard. A mayoral by-election was held in September 1984, and Renaud defeated Moschella in what proved to be an extremely divisive contest.

Renaud later stated that Moschella had run a "malicious" campaign against him; in December 1984, he launched a $41,000 suit for alleged defamatory remarks. Moschella threatened to counter-sue, saying that the new mayor would "wind up paying [his] legal fees and then some" if the matter came to court. He also said that Renaud's lawsuit would be harmful to the democratic process, as politicians might become reluctant to speak openly if they were concerned about provoking legal action. Newspaper accounts do not indicate how the matter was resolved.

Moschella was the only Saint-Leonard city councillor to serve with the Action civique party following the 1984 by-election. He later called for a merger of the city's three opposition parties, and in late 1986 he dissolved Action civique to become a founding member of a new group called Unité de Saint-Léonard. He ran for re-election under this party's banner for the city's twelfth ward in the 1986 municipal election and narrowly lost to Robert Zambito, a candidate of Renaud's slate.

In early 1986, Moschella argued that Saint-Leonard should reduce its business tax rate so as to benefit shopkeepers. The following year, he took part in a local protest against property tax increases.

1990–2001

Renaud's political party lost much of its governing authority in 1988, when councillor Frank Zampino launched a breakaway group (later consolidated as the Parti municipal) with support from a majority of councillors. Moschella appears to have effected a political reconciliation with Renaud after this time, as he was elected as a Ralliement de Saint-Léonard candidate in the 1990 municipal election. Zampino defeated Renaud for the mayoralty and the Parti municipal won a majority on council; Moschella was one of only two opposition councillors to be elected.

In March 1994, Moschella joined with the only other remaining opposition councillor and crossed the floor to join Zampino party's. According to Moschella, city council had already become a collegial, non-partisan environment prior to this time; when he joined Zampino's party, he was quoted as saying, "They [Parti municipal members] treated us as part of the team. We were always aware of everything that was going on." This decision effectively ended partisan politics on Saint-Leonard council for the next seven years, until the city's merger into the new city of Montreal. Moschella was re-elected without opposition in 1994 and again in 1998.

== Montreal city politics ==
Moschella intended to run for a seat on the Montreal City Council in the 2001 municipal election as a member of mayor Pierre Bourque's Vision Montreal party, but he withdrew before election day. He ran for a seat on the Saint-Leonard borough council in 2005 and 2009 and was defeated both times. On the latter occasion, he was a candidate of the newly formed Action civique Montréal.

In the 2013 election, Moschella was elected to Montreal City Council as a Coalition Montréal candidate in the district of Saint-Léonard-Est, winning by just eighty votes over Projet Montréal's Roberta Peressini. The result was heavily impacted by incumbent candidate Robert Zambito's late withdrawal from the race on corruption allegations. The number of rejected ballots exceeded the number of votes for Moschella.

== School commissioner ==
Moschella was elected to the Commission scolaire Jérôme-Le Royer in 1987 and was re-elected in 1990 and 1994. In 1988, he promoted a plan to increase French and English immersion courses for the younger grades. He did not seek re-election in 1998 when the confessional Commission scolaire Jérôme-Le Royer was replaced by the language-based Commission scolaire de la Pointe-de-l'Île, but he was returned to the new board without opposition in 2002, 2003 and 2007.

== Electoral record ==
=== Council and mayoral elections ===
2013 Montreal municipal election: Councillor, Saint-Léonard-Est
| Party | Candidate | Votes | % | ±% |
|---|---|---|---|---|
| Coalition Montréal | Domenico Moschella | 2,468 | 50.82 | – |
| Projet Montréal | Roberta Peressini | 2,388 | 49.18 | +36.97 |
| Total valid votes | | 4,856 | 61.51 | – |
| Total rejected ballots | | 3,039 | 38.49 | – |
| Turnout | | 7,895 | 37.63 | −1.57 |
| Electors on the lists | | 20,982 | – | – |
Source: Election results, 2013, City of Montreal.

2009 Montreal municipal election: Borough councillor, Saint-Léonard-Est
| Party | Candidate | Votes | % | ±% |
|---|---|---|---|---|
| Union Montreal | Lili-Anne Tremblay | 4,429 | 57.86 | −6.96 |
| Action civique | Domenico Moschella | 1,234 | 16.12 | +1.05 |
| Vision Montreal | Marie-Lourdes Louis | 1,162 | 15.18 | −4.94 |
| Projet Montréal | Martin Surprenant | 830 | 10.84 | – |
| Total valid votes | | 7,655 | 92.56 | – |
| Total rejected ballots | | 615 | 7.44 | – |
| Turnout | | 8,270 | 39.09 | – |
| Electors on the lists | | 21,159 | – | – |
Source: Election results, 2009, City of Montreal.

2005 Montreal municipal election: Saint-Leonard borough Councillor, Saint-Léonard-Est division
| Party | Candidate | Votes | % |
|---|---|---|---|
| Montreal Island Citizens Union | (x)Robert Zambito | 4,762 | 64.82 |
| Vision Montreal | Jean-Marc Boivin | 1,478 | 20.12 |
| Independent | Domenico Moschella | 1,107 | 15.07 |
| Total valid votes | | 7,347 | 100 |
Source: City of Montreal official results (in French), City of Montreal.

1998 Saint-Leonard municipal election: Councillor, Ward Four
| Party | Candidate | Votes | % |
|---|---|---|---|
| Parti Municipal | (x)Domenico Moschella | accl. | |
Source: Irwin Block, "Second acclamation in a row for Zampino," Montreal Gazette, 15 October 1998, A6.

1994 Saint-Leonard municipal election: Councillor, Ward Ten
| Party | Candidate | Votes | % |
|---|---|---|---|
| Parti Municipal | (x)Domenico Moschella | accl. | . |
Source: Mike King, "Voting results: the final count," Montreal Gazette, 8 November 1994, A4.

1990 Saint-Leonard municipal election: Councillor, Ward Ten
| Party | Candidate | Votes | % |
|---|---|---|---|
| Ralliement de Saint-Léonard | Domenico Moschella | elected | |
Source: Irwin Block, "St. Leonard votes for change as Cote St. Luc re-elects Lang," Montreal Gazette, 5 November 1990, A5.

1986 Saint-Leonard municipal election: Councillor, Ward Twelve
| Party | Candidate | Votes | % |
|---|---|---|---|
| Ralliement de Saint-Léonard | Robert Zambito | 787 | 39.95 |
| Unité de Saint-Léonard | (x)Domenico Moschella | 753 | 38.22 |
| Équipe démocratique de Saint-Léonard | Jacques Amyot | 216 | 10.96 |
| Rassemblement des citoyens et citoyennes de Saint-Léonard | Michelango Cannistraro | 214 | 10.86 |
| Total valid votes | | 1,970 | 100 |
Source: "Results of council elections in 18 Montreal-area municipalities," Montreal Gazette, 3 November 1986, A8.

Saint-Leonard municipal by-election, 30 September 1984: Mayor
| Party | Candidate | Votes | % |
|---|---|---|---|
| Ralliement de Saint-Léonard | Raymond Renaud | 10,307 | 48.57 |
| Action civique de Saint-Léonard | Domenico Moschella | 5,568 | 26.24 |
| Union municipale de Saint-Léonard | Rosario Ortona | 5,348 | 25.20 |
| Total valid votes | | 21,223 | 100 |
Sources: Il Settimanale, 11 September 1984; Montreal Gazette, 1 October 1984.

1982 Saint-Leonard municipal election: Councillor, Ward Three
| Party | Candidate | Votes | % |
|---|---|---|---|
| Équipe du renouveau de la cité de Saint-Léonard | Domenico Moschella | 984 | 45.16 |
| Union municipale de Saint-Léonard | Yvon Desrochers | 875 | 40.16 |
| Parti de l'alliance municipale | Liborio Sciascia | 320 | 14.69 |
| Total valid votes | | 2,179 | 100 |
Source: Le Journal de Saint-Léonard, 9 November 1982, pp. 2-4.

=== School commission elections ===
2007 Commission scolaire de la Pointe-de-l'Île election: Trustee, District Eleven
| Candidate | Votes | % |
|---|---|---|
| (x)Domenico Moschella | accl. | |
Source Élections scolaires 2007: Liste des candidates et candidats élus; Éducation, Loisir et Sport Québec; accessed 14 October 2011.

2003 Commission scolaire de la Pointe-de-l'Île election: Trustee, District Eleven
| Candidate | Votes | % |
|---|---|---|
| Domenico Moschella | accl. | |
Source "School board races won by acclamation," Montreal Gazette, 23 October 2003, p. 6.

1994 Commission scolaire Jérôme-Le Royer election: Trustee, District Ten
| Candidate | Votes | % |
|---|---|---|
| (x)Domenico Moschella | accl. | |
Source "List of winners in Montreal Island board elections," Montreal Gazette, 21 November 1994, p. 6.

1990 Commission scolaire Jérôme-Le Royer election: Trustee, District Fourteen
| Candidate | Votes | % |
|---|---|---|
| (x)Domenico Moschella | elected | |
Source "More school board vote results," Montreal Gazette, 21 November 1990, p. 3.

1987 Commission scolaire Jérôme-Le Royer election: Trustee, District Eleven
| Candidate | Votes | % |
|---|---|---|
| Domenico Moschella | 654 | 42.91 |
| Agostino Cannavino | 450 | 29.53 |
| Andy Biondi | 420 | 27.56 |
| Total votes | 1,524 | 100 |
Source "Winners of election for boards on island," Montreal Gazette, 16 November 1987, p. 6.
