= 1994 Montreal municipal election =

Election in Quebec, Canada

← 1990	November 6, 1994	1998 →

51 seats in Montreal City Council 26 seats needed for a majority
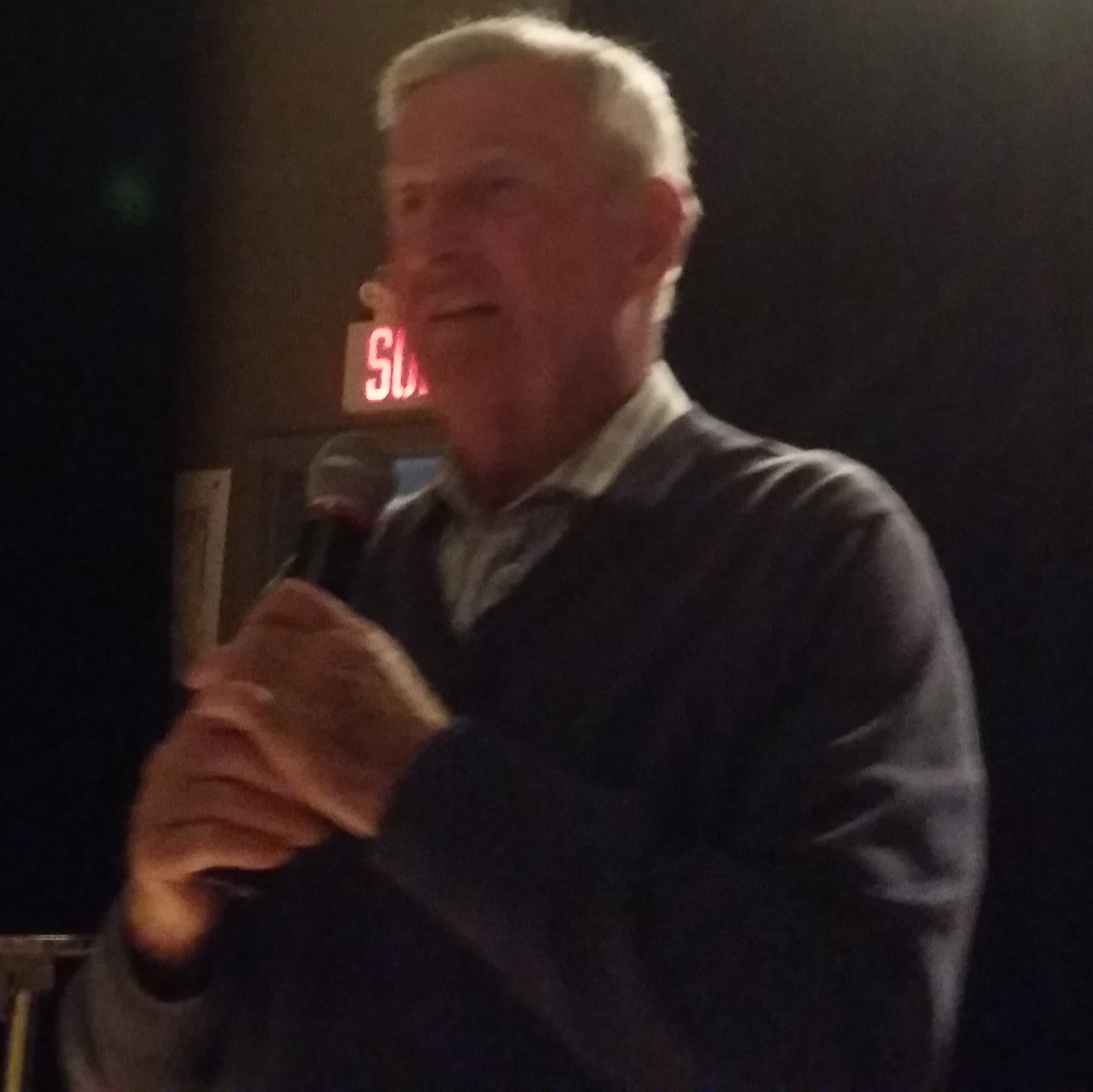

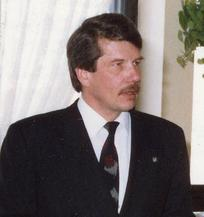
	First party	Second party	Third party
Leader	Pierre Bourque	Jean Doré	Jérôme Choquette
Party	Vision Montreal	Citizens' Movement	Montrealers' Party
Leader since	1994	1982	1993
Last election	pre-creation	42 seats, 59.20%
Seats won	38	7	2
Seat change	▲38	▼35
Popular vote	135,678	91,907	37,214
Percentage	46.6%	31.5%	13.1%
Swing	New	▼27.70%
Mayor before election
Jean Doré
Citizens' Movement
Elected mayor
Pierre Bourque
Vision Montreal

The 1994 Montreal municipal election took place on November 6, 1994. Pierre Bourque was elected to his first term as mayor, defeating incumbent Jean Doré. Elections were also held in Montreal's suburban communities.

== Results ==
=== Mayor ===
1994 Montreal municipal election: Mayor of Montreal
Party	Candidate	Votes	%
Vision Montreal	Pierre Bourque	135,678	47.61
Montreal Citizens' Movement	(x)Jean Doré	91,907	32.25
Montrealers' Party	Jérôme Choquette	37,214	13.06
Democratic Coalition–Ecology Montreal	Yolande Cohen	12,737	4.47
White Elephant Party	Michel Bédard	2,678	0.94
Independent	Carole Caron	1,433	0.50
Independent	Jean-Luc Bonspiel	973	0.34
Independent	Glenmore Browne	818	0.29
Independent	Patricia Métivier	709	0.25
Independent	Carl Zephir	438	0.15
Independent	Marc Rainville	379	0.13
Total valid votes		284,964	100
Source: Official results, City of Montreal.

=== Council (incomplete) ===
Party colours do not indicate affiliation or resemblance to a provincial or a federal party.

Results for city councillor Vision Montreal: 38 seats Montreal Citizens' Movement: 7 seats Independents: 3 seats Montrealers' Party: 2 seats Democratic Coalition: 1 seat

Electoral District		Position	Total valid votes	Candidates					Incumbent
Electoral District		Position	Total valid votes	Montreal Citizens' Movement	Vision Montreal	Montrealers' Party	Democratic Coalition–Ecology Montreal	Others	Incumbent
40	Hochelaga	City councillor	4,374	Diane Barbeau; 1,654 (39.89%)	Luc Larivée; 2,040 (49.20%)	Martin Baller; 329 (7.94%)	Clément Schreiber; 123 (2.97%)		Diane Barbeau
46	Tétreauville	City councillor	6,296	Nicole Milhomme; 1,846 (29.32%)	Jean-Guy Deschamps; 3,465 (55.03%)		Sylvain Lapalme; 181 (2.87%)	Joseph Salerno (Ind.); 804 (12.77%)	Nicole Milhomme

1994 Montreal municipal election: Councillor, Ahuntsic
Party	Candidate	Votes	%
Vision Montreal	Hasmig Belleli	3,458	46.19
Montreal Citizens' Movement	Michel L'Allier	2,182	29.15
Montrealers' Party	Michel Bureau	943	12.60
Independent	Ghassan Saba	572	7.64
Democratic Coalition–Ecology Montreal	Jean-Pierre Le Blanc	203	2.71
White Elephant Party	Christian Coutu	128	1.71
Total valid votes		7,486	100
Source: Official Results, City of Montreal

1994 Montreal municipal election: Councillor, Saint-Sulpice
Party	Candidate	Votes	%
Vision Montreal	Maurice Beauchamp	2,602	39.26
Independent	(x)Michel Benoit	2,125	32.06
Montreal Citizens' Movement	Daniel Ducharme	1,540	23.23
Montrealers' Party	Karine Hénault	263	3.97
Democratic Coalition–Ecology Montreal	Max de Carrier	98	1.48
Total valid votes		6,628	100
Source: Official results, City of Montreal.

1994 Montreal municipal election: Councillor, Saint-Michel
Party	Candidate	Votes	%
Vision Montreal	Paolo Tamburello	2,403	46.81
Montrealers' Party	Pasquale Compierchio (incumbent)	1,711	33.33
Montreal Citizens' Movement	Donato Caivano	737	14.36
Democratic Coalition–Ecology Montreal	Michele A. Benigno	283	5.51
Total valid votes		5,134	100
Source: Official Results, City of Montreal

1994 Montreal municipal election
Party	Candidate	Votes	%
Vision Montreal	Daniel Boucher	1,954	46.85
Montreal Citizens' Movement	Micheline Daigle (incumbent)	1,338	32.08
Montrealers' Party	Antoinette Corrado	672	16.11
Democratic Coalition–Ecology Montreal	Pietro Bozzo	207	4.96
Total valid votes		4,171	100
Source: Official Results, City of Montreal

1994 Montreal municipal election: Councillor, François-Perrault
Party	Candidate	Votes	%
Vision Montreal	Vittorio Capparelli	2,277	48.16
Montreal Citizens' Movement	Lyse Brunet	1,303	27.56
Montrealers' Party	Frank Venneri	1,000	21.15
Democratic Coalition–Ecology Montreal	Mario Laquerre	148	3.13
Total valid votes		4,728	100
Source: Official Results, City of Montreal

1994 Montreal municipal election
Party	Candidate	Votes	%
Montreal Citizens' Movement	(x)Konstantinos Georgoulis	2,419	33.64
Vision Montreal	Angelos Diacoumacos	1,968	27.37
Independent	Sofoklis Rasoulis	959	13.34
Independent	Christos Karidogiannis	828	11.51
Montrealers' Party	George Savoidakis	804	11.18
Democratic Coalition–Ecology Montreal	Peter Stamadianos	213	2.96
Total valid votes		7,191	100
Source: Official Results, City of Montreal

1994 Montreal municipal election: Councillor, Étienne-Desmarteau division
Party	Candidate	Votes	%
Vision Montreal	Michelle Daines	3,322	54.58
Montreal Citizens' Movement	(x)Lea Cousineau	2,177	35.77
Montrealers' Party	Pierre-Érick Noël	434	7.13
Democratic Coalition–Ecology Montreal	Joseph Vega	153	2.51
Total valid votes		6,086	100
Source: Official Results, City of Montreal

1994 Montreal municipal election: Councillor, Laurier
Party	Candidate	Votes	%
Montreal Citizens' Movement	Louise Roy	2,254	39.93
Vision Montreal	Monique Côté	2,117	37.50
Democratic Coalition–Ecology Montreal	Yolande Cohen	676	11.98
Montrealers' Party	Gilbert Thibodeau	455	8.06
White Elephant Party	Benoît Mainguy	88	1.56
Independent	Richard Lemay	55	0.97
Total valid votes		5,645	100
Source: Official Results, City of Montreal

1994 Montreal municipal election: Councillor, Peter-McGill division
Party	Candidate	Votes	%
Vision Montreal	Georgine Coutu	1,694	37.35
Independent	(x)Nick Auf der Maur	1,469	32.39
Montreal Citizens' Movement	Malcolm McLean	640	14.11
Montrealers' Party	Van H. Petteway	477	10.52
Democratic Coalition–Ecology Montreal	Douglas Buckley-Couvrette	203	4.48
White Elephant Party	Pierre Corbeil	53	1.17
Total valid votes		4,536	100
Source: Official results, City of Montreal.

1994 Montreal municipal election
Party	Candidate	Votes	%
Vision Montreal	Aimé Charron	2,598	47.90
Montrealers' Party	(x)Fiorino Bianco	1,423	26.24
Independent	Georges Roman	597	11.01
Independent	Pierre Boucher	443	8.17
Democratic Coalition–Ecology Montreal	Rossa Vaccaro	228	4.20
Independent	Antonio Bocchicchio	135	2.49
Total valid votes		5,424	100
Source: Official Results, City of Montreal

1994 Montreal municipal election
Party	Candidate	Votes	%
Vision Montreal	Germain Prégent (incumbent)	2,713	71.13
Montreal Citizens' Movement	Benoît St-Jean	678	17.78
Montrealers' Party	Dave Schuilenburg	224	5.87
Democratic Coalition–Ecology Montreal	Michael Chamberlain	199	5.22
Total valid votes		3,814	100
Source: Official Results, City of Montreal

1994 Montreal municipal election: Councillor, Louis-Riel division
Party	Candidate	Votes	%
Vision Montreal	(x)Jacques Charbonneau	4,354	61.80
Montreal Citizens' Movement	Yves Bougie	1,814	25.75
Montrealers' Party	Fabienne Bouchard	740	10.50
Democratic Coalition–Ecology Montreal	Phillip Chee	137	1.94
Total valid votes		7,045	100
Source: Official results, City of Montreal.

1994 Montreal municipal election: Councillor, Longue-Pointe
Party	Candidate	Votes	%
Vision Montreal	Claire St-Arnaud	2,482	47.93
Montreal Citizens' Movement	Nicole Boudreau (incumbent)	1,967	37.99
Montrealers' Party	Ronald Gosselin	507	9.79
Democratic Coalition–Ecology Montreal	Jacynthe Simard	222	4.29
Total valid votes		5,178	100
Source: Official Results, City of Montreal

1994 Montreal municipal election: Councillor, Honoré-Beaugrand division
Party	Candidate	Votes	%
Vision Montreal	Ivon Le Duc	2,679	39.83
Montreal Citizens' Movement	(x)Scott McKay	2,422	36.01
Montrealers' Party	Denis Proulx	1,125	16.73
Democratic Coalition–Ecology Montreal	Julie Leduc	262	3.90
Independent	Gilles Simard	156	2.32
White Elephant Party	Guylaine Brisebois	82	1.22
Total valid votes		6,726	100
Source: Official Results, City of Montreal

== Information on the candidates ==
Montreal Citizens' Movement

- Michel L'Allier (Ahuntsic), Donato Caivano (Saint-Michel), and Lise Brunet (François-Perrault) were first-time candidates.

Montrealers' Party

- Michel Bureau (Ahuntsic) was a first-time candidate.
- Antoinette Corrado (Jean-Rivard) was a first-time candidate. She later sought election to the English Montreal School Board in 2007 as an ally of commission chair Dominic Spiridigliozzi.

Democratic Coalition–Ecology Montreal

- Jean-Pierre Le Blanc (Ahuntsic) was a first-time candidate.
- Michele A. Benigno (Saint-Michel) fought for the closure of the Miron landfill in the 1994 election. She later sought election to the English Montreal School Board in 2003 and lost to Rocco Barbieri. Four years later, she ran as part of Barbieri's electoral alliance and was again defeated.
- Pietro Bozzo (Jean-Rivard) was a first-time candidate. He later served as executive director of the Yellow Door, an activist resource center.
- Mario Laquerre (François-Perrault) is a specialist in urban affairs. He studied possible uses for the abandoned Francon Quarry in north-end Montreal during the 1990s and, in the 1994 campaign, articulated his party's position that parts of the quarry could be converted to a giant urban campsite. Laquerre also co-ordinated a local residents group that opposed the Miron quarry landfill site, an active garbage dump located within the city limits. After the 1994 election, he served as president of the Front Commun Québécois pour une Gestion Écologique des Déchets (which sought to limit the shipment of garbage among Quebec's regions) and worked for the group RECYQ-QUÉBEC.

Independents

- Ghassan Saba (Ahuntsic) had previously been a Montreal Citizens' Movement candidate in the 1990 municipal election. A newspaper report from that election listed him as a thirty-eight-year-old investment counsellor.

== Suburban results ==
=== Dorval ===
All members of the Dorval city council were re-elected without opposition.

Electoral District	Position	Total valid votes	Candidates	Incumbent
Electoral District	Position	Total valid votes	Winner	Incumbent
	Mayor	-	Peter Yeomans (acclaimed)	Peter Yeomans
East Ward 1	Councillor	-	Edgar Rouleau (acclaimed)	Edgar Rouleau
East Ward 2	Councillor	-	Emile LaCoste (acclaimed)	Emile LaCoste
East Ward 3	Councillor	-	Raymond Lauzon (acclaimed)	Raymond Lauzon
West Ward 1	Councillor	-	Robert M. Bourbeau (acclaimed)	Robert M. Bourbeau
West Ward 2	Councillor	-	Ian W. Heron (acclaimed)	Ian W. Heron
West Ward 3	Councillor	-	Heather Allard (acclaimed)	Heather Allard

Source: "Who's running where in Nov. 6 elections," Montreal Gazette, October 20, 1994, F2.

=== Montreal North ===
Electoral District	Position	Total valid votes	Candidates			Incumbent
Electoral District	Position	Total valid votes	Renouveau municipal	Collectivité de Montréal-Nord	Independent	Incumbent
	Mayor	18,619	Yves Ryan; 16,459 (88.40%)	Jean-Pierre Menard; 2,160 (11.60%)		Yves Ryan
District 1	Councillor	1,604	Antonin Dupont; 1,332 (83.04%)	Diane Dupont; 272 (16.96%)		Antonin Dupont
District 2	Councillor	1,695	Michelle Allaire; 1,531 (90.32%)	Guy Devin; 164 (9.68%)		Michelle Allaire
District 3	Councillor	2,167	Pierre Blain; 1,665 (76.83%)	Bertrand Wall; 328 (15.14%)	Michel Renaud; 174 (8.03%)	Pierre Blain
District 4	Councillor	-	Georgette Morin (acclaimed)			Georgette Morin
District 5	Councillor	-	Maurice Belanger (acclaimed)			Maurice Belanger
District 6	Councillor	-	Réal Gibeau (acclaimed)			Réal Gibeau
District 7	Councillor	1,826	Jean-Paul Lessard; 1,389 (76.07%)	Jacqueline Roy; 437 (23.93%)		Jean-Paul Lessard
District 8	Councillor	1,572	Normand Fortin; 1,228 (78.12%)	Elaine Bissonnette; 344 (21.88%)		Normand Fortin
District 9	Councillor	1,343	James Infantino; 1,079 (80.34%)	Lise Leonard; 264 (19.66%)		Armand Nadeau
District 10	Councillor	1,963	Andre Coulombe; 1,597 (81.36%)	Jocelyne Millaire; 366 (18.64%)		Andre Coulombe
District 11	Councillor	1,061	Raymond Paquin; 908 (85.58%)	Lazard Vertus; 153 (14.42%)		Raymond Paquin
District 12	Councillor	1,283	Robert Guerriero; 1,110 (86.52%)	Claude Forest; 173 (13.48%)		Robert Guerriero

Source: "Voting Results: The Final Count," Montreal Gazette, November 8, 1994, A4.

=== Saint-Leonard ===
1994 Saint-Leonard municipal election: Councillor, Ward Three
Party	Candidate	Votes	%
Parti Municipal	(x)Mario Battista	accl.	.
Source: Mike King, "Voting results: the final count," Montreal Gazette, 8 November 1994, A4.

1994 Saint-Leonard municipal election: Councillor, Ward Four
Party	Candidate	Votes	%
Parti Municipal	(x)Italo Barone	1,214	72.09
Independent	Joseph Mormina	470	27.91
Total valid votes		1,684	100
Source: Mike King, "Voting results: the final count," Montreal Gazette, 8 November 1994, A4.

1994 Saint-Leonard municipal election: Councillor, Ward Six
Party	Candidate	Votes	%
Parti Municipal	(x)Dominic Perri	accl.	.
Source: Mike King, "Voting results: the final count," Montreal Gazette, 8 November 1994, A4.

1994 Saint-Leonard municipal election: Councillor, Ward Seven
Party	Candidate	Votes	%
Parti Municipal	(x)Yvette Bissonnet	accl.	
Source: Mike King, "Voting results: the final count," Montreal Gazette, 8 November 1994, A4.

1994 Saint-Leonard municipal election: Councillor, Ward Eight
Party	Candidate	Votes	%
Parti Municipal	(x)Vincenzo Arciresi	accl.	.
Source: Mike King, "Voting results: the final count," Montreal Gazette, 8 November 1994, A4.

1994 Saint-Leonard municipal election: Councillor, Ward Ten
Party	Candidate	Votes	%
Parti Municipal	(x)Domenico Moschella	accl.	.
Source: Mike King, "Voting results: the final count," Montreal Gazette, 8 November 1994, A4.

1994 Saint-Leonard municipal election: Councillor, Ward Twelve
Party	Candidate	Votes	%
Parti municipal	(x)Robert Zambito	845	53.45
Independent	Giacomo Vigna	736	46.55
Total valid votes		1,581	100
Source: Mike King, "Voting results: the final count," Montreal Gazette, 8 November 1994, A4.

== Information on candidates in suburban communities ==
Independents

- Joseph Mormina is a Montreal entrepreneur. He sought election to the Saint-Leonard city council in 1978 and 1982 as a candidate of the Équipe du renouveau de la cité de Saint-Léonard and was narrowly defeated both times. When his party fragmented in 1984, Mormina joined the Action civique de Saint-Léonard and supported Domenico Moschella's bid to become mayor of Saint-Leonard in a municipal by-election. Action civique later folded into Unité de Saint-Léonard, and Mormina ran unsuccessfully for the latter party in the 1986 municipal election. He ran as an independent in 1994.

== Results in other Montreal-area communities ==
=== Longueuil ===
Parti municipal de Longueuil leader Claude Gladu was elected to his first term as mayor, succeeding Roger Ferland. The Parti municipal won fourteen seats on council, while former mayor Jacques Finet's Alliance de Longueuil won the remaining six.

Electoral District	Position	Total valid votes	Candidates				Incumbent
Electoral District	Position	Total valid votes	Parti municipal	Parti Longueuillois	Alliance de Longueuil	Independent	Incumbent
	Mayor	47,185	Claude Gladu; 19,223 (40.74%)	Gisèle Hamelin; 14,041 (29.76%)	Jacques Finet; 13,921 (29.50%)		Roger Ferland
Ward One	Councillor	1,850	Joël Gamache; 650 (35.14%)	Claude Nephtali; 557 (30.11%)	Richard Gagnon; 643 (34.76%)		Pierre Beaudry
Ward Two	Councillor	2,425	Mario Genest; 854 (35.22%)	Martin Clark; 617 (25.44%)	Cécile Langevin; 954 (39.34%)		Cécile Langevin
Ward Three	Councillor	2,105	Henri Dubois; 1,251 (59.43%)	Anne-Marie Bischoff; 396 (18.81%)	Diane Smith; 458 (21.76%)		Claude Gladu
Ward Four	Councillor	2,374	Gérald Marcil; 902 (37.99%)	Bernard Lacelles; 531 (22.37%)	Sylvie Robidas; 941 (39.64%)		Sylvie Robidas
Ward Five	Councillor	2,076	Nicole Béliveau; 1,068 (51.45%)	Yves Ferron; 474 (22.83%)	Sylvie Grenier; 534 (25.72%)		Nicole Béliveau
Ward Six	Councillor	2,095	Réjean Vincent; 470 (22.43%)	Ginette Lemarier; 659 (31.46%)	Normand Caisse; 966 (46.11%)		Jacques Morissette
Ward Seven	Councillor	2,267	Alain St-Pierre; 1,102 (48.61%)	Martin Daraîche; 497 (21.92%)	Charles A. Ashton; 668 (29.47%)		Roger Lacombe
Ward Eight	Councillor	2,022	Johane Deshaies; 866 (42.83%)	Jean Claude D’Amour; 485 (23.99%)	Suzanne Cyr; 671 (33.18%)		Johane Deshaies
Ward Nine	Councillor	2,585	Nicole Lafontaine; 1,056 (40.85%)	Jacqueline Bonenfant; 721 (27.89%)	Pierre Nantel; 808 (31.26%)		Pierre Nantel
Ward Ten	Councillor	2,026	Manon Hénault; 1,039 (51.28%)	Olivette Rousseau; 474 (23.40%)	Jean Babin; 513 (25.32%)		Manon Hénault
Ward Eleven	Councillor	2,396	Serge Sévigny; 982 (40.98%)	Constant Jeanty; 598 (24.96%)	Pierre Pétroni; 816 (34.06%)		Serge Sévigny
Ward Twelve	Councillor	2,410	Lise Sauvé; 1,060 (43.98%)	Micheline Ward; 325 (13.49%)	Michel Champagne; 1,025 (42.53%)		Michel Champagne
Ward Thirteen	Councillor	2,272	Bertrand Girard; 866 (38.12%)	Omer Leclerc; 570 (25.09%)	Jean St-Hilaire; 836 (36.80%)		Jean St-Hilaire
Ward Fourteen	Councillor	2,125	Ginette Lalonde; 653 (30.73%)	Jean-Pierre Trahan; 184 (8.66%)	Michel Timperio; 1,288 (60.61%)		Michel Timperio
Ward Fifteen	Councillor	2,320	Henri Charbonneau; 721 (31.08%)	Arthur Méthot; 540 (23.28%)	Florent Charest; 1,059 (45.65%)		Florent Charest
Ward Sixteen	Councillor	2,155	Pierre Beaudry; 882 (40.93%)	Joanne Savoie; 614 (28.49%)	Thérèse Lafrenière; 659 (30.58%)		Georges Touten
Ward Seventeen	Councillor	2,506	Claude Lamoureux; 1,040 (41.50%)	Gérald Varichon; 391 (15.60%)	Pierre Racicot; 1,075 (42.90%)		Pierre Racicot
Ward Eighteen	Councillor	2,934	Jacques Milette; 1,365 (46.52%)	Richard Briggs; 624 (21.27%)	Marc Lachance; 945 (32.21%)		Jacques Milette
Ward Nineteen	Councillor	2,975	Claudette Tessier; 1,465 (49.24%)	Pierre Plourde; 711 (23.90%)	Pierre Lestage; 740 (24.87%)	Raymond Lévesque; 59 (1.98%)	Benoît Danault
Ward Twenty	Councillor	2,910	Simon Crochetière; 1,283 (44.09%)	Pardo Chiocchio; 835 (28.69%)	Léo Paduano; 792 (27.22%)		Léo Paduano

Source: Le Parti municipal de Longueuil: "Roger Ferland, le gestionnaire", Société historique et culturelle du Marigot, accessed February 27, 2014.
