= Action civique Montréal =

Action civique Montréal (ACM) was a municipal political party that existed from 2009 to 2010 in Montreal, Quebec, Canada. The party fielded five candidates in the 2009 Montreal municipal election, all of whom ran in the borough of Saint-Leonard. ACM's leader was Italo Barone, who was also its candidate for borough mayor.

== Platform ==
ACM advocated the devolution of municipal services from the City of Montreal to Saint-Leonard. In announcing the party's formation, Barone said that he was open to the possibility of withdrawing Saint-Leonard from Montreal and returning the community to its pre-2001 status as a separate municipality.

== Party leader ==
Italo Barone is a Montreal entrepreneur. He was elected to the Saint-Leonard city council in 1990 as a member of Frank Zampino's Parti municipal and was re-elected in 1994 and 1998. He later sought election to the new Saint-Leonard borough council in the 2001 municipal election, following Saint-Leonard's amalgamation into Montreal. Running for Pierre Bourque's Vision Montreal party, he finished second against Mario Battista from Gérald Tremblay's Montreal Island Citizens' Union. The 2009 election was his first as a party leader.

== Results and aftermath ==
ACM received 5,723 votes, and none of its candidates were elected. Barone received about 10% of the vote in the mayoral contest, finishing third against incumbent Michel Bissonnet of the Union Montreal party. ACM was disestablished in September 2010.

== Electoral record ==
2009 Montreal municipal election: Borough mayor of Saint-Leonard
Party	Candidate	Votes	%
Union Montreal	(x)Michel Bissonnet	12,449	69.72
Vision Montreal	Vittorio Capparelli	2,035	11.40
Action civique Montréal	Italo Barone	1,868	10.46
Projet Montréal	Nicolas Marchildon	1,325	7.42
Independent	David Mallozzi	179	1.00
Total valid votes		17,856	100
Source: Election results, 2009, City of Montreal.

2009 Montreal municipal election: Councillor, Saint-Léonard-Est division
Party	Candidate	Votes	%
Union Montreal	Robert Zambito	4,928	63.51
Vision Montreal	Raphaël Fortin	1,135	14.63
Projet Montréal	Franco Fiori	947	12.21
Action civique Montréal	Louise Blackburn	749	9.65
Total valid votes		7,759	
Source: Election results, 2009, City of Montreal.

2009 Montreal municipal election: Councillor, Saint-Léonard-Ouest
Party	Candidate	Votes	%
Union Montreal	Dominic Perri (incumbent)	6,524	66.69
Vision Montreal	Najat Boughaba	1,330	13.60
Action civique Montréal	Rocco De Robertis	1,155	11.81
Projet Montréal	Souad El Haous	773	7.90
Total valid votes		9,782	100
Source: Election results, 2009, City of Montreal.

2009 Montreal municipal election: Borough councillor, Saint-Léonard-Est
Party	Candidate	Votes	%	±%
Union Montreal	Lili-Anne Tremblay	4,429	57.86	−6.96
Action civique	Domenico Moschella	1,234	16.12	+1.05
Vision Montreal	Marie-Lourdes Louis	1,162	15.18	−4.94
Projet Montréal	Martin Surprenant	830	10.84	–
Total valid votes		7,655	92.56	–
Total rejected ballots		615	7.44	–
Turnout		8,270	39.09	–
Electors on the lists		21,159	–	–
Source: Election results, 2009, City of Montreal.

2009 Montreal municipal election: Saint-Leonard Borough Councillor, Saint-Léonard-Ouest division
Party	Candidate	Votes	%
Union Montreal	(x)Mario Battista	6,653	67.39
Vision Montreal	Carmelo de Stefano	1,408	14.26
Projet Montréal	Martin Lavallée	1,095	11.09
Action civique Montréal	Luis Ruivo	717	7.26
Total valid votes		9,873	100
Source: Election results, 2009, City of Montreal.
