= Journet (disambiguation) =

Journet may refer to:

Places

- Journet, a commune in the Vienne department, France

People

- Charles Journet (1891–1975), Swiss Roman Catholic theologian and cardinal
- Françoise Journet (died 1720), French operatic soprano singer
- Laurent Journet (born 5 February 1970), French swimmer
- Marcel Journet (1868–1933), French operatic bass singer
- Marcel Journet (actor) (1895–1973), French film and stage actor
- Pierre Journet, justice of the Quebec Superior Court
