= 1986 Montreal municipal election =

Election in Quebec, Canada

← 1982	November 9, 1986	1990 →

58 30 seats needed for a majority
- Turnout: 48.82%
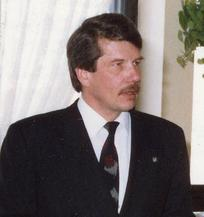
	First party	Second party	Third party
Candidate	Jean Doré	Claude Dupras	Kenneth Cheung
Leader	Jean Doré
Party	Citizens' Movement	Civic Party of Montreal	Democratic Municipal Alliance
Seats before	14	40	0
Seats won	51	1	1
Seat change	+14	1	+1
Popular vote	230,025	99,739	4,108
Percentage	67.70%	29.35%	1.21%

The 1986 Montreal municipal election took place on November 9, 1986, to elect a mayor and city councillors in Montreal, Quebec, Canada. Longtime mayor Jean Drapeau did not seek re-election, and Jean Doré from the opposition Montreal Citizens' Movement (MCM) was elected to the position by a significant margin.

Elections also took place in suburban Montreal communities.

== Results ==
=== Mayor ===
CANDIDATE	PARTY	VOTES	%
Jean Doré	Montreal Citizens' Movement	230,025	67.70%
Claude Dupras	Civic Party of Montreal	99,739	29.35%
Kenneth Cheung	Democratic municipal Alliance	4,108	1.21%
Marie-Claire Desroches	Independent	2,282	0.67%
Gilles Côté	Independent	1,676	0.49%
Phillip Moscovtich	Independent	1,235	0.36%
Ned Dmytryshyn	Independent	708	0.21%
TOTAL		339,773	100.00%

=== City Council ===
PARTY	SEATS IN CITY COUNCIL
Montreal Citizens' Movement	55 / 58
Civic Party of Montreal	1 / 58
Democratic municipal Alliance	1 / 58
Independent	1 / 58

Electoral District	Position	Total valid votes	Candidates				Incumbent
Electoral District	Position	Total valid votes	Montreal Citizens' Movement	Civic Party of Montreal	Democratic Municipal Alliance of Montreal (ADMM)	Independents	Incumbent
	Mayor	339,773	Jean Doré; 230,025 (67.70%)	Claude Dupras; 99,739 (29.35%)	Kenneth Cheung; 4,108 (1.21%)	Marie-Claire Desroches; 2,282 (0.67%) Gilles Côté; 1,676 (0.49%) Philip Moscovitch; 1,235 (0.36%) Ned Dmytryshyn; 708 (0.21%)	Jean Drapeau
Louis Riel	City councillor	7,428	Jacques Charbonneau; 4,506 (60.66%)	Carmen G. Millette; 2,922 (39.34%)			Carmen G. Millette
Marie-Victorin	City councillor	7,404	Réal Charest; 4,524 (61.10%)	François Delorme; 2,880 (38.90%)			Fernand Desjardins
Longue-Pointe	City councillor	6,138	Nicole Boudreau; 4,260 (69.40%)	Luc Larivée; 2,040 (30.60%)			Luc Larivée
Maisonneuve	City councillor	5,611	Ginette L'Heureux; 3,702 (65.98%)	Roger Gallagher; 1,909 (34.02%)			André Roy
François-Perrault	City councillor	5,688	Frank Venneri; 3,564 (62.66%)	Rocco Luccisano; 2,124 (37.34%)			Rocco Luccisano
Gabriel-Sagard	City councillor	6,400	Vittorio Capparelli; 3,139 (49.05%)	Marc Beaudoin; 1,874 (29.28%)	Marcel Paquet; 1,387 (21.67%)		Marc Beaudoin
Jean-Rivard	City councillor	3,653	Micheline Daigle; 2,476 (67.78%)	Raymonde Filion; 1,177 (32.22%)			Ernest Roussille
Jean-Talon	City councillor	3,653	Pierre Goyer; 2,870 (59.33%)	George Savoidakis; 1,547 (31.98%)	Demetre Costopoulos; 420 (8.68%)		George Savoidakis
Laurier	City councillor	5,237	Robert Perreault; 3,701 (70.67%)	Gilles Lupien; 1,137 (21.71%)		Roger Larivée; 399 (7.62%)	Robert Perreault
Sainte-Marie	City councillor	5,658	Serge Lajeunesse; 3,420 (60.45%)	Serge Bélanger; 2,152 (38.03%)	Yvon Roy; 86 (1.52%)		Serge Bélanger
Ville-Marie	City councillor	4,792	John Gardiner; 3,197 (66.72%)	René Avon; 1,240 (25.88%)	Cynthia Cheung; 355 (7.41%)		John Gardiner
Saint-Henri	City councillor	5,419	Kevin Cadloff; 2,254 (41.59%)	Germain Prégent; 3,165 (58.41%)			Germain Prégent

== Results in suburban communities (incomplete) ==
=== Dorval ===
All of Dorval's serving representatives were re-elected without opposition.

Electoral District	Position	Total valid votes	Candidates	Incumbent
Electoral District	Position	Total valid votes	Winner	Incumbent
	Mayor	-	Peter Yeomans (acclaimed)	Peter Yeomans
East Ward 1	Councillor	-	Edgar Rouleau (acclaimed)	Edgar Rouleau
East Ward 2	Councillor	-	Emile LaCoste (acclaimed)	Emile LaCoste
East Ward 3	Councillor	-	Jules Daigle (acclaimed)	Jules Daigle
West Ward 1	Councillor	-	Robert M. Bourbeau (acclaimed)	Robert M. Bourbeau
West Ward 2	Councillor	-	Ian W. Heron (acclaimed)	Ian W. Heron
West Ward 3	Councillor	-	Frank Richmond (acclaimed)	Frank Richmond

Source: Elizabeth Thompson, "Dorval mayor, councillors returned by acclamation," Montreal Gazette, October 23, 1986, I7.

=== Montréal-Nord (November 2) ===
Electoral District	Position	Total valid votes	Candidates			Incumbent
Electoral District	Position	Total valid votes	Renouveau municipal	Action locale et municipal	Independent	Incumbent
	Mayor	-	Yves Ryan (acclaimed)			Yves Ryan
District 1	Councillor	1,516	Antonin Dupont; 1,266 (83.51%)	Pierre Lacombe; 250 (16.49%)		Antonin Dupont
District 2	Councillor	1,701	Michelle Allaire; 1,331 (78.25%)	Elaine Bissonnette; 328 (19.28%)	Albert Donat Dumouchel; 42 (2.47%)	Ernest Chartrand
District 3	Councillor	-	Pierre Blain (acclaimed)			Pierre Blain
District 4	Councillor	945	Georgette Morin; 652 (68.99%)	Richard Bonin; 293 (31.01%)		Georgette Morin
District 5	Councillor	-	Maurice Bélanger (acclaimed)			Maurice Bélanger
District 6	Councillor	-	Réal Gibeau (acclaimed)			Réal Gibeau
District 7	Councillor	-	Jean-Paul Lessard (acclaimed)			Jean-Paul Lessard
District 8	Councillor	-	Normand Fortin (acclaimed)			Normand Fortin
District 9	Councillor	-	Armand Nadeau (acclaimed)			Armand Nadeau
District 10	Councillor	-	André Coulombe (acclaimed)			André Coulombe
District 11	Councillor	-	Raymond Paquin (acclaimed)			Raymond Paquin
District 12	Councillor	1,391	Robert Guerriero; 1008 (72.47%)	Pierre Gamache; 383 (27.53%)		Robert Guerriero

Sources: "Laid-back Ryan isn't worried by Nov. 2 elections," 16 October 1986, p. 6; "Montreal North councillor quits," Montreal Gazette, October 23, 1986, H3; "Results of council elections in 18 Montreal-area municipalities," Montreal Gazette, November 3, 1986, A8.

=== Saint-Leonard ===
1986 Saint-Leonard municipal election: Mayor
Party	Candidate	Votes	%
Ralliement de Saint-Léonard	(x)Raymond Renaud	11,374	44.30
Unité de Saint-Léonard	Tony Iammatteo	8,304	32.34
Équipe démocratique de Saint-Léonard	Andre Bastien	3,218	12.53
Rassemblement des citoyens et citoyennes de Saint-Léonard	Rosario Nobile	2,778	10.82
Total valid votes		25,674	100
Source: "Results of council elections in 18 Montreal-area municipalities," Montreal Gazette, 3 November 1986, A8.

1986 Saint-Leonard municipal election: Councillor, Ward Three
Party	Candidate	Votes	%
Ralliement de Saint-Léonard	Frank Zampino	1,006	47.23
Unité de Saint-Léonard	Tony Iadeluca	646	30.33
Équipe démocratique de Saint-Léonard	Yvon Desrochers	402	18.87
Rassemblement des citoyens et citoyennes de Saint-Léonard	Bruno Madvo	76	3.57
Total valid votes		2,130	100
Source: "Results of council elections in 18 Montreal-area municipalities," Montreal Gazette, 3 November 1986, A8.

1986 Saint-Leonard municipal election: Councillor, Ward Four
Party	Candidate	Votes	%
Ralliement de Saint-Léonard	(x)Pari Montanaro	1,278	50.12
Unité de Saint-Léonard	Joseph Mormina	827	32.43
Équipe démocratique de Saint-Léonard	Sylvie Bourassa	260	10.20
Rassemblement des citoyens et citoyennes de Saint-Léonard	Domenico Manzo	185	7.25
Total valid votes		2,550	100
Source: "Results of council elections in 18 Montreal-area municipalities," Montreal Gazette, 3 November 1986, A8.

1986 Saint-Leonard municipal election: Councillor, Ward Five
Party	Candidate	Votes	%
Ralliement de Saint-Léonard	Alex Pacetti	1,270	61.89
Unité de Saint-Léonard	Gaetane Laporte	437	21.30
Rassemblement des citoyens et citoyennes de Saint-Léonard	Liborio Sciascia	266	12.96
Équipe démocratique de Saint-Léonard	Frank Toro	79	3.85
Total valid votes		2,052	100
Source: "Results of council elections in 18 Montreal-area municipalities," Montreal Gazette, 3 November 1986, A8.

1986 Saint-Leonard municipal election: Councillor, Ward Six
Party	Candidate	Votes	%
Ralliement de Saint-Léonard	(x)Dominic Perri	1,309	66.62
Unité de Saint-Léonard	Luigi Tesolin	350	17.81
Rassemblement des citoyens et citoyennes de Saint-Léonard	Paolo Gervasi	187	9.52
Équipe démocratique de Saint-Léonard	Giovanni Sardo	119	6.06
Total valid votes		1,965	100
Source: "Results of council elections in 18 Montreal-area municipalities," Montreal Gazette, 3 November 1986, A8.

1986 Saint-Leonard municipal election: Councillor, Ward Seven
Party	Candidate	Votes	%
Ralliement de Saint-Léonard	Yvette Bissonnet	790	41.27
Unité de Saint-Léonard	Remi Boyer	772	40.33
Rassemblement des citoyens et citoyennes de Saint-Léonard	Vincent Rizzuto	182	9.51
Équipe démocratique de Saint-Léonard	Micheline Neveu-Dumontet	170	8.88
Total valid votes		1,914	100
Source: "Results of council elections in 18 Montreal-area municipalities," Montreal Gazette, 3 November 1986, A8.

1986 Saint-Leonard municipal election: Councillor, Ward Eight
Party	Candidate	Votes	%
Ralliement de Saint-Léonard	(x)Basilio Giordano	963	47.16
Rassemblement des citoyens et citoyennes de Saint-Léonard	Rosario Ortona	631	30.90
Unité de Saint-Léonard	Quintino Cimaglia	365	17.87
Équipe démocratique de Saint-Léonard	Antonio Barretta	83	4.06
Total valid votes		2,042	100
Source: "Results of council elections in 18 Montreal-area municipalities," Montreal Gazette, 3 November 1986, A8.

1986 Saint-Leonard municipal election: Councillor, Ward Ten
Party	Candidate	Votes	%
Ralliement de Saint-Léonard	(x)Maurice Benoît	767	33.20
Équipe démocratique de Saint-Léonard	Jules Lauzon	730	31.60
Unité de Saint-Léonard	Gabriel Paradis	626	27.10
Rassemblement des citoyens et citoyennes de Saint-Léonard	Yvon Plante	187	8.10
Total valid votes		2,310	100
Source: "Results of council elections in 18 Montreal-area municipalities," Montreal Gazette, 3 November 1986, A8.

1986 Saint-Leonard municipal election: Councillor, Ward Eleven
Party	Candidate	Votes	%
Ralliement de Saint-Léonard	(x)Jean-Jacques Goyette	803	35.16
Unité de Saint-Léonard	Marcelle Gaudreault	761	33.32
Équipe démocratique de Saint-Léonard	Fiorino Bianco	456	19.96
Rassemblement des citoyens et citoyennes de Saint-Léonard	Giovanni Mogianesi	264	11.56
Total valid votes		2,284	100
Source: "Results of council elections in 18 Montreal-area municipalities," Montreal Gazette, 3 November 1986, A8.

1986 Saint-Leonard municipal election: Councillor, Ward Twelve
Party	Candidate	Votes	%
Ralliement de Saint-Léonard	Robert Zambito	787	39.95
Unité de Saint-Léonard	(x)Domenico Moschella	753	38.22
Équipe démocratique de Saint-Léonard	Jacques Amyot	216	10.96
Rassemblement des citoyens et citoyennes de Saint-Léonard	Michelango Cannistraro	214	10.86
Total valid votes		1,970	100
Source: "Results of council elections in 18 Montreal-area municipalities," Montreal Gazette, 3 November 1986, A8.

== Subsequent by-elections in suburban communities ==
Anjou

Anjou municipal by-election, 1 March 1987: Councillor, Lucie Bruneau division
Party	Candidate	Votes	%
Alliance municipale d'Anjou	Nicole Massue	708	54.00
Relève democratique municipale	Pierre Charbonneau	503	38.37
Independent	René Vergé	100	7.63
Total valid votes		1,311	100
Source: Debbie Parkes, "Anjou split continues as mayor's side wins a seat," Montreal Gazette, 2 March 1987, A3. The by-election was caused by the death of Michel Massue in December 1986.

== Results in other Montreal-area communities (incomplete) ==
=== Longueuil ===
The governing Parti municipal de Longueuil was returned to office with a landslide majority. Party leader Jacques Finet was re-elected to a second term as mayor, and the party won all nineteen seats on council.

Winning candidates are listed in boldface.

Electoral District	Position	Total valid votes	Candidates			Incumbent
Electoral District	Position	Total valid votes	Parti municipal	Parti civique	Independent	Incumbent
	Mayor	35,419	**Jacques Finet**; 28,675 (80.96%)	Claude Jollet; 6,744 (19.04%)		Jacques Finet
District 1	Councillor	1,191	**Pierre Hurtubise**; 784 (65.83%)	Gilles Petel; 407 (34.17%)		
District 2	Councillor	1,876	**André Normandin**; 1402 (74.73%)	Marcel Tessier; 474 (25.27%)		
District 3	Councillor	1,680	**Claude Gladu**; 1,296 (77.14%)	Lucie Bertrand-Giroux; 384 (22.86%)		Claude Gladu
District 4	Councillor	2,000	**Roger Ferland**; 1,380 (69.00%)	Marc E. Decelles; 620 (31.00%)		Roger Ferland
District 5	Councillor	1,874	**Nicole Béliveau-Zeitter**; 1,170 (62.43%)	Paul-Auguste Briand; 704 (37.57%)		Nicole Béliveau-Zeitter
District 6	Councillor	2,147	**Jacques Morissette**; 1,899 (88.45%)	François Robidas; 208 (9.69%)	Lorenzo Defoy Jr. 40 (1.86%)	Jacques Morissette
District 7	Councillor	1,225	**Roger Lacombe**; 1,007 (82.20%)	Claude Royal; 218 (17.80%)		Roger Lacombe
District 8	Councillor	1,949	**Gilles Déry**; 1,401 (71.88%)	Solange Therrien; 548 (28.12%)		Gilles Déry
District 9	Councillor	2,466	**Magella Richard**; 1,384 (56.12%)	Pierre Nantel; 1,082 (43.88%)		Pierre Nantel
District 10	Councillor	1,713	**Florence Mercier**; 1,524 (88.97%)	Serge Darveau; 189 (11.03%)		Florence Mercier
District 11	Councillor	1,589	**Serge Sévigny**; 1,354 (85.21%)	Michel Landry; 235 (14.79%)		Serge Sévigny
District 12	Councillor	1,534	**Lise Sauvé-Thiverge**; 1,200 (78.23%)	André Giroux; 334 (21.77%)		Lise Sauvé-Thiverge
District 13	Councillor	1,853	**Jean St-Hilaire**; 1,186 (64.00%)	Jean-Pierre Trahan; 667 (36.00%)		Jean-Pierre Trahan
District 14	Councillor	1,931	**Michel Timperio**; 1,754 (90.83%)	Mario Chartier; 177 (9.17%)		Michel Timperio
District 15	Councillor	1,710	**Florent Charest**; 1,334 (78.01%)	André Chapdelaine; 376 (21.99%)		Florent Charest
District 16	Councillor	2,065	**Georges Touten**; 1,311 (63.49%)	Jacques Bouchard; 754 (36.51%)		Jacques Bouchard
District 17	Councillor	2,065	**André Létourneau**; 1,864 (90.27%)	André Chartier; 201 (9.73%)		André Létourneau
District 18	Councillor	1,769	**Jacques Milette**; 1,224 (69.19%)	Lise Rathé; 545 (30.81%)		
District 19	Councillor	2,957	**Benoît Danault**; 2,180 (73.72%)	Jean L’Écuyer; 777 (26.28%)		Benoit Danault

Source: Le Parti municipal de Longueuil: Jacques Finet, l'innovateur, Société historique et culturelle du Marigot, accessed February 19, 2014. Some minor corrections to the names of some candidates are taken from "Final tally shows size of victory in Longueuil," Montreal Gazette, November 6, 1986, V1.

Jacques Finet resigned as mayor on April 16, 1987, to take a vice-president's job at Hydro-Quebec. A by-election to choose his successor was held on May 30, 1987.

Electoral District	Position	Total valid votes	Candidates			Incumbent
Electoral District	Position	Total valid votes	Parti municipal	Independent	Independent	Incumbent
	Mayor	25,961	Roger Ferland; 18,596 (71.63%)	Jacques Olivier; 7,035 (27.10%)	Jacques Gendron; 330 (1.27%)	

Source: James Mennie, "Ferland whips ex-MP to win Longueuil mayoralty," Montreal Gazette, June 1, 1987, A3.
