= Union municipale de Saint-Léonard =

The Union municipale de Saint-Léonard (UMSL) was a municipal political party in the suburban community of Saint-Leonard in Montreal, Quebec, Canada, during the early to mid-1980s.

The UMSL was formed prior to the 1982 municipal election, in which it fielded Jean Desjardins as its mayoral candidate and a full slate of twelve candidates for city council. Desjardins finished second against incumbent Antonio di Ciocco of the governing Équipe du renouveau de la cité de Saint-Léonard. Two of the UMSL's candidates, Tommaso Nanci and Remi Boyer, were returned to council.

Rosario Ortona became the UMSL's leader after the 1982 election and was its mayoral candidate in a 1984 by-election that was called after di Ciocco's unexpected death. He finished third against Raymond Renaud of the newly formed Ralliement de Saint-Léonard. The UMSL also contested an April 1985 by-election, with a candidate who was narrowly defeated by a member of Renaud's party.

Nanci and Boyer resigned from the UMSL in July 1985 to sit as independents, saying that they intended to form a new party that would better represent Saint-Leonard's merchant community. Ortona criticized this decision, saying that they could have pursued the same goal within the UMSL. Nanci and Boyer subsequently joined the Unité de Saint-Léonard party while Ortona ultimately dissolved the UMSL to join the Rassemblement des citoyens et citoyennes de Saint-Léonard. All three were defeated by candidates of Renaud's party in the 1986 municipal election.
