= Action civique de Saint-Léonard =

Political party in Quebec, Canada

Action civique de Saint-Léonard was a municipal political party that existed from 1984 to 1986 in the suburban community of Saint-Leonard in Montreal, Quebec, Canada. The party claimed more than five hundred members in March 1986 and held one seat on the Saint-Leonard city council.

The party emerged from a split in the governing Équipe du renouveau de la cité de Saint-Léonard party the followed mayor Antonio di Ciocco's death in July 1984. Domenico Moschella formed Action civique, while his leadership rival Raymond Renaud formed the Ralliement de Saint-Léonard. Renaud defeated Moschella in a mayoral by-election later in the year and was able to form a new municipal administration. In the aftermath of this political restructuring, Moschella was only city councillor to serve with the Action civique party. Action civique also fielded Vittorio Galerio as a candidate in an April 1985 council by-election; he finished third.

After the 1985 by-election, Moschella called for a united opposition party to challenge Renaud's administration in the next general election. He helped form the new Unité de Saint-Léonard party in October 1986 and wound down Action civique shortly thereafter.
