= Pierre Journet =

Canadian judge

Pierre Journet is a justice of the Quebec Superior Court. He was appointed for the Laval district on 9 May 1995 by an order of Canadian attorney-general Allan Rock.

== Notable decisions ==
In 2006, Journet ruled that former Montreal city councillor Kettly Beauregard did not have a contract to work as former mayor Pierre Bourque's political assistant after the 2001 municipal election. Beauregard was Bourque's alternate candidate for a council seat in the election, and was obliged to stand down after Bourque was defeated in the mayoral contest. Beauregard worked for Bourque in 2002, but later sued him for failing to honour what she said was an oral promise for an assistant's job valued at $57,000 per year. Journet ruled that Beauregard's work was voluntary, as she was still being paid for the 1998–2002 council mandate that was cut short by the post-merger 2001 election.

Journet approved the Remstar corporation's purchase of the private television channel TQS in 2008.

In 2010, Journet awarded former Member of the National Assembly (MNA) William Cusano $25,000 in a defamation suit against Basilio Giordano and the Italian language paper Il Cittadino Canadese. The paper printed an anonymous letter during the Liberal Party of Canada's 2007 nomination contest in Papineau which alleged that Cusano was supporting a "non-Italian" (i.e., Justin Trudeau) in return for the promise of a patronage job. The letter also made the false suggestion that Cusano had "a tendency toward alcohol". Journet ruled that the letter was "false and defamatory" and that Giordano had become a co-author by changing its content before publication.
