= Raymond Renaud =

Canadian mayor

Raymond Renaud was a politician in Montreal, Quebec, Canada. He was mayor of the suburban community of Saint-Leonard from 1984 to 1990, leading the municipal Ralliement de Saint-Léonard party.

== Councillor ==
Renaud was first elected as a Saint-Leonard councillor in 1978. He was re-elected in 1982 as a member of mayor Antonio di Ciocco's Équipe du renouveau de la cité de Saint-Léonard. This group dissolved after Di Ciocco's death, and Renaud formed the Ralliement de Saint-Léonard as a successor party.

== Mayor ==
=== First term ===
Renaud was elected as mayor of Saint-Leonard in September 1984, winning a by-election that followed di Ciocco's death. This election was extremely divisive, dominated by a rival candidate's charge that the city had acted improperly in a land purchase; after the vote, Renaud filed libel suits against both of his opponents. Renaud's newly formed Ralliement de Saint-Léonard became the majority party on council in this period, including in its ranks many former members of the defunct Renewal Party.

Shortly after assuming office, Renaud fired his personal secretary on the grounds that she had campaigned for one of his opponents. A Quebec Superior Court judge later ruled that this decision was unjust.

As mayor, Renaud promoted a new arts centre and a renovation project for Jean Talon Street. He reluctantly accepted the city’s decision to withdraw from both projects in June 1985, acknowledging that it had been a mistake to move forward without the provincial government's guarantee of support. He supported a revised Jean Talon Street project, less expensive than the original, later in the same year.

=== Second term ===
Renaud was re-elected in the 1986 municipal election, defeating three rivals as his Ralliement de Saint-Léonard party won 10 of 12 seats on council. On election night, Renaud was quoted as saying "The opposition? There is no opposition in St. Leonard." He served a four-year term as mayor and was second vice-president of the regional Montreal Urban Community in 1989–90.

There was a significant protest against Saint-Leonard's tax policies in early 1987. In May 1987, Renaud acknowledged that the city had overtaxed businesses by over one million dollars the previous year and indicated that he would seek redress for the matter.

Renaud lost his council majority in May 1988, when Frank Zampino and seven other Ralliement de Saint-Léonard councillors resigned to sit as independents. The rebels accused Renaud of running the city in an undemocratic fashion, while Renaud responded that the split was due to jealousy and accused his rivals of letting outside forces run the city. Zampino's group established a priority committee to study documents before they were approved by council, and Renaud and Zampino fought for dominance of the municipal government over the next two years.

Zampino defeated Renaud by about four thousand votes in the 1990 municipal election. Renaud did not seek a return to political life after this time.

== Federal and provincial politics ==
Renaud actively supported the Quebec Liberal Party's victory in the 1985 provincial election, arguing that the Liberals would be more amenable to supporting projects in Saint-Leonard than was the previous Parti Québécois government.

In the 1988 Canadian federal election, Renaud supported the Progressive Conservative candidate in Saint-Léonard.

== Electoral record ==
1990 Saint-Leonard municipal election: Mayor
Party	Candidate	Votes	%
Parti Municipal	Frank Zampino	14,461	58.04
Ralliement de Saint-Léonard	(x)Raymond Renaud	10,455	41.96
Total valid votes		24,916	100
Source: Irwin Block, "St. Leonard votes for change as Cote St. Luc re-elects Lang," Montreal Gazette, 5 November 1990, A5.

1986 Saint-Leonard municipal election: Mayor
Party	Candidate	Votes	%
Ralliement de Saint-Léonard	(x)Raymond Renaud	11,374	44.30
Unité de Saint-Léonard	Tony Iammatteo	8,304	32.34
Équipe démocratique de Saint-Léonard	Andre Bastien	3,218	12.53
Rassemblement des citoyens et citoyennes de Saint-Léonard	Rosario Nobile	2,778	10.82
Total valid votes		25,674	100
Source: "Results of council elections in 18 Montreal-area municipalities," Montreal Gazette, 3 November 1986, A8.

Saint-Leonard municipal by-election, 30 September 1984: Mayor
Party	Candidate	Votes	%
Ralliement de Saint-Léonard	Raymond Renaud	10,307	48.57
Action civique de Saint-Léonard	Domenico Moschella	5,568	26.24
Union municipale de Saint-Léonard	Rosario Ortona	5,348	25.20
Total valid votes		21,223	100
Sources: Il Settimanale, 11 September 1984; Montreal Gazette, 1 October 1984.

1982 Saint-Leonard municipal election: Councillor, Ward Five
Party	Candidate	Votes	%
Équipe du renouveau de la cité de Saint-Léonard	Raymond Renaud (incumbent)	970	44.62
Union municipale de Saint-Léonard	Pasquale Buttino	622	28.61
Parti de l'alliance municipale	Michel Morin	582	26.77
Total valid votes		2,174	100
Source: Le Journal de Saint-Léonard, 9 November 1982, pp. 2-4.
