= Saint-Leonard borough council =

Saint-Leonard Borough Council

Type
- Type: Unicameral

Leadership
- Mayor: Dominic Perri, Ensemble Montréal since November 2025

Structure
- Seats: 4 councillors and mayor
- Political groups: Government (4) Ensemble Montréal (4) Other parties (1) Équipe St-Léonard (1)

Elections
- Voting system: First-past-the-post
- Last election: 2 November 2025

Website
- https://montreal.ca/saint-leonard

The Saint-Leonard borough council is the local governing body of Saint-Leonard, a borough in the City of Montreal. The council consists of five members: the borough mayor (who also serves as a Montreal city councillor), two Montreal city councillors and two borough councillors elected for Saint-Leonard's two electoral districts. Each citizen of Saint-Léonard has four votes in a municipal election: one for the mayor of Montreal, one for the borough mayor, one for a city councillor, and one for a borough councillor. Voters may choose to cast all four votes or as few as they wish.

The borough council, like others in Montreal, is able to approve some contracts without seeking the approval of the Montreal executive committee or the Montreal city council. A Montreal Gazette article from May 2009 indicated that Saint-Leonard was paying more expenditures since dividing its management of parks and sports facilities into two twenty-year contracts.

== Make up of Borough council ==
Saint-Leonard is divided into two council districts: Saint-Leonard-Est and Saint-Leonard-Ouest by Lacordaire Boulevard. The borough elects a borough mayor, who also sits on Montreal City Council; each district elects one city councillor and one borough councillor. The borough mayor, city councillors, and borough councillors make up the borough council.

District	Position	Name	Party
Borough of Saint-Léonard	Borough Mayor; City Councillor	Dominic Perri	Ensemble Montréal
Saint-Léonard-Est	City Councillor	Arij El Korbi	Ensemble Montréal
Saint-Léonard-Est	Borough Councillor	Linda Paquin	Ensemble Montréal
Saint-Léonard-Ouest	City Councillor	Mauro Barone	Équipe St-Léonard
Saint-Léonard-Ouest	Borough Councillor	Gemma Marchione	Ensemble Montréal

== 2025 Election ==
Borough Mayor Saint-Leonard

2025 Montreal municipal election: Borough Mayor Saint-Leonard
Party	Candidate	Votes	%	±%
Ensemble Montréal	Dominic Perri	6,355	44.64	-19.66
Équipe St-Léonard	Suzanne De Larochellière	5,842	41.01	new
Projet Montréal	Luckny Guerrier	1,373	9.64	-8.07
Independent	Pasqualino Borsellino	374	2.63	–
Independent	Philippe Tessier	292	2.05	–
Total valid votes/expense limit		14,236	94.59	
Total rejected ballots		813	5.40	+1.54
Turnout		15,049	30.17	-2.51
Eligible voters		49,878	–	–
Ensemble Montréal hold		Swing		-21.34

Saint-Leonard-Est

2025 Montreal municipal election: City Councillor, Saint-Léonard-Est
Party	Candidate	Votes	%	±%
Ensemble Montréal	Arij El Korbi	2,913	44.09	-18.81
Équipe St-Léonard	Nathalie Vallée	2,483	37.58	new
Projet Montréal	Abdellah Azzouz	786	11.90	-4.98
Transition Montréal	Alexia Corsillo	425	6.43	new
Total valid votes/expense limit		6,607	93.93	
Total rejected ballots		427	6.07	+2.32
Turnout		7,034	31.03	-3.06
Eligible voters		22,670	–	–
Ensemble Montréal hold		Swing		–

2025 Montreal municipal election: Borough Councillor, Saint-Léonard-Est
Party	Candidate	Votes	%	±%
Ensemble Montréal	Linda Paquin	3,748	57.58	+8.82
Équipe St-Léonard	Amina Bahri	1,986	30.51	new
Projet Montréal	Loïc de Fabritus	775	11.91	-11.89
Total valid votes/expense limit		6,509	92.71	
Total rejected ballots		512	7.29	+1.38
Turnout		7,021	30.97	-3.13
Eligible voters		22,670	–	–
Ensemble Montréal hold		Swing		–

Saint-Leonard-Ouest

2025 Montreal municipal election: City Councillor, Saint-Léonard-Ouest
Party	Candidate	Votes	%	±%
Équipe St-Léonard	Mauro Barone	3,358	44.64	new
Ensemble Montréal	Gabriel Retta	3,058	40.65	-16.90
Projet Montréal	Rose Camille	827	10.99	-8.79
Transition Montréal	Amy McAloon	280	3.72	new
Total valid votes/expense limit		7,523	93.35	
Total rejected ballots		536	6.65	+2.36
Turnout		8,059	29.62	-2.02
Eligible voters		27,208	–	–
Équipe St-Léonard gain		Swing		–

2025 Montreal municipal election: Borough Councillor, Saint-Léonard-Ouest
Party	Candidate	Votes	%	±%
Ensemble Montréal	Gemma Marchione	3,421	45.81	+0.07
Équipe St-Léonard	Francesco Lavalle	3,172	42.47	new
Projet Montréal	Edline Henri	875	11.72	-8.20
Total valid votes/expense limit		7,468	92.87	
Total rejected ballots		573	7.13	+2.84
Turnout		8,041	29.55	-2.09
Eligible voters		27,208	–	–
Ensemble Montréal hold		Swing		–
