= Rassemblement des citoyens et citoyennes de Saint-Léonard =

The Rassemblement des citoyens et citoyennes de Saint-Léonard (RCSL) was a short-lived municipal political party in the suburban community of Saint-Leonard in Montreal, Quebec, Canada. The party was created in June 1985 by Rosario Nobile, a thirty-five-year-old lawyer who had previously run for council in 1982 as a candidate of the Union municipale de Saint-Léonard (UMSL).

Saint-Leonard was governed by Raymond Renaud's Ralliement de Saint-Léonard in the mid-1980s, and three other opposition parties were already operating in the city when the RCSL was founded. Nobile initially said that he was open to merging his group with the other parties, but he later changed his position, saying, "If they're honorable, they should come with me, because they have nobody." Domenico Moschella, the leader of the rival Action civique de Saint-Léonard, "This guy thinks he's God's gift to humanity [...] If anything, he should join us - not us join him." This exchange notwithstanding, Nobile's party won the support of UMSL leader Rosario Ortona, who dissolved his party to join the new organization.

Nobile was the RCSL's mayoral candidate in the 1986 Saint-Leonard municipal election, and the party fielded a full slate of candidates for the city's twelve council districts. Nobile described his party as a grassroots organization, likening it to Jean Doré's Montreal Citizens' Movement in the city of Montreal; of the RCSL's candidates, only Ortona had prior experience as an elected official. Almost all of the party's candidates were Italian Canadians, and Nobile said that he would both enhance French- and English-language services and encourage the hiring of city employees who were fluent in Italian.

Shortly before election day, Nobile predicted the RCSL would win every seat on council. In the event, he finished fourth the mayoral contest and the party failed to win any seats. It seems to have disappeared shortly after the election.
