= Michel Bissonnet =

Canadian politician (born 1942)

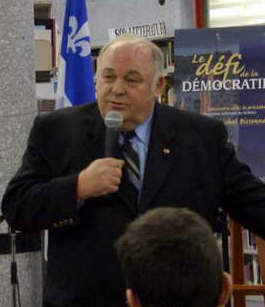

Borough mayor for Saint-Leonard and Montreal City Councillor
- In office September 21, 2008 – November 2, 2025
- Preceded by: Frank Zampino
- Succeeded by: Dominic Perri

MNA for Jeanne-Mance–Viger
- In office April 14, 2003 – September 24, 2008
- Preceded by: first member
- Succeeded by: Filomena Rotiroti

42nd President of the National Assembly of Quebec
- In office June 4, 2003 – July 14, 2008
- Preceded by: Louise Harel
- Succeeded by: François Gendron

MNA for Jeanne-Mance
- In office April 13, 1981 – April 14, 2003
- Preceded by: Henri Laberge
- Succeeded by: riding dissolved

Mayor of Saint-Leonard
- In office November 12, 1978 – April 13, 1981
- Preceded by: Jean Di Zazzo
- Succeeded by: Antonio di Ciocco

Personal details
- Born: March 28, 1942 (age 84) Montreal, Quebec
- Party: Quebec Liberal Party (provincial); Union Montreal (2008-2013); Independent (2013); Ensemble Montréal (2013-)
- Profession: Attorney
- Cabinet: President of the National Assembly of Québec

Michel Bissonnet (French pronunciation: [miʃɛl bisɔnɛ]; born March 28, 1942) is a Canadian politician who served as Liberal member of the National Assembly as well as President (Speaker) of the National Assembly of Quebec. He also served as the mayor and city councillor of Saint-Leonard a borough of Montreal.

== Background ==
Bissonnet obtained a licence in law at Université de Montréal in 1976 and was admitted to the Barreau du Québec the following year. Prior to his years as a lawyer, he worked for the City of Montreal for 17 years in various positions including archivist and assistant office manager.

== Early political career ==
Bissonnet was formerly involved in the federal New Democratic Party and its Quebec wing, the defunct Nouveau Parti démocratique du Québec. He was a candidate in the 1967 federal by-election for that party in the district of Papineau. He finished third with 15 per cent of the vote. Liberal candidate André Ouellet was elected.

== City politics ==
He ran as an Action Laval candidate for the city council of Laval in 1969 and served as mayor for the city of Saint-Léonard from 1978 to 1981.

== Member of the Provincial Legislature ==
Bissonnet successfully ran as the Liberal candidate in the district of Jeanne-Mance in the 1981 election. He was re-elected in the 1985, 1989, 1994 and 1998 elections. He also won re-election in the merged district of Jeanne-Mance–Viger in 2003 and 2007. After 27 years in the National Assembly, he stepped down in mid-2008 as both President of the National Assembly and MNA to run for borough mayor of Saint-Leonard in that year's by-election.

== Speaker ==
He served as Vice-President of the National Assembly during his third term of office from 1989 to 1994, Assistant Whip of the Opposition from 1994 to 1997 and Third Vice-President of the National Assembly during his fifth term from 1999 to 2003. He became the President of the National Assembly (Speaker of the House) after the Liberal victory in 2003. In 2007, Bissonnet was reconfirmed as President of the National Assembly.

== Borough Mayor ==
In July 2008, Bissonnet announced that he would leave provincial politics and run again for the mayoral position of Saint-Léonard, now a borough of Montreal following the 2002 amalgamation. He had become the longest serving MNA of the 38th National Assembly, even though he had never been appointed to the Cabinet.

Bissonnet ran under Montreal Mayor Gérald Tremblay's Union Montreal label. An election had been called to fill the position in the aftermath of the resignation of Frank Zampino. Bissonnet was elected with 94.3 per cent of the vote in September 2008, against Livio DiCelmo of Projet Montréal. He was re-elected in the 2009 municipal elections.

In the 2013 Montreal municipal elections, he was re-elected borough mayor of Saint-Léonard under Équipe Denis Coderre. He was re-elected in 2017 and in 2021 as well. He consistently got more than 64% of the vote in each election. He announced in late June 2025 that he would not be running for sixth term as borough mayor. He cited health reasons and his age as a few factors for his decision. He is the longest-serving mayor in Saint-Leonard’s history, with a total of 20 years in office; 17 as borough mayor and 3 as mayor of the former independent city.

== Provincial electoral record (incomplete) ==
Jeanne-Mance–Viger

2007 Quebec general election: Jeanne-Mance–Viger
Party	Candidate	Votes	%	±%
Liberal	Michel Bissonnet	20,716	68.00	
Action démocratique	Carole Giroux	4,565	14.98	
Parti Québécois	Kamal El Batal	3,659	12.01	
Green	Hamadou Abdel Kader Nikiema	790	2.59	
Québec solidaire	Ramon Villaruel	635	2.08	
Marxist–Leninist	Stéphane Chénier	101	0.33	
Total valid votes		30,466	100.00	
Rejected and declined votes		349		
Turnout		30,815	63.26	
Electors on the lists		48,710		
Source: Official Results, Le Directeur général des élections du Québec.

2003 Quebec general election
Party	Candidate	Votes	%	±%
Liberal	Michel Bissonnet	26801	79.89	
Parti Québécois	Robert La Rose	4303	12.83	
Action démocratique	Carole Giroux	2080	6.20	
Bloc Pot	Eddy Guarino	365	1.09	

Jeanne-Mance

1998 Quebec general election
Party	Candidate	Votes	%	±%
Liberal	Michel Bissonnet	22669	77.31	
Parti Québécois	Robert La Rose	4779	16.30	
Action démocratique	Jean-François Pelletier	1596	5.44	
Equality	Peter Margo	139	0.47	
Socialist Democracy	Stéphane Simard	78	0.27	
Parti innovateur du Québec	Jean Yves Thorne	62	0.21	

1994 Quebec general election
Party	Candidate	Votes	%	±%
Liberal	Michel Bissonnet	21294	74.22	
Parti Québécois	Jean Emmanuel Charlot	6534	22.77	
Parti innovateur du Québec	Monique Robillard	540	1.88	
Natural Law	Ronald L'Italien	322	1.12	

1989 Quebec general election
Party	Candidate	Votes	%	±%
Liberal	Michel Bissonnet	17296	65.06	
Parti Québécois	Louise Brouillet	6959	26.18	
Equality	Tony Cipriani	1930	7.26	
Parti des travailleurs du Québec	Serge Laurenzi	399	1.50	

1985 Quebec general election
Party	Candidate	Votes	%	±%
Liberal	Michel Bissonnet	20772	70.24	
Parti Québécois	Marielle Laberge	13472	25.33	
Progressive Conservative	Michel Denis	609	2.06	
New Democratic Party	Vincent Guadagnano	411	1.39	
Union Nationale	Roland Thibault	150	0.51	
Socialist Movement	Antonio Vitale	100	0.34	
Christian Socialist	Daniel Malboeuf	40	0.13	

1981 Quebec general election
Party	Candidate	Votes	%	±%
Liberal	Michel Bissonnet	19652	58.65	
Parti Québécois	Henri Laberge	13472	40.20	
Union Nationale	Vincenza Pennestri-Gauthier	385	1.15	

== Federal electoral record ==
1967 Papineau By-election

Canadian federal by-election, 29 May 1967
Party	Candidate	Votes	%	±%
On Mr. Favreau's resignation, 4 April 1967
Liberal	André Ouellet	6,197	57.97	+4.87
Progressive Conservative	Raymond Rochon	1,958	18.32	+1.25
New Democratic	Michel Bissonnet	1,568	14.67	+1.21
Radical chrétien	Albert Paiement	702	6.57	
Independent	Albert Cameron	265	2.48	+0.42
Total valid votes		10,690	100.00	

== Municipal record ==
Borough Mayor Saint-Leonard

2021 Montreal municipal election: Borough Mayor Saint-Leonard
Party	Candidate	Votes	%	±%
Ensemble Montréal	Michel Bissonnet	10,016	64.30	-0.31
Mouvement Montréal	Lili-Anne Tremblay	2,802	17.99	new
Projet Montréal	Nerlande Gaetan	2,759	17.71	-12.76
Total valid votes/expense limit		15,577	96.14	
Total rejected ballots		625	3.86	-0.88
Turnout		16,200	32.68	-4.74
Eligible voters		49,574	–	–

2017 Montreal municipal election: Borough Mayor Saint-Leonard
Party	Candidate	Votes	%	±%
Équipe Denis Coderre	Michel Bissonnet	11,651	64.61	-1.08
Projet Montréal	Julie Caron	5,495	30.47	+16.44
Independent	Tommaso Di Paola	888	4.92	
Total valid votes/expense limit		18,034	95.26	
Total rejected ballots		898	4.74	-2.54
Turnout		18,931	37.42	+0.09
Eligible voters		50,593	–	–

2013 Montreal municipal election: Borough Mayor Saint-Leonard
Party	Candidate	Votes	%	±%
Équipe Denis Coderre	Michel Bissonnet	10,938	65.69	-4.03
Projet Montréal	Cyrille Giraud	2,336	14.03	+4.67
Coalition Montréal	Dominic Talarico	2,282	13.70	new
Intégrité Montréal	Sabrina D'Avirro	1,096	6.58	new
Total valid votes/expense limit		16,652	92.71	–
Total rejected ballots		1,310	7.29	+2.25
Turnout		17,960	37.33	-1.58
Eligible voters		48,112	–	–

2009 Montreal municipal election: Borough Mayor Saint-Leonard
Party	Candidate	Votes	%	±%
Union Montreal	Michel Bissonnet	12,449	69.72	-8.48
Vision Montreal	Vittorio Capparelli	2,035	11.40	-10.40
Action civique	Italo Barone	1,868	10.46	new
Projet Montréal	Nicolas Marchildon	1,325	7.42	new
Independent	David Mallozzi	179	1.00	–
Total valid votes/expense limit		17,856	94.96	
Total rejected ballots		947	5.04	N/A
Turnout		18,803	38.91	
Eligible voters		48,325	–	–

Saint-Leonard municipal by-election, 21 September 2008: Mayor
Party	Candidate	Votes	%
Union Montreal	Michel Bissonnet	11,450	94.32
Projet Montréal	Livio Di Celmo	308	2.54
Vision Montreal	Mélina Maiorano	271	2.23
Independent	David Mallozzi	110	0.91
Total valid votes		12,139	100
Source: Official results - Saint-Léonard borough, Septembre 21, 2008, City of Montreal, accessed 14 August 2011.

== See also ==
- National Assembly of Quebec
- Politics of Quebec

== Footnotes ==
National Assembly of Quebec
Preceded by Louise Harel (PQ)	President of the National Assembly of Quebec; 2003-2008	Succeeded by François Gendron
Preceded by Jean-Pierre Saintonge (Liberal); Louise Bégin (Liberal)	Deputy President of the National Assembly of Quebec; 1989-1994; With: Lawrence Cannon (Liberal) (1989-1990), Roger Lefebvre (Liberal) (1990-1994) and Michel Tremblay (Liberal) (1994-1994)	Succeeded by Pierre Bélanger (PQ); Raymond Brouillet (PQ)
Preceded by Raymond Brouillet (PQ); Claude Pinard (PQ)	Deputy President of the National Assembly of Quebec; 1999-2003; With: Raymond Brouillet (PQ) (1999-2003), Claude Pinard (PQ) (1999-2002) and François Beaulne (PQ) (2002-2003)	Succeeded by Christos Sirros (Liberal); Diane Leblanc (Liberal); François Gendron (PQ)
Political offices
Preceded by Jean Di Zazzo	Mayor of Saint-Léonard; 1978-1981	Succeeded by Antonio Di Ciocco
Preceded by Frank Zampino (Union Montreal)	Mayor of the Borough of Saint-Léonard, Montreal; 2008–2025	Succeeded by Dominic Perri
