= Unité de Saint-Léonard =

Political party in Montreal, Québec, Canada

Unité de Saint-Léonard was a municipal political party that operated from 1986 to 1987 in the suburban community of Saint-Leonard in Montreal, Quebec, Canada. It was led by millionaire Montreal entrepreneur Tony Iammatteo, who was also its mayoral candidate in the 1986 municipal election.

The Unité party was introduced at a press conference held on September 24, 1986, at a shoe factory owned by Iammatteo. Incumbent opposition councillors Domenico Moschella, Tommaso Nanci, and Remi Boyer were present for the announcement, and all three officially joined the party shortly thereafter. Moschella was formerly the leader of Action civique de Saint-Léonard, while Nanci and Boyer had served with the Union Municipale de Saint-Léonard party.

The party ran a full slate of candidates in the 1986 municipal election. Iammatteo finished second against incumbent mayor Raymond Renaud, whose Ralliement de Saint-Léonard party took ten of twelve council seats. Giuseppe Fargnoli, who ran in the city's first ward, was the only Unité candidate elected; Moschella, Nanci, and Boyer were all defeated by relatively narrow margins.

Unité played a prominent role in a high-profile Saint-Leonard tax protest in early 1987, though it seems to have disappeared as an active force after this time.
