= Équipe du renouveau de la cité de Saint-Léonard =

The Équipe du renouveau de la cité de Saint-Léonard (English: Municipal Renewal Party of Saint-Leonard) was a political party based in the suburban community of Saint-Leonard in Montreal, Quebec, Canada. It existed from 1978 to 1984, and was the dominant party in Saint-Leonard during this time.

The party was founded by Michel Bissonnet, who served as mayor of Saint-Leonard from 1978 until 1981, when he was elected to the National Assembly of Quebec as a Liberal Party candidate. Antonio di Ciocco became party leader after Bissonnet's departure and was elected mayor in a 1981 by-election. Di Ciocco was re-elected in the 1982 municipal general election, and the party won nine out of twelve seats.

Di Coccio died in 1984, at which time the party split into two factions. Raymond Renaud formed the Ralliement de Saint-Léonard party, while his rival Dominic Moschella formed Action civique de Saint-Léonard.
