= Frank Zampino =

Chairman Frank Zampino

City Councillor for Saint-Leonard Ward 3
- In office November 9, 1986 – November 4, 1990
- Preceded by: Domenico Moschella
- Succeeded by: Mario Battista

Mayor City of Saint-Leonard
- In office November 4, 1990 – December 31, 2001
- Preceded by: Raymond Renaud
- Succeeded by: position abolished

Borough mayor for Saint-Leonard and Montreal city councillor
- In office January 1, 2002 – May 20, 2008
- Preceded by: position created
- Succeeded by: Michel Bisonnet

Chairman of the Executive Committee
- In office 2001–2008
- Preceded by: Jean Fortier
- Succeeded by: Claude Dauphin
- Constituency: Saint-Leonard

Personal details
- Born: Montreal, Quebec
- Party: Union Montreal

Frank Zampino is a former Montreal politician and is a chartered accountant. He served as the Chairman of the executive committee of the Ville de Montréal and was the city's second-ranking official.

== Early life ==
In 1976, Zampino graduated from Laurier Macdonald High School, an English-language public school in the east end of Montreal.

== Career ==
=== Pre-merger ===
After studies in accountancy, Zampino served as City Councillor in Saint-Léonard from 1986 to 1990 and was elected Mayor of that city in 1990. He was re-elected without opposition in 1994 and 1998. From 1998 to 2000, Zampino was the president of the STCUM (Montreal's Transit Commission).

=== Post-merger ===
In the aftermath of the Province-Wide Municipal Merger of 2001-2002, Zampino joined Mayor Gérald Tremblay's Montreal Island Citizens Union municipal party. The organization is now known as Union Montreal.

In 2001, Zampino was elected to the city council of Montreal and as Mayor of the Borough of Saint-Léonard. Since then, he has served as chairman of the executive committee of the city of Montreal, responsible for finances at the city of Montreal, and as a member of the executive committee of the Montreal Metropolitan Community.

In January 2004, Zampino was appointed by Mayor Tremblay to preside over the committee on finance, administrative and corporate services and strategic management. This same year, Zampino served as the honorary president of the Montreal Open, the annual open golf tournament of Montreal.

In 2005, Zampino remained one of the campaign leaders of Mayor Gérald Tremblay's political team. His efforts paid off and Zampino was re-elected as city councillor and borough mayor and was re-confirmed as chairman of the executive committee. In November 2005, Zampino referred to the mayoral administration as "the Tremblay-Zampino administration."

== Retirement ==
On May 20, 2008, Zampino announced that he would retire from politics during the summer after his 22-year career. His resignation took effect on July 2, 2008. Executive Committee Vice-president Claude Dauphin succeeded him.

== Corruption scandal ==
Zampino has been linked to a scandal that has engulfed municipal politics across Quebec since 2009. The Charbonneau Commission heard testimony that Zampino received a trip from Paolo Catania in return for helping Catania acquire land from the city corporation in the east end of Montreal. On May 17, 2012, Zampino was charged with fraud, conspiracy and breach of trust after a two-and-a-half-year long investigation related to awarding municipal contracts. The Faubourg Contrecoeur fraud trial, presided by Quebec Court Judge Yvan Poulin alone, began in February 2016, but was delayed. On May 2, 2018, Zampino was acquitted of all charges.

== Honors ==
Zampino received the following:

- Knight of the Italian Republic from the Italian government, in 2003
- Fellow of the Ordre des comptables agréés du Québec, in 2004
- Fellow of the Chartered Accountants

== See also ==
- Montreal Island Citizens Union

Preceded by Raymond Renaud	Mayor of Saint-Léonard, Montreal; 1990-2008	Succeeded by Michel Bissonnet
Political offices
Preceded by Jean Fortier (Vision Montreal)	Chairman of the Executive Committee; 2001-2008	Succeeded by Claude Dauphin (Union Montreal)
