= Ralliement de Saint-Léonard =

Former political party in Saint-Leonard, Quebec, Canada

The Ralliement de Saint-Léonard (RdSL) is a former political party in Saint-Leonard, Quebec, Canada. The RdSL existed prior to Saint-Leonard's amalgamation into Montreal and dominated the city's political life in the mid-1980s.

== Rise to political dominance ==
The RdSL was formed as a successor to the Équipe du renouveau de la cité de Saint-Léonard of mayor Antonio di Ciocco, who died in 1984. Party founder Raymond Renaud won the city's mayoralty in a September 1984 by-election, and the party held eight out of twelve council seats in 1985.

Reneaud was re-elected as Saint-Leonard's mayor in the 1986 municipal election, and the party increased its representation to ten council seats. Following the election, Renaud was quoted as saying, "The opposition? There is no opposition in Saint-Leonard."

== Split and subsequent collapse ==
In 1988, councillor Frank Zampino led a rebellion in which he and seven other RdSL representatives resigned from the party to sit as independents. They accused Renaud of making decisions without consultation and were particularly opposed to a $1.5 million business tax surcharge that was meant to pay for a residential tax cut. Only two councillors, Basilio Giordano and Pari Montanaro, remained with Renaud's administration.

The dissident councillors formed a municipal priority committee, which submitted a budget in 1989, and a "Saint-Leonard Citizens' Committee" that was intended to give citizens more control over political matters. From 1988 to 1990, the city faced political gridlock between the mayor's office and Zampino's group.

Zampino defeated Renaud for the mayoralty in the 1990 municipal election, and the RdSL won only two council seats. The party effectively disappeared in March 1994, when the two remaining RdSL members joined Zampino's Parti Municipal.
