= Antonio di Ciocco =

Politician in Montreal, Quebec, Canada

Antonio di Ciocco (died July 1984) was a politician in Montreal, Quebec, Canada. He served as mayor of the suburban community of Saint-Leonard from 1981 to 1984 and was also chair of the Commission scolaire Jérôme-Le Royer from 1980 to 1983.

Di Ciocco was first elected as mayor of Saint-Leonard in a 1981 by-election, which was held after incumbent mayor Michel Bissonnet was elected to the National Assembly of Quebec. Di Ciocco was re-elected in the 1982 municipal election, in the course of which his Équipe du renouveau de la cité de Saint-Léonard won nine out of twelve seats on council. He was the target of a car bombing in 1983, an act that he described as political intimidation. No one was inside the vehicle at the time.

A street in the Parc-Garibali neighborhood was named after him

He died of leukemia in July 1984, at age thirty-three.
