= Saint-Leonard, Quebec =

Saint-Leonard
- Borough of Montreal
- Saint-Léonard (French)
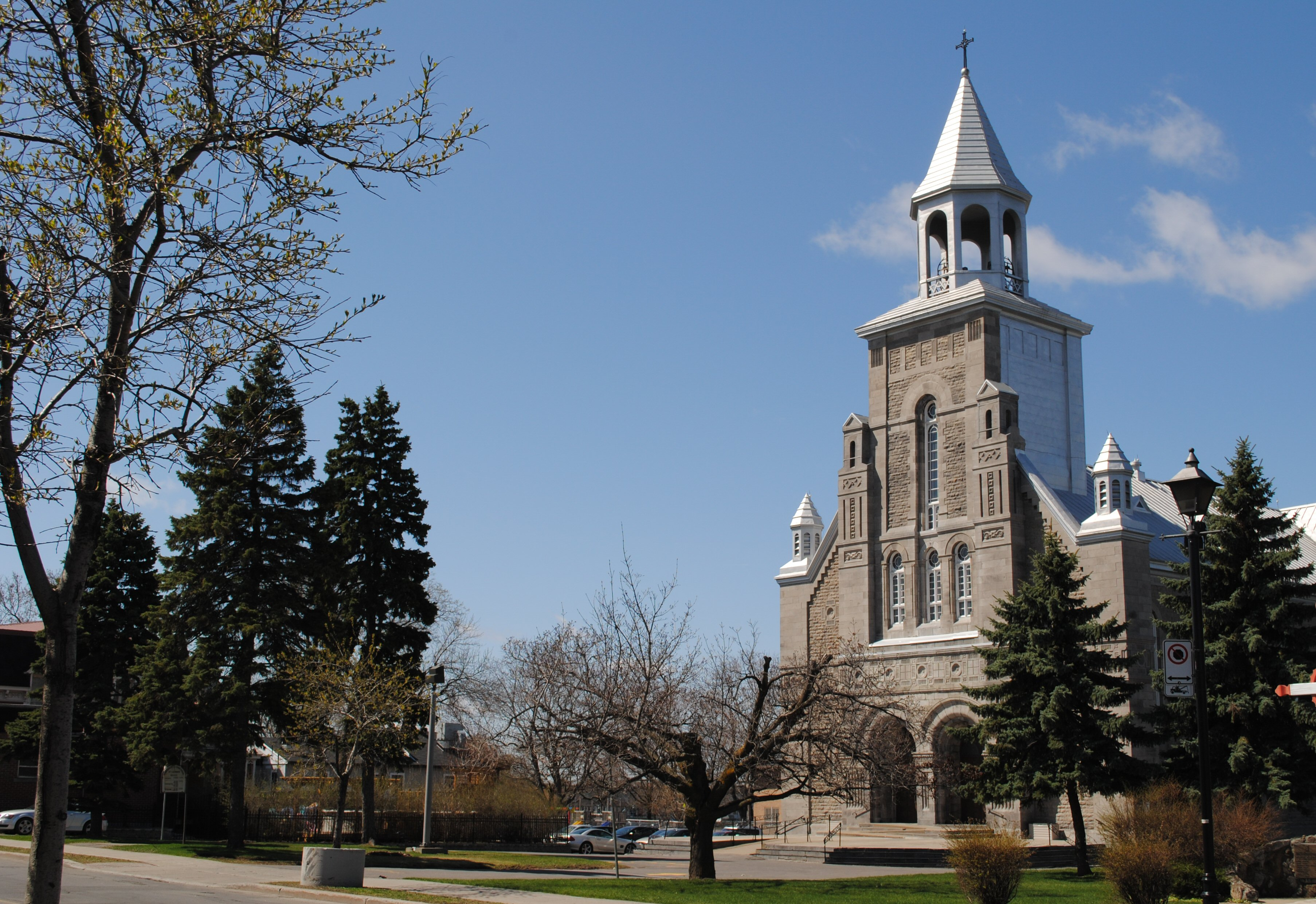
- Saint-Leonard church on Rue Jarry

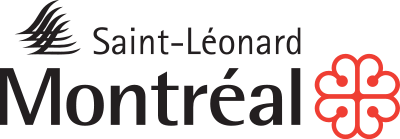

- Location in Montreal
- Coordinates: 45°35′09″N 73°35′46″W
- Country: Canada
- Province: Quebec
- City: Montreal
- Region: Montréal
- Merge into Montreal: January 1, 2002
- Electoral Districts Federal: Saint-Leonard—Saint-Michel; Honoré-Mercier
- Provincial: Jeanne-Mance–Viger

Government
  - Type: Borough
  - Mayor: Dominic Perri (Ensemble Montréal)
  - Federal MP(s): Patricia Lattanzio (LPC) Éric St-Pierre (LPC)
  - Quebec MNA(s): Filomena Rotiroti (PLQ)

Area
  - Land: 13.5 km^{2} (5.2 sq mi)

Population (2021)
  - Total: 79,495
  - Density: 5,893/km^{2} (15,260/sq mi)
  - Dwellings: 30,890
- Time zone: UTC−05:00 (EST)
  - Summer (DST): UTC−04:00 (EDT)
- Postal code(s): H1P, H1R, H1S
- Area codes: (514) and (438)
- Access Routes: A-40 (TCH)
- Website: Official website

Saint-Leonard (/ˈliːoʊnɑːrd/ LEE-oh-nard; French: Saint-Léonard [sɛ̃ leɔnaʁ]) is a borough (arrondissement) of Montreal, Quebec, Canada. Formerly a separate city, it was amalgamated into the city of Montreal in 2002. The former city was originally called Saint-Leonard de Port Maurice after Leonard of Port Maurice, an Italian saint. The borough is home to Montreal's Via Italia.

== Geography ==
Saint-Leonard is located in the northeastern part of the Island of Montreal. It is bordered by five boroughs: Montréal-Nord to the north and northwest, Anjou to the east, Mercier–Hochelaga-Maisonneuve to the southeast, Rosemont–La-Petite-Patrie to the south and Villeray–Saint-Michel–Parc-Extension to the southwest and west. Jean-Talon Street East (Rue Jean-Talon Est) traverses through the borough, connecting it to Villeray–Saint-Michel–Parc-Extension and Anjou.

== Features ==
=== Highways ===
Quebec Autoroute 40 (Autoroute Métropolitaine), part of the Trans-Canada Highway, traverses the area. Exits 76, 77 and 78 are in Saint-Leonard.

=== Public Transportation ===
Public transportation in Saint-Leonard is managed by the Société de transport de Montréal (STM). Saint-Leonard has an extensive bus network in the borough with a total of 14 bus routes. There are 12 daytime routes including two express routes and 2 night routes. The STM's 141 Jean-Talon Est bus serves Jean-Talon Street East, with buses taking off at every 10 minutes maximum during peak hours from Saint-Michel and Honoré-Beaugrand metro stations. The Mascouche Exo line runs through the borough and has a stop at Gare Saint-Léonard-Montréal-Nord. While lacking in a connection to the Metro system, the future Blue Line extension of the Montreal Metro, which is previewed to open in 2031, will have three stations located in Saint-Leonard, with all of them located along Jean-Talon Street East. The Projet structurant de l’Est (PSE) is a proposed light rail line and revitalization project of Montreal's end. The proposed route includes 31 stations spread over a 38-kilometer stretch with around 5 stations in the borough. No date for the completion of the project has been given.

=== Malls ===
Carrefour Langelier is a small-sized shopping mall located in Saint-Leonard, at the corner of Jean-Talon Street East and Langelier Boulevard. Saint-Leonard is also home to the Le Boulevard shopping centre, although a portion of the mall is actually located in Villeray–Saint-Michel–Parc-Extension.

=== Community Centre ===
An important English, French and Italian community centre, the Leonardo Da Vinci Centre (Centre Leonardo Da Vinci) is located along Lacordaire Boulevard, near Aréna Martin Brodeur.

== History ==
The parish of Saint-Leonard-de-Port-Maurice was founded in April 1886 and eventually became the City of Saint-Leonard-de-Port-Maurice on March 5, 1915. Saint-Leonard was traditionally a rural francophone hamlet with under a thousand people until the mid-twentieth century. The town became increasingly developed and urban throughout the twentieth century, benefiting from the expansion of the City of Montreal and a massive wave of Italian immigration which enriched life in the area with numerous cafes and restaurants. In 2016, the number of Italian Canadians in Saint-Leonard was 25,510. Maghrebis people make up a diverse group in the city; 3,900 people are of Berber ethnic origin and 3,770 people are of Arab ethnic origin. It is one of the most diverse and multi-cultural neighbourhoods on the Island of Montreal and about 49% of the population is foreign-born. Today, the Saint-Leonard has the 10th highest population of Montreal's 19 boroughs and is the 8th most densely populated borough.

== Italian Canadian presence ==
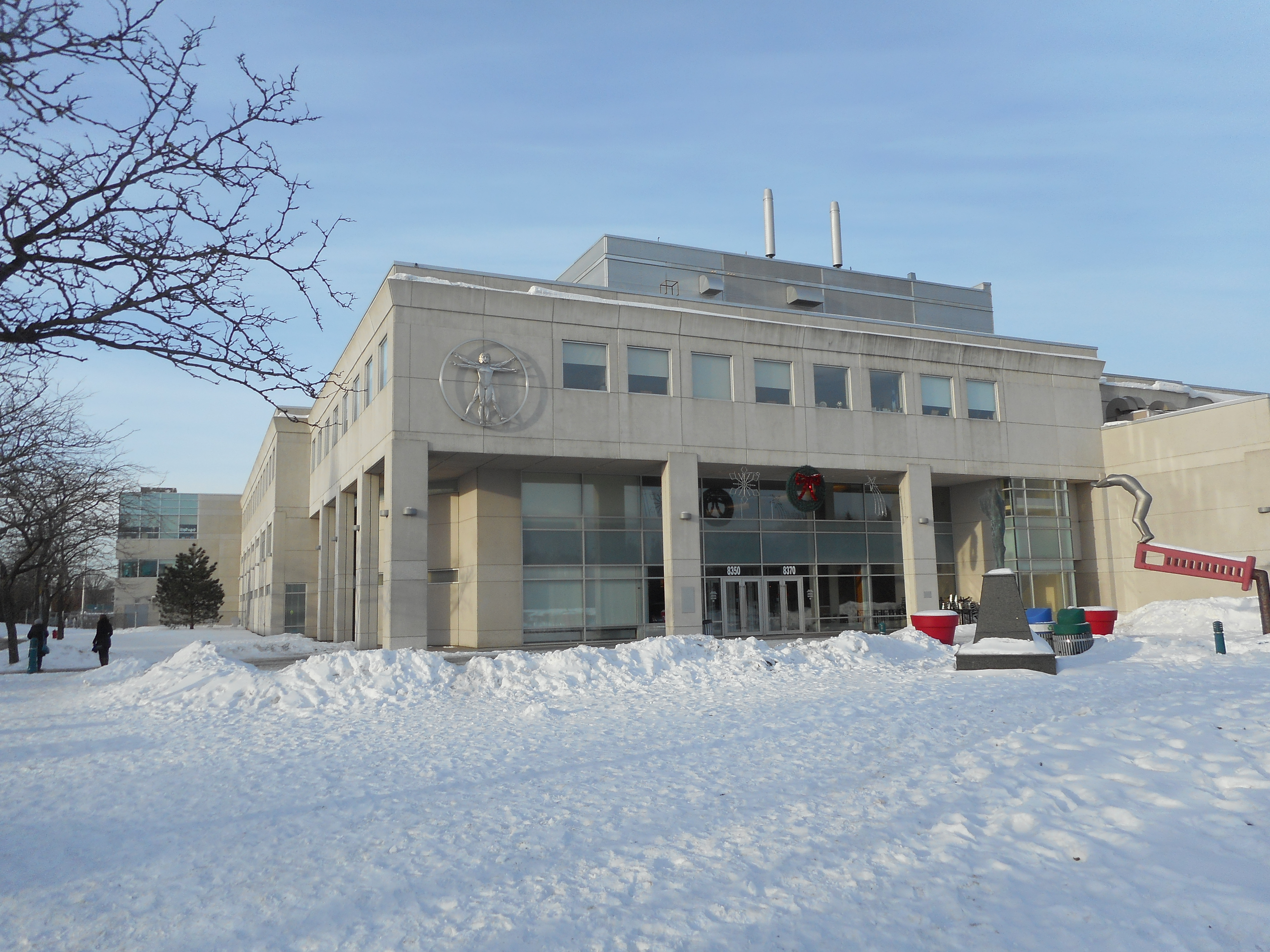
The Leonardo Da Vinci Centre

The borough has one of the highest concentrations of Italian Canadians in the city, along with Rivière-des-Prairies (RDP). As such, it has surpassed Montreal's rapidly gentrifying Little Italy as the centre for Italian culture in the city, with numerous cultural institutions and commercial enterprises serving the city's second-most populous cultural community. The stretch of Jean Talon Street between Langelier and Viau Boulevards has become known as Via Italia. By necessity, many services are available in Italian, English and French (the Leonardo da Vinci Centre, for instance, offers cultural activities and events in the three languages). The borough is characterized by its spacious, wide-set semi-detached brick duplexes (and triplexes, four-plexes, and five-plexes — an architectural style unique to Montreal), backyard vegetable gardens, Italian bars (cafés), and pastry shops serving Italian-Canadian staples such as cannoli, sfogliatelle, and zeppole. At some times of year, it is possible to observe seasonal Italian traditions like the making of wine, cheese, sausage, and tomato sauce in quantity. These activities bring extended families and neighbours together and often spill out into front driveways.

== Demographics ==
Historical populations
Year	Pop.	±%
1966	25,328	—
1971	52,035	+105.4%
1976	78,452	+50.8%
1981	79,429	+1.2%
1986	75,947	−4.4%
1991	73,120	−3.7%
1996	71,327	−2.5%
2001	69,604	−2.4%
2006	71,730	+3.1%
2011	75,707	+5.5%
2016	78,305	+3.4%

=== Home language (2016) ===
Language	Population	Percentage (%)
French	28,785	46%
English	14,125	22%
Other languages	22,365	34%

=== Mother Tongue (2016) ===
Language	Population	Percentage (%)
French	23,360	32%
English	5,810	8%
Other languages	43,340	60%

Visible Minorities (2016)
Ethnicity	Population	Percentage (%)
Not a visible minority	44,000	57.2%
Visible minorities	32,975	42.8%

=== Migration ===
Immigrants by country of birth (2016 Census)
Rank	Country	Population
1	Italy	10,405
2	Haiti	8,635
3	Algeria	8,475
4	Morocco	4,995
5	Vietnam	2,595
6	El Salvador	1,065
7	Peru	1,065
8	Portugal	965
9	Lebanon	900
10	Colombia	770

== Sports and recreation ==
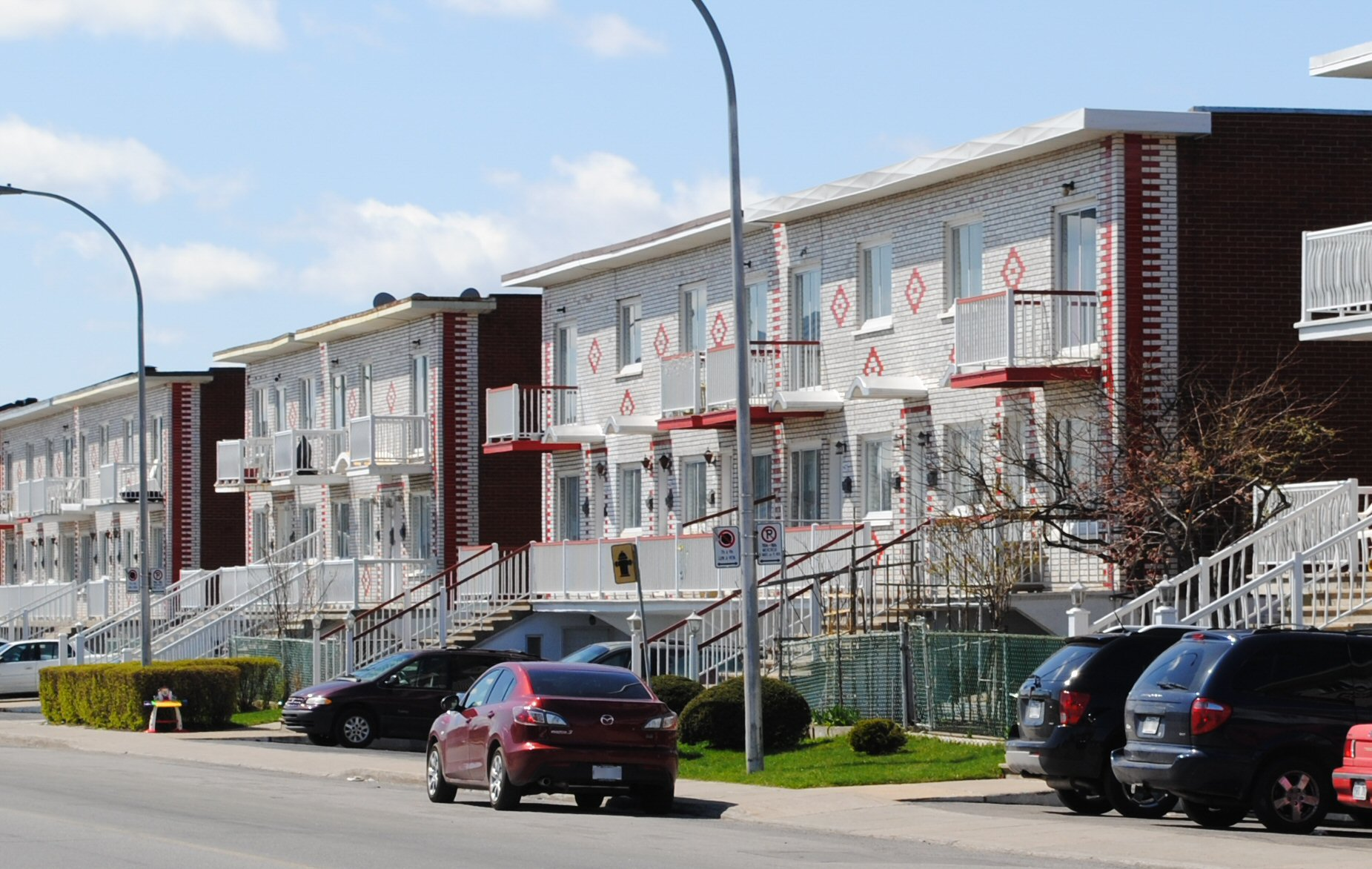
Typical housing in Saint-Leonard

=== Aquatics ===
The Saint-Leonard Aquatic Complex (French: Complexe aquatique de Saint-Leonard) was built in 2006 and is home to three swimming pools: one recreational basin, one 25-metre (82 ft) pool and one acclimation basin that includes a turbo bath spa. There are also two saunas, one for women and one for men.

=== Skate parks ===
Skaters can skate safely in the skate park located in Parc Delorme. Admission to the park is free, and it is open to the public May through October.

=== Cycling paths ===
Saint-Leonard has 10 km of bike paths around the borough, that connect various parks, pools and municipal structures. On November 1, 2022, the city of Montreal announced its Vision vélo 2023-2027 which plans to increase Montreal's cycling network by 200 km. This includes 2 REV (Réseau Express Vélo) routes passing through Saint-Leonard on Lacordaire Boulevard and the other on Jean-Talon Street. If all goes to plan this will be the first time that Saint-Leonard will be connected to the rest of the Montreal bike network.

A bike repair station is located next to the bike path on the Boulevard Robert entrance to Parc Wilfrid-Bastien.

=== Hockey ===
Saint-Léonard has two hockey arenas, Aréna Martin Brodeur, located on 5300 Boulevard Robert, and Aréna Roberto Luongo, located on 7755 Rue Colbert. These arenas host local games, and usually provide food, locker rooms, showers and public free-skating.

Saint-Léonard also has many outdoor hockey rinks in the winter. There are seven rinks set up before winter, and then they are iced when the temperature is appropriate. There was a delay of rink making in 2007 when the weather was warmer than usual.

=== Soccer ===
Soccer is a very popular sport for the youth in Saint-Léonard. Every large public park in Saint-Léonard has a soccer field open to the public.

=== Figure skating ===
Both Saint-Léonard arenas are used by the figure skating community. Many Olympic and World Champions have trained here in different disciplines like singles, pairs, dance and synchronized skating.

=== Other activities ===
The city has a domed football stadium, Stade Hébert, which is home to the Saint-Léonard Cougars of the CJFL football league.

There are bocce courts located at almost every public park.

There are two ping-pong tables located at Parc Delorme.

Saint-Léonard contains a cavern located at Pie XII Park.

Park	Basketball	Soccer	Bocce	Sledding	Fountain	Playground	Ice rink	Pavilion	Tennis	Swimming pool	Skate Park	Baseball	Shuffleboard	Pétanque	Spelunking
Pierre-de-Coubertin Park	x	x	x	x	x	x	x	x	x						
Pie-XII Park	x	x	x		x	x	x	x	x	x		x	x	x	x
Ladauversière Park	x	x	x		x	x	x	x	x	x		x			
Wilfrid-Bastien Park	x	x	x		x	x	x	x	x	x		x			
Delorme Park	x	x	x	x	x	x	x	x	x		x				
Ferland Park	x	x		x	x	x	x	x	x	x				x	
Giuseppe-Garibaldi Park		x				x		x		x		x			
Luigi-Pirandello Park		x		x		x		x	x	x					

== Education ==
=== Schools ===
Since the replacement of denominational (Catholic/Protestant) school boards with linguistic (French/English) ones, Saint-Léonard is served by one school board for the English schools and a school service centre for French schools. All French schools are part of the Centre de services scolaire de la Pointe-de-l'Île (CSSPÎ) while all English schools are part of the English Montreal School Board (EMSB).

The French language high school is École secondaire Antoine de Saint-Exupéry.

French language primary schools:

- Alphonse-Pesant
- Gabrielle-Roy
- La Dauversière
- Ferland
- Lambert-Closse
- Pie-XII
- Victor-Lavigne
- Wilfrid-Bastien
- Général Vanier

The English language secondary school is Laurier Macdonald High School

English language primary schools:

- Dante School
- Pierre de Coubertin School
- Honoré Mercier School

=== Public libraries ===
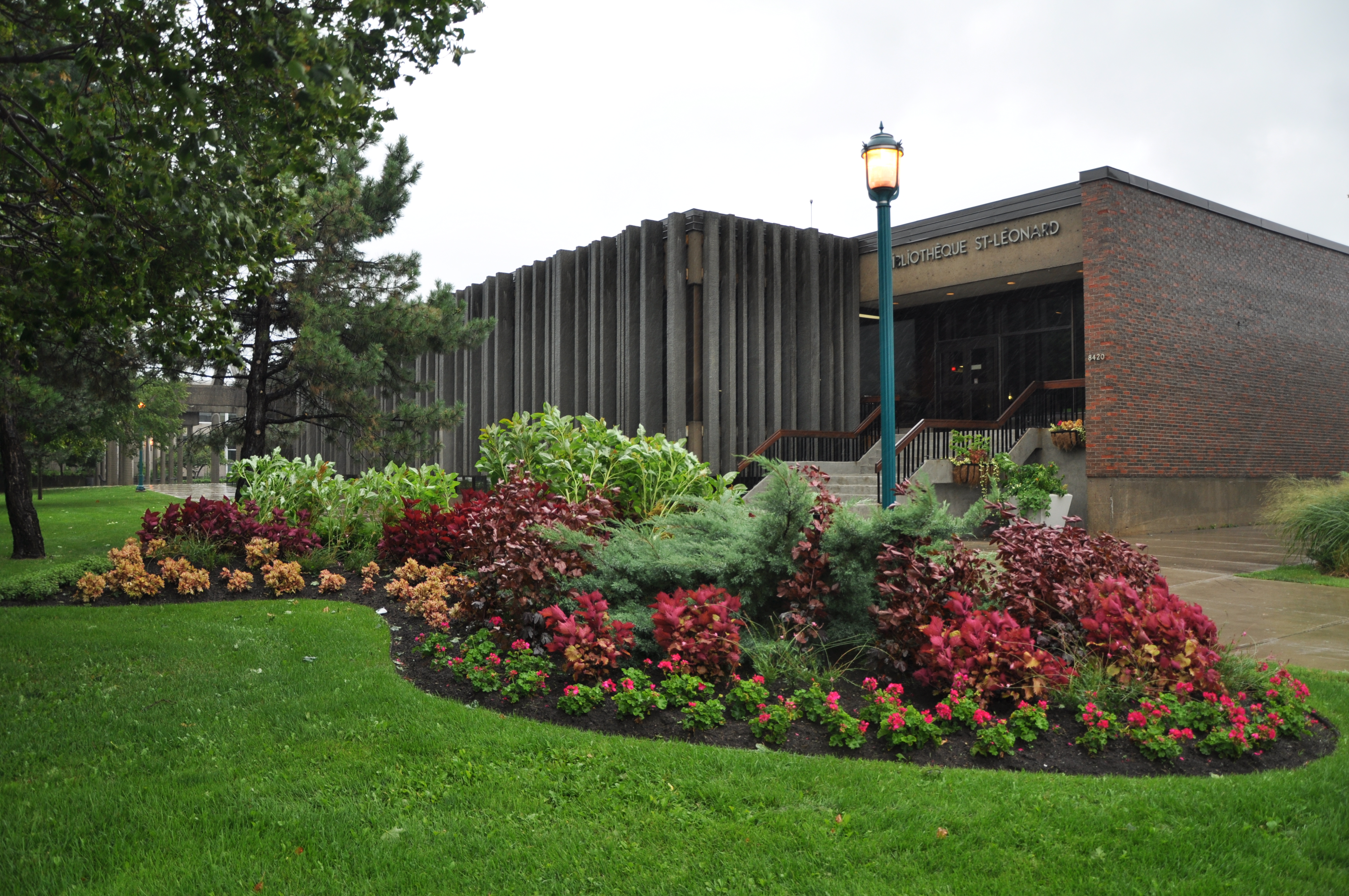
Saint-Léonard Library

The borough of Saint-Léonard's Library is part of the Montreal Public Libraries Network.

Saint-Léonard's first library opened in 1966, in a very modest house on Jarry Street. In 1974, the new city hall and current library were built side by side on Lacordaire Boulevard (photo to the right). Expanded in 1984, the library has modernized over the years and is home to the Port-Maurice Gallery.

== Government ==
=== Federal and Provincial Representation ===
Saint-Léonard leans heavily Liberal at both the provincial and federal levels. While at the municipal level it leans exclusively towards Ensemble Montréal.

Jeanne-Mance–Viger is the electoral district representing the borough of Saint-Léonard in the National Assembly in Quebec city. As of 2026, the MNA is Filomena Rotiroti from the QLP, first elected in 2008.

Saint-Léonard—Saint-Michel and Honoré-Mercier are the electoral districts representing Saint-Léonard in the House of Commons in Ottawa. During the 2022 redistribution a part of Saint-Leonard was redistributed into Honoré-Mercier. The current MPs Patricia Lattanzio and Éric St-Pierre are from the LPC first elected in 2019 and 2025 respectively.

=== Borough council ===
Saint-Léonard is divided by Lacordaire Boulevard into two city council districts, Saint-Léonard-Est and Saint-Léonard-Ouest. The borough elects a borough mayor, who also sits on Montreal City Council; each district elects one city councillor and one borough councillor. The borough mayor, city councillors, and borough councillors make up the borough council. As of the 2025 Montreal Municipal Election the borough Mayor, both borough councillors and one city councillor are from Ensemble Montréal while one city councillor is from Équipe St-Léonard.

District	Position	Name	Party
Borough of Saint-Léonard	Borough Mayor; City Councillor	Dominic Perri	Ensemble Montréal
Saint-Léonard-Est	City Councillor	Arij El Korbi	Ensemble Montréal
Saint-Léonard-Est	Borough Councillor	Linda Paquin	Ensemble Montréal
Saint-Léonard-Ouest	City Councillor	Mauro Barone	Équipe St-Léonard
Saint-Léonard-Ouest	Borough Councillor	Gemma Marchione	Ensemble Montréal

=== Mayors ===
Includes mayors of the former city (1886–2001) and current borough (2001- ) of Saint-Léonard:

- Louis Sicard (1886–1901)
- Gustave Pépin (1901–1903)
- Léon Léonard (1903–1905)
- Jean-Baptiste Jodoin (1905–1906)
- Joseph Léonard (1906–1907)
- Louis D Roy (1907–1910)
- Wilfrid Bastien (1910–1929)
- Pascal Gagnon (1929–1935)
- Philias Gagnon (1935–1939)
- Alphonse D Pesant (1939–1957)
- Antonio Dagenais (1957–1962)
- Paul Émile Petit (1962–1967)
- Leo Ouellet (1967–1974)
- Jean Di Zazzo (1974–1978)
- Michel Bissonnet (1978–1981)
- Antonio di Ciocco (1981–1984)
- Raymond Renaud (1984–1990)
- Frank Zampino (1990–2008)
- Michel Bissonnet (2008-2025)
- Dominic Perri (2025-)

== Notable people and companies ==
Saint-Léonard is the hometown of notable people such as Roberto Luongo, Nadia G and Martin Brodeur. Notable companies from Saint-Léonard include Saputo Inc.

Saint-Léonard is also the place where the Snow blower was invented by one of their citizens, Arthur Sicard.

== See also ==
- Boroughs of Montreal
- Districts of Montreal
- Municipal reorganization in Quebec
- List of former cities in Quebec
- Little Italy, Montreal
- Via Italia
