= Rocco Luccisano =

Montreal city councillor

Member of the Montreal city council for Saint-Michel
- In office 1970–1986

Personal details
- Born: April 30, 1919
- Died: October 11, 2008 (aged 89)
- Party: Civic Party
- Occupation: politician

Rocco Alexander Luccisano (April 30, 1919 – October 11, 2008) was a politician in Montreal, Quebec, Canada. He was a member of the Montreal city council from 1970 to 1986, serving as a member of mayor Jean Drapeau's Civic Party.

== Councillor ==
Luccisano first ran for the Montreal city council in December 1968, in elections held after the municipality of Saint-Michel was annexed to Montreal. He was defeated, but ran again in the 1970 municipal election and won election for Saint-Michel's first ward. The latter election took place against the backdrop of the FLQ crisis.

Luccisano was re-elected in 1974, 1978, and 1982. He sought election for a fifth term in 1986 and lost to Montreal Citizens' Movement candidate Frank Venneri.

== Death ==
Luccisano died of heart failure in October 2008, after a five-month struggle with lung disease.

== Electoral record ==
1982 Montreal municipal election: Councillor, François-Perrault
| Party | Candidate | Votes | % |
|---|---|---|---|
| Civic Party of Montreal | Rocco Luccisano (incumbent) | 3,525 | 54.45 |
| Montreal Citizens' Movement | Rolland Masson | 2,102 | 32.47 |
| Municipal Action Group | William Siemienski | 847 | 13.08 |
| Total valid votes | | 6,474 | 100 |
Source: Election results, 1833-2005 (in French), City of Montreal.

1978 Montreal municipal election: Councillor, François-Perrault
| Party | Candidate | Votes | % |
|---|---|---|---|
| Civic Party of Montreal | Rocco Luccisano (incumbent) | 3,373 | 58.49 |
| Montreal Citizens' Movement | Thérèse Daviau-Bergeron | 1,534 | 26.60 |
| Municipal Action Group | Francine Laurencelle | 860 | 14.91 |
| Total valid votes | | 5,767 | 100 |
Source: Election results, 1833-2005 (in French), City of Montreal. Party identifications are taken from Le Devoir, 11 November 1978.

1974 Montreal municipal election: Councillor, Saint-Michel, Ward One
| Party | Candidate | Votes | % |
|---|---|---|---|
| Civic Party of Montreal | Rocco Luccisano (incumbent) | 6,883 | 51.99 |
| Montreal Citizens' Movement | Diego Bronzati | 6,355 | 48.01 |
| Total valid votes | | 13,238 | 100 |
Source: Election results, 1833-2005 (in French), City of Montreal. Party affiliations are taken from the Montreal Star, 11 November 1974, A11.

1970 Montreal municipal election: Councillor, Saint-Michel, Ward One
| Candidate | Votes | % |
|---|---|---|
| Rocco Luccisano | 9,092 | 57.24 |
| (x)Nicola Ciamarra | 4,445 | 27.99 |
| Raymond Bourget | 2,346 | 14.77 |
| Total valid votes | 15,883 | 100 |
Source: Election results, 1833-2005 (in French), City of Montreal.

December 1, 1968 Montreal municipal election: Councillor, Saint-Michel, Ward Four
| Candidate | Votes | % |
|---|---|---|
| Léopold Lavoie | 1,688 | 34.01 |
| Pierre Begin | 1,586 | 31.96 |
| Rocco Luccisano | 1,052 | 21.20 |
| Rolland Larivière | 637 | 12.83 |
| Total valid votes | 4,963 | 100 |
Source: Election results, 1833-2005 (in French), City of Montreal.
