= Municipal elections in Montreal =

The four-year mandate of Mayor of Montreal coincides with that of the Montreal City Council.

== Montreal municipal elections ==
- 1966 Montreal municipal election
- 1970 Montreal municipal election
- 1974 Montreal municipal election
- 1978 Montreal municipal election
- 1982 Montreal municipal election
- 1986 Montreal municipal election
- 1990 Montreal municipal election
- 1994 Montreal municipal election
- 1998 Montreal municipal election
- 2001 Montreal municipal election
- 2005 Montreal municipal election
- 2009 Montreal municipal election
- 2013 Montreal municipal election
- 2017 Montreal municipal election
- 2021 Montreal municipal election
- 2025 Montreal municipal election

== Montreal City Council ==
The councillors are elected by direct universal suffrage in a majority system and have a mandate of four years.

== Mayor of Montreal ==
The Mayor is elected by direct universal suffrage in a majority system. The Mayor’s four-year mandate coincides with that of the Montreal City Council.

== Borough Councils ==
The city of Montreal is divided into 19 boroughs (in French, arrondissements), each with a mayor and council.

== See also ==
- Municipal elections in Canada
- Montreal City Hall
- Timeline of Montreal history
