= Pierre Lorange =

Pierre Lorange is a former politician in Montreal, Quebec, Canada. He was a member of the Montreal city council from 1966 to 1986 and was a prominent figure in mayor Jean Drapeau's administration.

== Private career ==
Lorange was a jeweller in private life.

== City councillor ==
Lorange first became a member of the Montreal city council in 1966, when he was selected by other councillors to fill a vacant seat. He was re-elected in the 1966, 1970, 1974, 1978, and 1982 municipal elections and served as vice-chair of the Montreal executive committee (i.e., the municipal cabinet) during his later years on council.

In 1985, he helped pass a motion that banned most artists from selling their wares on downtown Montreal streets. The following year, he went on a business trip to China that was paid for by CP Air, a branch of Canadian Pacific, which has large property holdings in Montreal. Lorange broke no rules by taking the trip, but critics nonetheless charged that it highlighted the need for a municipal code of ethics.

Political organizer

Lorange was for many years the chief political organizer of Mayor Drapeau's Civic Party of Montreal and was considered the third most important figure in Drapeau's administration. Lorange was completely loyal to Drapeau, whom he once described as "the father of the party, the enlightened man with great vision and exceptional balance."

During his last years in office, Lorange fought efforts by opposition parties and the provincial government to limit anonymous donations to political parties. Critics often charged that the Civic Party was abusing a loophole in a 1978 provincial law that prohibited anonymous donations of over one hundred dollars, except when the money was collected at "political meetings." The latter term was not clearly defined, and the Civic Party collected almost half of its election budget from anonymous donations in 1978.

Regional councillor

Lorange was a member of the regional Montreal Urban Community and served as head of its planning committee in the 1980s. In 1985, he announced that the city of Montreal would drop its previous objection to "mini-downtowns" being set up in suburban communities. While he acknowledged that the new areas might not benefit Montreal, he added that they did not post a threat to the vitality of the city's downtown.

After Drapeau

Lorange sought the leadership of the Civic Party in July 1986, after Drapeau announced his resignation. He withdrew from the contest before balloting, however, and gave his support to the eventual winner, Claude Dupras. Lorange was not a candidate in the 1986 municipal election, although he campaigned for the Civic Party and attacked Montreal Citizens' Movement (MCM) mayoral candidate Jean Doré by calling him a socialist. The MCM won a landslide victory in this election, and the Civic Party was reduced to only one seat.

== Return to private life ==
In 1988, Lorange called for Dupras to stand down as Civic Party leader. He became involved in a local green space campaign the following year, and some believed he would attempt a political comeback. Ultimately, however, this came to nothing.

In 1994, Lorange announced his subject for Vision Montreal mayoral candidate Pierre Bourque.

== Electoral record ==
1982 Montreal municipal election: Councillor, Hochelaga
Party	Candidate	Votes	%
Civic Party of Montreal	Pierre Lorange (incumbent)	3,669	63.34
Montreal Citizens' Movement	Robert Aubin	1,382	23.86
Municipal Action Group	Jean Guimond	742	12.81
Total valid votes		5,793	100
Source: Election results, 1833-2005 (in French), City of Montreal.

1978 Montreal municipal election: Councillor, Laurier
Party	Candidate	Votes	%
Civic Party of Montreal	Roger Larivée	3,681	58.99
Montreal Citizens' Movement	Louis-André Cadieux	1,483	23.77
Municipal Action Group	François Patenaude	1,076	17.24
Total valid votes		6,240	100
Source: Election results, 1833-2005 (in French), City of Montreal. Party identifications are taken from Le Devoir, 11 November 1978.

1974 Montreal municipal election: Councillor, Maisonneuve, Ward One
Party	Candidate	Votes	%
Civic Party of Montreal	Pierre Lorange (incumbent)	9,067	57.18
Montreal Citizens' Movement	Raymond Faucher	6,789	42.82
Total valid votes		15,856	100
Source: Election results, 1833-2005 (in French), City of Montreal. Party affiliations are taken from the Montreal Star, 11 November 1974, A11.

1970 Montreal municipal election: Councillor, Maisonneuve, Ward One
Candidate	Votes	%
(x)Pierre Lorange	20,430	86.41
Marcel Bureau	3,213	13.59
Total valid votes	23,643	100
Source: Election results, 1833-2005 (in French), City of Montreal.

1966 Montreal municipal election: Councillor, Maisonneuve, Ward One
Candidate	Votes	%
(x)Pierre Lorange	accl.	.
Source: Election results, 1833-2005 (in French), City of Montreal.
