= John Gardiner (Montreal politician) =

John Gardiner is a former politician in Montreal, Quebec, Canada. He was a member of the Montreal city council from 1974 to 1978 and again from 1982 to 1994 as a member of the Montreal Citizens' Movement (MCM) and was a prominent figure in Jean Doré's municipal administration.

== Early life and career ==
An anglophone Montrealer, Gardiner studied history at McGill University. He was a high-school teacher from 1967 to 1973 and a school commissioner from 1973 to 1977. He also co-ordinated Montreal's Milton Park project, in which capacity he organized six hundred units of non-profit housing.

== Opposition councillor ==
Gardiner was a founding member of the Montreal Citizens' Movement and became one of its first elected councillors in the 1974 municipal election, defeating incumbent councillor Hyman Brock in the second Saint-Louis ward. He lost his seat to Civic Party candidate Joffre Laporte in 1978 but was returned over Laporte in a rematch four years later.

Mayor Jean Drapeau's Civic Party dominated municipal politics in this period, and Gardiner served as a member of the opposition. He was considered a radical left-wing activist in the 1970s and took part in several efforts to preserve historic buildings from urban development. By the 1980s, he had moved to the political centre.

Gardiner was the MCM's house leader and housing critic in the mid-1980s. In 1985, he called for the city to hold public consultations before approving any large-scale downtown development projects. The following year, he criticized the Drapeau administration's decision to cancel a housing renovations program.

Shortly before the 1986 municipal election, Gardiner said that francophone Montrealers were becoming increasingly engaged in municipal politics, in light of the growing role of the French language in the city's professional sector. He added that this change benefited the MCM's chances of winning the election.

== Doré administration ==
1986–90

The MCM won a landslide majority in the 1986 municipal election and its mayoral candidate, Jean Doré, was elected to succeed Drapeau. After being sworn in as mayor, Doré appointed Gardiner to the Montreal executive committee (i.e., the municipal cabinet) with responsibility for housing and city planning. Gardiner also served as the leader of the Doré government in council. He supported several development projects while also attempting to promote low-income housing.

Early in the Doré administration, Gardiner offered support to a new low-income housing project in the Rosemont area, pledged that Montreal would cover most costs in renovating dangerous rooming houses, and announced that the city would make rent control a condition of landlords receiving renovation grants. In 1989, he announced that Montreal would introduce a tax incentive to make home ownership easier and prevent a drift to the suburbs.

Gardiner supported several high-rise projects in the Doré administration's first term and was sometimes accused of ignoring tenant rights. One of the most controversial projects he supported was an unsuccessful condominium development on Overdale Avenue that caused the displacement of seventy tenants. Gardiner required the developers to provide alternate housing for all of the affected parties as a condition of the project's approval; this notwithstanding, some MCM councillors opposed the project on the grounds that it was unfair to the tenants and created a bad precedent for future development on the Saint Lawrence River. Despite the internal opposition, the Doré administration approved the project in September 1987. The tenants were ultimately evicted and relocated, although the developers never followed through with building the condominiums. Gardiner later helped approve two 45-storey office buildings in 1988, despite further opposition from within the MCM.

In March 1988, Gardiner announced the first draft of a long-awaited master plan for Montreal's downtown. Its key planks included making Montreal streets friendlier to pedestrians, requiring that no new buildings significantly block the view of Mount Royal, and giving incentives to developers who create "social useful" amenities such as day care centres. Gardiner followed this in January 1990 with a ten-year downtown plan that included the creation of ten thousand new housing units and significant new office space and a restoration of the area's main commercial thoroughfare. Gardiner led council in approving the plan later in the year; critics charged that it favoured developers by permitting the construction of more high-rise offices.

Opponents argued that Gardiner did not sufficiently prioritize low-income housing, while Gardiner responded that Montreal did not receive sufficient funds from the government of Canada. When seeking re-election in 1990, he said that he still regarded himself as a supporter of poor and disenfranchised Montrealers. He argued that Montreal had raised $120 million in new tax revenues from office towers since 1986 and openly described himself as "pro-development."

1990–94

The MCM won second consecutive landslide victory in the 1990 election, and Gardiner was re-elected without difficulty in his new ward of Mile End. He was promoted to vice-chair of the executive committee after the election, with responsibility for economic development, tourism, and housing. Shortly after his appointment, he said that he would consider declaring downtown Montreal a tourist zone to permit Sunday shopping.

Gardiner announced in late 1991 that an ongoing North American recession would delay the city's plans for to construct a municipal court, a computer centre, and two cultural centres. This notwithstanding, he indicated that the city would move forward with a new bicycle path for the St. Jacques cliff, an extension allowing trucks to use the Wellington tunnel, and renovations in the Atwater and Maisonneuve markets. The following year, Gardiner said that the city government would end its ownership of Montreal's four public markets. "We don't think that the city is organized to administer commercial property," he said. "It's not the role of the city and we don't do it well." In October 1992, he announced an $86 million bailout plan for the World Trade Centre Montreal to prevent the Old Montreal facility from going bankrupt.

Gardiner also announced in late 1992 that the city would lift a five-year moratorium on converting apartments into condominiums. Social welfare activists argued that this change would leave tenants vulnerable to harassment by landlords (as had happened before the ban was introduced), but Gardiner said there was no danger of this.

The Doré administration launched a major new housing project in April 1993, budgeted at $350 million and intended to bring five thousand people into the waterfront area east of Old Montreal. Gardiner indicated that twenty per cent of the units would be targeted to low-income families, though he added that he main purpose was to bring people of different income levels into the downtown. In the same month, Doré and Gardiner issued Montreal's first comprehensive economic development plan. Gardiner indicated that his first priority was to introduce a five to ten per cent tax cut for commercial and industrial properties and also said that he would streamline the application process for city building permits.

Gardiner announced significant cuts to Montreal's rental-housing-purchase program in 1993, while arguing that the cuts could have been far worse. Under the program, the city purchased derelict apartments, renovated them, and allowed residents to occupy them again; it was widely regarded as a successful program for renovating neighbourhoods and combating crime. Gardiner noted that the program had been in jeopardy of being eliminated entirely due to the recession and added that the funding cuts could be restored in the future. He protested against the federal government's cuts to public housing in the early 1990s and criticized as discriminatory the provincial government's plan to deny low-income housing access to sponsored immigrants.

In June 1994, Doré and Gardiner announced new reforms to the city's housing code. Gardiner indicated that the changes would increase the rights of tenants and give the city the "power to put (negligent) landlords out of business."

Gardiner was one of the most visible members of the Doré administration and was described by the Montreal Gazette as "extraordinarily hard-working." He announced in August 1994 that he would not seek re-election.

== Since 1994 ==
The MCM was defeated in the 1994 municipal election and later fell victim to internal divisions. Gardiner quit the party in 1997, saying that it was no longer a credible force in municipal politics. In early 1998, he encouraged Conrad Sauve to consider running for mayor of Montreal on a centrist ticket. He also recommended that the Montreal's municipal government be restructured, converting the city into eight to ten municipalities, consolidating the suburbs into eight communities, and giving all municipalities on Montreal Island shared oversight of the city's downtown.

In 2000, Montreal lawyer Jean-Pierre Cantin recorded an affidavit that accused Gardiner of taking bribes for the rezoning of commercial property in Montreal's north end. Gardiner denied the charge, saying, "I haven't a clue what [Cantin] is talking about. I'm not worried because I am not guilty, but I'm concerned because I get phone calls and people are talking. We were an honest government, and we maintained it that way."

== Electoral record ==
1990 Montreal municipal election: Councillor, Mile End
Party	Candidate	Votes	%
Montreal Citizens' Movement	John Gardiner (incumbent)	1,986	48.80
Ecology Montreal	Greg Tutko	657	16.14
Municipal Party	Robert Stec	566	13.91
Civic Party of Montreal	Glenmore T. Browne	476	11.70
Democratic Coalition	Philip Lanthier	385	9.46
Total valid votes		4,070	100
Source: Election results, 1833-2005 (in French), City of Montreal.

1986 Montreal municipal election: Councillor, Ville-Marie
Party	Candidate	Votes	%
Montreal Citizens' Movement	John Gardiner (incumbent)	3,197	66.72
Civic Party of Montreal	René Avon	1,240	25.88
ADMM	Cinthia Cheung	355	7.41
Total valid votes		4,792	100
Source: Election results, 1833-2005 (in French), City of Montreal.

1982 Montreal municipal election: Councillor, Ville-Marie
Party	Candidate	Votes	%
Montreal Citizens' Movement	John Gardiner	2,459	49.49
Civic Party of Montreal	Joffre Laporte (incumbent)	1,689	33.99
Municipal Action Group	Mona Forrest	652	13.12
Independent	Kenneth Cheung	169	3.40
Total valid votes		4,969	100
Source: Election results, 1833-2005 (in French), City of Montreal.

1978 Montreal municipal election: Councillor, Ville-Marie
Party	Candidate	Votes	%
Civic Party of Montreal	Joffre Laporte (incumbent)	1,935	43.91
Montreal Citizens' Movement	John Gardiner (incumbent)	1,463	33.20
Municipal Action Group	Charles Dunbar	916	20.79
Independent	John Goedike	93	2.11
Total valid votes		4,407	100
Source: Election results, 1833-2005 (in French), City of Montreal. Party identifications are taken from Le Devoir, 11 November 1978.

1974 Montreal municipal election: Councillor, Saint-Louis, Ward Two
Party	Candidate	Votes	%
Montreal Citizens' Movement	John Gardiner	6,553	53.54
Civic Party of Montreal	Hyman Brock (incumbent)	4,616	37.71
Democracy Montreal	Gérald Friedlansky	1,071	8.75
Total valid votes		12,240	100
Source: Election results, 1833-2005 (in French), City of Montreal. Party affiliations are taken from the Montreal Star, 11 November 1974, A11.
