= Marc Beaudoin =

Canadian judge and politician

Marc Beaudoin (born 1935 died 2012) was a judge and former politician in the Canadian province of Quebec. He served on the Montreal City Council from 1978 to 1986 as a member of mayor Jean Drapeau's Civic Party and was a member of the Montreal executive committee (i.e., the municipal cabinet). In 1991, he was appointed as a judge on the Quebec Superior Court.

== Private career ==
Beaudoin was a lawyer in private life. A Montreal Gazette report indicated that he was fifty years old in 1986.

== Councillor ==
Beaudoin was first elected to the Montreal city council in the 1978 municipal election and was re-elected in 1982. He served as vice-president of the Montreal executive committee for a time and was chair of council from 1982 to 1986. In May 1986, Beaudoin presided over the first Montreal city council meeting in which journalists were allowed to bring cameras and recording equipment into the chambers.

When Drapeau announced his retirement in 1986, Beaudoin supported Claude Dupras's successful bid to become the Civic Party's new leader and mayoral candidate. Dupras was defeated by Montreal Citizens' Movement candidate Jean Doré in the general election, while Beaudoin was defeated in Gabriel-Sagard by MCM candidate Vittorio Capparelli.

Beaudoin became the Civic Party's vice-president after the election. He resigned from the party executive in February 1989, saying that the party's attempts at democratization "[had] not achieved the desired results."

== Federal politics ==
Beaudoin was a supporter of the Progressive Conservative Party of Canada at the federal level. He was chosen as president of the party's Rosemont association in August 1988, with support from the party establishment. Rosemont's Member of Parliament (MP) at the time was Suzanne Blais-Grenier, who questioned the legitimacy of Beaudoin's election and suggested that it was part of an effort to pressure her into resigning. Her supporters set up a rival association with a different president, and a quarrel ensued as to which group controlled the local party finances.

Blais-Grenier was ultimately kicked out of the Progressive Conservative party, and Beaudoin's association was recognized as official. Shortly thereafter, Beaudoin resigned as president to become the Progressive Conservative candidate for Saint-Léonard in the 1988 federal election. This contest was expected to be close, but it was not; Beaudoin finished a fairly distant second against Liberal incumbent Alfonso Gagliano.

== Judge ==
In December 1991, Canadian federal Jjustice Minister Kim Campbell appointed Beaudoin as a judge on the Quebec Superior Court.

Notable rulings

Beaudoin ruled in July 1993 that the last remaining English-language school overseen by the Montreal Catholic School Commission in Côte-des-Neiges could be redesignated as a French-language school. Several parents of anglophone children argued that the commission made its decision without proper consultation; Beaudoin concluded that the parents did not prove their case.

In 1997, Beaudoin dismissed a lawsuit from a Quebec resident who had sued McDonald's for $33,864 after suffering second-degree burns from spilled coffee. The litigant was seated in a car that was not moving at the time of the incident, and Beaudoin ruled that only the Quebec automobile-insurance board (rather than the company) could be held liable for "damage caused by an automobile." The Quebec Court of Appeal later overturned Beaudoin's decision, concluding that there was no link between the litigant's injuries and the use or ownership of a car.

Beaudoin reviewed a class-action lawsuit by former Jonquière Wal-Mart employees in 2005, following the company's decision to close their Jonquière branch after a successful unionization drive by the employees. Wal-Mart claimed that the store was not sufficiently profitable, while opponents argued the company's decision was intended to intimidate workers in other branches. Beaudoin ultimately ruled that the lawsuit could not proceed, on the grounds that the dispute with Wal-Mart was the exclusive jurisdiction of the Quebec labour board. The former employees announced they would appeal the decision.

== Electoral record ==
1988 Canadian federal election: Saint-Léonard—Saint-Michel
Party	Candidate	Votes	%	±%	Expenditures
Liberal	Alfonso Gagliano	23,014	50.25	–	$44,847
Progressive Conservative	Marc Beaudoin	17,055	37.24		$43,281
New Democratic	Michel Roche	4,663	10.18		$742
Green	Rolf Bramann	833	1.82		$140
Independent	Bernard Papillon	231	0.50		$130
Total valid votes		45,796	100.00		
Total rejected ballots		1,018			
Turnout		46,814	74.49		
Electors on the lists		62,845			
Source: Report of the Chief Electoral Officer, Thirty-fourth General Election, 1988.

1986 Montreal municipal election: Councillor, Gabriel-Sagard
Party	Candidate	Votes	%
Montreal Citizens' Movement	Vittorio Capparelli	3,139	49.05
Civic Party of Montreal	Marc Beaudoin (incumbent)	1,874	29.28
Independent	Marcel Paquet	1,387	21.67
Total valid votes		6,400	100
Source: Election results, 1833-2005 (in French), City of Montreal.

1982 Montreal municipal election: Councillor, Gabriel-Sagard
Party	Candidate	Votes	%
Civic Party of Montreal	Marc Beaudoin (incumbent)	3,448	50.26
Montreal Citizens' Movement	Consolato Gattuso	1,900	27.69
Municipal Action Group	Pierre Harel	1,124	16.38
Independent	Marcel Paquet	389	5.67
Total valid votes		6,861	100
Source: Election results, 1833-2005 (in French), City of Montreal.

1978 Montreal municipal election: Councillor, Gabriel-Sagard
Party	Candidate	Votes	%
Civic Party of Montreal	Marc Beaudoin	4,287	60.80
Municipal Action Group	Yvon Marcotte	1,961	27.81
Montreal Citizens' Movement	Daniel Lauzon	803	11.39
Total valid votes		7,051	100
Source: Election results, 1833-2005 (in French), City of Montreal. Party identifications are taken from Le Devoir, 11 November 1978.
