= Serge Bélanger =

Serge Bélanger is a former politician in Montreal, Quebec, Canada. He was a member of the Montreal city council from 1975 to 1986 and served on the Montreal executive committee in the 1980s. Bélanger was a member of mayor Jean Drapeau's Civic Party of Montreal.

Bélanger was a building contractor in private life. He was first elected to city council in the 1974 municipal election for the Sainte-Marie division and was re-elected in 1978 and 1982. He served on the executive committee during the final years of Drapeau's administration.

Drapeau retired with the 1986 municipal election, in which the opposition Montreal Citizens' Movement (MCM) won a landslide majority on city council under Jean Doré's leadership. Bélanger was defeated by MCM candidate Serge Lajeunesse in Sainte-Marie. During this campaign, Lajeunesse accused Bélanger of attempting to scare voters in low-income neighbourhoods and retirement homes by claiming that municipal subsidies would be cut off in the event of a MCM victory. Bélanger denied the charge.

Bélanger was elected to the Civic Party executive in May 1989 as a supporter of the party's Drapeau-era establishment against internal reformers. He tried to return to council in the 1990 municipal election and finished third in the François-Perrault division against MCM candidate Vittorio Capparelli.

Bélanger was an ally of Liberal Member of Parliament (MP) Jean-Claude Malepart, who helped canvass for his municipal campaigns.

== Electoral record ==
1990 Montreal municipal election: Councillor, François-Perrault
Party	Candidate	Votes	%
Montreal Citizens' Movement	Vittorio Capparelli (incumbent)	1,757	43.66
Municipal Party	Frank Venneri (incumbent)	1,142	28.38
Civic Party of Montreal	Serge Bélanger	1,125	27.96
Total valid votes		4,024	100
Source: Election results, 1833-2005 (in French), City of Montreal.

1986 Montreal municipal election: Councillor, Sainte-Marie
Party	Candidate	Votes	%
Montreal Citizens' Movement	Serge Lajeunesse	3,420	60.45
Civic Party of Montreal	Serge Bélanger (incumbent)	2,152	38.03
ADMM	Yvon Roy	86	1.52
Total valid votes		5,658	100
Source: Election results, 1833-2005 (in French), City of Montreal.

1982 Montreal municipal election: Councillor, Sainte-Marie
Party	Candidate	Votes	%
Civic Party of Montreal	Serge Bélanger (incumbent)	3,342	52.23
Montreal Citizens' Movement	Roger Marchand	2,751	42.99
Municipal Action Group	Gaétan Toussaint	306	4.78
Total valid votes		6,399	100
Source: Election results, 1833-2005 (in French), City of Montreal.

1978 Montreal municipal election: Councillor, Sainte-Marie
Party	Candidate	Votes	%
Civic Party of Montreal	Serge Bélanger (incumbent)	3,752	67.10
Municipal Action Group	Georges Massicotte	1,107	19.80
Montreal Citizens' Movement	Pauline Laflamme	733	13.11
Total valid votes		5,592	100
Source: Election results, 1833-2005 (in French), City of Montreal. Party identifications are taken from Le Devoir, 11 November 1978.

1974 Montreal municipal election: Councillor, Papineau, Ward Two
Party	Candidate	Votes	%
Civic Party of Montreal	Serge Bélanger	6,056	51.53
Montreal Citizens' Movement	Michel Boisvert	5,697	48.47
Total valid votes		11,753	100
Source: Election results, 1833-2005 (in French), City of Montreal. Party affiliations are taken from the Montreal Star, 11 November 1974, A11.
