= George Savoidakis =

Canadian politician

George Savoidakis (1938 – October 6, 1995) was a politician in Montreal, Quebec, Canada. He served on the Montreal city council from 1978 to 1986, representing the Parc-Extension ward as a member of mayor Jean Drapeau's Civic Party of Montreal.

== Early life and career ==
Savoidakis was born on the Greek island of Crete and spent his formative years in the community of Agioi Deka. He moved to Canada in 1955, studied business at Concordia University, and later became a broker with Whalen Beliveau and Associates. He also served as vice-president of the Caisse Populaire de St. Roch and the Hellenic Community of the Island of Montreal.

Savoidakis ran as a Union Nationale candidate in the 1976 provincial election.

== Councillor ==
Savoidakis was elected to the Montreal city council in the 1978 municipal election, as the Civic Party won almost all seats on council. He was re-elected in 1982. Throughout his time on council, he was a backbench supporter of Drapeau's administration. He also served on the Montreal Urban Community and was a member of its committee on minorities.

The Civic Party in this period was strongly centered around Drapeau's personality, and Savoidakis was known as one of the few party mavericks on council. In October 1985, he was quoted as saying, "Being a councillor in the Civic Party is a lonely place to be. Decisions are reached beyond our power. There are some of us, like myself, who feel we should have more input." Savoidakis tried, without success, to convince Drapeau's administration to hold night court sessions for the convenience of working Montrealers.

Savoidakis also sought to increase representation from Montreal's cultural communities on the city's police force, despite reluctance from within his own party. In 1985, he proposed that a local complaints committee be established at every police station in the Montreal Urban Community to ensure a more transparent complaints review process.

He welcomed a Quebec Superior Court ruling in 1985 that determined the province's Charter of the French Language could not prevent businesses from using English on signs and advertisements.

Rumours circulated in the mid-1980s that the Civic Party could drop Savoidakis as a candidate. Savoidakis said that he was not concerned with this threat; describing himself as a "small-c conservative," he also said that he would not defect to the progressive Montreal Citizens' Movement (MCM), which was then in opposition.

When Jean Drapeau announced that he would seek not re-election in 1986, Savoidakis supported Yvon Lamarre's unsuccessful bid to become the party's new mayoral candidate.

The Gazette supported Savoidakis's bid for re-election in 1986, even though it gave a general endorsement to the MCM. He was defeated by MCM candidate Pierre Goyer amid a landslide MCM victory across the city.

On one occasion, the Montreal Gazette described Savoidakis as "one of the few high-profile politicians in the city who is respected by almost everyone, no matter what their political orientation."

== Later political career ==
Savoidakis was chosen as one of the Civic Party's vice-presidents in August 1988. He resigned from the party executive in March 1989, however, saying that, he was "tired of the perpetual infighting" that was affecting the party. He later joined the Montreal Municipal Party and ran for council under its banner in the 1990 election. In the 1994 election, he ran for the Montrealers Party. He was defeated both times.

He died of prostate cancer in 1995.

== Electoral record ==
1994 Montreal municipal election: Councillor, Parc-Extension division
Party	Candidate	Votes	%
Montreal Citizens' Movement	(x)Konstantinos Georgoulis	2,419	33.64
Vision Montreal	Angelos Diacoumacos	1,968	27.37
Independent	Sofoklis Rasoulis	959	13.34
Independent	Christos Karidogiannis	828	11.51
Montrealers' Party	George Savoidakis	804	11.18
Democratic Coalition–Ecology Montreal	Peter Stamadianos	213	2.96
Total valid votes		7,191	100
Source: Official Results, City of Montreal

1990 Montreal municipal election: Councillor, Loyola
Party	Candidate	Votes	%
Montreal Citizens' Movement	Sharon Leslie (incumbent)	1,360	31.45
Municipal Party	George Savoidakis	1,290	29.83
Democratic Coalition	Jeremy Searle	1,094	25.30
Civic Party of Montreal	Andrew Barbacki	580	13.41
Total valid votes		4,324	100
Source: Election results, 1833-2005 (in French), City of Montreal.

1986 Montreal municipal election: Councillor, Jean-Talon
Party	Candidate	Votes	%
Montreal Citizens' Movement	Pierre Goyer	2,870	59.33
Civic Party of Montreal	George Savoidakis (incumbent)	1,547	31.98
ADMM	Demetre Costopoulos	420	8.68
Total valid votes		4,837	100
Source: Election results, 1833-2005 (in French), City of Montreal.

1982 Montreal municipal election: Councillor, Jean-Talon
Party	Candidate	Votes	%
Civic Party of Montreal	George Savoidakis (incumbent)	3,118	52.55
Montreal Citizens' Movement	Vittorio Capparelli	1,481	24.96
Municipal Action Group	Gino Gentile	1,113	18.76
Independent	Nicola L. Corbo	221	3.72
Total valid votes		5,933	100
Source: Election results, 1833-2005 (in French), City of Montreal.

1978 Montreal municipal election: Councillor, Jean-Talon
Party	Candidate	Votes	%
Civic Party of Montreal	George Savoidakis	2,031	50.95
Montreal Citizens' Movement	Leah Markopoulos	1,133	28.42
Municipal Action Group	John Brazil	822	20.62
Total valid votes		3,986	100
Source: Election results, 1833-2005 (in French), City of Montreal. Party identifications are taken from Le Devoir, 11 November 1978.

1976 Quebec general election: Laurier
Party	Candidate	Votes	%
Liberal	André Marchand	11,858	41.68
Parti Québécois	John Kambites	9,583	33.69
Union Nationale	Georges Savoidakis	4,962	17.44
Democratic Alliance	Christos Syros	921	3.24
Ralliement créditiste	Denise Chartrand Marion	678	2.38
Communist	Madame Joseph Mallaroni	240	0.84
coalition: NPDQ - RMS	Pierre Bastien	206	0.72
Total valid votes		28,448	100.00
Rejected and declined votes		840	
Turnout		29,288	82.79
Electors on the lists		35,377	
Source: Official Results, Le Directeur général des élections du Québec.
