= Roger Larivée =

Roger Larivée is a former politician in Montreal, Quebec, Canada. He served on the Montreal city council from 1978 to 1982 as a member of the Civic Party of Montreal.

Larivée worked at his family's roofing firm in private life. He first ran for a seat on city council in the 1974 municipal election and was defeated in the second Saint-Jacques ward. He was elected in the 1978 municipal election, in which the Civic Party won a landslide majority, and served for the next four years as a backbench supporter of mayor Jean Drapeau's administration. He was defeated by Robert Perreault of the Montreal Citizens' Movement in the 1982 election.

Larivée intended to run as a Civic Party candidate again in the 1986 municipal election but was denied the nomination. He later briefly affiliated with the Montreal Municipal Democratic Alliance party, but ultimately chose to run as an independent. He finished a distant third.

== Electoral record ==
1986 Montreal municipal election: Councillor, Laurier
Party	Candidate	Votes	%
Montreal Citizens' Movement	Robert Perreault (incumbent)	3,701	70.67
Civic Party of Montreal	Gilles Lupien	1,137	21.71
Independent	Roger Larivée	399	7.62
Total valid votes		5,237	100
Source: Election results, 1833-2005 (in French), City of Montreal.

1982 Montreal municipal election: Councillor, Laurier
Party	Candidate	Votes	%
Montreal Citizens' Movement	Robert Perreault	2,635	49.73
Civic Party of Montreal	Roger Larivée (incumbent)	2,137	40.33
Municipal Action Group	Gilles Côté	527	9.95
Total valid votes		5,299	100
Source: Election results, 1833-2005 (in French), City of Montreal.

1978 Montreal municipal election: Councillor, Laurier
Party	Candidate	Votes	%
Civic Party of Montreal	Roger Larivée	3,681	58.99
Montreal Citizens' Movement	Louis-André Cadieux	1,483	23.77
Municipal Action Group	François Patenaude	1,076	17.24
Total valid votes		6,240	100
Source: Election results, 1833-2005 (in French), City of Montreal. Party identifications are taken from Le Devoir, 11 November 1978.

1974 Montreal municipal election: Councillor, Saint-Jacques, Ward Two
Party	Candidate	Votes	%
Montreal Citizens' Movement	Raymond Poulin	6,025	47.19
Civic Party of Montreal	Aimé Y. Charron	4,880	38.22
Independent	Roger Larivée	1,175	9.20
Democracy Montreal	Léo Manseau	688	5.39
Total valid votes		12,768	100
Source: Election results, 1833-2005 (in French), City of Montreal. Party affiliations are taken from the Montreal Star, 11 November 1974, A11.
