= Vittorio Capparelli =

Member of the Montreal Executive Committee with responsibility for income security and social issues
- In office 1994–1996

Montreal City Councillor for the François-Perrault ward
- In office 1990–1998
- Preceded by: Frank Venneri
- Succeeded by: Frank Venneri

Montreal City Councillor for the Gabriel-Sagard ward
- In office 1986–1990
- Preceded by: Marc Beaudoin
- Succeeded by: ward eliminated

Personal details
- Born: Italy

Vittorio Capparelli is a politician in Montreal, Quebec, Canada. He served on the Montreal city council from 1986 to 1998 and was a member of the Montreal executive committee (i.e., the municipal cabinet) from 1994 to 1996.

== Early life and career ==
Capparelli was born in Italy and moved to Canada in 1967. He was initially a lathe operator and later became the administrator of Patronat INCA, a group providing services for Quebec workers of Italian origin.

== City councillor ==
Montreal Citizens' Movement

Capparelli first ran for city council in 1982 municipal election as a candidate of the progressive Montreal Citizens' Movement (MCM) and finished second to Civic Party incumbent George Savoidakis in the Jean-Talon ward. He ran a second time in 1986 and defeated Civic Party incumbent Marc Beaudoin in the Gabriel-Sagard ward. The MCM won a landslide victory in this election under mayoral candidate Jean Doré, and Capparelli served as a backbench supporter of Doré's administration for the next four years. He was re-elected in the 1990 election in the redistributed ward of François-Perrault over fellow incumbent Frank Venneri, a former MCM member who had joined the opposition Municipal Party.

Capparelli became increasingly critical of Doré's administration in the early 1990s. In November 1991, he was the only MCM councillor to support an opposition initiative that would have diverted money from paving de la Commune Street in Old Montreal to improving the state of the city's playgrounds. He also voiced objections about the MCM's 1991 budget, and he openly criticized his party in the media several times in early 1992. Other MCM councillors were also critical of the party's direction in the same period.

Capparelli re-confirmed his support for the MCM in September 1992 after Doré promised to address the concerns of party dissidents. The internal divisions continued, however, and in 1993 Capparelli voted against an MCM initiative for Montreal to lease space in the World Trade Center, charging that the decision was made in an undemocratic fashion. He ultimately resigned from the MCM on December 20, 1993, describing the Doré administration as "incompetent" and dominated by an "omnipresent" executive committee. He also complained that party discipline rules prevented councillors from voting their conscience.

Vision Montreal

Capparelli was briefly a member of Claude Beauchamp's Action Montreal party from March to April 1994. This party was not formally recognized, and Capparelli technically remained an independent councillor.

Beauchamp dissolved Action Montreal in April 1994 to support the Vision Montreal group that was then coalescing under Pierre Bourque's leadership. Capparelli joined Vision Montreal in September 1994 and was re-elected under its banner in the 1994 municipal election. Bourque defeated Doré in this election to become Montreal's mayor, and Vision Montreal won a significant majority on council; in November 1994, Bourque appointed Capparelli to the executive committee with responsibility for income security and social issues.

Capparelli indicated his opposition to affirmative action programs in a media interview in February 1995. He clarified that he was not speaking on behalf of Bourque's administration.

Bourque removed Capparelli from the executive committee on October 4, 1996, and reassigned him as assistant to committee chair Noushig Eloyan. Capparelli sought a court injunction to reverse his demotion, arguing that the mayor did not have the legal right to remove him from the executive. Nothing appears to have come from this. Capparelli ultimately broke with Bourque in January 1997, saying, "I no longer have confidence in the mayor. The problem is that Mr. Bourque wants to concentrate all the power at city hall in his own hand."

Capparelli was expelled from the Vision Montreal caucus on February 11, 1997, and served for a time as an independent councillor. In early 1998, he joined an informal group of opposition councillors led by Sammy Forcillo. He later rejoined the Montreal Citizens' Movement and ran for the party in the 1998 election; he lost to Frank Venneri, who by this time had joined Vision Montreal.

== Subsequent elections ==
Capparelli later rejoined Vision Montreal and ran for city council under its banner in the 2005 municipal election. He again lost to Venneri, who by this time had joined Gérald Tremblay's Montreal Island Citizens Union.

Capparelli ran for borough mayor of Saint-Leonard in 2009 and finished a distant second against Union Montreal incumbent Michel Bissonnet.

== Electoral record ==
2009 Montreal municipal election: Borough mayor of Saint-Leonard
Party	Candidate	Votes	%
Union Montreal	(x)Michel Bissonnet	12,449	69.72
Vision Montreal	Vittorio Capparelli	2,035	11.40
Action civique Montréal	Italo Barone	1,868	10.46
Projet Montréal	Nicolas Marchildon	1,325	7.42
Independent	David Mallozzi	179	1.00
Total valid votes		17,856	100
Source: Election results, 2009, City of Montreal.

2005 Montreal municipal election: Councillor, François-Perrault
Party	Candidate	Votes	%
Montreal Island Citizens Union	Frank Venneri (incumbent)	3,206	42.63
Vision Montreal	Vittorio Capparelli	2,966	39.44
Projet Montréal	Maria Marra	1,348	17.93
Total valid votes		7,520	100
Source: City of Montreal official results (in French), City of Montreal.

1998 Montreal municipal election: Councillor, François-Perrault
Party	Candidate	Votes	%
Vision Montreal	Frank Venneri	2,622	49.05
Montreal Citizens' Movement	(x)Vittorio Capparelli	1,277	23.89
New Montreal	Lanise Hayes	780	14.59
Team Montreal	Yasmin Bautista	420	7.86
Independent	Michel Handfield	247	4.62
Total valid votes		5,346	100
Source: Official Results, City of Montreal

1994 Montreal municipal election: Councillor, François-Perrault
Party	Candidate	Votes	%
Vision Montreal	Vittorio Capparelli	2,277	48.16
Montreal Citizens' Movement	Lyse Brunet	1,303	27.56
Montrealers' Party	Frank Venneri	1,000	21.15
Democratic Coalition–Ecology Montreal	Mario Laquerre	148	3.13
Total valid votes		4,728	100
Source: Official Results, City of Montreal

1990 Montreal municipal election: Councillor, François-Perrault
Party	Candidate	Votes	%
Montreal Citizens' Movement	Vittorio Capparelli (incumbent)	1,757	43.66
Municipal Party	Frank Venneri (incumbent)	1,142	28.38
Civic Party of Montreal	Serge Bélanger	1,125	27.96
Total valid votes		4,024	100
Source: Election results, 1833-2005 (in French), City of Montreal.

1986 Montreal municipal election: Councillor, Gabriel-Sagard
Party	Candidate	Votes	%
Montreal Citizens' Movement	Vittorio Capparelli	3,139	49.05
Civic Party of Montreal	Marc Beaudoin (incumbent)	1,874	29.28
Independent	Marcel Paquet	1,387	21.67
Total valid votes		6,400	100
Source: Election results, 1833-2005 (in French), City of Montreal.

1982 Montreal municipal election: Councillor, Jean-Talon
Party	Candidate	Votes	%
Civic Party of Montreal	George Savoidakis (incumbent)	3,118	52.55
Montreal Citizens' Movement	Vittorio Capparelli	1,481	24.96
Municipal Action Group	Gino Gentile	1,113	18.76
Independent	Nicola L. Corbo	221	3.72
Total valid votes		5,933	100
Source: Election results, 1833-2005 (in French), City of Montreal.
