= 1978 Montreal municipal election =

Election in Quebec, Canada

The 1978 Montreal municipal election took place on November 12, 1978, to elect a mayor and city councillors in Montreal, Quebec, Canada. Longtime mayor Jean Drapeau was re-elected to another four-year term in office, defeating Canadian federal parliamentarian Serge Joyal.

Elections were also held in Montreal's suburban communities in November 1978. Most suburban elections took place on November 5; the election in Saint-Léonard was held on November 12.

== Results ==
Mayor

1978 Montreal municipal election: Mayor of Montreal
Party	Candidate	Votes	%
Civic Party of Montreal	Jean Drapeau (incumbent)	212,345	60.89
Municipal Action Group	Serge Joyal	89,173	25.57
Montreal Citizens' Movement	Guy Duquette	43,522	12.48
Independent	Louis Gervais	1,963	0.56
Independent	Mariette Lapierre	1,755	0.50
Total valid votes		348,758	100
Source: Election results, 1833-2005 (in French), City of Montreal. Party identifications are taken from Le Devoir, 11 November 1978.

Council

Party colours do not indicate affiliation or resemblance to a provincial or a federal party.

1978 Montreal municipal election: Councillor, Longue-Pointe
Party	Candidate	Votes	%
Civic Party of Montreal	Luc Larivée	4,100	57.80
Municipal Action Group	Gérard Nadeau	1,565	22.06
Montreal Citizens' Movement	Marius Minier	1,429	20.14
Total valid votes		7,094	100
Source: Election results, 1833-2005 (in French), City of Montreal. Party identifications are taken from Le Devoir, 11 November 1978.

1978 Montreal municipal election: Councillor, Hochelaga
Party	Candidate	Votes	%
Civic Party of Montreal	Pierre Lorange (incumbent)	4,505	62.15
Municipal Action Group	Louis-Pierre Lapointe	1,991	27.47
Montreal Citizens' Movement	Claude Roy	753	10.39
Total valid votes		7,249	100
Source: Election results, 1833-2005 (in French), City of Montreal. Party identifications are taken from Le Devoir, 11 November 1978.

1978 Montreal municipal election: Councillor, François-Perrault
Party	Candidate	Votes	%
Civic Party of Montreal	Rocco Luccisano (incumbent)	3,373	58.49
Montreal Citizens' Movement	Thérèse Daviau-Bergeron	1,534	26.60
Municipal Action Group	Francine Laurencelle	860	14.91
Total valid votes		5,767	100
Source: Election results, 1833-2005 (in French), City of Montreal. Party identifications are taken from Le Devoir, 11 November 1978.

1978 Montreal municipal election: Councillor, Gabriel-Sagard
Party	Candidate	Votes	%
Civic Party of Montreal	Marc Beaudoin	4,287	60.80
Municipal Action Group	Yvon Marcotte	1,961	27.81
Montreal Citizens' Movement	Daniel Lauzon	803	11.39
Total valid votes		7,051	100
Source: Election results, 1833-2005 (in French), City of Montreal. Party identifications are taken from Le Devoir, 11 November 1978.

1978 Montreal municipal election: Councillor, Jean-Talon
Party	Candidate	Votes	%
Civic Party of Montreal	George Savoidakis	2,031	50.95
Montreal Citizens' Movement	Leah Markopoulos	1,133	28.42
Municipal Action Group	John Brazil	822	20.62
Total valid votes		3,986	100
Source: Election results, 1833-2005 (in French), City of Montreal. Party identifications are taken from Le Devoir, 11 November 1978.

1978 Montreal municipal election: Councillor, Laurier
Party	Candidate	Votes	%
Civic Party of Montreal	Roger Larivée	3,681	58.99
Montreal Citizens' Movement	Louis-André Cadieux	1,483	23.77
Municipal Action Group	François Patenaude	1,076	17.24
Total valid votes		6,240	100
Source: Election results, 1833-2005 (in French), City of Montreal. Party identifications are taken from Le Devoir, 11 November 1978.

1978 Montreal municipal election: Councillor, Sainte-Marie
Party	Candidate	Votes	%
Civic Party of Montreal	Serge Bélanger (incumbent)	3,752	67.10
Municipal Action Group	Georges Massicotte	1,107	19.80
Montreal Citizens' Movement	Pauline Laflamme	733	13.11
Total valid votes		5,592	100
Source: Election results, 1833-2005 (in French), City of Montreal. Party identifications are taken from Le Devoir, 11 November 1978.

1978 Montreal municipal election: Councillor, Ville-Marie
Party	Candidate	Votes	%
Civic Party of Montreal	Joffre Laporte (incumbent)	1,935	43.91
Montreal Citizens' Movement	John Gardiner (incumbent)	1,463	33.20
Municipal Action Group	Charles Dunbar	916	20.79
Independent	John Goedike	93	2.11
Total valid votes		4,407	100
Source: Election results, 1833-2005 (in French), City of Montreal. Party identifications are taken from Le Devoir, 11 November 1978.

1978 Montreal municipal election: Councillor, Saint-Henri
Party	Candidate	Votes	%
Civic Party of Montreal	Germain Prégent	4,177	69.02
Municipal Action Group	Huguette Langevin	1,263	20.87
Montreal Citizens' Movement	Pierre Roberge	612	10.11
Total valid votes		6,052	100
Source: Election results, 1833-2005 (in French), City of Montreal. Party identifications are taken from Le Devoir, 11 November 1978.

== Results in suburban communities ==
=== Dorval ===
Electoral District	Position	Total valid votes	Candidates		Incumbent
Electoral District	Position	Total valid votes	Winner	Defeated candidate	Incumbent
	Mayor		Sarto Desnoyers (acclaimed)		Sarto Desnoyers
East Ward	Councillor		Jean-Paul Bernier (acclaimed)		Jean-Paul Bernier
East Ward	Councillor		Peter Yeomans	Michel Rioux	Michel Rioux
East Ward	Councillor		Jean J. Cardinal (acclaimed)		
West Ward	Councillor		Roy Amaron (acclaimed)		Roy Amaron
West Ward	Councillor		Geoffrey Ballance (acclaimed)		Geoffrey Ballance
West Ward 3	Councillor		Frank Richmond; 1,756 (85.62%)	Douglas Worsley; 295 (14.38%)	Frank Richmond

Source: Rodolphe Morissette, "Quatre nouveaux maires sur l'île de Montréal," Le Devoir, November 6, 1978, pp. 1-3.

=== Montréal-Nord ===
Electoral District	Position	Total valid votes	Candidates		Incumbent
Electoral District	Position	Total valid votes	Renouveau municipal	Others	Incumbent
	Mayor	-	Yves Ryan (acclaimed)		Yves Ryan
East Quarter, Seat One	Councillor	-	Jean-Paul Lessard (acclaimed)		Jean-Paul Lessard
East Quarter, Seat Two	Councillor	-	Normand Fortin (acclaimed)		
West Quarter, Seat One	Councillor	-	Pierre Blain (acclaimed)		Pierre Blain
West Quarter, Seat Two	Councillor	-	Ernest Chartrand (acclaimed)		Ernest Chartrand
Center Quarter, Seat One	Councillor	-	Réal Gibeau; 1,987 (65.00%)	André Elliott; 1,070 (35.00%)	
Center Quarter, Seat Two	Councillor	-	Maurice Bélanger (acclaimed)		Maurice Bélanger

Source: "Les élections municipales," Le Devoir, 6 November 1978, A3.

=== Saint-Léonard ===
1978 Saint-Leonard municipal election: Councillor, Ward Three
Party	Candidate	Votes	%
Parti de l'alliance municipale	Robert Benoît	524	26.68
Équipe du renouveau de la cité de Saint-Léonard	Giuseppe Silvestri	427	21.74
Parti civique	Vittorio Bonaduce	388	19.76
Independent	Claudette Pregent	289	14.71
Independent	Donaldo Gianperso	254	12.93
Citoyen et progress	Gerald Lalonde	82	4.18
Total valid votes		1,964	100
Source: Election results, 1833-2005 (in French), City of Montreal. Party identifications are taken from Le Devoir, 11 November 1978.

1978 Saint-Leonard municipal election: Councillor, Ward Four
Party	Candidate	Votes	%
Parti civique	Joseph Andreoni co-listed with Don Carducci	765	32.06
Équipe du renouveau de la cité de Saint-Léonard	Giuseppe Mormina	668	28.00
Parti de l'alliance municipale	Franco Tutino	483	20.24
Independent	Herminio Iadeluca (incumbent)	387	16.22
Citoyen et progress	Linda Nardi	83	3.48
Total valid votes		2,386	100
Source: Election results, 1833-2005 (in French), City of Montreal. Party identifications are taken from Le Devoir, 11 November 1978.

1978 Saint-Leonard municipal election: Councillor, Ward Six
Party	Candidate	Votes	%
Parti de l'alliance municipale	Eduardo di Bennardo	596	35.69
Parti civique	Francesco Orlando	504	30.18
Équipe du renouveau de la cité de Saint-Léonard	Marcel Dubois	461	27.60
Citoyen et progress	Gerard Thibault	109	6.53
Total valid votes		1,670	100
Source: Election results, 1833-2005 (in French), City of Montreal. Party identifications are taken from Le Devoir, 11 November 1978.

1978 Saint-Leonard municipal election: Councillor, Ward Eight
Party	Candidate	Votes	%
Équipe du renouveau de la cité de Saint-Léonard	Rosario Ortona	588	39.28
Parti de l'alliance municipale	Louis Tanguay	459	30.66
Parti civique	Giovanni Sardo	393	26.25
Citoyen et progress	Pierre Bally	57	3.81
Total valid votes		1,497	100
Source: Election results, 1833-2005 (in French), City of Montreal. Party identifications are taken from Le Devoir, 11 November 1978.

1978 Saint-Leonard municipal election: Councillor, Ward Ten
Party	Candidate	Votes	%
Parti de l'alliance municipale	Jules Lauzon	965	49.74
Équipe du renouveau de la cité de Saint-Léonard	Filomena Sclapari	594	30.62
Parti civique	Benny Morella	325	16.75
Citoyen et progress	Marcel Boivin	56	2.89
Total valid votes		1,940	100
Source: Election results, 1833-2005 (in French), City of Montreal. Party identifications are taken from Le Devoir, 11 November 1978.

1978 Saint-Leonard municipal election: Councillor, Ward Eleven
Party	Candidate	Votes	%
Parti de l'alliance municipale	Jacques Proulx	822	39.54
Parti civique	Vittorio Galerio	579	27.85
Équipe du renouveau de la cité de Saint-Léonard	Jean-Guy Gravel	484	23.28
Citoyen et progress	François de Marco co-listed with Sylvie Dulac	194	9.33
Total valid votes		2,079	100
Source: Election results, 1833-2005 (in French), City of Montreal. Party identifications are taken from Le Devoir, 11 November 1978.

== Information on elected candidates in suburban communities ==
Parti de l'alliance municipale

- Robert Benoît (Ward Three) was elected in a close contest over five opponents. He did not seek re-election in 1982.

== Elections in other Montreal-area communities ==
=== Longueuil ===
The 1978 municipal election in Longueuil did not produce a clear winner. Marcel Robidas of the Parti civique de Longueuil was re-elected as mayor, but nine of the seventeen council seats were won by the opposition Parti municipal de Longueuil.

Winning candidates appear in boldface.

Electoral District	Position	Total valid votes	Candidates				Incumbent
Electoral District	Position	Total valid votes	Parti municipal	Parti civique	Parti de la réforme municipale	Independent	Incumbent
	Mayor	33,219	Paul Viau; 13,445 (40.47%)	**Marcel Robidas**; 15,828 (47.65%)	Jean Huot; 3,946 (11.88%)		
District 1	Councillor	2,117	Réal Gendron; 396 (18.71%)	Roger Ferguson; 619 (29.24%)	Yvon Bourcier; 264 (12.47%)	**Jacques Bouchard**; 742 (35.05%) Roger Courchesne; 96 (4.53%)	
District 2	Councillor	3,156	**Georges Touten**; 1,204 (38.15%)	Lucile Roy; 1,128 (35.74%)		Marc Decelles; 824 (26.11%)	
District 3	Councillor	1,732	Henri Bouclin; 539 (31.12%)	**Léonard Boulet**; 728 (42.03%)		Gilles Bouffard; 465 (26.85%)	
District 4	Councillor	2,621	**Roger Ferland**; 1,093 (41.70%)	Bernard Brisson; 879 (33.54%)	Henri D'Amour; 288 (10.99%)	Gilles Leduc; 361 (13.77%)	
District 5	Councillor	2,111	**René Leblanc**; 835 (39.55%)	Armand Lavoie; 438 (20.75%)	Géraldine Courchesne; 434 (20.56%)	Fernand Lachapelle; 267 (12.65%) André Marquette; 137 (6.49%)	
District 6	Councillor	2,057	Robert H. Tremblay; 672 (32.67%)	Luc Salinovitch; 604 (29.37%)	**Lorenzo Defoy**; 781 (37.97%)		
District 7	Councillor	1,337	**Paul-Auguste Briand**; 698 (52.21%)	Olivette Camaraire; 464 (34.70%)	Gérard Thibeault; 175 (13.09%)		
District 8	Councillor	1,471	**Gilles Déry**; 594 (40.38%)	Lorraine Vaillancourt; 549 (37.32%)	Guy D'Amour; 328 (22.30%)		
District 9	Councillor	2,170	Pierre Baril; 849 (39.12%)	**Pierre Nantel**; 923 (42.53%)	Régent Simard; 398 (18.34%)		
District 10	Councillor	2,022	**Jacques Finet**; 996 (49.26%)	André Meunier; 871 (43.08%)	Pauline Fleury; 155 (7.67%)		
District 11	Councillor	1,612	**Serge Sévigny**; 616 (38.21%)	Georges Cowan; 554 (34.37%)		Lucien Lebrun; 442 (27.42%)	
District 12	Councillor	1,543	Omer Leclerc; 600 (38.89%)	**J. Paul Vermette**; 874 (56.64%)	Francine Charest Beaucage; 69 (4.47%)		
District 13	Councillor	2,503	Pauline Nicolas; 670 (26.77%)	**Jeannine Labelle**; 924 (36.92%)	André Lizotte; 504 (20.14%)	Denis Côté; 405 (16.18%)	
District 14	Councillor	1,623	Roméo Lescarbeau; 437 (26.93%)	**Paul-Émile Paquin**; 709 (43.68%)	Marcel Bertrand; 233 (14.36%)	Florent Charest; 244 (15.03%)	
District 15	Councillor	1,822	**Jacques Laplante**; 868 (47.64%)	Jean Raymond Payette; 554 (30.41%)	Michel Timperio; 400 (21.95%)		
District 16	Councillor	2,051	Bernard Audet; 938 (45.73%)	**Benoît Danault**; 947 (46.17%)	Fernand Boudreault; 166 (8.09%)		
District 17	Councillor	1,375	**André Létourneau**; 827 (60.15%)	Nicole Therrien; 408 (29.67%)	Françoise Gagné; 140 (10.18%)		

Post-election changes:

- Paul-Auguste Briand was subsequently expelled from the Parti municipal for breaking with the party on a vote pertaining to the Place Longueuil. This deprived by Parti municipal of its working majority on council.

Source: Le Parti municipal de Longueuil: Les origines du Parti municipal, Société historique et culturelle du Marigot, accessed January 10, 2014.
