= Frank Venneri =

Canadian politician

Montreal City Councillor for the François-Perrault ward (known as the Jean-Rivard ward from 2001 to 2009)
- In office 2001–2013
- Preceded by: Nicole Roy-Arcelin
- Succeeded by: Sylvain Ouellet
- In office 1998–2001
- Preceded by: Vittorio Capparelli
- Succeeded by: ward redistributed
- In office 1986–1990
- Preceded by: Rocco Luccisano
- Succeeded by: Vittorio Capparelli

Personal details
- Party: Montreal Citizens' Movement (1986-1989); Montreal Municipal Party (1989-1992); Civic Party of Montreal (1992-1994); Montrealers' Party (1994-1995); Vision Montreal(1998-2003); Union Montreal (2003-2012); Independent (2012-)

Frank Venneri is a politician in Montreal, Quebec, Canada. He served on the Montreal city council from 1986 to 1990, was re-elected in 1998, and has been returned to council in every election since then. Venneri is an independent councillor.

== Private career ==
Venneri owned a hairstyling salon for over two decades before his election to city council and served as president of the Saint-Michel Optimist Club. He owned a men's hairstyling salon during his time out of council in the 1990s. In 1995, he spoke against a proposed municipal by-law to permit hair salons in private homes.

== First council term (1986–1990) ==
Venneri was first elected to council in 1986 municipal election for the east-end François-Perrault division. Running for the progressive Montreal Citizens' Movement (MCM), he defeated incumbent councillor Rocco Luccisano of Civic Party of Montreal (CPM). The MCM won a landslide victory in this election under Jean Doré's leadership. Venneri was initially a backbench supporter of the Doré administration and served as a city representative on the regional Montreal Urban Community.

In 1987, Venneri spoke against Miron Inc.'s plans to continue operating a cement-mixing business near his ward that had long been subject to complaints about noise, pollution, and heavy traffic. Miron's original quarry site had been purchased by the city in 1984 and shut down, but, due to an administrative error, the company later received a permit to build a new factory in the same area. The Montreal executive committee later revoked Miron's permit, but Venneri charged that the company did not immediately comply with this decision. The city was ultimately able to take over the site without incident, and the quarry was demolished a year later.

Venneri ran as a Progressive Conservative Party of Canada candidate in the 1988 Canadian federal election in the division of Papineau—Saint-Michel. As the MCM's constitution prevented party members from running for other parties (at any level of government), he was required to resign from caucus and sit as an independent councillor. Some political pundits believed that Venneri could win election to the House of Commons of Canada, but he ultimately finished second against Liberal incumbent André Ouellet.

Venneri did not rejoin the MCM after the federal election, and he formally severed his ties with that party in November 1989 to join the newly formed Montreal Municipal Party (MMP). He ran under the latter party's banner in the 1990 municipal election and was defeated by fellow incumbent Vittorio Capparelli, an MCM councillor whose previous ward had been eliminated by redistribution.

== Out of council ==
The MMP fell victim to internal divisions after the 1990 election, and in 1992 the party leadership announced plans to merge with the Civic Party. The merger never formally took place, but many Municipal Party members later joined the Civic Party as individuals. Venneri was among these, serving as the CPM's vice-president in an unsuccessful attempt to relaunch the in during the buildup to the 1994 municipal election. The CPM was unable to find a mayoral candidate, and in August 1994 Venneri helped merge the venerable organization into the newly formed Montrealers' Party. Venneri himself was the CPM's interim president and de facto leader in the final days of the party's existence.

Venneri ran for the Montrealers' Party in the 1994 municipal election and finished third against Vittorio Capparelli, who had by this time joined the Vision Montreal (VM) party. The Montrealers' Party dissolved the following year, with Venneri remarking that its questionable financial strategies had doomed it from the start.

== Return to council (1998–2013) ==
Venneri was re-elected to Montreal city council as a Vision Montreal candidate in the 1998 election in a rematch against Capparelli, who had left Vision Montreal the previous year and rejoined the MCM. Vision Montreal won a council majority, and Venneri served for the next three years as a backbench supporter of Pierre Bourque's administration. He was re-elected in the 2001 election for the redistributed Jean-Rivard division; Gérald Tremblay's Montreal Island Citizens Union (MICU) won this election, and Venneri served with the official opposition.

In December 2003, Venneri and five other Vision Montreal councillors left Bourque's party to join MICU. This allowed Tremblay to consolidate his majority on council, and in January 2004 Venneri was named vice-chair of Montreal's finance committee. He was re-elected as a MICU candidate in the 2005 election, again defeating Capparelli, who had by this time rejoined Vision Montreal. The Jean-Rivard electoral division was renamed as the François-Perrault division for this election, though it had different boundaries from the previous division of that name.

Venneri remained vice-chair of Montreal's finance committee after the election and also served on the city's committee on services to residents. He was elected to a fifth term on council in the 2009 municipal election, for Tremblay's renamed Union Montreal party. He resigned from Union Montreal on November 14, 2012, shortly after Tremblay resigned as mayor amid the backdrop of a serious corruption scandal.

By virtue of holding his city council seat, he also serves on the Villeray—Saint-Michel—Parc-Extension borough council.

== Electoral record ==
2009 Montreal municipal election: Councillor, François-Perrault division
Party	Candidate	Votes	%
Union Montreal	(x)Frank Venneri	2,877	36.26
Vision Montreal	Harry Delva	2,556	32.22
Projet Montréal	Marie-Josée Beauchamp	2,219	27.97
Independent	Guillaume Blouin-Beaudoin	282	3.55
Total valid votes		7,934	100
Source: Election results, 2009, City of Montreal.

2005 Montreal municipal election: Councillor, François-Perrault
Party	Candidate	Votes	%
Montreal Island Citizens Union	Frank Venneri (incumbent)	3,206	42.63
Vision Montreal	Vittorio Capparelli	2,966	39.44
Projet Montréal	Maria Marra	1,348	17.93
Total valid votes		7,520	100
Source: City of Montreal official results (in French), City of Montreal.

2001 Montreal municipal election: Councillor, Jean-Rivard
Party	Candidate	Votes	%
Vision Montreal	Frank Venneri (incumbent)	4,548	58.04
Montreal Island Citizens Union	Daniel Boucher	2,968	37.88
White Elephant Party	Charles Paradis	320	4.08
Total valid votes		7,836	100
Source: Election results, 1833-2005 (in French), City of Montreal.

1998 Montreal municipal election: Councillor, François-Perrault
Party	Candidate	Votes	%
Vision Montreal	Frank Venneri	2,622	49.05
Montreal Citizens' Movement	(x)Vittorio Capparelli	1,277	23.89
New Montreal	Lanise Hayes	780	14.59
Team Montreal	Yasmin Bautista	420	7.86
Independent	Michel Handfield	247	4.62
Total valid votes		5,346	100
Source: Official Results, City of Montreal

1994 Montreal municipal election: Councillor, François-Perrault
Party	Candidate	Votes	%
Vision Montreal	Vittorio Capparelli	2,277	48.16
Montreal Citizens' Movement	Lyse Brunet	1,303	27.56
Montrealers' Party	Frank Venneri	1,000	21.15
Democratic Coalition–Ecology Montreal	Mario Laquerre	148	3.13
Total valid votes		4,728	100
Source: Official Results, City of Montreal

1990 Montreal municipal election: Councillor, François-Perrault
Party	Candidate	Votes	%
Montreal Citizens' Movement	Vittorio Capparelli (incumbent)	1,757	43.66
Municipal Party	Frank Venneri (incumbent)	1,142	28.38
Civic Party of Montreal	Serge Bélanger	1,125	27.96
Total valid votes		4,024	100
Source: Election results, 1833-2005 (in French), City of Montreal.

1988 Canadian federal election: Papineau
Party	Candidate	Votes	%	±%	Expenditures
Liberal	André Ouellet	18,122	45.99	–	$43,413
Progressive Conservative	Frank Venneri	13,094	33.23		$39,468
New Democratic	Giovanni Adamo	5,948	15.10		$22,192
Rhinoceros	Carole Ola Clermont	987	2.51	–	$0
Green	H. Joseph Vega	469	1.19	–	$0
Communist	Line Chabot	235	0.60		$18
Marxist–Leninist	Francine Tremblay	193	0.49		$130
Revolutionary Workers League	Michel Dugré	178	0.45		$513
Commonwealth of Canada	Normand Bélanger	174	0.44		$0
Total valid votes		39,400	100.00		
Total rejected ballots		907			
Turnout		40,307	70.14		
Electors on the lists		57,470			
Source: Report of the Chief Electoral Officer, Thirty-fourth General Election, 1988.

1986 Montreal municipal election: Councillor, François-Perrault
Party	Candidate	Votes	%
Montreal Citizens' Movement	Frank Venneri	3,564	62.66
Civic Party of Montreal	Rocco Luccisano (incumbent)	2,124	37.34
Total valid votes		5,688	100
Source: Election results, 1833-2005 (in French), City of Montreal.
