= 1982 Montreal municipal election =

Election in Quebec, Canada

The 1982 Montreal municipal election took place on November 14, 1982, to elect a mayor and city councillors in Montreal, Quebec, Canada. Longtime mayor Jean Drapeau was re-elected for what turned out to be his final term in office, defeating challenger Jean Doré.

Elections were also held in Montreal's suburban communities in November 1982. Most suburban elections were held on November 7.

== Results ==
Mayor

1982 Montreal municipal election: Mayor of Montreal
| Party | Candidate | Votes | % |
|---|---|---|---|
| Civic Party of Montreal | Jean Drapeau (incumbent) | 174,306 | 48.10 |
| Montreal Citizens' Movement | Jean Doré | 129,706 | 35.79 |
| Municipal Action Group | Henri-Paul Vignola | 54,890 | 15.15 |
| Independent | Gilles Gervais | 1,397 | 0.39 |
| Independent | Patricia Métivier | 1,222 | 0.34 |
| Independent | Katy Le Rougetel | 892 | 0.25 |
| Total valid votes | | 362,413 | 100 |
Source: Election results, 1833-2005 (in French), City of Montreal.

Council (incomplete)

Party colours do not indicate affiliation with or resemblance to a provincial or a federal party.

| Electoral District | Position | Total valid votes | Candidates | | | | Incumbent |
| Electoral District | Position | Total valid votes | Montreal Citizens' Movement | Civic Party | Municipal Action Group | Independents | Incumbent |
|---|---|---|---|---|---|---|---|
| Longue-Pointe | City councillor | 6,754 | Nicole Boudreau; 2,793 (41.35%) | Luc Larivée; 3,463 (51.27%) | Nola Poirier; 498 (7.37%) | | Luc Larivée |

1982 Montreal municipal election: Councillor, Hochelaga
| Party | Candidate | Votes | % |
|---|---|---|---|
| Civic Party of Montreal | Pierre Lorange (incumbent) | 3,669 | 63.34 |
| Montreal Citizens' Movement | Robert Aubin | 1,382 | 23.86 |
| Municipal Action Group | Jean Guimond | 742 | 12.81 |
| Total valid votes | | 5,793 | 100 |
Source: Election results, 1833-2005 (in French), City of Montreal.

1982 Montreal municipal election: Councillor, François-Perrault
| Party | Candidate | Votes | % |
|---|---|---|---|
| Civic Party of Montreal | Rocco Luccisano (incumbent) | 3,525 | 54.45 |
| Montreal Citizens' Movement | Rolland Masson | 2,102 | 32.47 |
| Municipal Action Group | William Siemienski | 847 | 13.08 |
| Total valid votes | | 6,474 | 100 |
Source: Election results, 1833-2005 (in French), City of Montreal.

1982 Montreal municipal election: Councillor, Gabriel-Sagard
| Party | Candidate | Votes | % |
|---|---|---|---|
| Civic Party of Montreal | Marc Beaudoin (incumbent) | 3,448 | 50.26 |
| Montreal Citizens' Movement | Consolato Gattuso | 1,900 | 27.69 |
| Municipal Action Group | Pierre Harel | 1,124 | 16.38 |
| Independent | Marcel Paquet | 389 | 5.67 |
| Total valid votes | | 6,861 | 100 |
Source: Election results, 1833-2005 (in French), City of Montreal.

1982 Montreal municipal election: Councillor, Jean-Talon
| Party | Candidate | Votes | % |
|---|---|---|---|
| Civic Party of Montreal | George Savoidakis (incumbent) | 3,118 | 52.55 |
| Montreal Citizens' Movement | Vittorio Capparelli | 1,481 | 24.96 |
| Municipal Action Group | Gino Gentile | 1,113 | 18.76 |
| Independent | Nicola L. Corbo | 221 | 3.72 |
| Total valid votes | | 5,933 | 100 |
Source: Election results, 1833-2005 (in French), City of Montreal.

1982 Montreal municipal election: Councillor, Laurier
| Party | Candidate | Votes | % |
|---|---|---|---|
| Montreal Citizens' Movement | Robert Perreault | 2,635 | 49.73 |
| Civic Party of Montreal | Roger Larivée (incumbent) | 2,137 | 40.33 |
| Municipal Action Group | Gilles Côté | 527 | 9.95 |
| Total valid votes | | 5,299 | 100 |
Source: Election results, 1833-2005 (in French), City of Montreal.

1982 Montreal municipal election: Councillor, Sainte-Marie
| Party | Candidate | Votes | % |
|---|---|---|---|
| Civic Party of Montreal | Serge Bélanger (incumbent) | 3,342 | 52.23 |
| Montreal Citizens' Movement | Roger Marchand | 2,751 | 42.99 |
| Municipal Action Group | Gaétan Toussaint | 306 | 4.78 |
| Total valid votes | | 6,399 | 100 |
Source: Election results, 1833-2005 (in French), City of Montreal.

1982 Montreal municipal election: Councillor, Ville-Marie
| Party | Candidate | Votes | % |
|---|---|---|---|
| Montreal Citizens' Movement | John Gardiner | 2,459 | 49.49 |
| Civic Party of Montreal | Joffre Laporte (incumbent) | 1,689 | 33.99 |
| Municipal Action Group | Mona Forrest | 652 | 13.12 |
| Independent | Kenneth Cheung | 169 | 3.40 |
| Total valid votes | | 4,969 | 100 |
Source: Election results, 1833-2005 (in French), City of Montreal.

1982 Montreal municipal election: Councillor, Saint-Henri
| Party | Candidate | Votes | % |
|---|---|---|---|
| Civic Party of Montreal | Germain Prégent (incumbent) | 4,379 | 73.61 |
| Montreal Citizens' Movement | Raymond Drennan | 960 | 16.14 |
| Municipal Action Group | Jean-Louis Durocher | 610 | 10.25 |
| Total valid votes | | 5,949 | 100 |
Source: Election results, 1833-2005 (in French), City of Montreal.

== Information about the candidates ==
Municipal Action Group

- Gino Gentile (Jean-Talon) was a first-time candidate.

Independents

- Nicola L. Corbo (Jean-Talon) was a first-time candidate.

== Results in suburban communities ==
=== Dorval ===
| Electoral District | Position | Total valid votes | Candidates | | | | | Incumbent |
| Electoral District | Position | Total valid votes | Winner | Second place | Third place | Fourth place | Fifth place | Incumbent |
|---|---|---|---|---|---|---|---|---|
| | Mayor | 6,302 | Peter Yeomans; 4,430 (70.30%) | Roger Blais; 1,632 (25.90%) | Pierre Santini; 240 (3.80%) | | | Sarto Desnoyers |
| East Ward 1 | Councillor | 3,152 | Edgar Rouleau; 2,141 (67.93%) | Fernand Claude; 1,011 (32.07%) | | | | |
| East Ward 2 | Councillor | 3,201 | Emile Lacoste; 1,673 (52.26%) | Denise Descary Cardinale; 1,528 (47.74%) | | | | |
| East Ward 3 | Councillor | 2,940 | Jules Daigle; 2,176 (74.01%) | Gerard Carpentier; 764 (25.99%) | | | | Jules Daigle |
| West Ward 1 | Councillor | 3,049 | Robert M. Bourbeau; 1,400 (45.92%) | Robert Viborg; 1,010 (33.13%) | Michel Paquette; 639 (20.96%) | | | |
| West Ward 2 | Councillor | 3,023 | Ian W. Heron; 1,365 (45.15%) | Louis Lefebvre; 756 (25.01%) | Sandra Keightley; 590 (19.52%) | Donald Bilney; 175 (5.79%) | Vito Lamorte; 137 (4.53%) | |
| West Ward 3 | Councillor | - | Frank Richmond (acclaimed) | | | | | Frank Richmond |

Source: Montreal Gazette, November 8, 1982, A6.

=== Montréal-Nord ===
| Electoral District | Position | Total valid votes | Candidates | | Incumbent |
| Electoral District | Position | Total valid votes | Renouveau municipal | Others | Incumbent |
|---|---|---|---|---|---|
| | Mayor | 26,070 | Yves Ryan; 22,490 (86.27%) | Suzel Hébert-Godin; 3,580 (13.73%) | Yves Ryan |
| Ward One | Councillor | 1,856 | Antonin Dupont; 1,402 (75.54%) | L. Thibault; 454 (24.46%) | - |
| Ward Two | Councillor | 2,232 | Ernest Chartrand; 1,887 (84.54%) | Giuseppe Altomare; 345 (15.46%) | Ernest Chartrand (incumbent for West Quarter, Seat Two) |
| Ward Three | Councillor | 3,126 | Pierre Blain; 2,552 (81.64%) | Pierre Lacombe; 574 (18.36%) | Pierre Blain (incumbent for West Quarter, Seat One) |
| Ward Four | Councillor | 1,902 | Georgette Morin; 1,022 (53.73%) | Morache; 571 (30.02%) Bernard Lebrun; 260 (13.67%) Petit 49 (2.58%) | - |
| Ward Five | Councillor | 2,233 | Maurice Bélanger; 1,644 (73.62%) | André Elliott; 509 (22.79%) Kenyon; 80 (3.58%) | Maurice Bélanger (incumbent for Center Quarter, Seat Two) |
| Ward Six | Councillor | 1,902 | Réal Gibeau; 1,521 (79.97%) | Madeleine Aubertin; 381 (20.03%) | Réal Gibeau (incumbent for Center Quarter, Seat One) |
| Ward Seven | Councillor | 2,101 | Jean-Paul Lessard; 1,638 (77.96%) | Roland Gagne; 463 (22.04%) | Jean-Paul Lessard (incumbent for East Quarter, Seat One) |
| Ward Eight | Councillor | 2,188 | Normand Fortin; 1,694 (77.42%) | Richard Robert; 494 (22.58%) | Normand Fortin (incumbent for Center Quarter, Seat Two) |
| Ward Nine | Councillor | 1,924 | Armand Nadeau; 1,483 (77.08%) | Pierre Laperrière; 441 (22.92%) | - |
| Ward Ten | Councillor | 2,830 | André Coulombe; 1,394 (49.26%) | Phemens (sp?); 1,112 (39.29%) Victor-Levy Beaulieu; 324 (11.45%) | - |
| Ward Eleven | Councillor | 1,503 | Raymond Paquin; 1,124 (74.78%) | Pierre Robert; 229 (15.24%) Tiberio; 150 (9.98%) | - |
| Ward Twelve | Councillor | 1,712 | Robert Guerrero; 1,367 (79.84%) | André Houle; 345 (20.15%) | - |

Sources: Montreal Gazette, 6 November 1982, A6; Montreal Gazette, 8 November 1982, A6.

Saint-Leonard

1982 Saint-Leonard municipal election: Councillor, Ward Two
| Party | Candidate | Votes | % |
|---|---|---|---|
| Union municipale de Saint-Léonard | Tommaso Nanci (incumbent) | 795 | 42.09 |
| Équipe du renouveau de la cité de Saint-Léonard | Joseph Mormina | 778 | 41.19 |
| Parti de l'alliance municipale | Vincent Galati | 316 | 16.73 |
| Total valid votes | | 1,889 | 100 |
Source: Le Journal de Saint-Léonard, 9 November 1982, pp. 2-4.

1982 Saint-Leonard municipal election: Councillor, Ward Three
| Party | Candidate | Votes | % |
|---|---|---|---|
| Équipe du renouveau de la cité de Saint-Léonard | Domenico Moschella | 984 | 45.16 |
| Union municipale de Saint-Léonard | Yvon Desrochers | 875 | 40.16 |
| Parti de l'alliance municipale | Liborio Sciascia | 320 | 14.69 |
| Total valid votes | | 2,179 | 100 |
Source: Le Journal de Saint-Léonard, 9 November 1982, pp. 2-4.

1982 Saint-Leonard municipal election: Councillor, Ward Five
| Party | Candidate | Votes | % |
|---|---|---|---|
| Équipe du renouveau de la cité de Saint-Léonard | Raymond Renaud (incumbent) | 970 | 44.62 |
| Union municipale de Saint-Léonard | Pasquale Buttino | 622 | 28.61 |
| Parti de l'alliance municipale | Michel Morin | 582 | 26.77 |
| Total valid votes | | 2,174 | 100 |
Source: Le Journal de Saint-Léonard, 9 November 1982, pp. 2-4.

1982 Saint-Leonard municipal election: Councillor, Ward Six
| Party | Candidate | Votes | % |
|---|---|---|---|
| Équipe du renouveau de la cité de Saint-Léonard | Dominic Perri | 1,112 | 52.11 |
| Union municipale de Saint-Léonard | Eduardo di Bennardo (incumbent) | 631 | 29.57 |
| Parti de l'alliance municipale | Fiorino Bianco | 391 | 18.32 |
| Total valid votes | | 2,134 | 100 |
Source: Le Journal de Saint-Léonard, 9 November 1982, pp. 2-4.

1982 Saint-Leonard municipal election: Councillor, Ward Eight
| Party | Candidate | Votes | % |
|---|---|---|---|
| Équipe du renouveau de la cité de Saint-Léonard | Basilio Giordano | 910 | 48.56 |
| Union municipale de Saint-Léonard | Rosario Ortona (incumbent) | 648 | 34.58 |
| Parti de l'alliance municipale | Micheline Neveu | 316 | 16.86 |
| Total valid votes | | 1,874 | 100 |
Source: Le Journal de Saint-Léonard, 9 November 1982, pp. 2-4.

1982 Saint-Leonard municipal election: Councillor, Ward Ten
| Party | Candidate | Votes | % |
|---|---|---|---|
| Équipe du renouveau de la cité de Saint-Léonard | Pierre Paquet | 961 | 38.49 |
| Parti de l'alliance municipale | Jules Lauzon (incumbent) | 913 | 36.56 |
| Union municipale de Saint-Léonard | Claude Beriault | 463 | 18.54 |
| Independent | Agostino Cannavino | 160 | 6.41 |
| Total valid votes | | 2,497 | 100 |
Source: Le Journal de Saint-Léonard, 9 November 1982, pp. 2-4.

1982 Saint-Leonard municipal election: Councillor, Ward Twelve
| Party | Candidate | Votes | % |
|---|---|---|---|
| Équipe du renouveau de la cité de Saint-Léonard | Maurice Benoît | 926 | 42.95 |
| Union municipale de Saint-Léonard | Alfonso Gagliano | 724 | 33.58 |
| Parti de l'alliance municipale | Giuseppe Corneli | 506 | 23.47 |
| Total valid votes | | 2,156 | 100 |
Source: Le Journal de Saint-Léonard, 9 November 1982, pp. 2-4.

subsequent by-elections

Anjou municipal by-election, September 9, 1984: Councillor, Lucie Bruneau
| Candidate | Votes | % |
|---|---|---|
| Michel Massue | 547 | 52.34 |
| Pierre Charbonneau | 297 | 28.42 |
| Mireille Beaudry | 195 | 18.66 |
| Leon Gerszon | 6 | 0.57 |
| Total valid votes | 1,045 | 100 |
Source: Montreal Gazette (East Island edition), 12 September 1984, p. 1. The by-election was caused by the resignation of Jean-Paul Morin in July 1984.

Saint-Leonard municipal by-election, 30 September 1984: Mayor
| Party | Candidate | Votes | % |
|---|---|---|---|
| Ralliement de Saint-Léonard | Raymond Renaud | 10,307 | 48.57 |
| Action civique de Saint-Léonard | Domenico Moschella | 5,568 | 26.24 |
| Union municipale de Saint-Léonard | Rosario Ortona | 5,348 | 25.20 |
| Total valid votes | | 21,223 | 100 |
Sources: Il Settimanale, 11 September 1984; Montreal Gazette, 1 October 1984.

Saint-Leonard municipal by-election, 21 April 1985: Councillor, Ward Eleven
| Party | Candidate | Votes | % |
|---|---|---|---|
| Ralliement de Saint-Léonard | Jean-Jacques Goyette | 390 | 27.31 |
| Union municipale de Saint-Léonard | Marcel Gaudreault | 349 | 24.44 |
| Action civique de Saint-Léonard | Vittorio Galerio | 307 | 21.50 |
| Independent | Fiorino Bianco | 293 | 20.52 |
| Independent | Jeannette Masse | 89 | 6.23 |
| Total valid votes | | 1,428 | 100 |
Source: "Ruling party's candidate wins St. Leonard seat," Montreal Gazette, 24 April 1985, p. 1.

== Information about the candidates in suburban communities ==
=== Saint-Leonard ===
Équipe du renouveau de la cité de Saint-Léonard

- Pierre Paquet (Ward Ten) was a Montreal lawyer during the 1980s. He was elected to council in 1982 in his first bid for public office. When the Équipe du renouveau dissolved in 1984, he joined Raymond Renaud's Ralliement de Saint-Léonard, but was dropped from that party's list before 1986 election amid disputed circumstances. Renaud said that Paquet had been largely inactive on council, while Paquet said he had been blocked for asking too many serious questions.

Union municipale de Saint-Léonard

- Eduardo di Bennardo (Ward Six) was elected to the Saint-Leonard city council in 1978 as a candidate of the Parti de l'alliance municipale. He was defeated in 1982, running for Union municipal.
- Claude Beriault (Ward Ten) appears to have been a first-time candidate.

== Results in other Montreal-area communities ==
=== Longueuil ===
Jacques Finet of the Parti municipal de Longueuil was elected to his first term as mayor, defeating incumbent Marcel Robidas from the Parti civique de Longueuil. The Parti municipal also won fifteen council seats, as against four for the Parti civique.

Winning candidates are listed in boldface.

| Electoral District | Position | Total valid votes | Candidates | | | Incumbent |
| Electoral District | Position | Total valid votes | Parti municipal | Parti civique | Independent | Incumbent |
|---|---|---|---|---|---|---|
| | Mayor | 39,301 | **Jacques Finet**; 19,157 (48.74%) | Marcel Robidas; 19,075 (48.54%) | Jacques Gendron; 1,069 (2.72%) | Marcel Robidas |
| District 1 | Councillor | 1,813 | Serge Rathier; 606 (33.43%) | **Jacques Bouchard**; 802 (44.24%) | Henri Bouclin; 205 (11.31%) V. Bourcier; 200 (11.03%) | Jacques Bouchard |
| District 2 | Councillor | 1,935 | **Serge Robillard**; 1,100 (56.85%) | Marcel Tessier; 835 (43.15%) | | Georges Touten |
| District 3 | Councillor | 1,949 | **Claude Gladu**; 1,010 (51.82%) | Léonard Boulet; 838 (43.00%) | André Marquette; 101 (5.18%) | Léonard Boulet |
| District 4 | Councillor | 2,412 | **Roger Ferland**; 1,436 (59.54%) | Yves Lalonde; 877 (36.36%) | H.-P. Germain; 99 (4.10%) | Roger Ferland |
| District 5 | Councillor | 2,352 | **Nicole Béliveau**; 896 (38.10%) | Géraldine Courchesne; 773 (32.87%) | Robert H. Tremblay; 253 (10.76%) M. Robillard; 221 (9.40%) G. Dorais; 209 (8.89%) | René Leblanc |
| District 6 | Councillor | 2,284 | **Jacques Morissette**; 1,183 (51.80%) | Richard Defoy; 953 (41.73%) | Luc Salinovich; 148 (6.48%) | Lorenzo Defoy |
| District 7 | Councillor | 1,621 | **Roger Lacombe**; 712 (43.92%) | Gérard Thibeault; 342 (21.10%) | Paul-Auguste Briand; 567 (34.98%) | Paul-Auguste Briand |
| District 8 | Councillor | 2,105 | **Gilles Déry**; 1,284 (61.00%) | Nicole Therrien; 821 (39.00%) | | Gilles Déry |
| District 9 | Councillor | 2,567 | M. Richard; 1,200 (46.75%) | **Pierre Nantel**; 1,367 (53.25%) | | Pierre Nantel |
| District 10 | Councillor | 2,267 | **Florence Mercier**; 1,492 (65.81%) | Louis-René Simard; 775 (34.19%) | | Jacques Finet |
| District 11 | Councillor | 1,911 | **Serge Sévigny**; 1,016 (53.17%) | Lucien Lebrun; 895 (46.83%) | | Serge Sévigny |
| District 12 | Councillor | 1,506 | **Lise Sauvé**; 814 (54.05%) | Jean-Paul Vermette; 692 (45.95%) | | Jean-Paul Vermette |
| District 13 | Councillor | 2,018 | Solange Boiteau; 676 (33.50%) | **Jean-Pierre Trahan**; 839 (41.58%) | Omer Leclerc; 503 (24.93%) | Jeannine Labelle |
| District 14 | Councillor | 2,018 | **Michel Timperio**; 1,091 (54.06%) | Jeannine Lavoie-Picard; 927 (45.94%) | | Paul-Émile Paquin |
| District 15 | Councillor | 1,899 | Florent Charest; 810 (42.65%) | Paul-Émile Paquin; 707 (37.23%) | M. Turgeon; 382 (20.12%) | Jacques Laplante |
| District 16 | Councillor | 1,948 | Georges Touten; 960 (49.28%) | **Gaétan Baillargeon**; 988 (50.72%) | | Benoît Danault |
| District 17 | Councillor | 1,589 | **André Létourneau**; 1,015 (63.88%) | Didier Robidas; 574 (36.12%) | | André Létourneau |
| District 18 | Councillor | 2,208 | **Jacques Laplante**; 1,176 (53.26%) | Laurence Juneau; 1,032 (46.74%) | | new division |
| District 19 | Councillor | 2,979 | **Benoît Danault**; 1,978 (66.40%) | G. Grenier; 1,001 (33.60%) | | new division |

Source: Le Parti municipal de Longueuil: Le premier mandat 1978 - 1982, Société historique et culturelle du Marigot, accessed January 22, 2014.
