= 1970 Montreal municipal election =

Election in Quebec, Canada

The 1970 Montreal municipal election took place on October 25, 1970, to elected a mayor and city councillors in Montreal, Quebec, Canada. The election was held against the backdrop of the FLQ Crisis.

Mayor Jean Drapeau was re-elected without difficulty, shutting out the oppositionist Front d'action politique (FRAP) party. The election was held during the October Crisis and Drapeau as well as federal cabinet minister Jean Marchand, accused the left-wing FRAP of being sympathetic to the Front de libération du Québec (FLQ). Support for the FRAP collapsed and Drapeau's Civic Party of Montreal won every seat on city council.

== Results ==
Mayor

1970 Montreal municipal election: Mayor of Montreal
Candidate	Votes	%
(x)Jean Drapeau	339,215	91.89
André Desmarais	11,072	3.00
Manon Leger	7,189	1.95
Joseph Abraham	3,831	1.04
Jean-Guy Robillard	3,492	0.95
Claude Longtin	3,442	0.93
Lucien Monette	1,269	0.34
Total valid votes	369,150	100
Source: Election results, 1833-2005 (in French), City of Montreal.

Council (incomplete)

1970 Montreal municipal election: Councillor, Maisonneuve, Ward One
Candidate	Votes	%
(x)Pierre Lorange	20,430	86.41
Marcel Bureau	3,213	13.59
Total valid votes	23,643	100
Source: Election results, 1833-2005 (in French), City of Montreal.

1970 Montreal municipal election: Councillor, Saint-Michel, Ward One
Candidate	Votes	%
Rocco Luccisano	9,092	57.24
(x)Nicola Ciamarra	4,445	27.99
Raymond Bourget	2,346	14.77
Total valid votes	15,883	100
Source: Election results, 1833-2005 (in French), City of Montreal.
