= Équipe démocratique de Saint-Léonard =

The Équipe démocratique de Saint-Léonard (EDSL) was a short-lived municipal political party in the suburban community of Saint-Leonard in Montreal, Quebec, Canada.

The EDSL was formed in October 1986 to support André Bastien's mayoral bid. It also fielded a full slate of candidates for council, the most prominent of whom were incumbent councillor André Chrétien and former councillor Jules Lauzon. Both Chrétien and Lauzon, along with other leading figures in EDSL, had previously been members of the Parti de l'alliance municipale (PAM).

The EDSL promised to reduce property taxes, lower fees for recreation facilities, and prohibit construction in municipal parks to protect green space. Bastien finished third against incumbent mayor Raymond Renaud of the Ralliement de Saint-Léonard, while Chrétien was re-elected in Saint-Leonard's ninth ward, and Lauzon nearly missed winning election in the tenth ward. No other EDSL candidates came close to being elected.

The EDSL seems to have become inactive after the 1986 election. Chrétien served for a time as an independent councillor and later joined Frank Zampino's Parti municipal.
