= 1974 Montreal municipal election =

Election in Quebec, Canada

The 1974 Montreal municipal election took place on 10 November 1974, to elect a mayor and city councillors in Montreal, Quebec, Canada. Longtime mayor Jean Drapeau was re-elected to another four-year term in office.

Elections were also held one week earlier in suburban communities on the Island of Montreal.

== Results ==
Mayor

1974 Montreal municipal election: Mayor of Montreal
Party	Candidate	Votes	%
Civic Party of Montreal	Jean Drapeau (incumbent)	149,643	55.07
Montreal Citizens' Movement	Jacques Couture	106,217	39.09
Democracy Montreal	Jacques Brisebois	10,557	3.88
Independent	Patricia Métivier	3,114	1.15
Ligue Socialiste Ouvrière	Paul Kouri	2,218	0.82
Total valid votes		271,749	100
Source: Election results, 1833-2005 (in French), City of Montreal. Party affiliations are taken from the Montreal Star, 11 November 1974, A11.

Council (incomplete)

1974 Montreal municipal election: Councillor, Maisonneuve, Ward One
Party	Candidate	Votes	%
Civic Party of Montreal	Pierre Lorange (incumbent)	9,067	57.18
Montreal Citizens' Movement	Raymond Faucher	6,789	42.82
Total valid votes		15,856	100
Source: Election results, 1833-2005 (in French), City of Montreal. Party affiliations are taken from the Montreal Star, 11 November 1974, A11.

1974 Montreal municipal election: Councillor, Papineau, Ward Two
Party	Candidate	Votes	%
Civic Party of Montreal	Serge Bélanger	6,056	51.53
Montreal Citizens' Movement	Michel Boisvert	5,697	48.47
Total valid votes		11,753	100
Source: Election results, 1833-2005 (in French), City of Montreal. Party affiliations are taken from the Montreal Star, 11 November 1974, A11.

1974 Montreal municipal election: Councillor, Saint-Jacques, Ward Two
Party	Candidate	Votes	%
Montreal Citizens' Movement	Raymond Poulin	6,025	47.19
Civic Party of Montreal	Aimé Y. Charron	4,880	38.22
Independent	Roger Larivée	1,175	9.20
Democracy Montreal	Léo Manseau	688	5.39
Total valid votes		12,768	100
Source: Election results, 1833-2005 (in French), City of Montreal. Party affiliations are taken from the Montreal Star, 11 November 1974, A11.

1974 Montreal municipal election: Councillor, Saint-Louis, Ward Two
Party	Candidate	Votes	%
Montreal Citizens' Movement	John Gardiner	6,553	53.54
Civic Party of Montreal	Hyman Brock (incumbent)	4,616	37.71
Democracy Montreal	Gérald Friedlansky	1,071	8.75
Total valid votes		12,240	100
Source: Election results, 1833-2005 (in French), City of Montreal. Party affiliations are taken from the Montreal Star, 11 November 1974, A11.

1974 Montreal municipal election: Councillor, Saint-Michel, Ward One
Party	Candidate	Votes	%
Civic Party of Montreal	Rocco Luccisano (incumbent)	6,883	51.99
Montreal Citizens' Movement	Diego Bronzati	6,355	48.01
Total valid votes		13,238	100
Source: Election results, 1833-2005 (in French), City of Montreal. Party affiliations are taken from the Montreal Star, 11 November 1974, A11.

== Results in Suburban Communities (incomplete) ==
=== Montreal North ===
1974 Montreal municipal election: Mayor of Montreal North
Candidate	Votes	%
Yves Ryan (incumbent)	14,824	90.12
Paul Rochon	1,625	9.88
Total valid votes	16,449	100
Source: Montreal Star, 4 November 1974, A10.
