= Parti de l'alliance municipale (Saint-Leonard) =

Municipal political party in Montreal, Quebec, Canada

The Parti de l'alliance municipale (PAM), also known as the Alliance municipale de Saint-Léonard, was a municipal political party in the suburban community of Saint-Leonard in Montreal, Quebec, Canada in the 1970s and 1980s. The dominant party on council from 1978 to 1981, it went through a period of decline before dissolving in 1986.

PAM won seven out of twelve seats on Saint-Leonard city council in the 1978 municipal election, although PAM mayoral candidate André Chrétien was narrowly defeated by Michel Bissonnet of the Équipe du renouveau de la cité de Saint-Léonard. Bissonnet led a minority administration for three years before resigning to run for a seat in the Legislative Assembly of Quebec; he was succeeded by Antonio di Ciocco, an Équipe du renouveau member whose victory led to a realignment of municipal political alliances.

The 1982 municipal election was a disappointment for PAM. Its mayoral candidate, Rosaire Rivest, finished third against di Ciocco, and Chrétien was the party's only candidate to be returned to council. PAM did not field a candidate in a by-election that followed di Ciocco's unexpected death in 1984; Rivest and Chrétien explained that they did not want to oversee a minority administration and would instead seek to perform effectively in opposition for the next two years. In March 1986, Chrétien indicated that PAM and other opposition parties were holding discussions about a possible alliance.

PAM dissolved in 1986, and many of its leading members, including Chrétien, joined the Équipe démocratique de Saint-Léonard.
