= Peter Yeomans =

Canadian politician

Peter B. Yeomans is a retired politician in the Canadian province of Quebec. He served as mayor of the Montreal suburban community of Dorval from 1982 to 2001, was a member of the Montreal city council from 2002 to 2005, and served on the Montreal executive committee from 2002 to 2004.

== Early life and career ==
Yeomans was a director of development for Bell Canada before his election as mayor.

== Dorval City Councillor ==
Yeomans was elected as a councillor in Dorval in the 1978 municipal election, narrowly defeating incumbent Michel Rioux to win a seat in the city's east ward. He served for one four-year term.

== Mayor of Dorval ==
=== First term (1982–86) ===
Yeomans was elected to his first term as mayor in the 1982 municipal election, replacing longtime incumbent Sarto Desnoyers, who did not seek re-election.

In 1984, Yeomans championed a municipal by-law to restrict abortion clinics, strip clubs, erotica shops, and tanning studios to a remote corner of the city. Council later introduced a further, supplementary by-law to require a "buffer zone" between areas reserved for abortion clinics and areas reserved for sex shops. Several feminist groups criticized the by-law for placing access to abortion on the same level as the purchasing of pornography. Yeomans responded that the legislation was not intended to pass any judgement on the subject of abortion, but rather to ensure that any confrontations or disruptions near abortion clinics would be kept away from residential areas. The by-laws were approved by Dorval city council in January 1985 and came into effect two months later.

Yeomans also helped ensure passage of a by-law prohibiting the establishment of new commercial and retail outlets for one block on either side of the Trans-Canada Highway through Dorval. He indicated that the intent of this law was to encourage the construction of new corporate headquarters and buildings for elite and well-established firms.

He defended Dorval's only English-language high school against efforts to close it and at one stage called for the creation of a new school board to oversee all schools in Dorval.

Yeomans was a vocal defender of the Dorval International Airport throughout his time in office. During the 1980s, he strongly opposed suggestions that the airport should either close or shift some of its air traffic to the rival Mirabel International Airport. In June 1986, he led the Conference of Montreal Suburban Mayors in promoting Dorval for air passenger traffic and Mirabel for cargo traffic, and he welcomed the federal government's decision later in the same year to keep both airports open.

Montreal Urban Community

By virtue of serving as mayor of Dorval, Yeomans was an automatic member of the Montreal Urban Community (MUC), a regional governance body for the Island of Montreal. He became a member of the MUC's executive committee in 1983.

During his first term with the MUC, Yeomans was often critical of operations at the Montreal Urban Community Transit Commission (MUCTC). He contributed to a report released in May 1985 that recommended sweeping changes to West Island transport. In the same year, he supported a plan for large-scale infrastructural improvements and welcomed MUCTC chair Louise Roy's proposal of a fee increase to improve services.

Yeomans was named as vice-chair of the MUC public transit committee in December 1985. In late 1986, he argued that new revenues for transit should come from increased fees rather than a rise in taxation as proposed by newly elected Montreal mayor Jean Doré.

=== Second term (1986–90) ===
Yeomans was re-elected without opposition in the 1986 municipal election. In both 1988 and 1989, he led the Dorval city council in postponing its annual budget as a protest against the Quebec government's approach to property tax assessments. During the 1988 protest, he was quoted as describing the existing tax system as "regressive, anti-social and a disincentive to owning a home."

In June 1988, he joined with the mayors of Beaconsfield and Pointe-Claire to inaugurate a new sewage pumping plant, the function of which was to divert raw sewage from Lake Saint-Louis and contribute to the lake's eventual cleanup.

In December 1986, Yeomans added his signature to an Alliance Quebec advertisement that endorsed the use of bilingual English/French signs in Quebec and called on anglophone store owners not to post unilingual English signs. During the 1990 Oka Crisis, Yeomans welcomed Mohawk families fleeing the threat of violence at the Kahnawake reserve; he also condemned "marauding" anti-Mohawk mobs that prevented these families from docking their ships at Dorval and Lachine. The Dorval Hilton Hotel was used many times during the crisis for negotiations between indigenous protesters and representatives of the government.

Montreal Urban Community

Yeomans was promoted to chair of the MUC's public transit committee in November 1986. Shortly thereafter, he called for the province to finish delayed renovations on the Dorion–Rigaud commuter line and expressed disappointment when the government instead allocated the money for a road link to Mirabel Airport. Yeomans later opposed the provincial government's plan to extend Highway 440 to the Trans-Canada Highway, arguing that it would create more urban sprawl and reduce investment in Montreal. He did, however, strongly support the province's plans to renovate Montreal's Deux-Montagnes Line.

In June 1987, Yeomans attempted to introduce a demerit points system for Montreal Urban Community cab drivers who failed to obey a code of conduct. Several drivers complained the system unfairly targeted them, and Yeomans ultimately dropped the proposal on the grounds that it was unduly punitive. He instead oversaw the introduction of a team of cab inspectors, who were charged with ensuring drivers were properly dressed and did not reject customers without valid cause.

On January 1, 1990, Yeomans's committee introduced a new fare structure based on a system of regional zones, in which travellers from outlying areas on the Deux-Montagnes and Rigaud lines were charged higher rates.

A Montreal Gazette ran an editorial in early 1990 that was strongly critical of the public transit committee's direction under Yeomans's leadership, arguing that it had become "preoccupied with secondary matters" and was avoiding "serious examination of crucial issues" such as declining ridership.

Following the 1989 Quebec provincial election, Yeomans replaced Sam Elkas as vice-president of the Montreal Urban Community executive committee.

Union des Municipalités du Québec

Yeomans was appointed as a Montreal-area representative on the Union des Municipalités du Québec (UMQ) in 1990. In March of the same year, he used this forum to galvanize opposition among Quebec mayors to a provincial government plan to increase school taxes and shift some existing responsibilities for school, transportation, and road maintenance taxes to the municipalities.

=== Third term (1990–94) ===
Yeomans was again returned without opposition in the 1990 municipal election. In early 1992, he led Dorval council in approving property tax re-evaluations that led to significant increases for commercial and industrial property owners. He acknowledged the changes were "a bit drastic," but argued they were necessary to ensure parity with residential rates. Later in the year, amidst the backdrop of a prolonged continental recession, he announced that the city would adopt a "pay-as-you-go" approach for new projects rather than relying on loans.

In 1993, Yeomans announced that Dorval would accept the provincial government's invitation to include the city's public-sector workers within the terms of new wage-freeze legislation. The following year, he led council in approving a by-law to prohibit smoking in all public buildings.

Montreal Urban Community

The Montreal Urban Community dissolved its mass transit committee following the 1990 municipal elections, and Yeomans was instead appointed to chair a newly created economic development committee. He rejected calls for the MUC to adopt a zero-growth budget in 1991, on the grounds that such an approach would result in mass layoffs. In September 1991, the Montreal Gazette reported that Yeomans's committee was planning to support a faster approval process and longer patent protection for new prescription drugs.

Executive responsibilities were shuffled in December 1991, and Yeomans was named as chair of the MUC's public security committee. Soon after his appointment, he said that he would work to increase community involvement in crime prevention and to promote social programs that address the root causes of crime.

He announced plans to close 10 full-service MUC police stations in 1992, a decision he defended on the grounds that it would allow the force to operate more road patrols and set up more "points of service" for residents to contact the police. In the same period, he endorsed a plan to reduce staffing costs via job attrition over a period of seven years. In late 1992, he worked with police chief Alain St-Germain to reduce budgetary expenditures by cutting the amount of time officers were required to spend in court. In January 1994, he oversaw the hiring of Jacques Duchesneau to replace St-Germain as Montreal's police chief.

In 1992, the public security committee launched an investigation into the use of firearms by MUC police officers; this followed reports that police shootings had doubled in the previous year and that many of these incidents had been deemed on review to be "unjustified." In early 1993, Yeomans indicated that all officers would need to fully inform the public about the events leading to any police shooting of a civilian within 12 hours of the incident.

The most notorious police shooting in Montreal during this period was the 1991 shooting death of Marcellus François, an unarmed black man. In 1992, coroner Harvey Yarosky issued a report into François's death that condemned "the existence of a racist attitude that is totally unacceptable" within Montreal's police force. Yeomans responded by agreeing that racism should be eradicated within the force, but he also said that Yarosky had "exaggerated" the extent of the problem by presenting the image of a generally dysfunctional department. In 1994, retired judge Albert Malouf released a review of the François shooting that was also strongly critical of police conduct; Yeomans acknowledged that the report was basically fair, though he added that Malouf's criticisms should not be regarded as applicable to the force as a whole.

In 1993, Yeomans announced that the public security committee was reviewing the use of non-lethal weaponry such as pepper spray and rubber bullets. MUC police ultimately began using pepper spray in 1996, with Yeomans's approval.

Yeomans strongly opposed the provincial government's late 1992 proposal to build a casino on the Notre Dame Island, arguing that organized gambling would result in increased criminal activity. He added that municipalities would not accept the costs of policing the casino in the event that it was approved. He later opposed the provincial government's decision to take control of Quebec's video lottery terminal industry, a development he said would result in "the province sucking more money out of the local economies."

In late 1993, Yeomans indicated that his committee was considering the creation of a separate police unit to oversee the investigation of sexual assaults. He argued that change would ensure sexual assault victims would be treated with empathy by the police, as had not always occurred in the past.

He supported the Canadian government's efforts to tighten its laws concerning prostitution in 1994, saying that he especially favoured a proposal to impound cars owned by the clients of street prostitutes.

In late 1993, the Conference of Montreal Suburban Mayors met to determine its nominee to replace Michel Hamelin as MUC chair. Yeomans was nominated for the position but declined. He later voted against Vera Danyluk's selection as MUC chair, describing her as unqualified for the position.

Union des Municipalités du Québec

Yeomans continued to serve on the UMQ following the 1990 elections and was a member of its executive committee in 1991. When the provincial government introduced severe spending cuts at the beginning of a continent-wide recession in 1990, he criticized the decision as "punitive, regressive and anti-social." He later accused the provincial government of having failed to prepare for the recession, and, after a meeting with the province's assistant auditor-general in April 1991, he said that Quebec had "run out of sources of revenue."

Yeomans also called for the abolition of Quebec's department of municipal affairs in 1991, describing it as "archaic" and tasked with too many disparate responsibilities.

=== Fourth term (1994–98) ===
Yeomans was elected without opposition for a third consecutive time in the 1994 municipal election.

In February 1996, Aéroports de Montréal (ADM), the not-for-profit corporation responsible for overseeing both the Dorval and Mirabel airports, announced that it would shift its international flights from Mirabel to Dorval. Yeomans strongly supported this decision, arguing that it would both benefit his city and increase Greater Montreal's competitiveness with Toronto and other urban centers. The city of Dorval and the ADM later announced plans for a new road project to the airport, intended to reduce ground traffic congestion.

Yeomans announced in March 1996 that Dorval would privatize many of its municipal services; the Montreal Gazette noted that affected areas were to include "street cleaning and watering, cleaning of sanitary sewer systems and maintenance of bus shelters." Later in the year, however, he indicated that the plan would be scaled back to cover only sanitary sewer maintenance and snow removal in industrial zones. He remarked that the projected savings were much lower than anticipated and that city employees were in fact "very competitive with the private sector."

In April 1997, Yeomans oversaw Dorval council's approval of a symbolic resolution urging the Canadian federal government to ensure the continued existence of a united country including Quebec. In September of the same year, he helped organize a public protest against the provincial government's decision to download half a billion dollars in expenses to Quebec municipalities.

Montreal Urban Community

Yeomans was not re-appointed as chair of the public security committee after the 1994 election, relinquishing this position to Kettly Beauregard. He instead served as the committee's vice-chair and remained a member of the MUC executive. In June 1995, he indicated that the MUC police force would cancel a planned round of new hirings due to general budget cutbacks.

Yeomans supported Jacques Duchesneau's plan to introduce a community policing program for the MUC. He also sought to have Montreal transit security officers integrated into the police force, although this plan was ultimately rejected by an MUC panel.

He rejected calls for a civilian oversight body to conduct investigations into motor-vehicle accidents involving police officers, arguing that it was "not in the police's interest to cover things up" when their credibility was at stake. This statement was criticized in the local media.

Yeomans expressed skepticism about the provincial government's establishment of the Greater Montreal Development Commission in 1996, charging that the commission's membership would favour off-island municipalities. He also opposed Vera Danyluk's efforts to redefine the MUC as a "political forum" that would defend the interests of Island of Montreal communities before the provincial government, charging that this would allow the province to play Montreal, its suburbs, and the MUC off against one another. He also said that he feared Danyluk's approach would result in the MUC's municipalities becoming amalgamated into a single megacity.

=== Fifth term (1998–2001) ===
Yeomans was re-elected in the 1998 municipal election under unusual circumstances. His only opponent was Jan Eisenhardt, a 92-year-old widower who initially justified his candidacy on the grounds that he wanted Yeomans "to know the thrill of victory" rather than receiving "just another acclamation." Eisenhardt added that his bid was healthy for democracy and that he would decline to serve if elected. Yeomans tried to persuade Eisenhardt to withdraw, indicating that a contested election would cost the city at least $30,000, but Eisenhardt insisted on running. Yeomans subsequently described the election as "ridiculous and unnecessary" while the Montreal Gazette described it as "bizarre." The initially friendly nature of Eisenhardt's challenge turned to bitterness in mid-campaign, after Yeomans was alleged to have made critical remarks about his challenger's physical aptitude for the position. To no-one's surprise, Yeomans was returned without difficulty, winning with 81 per cent support.

After having reduced municipal taxes for all but one of the previous seven years, Dorval introduced a two per cent increase in 1999 while maintaining services at existing levels. In announcing this change, Yeomans commended all of the city's departments for keeping their expenses in line.

In this period, Yeomans was a vocal advocate for a high-speed rail link between downtown Montreal and the Dorval airport. He opposed suggestions that Dorval's airport should be renamed in honour of Maurice Richard following the hockey great's death in 2000.

In December 1999, the Quebec Human Rights Commission ruled that municipalities would not be permitted to start their meetings with public prayers. Yeomans refused to follow this ruling, describing the Dorval's practice of reciting a non-denominational prayer as "our God-given right to do what we want as a community."

Montreal Urban Community

Following the 1998 election, Yeomans was shifted from vice-chair of the MUC public security committee to vice-chair of the economic development committee. He was also one of three elected MUC politicians to serve on the board of Montreal International during this time. In 1999, this organization announced an agreement in principle to assume exclusive responsibility for promoting international investment in the MUC and Laval. MUC chair Vera Danyluk strongly opposed this proposal, noting that no other elected representatives from the MUC had been consulted.

Yeomans also served on the board of the Société de promotion des aéroports de Montréal, an advisory body to the ADM. He approved of the Canadian government's decision to restructure the ADM in 2001, after its previous executive had bypassed government regulators to give Bombardier Inc. permission to build a new plant on public land at Mirabel.

For most of his final term on the MUC, Yeomans's official responsibilities were overshadowed by his vocal opposition to the Quebec government's plans for municipal amalgamation on the Island of Montreal. He was strongly opposed to Montreal mayor Pierre Bourque's proposal, ultimately accepted by the provincial Parti Québécois government, to amalgamate all of the island's 29 municipalities into a single megacity. Yeomans argued that this change would undermine the distinctiveness of the island's suburban communities and would furthermore "threaten anglophone institutions, values and ways of life." When provincial municipal affairs minister Louise Harel introduced a white paper that indicated Montreal's suburban communities would lose their bilingual status in the event of amalgamation, Yeomans described the proposal as "so anti-democratic that it could be a case to go to the United Nations. He later charged that the provincial government was planning to eliminate anglophone municipalities in order to "destroy anglophone leadership so there won't be any resistance to the national question" in a future referendum on Quebec independence.

Yeomans played an active role in anti-merger protests held throughout 2000 and 2001. In late 2000, he announced that the Union of Suburban Municipalities of Montreal Island (of which he was treasurer) would establish a four-million dollar fund for an anti-amalgamation campaign, and he joined with other suburban mayors to organize a series of public rallies. Notwithstanding this opposition, the Quebec government approved its megacity legislation in December 2000, creating a single municipality for Island of Montreal. The legislation also created several borough councils in the city with the power to oversee local affairs.

Dorval and other suburban communities challenged the province's legislation before the Quebec Superior Court, which rejected their submission in June 2001. Following this, Yeomans led Dorval council in bringing the case forward to the Quebec Court of Appeal; this court also ruled against the anti-merger claimants in October 2001. In late 2001, Yeomans announced his support for a proposal sponsored by opposition Quebec Liberal leader Jean Charest that would permit municipalities to withdraw from forced amalgamations.

Yeomans approved of Dorval's participation in the Montreal Metropolitan Community, a new regional oversight body established in 2000.

== Montreal City Councillor ==
Notwithstanding his opposition to amalgamation, Yeomans chose to contest the 2001 Montreal municipal election as a candidate of Gérald Tremblay's Montreal Island Citizens Union (MICU). During the campaign, Tremblay pledged to ensure that the megacity's new boroughs would be as independent as possible. Yeomans was elected without difficulty; on election night, he said that he planned to take Dorval's challenge against amalgamation to the Supreme Court of Canada.

MICU won a council majority, and Tremblay subsequently appointed Yeomans to the Montreal executive committee with responsibility for public security and civil protection. By virtue of holding this position, he became chair of the city's public security committee. He also served as an automatic member of the Dorval–L'Île-Dorval borough council and was chosen as its first chair. All of Montreal's borough leaders were re-designated as borough mayors in December 2003.

Yeomans strongly opposed a one per cent cut mandated for all Montreal boroughs in 2002, describing Dorval–L'Île-Dorval as "a tightly operated ship with no fat to cut."

Member of the Montreal Executive Committee

Shortly after his appointment to the executive committee, Yeomans gave his support to a pilot project to permit drivers in certain Montreal boroughs to make right turns on a red light. He later indicated his support for legalizing the practice across the city. This recommendation proved very controversial, and ultimately right turns on red remained illegal.

As chair of the public security committee, Yeomans was responsible for overseeing Montreal's police and fire services. He confirmed the purchase of 4,600 new semi-automatic pistols for police officers in March 1992. (He had initially wanted the force's old weapons to be destroyed in public as a gesture to indicate they would not fall into the hands of criminals, but the city decided against this after being advised that the exercise would cost $600,000.) He introduced a new community policing plan in January 2004, highlighted by an increased focus on low-level crime and requirements for more officers to walk beats. 10 of the city's 49 stations were reduced to outposts, although none were closed.

In late 2002, Yeomans announced that the city and the province would provide $1.6 million over 10 years for new disaster gear for Montreal firefighters. He also announced the creation of a special response unit for building collapses, chemical attacks, and nuclear disasters, citing the need for increased vigilance following the terrorist attacks of September 11, 2001.

In 2003, Yeomans indicated that the Montreal would not tolerate tent cities on municipal parks. Later in the same year, he responded to accusations of racism in the Montreal police force by arguing that racial problems were not systemic and that individual instances of racism would be "dealt with severely."

In early 2004, the Montreal Gazette quoted Yeomans as saying that future police applicants who tested positive for HIV would not be hired. This policy was widely criticized as discriminatory.

Gérald Tremblay restructured his executive committee in January 2004 and assigned Yeomans as head of a new "super-ministry" in charge of quality of life and public security. In practice, his primary responsibilities do not appear to have been substantively changed. In March 2004, he announced a $100,000 initiative to assist street youth in a troubled area of Montreal's Saint Catherine Street.

Yeomans announced in April 2004 that a branch of Montreal's police force would be officially re-designated as a hate crimes unit. This did not involve any actual reorganization, as the unit had been already active on hate crimes for several months.

=== Dorval referendum and after ===
The Quebec Liberal Party won the 2003 Quebec provincial election under Jean Charest's leadership; shortly thereafter, the Charest government announced plans for consultation toward the possible de-amalgamation of Montreal's suburban communities. Yeomans welcomed the call for consultation but, despite his previously vocal opposition to the megacity, did not express an opinion on a de-merger vote. He instead commented that many aspects of the megacity, including shared services for "transit, police and, probably [...] fire protection," would be necessary for all island residents over the foreseeable future. He also remarked that the threat to Dorval's cultural identity had been significantly reduced with the defeat of the Parti Québécois government. Later in 2003, Yeomans offered his support to Mayor Tremblay's proposal to decentralize the municipal administration instead of encouraging de-mergers.

In early 2004, Yeomans openly declared himself in favour of retaining Dorval within the amalgamated megacity. He was quoted as saying, "As it relates to services and citizen-related activities, [civic administration] is very much like it was before ... we have the same provisions to provide for happy, healthy and safe communities and we have the tools to do the job." He later wrote an open letter to the Montreal Gazette in which he argued that the Tremblay administration's decentralization model had already achieved the substance of the de-amalgamation movement's original goals.

Notwithstanding Yeomans's arguments, opponents of the megacity in Dorval gathered enough signatures to call a referendum, and Dorval voters chose to become a separate municipality in a vote held in late June 2004. As a result of the vote, the borough once again became a distinct municipality on January 1, 2006. Yeomans resigned from the Montreal executive committee on July 2, 2004, saying that he could not continue to make decisions on behalf of an electorate he no longer properly represented.

Despite resigning from the executive committee, Yeomans remained as chair of the public security committee for the remainder of his term in office. In early 2005, he served on a committee that chose Yvan Delorme to succeed Michel Sarrazin as Montreal's chief of police.

Yeomans announced his retirement from municipal politics in 2005, at age 67. He supported the Dorval Action Team political party in the 2005 municipal election and helped with the party's organization, but was not a candidate for office himself.

Shortly before his term as Dorval borough mayor came to an end, Yeomans was accused of not properly informing Dorval residents that the city's water had not received fluoridation for the previous two years.

== Federal and provincial politics ==
A committed Canadian federalist, Yeomans was strongly critical of the Quebec Liberal Party's 1991 Allaire Report on increased political autonomy for Quebec. He described the report as "short-sighted, shallow, born of frustration and a horrible expression of ethnocentricity."

The Progressive Conservative Party of Canada sought to draft Yeomans as its candidate for Lachine—Lac-Saint-Louis in the 1993 Canadian federal election, but he chose not to run. When discussing the matter with reporters, he declined to indicate his political affiliation beyond confirming his support for federalism.

Yeomans strongly supported the "Non" option in Quebec's 1995 referendum on sovereignty.

In 1997, Yeomans commented that he would eventually change Dorval's street and traffic signs to conform with Quebec's Charter of the French Language but did not regard this as a priority. Three years later, when the Parti Québécois (PQ) passed a resolution urging the government of Quebec to restrict municipalities from flying the Canadian flag, Yeomans said that he would disobey any government edict to this effect.

There were rumours that the Liberal Party of Canada wanted Yeomans to run under their banner in Lac-Saint-Louis after incumbent parliamentarian Clifford Lincoln announced his retirement, but he once again ruled himself out as a candidate.

Following the 2003 provincial election, Yeomans described the outgoing Parti Québécois government as "extremely oppressive" and "racist." He later apologized for these comments.

Yeomans strongly opposed the Canadian government's decision to rename Dorval's airport after former Canadian prime minister Pierre Elliott Trudeau in 2003, charging that Trudeau's aviation policies had been harmful to Montreal's interests.

== After politics ==
In 2006, Yeomans was appointed by the Quebec government to an advisory committee on English language public schools. As of 2013, he serves on the International St. Lawrence River Board of Control, a board of Canadian and American representatives that monitors water levels on the Great Lakes and Saint Lawrence River.

The Peter B. Yeomans Cultural Centre in Dorval is named in his honour.

== Electoral record ==
2001 Montreal municipal election: City Councillor, Dorval–L'Île-Dorval
Party	Candidate	Votes	%
Citizens Union	Peter Yeomans	7,440	92.64
Vision Montreal	Len MacDonald	591	7.36
Total valid votes		8,031	–
Source: Election results, 1833-2005 (in French), City of Montreal.

1998 Dorval municipal election: Mayor of Dorval
Party	Candidate	Votes	%
-	Peter Yeomans	3,602	81.29
-	Jan Eisenhardt	829	18.71
Total valid votes		4,431	100
Source: "West Island mayors returned," Montreal Gazette, 2 November 1998, A19.

1994 Dorval municipal election: Mayor of Dorval
Party	Candidate	Votes	%
-	Peter Yeomans	acclaimed	-
Source: "Who's running where in Nov. 6 elections," Montreal Gazette, 20 October 1994, F2.

1990 Dorval municipal election: Mayor of Dorval
Party	Candidate	Votes	%
-	Peter Yeomans	acclaimed	-
Source: "West Island vote brings new faces into municipal politics," Montreal Gazette, 6 November 1990, A5.

1986 Dorval municipal election: Mayor of Dorval
Party	Candidate	Votes	%
-	Peter Yeomans	acclaimed	-
Source: Elizabeth Thompson, "Dorval mayor, councillors returned by acclamation," Montreal Gazette, 23 October 1986, I7.

1982 Dorval municipal election: Mayor of Dorval
Party	Candidate	Votes	%
Dorval Citizens Municipal Assn.	Peter Yeomans	4,430	70.30
-	Roger Blais	1,632	25.90
-	Pierre Santini	240	3.80
Total valid votes		6,302	100
Source: Montreal Gazette, 8 November 1982, A6.

1978 Dorval municipal election: City Councillor, East Ward
Party	Candidate	Votes	%
-	Peter Yeomans	elected	-
-	Michel Rioux (incumbent)	defeated	-
Sources: Rodolphe Morissette, "Quatre nouveaux maires sur l'île de Montréal," Le Devoir, 6 November 1978, pp. 1-3; Montreal Gazette, 8 November 1982, A6.
