= 1966 Montreal municipal election =

Election in Quebec, Canada

An election took place on October 23, 1966, to elect a mayor and city councillors in Montreal, Quebec, Canada. Mayor Jean Drapeau was re-elected to another four-year term in office with little opposition.

== Results (incomplete) ==
Mayor

1966 Montreal municipal election: Mayor of Montreal
| Candidate | Votes | % |
|---|---|---|
| (x)Jean Drapeau | 117,450 | 94.37 |
| Gilbert Croteau | 4,926 | 3.96 |
| Louise Parent | 2,086 | 1.68 |
| Total valid votes | 124,462 | 100 |
Source: Election results, 1833-2005 (in French), City of Montreal.

Council

1966 Montreal municipal election: Councillor, Maisonneuve, Ward One
| Candidate | Votes | % |
|---|---|---|
| (x)Pierre Lorange | accl. | . |
Source: Election results, 1833-2005 (in French), City of Montreal.

== Post-election changes ==
The municipality of Saint-Michel was annexed into Montreal on October 25, 1968. Elections for Saint-Michel's four wards were held on December 1, 1968.
