= André Chrétien =

French modern pentathlete

Personal information
- Born: 22 February 1907

Sport
- Sport: Modern pentathlon

André Chrétien (born 22 February 1907, date of death unknown) was a French modern pentathlete. He competed at the 1936 Summer Olympics.
