= Municipal Action Group =

Political party

The Municipal Action Group (MAG; French: Groupe d'action municipale) was a municipal political party that existed from 1978 to 1985 in Montreal, Quebec, Canada.

== Origins ==
The Municipal Action Group was formed in 1978 as a breakaway from the progressive Montreal Citizens' Movement (MCM), which had become the official opposition on Montreal city council in the 1974 municipal election. The MCM was initially supported by a heterogeneous community that included trade unionists, Parti Québécois and New Democratic Party supporters, and a variety of social activists. The party later became divided between its radical and centrist members, with some of the centrists forming the nucleus of the MAG. Both parties were regarded as being to the left of mayor Jean Drapeau's Civic Party, which dominated city politics in this period.

The MAG's founding members included two sitting councillors who had been elected for the MCM — Nick Auf der Maur and Bob Keaton — and Liberal Member of Parliament (MP) Serge Joyal, who was nominated as the party's candidate for mayor.

== 1978 election ==
Both the MAG and the MCM ran full candidate slates in the 1978 municipal election. The parties initially pledged to run respectful campaigns against one another, and their mayoral candidates speculated about forming a coalition government after the election. By the end of the campaign, however, relations between the parties had broken down into animosity. On election day, the split in the progressive vote resulted in a landslide victory for the Civic Party; Joyal finished a distant second in the mayoral contest, while Auf der Maur was the MAG's only candidate elected to council. The MCM also suffered a serious defeat; Michael Fainstat was the party's only successful candidate for council.

Joyal initially pledged to remain with the MAG but ultimately returned to federal politics. The MAG and MCM remained rivals on council, and in September 1982 Fainstat sued Auf der Maur for unfairly branding him as a communist. The two parties nonetheless held coalition talks prior to the 1982 municipal election, but these ended in failure.

== 1982 election ==
The Montreal Action Group again ran a full slate of candidates in the 1982 election. Drapeau was re-elected to another term in office and MCM candidate Jean Doré finished a credible second in the mayoral contest, while the MAG's Henri-Paul Vignola placed third with just over 15 per cent of the vote. The MCM won sixteen seats on council, re-establishing themselves as the official opposition. Three MAG candidates were elected: Auf der Maur, Sofoklis Rasoulis, and Sam Berliner.

== Dissolution ==
The MAG suffered a decline in party contributions after the 1982 election, and in 1984 the party was $373,777 in debt. On December 13, 1985, Sofoklis Rasoulis indicated that he would resign from the party to start a new political grouping called the Montreal Liberal Municipal Party. Auf der Maur effectively dissolved the party five days later, announcing that it would discontinue operations and that its members would sit as independents. He was quoted as saying, "We don't see the purpose of continuing the MAG. Rather than drag it out (until next year's election), we're putting it out of its misery now."
