= Montreal Citizens' Movement =

Municipal political party in Montreal

Montreal Citizens' Movement Rassemblement des citoyens et des citoyennes de Montréal
- Former municipal party
- Leader: Jean Doré
- Founded: 1973
- Dissolved: 2001
- Merged into: Union Montreal
- Ideology: Communitarianism; Social democracy Progressivism; Third Way
- Political position: Centre-left to centre
- National affiliation: New Democratic Party
- Colours: Red

The Montreal Citizens' Movement (MCM, French: Rassemblement des citoyens et des citoyennes de Montréal or RCM) was a municipal political party in Montreal, Quebec, Canada. It existed from 1973 to 2001.

== Origins ==
The Montreal Citizens' Movement was founded shortly before the 1974 municipal elections by a variety of groups: members of the Front d'Action Politique (FRAP), a left-leaning coalition of community-based action groups which had unsuccessfully run in the 1970 election; the Urban Progressive Movement (UPM), a mostly English-speaking group of community activists with links to the New Democratic Party (NDP); union activists from the Montreal Councils of the CSN and FTQ federations; and many others with backgrounds in student, community or political movements.

Amongst the founders were journalist Nick Auf der Maur, Louise Harel, later a member of the Provincial government, and other activists who were not satisfied with the management style of the administration Jean Drapeau.

While FRAP had seen itself as a radical social movement as well as a municipal political party, the MCM defined itself as a party with firm community roots.

== Opposition to Jean Drapeau ==
Eighteen of the party's candidates were elected to City Hall in 1974, constituting the first significant and effective opposition group since Drapeau became mayor more than a decade earlier. However the party was eventually plagued by internal divisions. Councillors Nick Auf der Maur and Robert Keaton founded the Municipal Action Group (French: Groupe d'Action Municipale or GAM) with a group of dissidents, which split the opposition vote. In 1978, the total elected opposition in city council consisted of Auf Der Maur for MAG and Michael Fainstat for the MCM.

The MCM was put back on the way to recovery when Jean Doré became its leader and mayoral candidate in 1982. Doré finished a strong second and fifteen of his candidates were elected. In 1984, Doré won a by-election and became the City Councillor of the district of Saint-Jean-Baptiste.

== The Doré administration and its accomplishments ==
Drapeau retired in 1986. By this time, his Civic Party was seen as tired and complacent after 26 years in power. Additionally, Drapeau didn't have a clear successor. The MCM took full advantage, and seized control of the city at the 1986 elections in a comprehensive victory. Doré was handily elected as mayor by a nearly 3-to-1 margin, while the RCM took 55 seats on council.

The MCM Executive Committee consisted of Michael Fainstat, Chairman, Robert Perreault, Vice-Chairman; John Gardiner, 42, who oversaw housing and city planning; Kathleen Verdon, who was in charge of culture, tourism and relations with cultural communities; Jacqueline Bordeleau, who was responsible for public works and fire prevention; and Lea Cousineau, who was in charge of recreation, social affairs, health and the status of women.

The party was devastated when longstanding members and sitting city councillors Pierre-Yves Melancon, Sam Boskey, Marvin Rotrand, and Pierre Goyer quit the party, accusing Doré of cozying up to powerful interests and betraying the MCM notion of reform. (They would later found the Democratic Coalition of Montreal (Coalition démocratique de Montréal). Doré had lost also much anglophone support by encouraging the enforcement of the controversial anti-English sign law Bill 178, and by renaming Dorchester Boulevard to Boulevard René-Lévesque. As well, the Overdale scandal - involving the demolition on an entire inner-city block and the expulsion of its low-income tenants - and tax hikes on businesses, as well as a poor financial climate, would erode support for the MCM.

In 1990, Doré and his team would be re-elected with a reduced majority. Four more MCM councillors quit during this sitting.

The Doré administration is credited with:

- the renewal of the Old Port and the parks and beaches of Île Sainte-Hélène
- the completion of Berri Square (Place Émilie-Gamelin), Place Charles de Gaulle and the Archaeology Museum at Pointe-à-Callière;
- the establishment of the first public commissions at City Hall;
- the adoption of Montreal's first Master Urban Plan.

Nonetheless, it faced growing criticism by fiscal conservatives for its perceived ineffective style of government, including lax policies toward city employees, as well as an unwillingness to pay down the massive debt left by the projects of former mayor Jean Drapeau. The party was also badly damaged by the Overdale fiasco.

== Decline and merger ==
By 1994, the MCM was voted out of office and held onto only 6 seats on Council. Doré, although he had won a seat on Council, decided not to sit. Internal struggles over the succession of Jean Doré undermined the party's credibility. After she won the MCM nomination for the 1998 mayoral election, City Councillor Thérèse Daviau left the party and announced that she would support Jacques Duchesneau - a former police chief and future member of the National Assembly of Quebec - for Mayor.

In 1998, MCM candidate Michel Prescott finished third with 14.4% of the vote. Only four of his candidates were elected. The party survived for a few more years. But in the wake of the province-wide Municipal Merger of 2001, the MCM was absorbed by Gérald Tremblay's organization. In July 2001, the party formally merged with the Union des citoyens et des citoyennes de l’Île de Montréal. A few months later, Tremblay was elected mayor.

== Mayoral candidates ==
Election	Mayoral Candidate	Popular Vote for Mayor	Number of Councillors
1974	Jacques Couture	39%	18/55
1978	Guy Duquette	12%	1/54
1982	Jean Doré	36%	15/57
1986	Jean Doré	68%	55/58
1990	Jean Doré	59%	41/50
1994	Jean Doré	32%	7/51
1998	Michel Prescott	14%	4/51

Victories are indicated with bold fonts.
