= Civic Party of Montreal =

Defunct municipal political party in Montreal, Quebec

Civic Party of Montreal Parti civique de Montréal
- Former municipal party
- Leader: Jean Drapeau
- Founded: 1960
- Dissolved: 1994
- Ideology: Quebecer federalism Conservatism; Populism
- Political position: Centre-right
- Colours: Green

The Civic Party of Montreal (French: Parti Civique de Montréal) was a municipal political party in Montreal, Quebec, Canada. It existed from 1960 to 1994. Throughout its history, the Civic Party was dominated by the personality of its leader Jean Drapeau.

== Origins ==
It was established in September 1960 when 17 out of the 33 Civic Action League (French: Ligue d'Action Civique or LAC) Councillors, led by Jean Drapeau, crossed the floor to create a new party.

== Achievements ==
The Civic Party won two thirds of the City Council's seats as well as the office of Mayor in 1960 and remained in power until 1986. It is credited with:

- the abolition of council seats reserved for home owners;
- the construction of the Montreal Metro system and the Place des Arts concert hall and
- the advent of Expo 67 and the 1976 Summer Olympics.

It also helped bringing Major League Baseball to Montreal with the creation of the Montreal Expos.

During the 1970s, Montreal was a virtual one-party state, with the Civic Party facing only token opposition in City Hall.

== Decline ==
In the 1980s, the party steadily lost support to the Montreal Citizens' Movement (RCM). In 1982, RCM leader Jean Doré gave Drapeau his closest competition in decades.

Drapeau's retirement in 1986 proved ominous for the party. It was increasingly seen as tired and complacent, and Drapeau had no clear successor. The 1986 municipal elections saw the Civic Party swept from power in a massive RCM landslide. Drapeau's replacement as leader, Claude Dupras, was heavily defeated in the mayoral race by Doré. The Civic Party also lost all but one of its seats on council, that of Germain Prégent.

Having spent all but a few months of its existence before 1986 as the governing party, the Civic Party was ill-prepared for opposition. Unable to get the better of the RCM, the party sank into paralysis. It was soon torn between a reformist faction led by Dupras and a traditionalist faction. Although Prégent had previously blamed Drapeau for the severe beating the party took in 1986, he identified with the traditionalist faction, and left the party to sit as an Independent by 1988 when Dupras tightened his hold on the party.

The party managed to win a by-election in 1989, which it held at the 1990 municipal election. However, its candidate for mayor, Nicole Gagnon-Larocque, only won 21 percent of the vote. It won another by-election in 1992. It regained the status of Official Opposition by merging with the Parti Municipal (Municipal Party) in July 1992. However, in 1993, it lost further ground when Jérôme Choquette left the party to form the Parti des Montréalais. Choquette had been defeated by Clément Bluteau for the party leadership.

Shortly afterward, the once-mighty party collapsed with dramatic speed. Bluteau resigned as party leader after less than a year. The party rapidly collapsed, and in 1994 its remains merged into Choquette's Parti des Montréalais, Choquette ran for Mayor in 1994 and finished third with 13% of the vote. Only two of his candidates were elected to City Hall.

== Mayoral candidates ==
Election	Mayoral candidate	Popular vote	Number of councillors
1960	Jean Drapeau	53%	44/66
1962	Jean Drapeau	88%	39/45
1966	Jean Drapeau	94%	45/48
1970	Jean Drapeau	92%	52/52
1974	Jean Drapeau	55%	37/55
1978	Jean Drapeau	61%	52/54
1982	Jean Drapeau	48%	39/57
1986	Claude Dupras	29%	1/58
1990	Nicole Gagnon-Larocque	21%	1/50

Victories are indicated with bold fonts.
