= Jean Drapeau =

Quebec politician and mayor of Montreal (1916–1999)

Jean Drapeau CC GOQ
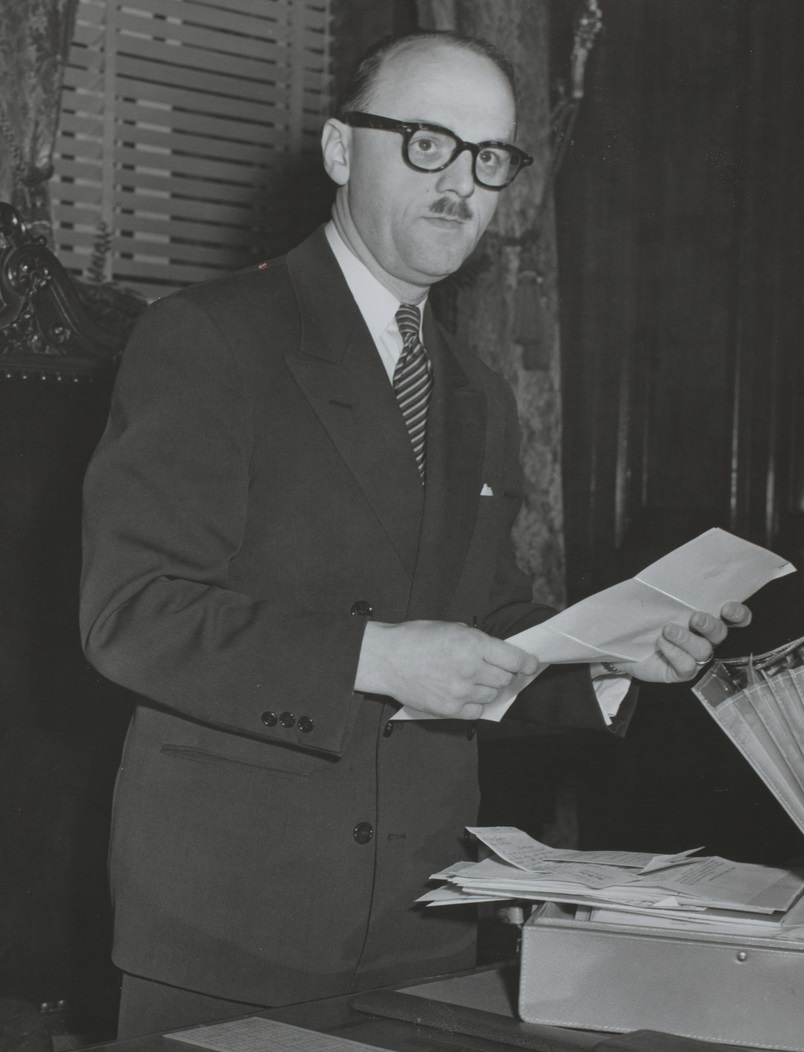
- Jean Drapeau in 1954

37th Mayor of Montreal
- In office 24 October 1960 – 9 November 1986
- Preceded by: Sarto Fournier
- Succeeded by: Jean Doré
- In office 25 October 1954 – 28 October 1957
- Preceded by: Camillien Houde
- Succeeded by: Sarto Fournier

Personal details
- Born: 18 February 1916 Montreal, Quebec, Canada
- Died: 12 August 1999 (aged 83) Montreal, Quebec, Canada
- Party: Civic Party of Montreal
- Spouse: Marie-Claire Boucher (m. 1945)
- Education: Université de Montréal
- Profession: Lawyer

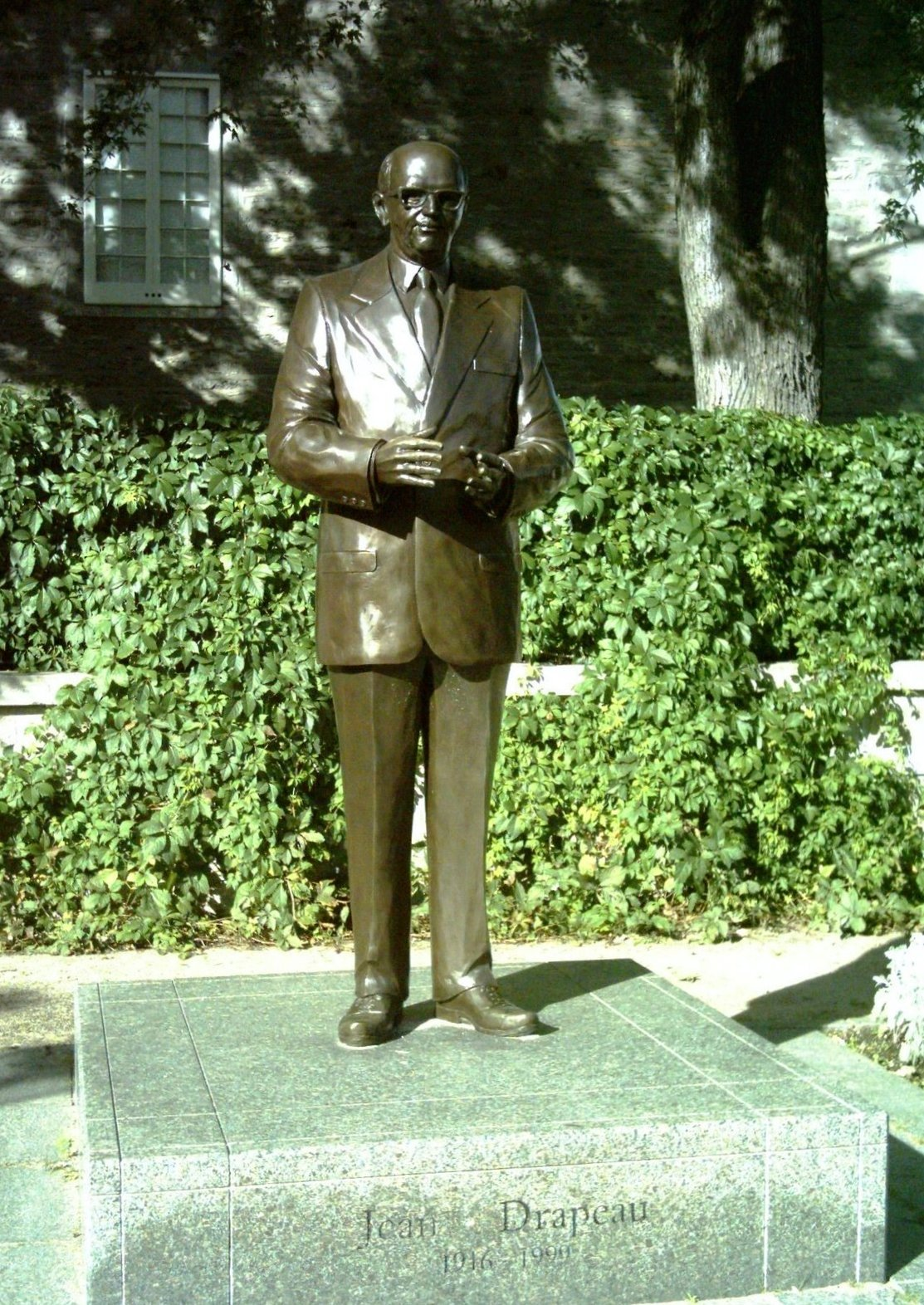
Statue of Jean Drapeau at Place Jacques-Cartier

Jean Drapeau CC GOQ (French pronunciation: [ʒɑ̃ dʁapo]; 18 February 1916 – 12 August 1999) was a Canadian politician who served as mayor of Montreal from 1954 to 1957, and again from 1960 to 1986. Major accomplishments of the Drapeau Administration include the development of the Montreal Metro subway system, the Expo 67 international exposition, and the Place des Arts performing arts centre. Drapeau also secured the hosting of the 1976 Summer Olympics and was instrumental in building the Olympic Stadium and then world's tallest inclined tower. Drapeau was responsible for securing a Major League Baseball franchise, with the creation of the Montreal Expos in 1969. Drapeau's main legacy is Montreal's attainment of global status under his administration. He was the longest-serving mayor of Montreal.

== Early life and career ==
The son of Joseph-Napoléon Drapeau and Alberta (Berthe) Martineau, Jean Drapeau was born in Montreal in 1916. His father, an insurance broker, city councillor and election worker for the Union nationale, introduced him to politics. Jean Drapeau studied law at the Université de Montréal.

Drapeau was a protégé of nationalist priest Lionel Groulx in the 1930s and 1940s, and was a member of André Laurendeau's anti-conscription Ligue pour la défense du Canada. In 1942, he ran as a candidate of the nationalist Bloc populaire, which opposed Canadian conscription during World War II, in a federal by-election. Drapeau lost the election. He was also a Bloc populaire candidate in the 1944 provincial election but was badly defeated in his Montreal constituency.

He began his practice as a criminal lawyer in Montreal in 1944. During the Asbestos strike of 1949, he took on the legal defence of some of the strikers.

In 1945, he married Marie-Claire Boucher. They had three sons.

== Mayor of Montreal ==
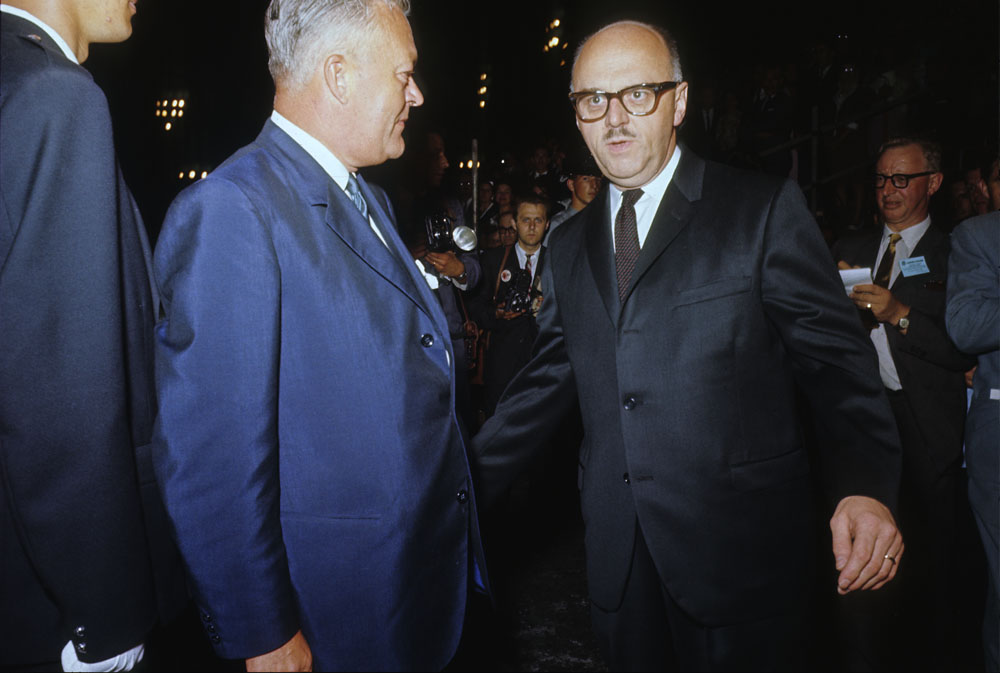
Drapeau (right) with Premier of Quebec Jean Lesage (left) in June 1964, at the ceremony to hand over the site of Expo 67

Drapeau's profile grew as the result of his role in a public inquiry led by Pacifique Plante into police corruption in the early 1950s. When Camillien Houde retired as mayor of Montreal, Drapeau was well poised to succeed him.

Drapeau was elected mayor of Montreal in 1954 at the age of 37, as the candidate of the Civic Action League, on a platform of cleaning up the administration. He ran an exceptionally wide-flung campaign, uniting a large coalition of voters from English-speaking and French-speaking parts of Montreal. Drapeau's charismatic demeanour, accessible style, and his fluency in both English and French (unprecedented for a mayoral candidate) propelled him to such popularity. In 1957, he lost to Sarto Fournier who was backed by the Premier of Quebec Maurice Duplessis, but Drapeau was elected again in the election of 1960 at the helm of his newly formed Civic Party. He was re-elected without interruption until he retired from political life in 1986. By the end of the decade, Montreal was a virtual one-party state, with Drapeau and his party only facing nominal opposition in City Hall.

During Drapeau's tenure as mayor, he initiated the construction of the Montreal Metro mass transit subway system with trains running on rubber wheels, Place des Arts, and Expo 67, the universal exposition of 1967. To support the expenditures, Drapeau created the first public lottery in Canada in 1968, which he called simply a "voluntary tax", an idea that would later gain favour and become enlarged by the provincial government by creating Loto-Québec corporation in 1970. The 1970s were busy times for the preparation of the 1976 Summer Olympics. Cost overruns and scandals forced the Quebec government to take over the project eight months before the Games opened.

Drapeau, in a highly controversial act, ordered the dismantling of Corridart, a signature art exhibition funded by the province, in "arguably the single-largest act of arts censorship in Canadian history, a desperate effort by a mayor who had lost control of his dream." Its destruction "was an illegal act, a point that would be proven in court and result in damages paid to the artists a decade later, but not by Drapeau."

Almost a year after the Games had ended, Quebec Premier René Lévesque appointed a commission to investigate the high cost overruns of the games, led by Quebec supreme court judge Albert Malouf. The inquiry found that Drapeau had made some serious and costly mistakes. The debt taken on by the city under Drapeau, coupled with a crime wave as young upstarts challenged the mafia that controlled the city's underworld, helped lead to the Murray-Hill riot, unrest caused by a wildcat strike by the Montreal police over pay on 7 October 1969. Drapeau retired ahead of the 1986 elections. Canadian Prime Minister Brian Mulroney appointed Drapeau to the position of Canadian ambassador to UNESCO in Paris.

Despite the nationalism of his youth, Drapeau remained neutral during the 1980 Quebec referendum.

In 1967, Drapeau was made a Companion of the Order of Canada and received the Royal Architectural Institute of Canada's gold medal. He was named a Grand Officer of the National Order of Quebec in 1987.

One of the biggest parks in Montreal, Parc Jean-Drapeau, composed of Notre Dame Island and Saint Helen's Island in the middle of the St. Lawrence River, site of the universal exposition of 1967, was renamed in his honour, as was the Metro station serving the park.

Drapeau was also instrumental in the demolition of the historic Van Horne Mansion on Sherbrooke street; a classic greystone house built in 1869 for John Hamilton, president of the Merchant's Bank of Montreal. The building was controversially bulldozed in the middle of the night by developer David Azrieli in 1973 under the mayoralty of Drapeau, who declared that it was impossible to preserve it for cultural reasons because it was not part of Quebec's culture - Hamilton and Van Horne being Anglophone Quebecers (Hamilton was from Ontario and Van Horne was American). It was replaced by a sixteen-storey concrete tower. The mansion's destruction sparked the creation of the heritage preservation group Save Montreal. Journalist William Weintraub includes the house and its demolition in his 1993 documentary, The Rise and Fall of English Montreal, identifying the significance of the building to the local Anglo community's heritage.

After several health concerns, Drapeau announced his retirement from politics in 1986.

== Health concerns and death ==
In July 1982, Drapeau suffered a stroke that caused paralysis to the left side of his body. In December 1985, his vertebra was fractured. After retiring in 1986, Drapeau lived a quiet life. He died in 1999 and is buried at the Notre Dame des Neiges Cemetery in Montreal.

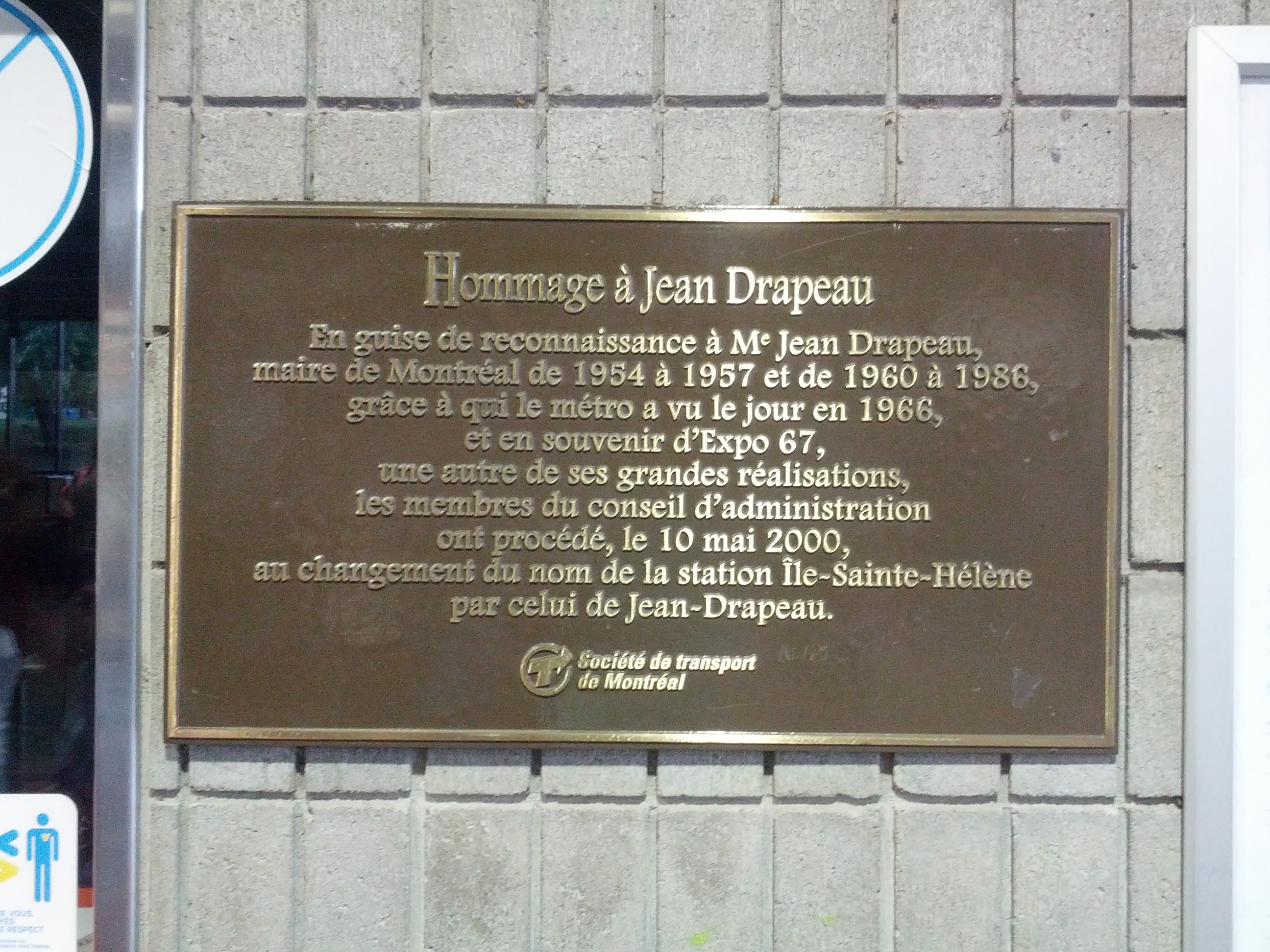
Plaque honouring Drapeau in Montreal.

== See also ==
- History of Montreal cabarets
