= List of mayors of Montreal =

This is a list of mayors of Montreal, Quebec, since the city was incorporated in 1832. Party colours do not indicate affiliation or resemblance to a provincial or a federal party.

== Mayors of Montreal ==
No.	Portrait	Name (birth – death)	Term of office	Party	Election (percent received)	Council seats	Executive Committee chair
1		Jacques Viger (1787–1858)	1833 – 1836	Independent	1833, 1834, 1835	N/A	N/A
2		Peter McGill (1789–1860)	1840–1842	Independent	1840	N/A	N/A
3		Joseph Bourret (1802–1859)	1842–1844	Independent	1842, 1843	N/A	N/A
4		James Ferrier (1800–1888)	1844–1846	Independent	1844, 1845, 1846	N/A	N/A
5		John Easton Mills (1796–1847)	1846–1847	Independent	1846, 1847	N/A	N/A
(3)		Joseph Bourret (1802–1859)	1847 – 1849	Independent	1847, 1848	N/A	N/A
6		Édouard-Raymond Fabre (1799–1854)	1849–1851	Independent	1849, 1850	N/A	N/A
7		Charles Wilson (1808–1877)	1851–1854	Independent	1851; 1852 (99%); 1853 (91%)	N/A	N/A
8		Wolfred Nelson (1791–1863)	1854–1856	Independent	1854 (51%); 1855 (unopposed)	N/A	N/A
9		Henry Starnes (1816–1896)	1856–1858	Independent	1856 (unopposed); 1857 (unopposed)	N/A	N/A
10		Charles-Séraphin Rodier (1797–1876)	1858–1862	Independent	1858 (57%); 1859 (89%); 1860 (50%); 1861 (59%)	N/A	N/A
11		Jean-Louis Beaudry (1809–1886)	1862–1866	Independent	1862 (58%); 1863 (97%); 1864 (unopposed); 1865 (57%)	N/A	N/A
(9)		Henry Starnes (1816–1896)	1866–1868	Independent	1866 (99%); 1867 (unopposed)	N/A	N/A
12		William Workman (1807–1878)	1868–1871	Independent	1868 (63%); 1869 (unopposed); 1870 (unopposed)	N/A	N/A
13		Charles-Joseph Coursol (1819–1888)	1871–1873	Independent	1871 (unopposed); 1872 (unopposed)	N/A	N/A
14		Francis Cassidy (1827–1873)	1873	Independent	1873 (unopposed)	N/A	N/A
15		Aldis Bernard (1810–1876)	1873–1875	Independent	1874 (84%)	N/A	N/A
16		William Hales Hingston (1829–1907)	1875–1877	Independent	1875 (88%); 1876 (unopposed)	N/A	N/A
(11)		Jean-Louis Beaudry (1809–1886)	1877–1879	Independent	1877 (77%); 1878 (unopposed)	N/A	N/A
17		Sévère Rivard (1834–1888)	1879–1881	Independent	1879 (53%); 1880 (unopposed)	N/A	N/A
(11)		Jean-Louis Beaudry (1809–1886)	1881–1885	Independent	1881 (52%); 1882 (58%); 1883 (52%); 1884 (53%)	N/A	N/A
18		Honoré Beaugrand (1848–1906)	1885–1887	Independent	1885 (53%); 1886 (62%)	N/A	N/A
19		John Abbott (1821–1893)	1887 – 1888	Independent	1887 (55%); 1888 (unopposed)	N/A	N/A
20		Jacques Grenier (1823–1909)	1889–1891	Independent	1889 (unopposed); 1890 (unopposed)	N/A	N/A
21		James McShane (1833–1918)	1891–1893	Independent	1891 (67%); 1892 (unopposed)	N/A	N/A
22		Alphonse Desjardins (1841–1912)	1893–1894	Independent	1893 (50%)	N/A	N/A
23		Joseph-Octave Villeneuve (1836–1901)	1894–1896	Independent	1894 (50%)	N/A	N/A
24		Richard Wilson-Smith (1852–1912)	1896–1898	Independent	1896 (unopposed)	N/A	N/A
25		Raymond Préfontaine (1850–1905)	1898–1902	Independent	1898 (unopposed); 1900 (67%)	N/A	N/A
26		James Cochrane (1852–1905)	1902–1904	Independent	1902 (52%)	N/A	N/A
27		Hormidas Laporte (1850–1934)	1904–1906	Independent	1904 (71%)	N/A	N/A
28		Henry Archer Ekers (1855–1937)	1906–1908	Independent	1906 (56%)	N/A	N/A
29		Louis Payette (1854–1932)	1908–1910	Independent	1908 (55%)	N/A	N/A
30		James John Edmund Guerin (1856–1932)	1910–1912	Independent	1910 (64%)	N/A	N/A
31		Louis-Arsène Lavallée (1861–1936)	1912–1914	Independent	1912 (63%)	N/A	N/A
32		Médéric Martin (1869–1946)	1914–1924	Independent	1914 (54%); 1916 (45%); 1918 (55%)	N/A	N/A
32		Médéric Martin (1869–1946)	1914–1924	Independent	1921 (71%)	N/A	Joseph-Adélard Brodeur (?−1927)
33		Charles Duquette (1869–1937)	1924–1928	Independent	1924 (51%)	N/A	Joseph-Adélard Brodeur (?−1927)
(32)		Médéric Martin (1869–1946)	1926–1928	Independent	1926 (56%)	N/A	Joseph-Adélard Brodeur (?−1927)
(32)		Médéric Martin (1869–1946)	1926–1928	Independent	1926 (56%)	N/A	Alphonse-Avila Desroches (1927–?)
34		Camillien Houde (1889–1958)	1928–1932	Independent	1928 (61%)	N/A	Alphonse-Avila Desroches (1927–?)
34		Camillien Houde (1889–1958)	1928–1932	Independent	1930 (67%)	N/A	Tancrède Fortin
35		Fernand Rinfret (1883–1939)	1932–1934	Independent	1932 (51%)	N/A	Joseph-Maurice Gabias
(34)		Camillien Houde (1889–1958)	1934–1936	Independent	1934 (63%)	N/A	Joseph-Marie Savignac
36		Adhémar Raynault (1881–1984)	1936–1938	Independent	1936 (44%)	N/A	Ovide Taillefer
(34)		Camillien Houde (1889–1958)	1938–1940	Independent	1938 (56%)	N/A	Joseph-Marie Savignac
(36)		Adhémar Raynault (1881–1984)	1940–1944	Independent	1940 (25%); 1942 (60%)	N/A	J.-Omer Asselin
(34)		Camillien Houde (1889–1958)	1944–1954	Independent	1944 (57%); 1947 (unopposed); 1950 (67%)	N/A	J.-Omer Asselin
37		Jean Drapeau (1916–1999)	1954–1957	Ligue d'action civique	1954 (50%)	28/99	Pierre DesMarais
38		Sarto Fournier (1908–1980)	1957–1960	Independent	1957 (51%)	N/A	Joseph-Marie Savignac
(37)		Jean Drapeau (1916–1999)	1960–1986	Civic Party	1960 (53%); 1962 (88%); 1966 (94%)	44/66; 39/45; 45/48	Lucien Saulnier
(37)		Jean Drapeau (1916–1999)	1960–1986	Civic Party	1970 (92%); 1974 (55%)	52/52; 37/55	Gérard Niding
(37)		Jean Drapeau (1916–1999)	1960–1986	Civic Party	1978 (61%); 1982 (48%)	52/54; 40/58	Yvon Lamarre
39		Jean Doré (1944–2015)	1986–1994	Montreal Citizens' Movement	1986 (68%)	56/59	Michael Fainstat
39		Jean Doré (1944–2015)	1986–1994	Montreal Citizens' Movement	1990 (59%)	42/51	Léa Cousineau
40		Pierre Bourque (born 1942)	1994–2001	Vision Montréal	1994 (47%)	39/52	Noushig Eloyan
40		Pierre Bourque (born 1942)	1994–2001	Vision Montréal	1998 (44%)	40/52	Jean Fortier
41		Gérald Tremblay (born 1942)	2001 – 5 November 2012	Union Montréal	2001 (49%); 2005 (54%)	42/74; 48/65	Frank Zampino (2001–2008); Claude Dauphin (2008–2009)
41		Gérald Tremblay (born 1942)	2001 – 5 November 2012	Union Montréal	2009 (37%)	39/65	Gérald Tremblay (2009–2011); Michael Applebaum (2011–2012)
42		Michael Applebaum (born 1963)	19 November 2012 – 18 June 2013	Independent	–	–	Laurent Blanchard
43		Laurent Blanchard (born 1952)	25 June 2013 – 14 November 2013	Independent	–	–	Josée Duplessis
44		Denis Coderre (born 1963)	14 November 2013 – 16 November 2017	Équipe Denis Coderre	2013 (32%)	27/65	Pierre Desrochers
45		Valérie Plante (born 1974)	16 November 2017 – 13 November 2025	Projet Montréal	2017 (51%)	34/65	Benoit Dorais (2017–2021)
45		Valérie Plante (born 1974)	16 November 2017 – 13 November 2025	Projet Montréal	2021 (52%)	37/65	Dominique Ollivier (2021–2023); Luc Rabouin (2023–2024); Émilie Thuillier (2024–2025)
46		Soraya Martinez Ferrada (born 1972)	13 November 2025 – current	Ensemble Montréal	2025 (43%)	34/65	Claude Pinard

Applebaum is the most recent non-francophone mayor, the last being James John Edmund Guerin in 1912. Applebaum is the first Jewish mayor for the city with previous holders either French Canadian, Scottish, Irish or English descent.

== See also ==
- Mayor of Montreal
- List of leaders of the Official Opposition (Montreal)
- Montreal City Council
- Timeline of Montreal history
- History of Montreal
- History of Quebec
- List of governors of Montreal
