= List of Roman Catholic archbishops of Montreal =

Archbishop of Montreal
- Archbishopric

catholic
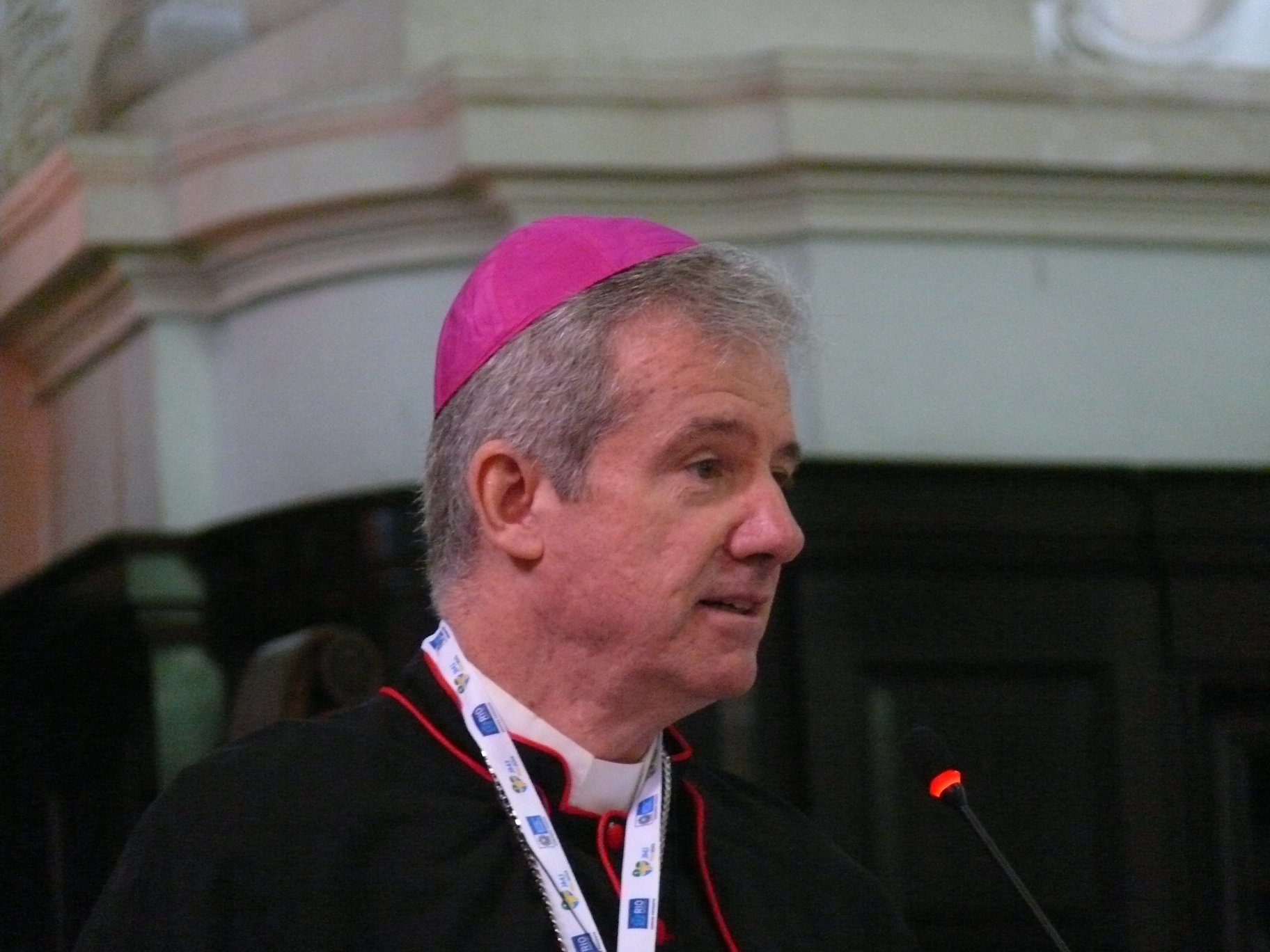
- Incumbent; Christian Lépine

Information
- First holder: Jean-Jacques Lartigue (bishop); Édouard-Charles Fabre (archbishop)
- Established: 1836 (bishopric); 1886 (archbishopric)
- Archdiocese: Montreal
- Cathedral: Mary, Queen of the World Cathedral

Website
- https://www.diocesemontreal.org/en

The archbishop of Montreal is the head of the Roman Catholic Archdiocese of Montreal, responsible for looking after its spiritual and administrative needs. This archdiocese is the metropolitan see of the ecclesiastical province encompassing the south-central part of the Canadian province of Quebec, which includes the suffragan dioceses of Joliette, Saint-Jean–Longueuil, Saint-Jérôme–Mont-Laurier, and Valleyfield. The current archbishop is Christian Lépine.

The archdiocese began as the Diocese of Montreal, which was established on May 13, 1836. Jean-Jacques Lartigue was appointed its first bishop without prior approval from the British government. Consequently, this set the precedent under which the colonial authorities in Canada began to curtail their interference in the internal matters of the Church, such as the appointment of bishops and the creation of new dioceses. On June 8, 1886, the diocese was elevated to the status of archdiocese by Pope Leo XIII Édouard-Charles Fabre became the first archbishop of the newly formed metropolitan see.

Eight men have been Archbishop of Montreal; another two were bishop of its predecessor diocese. Of these, two were members of the Society of the Priests of Saint Sulpice (PSS). Three archbishops – Paul-Émile Léger, Paul Grégoire, and Jean-Claude Turcotte – were elevated to the College of Cardinals. Lartigue, the first ordinary of the archdiocese, was also the first of seven bishops and archbishops of Montreal who were born in the city. (Note: The other six bishops and archbishops born in Montreal are Fabre, Bruchési, Gauthier, Grégoire, Turcotte, and Lépine.) Paul Bruchési had the longest tenure as Archbishop of Montreal, serving for 42 years (1897–1939), while his immediate successor Georges Gauthier held the position for eleven months (1939–1940), marking the shortest episcopacy.

== List of ordinaries ==
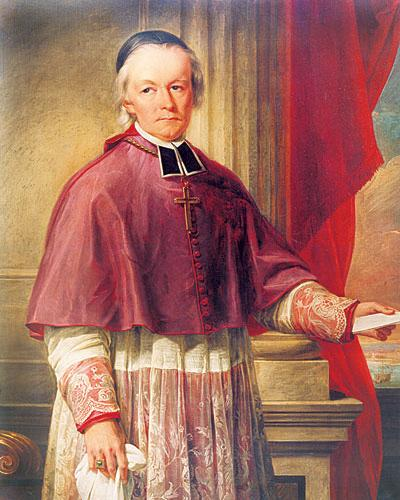
Jean-Jacques Lartigue was the first bishop of Montreal, serving from 1836 to 1840.

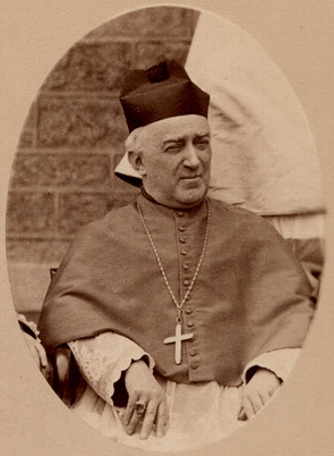
Édouard-Charles Fabre was the last bishop of Montreal and its first archbishop.

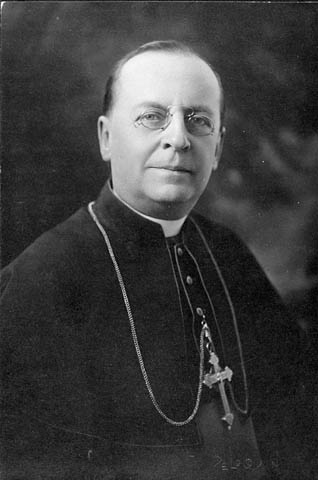
Paul Bruchési was Archbishop of Montreal for 42 years, serving from 1897 until his death in 1939.

Key
‡	Elevated to the College of Cardinals
PSS	Society of the Priests of Saint Sulpice

=== Bishops of Montreal ===
Bishops
From	Until	Incumbent	Notes	Ref(s)
1836	1840	Jean-Jacques Lartigue, PSS	Appointed on May 13, 1836. Died on April 19, 1840.	
1840	1876	Ignace Bourget	Coadjutor bishop (Note: Under the Code of Canon Law, the coadjutor bishop has the right of succession (cum jure successionis) upon the death, retirement or resignation of the diocesan bishop he is assisting.) from 1837 to 1840. Resigned on May 15, 1876. Died on June 8, 1885.	
1876	1886	Édouard-Charles Fabre	Coadjutor bishop from 1873 to 1876.	

=== Archbishops of Montreal ===
Archbishops
From	Until	Incumbent	Notes	Ref(s)
1886	1896	Édouard-Charles Fabre	Became the first Archbishop of Montreal on June 8, 1886. Died on December 30, 1896.	
1897	1939	Paul Bruchési	Appointed on June 25, 1897. Died on September 20, 1939.	
1939	1940	Georges Gauthier	Auxiliary bishop from 1912 to 1921. Apostolic administrator from 1921 to 1923. Coadjutor archbishop from 1923 to 1939. Died on August 31, 1940.	
1940	1950	Joseph Charbonneau	Coadjutor archbishop from May 1940 to August 1940. Resigned on February 9, 1950. Died on November 19, 1959.	
1950	1968	Paul-Émile Léger, PSS^{‡}	Appointed on March 25, 1950. Elevated to cardinal on January 12, 1953. Resigned on April 20, 1968. Died on November 13, 1991.	
1968	1990	Paul Grégoire^{‡}	Auxiliary bishop from 1961 to 1968. Elevated to cardinal on June 28, 1988. Retired on March 17, 1990, after reaching the mandatory retirement age of 75. Died on October 30, 1993.	
1990	2012	Jean-Claude Turcotte^{‡}	Auxiliary bishop from 1982 to 1990. Elevated to cardinal on November 26, 1994. Retired on March 20, 2012, after reaching the mandatory retirement age of 75. Died on April 8, 2015.	
2012	present	Christian Lépine	Auxiliary bishop from 2011 to 2012.	
