= Drapeau =

Drapeau is a French surname meaning flag. Notable people with the surname include:

- Étienne Drapeau (born 1978), retired Canadian ice hockey player
- Jean Drapeau, CC, GOQ (1916–1999), Canadian lawyer and politician who served as mayor of Montreal
- Joseph Drapeau (1752–1810), seigneur, merchant and political figure in Lower Canada
- Joseph-Napoléon Drapeau, Canadian politician
- Scott Drapeau (born 1972), American basketball player

== See also ==
- Jean-Drapeau (Montreal Metro), station on the Yellow Line of the Montreal Metro rapid transit system
- Le drapeau belge, recitation with orchestral accompaniment written by the English composer Edward Elgar in 1917
- Parc Jean-Drapeau, Montreal, Quebec, Canada, in the Saint Lawrence River
