= George Gauthier =

George Gauthier may refer to:

- George Gauthier (American football) (1890–1964), athlete at Michigan State University, coach at Michigan State and Ohio Wesleyan University
- Georges Gauthier (1871–1940), French Canadian Archbishop of Montreal and the first rector of the Université de Montréal
- George E. Gauthier (1911–1983), Canadian civil servant
