= Montreal Metropolitan Commission =

Former Canadian municipal authority

The Montreal Metropolitan Commission (known in French as the Commission métropolitaine de Montréal) was an authority that was involved in municipal affairs affecting the urbanized part of the Island of Montreal.

== History ==
When four municipalities (Montreal North, Saint-Michel, Pointe-aux-Trembles, and Laval-de-Montréal) were approaching bankruptcy, they requested annexation by the City of Montreal. Montreal, then experiencing a budgetary crisis arising from its annexation of Maisonneuve in 1918, refused to consider this request, unless it annexed the more wealthy municipalities on the Island of Montreal at the same time. As a compromise, the Quebec government established the Island of Montreal Metropolitan Commission in 1921, which was renamed as the Montreal Metropolitan Commission in the following year. The territory over which the Commission had jurisdiction was known as the Metropolitan District.

The Commission existed until 1959, when it was replaced by the Montreal Metropolitan Corporation (in French, Corporation du Montréal métropolitain), which was abolished in 1969 on the creation of the Montreal Urban Community.

== Composition ==
The Commission consisted of 15 members appointed from the following bodies:

Municipality		Number
Montreal	Councillors	7
Montreal	City Controller	1
Westmount		1
Outremont		1
Verdun		1
Lachine		1
LaSalle, Saint-Pierre, Hampstead, Mount Royal, Saint-Laurent, and Montreal West		1
Montreal North, Saint-Michel, Montreal East, Pointe-aux-Trembles, and Laval-de-Montréal		1
Provincial Department of Municipal Affairs (non-voting)		1
Total		15

The following served as chairman of the Commission during its existence:

Years	Chairman
1921–1927	Joseph-Adélard-Azarie Brodeur
1927–1932	Joseph-Maurice Gabias
1932–1934	Dr Henri-Adonai Quintal
1934–1938	Winchester Henry Biggar
1938–1941	Joseph-Georges Caron
1941–1954	Joseph-Omer Asselin
1954–1957	Pierre DesMarais
1958–1959	Maurice Forget

== Functions ==
Except for the City of Montreal, no member municipality could issue bonds or contract non-temporary loans without the Commission's approval. Any municipality failing to meet its obligations could have its financial affairs taken over by the Commission, and all solvent municipalities were liable for the interest of the debts of the insolvent municipalities. In 1953, the Commission's powers were enlarged to include expropriation.

== Extraterritorial jurisdiction of the City of Montreal ==
In 1935, the City of Montreal acquired the power to impose sales tax and income tax in the City as well as in the other municipalities under the control of the Commission, and bylaws came into effect on 1 May 1935 for:

- a 2% sales tax on all sales taking place in the specified territory, or on goods being delivered to a person who resides or has a place of business in it, which was the first retail sales tax to be imposed in Canada.
- income tax on every individual having his residence, domicile, or place of business in the specified territory, which was set at 20% of the individual's liability for federal income tax for the previous taxation year.

The amounts raised (net of administrative costs) were shared pro rata with the other municipalities within the Commission's territory.

The imposition of sales tax would continue until 1964 (when the province would take over the field), and the municipal income tax would be abolished with the implementation of the Wartime Tax Rental Agreements of 1941.
