= Saint-Édouard-de-Fabre =

- Parish municipality
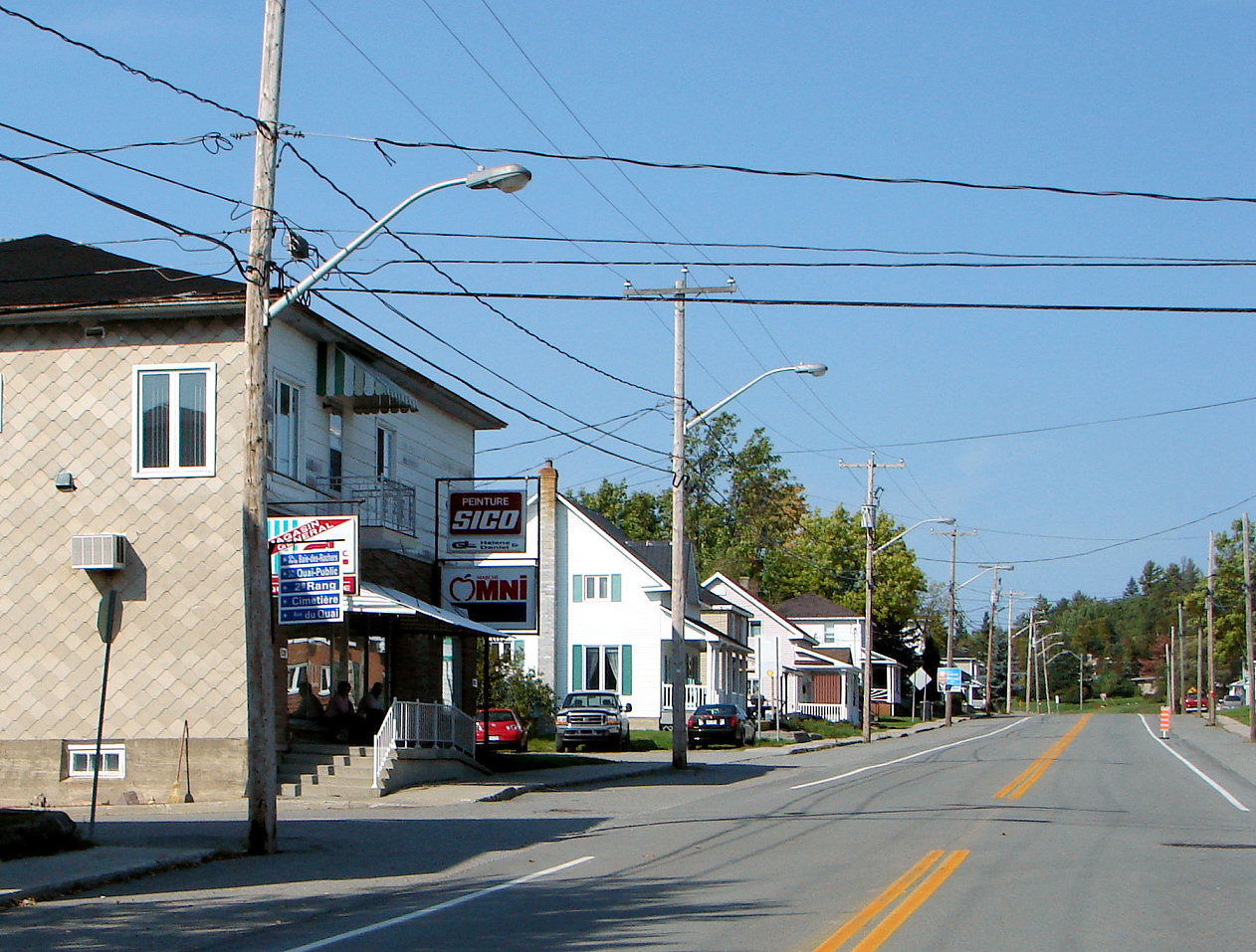
- Downtown of Saint-Édouard-de-Fabre

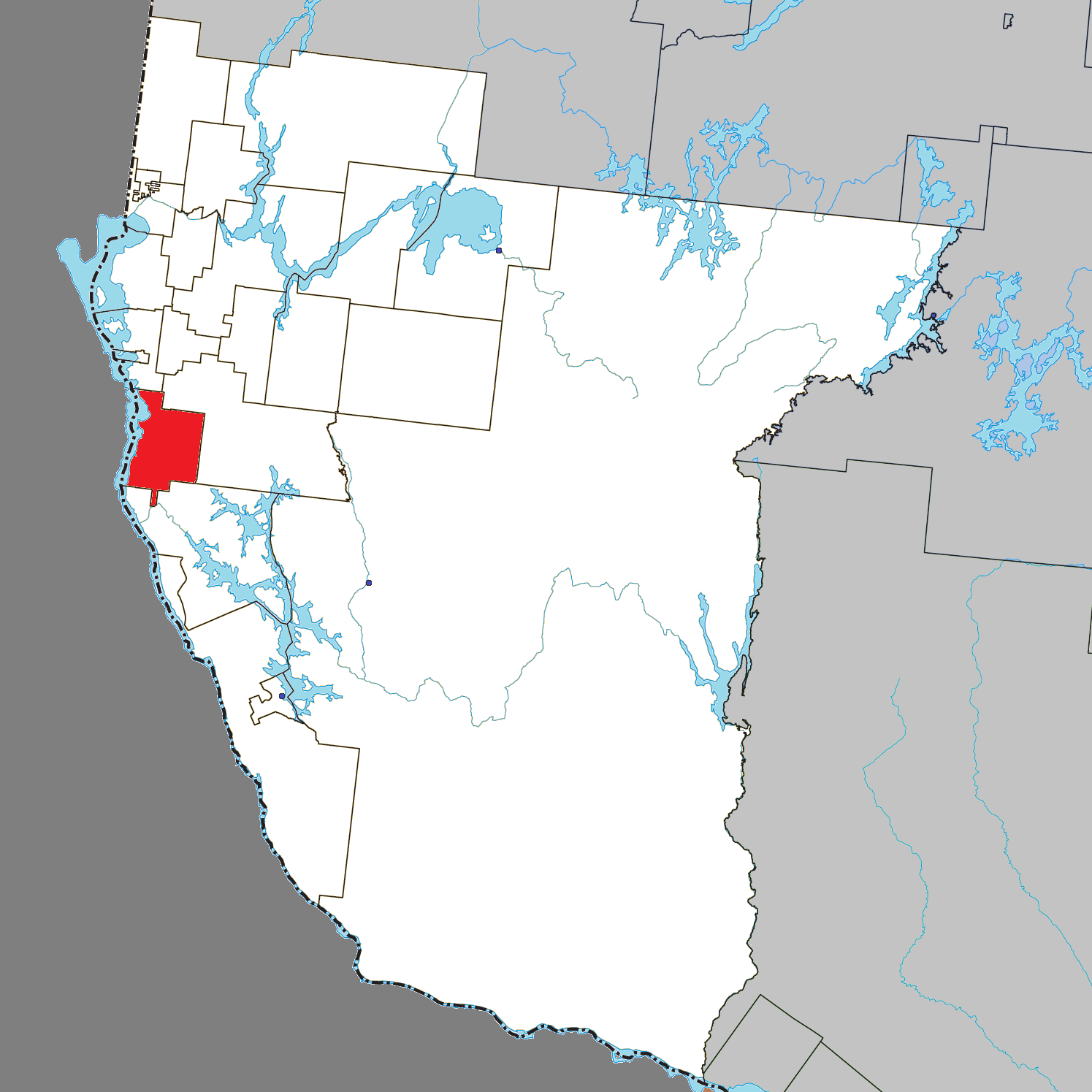
- Location within Témiscamingue RCM

- Location in western Quebec
- Coordinates: 47°12′N 79°22′W
- Country: Canada
- Province: Quebec
- Region: Abitibi-Témiscamingue
- RCM: Témiscamingue
- Settled: 1870
- Constituted: October 3, 1912

Government
  - Mayor: Mario Drouin
  - Federal riding: Abitibi—Témiscamingue
  - Prov. riding: Rouyn-Noranda–Témiscamingue

Area
  - Total: 216.86 km^{2} (83.73 sq mi)
  - Land: 190.29 km^{2} (73.47 sq mi)

Population (2021)
  - Total: 671
  - Density: 3.5/km^{2} (9.1/sq mi)
  - Pop (2016–21): ▲6.8%
  - Dwellings: 320
- Time zone: UTC−5 (EST)
  - Summer (DST): UTC−4 (EDT)
- Postal code(s): J0Z 1Z0
- Area code: 819
- Website: municipalites-du-quebec.ca/st-edouard-de-fabre/

Saint-Édouard-de-Fabre (French pronunciation: [sɛ̃t‿edwaʁ də fabʁ]) is a parish municipality in western Quebec, Canada, in the Témiscamingue Regional County Municipality.

It is named after Édouard-Charles Fabre.

In addition to the main namesake population centre, the municipality also includes the hamlet of Fabre-Station and the community of Pointe-Martel.

== History ==
In the 17th century, a fur trading post was established on the eastern shore of Lake Temiskaming, 18 kilometres (11 mi) south of Ville-Marie. It was an important French-Canadian post, operating for almost two centuries.

In 1870, the first settler arrived there and cleared the first land for agriculture in the Témiscamingue region. At the end of that century, mining prospectors arrived and discovered copper, cobalt, nickel, and silver deposits, resulting in a brief mining boom (that ended in 1904 when larger deposits were found in Cobalt, Ontario).

In 1899, the parish of Saint-Édouard was founded, named after Édouard-Charles Fabre. In 1904, the Township Municipality of Fabre was established, which was dissolved in 1912, when it was divided into the Parish Municipalities of Saint-Édouard-de-Fabre and Saint-Placide.

== Demographics ==
In the 2021 Census of Population conducted by Statistics Canada, Saint-Édouard-de-Fabre had a population of 671 living in 287 of its 320 total private dwellings, a change of 6.8% from its 2016 population of 628. With a land area of 190.29 km^{2} (73.47 sq mi), it had a population density of 3.5/km^{2} (9.1/sq mi) in 2021.

Canada census – Saint-Édouard-de-Fabre community profile

| | 2021 | 2016 | 2011 |
| Population | 671 (+6.8% from 2016) | 628 (-3.2% from 2011) | 649 (-7.4% from 2006) |
| Land area | 190.29 km^{2} (73.47 sq mi) | 191.91 km^{2} (74.10 sq mi) | 192.25 km^{2} (74.23 sq mi) |
| Population density | 3.5/km^{2} (9.1/sq mi) | 3.3/km^{2} (8.5/sq mi) | 3.4/km^{2} (8.8/sq mi) |
| Median age | 44.0 (M: 42.0, F: 46.4) | 44.4 (M: 43.0, F: 45.5) | 41.9 (M: 40.9, F: 43.8) |
| Private dwellings | 320 (total) 287 (occupied) | 306 (total) 266 (occupied) | 305 (total) 261 (occupied) |
| Median household income | $75,500 | $63,744 | $60,247 |

References: 2021 2016 2011

Historical census populations – Saint-Édouard-de-Fabre

| Year | Pop. | ±% |
|---|---|---|
| 1911 | 653 | — |
| 1921 | 912 | +39.7% |
| 1931 | 976 | +7.0% |
| 1941 | 1,006 | +3.1% |
| 1951 | 1,185 | +17.8% |
| 1956 | 1,253 | +5.7% |
| 1961 | 1,066 | −14.9% |

| Year | Pop. | ±% |
|---|---|---|
| 1966 | 962 | −9.8% |
| 1971 | 783 | −18.6% |
| 1976 | 709 | −9.5% |
| 1981 | 758 | +6.9% |
| 1986 | 750 | −1.1% |
| 1991 | 728 | −2.9% |
| 1996 | 734 | +0.8% |

| Year | Pop. | ±% |
|---|---|---|
| 2001 | 675 | −8.0% |
| 2006 | 701 | +3.9% |
| 2011 | 649 | −7.4% |
| 2016 | 628 | −3.2% |
| 2021 | 671 | +6.8% |

Population counts are not adjusted for boundary changes.
Source: Statistics Canada

Mother tongue (2021):

- English as first language: 2.2%
- French as first language: 97.0%
- English and French as first language: 0%
- Other as first language: 1.5%

== Government ==
List of former mayors:

- Serge Marcil (...–2009?)
- Réjean Drouin (2009?–2011)
- Claudine Laforge Clouâtre (2011–2013)
- Mario Drouin (2013–present)

== See also ==
- List of parish municipalities in Quebec
