= Joseph-Olier Renaud Jr. =

Canadian politician

Joseph-Olier Renaud

Member of the Legislative Council of Quebec for Alma
- In office 1946–1968
- Appointed by: Maurice Duplessis
- Preceded by: Médéric Martin
- Succeeded by: Abolished on December 31, 1968

Personal details
- Born: 3 October 1908 Saint-Léonard-de-Port-Maurice, Quebec
- Died: 3 March 1991 (aged 82) Outremont, Quebec
- Party: Union Nationale

Joseph-Olier Renaud, KC (3 October 1908 – 3 March 1991) was a Canadian politician.

Born in Saint-Léonard-de-Port-Maurice, Quebec, the son of Joseph-Olier Renaud Sr., Renaud studied at the Université de Montréal and was admitted to the Quebec Bar in 1932. He was created a King's Counsel in 1946. He practised law in Montreal before becoming a Crown Prosecutor from 1937 to 1939 and a Special Prosecutor of the Sûreté du Québec in 1939. From 1938 to 1946, he was a Judge for the City of Pointe-aux-Trembles. A founding member of the Union Nationale, he was appointed to the Legislative Council of Quebec for Alma in 1946 and served until the abolition of the Council in 1968.
