= Une voix dans le désert =

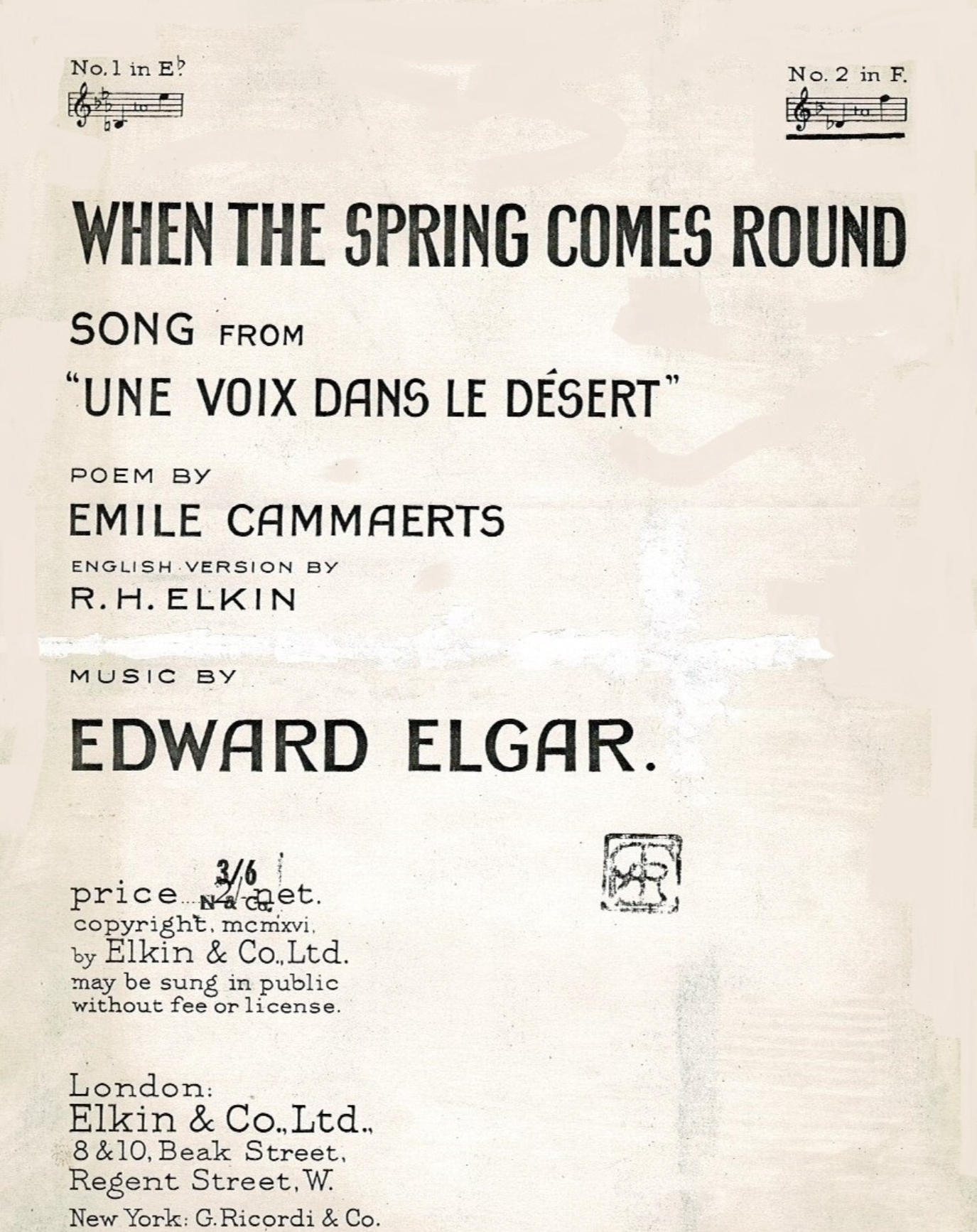
A Voice in the Desert, recited with music by Edward Elgar

Une voix dans le désert ("A Voice in the Desert") is a recitation, with a soprano soloist and orchestra, written by the English composer Edward Elgar in 1915 as his Op. 77. The French words are by the Belgian poet Émile Cammaerts.

It was first produced, in London at the Shaftesbury Theatre, on 29 January 1916, with the recitation by the Belgian dramatic performer Carlo Liten, the soprano Olga Lynn, and an orchestra conducted by the composer.

The words were translated into English by Cammaerts' wife, Tita Brand.

The work was published as a piano reduction (the vocal parts with piano accompaniment) by Elkin & Co. in 1916.

== Synopsis ==
The reality of the First World War was horrific. In August 1914 Belgium had been invaded by the German army: the big cities had been destroyed, the carnage on both sides was incalculable, and King Albert and his army were driven to the banks of the river Yser in West Flanders.

The Pall Mall Gazette in review of Une voix dans le désert described the scene on stage:

It is night when the curtain rises, showing the battered dwelling, standing alone in the desolate land, with the twinkling of camp fires along the Yser in the distance, and in the foreground the cloaked figure of a man, who soliloquises on the spectacle to Elgar's music. Then he ceases, and the voice of a peasant girl is heard coming from the cottage, singing a song of hope and trust in anticipation of the day the war shall be ended [ "Quand nos bourgeons se rouvriront" ("When the spring comes round again") ] ... The wayfarer stands transfixed as he listens to the girl's brave song, and then, as he comments again on her splendid courage and unconquerable soul, the curtain slowly falls.

== Lyrics ==
English translation A Voice in the Desert A hundred yards from the trenches, Close to the battle-front, There stands a little house, Lonely and desolate. Not a man, not a bird, not a dog, not a cat, Only a flight of crows along the railway line, The sound of our boots on the muddy road And, along the Yser, the twinkling fires. A low thatched cottage With doors and shutters closed, The roof torn by a shell, Standing out of the floods alone ... Not a cry, not a sound, not a life, not a mouse, Only the stillness of the great graveyards, Only the crosses – the crooked wooden crosses – On the wide lonely plain. A cottage showing grey Against a cold black sky, Blind and deaf in the breeze Of the dying day, And the sound of our footsteps slipping On the stones as we go by ... Suddenly, on the silent air, Warm and clear, pure and sweet, As sunshine on the golden moss, Strong and tender, loud and clear, As a prayer, Through the roof a girl's voice rang, And the cottage sang! Soprano solo When the spring comes round again, Willows red and tassels grey When the spring comes round again, Our cows will greet the day, They'll sound their horn triumphant, White sap and greening spear Sound it so loud and long, Until the dead once more shall hear. We shall hear our anvils, Strong arm and naked breast And in our peaceful meadows, The scythe will never rest. Ev'ry church will ope its door, Antwerp, Ypres and Nieuport, The bells will then be ringing, The foe's death knell be ringing. The shall sound spade and shovel, Diksmuide and Ramscapelle And gaily gleam the trowel, While through the air the pick is swinging. From the ports our boats will glide. Anchor up and mooring slipt The lark on high will be soaring Above our rivers wide. And then our graves will flower, Heart'sease and golden rod And then our graves will flower Beneath the peace of God. Not a breath, not a sound, not a soul, Only the crosses, the crooked wooden crosses ... "Come, it is getting late 'Tis but a peasant girl With her father living there . . . . They will not go away, nothing will make them yield, They will die, they say, Sooner than leave their field." Not a breath, not a life, not a soul, Only a flight of crows along the railway line, The sound of our boots on the muddy road ... And along the Yser the twinkling of the fires.	Français Une voix dans le désert C'était sur le front, A cent pas des tranchées, Une petite maison Morne et désolée. Pas un homme, pas une poule, pas un chien, pas un chat, Rien qu'un vol de corbeaux le long du chemin de fer, Le bruit de nos bottes sur le pavé gras, Et la ligne des feux clignotant sur l'Yser. Une chaumine restée là, Porte fermée et volets clos, Un trou d'obus dans le toit, Plantée dans l'eau comme ... un flot. Pas un cri, pas un bruit, pas une vie, pas un chat, Rien que le silence des grands cimetières Et le signe monotone des croix, des croix de bois, Par la plaine solitaire. Une chaumine toute grise Sur le ciel noir, Aveugle et sourde dans la brise Du soir, Et le bruit amorti de nos pas Glissant sur le pavé gras ... Puis, tout à coup, Chaude, grave et douce, Comme le soleil sur la mousse, Tendre et fière, forte et claire, Comme une prière, Une voix de femme sortit du toit Et la maison chanta! Soprano solo Quand nos bourgeons se rouvriront, Saules rouges et gris chatons Quand nos bourgeons se rouvriront, Nos vaches meugleront. Elles sonneront du cor Coqs rouges et fumiers d'or Elles sonneront si fort, Qu'elles réveilleront les morts. Frapperont nos marteaux, Bras nus et torses chauds Et ronfleront nos scies, Autour de nos prairies. S'ouvriront nos églises, Nieuport, Ypres et Pervijze|Pervyse, Et tonneront nos cloches Le dur tocsin des Boches. Tinteront nos truelles Dixmude et Ramscapelle Et reluiront nos pelles Et cogneront nos pioches. Glisseront nos bateaux, Goudron noir et mouette Chantera l'alouette Le long de nos canaux, Et fleuriront nos tombes Mésanges et pigeons bleus Et fleuriront nos tombes, Sous le soleil de Dieu. Plus un souffle, plus un bruit, plus un chat, Rien que la signe des croix de bois ... "Venez donc, il est tard, ne nous arrêtons pas, Ce n'est qu'une paysanne restée là Avec son vieux . . . . . . . . père. Rien ne peut les convaincre, ils ne veulent pas partir, Ils disent qu'ils aiment mieux mourir Que de quitter leur terre." Plus un souffle, plus une vie, plus un chat, Rien qu'un vol de corbeaux le long du chemin de fer, Le bruit de nos bottes sur le pavé gras, ... Et la ligne des feux clignotant sur l'Yser.

== Recordings ==
- Rarely Heard Elgar & Forgotten War Music, Munich Symphony Orchestra, Douglas Bostock conducting, on ClassicO label.
- Elgar: War Music Richard Pascoe (narrator), Teresa Cahill (soprano), Barry Collett (conductor), Rutland Sinfonia
- The CD with the book Oh, My Horses! Elgar and the Great War has many historical recordings including Une voix dans le désert with Quand nos bourgeons se rouvriront, a 1985 recording with Alvar Lidell (narrator), Valerie Hill (soprano) and the Kensington Symphony Orchestra conducted by Leslie Head
- Elgar – Bax – For the Fallen, 2016 (CD HLL7544) recording live 7 April 2016 orchestra and choir The Hallé, cond. Mark Elder, recording including "The Spirit of England", Op. 80 (The Hallé, Elder Mark, soprano Rachel Nicholls), "Grania and Diarmid", Op. 42 (mezzo-soprano Shaw Madeleine) and Arnold Bax In Memoriam (only for orchestra) always 2016
