= Gérard Niding =

Canadian politician and Montreal City Councillor

Gérard Niding (1924–2011) was a Canadian politician and a City Councillor in Montreal, Quebec.

== City Councillor ==
He was elected to Montreal's City Council in 1954 as a Civic Action League candidate in the district of Papineau. He was defeated in 1957 and joined the Civic Party of Montreal in 1960. He was re-elected in that year, as well as in 1962 and 1966.

== Chairman of the Executive Council ==
He succeeded Lucien Saulnier as Chairman of Montreal's Executive Committee as served from 1970 to 1978. He was re-elected to the Council in 1970 and 1974, but did not run for re-election in 1978. He was succeeded by colleagueYvon Lamarre as Chairman of the Executive Committee.

== Role in Montreal Olympic cost overrun scandal ==
He will be most remembered for his role in the fallout from the construction of the Olympic Stadium in Montreal. An inquiry, headed by Justice Albert Malouf, led to the filing of corruption charges against Gérard Niding, who was chairman of Montreal's executive committee. Niding pleaded guilty to breach of trust and accepting a bribe for passing untendered Olympic construction contracts to engineer Régis Trudeau, who built a house for Niding in Bromont in exchange. Trudeau was convicted of breach of trust.

Political offices
Preceded by Lucien Saulnier (Civic Party)	Chairman of the Executive Committee; 1970–1978	Succeeded by Yvon Lamarre (Civic Party)
