= Paul Bruchési =

Canadian prelate

Louis Joseph Napoléon Paul Bruchési
- Archbishop of Montreal
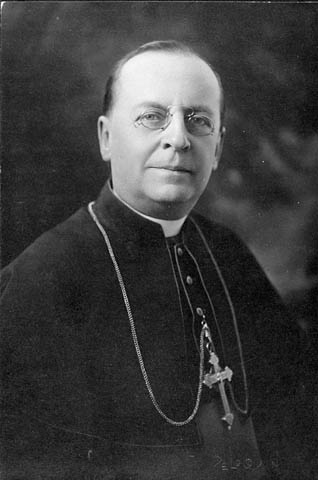
- Church: Catholic Church
- Archdiocese: Archdiocese of Montreal
- In office: June 25, 1897 – September 20, 1939
- Predecessor: Édouard-Charles Fabre
- Successor: Georges Gauthier

Orders
- Ordination: December 21, 1878 by Raffaele Monaco La Valletta
- Consecration: August 8, 1897 by Louis-Nazaire Bégin

Personal details
- Born: October 29, 1855 Montreal, Canada East, Province of Canada, British Empire
- Died: September 20, 1939 (aged 83) Montreal, Quebec, Dominion of Canada, British Empire
- Coat of arms

Louis Joseph Napoléon Paul Bruchési (October 29, 1855 – September 20, 1939) was a Canadian prelate, the second Archbishop of Montreal. In 1910 he directed the 21st International Eucharistic Congress held in Montreal.

== Life ==
Louis-Joseph-Paul-Napoléon Bruchési was born on October 29, 1855, in Montreal, Quebec, one of seven children born to Paul and Caroline Aubry Bruchési. His father was a grocer. He attended the Petit Séminaire de Montréal before studying at seminaries in Issy and St. Sulpice in Paris. Bruchési resided at the Pontifical French Seminary while continuing his studies at the Roman College. He was ordained as a priest in 1878 by Cardinal La Valletta, with a special dispensation as he was underage.

Bruchési served as secretary to Archbishop Fabre. He taught dogma for four years at the Université Laval in Quebec, served as a parish priest, and from 1878 to 1887 as a professor at the Université Laval à Montréal. In 1887, he became the director of the diocesan magazine, La Semaine religieuse. In 1890 Bruchési became chaplain to the convent of the Religious of the Sacred Heart. He became a cathedral canon in 1891, and vice-rector of Laval, Montreal. He was the ecclesiastical superior of the Sisters of Saint Anne and archdeacon for the parochial affairs of the archdiocese. He served on the Commission representing Canada at the Chicago World's Fair in 1893.

=== Bishop ===
Bruchési was appointed archbishop in 1897. As archbishop, he promoted devotion to the Sacred Heart. He completed the Home for Incurables and Saint-Jacques Cathedral (Montreal). In 1898 he assisted with the establishment of the Hôpital du Sacré-Cœur de Montréal. He established St. John's Union for poor and infirm priests, and erected twenty-three parishes. During his tenure, Saint Joseph's Oratory was founded by Saint André Bessette. In 1904 the Roman Catholic Diocese of Joliette was erected from Montreal.

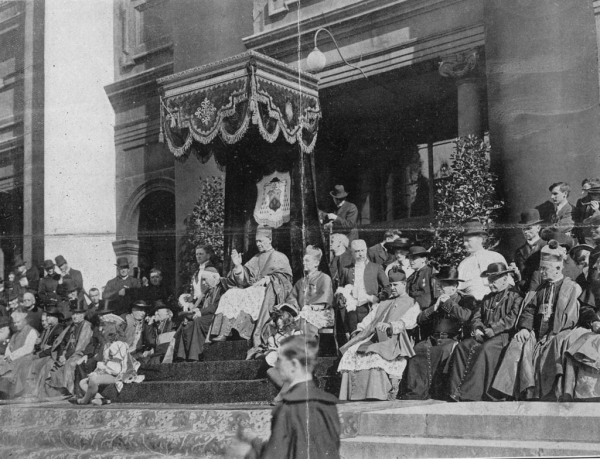
Papal Legate Cardinal Vannutelli blesses children, Eucharistic Congress, 1910

Archbishop Bruchési directed the 21st International Eucharistic Congress held in Montreal in 1910. More than a hundred studies on the Blessed Eucharist — in relation to dogma, moral, history, discipline, pious practices, devotions, and associations — were read and discussed. James Cardinal Gibbons, Archbishop of Baltimore, preached at the High Mass on 11 September.

It was Under Bruchési's leadership that in 1919 the University of Montreal became an autonomous institution. He was a member of the Royal Society of Canada, and a contributor to Semaine Religieuse and the Catholic Encyclopedia. In 1919, Bruchési was admitted to Hôtel-Dieu hospital with an unidentified illness. In the face of failing health, on October 18, 1921, auxiliary bishop Msgr. Georges Gauthier was appointed Apostolic Administrator. Archbishop Bruchési died on September 20, 1939, at the age of 84. In all, Paul Bruchési was a priest for over 60 years and a bishop for 40 years.

Catholic Church titles
Preceded by Edouard Charles Fabre	Archbishop of Montreal; 1897–1939	Succeeded by Georges Gauthier
