= Émile Cammaerts =

Belgian playwright, poet and author

Émile Cammaerts CBE
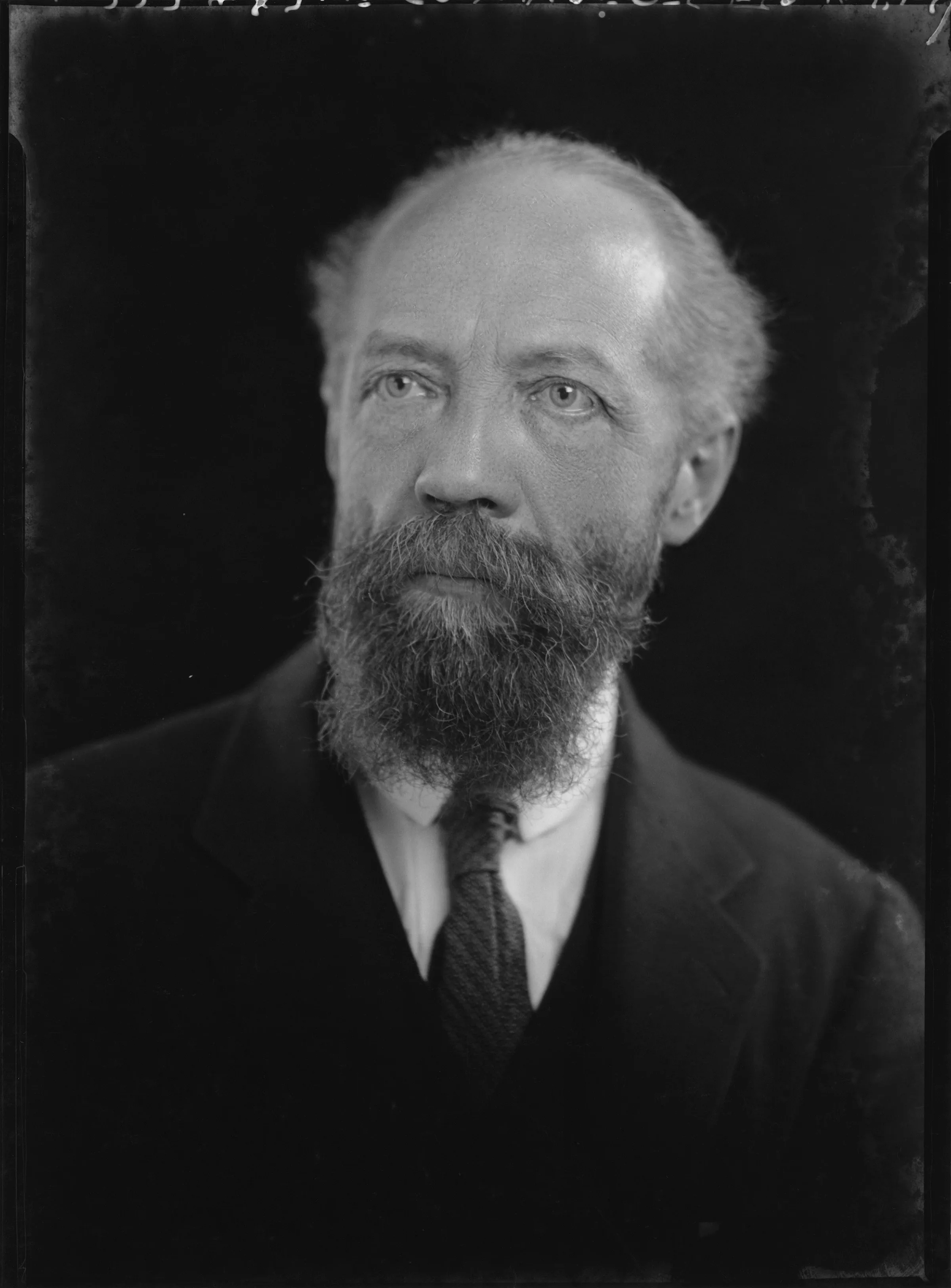
- Cammaerts in 1928
- Born: Émile Leon Cammaerts; 16 March 1878; Saint-Gilles, Brussels, Belgium
- Died: 2 November 1953 (aged 75); Radlett, Hertfordshire, England
- Occupations: Playwright; poet; author
- Spouse: Helen Tita Braun
- Children: 6, including Francis

Émile Leon Cammaerts CBE (16 March 1878 in Saint-Gilles, Belgium – 2 November 1953, Radlett, Hertfordshire) was a Belgian playwright, poet (including war poet) and author who wrote primarily in English and French. (Note: Summarised by archivist Zoë Browne: "...became Professor Emeritus after his retirement from the university in 1947. He also received an honorary LL.D. from the University of Glasgow and a CBE. He was a fellow of the Royal Historical Society. During his life, Émile Cammaerts was a cartographer, geographer, journalist [for The Guardian (Anglican newspaper) that ended in 1951], poet, playwright, historian, art critic and devoted Anglican. He was Belgian by nationality, and deeply immersed in Belgian politics and culture.)

Cammaerts translated three books by art, history and landscape expert John Ruskin (Note: Ruskin's Discussions on Architecture and Painting Conférences sur l'Architecture et la Peinture in 1910; Val d'Arno in 1911 and; Modern Landscape Painters as Les peintres modernes le paysage in 1914 all published by Henri Laurens, Paris) and selected G. K. Chesterton Father Brown detective stories in La clairvoyance du père Brown. (Note: Perrin et Cie, Paris)

He became Professor of Belgian Studies at the University of London in 1933, most of his works and papers are held there in the Senate House Library.

Cammaerts is the author of a famous quotation (often mistakenly attributed to G. K. Chesterton) in his study on Chesterton:

When men choose not to believe in God, they do not thereafter believe in nothing. They then become capable of believing in anything.

== Personal life ==
Cammaerts was born in Saint-Gilles, a suburb of Brussels. (Note: Birth certificate № 234 in 1878, Saint-Gilles. His father Jean François Pierre Cammaerts, a lawyer, came from the town of Vilvoorde. His Brussels-born mother was Marie Henriëtte Eugénie Nypels whose father, also a lawyer, was born in Maastricht in present-day Dutch Limburg.) He was educated at the Free University of Brussels and later at the experimental Université Nouvelle where he studied geography. He migrated to England in 1908 and was baptised as an Anglican at age 34 (c. 1912) henceforth taking the middle name Pieter.

He married the Shakespearian actress Helen Tita Braun, known as Tita Brand (daughter of opera singer Marie Brema), with whom he had six children, including Pieter Cammaerts, who was killed while serving in the Royal Air Force during World War II, prominent SOE operative Francis Cammaerts (Note: Francis Cammaerts was awarded the Distinguished Service Order and the Legion d'honneur, Croix de Guerre and the American Medal of Freedom.) and Catherine Noel "Kippe" Cammaerts, an actress and mother of Michael Morpurgo. Jeanne Cammaerts (later Jeanne Lindley) collaborated with her father on Principalities and Powers (1947) and wrote his biography in 1962.

== Works ==
=== Poems ===
- Belgian Poems : Chants patriotique, et autres poèmes (1915) (Note: (translated into English by his wife) John Lane and Bodley Head, London; John Lane Company, New York)
- New Belgian Poems. Les trois rois et autres poèmes (1916 – 3 editions) (Note: (translated into English by his wife) John Lane and Bodley Head, London; John Lane Company, New York)
- Messines and other Poems (1918)

=== Stage productions ===
- A Christmas virgil at The New Theatre, St Martins Lane (1910) Tita played the widow
- Carillon, stage recitation, music by Edward Elgar: (Note: at the first performance the poem was read by Tita Brand, Cammaerts' wife) (1914)
- Une voix dans le désert, stage recitation in English and French versions with music by Edward Elgar (1915) containing the poem for soprano aria below
  - Quand nos bourgeons se rouvriront and for the English version When the spring comes round from Une voix dans le désert
- Le drapeau belge, recitation, with music by Edward Elgar (1917)

=== Books ===
- The Adoration of Soldiers (1916) with illustrated poems (Note: With Louis Raemaekers, illustrator Longmans and Green and Co, London)
- La Veillée de Noël. Les deux bossus (1917) (Note: Librarie Moderne, Brussels and London)
- Through the iron bars, two years of German occupation in Belgium (1917)
- A ma patrie enchainée (1918) (Note: G. Van Oest et Cie, Brussels and Paris)
- A history of Belgium from the Roman invasion to the present day (1921/2) (Note: T Fisher Unwin Ltd, London)
- The legend of Ulenspiegel (1922)
- The Treasure of Belgium (1924)
- The Poetry of Nonsense (1925)
- Discoveries in England (1930)
- Albert of Belgium, defender of right, a biography of King Albert I of Belgium (1935)
- The Laughing Prophet: The Seven Virtues And G. K. Chesterton (Study of G. K. Chesterton – 1937)
- The Keystone of Europe (1939)
- The Prisoner at Laeken: King Leopold, Legend and Fact (1941)
- The Situation of Belgium: September 1939 to January 1941 (1941)
- Upon this rock (1943)
- The flower of grass (1944/5) (Note: Cresset Press, London)
- The peace that is left (1945)
- Principalities and Powers with Jeanne Lindley (1947) (Note: Cresset Press, London)
- The Devil takes the Chair (1949) (Note: Cresset Press, London)
- The cloud and the silver lining (1952) (Note: A.R. Mowbray & Co, London) (followed by Christian contributions to the BBC Silver Lining Radio programme series
- The Work of our Hands (1953) book on the themes of art and religion

=== Other ===
- Translation of Guido Gezelle from the West Flemish dialect with Charles Van der Borren, Poèmes choisis (Note: Louvain, 1908)
- Preface to The glory of Belgium – An anthology (1915) collated and edited by Russell Markland and dedicated on the front opening to Cammaerts.
- Baron Edmond de Cartier de Marchienne (1946) booklet
- Article on William Dobson, painter An English successor to van Dyck: William Dobson Second series no III (Note: Penguin Parade by Penguin Books, Harmondsworth, 1948)
