= Quand nos bourgeons se rouvriront =

"Quand nos bourgeons se rouvriront" ("When the spring comes round") is a song for solo soprano, part of a staged recitation with orchestra Une voix dans le désert written by the English composer Edward Elgar in 1915. The words are by the Belgian poet Émile Cammaerts.

It was first performed in a performance of Une voix dans le désert at the Shaftesbury Theatre, London, on 29 January 1916, sung by the soprano Olga Lynn, with the recitation by the Belgian dramatic performer Carlo Liten, and the orchestra conducted by the composer.

The French title "Quand nos bourgeons se rouvriront" literally translates into "When our buds shall re-open", but in the English version of the lyrics, by Cammaerts' wife Tita Brand, it became "When the spring comes round".

The song was published separately by Elkin & Co. in 1916, inscribed "English version by R. H. Elkin". The words are the same as in the vocal score of Une voix dans le désert, so it is not clear whether the English translation of the song is by Tita Brand or by Elkin.

The Pall Mall Gazette described the scene on the wartime front in West Flanders, Belgium:

'It is night when the curtain rises, showing the battered dwelling, standing alone in the desolate land, with the twinkling of camp fires along the Yser in the distance, and in the foreground the cloaked figure of a man, who soliloquises on the spectacle ... the voice of a peasant girl is heard coming from the cottage, singing a song of hope and trust in anticipation of the day the war shall be ended ...'

== Lyrics ==
French Quand nos bourgeons se rouvriront, Saules rouges at gris chatons Quand nos bourgeons se rouvriront, Nos vaches meugleront. Elles sonneront du cor Coqs rouges et fumiers d'or Elles sonneront si fort, Qu'elles réveilleront les morts. Frapperont nos marteaux, Bras nus et torses chauds Et ronfleront nos scies, Autour de nos prairies. S'ouvriront nos églises, Nieuport, Ypres et Pervyse, Et tonneront nos cloches Le dur tocsin des Boches. Tinteront nos truelles Dixmude et Ramscapelle Et reluiront nos pelles Et cogneront nos pioches. Glisseront nos bateaux, Goudron noir et mouette Chantera l'alouette Le long de nos canaux, Et fleuriront nos tombes Mésanges et pigeons bleus Et fleuriront nos tombes, Sous le soleil de Dieu.	English translation When the spring comes round again, Willows red and tassels grey When the spring comes round again, Our cows will greet the day, They'll sound their horn triumphant, White sap and greening spear Sound it so loud and long, Until the dead once more shall hear. We shall hear our anvils, Strong arm and naked breast And in our peaceful meadows, The scythe will never rest. Ev'ry church will ope its door, Antwerp, Ypres and Nieuwpoort, The bells will then be ringing, The foe's death knell be ringing. The shall sound spade and shovel, Diksmuide and Ramscapelle And gaily gleam the trowel, While through the air the pick is swinging. From the ports our boats will glide. Anchor up and mooring slipt The lark on high will be soaring Above our rivers wide. And then our graves will flower, Heart'sease and golden rod And then our graves will flower Beneath the peace of God.

== Recordings ==
- The CD with the book Oh, My Horses! Elgar and the Great War has many historical recordings including Une voix dans le désert with Quand nos bourgeons se rouvriront, a 1985 recording with Alvar Lidell (narrator), Valerie Hill (soprano) and the Kensington Symphony Orchestra conducted by Leslie Head
