= Joseph-Napoléon Drapeau =

Canadian politician

Member of the Montreal City Council for Rosemont

Personal details
- Died: 23 April 1974 - Age: 84
- Party: Civic Action League (Ligue d'Action Civique)
- Occupation: Insurance agent, politician

Joseph-Napoléon Drapeau was a Canadian politician. He was a City Councillor in Montreal, Quebec.

== Background ==
He was an insurance agent and was the father of eight-term Mayor Jean Drapeau.

== City Councillor ==
Drapeau was appointed to the City Council by the Comité des Citoyens de Montréal (Montreal Citizens' Committee) and served from 1944 to 1954.

In 1954, was chosen by home owners to remain on the Council as one of his son's Civic Action League (Ligue d'Action Civique) candidates. He was re-elected in 1957, became a co-founder of the Civic Party of Montreal like his son and was re-elected in 1960.

He successfully ran for a seat in 1962 and was re-elected in 1966. He represented the district of Rosemont.

== Retirement from Politics ==
He did not run for re-election in 1970.
