= Édouard-Raymond Fabre =

Canadian politician

Mayor Édouard-Raymond Fabre
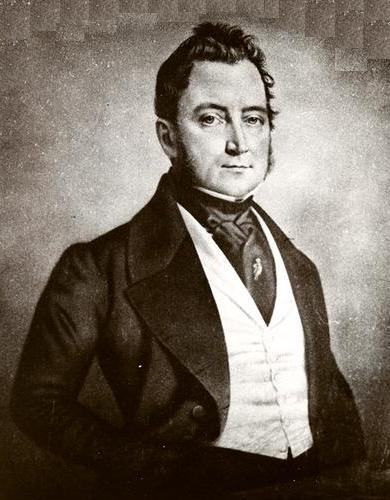

6th Mayor of Montreal
- In office 1849–1851
- Preceded by: Joseph Bourret
- Succeeded by: Charles Wilson
- Constituency: East

Personal details
- Born: 15 September 1799 Montreal, Lower Canada
- Died: 16 July 1854 (aged 54) Montreal, Canada East
- Resting place: Notre Dame des Neiges Cemetery
- Children: Hector Fabre, Édouard-Charles Fabre
- Profession: bookseller

Édouard-Raymond Fabre (15 September 1799 – 16 July 1854) was a Canadian politician and bookseller, the Mayor of Montreal, Quebec between 1849 and 1851.

== Life ==
Édouard-Raymond Fabre was born in Montreal 15 September 1799, the son of Pierre Fabre and his wife, Marie-Anne Lamontagne. His father was a carpenter. In 1807, he began studies at the Petit Séminaire de Montréal, where he remained until 1812 after which he was employed at a prominent hardware store owned by Arthur Webster. After nearly a decade there, Fabre spent a year in Paris to gain experience in book retailing at the Galeries Bossange.

On 9 May 1826 Fabre married Luce Perrault, sister of patriote Charles-Ovide Perrault, in Montreal’s Church of Notre-Dame. In 1832 he was a founding member of the Maison Canadienne de Commerce, set up to compete with the large British houses. He became the owner of the patriote English newspaper Vindicator and Canadian Advertiser, edited by Edmund Bailey O'Callaghan.

In 1835 he established a bookstore at the corner of Rue Saint-Vincent and Rue Notre-Dame with his nephew, Jean-Adolphe Gravel. Their inventory included a wide assortment of religious texts, school books, stationery, and religious articles. They later expanded to publishing and book-binding. He was part owner of the steamship Le Patriote. Fabre was also member of the Saint-Jean-Baptiste Society, established to promote French-Canadian interests within Canada and to preserve the French language and culture, and the Roman Catholic religion. He played a major role in the creation of La Banque du peuple, acting as its treasurer when it officially opened in 1835.

Fabre remained in the bookselling business for years while supporting the Patriote movement for much of this time. The bookstore became a meeting place for the Patriotes. He took part in the Rebellion of 1837-1838, was taken prisoner, and was then released due to lack of evidence and in consideration of his wife’s illness. After calm was restored, he showed great generosity to the victims of the conflict, particularly to the exiles in Australia.

In 1848, Fabre entered municipal politics when he was elected a councillor in Montreal's East Ward. The following year he was elected Mayor, prompted a financial restructure of the city's finances, and introduced measures to manage a cholera outbreak. Despite his reluctance to serve a second year as Mayor, Fabre served in that role until 1851. During his tenure, he created a full-time group of firefighters.

Édouard-Raymond Fabre contracted cholera and died in July 1854. Leading politician Louis-Joseph Papineau paid tribute, declaring that Fabre "rendered outstanding services to the country." He was entombed at the Notre Dame des Neiges Cemetery in Montreal.

He was the father of Archbishop Édouard-Charles Fabre.

Édouard-Raymond Fabre is commemorated by a street in the Plateau Mont-Royal district and a park in Mercier-Hochelaga-Maisonneuve.

== Sources ==
- Biography at the Dictionary of Canadian Biography Online
- Édouard-Raymond Fabre at City of Montreal
- (in French) Quebec textbook lists for Fabre, Édouard-Raymond at Université Laval
