= Carillon (Elgar) =

1914 composition by Edward Elgar

Edward Elgar in 1917

Carillon is a recitation with orchestral accompaniment written by the English composer Edward Elgar as his Op. 75, in 1914. The words are by the Belgian poet Émile Cammaerts.

It was first performed in the Queen's Hall, London, on 7 December 1914, with the recitation by Cammaerts' wife Tita Brand, and the orchestra conducted by the composer.

The work was performed in January 1915 at the London Coliseum with Henry Ainley, and at Harrogate on 28 August 1915, with the soprano the Hon. Mrs. Julian Clifford and a military band. The band arrangement was by Percy Fletcher.

On 15 August 1918, Carillon and Le drapeau belge were performed with success at a popular concert in Prospect Park, Brooklyn, with the recitations by the Belgian dramatic artist Carlo Liten.

== History ==
History records the reasons why Germany invaded and occupied "neutral" Belgium in August 1914, and the horrific events which followed when Belgium showed armed resistance: cities and people were destroyed, and the country put to almost complete ruin. King Albert and his army resisted but were quickly forced back to West Flanders on the Flemish side of the country. There was much national sympathy: in London, at Christmas, a patriotic anthology called King Albert's Book ("A tribute to the Belgian King and people from representative men and women throughout the world") was organised by Hall Caine with contributions from leading artists, writers and musicians. Elgar was asked to contribute, and he remembered reading in The Observer a poem by Émile Cammaerts. Cammaerts was married to Tita Brand, the daughter of the singer Marie Brema who had sung in the first performance of Elgar's Dream of Gerontius, and Elgar had her immediate approval for the use of the poem.

Elgar's friend and candid biographer, Rosa Burley, recalled:

I ventured to suggest that he should not tie himself to the metre of the words, as he would have to do if the piece were treated as a song or choral item, but that he should provide an illustrative prelude and entr'actes as background music for a recitation of the poem.

Elgar took Miss Burley's advice, and set the poem as narratives and recitatives interspersed with orchestral interludes.

Miss Burley was present at the premiere by Tita Brand at Queen's Hall, and related how it had to be arranged for her state to be hidden from the audience:

...unfortunately Mme Brand-Cammaerts was enceinte and in order to conceal this fact an enormous bank of roses was built on the platform over which her head and shoulders appeared rather in the manner of a Punch and Judy show. Mme Brand put such energy into the performance that both Edward, who was conducting the orchestra, and I, who was sitting in the audience, trembled for the effect on her, but patriotic fervour won the day, and Carillon was performed without mishap.

The version for voice with piano accompaniment was published, with the French words only, in King Albert's Book.

== Music ==
An obvious characteristic of the music is the downward scale of four notes in the bass (B♭, A, G, F), which is a repeated accompaniment (ostinato) through the whole of the introduction before the first words are recited. The work is written in a triple metre. The opening tune is confident and waltz-like, and the accents of the scale motif, like a repeated peal of church bells, never coincide with the natural waltz rhythm: it is the three-pulse of the waltz against the four of the bell motif. When the bell motif is not in the bass it is found elsewhere, high up, having changed places with a brilliant passage of triplets now in the bass. When the music does stop, it is a call for attention to the spoken poem.

Elgar's vigorous waltz-like tune is memorable, is in effect a song without words; and his orchestration perfectly appropriate. Both words and music are powerful, and the work succeeds remarkably by their contrast and support of each other.

== Lyrics ==
The original words are in French, with the English translation by Tita Brand.

The recitation starts after an orchestral introduction.

Français [la voix seule] CHANTONS, BELGES, CHANTONS, Même si les blessures saignent, même si la voix se brise, Plus haut que la tourmente, plus fort que les canons, Chantons l'orgueil de nos défaites, Par ce beau soleil d'automne, Et la joie de rester honnêtes Quand la lâcheté nous serait si bonne. [avec l'orchestre] Au son du tambour, au son du clairon, Sur les ruines d'Aerschot, de Dinant, de Termonde, Dansons, Belges, dansons, [seule] En chantant notre gloire, Même si les yeux brûlent, Si la tête s'égare, Formons la ronde! [l'orchestre] [seule] Avec des branches de hêtre, de hêtre flamboyant, Au son du tambour, Nous couvrirons les tombes de nos enfants. [l'orchestre] [seule] Nous choisirons un jour, Comme celui-ci. Où les peupliers tremblent doucement Dans le vent, Et où l'odeur des feuilles mortes Embaume les bois, Comme aujourd'hui, Afin qu'ils emportent Là-bas Le parfum du pays. [l'orchestre] [avec l'orchestre] Nous prierons la terre qu'ils ont tant aimée De les bercer dans ses grands bras, De les réchauffer sur sa vaste poitrine Et de les faire rêver de nouvaux combats: De la prise de Bruxelles, de Malines, De Namur, de Liège, de Louvain, [seule] Et de leur entrée triomphale, là-bas, A Berlin! [l'orchestre] [seule] Chantons, Belges, chantons, Même si les blessures saignent, et si la voix se brise, Plus haut que la tourmente, plus fort que les canons, Même si les blessures saignent, même si le coeur se brise, Chantons l'espoir et la haise implacable, Par ce beau soleil d'automne, Et la fierté de rester charitables Quand la Vengeance nous serait si bonne! [l'orchestre jusqu'à la fin]|	English [voice alone] SING, BELGIANS, SING Although our wounds may bleed, Although our voices break, Louder than the storm, louder than the guns, Sing of the pride of our defeats 'Neath this bright Autumn sun, And sing of the joy of honour When cowardice might be so sweet. [with the orchestra] To the sound of the bugle, the sound of the drum, On the ruins of Aerschot, of Dinant, and Termonde, Dance, Belgians, dance, [alone] And our glory sing, Although our eyes may burn, Although our brain may turn, Join in the ring! [orchestra] [alone] With branches of beech, of flaming beech, To the sound of the drum, We'll cover the graves of our children. [orchestra] [alone] We'll choose a daylike this When the poplars tremble softly In the breeze, And all the woods are scented With the smell of dying leaves, That they may bear with them beyond The perfume of our land. [orchestra] [with the orchestra] We'll ask the earth they loved so well, To rock them in her great arms, To warm them on her mighty breast, And send them dreams of other fights, Retaking Liège, Malines, Brussels, Louvain, and Namur, [alone] And of their triumphant entry, at last, In Berlin! [orchestra] [alone] Sing, Belgians, Sing! Although our wounds may bleed, although our voices break, Louder than the storm, louder than the guns, Although our wounds may bleed, although our hearts may break, Sing of hope and fiercest hate, 'Neath this bright Autumn sun. Sing of the pride of charity When vengeance would be so sweet. [orchestra to end]

== Recordings ==
- Elgar: War Music Richard Pascoe (narrator), Barry Collett (conductor), Rutland Sinfonia
- The CD with the book Oh, My Horses! Elgar and the Great War has many historical recordings including two of Carillon: a 1915 recording with Henry Ainley (speaker) and an orchestra conducted by Elgar, and a 1975 recording with Alvar Lidell and the Kensington Symphony Orchestra conducted by Leslie Head
