= George E. Gauthier =

Canadian civil servant (1911–1983)

George Etienne Gauthier, OC (December 31, 1911 – November 26, 1983) was a Canadian civil servant.

He was born in Sorel-Tracy, Quebec and attended University of Montreal H.E.C. In 1968, he was made an Officer of the Order of Canada for his contribution to Centennial Year, especially as Associate Commissioner on the Centennial Commission.
