= Joseph-Marie Savignac =

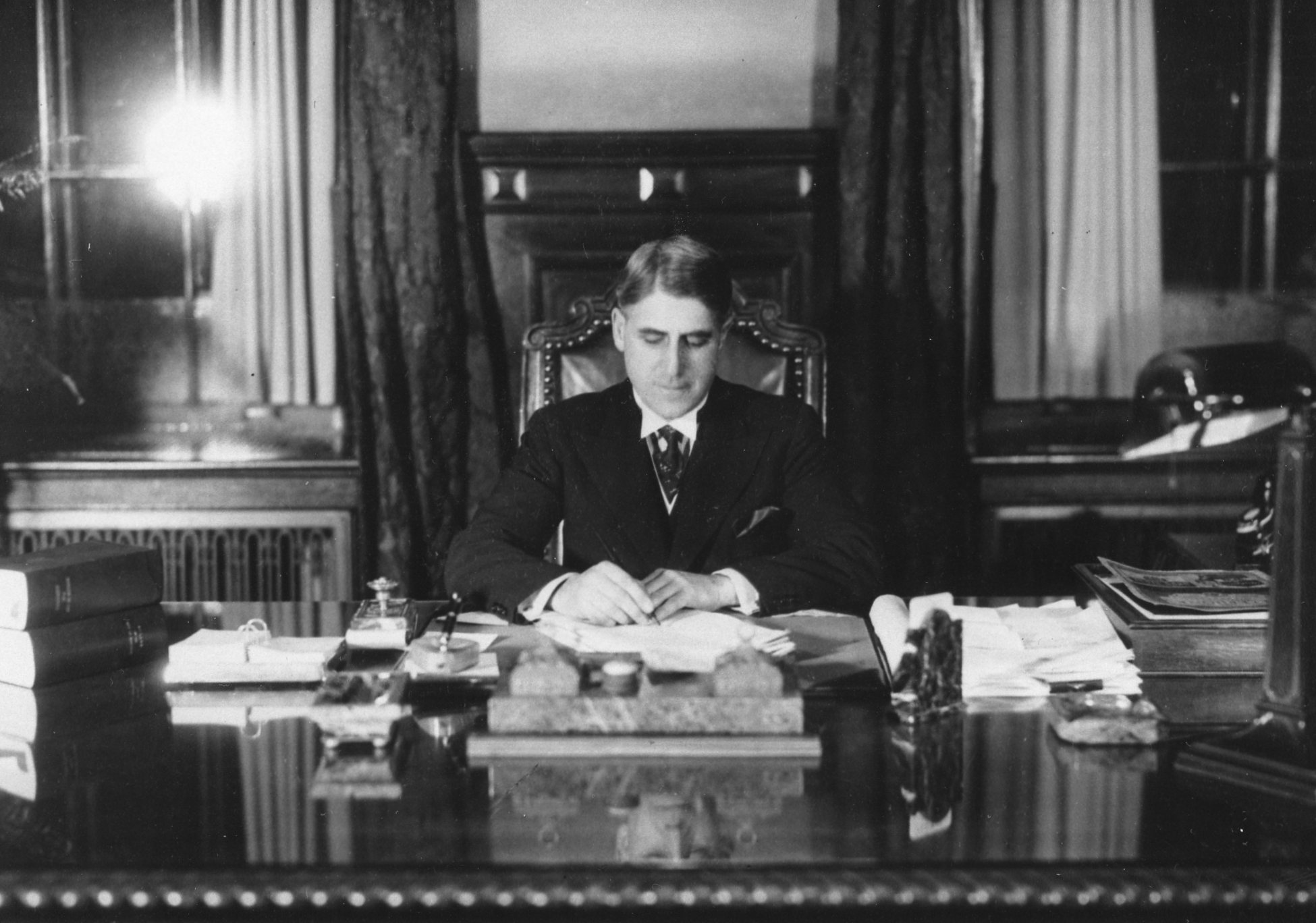

Joseph-Marie Savignac was a Canadian politician and a City Councillor in Montreal, Quebec.

== City Councillor ==
He ran for a seat on Montreal's City Council in the district of Saint-Denis in 1926 and 1928, but lost against Joseph Alonzo Savard. He defeated Savard in 1930, but Savard won the seat back in 1932. Savignac won again in 1934. He was re-elected in 1936, 1938, 1940, 1942, 1944, 1947, 1950, 1954 and 1957. He did not run for re-election in 1960.

== Chairman of the Executive Council ==
He served as Chairman of Montreal's Executive Committee during Camillien Houde's tenure as Mayor from 1934 to 1936 and from 1936 to 1938, as well as during Sarto Fournier's term from 1957 to 1960.

== Footnotes ==
Political offices
Preceded by Joseph-Maurice Gabias	Chairman of the Executive Committee; 1934-1936	Succeeded by Ovide Taillefer
Preceded by Ovide Taillefer	Chairman of the Executive Committee; 1938-1940	Succeeded by J.-Omer Asselin
Preceded by Pierre DesMarais (Civic Action League)	Chairman of the Executive Committee; 1957-1960	Succeeded by Lucien Saulnier (Civic Party)
