= Charles Duquette =

Canadian politician

Mayor Charles Duquette
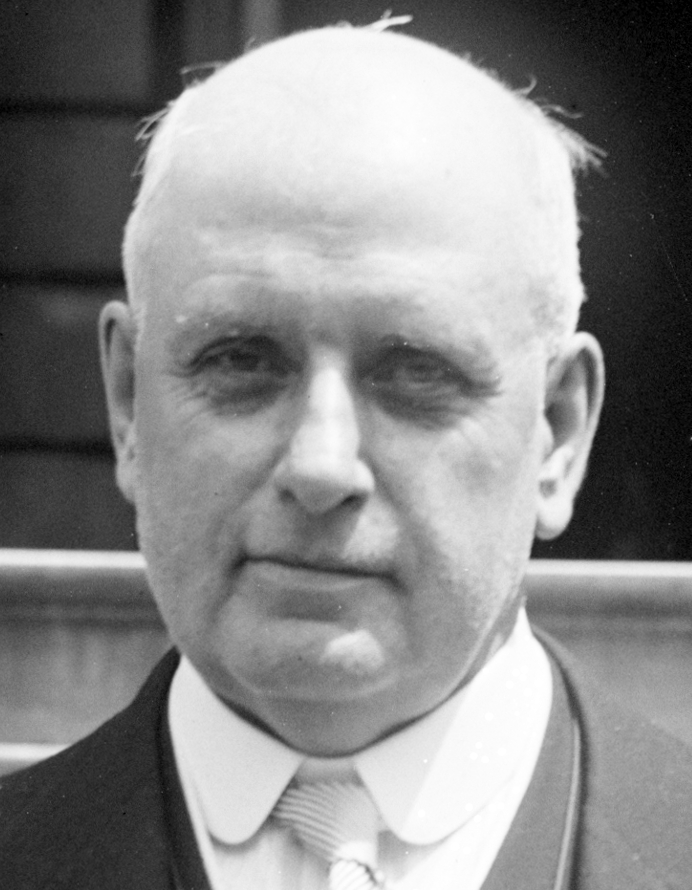

33rd Mayor of Montreal
- In office 1924–1926
- Preceded by: Médéric Martin
- Succeeded by: Médéric Martin (returned)

Personal details
- Born: 25 July 1869 Montreal, Quebec, Canada
- Died: 30 December 1937 (aged 68) Montreal, Quebec, Canada
- Profession: Businessman

Charles Duquette (25 July 1869 – 30 December 1937) was a Canadian politician. He was the mayor of Montreal, Quebec, from 1924 to 1926.

Born in Montreal, he studied commercial studies at the Collège de Saint-Henri. He worked for the mutual insurance company L'Alliance nationale and eventually became its general manager and president in 1922. He defeated Médéric Martin to become mayor in 1924 and lost in 1926 to Martin.

He is buried in Notre Dame des Neiges Cemetery.
