= Henry Archer Ekers =

Former mayor of Montreal, Quebec (1906–1908)

Mayor Henry Archer Ekers
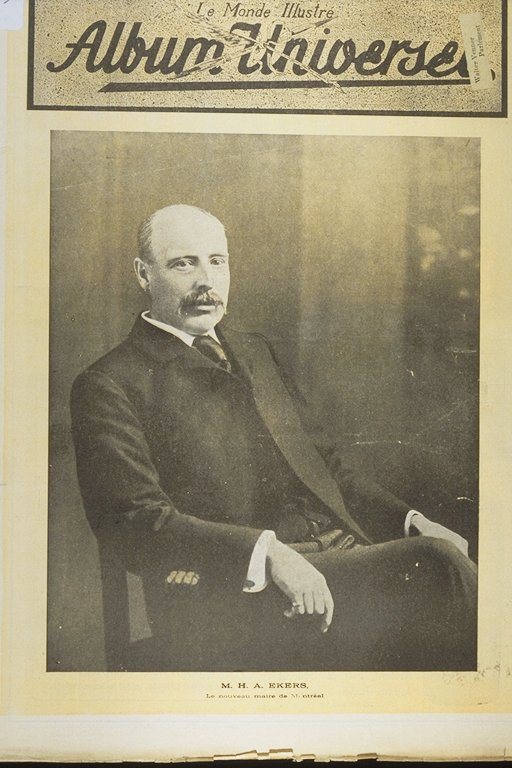
- Henry Archer Ekers, on cover of Album Universel, February 1906

28th Mayor of Montreal
- In office 1906–1908
- Preceded by: Hormidas Laporte
- Succeeded by: Louis Payette
- Constituency: Saint-Laurent

Personal details
- Born: 8 September 1855 Montreal, Canada East
- Died: 1 February 1927 (aged 71) Montreal, Quebec, Canada
- Resting place: Mount Royal Cemetery
- Profession: Business magnate, brewing

Henry Archer Ekers (8 September 1855 – 1 February 1927) was a Canadian industrialist and politician, the Mayor of Montreal, Quebec between 1906 and 1908. He ran unsuccessfully for the House of Commons of Canada as a Conservative in 1900 and 1908. Ekers was the last Anglophone Mayor of Montreal until Michael Applebaum was appointed in 2012.

== Biography ==
Ekers' parents were both born in England. Relocated to Montreal, his father became a brewery owner, working from St. Lawrence Boulevard.

He was educated at the Montreal Collegiate School before joining his father's company, Ekers Brewery. Ekers eventually founded National Breweries Limited.

== Political career ==
Ekers represented the St. Lawrence ward on Montreal city council.

== Gallery ==
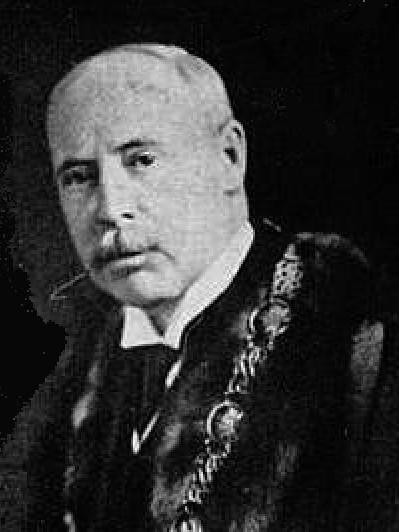

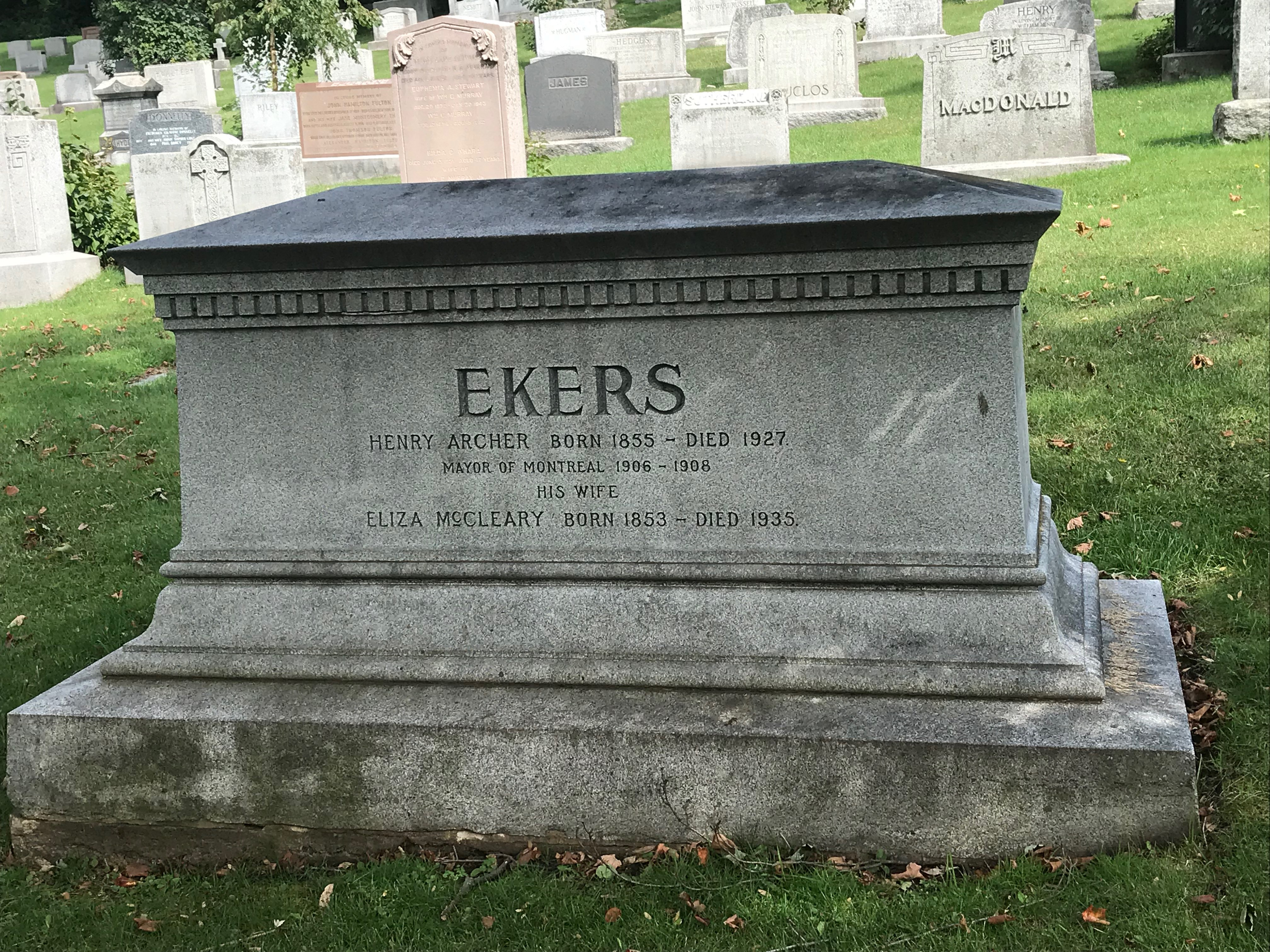

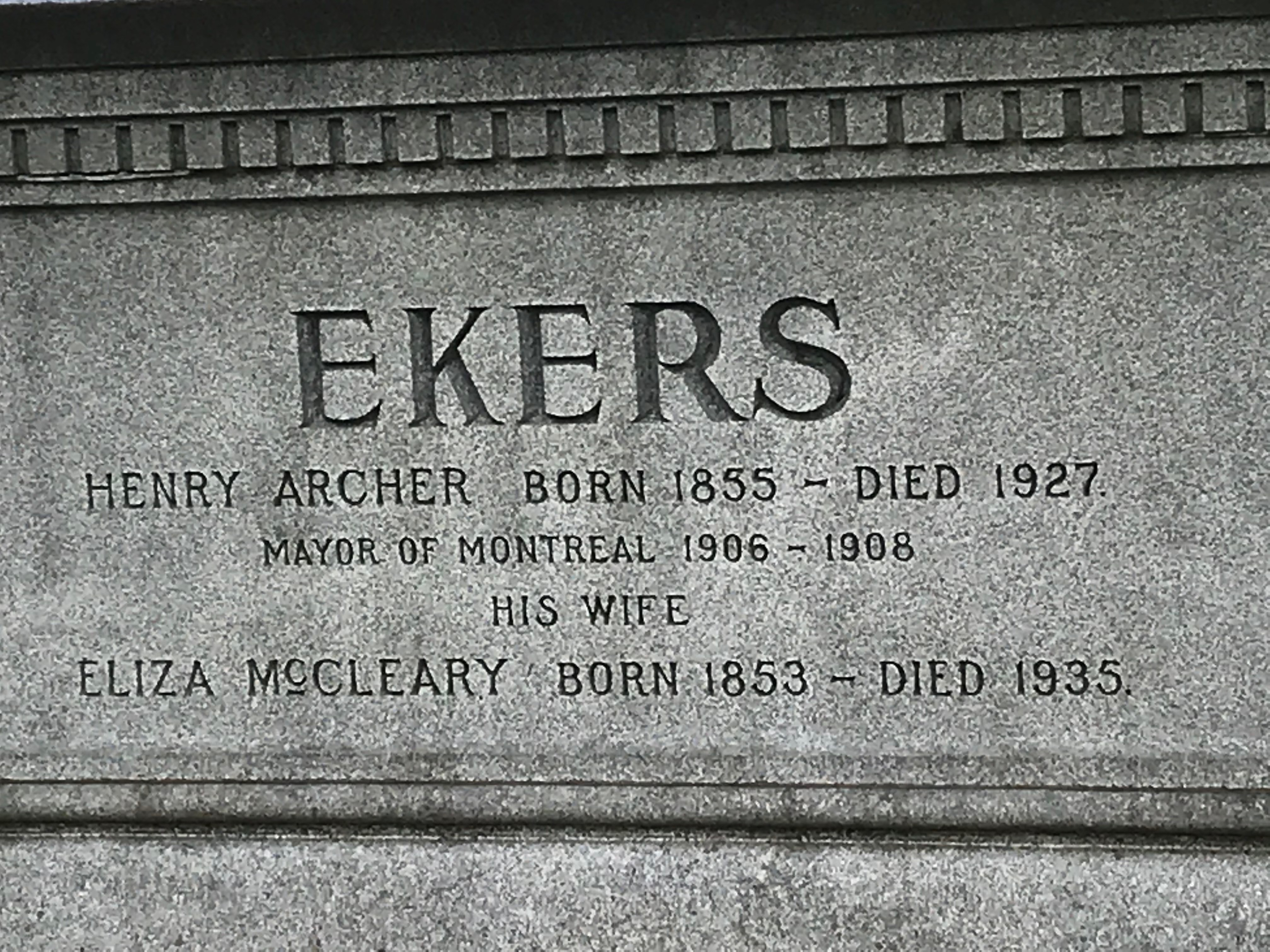
