= Médéric Martin =

Canadian politician (1869–1946)

The Honourable Médéric Martin
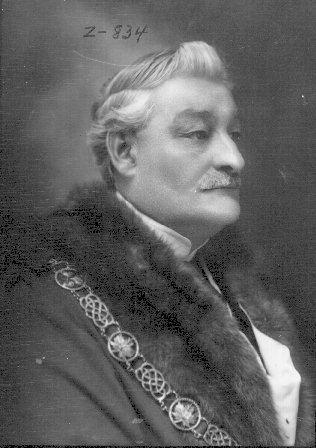

32nd Mayor of Montreal
- In office 1914–1924
- Preceded by: Louis-Arsène Lavallée
- Succeeded by: Charles Duquette
- Constituency: Papineau
- In office 1926–1928
- Preceded by: Charles Duquette
- Succeeded by: Camillien Houde

Member of the Canada Parliament for St. Mary
- In office 1906–1917
- Preceded by: Camille Piché
- Succeeded by: Hermas Deslauriers

Member of the Legislative Council of Quebec for Alma
- In office 1919–1946
- Preceded by: Trefflé Berthiaume
- Succeeded by: Joseph-Olier Renaud

Personal details
- Born: 22 January 1869 Montreal, Quebec, Canada
- Died: 12 June 1946 (aged 77) Laval, Quebec, Canada
- Party: Liberal Party of Canada
- Profession: industrialist

Médéric Martin (22 January 1869 – 12 June 1946) was a Canadian politician and long-time Mayor of Montreal.

== Background ==
Born to Salomon Martin, a carpenter and Virginie Lafleur, Martin studied at St. Eustache College and went on to open a cigar store in Montreal's East End and soon became a populist politician, best known for stirring up suspicion against English Montreal residents.

== Member of the House of Commons ==
He served as a Liberal Member of Parliament for Sainte-Marie in the city's east side from 1906 to 1917.

== City Councillor ==
Better known as a city politician, he was elected to the City Council in 1906 and represented the Papineau Ward. He was re-elected in 1908 but was defeated in 1910. He was elected again in 1912.

== Mayor of Montreal ==
In 1914 Martin was elected Mayor of Montreal. He was re-elected in 1916, 1918 and 1921, but lost against Charles Duquette in 1924. He was re-elected again in 1926, but was defeated by bitter rival Camillien Houde in 1928. His 12 years as mayor of Montreal made him, at the time, the city's longest-serving mayor.

Martin oversaw the city during a period when several other adjacent municipalities were merged, including Notre-Dame-de-Grâce and much of the predominantly French speaking east side. He considered Montreal's new French-demographic dominance to be justification for discontinuing the longstanding tradition of alternating mayors between English and French speakers, a practice that has never returned.

== Legislative Councillor ==
Martin was appointed to the Legislative Council of Quebec in 1919 and represented the district of Alma.

After his death in 1946, he was entombed at the Notre Dame des Neiges Cemetery in Montreal.

Political offices
Preceded by Édouard Chausée	City Councillor, District of Papineau # 1; 1906–1910	Succeeded by Émile Gauvin
Preceded by Émile Gauvin	City Councillor, District of Papineau # 1; 1912–1914	Succeeded by Julien Therrien
