= John Easton Mills =

Canadian politician (1796–1847)

Mayor John Easton Mills
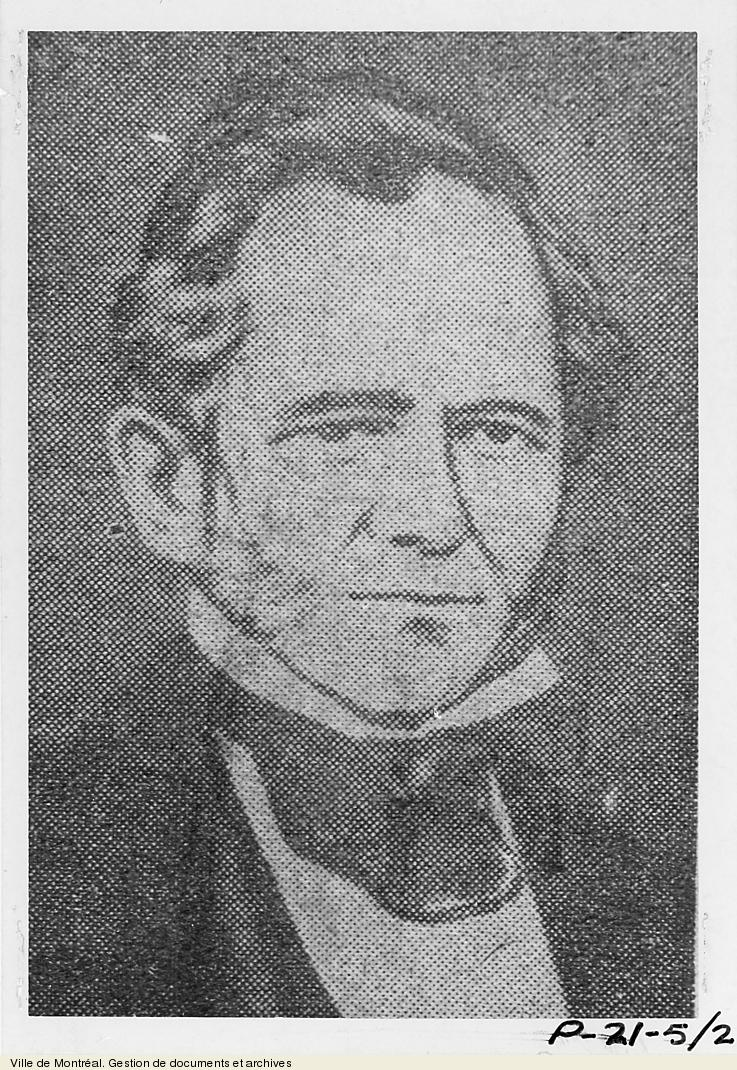

5th Mayor of Montreal
- In office 1846–1847
- Preceded by: James Ferrier
- Succeeded by: Joseph Bourret

Personal details
- Born: October 14, 1796 Tolland, Massachusetts, United States
- Died: November 12, 1847 (aged 51) Montreal, Lower Canada
- Party: Reformist
- Profession: businessman

John Easton Mills (October 14, 1796 – November 12, 1847) served briefly as mayor of Montreal, Quebec.

In March 1846, Montreal city council deadlocked on the choice of a mayor. Mills had ten votes, and incumbent mayor James Ferrier had nine, but Ferrier voted for himself twice, in accordance with existing rules. Municipal paralysis ensued until December 1846, when Mills was elected decisively.

== Typhus outbreak ==
In 1847 there was a major outbreak of typhus in Montreal among Irish immigrants. Mills organized measures to contain the epidemic and volunteered to tend to the sick, whereupon he contracted the disease himself and died after less than one year in office.
