= Louis-Arsène Lavallée =

Mayor Louis-Arsène Lavallée
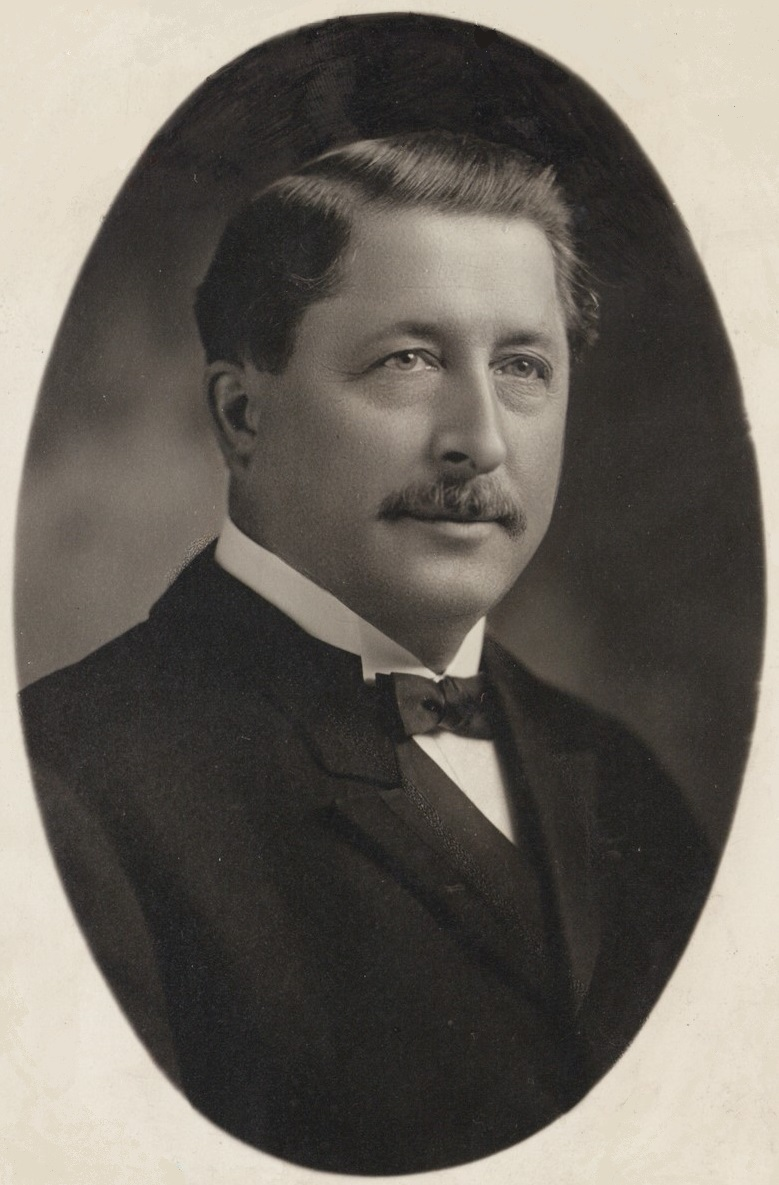

31st Mayor of Montreal
- In office 1912–1914
- Preceded by: James John Edmund Guerin
- Succeeded by: Médéric Martin

Personal details
- Born: 2 February 1861 Berthier-en-Haut, Province of Canada
- Died: 19 November 1936 (aged 75) Montreal, Quebec, Canada
- Profession: lawyer

Louis-Arsène Lavallée (2 February 1861, Berthier-en-Haut, Province of Canada – 19 November 1936 at Montreal) was the Mayor of Montreal, Canada.

His education was first at the Collège de Joliette, then at Université Laval's Montreal campus for law studies (which is today the Université de Montréal). He was admitted to the bar in 1884.

Lavallée worked with Hormidas Laporte to create the Alliance Nationale insurance company in 1892. After an unsuccessful run for the federal riding of St. James in the 1896 election, Lavallée became a Montreal local councillor, initially for the Saint-Jacques ward from 1900, and later for the La Fontaine ward in 1904. In 1912, he was elected Mayor of Montreal and served in that role until the 1914 election.

During his local political career, Lavallée advocated for the consolidation and amalgamation of surrounding municipalities into a larger Montreal and saw the annexation of municipalities such as Côte-des-Neiges during that time.
