= Louis Payette =

Mayor Louis Payette
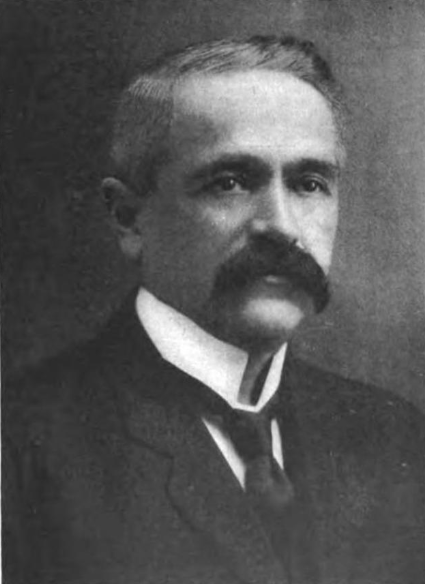

29th Mayor of Montreal
- In office 1908–1910
- Preceded by: Henry Archer Ekers
- Succeeded by: James John Edmund Guerin

Personal details
- Born: 25 December 1854 Montreal, Canada East
- Died: 19 March 1930 (aged 75) Montreal, Quebec, Canada

Louis Payette (25 December 1854 – 19 March 1930) was a Canadian construction contractor and politician who became the Mayor of Montreal, Quebec, between 1908 and 1910.

Payette was educated at the Académie des Frères des écoles chrétiennes, focused on business studies, and then began his career in the construction industry.

From 1902 to 1908, he was a city councillor for the Saint-Louis ward before his two years as mayor.
