= Joseph-Omer Asselin =

Joseph-Omer Asselin (1890–1961) was a Canadian businessman and politician, with significant influence in the politics of Montreal, Quebec.

== Personal life ==
Although eventually living in Westmount, he kept his original house in Bromptonville, Quebec, at which he ran a farm. The road on which the farm is located continues to be known as Chemin Asselin.

== Business experience ==
From 1919 to 1930, he was secretary-treasurer of Brompton Lumber and Manufacturing Company in Bromptonville, Quebec. He later became a banker, and eventually became director and vice-president of the Mercantile Bank of Canada.

== Municipal experience ==
From 1940 to 1960, he was an alderman on the Montreal City Council. He served as chairman of its executive committee from 1940 to 1954, and chairman of the Montreal Metropolitan Commission from 1941 to 1954, when Adhémar Raynault, and then Camillien Houde, was Mayor of Montreal.

Political offices
Preceded by Joseph-Marie Savignac	Chairman of the Executive Committee; 1940-1954	Succeeded by Pierre DesMarais (Civic Action League)
