= Édouard-Charles Fabre =

Catholic archbishop

- Archbishop of Montreal
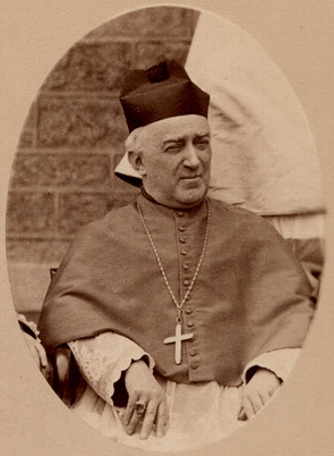
- See: Montreal
- Installed: May 11, 1876
- Term ended: December 30, 1896
- Predecessor: Ignace Bourget
- Successor: Paul Bruchési
- Other post: Coadjutor Bishop of Montreal

Orders
- Ordination: February 23, 1850

Personal details
- Born: February 28, 1827 Montreal, Lower Canada
- Died: December 30, 1896 (aged 69) Montreal, Quebec
- Parents: Édouard-Raymond Fabre
- Coat of arms

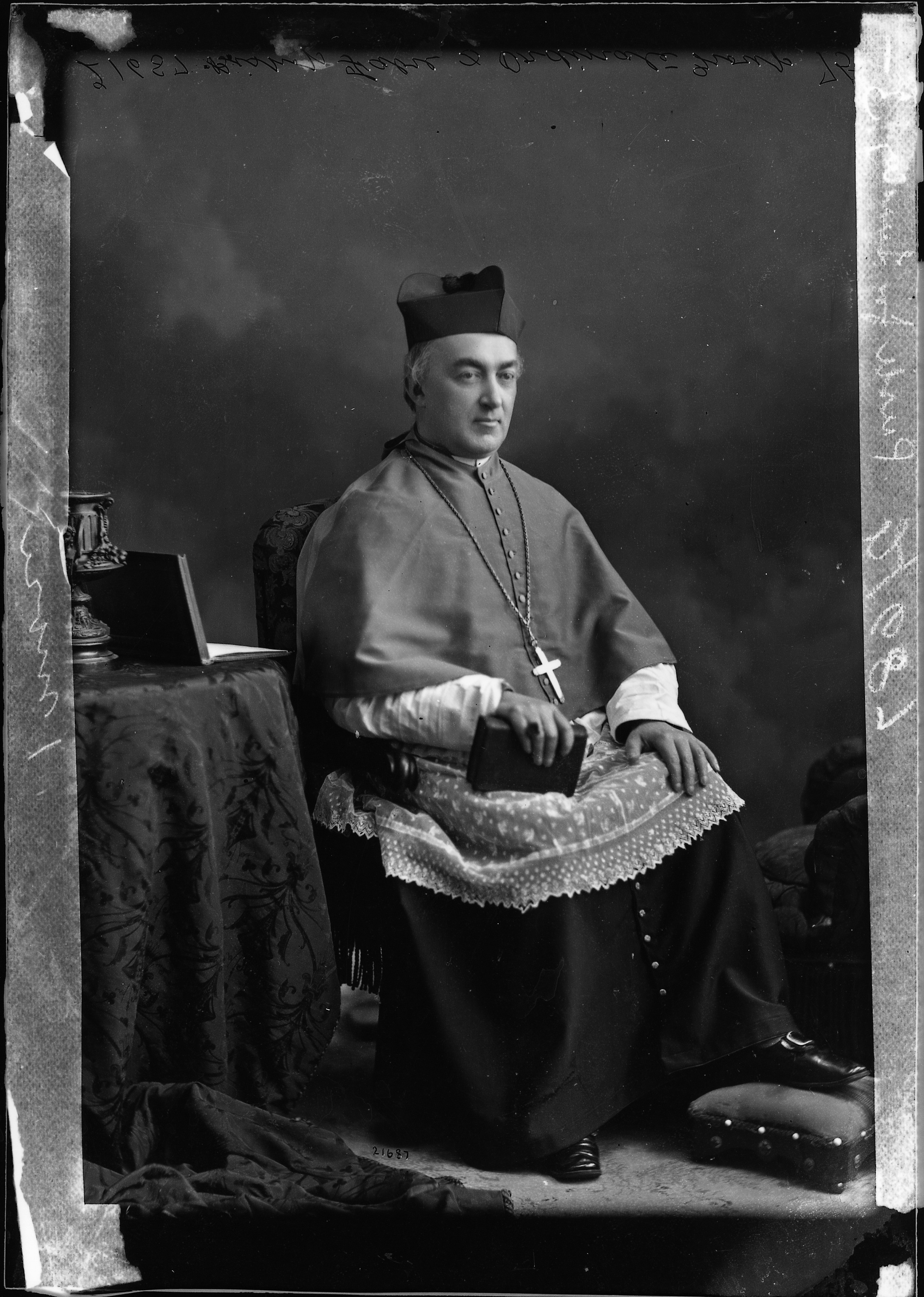
Bishop Édouard-Charles Fabre taken in Montreal in 1875 at William Notman's studio.

Édouard-Charles Fabre (French pronunciation: [edwaʁ ʃaʁl fabʁ]; February 28, 1827 – December 30, 1896) was Bishop of Montréal in 1876 and first Archbishop of Montreal in 1886.

== Life ==
Fabre was the eldest of 11 children in an important Montreal business family. His father Édouard-Raymond Fabre was a bookseller and mayor of Montreal from 1849 to 1851, his mother, Luce Perrault, was involved in social work, charitable institutions, and home visits for the poor. His sister Hortense later married the lawyer and politician George-Étienne Cartier.

Fabre completed his classical studies at the Séminaire de Saint-Hyacinthe in 1843. His father opposed his desire to become a priest and took the sixteen-year-old to live in Paris with his paternal aunt Julie so that the boy might see something of the world. She was married to the elder Fabre's business partner, Hector Bossange. Eventually, his father agreed that Édouard-Charles could study philosophy and theology at the seminary of Saint-Sulpice at Issy-les-Moulineaux.

In 1846 Fabre finished his studies at Saint-Sulpice, visited Rome and met Pope Pius IX. He returned to Montreal and resumed his theological studies at the episcopal palace under Jean-Charles Prince, coadjutor bishop of Montreal. After his ordination on 23 January 1850 at Saint-Jacques Cathedral, he was appointed assistant pastor in Sorel. Two year later, he was named parish priest at Saint-Joachim de la Pointe Claire. In 1855, he was installed as titular canon of the Cathedral.

=== Bishop ===
On April 1, 1873, Rome appointed him coadjutor of Bishop Bourget. He received his episcopal consecration at the Church of the Gesù (Montreal). Upon Bourget's resignation for health reasons, in 1876 Fabre became the third bishop of Montreal. He managed to put diocesan finances back on a sound basis. In 1886, Pope Leo XIII made him Archbishop of Montreal. The Diocese of Sherbrooke and that of Saint-Hyacinthe were made suffragan to Montreal.

In 1882 he supported the establishment of a diocesan newspaper, La Semaine religieuse de Montréal. Fabre held very conservative views, but was also a pragmatist. During a smallpox epidemic in 1885 he directed his priests to reassure their parishioners about vaccines and not to interfere with the doctors.

Archbishop Édouard-Charles Fabre died on December 30, 1896, in his episcopal residence at the age of 69.

The parish municipality of Saint-Édouard-de-Fabre, Quebec, was named after him. The Montreal metro station Fabre is named after the street which is named after him.
