= Joseph Bourret =

Mayor Joseph Bourret
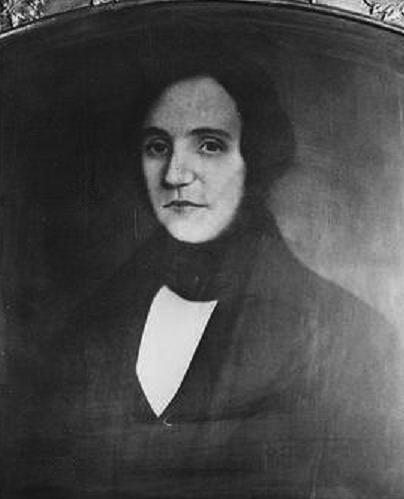

3rd Mayor of Montreal
- In office 1842–1844
- Preceded by: Peter McGill
- Succeeded by: James Ferrier
- Constituency: Centre
- In office 1847–1849
- Preceded by: John Easton Mills
- Succeeded by: Édouard-Raymond Fabre
- Constituency: St. Antoine

Personal details
- Born: 10 June 1802 Rivière-du-Loup, Lower Canada
- Died: 5 March 1859 (aged 56) Montreal, Lower Canada
- Spouse(s): Émélie Pelletier; Marie-Stéphanie Bédard
- Profession: lawyer, banker

Joseph Bourret (10 June 1802 – 5 March 1859) was a 19th-century Canadian lawyer, banker and politician.

Bourret was educated at the Classical College at Nicolet, Quebec. After clerking for three years for his uncle, Bourret was admitted to the bar in 1823. He practiced law at his uncle's office for ten years. When his uncle died, he entered into a partnership with a well known lawyer, Toussaint Pelletier.

He was appointed to the city council by the colonial government in 1840. He was elected councilor for the Centre Quarter in 1842 and the Quartier St. Antoine from 1846 until 1852. (At that time, municipal politicians often served in the provincial legislature). Bourret was the third (1842–1844) and sixth (1847–1849) mayor of Montreal, Quebec, and served as minister of public works in the Lafontaine-Baldwin government. Bourret also served on the legislative council of Canada from 1848 until his death in 1859.

Bourret was supported by Louis-Hippolyte Lafontaine because as a moderate, he was acceptable to the rich Anglo-Saxons who formed the majority of the Montreal electorate. While Lafontaine and Bourret supported responsible government, they provided a more moderate option than the radicals that led the Rebellions of 1837.

Bourret also worked to preserve the French-Canadian identity. In 1843, he and Ludger Duvernay restored the mutual aid organization that became the Saint-Jean-Baptiste Society. He later served as the fifth president (1848–1849). He was also a co-founder of one of French Canada's earliest financial institutions, Banque d’Épargne de la Cité et du District de Montréal. The bank was established to serve working-class Quebecers and had the strong support of the Roman Catholic Church.

During his time as mayor, Montreal was the capital of the Province of Canada (see Union of Upper and Lower Canada). Therefore, Bourret bestowed the Saint Anne Market Building to the Parliament of the Canadas. Bourret was instrumental in the construction of the Bonsecours Market and the aqueducts into Montreal. He became an advocate for a safe water system after a cholera outbreak during his second term as mayor.

== Personal life ==
Bourret was born in Rivière-du-Loup, Quebec on 10 June 1802 to farmer Joseph Bourret and Angélique Lemaître-Bellenoix. He married Emélie Pelletier, daughter of Toussaint Pelletier and Elisabeth Lacoste, in 1834. Then in 1839, he married Marie-Stéphanie Bédard, daughter of the lawyer Joseph Bédard and of Marie-Geneviève-Scholastique Hubert-Lacroix. The couple had nine children. Bourret died while working on 5 March 1859 at the age of 56. Funeral services were held in Notre-Dame Basilica. Bourret Avenue in Côte-des-Neiges was named in his honour.
