= Le drapeau belge =

Composition written by Edward Elgar

The flag of Belgium

Le drapeau belge (French pronunciation: [lə dʁapo bɛlʒ], "The Belgian Flag") is a recitation with orchestral accompaniment written by the English composer Edward Elgar as his Op. 79, in 1917. The words are by the Belgian poet Émile Cammaerts. The poem reflects on the wartime meaning of the colours of the Belgian flag.

It was first performed at the birthday concert for King Albert I in the Queen's Hall, London, on 14 April 1917, with the recitation by Belgian dramatic performer Carlo Liten, and the orchestra conducted by Hamilton Harty.

On 15 August 1918, Le drapeau belge and Carillon were performed with success at a popular concert in Prospect Park, Brooklyn, with the recitations by Carlo Liten.

== Lyrics ==
The original words were in French, and an English translation was provided by Lord Curzon of Kedleston.

Français LE DRAPEAU BELGE 1. Rouge pour le sang des soldats, Noir, jaune et rouge -; Noir pour les larmes des mères, Noir, jaune et rouge -; Et jaune pour la lumière Et l'ardeur des prochains combats. Au drapeau, mes enfants, La patrie vous appelle, Au drapeau, serrons les rangs, Ceux qui meurent, vivent pour elle! 2. Rouge pour la pourpre héroïque, Noir, jaune et rouge -; Noir pour le voile des veuves, Noir, jaune et rouge -; Jaune pour l'orgueil épique, Et le triomphe après l'épreuve. Au drapeau, au drapeau, La patrie vous appelle, Il n'a jamais flotté si haut, Elle n'a jamais été si belle! 3. Rouge pour la rage des flammes, Noir, jaune et rouge -; Noir pour la cendre des deuils, Noir, jaune et rouge -; Et jaune pour le salut de l'âme Et l'or fauve de notre orgueil. Au drapeau, mes enfants, La patrie vous bénit. Il n'a jamais été si grande Que depuis qu'il est petit, Que depuis qu'il brave la mort.	English THE BELGIAN FLAG 1. Red for the blood of soldiers, Black, yellow and red -; Black for the tears of mothers, Black, yellow and red -; And yellow for the light and flame Of the fields where the blood is shed! To the glorious flag, my children, Hark! the call your country gives, To the flag in serried order! He who dies for Belgium lives! 2. Red for the purple of heroes, Black, yellow and red -; Black for the veils of widows, Black, yellow and red -; Yellow for the shining crown Of the victors who have bled! To the flag, the flag, my children, Hearken to your country's cry! Never has it shone so splendid, Never has if flown so high! 3. Red for the flames in fury, Black, yellow and red -; Black for the mourning ashes, Black, yellow and red -; And yellow of gold, as we proudly hail The spirits of the dead! To the flag, my sons! Your country with her blessing "Forward" cries! Has it shrunken? No, when smallest, Larger, statelier it flies! Is it tattered? No, 'tis stoutest When destruction it defies!

== Recordings ==
- Elgar: War Music Richard Pascoe (narrator), Barry Collett (conductor), Rutland Sinfonia
