= Yvon Lamarre =

Canadian politician (1935–2020)

Yvon Lamarre (2 February 1935 – 2 June 2020) was a Canadian politician and a City Councillor in Montreal, Quebec.

Lamarre was born and brought up in the Cote St. Paul district of Montreal. He graduated from the École des Hautes Études commerciales at the Université de Montréal in 1957. He worked in the family business "Lamarre Frères Inc".

== City Councillor ==
He was elected to Montreal's City Council in 1966 as a Civic candidate against independent incumbent Bruno Lépine in the district of Saint-Henri. He was appointed to the City Council's executive committee in 1970, becoming the vice-chairman in 1974 and the chairman in 1978.

== Chairman of the Executive Council ==
Lamarre served as Chairman of Montreal's Executive Committee from 1978 to 1986. In 1982 he was considered as a possibility to replace Jean Drapeau when the mayor had a mild stroke. Lamarre was re-elected to the Council in 1982 in the district of Saint-Paul, but did not run for re-election in 1986. He was succeeded by Montreal Citizens' Movement (RCM) member Jean Durivage on the City Council.. Lamarre cited as his greatest achievement a city housing project launched in 1979. He subsequently pursued his interest in housing through the 1985 creation of Fondation Yvon Lamarre, which provides adapted residences for those with intellectual impairments.

== Footnotes ==
Political offices
Preceded by Gérard Niding (Civic Party)	Chairman of the Executive Committee; 1978-1986	Succeeded by Michael Fainstat (RCM)
