= Civic Action League =

Civic Action League Ligue d'Action Civique
- Former municipal party
- Leader: Jean Drapeau
- President: Pierre DesMarais
- Founded: January 1951
- Dissolved: 1961

The Civic Action League (French: Ligue d'Action Civique or LAC) was a municipal political party in Montreal, Quebec, Canada. It existed from 1951 to 1961.

== Origins ==
It was established in January 1951 by good government activists who were known as the Public Morality Committee.

== Accomplishments ==
The party managed to elect a plurality of the city councillors in 1954 and its candidate Jean Drapeau became Mayor. However the majority of the City Council was made up of Independents and often blocked legislation proposed by the League.

Nonetheless, the League introduced party politics in Montreal's city government and abolished council seats reserved for businesses, city associations and agencies.

== Decline ==
Drapeau lost his bid for re-election in 1957. In the subsequent years, the party was plagued by conflicts between Drapeau and former Executive Committee Chairman Pierre DesMarais. In September 1960, Drapeau led 17 of the League's 33 councillors into the Civic Party of Montreal. By October 1960, the League was wiped off the political map.

== Mayoral Candidates ==
| Election | Mayoral Candidate | Popular Vote for Mayor | Number of Councillors |
|---|---|---|---|
| **1954** | **Jean Drapeau** | **50%** | **28/99** |
| 1957 | Jean Drapeau | 49% | **33/99** |
| 1960 | Lucien Tremblay | 6% | 0/66 |

Victories are indicated in bold.
