= James Ferrier (politician) =

Former mayor of Montreal, Quebec

The Honourable James Ferrier
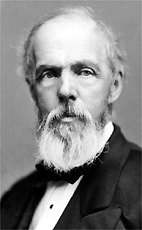

4th Mayor of Montreal
- In office 1844–1846
- Preceded by: Joseph Bourret
- Succeeded by: John Easton Mills

Member of the Legislative Council of the Province of Canada for Victoria
- In office 1847–1867

Member of the Legislative Council of Quebec for Victoria
- In office 1867–1888
- Succeeded by: Hugh Mackay

Canadian Senator from Quebec
- In office 1867–1888
- Appointed by: Royal Proclamation
- Succeeded by: Hippolyte Montplaisir

Personal details
- Born: 22 October 1800 Auchtermuchty, Fife, Scotland
- Died: 30 May 1888 (aged 87) Montreal, Quebec, Canada
- Profession: Politician; merchant

James Ferrier (22 October 1800 – 30 May 1888) was a Scottish-Canadian politician.

== Life and career ==
Born in Auchtermuchty, Fife, Scotland, Ferrier migrated to Canada in 1821 and established himself in Montreal, Quebec, as a successful Scots-Quebecer merchant. He served as a city councillor of Montreal from 1841 to 1848.

In 1842, Ferrier took the lead in establishing the High School of Montreal, supported by William Lunn, William Collis Meredith, the Rev. Henry Esson, and others, one of their purposes being to provide a solution to the growing influence of Anglicanism in education at the time. The new school opened in 1843.

Ferrier became the fourth mayor of Montreal, holding office from 1844 to 1847. He served on the Legislative Council of the Province of Canada from 1847 until Confederation, after which he was appointed to the Senate of Canada by Royal Proclamation on 23 October 1867. He sat with the Conservative group and represented the Senatorial Division of Shawinegan until his death in 1888. From 1867 until his death he also served on the Legislative Council of Quebec, sitting for the division of Victoria.

Ferrier was chancellor of McGill University from 1884 to 1888. He is commemorated by Ferrier Street in northwestern Côte-des-Neiges, Montreal.

== Notes ==
Academic offices
Preceded by Charles Dewey Day	Chancellor of McGill University; 1884–1888	Succeeded by Lord Strathcona
