= Lucien Saulnier =

Canadian politician (1916–1989)

Montreal City Council
- In office 1954–1972

Chair of the Montreal Executive Committee
- In office 1960–1969

Personal details
- Born: July 25, 1916 Montreal, Quebec
- Died: June 22, 1989 (aged 72)
- Party: Civic Party of Montreal
- Awards: Order of Canada

Lucien Saulnier, CC (July 25, 1916 – June 22, 1989) was a Canadian politician. He was chair of the Montreal Urban Community during the October Crisis. He was also chairman and chief executive officer of the Société de développement industriel du Québec.

Saulnier was elected to the Montreal City Council in 1954, working with the Ligue d'Action Civique. In 1960, he co-founded Montreal's Civic Party with Jean Drapeau. From 1960 to 1969, Saulnier was the chair of the executive committee and was head of the Montreal Urban Community. Following the award of Expo 67 to Montreal, Saulnier pushed for the construction of the Yellow Line to serve the site.

In 1972, he left politics and held positions with public agencies including Hydro-Québec.

In 1971 he was made a Companion of the Order of Canada "for services rendered as an administrator".

Political offices
Preceded by Joseph-Marie Savignac	Chairman of the Executive Committee; 1960-1970	Succeeded by Gérard Niding (Civic Party)
