= Pierre DesMarais =

Canadian politician

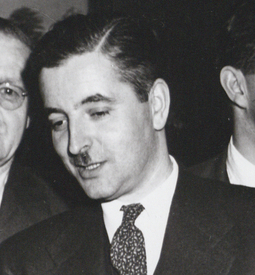

Chair of the Montreal Executive Committee
- In office 1954–1957
- Preceded by: J.-Omer Asselin
- Succeeded by: Joseph-Marie Savignac

Member of the Montreal City Council
- In office 1940–1950

Personal details
- Party: Civic Action League

Pierre DesMarais was a Canadian politician who served as a member of the Montreal City Council from 1940 to 1950.

== Career ==
DesMarais ran for a seat on the Montreal City Council in 1940 and won. He was re-elected in 1942, 1944 and 1947, but did not run for re-election in 1950.

He co-founded the Civic Action League in 1951, with other good government activists who were known as the Public Morality Committee. He was re-elected in 1954 and 1957. He served as chairman of the Montreal Executive Committee during Drapeau's first term as mayor from 1954 to 1957.

In 1960, he lost the support of Jean Drapeau who founded the Civic Party of Montreal and lost his bid for re-election. He also was defeated in the district of Saint-Jacques in 1962.
