= Georges Gauthier =

French Canadian archbishop

- Archbishop of Montreal
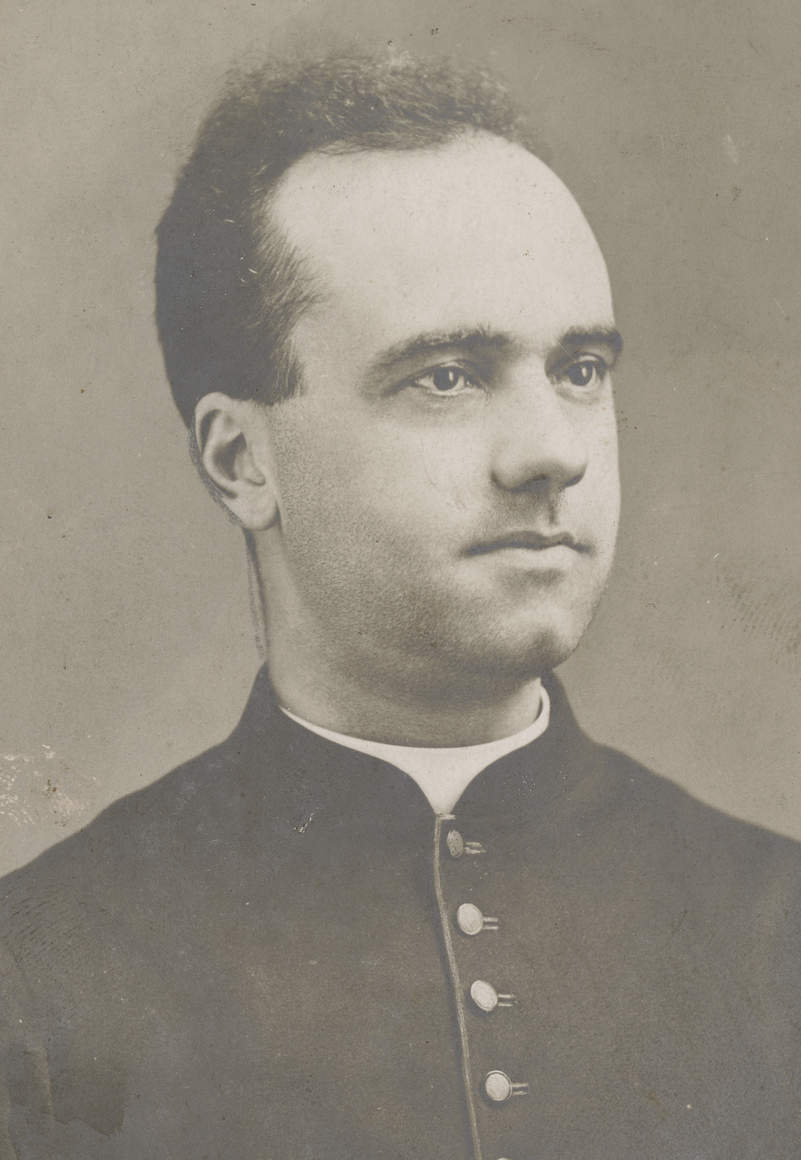
- Archdiocese: Montreal
- Installed: 1939
- Term ended: 1940
- Predecessor: Paul Bruchési
- Successor: Joseph Charbonneau

Personal details
- Born: 9 October 1871 Montreal, Quebec
- Died: 31 August 1940 (aged 68)
- Coat of arms

Georges Gauthier (9 October 1871 – 31 August 1940) was a French Canadian archbishop of Montreal and the first rector of the Université de Montréal.

== Biography ==
Born in Montreal, Quebec, the son of François-Xavier Gauthier and Marie Généreux, he was ordained a priest in 1894 and ordained a bishop in 1912. On 20 September 1939, he was appointed the third archbishop of Montreal and served until his death in 1940.

In 1917, he was appointed vice-rector of the Université Laval à Montréal and when it became an independent school in 1920 he served as the first rector until 1923.

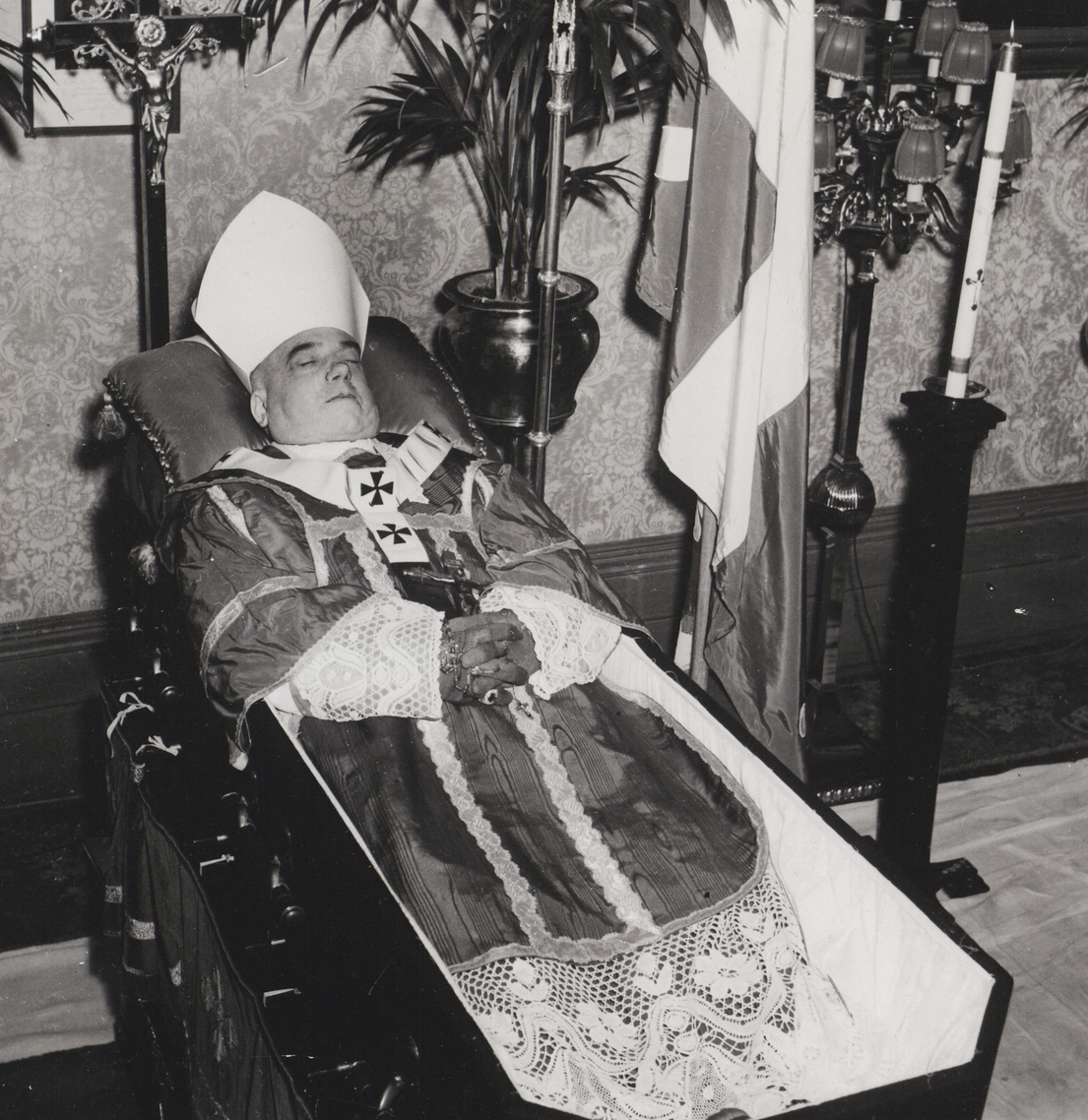

Academic offices
New office	Recteur de l'Université de Montréal; 1920 – 1923	Succeeded by André-Vincent-Joseph Piette
Religious titles
Preceded by Paul Bruchési	Archbishop of Montreal; 1939 – 1940	Succeeded by Joseph Charbonneau
