= 2005 Montreal municipal election =

Election in Quebec, Canada

- November 6, 2005

65 seats in Montreal City Council
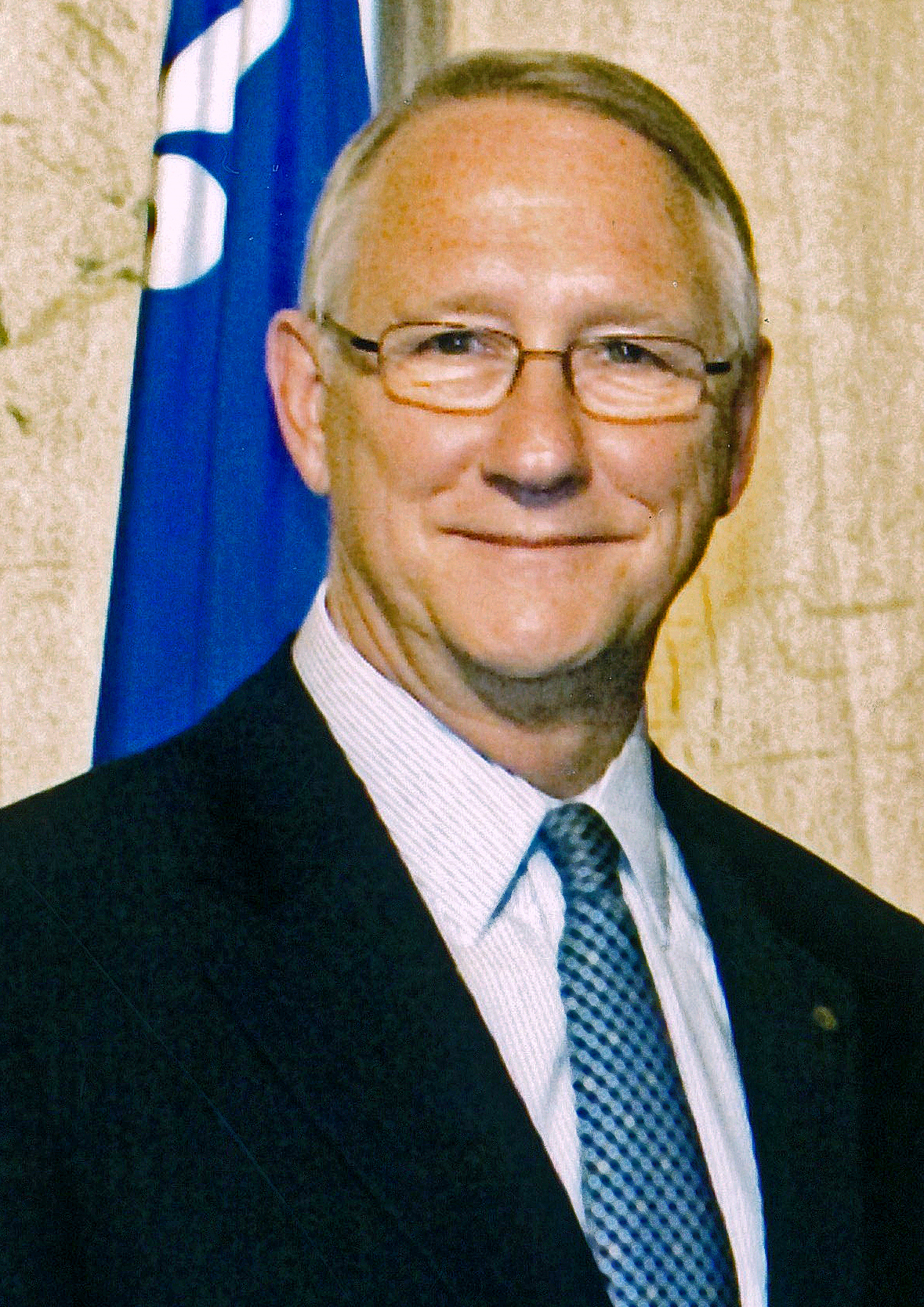

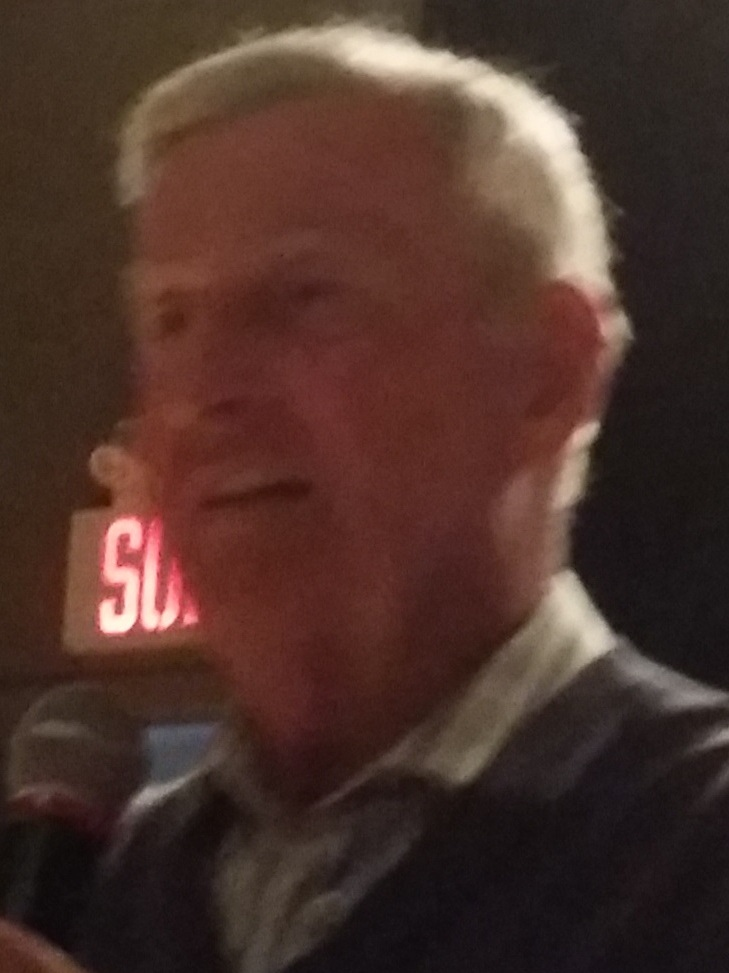

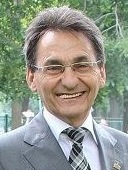
	First party	Second party	Third party
Leader	Gérald Tremblay	Pierre Bourque	Richard Bergeron
Party	Citizens Union	Vision Montreal	Projet Montréal
Leader since	2001	2003	May 28, 2004
Leader's seat	Mayor	Marie-Victorin	DeLorimier
Last election	40 seats, 50.37%	31 seats, 45.14%	pre-creation
Seats won	47	14	1
Seat change	▲7	▼17
Popular vote	202,302	136,769	32,126
Percentage	53.74%	36.33%	8.53%
Swing	+3.37%	-8.81%
Mayor before election
Gérald Tremblay
Citizens Union
Elected mayor
Gérald Tremblay
Citizens Union

The 2005 Montreal municipal election was held on Tuesday November 6, to elect a city mayor, borough mayors, city councillors, and borough councillors in Montreal, Quebec, Canada. In the contest for mayor of Montreal, Gérald Tremblay was elected to a second term over former mayor Pierre Bourque.

== Results ==
=== City mayor ===
2005 Montreal municipal election: Mayor of Montreal
Party	Candidate	Votes	%
Montreal Island Citizens Union	(x)Gérald Tremblay	202,302	53.73
Vision Montreal	Pierre Bourque	136,769	36.32
Projet Montréal	Richard Bergeron	32,126	8.53
White Elephant Party	Michel Bédard	5,329	1.42
Total valid votes		376,526	100

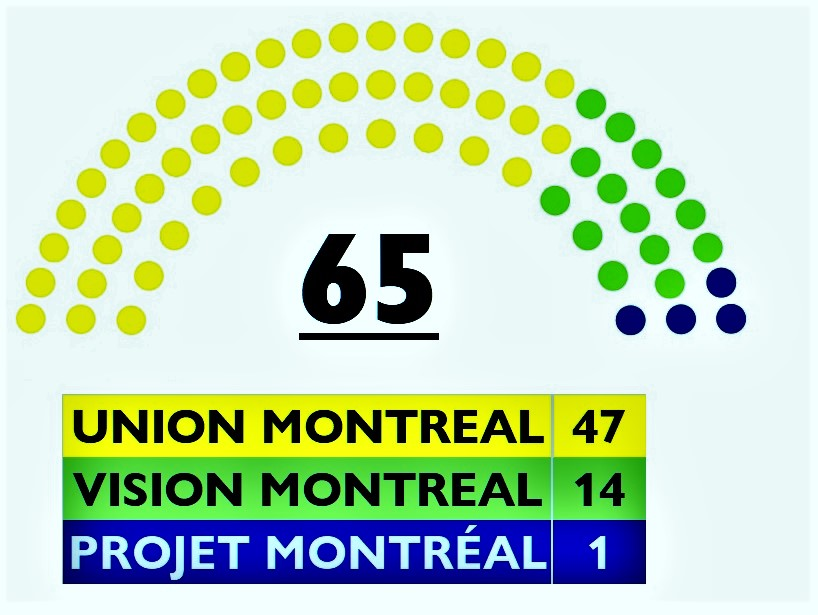
Montreal council after the 2005 municipal elections.

=== Borough mayors ===
Borough	Elected Candidate	Party
Ahuntsic-Cartierville	Marie-Andrée Beaudoin	MICU
Anjou	Luis Miranda (inc.)	Équipe Anjou
Côte-des-Neiges—Notre-Dame-de-Grâce	Michael Applebaum (inc.)	MICU
Lachine	Claude Dauphin (inc.)	MICU
LaSalle	Manon Barbe (inc.)	MICU
L'Île-Bizard–Sainte-Geneviève	Richard Bélanger	MICU
Mercier–Hochelaga-Maisonneuve	Lyn Thériault Faust	VM
Montreal North	Marcel Parent (inc.)	MICU
Outremont	Stéphane Harbour (inc.)	MICU
Pierrefonds—Roxboro	Monique Worth (inc.)	MICU
Le Plateau-Mont-Royal	Helen Fotopulos (inc.)	MICU
Rivière-des-Prairies–Pointe-aux-Trembles	Cosmo Maciocia (inc.)	MICU
Rosemont—La Petite-Patrie	André Lavallée	MICU
Saint-Laurent	Alan Desousa (inc.)	MICU
Saint Leonard	Frank Zampino (inc.)	MICU
Le Sud-Ouest	Jacqueline Montpetit (inc.)	MICU
Verdun	Claude Trudel	MICU
Ville-Marie	Benoit Labonté	MICU
Villeray–Saint-Michel–Parc-Extension	Anie Samson	VM

=== Composition of city and borough councils ===
Depending on their borough, Montrealers voted for:

- Mayor of Montreal
- Borough mayor, who is also a city councillor
- A city councillor for the whole borough or for each district, who is also a borough councillor (Outremont and L'Île-Bizard–Sainte-Geneviève have no city councillors other than the borough mayor)
- Zero, one, or two additional borough councillors for each district

Borough	District	Borough Councillors			
Borough	District	City Councillors		Borough Councillor	Borough Councillor
Borough	District	Borough Mayor	City Councillor	Borough Councillor	Borough Councillor
Ahuntsic-Cartierville	Ahuntsic	Marie-Andrée Beaudoin	Pierre Lapointe		
Ahuntsic-Cartierville	Bordeaux-Cartierville	Marie-Andrée Beaudoin	Noushig Eloyan		
Ahuntsic-Cartierville	Saint-Sulpice	Marie-Andrée Beaudoin	Jocelyn Ann Campbell		
Ahuntsic-Cartierville	Sault-au-Récollet	Marie-Andrée Beaudoin	Jean-François St-Onge		
Anjou	Centre	Luis Miranda	Andrée Hénault	Michelle Zammit	
Anjou	East	Luis Miranda	Andrée Hénault	Rémy Tondreau	
Anjou	West	Luis Miranda	Andrée Hénault	Gilles Beaudry	
Côte-des-Neiges– Notre-Dame-de-Grâce	Côte-des-Neiges	Michael Appelbaum	Francine Senecal		
Côte-des-Neiges– Notre-Dame-de-Grâce	Darlington	Michael Appelbaum	Saulie Zajdel		
Côte-des-Neiges– Notre-Dame-de-Grâce	Loyola	Michael Appelbaum	Warren Allmand		
Côte-des-Neiges– Notre-Dame-de-Grâce	Notre-Dame-de-Grâce	Michael Appelbaum	Marcel Tremblay		
Côte-des-Neiges– Notre-Dame-de-Grâce	Snowdon	Michael Appelbaum	Marvin Rotrand		
L'Île-Bizard– Sainte-Geneviève	Denis-Benjamin-Viger	Richard Bélanger		Christopher Little	
L'Île-Bizard– Sainte-Geneviève	Jacques-Bizard	Richard Bélanger		François Robert	
L'Île-Bizard– Sainte-Geneviève	Pierre-Foretier	Richard Bélanger		Diane Gibb	
L'Île-Bizard– Sainte-Geneviève	Sainte-Geneviève	Richard Bélanger		Philippe Voisard	
Lachine	Du Canal	Claude Dauphin	Jane Cowell-Poitras	Elizabeth Verge	
Lachine	Fort-Rolland	Claude Dauphin	Jane Cowell-Poitras	Jean-François Cloutier	
Lachine	J.-Émery-Provost	Claude Dauphin	Jane Cowell-Poitras	Bernard Blanchet	
LaSalle	Cecil-P.-Newman	Manon Barbe	Alvaro Farinacci	Vincenzo Cesari	Lise Zarac
LaSalle	Sault-Saint-Louis	Manon Barbe	Richard Deschamps	Ross Blackhurst	Laura-Ann Palestini
Mercier– Hochelaga-Maisonneuve	Hochelaga	Lyn Thériault Faust	Laurent Blanchard		
Mercier– Hochelaga-Maisonneuve	Louis-Riel	Lyn Thériault Faust	Richer Dompierre		
Mercier– Hochelaga-Maisonneuve	Maisonneuve–Longue-Pointe	Lyn Thériault Faust	Claire St-Arnaud		
Mercier– Hochelaga-Maisonneuve	Tétreaultville	Lyn Thériault Faust	Gaëtan Primeau		
Montréal-Nord	Marie-Clarac	Marcel Parent	James V. Infantino	Clementina Teti-Tomassi	
Montréal-Nord	Ovide-Clermont	Marcel Parent	Jean-Marc Gibeau	Normand Fortin	
Outremont	Claude-Ryan	Stéphane Harbour		Louis Moffatt	
Outremont	Jeanne-Sauvé	Stéphane Harbour		Ana Nunes	
Outremont	Joseph-Beaubien	Stéphane Harbour		Claude B. Piquette	
Outremont	Robert-Bourassa	Stéphane Harbour		Marie Cinq-Mars	
Pierrefonds-Roxboro	East	Monique Worth	Christian Dubois	Roger Trottier	
Pierrefonds-Roxboro	West	Monique Worth	Bertrand Ward	Catherine Clément-Talbot	
Le Plateau-Mont-Royal	DeLorimier	Helen Fotopulos	Richard Bergeron	Josée Duplessis	
Le Plateau-Mont-Royal	Jeanne-Mance	Helen Fotopulos	Michel Prescott	Isabel Dos Santos	
Le Plateau-Mont-Royal	Mile-End	Helen Fotopulos	Michel Labrecque	Eleni Fakotakis-Kolaitis	
Rivière-des-Prairies– Pointe-aux-Trembles	La Pointe-aux-Prairies	Cosmo Maciocia	Nicolas Montmorency	Joseph Di Pietro	
Rivière-des-Prairies– Pointe-aux-Trembles	Pointe-aux-Trembles	Cosmo Maciocia	André Bélisle	Suzanne Décarie	
Rivière-des-Prairies– Pointe-aux-Trembles	Rivière-des-Prairies	Cosmo Maciocia	Joe Magri	Maria Calderone	
Rosemont– La Petite-Patrie	Étienne-Desmarteau	André Lavallée	Carole Du Sault		
Rosemont– La Petite-Patrie	Marie-Victorin	André Lavallée	Pierre Bourque		
Rosemont– La Petite-Patrie	Saint-Édouard	André Lavallée	François Purcell		
Rosemont– La Petite-Patrie	Vieux-Rosemont	André Lavallée	Gilles Grondin		
Saint-Laurent	Côte-de-Liesse	Alan DeSousa	Laval Demers	Maurice Cohen	
Saint-Laurent	Norman-McLaren	Alan DeSousa	Patricia Bittar	Michèle Biron	
Saint-Léonard	Saint-Léonard-Est	Frank Zampino	Yvette Bissonnet	Robert Zambito	
Saint-Léonard	Saint-Léonard-Ouest	Frank Zampino	Dominic Perri	Mario Battista	
Le Sud-Ouest	Saint-Henri–Petite-Bourgogne– Pointe-Saint-Charles	Jacqueline Montpetit	Line Hamel	Pierre E. Fréchette	
Le Sud-Ouest	Saint-Paul–Émard	Jacqueline Montpetit	Jean-Yves Cartier	Ronald Bossy	
Verdun	Champlain–L'Île-des-Sœurs	Claude Trudel	Ginette Marotte	Paul Beaupré	Marc Touchette
Verdun	Desmarchais-Crawford	Claude Trudel	Alain Tassé	Josée Lavigueur Thériault	André Savard
Ville-Marie	Peter-McGill	Benoît Labonté	Catherine Sévigny	Karim Boulos	
Ville-Marie	Sainte-Marie–Saint-Jacques	Benoît Labonté	Sammy Forcillo	Pierre Mainville	
Villeray–Saint-Michel– Parc-Extension	François-Perrault	Anie Samson	Frank Venneri		
Villeray–Saint-Michel– Parc-Extension	Parc-Extension	Anie Samson	Mary Deros		
Villeray–Saint-Michel– Parc-Extension	Saint-Michel	Anie Samson	Soraya Martinez		
Villeray–Saint-Michel– Parc-Extension	Villeray	Anie Samson	Sylvain Lachance		

== Seat-by-seat results ==
=== Ahuntsic-Cartierville ===
Electoral District	Position	Total valid votes	Candidates				Incumbent
Electoral District	Position	Total valid votes	Projet Montréal	MICU	Vision Montréal	Independent	Incumbent
—	Borough mayor	33,091	Yves Laporte; 3,891 (11.76%)	Marie-Andrée Beaudoin; 16,411 (49.59%)	Maurice Beauchamp; 12,789 (38.65%)		Noushig Eloyan
Ahuntsic	City councillor	8,913	Pierre-Léo Mongeon-Bourbonnais; 1,329 (14.91%)	Pierre Lapointe; 3,956 (44.38%)	Hasmig Belleli; 3,628 (40.70%)		Pierre Lapointe
Bordeaux-Cartierville	City councillor	8,366	Annik Collin; 582 (6.96%)	James Kromida; 3,648 (43.61%)	Noushig Eloyan; 4,136 (49.44%)		Hasmig Belleli (L'Acadie)
Bordeaux-Cartierville	City councillor	8,366	Annik Collin; 582 (6.96%)	James Kromida; 3,648 (43.61%)	Noushig Eloyan; 4,136 (49.44%)		Merged district
Bordeaux-Cartierville	City councillor	8,366	Annik Collin; 582 (6.96%)	James Kromida; 3,648 (43.61%)	Noushig Eloyan; 4,136 (49.44%)		Noushig Eloyan (Cartierville)
Saint-Sulpice	City councillor	7,694	Pascal Côté; 1,200 (15.60%)	Jocelyn Ann Campbell; 3,400 (44.19%)	Alain André; 3,094 (40.21%)		Maurice Beauchamp
Sault-au-Récollet	City councillor	8,681	Marie-Pier Léger-St-Jean; 1,106 (12.74%)	Jean-François St-Onge; 4,037 (46.50%)	Achille Polcaro; 3,322 (38.27%)	Jean-Jacques Milot Jean-Louis; 216 (2.49%)	Achille Polcaro

=== Anjou ===
Electoral District	Position	Total valid votes	Candidates					Incumbent
Electoral District	Position	Total valid votes	Projet Montréal	MICU	Vision Montréal	Équipe Anjou	White Elephant	Incumbent
—	Borough mayor	13,420	Gilles Rhéaume; 317 (2.36%)	Carol Beaupré; 3,817 (28.44%)	Rémi Arsenault; 1,552 (11.56%)	Luis Miranda; 7,734 (57.63%)		Luis Miranda
—	City councillor	13,355		Paul-Yvon Perron; 3,920 (29.35%)	André Allard; 1,899 (14.22%)	Andrée Hénault; 7,273 (54.46%)	Gilles Bédard; 263 (1.97%)	Carol Beaupré
Centre	Borough councillor	4,173	Eric Richardson; 154 (3.69%)	Hugues Gilbert; 1,209 (28.97%)	Joelle Manset; 566 (13.56%)	Michelle Zammit; 2,244 (53.77%)		Andrée Hénault
East	Borough councillor	4,010		Rachelle Tremblay; 1,622 (40.45%)	Léo Hamel; 616 (15.36%)	Rémy Tondreau; 1,772 (44.19%)		Andrée Hénault
West	Borough councillor	4,913		Pierre Leclaire; 1,512 (30.78%)	Sahar Hawili; 697 (14.19%)	Gilles Beaudry; 2,704 (55.04%)		Andrée Hénault

=== Côte-des-Neiges–Notre-Dame-de-Grâce ===
Electoral District	Position	Total valid votes	Candidates					Incumbent
Electoral District	Position	Total valid votes	Projet Montréal	MICU	Vision Montréal	Team Jeremy Searle	Other	Incumbent
—	Borough mayor	30,445		Michael Applebaum; 14,646 (48.11%)	Sonya Biddle; 8,013 (26.32%)	Jeremy Searle; 5,949 (19.54%)	Alexandre Montagano (Ind.) 1,837 (6.03%)	Michael Applebaum
Côte-des-Neiges	City councillor	5,309	Magda Popeanu; 857 (16.14%)	Francine Senécal; 2,802 (52.78%)	Pierre-Yves Melançon; 1,202 (22.64%)	Marc Dupont; 374 (7.04%)	Kamman Saleh (ÉV-M); 74 (1.39%)	Francine Senécal
Darlington	City councillor	5,682	Trevor Hanna; 242 (4.26%)	Saulie Zajdel; 2,203 (38.77%)	Kashmir Singh Randhawa; 1,596 (28.09%)	Irwin Rapoport; 269 (4.73%)	Alex Robles (Ind.); 769 (13.53%); Francine Brodeur (ÉV-M); 603 (10.61%)	Saulie Zajdel
Loyola	City councillor	7,064		Warren Allmand; 3,949 (55.90%)	George Pentsos; 1,518 (21.49%)	Diana Tabatabai; 1,374 (19.45%)	Sergey Sterlikov (PÉBM); 223 (3.16%)	Warren Allmand
Notre-Dame-de-Grâce	City councillor	6,841	Jeff Itcush; 1,152 (16.84%)	Marcel Tremblay; 3,414 (49.90%)	Thomas Snabl; 907 (13.26%)	Robert Dupont; 1,368 (20.00%)		Michael Applebaum (Notre-Dame-de-Grâce)
Notre-Dame-de-Grâce	City councillor	6,841	Jeff Itcush; 1,152 (16.84%)	Marcel Tremblay; 3,414 (49.90%)	Thomas Snabl; 907 (13.26%)	Robert Dupont; 1,368 (20.00%)		Merged district
Notre-Dame-de-Grâce	City councillor	6,841	Jeff Itcush; 1,152 (16.84%)	Marcel Tremblay; 3,414 (49.90%)	Thomas Snabl; 907 (13.26%)	Robert Dupont; 1,368 (20.00%)		Marcel Tremblay (Décarie)
Snowdon	City councillor	5,791		Marvin Rotrand; 3,582 (61.85%)	Michelle Serano; 1,708 (29.49%)	Shireen Peyrow; 501 (8.65%)		Marvin Rotrand

=== L'Île-Bizard–Sainte-Geneviève ===
Electoral District	Position	Total valid votes	Candidates			Incumbent
Electoral District	Position	Total valid votes	Projet Montréal	MICU	Vision Montréal	Incumbent
—	Borough mayor	5,352	Amina Ouaqouaq; 176 (3.29%)	Richard Bélanger; 3,000 (56.05%)	Normand Marinacci; 2,176 (40.66%)	Jacques Cardinal (L'Île-Bizard– Sainte-Geneviève– Sainte-Anne-de-Bellevue)
Denis-Benjamin-Viger	Borough councillor	1,647		Christopher Little; 868 (52.70%)	Christian Larocque; 779 (47.30%)	New borough
Jacques-Bizard	Borough councillor	1,362		François Robert; 787 (57.78%)	Geoffrey Arscott; 575 (42.22%)	New borough
Pierre-Foretier	Borough councillor	1,637		Diane Gibb; 854 (52.17%)	Marie Bertrand; 783 (47.83%)	New borough
Sainte-Geneviève	Borough councillor	658		Philippe Voisard; 399 (60.64%)	Philippe Biron; 259 (39.36%)	New borough

=== Lachine ===
Electoral District	Position	Total valid votes	Candidates			Incumbent
Electoral District	Position	Total valid votes	MICU	Vision Montréal	Other	Incumbent
—	Borough mayor	10,762	Claude Dauphin; 8,633 (80.22%)	Jasson Finney; 2,129 (19.78%)		Claude Dauphin
—	City councillor	10,761	Jane Cowell-Poitras; 8,228 (76.46%)	Georges Bakopanos; 1,993 (18.52%)	Allan Remi Heafy (PÉBM); 540 (5.02%)	Jane Cowell-Poitras
Du Canal	Borough councillor	3,142	Elizabeth Verge; 2,432 (77.40%)	Houria Gaceb; 446 (14.19%)	Alice Grier (Ind.); 140 (4.46%); Jean Hainault (Ind.); 124 (3.95%)	Bernard Blanchet
Fort-Rolland	Borough councillor	4,411	Jean-François Cloutier; 2,530 (57.36%)	Maureen Maher; 422 (9.57%)	Mario Durante (Ind.); 1,459 (33.08%)	Bernard Blanchet
J.-Émery-Provost	Borough councillor	3,197	Bernard Blanchet; 2,460 (76.95%)	Antonio De Bordes; 737 (23.05%)		Bernard Blanchet

=== LaSalle ===
Electoral District	Position	Total valid votes	Candidates				Incumbent
Electoral District	Position	Total valid votes	Projet Montréal	MICU	Vision Montréal	Other	Incumbent
—	Borough mayor	18,412		Manon Barbe; 11,730 (63.71%)	Michael Vadacchino; 6,682 (36.29%)		Manon Barbe
Cecil-P.-Newman	City councillor	9,062		Alvaro Farinacci; 5,496 (60.65%)	Giovanni Baruffa; 3,035 (33.49%)	Daniel St-Hilaire (PÉBM); 531 (5.86%)	New position
Cecil-P.-Newman	Borough councillor I	8,946		Vincenzo Cesari; 5,523 (61.74%)	Mario Orlando; 3,423 (38.26%)		Michael Vadacchino
Cecil-P.-Newman	Borough councillor II	8,776		Lise Zarac; 5,526 (62.97%)	Sukhdev Singh; 3,250 (37.03%)		Michael Vadacchino
Sault-Saint-Louis	City councillor	9,380	Sergio Borja; 413 (4.40%)	Richard Deschamps; 5,646 (60.19%)	Gérald Larivière; 2,148 (22.90%)	Antonio Massana (Ind.); 993 (10.59%); François Dumoulin (PÉBM); 180 (1.92%)	New position
Sault-Saint-Louis	Borough councillor I	9,322	Malynda Vanloo; 580 (6.22%)	Ross Blackhurst; 5,929 (63.60%)	Cécile Duhamel; 2,813 (30.18%)		Oksana Kaluzny
Sault-Saint-Louis	Borough councillor II	9,238		Laura Palestini; 6,045 (65.44%)	Lise Furlatt; 3,193 (34.56%)		Oksana Kaluzny

=== Mercier–Hochelaga-Maisonneuve ===
Electoral District	Position	Total valid votes	Candidates			Incumbent
Electoral District	Position	Total valid votes	Projet Montréal	MICU	Vision Montréal	Incumbent
—	Borough mayor	31,472	Éric Alan Caldwell; 3,263 (10.37%)	Pierre Bélanger; 13,079 (41.56%)	Lyn Thériault Faust; 15,130 (48.07%)	Ivon Le Duc (Ind.)
Hochelaga	City councillor	6,193	José Feliciano Arias; 1,086 (17.54%)	Luc Larivée; 2,230 (36.01%)	Laurent Blanchard; 2,877 (46.46%)	Luc Larivée
Louis-Riel	City councillor	8,389	Daniel Archambault; 829 (9.88%)	Nicolas Tétrault; 3,755 (44.76%)	Richer Dompierre; 3,805 (45.36%)	Lyn Thériault Faust
Maisonneuve–Longue-Pointe	City councillor	7,704	Luce Beaulieu; 1,027 (13.33%)	Monique Comtois-Blanchet; 2,715 (35.24%)	Claire St-Arnaud; 3,962 (51.43%)	Richer Dompierre (Maisonneuve)
Maisonneuve–Longue-Pointe	City councillor	7,704	Luce Beaulieu; 1,027 (13.33%)	Monique Comtois-Blanchet; 2,715 (35.24%)	Claire St-Arnaud; 3,962 (51.43%)	Merged district
Maisonneuve–Longue-Pointe	City councillor	7,704	Luce Beaulieu; 1,027 (13.33%)	Monique Comtois-Blanchet; 2,715 (35.24%)	Claire St-Arnaud; 3,962 (51.43%)	Claire St-Arnaud (Longue-Pointe)
Tétreaultville	City councillor	9,335	Pascal Meilleur; 971 (10.40%)	Marcel Henry; 3,839 (41.12%)	Gaëtan Primeau; 4,525 (48.47%)	Ivon Le Duc (Ind.)

=== Montréal-Nord ===
Electoral District	Position	Total valid votes	Candidates				Incumbent
Electoral District	Position	Total valid votes	Projet Montréal	MICU	Vision Montréal	White Elephant	Incumbent
—	Borough mayor	16,019		Marcel Parent; 9,714 (60.64%)	Élaine Bissonnette; 6,305 (39.36%)		Marcel Parent
Marie-Clarac	City councillor	8,646	Monica Campo; 764 (8.84%)	James Infantino; 4,527 (52.36%)	Ibrahim Mustapha; 2,815 (32.56%)	Louis Langevin; 540 (6.25%)	New position
Marie-Clarac	Borough councillor	8,571	Robert La Rose; 751 (8.76%)	Clementina Teti-Tomassi; 4,379 (51.09%)	Diane St-Pierre; 3,441 (40.15%)		Georgette L. Morin
Ovide-Clermont	City councillor	7,529	Saïd Ghoulimi; 355 (4.72%)	Jean-Marc Gibeau; 4,397 (58.40%)	Roland Carrier; 2,466 (32.75%)	Mathieu Bélanger; 311 (4.13%)	New position
Ovide-Clermont	Borough councillor	7,489	Micheline Ciarlo; 508 (6.78%)	Normand Fortin; 4,401 (58.77%)	Justine Charlemagne; 2,580 (34.45%)		Normand Fortin

=== Outremont ===
Electoral District	Position	Total valid votes	Candidates				Incumbent
Electoral District	Position	Total valid votes	MICU	Vision Montréal	Oser Outremont	Other	Incumbent
—	Borough mayor	7,183	Stéphane Harbour; 5,135 (71.49%)	Frédérick Churchill; 740 (10.30%)	Christine Hernandez; 950 (13.23%)	Claude Gladu (Parti des citoyens d'Outremont); 358 (4.98%)	Stéphane Harbour
Claude-Ryan	Borough councillor	2,189	Louis Moffatt; 1,247 (56.97%)	Marc Vanier Vincent; 105 (4.80%)		Céline Forget (Ind.); 726 (33.17%); Jean-Marc Corbeil (Ind.); 111 (5.07%)	New position
Jeanne-Sauvé	Borough councillor	1,568	Ana Nunes; 1,247 (79.53%)	Jérôme Plantard; 321 (20.47%)			Claude B. Piquette
Joseph-Beaubien	Borough councillor	2,002	Claude B. Piquette; 1,308 (65.33%)	Debbie De Kochendoerffer; 270 (13.49%)	Paul-Guy Duhamel; 424 (21.18%)		Marie Cinq-Mars
Robert-Bourassa	Borough councillor	1,431	Marie Cinq-Mars; 1,207 (84.35%)	Olivier Trudeau; 224 (15.65%)			New position

=== Pierrefonds-Roxboro ===
Electoral District	Position	Total valid votes	Candidates				Incumbent
Electoral District	Position	Total valid votes	Projet Montréal	MICU	Vision Montréal	Independent	Incumbent
—	Borough mayor	11,971	Nimâ Machouf; 1,108 (9.26%)	Monique Worth; 6,785 (56.68%)	Michael Labelle; 4,078 (34.07%)		Monique Worth (Pierrefonds-Senneville)
—	Borough mayor	11,971	Nimâ Machouf; 1,108 (9.26%)	Monique Worth; 6,785 (56.68%)	Michael Labelle; 4,078 (34.07%)		Edward Janiszewski (Dollard-des-Ormeaux–Roxboro)
East	City councillor	6,616	Michel Labbé; 609 (9.20%)	Christian G. Dubois; 3,061 (46.27%)	Christina Ibrahim; 1,706 (25.79%)	René E. LeBlanc; 1,114 (16.84%); Eduard Hoyer; 126 (1.90%)	New borough
East	Borough councillor	6,517	Rémi Garand; 764 (11.72%)	Roger Trottier; 3,542 (54.35%)	Mo'reen Alcock; 2,211 (33.93%)		New borough
West	City councillor	5,320	Sylvain Dionne; 483 (9,08%)	Bertrand A. Ward; 3,080 (57.89%)	Eric McCarty; 1,757 (33.03%)		New borough
West	Borough councillor	5,247	Tyrell Alexander; 449 (8.56%)	Catherine Clément-Talbot; 3,149 (60.02%)	Serge David; 1,649 (31.43%)		New borough

=== Le Plateau-Mont-Royal ===
Electoral District	Position	Total valid votes	Candidates				Incumbent
Electoral District	Position	Total valid votes	Projet Montréal	MICU	Vision Montréal	Other	Incumbent
—	Borough mayor	21,945	Claude Mainville; 6,500 (29.62%)	Helen Fotopulos; 10,157 (46.28%)	Richard Théorêt; 5,288 (24.10%)		Helen Fotopulos
DeLorimier	City councillor	8,425	Carl Boileau; Co-candidate for Richard Bergeron; 3,078 (36.53%)	Christine Mitton; 2,838 (33.69%)	Christine Poulin; 2,509 (29.78%)		Nicolas Tétrault (Laurier)
DeLorimier	City councillor	8,425	Carl Boileau; Co-candidate for Richard Bergeron; 3,078 (36.53%)	Christine Mitton; 2,838 (33.69%)	Christine Poulin; 2,509 (29.78%)		Merged district
DeLorimier	City councillor	8,425	Carl Boileau; Co-candidate for Richard Bergeron; 3,078 (36.53%)	Christine Mitton; 2,838 (33.69%)	Christine Poulin; 2,509 (29.78%)		Christine Poulin (Plateau-Mont-Royal)
DeLorimier	Borough councillor	8,242	Émilie Thuillier; 2,993 (36.31%)	Josée Duplessis; 3,002 (36.42%)	Huguette Trudel; 2,247 (27.26%)		New position
Jeanne-Mance	City councillor	6,630	André Cardinal; 2,063 (31.12%)	Michel Prescott; 3,006 (45.34%)	Rose Carone; 1,340 (20.21%)	Alexandre Lefebvre (PÉBM); 133 (2.01%); Diego Blais (ÉVM); 88 (1.33%)	Michel Prescott
Jeanne-Mance	Borough councillor	6,545	Suzanne Boivin; 2,426 (37.07%)	Isabel Dos Santos; 2,740 (41.86%)	Natercia Rodrigues; 1,379 (21.07%)		New position
Mile-End	City councillor	6,917	Claire Tranquille; 2,227 (32.30%)	Michel Labrecque; 3,241 (46.86%)	Serge H. Malaison; 1,449 (20.95%)		Helen Fotopulos
Mile-End	Borough councillor	6,848	Elhaoussine Tahmi; 2,123 (31.00%)	Eleni Fakotakis-Kolaitis; 2,973 (43.41%)	Dimitrios Koufogiorgas; 1,417 (20.69%)	Jacques Méthot (Ind.); 335 (4.89%)	New position

=== Rivière-des-Prairies–Pointe-aux-Trembles ===
Electoral District	Position	Total valid votes	Candidates				Incumbent
Electoral District	Position	Total valid votes	Projet Montréal	MICU	Vision Montréal	Other	Incumbent
—	Borough mayor	28,059		Cosmo Maciocia; 14,113 (50.30%)	Colette Paul; 12,189 (43.44%)	Marius Minier (ÉVM); 1,757 (6.26%)	Cosmo Maciocia
La Pointe-aux-Prairies	City councillor	9,418	Nicolas Bergeron; 500 (5.31%)	Michel Plante; 4,183 (44.41%)	Nicolas Montmorency; 4,382 (46.53%)	Daniel Lavoie (ÉVM); 190 (2.02%); Olivier Pelletier-Giguère (PÉBM); 163 (1.73%)	Colette Paul (Bout-de-l'Île)
La Pointe-aux-Prairies	City councillor	9,418	Nicolas Bergeron; 500 (5.31%)	Michel Plante; 4,183 (44.41%)	Nicolas Montmorency; 4,382 (46.53%)	Daniel Lavoie (ÉVM); 190 (2.02%); Olivier Pelletier-Giguère (PÉBM); 163 (1.73%)	Merged district
La Pointe-aux-Prairies	City councillor	9,418	Nicolas Bergeron; 500 (5.31%)	Michel Plante; 4,183 (44.41%)	Nicolas Montmorency; 4,382 (46.53%)	Daniel Lavoie (ÉVM); 190 (2.02%); Olivier Pelletier-Giguère (PÉBM); 163 (1.73%)	Michel Plante (Rivière-des-Prairies)
La Pointe-aux-Prairies	Borough councillor	9,283	Jean-François Vachon; 872 (9.39%)	Yolaine Gagné Frisko; 4,042 (43.54%)	Joseph Di Pietro; 4,369 (47.06%)		New position
Pointe-aux-Trembles	City councillor	8,996	David Meilleur; 583 (6.48%)	Scott McKay; 3,736 (41.53%)	André Bélisle; 4,262 (47.38%)	Claude Legris (ÉVM); 415 (4.61%)	Marius Minier
Pointe-aux-Trembles	Borough councillor	8,905	Robin Gagnon; 527 (5.92%)	André Dutremble; 3,842 (43.14%)	Suzanne Décarie; 4,536 (50.94%)		New position
Rivière-des-Prairies	City councillor	9,711	Alexandre Bessette; 400 (4.12%)	Joe Magri; 6,379 (65.69%)	Claire Audet; 2,932 (30.19%)		Cosmo Maciocia (Marc-Aurèle-Fortin)
Rivière-des-Prairies	Borough councillor	9,415	Jean Michel Chataigne; 483 (5.13%)	Maria Calderone; 6,093 (64.72%)	Nina V. Fernandez; 2,839 (30.15%)		New position

=== Rosemont–La Petite-Patrie ===
Electoral District	Position	Total valid votes	Candidates				Incumbent
Electoral District	Position	Total valid votes	Projet Montréal	MICU	Vision Montréal	Other	Incumbent
—	Borough mayor	33,295	Marc-André Gadoury; 5,782 (17.37%)	André Lavallée; 14,175 (42.57%)	Denise Larouche; 13,338 (40.06%)		Denise Larouche
Étienne-Desmarteau	City councillor	8,443	Carl Bégin; 1,734 (20.54%)	Carole Du Sault; 3,479 (41.21%)	Yvon Roy; 2,985 (35.35%)	David Lessard-Gagnon (PÉBM); 245 (2.90%)	Nicole Thibault (Étienne-Desmarteau)
Étienne-Desmarteau	City councillor	8,443	Carl Bégin; 1,734 (20.54%)	Carole Du Sault; 3,479 (41.21%)	Yvon Roy; 2,985 (35.35%)	David Lessard-Gagnon (PÉBM); 245 (2.90%)	Merged district
Étienne-Desmarteau	City councillor	8,443	Carl Bégin; 1,734 (20.54%)	Carole Du Sault; 3,479 (41.21%)	Yvon Roy; 2,985 (35.35%)	David Lessard-Gagnon (PÉBM); 245 (2.90%)	Jean-François Plante (Louis-Hébert)
Marie-Victorin	City councillor	8,937	Gilles Lortie; 672 (7.52%)	Carle Bernier-Genest; 3,105 (34.74%)	Nicole Thibault; Co-candidate for Pierre Bourque; 3,405 (38.10%)	Kettly Beauregard (Ind.); 1,755 (19.64%)	Pierre Bourque
Saint-Édouard	City councillor	7,999	Beatriz Guarin; 1,821 (22.77%)	Kenneth George; 2,763 (34.54%)	François Purcell; 3,052 (38.15%)	David Bédard (PÉBM); 236 (2.95%); Étienne Pélissier (Ind.); 127 (1.59%)	François Purcell
Vieux-Rosemont	City councillor	8,184	Patrick Cigana; 1,250 (15.27%)	Gilles Grondin; 3,783 (46.22%)	Leonardo Fiore; 3,151 (38.50%)		Denise Larouche

=== Saint-Laurent ===
Electoral District	Position	Total valid votes	Candidates				Incumbent
Electoral District	Position	Total valid votes	Projet Montréal	MICU	Vision Montréal	Independent	Incumbent
—	Borough mayor	16,278	Maudeline Châtaigne; 1,057 (6.49%)	Alan DeSousa; 10,960 (67.33%)	Vincent Bilodeau; 4,261 (26.18%)		Alan DeSousa
Côte-de-Liesse	City councillor	7,365	Roger Gagnon; 673 (9.14%)	Laval Demers; 4,506 (61.18%)	Manolis Makris; 2,026 (27.51%)	Bryce Durafourt; 160 (2.17%)	New position
Côte-de-Liesse	Borough councillor	7,311	Lumola Lusiama; 580 (7.93%)	Maurice Cohen; 5,003 (68.43%)	Michael Benitah; 1,728 (23.64%)		Maurice Cohen
Norman-McLaren	City councillor	8,907	Mohammed Benzaria; 610 (6.85%)	Patricia Bittar; 5,151 (57.83%)	Aref Salem; 3,146 (35.32%)		New position
Norman-McLaren	Borough councillor	8,646	Sébastien Tétreault; 742 (8.58%)	Michèle D. Biron; 5,079 (58.74%)	Benoît Goulet; 2,825 (32.67%)		Michèle D. Biron

=== Saint-Léonard ===
Electoral District	Position	Total valid votes	Candidates			Incumbent
Electoral District	Position	Total valid votes	MICU	Vision Montréal	Other	Incumbent
—	Borough mayor	17,332	Frank Zampino; 13,554 (78.20%)	Joseph Charles Raschella; 3,778 (21.80%)		Frank Zampino
Saint-Léonard-Est	City councillor	7,481	Yvette Bissonnet; 5,682 (75.95%)	Hugues Surprenant; 1,533 (20.49%)	Alain Perrier (PÉBM); 266 (3.56%)	New position
Saint-Léonard-Est	Borough councillor	7,347	Robert L. Zambito; 4,762 (64.82%)	Jean-Marc Boivin; 1,478 (20.12%)	Domenico Moschella (Ind.); 1,107 (15.07%)	Robert L. Zambito (Grande-Prairie)
Saint-Léonard-Ouest	City councillor	9,731	Dominic Perri; 6,977 (71.70%)	Rocco De Robertis; 2,462 (25.30%)	Milan Mirich (PÉBM); 292 (3.00%)	New position
Saint-Léonard-Ouest	Borough councillor	9,553	Mario Battista; 6,966 (72.92%)	Claudia Martinez; 2,587 (27.08%)		Mario Battista (Port-Maurice)

=== Le Sud-Ouest ===
Electoral District	Position	Total valid votes	Candidates				Incumbent
Electoral District	Position	Total valid votes	Projet Montréal	MICU	Vision Montréal	Other	Incumbent
—	Borough mayor	14,702	Pierre M. Valiquette; 1,565 (10.64%)	Jacqueline Montpetit; 5,939 (40.40%)	Robert Bousquet; 5,901 (40.14%)	Daniel Tremblay (ÉV-M); 1,041 (7.08%); Glenmore Browne (Ind.); 256 (1.784)	Jacqueline Montpetit
Saint-Henri–Petite-Bourgogne–Pointe-Saint-Charles	City councillor	7,350	Nicole Cloutier; 1,283 (17.46%)	Brenda Paris; 2,792 (37.99%)	Line Hamel; 3,275 (44.56%)		Line Hamel (Louis-Cyr)
Saint-Henri–Petite-Bourgogne–Pointe-Saint-Charles	City councillor	7,350	Nicole Cloutier; 1,283 (17.46%)	Brenda Paris; 2,792 (37.99%)	Line Hamel; 3,275 (44.56%)		Merged district
Saint-Henri–Petite-Bourgogne–Pointe-Saint-Charles	City councillor	7,350	Nicole Cloutier; 1,283 (17.46%)	Brenda Paris; 2,792 (37.99%)	Line Hamel; 3,275 (44.56%)		Jacqueline Montpetit (Pointe-Saint-Charles)
Saint-Henri–Petite-Bourgogne–Pointe-Saint-Charles	Borough councillor	7,187	Mathieu Winnicki; 1,350 (18.78%)	Pierre E. Fréchette; 2,957 (41.14%)	Charles Veilleux; 2,880 (40.07%)		New position
Saint-Paul–Émard	City councillor	7,454	Francis Lizotte-Bédard; 718 (9.63%)	Daniel Bélanger; 3,331 (44.69%)	Jean-Yves Cartier; 3,405 (45.68%)		Robert Bousquet (Émard)
Saint-Paul–Émard	Borough councillor	7,279	Mélissa Simard; 949 (13.04%)	Paul Émile-Rioux; 2,874 (39.48%)	Ronald Bossy; 3,456 (47.48%)		New position

=== Verdun ===
Electoral District	Position	Total valid votes	Candidates				Incumbent
Electoral District	Position	Total valid votes	Projet Montréal	MICU	Vision Montréal	Other	Incumbent
—	Borough mayor	14,566		Claude Trudel; 9,283 (63.73%)	Philippe Lalonde; 5,283 (36.27%)		Georges Bossé
Champlain– L'Île-des-Sœurs	City councillor	7,498	Guylaine Vignola; 510 (6.80%)	Ginette Marotte; 4,176 (55.69%)	Daniel Beaudin; 1,992 (26.57%)	Robert Filiatrault (Ind.); 695 (9.27%); François Desrochers (PÉBM); 125 (1.67%)	New position
Champlain– L'Île-des-Sœurs	Borough councillor I	7,406	Nancy Turgeon; 817 (11.03%)	Paul Beaupré; 4,214 (56.90%)	Pierre Labrosse; 2,375 (32.07%)		Ginette Marotte (Champlain)
Champlain– L'Île-des-Sœurs	Borough councillor II	7,426	Francis Fortier; 682 (9.18%)	Marc Touchette; 4,168 (56.13%)	Francine LeBlanc; 2,576 (34.69%)		Ginette Marotte (Champlain)
Desmarchais-Crawford	City councillor	7,238	Mathieu Fontaine; 791 (10.93%)	Alain Tassé; 4,066 (56.18%)	Alain Fortier; 2,381 (32.90%)		New position
Desmarchais-Crawford	Borough councillor I	7,047		Josée Lavigueur Thériault; 4,326 (61.39%)	Véronique Matte; 2,721 (38.61%)		John Gallagher
Desmarchais-Crawford	Borough councillor II	7,195		André Savard; 4,562 (63.41%)	Brian McCarthy; 2,633 (36.59%)		John Gallagher

=== Ville-Marie ===
Electoral District	Position	Total valid votes	Candidates				Incumbent
Electoral District	Position	Total valid votes	Projet Montréal	MICU	Vision Montréal	Other	Incumbent
—	Borough mayor	14,679	Jean-Pierre Denis; 2,121 (14.45%)	Benoît Labonté; 5,816 (39.62%)	Robert Laramée; 5,116 (34.85%)	Louise O'Sullivan (ÉVM); 1,626 (11.08%)	Martin Lemay
Peter-McGill	City councillor	6,174	Simon Cloutier; 715 (11.58%)	Catherine Sévigny; Co-candidate for Gérald Tremblay; 3,569 (57.81%)	Richard Fradette; 1,493 (24.18%)	Xavier Facchin (ÉVM); 397 (6.43%)	Louise O'Sullivan
Peter-McGill	Borough councillor	6,034	Damien Girard; 837 (13.87%)	Karim Boulos; 3,257 (53.98%)	Ybet Zamalloa; 1,345 (22.29%)	William Shad Elhami (ÉVM); 467 (7.74%); Thérèse Oliff (Ind.); 128 (2.12%)	New position
Sainte-Marie–Saint-Jacques	City councillor	8,566	Jean-Pierre Bonhomme; 1,734 (20.24%)	Sammy Forcillo; 3,577 (41.76%)	Lynda Brault; 3,153 (36.81%)	Claude Hopfenblum (Ind.); 102 (1.19%)	Martin Lemay (Sainte-Marie)
Sainte-Marie–Saint-Jacques	City councillor	8,566	Jean-Pierre Bonhomme; 1,734 (20.24%)	Sammy Forcillo; 3,577 (41.76%)	Lynda Brault; 3,153 (36.81%)	Claude Hopfenblum (Ind.); 102 (1.19%)	Merged district
Sainte-Marie–Saint-Jacques	City councillor	8,566	Jean-Pierre Bonhomme; 1,734 (20.24%)	Sammy Forcillo; 3,577 (41.76%)	Lynda Brault; 3,153 (36.81%)	Claude Hopfenblum (Ind.); 102 (1.19%)	Robert Laramée (Saint-Jacques)
Sainte-Marie–Saint-Jacques	Borough councillor	8,274	Brian M. Doody; 1,847 (22.32%)	Jean-Yves Duthel; 3,072 (37.13%)	Pierre Mainville; 3,355 (40.55%)		New position

=== Villeray–Saint-Michel–Parc-Extension ===
Electoral District	Position	Total valid votes	Candidates				Incumbent
Electoral District	Position	Total valid votes	Projet Montréal	MICU	Vision Montréal	Other	Incumbent
—	Borough mayor	28,975	Jose Luis Bolanos; 3,616 (12.48%)	Paolo V. Tamburello; 11,122 (38.38%)	Anie Samson; 13,109 (45.24%)	Muhammad Haseen (Ind.); 1,128 (3.89%)	Paolo V. Tamburello
François-Perrault	City councillor	7,520	Maria Marra; 1,348 (17.93%)	Frank Venneri; 3,206 (42.63%)	Vittorio Capparelli; 2,966 (39.44%)		Frank Venneri (Jean-Rivard)
Parc-Extension	City councillor	6,974	Antoine Thomasset-Laperrière; 473 (6.78%)	Vanna Vong; 1,227 (17.59%)	Mary Deros; 4,631 (66.40%)	Mubashar Rasool (Ind.); 522 (7.48%); Conrad David Brillantes (Ind.); 121 (1.74%)	Mary Deros
Saint-Michel	City councillor	6,377	Valentino Nelson; 753 (11.81%)	Soraya Martinez; 2,883 (45.21%)	Nicole Roy-Arcelin; 2,741 (42.98%)		Paolo V. Tamburello
Villeray	City councillor	8,401	Eric Daoust; 1,965 (23.39%)	Sylvain Lachance; 3,277 (39.01%)	Martine Carrière; 3,159 (37.60%)		Sylvain Lachance (Villeray)
Villeray	City councillor	8,401	Eric Daoust; 1,965 (23.39%)	Sylvain Lachance; 3,277 (39.01%)	Martine Carrière; 3,159 (37.60%)		Merged district
Villeray	City councillor	8,401	Eric Daoust; 1,965 (23.39%)	Sylvain Lachance; 3,277 (39.01%)	Martine Carrière; 3,159 (37.60%)		Anie Samson (Jarry)

Source: Election results, 1833-2005 (in French), City of Montreal.

=== Post-election changes ===
- Pierre Bourque resigned as councillor for Marie-Victorin in 2006. A by-election was held to choose his replacement on September 24, 2006.

Montreal municipal by-election, 24 September 2006: Councillor, Marie-Victorin
Party	Candidate	Votes	%
Montreal Island Citizens Union	Carle Bernier-Genest	2,035	38.58
Projet Montréal	Kettly Beauregard	1,704	32.30
Vision Montreal	Réal Charest	1,220	23.13
Independent	Nicole Thibault	316	5.99
Total valid votes		5,275	100
Source: Official Results (in French), City of Montreal.

- Frank Zampino resigned as borough mayor of Saint-Leonard in 2008. He was replaced on an interim basis by Yvette Bissonnet. A by-election to choose a permanent replacement was held on September 21, 2008.

Saint-Leonard municipal by-election, 21 September 2008: Mayor
Party	Candidate	Votes	%
Union Montreal	Michel Bissonnet	11,450	94.32
Projet Montréal	Livio Di Celmo	308	2.54
Vision Montreal	Mélina Maiorano	271	2.23
Independent	David Mallozzi	110	0.91
Total valid votes		12,139	100
Source: Official results - Saint-Léonard borough, Septembre 21, 2008, City of Montreal, accessed 14 August 2011.

- Pierre Lapointe, city councillor for Ahuntsic, died on April 12, 2008. A by-election to choose his replacement was held on September 21, 2008.

Ahuntsic-Cartierville municipal by-election, 21 September 2008: Councillor, Ahuntsic
Party	Candidate	Votes	%
Vision Montreal	Hasmig Belleli	2,244	36.43
Union Montreal	Michel Hamel	2,185	35.48
Projet Montréal	Émilie Thuillier	1,652	26.82
Independent	Christian Prévost	78	1.27
Total valid votes		6,159	100
Source: Official results - Ahuntsic electoral district, Ahuntsic-Cartierville borough, September 21, 2008, City of Montreal, accessed 19 January 2013.

Preceded by 2001	Montreal municipal elections 2005	Succeeded by 2009
