= Hasmig Belleli =

Canadian politician

Montreal City Councillor for Ahuntsic
- In office 2008–2009
- Preceded by: Pierre Lapointe
- Succeeded by: Émilie Thuillier
- In office 1994–2001
- Preceded by: Alain André
- Succeeded by: Pierre Lapointe

Montreal City Councillor for Acadie
- In office 2001–2005
- Preceded by: Noushig Eloyan
- Succeeded by: position eliminated

Personal details
- Party: Vision Montréal

Hasmig Belleli is a politician in Montreal, Quebec, Canada. She served on the Montreal city council from 1994 to 2005 and again from 2008 to 2009 as a member of Vision Montreal.

== Early life ==
Belleli was born Hasmig Vasilian in Lebanon, to a family of Armenian background. She moved to Canada with her husband in 1967. During her time on council, she fought for a memorial to the Armenian genocide to be constructed in Montreal.

== City councillor ==
1994–2005

Belleli was first elected to city council in the 1994 municipal election in the Ahuntsic ward. Vision Montreal won a council majority in this election, and Belleli served as a backbench supporter of Pierre Bourque's administration. She supported the mayor during the Vision Montreal internal party crisis of 1997, and in February 1997 she was appointed as chair of the city's urban planning commission and to the Montreal Urban Community's administration and finance committee.

Belleli was re-elected in the 1998 municipal election, in which Vision Montreal won a second consecutive council majority. She continued serving as chair of the urban planning commission following the election. In March 1999, her committee approved a controversial housing project in one of the city's largest remaining greenspaces, at the foot of Mount Royal. The committee later approved initiatives to construct condominiums on the Redpath Refinery, transform the Rialto Theatre into a dance club, and launch a Loblaws store in Ahuntsic. (Belleli abstained from voting on the last two decisions and voted against the Loblaws plan when it came before council.)

In 2001, Belleli's committee voted to support demolition of the dormant York Theatre in order to permit an expansion of Concordia University. She defended this decision against the complaints of heritage groups, saying, "It seems to me that in no case do these groups make a gesture (like) a financing campaign each year to collect money to buy these buildings and conserve them. It's easy to say conserve, conserve, conserve."

Belleli supported Mayor Bourque's successful campaign to create a single municipal administration for the Island of Montreal. She was elected to a third council term for the Acadie division in 2001, as Gérald Tremblay's Montreal Island Citizens Union (MICU) defeated Vision Montreal across the city. She served in opposition for the next four years and was defeated in her bid for re-election in 2005.

2008–2009

Belleli returned to city council after winning a by-election for the Ahuntsic division in 2008. Tremblay's party (renamed as Union Montreal) still held a majority on council, and Belleli again served as an opposition member. She sought re-election for the neighbouring Bordeaux-Cartierville division in 2009 but was defeated by Harout Chitilian of Union Montreal.

By virtue of holding her seat on city council, Belleli was also a member of the Ahuntsic-Cartierville borough council from 2001 to 2005 and again from 2008 to 2009.

== Federal politics ==
Belleli was nominated as the Liberal Party of Canada's candidate for Alfred-Pellan prior to the 2008 federal election. She withdrew from the contest after being re-elected to city council.

== Electoral record ==
2009 Montreal municipal election: Councillor, Bordeaux-Cartierville
Party	Candidate	Votes	%
Union Montreal	Harout Chitilian	3,040	37.71
Vision Montreal	(x)Hasmig Belleli	2,578	31.98
Projet Montréal	Pericles Creticos	2,040	25.31
Parti Montréal Ville-Marie	John Gentile	403	5.00
Total valid votes		8,061	100
Source: Election results, 2009, City of Montreal.

Ahuntsic-Cartierville municipal by-election, 21 September 2008: Councillor, Ahuntsic
Party	Candidate	Votes	%
Vision Montreal	Hasmig Belleli	2,244	36.43
Union Montreal	Michel Hamel	2,185	35.48
Projet Montréal	Émilie Thuillier	1,652	26.82
Independent	Christian Prévost	78	1.27
Total valid votes		6,159	100
Source: Official results - Ahuntsic electoral district, Ahuntsic-Cartierville borough, September 21, 2008, City of Montreal, accessed 19 January 2013.

2005 Montreal municipal election: Councillor, Ahuntsic
Party	Candidate	Votes	%
Montreal Island Citizens Union	(x)Pierre Lapointe	3,956	44.38
Vision Montreal	(x)Hasmig Belleli	3,628	40.70
Projet Montréal	Pierre-Léo Mongeon-Bourbonnais	1,329	14.91
Total valid votes		8,913	100
Source: City of Montreal official results (in French), City of Montreal.

2001 Montreal municipal election: Councillor, Acadie
Party	Candidate	Votes	%
Vision Montreal	(x)Hasmig Belleli	5,493	59.51
Montreal Island Citizens Union	James Kromida	3,737	40.49
Total valid votes		9,230	100
Source: Election results, 1833-2005 (in French), City of Montreal.

1998 Montreal municipal election: Councillor, Ahuntsic
Party	Candidate	Votes	%
Vision Montreal	Hasmig Belleli (incumbent)	3,900	50.04
New Montreal	Jimmy V. Capogreco co-listed with Jacques Duchesneau	2,119	27.19
Team Montreal	Pierre Veilleux	793	10.17
Montreal Citizens' Movement	Renée Millette	754	9.67
Democratic Coalition	Néomie Larocque de Roquebrune	137	1.76
Montreal 2000	Yvan Tremblay	91	1.17
Total valid votes		7,794	100.00
Source: Official Results, City of Montreal.

1994 Montreal municipal election: Councillor, Ahuntsic
Party	Candidate	Votes	%
Vision Montreal	Hasmig Belleli	3,458	46.19
Montreal Citizens' Movement	Michel L'Allier	2,182	29.15
Montrealers' Party	Michel Bureau	943	12.60
Independent	Ghassan Saba	572	7.64
Democratic Coalition–Ecology Montreal	Jean-Pierre Le Blanc	203	2.71
White Elephant Party	Christian Coutu	128	1.71
Total valid votes		7,486	100
Source: Official Results, City of Montreal
