= Pierre Lapointe (politician) =

Pierre Lapointe (died April 12, 2008) was a municipal politician in Montreal, Quebec, Canada. He served on the Montreal city council from 1998 until his death, originally as a member of Vision Montreal (VM) and later with the Montreal Island Citizens Union (MICU).

Lapointe was the brother of provincial politician Lisette Lapointe and the brother-in-law of her husband, Jacques Parizeau, who served as premier of Quebec from 1994 to 1996.

== Political career ==
Lapointe was first elected to city council in the 1998 municipal election for the Fleury division. Vision Montreal won a council majority in this cycle, and Lapointe was a backbench supporter of Mayor Pierre Bourque's administration for the next three years. He was re-elected for the redistributed Ahuntsic division in the 2001 election; Vision Montreal was defeated by MICU, and he subsequently served as a member of the opposition.

Lapointe crossed the floor to join MICU on December 12, 2003. In February 2004, he was elected to MICU's executive committee as one of three members representing the elected party caucus. He was re-elected under his new party's banner in the 2005 campaign.

By virtue of holding his seat on city council, Lapointe also served as a member of the Ahuntsic-Cartierville borough council following the 2001 election. He died of cancer on April 12, 2008.

== Electoral record ==
2005 Montreal municipal election: Councillor, Ahuntsic
Party	Candidate	Votes	%
Montreal Island Citizens Union	(x)Pierre Lapointe	3,956	44.38
Vision Montreal	(x)Hasmig Belleli	3,628	40.70
Projet Montréal	Pierre-Léo Mongeon-Bourbonnais	1,329	14.91
Total valid votes		8,913	100
Source: City of Montreal official results (in French), City of Montreal.

2001 Montreal municipal election: Councillor, Ahuntsic
Party	Candidate	Votes	%
Vision Montreal	(x)Pierre Lapointe	6,673	65.17
Montreal Island Citizens Union	Pierre Lachapelle	3,566	34.83
Total valid votes		10,239	100
Source: Election results, 1833-2005 (in French), City of Montreal.

1998 Montreal municipal election: Councillor, Fleury
Party	Candidate	Votes	%
Vision Montreal	Pierre Lapointe	3,015	36.18
New Montreal	Pierre de Montigny	2,284	27.41
Independent	Pierre Lachapelle	1,410	16.92
Team Montreal	Martin Blanc	1,355	16.26
Montreal 2000	Stéphanie Dubois	159	1.91
Democratic Coalition	Henry See	111	1.33
Total valid votes		8,334	100.00
Source: Official Results, City of Montreal.
