= Émilie Thuillier =

Canadian politician

Emilie Thuillier

Borough Mayor of Ahuntsic-Cartierville
- Incumbent
- Assumed office 2017
- Preceded by: Pierre Gagnier

Vice-Chair of the Montreal Executive Committee (with Benoit Dorais)
- Incumbent
- Assumed office 2012
- Preceded by: Alan DeSousa and Richard Deschamps

Member of the Montreal Executive Committee responsible for social and community development, family, seniors, youth and the status of women
- Incumbent
- Assumed office 2012
- Preceded by: Jocelyn Ann Campbell (Social and Community Development, Family, and Seniors); Mary Deros (Youth); Helen Fotopulos (Status of Women)

Montreal City Councillor for Ahuntsic
- In office 2009–2017
- Preceded by: Hasmig Belleli
- Succeeded by: Nathalie Goulet

Personal details
- Party: Projet Montréal

Emilie Thuillier is a politician in Montreal, Quebec, Canada. She has served on the Montreal city council since 2009, representing the district of Ahuntsic as a member of Projet Montréal, and has been a member of the Montreal executive committee since November 2012.

== Early political career ==
Thuillier holds a bachelor's degree in geography from the Université de Montréal and a master's degree in sciences and the environment from the Université du Québec à Montréal. She became a founding member of Projet Montréal in 2004 while writing her master's thesis on urban sustainable development. Not long thereafter, she was chosen as the party's vice-president.

She first sought election to the Plateau-Mont-Royal borough council in the 2005 Montreal municipal election, running in the De Lorimier division. The returns office initially declared her elected by twelve votes, but the final recount showed that she was defeated by nine. Had she won, she would have been only the second representative of her party elected anywhere in the city. After the campaign, she became a leading Projet Montréal spokesperson and press attaché to its leader, Richard Bergeron.

Thuillier later ran for Montreal city council in a 2008 by-election in Ahuntsic. She finished third against Vision Montreal's Hasmig Belleli.

== City councillor ==
Thuillier ran in Ahuntsic again in the 2009 municipal election and was elected in a close three-way contest; one of her opponents was former provincial cabinet minister Diane Lemieux. Gérald Tremblay's Union Montreal won a majority on council and served as the governing party for the next three years, initially with Vision Montreal and Projet Montréal as junior coalition partners and later its own.

Tremblay resigned as mayor in November 2012 amid the backdrop of a serious corruption scandal. He was replaced by Michael Applebaum, who formed a coalition government with representation from all parties on council and some independents. Applebaum announced his executive committee on November 22, 2012, appointing Thuillier to one of two vice-chair positions, with responsibility for social and community development, family, seniors, youth and the status of women. In June 2013, she helped organize a safety campaign for the benefit of seniors living in social housing.

Applebaum, in turn, resigned as mayor in June 2013. His successor, Laurent Blanchard, re-appointed Thuillier to the same executive positions.

By virtue of her position on city council, Thuillier was also a member of the Ahuntsic-Cartierville borough council.

In the 2017 municipal election, Thuillier ran to replace Pierre Gagnier of Équipe Coderre, who was not seeking re-election. She ultimately defeated Équipe Coderre stalwart Harout Chitilian to win the position.

== Electoral record ==
2009 Montreal municipal election: Councillor, Ahuntsic
Party	Candidate	Votes	%
Projet Montréal	Émilie Thuillier	3,484	34.17
Union Montreal	Diane Lemieux	3,364	33.00
Vision Montreal	Frédéric Lapointe	3,347	32.83
Total valid votes		10,195	100
Source: Election results, 2009, City of Montreal.

Ahuntsic-Cartierville municipal by-election, 21 September 2008: Councillor, Ahuntsic
Party	Candidate	Votes	%
Vision Montreal	Hasmig Belleli	2,244	36.43
Union Montreal	Michel Hamel	2,185	35.48
Projet Montréal	Émilie Thuillier	1,652	26.82
Independent	Christian Prévost	78	1.27
Total valid votes		6,159	100
Source: Official results - Ahuntsic electoral district, Ahuntsic-Cartierville borough, September 21, 2008, City of Montreal, accessed 19 January 2013.

2005 Montreal municipal election: Plateau-Mont-Royal borough Councillor, De Lorimier
Party	Candidate	Votes	%
Montreal Island Citizens Union	Josée Duplessis	3,002	36.42
Projet Montréal	Émilie Thuillier	2,993	36.31
Vision Montreal	Huguette Trudel	2,247	27.26
Total valid votes		8,242	100
Source: City of Montreal official results (in French), City of Montreal.
