= Gaëtan Primeau =

Montreal City Councillor for Tétreaultville
- In office 2005–2013
- Preceded by: Ivon Le Duc
- Succeeded by: Richard Celzi

Opposition Leader on Montreal City Council
- In office October 2009 – November 2009
- Preceded by: Benoît Labonté
- Succeeded by: Louise Harel

Chair of the Vision Montreal caucus
- In office 2008–2012
- Preceded by: Claire St-Arnaud
- Succeeded by: Benoit Dorais

Personal details
- Born: April 16, 1941 (age 85)
- Party: Vision Montréal

Gaëtan Primeau (born April 16, 1941) was a politician in Montreal, Quebec, Canada. He had served on the Montreal city council from 2005 until his defeat in 2013, representing the east-end district of Tétreaultville as a member of Vision Montreal.

== Early life and career ==
Primeau was born in Montreal. He has a certificate in surveying from Collège Ahuntsic and a certificate in civil engineering from the École Polytechnique de Montréal. Before entering political life, he worked for thirty years as an employee of the City of Montreal, including a term in the office of the chair of the Montreal executive committee (i.e., the municipal cabinet).

== City councillor ==
First term

Primeau was first elected to council in the 2005 municipal election. Mayor Gérald Tremblay's Montreal Island Citizens Union (MICU) won a majority government in this election, and Primeau served as a member of the official opposition. In late 2006, he spoke against a proposal to rename Montreal's Parc Avenue after former Quebec premier Robert Bourassa. In the same period, he joined with fellow councillor Laurent Blanchard in a "bathrobe protest," showing up to a 6 am budget meeting dressed in his bathrobe and arguing that the meeting had been scheduled too early for public participation. In 2008, he was appointed to the municipal committee on transportation, infrastructure management, and the environment.

Primeau was chosen as Vision Montreal's caucus leader in December 2008. Two months later, he publicly defended party leader Benoît Labonté against criticisms from former executive director Robert Laramée, who had called on Labonté to resign or be ousted in the face of weak polling numbers. Labonté ultimately resigned as Vision Montreal leader in June 2009 and was replaced by Louise Harel.

After resigning as party leader, Labonté initially continued to serve as leader of the opposition on council. He stood down from the latter position in October 2009, following rumours (which he strenuously denied) of involvement in a municipal corruption scandal. According to a report in the Montreal Gazette, Primeau succeeded to the position of opposition leader and served for a brief term in late 2009 before resigning in favour of Louise Harel.

Second term

Primeau was re-elected to a second council term in the 2009 municipal election. Tremblay's party, now renamed as Union Montreal, was re-elected with another majority, and Primeau continued to serve in opposition. He was appointed to the city's finance committee in December 2009 and has also served as his party's sports and recreation critic. He stood down as caucus chair in 2012.

Tremblay resigned as mayor against the backup of a serious corruption scandal in late 2012 and was replaced by Michael Applebaum. In early 2013, Primeau was appointed to a committee empowered to examine municipal contracts.

By virtue of holding his seat on city council, Primeau was also a member of the Mercier–Hochelaga-Maisonneuve borough council. He was defeated in 2013 by Richard Celzi of Équipe Denis Coderre.

== Electoral record ==
2009 Montreal municipal election: Councillor, Tétreaultville
Party	Candidate	Votes	%
Vision Montreal	Gaëtan Primeau (incumbent)	4,770	45.95
Projet Montréal	Suzie Miron	3,196	30.79
Union Montreal	Serge Malaison	2,414	23.26
Total valid votes		10,380	100
Source: Municipal Election Results, 2009, City of Montreal.

2005 Montreal municipal election: Councillor, Tétreaultville
Party	Candidate	Votes	%
Vision Montreal	Gaëtan Primeau	4,525	48.47
Montreal Island Citizens Union	Marcel Henry	3,839	41.12
Projet Montréal	Pascal Meilleur	971	10.40
Total valid votes		9,335	100
Source: Election results, 1833-2005 (in French), City of Montreal.
