= Jocelyn Ann Campbell =

Canadian politician

Montreal City Councillor for Saint-Sulpice
- In office 2005 – Pierre Desrochers
- Preceded by: Maurice Beauchamp

Member of the Montreal Executive Committee responsible for social and community development, family, and seniors
- In office 2011–2012
- Preceded by: Lyn Thériault
- Succeeded by: Émilie Thuillier

Ville-Marie Borough Council member, appointed by the Mayor of Montreal (with Richard Deschamps)
- In office 2009–2012
- Preceded by: position created
- Succeeded by: Richard Bergeron and Véronique Fournier

Personal details
- Party: Montreal Island Citizens Union / Union Montreal (2005-2012); Independent (2012-)

Jocelyn Ann Campbell is a politician in Montreal, Quebec, Canada. She represented the north-end division of Saint-Sulpice on Montreal city council from 2005 to 2013 and was a member of the Montreal executive committee from 2011 to 2012. Formerly a member of Union Montreal, Campbell became an independent councillor in late 2012. She did not run for re-election in the 2013 municipal election, and was succeeded by Pierre Desrochers.

== Early public career ==
Campbell was press secretary for the New Democratic Party of Quebec in the 1980s. Her innovative press release for the party's 1985 provincial election bus tour was noted in the media, and, in the same campaign, she articulated her party's opposition to privatizing state enterprises. She later worked as a press attaché at Montreal's city hall during Jean Doré's mayoral administration. After briefly standing down to work on Doré's successful 1990 re-election bid, she returned to a media relations position with the Montreal executive committee in the early 1990s.

After leaving city hall, Campbell was a spokesperson for the Alliance des professeures et professeurs de Montréal before becoming communications director for the Palais des congrès de Montréal from 1997 to 2005.

In 1994, Campbell co-authored an article that indicated male students were falling behind in high school and university achievement. A 2007 review described the piece as "prescient."

== City councillor ==
Campbell was elected to the Montreal city council in the 2005 municipal election, winning a narrow victory in Saint-Sulpice as a member of mayor Gérald Tremblay's Montreal Island Citizens Union (later renamed as Union Montreal). She was re-elected in an extremely close contest in the 2009 election.

Campbell serves on the Ahuntsic-Cartierville borough council by virtue of being a city councillor elected from the area. In 2009, she was also appointed by Mayor Tremblay to serve on the downtown Ville-Marie borough council.

Executive committee member

Tremblay appointed Campbell to the Montreal executive committee on April 6, 2011, giving her responsibility for social and community development, families, and seniors. Soon thereafter, she promised that the city would devise an action plan by the fall of 2012 to counter racial profiling. She later spoke in favour of setting up supervised injection sites in Montreal, while also arguing that they should be located in existing medical facilities rather than in a single centralized location. In the summer of 2012, she opposed councillor Réal Ménard's proposal to establish a zone where prostitution would be legally tolerated.

Tremblay stood down as mayor of Montreal in November 2012 amid a serious corruption scandal and was replaced by Michael Applebaum. Campbell resigned from the executive committee immediately thereafter, saying that she could not accept Applebaum's approach to politics. She further indicated that she would serve out the remainder of her term and retire from public life at the next municipal election. She resigned from Union Montreal a few days later to sit as an independent councillor. In December 2012, Mayor Applebaum removed Campbell from her position on the Ville-Marie borough council.

Applebaum, in turn, resigned as mayor in June 2013, after being charged with fourteen criminal offenses including fraud and corruption. Campbell backed Harout Chitilian's unsuccessful bid to be chosen by council as his successor.

== Electoral record ==
2009 Montreal municipal election: Councillor, Sainte-Sulpice division
Party	Candidate	Votes	%
Union Montreal	Jocelyn Ann Campbell (incumbent)	3,099	35.60
Vision Montreal	Jean-Jacques Lapointe	3,060	35.15
Projet Montréal	Martin Bazinet	2,546	29.25
Total valid votes		8,705	100
Source: Election results, 2009, City of Montreal.

2005 Montreal municipal election: Councillor, Saint-Sulpice
Party	Candidate	Votes	%
Montreal Island Citizens Union	Jocelyn Ann Campbell	3,400	44.19
Vision Montreal	Alain André	3,094	40.21
Projet Montréal	Pascal Côté	1,200	15.60
Total valid votes		7,694	100
Source: City of Montreal official results (in French), City of Montreal. This source misspells Campbell's last name as "Cambell."
