= Richer Dompierre =

Canadian politician

Montreal City Councillor for Louis-Riel ward
- In office 2005–2009
- Preceded by: Lyn Thériault
- Succeeded by: Lyn Thériault

Montreal City Councillor for Maisonneuve ward
- In office 1998–2005
- Preceded by: Nathalie Malépart
- Succeeded by: position abolished

Personal details
- Born: 28 July 1957 (age 68) Montreal, Quebec, Canada

Richer Dompierre (born July 28, 1957) is a politician in Montreal, Quebec, Canada. He served on the Montreal city council from 1998 to 2009, initially as a member of Vision Montreal (VM) and later for the rival Union Montreal (UM).

== Early life and private career ==
Born in Montreal, Dompierre has worked in the printing sector in 1979. In 2010–11, he was the publisher of "Qui est qui du Québec" (English: "Who's who in Quebec").

== Councillor ==
Dompierre was first elected to the Montreal city council in 1998 as a Vision Montreal candidate in the east-end division of Maisonneuve. VM won a landslide majority in this election under Pierre Bourque's leadership; after the election, Bourque appointed Dompierre as an associate member of the Montreal executive committee (i.e., the municipal cabinet) with responsibility for economic development.

Gérald Tremblay's Montreal Island Citizens Union (MICU) defeated Vision Montreal in the 2001 municipal election. Dompierre was re-elected in Maisonneuve and served as a member of the official opposition; he also became a member of the newly created Mercier–Hochelaga-Maisonneuve borough council. In 2003, he filed a police complaint alleging that fellow Vision Montreal councillor Ivon Le Duc had attacked him during a heated borough council debate over a proposed move of the Jean-Paul Riopelle sculpture La Joute. The chief crown prosecutor confirmed there was enough evidence to charge Le Duc with assault, but ultimately no charges were laid. Le Duc instead took part in a program that allowed for the non-judicial treatment of certain infractions.

Dompierre ran for the redistributed Louis-Riel division in the 2005 municipal election and was narrowly re-elected over fellow councillor Nicolas Tétrault. The electoral office initially showed Tétrault elected by twelve votes, but a more thorough scrutiny confirmed Dompierre as the winner. The following year, Dompierre was the only VM councillor to support an unsuccessful plan to rename Montreal's Park Avenue and Bleury Street area after former Quebec premier Robert Bourassa. He left Vision Montreal to join Tremblay's party (by this time renamed as Union Montreal) in June 2008. In the 2009 municipal election, he was defeated by VM candidate Lyn Thériault.

== Provincial politics ==
Dompierre ran as a Liberal Party candidate in the 2003 Quebec provincial election in the east-end Montreal division of Hochelaga-Maisonneuve. He finished second against Parti Québécois incumbent Louise Harel.

== Electoral record ==
Municipal

2009 Montreal municipal election: Councillor, Louis-Riel
Party	Candidate	Votes	%
Vision Montreal	Lyn Thériault	3,784	39.95
Union Montreal	Richer Dompierre (incumbent)	2,926	30.89
Projet Montréal	Michel Bouchard	2,437	25.73
Independent	Steve Lamer	255	2.69
Independent	Kristian-Andrew Solarik	69	0.73
Total valid votes		9,471	100
Source: Municipal Election Results, 2009, City of Montreal.

2005 Montreal municipal election: Councillor, Louis-Riel
Party	Candidate	Votes	%
Vision Montreal	(x)Richer Dompierre	3,805	45.36
Montreal Island Citizens Union	(x)Nicolas Tétrault	3,755	44.76
Projet Montréal	Daniel Archambault	829	9.88
Total valid votes		8,389	100
Source: Election results, 1833-2005 (in French), City of Montreal.

2001 Montreal municipal election: Councillor, Maisonneuve
Party	Candidate	Votes	%
Vision Montreal	(x)Richer Dompierre	5,745	71.88
Montreal Island Citizens Union	Nancy Boileau	2,248	28.12
Total valid votes		7,993	100
Source: Election results, 1833-2005 (in French), City of Montreal.

1998 Montreal municipal election: Councillor, Maisonneuve
Party	Candidate	Votes	%
Vision Montreal	Richer Dompierre	2,179	47.40
New Montreal	Jean Baribeau	1,047	22.78
Montreal Citizens' Movement	Jacynthe Simard	719	15.64
Team Montreal	Jean Vianney Jutras	652	14.18
Total valid votes		4,597	100.00
Source: Municipal Election Results (1998), City of Montreal

Provincial

2003 Quebec general election: Hochelaga-Maisonneuve
Party	Candidate	Votes	%	±%
Parti Québécois	Louise Harel	13,138	55.77	−4.84
Liberal	Richer Dompierre	6,210	26.36	+0.83
Action démocratique	Louise Blackburn	2,449	10.40	−1.11
UFP	Lise Alarie	788	3.34	–
Bloc Pot	Alex Néron	476	2.02	–
Green	Daniel Breton	367	1.56	–
Marxist–Leninist	Christine Dandenault	79	0.34	−0.28
Christian Democracy	Mario Richard	52	0.22	–
Total valid votes		23,559	98.40	–
Total rejected ballots		383	1.60	–
Turnout		23,942	60.09	−7.92
Electors on the lists		39,843	–	–
Source: Official Results, Le Directeur général des élections du Québec.
