= Ivon Le Duc =

Canadian politician and entrepreneur

Ivon Le Duc is a politician and entrepreneur in Montreal, Quebec, Canada. He served on the Montreal city council from 1994 to 2005 and was a member of the Montreal executive committee (i.e., the municipal cabinet) in Pierre Bourque's administration from 1998 to 2001. Elected three times as a member of Bourque's Vision Montreal (VM) party, he later served with the Montreal Island Citizens Union (MICU) and as an independent.

== Political career ==
Vision Montreal

Le Duc was first elected to council in the 1994 municipal election, defeating incumbent Scott McKay of the Montreal Citizens' Movement (MCM) in the east-end division of Honoré-Beaugrand. Vision Montreal won a majority of seats in this election under Bourque's leadership, and Le Duc initially served as a pro-administration backbencher. He was appointed to a committee of the Montreal Urban Community that explored possible police service mergers.

During the Vision Montreal internal crisis of 1997, Le Duc was a vocal supporter of Bourque's leadership. On February 5, 1997, he was promoted to an associate membership on the executive committee.

Le Duc was re-elected in the 1998 municipal election, in which Bourque's administration won a second mandate. On November 12, 1998, he was named as a full member of the executive committee with responsibility for housing. The following year, he led the executive committee in amending the city's urban planning by-laws to require a 7.5 metre gap between garages in new developments. This was a response to complaints from several Montreal communities where crowded garage construction had restricted parking and snow removal service.

Vision Montreal was defeated by Gérald Tremblay's Montreal Island Citizens Union in the 2001 municipal election. Le Duc was easily re-elected in the redistributed division of Tétreaultville; after the election, he was selected as chair of the new Mercier–Hochelaga-Maisonneuve borough council and served as opposition housing critic on city council. In 2002, he spoke against Mayor Tremblay's plan to construct a major boulevard on Notre Dame Street East. He launched a probe later in the same year into alleged price fixing for Montreal's recycling contracts, charging that two firms controlled most recycling services across the city.

In January 2003, fellow Vision Montreal councillor Richer Dompierre alleged that Le Duc attacked him during a heated borough council debate over the removal of a Jean-Paul Riopelle sculpture. The chief crown prosecutor later confirmed there was enough evidence to charge Le Duc with simple assault, but ultimately Le Duc was able to avoid legal charges by attending a program that allowed for the non-judicial treatment of certain infractions.

MICU and independent

Le Duc resigned from Vision Montreal in February 2003, saying that he felt "betrayed" by Pierre Bourque's decision to run for the Action démocratique du Québec (ADQ) party in the 2003 Quebec provincial election. He retained his position as borough council chair and initially sat as an independent. On December 12, 2003, he joined Tremblay's MICU party. All borough council chairs in Montreal were re-designated as "borough mayors" in 2004.

Le Duc was unexpectedly rejected as MICU's candidate for borough mayor in the 2005 municipal election in favour of former provincial cabinet minister Pierre Bélanger. Le Duc subsequently resigned from MICU and again served as an independent, openly snubbing Tremblay at a major public event in his community. He did not seek re-election in 2005.

Before leaving office, Le Duc charged that there was systematic corruption in Montreal's political culture. He identified a long-standing practice of political parties soliciting money from companies angling for municipal contracts, and said that seventy-five to eighty per cent of contributions to major parties came from entrepreneurs with municipal contracts or from their employees and families. He was also quoted as saying, "Every time someone pays a contribution of $500 or more ... someone receives something in exchange. [...] It's too well-entrenched." As a remedy, he proposed banning anonymous donations to political parties.

== Entrepreneur ==
Le Duc purchased the real estate firm Demtec Inc. in August 2005. The following year, he was profiled in the Montreal Gazette for selling prefabricated houses to Afghanistan in co-operation with a construction firm based in Kabul. After visiting Afghanistan, Le Duc said that the Canadian private sector had almost no presence in the country and accused the Canadian government of failing to promote investment.

He was again profiled by the Gazette in February 2007 for shipping prefabricated houses from Quebec to Alberta.

== Electoral record ==
2001 Montreal municipal election: Councillor, Tétreaultville division
Party	Candidate	Votes	%
Vision Montreal	(x)Ivon Le Duc	7,114	70.56
Montreal Island Citizens Union	Francisca Marques	2,968	29.44
Total valid votes		10,082	100
Source: Election results, 1833-2005 (in French), City of Montreal.

1998 Montreal municipal election: Councillor, Honoré-Beaugrand division
Party	Candidate	Votes	%
Vision Montreal	(x)Ivon Le Duc	3,090	46.94
New Montreal	André Pothier	1,822	27.68
Montreal Citizens' Movement	Patrice Lorrain-Chenu	943	14.32
Team Montreal	Pierre Lizotte	728	11.06
Total valid votes		6,583	100.00
Source: Official Results, City of Montreal. This report wrongly lists Lorrain-Chenu as a Team Montreal candidate. Newspaper reports clarify that he was a candidate of the Montreal Citizens' Movement.

1994 Montreal municipal election: Councillor, Honoré-Beaugrand division
Party	Candidate	Votes	%
Vision Montreal	Ivon Le Duc	2,679	39.83
Montreal Citizens' Movement	(x)Scott McKay	2,422	36.01
Montrealers' Party	Denis Proulx	1,125	16.73
Democratic Coalition–Ecology Montreal	Julie Leduc	262	3.90
Independent	Gilles Simard	156	2.32
White Elephant Party	Guylaine Brisebois	82	1.22
Total valid votes		6,726	100
Source: Official Results, City of Montreal
