= Nicolas Tétrault =

Canadian politician

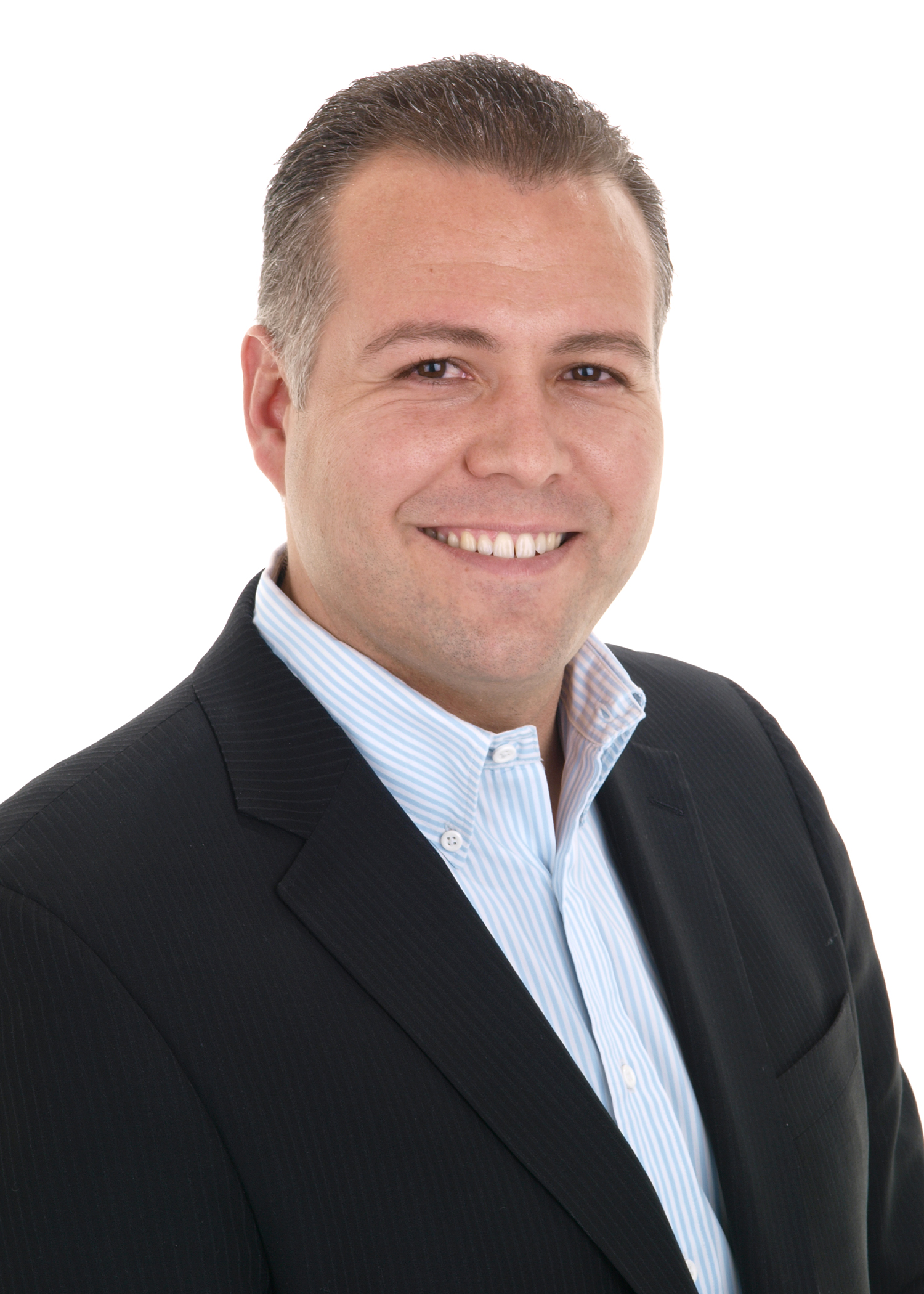

Montreal City Councillor Plateau-Mont-Royal
- In office 2001–2005
- Preceded by: André Cardinal
- Succeeded by: [district abolished]

Personal details
- Party: Vision Montréal, MICU

Nicolas Tétrault is a politician and entrepreneur in Montreal, Quebec, Canada. He served on the Montreal City Council from 2001 to 2005, initially as a member of Vision Montreal (VM) and later for the rival Montreal Island Citizens Union (MICU). Tétrault has also sought election to the House of Commons of Canada and the National Assembly of Quebec. Tétrault has been active real estate mostly in the province of Quebec but also in New-Brunswick, Ontario and Alberta. He also owns majority control of a Montreal-based real estate agency, Royal Lepage du Quartier.

== Early political campaigns ==
Tétrault sought election to the National Assembly of Quebec in the 1994 Quebec provincial election as a Parti Québécois (PQ) candidate in the extremely safe Liberal seat of Robert-Baldwin in west-end Montreal. The youngest candidate in the province at nineteen years of age, he was a CEGEP student during the election. Although it was generally recognized that he had no chance of winning, Tétrault's campaign received a fair amount of media attention. Profiled by the Montreal Gazette in August 1994, he described himself as "the kind of nationalist who is open to discussion." He finished a distant second against Liberal Pierre Marsan on election day.

Tétrault later ran as a Bloc Québécois (BQ) candidate in the Montreal-area riding of Brossard—La Prairie in the 2000 Canadian federal election. He was twenty-five years old during the campaign and operated his own marketing company. In an interview with the Gazette, he said that Canada should adopt a new model of politics and economics based on that of the European Community. He finished second against Liberal Party of Canada incumbent Jacques Saada.

In 2002, Tétrault described the older wing of the Parti Québécois as having lost touch with modern Quebec. Two years later, he said that many people of his generation favoured "sovereignty if necessary but not necessarily sovereignty."

== City councillor ==
Tétrault was elected to the Montreal city council in the 2001 municipal election as a Vision Montreal candidate in the Plateau-Mont-Royal division. During the campaign, he called for a speed limit reduction in the Plateau, increased security in parks and at metro stations, more co-op housing and support for local artists, and more parking spots for businesses. Vision Montreal lost the election to Gérald Tremblay's Montreal Island Citizens Union, and Tétrault served as a member of the official opposition. By virtue of his city council position, he also served on the Plateau-Mont-Royal borough council.

When Pierre Bourque resigned as Vision Montreal leader to run for the National Assembly of Quebec in 2003, Tétrault said that he respected Bourque's decision but did not personally support it. He added that he would "have to look at the options" as to whether he would remain with the party.

During the 2003 provincial election, Tétrault criticized the Quebec Liberal Party for its pledge to permit referendums on municipal demergers. He argued that the pledge would create instability for municipal government on the Island of Montreal, where several municipalities had recently been merged to create a united city. Later in the same year, he supported Mayor Tremblay's compromise plan to devolve some powers to the city's borough councils.

Tétrault resigned from Vision Montreal to sit as an independent on March 4, 2004, and joined MICU on October 26 of the same year. In the 2005 municipal election, he ran for re-election in the Louis-Riel division of the Mercier–Hochelaga-Maisonneuve borough and was narrowly defeated by Vision Montreal incumbent Richer Dompierre. Early reports suggested that Tétrault had won by twelve votes, but a more thorough scrutiny confirmed Dompierre as the winner.

== Private career ==
Tétrault has a Master of Arts degree in political science from the Université de Montréal. After leaving city council, he co-founded Groupe T & T Media with Paul Tietolman. In 2011, Mr. Rajiv Pancholy, former CEO of Microcell Connexions, joined the group of Tietolman Tetrault as a partner and shareholder and formed 7954689 Canada Inc. better known as Tietolman Tetrault Pancholy Media (TTP Media).

In 2013, the group was granted three licenses to launch new AM radio stations in the Montreal market: English and French talk radio stations and a French sports radio station. As of August 2016, however, all three stations remain unlaunched, the French sports radio license has expired, and both of the other two licenses are also set to expire in November if they have not launched by then.

2014: Lawsuits totaling $3.45 million have accumulated against this broker, who sold around twenty condos in the tower where former Laval mayor Gilles Vaillancourt was supposed to move.

== Electoral record ==
2005 Montreal municipal election: Councillor, Louis-Riel
Party	Candidate	Votes	%
Vision Montreal	(x)Richer Dompierre	3,805	45.36
Montreal Island Citizens Union	(x)Nicolas Tétrault	3,755	44.76
Projet Montréal	Daniel Archambault	829	9.88
Total valid votes		8,389	100
Source: Election results, 1833-2005 (in French), City of Montreal.

2001 Montreal municipal election: Councillor, Plateau-Mont-Royal
Party	Candidate	Votes	%
Vision Montreal	Nicolas Tétrault	5,248	61.66
Montreal Island Citizens Union	André Cardinal (incumbent)	2,510	29.49
White Elephant Party	Josée Fournier	510	5.99
Independent	Ann Farrell	150	1.76
Independent	Man Yee Cheung	93	1.09
Total valid votes		8,511	100
Source: Election results, 1833-2005 (in French), City of Montreal.

2000 Canadian federal election: Brossard—La Prairie
Party	Candidate	Votes	%	±%	Expenditures
Liberal	Jacques Saada	26,806	52.69	–	$63,331
Bloc Québécois	Nicolas Tétrault	16,758	32.94		$66,058
Alliance	Richard Bélisle	2,973	5.84		$8,956
Progressive Conservative	Sylvain St-Louis	2,783	5.47		$50
New Democratic	Clémence Provencher	852	1.67		none listed
Natural Law	Sylvia Larrass	528	1.04		none listed
Marxist–Leninist	Normand Chouinard	172	0.34		$10
Total valid votes/expenditures limit		50,872	100.00		$69,269
Total rejected ballots		1,067			
Turnout		51,939	66.13		
Electors on the lists		78,535			
Sources: Official Results, Elections Canada and Financial Returns, Elections Canada.

1994 Quebec general election: Robert-Baldwin
Party	Candidate	Votes	%	±%
Liberal	Pierre Marsan	29,865	82.98	+36.93
Parti Québécois	Nicolas Tétrault	3,541	9.84	−3.09
Equality	Bart Sellitto	969	2.69	−38.33
Action démocratique	Mario Pilote Jr.	909	2.53	–
CANADA!	Harry Polansky	364	1.01	–
Natural Law	Ruby Finkelstein	123	0.34	–
Republic of Canada	Robert Charles	120	0.33	–
Innovator	Martin Leduc	99	0.28	–
Total valid votes		35,990	99.20	–
Rejected and declined votes		291	0.80	–
Turnout		36,281	85.17	+10.50
Electors on the lists		42,600	–	–
Source: Official Results, Le Directeur général des élections du Québec.
