= Sammy Forcillo =

Canadian politician (1950–2026)

Savino "Sammy" Forcillo (8 October 1950 – 9 April 2026) was a Canadian politician who was a onetime mayor of Ville-Marie borough in Montreal, Quebec.

== Background ==
Forcillo had Italian ancestry and had a degree from the École nationale d'administration publique (ENAP).

== Civic Party ==
Forcillo was a member of Jean Drapeau's Civic Party. He was elected to Montreal's City Council in 1978 in Saint-Jacques, a district with a significant number of gay residents. He was re-elected in 1982, but was defeated by RCM candidate Raymond Blain in 1986. In November 1992 though, he won a by-election in the same district following Blain's death in office.

== Vision Montreal ==
When the Civic Party ceased to exist and merged with Jérôme Choquette's Parti des Montréalais (Montrealers’ Party), Forcillo decided to support Pierre Bourque and join Vision Montreal. He was re-elected in 1994 and became Deputy Chairman of Montreal Executive Committee.

== Team Montreal ==
In 1997 he was asked to resign from the Executive Committee. He left Vision Montreal and sat as an Independent, but refused to leave the Executive Committee.

In 1998 he first announced that he would support Jacques Duchesneau for Mayor, but eventually changed his mind. He ended up being re-elected as a candidate for Jean Doré's Équipe Montréal (Team Montreal).

== Union Montreal ==
In 2000 Forcillo sat again as an Independent and joined Gérald Tremblay's Montreal Island Citizens Union (French: Union des citoyens et des citoyennes de l’Île de Montréal or UCIM; the party is now known as Union Montréal).

Forcillo lost against Vision Montreal's candidate Robert Laramée in 2001, but was re-elected in 2005 representing the merged district of Sainte-Marie—Saint-Jacques.

He was a Member of Montreal's Executive Committee thereafter until his death.

On 25 June 2008, Tremblay named Forcillo as the Executive Member responsible for the city's finances following a re-organization that was made necessary following the resignation of the president of the Executive Council, Frank Zampino.

Forcillo ran again in the 2009 Montreal municipal election for Union Montréal in the adjacent district of Peter-McGill.

== Retirement and death ==
Forcillo announced on 30 August 2013 that he would not be running again in the municipal elections on 3 November 2013.

Forcillo died on 9 April 2026, at the age of 75.

== See also ==
- Vision Montreal Crisis, 1997

Political offices
Preceded by Raymond Blain (RCM)	City Councillor, District of Saint-Jacques; 1992–2001	Succeeded by Robert Laramée (Vision Montreal)
Preceded by Position created	City Councillor, District of Sainte-Marie—Saint-Jacques; 2005–2009	Succeeded by Position abolished
