= Marcel Tremblay (Montreal politician) =

Marcel Tremblay is a Canadian politician and a City Councillor in Montreal, Quebec. He ran as a Civic Party of Montreal candidate to the City Council in a 1991 by-election in the district of Notre-Dame-de-Grâce but lost.

In the wake of the province-wide Municipal Merger of 2001, Tremblay ran as a candidate for his brother's Gérald Tremblay's Montreal Island Citizens Union (French: Union des citoyens et des citoyennes de l’Île de Montréal or UCIM) in the district De Décarie. The party is now known as Union Montreal. Tremblay won the election over Vision Montreal incumbent Sonya Biddle.

He was re-elected in 2005, representing the district of Notre-Dame-de-Grâce.

Instead of seeking his incumbent seat in the 2009 Montreal municipal election, he ran for borough mayor of Villeray–Saint-Michel–Parc-Extension, where he was defeated by Anie Samson of Vision Montréal. His former city council seat was won by Peter McQueen of Projet Montréal.

== Electoral record ==
2005 Montreal municipal election: Councillor, Notre-Dame-de-Grâce
Party	Candidate	Votes	%
Montreal Island Citizens Union	Marcel Tremblay (incumbent)	3,414	49.90
Team Jeremy Searle	Robert Dupont	1,368	20.00
Projet Montréal	Jeff Itcush	1,152	16.84
Vision Montreal	Thomas Snabl	907	13.26
Total valid votes		6,841	100
Source: City of Montreal official results (in French), City of Montreal.

2001 Montreal municipal election: Councillor, Décarie
Party	Candidate	Votes	%
Montreal Island Citizens Union	Marcel Tremblay	3,792	61.66
Vision Montreal	Sonya Biddle (incumbent)	2,358	38.34
Total valid votes		6,150	100
Source: Election results, 1833-2005 (in French), City of Montreal.
