= Eloyan =

Eloyan (Armenian: Էլոյան) is an Armenian surname. Notable people with the surname include:

- Arayik Eloyan (born 2004), Armenian footballer
- Noushig Eloyan (fl. from 1976), Canadian politician
