= Noushig Eloyan =

Canadian politician

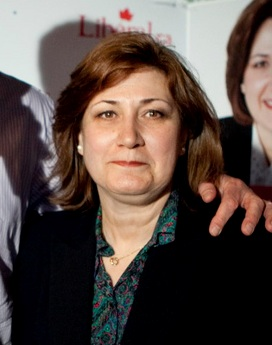
Eloyan in 2011

Noushig Eloyan is a Canadian politician, who served on the Montreal City Council from 1994 to 2009 and ran for the Canadian Parliament for the electoral riding of Ahuntsic in the May 2, 2011 elections as a member of the federal Liberal Party of Canada.

== Background ==
Eloyan was born in Syria and immigrated to Canada in 1976. She is of Armenian descent.

== Member of the Bourque administration ==
In 1994 she ran for a seat on the city council under the Vision Montreal banner in the district of Acadie. She won with 45 per cent of the vote as Pierre Bourque became Mayor of Montreal. She served as Montreal's chairperson of the executive committee from 1994 to 1998. She was re-elected in 1998 with 58 per cent of the vote.

== Leader of the Opposition ==
Even though Vision Montreal lost the 2001 election, Eloyan managed to win re-election as city councillor. She ran in the district of Cartierville and received 53% of the vote. She served as borough mayor of Ahuntsic-Cartierville until 2005. She was re-elected to the council with 49% of the ballots in that same year in the district of Bordeaux-Cartierville.

When Bourque retired from politics in May 2006, Eloyan became Leader of the Opposition.

In May 2008, she confirmed her desire to leave office as leader of the opposition in Montreal and was replaced by Benoit Labonté, then borough mayor of Ville-Marie. She did not run again in the 2009 Montreal municipal election, and her seat was taken by Harout Chitilian of Union Montréal.

== Electoral record (incomplete) ==
2011 Canadian federal election
| Party | Candidate | Votes | % | ±% | Expenditures |
|---|---|---|---|---|---|
| Bloc Québécois | Maria Mourani | 14,908 | 31.80 | -7.68 | |
| New Democratic | Chantal Reeves | 14,200 | 30.29 | +21.32 | |
| Liberal | Noushig Eloyan | 13,087 | 27.91 | -10.68 | |
| Conservative | Constantin Kiryakidis | 3,770 | 8.04 | -2.32 | |
| Green | Ted Kouretas | 620 | 1.32 | -1.25 | |
| Rhinoceros | Jean-Olivier Berthiaume | 299 | 0.64 | – | |
| Total valid votes/Expense limit | | 46,884 | 100.00 | | |
| Total rejected ballots | | 516 | 1.09 | - | |
| Turnout | | 47,400 | 64.98 | -0.66 | |
| Bloc Québécois hold | | Swing | | -14.50 | |

2005 Montreal municipal election: Councillor, Bordeaux-Cartierville division
| Party | Candidate | Votes | % |
|---|---|---|---|
| Vision Montreal | (x)Noushig Eloyan | 4,136 | 49.44 |
| Montreal Island Citizens Union | James Kromida | 3,648 | 43.61 |
| Projet Montréal | Annik Collin | 582 | 6.96 |
| Total valid votes | | 8,366 | 100 |
Source: Election results, 1833-2005 (in French), City of Montreal.

== Footnotes ==
Political offices
| Preceded by Léa Cousineau (RCM) | Chairperson of the Executive Committee; 1994-1998 | Succeeded by Jean Fortier (Vision Montreal) |
