= Monique Worth =

Borough mayor for Pierrefonds-Roxboro and Montreal City Councillor
- In office January 1, 2005 – November 3, 2013
- Preceded by: Position created

Borough mayor for Pierrefonds-Senneville and Montreal City Councillor
- In office January 1, 2002 – December 31, 2004
- Preceded by: Position created
- Succeeded by: Position abolished

Personal details
- Born: May 21, 1944 (age 81) Verdun, Quebec
- Party: Union Montréal (2001-2013); Independent (2013)

Monique Worth (born May 21, 1944) is a former city councillor from Montreal, Quebec, Canada. She served as the borough mayor for Pierrefonds-Senneville from 2002 to 2005, and of Pierrefonds-Roxboro from 2005 to 2013. She was a member of the Union Montreal municipal political party. She sat on the city of Montreal's executive committee where she was responsible for the portfolios of sustainable development, the environment, the exoterritories and blue spaces.

Her career in politics began in 1989, following the death of her husband, Harry, a city councillor with the former city of Pierrefonds. The mayor at the time, Marcel Morin, urged her to campaign for her husband's former seat. She was would be elected in February 1990 and had sat on Pierrefonds city council until its merger with Montreal in 2001. After the merger, she was appointed borough mayor of the Pierrefonds-Senneville borough because she had the largest number of votes. Following Senneville's demerger from the city of Montreal, the borough's borders were altered and the name changed to Pierrefonds-Roxboro.

A native of the borough of Verdun, Worth formerly worked in the pharmaceutical industry for 22 years and was at one time a political attaché to Pierre Marsan of the Quebec Liberal Party.

== Municipal election history ==
2009 Montreal municipal election, Borough of Pierrefonds-Roxboro
Candidate	Party	Vote	%
Monique Worth (incumbent)	Union Montréal	7,065	53.22%
Michel Labelle	Projet Montréal	4,483	33.77%
Latif Zaki	Vision Montreal	1,728	13.02%
	Total rejected ballots	378	
	Total	13,654	100%
