= Jacques Duchesneau =

Canadian politician

Jacques Duchesneau CM COM CQ
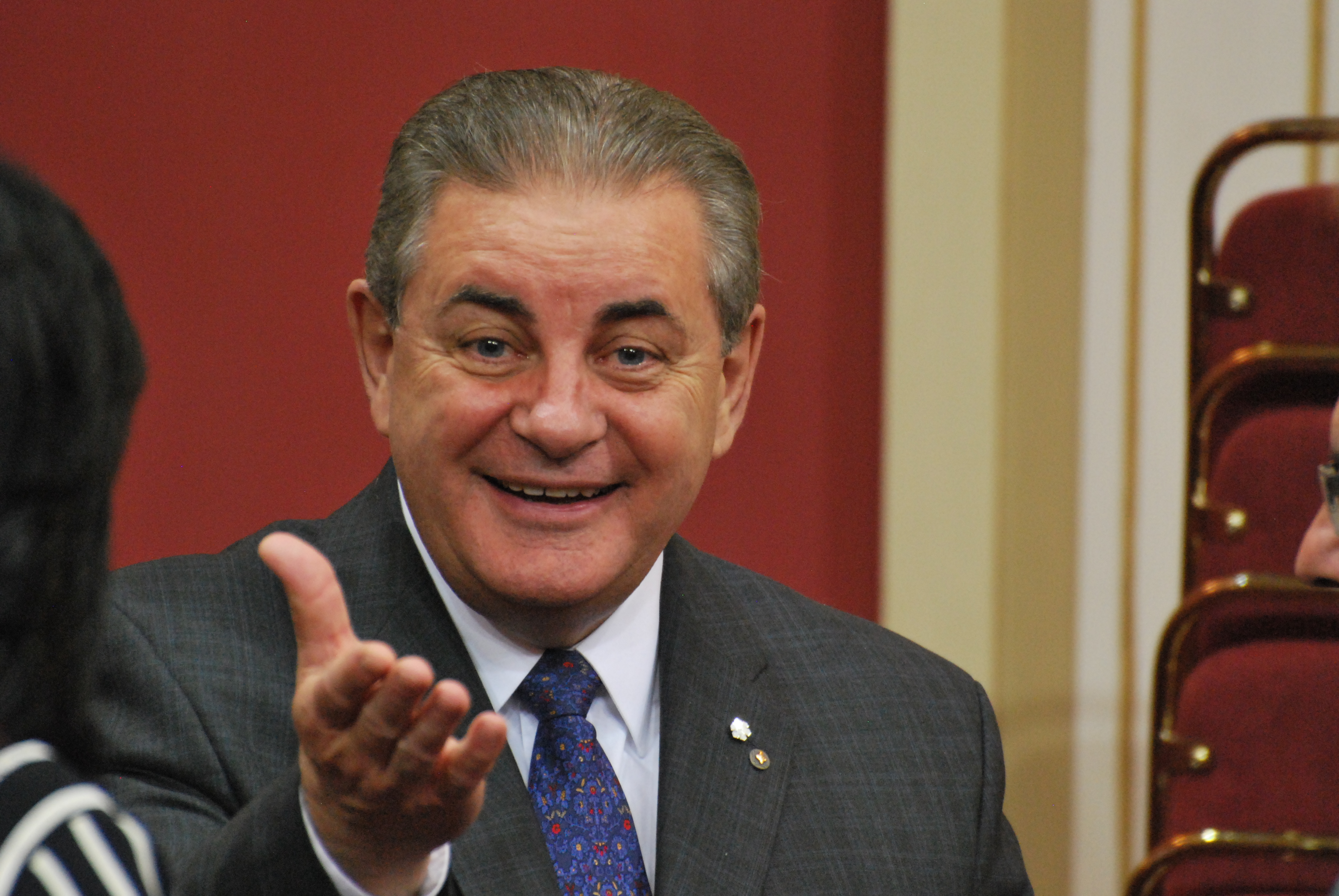
- Jacques Duchesneau in 2013

MNA for Saint-Jérôme
- In office September 19, 2012 – 2014
- Preceded by: Position created
- Succeeded by: Pierre Karl Péladeau

Chief of the Montreal Police Service
- In office 1994–1998
- Preceded by: Alain Saint-Germain
- Succeeded by: Michel Sarrazin

President and CEO of Canadian Air Transport Security Authority
- In office 2002–2008
- Preceded by: None - new post
- Succeeded by: Kevin McGarr

Personal details
- Born: February 7, 1949 (age 77) Montreal, Quebec, Canada
- Party: Coalition Avenir Québec
- Education: Université de Montréal; École nationale d'administration publique
- Profession: Civil servant Police chief

Jacques Duchesneau, CM COM CQ MSM CD (born February 7, 1949) is a Canadian politician, civil servant, former chief of police, and former president and chief executive officer of the Canadian Air Transport Security Authority. Duchesneau was a member of the Quebec National Assembly for the riding of Saint-Jérôme from 2012 to 2014, elected under the Coalition Avenir Québec banner.

== Background ==
He holds a bachelor of science degree from the Université de Montréal, a master's degree in public administration from the École nationale d'administration publique, and is in the process of completing a doctorate degree at the Royal Military College of Canada.

== Career ==
Duchesneau began his career at the Montreal Urban Community Police Service (SPCUM) in 1968. He first appeared in the public eye in 1981, when as a young sergeant-detective, he arrested his own boss for stealing drugs from the evidence locker. From 1994 to 1998, he commanded the SPCUM and simultaneously served as treasurer of the International Centre for the Prevention of Crime, vice-president of the Canadian Association of Chiefs of Police, and president of the Quebec Association of Police Directors. After retiring from his police career in 1998, he campaigned to become the Mayor of Montreal with his party Nouveau Montréal, finishing second with 26% of the vote, behind incumbent Pierre Bourque (44%) but ahead of former Mayor Jean Doré (10%). After losing the race and failing to secure a seat as city councillor, he retreated to the private sector.

In 2002, he was appointed as the first president and chief executive officer (CEO) of the Canadian Air Transport Security Authority, a then newly formed Canadian Crown Corporation in response to the events of 9/11. Duchesneau retired from CATSA in 2008 to become an adjunct professor in the faculty of social science at the University of Ontario Institute of Technology.

Duchesneau entered the public eye again in early 2010, when the Quebec provincial government, shaken by corruption scandals, appointed him to lead an anti-collusion unit within the Transport Ministry, which would eventually be integrated within the larger Permanent Anti-Corruption Unit (UPAC). In the fall of 2011, Duchesneau leaked to the media a devastating 88-page report documenting cases of corruption and describing an entangled web of links between construction companies, organized crime, Transport Quebec and political donations. He was fired a month later. Testifying on June 14, 2012 in the inquiry of the Charbonneau commission, whose mission is to probe the corruption in Quebec’s construction industry, regarding his motive to leak the report, Duchesneau said he feared his findings would be shelved, arguing the then transport minister, Sam Hamad, showed ‘complete disinterest’ in the report.

On August 5, 2012, five days after the start of the provincial election campaign, Duchesneau confirmed that he was going to run as a star candidate for the upstart Coalition Avenir Québec, led by François Legault. His candidacy was said to be a 'game-changer' in the election. He subsequently won a seat as an MNA in the riding of Saint-Jérôme.

== Other activities ==
Duchesneau is a commissioned officer of the Canadian Forces, who served as honorary colonel of the Canadian Forces Military Police and as honorary lieutenant-colonel of the 62nd (Shawinigan) Field Artillery Regiment (Royal Canadian Artillery). He also served on the board of directors of the Canadian Red Cross. He has written articles on security, terrorism, organized crime, drug trafficking, police ethics, and leadership.

== Honours ==

- In 1989, he was awarded the Police Exemplary Service Medal for 20 years of service as a police officer. He received the first clasp 10 years later in 1999.
- In 1996, he was made a Member of the Order of Canada;
- In 2001, he was knighted by the Venerable Order of Saint John;
- In 2002 he received Queen Elizabeth II’s Golden Jubilee Medal;
- In 2006, he was made a Knight of the French Ordre National du Mérite.
- In 2008, he was made a Knight of the National Order of Québec.
- In 2012, he received the Queen Elizabeth II Diamond Jubilee Medal.
- In 2018, he was made an Officer of the Order of Merit of the Police Forces. He was promoted to Commander in 2023.
- On 3 May 2022, he was awarded with the Meritorious Service Medal (Canada) in the civilian division. The citation reads as follows:
  Catherine Bergeron, Jacques Duchesneau, Romain Gayet, Annie-Clara Gravel, Michel Petit and Florence Scanvic have distinguished themselves by their outstanding involvement with the Comité Mémoire, formed in the wake of the École Polytechnique de Montréal tragedy. They have worked tirelessly to pay tribute to the 14 victims of December 6, 1989. They played a decisive role in organizing the 30th anniversary commemoration, notable for the participation of 13 Canadian universities, elevating the ceremony to the status of a major national movement and amplifying the message condemning violence against women."
  His investure ceremony took place on 21 March 2024.
- On 17 January 2024, he was awarded with the Vice-Regal Commendation by outgoing Lieutenant Governor of Quebec, the Honourable J. Michel Doyon.

== Electoral record (incomplete) ==
1998 Montreal municipal election: Councillor, Ahuntsic
Party	Candidate	Votes	%
Vision Montreal	Hasmig Belleli (incumbent)	3,900	50.04
New Montreal	Jimmy V. Capogreco co-listed with Jacques Duchesneau	2,119	27.19
Team Montreal	Pierre Veilleux	793	10.17
Montreal Citizens' Movement	Renée Millette	754	9.67
Democratic Coalition	Néomie Larocque de Roquebrune	137	1.76
Montreal 2000	Yvan Tremblay	91	1.17
Total valid votes		7,794	100.00
Source: Official Results, City of Montreal.
