= Vision Montreal Crisis, 1997 =

1997 Canadian political party crisis

The Vision Montreal Crisis of 1997 was a severe political crisis in Montreal, Canada. In January the mayor of Montreal, Pierre Bourque of the Vision Montreal Party, attempted to dismiss two fellow party members from the city's executive committee. This led several party members to defect, complicating governance and undermining party credibility for the remainder of Bourque's term.

== Origins ==
In January 1997, Mayor Pierre Bourque tried to dismiss two members of Montreal's executive committee: Deputy Chairman Sammy Forcillo and Pierre Goyer. Yet, the city charter of 1921 clearly states that appointments to the executive committee are irrevocable. Forcillo and Goyer left Vision Montreal (Bourque's party) to sit as independents, but exercised their right to stay on the committee. Therefore, management by consensus became nearly impossible to reach for the remainder of Bourque's term.

That incident as well as allegations of authoritarian tendencies led thirteen other Vision Montreal councillors to leave the party and sit as independents with their colleagues of the opposition.

== Consequences ==
By August 1997, only a minority of the council members (24 out of 51) were members of Vision Montreal and the credibility of the Bourque administration was undermined. Most of the defectors were supporters of Jacques Duchesneau's Nouveau Montréal party, but others backed Jean Doré's Équipe Montréal, the RCM or even came back to Vision Montreal briefly before the next election. The severity of the crisis was such that for a while it appeared to seriously affect Bourque's chances of re-election.

Nonetheless, Bourque was re-elected in 1998, as were a substantial majority of his candidates.

== Defectors ==
The defectors were:

Councilmember	District	Status following the 1998 Election
Serge-Éric Bélanger	Sault-au-Récollet	Re-elected as a Vision Montreal candidate
Philippe Bissonnette	Saint-Paul	Elected as a Nouveau Montréal candidate
Daniel Boucher	Jean-Rivard	Defeated as an Independent candidate
Vittorio Capparelli	François-Perrault	Defeated as an RCM candidate
Jack Chadirdjian	Darlington	Defeated as a Nouveau Montréal candidate
Jacques Charbonneau	Louis-Riel	Re-elected as a Vision Montreal candidate
Hubert Deraspe	Louis-Hébert	Did not run for re-election
Sammy Forcillo	Saint-Jacques	Elected as an Équipe Montréal candidate
Pierre Gagnier	Cartierville	Defeated as a Nouveau Montréal candidate
Robert Gagnon	Émard	Defeated as an Independent candidate
Pierre Goyer	Saint-Édouard	Defeated as an Équipe Montréal candidate
Robert Laramée	Père-Marquette	Defeated as a Nouveau Montréal candidate
Marie Lebeau	Pointe-aux-Trembles	Defeated as a Nouveau Montréal candidate
Martin Lemay	Sainte-Marie	Defeated as an Équipe Montréal candidate
Nathalie Malépart	Maisonneuve	Did not run for re-election
Germain Prégent	Saint-Pierre	Elected as a Nouveau Montréal candidate

Members of the executive committee are indicated with bold fonts.
