= Alan DeSousa =

Canadian politician

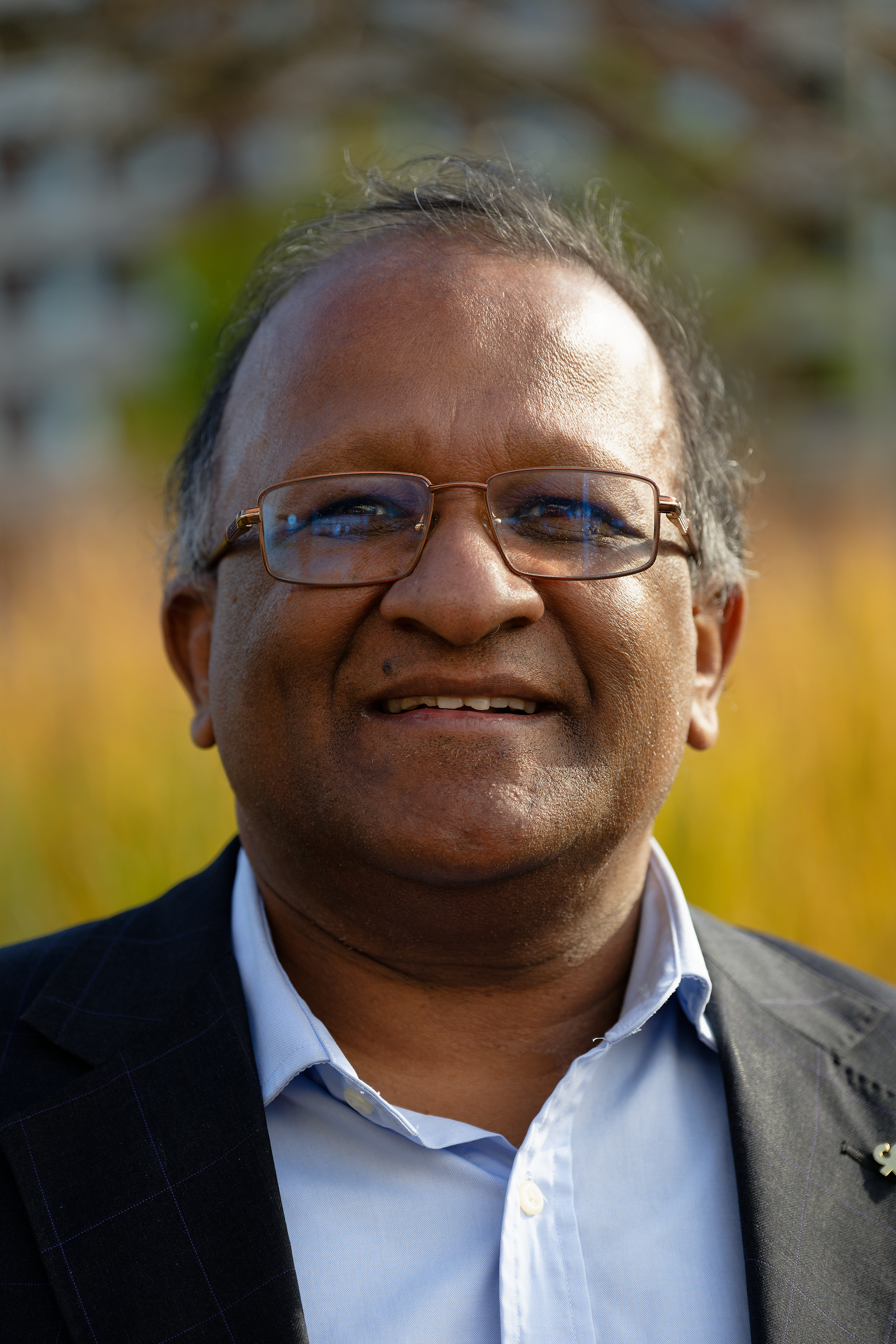
- Alan DeSousa, October 2023

Vice-chair of the Montreal Executive Committee
- Incumbent
- Assumed office November 2009

Borough mayor for Saint-Laurent and Montreal City Councillor
- Incumbent
- Assumed office January 1, 2002
- Preceded by: Position created

Personal details
- Born: 1959 (age 66–67) Pakistan
- Party: Union Montreal (2001-2013); Ensemble Montréal (2013-)
- Spouse: Florence Beaudet
- Children: Martin, Victor
- Education: McGill University
- Occupation: Chartered Accountant

Alan DeSousa (born 1959) is a city councillor from Montreal, Quebec, Canada. He is also the borough mayor of Saint-Laurent, and the former chairman of the Montreal Executive Committee. He is currently vice-chairman in charge of sustainable development, the environment, parks and green spaces.

He was a member of the Union Montreal majority municipal party until its dissolution in 2013.

By profession he is a chartered accountant.

On June 19, 2013, he declared himself a candidate for the job of interim mayor of Montreal after the resignation of Michael Applebaum. However, in the council session on June 25 to select the new interim mayor, DeSousa withdrew his candidacy before the vote, endorsing Harout Chitilian.

== Background ==
Born in Pakistan to a Roman Catholic family, his family immigrated to Canada when he was a teenager. Alan DeSousa has lived in Saint-Laurent for over 35 years. He is married to Florence Beaudet and has two sons, Martin and Victor. DeSousa completed a Bachelor of Commerce from McGill University in 1981. DeSousa also graduated from Vanier College in 1978 with a Commerce degree.

By profession DeSousa is a chartered accountant. In 1984, he was named to the Ordre des comptables agréés du Québec, and in 2005 was given the honorary title of Fellow.

He has previously served as Vice-President, Corporate Finance, of BioChem Pharma, and has worked at Ernst & Young as an expert on corporate and international taxation.

Prior to its merger with Montreal, DeSousa was a city councillor with the former city of Saint-Laurent since 1990. In November 2001, he became borough mayor of Saint-Laurent, a position that he has retained for five consecutive terms. He serves on Montreal's Executive Committee, with the responsibility of sustainable development. In 2004, economic development was added to his responsibilities.
