= Richard Bélanger =

Canadian politician

Richard Belanger

Borough mayor for L'Île-Bizard–Sainte-Geneviève and Montreal City Councillor
- In office January 1, 2006 – November 13, 2013
- Preceded by: Position created
- Succeeded by: Normand Marinacci

Personal details
- Born: Unknown ?
- Died: Unknown
- Party: Union Montréal (2006-2012); Independent (2013-)

Richard Bélanger was a city councillor from Montreal, Quebec, Canada. He served as the borough mayor of L'Île-Bizard–Sainte-Geneviève from 2005 to 2013.

Bélanger was a member of the Union Montreal municipal political party until November 23, 2012, when he resigned from UM, along with the entire borough council.

Bélanger is a native of Île Bizard, and was a city councillor since 1991.
