= Coalition Démocratique–Montréal Écologique =

Political party in Montreal, Quebec, Canada

Coalition Démocratique–Montréal Écologique (English: Democratic Coalition–Ecology Montreal) was a municipal political party that existed from 1994 to 1998 in Montreal, Quebec, Canada. The party was initially led by Yolande Cohen, who was also its candidate for mayor in the 1994 municipal election.

== Origins ==
As its name implies, the party was formed by a merger of two pre-existing political parties: the Democratic Coalition and Ecology Montreal. These groups had a history of co-operation prior to the merger. Both parties were formed as breakaway groups from the left wing of the governing Montreal Citizens' Movement (MCM) in late 1989, and they had refrained from running candidates against one another in the mayoral contest and most council races of the 1990 municipal election.

The Democratic Coalition won three seats in the 1990 election and added another seat in a 1991 by-election. Two of the party's councillors subsequently resigned to sit as independents in 1992; one of the councillors argued that the Democratic Coalition had become dominated by anglophone interests, while the other said that its leadership would not tolerate differences of opinion. Ecology Montreal did not win any seats in the 1990 election and was largely inactive from 1990 to 1994.

The two parties announced plans for an official merger in June 1994, both to overcome the Democratic Coalition's internal divisions and to create a larger political movement on the municipal left. The merger was approved by Quebec's chief electoral official on August 23, 1994. The Democratic Coalition and Ecology Montreal initially continued as autonomous movements within the merged party, which was overseen by a six-member executive with representatives from both organizations.

The party's founding members included Democratic Coalition councillors Marvin Rotrand and Sam Boskey. Its mayoral candidate, Yolande Cohen, had previously been a member of Ecology Montreal (whose former leader, Dimitri Roussopoulos, was a supporter of the merger).

== Platform ==
Democratic Coalition–Ecology Montreal's 1994 campaign stressed the need for ordinary Montrealers to take a more active role in city governance and to have greater oversight of municipal services. The party promised to create neighbourhood councils that would have real powers over local services and to replace the regional Montreal Urban Community's public security commission with a new body that would allow increased civilian oversight of the police. The party also promised to extend curbside recycling services to the entire city, spend one per cent of the city's municipal budget on the arts, create 1,200 units of low-income housing, and restructure the Montreal Urban Community as a smaller, elected body in which the city would have more power relative to the Island of Montreal's suburban communities.

== Results ==
Cohen finished fourth in the mayoral contest, a result that was consistent with polls taken throughout the campaign. Rotrand and Boskey were re-elected, but Democratic Coalition–Ecology Montreal did not win any further seats.

== Aftermath ==
Democratic Coalition–Ecology Montreal formally continued to exist for four years after the election. Boskey and Rotrand remained prominent members of council, actively opposing new mayor Pierre Bourque's plans to eliminate Montreal's district advisory committees in late 1994 and later urging an investigation into allegations of illegal contributions to the governing Vision Montreal party.

On March 22, 1998, the two parties announced that they would dissolve their union. The Democratic Coalition became a standalone party once again, while Ecology Montreal seems to have discontinued its activities.
