= Équipe Montréal =

Équipe Montréal (English: Team Montreal) was a municipal political party that existed from 1998 to 2001 in Montreal, Quebec, Canada. It was founded by Jean Doré, a former leader of the Montreal Citizens' Movement (MCM) who served as mayor of Montreal from 1986 to 1994.

== Origins ==
Doré, who resigned from the MCM in 1997, announced Équipe Montréal's formation at a press conference on 27 April 1998. He acknowledged having made mistakes that led to his former party's defeat in the 1994 municipal election, saying, "I became more of a spokesperson for the apparatus, the bureaucracy, rather than for the interests of the citizens." He promised to govern "more from my heart" and to pursue a policy of economic renewal if returned to office. Doré also promised that his party would freeze and eventually reduce municipal taxes, simplify government services, and restore Montreal's cleanliness, while remaining neutral on the issue of Quebec nationalism. When asked if he still identified as a social democrat, Doré responded that his party would govern from a position of pragmatism.

Two sitting councillors, Pierre Goyer and Martin Lemay, were present for the party's official launch. Councillors Helen Fotopulos and Sammy Forcillo also joined over the following months, as did former councillor Scott McKay and former Coalition Démocratique et Montréal Écologique party leader Yolande Cohen. All were candidates in the 1998 municipal election.

Doré did not initially plan for Équipe Montréal to release an election platform, and some critics charged that the party was more an electoral vehicle centered around the former mayor's personality than a proper political party. Doré rejected this, saying that the party was "born out of necessity" and was "not a closed political club." Équipe Montréal held a founding convention in June 1998 that was attended by about five hundred people and released a platform after a follow-up convention in August.

== Policies ==
Many of Équipe Montréal's election promises were focused on tax reform, as Doré sought to position himself as a pro-business candidate. At the party's August convention, Doré promised to lobby the provincial government for Montreal and other metropolitan centres to receive a percentage of Quebec's sales tax, so as to make the city less dependent on property taxes. He also promised to eliminate Montreal's non-residential property surtax (a policy he had introduced in 1993), reduce residential property tax rates by at least 10 per cent in four years, and consider forming partnerships with private corporations and neighbouring municipalities.

The party was more liberal on social issues. Doré promised that he would eliminate guaranteed permanent employment in the upper levels of Montreal's bureaucracy, so as to create more diversity in the municipal workforce. Saying that Montreal's drug problem required a bold solution, he argued that heroin should be legalized and regulated such that addicts could receive it in a controlled setting while having access to methadone programs. On heritage issues, he promised to renew the Urban Plan that he first introduced in 1992.

Doré also promised that Équipe Montréal would decentralize the city's municipal services, giving neighbourhoods greater control over recreation and sports facilities.

== The 1998 election ==
About a week before election day, faced with polls that showed him well behind incumbent mayor Pierre Bourque, Doré made the surprising announcement that he would consider withdrawing from the mayoral contest to support rival candidate Jacques Duchesneau, leader of the New Montreal party, in a bid to prevent Bourque's re-election. Doré ultimately chose to remain in the contest, but it was generally accepted that his remarks damaged his campaign.

Doré finished fourth in the mayoral contest with about 10 per cent of the popular vote, as Pierre Bourque was elected to a second term in office. Helen Fotopulos and Sammy Forcillo were the only Équipe Montréal candidates returned to council. In his concession speech, Doré described his defeat as "extremely disappointing."

== Dissolution ==
Doré resigned as Équipe Montréal leader in March 1999, saying that he would not be a candidate for mayor in 2002. Both Fotopulos and Forcillo resigned from the party to sit as independents in January 2000, with Fotopulos remarking that the party had been "essentially rudderless" since the 1998 election. The party had $597,764 in debts at the end of 2000 and was officially dissolved by Quebec's chief electoral officer on 30 June 2001.
