= Benoît Labonté =

Benoît Labonté (born 28 December 1959) was a city councillor with the Vision Montréal party in Montreal, Quebec, Canada. He was the mayor of the borough of Ville-Marie until 2009. He was in favour of the merger of all Montreal Island municipalities into the megacity.

Labonté, a former head of the Board of Trade of Metropolitan Montreal, is a Canadian federalist. He once worked as an aide to former finance minister Paul Martin of the Liberal Party of Canada.

Previously a member of the Union Montreal municipal party, he left and joined Vision Montréal following a dispute with Montreal mayor Gérald Tremblay. Following this, Tremblay prevailed upon the Quebec government to abolish the position of Ville-Marie borough mayor as a separate elected position, merging it with the office of mayor of Montreal.

Labonté remained leader of Montreal's opposition party, Vision Montreal, until the municipal election of November 2009, when he resigned in favour of Louise Harel for mayor, running instead for city council in the district of Sainte-Marie. On October 17, 2009 he resigned as head of the official opposition after published reports of him taking $100,000 from Montreal developer Tony Accurso to fund his bid.
