= Harout Chitilian =

Canadian politician

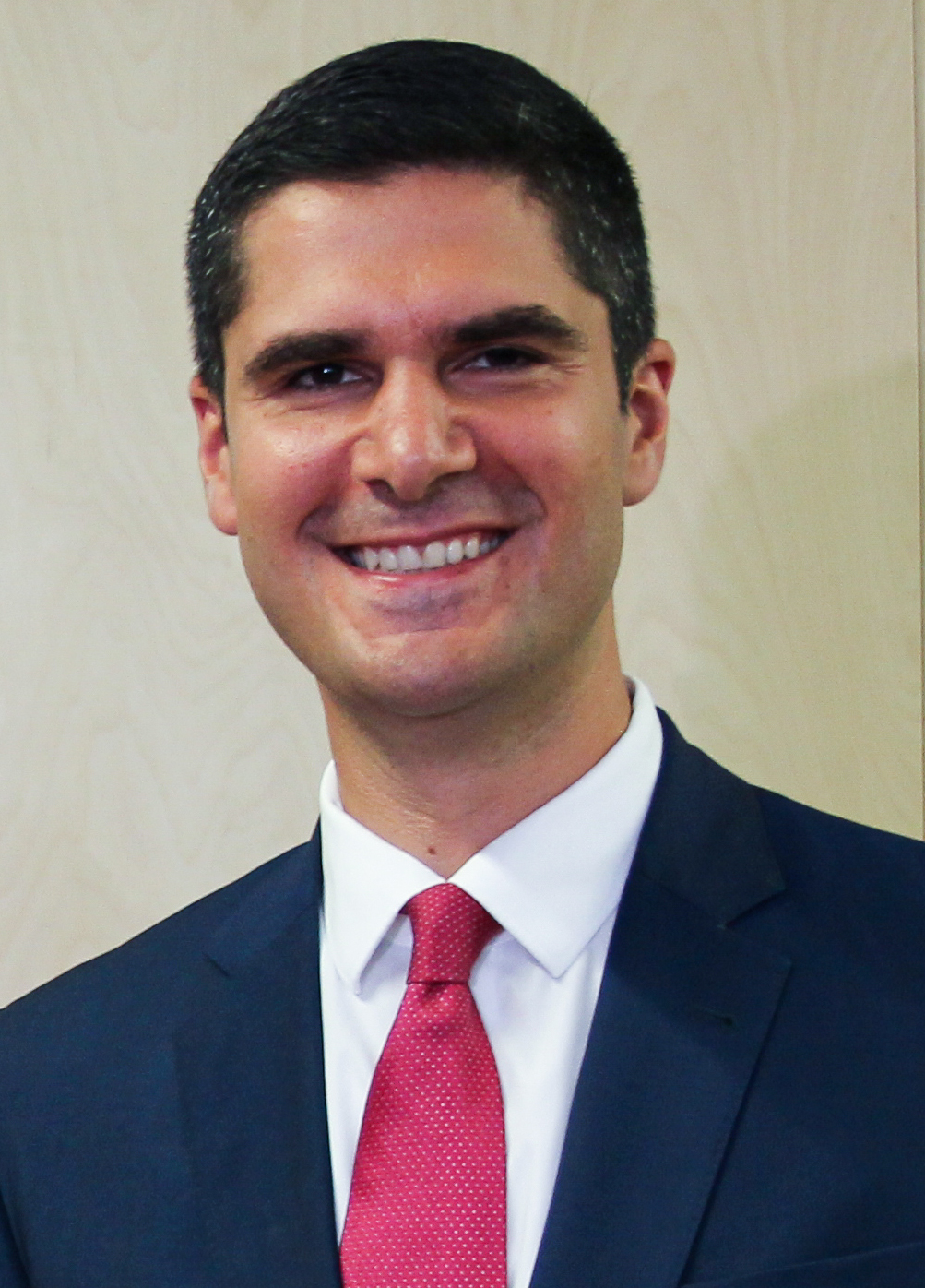
- Harout Chitilian in 2016.

Former City councillor of Bordeaux-Cartierville, borough of Ahuntsic-Cartierville
- In office November 2009 – November 2017
- Preceded by: Noushig Eloyan
- Succeeded by: Effie Giannou

Harout Chitilian (Armenian: Հարութ Շիթիլեան) (born in 1980 in Beirut, Lebanon) is a former city councillor from Montreal, Quebec, Canada, former chairman of the council, he held the position of vice president of the executive committee of Montreal city until his electoral defeat in November 2017.

Originally elected as a member of Union Montreal, Chitilian sat as an independent councillor from December 2012 to August 2013, when he reaffiliated with the new Équipe Denis Coderre.

== Biography ==
Born in Beirut, Lebanon to parents of Lebanese-Armenian origin, he immigrated to Canada when he was nine years old. After studying at AGBU's École Alex-Manoogian in Montreal, he completed his high school studies at a French language school in the west of Montreal while participating in the city of Montreal sports programs in swimming, water polo and basketball. In 2004, he graduated with a degree in engineering, specializing in telecommunication, from the École Polytechnique de Montréal.

After graduation, he worked for four years with the Swedish firm Ericsson, as an international consultant working for various periods in Latin America, Scandinavian countries, Western Europe, United States. From 2007 to 2009, he ran a private consultancy business specializing in the domain of information technology and telecommunication.

In 2009 municipal elections, he was elected municipal councillor in the Montreal borough (arrondissement) of Ahuntsic-Cartierville under the banner of Union Montreal from the electoral district of Bordeaux-Cartierville.

From 2009 until June 2011, he was the president of the municipal council at the City of Montreal, head of the commission of presidency of the city and vice-president of the Consultative Committee of Urbanism in the borough. He was also a member of the executive committee of the Regional Conference of Elected Councilors of Montreal, of the Corporation de Développement économique et communautaire de l’arrondissement Ahuntsic-Cartierville and Administrative Council of the organisation "MR3 Relève".

On June 20, 2011, he was elected chairman of the city council of Montreal, Quebec, Canada, replacing the outgoing chairman Claude Dauphin, and at 30 years was the youngest chairman in the history of the city of Montreal.

In December 2012, he announced he was quitting Union Montreal without joining any other party, but preferring to become an independent councillor.

Following the resignation of Michael Applebaum in June 2013, Chitilian was a candidate in the council vote to succeed Applebaum as interim Mayor of Montreal, but lost narrowly to Laurent Blanchard.

On November 18, 2013, he got appointed vice-president of the executive committee, in charge of administrative reform, Smart City, technology & information.

Chitilian lost his seat in the 2017 municipal general election and has become a director of CDPQ Infra, the subsidiary of Quebec's Caisse de dépôt created to manage construction of Montreal's REM light rail system.

Between December 2024 and April 2026, Harout Chitilian was General Manager of ATUQ, representing Québec's ten public urban transit authorities.

== Electoral record ==
2009 Montreal municipal election: Councillor, Bordeaux-Cartierville
Party	Candidate	Votes	%
Union Montreal	Harout Chitilian	3,040	37.71
Vision Montreal	(x)Hasmig Belleli	2,578	31.98
Projet Montréal	Pericles Creticos	2,040	25.31
Parti Montréal Ville-Marie	John Gentile	403	5.00
Total valid votes		8,061	100
Source: Election results, 2009, City of Montreal.
