= Helen Fotopulos =

Helen Fotopulos was a member of the City of Montreal executive committee and Cote des Neiges (CDN) City Councillor.

She began in city politics with an unsuccessful run for office in 1978 for the Montreal Citizens' Movement in that city's Snowdon district.

After serving as the MCM's cultural and intercultural affairs adviser for six years, she ran in 1994 and was elected councilor for Mile End, Having left the MCM in 1997 she joined Jean Doré's Equipe Montréal and was re-elected in 1998.

In 2001 she joined with Gérald Tremblay to form Union Montréal and won three straight elections. She served two terms as Plateau-Mont-Royal borough mayor and was then CDN city councilor. She was the executive committee member responsible for culture, heritage and women's issues.

She was defeated in 2013.
