= Ahuntsic-Cartierville borough council =

Local governing body in Montreal, Canada

The Ahuntsic-Cartierville borough council is the local governing body of Ahuntsic-Cartierville, a borough in the City of Montreal. The council consists of five members: the borough mayor (who also serves as a Montreal city councillor) and the city council representatives for each of the borough's four electoral districts.

== Current members ==
- Borough mayor: Émilie Thuillier (Projet Montréal)
- Montreal city councillor, Ahuntsic division: Nathalie Goulet (Projet Montréal)
- Montreal city councillor, Bordeaux-Cartierville division: Effie Giannou (Ensemble Montréal)
- Montreal city councillor, Saint-Sulpice division: Hadrien Parizeau (Ensemble Montréal)
- Montreal city councillor, Sault-au-Récollet division: Jérôme Normand (Projet Montréal)
