= Pierre Bourque (politician) =

Former mayor of Montreal, Quebec (1994–2001)

Pierre Bourque CQ
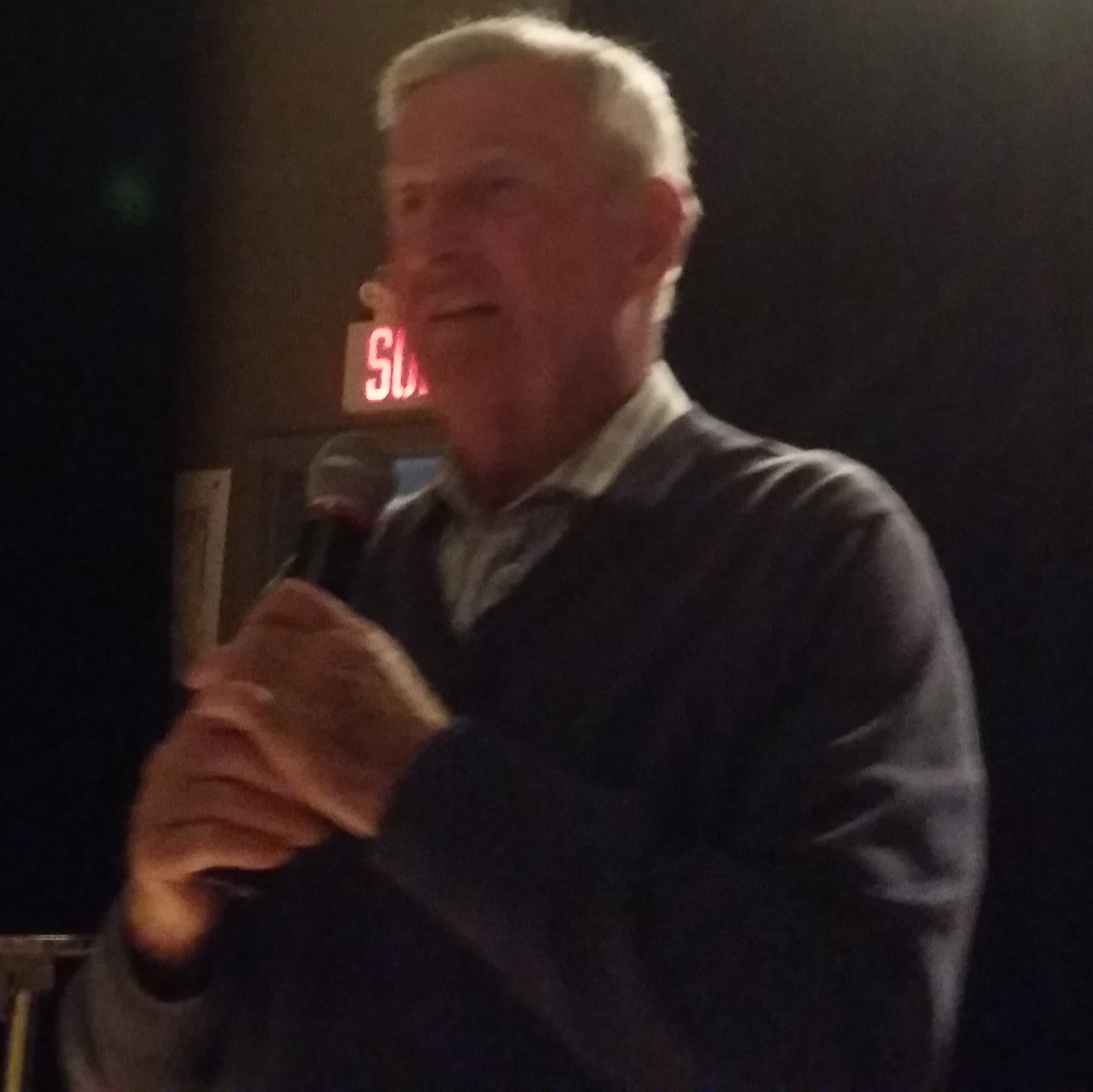

40th Mayor of Montreal
- In office 1994–2001
- Preceded by: Jean Doré
- Succeeded by: Gérald Tremblay
- Constituency: Marie-Victorin

Personal details
- Born: 29 May 1942 (age 83) Montreal, Quebec, Canada
- Party: Vision Montreal
- Other political affiliations: Action démocratique du Québec (2003)
- Profession: Businessman

Pierre Bourque CQ (born 29 May 1942) is a Canadian businessman and politician in Quebec. He founded the Vision Montreal political party and served as mayor of Montreal from 1994 to 2001.

== Background ==
He was director of the Montreal Botanical Gardens from 1980 to 1994.

== Mayor of Montreal ==
Bourque was the mayor of Montreal, Quebec from 1994 to 2001 (as the leader of the Vision Montreal party).

Bourque proved eccentric and sometimes controversial as mayor. Known as a greenspace aficionado, he supported the creation of parks, implemented tree-planting initiatives, as well as creating Eco-Centres (reusable materials) and Eco-Quartier program (recycling). He was also responsible for the revitalization of many important districts of Montreal (Saint Catherine Street, Old Montreal and the Multimedia City) as well as the reopening of the Lachine Canal.

In 1998, responding to critics who denounced him for not fighting poverty, he spent the night with a working-class family. He was also well known for his close ties to minority "cultural communities". Bourque directed the city's public service to make an intercultural calendar for meeting scheduling.

At one time, Bourque was a moderate supporter of the sovereigntist Parti Québécois. Bourque's successful attempt, with provincial support, at merging all of Montreal's 28 municipalities into a megacity of 1.8 million people and 27 boroughs cost him the election in 2001. Although he gathered a majority of votes in the old city of Montreal, protest votes against the very principle of the merger in the former suburbs gave the victory to his rival Gérald Tremblay. Pierre Bourque still sat on the municipal council, taking his running mate Kettly Beauregard's spot.

== Provincial politics ==
He subsequently attempted to enter provincial politics, running as an Action démocratique du Québec candidate in the 2003 Quebec election, but was defeated. In Bourget, Bourque finished third, behind then minister Diane Lemieux (Parti Québécois) and the Liberal candidate. He then returned to municipal politics.

== Leader of the Opposition ==
Bourque lost for a second time to incumbent-mayor Gérald Tremblay to regain control of city hall in the Montreal municipal elections held on 6 November 2005, this time by a 74,646 vote margin. The voter turnout was less than 40%, among the lowest in Montreal's history.

On 3 May 2006, he stepped down as Leader of the Opposition on Montreal's city council.

== Retirement from public office ==
He co-founded a company, with former colleague Wen Qi, that was called Constellation Monde Inc. which operated in China in the agriculture field. Bourque wanted to develop further economic links between the country and the province. Years after, the company was left to Wen Qi and was renamed DXC Inc. This company now operates in the biotechnology department.

== Honours ==
- 1992 – Professional Citation, American Public Gardens Association.
- 1993 – National Order of Quebec.
- 2007 – Order of the Rising Sun, Gold Rays with Neck Ribbon (Japan).

== Municipal election history ==
Montreal municipal elections, 2005
Candidate	Party	Vote	%
Gérald Tremblay (X)	Montreal Island Citizens Union	227,208	53.9
Pierre Bourque	Vision Montreal	152,562	36.2
Richard Bergeron	Projet Montreal	35,889	8.5
Michel Bédard	White Elephant Party of Montreal	5,966	1.4

Political offices
Preceded by Kettly Beauregard (Vision Montreal)	City Councillor, District of Marie-Victorin; 2001–2006	Succeeded by Carle Bernier-Genest (Union Montreal)
Government offices
Preceded by André Champagne	Director of the Montreal Botanical Garden; 1980–1993	Succeeded by André Bouchard as Interim director
