= Vision Montreal =

Vision Montreal Vision Montréal
- Former municipal party
- Founded: April 19, 1994
- Dissolved: April 10, 2014
- Headquarters: 3430, rue Saint-Denis, bureau 300; Montreal, Quebec; H2X 3L3
- Youth wing: Comité jeunesse de Vision Montréal
- Ideology: Progressivism; Environmentalism; Localism; Internal factions: Local government consolidation Quebec nationalism
- Political position: Centre-left

Website
- www.visionmtl.com?lang=eng

Vision Montreal (French: Vision Montréal or VM) was a municipal political party in Montreal, Quebec, Canada. It was founded in 1994 and dissolved in April 2014. Between 2001 and 2013 it formed the official opposition on Montreal City Council.

== Origins ==
Vision Montreal was established in 1994 to promote the candidacy of the director of the Montreal Botanical Garden and then rising political star Pierre Bourque for Mayor of Montreal.

== Accomplishments ==
Bourque was elected Mayor against incumbent Jean Doré in 1994, with 39 of his candidates elected to Montreal City Council. In 1998, he and his team were re-elected for a second term.

The Bourque administration is credited with the following:

- the introduction of a balanced city budget, with the help of the provincial government in 1998;
- the revitalization of the Old Montreal historic district;
- the implementation of neighbourhood programs known as Éco-quartiers; such programs consist of:
  - recycling;
  - adding greenery on public property;
- the reopening of the Lachine Canal in 1997;
- the expansion of diplomatic and commercial relations between Montreal and Shanghai, China;
- a modest reversal of Montreal's suburbanization between 1996 and 2001;
- the merger of Montreal and 27 other surrounding municipalities into one city government that covers the entire island of Montreal in 2001-02 (an idea known as Une île, une ville or One island, one city in English).

== Shortcomings and criticism ==
Pierre Bourque was criticized for his perceived lack of flexibility. During his first term, he suffered a mutiny within his party. Fifteen of his councillors left his administration to sit as Independents. By August 1997, only a minority of city council members (24 out of 51) were members of Vision Montreal.

Furthermore, the merger was met with so much resistance from residents and politicians of Montreal's predominantly English-speaking West Island that by 2005 fifteen municipalities had demerged from the city centre. After it had reached 1.8 million people, the population of Montreal was reduced to 1.6 million residents.

Bourque's strong emphasis on environmental issues was sometimes dismissed as trivial. He was soon known as Géranium I^{er} (Geranium the First) to the public. During a May 12, 2006 interview with then journalist Bernard Drainville though, Bourque claimed that he was not offended by the nickname, pointing at the fact that there is nothing shameful about "being a gardener."

== Opposition ==
In 2001, Vision Montreal was voted out of office. Although 64% of the residents of pre-merger Montreal voted for Bourque and his team, elsewhere, Vision Montreal met a very strong, well-disciplined and united opposition. Gérald Tremblay, who was backed by former members of the Montreal Citizens' Movement (RCM) as well as anti-merger activists, became mayor.

== Bourque’s succession ==
In 2003, Bourque temporarily left his job as Leader of the Opposition, while he tried to become an ADQ Member of the provincial legislature in the district of Bourget. He lost and decided to resume his career at the municipal level. Councillor Ivon Le Duc decided to sit as an Independent, but the majority of the Vision Montreal members wanted Bourque back.

Bourque stayed for three more years but quit city politics in May 2006. Following his resignation, François Purcell (Council member for the district of Saint-Édouard) was selected as the party’s acting leader. Noushig Eloyan (Council member for the district of Bordeaux-Cartierville) became the acting Leader of the Opposition.

A leadership convention was held in June 2009, in which Louise Harel was unanimously chosen as the party leader and candidate for mayor of Montreal for the 2009 municipal elections.

== Support for Marcel Côté ==
Louise Harel chose not to run again for the mayoralty in the November 2013 municipal election. Harel threw the support of Vision Montreal behind a new candidate, Marcel Côté. In September 2013, Côté announced that candidates would be running under the banner Coalition Montréal – Marcel Côté. Coalition Montréal won only six seats in the 2013 election and did not function as the official opposition.

Quebec Chief Electoral Officer Jacques Drouin announced on April 10, 2014 that he had withdrawn party authorization for Vision Montreal as requested by Louise Harel.

== Electoral performance ==
Election	Leader	Votes	%	Seats	+/–	Position	City council
1994	Pierre Bourque	135,678	46.6	39 / 51	▲39	▲1st	Majority
1998	Pierre Bourque	141,814	45.52	39 / 51	0	1st	Majority
2001	Pierre Bourque	279,123	45.14	31 / 73	▼8	▼2nd	Opposition
2005	Pierre Bourque	136,769	36.33	14 / 64	▼17	2nd	Opposition
2009	Louise Harel	137,301	32.73	16 / 64	▲2	2nd	Opposition

== See also ==
- Vision Montreal Crisis, 1997
