= 1998 Montreal municipal election =

Election in Quebec, Canada

- November 1, 1998

51 seats in Montreal City Council 26 seats needed for a majority
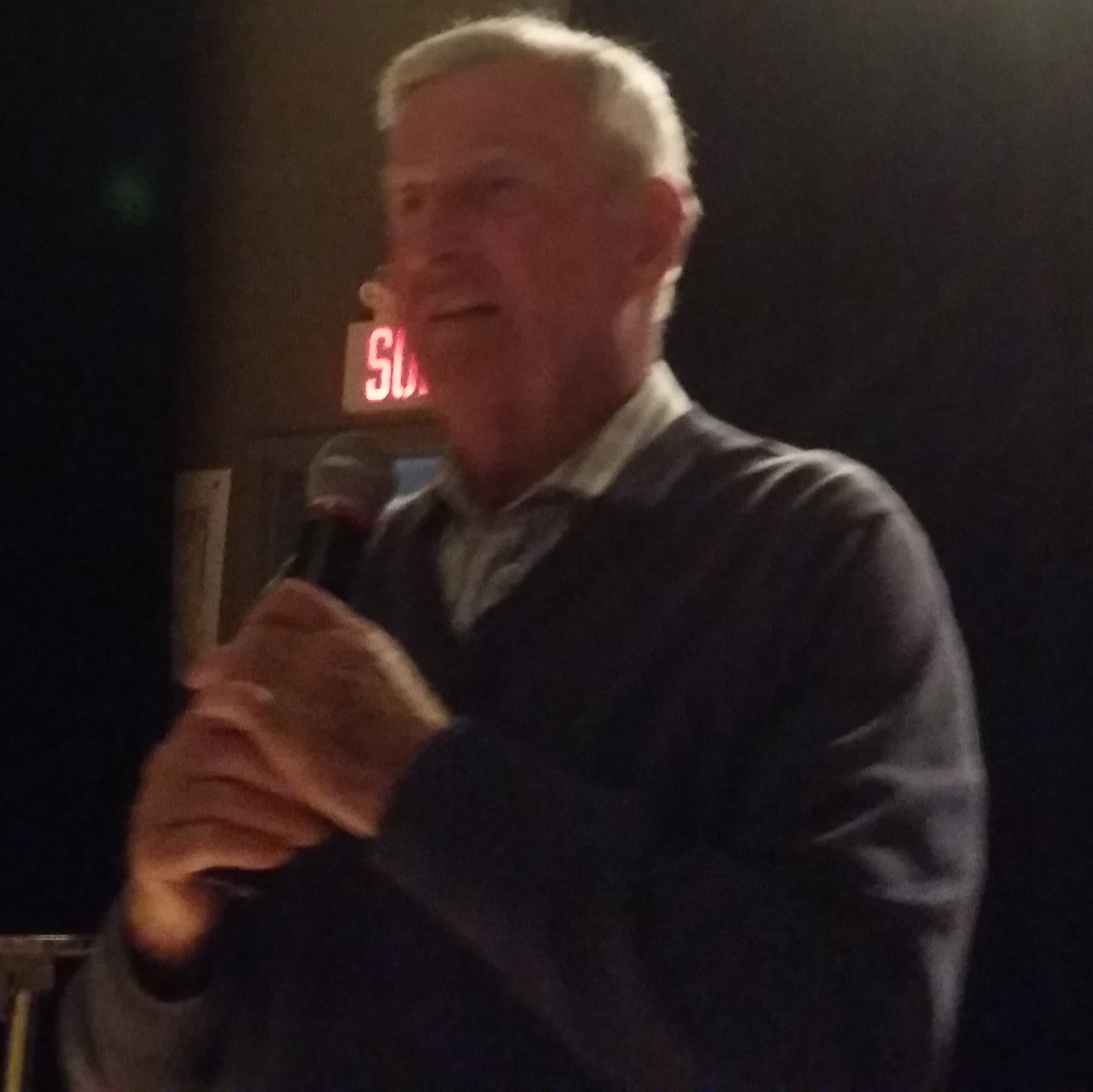

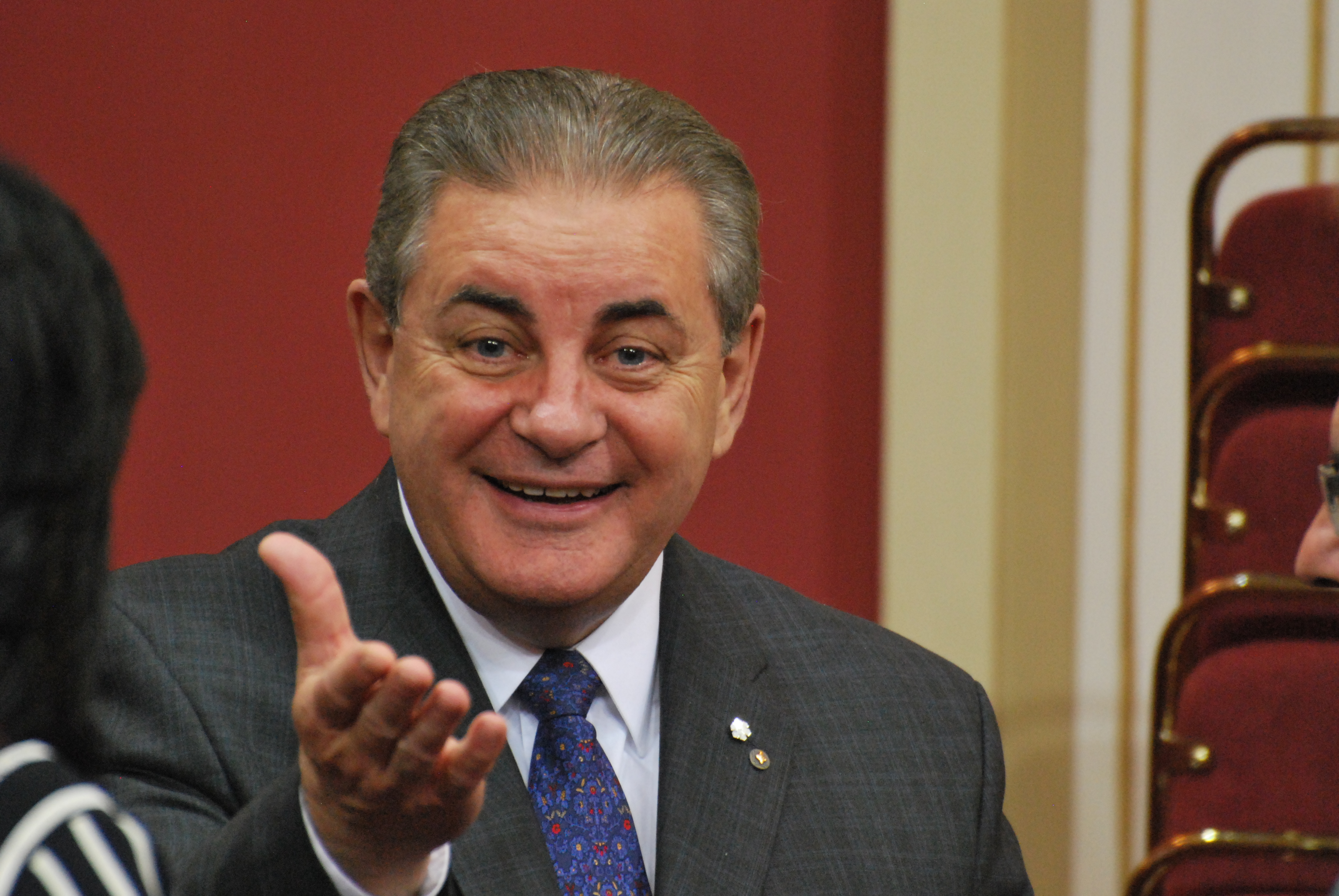

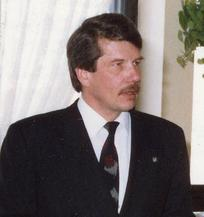
	First party	Second party
Leader	Pierre Bourque	Jacques Duchesneau
Party	Vision Montreal	New Montreal
Leader since	1994	1998
Last election	38 seats, 46.6%	pre-creation
Seats won	39	3
Seat change	▲1	▲3
Popular vote	141,814	84,289
Percentage	44.2%	26.3%
Swing	▼2.4%	pre-creation
	Third party	Fourth party
Leader	Michel Prescott	Jean Doré
Party	Citizens' Movement	Team Montreal
Leader since	1998	1998
Last election	7 seats, 31.5%
Seats won	4	2
Seat change	▼3
Popular vote	46,298	32,167
Percentage	14.4%	10.3%
Swing	▼17.1%
- Results by district
Mayor before election
Pierre Bourque
Vision Montreal
Elected mayor
Pierre Bourque
Vision Montreal

The city of Montreal, Quebec, Canada held municipal elections on November 1, 1998, to elect a mayor and city councillors. Pierre Bourque was returned to a second term as mayor against a divided opposition.

Various suburban communities on the Island of Montreal also held elections on November 1.

== Results ==
=== Mayor ===
1998 Montreal municipal election: Mayor of Montreal
Party	Candidate	Votes	%
Vision Montreal	(x)Pierre Bourque	141,814	45.52
New Montreal	Jacques Duchesneau	84,289	27.05
Montreal Citizens' Movement	Michel Prescott	46,298	14.86
Team Montreal	Jean Doré	32,167	10.32
Montreal 2000	Michel Bédard	3,004	0.96
Independent	Patricia Métivier	2,224	0.71
Independent	Michel Dugré	989	0.32
Independent	Laurent Alie	784	0.25
Total valid votes		311,569	100
Source: Official Results, City of Montreal

=== Council ===
Party colours do not indicate affiliation or resemblance to any federal and provincial party.

PARTY	SEATS IN THE CITY COUNCIL
Vision Montreal	39 / 51
Montreal Citizens' Movement	4 / 51
New Montreal	3 / 51
Team Montreal	2 / 51
Independent	2 / 51
Democratic Coalition	1 / 51

Electoral District	Position	Total valid votes	Candidates						Incumbent
Electoral District	Position	Total valid votes	Montreal Citizens' Movement	Vision Montreal	New Montreal	Team Montreal	Democratic Coalition	Others	Incumbent
#01 Cartierville	City councillor	7,042	Fatima El Amraoui; 631 (8.8%)	Gérard Legault; 2,999 (41.7%)	Pierre Gagnier; 2,681 (37.3%)	Ricardo Zarruk; 673 (9.4%)	Marc Rubin; 58 (1.76%)		Pierre Gagnier
#02 Acadie	City councillor	7,774	Roger Labelle; 611 (7.7%)	Noushig Eloyan; 4,592 (58.0%)	Georges S. Berberi; 2,078 (26.3%)	Pedro Utillano; 304 (3.8%)	Nadia Moussa; 98 (1.2%)	Patrice Leblanc (M2000); 91 (1.1%)	Noushig Eloyan
#03 Ahuntsic	City councillor	7,794	Renée Millette; 754 (9.67%)	Hasmig Belleli; 3,900 (50.04%)	Jimmy V. Capogreco; Co-listed with Jacques Duchesneau; 2,119 (27.19%)	Pierre Veilleux; 793 (10.17%)	Néomie Larocque de Roquebrune; 137 (1.76%)	Yvan Tremblay (M2000); 91 (1.17%)	Hasmig Belleli
#04 Saint-Sulpice	City councillor	6,852	André-Pierre Duchamp; 863 (12.59%)	Maurice Beauchamp; 2,686 (39.20%)	Jean Des Trois Maisons; 2,039 (29.76%)	France Hubert; 1,193 (17.41%)		Frédéric La Brie (M2000); 71 (1.04%)	Maurice Beauchamp
#05 Fleury	City councillor	8,334		Pierre Lapointe; 3,015 (36.18%)	Pierre de Montigny; 2,284 (27.41%)	Martin Blanc; 1,355 (16.26%)	Henry See; 111 (1.33%)	Pierre Lachapelle (Ind.); 1,410 (16.92%); Stéphanie Dubois (M2000); 159 (1.91%)	Colette St-Martin
#06 Sault-au-Récollet	City councillor	7,294	Jean Rémillard; 893 (11.9%)	Serge-Éric Bélanger; 3,125 (41.6%)	Vincenzo Mercadante; 2,300 (30.6%)	Micheline Jourdain; 976 (13.0%)			Serge-Éric Bélanger
#07 Saint-Michel	City councillor	5,701	Valentino Nelson; 417 (7.31%)	Paolo Tamburello; 3,308 (58.02%)	Myrlande Pierre; 856 (15.01%)	Pasquale Compierchio; 1,015 (17.80%)		Marcel Firmin (Ind.); 105 (1.84%)	Paolo Tamburello
#08 Jean-Rivard	City councillor	5,190	Solange Allen; 323 (6.22%)	Nicole Roy-Arcelin; 2,100 (40.46%)	Claude Bricault; 981 (18.90%)	Keder Hyppolite; 505 (9.73%)		Daniel Boucher (Ind.); 1,281 (24.68%)	Daniel Boucher
#09 François-Perrault	City councillor	5,346	Vittorio Capparelli; 1,277 (23.89%)	Frank Venneri; 2,622 (49.05%)	Lanise Hayes; 780 (14.59%)	Yasmin Bautista; 420 (7.86%)		Michel Handfield (Ind.); 247 (4.62%)	Vittorio Capparelli
#10 Villeray	City councillor		Salvatore Rubbo	Sylvain Lachance	Naïma Sebbah	Serge Fleury			Sylvain Lachance
#11 Octave-Crémazie	City councillor		Roger Caron	Anie Samson	Guy Geoffrion	Danielle Lia			Anie Samson
#12 Jarry	City councillor		Tito Alvarado	Achille Polcaro	Ghislaine Charland	Danielle Métras		Etienne Pélissier (M2000)	Achille Polcaro
#13 Parc-Extension	City councillor	7,458	Thanasi Dionisopoulos; 176 (2.36%)	Mary Deros; 2,954 (39.61%)	Effie Gournaki; 1,123 (15.06%)	Christos Karidogiannis; 765 (10.26%)	Sylvia d'Apollonia; 89 (1.19%)	Sofoklis Rasoulis (M2000); 2,124 (28.48%); Naveed Anwar; 227 (3.04%)	Vacant (formerly Konstantinos Georgoulis)
#14 Saint-Édouard	City councillor		Alain Tremblay	François Purcell	Richard Crochetière	Pierre Goyer	Line Goyette	Anna Bagio (Ind.)	Pierre Goyer
#15 Père-Marquette	City councillor		Isabelle Leduc	Jean-François Plante	Robert Laramée	Maxime Bergeron Laurencelle	Normand Gosselin	Elssa Martinez (Ind.)	Robert Laramée
#16 Louis-Hébert	City councillor		Ginette Lajoie	Carl Baillargeon	Louise Doré	Diane Barbeau	André Bouthillier	Uldège Couture (Ind.)	Hubert Deraspe
#17 Étienne-Desmarteau	City councillor		Yves Pellerin	Nicole Thibault	Normand D'Ambrosio	Daniel Michaud		Serge Dubois (M2000)	Michelle Daines
#18 Marie-Victorin	City councillor		Anne Baribeau	Kettly Beauregard; Co-listed with Pierre Bourque	André Meunier	Manon Tanguay		Claude Boismenu (M2000)	Kettly Beauregard
#19 Bourbonnière	City councillor		Bohdan Paska	Denise Larouche	Christian Bolduc	Claude Bégin		Stéphane Thibeault (M2000)	André Lavallée
#20 Vieux-Rosemont	City councillor		Aurèle Bourassa	Marcel Grégoire	Jacques Archambault	Paul Cousineau	Sylvain Lapalme	Mélanie Dubois (M2000)	Robert Côté
#21 Lorimier	City councillor		Richard Théorêt	René Théroux	Gilbert Thibodeau	Danielle Lachance		Janik Litalien (M2000)	Richard Théorêt
#22 Plateau-Mont-Royal	City councillor		André Cardinal	Béranger Lessard	Douglas Buckley-Couvrette	Sylvie Gagnon		Magella Gagné (Ind.); Alain Perrier (M2000); Co-listed with Michel Bédard	Thérèse Daviau
#23 Laurier	City councillor	6,125	Hélène Jolicoeur; 1,846 (30.14%)	Odile Hénault; 1,411 (23.04%)	Louise Roy; 1,454 (23.74%)	Simon Robillard; 1,102 (17.99%)	Jean-Guy Aubé; 107 (1.75%)	Denis Munger (Ind.); 106 (1.73%); Benoît Mainguy (M2000); 99 (1.62%)	Louise Roy
#24 Mile End	City councillor		Maria Teresa Hillar	Ilias Kaperonis	Arminda Mota	Helen Fotopulos		Evripidis Georgiou (Ind.)	Helen Fotopulos
#25 Jeanne-Mance	City councillor		Lucia Kowaluk; Co-listed with Michel Prescott	Tarik Mihoubi	Nelson Santos	Carolle Piché-Burton		Jean-Jacques Gallagher (Ind.)	Michel Prescott
#26 Peter-McGill	City councillor		Shawn Rosengarten	Gerry Weiner	Louise Boyne	Jean Lamarre	Reuven Shultz	René Delbuguet (Ind.); Normand Potvin (M2000)	Georgine Coutu
#27 Côte-des-Neiges	City councillor		Gilles Berger	Pierre-Yves Melançon	Conrad Sauvé	Yolande Cohen		François Dumoulin (M2000)	Pierre-Yves Melançon
#28 Darlington	City councillor		Lilia Esguerra	Jean Fortier	Jack Chadirdjian	Alain Landry	Ronald Finegold		Jack Chadirdjian
#29 Victoria	City councillor		Dan Philip	Saulie Zajdel	Michael Polak	Bracha Udashkin			Saulie Zajdel
#30 Snowdon	City councillor			Patricia Rimok	George Kovac	Gail Campbell	Marvin Rotrand		Marvin Rotrand
#31 Notre-Dame-de-Grâce	City councillor		Deborah Rankin	Rob Bull	Michael Applebaum	David Mowat	Yves Larocque de Roquebrune		Michael Applebaum
#32 Loyola	City councillor			Moshe Shaki	Stephen Laudi	David Oliver	Bruce Toombs	Jeremy Searle (Ind.)	Jeremy Searle
#33 Décarie	City councillor	5,241		Sonya Biddle; 1,737 (33.14%)	Michèle Ciampini; 1,274 (24.31%)	Hubert Simart; 561 (10.70%)	Sam Boskey; 1,669 (31.85%)		Sam Boskey
#34 Émard	City councillor		Benoît Forté	Pierre Paquin	Robert Dobie	Pascal Dussault	Christopher B. Gray	Daniel Tremblay (Ind.)	Robert Gagnon
#35 Saint-Paul	City councillor		Nicole Caron Gagnon	Louis Machabée	Philippe Bissonnette	Caroline Boudreau			Philippe Bissonnette
#36 Saint-Henri	City councillor	4,486		Line Hamel; 1,757 (39.17%)	Germain Prégent; 2,016 (44.94%)	Maria-Ines Osses; 456 (10.16%)	Jo Lechay; 257 (5.73%)		Germain Prégent
#37 Pointe-Saint-Charles	City councillor			Olga Lebron	Claude Rivard	Dominique Ollivier		Marcel Sévigny (Ind.)	Marcel Sévigny
#38 Saint-Jacques	City councillor	6,068	Luc Belhomme; 795 (13.10%)	Diane Cormier; 1,826 (30.09%)	Serge Lareault; 934 (15.39%)	Sammy Forcillo; 2,298 (37.87%)	Robert Saint-Louis; 91 (1.50%)	Alain Deschambault (M2000); 124 (2.04%)	Sammy Forcillo
#39 Sainte-Marie	City councillor		Alain Vaillancourt	Serge Lajeunesse	Francine Boudreault	Martin Lemay	Alain Tremblay	Marie-France Levesque (M2000)	Martin Lemay
#40 Hochelaga	City councillor	4,374	Marc Lamarche; 655 (14.97%)	Luc Larivée; 1,879 (42.96%)	Danielle Brazeau; 1,122 (25.65%)	Jacques Beaudoin; 610 (13.95%)	Clément Bouchard; 108 (2.47%)		Luc Larivée
#41 Maisonneuve	City councillor	4,597	Jacynthe Simard; 719 (15.64%)	Richer Dompierre; 2,179 (47.40%)	Jean Baribeau; 1,047 (22.78%)	Jean Vianney Jutras; 652 (14.18%)			Nathalie Malépart
#42 Pierre-de-Coubertin	City councillor	6,033	Roland Carrier; 991 (16.43%)	Benoît Parent; 2,737 (45.37%)	Harry Etienne; 1,351 (22.39%)	Sylvie Trudel; 954 (15.81%)			Benoît Parent
#43 Louis-Riel	City councillor	7,537	Daniel Thérien; 790 (10.48%)	Jacques Charbonneau; 4,077 (54.09%)	Bernard Lauzon; 1,890 (25.08%)	Nathalie Langlois; 698 (9.26%)		David Bédard (M2000); 82 (1.09%)	Jacques Charbonneau
#44 Longue-Pointe	City councillor	6,119	Nicole Boudreau; 975 (15.93%)	Claire St-Arnaud; 2,446 (39.97%)	Martin Dumont; 2,177 (35.58%)	Jean-Jacques Viger; 521 (8.51%)			Claire St-Arnaud
#45 Honoré-Beaugrand	City councillor	6,583	Patrice Lorrain-Chenu; 943 (14.32%)	Ivon Le Duc; 3,090 (46.94%)	André Pothier; 1,822 (27.68%)	Pierre Lizotte; 728 (11.06%)			Ivon Le Duc
#46 Tétreauville	City councillor	6,602	Danielle Biron; 906 (13.72%)	Jean-Guy Deschamps; 3,605 (54.60%)	Jacques Gendron; 1,511 (22.89%)	Arthur Prince; 580 (8.79%)			Jean-Guy Deschamps
#47 Marc-Aurèle-Fortin	City councillor			Giovanni De Michele	Joe Magri	Jack Thierry Morency		Michel Rainville (M2000)	Giovanni De Michele
#48 Rivière-des-Prairies	City councillor			Aimé Charron	John De Luca	Léopold Ste-Marie		Raymond Dubé (M2000)	Aimé Charron
#49 Pointe-aux-Trembles	City councillor		Ghislaine Boisvert	Marius Minier	Marie Lebeau	Ginette Beaudry		Alexandre Preneveau (Ind.)	Marie Lebeau
#50 La Rousselière	City councillor		Linda Berthelot	Colette Paul	Johanne Chayer	Jacques Savard			Colette Paul
#51 Bout-de-l'Île	City councillor		Pierre Morand	Michel Plante	Ginette Houlé	Réal Lefebvre			Johanne Lorrain

Source: Election results, 1833-2005 (in French), City of Montreal.

== Results in suburban communities (incomplete) ==
=== Dorval ===
Electoral District	Position	Total valid votes	Candidates		Incumbent
Electoral District	Position	Total valid votes	Winner	Second place	Incumbent
	Mayor	4,431	Peter Yeomans; 3,602 (81.29%)	Jan Eisenhardt; 829 (18.71%)	Peter Yeomans
East Ward 1	Councillor	-	Edgar Rouleau (acclaimed)		Edgar Rouleau
East Ward 2	Councillor	-	Emile LaCoste (acclaimed)		Emile LaCoste
East Ward 3	Councillor	-	Raymond Lauzon (acclaimed)		Raymond Lauzon
West Ward 1	Councillor	-	Robert M. Bourbeau (acclaimed)		Robert M. Bourbeau
West Ward 2	Councillor	-	Ian W. Heron (acclaimed)		Ian W. Heron
West Ward 3	Councillor	-	Heather Allard (acclaimed)		Heather Allard

Source: "West Island mayors returned," Montreal Gazette, November 2, 1998, A19.

=== Montreal North ===
Electoral District	Position	Total valid votes	Candidates	Incumbent
Electoral District	Position	Total valid votes	Renouveau municipal	Incumbent
	Mayor	-	Yves Ryan (acclaimed)	Yves Ryan
District 1	Councillor		Antonin Dupont (elected)	Antonin Dupont
District 2	Councillor		Michelle Allaire (elected)	Michelle Allaire
District 3	Councillor		Raymond Paquin (elected)	Raymond Paquin
District 4	Councillor		Georgette Morin (elected)	Georgette Morin
District 5	Councillor		Jean-Marc Gibeau (elected)	Jean-Marc Gibeau
District 6	Councillor		Normand Fortin (elected)	Normand Fortin
District 7	Councillor		René Brabant	
District 8	Councillor		James Infantino (elected)	James Infantino
District 9	Councillor		Robert Guerriero (elected)	Robert Guerriero
District 10	Councillor		Andre Coulombe (elected)	Andre Coulombe

Saint-Leonard

1998 Saint-Leonard municipal election: Councillor, Ward Two
Party	Candidate	Votes	%
Parti Municipal	(x)Mario Battista	accl.	
Source: Irwin Block, "Second acclamation in a row for Zampino," Montreal Gazette, 15 October 1998, A6.

1998 Saint-Leonard municipal election: Councillor, Ward Three
Party	Candidate	Votes	%
Parti Municipal	(x)Italo Barone	accl.	
Source: Irwin Block, "Second acclamation in a row for Zampino," Montreal Gazette, 15 October 1998, A6.

1998 Saint-Leonard municipal election: Councillor, Ward Four
Party	Candidate	Votes	%
Parti Municipal	(x)Domenico Moschella	accl.	
Source: Irwin Block, "Second acclamation in a row for Zampino," Montreal Gazette, 15 October 1998, A6.

1998 Saint-Leonard municipal election: Councillor, Ward Six
Party	Candidate	Votes	%
Parti Municipal	(x)Dominic Perri	accl.	
Source: Irwin Block, "Second acclamation in a row for Zampino," Montreal Gazette, 15 October 1998, A6.

1998 Saint-Leonard municipal election: Councillor, Ward Seven
Party	Candidate	Votes	%
Parti Municipal	(x)Yvette Bissonnet	accl.	
Source: Irwin Block, "Second acclamation in a row for Zampino," Montreal Gazette, 15 October 1998, A6.

1998 Saint-Leonard municipal election: Councillor, Ward Eight
Party	Candidate	Votes	%
Parti Municipal	(x)Vincenzo Arciresi	accl.	
Source: Irwin Block, "Second acclamation in a row for Zampino," Montreal Gazette, 15 October 1998, A6.

1998 Saint-Leonard municipal election: Councillor, Ward Ten
Party	Candidate	Votes	%
Parti municipal	(x)Robert Zambito	accl.	
Source: Irwin Block, "Second acclamation in a row for Zampino," Montreal Gazette, 15 October 1998, A6.
