= 2001 Montreal municipal election =

Election in Quebec, Canada

- November 4, 2001

74 seats in Montreal City Council 38 seats needed for a majority
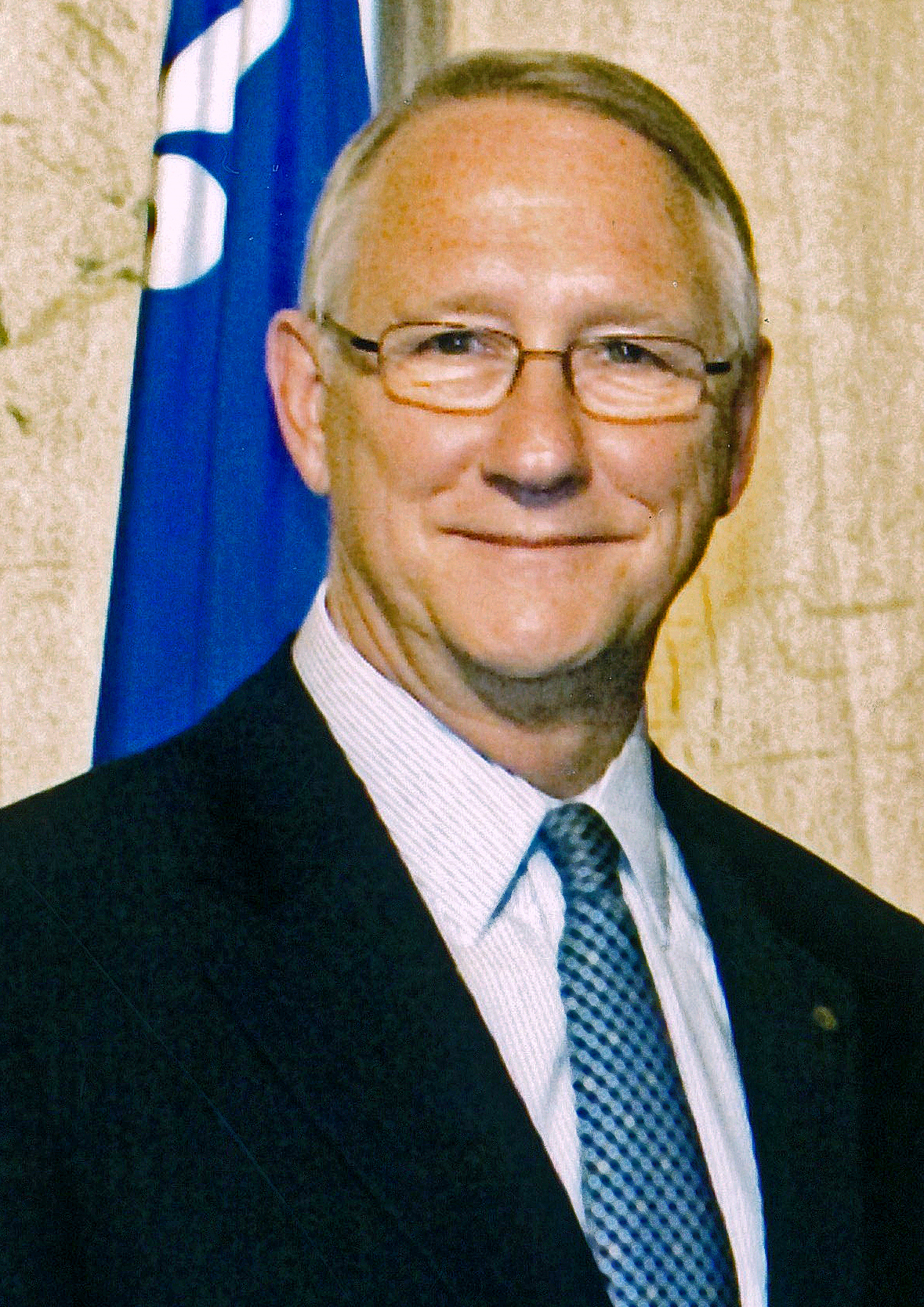

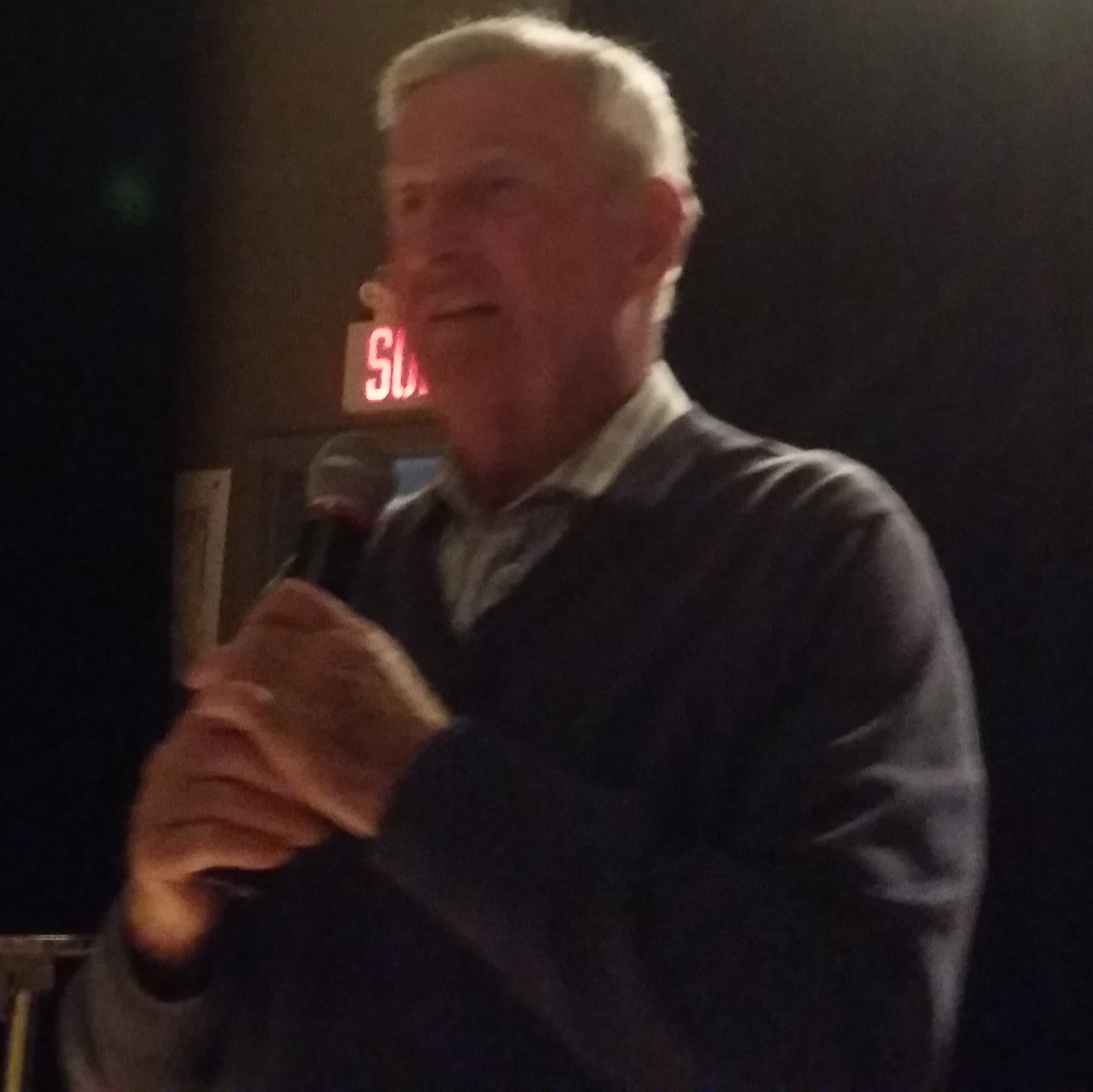
	First party	Second party
Leader	Gérald Tremblay	Pierre Bourque
Party	Citizens Union	Vision Montreal
Leader since	2001	1994
Leader's seat	Mayor	Marie-Victorin
Last election	pre-creation	39 seats, 45.52%
Seats won	40	31
Seat change		▼8
Popular vote	311,451	279,123
Percentage	50.37%	45.14%
Swing	New	▼0.38%
Mayor before election
Pierre Bourque
Vision Montreal
Elected mayor
Gérald Tremblay
Citizens Union

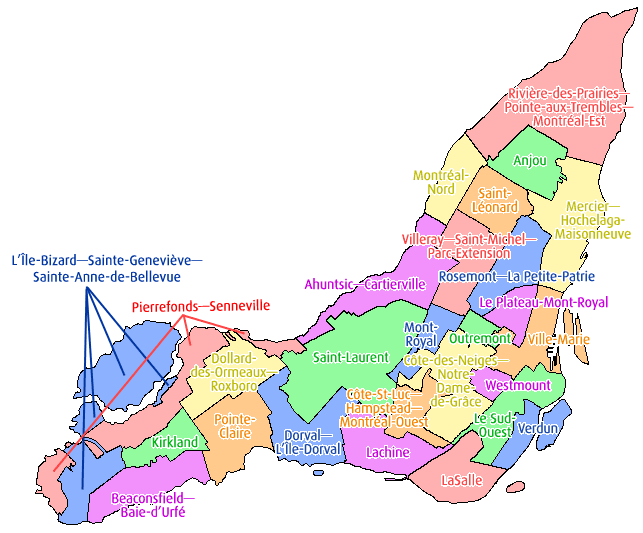
Boroughs of the merged city

Results for city councillor

Results for borough councillor

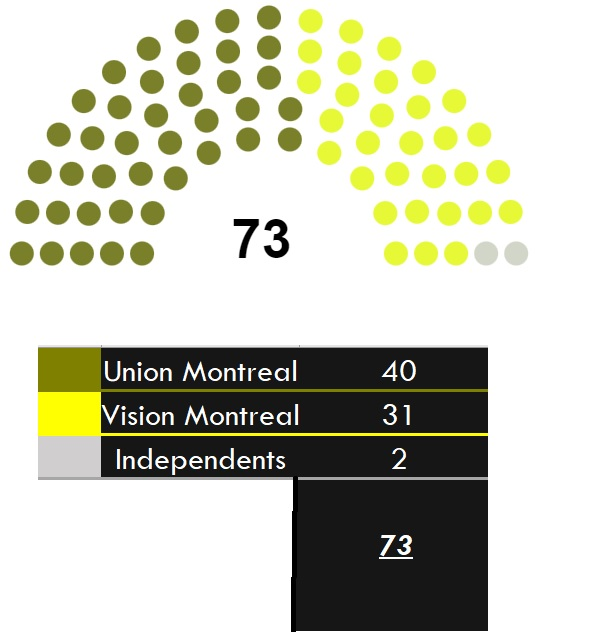
Montreal City Council after the 2001 Municipal Elections.

The 2001 Montreal municipal election took place on November 4, 2001, to elect a mayor and city councillors in Montreal, Quebec, Canada. Gérald Tremblay defeated incumbent Pierre Bourque to become mayor of the newly amalgamated city. This was the only municipal election that was held for the amalgamated city (the amalgamation took effect on January 1, 2002), as the next municipal election was for the defused city.

All mayoral candidates were also allowed to run for a seat on council, with "alternates" who would assume the council seat if the mayoral candidates were elected to both offices.

== Results ==
=== Mayor ===
2001 Montreal municipal election: Mayor of Montreal
Party	Candidate	Votes	%
Montreal Island Citizens Union	Gérald Tremblay	311,451	50.37
Vision Montreal	(x)Pierre Bourque	279,123	45.14
White Elephant Party	Michel Bédard	9,785	1.58
Independent	Super Cauchon	8,382	1.36
Independent	Pierre Larouche	1,991	0.32
Independent	Patricia Métivier	1,809	0.29
Independent	Daniel Cormier	1,434	0.23
Independent	Ricardo Hrtschan	1,290	0.21
Independent	Al Cappe	943	0.15
Independent	Daniel Simon	909	0.15
Independent	Ian Fitchtenbaum	811	0.13
Independent	Samoila Pirau	366	0.06
Total valid votes		618,294	100
Source: Election results, 1833-2005 (in French), City of Montreal.

=== Council (incomplete) ===
2001 Montreal municipal election: Councillor, Acadie
Party	Candidate	Votes	%
Vision Montreal	(x)Hasmig Belleli	5,493	59.51
Montreal Island Citizens Union	James Kromida	3,737	40.49
Total valid votes		9,230	100
Source: Election results, 1833-2005 (in French), City of Montreal.

2001 Montreal municipal election: Councillor, Ahuntsic
Party	Candidate	Votes	%
Vision Montreal	(x)Pierre Lapointe	6,673	65.17
Montreal Island Citizens Union	Pierre Lachapelle	3,566	34.83
Total valid votes		10,239	100
Source: Election results, 1833-2005 (in French), City of Montreal.

2001 Montreal municipal election
Party	Candidate	Votes	%
Vision Montreal	Frank Venneri (incumbent)	4,548	58.04
Montreal Island Citizens Union	Daniel Boucher	2,968	37.88
White Elephant Party	Charles Paradis	320	4.08
Total valid votes		7,836	100
Source: Election results, 1833-2005 (in French), City of Montreal.

2001 Montreal municipal election
Party	Candidate	Votes	%
Vision Montreal	Christine Poulin	4,636	57.45
Montreal Island Citizens Union	Richard Théorêt (incumbent)	2,945	36.50
White Elephant Party	Benoit Mainguy	488	6.05
Total valid votes		8,069	100
Source: Election results, 1833-2005 (in French), City of Montreal.

2001 Montreal municipal election
Party	Candidate	Votes	%
Vision Montreal	Line Hamel	4,773	66.97
Montreal Island Citizens Union	Robert Blondin	2,098	29.44
White Elephant Party	Daniel Paré	256	3.59
Total valid votes		7,127	100
Source: Election results, 1833-2005 (in French), City of Montreal.

2001 Montreal municipal election: Councillor, Parc-Extension
Party	Candidate	Votes	%
Vision Montreal	Mary Deros (incumbent)	3,819	48.67
Montreal Island Citizens Union	George Vathilakis	2,617	33.35
Independent	Sofoklis Rasoulis	1,410	17.97
Total valid votes		7,846	100
Source: Election results, 1833-2005 (in French), City of Montreal.

2001 Montreal municipal election
Party	Candidate	Votes	%
Vision Montreal	Nicolas Tétrault	5,248	61.66
Montreal Island Citizens Union	André Cardinal (incumbent)	2,510	29.49
White Elephant Party	Josée Fournier	510	5.99
Independent	Ann Farrell	150	1.76
Independent	Man Yee Cheung	93	1.09
Total valid votes		8,511	100
Source: Election results, 1833-2005 (in French), City of Montreal.

2001 Montreal municipal election: Councillor, Point-Saint-Charles
Party	Candidate	Votes	%
Vision Montreal	Jacqueline Montpetit	2,995	50.16
Montreal Island Citizens Union	René Labrosse	1,490	24.95
Independent	Richard Wafer	1,365	22.86
Independent	Lionel Petit	121	2.03
Total valid votes		5,971	100
Source: Election results, 1833-2005 (in French), City of Montreal.

2001 Montreal municipal election
Party	Candidate	Votes	%
Montreal Island Citizens Union	Frank Zampino	20,279	26.29
Montreal Island Citizens Union	Yvette Bissonnet	18,438	23.90
Montreal Island Citizens Union	Dominic Perri	16,818	21.80
Vision Montreal	Vincenzo Arciresi	7,555	9.79
Vision Montreal	Basilio Giordano	6,417	8.32
Vision Montreal	Louise Blackburn	6,190	8.02
White Elephant Party	Denis Fournier	896	1.16
Independent	Dolly N. Makambo	557	0.72
Total valid votes		77,150	100
Source: Election results, 1833-2005 (in French), City of Montreal.

2001 Montreal municipal election: Councillor, Saint-Michel
Party	Candidate	Votes	%
Vision Montreal	Paolo Tamburello (incumbent)	5,911	65.24
Montreal Island Citizens Union	Nancy Forlini	2,684	29.62
White Elephant Party	Thérèse Beaulieu	466	5.14
Total valid votes		9,061	100
Source: Election results, 1833-2005 (in French), City of Montreal.

2001 Montreal municipal election: Councillor, Saint-Sulpice
Party	Candidate	Votes	%
Vision Montreal	(x)Maurice Beauchamp	6,064	67.56
Montreal Island Citizens Union	Salvatore Rubbo	2,912	32.44
Total valid votes		8,976	100
Source: Election results, 1833-2005 (in French), City of Montreal.

=== Borough councils (incomplete) ===
2001 Montreal municipal election
Party	Candidate	Votes	%
Montreal Island Citizens Union	Robert Zambito	10,034	73.03
Vision Montreal	Lino Colapelle	3,705	26.97
Total valid votes		13,739	100
Source: Election results, 1833-2005 (in French), City of Montreal.

2001 Montreal municipal election: Saint-Leonard borough Councillor, Port-Maurice division
Party	Candidate	Votes	%
Montreal Island Citizens Union	Mario Battista	7,694	57.78
Vision Montreal	Italo Barone	3,274	24.59
Independent	Steve Gentile	2,347	17.63
Total valid votes		13,315	100
Source: Election results, 1833-2005 (in French), City of Montreal.

=== Composition of city and borough councils ===
Depending on their borough, Montrealers voted for:

- Mayor of Montreal
- One, two, or three city councillors for the whole borough or one for each district, who are also borough councillors
- Zero or one additional borough councillors for the whole borough or for each district

Borough	District	Borough Councillors			
Borough	District	City Councillors			Borough Councillor
Borough	District	City Councillor	City Councillor	City Councillor	Borough Councillor
Ahuntsic-Cartierville	L'Acadie	Hasmig Belleli			
Ahuntsic-Cartierville	Ahuntsic	Pierre Lapointe			
Ahuntsic-Cartierville	Cartierville	Noushig Eloyan			
Ahuntsic-Cartierville	Saint-Sulpice	Maurice Beauchamp			
Ahuntsic-Cartierville	Sault-au-Récollet	Achille Polcaro			
Anjou	—	Luis Miranda	Carol Beaupré		Andrée Hénault
Beaconsfield–Baie-D'Urfé	Beaurepaire	Roy Kemp			Florence Grassby
Beaconsfield–Baie-D'Urfé	James-Morgan	Roy Kemp			Anne-Marie Parent
Côte-des-Neiges– Notre-Dame-de-Grâce	Côte-des-Neiges	Francine Senécal			
Côte-des-Neiges– Notre-Dame-de-Grâce	Darlington	Saulie Zajdel			
Côte-des-Neiges– Notre-Dame-de-Grâce	Décarie	Marcel Tremblay			
Côte-des-Neiges– Notre-Dame-de-Grâce	Loyola	Jeremy Searle			
Côte-des-Neiges– Notre-Dame-de-Grâce	Notre-Dame-de-Grâce	Michael Appelbaum			
Côte-des-Neiges– Notre-Dame-de-Grâce	Snowdon	Marvin Rotrand			
Côte-Saint-Luc– Hampstead–Montreal West	—	Robert Libman	Dida Berku		Anthony Housefather
Dollard-Des Ormeaux– Roxboro	—	Edward Janiszewski	Howard Zingboim		Zoe Bayouk
Dorval–L'Île-Dorval	Désiré-Girouard	Peter B. Yeomans			Egard A. Rouleau
Dorval–L'Île-Dorval	Strathmore	Peter B. Yeomans			Robert M. Bourbeau
L'Île-Bizard– Sainte-Geneviève– Sainte-Anne-de-Bellevue	Anse-à-l'Orme	Jacques Cardinal			Bill Tierney
L'Île-Bizard– Sainte-Geneviève– Sainte-Anne-de-Bellevue	Jacques-Bizard	Jacques Cardinal			Richard Bélanger
Kirkland	Brunswick	John W. Meaney			Brian Macdonald
Kirkland	Côte-Sainte-Marie	John W. Meaney			Michel Gibson
Lachine	—	Claude Dauphin	Jane Cowell-Poitras		Bernard Blanchet
LaSalle	Cecil-P.-Newman	Manon Barbe	Alvaro Farinacci	Richard Deschamps	Michael Vadacchino
LaSalle	Sault-Saint-Louis	Manon Barbe	Alvaro Farinacci	Richard Deschamps	Oksana Kaluzny
Mercier– Hochelaga-Maisonneuve	Hochelaga	Luc Larivée			
Mercier– Hochelaga-Maisonneuve	Longue-Pointe	Claire St-Arnaud			
Mercier– Hochelaga-Maisonneuve	Louis-Riel	Lyn Faust			
Mercier– Hochelaga-Maisonneuve	Maisonneuve	Richer Dompierre			
Mercier– Hochelaga-Maisonneuve	Tétreaultville	Ivon Le Duc			
Montréal-Nord	Marie-Clarac	Marcel Parent	Jean-Marc Gibeau	James V. Infantino	Georgette L. Morin
Montréal-Nord	Ovide-Clermont	Marcel Parent	Jean-Marc Gibeau	James V. Infantino	Normand Fortin
Mount Royal	Frederick-G.-Todd	Suzanne Caron			Cliff Carrie
Mount Royal	Rockland	Suzanne Caron			Nicholas Stephens
Outremont	Jeanne-Sauvé	Stéphane Harbour			Claude B. Piquette
Outremont	Joseph-Beaubien	Stéphane Harbour			Marie Cinq-Mars
Pierrefonds-Senneville	—	Monique Worth	Bertrand A. Ward		René LeBlanc
Le Plateau-Mont-Royal	Jeanne-Mance	Michel Prescott			
Le Plateau-Mont-Royal	Laurier	Christine Poulin			
Le Plateau-Mont-Royal	Mile End	Helen Fotopulos			
Le Plateau-Mont-Royal	Plateau-Mont-Royal	Nicolas Tétrault			
Pointe-Claire	Donegani	Bill McMurchie			Aldo Iermieri
Pointe-Claire	Valois	Bill McMurchie			Morris Trudeau
Rivière-des-Prairies– Pointe-aux-Trembles– Montréal-Est	Bout-de-l'Île	Colette Paul			
Rivière-des-Prairies– Pointe-aux-Trembles– Montréal-Est	Marc-Aurèle-Fortin	Cosmo Maciocia			
Rivière-des-Prairies– Pointe-aux-Trembles– Montréal-Est	Pointe-aux-Trembles	Marius Minier			
Rivière-des-Prairies– Pointe-aux-Trembles– Montréal-Est	Rivière-des-Prairies	Michel Plante			
Rosemont– La Petite-Patrie	Étienne-Desmarteau	Nicole Thibault			
Rosemont– La Petite-Patrie	Louis-Hébert	Jean-François Plante			
Rosemont– La Petite-Patrie	Marie-Victorin	Pierre Bourque			
Rosemont– La Petite-Patrie	Saint-Édouard	François Purcell			
Rosemont– La Petite-Patrie	Vieux-Rosemont	Denise Larouche			
Saint-Laurent	Côte-de-Liesse	Alan DeSousa	René Dussault	Irving Grundman	Maurice Cohen
Saint-Laurent	Normand-McLaren	Alan DeSousa	René Dussault	Irving Grundman	Michèle D. Biron
Saint-Léonard	Grande-Prairie	Frank Zampino	Yvette Bissonnet	Dominic Perri	Robert Zambito
Saint-Léonard	Port-Maurice	Frank Zampino	Yvette Bissonnet	Dominic Perri	Mario Battista
Le Sud-Ouest	Émard	Robert Bousquet			
Le Sud-Ouest	Louis-Cyr	Line Hamel			
Le Sud-Ouest	Pointe-Saint-Charles	Jacqueline Montpetit			
Verdun	Champlain	Georges Bossé	Laurent Dugas	Claude Trudel	Ginette Marotte
Verdun	Desmarchais-Crawford	Georges Bossé	Laurent Dugas	Claude Trudel	John Gallagher
Ville-Marie	Peter-McGill	Louise O'Sullivan			
Ville-Marie	Saint-Jacques	Robert Laramée			
Ville-Marie	Sainte-Marie	Martin Lemay			
Villeray–Saint-Michel– Parc-Extension	Jarry	Anie Samson			
Villeray–Saint-Michel– Parc-Extension	Jean-Rivard	Frank Venneri			
Villeray–Saint-Michel– Parc-Extension	Parc-Extension	Mary Deros			
Villeray–Saint-Michel– Parc-Extension	Saint-Michel	Paolo Tamburello			
Villeray–Saint-Michel– Parc-Extension	Villeray	Sylvain Lachance			
Westmount	Côte-Saint-Antoine	Karin Marks			John de Castell
Westmount	W.-D.-Lighthall	Karin Marks			Cynthia Lulham

== Information about the candidates ==
Montreal Island Citizens Union

- Robert Blondin (Louis-Cyr) appears to have been a first-time candidate. During the 1980s, a person named Robert Blondin chaired the Parti Québécois's riding committee in Saint-Henri and criticized René Lévesque's decision to de-emphasize the party's focus on Quebec sovereignty. This may have been the same person.
- Gilles Marette (Louis-Riel) was a first time candidate.
- Nancy Boileau (Maisonneuve) is a community activist. In 2000, she sought to initiate a class-action lawsuit on behalf of commuters who had waited in cold weather for city buses that never arrived or were too full to pick up more passengers. In the 2001 campaign, she campaigned against gentrification and for more affordable housing.

Vision Montreal

- Lino Colapelle (Saint-Léonard-Est borough council) was a first-time candidate.

White Elephant Party

- Charles Paradis (Jean-Rivard), Daniel Paré (Louis-Cyr) and Denis Fournier (Saint-Léonard) were first-time candidates.

Independents

- Steve Gentile (Port-Maurice) was a first-time candidate. There is a noted designer in Saint-Leonard named Steve Gentile, though it is not known if this is the same person.

== Seat-by-seat results ==
=== Ahuntsic-Cartierville ===
Electoral District	Position	Total valid votes	Candidates			Incumbent
Electoral District	Position	Total valid votes	MICU	Vision Montréal	Independent	Incumbent
Cartierville	City councillor	7,523	Pierre Gagnier; 3,267 (43.43%)	Noushig Eloyan; 4,116 (54.71%)	Ramazan Ozbakir; 140 (1.86%)	Gérard Legault
L'Acadie	City councillor	9,230	James Kromida; 3,737 (40.49%)	Hasmig Belleli; 5,493 (59.51%)		Noushig Eloyan
Ahuntsic	City councillor	10,239	Pierre Lachapelle; 3,566 (34.83%)	Pierre Lapointe; 6,673 (65.17%)		Pierre Lapointe (Fleury)
Ahuntsic	City councillor	10,239	Pierre Lachapelle; 3,566 (34.83%)	Pierre Lapointe; 6,673 (65.17%)		Merged district
Ahuntsic	City councillor	10,239	Pierre Lachapelle; 3,566 (34.83%)	Pierre Lapointe; 6,673 (65.17%)		Hasmig Belleli (Ahuntsic)
Saint-Sulpice	City councillor	8,976	Salvatore Rubbo; 2,912 (32.44%)	Maurice Beauchamp; 6,064 (67.56%)		Maurice Beauchamp
Sault-au-Récollet	City councillor	9,437	Michel Cusano; 3,172 (33.61%)	Achille Polcaro; 4,577 (48.50%)	Jean Rémillard; 1,688 (17.89%)	Serge-Éric Bélanger

=== Anjou ===
Electoral District	Position	Total valid votes	Candidates		Incumbent
Electoral District	Position	Total valid votes	MICU	Vision Montréal	Incumbent
Anjou	City councillor (two members)	33,315	Luis Miranda; 10,686 (32.07%); Carol Beaupré; 9,557 (28.69%)	Benoit Corbeil; 7,016 (21.06%); Michel Simard; 6,056 (18.18%)	New positions
Anjou	Borough councillor	17,537	Andrée Hénault; 10,536 (60.08%)	Ginette Chabot; 7,001 (39.92%)	New position

=== Beaconsfield–Baie-D'Urfé ===
Electoral District	Position	Total valid votes	Candidates			Incumbent
Electoral District	Position	Total valid votes	MICU	Vision Montréal	Independent	Incumbent
Beaconsfield– Baie-D'Urfé	City councillor	10,483	Roy Kemp; 5,878 (56.07%)	Ginette Roy; 530 (5.06%)	Anne Myles; 4,075 (38.87%)	New position
Beaurepaire	Borough councillor	4,594	Florence Grassby; 2,779 (60.49%)	Sue Abidi; 289 (6.29%)	Jon Bazar; 1,526 (33.22%)	New position
James-Morgan	Borough councillor	5,835	Anne-Marie Parent; 3,286 (56.32%)	Salve Desprez; 272 (4.66%)	Beverly Robb; 2,277 (39.02%)	New position

=== Côte-des-Neiges–Notre-Dame-de-Grâce ===
Electoral District	Position	Total valid votes	Candidates			Incumbent
Electoral District	Position	Total valid votes	MICU	Vision Montréal	Other	Incumbent
Côte-des-Neiges	City councillor	7,340	Francine Senécal; Co-candidate for Gérald Tremblay; 3,637 (49.55%)	Pierre-Yves Melançon; 3,483 (47.45%)	François Dumoulin (PÉBM); 220 (3.00%)	Pierre-Yves Melançon
Darlington	City councillor	6,643	Aline Malka; 3,109 (46.80%)	Saulie Zajdel; 3,304 (49.74%)	Koffi Doumon (Ind.); 230 (3.46%)	Saulie Zajdel (Victoria)
Darlington	City councillor	6,643	Aline Malka; 3,109 (46.80%)	Saulie Zajdel; 3,304 (49.74%)	Koffi Doumon (Ind.); 230 (3.46%)	Merged district
Darlington	City councillor	6,643	Aline Malka; 3,109 (46.80%)	Saulie Zajdel; 3,304 (49.74%)	Koffi Doumon (Ind.); 230 (3.46%)	Jean E. Fortier (Darlington)
Décarie	City councillor	6,150	Marcel Tremblay; 3,792 (61.66%)	Sonya Biddle; 2,358 (38.34%)		Sonya Biddle
Loyola	City councillor	6,752	Jeremy Searle; 4,986 (73.84%)	Darryl Gray; 1,766 (26.16%)		Jeremy Searle
Notre-Dame-de-Grâce	City councillor	7,803	Michael Applebaum; 5,257 (67.37%)	Jean E. Fortier; 2,356 (30.19%)	Allan Heafey (PÉBM); 190 (2.44%)	Michael Applebaum
Snowdon	City councillor	7,022	Marvin Rotrand; 4,913 (69.97%)	Bill Surkis; 2,109 (30.03%)		Marvin Rotrand

=== Côte-Saint-Luc–Hampstead–Montreal West ===
Electoral District	Position	Total valid votes	Candidates			Incumbent
Electoral District	Position	Total valid votes	MICU	Vision Montréal	Independent	Incumbent
Côte-Saint-Luc– Hampstead– Montreal West	City councillor (two members)	33,538	Robert Libman; 15,800 (47.11%); Dida Berku; 13,008 (38.79%)	Armand Elbaz; 1,018 (3.03%); Stanley Reinblatt; 845 (2.52%)	Howard Barza; 2,398 (7.15%); Murray Levine; 469 (1.40%)	New positions
Côte-Saint-Luc– Hampstead– Montreal West	Borough councillor	17,501	Anthony Housefather; 12,891 (73.66%)	Harvey Liverman; 1,021 (5.83%)	Ruth Kovac; 3,589 (20.51%)	New position

=== Dollard-Des Ormeaux–Roxboro ===
Electoral District	Position	Total valid votes	Candidates			Incumbent
Electoral District	Position	Total valid votes	MICU	Vision Montréal	Independent	Incumbent
Dollard-Des Ormeaux–Roxboro	City councillor (two members)	38,944	Edward Janiszewski; 15,727 (40.38%); Howard Zingboim; 11,950 (30.69%)	Anis A. Nazar; 2,502 (6.42%); Harold Chorney; 2,397 (6.15%)	Errol Johnson; 4,500 (11.56%); William Spears; 1,868 (4.80%)	New positions
Dollard-Des Ormeaux–Roxboro	Borough councillor	20,304	Zoe Bayouk; 14,929 (73.53%)	Maggie Sarkissian; 2,773 (13.66%)	Maurice Seguin; 2,208 (10.87%); Eduard Hoyer; 394 (1.94%)	New position

=== Dorval–L'Île-Dorval ===
Electoral District	Position	Total valid votes	Candidates		Incumbent
Electoral District	Position	Total valid votes	MICU	Vision Montréal	Incumbent
Dorval–L'Île-Dorval	City councillor	8,031	Peter B. Yeomans; 7,440 (92.64%)	Len MacDonald; 591 (7.36%)	New position
Strathmore	Borough councillor	4,311	Robert M. Bourbeau; 3,929 (91.14%)	François Guidi; 382 (8.86%)	New position
Désiré-Girouard	Borough councillor	3,653	Edgar A. Rouleau; 3,228 (88.37%)	Mario Mammone; 425 (11.63%)	New position

=== L'Île-Bizard–Sainte-Geneviève–Sainte-Anne-de-Bellevue ===
Electoral District	Position	Total valid votes	Candidates			Incumbent
Electoral District	Position	Total valid votes	MICU	Vision Montréal	Independent	Incumbent
L'Île-Bizard–Sainte-Geneviève–Sainte-Anne-de-Bellevue	City councillor	9,394	Jacques Cardinal; 4,156 (44.24%)	René Lecavalier; 2,315 (24.64%)	Normand Marinacci; 2,923 (31.12%)	New position
Anse-à-l'Orme	Borough councillor	3,204	Bill Tierney; 2,487 (77.62%)	Jean-Claude Provost; 717 (22.38%)		New position
Jacques-Bizard	Borough councillor	6,138	Richard Bélanger; 2,929 (47.72%)	Jean-Claude Lebel; 1,221 (19.89%)	Christian Larocque; 1,988 (32.39%)	New position

=== Kirkland ===
Electoral District	Position	Total valid votes	Candidates			Incumbent
Electoral District	Position	Total valid votes	MICU	Vision Montréal	Independent	Incumbent
Kirkland	City councillor	9,165	John W. Meaney; 7,892 (86.11%)	Marino Discepola; 895 (9.77%)	Alex Smith; 378 (4.12%)	New position
Brunswick	Borough councillor	4,749	Brian Macdonald; 2,831 (59.61%)	John L. Ferko; 329 (6.93%)	Joe Sanalitro; 1,589 (33.46%)	New position
Côte-Sainte-Marie	Borough councillor	4,414	Michel Gibson; 3,960 (89.71%)	Anne-Marie Zincoski; 454 (10.29%)		New position

=== Lachine ===
Electoral District	Position	Total valid votes	Candidates			Incumbent
Electoral District	Position	Total valid votes	MICU	Vision Montréal	Other	Incumbent
Lachine	City councillor (two members)	27,900	Claude Dauphin; 9,434 (33.81%); Jane Cowell-Poitras; 7,776 (27.87%)	Guy Dicaire; 4,489 (16.09%); John Vincent Hachey; 3,485 (12.49%)	Raymond Bergervin (Ind.); 2,100 (7.53%); Bernard Tisseur (PÉBM); 616 (2.21%)	New positions
Lachine	Borough councillor	14,811	Bernard Blanchet; 7,386 (49.87%)	Richard Richardson; 4,169 (28.15%)	Georgina Saba (Ind.); 3,256 (21.98%)	New position

=== LaSalle ===
Electoral District	Position	Total valid votes	Candidates			Incumbent
Electoral District	Position	Total valid votes	MICU	Vision Montréal	Independent	Incumbent
LaSalle	City councillor (three members)	70,872	Manon Barbe; 13,131 (18.53%); Alvaro Farinacci; 12,730 (17.96%); Richard Deschamps; 11,260 (15.89%)	Robert Cordner; 9,174 (12.94%); Monique Vallée; 7,746 (10.93%); François Dupuis; 7,599 (10.72%)	Frank Talarico; 6,082 (8.58%); Antonio C. Massana; 3,150 (4.45%)	New positions
Cecil-P.-Newman	Borough councillor	11,184	Michael Vadacchino; 6,693 (59.84%)	Pina Mancuso; 4,491 (40.16%)		New position
Sault-Saint-Louis	Borough councillor	13,976	Oksana Kaluzny; 7,917 (56.65%)	Frank Carnuccio; 6,059 (43.35%)		New position

=== Mercier–Hochelaga-Maisonneuve ===
Electoral District	Position	Total valid votes	Candidates			Incumbent
Electoral District	Position	Total valid votes	MICU	Vision Montréal	White Elephant Party	Incumbent
Hochelaga	City councillor	6,636	Jean-François Moisan; 1,760 (26.52%)	Luc Larivée; 4,418 (66.58%)	Danielle Giasson; 458 (6.90%)	Luc Larivée
Maisonneuve	City councillor	7,993	Nancy Boileau; 2,248 (28.12%)	Richer Dompierre; 5,745 (71.88%)		Richer Dompierre (Maisonneuve)
Maisonneuve	City councillor	7,993	Nancy Boileau; 2,248 (28.12%)	Richer Dompierre; 5,745 (71.88%)		Merged district
Maisonneuve	City councillor	7,993	Nancy Boileau; 2,248 (28.12%)	Richer Dompierre; 5,745 (71.88%)		Benoît Parent (Pierre-de-Coubertin)
Louis-Riel	City councillor	9,223	Gilles Marette; 2,836 (30.75%)	Lyn Faust; 6,387 (69.25%)		Jacques Charbonneau
Longue-Pointe	City councillor	9,241	Martin Dumont; 3,767 (40.76%)	Claire St-Arnaud; 5,474 (59.24%)		Claire St-Arnaud
Tétreaultville	City councillor	10,082	Francisca Marques; 2,968 (29.44%)	Ivon Le Duc; 7,114 (70.56%)		Ivon Le Duc (Honoré-Beaugrand)
Tétreaultville	City councillor	10,082	Francisca Marques; 2,968 (29.44%)	Ivon Le Duc; 7,114 (70.56%)		Merged district
Tétreaultville	City councillor	10,082	Francisca Marques; 2,968 (29.44%)	Ivon Le Duc; 7,114 (70.56%)		Jean-Guy Deschamps (Tétreaultville)

=== Montréal-Nord ===
Electoral District	Position	Total valid votes	Candidates			Incumbent
Electoral District	Position	Total valid votes	MICU	Vision Montréal	Independent	Incumbent
Montréal-Nord	City councillor (three members)	68,695	Marcel Parent; 12,884 (18.76%); Jean-Marc Gibeau; 12,097 (17.61%); James Infantino; 11,451 (16.67%)	Michelle Allaire; 11,359 (16.54%); Luigi di Vito; 9,960 (14.50%); Nicole Roy-Arcelin; 9,590 (13.96%)	Jean-Claude Mvilongo; 1,354 (1.97%)	New positions
Marie-Clarac	Borough councillor	12,560	Georgette L. Morin; 6,199 (49.35%)	Antonin Dupont; 5,595 (44.55%)	Henri-Paul Bernier; 766 (6.10%)	New position
Ovide-Clermont	Borough councillor	11,577	Normand Fortin; 7,222 (62.38%)	Fritzberg Daleus; 4,355 (37.62%)		New position

=== Mount Royal ===
Electoral District	Position	Total valid votes	Candidates		Incumbent
Electoral District	Position	Total valid votes	MICU	Vision Montréal	Incumbent
Mount Royal	City councillor	8,153	Suzanne Caron; 6,410 (78.62%)	Jacques O'Keefe; 1,743 (21.38%)	New position
Frederick-G.-Todd	Borough councillor	4,147	Cliff Carrie; 3,078 (74.22%)	Nicole Pichette; 1,069 (25.78%)	New position
Rockland	Borough councillor	4,032	Nicholas Stephens; 3,200 (79.37%)	Jacques Bassal; 832 (20.63%)	New position

=== Outremont ===
Electoral District	Position	Total valid votes	Candidates			Incumbent
Electoral District	Position	Total valid votes	MICU	Vision Montréal	Independent	Incumbent
Outremont	City councillor	8,739	Stéphane Harbour; 5,436 (62.20%)	Pierre Delorme; 3,303 (37.80%)		New position
Jeanne-Sauvé	Borough councillor	4,525	Claude B. Piquette; 1,634 (36.11%)	Jean-Sébastien Marineau; 1,299 (28.71%)	Céline Forget; 1,592 (35.18%)	New position
Joseph-Beaubien	Borough councillor	4,281	Marie Cinq-Mars; 2,903 (67.81%)	Paul-André Tétreault; 1,378 (32.19%)		New position

=== Pierrefonds-Senneville ===
Electoral District	Position	Total valid votes	Candidates			Incumbent
Electoral District	Position	Total valid votes	MICU	Vision Montréal	Independent	Incumbent
Pierrefonds-Senneville	City councillor (two members)	34,255	Monique Worth; 12,765 (37.27%); Bertrand A. Ward; 12,144 (35.45%)	Catherine Clément-Talbot; 4,019 (11.73%); Michael Labelle; 3,922 (11.45%)	Lucien Pigeon; 1,405 (4.10%)	New positions
Pierrefonds-Senneville	Borough councillor	18,026	René E. LeBlanc; 13,766 (76.37%)	Pierre Geoffrion; 4,260 (23.63%)		New position

=== Le Plateau-Mont-Royal ===
Electoral District	Position	Total valid votes	Candidates			Incumbent
Electoral District	Position	Total valid votes	MICU	Vision Montréal	Other	Incumbent
Jeanne-Mance	City councillor	5,720	Michel Prescott; 2,928 (51.19%)	Vivian Goulder; 2,430 (42.48%)	Patrick Ross (PÉBM); 197 (3.44%); Maria Da Luz Dos Santos Inacio (Ind.); 165 (2.89%)	Michel Prescott
Laurier	City councillor	8,069	Richard Théorêt; 2,945 (36.50%)	Christine Poulin; 4,636 (57.45%)	Benoit Mainguy (PÉBM); 488 (6.05%)	Hélène Jolicoeur
Mile End	City councillor	7,055	Helen Fotopulos; 3,799 (53.85%)	Salwa Tazi; 2,715 (38.48%)	Evripidis Georgiou (Ind.); 276 (3.91%); Michel Parent (PÉBM); 265 (3.76%)	Helen Fotopulos
Plateau-Mont-Royal	City councillor	8,511	André Cardinal; 2,510 (29.49%)	Nicolas Tétrault; 5,248 (61.66%)	Josée Fournier (PÉBM); 510 (5.99%); Ann Farrell (Ind.); 150 (1.76%); Man Yee Cheung (Ind.); 93 (1.09%)	André Cardinal (Plateau-Mont-Royal)
Plateau-Mont-Royal	City councillor	8,511	André Cardinal; 2,510 (29.49%)	Nicolas Tétrault; 5,248 (61.66%)	Josée Fournier (PÉBM); 510 (5.99%); Ann Farrell (Ind.); 150 (1.76%); Man Yee Cheung (Ind.); 93 (1.09%)	Merged district
Plateau-Mont-Royal	City councillor	8,511	André Cardinal; 2,510 (29.49%)	Nicolas Tétrault; 5,248 (61.66%)	Josée Fournier (PÉBM); 510 (5.99%); Ann Farrell (Ind.); 150 (1.76%); Man Yee Cheung (Ind.); 93 (1.09%)	Richard Théorêt (Lorimier)

=== Pointe-Claire ===
Electoral District	Position	Total valid votes	Candidates		Incumbent
Electoral District	Position	Total valid votes	MICU	Vision Montréal	Incumbent
Pointe-Claire	City councillor	13,210	Bill McMurchie; 12,280 (92.96%)	Terry J. Corcoran; 930 (7.04%)	New position
Donegani	Borough councillor	6,658	Aldo Iermieri; 6,106 (91.71%)	Reggie Massey; 552 (8.29%)	New position
Valois	Borough councillor	6,505	Morris Trudeau; 5,968 (91.74%)	Gerry Sztuka; 537 (8.26%)	New position

=== Rivière-des-Prairies–Pointe-aux-Trembles–Montréal-Est ===
Electoral District	Position	Total valid votes	Candidates			Incumbent
Electoral District	Position	Total valid votes	MICU	Vision Montréal	Other	Incumbent
Bout-de-l'Île	City councillor	10,276	Jean-Marie Verret; 3,666 (35.68%)	Colette Paul; 6,610 (64.32%)		Colette Paul (La Rousselière)
Bout-de-l'Île	City councillor	10,276	Jean-Marie Verret; 3,666 (35.68%)	Colette Paul; 6,610 (64.32%)		Merged district
Bout-de-l'Île	City councillor	10,276	Jean-Marie Verret; 3,666 (35.68%)	Colette Paul; 6,610 (64.32%)		Michel Plante (Bout-de-l'Île)
Marc-Aurèle-Fortin	City councillor	10,229	Cosmo Maciocia; 5,146 (50.31%)	Giovanni De Michele; 4,823 (47.15%)	Françoise Desrochers (PÉBM); 260 (2.54%)	Giovanni De Michele
Pointe-aux-Trembles	City councillor	10,819	Yvon Labrosse; 3,455 (31.93%)	Marius Minier; 5,146 (47.56%)	Roger Lachapelle (Ind.); 1,299 (12.01%); André Dutremble (Ind.); 755 (6.98%); Daniel Proulx (PÉBM); 164 (1.52%)	Marius Minier (Pointe-aux-Trembles)
Pointe-aux-Trembles	City councillor	10,819	Yvon Labrosse; 3,455 (31.93%)	Marius Minier; 5,146 (47.56%)	Roger Lachapelle (Ind.); 1,299 (12.01%); André Dutremble (Ind.); 755 (6.98%); Daniel Proulx (PÉBM); 164 (1.52%)	Merged district
Pointe-aux-Trembles	City councillor	10,819	Yvon Labrosse; 3,455 (31.93%)	Marius Minier; 5,146 (47.56%)	Roger Lachapelle (Ind.); 1,299 (12.01%); André Dutremble (Ind.); 755 (6.98%); Daniel Proulx (PÉBM); 164 (1.52%)	Yvon Labrosse (Mayor of Montreal East)
Rivière-des-Prairies	City councillor	8,507	Georges Roman; 2,935 (34.50%)	Michel Plante; 5,210 (61.24%)	Valérie Deluca (PÉBM); 362 (4.26%)	Aimé Charron

=== Rosemont–La Petite-Patrie ===
Electoral District	Position	Total valid votes	Candidates			Incumbent
Electoral District	Position	Total valid votes	MICU	Vision Montréal	White Elephant Party	Incumbent
Étienne-Desmarteau	City councillor	8,095	Lilia Paquin; 2,656 (32.81%)	Nicole Thibault; 5,050 (62.38%)	Francine Hébert; 389 (4.81%)	Nicole Thibault
Louis-Hébert	City councillor	9,378	Sylvie Gagnon; 3,156 (33.65%)	Jean-François Plante; 6,222 (66.35%)		Carl Baillargeon
Marie-Victorin	City councillor	11,013	Hugo Morissette; 3,587 (32.57%)	Kettly Beauregard; Co-candidate for Pierre Bourque; 7,077 (64.26%)	Gilles Bédard; 349 (3.17%)	Kettly Beauregard
Saint-Édouard	City councillor	7,584	Dolores Correa-Appleyard; 1,955 (25.78%)	François Purcell; 5,023 (66.23%)	David Bédard; 606 (7.99%)	François Purcell (Saint-Édouard)
Saint-Édouard	City councillor	7,584	Dolores Correa-Appleyard; 1,955 (25.78%)	François Purcell; 5,023 (66.23%)	David Bédard; 606 (7.99%)	Merged district
Saint-Édouard	City councillor	7,584	Dolores Correa-Appleyard; 1,955 (25.78%)	François Purcell; 5,023 (66.23%)	David Bédard; 606 (7.99%)	Jean-François Plante (Père-Marquette)
Vieux-Rosemont	City councillor	8,954	Richard Lemay; 2,426 (27.09%)	Denise Larouche; 6,100 (68.13%)	Claude Laveaux; 428 (4.78%)	Denise Larouche (Bourbonnière)
Vieux-Rosemont	City councillor	8,954	Richard Lemay; 2,426 (27.09%)	Denise Larouche; 6,100 (68.13%)	Claude Laveaux; 428 (4.78%)	Merged district
Vieux-Rosemont	City councillor	8,954	Richard Lemay; 2,426 (27.09%)	Denise Larouche; 6,100 (68.13%)	Claude Laveaux; 428 (4.78%)	Marcel Grégoire (Vieux-Rosemont)

=== Saint-Laurent ===
Electoral District	Position	Total valid votes	Candidates			Incumbent
Electoral District	Position	Total valid votes	MICU	Vision Montréal	Independent	Incumbent
Saint-Laurent	City councillor (three members)	73,238	Alan DeSousa; 18,078 (24.68%); René Dussault; 17,490 (23.88%); Irving Grundman; 16,717 (22.83%)	Pierre Lambert; 7,695 (10.51%); François Ghali; 7,221 (9.86%); Danae Savides; 6,037 (8.24%)		New positions
Côte-de-Liesse	Borough councillor	12,441	Maurice Cohen; 9,906 (79.62%)	Irina Tsarevsky; 2,535 (20.38%)		New position
Normand-McLaren	Borough councillor	13,295	Michèle D. Biron; 7,770 (58.44%)	Yvette Biondi; 3,935 (29.60%)	Rafik F. Hakim; 1,054 (7.93%); Martin Benoit; 536 (4.03%)	New position

=== Saint-Léonard ===
Electoral District	Position	Total valid votes	Candidates			Incumbent
Electoral District	Position	Total valid votes	MICU	Vision Montréal	Other	Incumbent
Saint-Léonard	City councillor (three members)	77,150	Frank Zampino; 20,279 (26.29%); Yvette Bissonnet; 18,438 (23.90%); Dominic Perri; 16,818 (21.80%)	Vincenzo Arciresi; 7,555 (9.79%); Basilio Giordano; 6,417 (8.32%); Louise Blackburn; 6,190 (8.02%)	Denis Fournier (PÉBM); 896 (1.16%); Dolly N. Makambo (Ind.); 557 (0.72%)	New positions
Grande-Prairie	Borough councillor	13,739	Robert L. Zambito; 10,034 (73.03%)	Lino Colapelle; 3,705 (26.97%)		New position
Port-Maurice	Borough councillor	13,315	Mario Battista; 7,694 (57.78%)	Italo Barone; 3,274 (24.59%)	Steve Gentile (Ind.); 2,347 (17.63%)	New position

=== Le Sud-Ouest ===
Electoral District	Position	Total valid votes	Candidates			Incumbent
Electoral District	Position	Total valid votes	MICU	Vision Montréal	Other	Incumbent
Émard	City councillor	7,778	Georges Durivage; 2,438 (31.35%)	Robert Bousquet; 3,918 (50.37%)	Daniel Tremblay (Ind.); 1,282 (16.48%); Pamela McLaughlin (Ind.); 140 (1.80%)	Pierre Paquin
Louis-Cyr	City councillor	7,127	Robert Blondin; 2,098 (29.44%)	Line Hamel; 4,773 (66.97%)	Daniel Paré (PÉBM); 256 (3.59%)	Philippe Bissonnette (Saint-Paul)
Louis-Cyr	City councillor	7,127	Robert Blondin; 2,098 (29.44%)	Line Hamel; 4,773 (66.97%)	Daniel Paré (PÉBM); 256 (3.59%)	Merged district
Louis-Cyr	City councillor	7,127	Robert Blondin; 2,098 (29.44%)	Line Hamel; 4,773 (66.97%)	Daniel Paré (PÉBM); 256 (3.59%)	Germain Prégent (Saint-Henri)
Pointe-Saint-Charles	City councillor	5,971	René Labrosse; 1,490 (24.95%)	Jacqueline Montpetit; 2,995 (50.16%)	Richard Wafer (Ind.); 1,365 (22.86%); Lionel Petit (Ind.); 121 (2.03%)	Marcel Sévigny

=== Verdun ===
Electoral District	Position	Total valid votes	Candidates			Incumbent
Electoral District	Position	Total valid votes	MICU	Vision Montréal	Other	Incumbent
Verdun	City councillor (three members)	58,773	Georges Bossé; 11,415 (19.42%); Laurent Dugas; 9,001 (15.31%); Claude Trudel; 8,540 (14.53%)	Danielle Paiement; 7,593 (12.92%); Robert Isabelle; 7,577 (12.89%); Micheline Senécal; 7,377 (12.55%)	Catherine Chauvin (Ind.); 4,843 (8.24%); Pierre Labrosse (Ind.); 1,641 (2.79%); Daniel Racicot (PÉBM); 786 (1.34%)	New positions
Desmarchais-Crawford	Borough councillor	10,804	John Gallagher; 5,553 (51.40%)	André Savard; 5,251 (48.60%)		New position
Champlain	Borough councillor	10,197	Ginette Marotte; 5,026 (49.29%)	Robert Filiatrault; 4,761 (46.69%)	Cook Gosselin (Ind.); 410 (4.02%)	New position

=== Ville-Marie ===
Electoral District	Position	Total valid votes	Candidates			Incumbent
Electoral District	Position	Total valid votes	MICU	Vision Montréal	Other	Incumbent
Peter-McGill	City councillor	6,044	Louise O'Sullivan Boyne; 3,328 (55.06%)	Carolina Golla La Flèche; 2,476 (40.97%)	Van Petteway (Ind.); 91 (1.50%); Normand Potvin (PÉBM); 76 (1.26%); Glenmore Browne (Ind.); 73 (1.21%)	Gerry Weiner
Saint-Jacques	City councillor	7,112	Sammy Forcillo; 3,239 (45.54%)	Robert Laramée; 3,523 (49.54%)	Sylvie Degagné (PÉBM); 275 (3.87%); Maria Grochowska (Ind.); 75 (1.05%)	Sammy Forcillo
Sainte-Marie	City councillor	6,004	Jacques René Beaudoin; 1,327 (22.10%)	Martin Lemay; 4,314 (71.85%)	Sébastien Larivière (PÉBM); 363 (6.05%)	Serge Lajeunesse

=== Villeray–Saint-Michel–Parc-Extension ===
Electoral District	Position	Total valid votes	Candidates			Incumbent
Electoral District	Position	Total valid votes	MICU	Vision Montréal	Other	Incumbent
Jarry	City councillor	8,019	Sébastien Richard; 2,359 (29.42%)	Anie Samson; 4,904 (61.16%)	Richard Lulin (Ind.); 346 (4.31%); Robert Boucher (Ind.); 293 (3.65%); Mostafa Ben Kirane (Ind.); 117 (1.46%); ~~Charles Robidoux (Ind.)~~; Candidacy withdrawn	Anie Samson (Octave-Crémazie)
Jarry	City councillor	8,019	Sébastien Richard; 2,359 (29.42%)	Anie Samson; 4,904 (61.16%)	Richard Lulin (Ind.); 346 (4.31%); Robert Boucher (Ind.); 293 (3.65%); Mostafa Ben Kirane (Ind.); 117 (1.46%); ~~Charles Robidoux (Ind.)~~; Candidacy withdrawn	Merged district
Jarry	City councillor	8,019	Sébastien Richard; 2,359 (29.42%)	Anie Samson; 4,904 (61.16%)	Richard Lulin (Ind.); 346 (4.31%); Robert Boucher (Ind.); 293 (3.65%); Mostafa Ben Kirane (Ind.); 117 (1.46%); ~~Charles Robidoux (Ind.)~~; Candidacy withdrawn	Achille Polcaro (Jarry)
Jean-Rivard	City councillor	7,836	Daniel Boucher; 2,968 (37.88%)	Frank Venneri; 4,548 (58.04%)	Charles Paradis (PÉBM); 320 (4.08%)	Frank Venneri (François-Perrault)
Jean-Rivard	City councillor	7,836	Daniel Boucher; 2,968 (37.88%)	Frank Venneri; 4,548 (58.04%)	Charles Paradis (PÉBM); 320 (4.08%)	Merged district
Jean-Rivard	City councillor	7,836	Daniel Boucher; 2,968 (37.88%)	Frank Venneri; 4,548 (58.04%)	Charles Paradis (PÉBM); 320 (4.08%)	Nicole Roy-Arcelin (Jean-Rivard)
Parc-Extension	City councillor	7,846	George Vathilakis; 2,617 (33.36%)	Mary Deros; 3,819 (48.67%)	Sofoklis Rasoulis (Ind.); 1,410 (17.97%)	Mary Deros
Saint-Michel	City councillor	9,061	Nancy Forlini; 2,684 (29.62%)	Paolo Tamburello; 5,911 (65.24%)	Thérèse Beaulieu (PÉBM); 466 (5.14%)	Paolo Tamburello
Villeray	City councillor	8,325	Kenneth George; 2,532 (30.41%)	Sylvain Lachance; 5,467 (65.67%)	Alain Trottier (PÉBM); 326 (3.92%)	Sylvain Lachance

=== Westmount ===
Electoral District	Position	Total valid votes	Candidates			Incumbent
Electoral District	Position	Total valid votes	Vision Montréal	White Elephant Party	Independent	Incumbent
Westmount	City councillor	8,083	Richard McConomy; 630 (7.79%)	Lucien Parent; 150 (1.86%)	Karin Marks; 7,303 (90.35%)	New position
Côte-Saint-Antoine	Borough councillor	—			John de Castell; Acclaimed	New position
W.-D.-Lighthall	Borough councillor	3,883	Pat Donnelly; 371 (9.55%)		Cynthia Lulham; 3,512 (90.45%)	New position
