= Maurice Beauchamp =

Canadian politician

Maurice Beauchamp is a retired politician in Montreal, Quebec, Canada. He served on the Montreal city council from 1994 to 2005, representing Saint-Sulpice as a member of Vision Montreal.

== Early career ==
Beauchamp is a horticulturalist. He was an employee of the Montreal Botanical Garden for three decades and in this capacity worked closely with its director, Pierre Bourque, who was subsequently the founder of Vision Montreal.

== City councillor ==
Bourque administration

Beauchamp was first elected to Montreal city council in the 1994 municipal election, defeating incumbent Michael Benoit in Saint-Sulpice. Vision Montreal won a council majority in this election under Bourque's leadership, and, when the new council met in November 1994, Bourque appointed Beauchamp to a six-month term as deputy mayor. In February 1997, he appointed Beauchamp as president of the city's administration and services committee.

Vision Montreal won a second consecutive council majority in the 1998 municipal election. Beauchamp, who was re-elected in Saint-Sulpice, was appointed as an associate member of the Montreal executive committee in November 1998. He was also named as municipal ombudsman, a position that Bourque had established in 1994. Beauchamp's 1998 ombudsman's report requested that the office have an independent budget and be formally recognized in Montreal's city charter.

Tremblay administration

Beauchamp was elected to a third term in 2001, as Gérald Tremblay's Montreal Island Citizens Union (MICU) won a majority on council. Beauchamp stood down as ombudsman and served for the next four years as a member of the opposition. By virtue of his position on city council, he also served on the Ahuntsic-Cartierville borough council.

As a member of city's transport committee, Beauchamp called for a smoking ban in city taxis in 2003.

Beauchamp ran for borough mayor of Ahuntsic-Cartierville in the 2005 election and was defeated by MICU candidate Marie-Andrée Beaudoin. A newspaper report from the campaign identified him as seventy-three years old.

== Electoral record ==
2005 Montreal municipal election: Mayor, Borough of Ahuntsic–Cartierville
Party	Candidate	Votes	%
Montreal Island Citizens Union	Marie-Andrée Beaudoin	16,411	49.59
Vision Montreal	Maurice Beauchamp	12,789	38.65
Projet Montréal	Yves Laporte	3,891	11.76
Total valid votes		33,091	100
Source: City of Montreal official results (in French), City of Montreal.

2001 Montreal municipal election: Councillor, Saint-Sulpice
Party	Candidate	Votes	%
Vision Montreal	(x)Maurice Beauchamp	6,064	67.56
Montreal Island Citizens Union	Salvatore Rubbo	2,912	32.44
Total valid votes		8,976	100
Source: Election results, 1833-2005 (in French), City of Montreal.

1998 Montreal municipal election: Councillor, Saint-Sulpice
Party	Candidate	Votes	%
Vision Montreal	(x)Maurice Beauchamp	2,686	39.20
New Montreal	Jean Des Trois Maisons	2,039	29.76
Team Montreal	France Hubert	1,193	17.41
Montreal Citizens' Movement	André-Pierre Duchamp	863	12.59
Montreal 2000	Frédéric La Brie	71	1.04
Total valid votes		6,852	100.00
Source: Official Results, City of Montreal.

1994 Montreal municipal election: Councillor, Saint-Sulpice
Party	Candidate	Votes	%
Vision Montreal	Maurice Beauchamp	2,602	39.26
Independent	(x)Michel Benoit	2,125	32.06
Montreal Citizens' Movement	Daniel Ducharme	1,540	23.23
Montrealers' Party	Karine Hénault	263	3.97
Democratic Coalition–Ecology Montreal	Max de Carrier	98	1.48
Total valid votes		6,628	100
Source: Official results, City of Montreal.
