= Line Hamel =

Montreal City Councillor for Saint-Henri–La Petite-Bourgogne–Pointe-Saint-Charles
- In office 2005–2009
- Preceded by: redistribution
- Succeeded by: Véronique Fournier

Montreal City Councillor for Louis-Cyr
- In office 2001–2005
- Preceded by: division created
- Succeeded by: redistribution

Line Hamel is a politician in Montreal, Quebec, Canada. She served on the Montreal city council from 2001 to 2009.

== Education ==
Hamel has a Bachelor of Arts degree from the Université du Québec à Montréal (UQAM).

== City councillor ==
Hamel first ran for city council in the 1998 municipal election as Vision Montreal's candidate for Saint-Henri. She lost to longtime incumbent Germain Prégent of New Montreal.

Hamel ran again in the 2001 municipal election and was elected for the Louis-Cyr division. She was re-elected in the 2005 election in the renamed division of Saint-Henri–La Petite-Bourgogne–Pointe-Saint-Charles. Both elections were won by Gérald Tremblay's Montreal Island Citizens Union (MICU), and Hamel served as a member of the opposition. By virtue of serving on city council, Hamel was also a member of the Sud-Ouest borough council; in 2007, she supported a measure to permit bars and restaurants on Monk Street to construct frontal terraces.

In September 2007, Hamel's father, Michel Hamel, was charged with three counts of fraud pertaining to accusations that he had taken money from a local developer in return for seeking to obtain a zoning change. Line Hamel, who described herself as "in shock" at the charges, agreed to stand down from Vision Montreal's caucus and sit as an independent while the matter was before the courts.

Although she resigned from the Vision Montreal caucus in 2007, Hamel did not initially resign from the party itself; she took part in the launch of Vision Montreal's position paper on transit in June 2009. She was not permitted to run under Vision's banner in the 2009 municipal election, however, and instead ran for borough mayor of Le Sud-Ouest as an independent. She lost to Benoit Dorais, Vision's official candidate.

In January 2010, Michel Hamel pleaded guilty to fraud. A Montreal Gazette article reporting on the trial indicates that Line Hamel chaired a local urban planning advisory committee at the time of her father's illegal activity. Line Hamel was not herself accused of any improper activity.

== Electoral record ==
2009 Montreal municipal election: Borough Mayor, Le Sud-Ouest
Party	Candidate	Votes	%
Vision Montreal	Benoit Dorais	4,848	28.41
Union Montreal	Nicole Boudreau	4,821	28.25
Independent	Line Hamel	3,586	21.01
Projet Montréal	Mudi Wa Mbuji Kabeya	3,275	19.19
Independent	Camillien Delisle	537	3.15
Total valid votes		17,067	100
Source: Election results, 2009, City of Montreal.

2005 Montreal municipal election: Councillor, Saint-Henri–La Petite-Bourgogne–Pointe-Saint-Charles
Party	Candidate	Votes	%
Vision Montreal	Line Hamel (incumbent)	3,275	44.56
Montreal Island Citizens Union	Brenda Paris	2,792	37.99
Projet Montréal	Nicole Cloutier	1,283	17.46
Total valid votes		7,350	100
Source: Election results, 2005, City of Montreal.

2001 Montreal municipal election: Councillor, Louis-Cyr
Party	Candidate	Votes	%
Vision Montreal	Line Hamel	4,773	66.97
Montreal Island Citizens Union	Robert Blondin	2,098	29.44
White Elephant Party	Daniel Paré	256	3.59
Total valid votes		7,127	100
Source: Election results, 1833-2005 (in French), City of Montreal.

1998 Montreal municipal election: Councillor, Saint-Henri
Party	Candidate	Votes	%
New Montreal	Germain Prégent (incumbent)	2,016	44.94
Vision Montreal	Line Hamel	1,757	39.17
Team Montreal	Maria-Ines Osses	456	10.16
Democratic Coalition	Jo Lechay	257	5.73
Total valid votes		4,486	100
Source: Official Results, City of Montreal
