= Mary Deros =

Canadian politician

Member of the Montreal Executive Committee responsible for cultural communities
- In office November 2009 – November 2025
- Preceded by: Marie-Andrée Beaudoin

Member of the Montreal Executive Committee responsible for youth
- In office April 2011 – November 2012
- Succeeded by: Émilie Thuillier

Member of the Montreal Executive Committee responsible for community, social development, and families
- In office January 2009 – November 2009
- Preceded by: Marcel Tremblay
- Succeeded by: Lyn Thériault

Member of the Montreal Executive Committee responsible for sports, recreation, social development, and neighbourhoods
- In office 1998–2001
- Preceded by: Martin Lemay (until 1997)
- Succeeded by: Cosmo Maciocia (sports and recreation), Louise O'Sullivan (social development)

Montreal City Councillor for Parc-Extension Ward
- In office 1998–2025
- Preceded by: Konstantinos Georgoulis
- Succeeded by: Elvira Carhuallanqui

Personal details
- Born: Athens, Greece
- Party: Vision Montreal (1998-2007); Union Montreal (2007-2012); Independent (2012-2013); Équipe Denis Coderre (2013–present)

Mary Deros was a municipal politician in Montreal, Quebec, Canada. She represented Parc-Extension on Montreal city council from 1998 until 2025.

Deros was previously an executive committee member in the administrations of Pierre Bourque and Gérald Tremblay. Originally elected as a member of Vision Montreal, Deros subsequently joined Union Montreal before becoming an independent councillor in December 2012; in June 2013, she reaffiliated with Équipe Denis Coderre and stayed with the party as it was renamed Ensemble Montréal.

== Early life and career ==
Deros was born in Athens, Greece, to a family of Greek and Armenian heritage. During the Armenian genocide, her father escaped Turkey to live on the Greek island of Samos. She moved with her family to Montreal in 1958, when she was seven years old. She is fluent in Greek, Armenian, French, and English and was a well-known volunteer in Montreal's Park Extension District, before launching her political career.

== Political career ==
=== Municipal politics ===
Bourque administration

Deros was first elected to Montreal city council for the Parc-Extension division in the 1998 municipal election. Vision Montreal won a council majority in this election under Mayor Bourque's leadership, and Deros was appointed to the executive committee in November 1998 with responsibility for sports, leisure, social development, and neighbourhoods. She also served on the executive committee of the Montreal Regional Health Board. She oversaw the conversion of some municipal baseball fields to soccer parks in 2000, arguing that soccer was becoming a more popular sport in the city. In 2001, she played a major role in organizing Montreal's Greek Independence Day parade.

In September 2000, Deros was appointed as a city representative on the newly formed Montreal Metropolitan Community regional government. In the same period, she supported Mayor Bourque's campaign to merge all Island of Montreal communities into a single municipal government.

Tremblay administration

Deros was re-elected in the 2001 municipal election, in which Vision Montreal was defeated by Gérald Tremblay's Montreal Island Citizens Union (MICU). She stood down from the executive committee with the rest of the Bourque administration and served as an opposition member. She was re-elected to a third term in 2005.

In 2007, Deros led a successful campaign to prevent Montreal's historic Park Avenue from being renamed after former Quebec premier Robert Bourassa. She also campaigned for an indoor soccer venue in the same period.

After serving as a Vision Montreal councillor for nine years, Deros joined Mayor Tremblay's renamed Union Montreal in December 2007. She said that she had considered the move over several months, commenting, "Ever since Mr. Bourque left [in 2006], the party hasn't been the same." On 28 January 2009, Tremblay re-appointed Deros to the Montreal executive committee with responsibility for community, social development, and families.

Deros was re-elected to a fourth term in the 2009 municipal election and was given responsibility for cultural communities following an executive committee shuffle in November 2009. In April 2011, she was given additional responsibilities for youth.

Applebaum and Blanchard administrations

Gérald Tremblay resigned as mayor of Montreal in November 2012 and was replaced by Michael Applebaum. Deros continued as a member of the executive committee, keeping responsibility for cultural communities while relinquishing the youth portfolio. She resigned from Union Montreal on 5 December 2012, saying that she preferred the new mayor's collegial approach to government. Deros kept her position on the executive committee after Laurent Blanchard succeeded Applebaum as interim mayor in June 2013.

By virtue of holding her city council seat, Deros also served on the Villeray—Saint-Michel—Parc-Extension borough council.

=== Federal and provincial politics ===
The Montreal Gazette reported in February 2003 that Deros was considering a candidacy for the provincial Action démocratique du Québec. This rumour came to nothing. She sought the Quebec Liberal Party nomination for a by-election in Laurier-Dorion the following year, but withdrew from the contest prior to the nomination meeting.

In 2007, Deros sought the Liberal Party of Canada nomination in Papineau for the next Canadian federal election. She finished second against Justin Trudeau.

== Electoral history ==
2009 Montreal municipal election: Councillor, Parc-Extension division
Party	Candidate	Votes	%
Union Montreal	(x)Mary Deros	3,476	50.69
Vision Montreal	Costa Zafiropoulos	1,608	23.45
Projet Montréal	Bernarda Klatt	899	13.11
Ethnic Party	George Lemontzoglou	534	7.79
Independent	Moshfiqur Rahman Khan	215	3.14
Parti Montréal Ville-Marie	Sorin Vasile Iftode	126	1.84
Total valid votes		6,858	
Source: Election results, 2009, City of Montreal.

2005 Montreal municipal election: Councillor, Parc-Extension
Party	Candidate	Votes	%
Vision Montreal	Mary Deros (incumbent)	4,631	66.40
Montreal Island Citizens Union	Vanna Vong	1,227	17.59
Independent	Mubashar Rasool	522	7.48
Projet Montréal	Antoine Thomasset-Laperrière	473	6.78
Independent	Conrad David Brillantes	121	1.74
Total valid votes		6,974	100
Source: City of Montreal official results (in French), City of Montreal.

2001 Montreal municipal election: Councillor, Parc-Extension
Party	Candidate	Votes	%
Vision Montreal	Mary Deros (incumbent)	3,819	48.67
Montreal Island Citizens Union	George Vathilakis	2,617	33.35
Independent	Sofoklis Rasoulis	1,410	17.97
Total valid votes		7,846	100
Source: Election results, 1833-2005 (in French), City of Montreal.

1998 Montreal municipal election: Councillor, Parc-Extension
Party	Candidate	Votes	%
Vision Montreal	Mary Deros	2,954	39.61
Montreal 2000	Sofoklis Rasoulis	2,124	28.48
New Montreal	Effie Gournaki	1,123	15.06
Team Montreal	Christos Karidogiannis	765	10.26
Independent	Naveed Anwar	227	3.04
Montreal Citizens' Movement	Thanasi Dionisopoulos	176	2.36
Democratic Coalition	Sylvia d'Apollonia	89	1.19
Total valid votes		7,458	100
Source: Election results, 1833-2005 (in French), City of Montreal.
