= Jo Lechay =

American/Canadian dancer, choreographer, painter

Jo Lechay is a Canadian painter who formerly worked as a professional dancer and choreographer. With her company Danse Jo Lechay, she was known for many years as one of Montreal's most prominent contemporary dancers and her company and choreography enjoyed an international following.

== Early years ==
Lechay was born to an artistic family in the United States; her father was the painter James Lechay. She was raised in Iowa and, after an early interest in sports and competitive swimming, began dancing at age seventeen. She graduated from the State University of Iowa in 1957 and then moved to New York City for more extensive dance training, primarily with Allan Wayne. Two years later, she married writer/director/designer Eugene Lion, who would remain an important and frequent collaborator until his death in April 2013. Together they had two children, experimental video maker and professor of media Jenny Lion and Angel (formerly Anikke) Lion .

Lechay joined Merle Marsicano's dance company in 1960 and remained a fixture of the New York dance scene for many years. After spending four years in Hawaii during the late 1970s, she moved to Montreal in 1980.

Lechay founded the Jo Lechay Dance Company (later renamed as Danse Jo Lechay) in 1975. Over the years, the company would feature dancers such as Andrew de Lotbinière Harwood, Sylvain Émard, her daughter Jenny Lion and Motaz Kabbani. Her organization became known as one of the most innovative in Quebec; in 1995, she remarked, "We really have been pushing (the boundaries). We were among the first to use contact work, to have women lifting men, and to be singing and speaking on stage."

A 1983 review in The Globe and Mail described Lechay as having "an obvious antipathy to prettiness" and of using dance "as an art/act of aggression." The reviewer further described Lechay's creative ambition as "to balance dynamics of jabbing, flailing speed with concentration and attenuation; to look careless while in fact being meticulous; to be ever watchful and thus to fool the enemy." A production from this period entitled Ice was given favourable reviews, although a subsequent work called Take Five received an ambivalent response from the Montreal press.

== Shifting focus ==
Lechay and her collaborator, Eugene Lion, injected more social content into their work in the late 1980s. In 1989, they began creating one-woman interdisciplinary works, with Lion writing, directing and designing and Lechay performing, Their first piece in this style, Goya - The Dream of Reason Produces Monsters, combined dance with storytelling and singing and explored the difficulties of conveying political messages through art. This piece later evolved into Affamée (translated as "starved"), a work which a The Globe and Mail reviewer described as Lechay's "attempt to express her sense of impotence as an artist in the face of political horrors, specifically the torture of families by El Salvador's death squads." A few years later, they launched Lion's work entitled Absolute Zero, with music by Connie Kaldor, described as "a portrait [of] an aging and disillusioned showgirl 50 years from now, when the world is running out of water, ozone and solutions.

In 1995, Lechay premiered a work entitled Augusta, named after her grandmother, an activist who was jailed for anti-Czarist activities in Russia before moving to America in 1905. The work combined dance with painting, and was the subject of a video, À la recherche d'Augusta, released for Montreal's Videos by Women in the Park festival in 1998.

In 1997, Lechay and Paul-André Fortier performed "Out of the Blue," written and directed by Eugene Lion, with costumes designed by François Barbeau. The work was described by a Montreal Gazette reviewer as "high-risk musical theatre for two virtuoso dancer-choreographers who don't stop moving, speaking, singing and dressing for two hours;" she added that it was "the best English-language theatre production [she'd] seen in Montreal in years".

Lechay now divides her time between Montreal and Hornby Island, British Columbia. Retired from professional dance, she continues to use improvisational motion technique in her visual work. In 2013, she was quoted as saying, "I draw and paint best when improvising with my entire body, using my left or right hand, and sometimes both at once."

== Activism ==
Lechay has long been active with environmental concerns and was a member of the groups Action Montréal Vert and Écologie St-Henri in the early 1990s. She stood as a candidate of the small Democratic Coalition party in the 1998 Montreal municipal election.

== Electoral record ==
1998 Montreal municipal election: Councillor, Saint-Pierre
Party	Candidate	Votes	%
New Montreal	Germain Prégent (incumbent)	2,016	44.94
Vision Montreal	Line Hamel	1,757	39.17
Team Montreal	Maria-Ines Osses	456	10.16
Democratic Coalition	Jo Lechay	257	5.73
Total valid votes		4,486	100
Source: Official Results, City of Montreal
