= Dolly Makambo Nawezi =

Congolese politician

Dolly Makambo Nawezi is a politician in the Democratic Republic of the Congo. He has served as mayor of La Gombe in the Kinshasa province since 2008.

Makambo Nawezi lived in Montreal, Quebec, Canada for several years. He ran for election to the Montreal city council as an independent candidate in the 2001 municipal election and was defeated. In the late 2000s, he was a representative in Canada of the People's Party for Reconstruction and Democracy founded by Congolese president Joseph Kabila.

Makambo Nawezi was appointed as mayor of La Gombe by President Kabila on 24 September 2008. On March 8, 2011 (International Women's Day), he inaugurated a memorial in Gombe to Mpongo Love, a Congolese singer who died in 1990.

== Electoral record ==
Canada

2001 Montreal municipal election: Councillor, Saint-Léonard (three members elected)
Party	Candidate	Votes	%
Montreal Island Citizens Union	Frank Zampino	20,279	26.29
Montreal Island Citizens Union	Yvette Bissonnet	18,438	23.90
Montreal Island Citizens Union	Dominic Perri	16,818	21.80
Vision Montreal	Vincenzo Arciresi	7,555	9.79
Vision Montreal	Basilio Giordano	6,417	8.32
Vision Montreal	Louise Blackburn	6,190	8.02
White Elephant Party	Denis Fournier	896	1.16
Independent	Dolly N. Makambo	557	0.72
Total valid votes		77,150	100
Source: Election results, 1833-2005 (in French), City of Montreal.
