= Yvette Bissonnet =

Canadian politician

Yvette Bissonnet is a politician in Montreal, Quebec, Canada. She was a member of the Montreal city council from 2001 to 2009, serving as a member of the Montreal Island Citizens Union (MICU; renamed Union Montreal in 2007). She had previously served on the Saint-Leonard council before that city's amalgamation into Montreal.

Bissonnet is married to Michel Bissonnet, a former Liberal member of the National Assembly of Quebec and the current borough mayor of Saint-Leonard. She worked as an administrative secretary before seeking public office.

== Early political career ==
Bissonnet was first elected to the Saint-Leonard council in the 1986 municipal election, winning a narrow victory in the city's seventh ward as a member of mayor Raymond Renaud's Ralliement de Saint-Léonard (RdSL). She was forty-six years old during this campaign. The RdSL won ten out of twelve seats on council, and Bissonnet initially served as a supporter of Renaud's administration.

In May 1988, Frank Zampino and seven other RdSL councillors resigned from the party to sit as independents. Bissonnet was one of the rebel councillors; she later joined Zampino's Parti Municipal and was re-elected under its banner in the 1990 municipal election.

The Parti Municipal dominated political life in Saint-Leonard during the 1990s, and Bissonnet was returned without opposition in the 1994 and 1998 elections.

== Montreal city councillor ==
Saint-Leonard was amalgamated into the City of Montreal in 2001, and Bissonnet was elected as one of the community's three representatives to the Montreal city council in that year's municipal election. The Montreal Island Citizens Union won a majority on council, and Bissonnet supported new mayor Gérald Tremblay's administration. She was deputy mayor from January to April 2002, from September to December 2002, and again from May to August 2003, and served on the Montreal Transit Corporation. She was re-elected in the 2005 municipal election also served as interim borough mayor of Saint-Leonard in 2008, following Zampino's resignation.

In 2005, Bissonnet introduced a resolution at a meeting of the Saint-Leonard borough council to approve a twenty-year contract for the Dessau subsidiary Sogep to manage the community's parks, pavilions, and tennis courts. The resolution was approved. In 2009, the Montreal Gazette reported that Saint-Leonard was paying $1.06 million more under this arrangement than under its previous contract.

Bissonnet did not seek re-election in 2009.

== Electoral record ==
2005 Montreal municipal election: Councillor, Saint-Léonard-Est
Party	Candidate	Votes	%
Montreal Island Citizens Union	Yvette Bissonnet (incumbent)	5,682	75.95
Vision Montreal	Hugues Surprenant	1,533	20.49
White Elephant Party	Alain Perrier	266	3.56
Total valid votes		7,481	100
Source: City of Montreal official results (in French), City of Montreal.

2001 Montreal municipal election: Councillor, Saint-Léonard (three members elected)
Party	Candidate	Votes	%
Montreal Island Citizens Union	Frank Zampino	20,279	26.29
Montreal Island Citizens Union	Yvette Bissonnet	18,438	23.90
Montreal Island Citizens Union	Dominic Perri	16,818	21.80
Vision Montreal	Vincenzo Arciresi	7,555	9.79
Vision Montreal	Basilio Giordano	6,417	8.32
Vision Montreal	Louise Blackburn	6,190	8.02
White Elephant Party	Denis Fournier	896	1.16
Independent	Dolly N. Makambo	557	0.72
Total valid votes		77,150	100
Source: Election results, 1833-2005 (in French), City of Montreal.

1998 Saint-Leonard municipal election: Councillor, Ward Seven
Party	Candidate	Votes	%
Parti Municipal	(x)Yvette Bissonnet	accl.	
Source: Irwin Block, "Second acclamation in a row for Zampino," Montreal Gazette, 15 October 1998, A6.

1994 Saint-Leonard municipal election: Councillor, Ward Seven
Party	Candidate	Votes	%
Parti Municipal	(x)Yvette Bissonnet	accl.	
Source: Mike King, "Voting results: the final count," Montreal Gazette, 8 November 1994, A4.

1990 Saint-Leonard municipal election: Councillor, Ward Seven
Party	Candidate	Votes	%
Parti Municipal	(x)Yvette Bissonnet	elected	
Source: Irwin Block, "St. Leonard votes for change as Cote St. Luc re-elects Lang," Montreal Gazette, 5 November 1990, A5.

1986 Saint-Leonard municipal election: Councillor, Ward Seven
Party	Candidate	Votes	%
Ralliement de Saint-Léonard	Yvette Bissonnet	790	41.27
Unité de Saint-Léonard	Remi Boyer	772	40.33
Rassemblement des citoyens et citoyennes de Saint-Léonard	Vincent Rizzuto	182	9.51
Équipe démocratique de Saint-Léonard	Micheline Neveu-Dumontet	170	8.88
Total valid votes		1,914	100
Source: "Results of council elections in 18 Montreal-area municipalities," Montreal Gazette, 3 November 1986, A8.
