= Germain Prégent =

Canadian politician and entrepreneur from Montreal

Germain Prégent (19 October 1926 – 15 January 2015) was a politician and entrepreneur in Montreal, Quebec, Canada. He represented the Saint-Henri neighbourhood on the Montreal city council from 1978 to 2001 and served on the Montreal executive committee (i.e., the municipal cabinet) during Pierre Bourque's administration.

== Early life and private career ==
Prégent was born and raised in Saint-Henri. He operated a grocery store until 1971, when the site was appropriated by the city. He later opened a restaurant, and he ran an upscale men's clothing store in Saint-Henri from 1981 to 1994.

== City councillor ==
=== Drapeau administration ===
Prégent was first elected to city council in the 1978 municipal election as a member of mayor Jean Drapeau's Civic Party of Montreal. He was re-elected in 1982, receiving the largest majority anywhere in the city. Drapeau's party held a majority on council in this period, and Prégent served as a pro-administration backbencher. He was appointed as a director of the municipal housing office during the 1980s and also became a board member of Habitations Jeanne Mance in 1985.

When asked to name the highlight of his career in the Drapeau administration, Prégent cited his successful battle in 1980 to keep dépanneurs out of gas stations. Some of his Civic Party colleagues later remarked that they seldom heard Prégent speak in caucus or in the council chambers.

=== Doré administration ===
Drapeau retired in 1986, and the Civic Party suffered an overwhelming defeat in the 1986 municipal election: Prégent was the party's only candidate returned to council. His re-election was ascribed largely to his personal popularity, and newspaper reports noted that he did not mention the Civic Party in his campaign materials. After the campaign, Prégent said that Drapeau had been largely responsible for the party's defeat and that the Civic Party needed to become more democratic.

Leader of the opposition

Jean Doré's Montreal Citizens' Movement (MCM) won a landslide majority in the 1986 election, winning fifty-five of fifty-eight seats. Prégent was joined in opposition by independent councillor Nick Auf der Maur and by Sofoklis Rasoulis of the Montreal Municipal Democratic Alliance. Prégent served as the official leader of the opposition. He was also offered the vice-chairmanship of Montreal's planning committee but declined, saying that he was too busy.

At the first council meeting after the election, the Doré administration announced that it would introduce a moment of silence to replace the Roman Catholic prayer that had previously opened council meetings. Prégent criticized the change as "a lack of respect for all people who believe in God." He cast the sole vote against various municipal expenditures a few months later, arguing that the city should instead prioritize a property tax cut.

In 1988, Prégent served on a council committee that studied a fluoridation plan for Montreal's water. He only attended one committee meeting, the final one, in which he cast a key vote that blocked the plan from advancement.

By all accounts, Prégent was not a successful opposition leader. A Montreal Gazette article written on the one-year anniversary of the 1986 election described him as an "unassuming man who openly admits he dislikes rough-and-tumble politics," and an editorial published in 1988 described him as an "undistinguished and uninspired councillor."

Civic Party troubles

After the 1986 election, the Civic Party became divided between traditionalist supporters of Drapeau and a modernizing group led by Claude Dupras, his successor as party leader. Notwithstanding Prégent's previous criticisms of Drapeau, he soon became aligned with the traditionalist faction.

In January 1988, Prégent announced that he had no confidence in Dupras's leadership and called for the party to hold a leadership convention as soon as possible. He later added that he favoured Yvon Lamarre as party leader and that he would be prepared to leave the Civic Party in order to join a new party with Lamarre at its helm. In response, Dupras criticized Prégent's performance on council and ordered him to either stop his criticisms or leave the party.

Dupras consolidated his hold over the Civic Party in August 1988, removing four Drapeau loyalists from the party executive. Shortly thereafter, Prégent informed the media that he planned to leave the party at the next council meeting. He later changed his mind, however, and promised to initiate a legal battle if the party leadership tried to expel him. Prégent was replaced as opposition leader during this period by Nick Auf der Maur, whom Dupras had recruited to be the Civic Party's lead spokesperson in council.

Prégent finally resigned from the Civic Party in November 1988, saying that he saw no reason to continue as a member. He continued to serve on council as an independent.

The Civic Party's troubles continued after Prégent's departure, and Dupras resigned as Civic Party leader in January 1989, acknowledging that he lacked the charisma to be an effective leader. Prégent later speculated that he might return to his former party, though he ultimately chose not to do so.

Second term

Prégent contested the 1990 municipal election as an independent and was re-elected without difficulty. Doré and the MCM won a second consecutive landslide majority.

The Civic Party again elected only one member in 1990, but it returned to official opposition status in 1992 after several opposition councillors joined the party. Prégent again suggested that he might return to the party, but he once again chose not to. The Civic Party later collapsed internally after this temporary resurgence, and by the 1994 municipal election it had ceased to exist.

In August 1992, Prégent said that he supported the city's continued ownership of the Atwater public market in his ward.

=== Bourque administration ===
Prégent joined Pierre Bourque's newly formed Vision Montreal party in 1994 and ran under its banner in the 1994 municipal election. He was re-elected by a landslide, as Bourque's team won a majority on council.

Executive committee member

Bourque was sworn in as mayor in November 1994 and named Prégent as a member of the Montreal executive committee with responsibility for youth, architecture, and engineering. Prégent was also given sector responsibility for southwest Montreal.

In 1995, Prégent announced a call for tenders for the construction of new holding pools and sewer pipes in southwest Montreal, a project valued at $12.8 million. He indicated that the work was scheduled to be completed the following year and added that he would have resigned had Bourque not addressed the issue. (Newspaper reports noted that the project had actually been announced, and its funding secured, during the Doré administration.)

Prégent also oversaw a $17 million project to construct a new four-lane bridge on Montreal's Wellington tunnel and, until 1996, was responsible for navigating a plan to restructure the city's fire department. He later criticized a deal that Bourque's administration concluded with the city's firefighters in 1998, describing it as "a very bad deal signed for electoral purposes and to buy peace."

In early 1996, Prégent indicated that the Bourque administration was not considering the fluoridation of Montreal's water. Separate from his responsibilities on the executive committee, he opposed plans to construct a mega-store in competition with the Atwater market.

Departure from Vision Montreal and re-election

Prégent resigned from Vision Montreal to serve as an independent councillor in July 1997, saying that Bourque's party lacked leadership. This decision occurred against the backdrop of an internal party crisis that temporarily cost the mayor his majority on council.

There are conflicting reports as to how long Prégent remained a member of Montreal's executive committee. Some newspaper reports indicate that he only served from 1994 to 1996, but this is contradicted by reports from July 1997 that continue to identify him as a member. One report newspaper report indicates that he remained a member through to 1998, even after his resignation from Vision Montreal. It is certain that Prégent was no longer an executive councillor after the 1998 election and probable that he was not responsible for any specific area of governance after July 1997.

In May 1998, Prégent became one of four sitting councillors to join the upstart New Montreal party led by Jacques Duchesneau. He ran under the party's banner in the 1998 municipal election and was re-elected in the most difficult competition of his career. Vision Montreal won a second consecutive majority under Bourque's leadership, while Prégent was one of only three New Montreal candidates to be returned.

Final term

After the 1998 election, Prégent was appointed as vice-chair of Montreal's public services committee. He approved of Bourque's decision to waive restrictions on condominium conversions in Saint-Henri, though he strongly opposed plans to permit a private company to construct a garbage transfer depot in the neighbourhood.

Prégent resigned from New Montreal in January 2000, describing it "a party that's going nowhere." He added that his comments were not intended as criticism of Duchesneau's leadership. For the remainder of his term, he once again served as an independent councillor.

Prégent suffered a stroke in March 2000. He later recovered and was able to return to his council responsibilities in January 2001. He retired at the 2001 municipal election, giving an endorsement to Gérald Tremblay's newly formed Montreal Island Citizens Union.

The Montreal Gazette portrayed Prégent in a more favourable light toward the end of his career, with a March 1999 editorial describing him as having "a way of getting things done quietly and without a whole lot of democratic ceremony." In 2001, progressive councillor Marvin Rotrand described Prégent as "basically a conservative" with whom he had "absolutely nothing in common socially, culturally or politically," though he added that he considered Prégent a "nice guy" on a personal level.

== After politics ==
In 2012, the city inaugurated a room in Prégent's honour at the Gadbois recreation complex.

== Death ==
Prégent died on 15 January 2015.

== Electoral record ==
1998 Montreal municipal election: Councillor, Saint-Henri
Party	Candidate	Votes	%
New Montreal	Germain Prégent (incumbent)	2,016	44.94
Vision Montreal	Line Hamel	1,757	39.17
Team Montreal	Maria-Ines Osses	456	10.16
Democratic Coalition	Jo Lechay	257	5.73
Total valid votes		4,486	100
Source: Official Results, City of Montreal

1994 Montreal municipal election: Councillor, Saint-Henri
Party	Candidate	Votes	%
Vision Montreal	Germain Prégent (incumbent)	2,713	71.13
Montreal Citizens' Movement	Benoît St-Jean	678	17.78
Montrealers' Party	Dave Schuilenburg	224	5.87
Democratic Coalition–Ecology Montreal	Michael Chamberlain	199	5.22
Total valid votes		3,814	100
Source: Official Results, City of Montreal

1990 Montreal municipal election: Councillor, Saint-Henri
Party	Candidate	Votes	%
Independent	Germain Prégent (incumbent)	2,553	67.92
Montreal Citizens' Movement	Germaine Vaillancourt	564	15.00
Civic Party of Montreal	Louise Brison	283	7.53
Ecology Montreal	Marlène Lavoie	244	6.49
Municipal Party	Dianne Boyer	115	3.06
Total valid votes		3,759	100
Source: Election results, 1833-2005 (in French), City of Montreal.

1986 Montreal municipal election: Councillor, Saint-Henri
Party	Candidate	Votes	%
Civic Party of Montreal	Germain Prégent (incumbent)	3,165	58.41
Montreal Citizens' Movement	Kevin Cadloff	2,254	41.59
Total valid votes		5,419	100
Source: Election results, 1833-2005 (in French), City of Montreal.

1982 Montreal municipal election: Councillor, Saint-Henri
Party	Candidate	Votes	%
Civic Party of Montreal	Germain Prégent (incumbent)	4,379	73.61
Montreal Citizens' Movement	Raymond Drennan	960	16.14
Municipal Action Group	Jean-Louis Durocher	610	10.25
Total valid votes		5,949	100
Source: Election results, 1833-2005 (in French), City of Montreal.

1978 Montreal municipal election: Councillor, Saint-Henri
Party	Candidate	Votes	%
Civic Party of Montreal	Germain Prégent	4,177	69.02
Municipal Action Group	Huguette Langevin	1,263	20.87
Montreal Citizens' Movement	Pierre Roberge	612	10.11
Total valid votes		6,052	100
Source: Election results, 1833-2005 (in French), City of Montreal. Party identifications are taken from Le Devoir, 11 November 1978.
