= Parti Montréal 2000 =

The Parti Montréal 2000 (English: Montreal 2000 Party) was a municipal political party in Montreal, Quebec, Canada. It fielded a mayoral candidate and candidates for city council in the 1998 Montreal municipal election. The party's founder, leader, and mayoral candidate was Michel Bédard.

== History ==
Montreal 2000 was founded in 1998 as a successor party to the Parti éléphant blanc de Montréal (English: White Elephant Party), a novelty party that Bédard had established in 1989. The White Elephant Party was similar in some respects to the Rhinoceros Party of Canada, though it often used its humorous campaigns to draw attention to serious issues. The Montreal Gazette newspaper described Montreal 2000 as "a joke party of the past reincarnated as a semi-serious fringe group."

In launching his campaign, Bédard described Montreal 2000 as "the only party whose sole commitment is to the entire Montreal population and not to private interests." He proposed free public transportation for welfare recipients and the unemployed, and promised to create a new arts centre in place of a run-down factory at the corner of Rene Levesque Blvd. and de Lorimier Ave. Later in the campaign, he promised an emergency municipal fund to attack poverty and said he would petition the provincial government to end the practice of reimbursing half the election expenses of candidates who receive twenty per cent support or higher from the electorate.

Bédard polled at 2.2% and 3.6% in two September 1998 mayoral polls. On election day, he finished a distant fifth with 0.96% support.

The party ran twenty candidates for city council. One candidate, Sofoklis Rasoulis, was a former council member, and Bédard acknowledged that Rasoulis represented the party's best hope of winning a seat on council and hence receiving a municipally funded research budget. Ultimately, none of the party's candidates was elected.

Bédard changed Montreal 2000's name back to the White Elephant Party to contest the 2001 municipal election.
