= Pierre Goyer =

Canadian politician

Pierre Goyer is a Canadian politician and a city councillor in Montreal, Quebec.

== City councillor ==
He was elected to Montreal's city council as a Montreal Citizens' Movement (RCM) candidate in the district of Jean-Talon in 1986, defeating the incumbent, George Savoidakis, of the Civic Party of Montreal. In 1989, he left the RCM and founded the Democratic Coalition of Montreal with three other colleagues.

He was re-elected in the district of Saint-Édouard in 1990. In 1992, he left the Coalition with colleague Claudette Demers-Godley to sit as an Independent.

== Member of Executive Committee ==
In 1994, Goyer ran as a Vision Montreal candidate. He was re-elected and became a member of Montreal's Executive Committee. In 1997, he was asked to resign from the Executive Committee. He left Vision Montreal and sat as an [independent, but refused to resign from the Executive Committee.

== Political decline ==
In 1998, he ran as a candidate for Jean Doré's Team Montreal but was defeated by François Purcell.

== See also ==
- Vision Montreal Crisis, 1997

Political offices
Preceded by George Savoidakis (Civic Party)	City Councillor, District of Jean Talon; 1986-1990	Succeeded by The district was abolished in 1990.
Preceded by Jacques Mondou (RCM)	City Councillor, District of Saint-Édouard; 1990-1998	Succeeded by François Purcell (Vision Montreal)
