= Suzanne Caron =

Suzanne Caron is a former mayor and councillor of Mount Royal in the city of Montreal. First elected as a councillor in 1999, she was elected borough mayor as a candidate for Gérald Tremblay's Montreal Island Citizens' Union when the Quebec government merged all the municipalities on the island of Montreal into one city in 2001. In 2003, she left the party over differences in the level of decentralization to the boroughs, and subsequently led the Yes side in the following demerger referendum.

She sought election as mayor of the reconstituted Town of Mount Royal, but lost to former mayor Vera Danyluk, since deceased.
