= Parti éléphant blanc de Montréal =

Canadian municipal party (1989–2009)

The Parti éléphant blanc de Montréal (PÉBM) (English: White Elephant Party of Montreal) was a fringe political party in Montreal, Quebec, Canada, that existed for most of the period from 1989 to 2009.

== Origins ==
The PÉBM was created by Michel Bédard in August 1989, with the stated purpose of giving Montrealers an alternative in the 1990 municipal election. A party spokesperson said that it would "half humorous, half serious" and "use humor to make a serious point." Although similar in some respects to the Rhinoceros Party of Canada and the Parti citron, it was not formally aligned with those parties.

== Campaigns ==
The PÉBM ran Bédard as its mayoral candidate in the 1990 municipal election and fielded a number of candidates for the Montreal city council. The party's election literature was filled with puns and jokes, including a pledge to use its tusks to skewer "elected officials who never open their mouths except to yawn and never stand except to go to the bathroom." This notwithstanding, Bédard also focused on poverty and hunger issues, promising to start a line of government-owned restaurants to feed the poor with surplus foods from restaurants and bakeries. During the election, the PÉBM also promised to turn parking lots into green spaces, ban neon signs and advertisements on bus terminals, and increase heritage protection.

The party again fielded Bédard as its mayoral candidate in the 1994 municipal election, in which capacity he presided over total party electoral budget of only one thousand dollars. During this campaign, Bédard described the party's name as follows: "The white elephant is the only animal that doesn't fear its rivals because it is thought to be the wisest and most serene animal of all. It's a symbol of prosperity, security and confidence, all of which are very important qualities in a political party. And the color of the animal we have chosen as our symbol is white, because we are still pure. We are not corrupt like many other political parties out there." He again focused on food issues and promoted a by-law that would have required restaurants to give their surplus food to food banks.

Bédard changed the PÉBM's name to the Parti Montréal 2000 the 1998 municipal election but returned to the original name for 2001. In the latter campaign, he was forcibly ejected from at least two mayoral debates to which he had not been formally invited. He once again focused on food issues, and also pledged more support for community groups that assist prostitutes and drug addicts.

After using the PÉBM designation again in 2005, Bédard changed the party's name to Parti Fierté Montréal in 2009.

During its existence, no PÉBM candidate has ever came close to winning an election.
