= Beaconsfield–Baie-D'Urfé =

Beaconsfield–Baie-D'Urfé is a former borough in the West Island area of Montreal, Quebec. It was composed of the municipalities of Beaconsfield and Baie-D'Urfé through a forced merger on 1 January 2002.

On 20 June 2004, both Beaconsfield and Baie-D'Urfé voted to return to being independent municipalities, effective 1 January 2006.

== See also ==
- List of former boroughs of Montreal
- Montreal Merger
- Municipal reorganization in Quebec
