= Nouveau Montréal =

Former political party in Montreal, Canada

Nouveau Montréal (abbreviation: NM; English: New Montreal) was a municipal political party in Montreal, Quebec, Canada, from 1998 to 2001. The party was led by Jacques Duchesneau, who was also its candidate for mayor in the 1998 municipal election.

== Origins ==
Duchesneau announced the formation of Nouveau Montréal on 29 April 1998, shortly after standing down from a four-year term as the city's police director. At the time, public opinion polls in Montreal showed Duchesneau leading incumbent mayor Pierre Bourque and all other potential candidates for the position. Duchesneau's control of Nouveau Montréal was never in question, and some critics charged that it was more his personal electoral vehicle than a proper political party.

Sitting city councillors Jack Chadirdjian, Germain Prégent, Marie Lebeau, Pierre Gagnier, Louise Roy, and Robert Laramée joined Nouveau Montréal soon after its founding, giving the party representation from both the centre-right and centre-left. This allowed the party to become the Official Opposition on council on 25 May 1998, with Chadirdjian serving as leader of the party's council grouping. Independent councillor Michael Applebaum joined the party shortly thereafter, and Philippe Bissonnette also joined before the election. Another councillor, Thérèse Daviau, decided against seeking re-election and did not join the party, but supported it from the outside.

== Platform ==
Duchesneau focused Nouveau Montréal's campaign on tax reform, decentralized government services, and urban renewal to prevent a flight to the suburbs. He stated his opposition to privatizing essential municipal services (though allowing for the privatization of the city's real-estate corporations), promised five hundred units of social and co-operative housing and a task force on public transformation, and said that he would not promote expensive mega-projects. On labour issues, he promised not to lay off blue-collar workers and to reassign municipal service workers by geographical area rather than department. Duchesneau promoted socially liberal views, and his party's candidates included anti-poverty activists and representatives of the city's LGBT community.

The party held its first convention on 28 June 1998, attended by at least six hundred people. At this meeting, Duchesneau promised to focus on cleaning up the city's abandoned lots, create "district mayors" with responsibility for services like snow removal, and seek a new financial deal with the provincial government. He later promised to freeze municipal taxes for four years by cutting some municipal services.

Duchesneau initially opposed a municipal subsidy for the financially troubled Montreal Expos baseball team, though he later reversed his position on this issue.

== 1998 election ==
Duchesneau's poll numbers began slipping in late September 1998, as incumbent mayor Pierre Bourque's popularity ratings increased. Shortly before election day, rival candidate Jean Doré openly speculated that he might withdraw from the contest and either give his support to Duchesneau or form an alliance between the two campaigns. Doré ultimately chose to remain a candidate. Duchesneau himself sought to create an alliance with Montreal Citizens' Movement mayoral candidate Michel Prescott, but was rebuffed. Following these developments, some in the media suggested that Duchesneau, Doré, and Prescott would split the opposition vote and allow Bourque's re-election.

Despite receiving an endorsement from the Montreal Gazette, Duchesneau finished second against Bourque on election day. Only three of the party's candidates for council were elected: Michael Applebaum, Philippe Bissonnette, and Germain Prégent.

== Aftermath ==
Duchesneau remained as party leader after the election and said that Nouveau Montréal would continue despite its defeat. In March 1999, he confirmed that he intended to be the party's candidate the next election, which was then scheduled for in 2002. During the same period, Duchesneau said that he would support amalgamating all municipalities on the Island of Montreal, Laval, and parts of the South Shore into a single city.

In January 2000, Bissonnette and Prégent resigned from the party to sit as independents. Prégent remarked that, while he had objection to Duchesneau, he did not believe the party was going anywhere. Duchesneau resigned as party leader in January 2001, saying that he was withdrawing from public life. The party became largely dormant after this time and did not field candidates in the 2001 municipal election.
