= L'Île-Bizard–Sainte-Geneviève–Sainte-Anne-de-Bellevue =

L'Île-Bizard–Sainte-Geneviève–Sainte-Anne-de-Bellevue (French pronunciation: [lil bizaʁ sɛ̃t ʒənvjɛv sɛ̃t an də bɛlvy]) is a former borough of the city of Montreal, Quebec, in the West Island area.

The borough was created following the municipal mergers of 2002 and consisted of the former municipalities of L'Île-Bizard, Sainte-Geneviève, and Sainte-Anne-de-Bellevue. The latter two are widely separated portions of the Island of Montreal, and the first is a separate island, the largest of the City of Montreal besides the Island of Montreal itself.

Upon the demerger in 2006, the town of Sainte-Anne-de-Bellevue voted to separate from the city of Montreal. The remainder of the borough remained in Montreal and became the borough of L'Île-Bizard–Sainte-Geneviève.

== See also ==
- List of former boroughs
- Montreal Merger
- Municipal reorganization in Quebec
