= 2002–2006 municipal reorganization of Montreal =

Merger and demerger of municipalities on the Island of Montreal, Quebec

Montreal was one of the cities in Quebec affected by the 2000–2006 municipal reorganization in Quebec. On January 1, 2002, all the municipalities on the island of Montreal were merged into the city of Montreal.

However, following a change of government in the 2003 Quebec election and a 2004 referendum, some of those municipalities became independent cities again on January 1, 2006. The recreated cities did not regain all of their previous powers, however. A new urban agglomeration of Montreal was created, which resulted in the recreated cities still sharing certain municipal services with Montreal.

== Merger and demerger ==
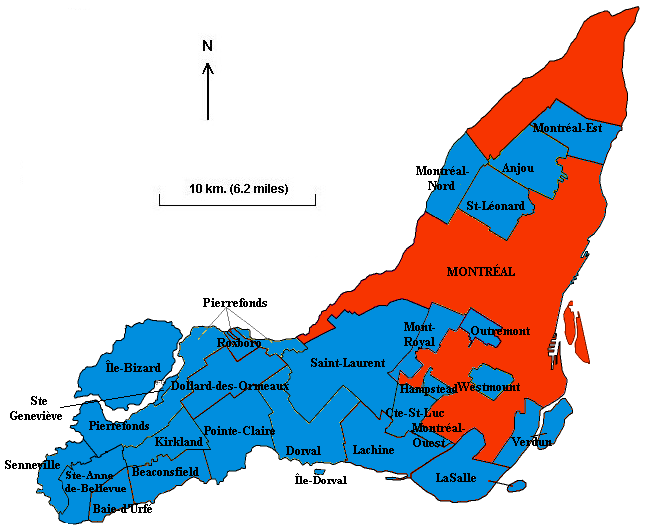
Municipalities existing in 2001: City of Montreal (186 square kilometres (72 sq mi)) and 27 independent municipalities

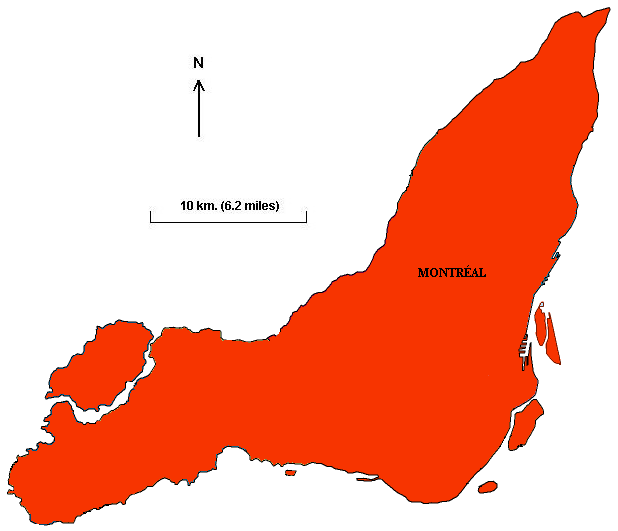
Island of Montreal on January 1, 2002, after the merger. (500 square kilometres (190 sq mi))

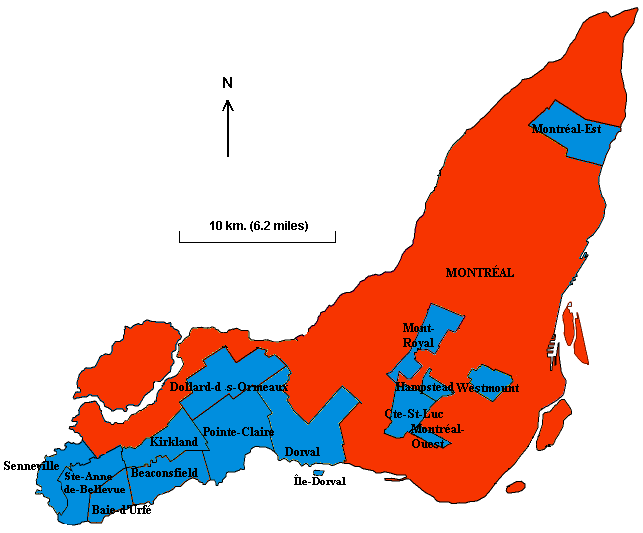
Island of Montreal as of January 1, 2006: City of Montreal (366 square kilometres (141 sq mi)) and 15 independent municipalities

Municipal evolution on Montreal Island (2001-2006).

=== Une île, une ville ===
Until 2001, the island of Montreal was divided into the city of Montreal proper and 27 smaller municipalities. These formed the Montreal Urban Community (MUC). On January 1, 2002, all 28 municipalities on the island were merged into the "megacity" of Montreal, under the slogan "Une île, une ville" ("One island, one city"). This merger was part of a larger provincial scheme launched by the Parti Québécois all across Quebec, resulting in the merging of many municipalities. It was felt that larger municipalities would be more efficient, and would be more able to withstand comparison with the other cities in Canada, which had already expanded their territory—most notably Toronto, which had merged with the other municipalities of what was then dubbed "Metro Toronto" in 1998-1999 (the GTA is the larger regional area including Toronto and the surrounding cities).

As happened elsewhere in Canada, the merger was opposed by many residents on the island of Montreal. The situation on the island of Montreal was further complicated by the presence of predominantly English-speaking municipalities that were due to merge with the predominantly French-speaking city of Montreal. English speakers were afraid to lose their rights, despite claims by the mayor of Montreal that their linguistic rights would remain protected in the new city of Montreal. Many street protests were organized, lawsuits were filed, and 15 municipalities appealed to the Court of Appeal of Quebec. It was all to no avail. In Canada, municipal governments are creatures of the provincial governments, and provincial governments have the power to create and dissolve municipalities by ordinary statute.

At the 2001 census, the city of Montreal (185.94 km^{2}/71.80 sq. miles) had 1,039,534 inhabitants. After the merger, the population of the new city of Montreal (500.05 km^{2}/193.10 sq. miles) was 1,812,723 (based on 2001 census figures). The post merger city was 169% larger in terms of land area, and had 74% more people. For comparisons, at the 2001 census the city of Toronto (629.91 km^{2}/243.20 sq. miles) had 2,481,494 inhabitants.

The merged city of Montreal was divided into 27 boroughs (known in French as "arrondissements") in charge of local administration. The city government was responsible for larger matters such as economic development or transportation issues. It is only a coincidence that there were 27 independent municipalities before 2002, and 27 arrondissements in the merged entity. In fact, in most areas the arrondissements did not correspond to the former municipalities, cutting across the territory of the former municipalities.

=== Demerger ===
At the provincial elections of April 2003, the Quebec Liberal Party defeated the Parti Québécois. One central plank of the Liberal campaign was that if elected, they would allow merged municipalities to organize referendums in order to demerge if they wished to do so. As promised, on June 20, 2004, the referendums were held throughout Quebec.

The process to demerge was complicated. (see 2004 Quebec municipal referendums and 2000–2006 municipal reorganization in Quebec) The first stage was to sign a register in order for a referendum to be held, then the population had to vote a second time. In several areas, the referendums failed because even though a majority of those voting supported demerging, it did not meet the required threshold of 35% of registered voters.

On the island of Montreal, referendums were held in 22 of the 27 previously independent municipalities. Following the referendum results, 15 of the previously independent municipalities have regained most of their independence. These are predominantly English-speaking municipalities, with also some French-speaking municipalities. Oddly, one of the 15 municipalities recreated, L'Île-Dorval, had no permanent inhabitants at the 2001 census, being a cottaging island.

The demerger took place on January 1, 2006. After this date, there were 16 municipalities on the island of Montreal—the city of Montreal proper plus 15 independent municipalities. The current city of Montreal comprises the pre-2002 city of Montreal plus 12 of the previously independent municipalities, and is divided into 19 arrondissements. The post-demerger city of Montreal has a territory of 366.02 km^{2} (141.3 sq. miles) and a population of 1,583,590 inhabitants (based on 2001 census figures). Compared with the pre-merger city of Montreal, this is a net increase of 96.8% in land area, and 52.3% in population. Compared with the post-merger city of Montreal, however, this is a net decrease of 26.8% in land area, and 12.64% in population.

Corporate lobbies close to the Liberal Party of Quebec stress the fact that after the demerger, the city of Montreal still has almost as many (approx. 88%) inhabitants as the "megacity" of Montreal (the suburban municipalities to be recreated are less densely populated than the core city), and that the overwhelming majority of industrial sites will still be located on the territory of the post-demerger city of Montreal. The post-demerger city of Montreal will be slightly greater than half the size of the post-1998 merger city of Toronto, with roughly two thirds its size in terms of population reflecting higher population density in Montreal even including those 'suburban' municipalities which opted not to demerge.

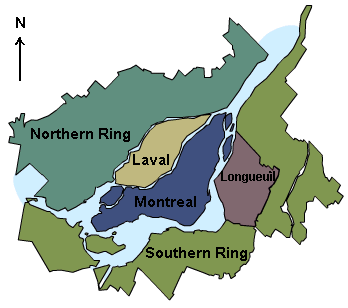
Metropolitan Community of Montreal and its five constituent parts

However, both the Liberal government of Quebec and the municipality of Montreal made it clear that the 15 reconstituted municipalities would not have as many powers as before the 2002 merger, even though Charest had promised complete de-amalgamation during the 2003 campaign. As with the other de-merged municipalities across Quebec, the recreated municipalities remained tied to Montreal via the newly created urban agglomeration of Montreal. While the recreated municipalities regained most of their former powers, major expenses such as police, fire and maintenance of main streets remained with the Montreal Agglomeration Council, a joint board covering the entire island of Montreal. The city of Montreal controls a supermajority of votes on the board.

There is still controversy focusing on the cost of demerging. Several studies show that the recreated municipalities will incur substantial financial costs, thus forcing them to increase taxes, though proponents of the demerger contest these studies.

The island of Montreal is only one component of the Montreal Metropolitan Community (French: Communauté métropolitaine de Montréal), in charge of planning, coordinating, and financing economic development, public transportation, garbage collection, etc., across the metropolitan area of Montreal. The Metropolitan Community of Montreal covers 3,839 km^{2} (1,482 sq. miles), with 3,431,551 inhabitants living inside its borders in 2002; it is thus larger in area and population than the city of Toronto (even after its 1998 merger). However, the city of Toronto is larger than the city of Montreal proper, and Toronto's metro area (not a legal entity) is larger than the Montreal Metropolitan Community, with 7,000 square kilometres (2,700 sq mi) and 5.8 million people. The president of the Montreal Metropolitan Community is the mayor of Montreal.

== Municipal evolution on the Island of Montreal (2002–2006) ==
Mergers and demergers on the Island of Montreal (2002-2006)
Boroughs (2002)	Originating from		After 2006 demerger	
Boroughs (2002)	City of Montreal	Other municipalities	Montreal boroughs (2006)	Demerged municipalities
Ahuntsic-Cartierville	✓		Ahuntsic-Cartierville	
Anjou		Anjou	Anjou	
Beaconsfield–Baie-D'Urfé		Beaconsfield		Beaconsfield
Beaconsfield–Baie-D'Urfé		Baie-d'Urfé (Note: Original (but erroneous) official spelling: Baie d'Urfée. Original unofficial spelling, which also became official in 1959: Baie d'Urfé. Spelling further corrected in 2002: Baie-D'Urfé (source: http://linuxfocus.org/~guido/book-a-history-of-the-town-of-baie-d-urfe/then-and-now/#namechange))		Baie-D'Urfé
Côte-des-Neiges–Notre-Dame-de-Grâce	✓		Côte-des-Neiges–Notre-Dame-de-Grâce	
Côte Saint-Luc–Hampstead–Montreal West		Côte Saint-Luc		Côte Saint-Luc
Côte Saint-Luc–Hampstead–Montreal West		Hampstead		Hampstead
Côte Saint-Luc–Hampstead–Montreal West		Montreal West		Montréal West
Dollard-Des Ormeaux–Roxboro		Dollard-des-Ormeaux		Dollard-des-Ormeaux
Dollard-Des Ormeaux–Roxboro		Roxboro	Pierrefonds-Roxboro	
Pierrefonds-Senneville		Pierrefonds	Pierrefonds-Roxboro	
Pierrefonds-Senneville		Senneville		Senneville
Dorval–L'Île-Dorval		Dorval		Dorval
Dorval–L'Île-Dorval		L'Île-Dorval		L'Île-Dorval
Kirkland		Kirkland		Kirkland
Lachine		Lachine	Lachine	
Lachine		Ville Saint-Pierre	Lachine	
LaSalle		LaSalle	LaSalle	
L'Île-Bizard–Sainte-Geneviève–Sainte-Anne-de-Bellevue		L'Île-Bizard	L'Île-Bizard–Sainte-Geneviève	
L'Île-Bizard–Sainte-Geneviève–Sainte-Anne-de-Bellevue		Sainte-Geneviève	L'Île-Bizard–Sainte-Geneviève	
L'Île-Bizard–Sainte-Geneviève–Sainte-Anne-de-Bellevue		Sainte-Anne-de-Bellevue		Sainte-Anne-de-Bellevue
Mercier–Hochelaga-Maisonneuve	✓		Mercier–Hochelaga-Maisonneuve	
Montreal North		Montreal North	Montréal-Nord	
Mount Royal		Mount Royal		Mount Royal
Outremont		Outremont	Outremont	
Le Plateau-Mont-Royal	✓		Le Plateau-Mont-Royal	
Pointe-Claire		Pointe-Claire		Pointe-Claire
Rivière-des-Prairies–Pointe-aux-Trembles–Montréal-Est	✓	Montréal-Est	Rivière-des-Prairies–Pointe-aux-Trembles	
Rivière-des-Prairies–Pointe-aux-Trembles–Montréal-Est	✓	Montréal-Est		Montréal-Est
Rosemont–La Petite-Patrie	✓		Rosemont–La Petite-Patrie	
Saint-Laurent		Saint-Laurent	Saint-Laurent	
Saint Leonard		Saint-Léonard	Saint-Léonard	
Le Sud-Ouest	✓		Le Sud-Ouest	
Verdun		Verdun	Verdun	
Ville-Marie	✓		Ville-Marie	
Villeray–Saint-Michel–Parc-Extension	✓		Villeray–Saint-Michel–Parc-Extension	
Westmount		Westmount		Westmount

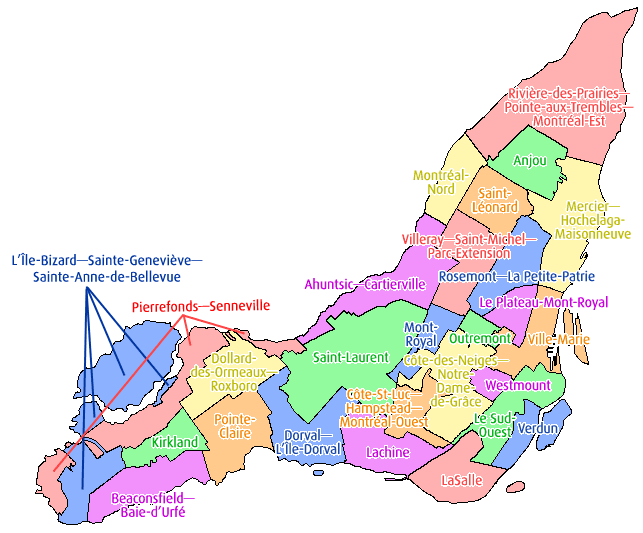
Island of Montreal's 27 boroughs after 2002 merger

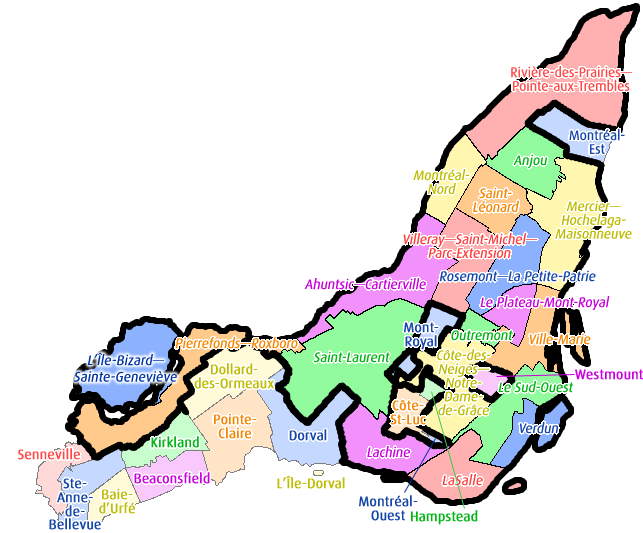
Island of Montreal after 2006 demerger (with 19 boroughs and 14 reconstituted municipalities)

== See also ==
- 21st-century municipal history of Quebec
- 2000–2006 municipal reorganization in Quebec
- 2004 Quebec municipal referendums
- List of former municipalities in Quebec
- Merger (politics)
- History of Montreal
