= Parti Municipal (Saint-Léonard) =

The Parti Municipal (PM) was a political party that existed from 1990 to 2001 in the suburban community of Saint-Leonard in Montreal, Quebec, Canada. It dominated the city's political life throughout its existence.

== Origins ==
The Parti Municipal emerged from a split in mayor Raymond Renaud's governing Ralliement de Saint-Léonard (RdSL) party in May 1988, when Frank Zampino and seven other RdSL councillors resigned to sit as independents. Zampino's rebel group formed a majority on council and dominated its legislative activities for the next two years, even though Renaud continued to serve as mayor.

Zampino formally created the Parti Municipal to contest the 1990 municipal election. He defeated Renaud in the mayoral contest, and the party won ten out of twelve seats on council.

== Governance ==
The Parti Municipal faced little challenge to its political dominance of Saint-Leonard in the 1990s. In March 1994, the two RdSL councillors crossed the floor to join the PM. There were no other organized political parties in the city after this time. Zampino and eight PM councillors were returned without opposition in the 1994 municipal election, while the four remaining PM councillors were re-elected over independent candidates. In the 1998 election, every member of council was re-elected without opposition.

The PM was formally dissolved in 2001, when Saint-Leonard became part of the newly amalgamated City of Montreal. Many party members, including Zampino, became members of Gérald Tremblay's Montreal Island Citizens Union (MICU).
