= Jean-François Plante =

Canadian politician

Jean-François "Jeff" Plante is a Canadian conservative politician and pundit. He's also a radio talk show host, and stood for leadership of the Action démocratique du Québec (ADQ), after Mario Dumont's resignation in 2008. He served as the president of the Conservative Party of Quebec.

== Radio ==
Plante is a co-host, with Max Bradette, on Les Cowboys de la Radio, the main show at 1040 AM Montreal. He is also the program director of the station.

== Municipal politics ==
Plante was elected to Montreal's City Council for the district of Père-Marquette in 1998 with 34% of the vote, defeating incumbent Robert Laramée (33%). In 2001, Plante ran in the district of Louis-Hébert (Rosemont–Petite-Patrie borough). He received 64% of the vote. He did not run for re-election in 2005. Plante was affiliated to the Vision Montréal party of Mayor Pierre Bourque.

== Provincial politics ==
Plante ran as an Action démocratique du Québec (ADQ) candidate for the Basses-Laurentides district of Deux-Montagnes in 2007.

After the ADQ merged with the CAQ, the right wing of the party left to form the Conservative Party of Quebec. Plante was named president. He left the party shortly after.

Political offices
Preceded by Robert Laramée (Independent)	City Councillor, District of Père-Marquette; 1998-2001	Succeeded by The electoral district was abolished.
Preceded by Carl Baillargeon (Vision Montreal)	City Councillor, District of Louis-Hébert; 2001-2005	Succeeded by The electoral district was abolished.
