= Robert Laramée =

Canadian politician

Robert Laramée is a Canadian politician and was a city councillor in Montreal, Quebec.

== Background ==
Laramée holds a Bachelor's degree in Recreation. According to Fugues magazine, he is openly gay.

== City Councillor ==
Laramée successfully ran as Vision Montreal candidate to the City Council in the district of Père-Marquette in 1994 with 52% of the votes. In 1997 he left Vision Montreal to sit as an Independent, as several of his colleagues did. He ran as a candidate of Jacques Duchesneau's Nouveau Montréal in 1998, but lost against Vision Montreal candidate Jean-François Plante with only 33% of the vote.

He was re-elected in the district of Saint-Jacques in 2001 as a Vision Montreal, candidate with 48% of the vote, against incumbent and former colleague Sammy Forcillo (44%).

== Borough mayoral candidate ==
In 2005, Laramée tried to get elected Borough Mayor for Ville-Marie. He lost with 35% of the vote against Benoît Labonté (40%).

== Retirement from political office ==
Laramée has been Vision Montréal Executive Director since 2006.

== See also ==
- Vision Montreal Crisis, 1997

Political offices
Preceded by André Cardinal (RCM)	City Councillor, District of Père-Marquette; 1994-1998	Succeeded by Jean-François Plante (Vision Montreal)
Preceded by Sammy Forcillo (Independent)	City Councillor, District of Saint-Jacques; 2001-2005	Succeeded by The district was merged with Sainte-Marie in 2005.
