= Michel Prescott =

Councillor in Quebec, Canada

Montreal city councillor for the District of Jeanne-Mance
- In office 1982–2009
- Preceded by: Sidney Stevens
- Succeeded by: Richard Bergeron

Personal details
- Political party: Montreal Citizens' Movement

Michel Prescott is a Canadian politician and was a city councillor in Montreal, Quebec for 27 years.

== City councillor ==
Prescott was a member of the progressive Montreal Citizens' Movement, also known as Rassemblement des citoyens et citoyennes de Montréal (RCM) in French. He was elected to Montreal's city council in 1982 against Civic incumbent Sidney Stevens in the district of Jeanne-Mance. Prescott was re-elected in 1986, 1990, 1994 and 1998. He sat as an independent from September 1992 until 1997.

== Party leader ==
In 1998 Prescott lost the RCM nomination for the mayoral election against Thérèse Daviau. But soon after, Daviau left the party and announced that she would support Jacques Duchesneau for mayor. Prescott took over as RCM nominee and Leader of the Opposition.

== Deputy chairmanship ==
In the wake of the province-wide municipal merger of 2001, the MCM formally merged with Gérald Tremblay's Union des citoyens et des citoyennes de l’Île de Montréal party.

Prescott was re-elected to city council with the new party in 2001 and was immediately appointed deputy chairman of Montreal's executive committee.

== Out of office ==
In the 2009 Montreal municipal election, Prescott was defeated by Nimâ Machouf of Projet Montréal, co-candidate for mayoral candidate Richard Bergeron, who assumed the city council seat. Prescott did not run in the 2013 municipal election.

== Footnotes ==
Political offices
| Preceded by Sidney Stevens | City Councillor, District of Jeanne-Mance; 1982-2009 | Succeeded by Richard Bergeron |
