= François Purcell =

François Purcell is an elected official from Montreal. He was head of the municipal Vision Montréal Party between May 2006 and 2008. He was city councillor of the district of Saint-Édouard, in the arrondissement of Rosemont–La Petite-Patrie, from his entry into municipal politics, in 1998. He has also been president of the elected caucus of Vision Montréal. He has sat on the Commissions for finance, administrative services and human resources for the city of Montreal.

As part of the official opposition of Montreal, he was responsible for finances, strategic planning, fiscal planning, administrative services, the three year building plan, corporate affairs, human resources, and the para-municipal societies.
