= Parti Fierté Montréal =

- Active municipal party
- Leader: Michel Bédard

Parti Fierté Montréal (English: Montreal Pride Party) is a small municipal political party in Montreal, Quebec, Canada. It fronted its own candidate, Michel Bédard for the mayorship of Montreal in the municipal elections in 2009.

During his electoral campaign, Mr. Bédard protested because of his exclusion from an election debate on Société Radio-Canada on equal footing with the candidates of the three major parties Union Montréal, Vision Montréal and Projet Montréal, but his request to join in the debate was rejected. During the actual elections, he brought in just 5,297 votes, 1.26% of the electorate.

Presently the Parti Fierté Montréal has no councillors in Montreal's city government.
