= 2017 Canadian honours =

Canadian government recognitions

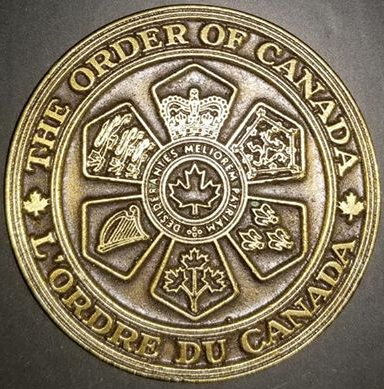
The Seal of the Order of Canada

The following are the appointments to various Canadian Honours of 2017. Usually, they are announced as part of the New Year and Canada Day celebrations and are published within the Canada Gazette during year. This follows the custom set out within the United Kingdom which publishes its appoints of various British Honours for New Year's and for monarch's official birthday. However, instead of the midyear appointments announced on Victoria Day, the official birthday of the Canadian Monarch, this custom has been transferred with the celebration of Canadian Confederation and the creation of the Order of Canada

However, as the Canada Gazette publishes appointment to various orders, decorations and medal, either Canadian or from Commonwealth and foreign states, this article will reference all Canadians so honoured during the 2019 calendar year.

Provincial and Territorial Honours are not listed within the Canada Gazette, however they are listed within the various publications of each provincial government. Provincial and territorial honours are listed within the page.

== The Order of Canada ==
=== Extraordinary Companion of the Order of Canada ===
- His Royal Highness The Prince Charles, Prince of Wales, P.C., K.G., K.T., G.C.B., O.M., A.K., Q.S.O., C.C., S.O.M., C.D., A.D.C.

=== Companions of the Order of Canada ===
Undress ribbon of a Companion of the Order of Canada

- Peter A. Herrndorf, C.C., O.Ont.
- The Honourable Marshall Rothstein, C.C.

=== Officers of the Order of Canada ===
Undress ribbon of an Officer of the Order of Canada

- Joseph Arvay, O.C.
- Yoshua Bengio, O.C.
- Darleen Bogart, O.C.
- Abdallah S. Daar, O.C.
- Denis Daneman, O.C.
- Mary Anne Eberts, O.C.
- Richard Brian Marcel Fadden, O.C.
- Chad Gaffield, O.C.
- Sylvia Maracle, O.C.
- Mark Messier, O.C.
- Michael John Myers, O.C.
- Catherine O'Hara, O.C.
- William Siebens, O.C.
- Christine Margaret Sinclair, O.C.
- Michèle Stanton-Jean, O.C., O.Q.
- Alex Trebek, O.C.
- Hieu Cong Truong, O.C.
- Jean-Marc Vallée, O.C.
- Gloria Cranmer Webster, O.C.
- The Honourable Wayne G. Wouters, P.C., O.C.

=== Members of the Order of Canada ===
Undress ribbon for a Member of the Order of Canada

- Paul Albrechtsen, C.M., O.M.
- Bobby Baker, C.M.
- Judith G. Bartlett, C.M.
- Rod Beattie, C.M.
- Ross J. Beaty, C.M.
- René-Luc Blaquière, C.M.
- René Blouin, C.M.
- Louise Boisvert, C.M.
- Denis Boivin, C.M.
- Edwin Robert Bourget, C.M.
- Pierre Bourgie, C.M., O.Q.
- Dionne Brand, C.M.
- Geoffrey Cape, C.M.
- Chantal Caron, C.M.
- Graydon Carter, C.M.
- Meredith Chilton, C.M.
- Joyce Churchill, C.M.
- Susan Coyne, C.M.
- Susan Elizabeth Crocker, C.M.
- Cathy Crowe, C.M.
- Tracy Dahl, C.M.
- Michel Dallaire, C.M., C.Q.
- Peter B. Dent, C.M.
- Gord Downie, C.M.
- Alan Doyle, C.M.
- Nady A. el-Guebaly, C.M.
- Johnny Fay, C.M.
- The Honourable Liza Frulla, P.C., C.M., O.Q.
- Brian F. Gable, C.M.
- Lise Gaboury-Diallo, C.M.
- Emmanuelle Gattuso, C.M.
- Douglas Maitland Gibson, C.M.
- François Godbout, C.M.
- Rick Green, C.M., O.Ont.
- Salvatore Guerrera, C.M.
- Ellen Hamilton, C.M.
- Robert Keith Harman, C.M.
- Sibylla Hesse, C.M.
- Christopher House, C.M.
- Mi'sel Joe, C.M.
- Roxanne Joyal, C.M.
- Daniel Kandelman, C.M.
- Margo Kane, C.M.
- Gregory S. Kealey, C.M.
- François Mario Labbé, C.M., C.Q.
- Paul Langlois, C.M.
- Daniel Roland Lanois, C.M.
- Catherine Latimer, C.M.
- Sylvia L'Ecuyer, C.M.
- Garry M. Lindberg, C.M.
- John Macfarlane, C.M.
- Pierre Maisonneuve, C.M.
- Félix Maltais, C.M.
- Patricia Mandy, C.M.
- Michael Massie, C.M.
- Peter Gould McAuslan, C.M.
- Kim McConnell, C.M.
- Marguerite Mendell, C.M., O.Q.
- Paul Mills, C.M.
- Saeed Mirza, C.M.
- Anita Molzahn, C.M.
- George Myhal, C.M.
- Élise Paré-Tousignant, C.M., O.Q.
- Chief Terrance Paul, C.M.
- Benoît Pelletier, C.M., O.Q.
- Jean Perrault, C.M., C.Q.
- André Perry, C.M.
- Jane Ash Poitras, C.M.
- Diane Proulx-Guerrera, C.M.
- Gail Erlick Robinson, C.M., O.Ont.
- Judy Rogers, C.M.
- Jacqueline Fanchette Clay Shumiatcher, C.M., S.O.M.
- John H. Sims, C.M.
- Gord Sinclair, C.M.
- Gordon J. Smith, C.M.
- William Earl Stafford, C.M.
- Bryan W. Tisdall, C.M.
- William A. Waiser, C.M., S.O.M.
- Lorne Waldman, C.M.
- Sharon Lynn Walmsley, C.M.
- Meeka Walsh, C.M.
- Bert Wasmund, C.M.
- William Price Wilder, C.M.

== Order of Military Merit ==
=== Termination of appointments of the Order of Military Merit ===
- Warrant Officer Richard Fancy, C.D (Retired) -

=== Commanders of the Order of Military Merit ===
Undress ribbon for a Commander of the Order of Military Merit

- Rear-Admiral Scott Edward George Bishop, C.M.M., C.D. - This is a promotion within the Order
- Major-General Christopher John Coates, C.M.M., M.S.M., C.D. - This is a promotion within the Order
- Rear-Admiral Joseph Gilles Pierre Couturier, C.M.M., C.D. - This is a promotion within the Order
- Major-General Charles Adrien Lamarre, C.M.M., M.S.C., C.D. - This is a promotion within the Order
- Major-General Denis William Thompson, C.M.M., M.S.C., C.D. - This is a promotion within the Order

=== Officers of the Order of Military Merit ===
Undress ribbon for an Officer of the Order of Military Merit

- Major Marie Josée Brigitte Allaire, O.M.M., C.D.
- Brigadier-General Frances Jennifer Allen, O.M.M., C.D.
- Lieutenant-Colonel Holly Abigail Bernita Apostoliuk, O.M.M., C.D.
- Lieutenant-Colonel Bryan Philip Baker, O.M.M., C.D.
- Lieutenant-Colonel Joseph François Martin Barrette, O.M.M., C.D.
- Colonel Jean André Simon Bernard, O.M.M., C.D.
- Colonel Sébastien Bouchard, O.M.M., M.S.M., C.D.
- Lieutenant-Colonel Jeannot Emanuel Boucher, O.M.M., M.S.M., C.D.
- Brigadier-General Trevor John Cadieu, O.M.M., M.S.M., C.D.
- Brigadier-General James Frederick Camsell, O.M.M., M.S.M., C.D.
- Captain(N) James Allan Clarke, O.M.M., C.D.
- Lieutenant-Colonel Joseph Jean Marc Délisle, O.M.M., C.D.
- Commodore Haydn Clyde Edmundson, O.M.M., M.S.M., C.D.
- Colonel Joseph Marc Gagné, O.M.M., M.S.M., C.D.
- Lieutenant-Colonel Michael Kaiser, O.M.M., M.S.M., C.D.
- Captain(N) Josée Kurtz, O.M.M., C.D.
- Lieutenant-Colonel Shawn Blair Luckhurst, O.M.M., C.D
- Lieutenant-Colonel Thomas Joseph McNeil, O.M.M., C.D.
- Colonel Steven Masaaki Moritsugu, O.M.M., C.D.
- Captain(N) Ronald Gerald Pumphrey, O.M.M., M.S.M., C.D.
- Lieutenant-Colonel Liam Wade Rutland, O.M.M., M.S.M., C.D.

=== Members of the Order of Military Merit ===
Undress ribbon for a Member of the Order of Military Merit

- Petty Officer 1st Class Gordon James Abthorpe, M.M.M., C.D.
- Chief Warrant Officer Joseph Marcel Ghislain Angel, M.M.M., C.D.
- Chief Warrant Officer Wayne John Bantock, M.M.M., C.D.
- Sergeant Adam De Bartok, M.M.M., C.D.
- Captain Michael Joseph Charles Bastien, M.M.M., C.D.
- Warrant Officer Kevin Grant Beattie, M.M.M., C.D.
- Chief Warrant Officer Necole Elizabeth Belanger, M.M.M., C.D.
- Warrant Officer Vickie Lucie Benoit, M.M.M., C.D.
- Petty Officer 1st Class Yves Leonide Bernard, M.M.M., C.D.
- Lieutenant-Commander Jeffrey Biddiscombe, M.M.M., C.D.
- Lieutenant(N) Randall Milton Binnie, M.M.M., C.D.
- Master Warrant Officer Richard Joseph Rosaire Martin Bonenfant, M.M.M., C.D.
- Chief Warrant Officer John Andrew Andres Bonvie, M.M.M., M.S.M., C.D.
- Chief Warrant Officer Albert Boucher, M.M.M., C.D.
- Warrant Officer Marc Joseph Luc Boucher, M.M.M., C.D.
- Warrant Officer Marcel Yan Boursier, M.M.M., C.D.
- Sergeant Steven Leo Boyd, M.M.M., C.D.
- Warrant Officer Shaun Gary Burdeyny, M.M.M., M.S.M., C.D.
- Chief Petty Officer 2nd Class Martin David Cashin, M.M.M., C.D.
- Chief Warrant Officer Kevin Denis Colcy, M.M.M., C.D.
- Warrant Officer Joseph Émile Armand Denis Cournoyer, M.M.M., C.D.
- Chief Warrant Officer Michael Allan Davis, M.M.M., C.D.
- Warrant Officer Marie Hélène Manon Desharnais, M.M.M., C.D.
- Chief Warrant Officer David Ellyatt, M.M.M., C.D.
- Chief Warrant Officer Luc Emond, M.M.M., M.S.M., C.D.
- Master Warrant Officer Duane Wilfred Feltham, M.M.M., C.D.
- Captain Gregory Charles Forsyth, M.M.M., C.D.
- Chief Warrant Officer Paul Michael Francis, M.M.M., C.D.
- Chief Warrant Officer William Perry Fudge, M.M.M., C.D.
- Warrant Officer Omere Jules Gagne, M.M.M., C.D.
- Master Warrant Officer Vincent Ronald Gagnon, M.M.M., C.D.
- Sergeant Kim Marie Marguerite Gélinas, M.M.M., C.D.
- Master Warrant Officer Mathieu Giard, M.M.M., C.D.
- Captain Robert Bruce Grant, M.M.M., C.D.
- Master Warrant Officer Raymond Jay Green, M.M.M., C.D.
- Chief Warrant Officer Michael Charles Hamilton, M.M.M., C.D.
- Master Warrant Officer John Arthur Thomas Heffernan, M.M.M., C.D.
- Master Warrant Officer Terry Thomas Jones, M.M.M., C.D.
- Chief Warrant Officer Gabor Joseph Kato, M.M.M., C.D.
- Petty Officer 1st Class Sean Edward Roy Kelly, M.M.M., C.D.
- Petty Officer 2nd Class Jezella Kleininger, M.M.M., C.D.
- Master Warrant Officer Joseph Guy Benoit Laliberté, M.M.M., C.D.
- Captain Stephane Joseph Claude Laplante, M.M.M., C.D.
- Petty Officer 2nd Class Nicholas John Arthur LePage, M.M.M., C.D.
- Master Warrant Officer William Jack Lovely, M.M.M., C.D.
- Master Warrant Officer James MacKenzie, M.M.M., C.D.
- Chief Warrant Officer Joseph André Serge Marcotte, M.M.M., C.D.
- Chief Petty Officer 1st Class Daniel Mercier, M.M.M., C.D.
- Major Marc-André Meunier, M.M.M., C.D.
- Warrant Officer Stephen Richard Miller, M.M.M., C.D.
- Master Warrant Officer Michael Morrison, M.M.M., C.D.
- Chief Petty Officer 1st Class David Jordan Wilfred Morse, M.M.M., C.D.
- Chief Warrant Officer Jeffrey Wayne Munn, M.M.M., C.D.
- Chief Warrant Officer Joseph Paul Rémi Nault, M.M.M., C.D.
- Warrant Officer John Bernard O'Neill, M.M.M., C.D.
- Petty Officer 1st Class Scott James Osborne, M.M.M., C.D.
- Warrant Officer Guillaume Page, M.M.M., C.D.
- Ranger Levi Palituq, M.M.M., M.B., C.D.
- Chief Warrant Officer Shawn Leonard Patterson, M.M.M., C.D.
- Master Warrant Officer Brett Robert Perry, M.M.M., C.D.
- Master Warrant Officer Mark Dennis Riach, M.M.M., C.D.
- Chief Warrant Officer Stephen Arthur Rice, M.M.M., C.D.
- Warrant Officer Teresa Marie Rodden-Aubut, M.M.M., C.D.
- Sergeant Monique Ryan, M.M.M., C.D.
- Warrant Officer Karen Saunders, M.M.M., C.D.
- Chief Petty Officer 1st Class Brian Charles Schwenker, M.M.M., C.D.
- Major James Edwin Short, M.M.M., C.D.
- Chief Warrant Officer George Wayne Snider, M.M.M., C.D.
- Petty Officer 1st Class Jaime Elizabeth Stohl, M.M.M., C.D.
- Master Warrant Officer Glen Curtis Taylor, M.M.M., C.D.
- Master Warrant Officer Thomas Scott Thompson, M.M.M., C.D.
- Warrant Officer Pamela Diane Tochor, M.M.M., C.D.
- Warrant Officer Sergio Tomasi, M.M.M., C.D.
- Petty Officer 2nd Class Sarah Marie Valentine, M.M.M., C.D.
- Sergeant Marie VanAlstyne, M.M.M., C.D.
- Chief Warrant Officer Thomas Kenneth Verner, M.M.M., C.D.
- Chief Warrant Officer Joseph André Martin Walhin, M.M.M., C.D.
- Master Warrant Officer Gilbert Stephen Waye, M.M.M., C.D.
- Master Warrant Officer Scott Robbins Wilson, M.M.M., C.D.

== Order of Merit of the Police Forces ==
=== Commander of the Order of Merit of the Police Forces ===
Undress ribbon of a Commander of the Order of Merit of the Police Forces

- Deputy Commissioner Craig Callens, O.O.M. - This is a promotion within the Order

=== Officers of the Order of Merit of the Police Forces ===
Undress ribbon of an Officer of the Order of Merit of the Police Forces

- Assistant Commissioner Joseph Peter Byron Boucher
- Chief Superintendent Scott Doran
- Superintendent Martine M. M. Fontaine
- Assistant Commissioner James Richard Douglas Gresham, M.O.M. - This is a promotion within the Order
- Chief Constable David P. Jones, M.O.M - This is a promotion within the Order
- Inspector Thomas Brent McCluskie
- Chief Jeffrey McGuire, M.O.M - This is a promotion within the Order
- Chief Constable Anthony Adam Palmer, M.O.M - This is a promotion within the Order
- Director General Martin Prud'homme
- Constable Athanasios Stamatakis, M.O.M - This is a promotion within the Order
- Chief Superintendent John Sullivan

=== Members of the Order of Merit of the Police Forces ===
Undress ribbon of a Member of the Order of Merit of the Police Forces

- Superintendent Cita Carmen Airth
- Staff Sergeant Jody G. Armstrong
- Superintendent Sean E. Auld
- Superintendent Richard David Baylin
- Sergeant Craig Blanchard
- Sergeant Grant S. Boulay
- Wendy Boyd
- Sergeant Kevin Alan Bracewell
- Director Pierre Brochet
- Superintendent Deanne F. Burleigh
- Staff Sergeant Paul Burnett
- Chief Superintendent John A. Cain
- Inspector Stephen Andrew Clegg
- Superintendent Derek Cooke
- Staff Sergeant Audrey Costello
- Chief Superintendent Marie Shirley Ann Cuillierrier
- Chief Superintendent Stephan J. M. Drolet
- Superintendent John Gordon Duff
- Angela Wyatt Eke
- Superintendent James Richard Faulkner
- Sergeant Robert S. Fnukal
- Staff Sergeant Robert James Fournier
- Deputy Chief Constable David Scott Green
- Chief Superintendent Christopher W. Harkins
- Staff Sergeant Penny I. Hart
- Superintendent Alison Jevons
- Sergeant Travis Erich Juska
- Corporal Brian Kerr
- Deputy Chief Officer Barry Richard Kross
- Superintendent Gary J. W. Leydier
- Superintendent Ward Clay Lymburner
- Superintendent Sean Joseph Maloney
- Staff Sergeant John Martone
- Superintendent Douglas Maynard
- Corporal Ryan Roy Mitchell
- Beverly A. Mullins
- Superintendent Dale Mumby
- Chief Superintendent Bernard L. Murphy
- Chief W. Geoffrey Nelson
- Inspector Ralph Detlev Pauw
- Chief Marlo Dean Pritchard
- Deputy Chief Constable Laurence John Rankin
- Sergeant David S. Rektor
- Superintendent Raymond Robitaille
- Staff Sergeant Maureen Rudall
- Inspector Paul Gerard Saganski
- James Scott Saunders
- Superintendent Michel Joseph Lucien Denis Saurette
- Superintendent Gary Michael Shinkaruk
- Deputy Chief Jill Mary Skinner
- Chief Superintendent Eric Ivan Stubbs
- Sergeant William Spargo Wallace
- Inspector Cindy Joyce White
- Inspector Magdi Younan

== Most Venerable Order of the Hospital of St. John of Jerusalem ==
Undress ribbon for all grades of the Most Venerable Order of the Hospital of St. John of Jerusalem

=== Knights and Dames of the Order of St. John ===
- His Honour the Honourable J. Michel Doyon, Q.C. Québec, Que.
- Roy Howard James Large, Duncan, B.C.
- Jim Yuan Lai, Markham, Ont.

=== Commanders of the Order of St. John ===
- Frederica Eleonore Margarethe Gibson, Mission, B.C.
- Raymond Tze Hung Woo, Richmond Hill, Ont.
- Armand Paul LaBarge, Bethany, Ont.
- John Edgar Nadeau, Whistler, B.C.
- Joseph Bruce Varner, Ottawa, Ont.

=== Officers of the Order of St. John ===
- Jean-Pierre François Joseph Dorey, Leamington, Ont.
- Mary Elaine Heinicke, Winnipeg, Man.
- Corporal Michael James Hill, Niagara Falls, Ont.
- Edward David Hodgins, Victoria, B.C.
- Colonel Steven Craig McQuitty, Ottawa, Ont.
- Gordon James Keir Neill, Q.C., Regina, Sask.
- Adam Jack Prieur, Hamilton, Ont.
- Grant Richard Scollay, Brampton, Ont.
- Jonathan Richard Wallace, North Saanich, B.C.
- Lawrence Denis Wong, C.D., Saskatoon, Sask.
- Jason Andrew Grass, Oshawa, Ont.
- Ross Nicholls, Victoria, B.C.
- Ryan William Smith, Orton, Ont.
- Andrew Preston Wilder, M.O.M., Owen Sound, Ont.

=== Members of the Order of St. John ===
- Maureen Shirley Batchelor, Mississauga, Ont.
- Captain Jeremiah Earl Bell, Kitchener, Ont.
- Trudie Marlene Bonbernard, Kamloops, B.C.
- Captain John David Broughton, C.D., Kelowna, B.C.
- Glenn Stephen Brown, Brantford, Ont.
- Leslie Elizabeth Bullock, Markham, Ont.
- Shaun Michael Buote, Edmonton, Alta.
- Jillean Ruth Cairns, Regina, Sask.
- Kathy Calvin, White City, Sask.
- Shane Camelford, Guelph, Ont.
- Sandra Lee Cascadden, Hatchel Lake, N.S.
- Karen Cheung, Edmonton, Alta.
- Annette Deagle, Timberlea, N.S.
- Colleen Anne Dell, Corman Park, Sask.
- Brandon Fang, Mississauga, Ont.
- Sidney René Peter Gaudry, Regina, Sask.
- Daniel Gordon Kenneth Gee, Lower Truro, N.S.
- Annette Sylvia Geldbert, Mississauga, Ont.
- Nancy Haywood, Welland, Ont.
- Karen Katherine Herzog, Edmonton, Alta.
- Tyrone Christopher Hilton, Toronto, Ont.
- Warrant Officer Jeffrey Allan Hopping, New Lowell, Ont.
- Kimberley Earlette ImBoden, Oshawa, Ont.
- Adam Janikowski, Calgary, Alta.
- Stéphane Lambert, Longueuil, Que.
- Amanda Layton-Malone, Hatchet Lake, N.S.
- Benjamin Leung, Vancouver, B.C.
- Janet Mary McGregor, Surrey, B.C.
- P. Edward Meijer, Thunder Bay, Ont.
- Mark Leslie Newman, Niagara Falls, Ont.
- Jeffrey Wai Keong Ng, Woodbridge, Ont.
- Sehar Nurpuri, Winnipeg, Man.
- Stephanie Dawn Peachey, Saskatoon, Sask.
- Serge Pellerin, Laval, Que.
- Teresa Lynn Power, Komoka, Ont.
- Margaret Mary Rose Régimbald, Edmonton, Alta.
- Jeanette Reynolds, Musquodoboit Harbour, N.S.
- Melissa Bernadette Marie Steppler, Regina, Sask.
- Mark Steven Wilkerson, Vernon, B.C.
- Bonnie Wood, Surrey, B.C.
- Frederick Yim, Vancouver, B.C.
- Romano Oseo Acconci, C.D., Burnaby, B.C.
- Tara Herd, Fergus, Ont.
- Major Christopher Matthew Hollett, C.D., Bays Bull, N.L.
- Bridget E. Jensen, Kamloops, B.C.
- Ken Ka-Him Luk, Thornhill, Ont.
- Donald Walter Maclean, Halifax, N.S.
- Jessica Elysse Marciniak, Guelph, Ont.
- William Duncan McNiece, Kamloops, B.C.
- David George Norris, St. John's, N.L.
- Jack Andrew MacPherson Peters, Winnipeg, Man.
- Lynn Diane Potts, Beeton, Ont.
- Lieutenant-Colonel (Retired) William Andrew Sergeant, O.M.M., C.D., Barrie, Ont.
- Kevin James Stinson, Guelph, Ont.
- Keith Trainor, Kamloops, B.C.
- Martin Urbanowski, Vancouver, B.C.
- Shirley Violet Edna Wellbourn, Kamloops, B.C.
- Jedd Wood, Halifax, N.S.

== Provincial Honours ==
=== National Order of Québec ===
==== Grand Officers of the National Order of Québec ====
Undress ribbon for a Grand Officer of the National Order of Québec

- L. Jacques Ménard, G.O.Q. - This is a promotion within the Order
- Hubert Reeves, G.O.Q. - This is a promotion within the Order

==== Officers of the National Order of Québec ====
Undress ribbon for an Officer of the National Order of Québec

- Daniel Bertolino, O.Q.
- Gilles Brassard, O.Q.
- The Honourable Irwin Cotler, P.C., O.C., O.Q.
- Francine de Montigny, O.Q.
- Michèle Fortin, O.Q.
- Jacques Montplaisir, O.Q.
- Louise Penny, O.Q.
- John R. Porter, O.Q. - This is a promotion within the Order
- Claude Robinson, O.Q.
- Florian Sauvageau, O.Q.
- Luc Vinet, O.Q.

===== Honorary Officers of the National Order of Québec =====
- Joseph V. Melillo, O.Q.
- Peter Klaus, O.Q.
- Moshe Safdie, O.Q.
- Irina Bokova, O.Q.

==== Knights of the National Order of Québec ====
Undress ribbon for a Knight of the National Order of Québec

- Nahid Aboumansour, C.Q.
- Pierre Boivin, C.Q.
- Alain Chartrand, C.Q.
- Yolande Cohen, C.Q.
- Lise Cormier, C.Q.
- René Dallaire, C.Q.
- Michel de la Chenelière, C.Q.
- Paul-Arthur Fortin, C.Q.
- Serge Gauthier, C.Q.
- Jacques Girard, C.Q.
- Jacques Godin, C.Q.
- Madeleine Juneau, C.Q.
- Maria Labrecque Duchesneau, C.Q.
- Ricardo Larrivée, C.Q.
- Louise Nadeau, C.Q.
- Zebedee Nungak, C.Q.
- Jeannot Painchaud, C.Q.
- Serge Payette, C.Q.
- Carol L. Richards, C.Q.
- Jean-René Roy, C.Q.

===== Honorary Knights of the National Order of Québec =====
- The Honourable Peter Shumlin, C.Q.
- Gad Elmaleh, C.Q.

=== Saskatchewan Order of Merit ===
Undress ribbon for a member of the Saskatchewan Order of Merit

- Murad Al-Katib, S.O.M.
- June Avivi, S.O.M.
- Martha Cole, S.O.M.
- Roland Crowe, S.O.M.
- Rod Gantefoer, S.O.M.
- Paul J. Hill, C.M., S.O.M.
- Robert D. Laing, S.O.M., Q.C.
- Dr. Roberta McKay, S.O.M.
- Robert Mitchell, S.O.M., Q.C. (1936-2016) (posthumous)
- Brigadier General (Ret'd) Clifford Walker, S.O.M., C.D.

=== Order of Ontario ===
Undress ribbon for a member of the Order of Ontario

- Dr. Upton Allen – pediatric infectious disease specialist
- Daniel Aykroyd – actor and entrepreneur
- Dr. Alan Bernstein – cancer researcher and research leader
- Dr. David Cechetto – neuroscientist and director of international medical development projects
- Dr. Peter Chang – lawyer and psychiatrist
- The Honourable Sandra Chapnik – lawyer and judge
- Dr. Tom Chau – biomedical engineer
- Dr. Dorothy Cotton – psychologist and mental health advocate
- Peter Dinsdale – Anishinaabe community leader
- Leslie Fagan – singer and promoter of Canadian music
- Michael Geist – scholar and public intellectual
- Shashi Kant – professor of forest resource economics
- Myrtha Lapierre – retired nursing professor
- Floyd Laughren – former MPP and Finance Minister
- Michael Lee-Chin – entrepreneur and philanthropist
- Gail Nyberg – former Daily Bread Food Bank executive director and former school trustee
- Dr. Dilkhush Panjwani – psychiatrist
- Elder Geraldine Robertson – educator and advocate for residential school survivors
- Allan Rock – former politician and UN Ambassador
- Robert J. Sawyer – celebrated science-fiction author
- Sandra Shamas – writer, performer and comedian
- Elizabeth Sheehy – criminal law, scholar
- Ilse Treurnicht – CEO and advocate for women and innovation

=== Order of British Columbia ===
Undress ribbon for a member of the Order of British Columbia

- Tim Manning
- Paul Myers
- Neil J. Sterritt
- Wally Oppal
- Dr. Stanley W. Hamilton
- James Byrnes
- Sarah Morgan-Silvester
- Dr. Roslyn Kunin
- Dr. Roslyn Louise Harrison
- Elaine Carty
- Wendy Morton
- Jennifer Wade
- Joseph James Arvay
- Dr. Gary Birch
- Lance S.G. Finch
- Dr. Jiri Frohlich

=== Alberta Order of Excellence ===
Undress ribbon for a member of the Alberta Order of Excellence

- Steve Allan
- Gary Bowie
- Anne Fanning Binder
- Marie Gordon
- James Holland
- Steve Hrudey
- Vivian Manasc
- David Werklund

=== Order of Prince Edward Island ===
Undress ribbon for a member of the Order of Prince Edward Island

=== Order of Manitoba ===
Undress ribbon for a member of the Order of Manitoba

- David Angus
- Marlene Bertrand
- Doreen Brownstone
- Selwyn Burrows
- Philipp R. Ens
- Anne Lindsey
- Lisa Meeches
- The Honourable Reynaldo Pagtakhan
- Phillip Peebles
- Robert Picken
- Paul Robson
- Beverly Suek

=== Order of New Brunswick ===
Undress ribbon for a member of the Order of New Brunswick

- Normand Caissie
- Susan Chalmers-Gauvin
- Erminie J. Cohen, C.M.
- Richard J. Currie, O.C.
- Raimo (Ray) Kokkonen, C.D.
- Donat Lacroix
- Dr. Michael Perley
- Léopold Thériault
- Jacqueline Webster

=== Order of Nova Scotia ===
Undress ribbon for a member of the Order of Nova Scotia

- Bradford J. Barton, C.M., O.N.S.
- Geraldine Marjorie Browning, O.N.S., DHum (Hon.)
- R. Irene d'Entremont, C.M., O.N.S., D.Comm. (Hon.)
- Ray Ivany, O.N.S., M.S., D.Law (Hon.)
- Peter J. M. Nicholson, C.M., O.N.S., PhD.

=== Order of Newfoundland and Labrador ===
Undress ribbon for a member of the Order of Newfoundland and Labrador

- Marie Ryan
- Terence Goodyear
- Kathleen Pratt LeGrow
- Frederick David Smallwood
- Robert Mellin
- Wayne Miller
- Dr. Falah Maroun
- Katarina Roxon

== Territorial Honours ==
=== Order of Nunavut ===
Undress ribbon for a member of the Order of Nunavut

- Betty Brewster
- Ludy Pudluk

=== Order of the Northwest Territories ===
Undress ribbon for a member of the Order of Northwest Territories

- Paul Andrew
- Fred Carmichael
- Russell King
- Linda Koe
- Jeff Philipp
- Tom Zubko

== Canadian Bravery Decorations ==
=== Star of Courage ===
Undress ribbon for the Star of Courage

- John W. Gallie (deceased)
- Liam Bernard, S.C.
- Sebastian Taborszky, S.C.

=== Medal of Bravery ===
Undress ribbon for the Medal of Bravery

- Ronald James Andersen
- Petty Officer First Class André Aubry, C.D.
- Hichem Ayoub
- Juergen Baetzel
- Constable Craig Barker
- Jean-François Bouchard
- Constable Robert Conant
- Constable Steve Demers
- Corporal Alisha Dawn Fisher
- Special Constable Joshua Ford
- Barry Gateman
- Helen Anne Goulet
- Daniel Patrick Greene
- Brant Hannah
- John Fawcett Vernon Hewitt
- Paul Hindson
- Constable Paul Hykaway
- Arliss Jackson
- Tobias MacDonald
- Daniel Maisonneuve
- Constable Michael McGee
- Stéphane Ouellette
- Constable Samuel Poirier-Payette
- Constable Blake Pyatt
- Stuart Rostant
- Marc Savoie
- Gregory Swan
- James Sylvest
- Adam James Tarnowski
- Sylvain Tremblay
- Carol Van Ruymbeke
- Dale Gary Woloshyn
- Samson Aboegbulem, M.B.
- John Allison, M.B.
- Samir Al-Rubaiy, M.B.
- Abdul Ayoola, M.B.
- James Badgley, M.B.
- Constable Daniel Bassi, M.B.
- Sergeant Stephen Claude Joseph Bates, M.B., C.D.
- Steeve Bordeleau, M.B.
- Constable Jacob Braun, M.B.
- Sergeant Stéphane Champagne, M.B.
- Anne Michelle Curtis, M.B. (posthumous)
- Lieutenant (N) Samuel Gaudreault, M.B., C.D.
- John Gorman, M.B.
- Dean Ingram, M.B.
- Constable Zoran Ivkovic, M.B.
- Private Matthew Thomas Lepain, M.B.
- Darren Life, M.B.
- Leading Seaman Jean-François Martineau, M.B.
- Jim Mascioli, M.B.
- John McDonald, M.B.
- Russell Montell, M.B.
- Constable Stephanie Pelley, M.B.
- Able Seaman James Richards, M.B.
- Constable Neal Ridley, M.B.
- Constable Allan Rivet, M.B.
- Sergeant Jean-Marc Rochon, M.B.
- Daniel Roy, M.B.
- Leon Slaney, M.B.
- Don Smith, M.B.
- Calvin Stein, M.B.
- Robert Stokes, M.B.
- Vince Teddy, M.B.
- Constable Charlie Torres, M.B.
- Constable Andrew Vickers, M.B.
- Lieutenant (N) Daniel Willis, M.B.
- Corporal Alexander Edward Zawyrucha, M.B.
- Master Corporal Bryan Gagne, M.B., C.D.

== Meritorious Service Decorations ==
=== Meritorious Service Cross (Military Division) ===
Undress ribbon for Meritious Service Cross in the military division

- Colonel Joseph Raoul Stéphane Boivin, M.S.C., C.D.
- Colonel David Elder, M.S.C., A.M.

=== Meritorious Service Cross (Civil Division) ===
Undress ribbon for Meritious Service Cross in the civilian division

- Daniel Alfredsson, M.S.C.
- Alethea Arnaquq-Baril, M.S.C.
- Robert Edward Burrell, M.S.C.
- Jennifer Coghlan, M.S.C.
- Nicholas Iain Coghlan, M.S.C.
- Teresa Barbara Dellar, M.S.C.
- Jessica DiSabatino, M.S.C.
- Robert David Ellis, M.S.C.
- Heinrich Ulrich Feldmann, M.S.C.
- Peter Michael Ford, M.S.C.
- Judy L. Graves, M.S.C.
- Michael Kaufman, M.S.C.
- Gary P. Kobinger, O.M., M.S.C.
- The Honourable Jack Layton, P.C., M.S.C. (posthumous)
- Ting Yim Lee, M.S.C.
- Monique Lefebvre, M.S.C.
- Joseph Maloney, M.S.C.
- Norman J. Rolston, O.B.C., M.S.C., C.D.
- Nicole Rycroft, M.S.C.
- Ronald Sluser, M.S.C.
- Mark Vincent Wafer, M.S.C.
- Ron Abrahams, M.S.C.
- John Allan Baker, M.S.C.
- A. Lynne Beal, M.S.C.
- Dan Bigras, M.S.C.
- Pierre Bouvier, M.S.C.
- Tom Chau, M.S.C.
- Sandra Elizabeth Clarke, M.S.C.
- Charles-André Comeau, M.S.C.
- Michel Côté, M.S.C.
- David Desrosiers, M.S.C.
- Pierre Duez, M.S.C.
- Christine J. Elliott, M.S.C.
- The Honourable James M. Flaherty, P.C., M.S.C. (posthumous)
- Marcel Gauthier, M.S.C.
- Aileen Gleason, M.S.C.
- Sandra Lynn Hanington, M.S.C.
- Daniel Y. C. Heng, M.S.C.
- Peg Herbert, M.S.C.
- Madeleine Juneau, M.S.C.
- Andrea Lorraine Lamont, M.S.C.
- Sébastien Lefebvre, M.S.C.
- J. Wilton Littlechild, C.M., A.O.E., M.S.C., Q.C.
- Justin Maloney, M.S.C.
- Martin Matte, M.S.C.
- Marc Messier, M.S.C.
- Céline Muloin, M.S.C.
- Jocelyn Paiement, M.S.C.
- Michael Paterson, M.S.C.
- Sarah Payne, M.S.C.
- Luke Glen Richardson, M.S.C.
- Stephanie Ann Richardson, M.S.C.
- The Honourable Murray Sinclair, M.S.C.
- Andrew Stawicki, M.S.C.
- Jean-François Stinco, M.S.C.
- Jean Teillet, M.S.C.
- Stanley Vollant, C.Q., M.S.C.
- Eric Wan, M.S.C.
- Marie Wilson, C.M., M.S.C.
- Eric Charles Windeler, M.S.C.

=== Second award of the Meritorious Service Medal (Military Division) ===
- Colonel James Andrew Irvine, M.S.M., C.D.
- Colonel Gregory Ronald Smith, M.S.M., C.D.

=== Meritorious Service Medal (Military Division) ===
Undress ribbon for the Meritious Service Medal in the military division

- Major Joseph Michel Paul d'Orsonnens, M.S.M., C.D.
- Captain Jessica Harmon, M.S.M. (United States Army)
- Major Paul Douglas Hurley, M.S.M., C.D.
- Honorary Colonel John Keillor Farrer Irving, M.S.M.
- Major Wayne Christopher John Lindsay, M.S.M., C.D.
- Brigadier-General Derek Alan Macaulay, O.M.M., M.S.M., C.D.
- Chief Petty Officer 1st Class Andrew John Tiffin, M.M.M., M.S.M., C.D.
- Major Declan Ward, M.S.M., C.D.
- Colonel John James Alexander, M.S.M., C.D.
- Lieutenant-Colonel Tim Arsenault, M.S.M., C.D.
- Commander Pascal Belhumeur, M.S.M., C.D.
- Colonel Nicolas Pilon, M.S.M., C.D.
- Captain Darcy Dean Cyr, M.S.M., C.D.
- Lieutenant-General Roy Raymond Crabbe, C.M.M., M.S.C., M.S.M., C.D.
- Lieutenant-General Frederick Stanley Rudesheim, M.S.M. (United States Army)
- Captain(N) Frank Michael Knippel, M.S.M., C.D.
- Colonel Jesse Pearson, M.S.M. (United States Army)
- Commander Jason Scott Armstrong, M.S.M., C.D.
- Commander Trevor John Christopher MacLean, M.S.M., C.D.
- Chief Warrant Officer Emmett Gary Kelly, M.S.M., C.D.
- Master Corporal John Chaisson, M.S.M.
- Warrant Officer Michel Beliveau, M.S.M., C.D.
- Sergeant Jordan Kekoa Bourne, M.S.M., C.D.
- Brigadier-General François Joseph Chagnon, O.M.M., M.S.M., C.D.
- Master Seaman Kevin Hervé MacDonald, M.S.M.
- Colonel Joseph Robert François Malo, M.S.M., C.D.
- Brigadier-General Chad Thomas Manske, M.S.M. (United States Air Forces)
- Corporal Adam Savory, M.S.M.
- Sergeant Nicolaas Soulis, M.S.M., C.D.
- Lieutenant-Colonel Tammy Tremblay, M.S.M., C.D.

=== Meritorious Service Medal (Civil Division) ===
Undress ribbon for Meritious Service Medal in the civilian division

- Patricia S. Adachi, M.S.M.
- Christopher Joseph Alfano, M.S.M.
- Miles Leland Anderson, M.S.M.
- Sherilee Ann Anderson, M.S.M.
- Julian Armstrong, M.S.M.
- Gary Bailie, M.S.M.
- Nathalie Beaudry, M.S.M.
- Sharon L. Bieber, M.S.M.
- William F. Bieber, M.S.M.
- Stanley M. Diamond, M.S.M.
- Ruby Dunstan, M.S.M.
- Tina Fedeski, M.S.M.
- Paul E. Finkelstein, M.S.M.
- J. Barbara Finley, M.S.M.
- Georgette A. Fry, M.S.M.
- Andrew John Furey, M.S.M.
- Hy Goldman, M.S.M.
- Sandra Goldman, M.S.M.
- Ian Scott Graham, M.S.M.
- Stephen Robert Gregory, M.S.M.
- Les Hagen, M.S.M.
- Claire E. Hopkinson, M.S.M.
- Kenneth Hubbard, M.S.M.
- Hal Johnson, M.S.M.
- Jennifer Judith Jones, O.M., M.S.M.
- Tina Jean Keeper, O.M., M.S.M.
- Brigadier-general Vincent Wayne Kennedy, O.M.M., M.S.M., C.D. (retired)
- John J. Kish, M.S.M. (posthumous)
- Marilyn Y. Kish, M.S.M.
- Inspector Andrew Stefan Koczerzuk, M.S.M. (retired)
- Claudine Labelle, M.S.M.
- Michael Landsberg, M.S.M.
- Francine Laplante, M.S.M.
- Allen Large, M.S.M.
- Violet L. Large, M.S.M. (posthumous)
- Michel Jacques Bernard Le Baron, M.S.M.
- André Léon Lewis, M.S.M.
- Major-general Terrence Liston, M.S.M., C.D., M.B.E. (retired)
- James Paul Martin, M.S.M.
- Joanne McLeod, M.S.M.
- James Robert Michie, M.S.M.
- Jackoline Gail Milne, M.S.M.
- Brenda L. Montani, M.S.M.
- Patrick M. Montani, M.S.M.
- Valerie Lynne Nelson, M.S.M.
- Frances Noronha, O.Ont., M.S.M., M.B.E.
- Sherman Olson, M.S.M. (posthumous)
- Travis A. J. Price, M.S.M.
- James Raffan, M.S.M.
- Bilaal Rajan, M.S.M.
- Mary Margaret Richard, O.M., M.S.M. (posthumous)
- Jasmin Roy, M.S.M.
- Judy Servay, M.S.M.
- David J. Shepherd, M.S.M.
- William Shurniak, M.S.M.
- Narendra Chetram Singh, M.S.M.
- Dave C. Sopha, M.S.M.
- Mary Spencer, M.S.M.
- Gregory C. Van Tighem, M.S.M.
- Bruce R. Vanstone, M.S.M. (posthumous)
- Rebecca Anne Viau, M.S.M.
- Les H. Voakes, M.S.M.
- Michael Charles Ward, M.S.M.
- Captain William Hargen Wilson, O.M.M., A.O.E., M.S.M., C.D., R.C.N.

=== Secret appointments ===
- 11 November 2017: His Excellency the Right Honourable David Johnston, Governor General and Commander-in-Chief of Canada, on the recommendation of the Chief of the Defence Staff, has awarded a Meritorious Service Cross and four Meritorious Service Medals to members of the Canadian Armed Forces for military activities of high standard that have brought great honour to the Canadian Armed Forces and to Canada. For security and operational reasons, the recipients' names and citations have not been released.

== Mentions in Dispatches ==
- Captain Andrew Paterson
- Master Corporal Mathieu Charette
- Master Corporal Sean Davis, C.D.
- Master Corporal Luke Matthew Hall
- Private Alexandre Lampron
- Sergeant David Eudor Leblanc, C.D.
- Private Mykel-Joey Lévesque
- Master Corporal Tyler James Latta
- Sergeant Jeffrey Spence, M.S.M., C.D.
- Major Victor Alexander de Waal, C.D.
- Master Corporal Shane Spencer Wilson, C.D.

== Polar Medal ==
Undress ribbon of the Polar Medal

- Jill Heinerth
- Ann Maje Raider
- Darlene Scurvey

== Commonwealth and Foreign Orders, Decorations and Medal awarded to Canadians ==
=== From Her Majesty The Queen in Right of the United Kingdom ===
==== Officer of the Most Excellent Order of the British Empire ====
Undress ribbon for all grades of çOrder of the British Empire

- Mr. Danny Rimer

==== Member of the Most Excellent Order of the British Empire ====
- Mr. Imran Amed

=== From His Majesty The King of the Belgians ===
==== Commander of the Order of the Crown ====
- Dr. Roseann O'Reilly Runte
- Mr. Ronald Mock

=== From the President of the Republic of Colombia ===
==== "Faith in the Cause" Military Medal of the National Army ====
- Major-General Denis William Thompson

=== From the President of the Federative Republic of Brazil ===
==== Grand Officer of the Order of Aeronautical Merit ====
- Lieutenant-General Michael John Hood

=== From the Queen of Denmark ===
==== Defence Medal for Exceptionally Meritorious Service ====
- Lieutenant-Colonel Brook Bangsboll

=== From the President of Finland ===
==== Knight of the Order of the White Rose, 1st Class ====
- Dr. Kevin R. E. McCormick

==== Commander of the Order of the Lion of Finland ====
- Mr. Stephen Timmons

=== From the President of the French Republic ===
==== Grand Officer of the National Order of the Legion of Honour ====
Undress ribbon for a Grand Officer of the National Order of the Legion of Honour

- Ms. Louise Beaudoin (This is a promotion within the Order)

==== Commander of the National Order of the Legion of Honour ====
- The Honourable Lawrence Cannon, PC
- General Jonathan Holbert Vance, CMM MSC CD

==== Officer of the National Order of the Legion of Honour ====
- Mr. Michel Robitaille

==== Knight of the National Order of the Legion of Honour ====
- Mr. Guy Cormier
- Mr. Bruno Burnichon
- Lieutenant-Colonel Bruce Bolton, O.M.M., C.D.
- Mr. Denis Brière
- Mr. Michel Côté
- Mr. Louis Fortier
- Mr. Jean-Guy Paquet
- Mr. Michel Archambault
- Mr. Jacques Girard

==== Officer of the National Order of Merit ====
- Mr. Gilbert Dekoker
- Lieutenant-General Guy Robert Thibault
- Vice-Admiral Ron Lloyd

==== Knight of the National Order of Merit ====
- Mr. Alain Aubut
- Mr. Edgard Caillier
- Mr. Roger Fontaine
- Ms. Danièle Henkel
- Ms. Mylène Paquette
- Mr. Wajdi Mouawad

==== Officer of the Order of the Academic Palms ====
- Mr. Jacques-Paul Couturier
- Ms. Roseann O'Reilly Runte

==== Knight of the Order of the Academic Palms ====
Undress ribbon for a Knight of the Order of the Academic Palm of the French Republic

- Ms. Ruby Heap
- Ms. Taghrid Abou Hassan
- Mr. Jocelyn Béland
- Ms. Sima Farsandaj
- Mr. Dominic Giroux
- Mr. Donald Ipperciel
- Ms. Nancy Mallet
- Mr. Pierre Riopel
- Mr. Marc Robichaud
- Ms. Suzanne Robichaud
- Mr. Robert Viau
- Mr. Michel Bergeron
- Mr. Gérard Boismenu
- Ms. Jo-Anne Doyon
- Mr. Christophe Guy
- Ms. Céline Marcoux-Hamade
- Mr. Michel Moisan
- Mr. Jean-Pierre Pichette

==== Commander of the Order of Arts and Letters ====
- Ms. Diane Dufresne
- Mr. Robert Charlebois
- Ms. Carole Laure
- Mr. Wajdi Mouawad

==== Officer of the Order of Arts and Letters ====
- Mr. Guy Berthiaume
- Mr. Joseph Rouleau
- Ms. Maidy Teitelbaum
- Ms. Anne Dorval
- Mr. Lewis Furey
- Ms. Ginnette Noiseux
- Mr. Gradimir Pankov
- Ms. Monique Simard

==== Knight of the Order of Arts and Letters ====
- Ms. Dawn Arnold
- Mr. Cameron Bailey
- Mr. Gaston Bellemare
- Ms. Clothilde Cardinal
- Ms. Louise Dery
- Mr. André Gaudreault
- Mr. Stéphan La Roche
- Ms. Suzanne Lebeau
- Mr. Louis Marchesano
- Ms. Monique Savoie
- Mr. Geoffrey Taylor
- Ms. Paulette Thériault
- Ms. Denise Filiatrault
- Mr. Louis Bélanger
- Ms. Isabelle Boulay
- Ms. Evelyne de la Chenelière
- Mr. Yan England
- Ms. Jacqueline Lyanga
- Mr. Ken Scott
- Ms. Ana Serrano
- Ms. Mary Stephen
- Mr. Theodore Ushev
- Ms. Gaëtane Verna

==== Officer of the Order of Maritime Merit ====
Undress ribbon for an Officer of the Order of Maritime Merit

- Mr. Jean d'Amour

==== Overseas Medal with "MALI" clasp ====
- Lieutenant-Colonel Doris Gobeil

==== National Defence Medal, Gold Echelon with bronze star ====
to Lieutenant-Colonel Joseph Doris Gobeil

==== National Defense Medal, Gold Echelon ====
Undress ribbon for the National Defence Medal, Gold Echelon

- Colonel Guy Joseph Maillet
- Colonel Pierre Huet

==== National Defence Medal, Bronze Echelon ====
Undress ribbon for the National Defence Medal, Bronze Echelon

- Lieutenant-Commander Shawn E. Perry
- Colonel George James Petrolekas
- Commander Simon Brochu
- Major Pascale Lucie Marylène Morin

=== From the President of the Republic of Hungary ===
==== Officer's Cross of the Order of Merit of Hungary (Civil Division) ====
- Dr. Peter Simon
- Mr. József Pungur

==== Knight's Cross of the Order of Merit of Hungary (Civil Division) ====
- Ms. Anna Szenthe

==== Golden Cross of the Order of Merit of Hungary (Civil Division) ====
- Ms. Maria Roy

==== Golden Cross of Merit of Hungary (Civil Division) ====
- Ms. Gizella Hebein

==== Silver Cross of Merit of Hungary (Civil Division) ====
- Ms. Csilla Perényi

=== From the President of the Republic of Italy ===
==== Knight of the Order of the Star of Italy ====
- Mr. Lorenzo Bertuzzi

=== From His Majesty The Emperor of Japan ===
==== Order of the Rising Sun, Gold and Silver Star ====
to Mr. Joseph Caron

==== Order of the Rising Sun, Gold Rays with Neck Ribbon ====
Undress ribbon for the Order of the Rising Sun, Gold Rays with Neck Ribbon

- Mr. Arthur Kazumi Miki
- Mr. Mark James Surrette
- Mr. David Boyer Waterhouse

==== Order of the Rising Sun, Gold Rays with Rosette ====
- Ms. Noella Marie Gaudreault

==== Order of the Rising Sun, Gold and Silver Rays ====
- Mr. Wally Ursuliak
- Mr. Tetsuo Yoshida

=== From His Serene Highness The Prince of Monaco ===
==== Knight of the Order of Saint Charles ====
Undress ribbon for a Knight of the Order of Saint Charles

- Mr. Emmanuel Spanoudis

=== From the Secretary General of the North Atlantic Treaty Organization ===
==== NATO Meritorious Service Medal ====
- Lieutenant-Commander Jason Lacoursière
- Commander Mark Edward White

=== From the President of Pakistan ===
==== Medal of Excellence ====
- Mr. Naweed Imam Syed

=== From the President of the Republic of Poland ===
==== Commander's Cross of the Order of Merit of the Republic of Poland ====
- Mr. Henry Lebioda
- The Honourable Lloyd Axworthy, P.C., C.C.
- The Honourable John Baird, P.C.
- Mr. Ted Opitz

==== Knight's Cross of the Order of Merit of the Republic of Poland ====
- Mr. Andrzej Piotr Antoszkiewicz
- Ms. Marian Jaworski

==== Knight's Cross of the Order of Polonia Restituta ====
- Mr. Kazimierz Pater

==== Cross of Freedom and Solidarity ====
- Ms. Maria Utracka
- Mr. Krzysztof Bialo

==== Siberian Exiles Cross ====
- Ms. Maria Bone
- Ms. Helena Kusiak
- Ms. Irene Wallace
- Mr. Stanislaw Wojtecki

==== Long Marital Life Medal ====
Undress ribbon of the Medal for Long Marital Life

- Mrs. Janina Jekosz
- Mr. Stanislaw Jekosz

=== From the President of the Federation of Russia ===
==== Pushkin Medal ====
- Ms. Svetlana Roufanova

=== From the President of the Republic of Senegal ===
==== Commander of the National Order of the Lion ====
- Lieutenant-Colonel Joseph Guy Savard

=== From the President of Ukraine ===
==== Order of Merit, 3rd Class ====
- Mr. Ian Ihnatowycz

==== Ivan Mazepa Cross ====
- Mr. Taras Bahriy
- Mr. David Dutchak
- Mr. John Holuk
- Mrs. Olesia Luciw-Andrijowych
- Mrs. Renata Roman
- Mr. Orest Steciw

==== 25th Anniversary of the Independence of Ukraine Medal ====
- Mr. Eugene Czolij
- Mr. Paul Grod
- Mr. Victor Hetmanczuk
- Ms. Ruslana Wrzesnewskyj

=== From the President of the United States of America ===
==== Officer of the Legion of Merit ====
Undress ribbon of an Officer of the Legion of Merit of the United States

- Brigadier-General David J. Anderson
- Colonel Jean-Yves Belzile
- Brigadier-General Joseph Hector Christian Drouin
- Brigadier-General Gregory R. Smith
- Brigadier-General Jean-Marc Lanthier
- Brigadier-General William Francis Seymour

===== Second Award - Officer of the Legion of Merit =====
- Brigadier-General Jean-Marc Lanthier

==== Bronze Star Medal ====
Undress ribbon for Bronze Star Medal of the United States of America

- Brigadier-General Simon C. Hetherington
- Major Frank D. Lamie
- Major Matthew M. Tompkins

==== Defence Meritorious Service Medal ====
Undress ribbon of the Defence Meritorious Service Medal of the United States

- Major Ian T. Grant
- Major Anthony Johnson
- Commander Edward C. King
- Lieutenant-Colonel Bruce MacLean
- Colonel Louis-Henri Rémillard
- Major Dragisa Ivkovic (deceased)
- Lieutenant-Colonel Louis-Benoit J. Dutil
- Lieutenant-Colonel Blair D. Ashford
- Colonel Eric Jean Kenny
- Captain Joseph P. McNulty

==== Meritorious Service Medal ====
Undress ribbon of the Meritorious Service Medal of the United States

- Major Kevin P. Barker
- Lieutenant-Commander Barrie Brett
- Chief Warrant Officer Martin Colbert
- Major Craig Derenzis
- Major Timothy G. Dwyre
- Captain Christopher T. Inglis
- Major Neil B. Marshall
- Lieutenant-Colonel Todd A. Murphy
- Commander Darren Rich
- Lieutenant-Colonel Cody Sherman
- Lieutenant-Colonel Donald Warren Smith
- Major Yanick J. Tardif
- Major Sharon A. Daley
- Major Steven L. Hewitt
- Lieutenant-Commander Roderick Macleod
- Lieutenant-Colonel Ryan M. M. Smith
- Lieutenant-Colonel John A. Van der Laan
- Captain Justin Behiels
- Lieutenant-Colonel Anthony Majintha Dejacolyn
- Major John Agusta Dempsey
- Major Leslie Joseph Philippe Ferris
- Lieutenant-Colonel Carla Harding
- Major Joseph André Benoit Mainville
- Major Bryce Marshall Morawiec
- Major Crystal Brook Morrison
- Lieutenant-Colonel Kevin Ng
- Captain Richard Andrew Havelock Nicholson
- Chief Warrant Officer Bryan Keith Pierce
- Major Germain Poirier
- Captain Leah Schutte
- Major Mark Hugh Smith
- Major Laurie Ann Bauer
- Lieutenant-Colonel Kenneth Freeman Butterworth
- Major Michael William Collacutt
- Major Timothy W. Day
- Lieutenant-Colonel Andrew B. Gault
- Major Neil Gregory
- Major Lucjan Grela
- Lieutenant-Colonel Stephen Theodorus Hanson
- Captain Guillaume Hébert
- Major Jill Hobson
- Major Jan-Peter A. Hoekstra
- Lieutenant-Commander Joel Kam
- Major Gordon James Albert Lemon
- Major Paul Edward Leonard
- Lieutenant-Colonel David Scott MacGregor
- Colonel William James McLean
- Major Trevor Kent Michelsen
- Major Michael Wade Moulton
- Colonel Damon Allan Perrault
- Captain Steven Pineau
- Lieutenant-Colonel Joseph Garry Pospolita
- Lieutenant-Colonel Ronald A. Puddister
- Lieutenant-Colonel Phillip Alastair Rennison
- Major Tanya Robertson
- Lieutenant-Commander Peter Francis Rohe
- Lieutenant-Commander Joseph Armand Clément Rouleau
- Captain Callum Thomas Smith
- Major Jeffrey Tebo
- Major Dorian P. Trenton
- Chief Warrant Officer Joseph Pascal Turcotte
- Major Neal O. Whitman
- Major Todd William Young
- Lieutenant-Colonel Darrel Chester Michael Zientek
- Major Christopher R. Boileau

== Erratums of Commonwealth and Foreign Orders, Decorations and Medal awarded to Canadians ==
=== Corrected on 29 July 2019 ===
==== From 26 December 2015 ====
From the His Majesty The Emperor of Japan, the Order of the Rising Sun, Gold and Silver Rays to Mr. Martin Blake Kobayashi.

==== From 30 July 2016 ====
From the President of Finland, Cross of Merit of the Order of the White Rose to Mr. Brian Vilho Koivu and Mr. Niilo Kustaa Saari.

==== From 04 February 2017 ====
From the His Majesty The Emperor of Japan, Order of the Rising Sun, Gold Rays with Neck Ribbon, to Mr. Arthur Kazumi Miki.

==== From 24 June 2017 ====
- From the His Majesty The Emperor of Japan, the Order of the Rising Sun, Gold and Silver Star to Mr. Joseph Caron.
- From the His Majesty The Emperor of Japan, the Order of the Rising Sun, Gold Rays with Neck Ribbon to Mr. Mark James Surrette and Mr. David Boyer Waterhouse.
- From the His Majesty The Emperor of Japan, the Order of the Rising Sun, Gold Rays with Rosette to Ms. Noella Marie Gaudreault.
- From the His Majesty The Emperor of Japan, the Order of the Rising Sun, Gold and Silver Rays to Mr. Wally Ursuliak.

=== Corrected on 26 August 2017 ===
==== From 24 September 2016 ====
From the President of the Republic of Austria, the gold medal for Services to the Republic of Austria to Mrs. Ernestine Tahedl
