= 2011 Canadian honours =

Canadian government recognitions

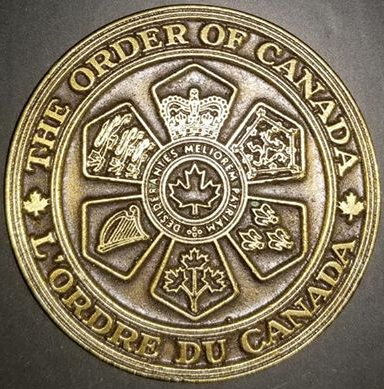
The Seal of the Order of Canada

The following are the appointments to various Canadian Honours of 2011. Usually, they are announced as part of the New Year and Canada Day celebrations and are published within the Canada Gazette during year. This follows the custom set out within the United Kingdom which publishes its appoints of various British Honours for New Year's and for monarch's official birthday. However, instead of the midyear appointments announced on Victoria Day, the official birthday of the Canadian Monarch, this custom has been transferred with the celebration of Canadian Confederation and the creation of the Order of Canada.

However, as the Canada Gazette publishes appointment to various orders, decorations and medal, either Canadian or from Commonwealth and foreign states, this article will reference all Canadians so honoured during the 2011 calendar year.

Provincial Honours are not listed within the Canada Gazette, however they are listed within the various publications of each provincial government. Provincial honours are listed within the page.

== The Order of Canada ==
=== Officer of the Order of Canada ===
Undress ribbon of an Officer of the Order of Canada

- Nicole Brossard, O.C.
- Sylvia R. Cruess, O.C.
- James A. Dosman, O.C., S.O.M.
- The Honourable René Dussault, O.C., O.Q.
- Angela Enright, O.C.
- Clément Gosselin, O.C.
- Linda Hutcheon, O.C.
- Anthony Edward Thomas Lang, O.C.
- Maurice McGregor, O.C., C.Q.
- Shelagh Rogers, O.C. .
- Mary Vingoe, O.C.
- Harry Walsh, O.C.
- André D. Bandrauk, O.C.
- William Buyers, O.C.
- The Honourable Herménégilde Chiasson, O.C.
- Lorna Crozier, O.C.
- Alain Lefèvre, O.C., C.Q.
- Terence Macartney-Filgate, O.C.
- Denis Marleau, O.C., C.Q.
- Bob McDonald, O.C.
- Maureen O'Neil, O.C.
- Viola Robinson, O.C., O.N.S.
- Maureen Sabia, O.C.
- Peter Alexander Singer, O.C.
- Annette Verschuren, O.C.
- Hayley Wickenheiser, O.C.
- Ronald G. Worton, O.C. - This is a promotion within the Order

=== Members of the Order of Canada ===
Undress ribbon for a Member of the Order of Canada

- Patricia Aldana, C.M.
- Marthe Asselin-Vaillancourt, C.M., C.Q.
- Bernard Blishen, C.M.
- Robert Bourdeau, C.M.
- Ronald Caplan, C.M.
- Marc Chouinard, C.M.
- The Honourable Erminie J. Cohen, C.M.
- Anthony Comper, C.M.
- Elizabeth Comper, C.M.
- Paul Copeland, C.M.
- Ollie Currie, C.M.
- Pierre Fréchette, C.M., C.Q.
- Monique Giroux, C.M.
- David Halliday, C.M.
- Robert D. Hare, C.M.
- Hanny A. Hassan, C.M.
- Michael Hayden, C.M., O.B.C.
- Martha Lou Henley, C.M.
- Ellis Jacob, C.M.
- Gilles Julien, C.M.
- Jamie Kennedy, C.M.
- Derek Key, C.M., O.P.E.I.
- Camille Limoges, C.M.
- Trevor Linden, C.M., O.B.C.
- Joy Maclaren, C.M.
- John McLaughlin, C.M., O.N.B.
- Howard (Howie) W. Meeker, C.M.
- Gwyn Morgan, C.M.
- Daniel Nestor, C.M.
- Rudolph North, C.M.
- Eric Peterson, C.M.
- Shirley Post, C.M.
- Terrence Punch, C.M.
- Charlene M. T. Robertson, C.M.
- Jennifer Simons, C.M.
- Tricia Smith, C.M.
- Mavis Staines, C.M.
- Beth Symes, C.M.
- Robert H. Taylor, C.M.
- Robert C. P. Westbury, C.M.
- Edwina Wetzel, C.M.
- Christopher Wiseman, C.M.
- Arnold Aberman, C.M.
- Shirley Bear, C.M.
- Jeanne Besner, C.M.
- Anita Best, C.M.
- John M. W. Bradford, C.M.
- The Honourable Patricia Carney, P.C., C.M.
- Vera Dewar, C.M.
- Joan Donald, C.M.
- Frank F. Fagan, C.M.
- Mary Lou Fallis, C.M.
- Edra Sanders Ferguson, C.M.
- Jean-Claude Fouron, C.M.
- Marie Gignac, C.M.
- John H. V. Gilbert, C.M.
- Malcolm Gladwell, C.M.
- Dorothy Griffiths, C.M., O.Ont.
- Paul Valdemar (Valdy) Horsdal, C.M.
- Frederick Hyndman, C.M.
- Frederic L. R. Jackman, C.M., O.Ont.
- Ruth E. Kajander, C.M.
- Josef Kates, C.M.
- Pierre Lavoie, C.M., C.Q.,
- Eugene Levy, C.M.
- Pierre Maranda, C.M.
- Robert Y. McMurtry, C.M.
- Alvaro Morales, C.M.
- Larry Nelson, C.M.
- Pierre Nepveu, C.M.
- Samantha Joan Nutt, C.M., O.Ont. S
- Nino Ricci, C.M.
- Bernard Saladin d'Anglure, C.M.
- David William Shannon, C.M., O.Ont.
- David Staines, C.M., O.Ont.
- F. Thomas Stanfield, C.M.
- W. Brett Wilson, C.M.

== Order of Military Merit ==
=== Commanders of the Order of Military Merit ===
Undress ribbon for a Commander of the Order of Military Merit

- Rear-Admiral Nigel Stafford Greenwood, C.M.M., C.D. - This is a promotion within the Order
- Major-General Joseph Marcel Marquis Hainse, C.M.M., C.D. - this is a promotion within the Order
- Major-General Tom James Lawson, C.M.M., C.D. This is a promotion within the Order
- Rear-Admiral Paul Andrew Maddison, C.M.M., M.S.M., C.D. - This is a promotion within the Order
- Major-General Mark Edmund McQuillan, C.M.M., C.D.
- Major-General Guy Robert Thibault, C.M.M., C.D.

=== Officers of the Order of Military Merit ===
Undress ribbon for an Officer of the Order of Military Merit

- Captain(N) Scott Edward George Bishop, O.M.M., C.D.
- Lieutenant-Colonel Allan Eric Bratland, O.M.M., C.D.
- Lieutenant-Colonel Kevin Francis Bryski, O.M.M., C.D.
- Major James Randall Burton, O.M.M., C.D.
- Colonel Kenneth André Corbould, O.M.M., C.D.
- Commander Anthony Robert Evans, O.M.M., C.D.
- Lieutenant-Commander Cindy Bernadette Galt, O.M.M., C.D.
- Colonel Martin Girard, O.M.M., C.D.
- Brigadier-General Paul-Émilien Richard Simon Hébert, O.M.M., C.D.
- Colonel David Gerald Henley, O.M.M., C.D.
- Lieutenant-Colonel Patricia Henry, O.M.M., C.D.
- Colonel Jean-Marc Lanthier, O.M.M., M.S.C., M.S.M., C.D.
- Commander Robert Lewis-Manning, O.M.M., C.D.
- Lieutenant-Colonel Deborah Lynn McKenzie, O.M.M., C.D.
- Lieutenant-Colonel Shawn Darric McKinstry, O.M.M., C.D.
- Lieutenant-Colonel Darryl Albert Mills, O.M.M., M.S.C., C.D.
- Colonel Richard Francis Pucci, O.M.M., C.D.
- Lieutenant-Colonel Joseph Joël Roy, O.M.M., C.D.
- Colonel James Baxter Simms, O.M.M., C.D.
- Captain(N) Martin William Teft, O.M.M., C.D.
- Lieutenant-Colonel Homer Chin-nan Tien, O.M.M., C.D.
- Chief Warrant Officer Bernard Joseph Noël Verreault, O.M.M., C.D.- This is a promotion within the Order
- Lieutenant-Colonel Lawrence James Zaporzan, O.M.M., C.D.

=== Members of the Order of Military Merit ===
Undress ribbon for a Member of the Order of Military Merit

- Sergeant Jorgan Aitaok, M.M.M., C.D. (Canadian Ranger)
- Chief Warrant Officer Mark Arden, M.M.M., C.D.
- Chief Warrant Officer Denise Aimee Ballermann, M.M.M., C.D.
- Master Warrant Officer Robert Paul Bartlett, M.M.M., C.D.
- Chief Warrant Officer Joseph Yvan Denis Bédard, M.M.M., C.D.
- Chief Warrant Officer Joseph Bernard Alain Bergeron, M.M.M., C.D.
- Chief Warrant Officer Gerard Joseph Brennan, M.M.M., C.D.
- Major Patrick Albert Denis Brizay, M.M.M., C.D.
- Master Warrant Officer Kirby Vincent Burgess, M.M.M., C.D.
- Petty Officer 1st Class Joseph François Luc Champagne, M.M.M., C.D.
- Sergeant Joseph Jacques Mario Charette, M.M.M., M.B., C.D.
- Chief Petty Officer 1st Class Malcom Derek Conlon, M.M.M., C.D.
- Captain Joseph Charles Serge Côté, M.M.M., C.D.
- Sergeant Russell Wayne Coughlin, M.M.M., C.D.
- Chief Warrant Officer Bernard Joseph Curtis, M.M.M., C.D.
- Chief Warrant Officer William Darling, M.M.M., C.D.
- Warrant Officer Robert Allan David, M.M.M., C.D.
- Master Warrant Officer Joseph Raymond Yves Demers, M.M.M., C.D.
- Warrant Officer William Francis Doupe, M.M.M., C.D.
- Master Warrant Officer Stephen Christopher Downey, M.M.M., C.D.
- Chief Petty Officer 1st Class Walter Joseph Bernard Dubeau, M.M.M., C.D.
- Chief Warrant Officer Joseph Peter Dulong, M.M.M., C.D.
- Captain Sylvain Charles Falle, M.M.M., C.D.
- Chief Petty Officer 1st Class Michael Craig Feltham, M.M.M., C.D.
- Chief Petty Officer 2nd Class Richard Alton Fisher, M.M.M., C.D.
- Sergeant Lorne Emerson Lionel Ford, M.M.M., C.D.
- Warrant Officer Melina Dorothy Ann Fournier, M.M.M., C.D.
- Major Carl Gauthier, M.M.M., C.D.
- Chief Warrant Officer Daphine Viola Germain, M.M.M., C.D.
- Lieutenant(N) Corey Lloyd Ellis Gleason, M.M.M., C.D.
- Chief Warrant Officer Joseph Ernest Gilles Godbout, M.M.M., C.D.
- Chief Warrant Officer Joseph Lucien Éric Gravel, M.M.M., C.D.
- Chief Warrant Officer Gerald Olympe Gravelle, M.M.M., C.D.
- Chief Warrant Officer Alain Grenier, M.M.M., C.D.
- Warrant Officer Sean Michael Hansen, M.M.M., C.D.
- Captain Paul Henry Hartinger, M.M.M., C.D.
- Captain John Douglas Hill, M.M.M., C.D.
- Master Warrant Officer Richard David Hills, M.M.M., C.D.
- Warrant Officer Murray Clair Hiltz, M.M.M., C.D.
- Warrant Officer Kevin Thomas Johnson, M.M.M., M.S.M., C.D.
- Master Warrant Officer Edward James Kilcup, M.M.M., C.D.
- Master Warrant Officer Marc Daniel Lafontaine, M.M.M., C.D.
- Master Warrant Officer William Kenneth Laing, M.M.M., C.D.
- Chief Petty Officer 2nd Class Stephen Joseph Lamarche, M.M.M., C.D.
- Sergeant Frédéric Gilles Joseph Lavoie, M.M.M., C.D.
- Warrant Officer Robert Ronald Leblanc, M.M.M., C.D.
- Petty Officer 2nd Class James Anthony Leith, M.M.M., S.C., M.S.M., C.D.
- Chief Warrant Officer Robert Colin MacDonald, M.M.M., C.D.
- Master Warrant Officer Donald Nolan MacIntyre, M.M.M., C.D.
- Petty Officer 1st Class Arthur Wilberforce MacLeod, M.M.M., C.D.
- Warrant Officer Patricia Susan MacWilliams, M.M.M., C.D.
- Captain William McAuley, M.M.M., C.D.
- Chief Petty Officer 1st Class Michael Daniel McCallum, M.M.M., C.D.
- Warrant Officer Craig Richard McKay, M.M.M., C.D.
- Major Wendy Mae McKenzie, M.M.M., C.D.
- Warrant Officer David Francis McLaughlin, M.M.M., C.D.
- Master Warrant Officer Shawn Anthony Mercer, M.M.M., M.S.M., C.D.
- Master Warrant Officer Kenneth Miles, M.M.M., C.D.
- Chief Warrant Officer Steven Maurice Milton, M.M.M., C.D.
- Captain William English Moore, M.M.M., C.D.
- Master Warrant Officer Marie Rose Christine Ouellet, M.M.M., C.D.
- Warrant Officer Bryan Keith Pierce, C.V., M.M.M., M.S.C., C.D.
- Master Warrant Officer Roy Harold Pugh, M.M.M., C.D.
- Chief Warrant Officer Joseph Vernon Pynn, M.M.M., C.D.
- Major Douglas Reid, M.M.M., C.D.
- Chief Petty Officer 1st Class Thomas Christopher Riefesel, M.M.M., C.D.
- Master Warrant Officer Joseph Henry Sampson, M.M.M., C.D.
- Chief Warrant Officer Joseph Normand Yvon Sauvageau, M.M.M., C.D.
- Chief Warrant Officer Jean-Paul Savoie, M.M.M., C.D.
- Chief Petty Officer 2nd Class Angela Lynne Schenkers, M.M.M., C.D.
- Warrant Officer Marie Lucette Sylvie Seaward, M.M.M., C.D.
- Master Warrant Officer Patrick Henry Simms, M.M.M., C.D.
- Warrant Officer Wayde Lee Simpson, M.M.M., M.B., C.D.
- Master Warrant Officer Carol Snow, M.M.M., C.D.
- Chief Warrant Officer Andrew Peter Stapleford, M.M.M., C.D.
- Captain Terrence Gordon Stead, M.M.M., C.D.
- Master Warrant Officer Keith Charles Thibault, M.M.M., C.D.
- Chief Warrant Officer David Charles Tofts, M.M.M., C.D.
- Master Warrant Officer Guy Tremblay, M.M.M., C.D.
- Chief Warrant Officer Joseph Louis Philippe Turbide, M.M.M., C.D.
- Captain Joseph Napoléon Denis Veilleux, M.M.M., C.D.
- Petty Officer 1st Class Paul Joseph Walsh, M.M.M., C.D.
- Master Warrant Officer Lise Marie Juliette Ward, M.M.M., C.D.
- Captain Shannon Marie Wills, M.M.M., C.D.
- Master Warrant Officer John Cameron Winters, M.M.M., C.D.

== Order of Merit of the Police Forces ==
=== Officers of the Order of Merit of the Police Forces ===
Undress ribbon of an Officer of the Order of Merit of the Police Forces

- Assistant Commissioner Line Carbonneau
- Director General Robert Fahlman
- Chief Robert Herman
- Deputy Chief Constable Warren Lemcke
- Chief Dale R. McFee (promotion within the Order)
- Superintendent Brian Simpson
- Chief A. Paul Smith
- Chief Wendy Southall

=== Members of the Order of Merit of the Police Forces ===
Undress ribbon of a Member of the Order of Merit of the Police Forces

- Deputy Chief Danny Aikman
- Director Serge Bélisle
- Deputy Chief Gary Broste
- Assistant Commissioner J. G. P. Michel Cabana
- Staff Sergeant Jean-Marc Collin
- Deputy Chief Troy Cooper
- Superintendent Robert Davis
- Chief Glenn De Caire
- Chief Henry DeLaronde
- Chief Frank Elsner
- Deputy Chief Eric Girt
- Chaplain R. A. (Bob) Harper
- Superintendent Timothy Head
- Sergeant Toby Hinton
- Superintendent Andrew Hobbs
- Superintendent Jamie Jagoe
- Director Kristine Kijewski
- Chief Superintendent Alphonse MacNeil
- Ms. Sylvie Mantha
- Superintendent Kathryn Martin
- Assistant Commissioner Dale McGowan
- Staff Superintendent Jeffrey McGuire
- Chief Stephen McIntyre
- Chief Superintendent Blair McKnight
- Staff Sergeant Terry McLachlan
- Detective Raymond Wai-Sang Miu
- Deputy Chief Robert Napier
- Chief Superintendent Richard Noble
- Detective Inspector Dennis Olinyk
- Deputy Chief Bernard Pannell
- Assistant Director Marc Parent
- Staff Sergeant Joseph Roch Stephen Patterson
- Assistant Director Mario Plante
- Chief Murray Rodd
- Staff Sergeant Stéphane St-Jacques
- Chief Joseph Tomei

== Most Venerable Order of the Hospital of St. John of Jerusalem ==
Undress ribbon for all grades of the Most Venerable Order of the Hospital of St. John of Jerusalem

=== Knights and Dames of the Order of St. John ===
- Her Honour, the Honourable Edna Elias
- J. Stuart Clyne
- Major Richard Choquette, CD
- The Honourable Noël Kinsella
- His Honour, the Honourable Douglas George Phillips
- His Honour, the Honourable Lester Tuccaro
- Norma Doreen Laird

=== Commanders of the Order of St. John ===
- Gary A. Jack
- Lieutenant-Colonel Paul John Tuz, CD
- Shelly Jenneane Burrows
- Robert H. White
- Commander Alaric John Martin Woodrow, CD
- Lieutenant-Colonel André M. Levesque, CD

=== Officers of the Order of St. John ===
- Sylvie Babin
- Leslie M. Brannagan
- Daniel Faucher
- Michael John Lawrence
- Mary Jo Rees
- Lieutenant-Colonel Richard Stepaniuk, CD,
- Lorne R. Heslop
- Nancy Katherine Hutchinson
- Commodore Hans W. Jung, CD
- Richard Lauzière
- Richard Neville

=== Members of the Order of St. John ===
- Lieutenant(N) Timothy Allen
- Andrew Lance Binette
- Randall Edward George Burtch
- Major Michael T. A. Calnan
- Patricia JoAnn Copperthwaite
- Captain Silvio Neves Da Silva
- Corporal/Caporal Kathryn Ann Davis, CD
- Reverend Roman Dusanowskyj
- Lieutenant-Colonel (Retired) David Clarke Fletcher, CD
- Lieutenant-Colonel (Retired) George Thomas Frid
- Annick Gauthier
- Kimberly Irene Giddens
- Annabel Gills
- Monique Grambin-White
- Vivian Maria Sze Ngar Ho
- Nahum Ip
- Linda Patricia Kelly
- Greg S. Kobernick
- Stephanie A. Minshull
- Kimberley Dawn Mitchell
- Kevin R. Morgan
- Mark Henderson Pound
- Diane L. Presley
- Adam Jack Prieur
- Ryan William Smith
- Derek Matthew Vollrath
- Elizabeth Florence Waite
- Lois Diane Wilson
- Lieutenant(N) Suzanne Debra Anderson, CD
- Maxime Boutin-Caron
- Harold Cameron Campbell
- Robert John Cristofoli
- Sergeant Andrew Shawn Daring
- Patricia Anne Dwyer
- Captain (Retired) Gary Robert Hayes, CD,
- Elaine Heinicke
- Brigadier General, the Reverend Doctor David C. Kettle, CD
- David Alan King
- Carl Laurent Joseph Larouche
- Clive Law
- Ferguson Mobbs, CD
- Melanie Rose Peters
- Lisa Rowe
- Ivan Stevic
- Alexandra Sandy Tobler
- Master Warrant Officer Maurice James Chapman

== Provincial Honours ==
=== National Order of Québec ===
==== Grand Officers of the National Order of Québec ====
Undress ribbon for a Grand Officer of the National Order of Québec

- Margaret Becklake, G.O.Q.
- Monique Miller, G.O.Q.
- Rosario Tremblay, G.O.Q.

==== Honorary Grand Officer of the National Order of Québec ====
- His Excellency Abdou Diouf, G.O.Q.

==== Officers of the National Order of Québec ====
Undress ribbon for an Officer of the National Order of Québec

- Simon Brault, O.Q.
- Jean-Charles Coutu, O.Q.
- Jean-Marc Eustache, O.Q.
- Max Gros-Louis, O.Q.
- Christophe Guy, O.Q.
- GILLES JULIEN, O.Q.
- CLAUDE LABERGE, O.Q.
- RITA LAFONTAINE, O.Q.
- GILLES LOISELLE, O.Q.
- EMANUELE (LINO) SAPUTO, O.Q.
- ALVIN CRAMER SEGAL, O.Q.

==== Knight of the National Order of Québec ====
Undress ribbon for a Knight of the National Order of Québec

- ALAIN BEAUDET, C.Q.
- NATHALIE BONDIL, C.Q.
- MICHELINE BOUCHARD, C.Q.
- PIERRE BOUCHER, C.Q.
- MONIQUE C. CORMIER, C.Q.
- FRANÇOIS COUSINEAU, C.Q.
- PIERRE DALOZE, C.Q.
- JEAN-PAUL GRAPPE, C.Q.
- CÉCILE GRENIER, C.Q.
- PIERRE HARVEY, C.Q.
- FABIENNE LAROUCHE, C.Q.
- LOUIS LAVIGUEUR, C.Q.
- MONIQUE LEFEBVRE, C.Q.
- MICHEL MAZIADE, C.Q.
- MICHEL NOËL, C.Q.
- JEAN PERRAULT, C.Q.
- RUTH ROSE, C.Q.
- Éric St-Pierre, C.Q.
- PAULINE WONG, C.Q.

=== Saskatchewan Order of Merit ===
Undress ribbon for a member of the Saskatchewan Order of Merit

- Chief Darcy M. Bear, S.O.M.
- Joseph L. Bourgault, S.O.M.
- Dr. Edward F. G. Busse, S.O.M., F.R.C.P.S.(C)
- Ronald Carson, S.O.M.
- Malcolm Jenkins, S.O.M.
- Courtney Milne, S.O.M. (1943-2010) (posthumous)
- Dr. Karim W. Nasser, S.O.M.
- Shirley Schneider, S.O.M.
- Ruth Smillie, S.O.M.

== Secret appointments ==
- His Excellency the Right Honourable David Johnston, Governor General and Commander-in-Chief of Canada, on the recommendation of the Chief of the Defence Staff, has awarded four Stars of Military Valour, two Medals of Military Valour, one Meritorious Service Cross (Military Division), three Meritorious Service Medals (Military Division) and two Mentions in Dispatches to members of the Canadian Special Operations Forces Command for military activities of high standard that have brought great honour to the Canadian Forces and to Canada. For security and operational reasons, recipients' names and citations have not been released.

== Military Valour Decorations ==
=== Star of Military Valour ===
Undress ribbon for the Star of Military Valour

- LIEUTENANT GABRIEL CHASSÉ-JEAN, S.M.V.
- MASTER WARRANT OFFICER RICHARD STACEY, S.M.V., C.D.

=== Medal of Military Valour ===
Undress ribbon for the Medal of Military Valour

- SERGEANT T. DAVID BÉRUBÉ, M.M.V.
- MASTER CORPORAL SIMON R. FRIGON, M.M.V.
- SERGEANT JOSEPH MARTIN STÉPHANE MERCIER, M.M.V., C.D.
- LEADING SEAMAN PIER-VINCENT MICHAUD, M.M.V.
- SERGEANT JOSEPH DENIS FRANÇOIS RANGER, M.M.V., C.D.

== Canadian Bravery Decorations ==
=== Star of Courage ===
Undress ribbon for the Star of Courage

- Angela Jeanette Stirk
- Fontella Twoyoungmen (posthumous)
- Private Adam J. P. Fraser
- Corporal Déri J. G. Langevin
- Kenneth Franklin Lehman
- Corporal Marc-André Poirier

=== Medal of Bravery ===
Undress ribbon for the Medal of Bravery

- Clermont Bélanger
- Jean-Louis Clavet
- Marie-Claude Élie
- Serge Fournier
- Robert Francoeur
- Yvon Lévesque
- Yvan Pruneau
- Constable Jean-François Rousselle
- Michael Lee Anderson
- Norman Anderson (posthumous)
- RCMP Constable Andrew Ashton
- Brent Michael Blackmore
- Robert C. Bombardir
- Leading Seaman Cory K. Bond
- Darryl Fabian Boone
- Kingsley Cheung
- Darren Coogan
- Archie L. Coughlin
- Sergeant Delkie Curtis
- Jubal Daley
- Jewel Denison
- Lieutenant(N) Christopher Michael Devita, C.D.
- Ratko Ray Djuric
- Constable Patrick Duerden
- Brian Dean Fowlow
- Dennis William Robert Fowlow
- Bonnie Gamble
- Gordon Joseph Gamble
- Krista Dorothy Girvan
- Donald George Gough
- Donald Neil Harper (posthumous)
- Jeremy Hodder
- Justin Kenneth Darwin Ilnicki
- Matthew Michael Jackson
- Jewel James
- Tara Michelle Josey
- Nadine Anik Leduc
- Tamsen Laine Lahnalampi
- Kevin Joseph Leski
- Tyler Norman David Lockerby
- Dean Lucas
- Tina Maryann Moores (posthumous)
- RCMP Constable Shane Douglas Nicoll
- Barry Ryder Nilsen
- Patrick Robert O'Connor
- Sergeant John K. Potts
- Steven C. Reynolds
- Wayne Reynolds
- Timothy Andrew Rider
- Sharon Yvonne Rider
- Eric Roy (posthumous)
- Vince P. Sharpe
- Sharon Rose Sparks
- Chance Stewart
- Constable Michelle Stinson
- James Jacob Daniel Thede
- Sergeant Roger Thomas
- Pazia Toyne
- Vanna Jade Twoyoungmen
- Major Frank Wagener
- Glen William Watts
- Constable Christopher C. Wells
- Russell Ryan Werner
- Sheldon Steven Willier
- Twain Wright
- Maxime Bondu
- Sergeant André Coallier
- Constable Scott Dargie
- Steve Degrace
- Denis Diotte
- Monique Gagnon
- Constable Karine Giroux
- Kevin Gooding
- Bernard Keetash
- Richard Kelly (posthumous)
- Lana Mae Krieser
- Constable George J. MacNeil
- André J. Maillet
- J. Robert Maillet
- William Edward Matthews
- Constable Kris Miclash
- Mark Montour
- Ross P. Moore
- Jeffrey Neekan
- Geneviève Otis-Leduc
- Alexandre Phaneuf
- Constable David Pilote
- Jean-François Renault
- Tyler Glenn Sampson (posthumous)
- Madden Sarver
- Elaine Kathryne Spray (posthumous)
- Jakki Spray
- Frank William Taylor
- Constable Daniel Tétreault
- Kevin Thomas
- Philbert Truong (posthumous)
- Ian Joseph Wheeler, C.D.
- Kathryn Whittaker

== Meritorious Service Decorations ==
=== Meritorious Service Cross (Military Division) ===
Undress ribbon for Meritious Service Cross in the military division

- MAJOR TIMOTHY MAURICE ARSENAULT, M.S.C., C.D
- PETTY OFFICER 2nd CLASS MARTIN JOSEPH CLAUDE BÉDARD, M.S.C., C.D.
- LIEUTENANT-COLONEL MARC BIGAOUETTE, M.S.C., C.D.
- GENERAL FRANCISZEK GĄGOR, M.S.C. (Posthumous) (Polish Armed Forces)
- CHIEF WARRANT OFFICER JULES JOSEPH MOREAU, M.M.M., M.S.C., C.D.
- LIEUTENANT-COLONEL JOCELYN J. M. J. PAUL, M.S.C., C.D.
- GENERAL DAVID H. PETRAEUS, A.O., M.S.C. (United States Army)
- REAR-ADMIRAL TYRONE HERBERT WILLIAM PILE, C.M.M., M.S.C., C.D.
- SERGEANT MICHAEL ADAM SMITH, M.S.C., C.D.
- LIEUTENANT-COLONEL GILBERT CLEMENT THIBAULT, M.S.C., C.D.
- LIEUTENANT-COLONEL CARL JEAN TURENNE, M.S.C., C.D.
- BRIGADIER-GENERAL JONATHAN HOLBERT VANCE, O.M.M., M.S.C., C.D.

=== Meritorious Service Medal (Military Division) ===
Undress ribbon for the Meritious Service Medal in the military division

- MAJOR DARRYL GORDON ADAMS, M.S.M., C.D.
- COLONEL ANTHONY JOSEPH MARK HILAIRE ASHFIELD, M.S.M., C.D.
- BRIGADIER-GENERAL ROBERT J. BELETIC, M.S.M., (United States Air Force)
- SERGEANT LEE WILLIAM EDWARD BIBBY, M.S.M., C.D.
- MASTER CORPORAL STÉPHANE JOSEPH MICHEL RICHARD, M.S.M., C.D.
- COLONEL GREGORY CHARLES BILTON, AM, CSC, M.S.M. (Australian Army)
- MAJOR EMANUEL JEANNOT BOUCHER, M.S.M., C.D.
- CORPORAL MATHIEU S. BOULAY-PAILLÉ, M.S.M.
- COLONEL GREGORY DAWSON BURT, O.M.M., M.S.M., C.D.
- MAJOR Trevor John Cadieu, M.S.M., C.D.
- MAJOR LUIS C. CARVALLO, M.S.M., C.D.
- SERGEANT PATRICE PASCAL CHARTRAND, M.S.M., C.D.
- LIEUTENANT-COLONEL SCOTT NORMAN CLANCY, M.S.M., C.D.
- CAPTAIN MARC A. DAUPHIN, M.S.M., C.D.
- MAJOR GENERAL MART C. DE KRUIF, M.S.M. (Royal Netherlands Army)
- LIEUTENANT-COLONEL ROLAND GRANT DELANEY, M.S.M., C.D.
- MASTER CORPORAL JONATHAN D. J. DÉZIEL, M.S.M.
- CHIEF WARRANT OFFICER JOSEPH RICHARD DENIS DOMPIERRE, M.S.M., C.D.
- MAJOR JEAN-FRANÇOIS DUVAL, M.S.M., C.D.
- MAJOR J. R. MARIO FERLAND, M.S.M., C.D.
- LIEUTENANT-COLONEL GYULA JOHN JOSEPH GERGELY, M.S.M., C.D.
- LIEUTENANT-COLONEL LEE JOHN HAMMOND, M.S.M., C.D.
- COMMANDER CHRISTOPHER JOHN HARGREAVES, O.M.M., M.S.M., C.D.
- CORPORAL FRANÇOIS-JONATHAN GILLES MICHEL HÉBERT, M.S.M.
- SERGEANT WILLIAM JOSEPH KELLAND, M.S.M., C.D.
- CAPTAIN ANDREW JOHN MERCER, M.S.M., C.D.
- WARRANT OFFICER KEITH PAUL MITCHELL, C.V., M.S.M., C.D.
- SERGEANT DAVID MICHAEL PAWULSKI, S.C., M.S.M., C.D.
- LIEUTENANT-COLONEL JOSEPH JEAN-PAUL CHRISTIAN LABROSSE, M.S.M., C.D.
- CHIEF WARRANT OFFICER GRÉGOIRE RAYMOND LACROIX, M.M.M., M.S.M., C.D.
- COLONEL JOSEPH CONRAD ROCH LACROIX, M.S.M., C.D.
- CAPTAIN FRANCIS JOSEPH MICHEL MALLET, M.S.M., C.D.
- SERGEANT CHARLES ANDREW MCLEAN, M.M.M., M.S.M., C.D.
- HONORARY COLONEL STANLEY A. MILNER, O.C., A.O.E., M.S.M., C.D
- MAJOR JOSEPH SERGE RAYNALD MORIN, M.S.M., C.D.
- MAJOR YANNICK PÉPIN, M.S.M., C.D. (Posthumous)
- SERGEANT JOSEPH FRANÇOIS COLIN PICHÉ, M.S.M., C.D.
- COLONEL JOHN BRUCE PLOUGHMAN, M.S.M., C.D.
- CHIEF WARRANT OFFICER JOSEPH GERARD GILBERT POIRIER, M.M.M., M.S.M., C.D.
- CHIEF WARRANT OFFICER ERNEST GÉRARD JOSEPH POITRAS, M.S.M., C.D.
- LIEUTENANT-COLONEL JAMES JOSEPH RAOUL NORMAND RICHARDSON, M.S.M., C.D.
- COLONEL MARIE CÉLINE DANIELLE SAVARD, M.S.M., C.D.
- MAJOR PAUL SCANNELL, M.S.M. (British Army)
- CHIEF WARRANT OFFICER ANDREW PETER STAPLEFORD, M.S.M., C.D.
- HONORARY CAPTAIN (N) CEDRIC STEELE, M.S.M., C.D.
- LIEUTENANT-COLONEL ANN-MARIE BRIGITTE TARDIF, M.S.M., C.D.
- LIEUTENANT-COLONEL JOHN TRINGALI, M.S.M. (United States Air Force)
- MAJOR JOSEPH RICHARD MARC VERRET, M.S.M., C.D.
- LIEUTENANT-COLONEL MICHAEL WHITED, M.S.M. (United States Army)

== Mention in Dispatches ==
- Master Corporal Étienne Aubé
- Sergeant Sébastien Joseph Yves Belval
- Master Corporal Isabelle Corbeil
- Warrant Officer Joseph Jean Denis Justin Côté, C.D.
- Corporal Guillaume De Celles
- Sergeant Joseph Gaetan Phillippe Jr. Dessureault, C.D.
- Sergeant Bjorn Ivo Dittmar
- Sergeant Joseph André Jacques Sylvain Énault, C.D.
- Master Corporal Francis Fréchette
- Private William Allen Geernaert
- Captain David Lacombe
- Corporal Antonin Ladet
- Master Corporal Simon Lavoie
- Sergeant Joseph Yvan Richard Lecavalier, C.D.
- Sergeant Oliver Lee
- Captain Christian Maranda
- Corporal Martin Matte
- Corporal Jona Nlandu
- Captain Manuel Pelletier-Bédard
- Corporal Billy Pilote-Jobin
- Private Dave Potvin
- Sergeant Éric Adolphe Renaud, C.D.
- Master Corporal Steven Robertson, C.D.
- Corporal Kevin Rowland
- Captain Mathieu Saikaly
- Petty Officer 2nd Class Kenneth Richard White, C.D.
- Corporal Joseph Luc Richard Lareau
- Captain Kurt Evan Schweitzer
- Sergeant Joseph Michel Côté
- Master Corporal Simon Girard
- Corporal Simon-Pierre Larochelle
- Private Samuel Côté
- Private Mathieu Sansoucy

== Commonwealth and Foreign Orders, Decorations and Medal awarded to Canadians ==
=== From Her Majesty The Queen in Right of Australia ===
==== Australian Service Medal with "Timor Leste" clasp ====
- Warrant Officer Dominic Thomas Clarke

==== Australian Active Service Medal with International Coalition Against Terrorism clasp ====
- Major Jason C. Kenny
- Captain Douglas B. Publicove

=== From Her Majesty The Queen in Right of the United Kingdom ===
==== Operational Service Medal (Afghanistan) ====
- Captain Scott Donald Lloyd
- Lieutenant-Colonel Lawrence Donald William Haisell
- Captain Jean-Marc Fugulin
- Captain Marcel Rochat
- Master Corporal Clarence Hamilton Smith
- Major Jeremy Keith Alexander Fountain
- Major Andrew James Hewitt
- Captain Jameel J. Janjua
- Captain Martin Duchesneau

==== Operational Service Medal (Iraq) ====
- Major Stephen William Carius
- Captain Philip Alastair Rennison
- Captain Jean-Marc Fugulin

=== From the President of Austria ===
==== Cross of Honour for Science and Art 1st Class ====
- Dr. Harry Schachter

==== Grand Decoration of Honour ====
- Mr. Michael Novac

==== Grand Decoration of Honour for Services to Austria ====
- Professor Julio Montaner

=== From His Majesty the King of the Belgians ===
==== Commander of the Order of the Crown ====
- Mr. Benoît Pelletier

==== Civic Medal, 1st class ====
- Ms. Christine Osteux

=== From the President of Finland ===
==== Cross of Merit of the Order of the Lion of Finland ====
- Mr. Sauli Häkkinen
- Mr. Pentti Henrik Järvenpää

=== From the President of France ===
==== Grand Cross of the National Order of the Legion of Honour ====
- The Right Honourable Michaëlle Jean, P.C., C.C., C.M.M, C.O.M., C.D.

==== Commander of the National Order of the Legion of Honour ====
- General Walter Natynczyk
- The Honourable Louise Arbour

==== Officer of the National Order of the Legion of Honour ====
- The Honourable Daniel P. Hays
- The Honourable Donald Johnston
- Mrs. Marie-Josée Kravis
- Mrs. Liliane Stewart
- Dr. Michel Chrétien

==== Knight of the National Order of the Legion of Honour ====
- Mrs. Jacqueline Desmarais
- Mr. Arthur Haché
- Mrs. Yolande Cohen
- Mrs. Michèle Stanton-Jean
- Mr. Pierre Lavallée
- Mr. Pierre Théberge

==== Grand Officer of the National Order of Merit ====
- Mr. Herménégilde Chiasson

==== Officer of the National Order of Merit ====
- Colonel Georges Rousseau
- Ms. Louise Limoges

==== Knight of the National Order of Merit ====
- Lieutenant-Colonel Laurent Caux
- Mrs. Lynn Gagnon

==== Commander of the Order of the Academic Palms ====
- Mr. Dominique-Louis Piron
- Mr. Benoît Pelletier

==== Knight of the Order of the Academic Palms ====
- Mr. Louis Allain
- Ms. Dominique Égée
- Mr. Wally Lazaruk
- Ms. Jacqueline Marthone-Kernisant
- Ms. Carole Saint-Louis
- Mrs. Lyse-Ann Bélanger
- Mrs. Louise Lewin Bengualid
- Mr. Roger Delisle
- Mr. Bernard Grève
- Mr. Jean-Paul Létourneau
- Mr. Jacques Marois
- Mrs. Christina Angers Serafin
- Mr. Andrew J. B. (John) Johnston
- Mr. Ghassan Helou
- Mrs. Eliane Camerlynck
- Mr. Laurier Fortin

==== Officer of the Order of Agricultural Merit ====
- Mr. Denis Marsan

==== Knight of the Order of Agricultural Merit ====
- Mr. Pierre Jury
- Mrs. Laura Calder

==== Officer of the Order of Arts and Letters ====
- Mr. Dany Laferrière
- Mr. Robert Lepage

==== Knight of the Order of Arts and Letters ====
- Mrs. Marie Gignac
- Mr. Jacques Girard
- Mr. Bruno Laplante
- Mr. Paul Lefebvre
- Mrs. Ginette Reno
- Mrs. Nicole Sévigny
- Mr. Jim Sinclair
- Mrs. Michèle Valiquette
- Mr. Jeff Wall
- Mr. Dominique Denis
- Mrs. Estelle Desfossés
- Mr. Jacques Emond
- Mrs. Louise Forand-Samson
- Mrs. Ginette Gauthier
- Mr. Jean-François Paquin
- Mrs. Danielle Poiré
- Mrs. Esther Trépanier

==== National Defence Medal, Gold Echelon with Gendarmerie Nationale Clasp ====
- Superintendent Mark Archiebald Mc Gowan
- Assistant Commissioner William Allan Smith

==== National Defence Medal, Silver Echelon with "armée de l'air" clasp ====
- Colonel Sylvain Bédard

==== National Defence Medal, Silver Echelon ====
- Colonel Michael Pearson Cessford

==== National Defence Medal, Bronze Echelon with Gendarmerie Nationale Clasp ====
- Staff Sergeant Jim Power
- Staff Sergeant Major David R. Tipple

==== National Defence Medal (Bronze Echelon) ====
- Warrant-Officer Vincent Gagnon

==== Foreign Affairs Medal of Honour (Bronze) ====
- Mrs. Judite Varela

=== From the President of Germany ===
==== Honour Cross of the German Armed Forces ====
- Major Pierre Lépine

==== Cross of the Order of Merit ====
- Mr. Gerhard Spindler
- Mrs. Helene Maria Bolte

=== From the President of Honduras ===
==== Order of Merit ====
- Mr. Daniel Arsenault

=== From the President of Hungary ===
==== Knight's Cross of the Order of Merit ====
- Ms. Agnes Bessenyei
- Professor Alan Walker

=== From the President of Italy ===
==== Commander of the Order of Merit ====
- Mr. Pier Angelo Paternieri

==== Knight of the Order of Merit ====
- Mr. Carmine Virginio D'Argenio
- Mr. Emilio B. Imbriglio
- Mr. Giuseppe Cosimo Maiolo
- Mr. Benito Migliorati
- Mr. Paolo Venerino Tamburello
- Ms. Rosanna La Valle

==== Knight of the Order of Merit for Labour ====
- Mr. Teodoro Ottaviano

==== Grand Officer of the Order of the Star of Solidarity ====
- The Most Reverend James Martin Hayes

==== Knight of the Order of the Star of Solidarity ====
- Mr. Ferdinando Bisinella
- Mr. Donato Caivano
- Mrs. Giovanna Del Vecchio
- Mrs. Imelda Facchin
- Mrs. Franca Giacomelli
- Mr. Renzo Orsi
- Mr. Eligio Adolfo Paris
- Mr. Calogero Puma
- Mr. Walter Simone
- Mrs. Luisa Zoncheddu Solinas

=== From His Majesty The Emperor of Japan ===
==== Grand Cordon of the Order of the Rising Sun ====
- The Right Honourable Brian Mulroney, P.C., C.C., G.O.Q.

==== Order of the Rising Sun, Gold Rays ====
- Ms. Joy Nozomi Kogawa

==== Order of the Rising Sun, Gold and Silver Star ====
- The Honourable Bryon Wilfert

==== Order of the Rising Sun, Gold and Silver Star ====
- The Honourable Bryon Wilfert

==== Order of the Rising Sun, Gold Rays with Neck Ribbon ====
- Mr. Albert Diamond Cohen
- Mr. John William Craig

==== Order of the Rising Sun, Gold Rays with Rosette ====
- Mr. Yuzuru Kojima

==== Order of the Rising Sun, Gold and Silver Rays ====
- Mr. William Moncrief

==== Order of the Rising Sun, Silver Rays ====
- Mr. Yoichi Saegusa
- Mr. Yoshihisa Nagaishi

=== From the President of Latvia ===
==== Order of the Three Stars ====
- Mrs. Inta Purvs

=== From the President of Lithuania ===
==== Commander's Cross of the Order of Merit ====
- Dr. Biruté Galdikas

=== From His Royal Highness The Grand Duke of Luxembourg, Duke of Nassau ===
==== Commander Order of the Oak Crown ====
- The Honourable Philippe Kirsch

=== From Her Majesty The Queen of the Netherlands ===
==== Member of the Order of Orange-Nassau ====
- Mrs. Ria Koster

=== From the Secretary General of the North Atlantic Treaty Organization ===
==== Meritorious Service Medal ====
- Lieutenant-General Jan Arp
- Chief Petty Officer 1st Class Martial Côté
- Brigadier-General David A. Fraser
- Major Stephen Hanson
- Lieutenant-Colonel Allan Francis Walsh
- Commander Richard Leo Perks
- Brigadier-General Kenneth A. Corbould

=== From the President of Poland ===
==== Officer's Cross of the Order of Merit ====
- Mr. Benedykt Bylicki
- Mr. Wilhelm Siemienski
- Dr. Frank Dimant
- Mr. Walter Perchal
- Dr. Ryszarda Russ-Pasowski

==== Knight's Cross of the Order of Merit ====
- Mr. Roger Furmanczyk
- Mrs. Bogumila Szulc
- Mr. Zdzislaw Marczynski (posthumous)
- Mr. Jozef Tadeusz Bigder
- Mr. Maksymilian Kubacki (posthumous)
- Mr. Jozef T. Kazimowicz

==== Officer's Cross of the Order of Polonia Restituta ====
- Mr. Zdzislaw Krynski
- Mr. Stanislaw Lasek
- Mr. Bogdan Idzikowski

==== Gold Cross of Merit ====
- Mr. Samuel Wenzel Billich
- Mr. Stefan Padowicz
- Mrs. Wladyslawa Rolicz
- Mrs. Teresa Sobol
- Mr. Stefan Wladysiuk
- Mrs. Anna Czerwinska (posthumous)
- Mrs. Czeslawa Janowska
- Mr. Wladyslaw Gladkowski (posthumous)
- Mr. Zbroislaw Orzechowski
- Mrs. Maria Osadca
- Mr. Kajetan Bieniecki
- Mr. Ryszard Bojarski
- Mr. Andrzej Bortnowski
- Mr. Euzebiusz Jadlowski (posthumous)
- Mr. Tadeusz Kubow
- Mrs. Elzbieta Lyszkiewicz
- Mrs. Barbara Pinkowska
- Mr. Tadeusz Pinkowski (posthumous)
- Mr. Edward Rolicz
- Mr. Waclaw Zakrzewski (posthumous)
- Mr. Zbigniew Bieniawski
- Mr. Zygmunt Horawski
- Mr. Zygmunt Lender
- Mrs. Regina Sadowska

==== Silver Cross of Merit ====
- Mr. Marek Balazinski
- Mrs. Bozena Chylewska
- Mr. Stanislaw Chylewski
- Mr. Alfred Halasa
- Mr. Andrzej Jarosz
- Mrs. Wanda Smoragiewicz
- Mr. Antoni Kostka
- Mrs. Bozena Ewa Augustyniak
- Mrs. Barbara Gaczowska
- Mrs. Alina Danuta Kapuscinska
- Mr. Zrzysztof Kosewski
- Mr. Zbigniew Nawrot
- Mrs. Jolanta Woznowska-Vu
- Mr. Jan Kaminski

==== Bronze Cross of Merit ====
- Mrs. Grazyna Nawrot

==== Long Term Marriage Relationship Medal ====
- Mr. Andrew Boleslaw Pernal
- Mrs. Nan Barton Pernal

=== From the President of Russia ===
==== Order of Friendship ====
- Mrs. Anna Varpakhovskaya

==== Pushkin Medal ====
- Mr. Andrew Donskov
- Mrs. Donna Tussing Orwin
- Professor John Stuart Durrant
- Ms. Natalia Taryshkina

==== Medal for the Merits in Exploring Outer Space ====
- Dr. Robert Brent Thirsk

=== From His Majesty The King of Spain ===
==== Cross of the Order of Naval Merit with White Distinction ====
- Mr. Jean-Pierre Andrieux

=== From His Majesty The King of Thailand ===
==== Member of The Most Noble Order of the Crown ====
- Dr. Kevin McCormick

=== From the President of Ukraine ===
==== Order of Merit, 3rd Class ====
- Dr. Julia Woychyshyn

=== From the Government of the United States of America ===
==== Officer of the Legion of Merit ====
- Lieutenant-General Jan Arp
- Brigadier-General Camil Giguère
- Brigadier-General Nicholas E. Matern
- Brigadier-General Alan J. Howard
- Brigadier-General Paul Wynnyk
- Brigadier-General Gary J. O'Brien
- Captain (N) Alain L. Garceau
- Brigadier-General Nicolas E. Matern
- Brigadier-General Douglas C. Hilton
- Colonel Michael J. Pearson
- Major-General Michael J. Ward

==== Bronze Star Medal ====
- Colonel Kevin R. Cotten
- Colonel Michael R. Dabros
- Lieutenant-Colonel Kevin Tyler
- Colonel Dave E. Barr
- Major Kevin Billinghurst
- Lieutenant-Colonel Kevin F. Bryski
- Major Philip Hernen
- Brigadier-General David A. Fraser
- Colonel Marc R. Gagné
- Colonel David G. Henley
- Lieutenant-Colonel Scott G. Long
- Major Sean B. Wyatt

==== Meritorious Service Medal ====
- Captain Mark Ihab Abraham
- Major Donna Lee Allen
- Major Patrice Beauchamp
- Captain (N) Richard J. J. R. Bergeron
- Major David S. Blackburn
- Major Douglas R. Bugeaud
- Major Alain Dallaire
- Major Gabriel Doré
- Lieutenant-Commander Paul E. Francoeur
- Lieutenant-Commander Craig L. Marsh
- Lieutenant-Colonel James A. McLean
- Major Jason C. Randall
- Major David R. Rudnicki
- Major Glenn C. Barbour
- Colonel Sylvain Bédard
- Colonel William N. Brough
- Major Martin Dufour
- Warrant Officer Kenneth E. Johnson
- Chief Warrant Officer William T. McCarroll
- Lieutenant-Colonel Jacques J. Pellan
- Lieutenant (N) Antoine Bakhache
- Major Ernest K. Crowell
- Major Marla Dow
- Major Krista Dunlop
- Lieutenant-Colonel James Duquette
- Master Warrant Officer Darcy S. Elder
- Chief Petty Officer Second Class Michael Fairfex
- Colonel Robert A. Geddes
- Lieutenant-Colonel Perry A. S. Grandy
- Lieutenant-Colonel Stephen R. Kelsey
- Major James T. Kenney
- Lieutenant-Colonel Eric Kenny
- Captain Kurt T. Patrick
- Lieutenant-Colonel John M. Trayner
- Major Marc Bouchard
- Colonel André H. Dupuis
- Major Donald R. Henley
- Colonel Stephen G. Laplante
- Corporal Christopher J. Latta
- Captain Kevin J. MacDonald
- Major Randle C. Moon
- Major Wallace J. Noseworthy
- Major Wade G. Oliver
- Major Marc Parent
- Lieutenant-Colonel Bruno Plourde
- Master Warrant Officer Alain Poirier
- Major Kevin Poirier
- Lieutenant-Commander Martin Raymond
- Major Todd A. Smart
- Captain Kenneth R. Stewart
- Lieutenant-Colonel Pierre C. St-Laurent
- Lieutenant-Colonel Ewen A. Wrighte
- Major Brent A. Clute
- Lieutenant Commander Shaina C. Leonard
- Major Michael Ashcroft
- Brigadier-General Stephen J. Bowes
- Major Brent A. Kerr
- Lieutenant-Commander Ken Osborne
- Major Desmond Brophy
- Lieutenant-Colonel Shawn D. Bindon
- Major Brian G. Carver
- Chief Warrant Officer David J. Fischer
- Lieutenant-Colonel Ronald Allison
- Lieutenant-Colonel Patrick B. Carpentier
- Major Jeffrey D. Daly
- Brigadier-General Hilary Jaeger
- Major Brian P. Nekurak
- Warrant Officer Andrew Quinn
- Warrant Officer Kenneth M. Reynolds
- Major Michael Sears
- Major Keith A. Taylor
- Major Robert G. Watters
- Captain Peter R. Casey
- Major Jean-Pierre Lafleur
- Colonel John J. Milne
- Major Marcel Farley
- Lieutenant-Commander David S. Martin

==== Air Medal, First Oak Leaf Cluster ====
- Major Michael U. McCarthy

==== Air Medal ====
- Captain Bruce Bell
- Major Juan C. Gallego
- Captain Darren J. MacIsaac
- Major Michael U. McCarthy
- Warrant-Officer Harold Shortt
- Major Leonard M. Wappler
- Major Leonard A. Kosciukiewicz
- Master Corporal Jerry T. Larkin
- Warrant-Officer Richard B. Mongeon
- Warrant-Officer Marc H. Pilon
- Major Gerald R. D. Anderson
- Major David K. Helfenstein
- Warrant Officer Stephen M. Heus
- Captain Stephen MacLeish
- Captain David A. McNiff
- Captain Quinton V. Oliviero
- Captain Joshua Riley
- Captain Donald T. Saunders
- Sergeant David K. Joy
- Sergeant Robert C. Kerr
- Sergeant James R. McCarron
- Warrant Officer J. B. McLaren
- Captain Ryan J. L. O'Neill
- Master Corporal Chris A. Walsh
- Captain Christopher J. Horner
- Major Scott G. Marshall
- Sergeant Theresa K. McLaren
- Lieutenant William A. Natynczyk

== Erratums of Commonwealth and Foreign Orders, Decorations and Medal awarded to Canadians ==
=== Corrected on 12 March 2011 ===
- The notice published on page 3086 of the December 4, 2010 issue of the Canada Gazette, Part I, is hereby amended as follows: From the President of France, the National Defence Medal, Silver Echelon with clasp "Infantry" to Captain Kevin Crowell and Lieutenant-Colonel Jacques Pellan
- The notice published on page 146 of the January 29, 2011 issue of the Canada Gazette, Part I, is hereby amended as follows: From His Majesty The Emperor of Japan, the Order of the Rising Sun, Gold Rays with Rosette to Mrs. Joy Nozomi Kogawa

=== Corrected on 30 April 2011 ===
- The notice published on page 864 of the March 12, 2011, issue of the Canada Gazette, Part I, is hereby amended as follows: From the President of Poland, the Silver Cross of Merit to Mrs. Grazyna Nawrot
- The notice published on page 1073 of the March 26, 2011, issue of the Canada Gazette, Part I, is hereby amended as follows: From the President of the United States of America, the Meritorious Service Medal to Captain (N) Kenneth R. Stewart
