= Huntington University =

Huntington University may refer to:

- Huntington University (Canada) in Ontario
- Huntington University (United States) in Indiana

== See also ==
- Huntingdon College, in Montgomery, Alabama, formerly a women's college
