= Kevin McCormick =

Kevin McCormick may refer to:

- Kevin McCormick (South Park), minor fictional character on the animated TV series South Park
- Kevin McCormick (producer), American film executive, credits include Burglar
- Kevin McCormick (educator) (born 1965), president and vice-chancellor of Huntington University, Ontario, Canada
- Kevin McCormick (comic artist), American author of the 1980s comic strip Arnold
- Kevin McCormick (music producer), American producer of several albums including Melissa Etheridge
- Kevin McCormick, Libertarian candidate for governor of Arizona, 2018
