= Innu Meshkenu =

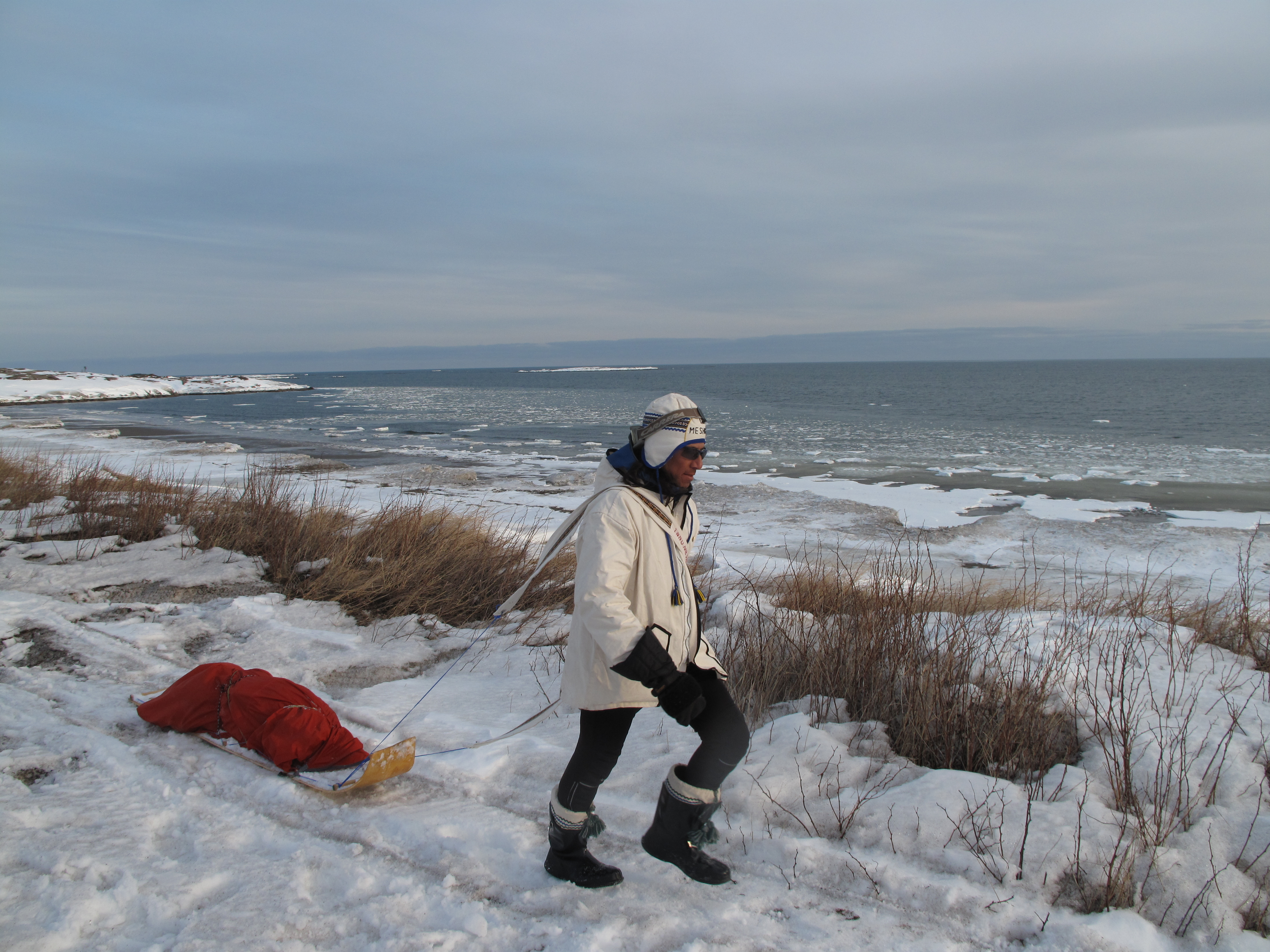
Stanley Vollant walking.

Innu Meshkenu is a walk undertaken by the first aboriginal surgeon in Québec, Stanley Vollant. This 6,000-kilometre (3,700 mi) walk passes through all the aboriginal communities in the eastern Canada. The walk started in the Fall of 2010 and was expected to last for five years. As of April 2016, the walk was nearing an end.

Stanley Vollant walks sometimes alone, sometimes with other Aboriginal or non-Aboriginal walkers.

The name "Innu Meshkenu" comes from Innu language and means "The Innu trail".

== The objectives of Innu Meshkenu ==
Innu Meshkenu aims at raising Aboriginal people's awareness concerning two main points : school perseverance and healthy life habits. The project also attempts to enhance Aboriginal cultural identity. In order to reach those objectives, Stanley Vollant stops in schools and other gathering places in the communities that he visits and meet people of all ages.

== Annexes ==
=== Educational material ===
- Where is Stanley?
- Laurence Lemieux, Tracer son chemin, Comic book.

=== Biography ===
Mathieu-Robert Sauvé, Dr Stanley Vollant : Mon chemin innu.

=== External links ===
- Innu Meshkenu's website : https://en.puamun.com/a-propos/#comp-k9cxpnym

=== Press articles ===
- https://www.theglobeandmail.com/life/how-natives-find-power-in-a-long-distance-walk/article11873970/
- https://web.archive.org/web/20140714171252/http://www.universityaffairs.ca/pilgrimage-of-innu-surgeon-stanley-vollant.aspx
- http://www.lapresse.ca/le-quotidien/actualites/201303/11/01-4629718-3000-km-a-pied-pour-le-dr-stanley-vollant.php
- https://web.archive.org/web/20140530025327/https://fr-ca.divertissement.yahoo.com/news/dr-stanley-vollant-re%C3%A7oit-prestigieux-prix-203410674.html
- http://www.net/compostelle-1987-le-quotidien-actualites-201109-15-01-4447855-la-longue-marche-de-vollant-php
- http://www.lactualite.com/culture/le-compostelle-autochtone/
- https://web.archive.org/web/20160303193534/http://www.innu-meshkenu.com/wp-content/uploads/2014/02/Communiqu%C3%A9-Dr-Stanley-Vollant-troque-le-bistouri-pour-le-b%C3%A2ton-de-marche-JCF.pdf
