= Yolande Cohen =

Canadian historian

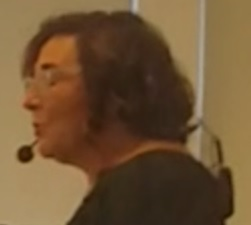
- Born: 1950 (age 75–76); Meknes, Morocco
- Citizenship: Canadian
- Occupations: historian; professor; politician
- Awards: Knight of the National Order of the Legion of Honour; Knights of the National Order of Québec

Academic work
- Discipline: Historian
- Sub-discipline: History of youth; History of women; History of Moroccan Jews

Yolande Cohen (born 1950) is a Moroccan-born Canadian historian and professor of contemporary history whose research focuses upon History of Youth and the History of Women. A Moroccan Sephardi, she also focuses on the History of Moroccan Jews. In the 1990s, Cohen was a politician, the initial leader of the Coalition Démocratique–Montréal Écologique municipal political party and its candidate for mayor in the 1994 municipal election. Cohen is a Fellow of Royal Society of Canada. Her awards include Knight of the National Order of the Legion of Honour and Knight of the National Order of Québec.

== Early life and education ==
Yolande Cohen was born in Morocco, 1950. She has younger brothers. She studied in Paris in 1968, then immigrated to Quebec.

== Career ==
Cohen was a lecturer in Rimouski, Quebec, in 1976. In the same year, she worked as a history teacher at the Université du Québec in Montreal. She is involved in the founding of "Vélo Québec, du Regroupement des femmes du Québec et de Montréal écologique". Cohen has also taught at Harvard University, Princeton University, the University of California, Los Angeles, the School for Advanced Studies in the Social Sciences and the Paris Nanterre University.

She is the author of several academic works, including Les jeunes, le Socialisme et la guerre : Histoire des Mouvements de jeunesse en France; Femmes de parole. L’Histoire des Cercles de fermières du Québec; and Femmes philanthropes : Catholiques, Protestantes et Juives dans les Organisations caritatives au Québec. Since its creation in February 2012, Cohen also occasionally writes for HuffPost, Quebec edition, publishing blog posts on various subjects.

In 1994, Coalition démocratique de Montréal merged with Montréal Écologique to become the Coalition Démocratique–Montréal Écologique, a municipal political party that existed till 1998. Cohen was its initial leader and its candidate for mayor in the 1994 municipal election. She was also a candidate for city council in the 1998 Montreal municipal election.

== Awards and honours ==
- 2011, Knight of the National Order of the Legion of Honour
- Fellow, Royal Society of Canada. In 2012, she was elected President of the Academy of Arts, Letters and Human Sciences of the Royal Society of Canada.
- 2013, Finalist, Women of the Year Competition, organized by the organization Arab Women's Space, in two categories: (a) art and culture, and (b) teaching and research
- 2017, Knight of the National Order of Québec

== Selected works ==
- Les Mouvements de jeunesse socialiste en France : espoirs et échecs, 1880-1905, 1978
- Femmes et politique, 1981
- Les thèses universitaires québécoises sur les femmes, 1921-1981, 1983
- Les jeunes, le socialisme et la guerre : histoire des mouvements de jeunesse en France 1989
- Encrages féministes : un moment de réflexion dans la recherche féministe, 1989
- Role of women's movements in enlarging citizenship in Québec, 1997
- Féminismes et identités nationales : les processus d'intégration des femmes au politique, 1998
- Femmes de parole : l'histoire des Cercles de fermières du Québec, 1915-1990, 1990
- Femmes philanthropes : Catholiques, Protestantes et Juives dans les Organisations caritatives au Québec, 2000
- Religion et politique dans les sociétés contemporaines, 2006
- Identités sépharades et modernité, 2007
- Le rôle des mouvements de femmes dans l'élargissement de la citoyenneté au Québec, 2012
- Les Sépharades du Québec : parcours d'éxils nord-africains, 2017
