= Robert Bourdeau =

Canadian photographer (born 1931)

- Born: November 14, 1931 (age 94); Kingston, Ontario
- Spouse(s): Mary Eardley, married 1961
- Awards: Order of Canada (2011)

Robert Bourdeau CM RCA (born November 14, 1931) is a Canadian photographer whose career bridges modernists of the early 20th century and contemporary photographers.

== Biography ==
Bourdeau was born in Kingston, Ontario, in 1931. In 1957, he moved to Toronto for a year to attend the University of Toronto, before returning to Kingston. After coming across a copy of Aperture magazine, Bourdeau corresponded with then-editor Minor White in Rochester, New York in 1958, then met him, and for the next ten years, the two men were in contact. Bourdeau soon decided, encouraged by White, that taking photographs was the correct path for him, although he worked in a job as an architecture technologist (1960–1985). Another mentor was Paul Strand who he corresponded with, then met, in New York in 1965. With these photographers as mentors, he was drawn in his early work to modernism. He has also spoken of Paul Cézanne and Giorgio Morandi as being influential.

At first, his chosen subject was landscape which he photographed in black-and-white. His choice of scenes in Canada, Ireland and elsewhere were presented in luminous detail but gave the viewer not the surface but the spirit of the natural world. His work developed over time to a more measured, meditative view and he introduced architecture into his subject matter, preferably architecture which spoke to an historical time. Generally, his work is marked by a sense of growth and change. Bourdeau says: "I hold the conviction that emotional forces generated by a place can be made visible."

Since the 1970s, Bourdeau has created large camera format images, which he methodically prepares from contemplating a site for a lengthy period before making an extended exposure that allows a maximum of detail. He is known for his technical perfection, and for the unique gold chloride solution that adds a warm tone to his silver gelatin prints. The Encyclopedia of Twentieth-Century Photography calls his work remarkable for its rigorous consistency while the Globe and Mail in 2005 called his photographs of abandoned or inactive industrial sites and buildings of the past "beautifully precise" and "immaculate". The Calgary Herald, in 1989, said of a show of his work at the Glenbow Museum, that his work is "beautiful, meditative, alive with tonal richness and compressed details, and still in atmosphere, all in ways that reward long looking".

In 1966, he had his first exhibition in Canada at the National Film Board Still Photography Division and in 1969, the National Gallery of Canada acquired his work for the first time. Another breakthrough occurred in 1980 when Jane Corkin, who had an important photography gallery in Toronto, decided to represent him. Only in 1985 was he able to work at photography full-time. His commitment was crowned by success: in 1990, he had a retrospective at the National Gallery of Canada, Robert Bourdeau: Retrospective. That same year, he began his keynote series of photographs of industrial sites.

He has exhibited his work widely throughout North America and Europe. In Canada, he has been included in photographic surveys at the National Gallery of Canada and the Canadian Museum of Contemporary Photography (now the Canadian Photography Institute or CPI) of the National Gallery of Canada. In 2016, Linda Jansma curated the exhibition Edge of the Visible for the Robert McLaughlin Gallery in Oshawa. In 2011, Robert Bourdeau: The Station Point, a comprehensive survey of his work, was published by the Magenta Foundation and Stephen Bulger Gallery.

His work is in the collections of the Centre Georges Pompidou, Paris; the Smithsonian Institution, Washington, DC; the Museum of Contemporary Art, Chicago; and The Renaissance Society, Chicago; the Museum of Fine Arts, Boston; the Los Angeles County Museum of Art; the Art Gallery of Ontario, Toronto; the National Gallery of Canada, the Canadian Photography Institute, Ottawa; the Robert McLaughlin Gallery, Oshawa; as well as Library and Archives Canada, Ottawa and the Canadian Centre for Architecture, Montreal.

Bourdeau taught photography at the University of Ottawa from 1980 to 1994. He currently lives in Ottawa.

== Awards and honours ==
He was elected to the Royal Canadian Academy of Arts in 1983. He was named a member of the Order of Canada in 2011. In 2017, Canada Post issued a stamp using his work.
