= Stanley Vollant =

Canadian surgeon (born 1965)

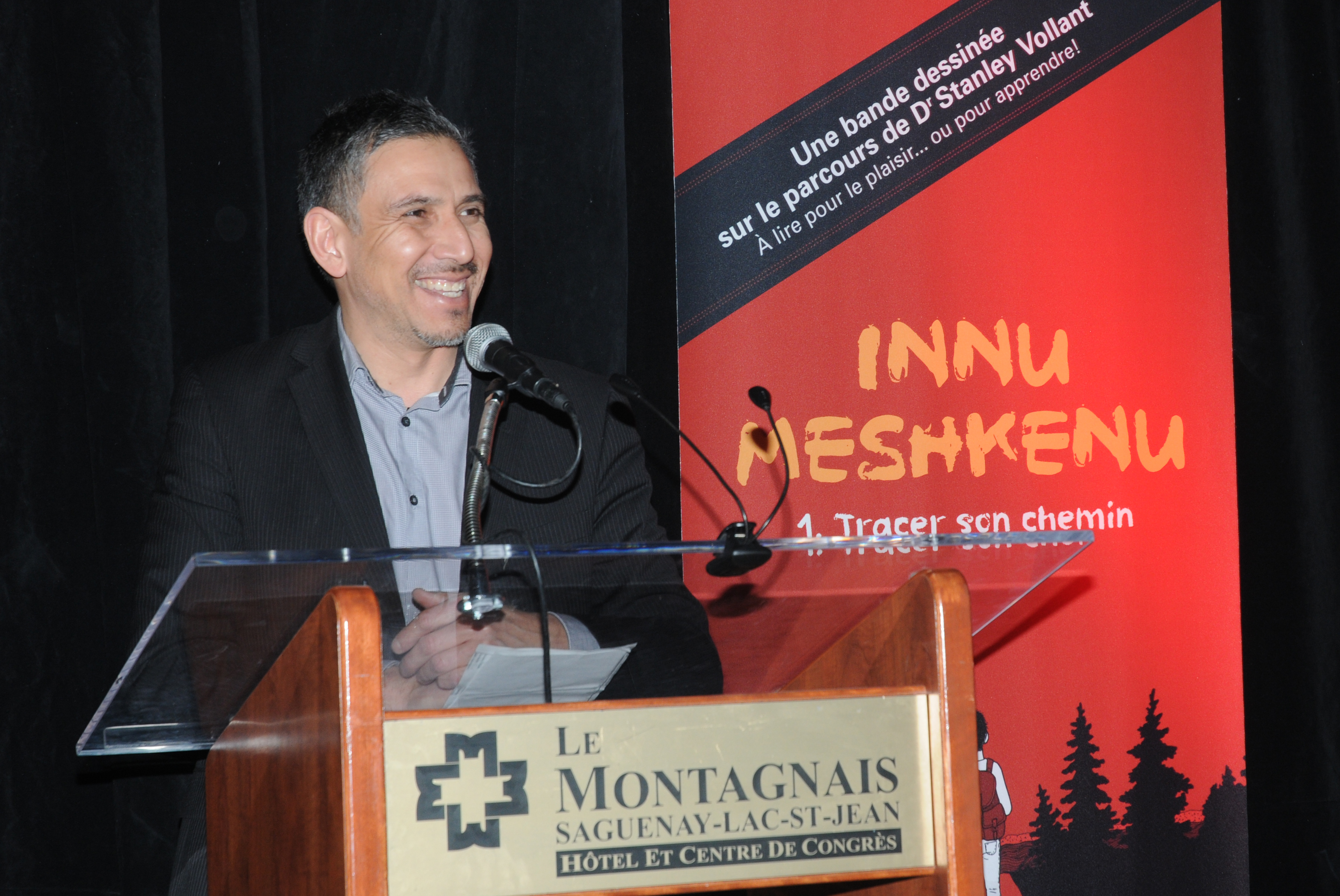
Stanley Vollant, at the release of his comic book Tracer son chemin.

Stanley Vollant CM CQ MSC (born April 2, 1965) is an Innu surgeon from the aboriginal community of Pessamit, which is located by the course of the St-Lawrence River, in the Côte-Nord region of Quebec.

== Career ==
Vollant pursued his secondary and post-secondary education in the Québec region before obtaining a MD diploma from Université de Montréal in 1989. He then completed his training in 1994 with a specialization in general surgery. In 1994, Vollant became the first aboriginal surgeon born in Québec, Canada. He specializes in laparoscopy. In December of the same year, Vollant began his career as a general surgeon in the Baie-Comeau Regional Medical Centre. Ten years later, he joined the CSSS of Chicoutimi as part of the general surgery services. He then moved on to Montfort Hospital in Ottawa where he worked as a general surgeon and as an assistant professor and director of the aboriginal program of the Faculty of Medecine of the University of Ottawa. In 2010, he became the coordinator of the Aboriginal component of the Faculty of Medicine of University of Montreal and continued to practise medicine at the Pessamit Medical Clinic, in his home village. Vollant is now a general surgeon at the Dolbeau-Mistassini Hospital.

Vollant represented 9,002 doctors as the president of l’Association médicale du Québec and served on the Executive Board of the Canadian Medical Association. Vollant was member of various organisations such as the Canadian Health Council, the Science Advisory Board of Health Canada, the Ministerial Advisory Council on Rural Health, the Conseil de la santé et du bien-être du Québec, the Comité d’éthique des sciences et technologies du Québec.

Vollant travels on foot paths trodden by his ancestors, the Innu Meshkenu. His work aims to facilitate the meeting of people in First Nations communities and neighbouring communities to, among others, inspire young people about the importance of education and the acquisition of healthy habits. He also collects seniors’ knowledge and traditional medicine to contribute to the preservation and transmission of this heritage. He began his march totalling nearly 6,000 kilometres in the Fall of 2010 and expects to complete his journey in 2017.

In pursuit of his objectives, Vollant founded in 2016 the organization Path of Thousand Dreams. The mission of this foundation is "To inspire and support First Nations, Métis and Inuit to make their own journey of a thousand dreams through the development of their full mental, spiritual, physical and emotional potential."

== Awards and distinctions ==
- Top 50 des personnes qui font la promotion de la santé au Québec –WIXX Campaign from Québec en forme, 2017
- Appointed to the Order of Canada in 2022, "for his visionary leadership in ethical governance and corporate responsibility, and for his transformative advocacy of collaborative philanthropy."

== Bibliography ==
- Laurence Lemieux, Tracer son chemin, Comic book.
- Mathieu-Robert Sauvé, Dr Stanley Vollant : mon chemin innu, Biography.
