= Robert Burrell =

Canadian biomedical engineer

Doctor Robert Burrell AOE MSC FCAHS
- Born: 1952 (age 73–74); Oakville, Ontario, Canada
- Education: University of Guelph; University of Waterloo
- Engineering career
- Discipline: Biomedical engineer
- Institutions: University of Alberta
- Awards: Member of the Alberta Order of Excellence; Meritorious Service Cross; Fellow of the Canadian Academy of Health Sciences; Queen Elizabeth II Platinum Jubilee Medal; Governor General's Innovation Award; Principal Award from the Manning Foundation; Jonas Salk Award; ASM International – ASM Engineering Materials Achievement Award; World Union of Wound Healing Society Lifetime Achievement Award; Fellow of the National Academy of Inventors

Robert Burrell is a Canadian biomedical engineer, who as of 2026 is chair in the Department of Biomedical Engineering in the Faculty of Medicine and Dentistry at the University of Alberta. He was Canada Research Chair at University of Alberta for two terms.

Burrell was born in 1952 in Oakville, Ontario, and he obtained his first degrees at the University of Guelph. He was awarded the Meritorious Service Cross on September 27, 2016, for ground-breaking work in therapeutic medical applications of nanotechnology, and was inducted into the Alberta Order of Excellence on October 17, 2019.
