= Kevin McCormick (educator) =

Canadian educator and academic administrator

Kevin R. E. McCormick FRSA (born 1965) is the eighth president and vice-chancellor of Huntington University, located in Greater Sudbury, Ontario, Canada.

McCormick is the co-founder of several institutes including the Peruvian Canadian Institute and the Canadian Institute for Human Rights and Global Health.

McCormick served as Honorary Lieutenant-Colonel of the 2nd Battalion, Irish Regiment of Canada from 2011 to 2017 and as Honorary Colonel until 2024. Later that year, McCormick was named the Honorary Colonel of the Stormont, Dundas and Glengarry Highlanders based in Cornwall, Ontario.

== Early life and education ==
Born in Toronto, Ontario, McCormick studied sociology at York University, graduating with a Bachelor of Arts (Hons) degree in 1990 and a master's degree in 1992. McCormick went on to complete his PhD in sociology, supervised by Livy A. Visano, and focused his research on penology.

== Career ==
McCormick was a Fellow of Bethune College. and an instructor in the Sociology Department at York University. In 1997, he joined Georgian College as Dean of the Institute of University Partnerships and Advanced Studies, where McCormick was responsible for establishing undergraduate and graduate programming. This resulted in the creation of the Police Studies and Automotive Management degree programs, and the Cyberspace Security post-graduate program. In 2006, McCormick joined Huntington University as president and vice-chancellor, where he continues to preside today. At Huntington University, he has overseen the establishment of the several centres of excellence including the Lougheed Teaching and Learning Centre, the Canadian Institute for Studies in Aging, the Canadian Institute for International Policing, the Canadian Finnish Institute, the Peruvian Canadian Institute and the Canadian Institute for Human Rights and Global Health. In 2019, he was appointed as a Governor in Council for the National Seniors Council.

== Volunteerism and affiliations ==
As a volunteer, McCormick has dedicated his time to over fifty community and charity committees at a local, national, and international level.

In 2012, McCormick led the United Way campaign for Sudbury and Nipissing districts and helped raise close to $2 million for 52 community-based programs.

=== List of volunteer initiatives ===
- Big Brothers Big Sisters
- Health Sciences North
- Learning Disabilities Association
- Lifeline Sudbury
- Maison Vale Hospice
- Military Families Fund(s)
- Northern Ontario Centre for Learning Disabilities (NOCLD)
- Reseau AIDS Network
- St John Ambulance
- Sudbury Theatre Centre
- United Way
- Various refugee organizations
- Veterans' Associations
- Various refugee organizations

== Military ==
In 2011, Peter MacKay, the Minister of National Defence, named McCormick the Honorary Lieutenant-Colonel of the Irish Regiment of Canada. He served in the role until December 2017, when he was appointed Honorary Colonel of the Irish Regiment of Canada.

McCormick founded Project Honour and Preserve, a program that seeks to raise awareness of the sacrifices and contributions made by Canadian veterans. As part of this program, McCormick finds lost items belonging to veterans and repatriates them with their owners or families of the veterans, at his own expense. In 2014, he travelled across Canada to present items to various museums and veterans associations. He expanded the program in 2016 to include items from the United States and the United Kingdom.

McCormick established the Canadian Homeless Veterans Network, where he supports veterans through donations to shelters and service industries. In addition, he has used his own funds to create bursaries and scholarships to benefit members of the Canadian military and their families, and worked with the Canadian Armed Forces to create educational programs.

In 2016, McCormick received a national commendation by the Minister of Veterans Affairs.

And as Honorary Colonel, in 2018, McCormick represented the Irish Regiment of Canada attending the Prince of Wales 70th Birthday Patronage Celebration.

In 2024, McCormick was named the Honorary Colonel of the Stormont, Dundas and Glengarry Highlanders based in Cornwall, Ontario.

== Refugee work ==
Internationally, McCormick has volunteered in Myanmar, Thailand, India, Sri Lanka, Laos, Cambodia, Pakistan, and Morocco to support developmental and relief efforts. He has visited refugee camps, and purchased medical supplies, educational resources, and other supplies to help those in need.

== Awards and honours ==
| Description | Date |
|---|---|
| University-Wide Teaching Excellence Award from York University | 1996 |
| Academic Advising Award from the Sociology Undergraduate Students' Association and Department of Sociology at York University | 1996 |
| Canadian Professor of the Year Award from the Canadian Council for Advancement of Education and Council for Advancement and Support of Education | 1999 |
| Award for Innovative Excellence in Teaching, Learning and Technology from the International Conference on Teaching and Technology | 2001 |
| Awarded the Queen Elizabeth II Golden Jubilee Medal | 2002 |
| International Award of Merit from the Pontzen International Academy of Art | 2003 |
| Exemplary Leadership Award from the International Chairs Academy | 2005 |
| Award of Excellence for Humanitarianism from Chiang Mai Rajabhat University | 2008 |
| Member of the Order of the Crown of Thailand by the Kingdom of Thailand | 2010 |
| Member of the Venerable Order of St. John, awarded by The Right Honourable David Johnston | 2010 |
| Awarded the Queen Elizabeth II Diamond Jubilee Medal | 2012 |
| Received the Community Builders' Award of Excellence for Education from Laurentian Media | 2012 |
| Awarded the International Human Rights Award by the Vitanova Foundation and the International Peace Medal by the YMCA | 2015 |
| The recipient of Paul Harris Fellowship, presented by the Sunrisers and Rotary Club of Sudbury. | 2016 |
| Named a recipient of the Senate of Canada 150 Medal | 2017 |
| Named a Knight, First Class, of the Order of the White Rose of Finland | 2017 |
| Named Fellow, Community Shift by KPMG Enterprise and Ivey Business School | 2018 |
| Appointed to the National Seniors Council by the Governor General | 2019 |
| Named as a Member (Fifth Class) of the Most Exalted Order of the White Elephant, Kingdom of Thailand | 2021 |
| Named a Knight of the Order of the Stallion, Presidency of Faso Grand Chancellery of Burkinabe Orders | |

== Canadian Finnish Institute (CFI) ==
On October 8, 2015, Huntington University launched the Canadian Finnish Institute, to highlight the relationship between Finnish peoples and Canada. The centre is unique for Canada, and serves many different functions:

- to acknowledge and honour the contributions of Finnish people to Canada,
- to establish partnerships with Finnish centres of learning, and
- to celebrate Finnish-Canadian community endeavours.

In honour of former Finnish Ambassador to Canada, Charles Murto, CFI established a scholarship to award students who help foster Finnish-Canadian liaisons. Some of the CFI fellows include Judy Erola and Charles Murto.

== Peruvian Canadian Institute ==
The Peruvian Canadian Institute has been in development since 2015 and launched in 2020. It aims to support and foster enhanced relations between both nations through activities such as a Distinguished Fellowship program, scholarships, educational partnerships and events in both Canada and Peru. Dr. McCormick is the founding president.

== The Canadian Institute for Human Rights and Global Health ==
The Canadian Institute for Human Rights and Global Health (CIHRGH), a new international centre of excellence, involving participation from countries from around the globe, was established in Greater Sudbury in 2024 with Dr. Kevin McCormick being named the founding president.

Housed at Huntington University, The Canadian Institute for Human Rights and Global Health, will pull together expert researchers and academics in the fields of international human rights and/or global health from such countries as Canada, Argentina, Burkina Faso, Cameroon, Democratic Republic of Congo, Egypt, India, France, Switzerland, Netherlands, Nigeria, Peru, Thailand, Togo, Tunisia, United Arab Emirates, and the United Kingdom.

== Published works ==
McCormick, K. R., & Visano, L. A. (1992). Canadian penology: Advanced perspectives and research. Toronto: Canadian Scholars' Press.
