= Maria Labrecque-Duchesneau =

Canadian rural mental health advocate

Maria Labrecque-Duchesneau CM CQ
- Born: Maria Labrecque; May 12, 1953 (age 73); Frelighsburg, Quebec, Canada
- Education: Université du Québec à Montréal
- Occupations: Social worker, community organizer
- Known for: Founder of Au cœur des familles agricoles
- Spouse: Dollard Duchesneau (m. 1973)
- Children: 2
- Awards: Order of Canada (2020); National Order of Quebec (2017)

Maria Labrecque Duchesneau CM CQ (born May 12, 1953) is a Canadian social worker and advocate for the mental health of farm families in Quebec. She is the founder and former executive director of Au cœur des familles agricoles (ACFA; lit. 'At the Heart of Farm Families'), a Quebec organization that provides psychosocial support to farmers and their families. She has been called the "guardian angel of rural life". She is a Knight of the National Order of Quebec and a Member of the Order of Canada.

== Biography ==
Maria Labrecque is the daughter of Paul Labrecque and Lucille Houle. She grew up in a family of 14 children on her father's dairy farm with over 100 lactating cows, a farm that had once belonged to Quebec Premier Adélard Godbout (1892–1956). May 12, 1973. She married Dollard Duchesneau, with whom she had two children, Simon and Amélie. In 1988, Maria Labrecque studied psychology at the University of Quebec at Montreal. In 1998, she completed studies in palliative care and end-of-life support.

== Career ==
=== Au cœur des familles agricoles ===
Labrecque Duchesneau's career has centred on agriculture and healthcare.

From 1999 to 2000, she worked as a counsellor and facilitator at CRÉA, an organization that supports farm succession and the establishment of new farmers. There she became aware of the difficulties facing Quebec's farming community, including a high suicide rate, psychological stress, a lack of successors, and isolation, and of the absence of resources suited to the realities of farm life. She left CRÉA and founded ACFA, an organization that aims to improve the well-being of the farming community through support, screening, and prevention, and to provide front-line psychosocial services to farm families throughout Quebec.

As head of ACFA, she set up a support helpline, gave talks to farm families and later to health care workers serving the agricultural sector, created the role of travailleur de rang ("rang worker"), and organized several events. These included Quebec's first conference on health and rural life, Mieux connaître l'agriculture pour mieux comprendre l'agriculteur et sa famille ("Knowing agriculture better to better understand the farmer and their family"), held in Drummondville in February 2007.

In December 2008, as director of ACFA, Labrecque Duchesneau founded Le club des agriculteurs gais du Québec (Quebec Gay Farmers' Club), which became Fierté agricole in 2012.

In 2013, she worked on establishing the Maison ACFA in Saint-Hyacinthe, a respite house serving the psychological health needs of men and women in the farming community. She is also known for developing a new model of social intervention, rang work (travail de rang) as known as the Field Worker Mode, modelled on street outreach work and named after the rangs, the rural concession roads of Quebec.

== Honours ==
- 2014: Prix hommage at the Grands prix de la ruralité of Quebec's Ministry of Municipal Affairs, Regions and Land Occupancy.
- 2016: Honorary Doctor of Letters, presented by the Faculty of Agricultural and Environmental Sciences of McGill University.
- 2017: Knight of the National Order of Quebec.
- 2019: Mérite Adélard-Godbout of the Ordre des agronomes du Québec.
- 2020: Member of the Order of Canada
- 2021: Prix Janette-Bertrand of the Fondation Émergence.
