= Trevor Cadieu =

Canadian Army Lt General

- Education: Royal Military College of Canada
- Military career
- Allegiance: Canada
- Branch: Canadian Army (Note: Known as Land Forces Command until 2011)
- Service years: 1995–2022
- Rank: Lieutenant General
- Commands: 3rd Canadian Division
- Awards: Commander of the Order of Military Merit Meritorious Service Cross Meritorious Service Medal

Trevor John Cadieu is a retired senior Canadian military officer. He reached the rank of lieutenant general and was slated to become army commander, but after facing an allegation of sexual assault from nearly 30 years before, and after months of trial delay, took his release from the military. Cadieu maintained his innocence from the start, and encouraged a thorough investigation to expose the truth. In October 2023, the charge was stayed by an Ontario judge, ruling that unreasonable delays in disclosure by military police had violated his Charter rights. Since his release from the Canadian Armed Forces, Cadieu has spent considerable time in Ukraine providing advisory and training support to military leaders in the fight against the 2022 Russian invasion of Ukraine.

== Biography ==
Trevor Cadieu was born in Saskatchewan and raised in Vernon, British Columbia. He was commissioned as a 2nd Lieutenant in 1995 following studies at the Royal Military College of Canada (B.A. History), and was posted to Lord Strathcona’s Horse (Royal Canadians) - colloquially referred to as the Strathcona's - an armoured regiment based in Calgary, Alberta. While there, he served in armoured reconnaissance and tank squadrons including a Strathcona Battle Group deployment with the NATO Stabilization Force in Bosnia (1997) and in Kandahar, Afghanistan (2002) as Battle Captain of the Reconnaissance Squadron.

As a major, he returned to Kandahar from October 2006 to February 2007 in command of a Leopard tank squadron, part of the 1st Battalion The Royal Canadian Regiment Battle Group. Notably, this was the first Canadian tank squadron in active combat in almost 60 years. In this command, he was awarded the Meritorious Service Medal, the citation noting operational success during major offensives and other engagements against insurgents. During 2010-12, Cadieu was the Strathcona's commanding officer.

Cadieu commanded 1 Canadian Mechanized Brigade Group (2014-2016). As a brigadier-general, from July 2016 to July 2017, Cadieu was commander of Commander of Task Force Jerusalem and the inaugural commander of Task Force Middle East, establishing the regional command post in Amman, Jordan. This work to strengthen the armed forces of Jordan and Lebanon and maintain strong relations with partners in the region earned him the Meritorious Service Cross. Following this overseas tour, Cadieu was appointed commander of 3rd Canadian Division/Joint Task Force West (2017-2019) leading military forces through high-readiness training cycles and in support of several domestic operations.

As Director of Staff, Strategic Joint Staff (2019-2021), then Major-General Cadieu worked alongside interagency partners to coordinate the Canadian Armed Forces' response to the COVID-19 pandemic, wildfires and floods, and the evacuation from Afghanistan. He was promoted to Lieutenant-General in August 2021.

== Allegations ==
A ceremony to designate him Commander of the Canadian Army in September 2021 was cancelled at the last moment when information was leaked to media that military police were investigating Cadieu over allegations dating to 1994-95 when he and the complainant were students at the Royal Military College of Canada. A retired female officer alleged she was sexually assaulted when she was a first-year cadet by two senior cadets of the same rank, one of them Cadieu. In June 2022, he was charged by the Crown with two counts of sexual assault, later reduced to one count as evidence was offered during pre-trial proceedings. Cadieu maintained the allegations were false but needed to be investigated thoroughly to expose the truth. After he was publicly supported online by some serving and retired military officers including military sexual assault survivors, others responded negatively.

On October 10, 2023, the charge against Cadieu was stayed and the matter closed by Ontario Court of Justice (Kingston, Ontario), Justice Larry O'Brien, ruling that Cadieu and the co-accused lost the right to a fair trial within a reasonable time as guaranteed by the Charter of Rights and Freedoms. The judge was highly critical of the military police who investigated the complaint, ruling they were the cause of "lengthy delays" and "not responsive" in providing disclosure to the defendants. "Someone should be held accountable for allowing nine months to elapse before providing defence counsel with the complainant's first statement" to investigators, Justice O'Brien wrote. "That someone is not defence counsel who each, orally and in writing, and repeatedly requested the complainant's statement to little if any avail."

The judge's criticisms of Canadian military police procedures bore similarities to other complaints about military police competence involving allegations of misconduct of a sexual nature brought against more senior Canadian military leaders around the same time. In December 2025, in a case involving allegations against retired Maj.-Gen. Dany Fortin, the Military Police Complaints Commission determined that “investigators did not conduct a thorough and rigorous investigation,” and that the investigation was “compromised by tunnel vision, exhibited signs of investigative bias, inadequate supervisory oversight, and a failure to uphold core investigative standards.” They further determined that, “these shortcomings are not mere administrative oversights, they represent significant failures that erode public trust in military policing.”

Two other high-profile cases against senior Canadian military leaders built on insufficient military police investigations were excoriated in the courts. In October 2023, the military dropped the last of two court martial charges against Lt.-Gen Steven Whelan, including a charge of having an inappropriate relationship with a subordinate. Military prosecutors explained in court the charges were withdrawn, "based on an assessment of the evidence," just minutes before the complainant was to testify in cross-examination. And, in September 2024, Justice Matthew Webber found retired Vice-Adm. Haydn Edmundson not guilty of sexual assault, saying the complainant’s testimony in parts was “clearly tainted”, with evidence that was, variously, “altered then retracted,” sometimes “fantastical,” “materially altered from that provided police,” and even “completely implausible and unbelievable.”

== War in Ukraine ==
Soon after Russia invaded Ukraine in late February 2022, Cadieu began travelling to Ukraine, where he has spent considerable time providing advisory support, and mentoring battalion-, brigade- and corps-level headquarters on operational planning and combined arms maneouvre tactics. Russian sources often refer to him as Trevor Kadier. On 28 April, Russian media suggested he was one of as many 400 foreign fighters trapped in the Azovstal iron and steel works during the Siege of Mariupol operation. Cadieu subsequently verified that he was not captured and continued his work in Ukraine.
