= Huntington University (Canada) =

University in Greater Sudbury, Ontario

Coordinates: 46.46424°N 80.96963°W

- Type: Public
- Established: 1960
- Chancellor: Bela Ravi
- President: Kevin McCormick
- Location: Sudbury, Ontario, Canada

Huntington University is an independent university located in Greater Sudbury, Ontario, Canada. Formerly a federated college of Laurentian University, the institution announced plans in 2021 to continue as an independent institution following the termination of its federation agreement with Laurentian in 2021.

The Huntington University building overlooks much of Sudbury's campus community which includes three other local post-secondary institutions: Laurentian University, Thorneloe University and University of Sudbury.

The Huntington University residence provides co-ed accommodation for 130+ students.

== Affiliations ==
Huntington has partnered with many organizations, both national and international, including a long-standing partnership with the United Church of Canada.

== Governance ==
The university is governed by a board of regents chaired by Mary-Liz Warwick. The current president and vice-chancellor of Huntington University is Kevin McCormick. There have been five chancellors on the university's board of regents: Theodore K. Jewell (1999–2005), Rev. Murray C. Arnell (2005–2007), Edward J. Conroy (2007–2014, chancellor emeritus 2014–2016), Patricia Ann Mills (2016–2018), and presently Bela Ravi.

== History ==
The university was founded in 1960 as one of the first post-secondary establishments of northern Ontario.

== Centres of Excellence ==
Huntington University has established numerous centres of excellence, including the Peruvian Canadian Institute, Canadian Finnish Institute, Lougheed Teaching and Learning Centre, Canadian Institute for Studies in Aging, Centre for Communication Studies, and the Centre for Religion, Spirituality and Ritual Studies.

== J. W. Tate Library ==
Located within Huntington University is the J. W. Tate Library, which features a specialized collection of books, videos, fine art slides, print and electronic journal and reference subscriptions, and an assortment of films and educational videos. In fall 2010 the library, in partnership with the Lougheed Teaching and Learning Centre, launched a new student space featuring upgrades in information technology and updated resources for research. Wireless Internet access is available in the library's reading room.

== Residence ==
The Huntington University Residence provides co-ed accommodation for 130+ students in a mix of double rooms, single rooms and double/single rooms. All of the rooms are wired for free broadband Internet access and available Bell phone lines. There are also four shared kitchens, four common rooms, an exercise room with weight machines and treadmills and a games room.

The Huntington University Residence is staffed by a Residence Supervisor and four Proctors, one for each floor who are upper year students and live in the residence during the school year.

== Financial aid ==
Huntington University Residence offers scholarships and bursaries annually to its students ranging from $500 to $1,500.
