= New Democratic Party of Quebec candidates in the 1989 Quebec provincial election =

The New Democratic Party of Quebec fielded fifty-five candidates in the 1989 Quebec provincial election, none of whom were elected.

== Candidates ==
(n.c.: no candidate)

Riding	Candidate's name	Gender	Votes	%	Rank
Abitibi-Est	n.c.				
Abitibi-Ouest	n.c.				
Acadie	François Salvas	M	1,083	3.72	3rd
Anjou	Pierre Lemaire	M	688	2.84	3rd
Argenteuil	n.c.				
Arthabaska	n.c.				
Beauce-Nord	Jean-Marc Plante	M	672	3.01	3rd
Beauce-Sud	n.c.				
Beauharnois-Huntingdon	n.c.				
Bellechasse	n.c.				
Berthier	n.c.				
Bertrand	n.c.				
Bonaventure	n.c.				
Bourassa	n.c.				
Bourget	n.c.				
Brome-Missisquoi	n.c.				
Chambly	n.c.				
Champlain	n.c.				
Chapleau	n.c.				
Charlesbourg	Mario Labbé	M	1,140	3.27	4th
Charlevoix	n.c.				
Châteauguay	n.c.				
Chauveau	n.c.				
Chicoutimi	Gervais Tremblay	M	914	2.83	3rd
Chomedey	Monique Durand	F	501	1.58	4th
Crémazie	Jean Denis	M	496	1.65	4th
D'Arcy-McGee	David Alexander Schulze	M	173	0.64	6th
Deux-Montagnes	n.c.				
Dorion	Gaétan Nadeau	M	437	1.92	4th
Drummond	n.c.				
Dubuc	n.c.				
Duplessis	n.c.				
Fabre	n.c.				
Frontenac	n.c.				
Gaspé	n.c.				
Gatineau	n.c.				
Gouin	Paul Montpetit	M	482	2.33	4th
Groulx	n.c.				
Hochelaga-Maisonneuve	Jocelyne Dupuis	F	326	1.41	4th
Hull	Charles Rheault	M	673	2.66	4th
Iberville	Denis Forget	M	971	2.98	4th
Îles-de-la-Madeleine	n.c.				
Jacques-Cartier	Thomas Ezzy	M	228	0.68	5th
Jeanne-Mance	n.c.				
Jean-Talon	Gilles Fiset	M	977	3.22	3rd
Johnson	Jean-Marie Fréchette	M	185	0.72	7th
Joliette	n.c.				
Jonquière	Maurice Bilodeau	M	1,774	5.75	3rd
Kamouraska-Témiscouata	n.c.				
Labelle	n.c.				
Lac-Saint-Jean	n.c.				
LaFontaine	Destin Jean-Pierre	M	763	2.88	3rd
La Peltrie	Claude Pelletier	M	2,567	6.52	3rd
La Pinière	Luis Martinez	M	1,237	4.19	3rd
Laporte	Bruce Katz	M	377	1.27	5th
Laprairie	n.c.				
L'Assomption	n.c.				
Laurier	Victor Bilodeau	M	777	3.87	4th
Laval-des-Rapides	n.c.				
Laviolette	n.c.				
Les Chutes-de-la-Chaudière	Dany Gravel	M	1,505	4.64	3rd
Lévis	n.c.				
Limoilou	Jean-François Sirois	M	645	2.28	4th
Lotbinière	Allen Guilbert	M	616	2.76	3rd
Louis-Hébert	Normand Beauregard	M	584	1.88	4th
Marguerite-Bourgeoys	n.c.				
Marie-Victorin	n.c.				
Marquette	Myriam Sainson	F	569	2.07	4th
Maskinongé	n.c.				
Masson	Richard Morin	M	611	1.85	4th
Matane	n.c.				
Matapédia	n.c.				
Mégantic-Compton	n.c.				
Mercier	Robert Saint-Louis	M	567	2.42	4th
Mille-Îles	n.c.				
Montmagny-L'Islet	n.c.				
Montmorency	Germaine Poirier	F	1,726	5.01	3rd
Mont-Royal	John Philip Penner	M	229	1.13	5th
Nelligan	Jean-Paul Rioux	M	664	1.92	4th
Nicolet-Yamaska	n.c.				
Notre-Dame-de-Grâce	Michel Decoste	M	388	1.43	5th
Orford	Denis Boissé	M	861	2.87	4th
Outremont	Jean-Guy Loranger	M	649	2.75	4th
Papineau	n.c.				
Pointe-aux-Trembles	n.c.				
Pontiac	Michael Coghlan	M	956	4.68	4th
Portneuf	n.c.				
Prévost	n.c.				
Richelieu	n.c.				
Richmond	n.c.				
Rimouski	n.c.				
Rivière-du-Loup	n.c.				
Robert-Baldwin	n.c.				
Roberval	n.c.				
Rosemont	Pierre Dion	M	620	2.22	3rd
Notes: Pierre Dion received 620 votes (2.22%), finishing third against Liberal incumbent Guy Rivard.
Rousseau	n.c.				
Rouyn-Noranda–Témiscamingue	n.c.				
Saguenay	n.c.				
Sainte-Anne	Suzy Potvin	F	218	0.99	5th
Sainte-Marie–Saint-Jacques	Denis Plante	M	332	1.19	4th
Saint-François	Peter Julian	M	884	3.07	4th
Saint-Henri	Jean-Pierre Fafard	M	530	2.32	4th
Saint-Hyacinthe	Marie-Paule Chevrette	F	1,381	4.23	3rd
Saint-Jean	Mariette Boudreault	F	1,463	4.04	3rd
Saint-Laurent	Daniel Sabbah	M	248	0.83	5th
Saint-Louis	Kathleen Parewick	F	457	2.05	5th
Saint-Maurice	n.c.				
Salaberry-Soulanges	n.c.				
Sauvé	n.c.				
Shefford	n.c.				
Sherbrooke	Mario Mercier	M	521	1.83	4th
Taillon	Marc Vachon	M	508	1.50	4th
Taschereau	Hélène Huard	F	1,258	6.24	3rd
Terrebonne	n.c.				
Trois-Rivières	Donald Matthew Molnar	M	413	1.48	3rd
Ungava	n.c.				
Vachon	Réjean Benoit	M	620	1.82	5th
Vanier	Ysabel Provencher	F	1,131	3.68	3rd
Vaudreuil	n.c.				
Verchères	n.c.				
Verdun	Jean-François Moisan	M	387	1.80	5th
Notes: Jean-François Moisan, an environmental activist, served on the executive of Montreal's municipal Democratic Coalition party in the early 1990s. He later ran as a candidate of Gérald Tremblay's Montreal Island Citizens Union in the 2001 municipal election and was a candidate for school trustee in 2003. Electoral record: Election / Division / Party / Votes / % / Place / Winner; 1989 provincial / Verdun / New Democratic Party / 387 / 1.80 / 5/7 / Henri-François Gautrin, Liberal; 2001 Montreal municipal / Council, Hochelaga district / Montreal Island Citizens Union / 1,760 / 26.52 / 2/3 / Luc Larivée, Vision Montreal; 2003 Montreal school commission / Commission scolaire de Montréal election, District 10 / Mouvement pour une école moderne et ouverte / 595 / 47.04 / 2/2 / Lyn Thériault, Collectif pour la réussite et l'épanouissement de l'enfant
Viau	Raymond Gagnon	M	954	4.20	3rd
Viger					
Vimont	Jocelyn Roy	M	1,138	3.13	3rd
Westmount	Rebecca Elbourne	F	430	1.99	5th
