= Jacqueline Montpetit =

Jacqueline Montpetit is a politician in Montreal, Quebec, Canada. She served on the Montreal city council from 2001 to 2009 and was borough mayor of Le Sud-Ouest. Montpetit has also served as a school commissioner.

== Early life and career ==
Montpetit has a Bachelor of Arts degree in Sociology from the Université Laval. She worked at the Carrefour d'éducation populaire de Pointe-Saint-Charles from 1971 to 1974 and, after raising a family, oversaw the same organization from 1987 to 1990.

== School commissioner ==
Montpetit was elected to the Montreal Catholic School Commission in 1994 as a candidate of the secular and progressive Mouvement pour une école moderne et ouverte (MÉMO). Although MÉMO won more seats than any other party in this election, they fell short of a majority, and the governing Regroupement scolaire confessionnel (RSC) was able to remain in office with support from a smaller party. Montpetit served for the next four years as a member of the opposition.

Quebec's denominational school boards were replaced in 1998 by boards centered on language, and Montpetit was elected to the new Commission scolaire de Montréal in the elections of June 1998. MÉMO won a majority of commission seats in this election and was able to form a new administration, although it subsequently lost its majority when some of its elected members left the party to serve as independents. Montpetit, who remained with MÉMO, continued to serve as a commissioner after her election to city council.

Throughout her time as a school commissioner, Montpetit was involved in efforts to provide a proper schoolyard space for the École Charles-Lemoyne, in her division. She did not seek re-election in 2003.

== City councillor and borough mayor ==
Montpetit was elected to the Montreal city council in the 2001 municipal election as a Vision Montreal candidate in Point-Saint-Charles. Vision Montreal lost this election to Gérald Tremblay's Montreal Island Citizens Union (MICU), and Montpetit initially served as an opposition member.

By virtue of her position on city council, Montpetit also served on the local Sud-Ouest borough council. She was chosen as its chair following the 2001 election, becoming one of the few Vision Montreal councillors in this time to chair a borough council. All borough council chairs in Montreal were re-designated as "borough mayors" in 2004.

In 2002, Montpetit argued that the Tremblay administration was underfunding Montreal's older communities relative to newly amalgamated suburban wards, adding that her area was having difficulty paying for essential maintenance.

During her first term as borough mayor, Montpetit approved funding for an avant-garde sculpture in Marguerite Bourgeoys Park, commemorating the arrival of Marguerite Bourgeoys in Montreal in 1653. After some local residents indicated their disapproval of the statue, Montpetit noted, "There is always a shock with modern art but if people take the time to appreciate it they will come to see this is good."

By 2004, Montpetit and fellow Vision Montreal city councillor Robert Bousquet were often engaging in heated battles at the borough council level. Montpetit left Vision Montreal to join MICU in June 2005, and she was narrowly re-elected as borough mayor in the 2005 municipal election over Bousquet, who ran as Vision's candidate. Early reports actually showed Bousquet elected by seventy-five votes, but the final returns after a recount showed Montpetit elected by thirty-eight. The candidates ran on similar platforms: both promoted more social housing and condominium development for the region. As a borough mayor, Montpetit also continued to serve on city council.

Montpetit helped oversee two real estate development projects in the Griffintown neighbourhood during her second term, although these projects had run into difficulties by 2009. She also helped facilitate a revitalization project for the Lachine Canal, and in September 2009 she announced plans to rename Campbell-Centre Park in the Little Burgundy neighbourhood after jazz legend Oscar Peterson, who had grown up in the area. She opposed a plan to permit frontal terraces on bars and restaurants along Monk Boulevard.

Montpetit did not seek re-election in 2009.

== Electoral record ==
=== City councillor ===
2005 Montreal municipal election results: Mayor, Borough of Le Sud-Ouest
| Party | Candidate | Votes | % |
|---|---|---|---|
| Montreal Island Citizens Union | Jacqueline Montpetit (incumbent) | 5,939 | 40.40 |
| Vision Montreal | Robert Bousquet | 5,901 | 40.14 |
| Projet Montréal | Pierre M. Valiquette | 1,565 | 10.64 |
| ÉV-M | Daniel Tremblay | 1,041 | 7.08 |
| Independent | Glenmore Browne | 256 | 1.74 |
| Total votes | | 14,702 | 100 |
Source City of Montreal official results (in French), City of Montreal.

2001 Montreal municipal election: Councillor, Point-Saint-Charles
| Party | Candidate | Votes | % |
|---|---|---|---|
| Vision Montreal | Jacqueline Montpetit | 2,995 | 50.16 |
| Montreal Island Citizens Union | René Labrosse | 1,490 | 24.95 |
| Independent | Richard Wafer | 1,365 | 22.86 |
| Independent | Lionel Petit | 121 | 2.03 |
| Total valid votes | | 5,971 | 100 |
Source: Election results, 1833-2005 (in French), City of Montreal.

=== School trustee ===
1998 Commission scolaire de Montréal election: Trustee, District Nineteen
| Party | Candidate | Votes | % |
|---|---|---|---|
| Mouvement pour une école moderne et ouverte | Jacqueline Montpetit | 1,156 | 64.26 |
| Regroupement scolaire confessionnel | Mario Langlois | 643 | 35.74 |
| Total votes | | 1,799 | 100 |
Source Commission scolaire de Montréal — 06-02 (Election Results, 1998), Le Directeur général des élections du Québec.

1994 Montreal Catholic School Commission election: Trustee, District Two
| Party | Candidate | Votes | % |
|---|---|---|---|
| Mouvement pour une école moderne et ouverte | Jacqueline Montpetit | elected | |
Source "List of winners in Montreal Island board elections," Montreal Gazette, 21 November 1994, A6.
