= Lyn Thériault =

Montreal City Councillor for Louis-Riel
- In office 2009–2013
- Preceded by: Richer Dompierre
- Succeeded by: Karine Boivin Roy
- In office 2001–2005
- Preceded by: Jacques Charbonneau
- Succeeded by: Richer Dompierre

Chair of the Vision Montreal caucus
- Incumbent
- Assumed office 2012
- Preceded by: Benoit Dorais

Member of the Montreal Executive Committee responsible for social and community development, family, and seniors
- In office 2009–2011
- Preceded by: Mary Deros
- Succeeded by: Jocelyn Ann Campbell

Borough mayor of Mercier–Hochelaga-Maisonneuve
- In office 2005–2009
- Preceded by: Ivon Le Duc
- Succeeded by: Réal Ménard

Member of the Commission scolaire de Montréal, Ward Ten
- In office 1998–2007
- Preceded by: position created
- Succeeded by: Jean-Denis Dufort

Personal details
- Party: Vision Montreal

Lyn Thériault, formerly known as Lyn Faust, is a politician in Montreal, Quebec, Canada. She has served on the Montreal city council since 2001 as a member of the Vision Montreal party. She was also an elected member of the Commission scolaire de Montréal from 1998 to 2007.

Thériault was the borough mayor of Mercier–Hochelaga-Maisonneuve from 2005 to 2009 and was a member of the Montreal executive committee (i.e., the municipal cabinet) from 2009 to 2011.

== Private career ==
Thériault has held administrative positions with the Fédération des comités de parents de la province de Québec, the Fédération des comités de parents de l'Île de Montréal, and the Association canadienne d'éducation de la langue français. She served as a parent school commissioner on the Montreal Catholic School Commission in 1993–94. She has also been a member of Montreal's Board of Trade and Chamber of Commerce and has coordinated events such as the Montreal Chamber Music Festival.

== School commissioner ==
Thériault was elected to the Commission scolaire de Montréal in the 1998 elections as a candidate of the conservative Regroupement scolaire confessionnel (RSC). The RSC was defeated in this election but later formed a de facto majority on council in alliance with five defectors from the governing Mouvement pour une école moderne et ouverte (MÉMO).

Thériault later became a founding member of the Collectif pour la réussite et l'épanouissement de l'enfant (CRÉE), a successor party to the RSC. In March 2003, she was appointed to the commission's executive. She was re-elected as a CRÉE candidate in the 2003 elections, in which MÉMO won a landslide majority. After serving in opposition for the next four years, she did not seek re-election in 2007.

== City councillor ==
Thériault was first elected to the Montreal city council in the 2001 municipal election for the east-end division of Louis-Riel. Gérald Tremblay's Montreal Island Citizens Union (MICU) won a majority in this election, and Thériault served as a member of the opposition. By virtue of her position on city council, she also served on the Mercier–Hochelaga-Maisonneuve borough council.

=== Borough mayor ===
Thériault was elected as borough mayor of Mercier–Hochelaga-Maisonneuve in the 2005 municipal election, defeating Pierre Bélanger, a former Parti Québécois (PQ) cabinet minister who ran for MICU. As a borough mayor, she also continued to serve on city council. Gérald Tremblay was re-elected as mayor of Montreal in this election, and MICU won another majority on the Montreal city council. In November 2005, Tremblay appointed Thériault as one of two opposition members on a fifteen-member island council responsible for services such as public transit and the police.

In 2006, Thériault argued that Montreal's formula for determining borough budgets discriminated against her area of the city. She later opposed a plan to rename Montreal's Park Avenue and Bleury Street after former Quebec premier Robert Bourassa, and in early 2007 she criticized a municipal plan to grant a ten-year untendered contract for a non-profit organization to oversee Montreal's recyclable waste.

In the buildup to the 2009 municipal election, Thériault lost her bid for renomination as Vision Montreal's borough mayor candidate to Réal Ménard, a Bloc Québécois (BQ) member of the House of Commons of Canada. She instead ran for and was re-elected to city council for the Louis-Riel division, defeating Union Montreal incumbent Richer Dompierre. She continues to serve on the borough council.

=== Municipal executive ===
Gérald Tremblay was re-elected to a third term as mayor of Montreal in the 2009 election, and his Union Montreal party again won a majority of seats on council. After the election, Tremblay broke with tradition by appointing members of opposition parties to the Montreal executive committee. Thériault was chosen as Vision Montreal's representative, with responsibility for social and community development, family, and seniors.

Reports from the Montreal Gazette indicate that the presence of opposition members in Tremblay's cabinet did not change the adversarial nature of Montreal municipal politics. Thériault absented herself when Vision Montreal voted against Tremblay's 2010 budget.

Tremblay removed Thériault from the executive committee on March 22, 2011, after she and sixteen other Vision Montreal councillors were cited by Quebec's chief electoral officer for illegal loan guarantees in the 2009 election. Vision Montreal contended that the guarantees were made in error and that the party had itself raised the matter with Quebec election officials. Tremblay said that Thériault had performed well on the executive, but that he could not keep her in government following the citation.

=== Opposition councillor ===
Thériault was elected as president of the Vision Montreal caucus in December 2012.

== Provincial politics ==
Thériault ran as a Quebec Liberal Party candidate in a provincial by-election in Bourget in 2008, centring her campaign around what she described as "a pro-family theme." She was defeated by Parti Québécois candidate Maka Kotto.

== Electoral record ==
=== Municipal ===
2013 Montreal municipal election: City Councillor, Louis Riel
Party	Candidate	Votes	%	±%
Équipe Denis Coderre	Karine Boivin Roy	3,327	34.26	new
Coalition Montréal	Lyn Thériault	2,786	28.50	new
Projet Montréal	Michel Bouchard	2,754	28.36	+2.63
Intégrité Montréal	Sonia Robert	863	8.89	new
Total valid votes/expense limit		9,712	95.33	
Total rejected ballots		476	4.67	+1.27
Turnout		10,188	46.24	+3.13
Eligible voters		22,032	–	–

2009 Montreal municipal election: City Councillor, Louis Riel
Party	Candidate	Votes	%	±%
Vision Montreal	Lyn Thériault	3,784	39.95	-5.41
Union Montreal	Richer Dompierre	2,926	30.89	-13.87
Projet Montréal	Michel Bouchard	2,437	25.73	+15.85
Independent	Steve Lamer	255	2.69	
Independent	Kristian-Andrew Solarik	69	0.73	
Total valid votes/expense limit		9,471	96.60	
Total rejected ballots		333	3.40	N/A
Turnout		9,804	43.11	
Eligible voters		22,743	–	–

2005 Montreal municipal election: Borough mayor, Mercier–Hochelaga-Maisonneuve
Party	Candidate	Votes	%	±%
Vision Montreal	Lyn Thériault Faust (incumbent councillor)	15,130	48.07	
Citizens Union	Pierre Bélanger	13,079	41.56	
Projet Montréal	Éric Alan Caldwell	3,263	10.37	
Total valid votes		31,472	100	
Source: City of Montreal official results (in French), City of Montreal.

2001 Montreal municipal election: Councillor, Louis-Riel
Party	Candidate	Votes	%
Vision Montreal	Lyn Faust	6,387	69.25
Montreal Island Citizens Union	Gilles Marette	2,836	30.75
Total valid votes		9,223	100
Source: Election results, 1833-2005 (in French), City of Montreal.

=== Provincial ===
Quebec provincial by-election, May 12, 2008: Bourget
Party	Candidate	Votes	%	±%
Parti Québécois	Maka Kotto	6,575	40.66	−0.60
Liberal	Lyn Thériault	5,161	31.92	+9.07
Green	Scott McKay	1,839	11.37	+3.28
Action démocratique	Denis Mondor	1,520	9.40	−13.61
Québec solidaire	Gaétan Legault	700	4.33	+0.14
Parti indépendantiste	Richard Gervais	376	2.33	–
Total valid votes		16,171	99.01	–
Total rejected ballots		162	0.99	–
Turnout		16,333	34.55	−35.34
Electors on the lists		47,276	–	–
Source: Official Results, Le Directeur général des élections du Québec.

=== School trustee ===
2003 Commission scolaire de Montréal election results: Trustee, District Ten
Party	Candidate	Votes	%
Collectif pour la réussite et l'épanouissement de l'enfant	(x)Lyn Faust	670	52.96
Mouvement pour une école moderne et ouverte	Jean-François Moisan	595	47.04
Total votes		1,265	100.00
Source ÉLECTIONS SCOLAIRES DU 16 NOVEMBRE 2003, Commission scolaire de Montréal.

1998 Commission scolaire de Montréal election results: Trustee, District Ten
Party	Candidate	Votes	%
Regroupement scolaire confessionnel	Lyn Faust	1,483	53.91
Mouvement pour une école moderne et ouverte	Linda Tassile	1,268	46.09
Total votes		2,751	100
Source Commission scolaire de Montréal — 06-02 (Election Results, 1998), Le Directeur général des élections du Québec.
