= Denis Mondor =

Denis Mondor is a judge and former high-profile lawyer in the Canadian province of Quebec.

== Lawyer ==
Mondor holds a Bachelor of Civil Law degree from the Université du Québec à Montréal and was admitted to the Bar of Quebec in 1984. He was a criminal lawyer and administrator prior to his appointment to the bench. He served as treasurer of the Montreal Defence Lawyers' Association from 1990 to 1999 and was a spokesperson for this organization during a December 1996 defense lawyers' strike, which was called to protest the Quebec government's proposed changes to divorce law and cuts to legal aide. He later served as the association's president in 2002–03.

Mondor served on the council of the Bar of Montreal in 2001–03 and was president (batonnier) of the Bar of Quebec in 2004–05. He met with legal aid lawyers agitating for a new collective agreement December 2004, in what was described as a gesture of solidarity. He later decried a shortage of new legal stenographers in the province.

In March 2005, Mondor stated that the Bar of Quebec was strongly opposed to the use of religious law in private arbitration. He argued that the laws of Quebec and Canada "prohibit the use of arbitration in realms affecting the fundamental rights of individuals, including family law".

== Political candidate ==
Mondor ran as an Action démocratique du Québec (ADQ) candidate in a by-election in the Montreal division of Bourget in 2008. During the campaign, he defended his party's controversial proposal to freeze the number of new immigrants permitted into the province. Considered a star candidate, he nonetheless finished a distant fourth place, a result Montreal Gazette writer Philip Authier described as "disastrous" for the party.

== Judge ==
Mondor was appointed to the Court of Quebec's criminal and penal division in Montreal on November 16, 2011.

In July 2012, he granted an unconditional discharge to a low-level cannabis dealer who had been apprehended by accident during an attempted sting on a crack dealer in the Rivière des Prairies area. Noting that the accused had turned his life around since the arrest, Mondor said that it would not be in society's interest to burden him with a criminal record.

== Electoral record ==
Quebec provincial by-election, May 12, 2008: Bourget
Party	Candidate	Votes	%	±%
Parti Québécois	Maka Kotto	6,575	40.66	−0.60
Liberal	Lyn Thériault	5,161	31.92	+9.07
Green	Scott McKay	1,839	11.37	+3.28
Action démocratique	Denis Mondor	1,520	9.40	−13.61
Québec solidaire	Gaétan Legault	700	4.33	+0.14
Parti indépendantiste	Richard Gervais	376	2.33	–
Total valid votes		16,171	99.01	–
Total rejected ballots		162	0.99	–
Turnout		16,333	34.55	−35.34
Electors on the lists		47,276	–	–
Source: Official Results, Le Directeur général des élections du Québec.
