= Richard Campeau =

Richard Campeau may refer to:

- Richard Campeau (politician), Canadian politician
- Rychard Campeau, Canadian ice hockey player
