= Paul St-Pierre Plamondon =

Premier of Quebec since 2026

Paul St-Pierre Plamondon MNA
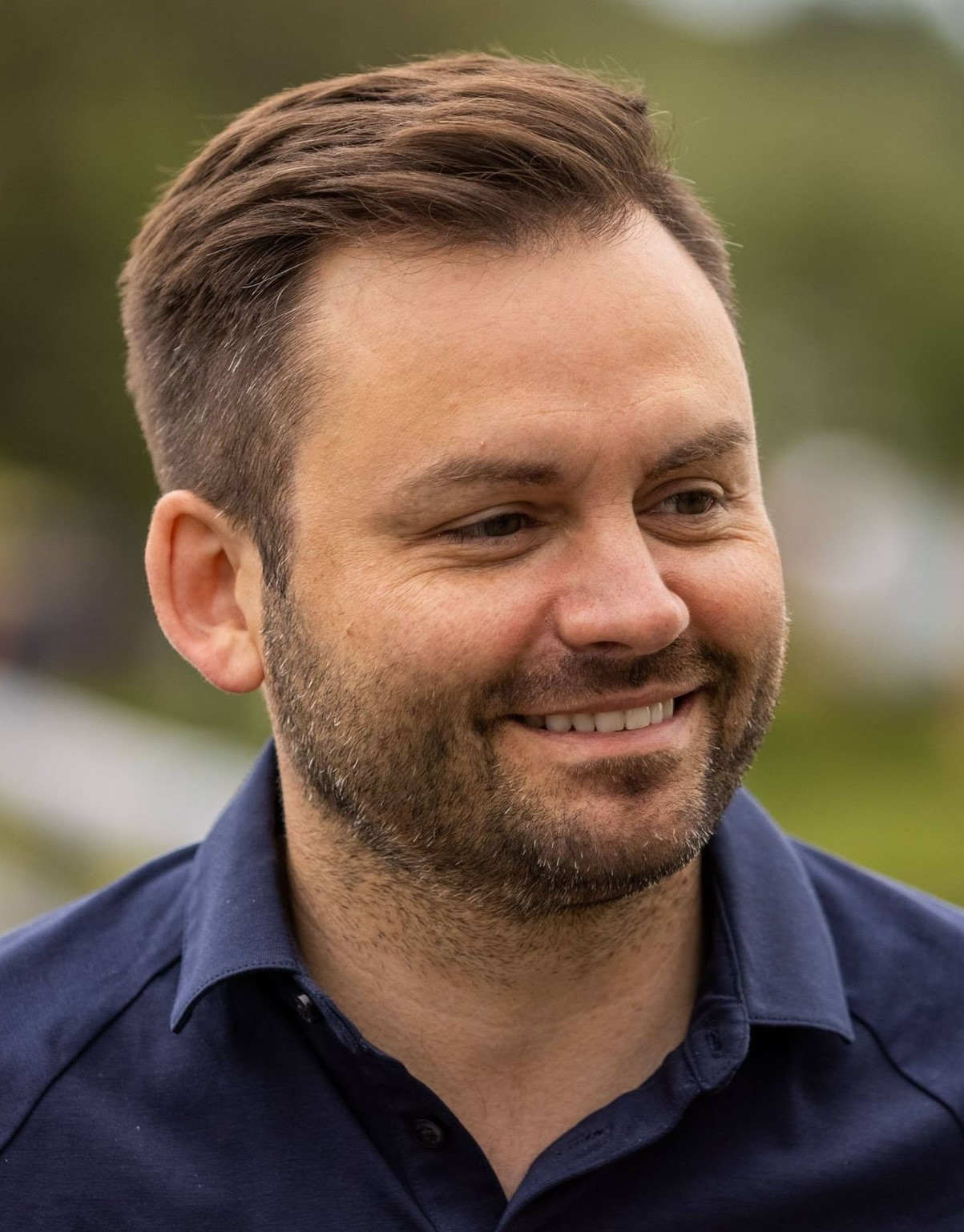
- St-Pierre Plamondon in 2021

34th Premier of Quebec
- Incumbent
- Assumed office October 21, 2026
- Monarch: Charles III
- Lieutenant Governor: Manon Jeannotte
- Deputy: Catherine Gentilcore
- Preceded by: Christine Fréchette

Leader of the Parti Québécois
- Incumbent
- Assumed office October 9, 2020
- Preceded by: Pascal Bérubé (interim)

Member of the National Assembly for Camille-Laurin
- Incumbent
- Assumed office October 3, 2022
- Preceded by: Richard Campeau

Personal details
- Born: February 17, 1977 (age 49) Trois-Rivières, Quebec, Canada
- Party: Parti Québécois (provincial)
- Other political affiliations: Bloc Québécois (federal)
- Spouse: Alexandra Tremblay
- Children: 3
- Education: McGill University (BCL, LLB); Nuffield College, Oxford (MBA)

Paul St-Pierre Plamondon (Note: French: [pɔl sɛ̃ pjɛʁ plamɔ̃dɔ̃]) (born February 17, 1977), commonly known by his initials PSPP, is a Canadian politician, lawyer, and media personality who has served as the 34th premier of Quebec since 2026 and as leader of the Parti Québécois since 2020. A member of the National Assembly (MNA), he has represented the electoral district of Camille-Laurin since 2022.

== Early life and education ==
St-Pierre Plamondon was born on February 17, 1977, to Louise St-Pierre and Jacques Plamondon, former director general of the Quebec Table Tennis Federation. His grandfather, Paul-Henri Plamondon, was president of the Quebec City Chamber of Commerce.

St-Pierre Plamondon began his college studies at Collège André-Grasset and graduated in 1997. He holds bachelor's degrees in Civil Law (BCL) and Common Law (LLB) from McGill University (2001), an MBA from Nuffield College, Oxford (2006), and a Certificate in International Law from Lund University (2001).

In 2003, he was a volunteer prosecutor for the Permanent Assembly of Human Rights in Sucre, Bolivia. In 2005, he worked with the North Atlantic Treaty Organization (NATO) in Belgium. St-Pierre Plamondon was also a lawyer in the litigation department of Stikeman Elliott, a national law firm.

In 2009, he joined the Delegatus law firm as vice-president and shareholder of the study. St-Pierre Plamondon was awarded Lawyer of the Year in 2010, in the pro bono category, at the annual conference of the Young Bar of Montreal to celebrate the "leaders of tomorrow".

== Early career ==
In 2007, he co-founded Génération d'idées, a nonprofit thinking group whose mission is to engage young people from 20 to 35 in public debate by inviting them to express themselves on social themes in the various platforms of Génération d'idées. In 2009, with the aim of promoting Génération d'idées and to sound out the opinion of Québec's Generation Y, St-Pierre Plamondon visited 19 Québec cities in 63 days and gathered the thoughts of 500 young people. Following that exercise, he published the essay Des jeunes et l'avenir du Québec: les rêveries d'un promeneur solitaire.

In 2011, he began as co-host of the radio show Génératrice on Radio-Canada's Première Chaîne. In October 2011, the Génération d'idées group planted more than 250 brooms in front of the National Assembly in Québec City and stepped up public interventions to call for a public inquiry into the construction industry in Québec. St-Pierre Plamondon's interventions in favour of this commission of inquiry led Radio-Canada to request that he be removed from the program as a co-host.

In 2012, he defended students on walkout in front of the courts and participated in the demonstration of lawyers against Bill 78 (now Bill 12). In September 2013, he resigned as president of Génération d'idées. In February 2014, St-Pierre Plamondon became a journalist for Les Affaires newspaper.

In October 2014, he published a second essay entitled Les Orphelins politiques: plaidoyer pour un renouveau du paysage politique québécois, in which he advocated for the emergence of a new movement that would fill the void felt by several political orphans. He is the author of several open letters and media interventions on various current issues, including politics.

== Political career ==
=== Political beginnings ===
In 2016, St-Pierre Plamondon was thinking of creating a new centre-left, nationalist but not separatist political party, but a friend suggested that he run for the Parti Québécois (PQ) in order to use it as a vehicle for his political career. St-Pierre Plamondon was a candidate in the 2016 Parti Québécois leadership race, finishing fourth with 6.84% support. One of his main commitments during this race was to reconnect the party with all Québécois people. St-Pierre Plamondon opposed holding a referendum on sovereignty during a PQ government's first mandate. After months following his bid, he publicly clashed with conservative sovereigntist Mathieu Bock-Côté on whether systemic racism was a longstanding issue in Quebec.

On October 23, 2016, the leader of the PQ, Jean-François Lisée, announced the appointment of St-Pierre Plamondon to the position of special advisor to the leader. In this role, St-Pierre Plamondon recommended consulting the people of Québec on the revival of the party and drafting, at the end of this process, a report and recommendations on the relaunch of the PQ. The open consultation was mostly aimed at the business community, particularly entrepreneurs and other professionals, members of Québec's minority groups, and those under the age of 40. After 162 consultations with more than 3,600 people, he tabled a report with 156 recommendations in April 2017. Within the report, it stated a "refocus on an inclusive nationalism," and to "redefine nationalism to distance it from populism and intolerance." At the PQ National Congress in September 2017, 44 recommendations were accepted by the PQ National Executive Council. The majority of the other recommendations were adopted at the extraordinary PQ convention in Trois-Rivières in November 2019.

As the candidate for the Parti Québécois in Prévost in the 2018 Quebec general election, St-Pierre Plamondon faced former Quebec Liberal Party minister Marguerite Blais, who now represented the Coalition Avenir Québec. During this local election campaign, St-Pierre Plamondon prioritized the environment, the quality of public services and support for families. Presented as a star candidate, he was defeated by Marguerite Blais.

=== Leader of the Parti Québécois (2020–present) ===
==== 42nd Quebec Legislature (2020–2022) ====
On January 28, 2020, he officially announced his candidacy for the leadership of the Parti Québécois. He won the leadership race on October 9, 2020, with 56% of the vote in the third round. St-Pierre Plamondon this time unlike in 2016, pledged to hold a sovereignty referendum in the first mandate of a PQ government.

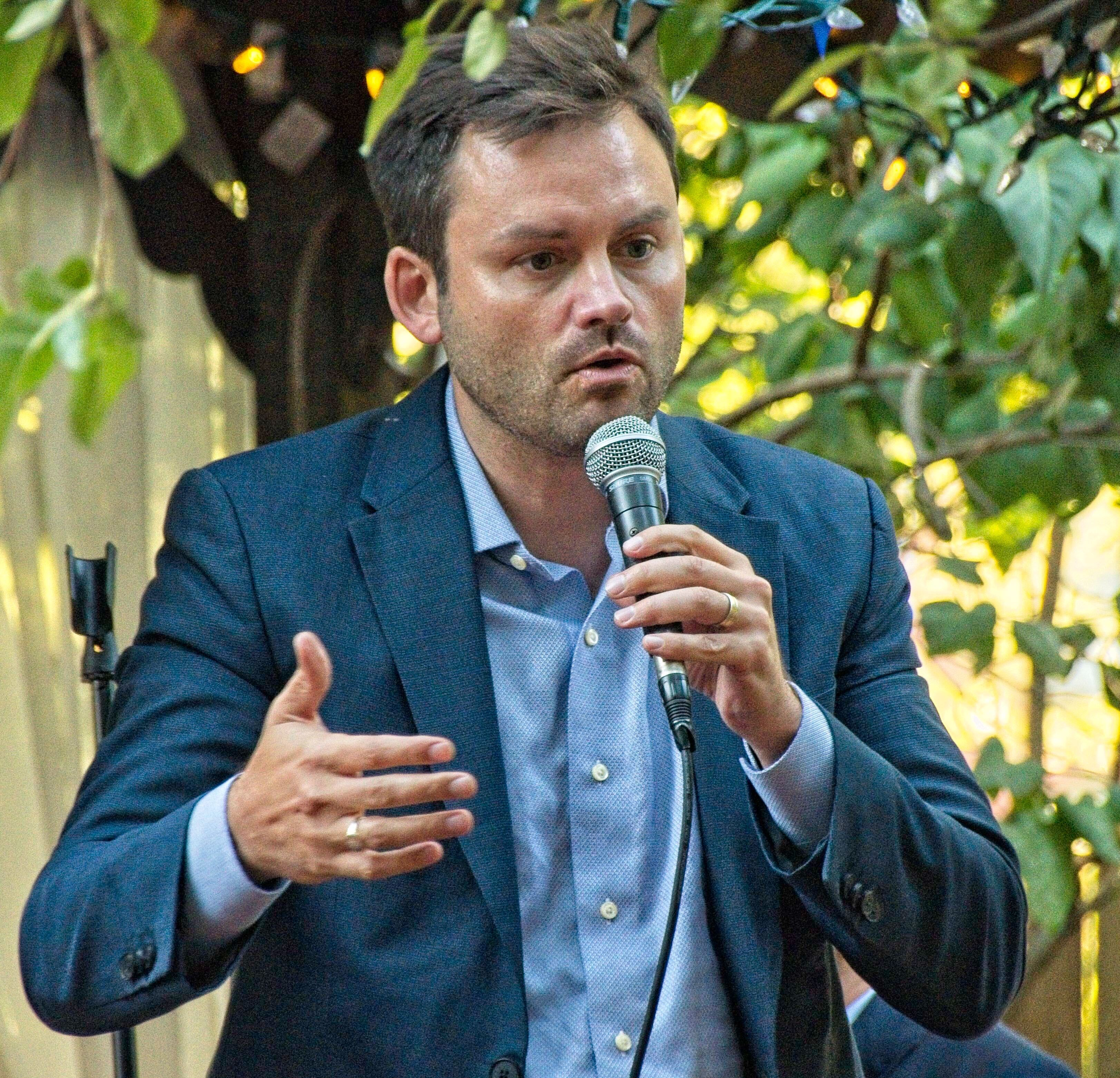
Paul St-Pierre Plamondon in 2020

In early 2022, he announced that he would be a candidate in the riding of Camille-Laurin, in Montreal. On election night, he defeated Coalition Avenir Québec MNA Richard Campeau, aided by the lack of a Québec solidaire candidate in the riding.

During the 2022 Quebec general election, he and Gabriel Nadeau-Dubois from Québec solidaire faced some controversy for their use of the word nègre while they discussed academic freedom in schools and universities during a televised debate. The 2022 provincial election saw even further erosion and an unprecedented loss of support for the Parti Québécois. Not only did the party once again not form government or the official opposition, but it was reduced to its smallest-ever presence in the legislature, with only three seats won. The previous low was its second election, in 1973, where the party won six seats. The PQ lost its official party status and came in a distant fourth place. It won only 14 percent of the vote, its lowest ever. The movement of most voter support over to the CAQ and other nationalist parties put into question the party's relevance and its ability to survive in future.

==== 43rd Quebec Legislature (2022–2026) ====
Plamondon and the PQ said after the general election in 2022 that they would not take the Oath of Allegiance upon attempting to take their seats in the National Assembly of Quebec, arguing, "you can't serve two masters at the same time." In response, the President of the National Assembly, François Paradis, asserted that the PQ MNAs were required to recite the oath or risk expulsion from the legislature. On 1 December 2022, PQ MNAs continued to refuse and were stopped from entering the legislature. The Executive Council, occupied by the Coalition Avenir Québec party, headed by François Legault, thereafter tabled a bill that purported to amend the constitution of Canada so as to add to Section 128 of the Constitution Act, 1867, the clause requiring the Oath of Allegiance for legislators, a statement that the section does not apply to Quebec. That bill passed the assembly with unanimous consent on 6 December 2022. It remains, unclear if the law has any effect.

After the 2022 provincial election, the PQ held a leadership confidence vote in March 2023. St-Pierre Plamondon broke the record for the PQ votes of confidence, with 98.51% support. After the 2022 election, St-Pierre Plamondon shifted the PQ rightward, away from the progressive legacy of Premiers René Lévesque, Jacques Parizeau, Lucien Bouchard and Pauline Marois. The PQ started to see an increase in its support in the polls, polling as the second-largest party but still behind the CAQ. On October 2, 2023, the PQ won its fourth seat with its win in the 2023 Jean-Talon provincial by-election, with Pascal Paradis being elected MNA. Since November 2023, the PQ has been polling as the largest party, with support over 30%. Their polling has reportedly been affected by the 2025 United States trade war with Canada and Mexico.

St-Pierre Plamondon has been described as scapegoating immigrants for problems caused by the Quebec government, in contrast to former PQ immigration minister Gerald Godin, who saw immigrants as the future of Quebec's sovereigntist movement. In 2024, St-Pierre Plamondon called for a referendum on immigration. He also agreed with American president Donald Trump's comment that immigrants from Canada were bringing fentanyl into the US. On September 11, 2025, a letter was published in La Presse, which included former PQ cabinet minister Louise Harel as one of the signatories, as a response to an advertisement that the PQ put out on immigration, stating it is a complex topic and the public should not be misled on it. Plamondon called the letter a form of intimidation and referred to the signatories as part of the radical left.

St-Pierre Plamondon was also critical of former Quebec City mayor Régis Labeaume, who wrote in La Presse that he was using inflammatory rhetoric to win over the "white francophone" vote, by demanding that La Presse give him a column so that he can refute what he saw as the "defamatory allegations", which the paper rejected. Former Montreal Gazette journalist Christopher Curtis revealed that during the 2020 leadership race, St-Pierre Plamondon called Curtis, who never gave out his phone number, and demanded that he take down a tweet comparing Plamondon's immigration views to the French far-right. In June 2026, St-Pierre Plamondon told the Montreal Chamber of Commerce that he would never scapegoat immigrants for decisions made by policymakers. During an interview with Le Devoir, during the 2026 Quebec Election, he blamed the media and his political opponents for the deterioration of his image among immigrants.

On November 28, 2024, it was reported by Noovo Info that members of the sovereigntist identarian group Nouvelle alliance were participating in the meetings of the PQ and the Bloc Québécois. St-Pierre Plamondon stated that his party welcomed those in the far-right and far-left as long as they respect their code of ethics.

On March 17, 2025, the PQ won its fifth seat with its win in the 2025 Terrebonne provincial by-election, with Catherine Gentilcore being elected MNA. On August 11, 2025, the PQ won its sixth seat with its win in the 2025 Arthabaska provincial by-election, with Alex Boissonneault being elected MNA. After their Arthabaska victory, St-Pierre Plamondon welcomed support from People's Party of Canada leader Maxime Bernier for a third referendum. Former PQ premier Lucien Bouchard was critical of Plamondon's plan for a third referendum during his first term and advised that he should reconsider his plan. Plamondon rejected Bouchard's comment, pointing out that he is still a member of the party. Plamondon has also stated that if a sovereignty referendum were successful, Quebec would establish its own currency within a decade after the vote. The PQ would also consider establishing an independent commission to evaluate creating its own currency, keeping the Canadian dollar, or adopting the American dollar.

On September 3, 2025, St-Pierre Plamondon expressed support for the Alberta separatism movement. After the Financial Times revealed in 2026 that Alberta separatists had met with the U.S. State Department, he revealed that in September he also met with the leaders of the Alberta Prosperity Project, a separatist group, by establishing a positive relationship with them and was open to further cooperation.

In December 2025, St-Pierre Plamondon declared on social media that part of Quebec's cultural community lacked loyalty after representatives from several cultural associations welcomed Marc Miller's appointment as federal minister of Canadian Identity and Culture. Laurent Dubois, director general of the Society of Radio, Television and Film Authors, one of representatives that welcomed Miller appointment, was critical of Plamondon's comment by stating that they welcomed Miller since their union members are affected by two federal laws, the Broadcasting Act and the Copyright Act. Artists such as screenwriter Eric K. Boulianne and director Rafaël Ouellet also criticized Plamondon's condemnation of Miller by sharing a screenshot of him congratulating Donald Trump on his victory in November 2024. Sovereignist songwriter Paul Piche felt that Plamondon made a mistake and should apologize for his comment, while filmmaker Louis Bélanger felt that Plamondon damaged the historical relationship between minority groups and the party. The following Sunday, St-Pierre Plamondon tempered his comments while appearing on Tout le monde en parle.

In February 2026, his party won the 2026 Chicoutimi provincial by-election, with Marie-Karlynn Laflamme becoming the PQ's seventh MNA. After the Chicoutimi by-election, St-Pierre Plamondon admitted it was possible that he would wait for the end of Trump's term in office before holding a referendum; he confirmed this in an announcement in August. A month later, he later admitted that the war on Iran would have an impact on the separatist program, but believed that Quebec independence was necessary. Plamondon later said even though he would not commit to a tax cut, an independent Quebec may promise lower taxes and higher pension benefits. The pro-independence organization Organisations unies pour l'indépendance Québec released a report on how the PQ leadership created a lack of inclusivity within the separatism movement. Despite former PQ cabinet minister Louise Harel and Louise Beaudoin recommending that he accept the findings, St-Pierre Plamondon stated that he was not concerned by the report. On September 9, 2026, St-Pierre Plamondon pledged to hold a referendum on Quebec sovereignty even if the PQ did not win a majority government.

On August 9, 2026, St-Pierre Plamondon pledged to abolish Santé Québec. On September 30, 2026, he suggested that he would keep part of it as a division within the Ministry of Health. During the last week of the 2026 Quebec general election, St-Pierre Plamondon denied to reporters that neither he nor anyone in his party had sought out a meeting with the US government. However, it later was revealed that the Parti Québécois scheduled a meeting with US State Department officials in March in Washington, D.C. but was cancelled by the American government due to the 2026 Iran war. The State Department later added while it was normal for them to meet with representatives, the department declined which officials the party had sought to meet or what was expected. St-Pierre Plamondon denied that there was even an attempt to schedule a meeting; however, a text message from a US consular official revealed it was planned.

On the eve of election day, the Canadian Association of Journalists told Le Devoir that it took issue with his behavior towards journalists, by arguing that it is a political strategy to shift away responsibility for his inability to communicate with journalists.

=== Premier of Quebec (2026–present) ===
In the 2026 Quebec general election held on October 5, Parti Québécois, led by St-Pierre Plamondon, won 60 seats. However, the party fell short of a majority in the National Assembly of Quebec and formed a minority government, which is the first PQ government since 2012. St-Pierre Plamondon was sworn in as premier on October 21, 2026; in reflection of his desire to abolish the monarchy in Quebec, St-Pierre Plamondon requested that Lieutenant Governor of Quebec Manon Jeannotte not attend.

== Personal life ==
St-Pierre Plamondon lives with his wife Alexandra Tremblay on Île d'Orléans, near Quebec City. They have three children. In 2023, he moved to Camille-Laurin.

According to St-Pierre Plamondon, he speaks five languages, French, English, Spanish, Danish and Swedish.

== Electoral record ==
2026 Quebec general election: Camille-Laurin
** Preliminary results — Not yet official **
Party	Candidate	Votes	%	±%
Parti Québécois	Paul St-Pierre Plamondon	12,229	39.66	–2.02
Liberal	Earl Corales	6,806	22.07	+5.61
Québec solidaire	René Gauvreau	6,247	20.26	N/A
Coalition Avenir Québec	Matys Lavigne	2,688	8.72	–23.23
Conservative	Jessy Comtois	2,371	7.69	+1.17
Parti nul	Chantal Poulin	276	0.90	N/A
Climat Québec	Benoît Dupont	171	0.55	–0.29
Équipe Autonomiste	Louis Chandonnet	47	0.15	+0.01
Total valid votes		30,835	98.44	+7.12
Total rejected ballots		489	1.56	–7.12
Turnout		31,324	63.37	–0.08
Electors on the lists		49,429		
Parti Québécois hold		Swing		–3.82
Source: Élections Québec

2022 Quebec general election: Camille-Laurin
Party	Candidate	Votes	%	±%
Parti Québécois	Paul St-Pierre Plamondon	11,959	41.68	+17.21
Coalition Avenir Québec	Richard Campeau	9,165	31.94	-15.09
Liberal	Christina Eyangos	4,724	16.46	+3.61
Conservative	Christos Karteris	1,869	6.51	+5.5
Green	Bourama Keita	641	2.23	–
Climat Québec	Jean-Pierre Émand	241	0.84	–
Démocratie directe	Grace St-Gelais	49	0.17	–
Équipe Autonomiste	Charles Mc Nicoll	42	0.15	–
Total valid votes		28,690	91.32	
Total rejected ballots		2,728	8.68	
Turnout		31,418	63.45	
Eligible voters		49,518		

2020 Parti Québécois leadership election results by round
Candidate	1st round		2nd round		3rd round	
Candidate	Votes cast	%	Votes cast	%	Votes cast	%
Paul St-Pierre Plamondon	9,042	35.44%	10,554	41.59%	13,530	56.02%
Sylvain Gaudreault	8,415	32.98%	8,906	35.09%	10,621	43.98%
Guy Nantel	5,499	21.55%	5,917	23.32%	Eliminated	
Frédéric Bastien	2,559	10.03%	Eliminated			
Total	25,515	100%	25,377	100%	24,151	100%

2018 Quebec general election: Prévost
Party	Candidate	Votes	%	±%
Coalition Avenir Québec	Marguerite Blais	14,876	47.03	–
Parti Québécois	Paul St-Pierre Plamondon	7,739	24.47	–
Québec solidaire	Lucie Mayer	4,414	13.96	–
Liberal	Naömie Goyette	4,063	12.85	–
Conservative	Malcolm Mulcahy	303	0.96	–
Parti libre	Michel Leclerc	235	0.74	–
Total valid votes		31,630	98.51	
Total rejected ballots		477	1.49	
Turnout		32,107	70.80	
Eligible voters		45,347		

2016 Parti Québécois leadership election results by round
Candidate	1st round		2nd round	
Candidate	Votes cast	%	Votes cast	%
Jean-François Lisée	25,936	47.03%	27,801	50.63%
Alexandre Cloutier	16,357	29.66%	17,403	31.70%
Martine Ouellet	9,077	16.46%	9,702	17.67%
Paul St-Pierre Plamondon	3,772	6.84%	Eliminated	
Total	55,142	100%	54,906	100%

== Notes ==
Political offices
Preceded by Pascal Bérubé	Leader of Parti québécois 2020–present	Succeeded by Incumbent
Preceded by Christine Fréchette	Premier of Quebec; 2026–present	Succeeded by Incumbent
Order of precedence
Preceded by Doug Ford as Premier of Ontario	Order of Precedence of Canada as Premier of Quebec	Succeeded by Tim Houston as Premier of Nova Scotia
