= Louise Laurin =

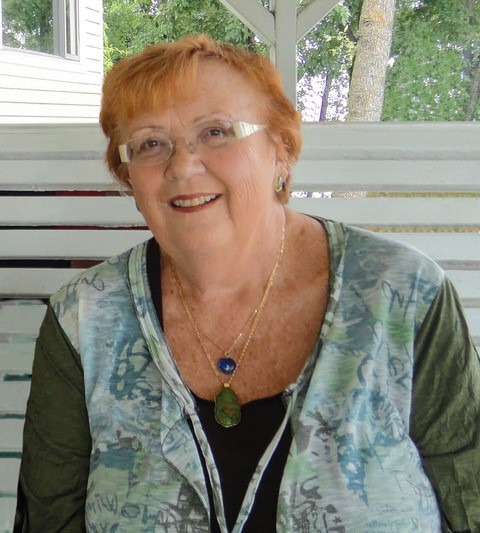
Image of Louise Laurin

Louise Laurin (1935 – 7 January 2013) was an educator and activist in Quebec. She was a prominent supporter of both secular education and Quebec sovereignty.

== Educator ==
Laurin was an elementary school principal for a number of years and is credited with starting the first in-school daycare in the Montreal Catholic School Commission. In 1989, she worked on behalf of a Turkish immigrant family that was threatened with deportation.

In 1990, Laurin co-authored a public letter with Francine Lalonde and two other Quebec nationalist figures. They argued that many children of immigrants were intimidating francophone students into speaking English at francophone schools and charged that school administrations were deliberately ignoring the situation. They called for a renewed promotion of French in public schools, in a way that would recognize also the legitimate concerns of immigrant communities.

During the 1990s and 2000s, Laurin led a coalition of educational and cultural groups calling for the secularization of Quebec's school system, in which denominational schools would be replaced by linguistic schools. She supported a bill introduced by Jean Charest's government to this end in 2005.

== Sovereigntist ==
Laurin ran as a candidate of the Parti Québécois in the 1989 provincial election and lost a close contest in the Montreal division of Anjou to Liberal candidate René Serge Larouche.

She succeeded Sylvain Simard as president of the Mouvement national des Québécoises et des Québécois in 1994. Shortly after taking this position, she made a public statement against both bilingualism and multiculturalism. She argued that a future independent Quebec would have French as its only official language and further recommended that it refuse citizenship to any immigrant who does not learn French in a set number of years. She said that her group opposed multiculturalism because "it means we pay for people to conserve their culture and then they live in ghettos. We want integration in society, the sharing of common values, like language and our institutions." In the 1995 Quebec referendum on sovereignty, she was vice-president of the Conseil de la souverainete du Quebec.

Associated with the left wing of the Parti Québécois, Laurin was openly skeptical of Andre Boisclair's leadership in 2005. In 2009, she appeared at the fifth congress of the Québec solidaire party.

She was chosen as Patriote of the year by the Société Saint-Jean-Baptiste de Montréal in 2005.
