= Lise Thériault =

Canadian politician

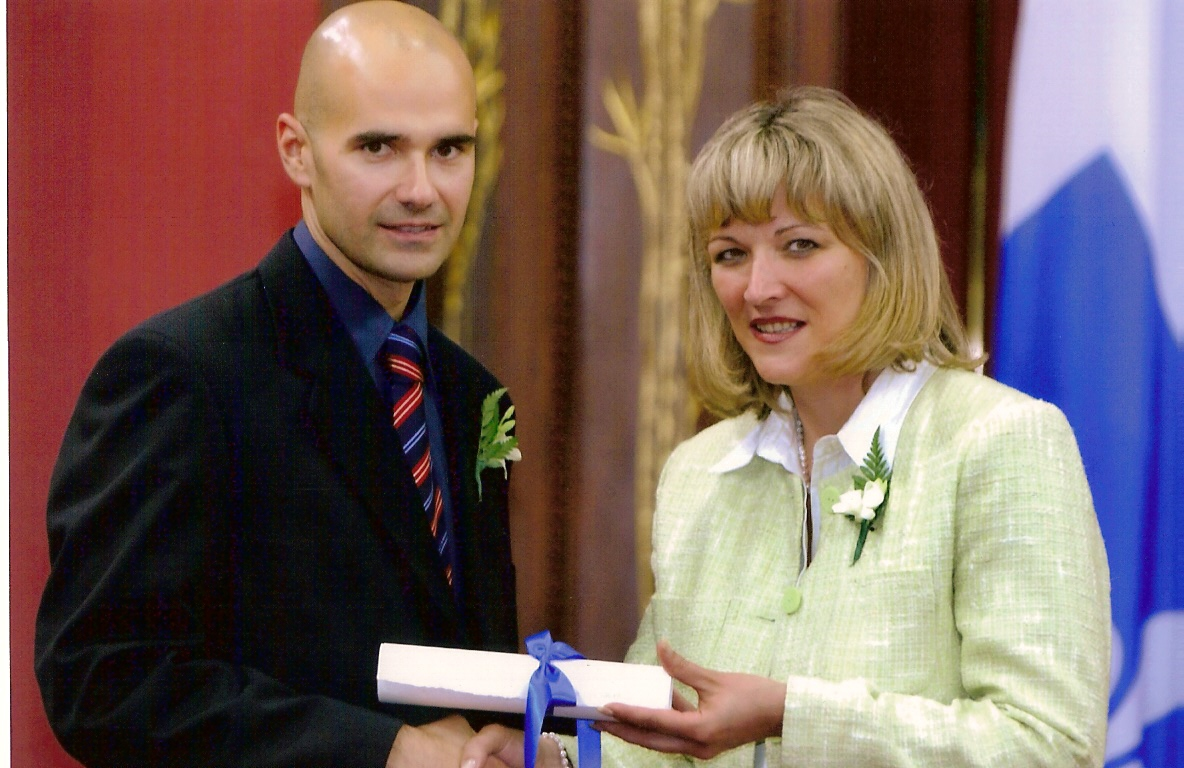
- Theriault (right)

Deputy Premier of Quebec
- In office April 23, 2014 – October 11, 2017
- Premier: Philippe Couillard
- Preceded by: François Gendron
- Succeeded by: Dominique Anglade

Member of the National Assembly of Quebec for Anjou–Louis-Riel Anjou (2002–2012)
- In office April 15, 2002 – August 28, 2022
- Preceded by: Jean-Sébastien Lamoureux
- Succeeded by: Karine Boivin Roy

Personal details
- Born: January 7, 1966 (age 60) Toronto, Ontario, Canada
- Party: Quebec Liberal Party
- Profession: Editor, businesswoman
- Cabinet: Minister of the Status of Women
- Portfolio: Minister of Immigration, Minister of Labour, Minister of Public Security

Lise Thériault (born January 7, 1966) is a former Canadian politician. She is a former Member of the National Assembly of Quebec representing the riding of Anjou–Louis-Riel in Montreal. She was the Deputy Premier of Quebec and Minister for the Status of Women in the Couillard government.

Before entering politics, Thériault was for eight years a sales director and was also for nine years an editor and co-founder of l'Édition – Le Journal des Gens d'affaires. She was an administration member of the Chamber of Commerce of Eastern Montreal, the CDEC Anjou/Montreal (a development organization) and the Collège Marie-Victorin. She was also a co-founder of a long-term care facility in Montreal.

She was elected in Anjou in a by-election in 2002 and re-elected in 2003. She was named the Minister of Immigration and Cultural Communities from 2005 to 2007 and was re-elected in the 2007 elections. Jean Charest did not reappoint her to cabinet in 2007, and Yolande James succeeded her to become the first ever Black cabinet minister in Quebec.

After the 2008 elections, she was named the delegate Minister for Social Services until 2010 where she replaced Sam Hamad as Minister of Labor.

Following the 2014 election, she was named Deputy Premier of Quebec and the first woman to become Minister of Public Security in the history of Quebec.

In 2016, she was reassigned to the Status of Women portfolio but remained deputy premier until 2017.

She decided not to seek re-election for the 2022 Quebec Provincial election.

== Electoral record ==
2014 Quebec general election: Anjou–Louis-Riel
Party	Candidate	Votes	%	±%
Liberal	Lise Thériault	16,049	50.81	+10.69
Parti Québécois	Yasmina Chouakri	7,326	23.19	-7.78
Coalition Avenir Québec	Richard Campeau	5,315	16.83	-2.9
Québec solidaire	Marlène Lessard	2,448	7.75	+0.48
Green	Annibal Teclou	303	0.96	–
Option nationale	Raphaël Couture	147	0.47	-0.79
Total valid votes		31,588	98.58	–
Total rejected ballots		454	1.42	–
Turnout		32,042	73.29	-2.04
Electors on the lists		43,718	–	–
Liberal hold		Swing		–

2012 Quebec general election: Anjou–Louis-Riel
Party	Candidate	Votes	%	±%
Liberal	Lise Thériault	12,953	40.12	-10.32
Parti Québécois	Martine Roux	9,998	30.97	-3.47
Coalition Avenir Québec	Richard Campeau	6,371	19.73	+11.05
Québec solidaire	Marlène Lessard	2,347	7.27	+3.63
Option nationale	Raphaël Couture	407	1.26	
Coalition pour la constituante	Samuel Stohl	113	0.35	
Marxist–Leninist	Linda Sullivan	99	0.31	
Total valid votes		32,288	98.64	–
Total rejected ballots		446	1.36	–
Turnout		32,734	75.33	
Electors on the lists		43,456	–	–
Liberal hold		Swing		-3.43

^ Change is from redistributed results. CAQ change is from ADQ.

2008 Quebec general election: Anjou
Party	Candidate	Votes	%
Liberal	Lise Thériault	13,082	50.44
Parti Québécois	Sébastien Richard	8,930	34.43
Action démocratique	Jacques Lachapelle	2,252	8.68
Québec solidaire	Francine Gagné	944	3.64
Green	Sylvie Morneau	727	2.80
Total valid votes		25,935	98.54
Total rejected ballots		385	1.46
Turnout		26,320	58.88
Electors		44,703	

2007 Quebec general election: Anjou
Party	Candidate	Votes	%
Liberal	Lise Thériault	13,280	41.36
Parti Québécois	Sébastien Richard	8,795	27.39
Action démocratique	Lorraine Laperrière	7,409	23.07
Green	Alain Bissonnette	1,376	4.29
Québec solidaire	Francine Gagné	1,151	3.58
Marxist–Leninist	Hélène Héroux	99	0.31
Total valid votes		32,110	98.97
Total rejected ballots		333	1.03
Turnout		32,443	72.04
Electors		45,034	
Source: Official Results, Le Directeur général des élections du Québec.

2003 Quebec general election: Anjou
Party	Candidate	Votes	%
Liberal	Lise Thériault	17,572	53.69
Parti Québécois	France Bachand	10,573	32.30
Action démocratique	Martin Janson	4,319	13.20
Marxist–Leninist	Hélène Héroux	266	0.81
Total valid votes		32,730	98.46
Rejected and declined votes		513	1.54
Turnout		33,243	73.30
Electors on the lists		45,350	
Source: Official Results, Le Directeur général des élections du Québec.

Quebec provincial by-election, April 15, 2002: Anjou
Party	Candidate	Votes	%
Liberal	Lise Thériault	8,845	54.59
Parti Québécois	Aude Vézina	4,275	26.38
Action démocratique	Nathalie Proulx	2,848	17.58
Green	David Hamel	163	1.01
Independent	Régent Millette	72	0.44
Total valid votes		16,203	98.91
Rejected and declined votes		178	1.09
Turnout		16,381	46.62
Electors on the lists		35,134	
Source: Official Results, Le Directeur général des élections du Québec.

Political offices
Preceded by François Gendron	Deputy Premier of Quebec; 2014–2017	Succeeded by Dominique Anglade
Preceded by Stéphanie Vallée	Minister of the Status of Women; 2016–present	Succeeded by Incumbent
Preceded by Stéphane Bergeron	Minister of Public Security; 2014–2016	Succeeded by Martin Coiteux
Preceded by Sam Hamad	Minister of Labour; 2010–2012	Succeeded by Agnès Maltais
Preceded by none	Minister of Immigration and Cultural Communities; 2005–2007	Succeeded by Yolande James
