= Pierre Bélanger =

Canadian lawyer and politician

Member of the National Assembly of Quebec for Anjou
- In office 1992–1998
- Preceded by: René Serge Larouche
- Succeeded by: Jean-Sébastien Lamoureux

Personal details
- Born: April 23, 1960 (age 65) Montreal, Quebec
- Party: Parti Québécois

Pierre Bélanger (born April 23, 1960) is a Canadian lawyer and politician in the province of Quebec. Bélanger was a Parti Québécois (PQ) member of the National Assembly of Quebec from 1992 to 1998 and was a cabinet minister in the government of Lucien Bouchard.

== Early life and career ==
Bélanger was born in Montreal. He received a law degree from the Université de Montréal in 1982, was admitted to the Bar of Quebec the following year, and has practised commercial and civil law with the firm Bélanger and Bélanger.

== Career ==
=== Opposition member ===
Bélanger was first elected to the Quebec legislature in a by-election held in the Montreal division of Anjou on January 20, 1992. The seat had previously been held by the Quebec Liberal Party, and Bélanger's election was regarded as demonstrating increased support for Quebec sovereignty.

The Liberal Party held a majority in the legislature during this period; Bélanger served with the official opposition and was his party's justice critic. He promised that the PQ, if elected, would appoint more members of minority communities to Quebec's judiciary.

=== Government member and junior cabinet minister ===
Bélanger was re-elected by a narrow margin in the 1994 provincial election. The PQ won a majority government in the election, and Bélanger served as a deputy speaker of the assembly for the next two years. When Lucien Bouchard became premier of Quebec on January 29, 1996, he promoted Bélanger to government house leader and minister responsible for electoral and parliamentary reform.

In August 1996, Bélanger complained that English/French bilingual signs were proliferating in both the English and French areas of Montreal. (The PQ has historically supported French-only signs as a means of promoting the French language in Quebec.) The following year, he announced that the Bouchard government would appeal a Quebec Superior Court ruling that the province had no jurisdiction over acts committed by people based outside Quebec in the 1995 referendum on sovereignty. This ruling pertained to four persons and groups based in Ontario who transported people to a Canadian federalist rally in Montreal shortly before election day.

Bélanger defended the harsh austerity measures in the Bouchard government's 1997 budget, saying that the government's credibility would be judged by its fiscal management.

=== Minister of Public Security ===
Bélanger was promoted to a full cabinet position on August 25, 1997, as minister of public security. Shortly after his appointment, he resolved a labour dispute with Quebec's jail guards by permitting the guards to wear bulletproof vests and carry weapons when transporting prisoners. Later in the year, he criticized other Canadian provinces for not doing enough to combat biker gangs.

In response to the North American ice storm of 1998, Bélanger requested and received permission from the Canadian government for Canadian Forces to act as police officers to prevent looting in Montreal. This was the first time that Canadian soldiers had patrolled the streets of Montreal since the 1970 FLQ crisis, and some journalists noted the irony that this would take place under a sovereigntist government. Bélanger also served on an emergency response committee during the ice storm and later introduced legislation to create auxiliary reserve teams to deal with future natural disasters.

In April 1998, Bélanger outlined a strategy for dealing with Quebec's contraband cigarette trade. The plan included both a crackdown on the illicit trade and negotiated tax collection agreements with the province's indigenous communities.

Bélanger also concluded an agreement with the Kahnawake Mohawk community to permit legal mixed boxing events; the government had previously banned extreme fighting events in Kahnawake on the grounds that the competition was too brutal. In June 1998, he concluded a tripartite policing agreement with the Canadian government and the Listuguj Mi'gmaq First Nation.

One of Bélanger's last actions in cabinet was to approve the appointment of Michel Sarrazin as Montreal's police chief.

==== Defeat ====
Bélanger was defeated in the 1998 provincial election, losing to Liberal candidate Jean-Sébastien Lamoureux by 143 votes. He was the only PQ cabinet minister to be defeated in this election and stood down from cabinet on December 15, 1998. (Lamoureux would late resign from the legislature in 2001, after a former campaign workers was convicted of bribing people to vote several times in the 1998 election using false names. Lamoureux himself was not implicated in the scandal. Bélanger did not contest the by-election that followed, though at one stage he complained that it was "easier to vote twice in Quebec than to rent a video at a video store without a membership card.")

==== Canadian federal politics ====
Bélanger voted for the Progressive Conservative Party of Canada in the 1988 federal election. In the 1993 election, he campaigned with Bloc Québécois (BQ) candidate Roger Pomerleau.

During the 1997 federal election, Bélanger criticized BQ leader Gilles Duceppe statement's that a vote in favour of Quebec sovereignty would not necessarily finalize Quebec's status as an independent country. He responded to Duceppe's remark by saying, "Once we have a Yes vote on the sovereignty issue in the next referendum, I think the question of Quebec will be settled and that we will be a sovereign state."

=== Later career ===
Bélanger returned to his legal practice after leaving the legislature and served as president of the Commission des services juridiques from 1999 to 2004. He ran for mayor of the east-end borough of Mercier–Hochelaga-Maisonneuve in the 2005 Montreal municipal election as a candidate of the Montreal mayor Gérald Tremblay's Montreal Island Citizens Union, but was defeated.

== Electoral record ==
2005 Montreal municipal election: Borough mayor, Mercier–Hochelaga-Maisonneuve
Party	Candidate	Votes	%	±%
Vision Montreal	Lyn Thériault Faust (incumbent councillor)	15,130	48.07	
Citizens Union	Pierre Bélanger	13,079	41.56	
Projet Montréal	Éric Alan Caldwell	3,263	10.37	
Total valid votes		31,472	100	
Source: City of Montreal official results (in French), City of Montreal.

1998 Quebec general election: Anjou
Party	Candidate	Votes	%
Liberal	Jean-Sébastien Lamoureux	12,097	44.51
Parti Québécois	Pierre Bélanger	11,954	43.98
Action démocratique	Michel Lalonde	2,825	10.39
Socialist Democracy	Bernard Beaulieu	192	0.71
Innovator	Roberto Barba	68	0.25
Communist	Teresa Vergara	44	0.16
Total valid votes		27,180	98.61
Total rejected ballots		384	1.39
Turnout		27,564	82.31
Electors		33,488	
Source: Official Results, Le Directeur général des élections du Québec.

1994 Quebec general election: Anjou
Party	Candidate	Votes	%
Parti Québécois	Pierre Bélanger	12,453	46.60
Liberal	Richard Quirion	11,697	43.77
Action démocratique	Michel Lalonde	1,753	6.56
New Democratic	Richard Duval	537	2.01
Natural Law	Gilles Raymond	188	0.70
Innovator	Nicole Migneault	98	0.37
Total valid votes		26,726	98.02
Total rejected ballots		539	1.98
Turnout		27,265	85.53
Electors		31,878	
Source: Official Results, Le Directeur général des élections du Québec.

Quebec provincial by-election, January 20, 1992: Anjou
Party	Candidate	Votes	%
Parti Québécois	Pierre Bélanger	8,619	52.14
Liberal	Charlotte Goudreault	7,342	44.41
New Democratic	Daniel Boucher	283	1.71
Independent	Patrice Fortin	143	0.87
United Social Credit	Emilien Martel	61	0.37
N/A (Communist League)	Michel Prairie	45	0.27
Independent	Jolly Taylor	38	0.23
Total valid votes		16,531	98.73
Total rejected ballots		213	1.27
Turnout		16,744	57.65
Electors		29,043	
Source: Official Results, Le Directeur général des élections du Québec.
