= René Serge Larouche =

Canadian politician

Member of the National Assembly of Quebec for Anjou
- In office June 20, 1988 – June 19, 1991
- Preceded by: Pierre-Marc Johnson
- Succeeded by: Pierre Bélanger

Personal details
- Born: February 27, 1944 Alma, Quebec
- Died: October 14, 2023 (aged 79)
- Party: Liberal (1988-1990); Independent (1990-1991)
- Profession: marketing consultant

René Serge Larouche (February 27, 1944 – October 14, 2023) was a Canadian politician, who represented the electoral district of Anjou in the National Assembly of Quebec from 1988 to 1991.

A marketing consultant, he was first elected as a Quebec Liberal Party MNA in a by-election on June 20, 1988, following the resignation of Pierre-Marc Johnson during the 33rd Quebec Legislature, defeating former Parti Québécois cabinet minister Pauline Marois. He was re-elected in the 1989 Quebec general election, defeating PQ candidate Louise Laurin; however, following the Oka Crisis of 1990, he quit the Liberal Party caucus on the grounds that he was opposed to the government negotiating with "terrorists".

He sat the remainder of his term in the assembly as an independent, until resigning the legislature on June 19, 1991.
