= Karine Boivin Roy =

Canadian politician

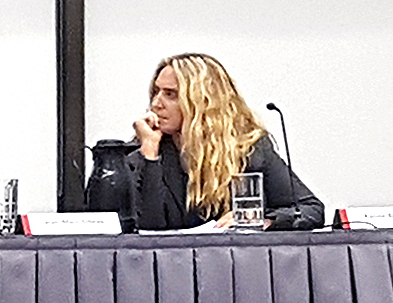
- Karine Boivin Roy in 2016

Member of the National Assembly of Quebec for Anjou-Louis-Riel
- In office October 3, 2022 – October 5, 2026
- Preceded by: Lise Thériault
- Succeeded by: Nicolas Plourde

Montreal City Councillor for Louis-Riel
- In office November 3, 2013 – November 7, 2021
- Preceded by: Lyn Thériault
- Succeeded by: Alba Zuniga Ramos

Personal details
- Born: 1971 (age 54–55) Chicoutimi, Quebec
- Party: Coalition Avenir Québec; Ensemble Montréal

Karine Boivin Roy (born 1971) is a Canadian politician and lawyer, who was elected to the National Assembly of Quebec in the 2022 Quebec general election, representing the electoral district of Anjou–Louis-Riel as a member of the Coalition Avenir Québec until 2026.

She previously served on Montreal City Council as representative for Louis-Riel ward in the borough of Mercier–Hochelaga-Maisonneuve from 2013 to 2021. A member of the Ensemble Montréal political party, she was first elected in the 2013 municipal election. She was re-elected in the 2017 municipal election.

== Electoral record ==
=== Provincial ===
2026 Quebec general election: Anjou–Louis-Riel
** Preliminary results — Not yet official **
Party	Candidate	Votes	%	±%
Liberal	Nicolas Plourde	10,242	40.05	+9.53
Parti Québécois	Younès Dadoun	5,329	20.84	+9.80
Québec solidaire	Edissya Boukrif	3,733	14.60	–0.17
Coalition Avenir Québec	Karine Boivin Roy	3,572	13.97	–21.59
Conservative	Helder Da Costa Leitao	2,405	9.40	+2.24
Climat Québec	Claude Gélinas	151	0.59	–0.18
Parti nul	Francis Desjardins	142	0.56	N/A
Total valid votes		25,574	98.20	–0.21
Total rejected ballots		469	1.80	+0.21
Turnout		26,043	62.68	–1.17
Electors on the lists		41,546		
Liberal gain from Coalition Avenir Québec		Swing		–0.14
Source: Élections Québec

2022 Quebec general election: Anjou–Louis-Riel
Party	Candidate	Votes	%	±%
Coalition Avenir Québec	Karine Boivin Roy	9,376	35.56	+6.65
Liberal	Chantal Gagnon	8,045	30.52	-8.55
Québec solidaire	Laurence Pageau	3,893	14.77	+0.24
Parti Québécois	Yastene Adda	2,910	11.04	-3.66
Conservative	Geneviève Deneault	1,887	7.16	–
Climat Québec	Claude Gélinas	203	0.77	–
Independent	Katy LeRougetel	49	0.19	–
Total valid votes		26,363	98.41	–
Total rejected ballots		427	1.59	-0.20
Turnout		26,790	63.85	-0.63
Electors on the lists		41,956	–	–
Coalition Avenir Québec gain from Liberal		Swing		+7.60

=== Municipal ===
2017 Montreal municipal election: City Councillor, Louis Riel
Party	Candidate	Votes	%	±%
Équipe Denis Coderre	Karine Boivin Roy	5,180	52.76	+18.50
Projet Montréal	Isi Meza	4,386	44.67	+16.31
Coalition Montréal	Joao Neves	252	2.57	-25.93
Total valid votes/expense limit		9,818	97.08	
Total rejected ballots		295	2.92	-1.75
Turnout		10,113	45.43	-0.81
Eligible voters		22,262	–	–

2013 Montreal municipal election: City Councillor, Louis Riel
Party	Candidate	Votes	%	±%
Équipe Denis Coderre	Karine Boivin Roy	3,327	34.26	new
Coalition Montréal	Lyn Thériault	2,786	28.50	new
Projet Montréal	Michel Bouchard	2,754	28.36	+2.63
Intégrité Montréal	Sonia Robert	863	8.89	new
Total valid votes/expense limit		9,712	95.33	
Total rejected ballots		476	4.67	N/A
Turnout		10,188	46.24	+3.13
Eligible voters		22,032	–	–
