= Jean-Sébastien Lamoureux =

Canadian politician

Member of the National Assembly of Quebec for Anjou
- In office 1998–2001
- Preceded by: Pierre Bélanger
- Succeeded by: Lise Thériault

Personal details
- Born: February 28, 1974 (age 52) Anjou, Quebec
- Party: Liberal

Jean-Sébastien Lamoureux (born February 28, 1974) is a Canadian lawyer, manager and former politician in the province of Quebec. He served in the National Assembly of Quebec as a Liberal from 1998 until his resignation in 2001.

== Early life and career ==
Lamoureux was born in Anjou on the east end of the Island of Montreal. He worked as an intern in the office of the Canadian minister of Foreign Affairs from 1994 to 1995 and in the office of the leader of the official opposition of Quebec in 1996. Lamoureux received a law degree from the Université de Montréal in 1996, was called to the bar of Quebec the following year, and worked with the firm Leduc, Leblanc from 1997 to 1998. In 2001, he received a graduate degree in management from HEC Montréal.

His father, Jacques Lamoureux, has served as president of the Quebec Liberal Party.

== Legislator ==
Lamoureux was nominated as the Liberal candidate for Anjou in the buildup to the 1998 provincial election. The governing Parti Québécois (PQ) had won the seat by a narrow margin in the previous election, and the contest was expected to be close. Lamoureux focused his campaign on opposition to another referendum on Quebec sovereignty, in the aftermath of the Canadian federalist option's narrow victory in 1995. On election day, he defeated incumbent PQ cabinet minister Pierre Bélanger by only 143 votes.

The PQ won a second consecutive majority government in 1998, and Lamoureux served as a member of the official opposition. He was appointed as his party's immigration critic and supported a policy of encouraging increased settlement of new immigrants in Quebec's regions. He also spoke against growing anti-Muslim prejudice in the aftermath of the attacks of September 11, 2001.

=== Resignation ===
Reports surfaced in February 1999 that voter fraud had played a role in the outcome of the 1998 election in Anjou. The PQ filed an official complaint with Quebec's chief returning officer, and defeated candidate Pierre Bélanger indicated that his party had identified forty confirmed instances of voting irregularities. Lamoureux responded that he had no knowledge of voter fraud and had done nothing wrong. This notwithstanding, Liberal leader Jean Charest indicated that he would welcome an investigation from the province's electoral office, so as to provide clarity in the matter.

In August 1999, Quebec election officials charged four persons with electoral fraud in relation to the Anjou vote. In May 2001, Claude Lavigne was convicted of paying poor people ten dollars every time they voted for the Liberals. In September of the same year, former Liberal Party campaign worker Alberto Berardinucci was fined ten thousand dollars for hiring people to vote several times using false names.

The province's chief electoral officer concluded that the Liberal Party had not orchestrated the vote-buying scheme, and Lamoureux was not personally implicated in the scandal. He nonetheless resigned from the legislature on September 19, 2001, one day after Berardinucci's conviction, on the grounds that doubts had been cast on the validity of his election. A Montreal Gazette columnist later noted that no-one was certain if enough fraudulent votes had been cast to affect the outcome of the vote.

Lamoureux was not a candidate in the by-election that followed his resignation.

== Subsequent career ==
Lamoureux returned to practicing law from 2001 to 2003, working with the firm of Osler, Hoskin and Harcourt. From 2003 to 2006, he was chief of staff to Quebec's Treasury Board president, Monique Jérôme-Forget. In 2006, he was appointed as vice-president of subsidiaries for Investissement Québec and chief executive officer of FIER Partenaires.

Lamoureux joined the board of directors of the École polytechnique de Montréal and the company Innovatech in March 2009. The following year, he joined the Kirchner Private Capital Group and served on the board of Réseau capital.

== Electoral record ==
1998 Quebec general election: Anjou
Party	Candidate	Votes	%
Liberal	Jean-Sébastien Lamoureux	12,097	44.51
Parti Québécois	Pierre Bélanger	11,954	43.98
Action démocratique	Michel Lalonde	2,825	10.39
Socialist Democracy	Bernard Beaulieu	192	0.71
Innovator	Roberto Barba	68	0.25
Communist	Teresa Vergara	44	0.16
Total valid votes		27,180	98.61
Total rejected ballots		384	1.39
Turnout		27,564	82.31
Electors		33,488	
Source: Official Results, Le Directeur général des élections du Québec.
