= Nicolas Plourde =

Canadian politician

Nicolas Plourde MNA

Member of the National Assembly for Anjou–Louis-Riel
- Incumbent
- Assumed office October 5, 2026
- Preceded by: Karine Boivin Roy

Personal details
- Party: Liberal Party

Nicolas Plourde MNA is a Canadian politician who served as a member of the National Assembly of Quebec representing the electoral district of Anjou–Louis-Riel since 2026. He is a member of the Liberal Party.

== Electoral record ==
2026 Quebec general election: Anjou–Louis-Riel
** Preliminary results — Not yet official **
Party	Candidate	Votes	%	±%
Liberal	Nicolas Plourde	10,242	40.05	+9.53
Parti Québécois	Younès Dadoun	5,329	20.84	+9.80
Québec solidaire	Edissya Boukrif	3,733	14.60	–0.17
Coalition Avenir Québec	Karine Boivin Roy	3,572	13.97	–21.59
Conservative	Helder Da Costa Leitao	2,405	9.40	+2.24
Climat Québec	Claude Gélinas	151	0.59	–0.18
Parti nul	Francis Desjardins	142	0.56	N/A
Total valid votes		25,574	98.20	–0.21
Total rejected ballots		469	1.80	+0.21
Turnout		26,043	62.68	–1.17
Electors on the lists		41,546		
Liberal gain from Coalition Avenir Québec		Swing		–0.14
Source: Élections Québec
