= Scott McKay =

Scott McKay may refer to:

- Scott McKay (politician)
- Scott McKay (actor)
- Scott McKay (ice hockey)

== See also ==
- Scott Mackay, Canadian mystery and science fiction author
