= Section 128 of the Constitution Act, 1867 =

Provision of the Constitution of Canada

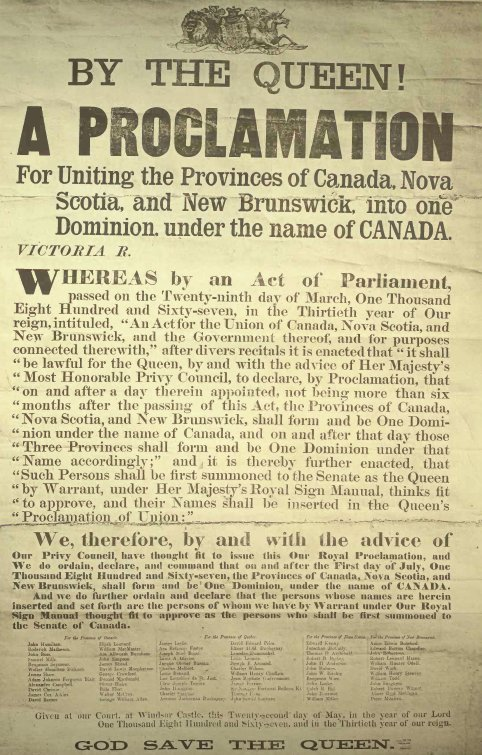
Royal Proclamation which brought the Act into force on July 1, 1867

Section 128 of the Constitution Act, 1867 is a provision of the Constitution of Canada relating to the oath of allegiance for members of the Senate and the House of Commons of Canada, as well as members of the provincial legislative assemblies. The section also requires members of the Senate to make a declaration of qualification. The texts of the oath and the declaration of qualification are set out in the Fifth Schedule of the Act. The section also applied to members of the provincial legislative councils, but since they have all been abolished, it no longer has any application in that regard.

The Constitution Act, 1867 is the constitutional statute which established Canada. Originally named the British North America Act, 1867, the Act continues to be the foundational statute for the Constitution of Canada, although it has been amended many times since 1867. It is now recognised as part of the supreme law of Canada.

== Constitution Act, 1867 ==
The Constitution Act, 1867 is part of the Constitution of Canada and thus part of the supreme law of Canada. It was the product of extensive negotiations by the governments of the British North American provinces in the 1860s. The Act sets out the constitutional framework of Canada, including the structure of the federal government and the powers of the federal government and the provinces. Originally enacted in 1867 by the British Parliament under the name the British North America Act, 1867, in 1982 the Act was brought under full Canadian control through the Patriation of the Constitution, and was renamed the Constitution Act, 1867. Since Patriation, the Act can only be amended in Canada, under the amending formula set out in the Constitution Act, 1982.

== Text of section 128 ==
Section 128 reads:

Oath of Allegiance, &c.
128 Every Member of the Senate or House of Commons of Canada shall before taking his Seat therein take and subscribe before the Governor General or some Person authorized by him, and every Member of a Legislative Council or Legislative Assembly of any Province shall before taking his Seat therein take and subscribe before the Lieutenant Governor of the Province or some Person authorized by him, the Oath of Allegiance contained in the Fifth Schedule to this Act; and every Member of the Senate of Canada and every Member of the Legislative Council of Quebec shall also, before taking his Seat therein, take and subscribe before the Governor General, or some Person authorized by him, the Declaration of Qualification contained in the same Schedule.

Section 128 is found in Part IX of the Constitution Act, 1867, dealing with miscellaneous provisions of a general nature. It has not been amended since the Act was enacted in 1867.

Section 128Q.1, was inserted by An Act to recognize the oath provided in the Act respecting the National Assembly as the sole oath required in order to sit in the Assembly on 9 December 2022, provides:

128Q.1. Section 128 does not apply to Quebec.

== Purpose and interpretation ==
=== Oath of allegiance ===
==== Requirement to swear the oath ====
Before taking their seat in the Commons or the Senate, a member must swear the oath of allegiance required by this section. The oath does not make the person a member of the Commons or the Senate, but is a necessary condition before they are permitted to exercise their functions in Parliament. A member who does not take the oath cannot take their seat and cannot vote in Parliament. Nor will the member receive the sessional allowance.

There is nothing in either s. 128 or the Fifth Schedule which authorises a member to affirm their allegiance, rather than swear an oath. In 1905 the instructions to the Governor General were modified to authorise members to affirm their allegiance, rather than swear an oath. A Library of Parliament research paper has questioned whether the constitutional requirement to swear an oath can be waived in this way, but the issue does not appear to have been raised in Parliament.

No member of the Commons or the Senate has ever intentionally refused to take the oath, but there was one case in the 19th century when a member of the Commons, George Turner Orton, voted in the House without having taken the oath. The omission appears to have been unintentional. He had been elected in the general election and had sworn the oath. His election was then overturned on an election challenge, but he was re-elected in a by-election. He apparently did not realise he had to take the oath again. When the matter was drawn to his attention, he promptly swore the oath. However, a committee of the Commons charged with investigating the issue recommended that his votes prior to taking the oath should be struck from the records of the House.

==== Historical origins ====
Oaths of allegiance as a condition of serving in Parliament date back to the religious conflicts in England in the 16th century, when an oath of allegiance was required to sit in the English Parliament. The oath was a means of asserting the supremacy of the English monarch, and had the effect of excluding Catholics and members of other religions from Parliament. In the Maritime colonies, the oaths of allegiance similarly excluded Roman Catholics and also Jews from holding public office. However, when the British government created the legislatures of the provinces of Lower Canada and Upper Canada, a different oath was devised that did not have any religious exclusions, given the large Roman Catholic population of Lower Canada. The oath requirement nonetheless excluded Jews from holding office, since the oath had to be sworn on the New Testament. It was not until 1832 that Lower Canada passed a law authorising Jews to hold office, the first such law in the British Empire. The oath from the Constitutional Act, 1791 was continued in the Union Act, 1840, which united Lower Canada and Upper Canada into the Province of Canada.

In 1867, the much simplified version of the oath was included in the Constitution Act, 1867.

==== Application to provincial legislatures ====
Members of the provincial legislatures are also required to swear the oath of allegiance. Some legislative assemblies also allow for solemn affirmations in place of the oath.

The requirement does not apply to the legislative assemblies of the three territories, since they are not mentioned in s. 128. Instead, all three have statutory requirements for oaths of allegiance and office.

==== Alternative oaths ====
The requirement to take the oath set out in s. 128 does not prevent the creation of new oaths by statute, as an additional requirement. There have been private member bills introduced in the House of Commons proposing the creation of a new statutory oath of allegiance to Canada and the Constitution of Canada, but none of these have passed.

When the Parti Québécois was elected in Quebec in 1976, the oath of allegiance was apparently an issue for some members, who took the oath on the understanding that they were swearing allegiance to the Queen in right of Quebec. Since 1982, members of the Quebec National Assembly swear an additional oath of loyalty to the people of Quebec, and promise to perform their duties in conformity with the constitution of Quebec.

=== Declaration of qualification ===
Section 128 also requires newly appointed senators to make a declaration of qualification before taking their seat in the Senate, stating that they meet the constitutional requirements for appointment to the Senate. The text of the declaration of qualification is set out in the Fifth Schedule.

The required qualifications are set out in section 23 of the Act:

- be 30 years of age or older;
- be a natural-born subject of the Queen or subsequently naturalized (in practice, this now means having Canadian citizenship);
- own real property worth at least four thousand dollars in the province represented;
- possess a net worth of at least four thousand dollars; and
- be a resident in the province or territory represented, and
- in the case of senators from Quebec, hold their real property in the senatorial division for which they are appointed.

Although section 128 only requires the declaration of qualification at the time a senator first take their seat, the Senate rules require each senator to make a declaration of qualification at the beginning of each new Parliament. The declaration of qualification set out in the Fifth Schedule is used for this purpose.

== Related provisions ==
Section 23 of the Act sets out the constitutional qualifications for senators, which is the basis for the declaration of qualification referred to in this section and the Fifth Schedule.

Section 71 of the Act provided that the Legislature of Quebec consisted of a legislative assembly and a legislative council. This section's requirement for an oath of allegiance applied to both the Legislative Assembly and the Legislative Council of Quebec. The requirement ceased to apply to the Legislative Council when Quebec abolished it in 1968, but continues to apply to the members of the Legislative Assembly, re-named the National Assembly of Quebec.

Section 73 of the Act provided that the members of the Legislative Council of Quebec had to meet the same property and residency qualifications as members of the Senate of Canada, set out by section 23 of the Act. The requirement to make the declaration of qualification therefore also applied to the members of the Legislative Council. That requirement ceased to apply when Quebec abolished the Legislative Council in 1968.

Section 88 of the Act continued the pre-Confederation governments of New Brunswick and Nova Scotia, which both had legislative councils. This section's requirement for the oath of allegiance applied to the members of those provincial legislative councils, until they were abolished by each province. The requirement for the oath continues to apply to the members of the legislative assemblies of those provinces.

The Manitoba Act, 1870 created the province of Manitoba in 1870. The new province had a bicameral Legislature with a Legislative Assembly and a Legislative Council. This section's requirement for an oath of allegiance applied to both the Legislative Assembly and the Legislative Council. The requirement ceased to apply to the Legislative Council when Manitoba abolished it in 1876, but continues to apply to the members of the Legislative Assembly.

When Prince Edward Island joined Confederation in 1873, it had a bicameral legislature with a house of assembly and a legislative council. This section's requirement for an oath of allegiance applied to both the House of Assembly and the Legislative Council. The two were merged into a single Legislative Assembly of Prince Edward Island in 1893. The oath requirement continues to apply to the members of the Assembly.

Alberta, British Columbia, Newfoundland and Labrador, and Saskatchewan all have unicameral legislatures. The oath requirement applies to the members of the legislative assemblies of each of those provinces.

== Fifth Schedule: Text ==
The texts of the oath of office and declaration of qualification are set out in the Fifth Schedule to the Act, which reads as follows:

Oath of Allegiance

I, A.B., do swear, that I will be faithful and bear true allegiance to Her Majesty Queen Victoria.

Note.—The name of the King or Queen of the United Kingdom of Great Britain and Ireland for the time being is to be substituted from time to time, with proper terms of reference thereto.

Declaration of Qualification

I, A.B., do declare and testify, that I am by law duly qualified to be appointed a member of the Senate of Canada [or as the case may be], and that I am legally or equitably seised as of freehold for my own use and benefit of lands or tenements held in free and common socage [or seised or possessed for my own use and benefit of lands or tenements held in franc-alleu or in roture (as the case may be)] in the province of Nova Scotia [or as the case may be] of the value of four thousand dollars over and above all rents, dues, debts, mortgages, charges, and incumbrances due or payable out of or charged on or affecting the same, and that I have not collusively or colourably obtained a title to or become possessed of the said lands and tenements or any part thereof for the purpose of enabling me to become a member of the Senate of Canada [or as the case may be], and that my real and personal property are together worth four thousand dollars over and above my debts and liabilities.
