= Camille-Laurin (electoral district) =

Provincial electoral district in Quebec, Canada

Coordinates: 45.589°N 73.536°W

Quebec electoral district
- Location in Montreal

Provincial electoral district
- Legislature: National Assembly of Quebec
MNA
Paul St-Pierre Plamondon
Parti Québécois
- District created: 1960
- First contested: 1960
- Last contested: 2026

Demographics
- Population (2006): 63,300
- Electors (2014): 48,998
- Area (km²): 19.4
- Pop. density (per km²): 3,262.9
- Census division: Montreal (part)
- Census subdivision: Montreal (part)

Camille-Laurin (French pronunciation: [kamij loʁɛ̃]) is a provincial electoral district in Quebec, Canada, which elects members to the National Assembly of Quebec. The district is located within the Mercier–Hochelaga-Maisonneuve borough of Montreal. It includes territory between the boundary with Pointe-aux-Trembles borough and the Canadian National railway and between mostly Sherbrooke Street and the Anjou borough and the Saint Lawrence River.

It was created for the 1960 election from a part of Laval electoral district (not to be confused with the modern-day city of Laval, which was not established until 1965).

In the change from the 2001 to the 2011 electoral map, its territory was unchanged.

The riding was known from 1960 to 2022 as Bourget.

== Members of the Legislative Assembly / National Assembly ==
Legislature	Years	Member	Party
Bourget; Riding created from Laval
26th	1960–1962	Jean Meunier	Liberal
27th	1962–1966	Jean Meunier	Liberal
28th	1966–1970	Paul-Émile Sauvageau	Union Nationale
29th	1970–1973	Camille Laurin	Parti Québécois
30th	1973–1976	Jean Boudreault	Liberal
31st	1976–1981	Camille Laurin	Parti Québécois
32nd	1981–1985	Camille Laurin	Parti Québécois
33rd	1985–1989	Claude Trudel	Liberal
34th	1989–1994	Huguette Boucher-Bacon	Liberal
35th	1994–1998	Camille Laurin	Parti Québécois
36th	1998–2003	Diane Lemieux	Parti Québécois
37th	2003–2007	Diane Lemieux	Parti Québécois
38th	2007–2007	Diane Lemieux	Parti Québécois
38th	2008–2008	Maka Kotto	Parti Québécois
39th	2008–2012	Maka Kotto	Parti Québécois
40th	2012–2014	Maka Kotto	Parti Québécois
41st	2014–2018	Maka Kotto	Parti Québécois
42nd	2018–2022	Richard Campeau	Coalition Avenir Québec
Camille-Laurin
43rd	2022–2026	Paul St-Pierre Plamondon	Parti Québécois
44th	2026–Present	Paul St-Pierre Plamondon	Parti Québécois

== Election results ==
2026 Quebec general election
** Preliminary results — Not yet official **
Party	Candidate	Votes	%	±%
Parti Québécois	Paul St-Pierre Plamondon	12,229	39.66	–2.02
Liberal	Earl Corales	6,806	22.07	+5.61
Québec solidaire	René Gauvreau	6,247	20.26	N/A
Coalition Avenir Québec	Matys Lavigne	2,688	8.72	–23.23
Conservative	Jessy Comtois	2,371	7.69	+1.17
Parti nul	Chantal Poulin	276	0.90	N/A
Climat Québec	Benoît Dupont	171	0.55	–0.29
Équipe Autonomiste	Louis Chandonnet	47	0.15	+0.01
Total valid votes		30,835	98.44	+7.12
Total rejected ballots		489	1.56	–7.12
Turnout		31,324	63.37	–0.08
Electors on the lists		49,429		
Parti Québécois hold		Swing		–3.82
Source: Élections Québec

2022 Quebec general election
Party	Candidate	Votes	%	±%
Parti Québécois	Paul St-Pierre Plamondon	11,959	41.68	+17.21
Coalition Avenir Québec	Richard Campeau	9,165	31.94	-15.09
Liberal	Christina Eyangos	4,724	16.47	+3.62
Conservative	Christos Karteris	1,869	6.51	+5.55
Green	Bourama Keita	641	2.23	-0.00
Climat Québec	Jean-Pierre Émond	241	0.84	–
Démocratie directe	Grace St-Gelais	49	0.17	–
Équipe Autonomiste	Charles Mc Nicoll	42	0.15	–
Québec solidaire	Marie-Eve Rancourt	0	0.00	–
Total valid votes		28,690	91.32	–
Total rejected ballots		2,728	8.68	+6.87
Turnout		31,418	63.45	-1.47
Electors on the lists		49,518	–	–
Parti Québécois gain from Coalition Avenir Québec		Swing		+5.65

2018 Quebec general election: Bourget
Party	Candidate	Votes	%	±%
Coalition Avenir Québec	Richard Campeau	8,870	27.57	+7.93
Parti Québécois	Maka Kotto	8,370	26.01	-11.77
Québec solidaire	Marlène Lessard	7,865	24.44	+13.24
Liberal	Vincent Girard	6,074	18.88	-9.98
Green	Marieke Hassell-Crépeau	719	2.23	+0.75
Citoyens au pouvoir	Dany Roy	200	0.62	
Marxist–Leninist	Claude Brunelle	80	0.25	-0.05
Total valid votes		32,178	98.19	
Total rejected ballots		594	1.81	
Turnout		32,772	64.92	
Eligible voters		50,481		
Coalition Avenir Québec gain from Parti Québécois		Swing		+9.85
Source(s) "Rapport des résultats officiels du scrutin". Élections Québec.

2014 Quebec general election
Party	Candidate	Votes	%	±%
Parti Québécois	Maka Kotto	12,525	37.78	-7.90
Liberal	Jean-Pierre Gagnon	9,567	28.86	+9.45
Coalition Avenir Québec	Sylvain Medza	6,510	19.64	-1.29
Québec solidaire	Gaétan Chateauneuf	3,714	11.20	+1.77
Green	Thomas Lapierre	489	1.48	-0.02
Option nationale	Diego Saavedra Renaud	243	0.73	-1.23
Marxist–Leninist	Claude Brunelle	101	0.30	+0.11
Total valid votes		33,149	98.29	–
Total rejected ballots		577	1.71	–
Turnout		33,726	68	+22.26
Electors on the lists		49,334	–	–

2012 Quebec general election: Bourget
Party	Candidate	Votes	%	±%
Parti Québécois	Maka Kotto	16,379	45.68	−4.51
Coalition Avenir Québec	Mario Bentrovato	7,503	20.93	+10.60
Liberal	Dave McMahon	6,960	19.41	−11.40
Québec solidaire	Patrice Gagnon	3,381	9.43	+4.88
Option nationale	Paolo Zambito	702	1.96	–
Green	Gilbert Caron	537	1.50	−2.12
Parti indépendantiste	Sylvie Tremblay	199	0.57	+0.08
Coalition pour la constituante	Jan Stohl	70	0.20	–
Marxist–Leninist	Claude Brunelle	68	0.19	–
Unité Nationale	Gaston Savard	57	0.16	–
Total valid votes		35,856	98.64	–
Total rejected ballots		495	1.36	–
Turnout		36,351	74%	−6.0
Electors on the lists		48,998	–	–

2008 Quebec general election: Bourget
Party	Candidate	Votes	%	±%
Parti Québécois	Maka Kotto	13,007	50.19	+9.53
Liberal	Pierre Mac Nicoll	7,984	30.81	−1.11
Action démocratique	Guy Boutin	2,677	10.33	+0.93
Québec solidaire	Gaétan Legault	1,180	4.55	+0.22
Green	Gilbert Caron	939	3.62	−7.75
Parti indépendantiste	Antonis Labbé	127	0.49	−1.84
Total valid votes		25,914	98.33	
Total rejected ballots		439	1.67	
Turnout		26,353	55.56	
Electors on the lists		47,434		
Source: Official Results, Le Directeur général des élections du Québec.

Quebec provincial by-election, May 12, 2008: Bourget
Party	Candidate	Votes	%	±%
Parti Québécois	Maka Kotto	6,575	40.66	−0.60
Liberal	Lyn Thériault	5,161	31.92	+9.07
Green	Scott McKay	1,839	11.37	+3.28
Action démocratique	Denis Mondor	1,520	9.40	−13.61
Québec solidaire	Gaétan Legault	700	4.33	+0.14
Parti indépendantiste	Richard Gervais	376	2.33	–
Total valid votes		16,171	99.01	–
Total rejected ballots		162	0.99	–
Turnout		16,333	34.55	−35.34
Electors on the lists		47,276	–	–
Source: Official Results, Le Directeur général des élections du Québec.

2007 Quebec general election: Bourget
Party	Candidate	Votes	%	±%
Parti Québécois	Diane Lemieux	13,422	41.26	−4.16
Action démocratique	Clairmont De La Croizetière	7,487	23.01	+5.70
Liberal	Pierre Carrier	7,433	22.85	−11.17
Green	Scott McKay	2,632	8.09	-
Québec solidaire	Lynda Gadoury	1,363	4.19	+2.93*
Christian Democracy	Claudette Deschamps	195	0.60	+0.02
Total valid votes		32,532	98.81	
Total rejected ballots		391	1.19	
Turnout		32,923	69.89	
Electors on the lists		47,108		
Increase is from UFP

1998 Quebec general election: Bourget
Party	Candidate	Votes	%	±%
Parti Québécois	Diane Lemieux	13,056	47.73	
Liberal	Huguette Boucher Bacon	10,951	40.03	
Action démocratique	Bertrand Morel	2,899	10.60	
Socialist Democracy	Sylvain Desjardins	185	0.68	
Communist	Pierre Bibeau	115	0.42	
Marxist–Leninist	Hélène Héroux	89	0.33	
Innovator	André Provost	61	0.22	
Total valid votes		27,356	100.00	
Rejected and declined votes		312		
Turnout		27,668	79.54	
Electors on the lists		34,783		
Source: Official Results, Le Directeur général des élections du Québec.

== See also ==
- List of Quebec provincial electoral districts
- Canadian provincial electoral districts

National Assembly of Quebec
Preceded by Sanguinet	Constituency represented by the premier 2026–present	Incumbent
