= Collectif pour la réussite et l'épanouissement de l'enfant =

The Collectif pour la réussite et l'épanouissement de l'enfant (CRÉE) was a short-lived political party in the educational system of Montreal, Quebec, Canada. It contested the 2003 school commission elections for the Commission scolaire de Montréal (CSM), the primary francophone board in Montreal, and saw three of its candidates elected.

CRÉE was founded in September 2003 as a successor party to the Regroupement scolaire confessionnel (RSC). The RSC had been defeated in the 1998 school commission elections, but formed a majority on the commission the following year in alliance with five defectors from the governing Mouvement pour une école moderne et ouverte (MEMO) party. CRÉE's founders included both RSC members and MEMO defectors; its leader was former MEMO commissioner Marcellin Noël.

The party's electoral platform focused on what party leaders described as the personal development of schoolchildren. CRÉE promised to improve French-language education and to introduce English-language instruction as early as the first grade; it also pledged that special attention would be given to boys in public schools and promised to encourage the creation of boys-only classes. CRÉE emphasized that, unlike MEMO, it was not connected to any federal or provincial party.

MEMO won a landslide victory in the 2003 elections, taking eighteen of twenty-one seats. The only CRÉE candidates returned were Viken Afarian, Lyn Faust, and Gérald Morel. All served in opposition for the next four years, though the party itself seems to have become dormant. Both Faust and Morel stood down at the 2007 elections; Afarian sought re-election as an independent candidate and was defeated.
