= Montreal Island School Council =

Canadian education organization, 1973–2002

The Montreal Island School Council was an administrative organization in the education system of Montreal, Quebec, Canada. It was created by the government of Quebec in 1973 and abolished in 2002.

The council was established by the government of Robert Bourassa to administer the education reforms that would follow passage of Quebec's Official Language Act. Council members were initially appointed by the provincial government, although in later years they were appointed by the various school boards on the Island of Montreal. By the end of the council's existence, its primary responsibility was to facilitate tax collection and distribute revenue to schools with low-income students. Its budget in 2002 was $5.4 million, of which $2.2 million was directed toward tax collection.

In late 2002, Education minister Sylvain Simard oversaw passage of a bill abolishing the council and replacing it with a seven-member committee comprising the directors-general of Montreal's five school boards and two representatives of the province's education department. Some council members charged that Simard's decision was intended as punishment for the council's refusal the previous year to implement a provincial directive to raise taxes. Simard rejected this, arguing that the council's abolition would save $900,000 and that the replacement committee could better facilitate the redistribution of funds. He also noted that the Commission scolaire de Montréal and the Commission scolaire de la Pointe-de-l'Île had previously called for the council to be abolished.
