= Richard Campeau (politician) =

Canadian politician

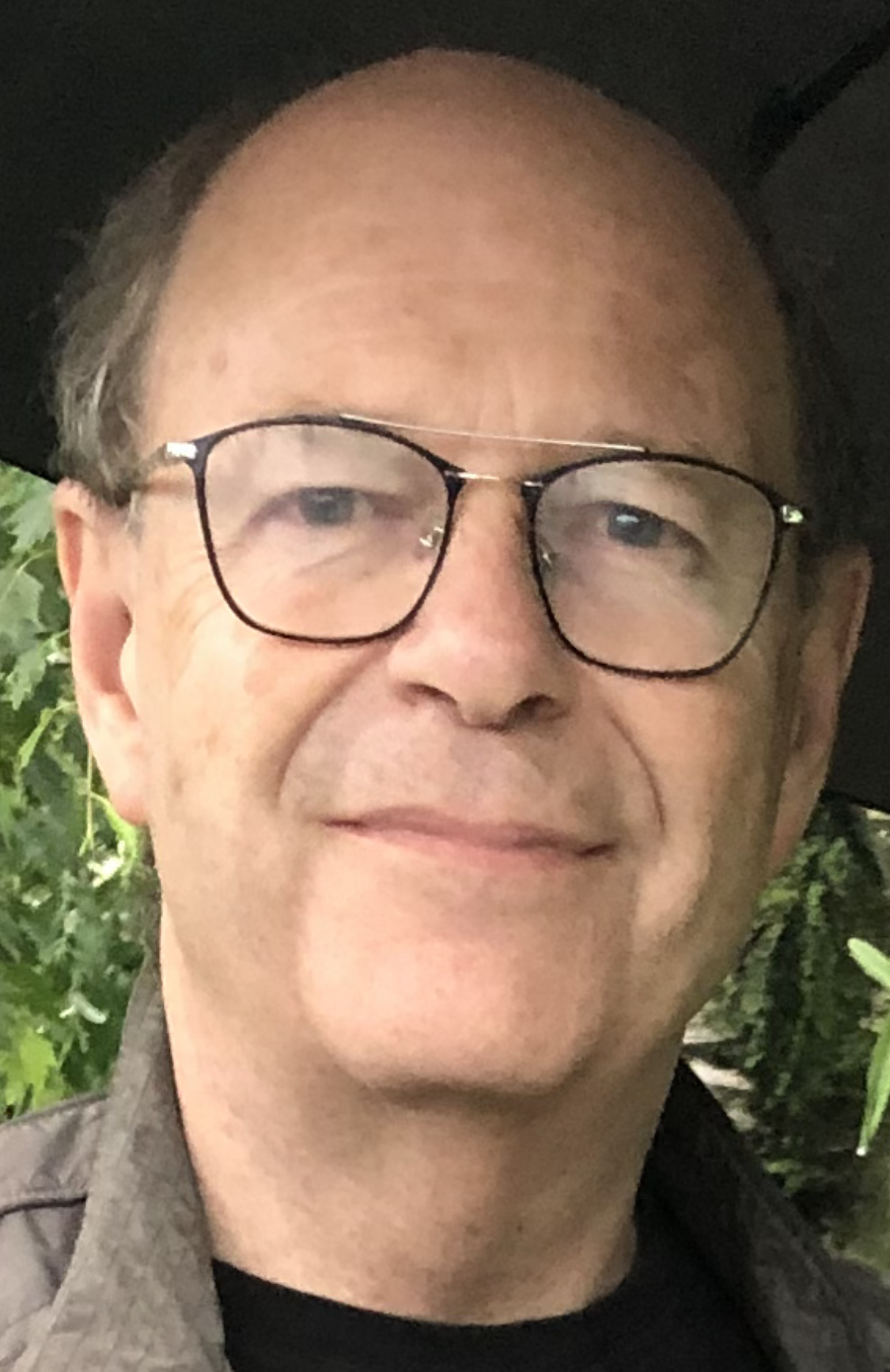
- Richard Campeau in 2022

Member of the National Assembly of Quebec for Bourget
- In office October 1, 2018 – August 28, 2022
- Preceded by: Maka Kotto
- Succeeded by: Paul St-Pierre Plamondon

Personal details
- Born: February 12, 1954 (age 72)
- Party: Coalition Avenir Québec

Richard Campeau (born February 12, 1954) is a Canadian politician, who was elected to the National Assembly of Quebec in the 2018 provincial election. He represented the electoral district of Bourget as a member of the Coalition Avenir Québec until the 2022 election, where he was defeated by Parti Québecois leader Paul St-Pierre Plamondon.

== Electoral record ==
2022 Quebec general election: Camille-Laurin
Party	Candidate	Votes	%	±%
Parti Québécois	Paul St-Pierre Plamondon	11,959	41.68	+17.21
Coalition Avenir Québec	Richard Campeau	9,165	31.94	-15.09
Liberal	Christina Eyangos	4,724	16.47	+3.62
Conservative	Christos Karteris	1,869	6.51	+5.55
Green	Bourama Keita	641	2.23	-0.00
Climat Québec	Jean-Pierre Émond	241	0.84	–
Démocratie directe	Grace St-Gelais	49	0.17	–
Équipe Autonomiste	Charles Mc Nicoll	42	0.15	–
Québec solidaire	Marie-Eve Rancourt	0	0.00	–
Total valid votes		28,690	91.32	–
Total rejected ballots		2,728	8.68	+6.87
Turnout		31,418	63.45	-1.47
Electors on the lists		49,518	–	–
Parti Québécois gain from Coalition Avenir Québec		Swing		+5.65

2018 Quebec general election: Bourget
Party	Candidate	Votes	%	±%
Coalition Avenir Québec	Richard Campeau	8,870	27.57	+7.93
Parti Québécois	Maka Kotto	8,370	26.01	-11.77
Québec solidaire	Marlène Lessard	7,865	24.44	+13.24
Liberal	Vincent Girard	6,074	18.88	-9.98
Green	Marieke Hassell-Crépeau	719	2.23	+0.75
Citoyens au pouvoir	Dany Roy	200	0.62	
Marxist–Leninist	Claude Brunelle	80	0.25	-0.05
Total valid votes		32,178	98.19	
Total rejected ballots		594	1.81	
Turnout		32,772	64.92	
Eligible voters		50,481		
Coalition Avenir Québec gain from Parti Québécois		Swing		+9.85
Source(s) "Rapport des résultats officiels du scrutin". Élections Québec.

2014 Quebec general election: Anjou–Louis-Riel
Party	Candidate	Votes	%	±%
Liberal	Lise Thériault	16,049	50.81	+10.69
Parti Québécois	Yasmina Chouakri	7,326	23.19	-7.78
Coalition Avenir Québec	Richard Campeau	5,315	16.83	-2.9
Québec solidaire	Marlène Lessard	2,448	7.75	+0.48
Green	Annibal Teclou	303	0.96	–
Option nationale	Raphaël Couture	147	0.47	-0.79
Total valid votes		31,588	98.58	–
Total rejected ballots		454	1.42	–
Turnout		32,042	73.29	-2.04
Electors on the lists		43,718	–	–
Liberal hold		Swing		–

2012 Quebec general election: Anjou–Louis-Riel
Party	Candidate	Votes	%	±%
Liberal	Lise Thériault	12,953	40.12	-10.32
Parti Québécois	Martine Roux	9,998	30.97	-3.47
Coalition Avenir Québec	Richard Campeau	6,371	19.73	+11.05
Québec solidaire	Marlène Lessard	2,347	7.27	+3.63
Option nationale	Raphaël Couture	407	1.26	
Coalition pour la constituante	Samuel Stohl	113	0.35	
Marxist–Leninist	Linda Sullivan	99	0.31	
Total valid votes		32,288	98.64	–
Total rejected ballots		446	1.36	–
Turnout		32,734	75.33	
Electors on the lists		43,456	–	–
Liberal hold		Swing		-3.43
