= Anjou–Louis-Riel =

Provincial electoral district in Quebec, Canada

Coordinates: 45.60°N 73.60°W

Quebec electoral district
- Location in Montreal

Provincial electoral district
- Legislature: National Assembly of Quebec
MNA
Nicolas Plourde
Liberal
- District created: 1972
- First contested: 1973
- Last contested: 2026

Demographics
- Population (2006): 61,323
- Electors (2014): 43,718
- Area (km²): 17.5
- Pop. density (per km²): 3,504.2
- Census division: Montreal (part)
- Census subdivision: Montreal (part)

Anjou–Louis-Riel is a provincial electoral district in Quebec, Canada, that elects members to the National Assembly of Quebec. It is located in northern Montreal and consists of the entire Anjou borough of Montreal plus a part of the Mercier–Hochelaga-Maisonneuve borough.

The riding was created in 1972 under the name Anjou. For the 2012 election, it was renamed to Anjou–Louis-Riel, but its territory was unchanged.

== Members of the National Assembly ==
Legislature	Years	Member	Party
Anjou
30th	1973–1976	Yves Tardif	Liberal
31st	1976–1981	Pierre-Marc Johnson	Parti Québécois
32nd	1981–1985	Pierre-Marc Johnson	Parti Québécois
33rd	1985–1987	Pierre-Marc Johnson	Parti Québécois
33rd	1988–1989	René Serge Larouche	Liberal
34th	1989–1990	René Serge Larouche	Liberal
34th	1990–1991	René Serge Larouche	Independent
34th	1992–1994	Pierre Bélanger	Parti Québécois
35th	1994–1998	Pierre Bélanger	Parti Québécois
36th	1998–2001	Jean-Sébastien Lamoureux	Liberal
36th	2002–2003	Lise Thériault	Liberal
37th	2003–2007	Lise Thériault	Liberal
38th	2007–2008	Lise Thériault	Liberal
39th	2008–2012	Lise Thériault	Liberal
Anjou–Louis-Riel
40th	2012–2014	Lise Thériault	Liberal
41st	2014–2018	Lise Thériault	Liberal
42nd	2018–2022	Lise Thériault	Liberal
43rd	2022–2026	Karine Boivin Roy	Coalition Avenir Québec
44th	2026–Present	Nicolas Plourde	Liberal

== Election results ==
=== Anjou–Louis-Riel, 2011–present ===
2026 Quebec general election
** Preliminary results — Not yet official **
Party	Candidate	Votes	%	±%
Liberal	Nicolas Plourde	10,242	40.05	+9.53
Parti Québécois	Younès Dadoun	5,329	20.84	+9.80
Québec solidaire	Edissya Boukrif	3,733	14.60	–0.17
Coalition Avenir Québec	Karine Boivin Roy	3,572	13.97	–21.59
Conservative	Helder Da Costa Leitao	2,405	9.40	+2.24
Climat Québec	Claude Gélinas	151	0.59	–0.18
Parti nul	Francis Desjardins	142	0.56	N/A
Total valid votes		25,574	98.20	–0.21
Total rejected ballots		469	1.80	+0.21
Turnout		26,043	62.68	–1.17
Electors on the lists		41,546		
Liberal gain from Coalition Avenir Québec		Swing		–0.14
Source: Élections Québec

2022 Quebec general election
Party	Candidate	Votes	%	±%
Coalition Avenir Québec	Karine Boivin Roy	9,376	35.56	+6.65
Liberal	Chantal Gagnon	8,045	30.52	-8.55
Québec solidaire	Laurence Pageau	3,893	14.77	+0.24
Parti Québécois	Yastene Adda	2,910	11.04	-3.66
Conservative	Geneviève Deneault	1,887	7.16	–
Climat Québec	Claude Gélinas	203	0.77	–
Independent	Katy LeRougetel	49	0.19	–
Total valid votes		26,363	98.41	–
Total rejected ballots		427	1.59	-0.20
Turnout		26,790	63.85	-0.63
Electors on the lists		41,956	–	–
Coalition Avenir Québec gain from Liberal		Swing		+7.60

2018 Quebec general election
Party	Candidate	Votes	%	±%
Liberal	Lise Thériault	10,802	39.06	-11.75
Coalition Avenir Québec	Michèle Gamelin	7,995	28.91	+12.08
Parti Québécois	Karl Dugal	4,064	14.70	-8.50
Québec solidaire	Marie-Josée Forget	4,018	14.53	+6.78
Green	Hamza Madani	519	1.88	+0.92
New Democratic	Vincent Henes	256	0.93	–
Total valid votes		27,654	98.21	
Total rejected ballots		505	1.79	+0.38
Turnout		28,159	64.49	-8.81
Eligible voters		43,666		
Liberal hold		Swing		-11.92
Source(s) "Rapport des résultats officiels du scrutin". Élections Québec.

2014 Quebec general election
Party	Candidate	Votes	%	±%
Liberal	Lise Thériault	16,049	50.81	+10.69
Parti Québécois	Yasmina Chouakri	7,326	23.19	-7.78
Coalition Avenir Québec	Richard Campeau	5,315	16.83	-2.9
Québec solidaire	Marlène Lessard	2,448	7.75	+0.48
Green	Annibal Teclou	303	0.96	–
Option nationale	Raphaël Couture	147	0.47	-0.79
Total valid votes		31,588	98.58	–
Total rejected ballots		454	1.42	–
Turnout		32,042	73.29	-2.04
Electors on the lists		43,718	–	–
Liberal hold		Swing		–

2012 Quebec general election
Party	Candidate	Votes	%	±%
Liberal	Lise Thériault	12,953	40.12	-10.32
Parti Québécois	Martine Roux	9,998	30.97	-3.47
Coalition Avenir Québec	Richard Campeau	6,371	19.73	+11.05
Québec solidaire	Marlène Lessard	2,347	7.27	+3.63
Option nationale	Raphaël Couture	407	1.26	–
Coalition pour la constituante	Samuel Stohl	113	0.35	–
Marxist–Leninist	Linda Sullivan	99	0.31	–
Total valid votes		32,288	98.64	–
Total rejected ballots		446	1.36	–
Turnout		32,734	75.33	
Electors on the lists		43,456	–	–
Liberal hold		Swing		-3.43

^ Change is from redistributed results. CAQ change is from ADQ.

=== Anjou, 1972–2011 ===
2008 Quebec general election: Anjou
Party	Candidate	Votes	%
Liberal	Lise Thériault	13,082	50.44
Parti Québécois	Sébastien Richard	8,930	34.43
Action démocratique	Jacques Lachapelle	2,252	8.68
Québec solidaire	Francine Gagné	944	3.64
Green	Sylvie Morneau	727	2.80
Total valid votes		25,935	98.54
Total rejected ballots		385	1.46
Turnout		26,320	58.88
Electors		44,703	

2007 Quebec general election: Anjou
Party	Candidate	Votes	%
Liberal	Lise Thériault	13,280	41.36
Parti Québécois	Sébastien Richard	8,795	27.39
Action démocratique	Lorraine Laperrière	7,409	23.07
Green	Alain Bissonnette	1,376	4.29
Québec solidaire	Francine Gagné	1,151	3.58
Marxist–Leninist	Hélène Héroux	99	0.31
Total valid votes		32,110	98.97
Total rejected ballots		333	1.03
Turnout		32,443	72.04
Electors		45,034	
Source: Official Results, Le Directeur général des élections du Québec.

2003 Quebec general election: Anjou
Party	Candidate	Votes	%
Liberal	Lise Thériault	17,572	53.69
Parti Québécois	France Bachand	10,573	32.30
Action démocratique	Martin Janson	4,319	13.20
Marxist–Leninist	Hélène Héroux	266	0.81
Total valid votes		32,730	98.46
Rejected and declined votes		513	1.54
Turnout		33,243	73.30
Electors on the lists		45,350	
Source: Official Results, Le Directeur général des élections du Québec.

Quebec provincial by-election, April 15, 2002: Anjou
Party	Candidate	Votes	%
Liberal	Lise Thériault	8,845	54.59
Parti Québécois	Aude Vézina	4,275	26.38
Action démocratique	Nathalie Proulx	2,848	17.58
Green	David Hamel	163	1.01
Independent	Régent Millette	72	0.44
Total valid votes		16,203	98.91
Rejected and declined votes		178	1.09
Turnout		16,381	46.62
Electors on the lists		35,134	
Source: Official Results, Le Directeur général des élections du Québec.

1998 Quebec general election: Anjou
Party	Candidate	Votes	%
Liberal	Jean-Sébastien Lamoureux	12,097	44.51
Parti Québécois	Pierre Bélanger	11,954	43.98
Action démocratique	Michel Lalonde	2,825	10.39
Socialist Democracy	Bernard Beaulieu	192	0.71
Innovator	Roberto Barba	68	0.25
Communist	Teresa Vergara	44	0.16
Total valid votes		27,180	98.61
Total rejected ballots		384	1.39
Turnout		27,564	82.31
Electors		33,488	
Source: Official Results, Le Directeur général des élections du Québec.

1995 Quebec referendum
Side	Votes	%
Non	15,722	50.49
Oui	15,415	49.51

1994 Quebec general election: Anjou
Party	Candidate	Votes	%
Parti Québécois	Pierre Bélanger	12,453	46.60
Liberal	Richard Quirion	11,697	43.77
Action démocratique	Michel Lalonde	1,753	6.56
New Democratic	Richard Duval	537	2.01
Natural Law	Gilles Raymond	188	0.70
Innovator	Nicole Migneault	98	0.37
Total valid votes		26,726	98.02
Total rejected ballots		539	1.98
Turnout		27,265	85.53
Electors		31,878	
Source: Official Results, Le Directeur général des élections du Québec.

1992 Charlottetown Accord referendum
Side	Votes	%
Non	15,672	56.65
Oui	11,993	43.35

Quebec provincial by-election, January 20, 1992: Anjou
Party	Candidate	Votes	%
Parti Québécois	Pierre Bélanger	8,619	52.14
Liberal	Charlotte Goudreault	7,342	44.41
New Democratic	Daniel Boucher	283	1.71
Independent	Patrice Fortin	143	0.87
United Social Credit	Emilien Martel	61	0.37
N/A (Communist League)	Michel Prairie	45	0.27
Independent	Jolly Taylor	38	0.23
Total valid votes		16,531	98.73
Total rejected ballots		213	1.27
Turnout		16,744	57.65
Electors		29,043	
Source: Official Results, Le Directeur général des élections du Québec.

== See also ==
- List of Ontario provincial electoral districts
- Canadian provincial electoral districts
