= Mouvement pour une école moderne et ouverte =

The Mouvement pour une école moderne et ouverte (MÉMO) is a political party in the educational system of Montreal, Quebec, Canada. It has governed the Commission scolaire de Montréal (CSDM) since the commission's founding in 1998.

== Origins ==
MÉMO was founded in August 1987 to contest that year's elections for the Montreal Catholic School Commission (MCSC). The party was secular and progressive in its orientation, and its primary goal was replacing Quebec's denominational school boards with boards based on language. MÉMO's first president was Marie-France Cloutier, who argued that the MCSC's promotion of Roman Catholic education and values had created an exclusionary climate.

MÉMO was supported in the 1987 elections by the Montreal branch of the Parti Québécois (PQ). The party won four out of nineteen seats. This was regarded by many as a moral victory, in that it marked the first time in several years that an organized opposition movement had won any credible representation on the commission.

== In opposition, on the Montreal Catholic School Commission ==
1987–90

MÉMO served as the official opposition to Michel Pallascio's conservative board executive from 1987 to 1990.

In April 1990, one MÉMO commissioner criticized Pallascio's board for passing a resolution mandating that school principals be required to uphold "Christian values." In the same period, the party reiterated its belief that only linguistic school boards could bring about improved cultural relations.

1990–94

In the 1990 school board elections, new MÉMO leader Kenneth George called for the MCSC to be restructured as a francophone board and for its English-speaking students to be transferred to a new Montreal-wide anglophone board. In this campaign, the party was endorsed by diverse persons and groups such as Montreal mayor Jean Doré, the Parti Québécois, and the English-language Montreal Gazette newspaper. The party won nine seats on the expanded twenty-one member board, against eleven for Pallascio's governing Regroupement scolaire confessionnel (RSC) and one for a MÉMO-aligned independent. Pallascio was personally defeated by a MÉMO candidate. George resigned as leader after the elections and was replaced on a temporary basis by Yves Poulin; Diane De Courcy became the party's full-time leader the following year.

The Montreal Catholic School Commission was marked by strong partisan divisions in the early 1990s. In 1991, a MÉMO representative proposed the introduction of condom machines to the commission's high schools; this was voted down by the RSC. Later in the same year, most MÉMO representatives supported an unsuccessful motion to have the Canadian flag removed from the commission room. The Quebec government put the board under a six-month partial trusteeship in 1992, after MÉMO and the RSC were unable to agree on the board's next director-general (whose appointment required a two-thirds majority).

During this period, some critics argued that MÉMO's support for a francophone school board caused it to ignore the concerns of anglophone students. A representative of the MCSC's English sector said "there was definitely a pattern" of the party working against real or perceived gains by his department, though he added that this was based on MÉMO's strategic goals and not by malice. MÉMO said that its policies were not intended to be anti-English.

The Montreal Catholic School Commission unexpectedly endorsed MÉMO's proposal for linguistic boards in June 1994, when two RSC members broke ranks to support an opposition motion on the issue. This helped bring about the dissolution of the MCSC and its replacement in 1998 by the Commission scolaire de Montréal.

1994–98

The last election for the Montreal Catholic School Commission was held in 1994. MÉMO ran on a platform of targeting high dropout rates and corrupt administration; it also called for a moratorium on school board restructuring until after a planned referendum on Quebec independence, so as to avoid confusion over Quebec's constitutional responsibilities for education. MÉMO won ten seats, compared with nine for the RSC and two for a new group called the Commissaires unis pour un renouveau scolaire (COURS). The RSC and COURS later formed a coalition, and MÉMO remained in opposition for the next four years.

MÉMO supported the Quebec sovereignty option in Quebec's 1995 referendum on independence, arguing that sovereignty would help to eliminate "privileged treatment" for anglophones in both the MCSC and the Protestant School Board of Greater Montreal. The two boards in question responded by accusing MÉMO of pitting anglophone students against their francophone counterparts. All elected MÉMO representatives indicated their personal support for sovereignty, which was narrowly defeated by Quebec voters.

In early 1998, MÉMO unsuccessfully sought to have two English schools in west-end Montreal re-designated for the proposed francophone board. MÉMO argued that the transfer would help correct a $74 million imbalance in the value of buildings exchanged between the Catholic and Protestant boards in anticipation of their replacement by linguistic boards. The MCSC executive responded that MÉMO was trying to start a "linguistic war" for electoral purposes and that the re-designation would have been illegal in any event.

== Governing party on the Commission scolaire de Montréal ==
MÉMO won fourteen seats in the 1998 Commission scolaire de Montreal election, as against only seven for the RSC. MÉMO leader Diane De Courcy, who was chosen to chair the new commission, described the result as "a big change toward modernity — finally."

Following the election, De Courcy reiterated her party's request for $74 million worth of school buildings to be transferred from anglophone schools to the CSM. She was quoted as saying, "It doesn't bother me if it happens over two or three years. I have the interests of English students just as much at heart as the interests of French students." Subsequently, MÉMO also became involved in bitter quarrel with Montreal's four other school boards over control of the Montreal Island School Council.

In 1999, five of MÉMO's elected commissioners defected from the party to sit as independents in alliance with the RSC. This gave the opposition a majority on the commission, and, on September 1, the board voted to dismiss all members of the executive committee, including De Courcy. An independent investigator later determined that this dismissal had put the board in an illegal situation, and the provincial government imposed partial trusteeship over the CSM on September 29. De Courcy welcomed the government's intervention and argued that her opponents were motivated by a personal vendetta. She was subsequently re-confirmed in office, but for the next three years was forced to run the board in a minority situation. In October 2000, opposition members succeeded in removing MÉMO representatives from most positions on the CSM's committees.

In the buildup to the 2003 Commission scolaire de Montreal election, outgoing MÉMO councillor Robert Cadotte accused the PQ of effecting a takeover of the party. Although he himself was a PQ member, Cadotte said that he regarded the mixing of provincial and school board politics as dangerous. MÉMO won eighteen seats in this election, against three for a new grouping called the Collectif pour la réussite et l'épanouissement de l'enfant (CRÉE). This finally gave the party a secure majority, which it held for the next four years.

MÉMO won all twenty-one seats on the CSM in 2007, and Diane De Courcy continued as chair of the board.

In 2014 MÉMO won again all positions; chairman or president (Catherine Harel-Bourdon) and the 13 seats.
