= Regroupement scolaire confessionnel =

The Regroupement scolaire confessionnel (RSC) was a political party in the educational system of Montreal, Quebec, Canada, from 1990 to 2003. The party governed the Montreal Catholic School Commission (MCSC) from 1990 to 1998 and later formed the official opposition on the successor Commission scolaire de Montréal (CSDM).

== Origins ==
The RSC was founded in 1990 by twelve sitting commissioners, including MCSC chair Michel Pallascio, as a vehicle to contest the 1990 elections. It was supported by the Mouvement scolaire confessionnel (MSC), a coalition of Roman Catholic groups that had dominated school commission politics since 1973 by endorsing candidates on an individual basis. One opposition commissioner described the RSC's creation as nothing more than a change in name, saying that it represented the same conservative ideology as the MSC.

The RSC supported the continuation of Quebec's denominational school system, at a time when the opposition Mouvement pour une école moderne et ouverte (MÉMO) favoured a change to language-based boards. Pallascio argued that his party was focused on the preservation of Quebec's language, religion, and traditions, while opponents described it as reactionary and arch-conservative in its religious views. Some opponents also accused the RSC of intolerance toward minority communities and of ignoring issues such as school violence and sex education.

During the 1990 school board elections, Pallascio argued that Quebec should favour immigration from Europe over other parts of the world, saying that persons "who do not share [...] Judeo-Christian values" would be more difficult to integrate into Quebec society. This statement was widely criticized; an editorial in the Montreal Gazette described the RSC as "display[ing] the repugnant instincts of an archaic clique."

== Governance ==
The RSC won a narrow victory in the 1990 school board elections, taking 11 out of 21 seats. MÉMO won nine seats and the remaining seat went to an independent. Pallascio was personally defeated in his district, although he continued as RSC party leader after the election. RSC member Denise Soucy-Brousseau was chosen to be Pallascio's successor as chair of the commission and served for a year before resigning amid controversy. She was replaced by Francois Ouimet.

In 1991, the RSC voted down an opposition motion that would have put condom machines in the commission's high schools. The following year, it abolished four school committees (general management, administrative issues, teaching methods, and the English sector) that had been in place since 1980, as part of what Ouimet described as a shift of powers from management to elected officials. Opponents charged that the restructuring was organized in secrecy, without any real consultation.

Quebec education minister Michel Pagé put the MCSC in partial trusteeship in March 1992, after an extended period of deadlock over the appointment of a new director-general (which required two-thirds majority support from commissioners). Both the RSC and MÉMO criticized this decision. The matter was resolved in September 1992, when Yves Archambault was appointed to the position by a unanimous vote.

The RSC lost its majority in the 1994 elections, falling to nine seats against ten for MÉMO and two for a new group called the Commissaires unis pour un renouveau scolaire (COURS). The RSC and COURS subsequently formed a coalition and continued to govern the board. Pallascio, who was re-elected to the commission in 1994, was once again chosen serve as chair.

In 1996, Pallascio testified before a hearing on intercultural relations that "Judeo-Christian values" should remain an integral part of Quebec's education system and be accepted by new immigrants. Some groups representing cultural communities criticized this as exclusionary.

== Dissolution ==
Despite opposition from Pallascio and the RSC, the Quebec government passed legislation in 1998 to transform Quebec's denominational boards into linguistic ones. The RSC fielded a full slate of candidates for the newly formed Commission scolaire de Montréal in the 1998 elections, running on a platform of keeping the French-language system dominated by Catholic values. The party was defeated, winning only seven seats against fourteen for MÉMO. Five MÉMO commissioners subsequently defected to the opposition, however, and formed an alliance with the RSC, giving them a de facto majority on council.

Pallascio resigned as RSC leader in 2003, after accepting an appointment to Canada's National Parole Board. The RSC dissolved after this time, and some of its members helped create a new party, the Collectif pour la réussite et l'épanouissement de l'enfant (CRÉE).
