= 2021 Montreal municipal election =

Election in Quebec, Canada

- November 7 2021
- Mayoral election
- November 7, 2021
- Registered: 1,111,100
- Turnout: 38.32%
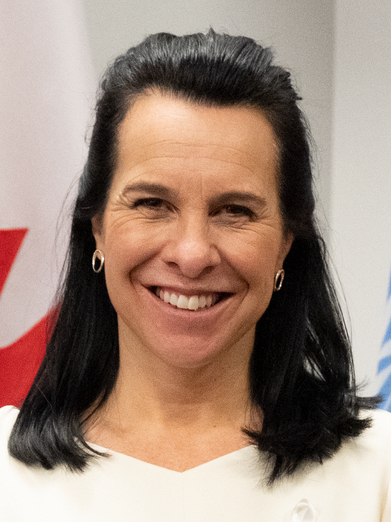

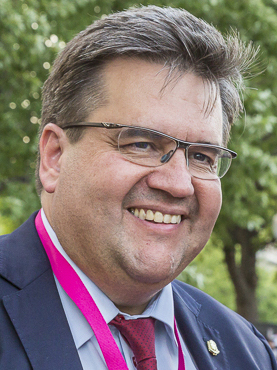

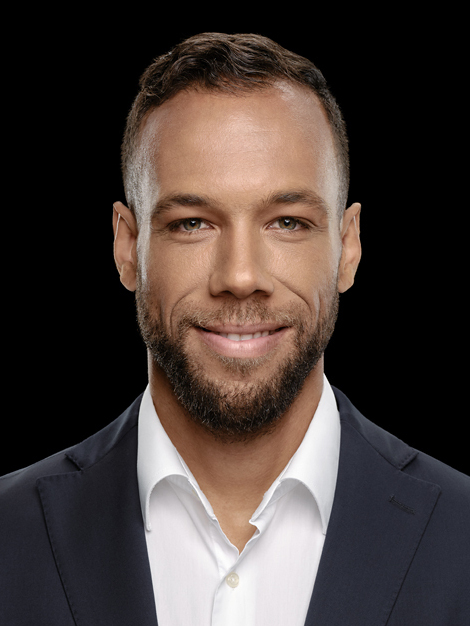
Nominee	Valérie Plante	Denis Coderre	Balarama Holness
Party	Projet Montréal	Ensemble Montréal	Mouvement Montréal
Popular vote	217,986	158,751	30,235
Percentage	52.14%	37.97%	7.23%
Mayor before election
Valérie Plante
Projet Montréal
Elected mayor
Valérie Plante
Projet Montréal
- City Council election
- November 7, 2021
- 65 seats on Montreal City Council (Note: The mayor is a member of City Council, but for the purposes of documentation is treated as their own individual.); 33 seats needed for a majority
Party	Leader	Seats	+/–
Projet Montréal	Valérie Plante	37	+3
Ensemble Montréal	Denis Coderre	23	−2
Équipe LaSalle Team	Nancy Blanchet	3	0
Équipe Anjou	Luis Miranda	2	0
This lists parties that won seats. See the complete results below.

Municipal elections were held in the city of Montreal, Quebec, Canada, on November 7, 2021, as part of the 2021 Quebec municipal elections. Voters elected 103 representatives in a first-past-the-post electoral system. The general election decides the majority composition of the city council and each of the 19 borough councils. The newly elected mayor appoints 2 city councillors for the Ville-Marie borough. In total, 18 borough mayors, 46 city councillors and 38 borough councillors were elected.

Since the previous election, the number of registered political parties has increased, including a number of borough-specific parties.

== Political parties ==
Registered political parties of Montreal
Party	Leader
Action Montréal - Équipe Gilbert Thibodeau	Gilbert Thibodeau
Citoyen.ne.s Outremont	Marc Poulin
Courage - Équipe Sue Montgomery	Sue Montgomery
Engagement pour Montréal	Félix-Antoine Joli-Coeur
Ensemble Montréal - Équipe Denis Coderre	Denis Coderre
Équipe Anjou	Luis Miranda
Équipe CDN - NDG / Team CDN - NDG	Alexander Montagano
Équipe LaSalle Team	Nancy Blanchet
Équité Montréal - Équipe Cloutier	Jean-François Cloutier
Montréal 2021	Luc Ménard
Mouvement Montréal	Balarama Holness
Parti Outremont	Jean-Marc Corbeil
Projet Montréal - Équipe Valérie Plante	Valérie Plante (Incumbent)
Quartiers Montréal	Giuliana Fumagalli
Ralliement pour Montréal	Marc-Antoine Desjardins
Vrai Changement Montréal	Justine McIntyre

== Timeline ==
=== 2017 ===
- November 20 - Jean-François Parenteau, borough mayor of Verdun, leaves Équipe Denis Coderre to sit as an independent, upon taking a position on the executive council.

=== 2018 ===
- January 11 - Équipe Denis Coderre pour Montréal takes on the name Ensemble Montréal.
- April 26 - Hadrien Parizeau, city councillor for the district of Saint-Sulpice, is expelled from Ensemble Montréal and sits as an independent.
- August 3 - Giuliana Fumagalli, borough mayor of Villeray–Saint-Michel–Parc-Extension, is expelled from Projet Montréal and sits as an independent.
- August 17 - Renée-Chantal Belinga, borough councillor for the district of Ovide-Clermont, leaves Ensemble Montréal and sits as an independent.
- August 20 - Marie-Josée Parent, city councillor for the district of Champlain–L'Île-des-Sœurs, leaves Ensemble Montréal and sits as an independent.
- October 1 - Chantal Rouleau, borough mayor of Rivière-des-Prairies–Pointe-aux-Trembles, and Frantz Benjamin, city councillor for the district of Saint-Michel, leave the city council upon being elected to the National Assembly of Quebec.
- October 12 - Giovanni Rapanà, city councillor for the district of Rivière-des-Prairies, leaves Ensemble Montréal to sit as an independent.
- December 16 - In two by-elections, Caroline Bourgeois of Projet Montréal is elected borough mayor of Rivière-des-Prairies–Pointe-aux-Trembles, and Josué Corvil of Ensemble Montréal is elected city councillor for Saint-Michel.

=== 2019 ===
- January 11 - Marvin Rotrand, city councillor for Snowdon, the only member of Coalition Montréal on the council, announces that he will sit as an independent.
- January 28 - Marie-Josée Parent, city councillor for the district of Champlain–L'Île-des-Sœurs, sitting as an independent, joins Projet Montréal.
- March 27 - Lynne Shand, borough councillor for the district of Anjou West, is expelled from Équipe Anjou and sits as an independent.
- April 9 - Cathy Wong, speaker of the city council and city councillor for the district of Peter-McGill, leaves Ensemble Montréal and sits as an independent.
- May 14 - Luc Ferrandez, borough mayor of Le Plateau-Mont-Royal, resigns.
- October 2 - Cathy Wong, speaker of the city council and city councillor for the district of Peter-McGill, sitting as an independent, joins Projet Montréal.
- October 6 - Luc Rabouin of Projet Montréal is elected in a by-election to serve as borough mayor of Le Plateau-Mont-Royal, succeeding Luc Ferrandez.
- October 21 - Patricia Lattanzio, city councillor for the district of Saint-Léonard-Est, leaves the city council upon being elected to the House of Commons of Canada.

=== 2020 ===
- January 24 - Sue Montgomery, borough mayor of Côte-des-Neiges—Notre-Dame-de-Grâce, is expelled from the Projet Montréal caucus after refusing to fire a member of her staff that had been accused of psychological harassment. She sits as an independent.
- October 23 - Julie-Pascale Provost, borough councillor for the district of Du Canal, is expelled from Projet Montréal and sits as an independent.
- December 9 - Christian Arseneault, city councillor for the district of Loyola, leaves Projet Montréal and sits as an independent.
- December 17 - Christine Gosselin, city councillor for the district of Vieux-Rosemont, leaves Projet Montréal and sits as an independent.

=== 2021 ===
- January 26 - Giuliana Fumagalli, borough mayor of Villeray–Saint-Michel–Parc-Extension, sitting as an independent, creates a new party, Quartiers Montréal.
- March 11 - Sue Montgomery, borough mayor of Côte-des-Neiges—Notre-Dame-de-Grâce, sitting as an independent, creates a new party, Courage - Équipe Sue Montgomery.
- March 17 - Jean-Marc Corbeil, borough councillor for the district of Robert-Bourassa, is expelled from Ensemble Montréal and sits as an independent.
- April 21 - Hadrien Parizeau, city councillor for the district of Saint-Sulpice, sitting as an independent, rejoins Ensemble Montréal.
- June 4 - Julie-Pascale Provost, borough councillor for the district of Du Canal, sitting as an independent, joins Ensemble Montréal.
- June 16 - Marvin Rotrand, city councillor for the district of Snowdon, sitting as an independent, joins Ensemble Montréal.
- June 18 - Giovanni Rapanà, city councillor for the district of Rivière-des-Prairies, sitting as an independent, rejoins Ensemble Montréal.
- June 23 - Citoyen.ne.s Outremont allies with Ensemble Montréal.
- July 12 - Équité Montréal allies with Ralliement pour Montréal.
- July 13 - Véronique Tremblay, borough councillor for the district of Champlain–L'Île-des-Sœurs, leaves Ensemble Montréal to join Projet Montréal.
- August 10 - Robert Samoszewski, borough councillor for the district of Jacques-Bizard, leaves Projet Montréal to join Mouvement Montréal.
- August 16 - Christian Arseneault, city councillor for the district of Loyola, announces his resignation.
- September 14 - Équipe Anjou allies with Ensemble Montréal.
- September 17 - Official beginning of the electoral campaign
- September 30 - Ralliement pour Montréal merges with Mouvement Montréal.
- October 1 - Last day of the nomination period: 347 candidates are confirmed by Élections Montréal.
- October 4 - Outremont borough councillor candidate Katchik Ebruchumian withdraws candidacy.
- October 13 - Verdun borough councillor candidate Jean-Pierre Boivin leaves Mouvement Montréal.
- October 15 - Rosemont–La Petite-Patrie city councillor candidate Marc-André Bahl and Verdun borough councillor candidate Jean-Pierre Boivin are expelled from Mouvement Montréal and lose candidacies.
- October 19 - Marc-Antoine Desjardins, leader of Ralliement pour Montréal, announces dropping out of the race for Outremont mayor.
- October 23 - Mercier–Hochelaga-Maisonneuve city councillor candidates Jean-Philippe Martin and Sylvain Medzalabenleth withdraw candidacies.
- October 23 - French mayoral debate opposing Valérie Plante, Denis Coderre and Balarama Holness on LCN
- October 25 - French mayoral debate opposing Valérie Plante and Denis Coderre on ICI Télé and ICI RDI
- October 26 - Outremont borough councillor candidate Dan Kraft withdraws candidacy.
- October 28 - English mayoral debate opposing Valérie Plante, Denis Coderre and Balarama Holness
- October 30 and 31 - Advance poll with a turnout of 12.9% of the registered electors
- November 4 - Craig Sauvé, city councillor for the district of Saint-Henri-Est–Petite-Bourgogne–Pointe-Saint-Charles–Griffintown, withdraws as a Projet Montréal candidate. His party affiliation continues to be listed on the ballot as Projet Montréal but he announces that if elected he will sit as an independent.

== Incumbents not running for re-election ==
Borough	Electoral District	Position	Incumbent	Political Party
Anjou	West	Borough councillor	Lynne Shand	Independent
Côte-des-Neiges–Notre-Dame-de-Grâce	Snowdon	City councillor	Marvin Rotrand	Ensemble Montréal
L'Île-Bizard–Sainte-Geneviève	Denis-Benjamin-Viger	Borough councillor	Christian Larocque	Projet Montréal
L'Île-Bizard–Sainte-Geneviève	Pierre-Foretier	Borough councillor	Yves Sarault	Projet Montréal
Lachine	Du Canal	Borough councillor	Julie-Pascale Provost	Ensemble Montréal
LaSalle	—	Borough mayor	Manon Barbe	Équipe LaSalle Team
LaSalle	Cecil-P.-Newman	City councillor	Lise Zarac	Équipe LaSalle Team
LaSalle	Cecil-P.-Newman	Borough councillor	Serge Declos	Équipe LaSalle Team
Montréal-Nord	Ovide-Clermont	Borough councillor	Renée-Chantal Belinga	Independent
Pierrefonds-Roxboro	Cap-Saint-Jacques	Borough councillor	Yves Gignac	Ensemble Montréal
Le Plateau-Mont-Royal	Mile-End	City councillor	Richard Ryan	Projet Montréal
Rivière-des-Prairies–Pointe-aux-Trembles	La Pointe-aux-Prairies	City councillor	Richard Guay	Ensemble Montréal
Rivière-des-Prairies–Pointe-aux-Trembles	Pointe-aux-Trembles	City councillor	Suzanne Décarie	Ensemble Montréal
Rivière-des-Prairies–Pointe-aux-Trembles	Pointe-aux-Trembles	Borough councillor	Gilles Déziel	Ensemble Montréal
Rosemont–La Petite-Patrie	—	Borough mayor	François William Croteau	Projet Montréal
Rosemont–La Petite-Patrie	Étienne-Desmarteau	City councillor	Stéphanie Watt	Projet Montréal
Rosemont–La Petite-Patrie	Vieux-Rosemont	City councillor	Christine Gosselin	Independent
Saint-Laurent	Côte-de-Liesse	City councillor	Francesco Miele	Ensemble Montréal
Saint-Laurent	Norman-McLaren	Borough councillor	Michèle D. Biron	Ensemble Montréal
Le Sud-Ouest	Saint-Henri-Est–Petite-Bourgogne–Pointe-Saint-Charles–Griffintown	Borough councillor	Sophie Thiébaut	Projet Montréal
Verdun	—	Borough mayor	Jean-François Parenteau	Independent
Verdun	Champlain–L'Île-des-Sœurs	City councillor	Marie-Josée Parent	Projet Montréal
Verdun	Champlain–L'Île-des-Sœurs	Borough councillor	Pierre L'Heureux	Independent
Verdun	Desmarchais-Crawford	Borough councillor	Luc Gagnon	Projet Montréal
Ville-Marie	Peter-McGill	City councillor	Cathy Wong	Projet Montréal
Villeray–Saint-Michel–Parc-Extension	Villeray	City councillor	Rosannie Filato	Projet Montréal

== Mayoral opinion polling ==
Dates	Valérie Plante	Denis Coderre	Balarama Holness	Other	Undecided	Polling firm	Sample size	MoE	Polling method
November 6–7, 2021	51.2%	37.3%	7.1%	2.6%	1.8%	Final result	425 766	—N/a	in-person
November 3–4, 2021	40%	35%	13%	4%	9%	Léger	515	± 4.3%	online
November 2–4, 2021	46%	40%	5%	2%	7%	Mainstreet Research	850	± 3%	online
October 21–26, 2021	36%	36%	12%	6%	9%	Léger	600	—N/a	online
October 9–16, 2021	25%	26%	5%	4%	27%	CROP	1 043	—N/a	hybrid
September 27–30, 2021	36%	35%	10%	6%	13%	Léger	1 001	—N/a	online
September 14–19, 2021	36%	37%	8%	5%	14%	Léger	500	—N/a	online
August 13–24, 2021	27%	34%	9%	11%	19%	CROP	1 000	—N/a	online
May 19–20, 2021	29%	39%	—N/a	16%	16%	Léger	500	± 4.4%	online
March 26–29, 2021	24%	29%	—N/a	10%	37%	SOM	1 070	± 3.6%	online
March 20–23, 2021	24%	40%	—N/a	11%	25%	Mainstreet; Research	2 313	—N/a	online
November 4, 2020	20%	32%	—N/a	21%	27%	Léger	501	± 4.4%	online
August 20–26, 2020	23%	28%	—N/a	18%	31%	CROP	1 200	—N/a	online
November 5, 2017	50.2%	44.6%	—N/a	2.8%	2.4%	Previous result	485 635	—N/a	in-person

== Results ==
Much as with the 2017 Montreal municipal election, early polls were promising for former mayor Denis Coderre, now challenging incumbent mayor Valérie Plante. Despite these, and despite ongoing polling placing the two neck-and-neck, Plante ultimately won the mayoralty with 51.2% of the vote compared to 37.3% for Coderre.

Pending recounts, Projet Montréal also increased its seat total on city council from 34 after the last election to 37 after this one. Projet Montréal won unanimous control of five borough councils and majorities on six more. Ensemble Montréal won unanimous control of five borough councils and majorities on one more. The two remaining boroughs, Anjou and LaSalle, were won unanimously by local parties, Équipe Anjou and Équipe LaSalle Team respectively, the same as last election.

Following his defeat, Denis Coderre announced he would once more resign from political life, leaving his city council seat to his co-candidate Chantal Rossi. On November 16, Aref Salem, councillor for Norman-McLaren district, was announced as interim leader of Ensemble Montréal.

Despite a prominent campaign, Balarama Holness's Mouvement Montréal party failed to win any seats.

=== Recounts ===
There were six requests for judicial recounts.

Borough	Position	Preliminary result	Preliminary margin	Final result	Final margin
Côte-des-Neiges– Notre-Dame-de-Grâce	Borough mayor	Gracia Kasoki Katahwa (Projet)	212	Gracia Kasoki Katahwa (Projet) confirmed	161
Côte-des-Neiges– Notre-Dame-de-Grâce	City councillor Loyola	Despina Sourias (Projet)	97	Despina Sourias (Projet) confirmed	101
Mercier–Hochelaga-Maisonneuve	City councillor Tétreaultville	Julien Hénault-Ratelle (Ensemble)	42	Julien Hénault-Ratelle (Ensemble) confirmed	55
Outremont	Borough mayor	Laurent Desbois (Ensemble)	23	Laurent Desbois (Ensemble) confirmed	31
Rivière-des-Prairies– Pointe-aux-Trembles	Borough mayor	Caroline Bourgeois (Projet)	303	Caroline Bourgeois (Projet) confirmed	135
Rivière-des-Prairies– Pointe-aux-Trembles	City councillor La Pointe-aux-Prairies	Lisa Christensen (Projet)	13	Lisa Christensen (Projet) confirmed	13

=== Seat totals ===
The parties won the following seats:

Position	Projet Montréal	Ensemble Montréal	Équipe LaSalle Team	Équipe Anjou
Mayor of Montreal	1	0	0	0
Borough mayor	10	6	1	1
City councillor	26	17	2	1
City council total	37	23	3	2
Borough councillor	16	15	4	3
Total seats	53	38	7	5

=== Composition of city and borough councils ===
Depending on their borough, Montrealers voted for:

- Mayor of Montreal
- Borough mayor, who is also a city councillor and borough councillor
  - Ville-Marie: No borough mayor election; the mayor of Montreal is ex officio borough mayor
- One city councillor per district, who is also a borough councillor. Exceptions:
  - Anjou and Lachine: one city councillor for the entire borough
  - Outremont and L'Île-Bizard–Sainte-Geneviève: no city councillors other than the borough mayor
- Zero, one, or two additional borough councillors per district

Borough	District				
Borough	District	City Councillors		Borough Councillor	Borough Councillor
Borough	District	Borough Mayor	City Councillor	Borough Councillor	Borough Councillor
Ahuntsic-Cartierville	Ahuntsic	Émilie Thuillier	Nathalie Goulet		
Ahuntsic-Cartierville	Bordeaux-Cartierville	Émilie Thuillier	Effie Giannou		
Ahuntsic-Cartierville	Saint-Sulpice	Émilie Thuillier	Julie Roy		
Ahuntsic-Cartierville	Sault-au-Récollet	Émilie Thuillier	Jérôme Normand		
Anjou	Centre	Luis Miranda	Andrée Hénault	Kristine Marsolais	
Anjou	East	Luis Miranda	Andrée Hénault	Richard Leblanc	
Anjou	West	Luis Miranda	Andrée Hénault	Marie-Josée Dubé	
Côte-des-Neiges– Notre-Dame-de-Grâce	Côte-des-Neiges	Gracia Kasoki Katahwa	Magda Popeanu		
Côte-des-Neiges– Notre-Dame-de-Grâce	Darlington	Gracia Kasoki Katahwa	Stephanie Valenzuela		
Côte-des-Neiges– Notre-Dame-de-Grâce	Loyola	Gracia Kasoki Katahwa	Despina Sourias		
Côte-des-Neiges– Notre-Dame-de-Grâce	Notre-Dame-de-Grâce	Gracia Kasoki Katahwa	Peter McQueen		
Côte-des-Neiges– Notre-Dame-de-Grâce	Snowdon	Gracia Kasoki Katahwa	Sonny Moroz		
L'Île-Bizard– Sainte-Geneviève	Denis-Benjamin-Viger	Stéphane Côté		Alain Wilson	
L'Île-Bizard– Sainte-Geneviève	Jacques-Bizard	Stéphane Côté		Richard Bélanger	
L'Île-Bizard– Sainte-Geneviève	Pierre-Foretier	Stéphane Côté		Danielle Myrand	
L'Île-Bizard– Sainte-Geneviève	Sainte-Geneviève	Stéphane Côté		Suzanne Marceau	
Lachine	Du Canal	Maja Vodanovic	Vicki Grondin	Micheline Rouleau	
Lachine	Fort-Rolland	Maja Vodanovic	Vicki Grondin	Michèle Flannery	
Lachine	J.-Émery-Provost	Maja Vodanovic	Vicki Grondin	Younes Boukala	
LaSalle	Cecil-P.-Newman	Nancy Blanchet	Laura Palestini	Michel Noël	Josée Troilo
LaSalle	Sault-Saint-Louis	Nancy Blanchet	Richard Deschamps	Daniela Romano	Benoit Auger
Mercier– Hochelaga-Maisonneuve	Hochelaga	Pierre Lessard-Blais	Éric Alan Caldwell		
Mercier– Hochelaga-Maisonneuve	Louis-Riel	Pierre Lessard-Blais	Alba Zuniga Ramos		
Mercier– Hochelaga-Maisonneuve	Maisonneuve–Longue-Pointe	Pierre Lessard-Blais	Alia Hassan-Cournol		
Mercier– Hochelaga-Maisonneuve	Tétreaultville	Pierre Lessard-Blais	Julien Hénault-Ratelle		
Montréal-Nord	Marie-Clarac	Christine Black	Abdelhaq Sari	Jean Marc Poirier	
Montréal-Nord	Ovide-Clermont	Christine Black	Chantal Rossi	Philippe Thermidor	
Outremont	Claude-Ryan	Laurent Desbois		Mindy Pollak	
Outremont	Jeanne-Sauvé	Laurent Desbois		Caroline Braun	
Outremont	Joseph-Beaubien	Laurent Desbois		Valérie Patreau	
Outremont	Robert-Bourassa	Laurent Desbois		Marie Potvin	
Pierrefonds-Roxboro	Bois-de-Liesse	Dimitrios (Jim) Beis	Benoit Langevin	Louise Leroux	
Pierrefonds-Roxboro	Cap-Saint-Jacques	Dimitrios (Jim) Beis	Catherine Clément-Talbot	Chahi (Sharkie) Tarakjian	
Le Plateau-Mont-Royal	De Lorimier	Luc Rabouin	Marianne Giguère	Laurence Parent	
Le Plateau-Mont-Royal	Jeanne-Mance	Luc Rabouin	Alex Norris	Maeva Vilain	
Le Plateau-Mont-Royal	Mile-End	Luc Rabouin	Marie Plourde	Marie Sterlin	
Rivière-des-Prairies– Pointe-aux-Trembles	La Pointe-aux-Prairies	Caroline Bourgeois	Lisa Christensen	Daphney Colin	
Rivière-des-Prairies– Pointe-aux-Trembles	Pointe-aux-Trembles	Caroline Bourgeois	Virginie Journeau	Marie-Claude Baril	
Rivière-des-Prairies– Pointe-aux-Trembles	Rivière-des-Prairies	Caroline Bourgeois	Giovanni Rapanà	Nathalie Pierre-Antoine	
Rosemont– La Petite-Patrie	Étienne-Desmarteau	François Limoges	Ericka Alneus		
Rosemont– La Petite-Patrie	Marie-Victorin	François Limoges	Jocelyn Pauzé		
Rosemont– La Petite-Patrie	Saint-Édouard	François Limoges	Josefina Blanco		
Rosemont– La Petite-Patrie	Vieux-Rosemont	François Limoges	Dominique Ollivier		
Saint-Laurent	Côte-de-Liesse	Alan DeSousa	Vana Nazarian	Jacques Cohen	
Saint-Laurent	Norman-McLaren	Alan DeSousa	Aref Salem	Annie Gagnier	
Saint-Léonard	Saint-Léonard-Est	Michel Bissonnet	Angela Gentile	Arij El Korbi	
Saint-Léonard	Saint-Léonard-Ouest	Michel Bissonnet	Dominic Perri	Suzanne De Larochellière	
Le Sud-Ouest	Saint-Henri-Est–Petite-Bourgogne– Pointe-Saint-Charles–Griffintown	Benoit Dorais	Craig Sauvé	Tan Shan Li	
Le Sud-Ouest	Saint-Paul–Émard– Saint-Henri-Ouest	Benoit Dorais	Alain Vaillancourt	Anne-Marie Sigouin	
Verdun	Champlain–L'Île-des-Sœurs	Marie-Andrée Mauger	Véronique Tremblay	Céline-Audrey Beauregard	Enrique Machado
Verdun	Desmarchais-Crawford	Marie-Andrée Mauger	Sterling Downey	Benoit Gratton	Kaïla A. Munro
Ville-Marie	Peter-McGill	(Mayor of Montreal)	Serge Sasseville		
Ville-Marie	Saint-Jacques	(Mayor of Montreal)	Robert Beaudry		
Ville-Marie	Sainte-Marie	(Mayor of Montreal)	Sophie Mauzerolle		
Villeray–Saint-Michel– Parc-Extension	François-Perrault	Laurence Lavigne Lalonde	Sylvain Ouellet		
Villeray–Saint-Michel– Parc-Extension	Parc-Extension	Laurence Lavigne Lalonde	Mary Deros		
Villeray–Saint-Michel– Parc-Extension	Saint-Michel	Laurence Lavigne Lalonde	Josué Corvil		
Villeray–Saint-Michel– Parc-Extension	Villeray	Laurence Lavigne Lalonde	Martine Musau Muele		

== Seat-by-seat results ==
=== Mayoral election ===
2021 Montreal municipal election: Mayor
Party	Candidate	Votes	%	±%
Projet Montréal	Valérie Plante	217,986	52.14	+0.72
Ensemble Montréal	Denis Coderre	158,751	37.97	-7.69
Mouvement Montréal	Balarama Holness	30,235	7.23	
Action Montréal	Gilbert Thibodeau	4,327	1.03	+0.68
Independent	Beverly Bernardo	1,760	0.42	
Montréal 2021	Luc Ménard	1,666	0.40	
Independent	Jean Duval	1,129	0.27	
Independent	Fang Hu	1,035	0.25	
Independent	Dimitri Mourkes	841	0.20	
Independent	Widler Jules	349	0.08	
Total valid votes		418,079	98.19	
Total rejected ballots		7,687	1.81	-0.59
Turnout		425,766	38.32	-4.15
Eligible voters		1,111,100		
Projet Montréal hold		Swing		+4.21
Source: Elections Montreal

=== Ahuntsic-Cartierville ===
Electoral District	Eligible voters	Position	Turnout	Candidates					Incumbent
Electoral District	Eligible voters	Position	Turnout	Projet Montréal	Ensemble Montréal	Mouvement Montréal	Action Montréal	Independent	Incumbent
—	85,647	Borough mayor	42.27%	Émilie Thuillier; 19,873 (56.31%)	Chantal Huot; 13,505 (38.27%)	Kassandre Chéry Théodat; 1,912 (5.42%)			Émilie Thuillier
Ahuntsic	21,532	City councillor	48.45%	Nathalie Goulet; 6,781 (66.43%)	Yves Normandin; 3,110 (30.47%)		Éric Lessard; 316 (3.14%)		Nathalie Goulet
Bordeaux-Cartierville	20,899	City councillor	32.92%	Anne-Marie Kabongo; 2,468 (36.72%)	Effie Giannou; 3,436 (51.12%)	Jean David Prophète; 373 (5.55%)		Rana Atie; 445 (6.62%)	Effie Giannou
Saint-Sulpice	23,353	City councillor	40.47%	Julie Roy; 4,609 (49.96%)	Hadrien Parizeau; 4,094 (44.37%)	Briana McCarthy; 523 (5.67%)			Hadrien Parizeau
Sault-au-Récollet	19,863	City councillor	47.92%	Jérôme Normand; 5,447 (58.61%)	Gaetana Colella; 3,388 (36.46%)	Dimitrios Tomaras; 457 (4.92%)			Jérôme Normand

=== Anjou ===
Electoral District	Eligible voters	Position	Turnout	Candidates			Incumbent
Electoral District	Eligible voters	Position	Turnout	Projet Montréal	Équipe Anjou	Mouvement Montréal	Incumbent
—	28,673	Borough mayor	40.29%	Kettly Beauregard; 2,732 (24.49%)	Luis Miranda; 7,857 (70.42%)	Wassim Meradi; 568 (5.09%)	Luis Miranda
—	28,673	City councillor	40.25%	François Plourde; 3,084 (27.72%)	Andrée Hénault; 7,544 (67.81%)	Marc II Réjouis; 497 (4.47%)	Andrée Hénault
Centre	10,653	Borough councillor	40.98%	Kadri Shérifi; 1,115 (27.04%)	Kristine Marsolais; 3,009 (72.96%)		Kristine Marsolais
East	8,513	Borough councillor	38.67%	Claudia Servant; 994 (31.47%)	Richard Leblanc; 2,165 (68.53%)		Richard Leblanc
West	9,507	Borough councillor	40.69%	Houda Ouraghi; 962 (26.13%)	Marie-Josée Dubé; 2,719 (73.87%)		Lynne Shand

=== Côte-des-Neiges–Notre-Dame-de-Grâce ===
Electoral District	Eligible voters	Position	Turnout	Candidates						Incumbent
Electoral District	Eligible voters	Position	Turnout	Projet Montréal	Ensemble Montréal	Courage	Mouvement Montréal	Team CDN - NDG	Other	Incumbent
—	94,935	Borough mayor	34.24%	Gracia Kasoki Katahwa; 11,964 (37.56%)	Lionel Perez; 11,803 (37.06%)	Sue Montgomery; 3,115 (9.78%)	Matthew Kerr; 3,569 (11.21%)	Alexander Montagano; 1,135 (3.56%)	Neal Mukherjee (Action Montréal); 263 (0.83%)	Sue Montgomery
Côte-des-Neiges	16,556	City councillor	34.71%	Magda Popeanu; 3,112 (55.29%)	Dimitra Kostarides; 1,466 (26.04%)	Patrice Cesar; 505 (8.97%)	Rita Ikhouane; 435 (7.73%)	Snowdon Romeo; 111 (1.97%)		Magda Popeanu
Darlington	16,846	City councillor	28.25%	Jérémie Alarco; 1,231 (26.55%)	Stephanie Valenzuela; 2,715 (58.56%)	Sabine Monpierre; 179 (3.86%)	Rosemarie McPherson; 351 (7.57%)	Kamala Thevi Jegatheeswaran; 160 (3.45%)		Lionel Perez
Loyola	20,952	City councillor	35.49%	Despina Sourias; 2,205 (30.23%)	Gabriel Retta; 2,104 (28.85%)	Annalisa Harris; 700 (9.60%)	Joel DeBellefeuille; 1,123 (15.40%)	Gianpaolo Trani; 370 (5.08%)	Joe Ortona (Ind.); 708 (9.71%); Dora Caroline Orchard (Action Montréal); 84 (1.15%)	Vacant
Notre-Dame-de-Grâce	21,074	City councillor	41.46%	Peter McQueen; 5,022 (58.16%)	Ashley Thornton; 1,601 (18.54%)	Louise Kold-Taylor; 831 (9.62%)	Luciana Arantes; 950 (11.00%)	David Handelman; 231 (2.68%)		Peter McQueen
Snowdon	19,507	City councillor	29.95%	Victor Armony; 1,814 (31.68%)	Sonny Moroz; 2,682 (46.84%)	France Stohner; 390 (6.81%)	Mauro Peña; 680 (11.88%)	Madeleine Soos; 160 (2.79%)		Marvin Rotrand

=== L'Île-Bizard–Sainte-Geneviève ===
Electoral District	Eligible voters	Position	Turnout	Candidates			Incumbent
Electoral District	Eligible voters	Position	Turnout	Projet Montréal	Ensemble Montréal	Mouvement Montréal	Incumbent
—	13,679	Borough mayor	49.00%	Normand Marinacci; 2,226 (33.93%)	Stéphane Côté; 3,150 (48.01%)	Susan Kennerknecht Bastien; 1,185 (18.06%)	Normand Marinacci
Denis-Benjamin-Viger	3,724	Borough councillor	53.87%	Stephanie Soussamian; 775 (39.38%)	Alain Wilson; 877 (44.56%)	Manal Soujaa; 316 (16.06%)	Christian Larocque
Jacques-Bizard	3,288	Borough councillor	48.66%	Geneviève Delisle; 499 (31.72%)	Richard Bélanger; 735 (46.73%)	Robert Samoszewski; 339 (21.55%)	Robert Samoszewski
Pierre-Foretier	4,191	Borough councillor	51.63%	Maxime Deshaies; 830 (39.26%)	Danielle Myrand; 1,018 (48.16%)	Claudio Onorati; 266 (12.58%)	Yves Sarault
Sainte-Geneviève	2,476	Borough councillor	36.59%	Fadima Touré-Diallo; 335 (38.46%)	Suzanne Marceau; 376 (43.17%)	Caroline Arslanian; 160 (18.37%)	Suzanne Marceau

=== Lachine ===
Electoral District	Eligible voters	Position	Turnout	Candidates					Incumbent
Electoral District	Eligible voters	Position	Turnout	Projet Montréal	Ensemble Montréal	Mouvement Montréal	Action Montréal	Independent	Incumbent
—	31,168	Borough mayor	39.24%	Maja Vodanovic; 7,377 (62.21%)	Josée Côté; 4,482 (37.79%)				Maja Vodanovic
—	31,168	City councillor	39.44%	Vicki Grondin; 6,395 (53.33%)	Denis Boucher; 4,537 (37.83%)	Nadine Chalati; 1,060 (8.84%)			Micheline Rouleau
Du Canal	11,351	Borough councillor	34.89%	Micheline Rouleau; 1,972 (51.05%)	Lise Poulin; 1,462 (37.85%)	Curren Dewan; 270 (6.99%)	Jean-Ricardo André; 89 (2.30%)	André Lavigne; 70 (1.81%)	Julie-Pascale Provost
Fort-Rolland	10,074	Borough councillor	51.56%	Michèle Flannery; 3,268 (64.75%)	Simon Masella; 1,779 (35.25%)				Michèle Flannery
J.-Émery-Provost	9,743	Borough councillor	31.74%	Younes Boukala; 1,709 (57.50%)	Kymberley Simonyik; 1,263 (42.50%)				Younes Boukala

=== LaSalle ===
Electoral District	Eligible voters	Position	Turnout	Candidates					Incumbent
Electoral District	Eligible voters	Position	Turnout	Projet Montréal	Ensemble Montréal	LaSalle Team	Mouvement Montréal	Action Montréal	Incumbent
—	51,813	Borough mayor	30.87%	Jean-François Lefebvre; 3,127 (20.08%)	Steven Laperrière; 3,163 (20.31%)	Nancy Blanchet; 7,508 (48.21%)	Theodros Wolde; 1,274 (8.18%)	Francisco Moreno; 502 (3.22%)	Manon Barbe
Cecil-P.-Newman	25,331	City councillor	27.41%	Anila Erindi; 1,419 (21.19%)	Monique Vallée; 1,694 (25.29%)	Laura Palestini; 2,672 (39.89%)	Elijah Olise; 725 (10.82%)	Eric Tremblay; 188 (2.81%)	Lise Zarac
Cecil-P.-Newman	25,331	Borough councillor I	27.39%	Anh Dao; 1,460 (21.98%)	Catherine Bourgoin; 1,807 (27.20%)	Michel Noël; 2,501 (37.65%)	Joe Blanco; 875 (13.17%)		Serge Declos
Cecil-P.-Newman	25,331	Borough councillor II	27.35%	Pierre Marc Ngamaleu; 1,472 (22.31%)	Michael Peter Morin; 1,834 (27.80%)	Josée Troilo; 3,291 (49.89%)			Josée Troilo
Sault-Saint-Louis	26,482	City councillor	33.68%	Jean-François Bernier; 2,260 (26.02%)	Naveed Hussain; 1,684 (19.39%)	Richard Deschamps; 4,460 (51.36%)		Lise Vallée; 280 (3.22%)	Richard Deschamps
Sault-Saint-Louis	26,482	Borough councillor I	34.20%	Salah-Eddine Dahel; 2,238 (25.42%)	Anthony Perrotti; 1,926 (21.88%)	Daniela Romano; 4,459 (50.65%)		Ihor Kravchuk; 180 (2.04%)	Laura Palestini
Sault-Saint-Louis	26,482	Borough councillor II	34.21%	Ben Chung; 2,163 (24.60%)	Juan Mendez; 1,858 (21.14%)	Benoit Auger; 4,770 (54.26%)			Nancy Blanchet

=== Mercier–Hochelaga-Maisonneuve ===
Electoral District	Eligible voters	Position	Turnout	Candidates					Incumbent
Electoral District	Eligible voters	Position	Turnout	Projet Montréal	Ensemble Montréal	Mouvement Montréal	Action Montréal	Independent	Incumbent
—	96,141	Borough mayor	41.55%	Pierre Lessard-Blais; 20,022 (51.24%)	Karine Boivin Roy; 15,774 (40.37%)	Patricia Tulasne; 2,404 (6.15%)	Robert Sévigny; 874 (2.24%)		Pierre Lessard-Blais
Hochelaga	23,374	City councillor	39.75%	Éric Alan Caldwell; 5,973 (65.70%)	Réal Ménard; 2,467 (27.14%)	~~Jean-Philippe Martin~~; Candidacy withdrawn		Ariane Beaudin; 651 (7.16%)	Éric Alan Caldwell
Louis-Riel	21,482	City councillor	44.54%	Julie Lamontagne; 4,095 (44.00%)	Alba Zuniga Ramos; 4,698 (50.48%)	Philippe Corbeil; 513 (5.51%)			Karine Boivin Roy
Maisonneuve–Longue-Pointe	24,649	City councillor	39.54%	Alia Hassan-Cournol; 5,490 (57.95%)	Emilia Tamko; 3,356 (35.42%)	~~Sylvain Medzalabenleth~~; Candidacy withdrawn	Murielle Albert; 628 (6.63%)		Laurence Lavigne Lalonde
Tétreaultville	26,636	City councillor	42.63%	Suzie Miron; 5,098 (46.06%)	Julien Hénault-Ratelle; 5,153 (46.56%)	Priscille Dossouvi; 421 (3.80%)	Jean-Pierre Dakouo; 396 (3.58%)		Suzie Miron

=== Montréal-Nord ===
Electoral District	Eligible voters	Position	Turnout	Candidates				Incumbent
Electoral District	Eligible voters	Position	Turnout	Projet Montréal	Ensemble Montréal	Mouvement Montréal	Action Montréal	Incumbent
—	51,140	Borough mayor	33.53%	Will Prosper; 4,851 (29.29%)	Christine Black; 10,638 (64.24%)	Carl-Henry Jean-François; 735 (4.44%)	Vito Salvaggio; 337 (2.03%)	Christine Black
Marie-Clarac	27,280	City councillor	34.11%	Mathieu Léonard; 3,452 (38.95%)	Abdelhaq Sari; 5,411 (61.05%)			Abdelhaq Sari
Marie-Clarac	27,280	Borough councillor	34.11%	Ana E Mejia; 2,892 (32.50%)	Jean Marc Poirier; 5,478 (61.56%)	Fabrice Horace; 528 (5.93%)		Jean Marc Poirier
Ovide-Clermont	23,860	City councillor	32.93%	Fatima Gabriela Salazar Gomez; 2,423 (32.38%)	Chantal Rossi; Co-candidate for Denis Coderre; 5,060 (67.62%)			Chantal Rossi
Ovide-Clermont	23,860	Borough councillor	32.94%	D-yana Bommier; 2,384 (32.36%)	Philippe Thermidor; 4,461 (60.56%)	Daphney Celestin; 521 (7.07%)		Renée-Chantal Belinga

=== Outremont ===
Electoral District	Eligible voters	Position	Turnout	Candidates				Incumbent
Electoral District	Eligible voters	Position	Turnout	Projet Montréal	Ensemble Montréal	Parti Outremont	Mouvement Montréal	Incumbent
—	15,328	Borough mayor	55.98%	Philipe Tomlinson; 4,120 (49.81%)	Laurent Desbois; 4,151 (50.19%)		~~Marc-Antoine Desjardins~~; Candidacy withdrawn	Philipe Tomlinson
Claude-Ryan	4,106	Borough councillor	53.46%	Mindy Pollak; 1,461 (81.53%)	~~Dan Kraft~~; Candidacy withdrawn		Joshua Rosenbaum; 331 (18.47%)	Mindy Pollak
Jeanne-Sauvé	3,729	Borough councillor	55.22%	Fanny Magini; 709 (34.77%)	Caroline Braun; 844 (41.39%)	Simon Latraverse; 486 (23.84%)		Fanny Magini
Joseph-Beaubien	4,084	Borough councillor	60.55%	Valérie Patreau; 1,053 (43.00%)	Philippe Guertin; 579 (23.64%)	Céline Forget; 817 (33.36%)		Valérie Patreau
Robert-Bourassa	3,409	Borough councillor	53.83%	Jill Lance; 701 (38.47%)	Marie Potvin; 771 (42.32%)	Jean-Marc Corbeil; 350 (19.21%)	~~Katchik Ebruchumian~~; Candidacy withdrawn	Jean-Marc Corbeil

=== Pierrefonds-Roxboro ===
Electoral District	Eligible voters	Position	Turnout	Candidates			Incumbent
Electoral District	Eligible voters	Position	Turnout	Projet Montréal	Ensemble Montréal	Mouvement Montréal	Incumbent
—	47,706	Borough mayor	30.50%	Patricio Cruz-Gutierrez; 3,631 (25.43%)	Dimitrios (Jim) Beis; 8,650 (60.57%)	Nadeem Sohail; 1,999 (14.00%)	Dimitrios Jim Beis
Bois-de-Liesse	24,854	City councillor	31.02%	Mokhtar Liamini; 2,241 (29.96%)	Benoit Langevin; 3,901 (52.15%)	Nic Paterson; 1,338 (17.89%)	Benoit Langevin
Bois-de-Liesse	24,854	Borough councillor	31.08%	Matthieu Bélanger; 2,331 (31.04%)	Louise Leroux; 3,781 (50.35%)	Ahmed Malik; 1,397 (18.60%)	Louise Leroux
Cap-Saint-Jacques	22,852	City councillor	29.97%	Irina Cazac; 2,089 (31.07%)	Catherine Clément-Talbot; 3,316 (49.32%)	Marilyn Lanni; 1,319 (19.62%)	Catherine Clément-Talbot
Cap-Saint-Jacques	22,852	Borough councillor	29.97%	Mirian Perez; 2,352 (35.05%)	Chahi (Sharkie) Tarakjian; 3,067 (45.71%)	Nayab Tariq; 1,291 (19.24%)	Yves Gignac

=== Le Plateau-Mont-Royal ===
Electoral District	Eligible voters	Position	Turnout	Candidates					Incumbent
Electoral District	Eligible voters	Position	Turnout	Projet Montréal	Ensemble Montréal	Mouvement Montréal	Action Montréal	Independent	Incumbent
—	62,495	Borough mayor	44.70%	Luc Rabouin; 20,440 (74.63%)	Shant Karabajak; 4,924 (17.98%)	Daniel Vazquez; 2,025 (7.39%)			Luc Rabouin
De Lorimier	21,808	City councillor	48.83%	Marianne Giguère; 6,890 (65.72%)	Olivia Kowalski; 1,616 (15.41%)			Juliette Côté-Turcotte; 1,978 (18.87%)	Marianne Giguère
De Lorimier	21,808	Borough councillor	48.52%	Laurence Parent; 8,400 (81.27%)	Hugo Vallée; 1,936 (18.73%)				Josefina Blanco
Jeanne-Mance	20,130	City councillor	39.48%	Alex Norris; 5,390 (69.17%)	Martin Oré; 1,698 (21.79%)	John Tessier; 599 (7.69%)	Bougadari Sanogo; 105 (1.35%)		Alex Norris
Jeanne-Mance	20,130	Borough councillor	39.85%	Maeva Vilain; 5,394 (68.53%)	Jean-Pierre Szaraz; 1,758 (22.34%)	Rebecca Lessard; 719 (9.13%)			Maeva Vilain
Mile-End	20,557	City councillor	45.81%	Marie Plourde; 6,926 (75.16%)	Mélissa Bernier-Emond; 1,534 (16.65%)	Alexandre Zaezjev; 755 (8.19%)			Richard Ryan
Mile-End	20,557	Borough councillor	45.56%	Marie Sterlin; 6,818 (74.30%)	Benoit Rouleau; 1,517 (16.53%)	Maggie Bolduc; 841 (9.17%)			Marie Plourde

=== Rivière-des-Prairies–Pointe-aux-Trembles ===
Electoral District	Eligible voters	Position	Turnout	Candidates				Incumbent
Electoral District	Eligible voters	Position	Turnout	Projet Montréal	Ensemble Montréal	Mouvement Montréal	Action Montréal	Incumbent
—	79,658	Borough mayor	38.86%	Caroline Bourgeois; 14,259 (47.59%)	Lyne Laperrière; 14,124 (47.14%)	Charles Sounan; 1,578 (5.27%)		Caroline Bourgeois
La Pointe-aux-Prairies	26,644	City councillor	38.35%	Lisa Christensen; 4,695 (47.37%)	Vincent Girard; 4,682 (47.24%)	Paulo Saade; 535 (5.40%)		Richard Guay
La Pointe-aux-Prairies	26,644	Borough councillor	38.05%	Daphney Colin; 4,749 (48.18%)	Patrick Laliberté; 4,612 (46.79%)		Louis Chandonnet; 495 (5.02%)	Lisa Christensen
Pointe-aux-Trembles	25,987	City councillor	40.51%	Virginie Journeau; 5,748 (56.56%)	Glenda Morris; 4,414 (43.44%)			Suzanne Décarie
Pointe-aux-Trembles	25,987	Borough councillor	40.50%	Marie-Claude Baril; 5,731 (56.48%)	Daniel McSween; 4,416 (43.52%)			Gilles Déziel
Rivière-des-Prairies	27,027	City councillor	37.68%	Henri-Robert Durandisse; 2,833 (28.95%)	Giovanni Rapanà; 6,253 (63.89%)		Marie-Carmel Michel; 701 (7.16%)	Giovanni Rapanà
Rivière-des-Prairies	27,027	Borough councillor	37.68%	Joseph Paglia; 3,264 (33.73%)	Nathalie Pierre-Antoine; 6,414 (66.27%)			Nathalie Pierre-Antoine

=== Rosemont–La Petite-Patrie ===
Electoral District	Eligible voters	Position	Turnout	Candidates				Incumbent
Electoral District	Eligible voters	Position	Turnout	Projet Montréal	Ensemble Montréal	Mouvement Montréal	Action Montréal	Incumbent
—	96,544	Borough mayor	47.94%	François Limoges; 31,620 (70.07%)	Gilles Grondin; 13,507 (29.93%)			François William Croteau
Étienne-Desmarteau	22,309	City councillor	51.66%	Ericka Alneus; 8,175 (72.23%)	Émilia Diamadopoulou; 2,605 (23.02%)	Manel Dhaher; 275 (2.43%)	Karine Cusson; Co-candidate for Gilbert Thibodeau; 263 (2.32%)	Stéphanie Watt
Marie-Victorin	22,370	City councillor	44.03%	Jocelyn Pauzé; 5,318 (55.70%)	Vianney Godbout; 4,230 (44.30%)	~~Marc-André Bahl~~; Candidacy withdrawn		Jocelyn Pauzé
Saint-Édouard	24,466	City councillor	48.66%	Josefina Blanco; 8,778 (75.17%)	Sallim Dahman; 2,155 (18.45%)	Robert Constantin; 745 (6.38%)		François Limoges
Vieux-Rosemont	27,399	City councillor	47.34%	Dominique Ollivier; 8,927 (70.70%)	Roxane Mercier; 3,700 (29.30%)			Christine Gosselin

=== Saint-Laurent ===
Electoral District	Eligible voters	Position	Turnout	Candidates				Incumbent
Electoral District	Eligible voters	Position	Turnout	Projet Montréal	Ensemble Montréal	Mouvement Montréal	Independent	Incumbent
—	60,381	Borough mayor	28.97%	Blaise Guillotte; 3,652 (21.41%)	Alan DeSousa; 11,929 (69.93%)	Nassif Zakaria; 1,250 (7.33%)	Philippe Tessier; 228 (1.34%)	Alan DeSousa
Côte-de-Liesse	33,431	City councillor	29.65%	Tania Goitiandia Moore; 2,911 (30.31%)	Vana Nazarian; 5,679 (59.13%)	Shana Meo; 1,014 (10.56%)		Francesco Miele
Côte-de-Liesse	33,431	Borough councillor	29.69%	Valérie Maisonneuve; 2,991 (31.35%)	Jacques Cohen; 6,551 (68.65%)			Jacques Cohen
Norman-McLaren	26,950	City councillor	27.80%	Mohammad-Afaaq Mansoor; 2,517 (35.34%)	Aref Salem; 4,606 (64.66%)			Aref Salem
Norman-McLaren	26,950	Borough councillor	27.86%	Dominik Tremblay-Perron; 2,721 (38.26%)	Annie Gagnier; 4,390 (61.74%)			Michèle D. Biron

=== Saint-Léonard ===
Electoral District	Eligible voters	Position	Turnout	Candidates				Incumbent
Electoral District	Eligible voters	Position	Turnout	Projet Montréal	Ensemble Montréal	Mouvement Montréal	Independent	Incumbent
—	49,574	Borough mayor	32.68%	Nerlande Gaetan; 2,759 (17.71%)	Michel Bissonnet; 10,016 (64.30%)	Lili-Anne Tremblay; 2,802 (17.99%)		Michel Bissonnet
Saint-Léonard-Est	21,180	City councillor	34.10%	Nathan Dratler; 1,173 (16.88%)	Angela Gentile; 4,372 (62.90%)	Paulina Ayala; 832 (11.97%)	Dallal Boukhari; 574 (8.26%)	Vacant
Saint-Léonard-Est	21,180	Borough councillor	34.09%	Leila Benkhaled; 1,617 (23.80%)	Arij El Korbi; 3,312 (48.76%)	Giovanni Valvano; 1,864 (27.44%)		Lili-Anne Tremblay
Saint-Léonard-Ouest	28,394	City councillor	31.64%	Andres Larrea; 1,703 (19.78%)	Dominic Perri; 4,954 (57.55%)	Franco Conciatori; 1,951 (22.66%)		Dominic Perri
Saint-Léonard-Ouest	28,394	Borough councillor	31.64%	Dante Ventulieri; 1,713 (19.92%)	Suzanne De Larochellière; 3,933 (45.74%)	Djamel Lahlou; 1,157 (13.46%)	Mario Battista; 1,795 (20.88%)	Mario Battista

=== Le Sud-Ouest ===
Electoral District	Eligible voters	Position	Turnout	Candidates					Incumbent
Electoral District	Eligible voters	Position	Turnout	Projet Montréal	Ensemble Montréal	Mouvement Montréal	Action Montréal	Independent	Incumbent
—	55,705	Borough mayor	35.08%	Benoit Dorais; 10,953 (57.45%)	Francine Verrier; 5,696 (29.88%)	Keeton Clarke; 2,416 (12.67%)			Benoit Dorais
Saint-Henri-Est–Petite-Bourgogne–Pointe-Saint-Charles–Griffintown	31,896	City councillor	34.74%	Craig Sauvé; 5,694 (52.82%)	Heidi Hollinger; 3,401 (31.55%)	Stephanie Henry-King; 1,685 (15.63%)			Craig Sauvé
Saint-Henri-Est–Petite-Bourgogne–Pointe-Saint-Charles–Griffintown	31,896	Borough councillor	34.57%	Tan Shan Li; 5,520 (50.88%)	Romean Alam; 3,040 (28.02%)	Nafija Rahman; 1,268 (11.69%)		Patrick de Gruyter; 1,020 (9.40%)	Sophie Thiébaut
Saint-Paul–Émard–Saint-Henri-Ouest	23,809	City councillor	35.41%	Alain Vaillancourt; 4,742 (57.61%)	Michel Martel; 2,451 (29.78%)	Sam Donald; 796 (9.67%)	Mario Giguère; 242 (2.94%)		Anne-Marie Sigouin
Saint-Paul–Émard–Saint-Henri-Ouest	23,809	Borough councillor	35.37%	Anne-Marie Sigouin; 4,803 (58.68%)	Guillaume Rudloff; 2,504 (30.59%)	Tara-Starr McConnell; 878 (10.73%)			Alain Vaillancourt

=== Verdun ===
Electoral District	Eligible voters	Position	Turnout	Candidates				Incumbent
Electoral District	Eligible voters	Position	Turnout	Projet Montréal	Ensemble Montréal	Mouvement Montréal	Independent	Incumbent
—	48,147	Borough mayor	42.75%	Marie-Andrée Mauger; 13,069 (64.81%)	Antoine Richard; 5,646 (28.00%)	Jayoti Nanda; 1,451 (7.20%)		Jean-François Parenteau
Champlain– L'Île-des-Sœurs	27,001	City councillor	43.09%	Véronique Tremblay; 6,476 (56.71%)	Nadine Gelly; 3,640 (31.87%)	Eric McCarty; 697 (6.10%)	Alain Bossé; 607 (5.32%)	Marie-Josée Parent
Champlain– L'Île-des-Sœurs	27,001	Borough councillor I	43.01%	Céline-Audrey Beauregard; 6,884 (61.19%)	Jean Airoldi; 4,367 (38.81%)			Pierre L'Heureux
Champlain– L'Île-des-Sœurs	27,001	Borough councillor II	42.57%	Enrique Machado; 6,681 (60.69%)	Josée Léger; 4,328 (39.31%)	~~Jean-Pierre Boivin~~; Candidacy withdrawn		Véronique Tremblay
Desmarchais-Crawford	21,146	City councillor	42.42%	Sterling Downey; 6,024 (68.43%)	Éric (Balou) Chartrand; 2,160 (24.54%)	Nathe Perrone; 619 (7.03%)		Sterling Downey
Desmarchais-Crawford	21,146	Borough councillor I	42.36%	Benoit Gratton; 5,457 (62.27%)	Natacha Louis; 2,257 (25.75%)		Rosalie Bélanger-Rioux; 1,050 (11.98%)	Luc Gagnon
Desmarchais-Crawford	21,146	Borough councillor II	42.42%	Kaïla A. Munro; 5,634 (64.08%)	Lili-Anne Bergeron; 2,434 (27.68%)	Jonathan Reinglas; 724 (8.23%)		Marie-Andrée Mauger

=== Ville-Marie ===
Electoral District	Eligible voters	Position	Turnout	Candidates				Incumbent
Electoral District	Eligible voters	Position	Turnout	Projet Montréal	Ensemble Montréal	Mouvement Montréal	Action Montréal	Incumbent
Peter-McGill	19,004	City councillor	26.75%	Daniel Tran; 1,816 (36.39%)	Serge Sasseville; 1,982 (39.71%)	Idil Issa; Co-candidate for Balarama Holness; 1,151 (23.06%)	Zbigniew Mandryk; 42 (0.84%)	Cathy Wong
Saint-Jacques	21,511	City councillor	35.78%	Robert Beaudry; 4,500 (59.45%)	Malika Dehraoui; 2,419 (31.96%)	Shane Thompson; 651 (8.60%)		Robert Beaudry
Sainte-Marie	17,303	City councillor	39.61%	Sophie Mauzerolle; Co-candidate for Valérie Plante; 4,482 (66.62%)	Daniel Vaudrin; 1,793 (26.65%)	Samuel Miriello; 337 (5.01%)	Jean-Christophe Trottier; 116 (1.72%)	Sophie Mauzerolle

=== Villeray–Saint-Michel–Parc-Extension ===
Electoral District	Eligible voters	Position	Turnout	Candidates					Incumbent
Electoral District	Eligible voters	Position	Turnout	Projet Montréal	Ensemble Montréal	Quartiers Montréal	Mouvement Montréal	Other	Incumbent
—	84,548	Borough mayor	36.97%	Laurence Lavigne Lalonde; 16,210 (53.29%)	Guillaume Lavoie; 9,796 (32.20%)	Giuliana Fumagalli; 2,336 (7.68%)	Julien Kakpovi; 1,657 (5.45%)	Clément Sauriol (Action Montréal); 422 (1.39%)	Giuliana Fumagalli
François-Perrault	21,441	City councillor	36.07%	Sylvain Ouellet; 4,334 (57.47%)	Mike Parente; 2,428 (32.24%)	Chahrazed Zadi; 338 (4.49%)	Nawal Bekhechi; 432 (5.74%)		Sylvain Ouellet
Parc-Extension	19,125	City councillor	35.61%	Geneviève Morency; 2,502 (37.49%)	Mary Deros; 2,885 (43.23%)	Leonora King; 601 (9.01%)	Mohammad Yousuf; 571 (8.56%)	Luc Lupien (Ind.); 115 (1.72%)	Mary Deros
Saint-Michel	20,803	City councillor	24.28%	Yong-Fat Chau; 1,378 (28.33%)	Josué Corvil; 2,614 (53.74%)	Wendy Olivier; 302 (6.21%)	Cynthia Nkamicaniye; 282 (5.80%)	Daniel Bouffard (Action Montréal); 288 (5.92%)	Josué Corvil
Villeray	23,179	City councillor	50.33%	Martine Musau Muele; 7,876 (68.70%)	Mourad Romdhane; 2,500 (21.81%)	Mariem Mathlouthi; 677 (5.90%)	Anastasia Pomares; 412 (3.59%)		Rosannie Filato

== By-elections ==
=== Mayor of Île-Bizard-Sainte-Geneviève ===
A by-election was held on December 17, 2023:

Party	Candidate	Vote	%
Ensemble Montréal	Doug Hurley	3,208	78.42
Projet Montréal	Ghassan Baroudi	883	21.58
Total valid votes		4,091	29.70
