= Balarama Holness =

Canadian football player and politician (born 1983)

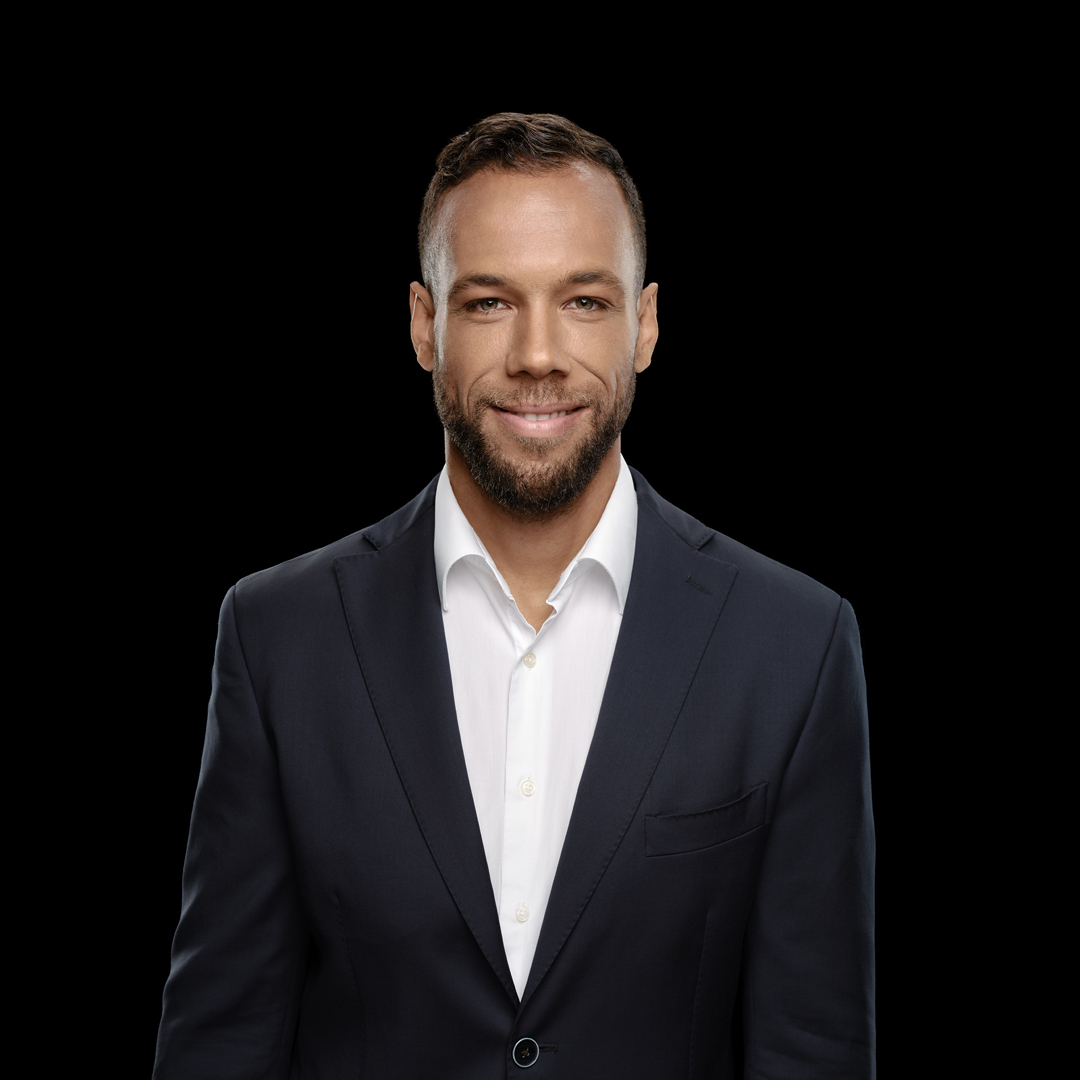

No. 36
- Position: Cornerback

Personal information
- Born: July 20, 1983 (age 43); Montreal, Quebec, Canada
- Listed height: 5 ft 11 in (1.80 m)
- Listed weight: 194 lb (88 kg)

Career information
- University: Ottawa
- NFL draft: 2008: undrafted

Career history
- Winnipeg Blue Bombers (2008–2009); Montreal Alouettes (2010–2011)

Awards and highlights
- Grey Cup champion (2010)
- Stats at CFL.ca (archive)

Balarama Holness (born July 20, 1983), also known as Steven Holness, is a Canadian politician and former professional football safety. He was originally signed by the Winnipeg Blue Bombers as an undrafted free agent in 2008. He won a Grey Cup Championship with the Montreal Alouettes in 2010. He played CIS Football at Ottawa.

== Family and early life ==
Holness was born in Montreal to a Québécois mother and a Jamaican father. Andrew Michael Holness, the current Prime Minister of Jamaica is his first cousin. His mother's Hinduism resulted in the name Balarama and a childhood at an ashram in West Virginia. Aged nine he moved to Boisbriand, where he was required to use the name "Steven", which he maintained in his pro football career. His daughter is named after Marie-Joseph Angélique, a Portuguese-born black slave in New France.

== Political career ==
While studying law at McGill University, he ran for borough mayor of Montréal-Nord for Projet Montréal in the 2017 Montreal municipal election but lost to Christine Black. After the 2017 election, Holness launched a petition calling for the city to hold a public consultation on systemic racism and discrimination. Founder of a social justice lobby group "Montreal in Action," Holness was profiled on November 21, 2020, by the CTV Television Network as "an inspirational view of a man confronting systemic racism."

On May 20, 2021, he announced his candidacy for mayor of Montreal in the 2021 Montreal municipal election as a candidate of the Mouvement Montréal party. Holness finished in third place with 7.23% of votes and Mouvement Montréal failed to elect any of its candidates.

On June 7, 2022, Holness announced the creation of the party Bloc Montreal, being a part of the 2022 Quebec general election. It was founded after Quebec Liberal Party leader Dominique Anglade offered to work with the Coalition Avenir Québec government on certain legislation. Bloc Montreal finished with only 0.2% of votes, and it failed to elect any of its candidates, including Holness himself. The party dissolved in early 2026, with Holness endorsing the Quebec Liberal Party of Charles Milliard.

== Electoral record ==
=== Provincial ===
2022 Quebec general election: Notre-Dame-de-Grâce
Party	Candidate	Votes	%	±%
Liberal	Désirée McGraw	12,918	50.46	-12.52
Québec solidaire	Élisabeth Labelle	3,967	15.49	+3.65
Conservative	Roy Eappen	2,087	8.15	+6.64
Coalition Avenir Québec	Geneviève Lemay	1,877	7.33	-0.68
Bloc Montreal	Balarama Holness	1,701	6.64	–
Parti Québécois	Cloé Rose Jenneau	1,302	5.09	-0.37
Green	Alex Tyrrell	956	3.73	-2.94
Canadian	Constantine Eliadis	723	2.82	–
Marxist–Leninist	Rachel Hoffman	71	0.28	-0.03
Total valid votes		25,602	98.72	–
Total rejected ballots		332	1.28	–
Turnout		25,934	55.76	-0.38
Electors on the lists		46,506	–	–

=== Municipal ===
2017 Montreal municipal election results: Borough Mayor, Montreal-North
Party	Candidate	Total Votes	% of total votes
Équipe Denis Coderre	Christine Black	11,864	66%
Projet Montréal	Balarama Holness	6,038	34%
Total		17902	100%
Source: CBC News, Quebec votes, Municipal 2017

2021 Montreal municipal election: Mayor
Party	Candidate	Votes	%	±%
Projet Montréal	Valérie Plante	217,986	52.14	+0.72
Ensemble Montréal	Denis Coderre	158,751	37.97	-7.69
Mouvement Montréal	Balarama Holness	30,235	7.23	
Action Montréal	Gilbert Thibodeau	4,327	1.03	+0.68
Independent	Beverly Bernardo	1,760	0.42	
Montréal 2021	Luc Ménard	1,666	0.40	
Independent	Jean Duval	1,129	0.27	
Independent	Fang Hu	1,035	0.25	
Independent	Dimitri Mourkes	841	0.20	
Independent	Widler Jules	349	0.08	
Total valid votes		418,079	98.19	
Total rejected ballots		7,687	1.81	-0.59
Turnout		425,766	38.32	-4.15
Eligible voters		1,111,100		
Projet Montréal hold		Swing		+4.21
Source: Elections Montreal
