= Sud-Ouest borough council =

The Sud-Ouest borough council is the local governing body of Le Sud-Ouest, a borough in Montreal. The council consists of five members: the borough mayor (who also serves as a Montreal city councillor), two Montreal city councillors elected for Le Sud-Ouest's electoral districts, and two borough councillors elected for the same districts.

== Current members ==
- Borough mayor: Benoit Dorais (Projet Montréal)
- Montreal city councillor, Saint-Henri–-Petite-Bourgogne–-Pointe-Saint-Charles district: Craig Sauvé (Projet Montréal)
- Montreal city councillor, Saint-Paul–-Émard district: Anne-Marie Sigouin (Projet Montréal)
- Montreal borough councillor, Saint-Henri–-Petite-Bourgogne–-Pointe-Saint-Charles district: Sophie Thiébaut (Projet Montréal)
- Montreal borough councillor, Saint-Paul–-Émard district: Alain Vaillancourt (Projet Montréal)
