= Dominique Ollivier =

Canadian politician (born 1964)

Chair of the Montreal Executive Committee
- In office November 7, 2021 – November 13, 2023
- Preceded by: Benoit Dorais
- Succeeded by: Luc Rabouin

Montreal City Councillor for Vieux-Rosemont
- In office November 7, 2021 – November 2, 2025
- Preceded by: Christine Gosselin
- Succeeded by: Olivier Demers-Dubé

Personal details
- Born: 1964 (age 61–62) Haiti
- Party: Projet Montreal

Dominique Ollivier (born 1964) is a Canadian politician. She was chair of the Montreal Executive Committee between the 2021 Montreal municipal election and 13 November 2023, and was a councillor in the Vieux-Rosemont district of the Rosemont–La Petite-Patrie borough.

== Biography ==
Dominique Ollivier is the daughter of writer, sociologist and professor Émile Ollivier and Marie-Josée Glémaux. Her parents fled François Duvalier's regime, arriving in Amos, in Abitibi, in 1966 when Dominique was two, and moving to Montreal in 1968.

== Education and career ==
Ollivier holds a bachelor's degree in engineering from Polytechnique Montréal and a master's degree in public administration from the École nationale d'administration publique. In the early 1990s, she founded Images Interculturelles and a related magazine, the Revue Images, which she edited with Alix Laurent and which was distributed as an insert to Le Devoir. From 1995 to 2001, she held a number of positions in ministerial cabinets in the Quebec government and for social organizations.

In the 1998 Montreal municipal election, Ollivier was a candidate for former mayor Jean Doré's new party, Équipe Montréal, in the Pointe-Sainte-Charles district. She obtained 10.3% of the vote and was defeated by the incumbent city councillor, independent Marcel Sévigny.

From 2001 to 2006, Ollivier worked in the office of Bloc Québécois leader Gilles Duceppe. In August 2004, in the lead-up to the by-election in the riding of Gouin, she lost the Parti Québécois nomination to future MNA Nicolas Girard.

From 2006 to 2011, Ollivier was managing director of the Institut de coopération pour l'éducation des adultes (ICEA).

From February 2009 to September 2014, Ollivier held the position of ad hoc commissioner of the Office de consultation publique de Montréal, then became its president on September 15, 2014, a position she held until September 9, 2021.

== City councillor ==
In 2021, Ollivier ran for city councillor for the Projet Montréal party in the Vieux-Rosemont district of the Rosemont–La Petite-Patrie borough. She was elected with 70.7% of the vote.

== Chair of the Montréal Executive Committee ==
Following the 2021 Montreal municipal election, Ollivier became chair of the Montreal Executive Committee. She is the fourth woman and first black woman to hold this position. She resigned on 13 November 2023.
