= Laurence Lavigne Lalonde =

Borough mayor of Villeray–Saint-Michel–Parc-Extension, Montreal since 2021

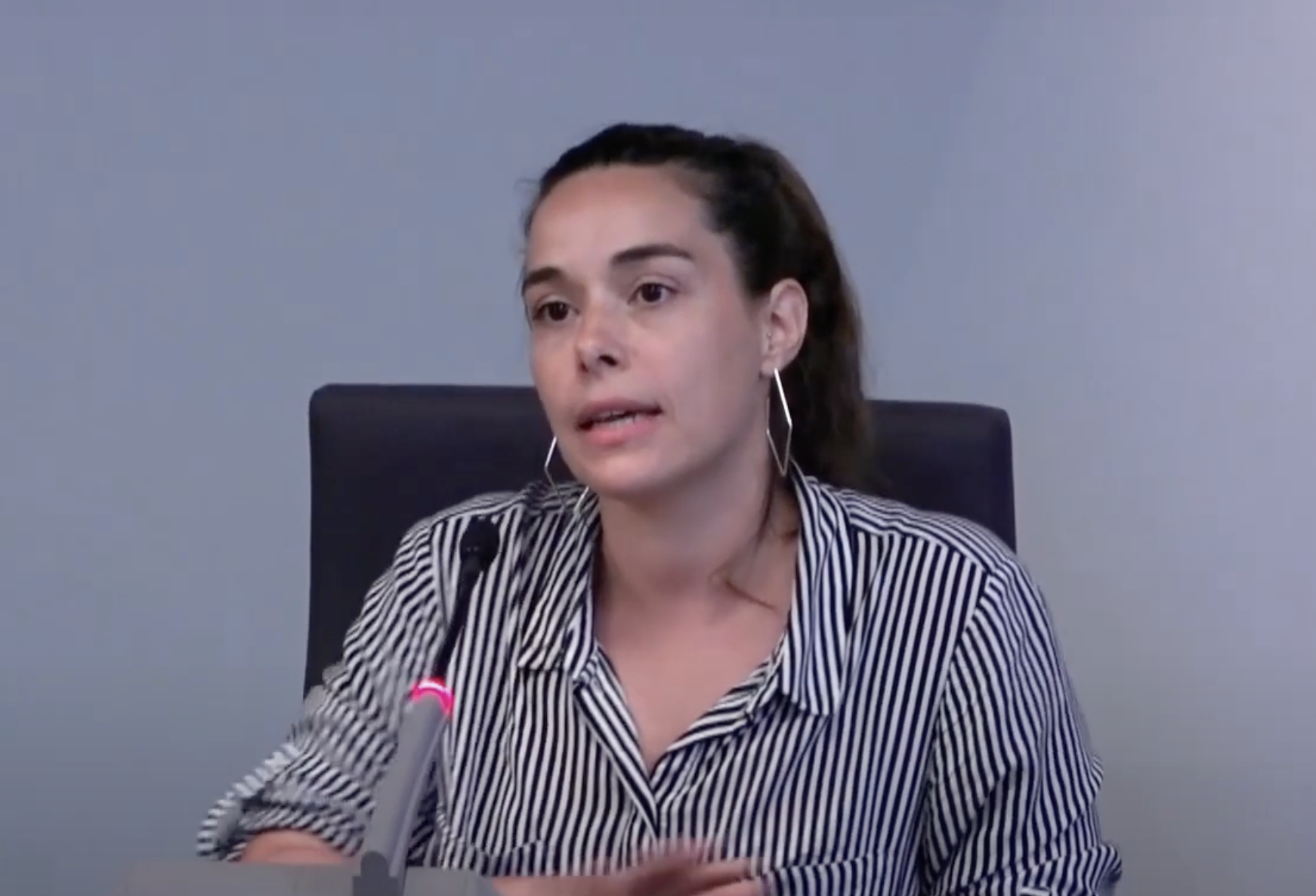
- Lavigne Lalonde in 2023

Borough mayor of Villeray–Saint-Michel–Parc-Extension
- In office November 23, 2021 – November 2, 2025
- Preceded by: Giuliana Fumagalli
- Succeeded by: Jean François Lalonde

Personal details
- Born: 1984 (age 41–42) Montreal, Quebec, Canada
- Party: Projet Montréal

Laurence Lavigne Lalonde is a Canadian politician who served as the borough mayor of Villeray–Saint-Michel–Parc-Extension, in Montreal, from 2021 to 2025. She is a member of Projet Montréal and was a candidate to succeed Valérie Plante as head of the party in the 2025 leadership contest, losing to Luc Rabouin.

Lavigne Lalonde was born in 1984 in the Montreal neighbourhood of Saint-Michel, part of the borough she currently represents. She studied psychology at the Université de Montréal, then international development and social project management at Sorbonne University in Paris. Before entering politics, she worked as a mental health responder and as a project manager for several international NGOs. In 2013, Lavigne Lalonde was elected as a city councillor in the borough of Mercier—Hochelaga-Maisonneuve. Following her re-election in 2017, she joined Montreal's executive committee, where she was named responsible for the ecological transition and for urban agriculture. She was elected mayor of the borough of Villeray–Saint-Michel–Parc-Extension on November 7, 2021.
