= Ricardo Larrivée =

Canadian chef and television host (born 1967)

Ricardo Larrivée CM OQ
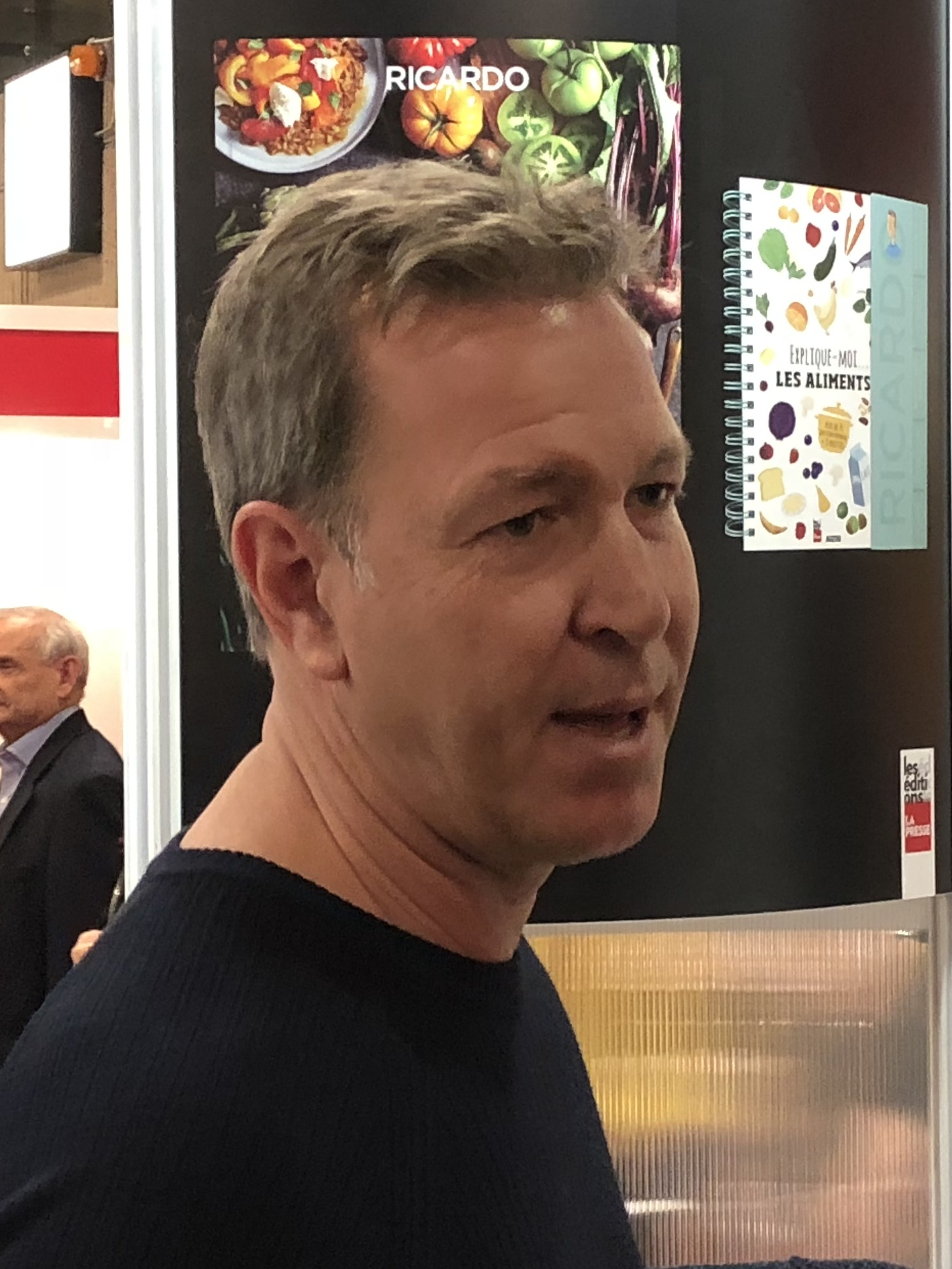
- Larrivée at a book fair stand in 2018
- Born: March 12, 1967 (age 59); Montreal, Quebec, Canada
- Education: Algonquin College; Institut de tourisme et d'hôtellerie du Québec
- Spouse: Brigitte Coutu
- Children: 3
- Culinary career
- Current restaurant: RICARDO Boutique + Café
- Television shows: Ricardo; Ricardo and Friends
- Website: www.ricardocuisine.com

Ricardo Larrivée (born March 12, 1967) OC OQ, sometimes mononymously credited as Ricardo, is a Canadian celebrity chef, television host, food writer and restaurateur. He previously presented the television shows Ricardo on Radio-Canada and Ricardo and Friends on Food Network Canada.

== Early life and education ==
In the 1980s, Larrivée enrolled in the Institut de tourisme et d'hôtellerie du Québec (ITHQ), a hospitality institute in Quebec, where he studied hotel management. He studied communications in Ottawa.

== Career ==
Larrivée moved to Regina, Saskatchewan, and accepted a job as a technician at Radio-Canada. He created both simple and elaborate dishes in his spare time and gained a reputation as a good cook. He was hired to present a food show on Radio-Canada. The Canadian Broadcasting Corporation was experiencing lay-offs, however, and Larrivée was one of those let go.

Larrivée moved back to Montreal and had the opportunity to share his recipes while working as a food reporter for television, radio and newspapers. At Radio-Canada, he contributed to several television shows, including Menu à la carte, Pêché mignon, Secrets de famille, Indicatif présent, Christiane Charrette and Beau temps pour s'étendre, in addition to appearing on Saisons de Clodine on the TVA television network. He also wrote a column in the lifestyle section of the daily newspaper La Presse and he continues to be a regular collaborator in the Saturday edition.

In 2002, Larrivée created a new TV show, Ricardo, which was shot in his home kitchen in Chambly, Quebec. He also begun to publish a magazine at the same time. This show became the longest-running cooking show in Canada. In 2006, Ricardo and Friends began to run on Food Network and lasted to three years. His cooking show employs about 125 people and is shown in about 160 countries.

Larrivée and his wife, Brigitte Coutu, operate a company headquartered in Saint-Lambert where recipes are tested and the magazines are created. Over the years, he published many books. Since 2009, he also has his own website.

In 2014, Larrivée was named a Member of the Order of Canada. The same year, Ricardo opened a new headquarters in a Montreal suburb. He has operated a restaurant in the greater Montreal area since 2016, named Café Ricardo, which will later expand to three cafés.

On April 20, 2023, he announced that he was ending full-time hosting after 21 seasons and nearly 3,000 episodes. He continues to make guest appearances on the successor show La Cuisine d'Isabelle et Ricardo, whose primary daily host is Isabelle Deschamps Plante. In 2025 he became cohost with Jean-Philippe Wauthier and Rosalie Bonenfant of the talk and interview series Deux hommes en or et Rosalie, succeeding Patrick Lagacé.

== Television shows ==
Year	Show	Role	Notes
2002–2023	Ricardo	Host	
2006-2009	Ricardo and Friends	Host	
2008	Twas the Night Before Dinner Christmas Special	Himself	Christmas special with Bob Blumer, Anthony Sedlak, Laura Calder and Anna Olson
2009	The Great Food Revolution	Himself	Episode: "The Great Food Revolution"
2012	Fermier Urbain	Host	
2015	Un chef à l'oreille	Host	
2016	Les gourmands	Co-host	
2018	On est les meilleurs	Co-host	

== Books ==
- Ma cuisine weekend (La Presse August 5, 2004 ISBN 2-923194-05-5, ISBN 978-2-923194-05-9)
- La chimie des desserts: 60 recettes de Ricardo PER Christina Blais (La Presse, 2007, ISBN 2-923194-36-5, ISBN 978-2-923194-36-3)
- Ricardo - Parce qu'on a tous de la visite (La Presse, October 2008, ISBN 2-923194-96-9, ISBN 9782923194967)
- Weekend Cooking co-written with Christian LaCroix (Whitecap Books April 5, 2006 ISBN 1-55285-787-5, ISBN 978-1-55285-787-8)
- Meals for every occasion (2009)
- La mijoteuse - de la lasagne à la crème brûlée (2012)
- Slow Cooker Favourites (2013)
- La Mijoteuse 2 (2015)
- Un Québécois dans votre cuisine, in France (2016)
- Mon premier livre de recettes (La Presse, 2015, ISBN 978-2-89705-448-9)
- Slower is Better, (HarperCollins, 2016)
- Plus de légumes (2018)
- Ultimate Slow Cooker (2018)
- Le Quiz des aliments (2019)
- Vegetable First (2019)
- À la plaque (2020)
- Sheet Pan Everything (2021)
- Multicooker Everything (2023)

== Awards and nominations ==
Anna Olson awards and nominations
Awards and nominations
Award	Wins	Nominations
Totals
Algonquin College Alumni of Distinction Awards	1	1
Gourmand World Cookbook Awards	1	1
National Magazine Awards	3	3
Prix Gémeaux	2	2
Strategy Magazine	1	1
Taste Canada Awards	1	1
Wins	9
Nominations	9

Year	Nominated work	Award	Category	Result	Ref
2012	Himself	Prix Gémeaux	Best Television Host	Won	
2015	Ricardo	Prix Gémeaux	Best Animation: Service Magazine, Cultural	Won	
2016	Ricardo	National Magazine Awards	Best Magazine	Won	
2016	"Végé inspiré"	National Magazine Awards	Feature - Gold	Won	
2018	Ricardo	National Magazine Awards	Lifestyle - Gold	Won	
2018	Ricardo	Strategy Magazine	Brand of the Year	Won	
2019	Himself	Algonquin College Alumni of Distinction Awards	Alumni of the Year	Won	
2019	Vegetables First	Television Chef Book World	Gourmand World Cookbook Awards	Won	
2019	Plus de Légumes	Taste Canada Awards	Single-Subject Cookbooks - French Language - Gold	Won	
