= Heidi Hollinger =

Canadian political photographer and politician

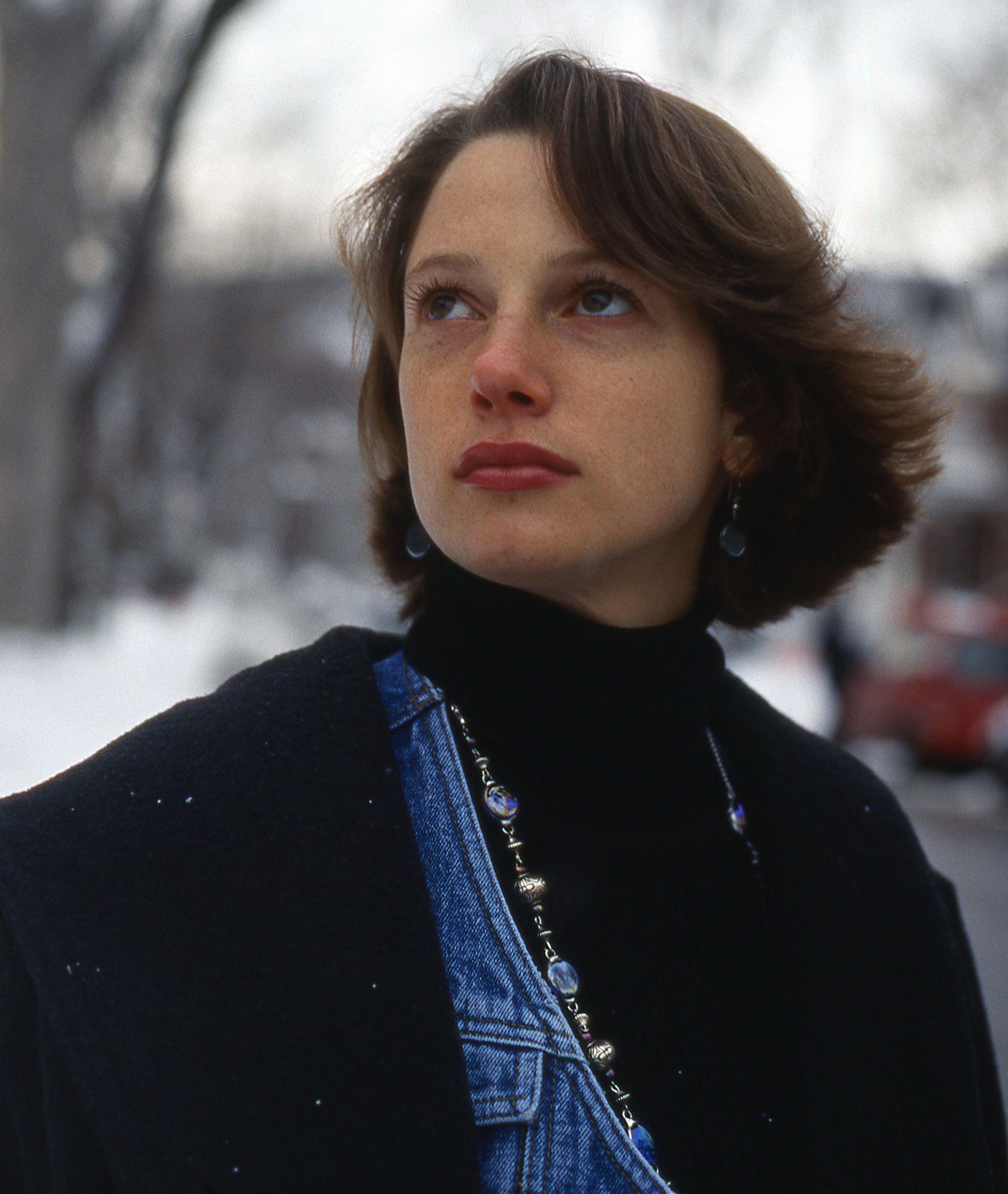
- Hollinger, Montreal, 1994
- Born: 1968 (age 57–58); Montreal, Quebec
- Education: McGill University
- Known for: photographer
- Website: heidihollinger.com

Heidi Hollinger (born 1968) is a political photographer, documentary presenter and politician.

== Life and work ==
Hollinger was born in Montreal, Quebec and attended McGill University.

After opening a photo studio in Moscow, she photographed over 100 political conventions in Russia, and traveled extensively to photograph other world leaders, including Vladimir Putin, Mikhail Gorbachev, Jean Chrétien, Fidel Castro, and the Dalai Lama.

After living for ten years in Moscow she returned to Montreal. For four years starting January 2011, she was a presenter of documentary series Waterfront Cities of The World for Discovery Channel. Each of 39 episodes of this series described one of the port cities in different parts of the world.

== Exhibitions ==
- Faces of the Opposition, Moscow Photo Center (1994); Kazan, Tatarstan (1994); Omsk, Russia (1994); Bergamot Station Galleries, Los Angeles (1995);
- Building Moscow, Moscow City Hall (1995)
- Politicians from A to Z, The State Duma, Moscow (1996)
- New Genre: The Russian Political Portrait, Manezh Gallery, Moscow (1996)
- Contemporary Artists, Metropole, Moscow (1996)
- Politicians, Almaty (1998); Saratov (1999)
- Peculiarities of National Politicians, Manezh Central Exhibition Hall, Moscow (1999); The State Duma, Moscow (2000)
- Russians, Tretyakov Gallery, Moscow (2000); Canadian Embassy, Moscow (2000); Mike Bossy, Montreal (2000).
- 100 years of Moscow (as part of group show), Montreal City Hall (2000)
- 10 years in Moscow, Canadian Parliament, Ottawa (2001); Russian Embassy, Ottawa (2001)
- The Russians Emerge, Russian Consulate, New York (2002); Philadelphia (2003); Cirque du Soleil, Montreal (2003); The Arts Factory, Las Vegas (2004); Carlu, Toronto (2004).
- The Himalayas, Biosphere, Montreal (2004)
- Selected Histories, Groupe Cossette, Montreal (2004)
- Distinct Society, HollingerCollins Gallery, Montreal (2006)
- 300 Reasons to Love Havana/300 raisons d'aimer La Havane, Montreal Museum of Fine Arts (foyer Boutique-Librairie M) (March–November 2018)

== Books ==
- Heidi Chez Les Soviets, Les Intouchables. Montreal, 1999.
- Peculiarities of Russian Politicians. Moscow: Vagrius, 1999.
- Les Russes, Les Éditions Stanké. Montreal, 2000.
- Russians. Moscow: Vagrius, 2000.
- The Russians Emerge. New York: Abbeville, 2002. ISBN 0789207575.
- Monsieur Poutine, Vous Permettez?. Montreal: Semaine, 2008.
- 300 Reasons to Love Havana. Montreal: Homme, 2018.
- 300 raisons d'aimer La Havane. Montreal: Homme, 2018.
- 300 Reasons to Love Havana, Second Edition. Montreal: Homme, 2024.

== Collections ==
Hollinger's work is held in the following public collections:

- Moscow History Museum
- Moscow House of Photography
- Montreal Museum of Contemporary Art

== Politics ==
On May 14, 2021, it was announced that Hollinger would join Ensemble Montréal as a city councilor candidate in the Saint-Henri-Est-Petite-Bourgogne-Pointe-Saint-Charles-Griffintown electoral district for the 2021 Montreal municipal election.

== Municipal electoral record ==
2021 Montreal municipal election: City councillor Saint-Henri-Est–Petite-Bourgogne–Pointe-Saint-Charles–Griffintown
Party	Candidate	Votes	%	±%
Projet Montréal	Craig Sauvé	5,694	52.82	-13.06
Ensemble Montréal	Heidi Hollinger	3,401	31.55	-0.26
Mouvement Montréal	Stephanie Henry King	1,685	15.63	new
Total valid votes/expense limit		10,780	97.29	
Total rejected ballots		300	2.71	+0.25
Turnout		11,080	34.74	-4.98
Eligible voters		31,896	–	–
