= Lesley Chesterman =

Canadian food critic and author

- Born: March 14, 1967 (age 59)
- Education: Institut de tourisme et d'hôtellerie du Québec
- Occupations: Food critic, author
- Employer: The Gazette (Montreal)
- Writing career
- Notable awards: Ordre de Montréal

Lesley Chesterman (born March 14, 1967 in Montreal) is a Quebec food critic, journalist and author. Trained as a pastry chef at the Institut de tourisme et d'hôtellerie du Québec (ITHQ), she has established herself as an influential figure in Montreal's culinary scene through her columns in The Gazette, her radio appearances and her publications.

== Biography ==
Born in Montreal, Lesley Chesterman studied pastry at the Institut de tourisme et d'hôtellerie du Québec (ITHQ) before honing her skills in France, notably in Lyon. Upon returning to Quebec, she taught cooking and pastry, then began her career as a food critic at The Gazette in 1998. She wrote columns for nearly twenty years, helping to popularize Montreal's culinary scene among both English and French-speaking audiences.

In parallel, she contributes to various publications and participates in several radio programs, including Medium Large on Ici Radio-Canada Première, where she is known for her direct and accessible style.

The New York Times has quoted her several times over the years, describing her as a recognized authority in the Montreal culinary world.

In 2020, she published Chez Lesley. Mes secrets pour tout réussir en cuisine (At Lesley's: My Secrets to Success in the Kitchen), a cookbook focused on sharing knowledge and simplicity. Her work, marked by a pursuit of authenticity and a rejection of snobbery, has earned her recognition in the culinary world.

In 2023, at the Taste of Canada Awards, Lesley Chesterman won two gold medals: one in the English category for Make Every Dish Delicious and the other in the French category for Un week-end chez Lesley (A Weekend at Lesley's).

In 2025, she was named Commander of the Order of Montreal for her contribution to Montreal's culinary culture. She was among the eight women honoured at the official inauguration of the Place des Montréalaises.

== Publications ==
- Boulangerie et patisserie techniques de base, Montreal, Éditions Trécarré, 2000, (ISBN 978-2892499681).
- Flavourville: 2003–2004 Edition, Updated and Revised, Montreal, ECW Press, 2003, (ISBN 978-1550225983).
- Chez Lesley: Mes secrets pour tout réussir en cuisine, Montreal, Éditions Cardinal, 2020, (ISBN 978-2925078029).
- Un week-end chez Lesley: Mes idées gourmandes à partager, Montreal, Éditions Cardinal, 2022, (ISBN 978-2925078661).
- Make Every Dish Delicious: Modern Classics and Essential Tips for Total Kitchen Confidence, Montreal, Simon & Schuster, 2022, (ISBN 978-1982196370).
- En accord: Cépages, recettes et prises de bec, co-écrit avec Jean Aubry, Montreal, Éditions Cardinal, 2025, (ISBN 978-2925354611).
- A Montreal Cook: Recipes and Reflections from My Kitchen, Montreal, Simon & Schuster, 2026, (ISBN 978-1-6680-6135-0).

== Distinctions ==
- 2025 – Commandeure de l'Ordre de Montréal
