= Giuliana Fumagalli =

Canadian politician

Montreal City Councillor and Borough Mayor of Villeray–Saint-Michel–Parc-Extension
- In office November 17, 2017 – November 18, 2021
- Preceded by: Anie Samson
- Succeeded by: Laurence Lavigne Lalonde

Personal details
- Party: Quartiers Montréal

Giuliana Fumagalli is a Canadian politician, who was elected to Montreal City Council in the 2017 municipal election. A past member of Projet Montréal, she currently sits as a member of Quartiers Montréal and served as the borough mayor of Villeray–Saint-Michel–Parc-Extension. In the 2021 Montreal municipal election, Fumagalli was defeated by Laurence Lavigne Lalonde.

2017 Montreal Municipal Election, Villeray-Saint Michel-Parc Extension
Candidate	Votes	Vote share
Giuliana Fumagalli	19,196	54.07%
Anie Samson	16,306	45.93%
Total	35,501	100%
Source: CBC News, Quebec votes, Municipal 2017
