= Cathy Wong =

Canadian politician

- Cathy Wong in 2019.

Mayor of Plateau-Mont-Royal
- In office 2025–current
- Preceded by: Luc Rabouin

Speaker of Montreal City Council
- In office 2017–2020
- Preceded by: Frantz Benjamin
- Succeeded by: Serge Sasseville

Montreal City Councillor for Ville-Marie
- In office 2017–2021
- Constituency: Peter-McGill

Personal details
- Party: Projet Montréal (2019–present); Ensemble Montréal (2017–2019)
- Education: UQAM

Cathy Wong is a municipal politician in Montreal, Quebec, Canada. She was elected Mayor of the Montreal borough of Plateau-Mont-Royal in 2025. She served on Montreal City Council as councillor for the Peter-McGill district (Ville-Marie) from 2017 until 2021, and was the speaker of Montreal City Council. At 30 years old on her election, she was the first person of Chinese descent to serve at City Hall as the council's first female speaker. She was also the first opposition party member to sit in the chair. She replaced Frantz Benjamin, the first black speaker of the council.

As part of her role, Wong is mandated to raise citizens' access to city hall and municipal democracy, especially for women, youth, ethnic minorities, new residents, and Indigenous people, key targets in mayor Valérie Plante's election campaign. A Montreal diversity and inclusion advisory panel was a move by mayor Plante, with a one-year deadline to recommend necessary changes at city hall and related bodies.

Also under Wong's presidency, Montreal planned to rescind a historical but uncodified regulation which required male councilors to wear ties at council meetings. A city council commission supervising procedural rules and conduct, which she leads, decided to drop the rule to modernize City Hall.

As a member of the City of Montreal’s Executive Committee, she oversaw diversity, employment inclusion, the French language, and the fight against racism and discrimination from 2020 to 2021.

Wong was a member of the Équipe Denis Coderre party (before its post-election reconstitution as Ensemble Montréal) in the municipal elections of November 2017. On October 2, 2019, she joined the governing Projet Montréal party, citing its social values.

Wong did not run for reelection in 2021.

In November 2021, Wong was hired as Vice President of Equity, Diversity & Inclusion and Official Languages at Telefilm Canada.

She was elected to be borough mayor of Le Plateau-Mont-Royal in 2025.

== Honours and awards ==
In 2016, the Conseil des diplômés de la Faculté de droit de l'UQAM presented Wong with an award for contribution to upcoming generations; Wong had earned a bachelor's degree in civil law from UQAM.
