= Place des Montréalaises =

Public square in Montreal, Quebec, Canada

- Location within Montreal
- Type: Town square
- Location: Old Montreal, Ville-Marie Montreal, Quebec, Canada
- Coordinates: 45°30′35″N 73°33′23″W
- Created: 2025
- Operator: City of Montreal
- Public transit: Champ-de-Mars

Place des Montréalaises (French pronunciation: [plas de mɔ̃ʁealɛz], Square of Montréal's women) is a public square in the borough of Ville-Marie, Montreal, Quebec, Canada. The site bridges downtown and Old Montreal via a universally accessible pedestrian link centred on the Champ-de-Mars metro station. It was inaugurated on 16 May 2025.

== History ==
An international, anonymous, multidisciplinary design competition selected the winning concept in 2018. The team led by Lemay, with artist Angela Silver and AtkinsRéalis, was chosen to develop the project. Construction began in 2022, with the City targeting a 2025 opening; the square was inaugurated on 16 May 2025.

== Location and description ==
Place des Montréalaises is built over a portion of Autoroute Ville-Marie and the Berri ramp, beside Champ-de-Mars station and near Montreal City Hall. The project reconnects pedestrian routes between downtown and Old Montreal by covering highway infrastructure with new public space, adding a universally accessible slope and walkway, and improving adjacent intersections.

== Design and features ==
The design is organized around three principal components:

- Flower meadow, a vegetated, inclined urban landscape that functions as a belvedere and seasonal garden;
- Miroir des Montréalaises, a circular artwork by Angela Silver bearing the names of the 14 victims of the 1989 École Polytechnique massacre on one side and seven pioneering Montréal women (Jeanne Mance, Harriet Brooks, Idola Saint-Jean, Ida Roth Steinberg, Agnès Vautier, Jessie Maxwell-Smith, and Myra Cree) on the other;
- Commemorative staircase, featuring a "field of letters" motif alluding to the names of Montréal women and framing the Marcelle Ferron stained glass at Champ-de-Mars station.

Refinements to the final concept included universal-design adjustments to slopes and lighting, a cycling connection between Rue Viger and Rue Saint-Antoine, reworked approaches at nearby intersections, a pedestrian link touching down near Rue Gosford and Rue Saint-Antoine, and additional greening including new tree plantings. Some descriptions of the original concept note 21 plant varieties blooming in succession as a tribute to 21 women.

== Inauguration ==
On November 20, 2017, the site of the future Place des Montréalaises was inaugurated by Mayor Valérie Plante, less than a month after her election. The name Place des Montréalaises was officially registered with the Commission de toponymie du Québec a few days later, on December 5, 2017.

On May 16, 2025, Mayor Plante inaugurated the fully developed permanent square. On this occasion, she also presented the insignia of the Ordre de Montréal to an entirely female cohort. The women honoured at the ceremony were:

- Janette Bertrand, journalist, television drama writer, and radio and television host.
- Yvette Bonny, former pediatric hematologist and university professor.
- France Charbonneau, former judge of the Quebec Superior Court.
- Lesley Chesterman, pastry chef, author, host, and food critic.
- Léa Cousineau, the first woman to chair the Executive Committee of the City of Montreal.
- Elisapie, Inuk singer-songwriter, director, producer, and activist.
- Pauline Marois, the first female Premier of Quebec.
- Kim Thúy, author of the novel Ru and television host.

The inauguration drew criticism from Coderre, who accused the Plante administration of taking credit for a project launched under his tenure. He lamented the omission of his team's role and the absence of an invitation to the ceremony.

== Reception and safety ==
In the weeks following opening, local media reported falls and injuries associated with a drainage detail integrated into the paving. The City temporarily installed cones, signage, and barriers while assessing mitigations. In inauguration-week coverage, the City also indicated corrective work would be carried out during summer 2025.

== Cost ==
Competition documents set the initial construction budget at C$34,080,000 for the public square and pedestrian overpass. In September 2018, the City presented a revised project budget of C$62.4 million, down from a 2017 estimate of C$74.4 million, after opting for an overpass rather than a tunnel. Coverage at the time also specified that the C$62.4 million budget excluded the separate provincial cost of covering Autoroute Ville-Marie, evaluated at approximately C$68 million. By May 2025, the approved project budget was reported at C$98.8 million, and broadcasters commonly summarized the total at "about C$100 million."

== Access ==
The square is adjacent to Champ-de-Mars station on the Orange Line and incorporates a universally accessible route between the station area, City Hall, and Old Montreal. A through-bike connection links corridors on Rue Viger and Rue Saint-Antoine.

== See also ==
- Valérie Plante
- Champ-de-Mars
- Toponym'Elles
