= Abdelhaq Sari =

Canadian politician

Abdelhaq Sari MP

Member of Parliament for Bourassa
- Incumbent
- Assumed office April 28, 2025
- Preceded by: Emmanuel Dubourg

Montreal City Councillor for Marie-Clarac
- In office November 5, 2017 – April 28, 2025
- Preceded by: Chantal Rossi
- Succeeded by: Youssef Hariri

Personal details
- Born: Morocco
- Party: Liberal (federal); Ensemble Montréal (municipal)
- Website: abdelhaqsari.liberal.ca/en/

Abdelhaq Sari MP is a Canadian politician from the Liberal Party of Canada. He was elected Member of Parliament for Bourassa in the 2025 Canadian federal election. He represents the Bourassa district in Montréal-Nord. Prior to be elected to the House of Commons, Sari served as a Montreal city councillor for the district of Marie-Clarac in Montreal North. He was elected in 2017 and re-elected in the 2021 Montreal municipal election.

== Federal Electoral record ==
2025 Canadian federal election: Bourassa
Party	Candidate	Votes	%	±%	Expenditures
Liberal	Abdelhaq Sari	21,198	58.55	–1.84	$37,813.55
Bloc Québécois	Jency Mercier	6,206	17.14	–1.56	$4,776.18
Conservative	Néhémie Dumay	5,905	16.31	+9.31	$2,935.26
New Democratic	Catherine Gauvin	2,137	5.90	–2.10	$0.00
People's	Jean-Marc Lamothe	433	1.20	–2.45	$18.03
No affiliation	Philippe Tessier	183	0.51	N/A	$462.83
Marxist–Leninist	Dominique Théberge	140	0.39	N/A	$0.00
Total valid votes/expense limit		36,202	97.50	–	$121,148.70
Total rejected ballots		929	2.50		
Turnout		37,131	56.64		
Eligible voters		65,557			
Liberal hold		Swing		-0.14	
Source: Elections Canada
Note: number of eligible voters does not include voting day registrations.

== Municipal ==
2021 Montreal municipal election: City Councillor-Marie-Clarac
Party	Candidate	Votes	%	±%
Ensemble Montréal	Abdelhaq Sari	5,411	61.05	+10.25
Projet Montréal	Mathieu Léonard	3,425	38.95	-2.84
Total valid votes/expense limit		8,863	95.24	
Total rejected ballots		443	4.76	-1.49
Turnout		9,306	34.11%	-2.09
Eligible voters		27,280	–	–

2017 Montreal municipal election: City Councillor-Marie-Clarac
Party	Candidate	Votes	%	±%
Équipe Denis Coderre	Abdelhaq Sari	4,881	50.80	-12.49
Projet Montréal	Mathieu Léonard	4,015	41.79	+26.44
Independent	Marie-Carmel Michel	712	7.41	
Total valid votes/expense limit		9,608	93.75	
Total rejected ballots		641	6.25	-0.60
Turnout		10,249	36.20	-2.76
Eligible voters		28,314	–	–
