= Ricardo (TV series) =

- Presented by: Ricardo Larrivée
- Country of origin: Canada

Production
- Running time: 30 minutes (including commercials)

Original release
- Network: Radio-Canada
- Release: 2002 – 2023

Ricardo is a daily French-language cooking show that aired weekdays on Radio-Canada from 2002 to 2023, hosted by Ricardo Larrivée. He presents accessible recipes alone or accompanied by a guest or a member of his rotating panel of contributors: nutritionists Hélène Laurendeau and Christina Blais, gardener Pierre Gingras and sommelier François Chartier.

The show moved in 2006 from a television studio to a purpose-built kitchen in Ricardo's home in Chambly, Quebec.

Ricardo spun off Ricardo and Friends, an English-language adaptation of the series.

Larrivée announced in 2023 that he was stepping away from full-time hosting. The show was replaced in the fall with La Cuisine d'Isabelle et Ricardo, hosted primarily by Isabelle Deschamps Plante although Larrivée still makes guest appearances as a contributor.
