= Anne-Marie Sigouin =

Canadian politician

Montreal City Councillor for Saint-Paul–Émard–Saint-Henri-Ouest
- In office 2013–2025
- Preceded by: Daniel Bélanger
- Succeeded by: Nicolas Jolicoeur

Personal details
- Party: Projet Montréal

Anne-Marie Sigouin is a Canadian politician, who served on Montreal City Council as representative for the Saint-Paul–Émard–Saint-Henri-Ouest district in the borough of Le Sud-Ouest.

A member of the Projet Montréal political party, she was first elected in the 2013 municipal election and reelected in the 2017 election. She was also named by Mayor Valérie Plante as a designated councillor on the Ville-Marie borough council, which includes two city councillors from elsewhere in the city chosen by the mayor.
