= Ricardo and Friends =

- Starring: Ricardo Larrivée
- Country of origin: Canada
- Original language: English

Production
- Running time: 30 minutes (with commercials)

Original release
- Network: Food Network Canada

Ricardo and Friends is an English language cooking show by Montreal based host Ricardo Larrivée. It is broadcast by Food Network.

After achieving success in the French language market of Canada with Ricardo, plans were underway to have Larrivée create an English speaking cooking show. Thus Ricardo and Friends was created.

During each episode Larrivée travels throughout Quebec and showcases different cuisine and products of the province such as beer, cheese, fresh herbs and many more. Larrivée has also showcased cuisine and products from other parts of Canada. The featured food or beverage item is usually added to a dish during the show.

Ricardo usually prepares the dishes for friends and family.

The show takes place at a purpose-built kitchen in Ricardo's home in Chambly, Quebec.

== Broadcasters ==
Current

- Food Network Canada - original broadcast
