= Luc Ferrandez =

Canadian politician

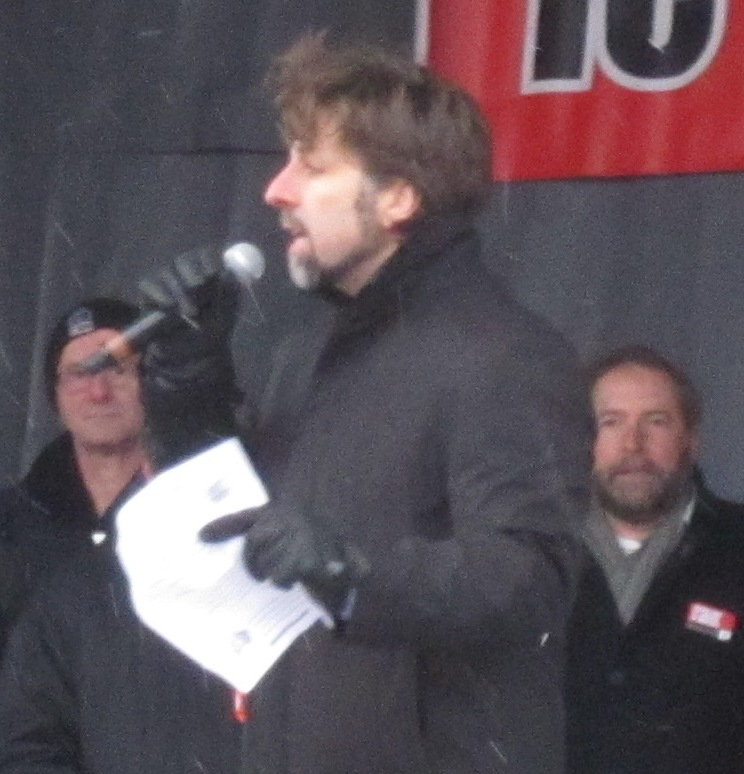

Borough mayor for Le Plateau-Mont-Royal and Montreal City Councillor
- In office January 1, 2010 – May 14, 2019
- Preceded by: Michel Labrecque
- Succeeded by: Luc Rabouin

Personal details
- Party: Projet Montréal
- Occupation: Management consultant

Luc Ferrandez is a Canadian politician. He was the interim leader of the municipal party Projet Montreal from 2014. From 2009 to 2019 he served as the mayor of the borough of Le Plateau-Mont-Royal. He is a member of the Projet Montréal municipal political party.

== Education and early career ==
Ferrandez pursued doctoral studies in economic policies at the École des hautes études en sciences sociales in Paris. He holds an MA and a BA in political science from Université du Québec à Montréal.

He previously served as director of communications for CAE Inc., as a senior communications advisor at Hydro-Québec and was a senior researcher in environmental matters for the French National Centre for Scientific Research. Most recently, he worked as a management consultant. He was the host of the public television show "Bozéjeunnnes" on Radio-Québec in the early 1980s.

== Borough mayor ==
As borough mayor of Le Plateau-Mont-Royal, Ferrandez reduced snow removal services. In order to reduce expenses related to overtime compensation, he refused to send snow removal crews out immediately following snow storms, on weekends, or when the total accumulation was five inches or less. The move has garnered both support and criticism.

He resigned as borough mayor on May 14, 2019, because he could not convince other municipal politicians of the importance of environmental issues.
