= Diallo Fadima Touré =

Malian politician

Diallo Fadima Touré is a French-Canadian returnee to Mali, and a former Minister of Culture and Tourism of Mali. She served in the first and second cabinets led by prime minister Cheick Modibo Diarra from 24 April 2012 until 15 December 2012.
