= Institut de tourisme et d'hôtellerie du Québec =

Canadian institution specializing in professional training related to tourism

Coordinates: 45.5181°N 73.5684°W

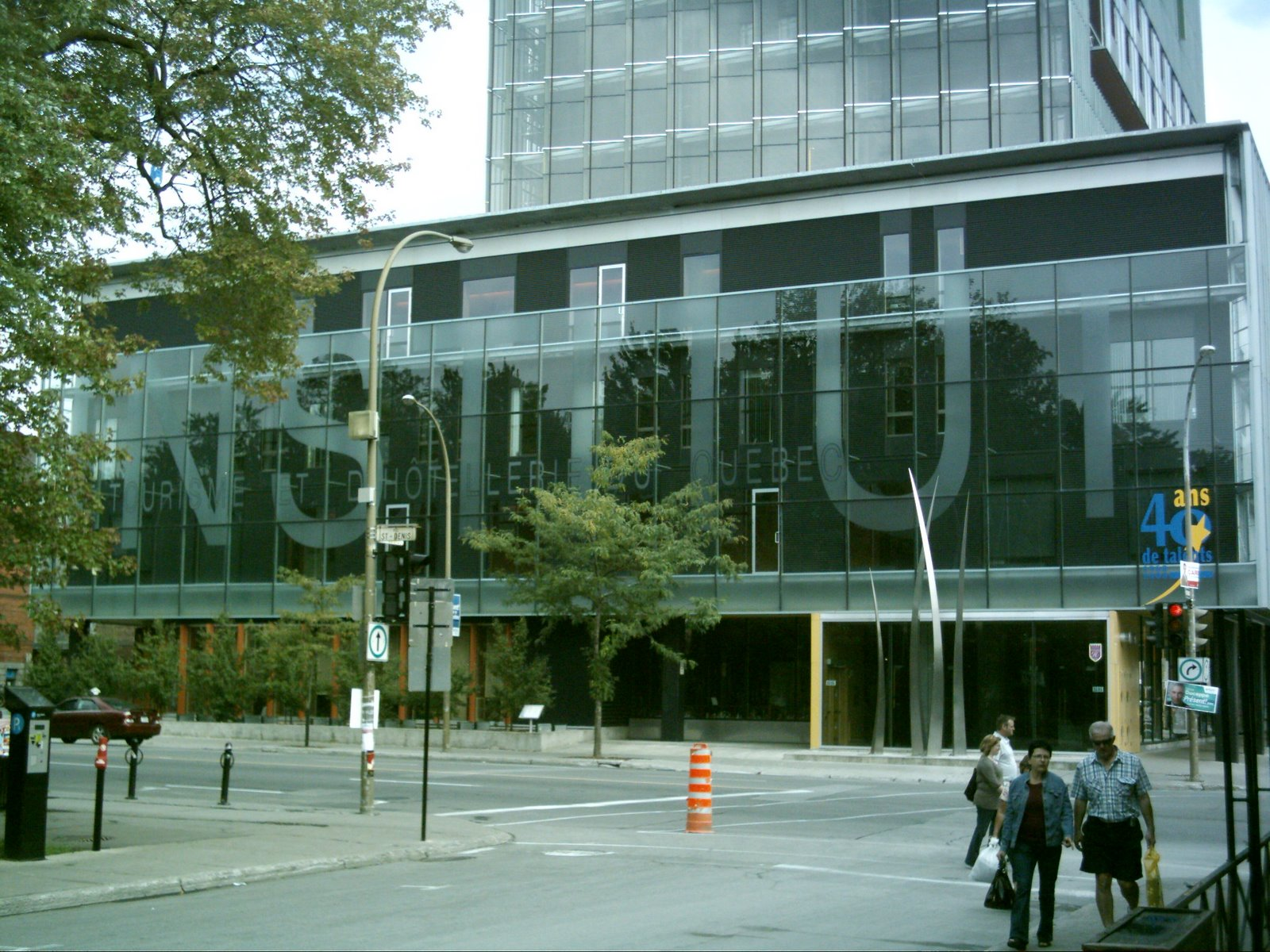
The Institut de tourisme et d'hôtellerie du Québec on Saint Denis Street near Saint-Louis Square in Le Plateau-Mont-Royal.

The Institut de tourisme et d'hôtellerie du Québec (French pronunciation: [ɛ̃stity də tuʁism e dotɛlʁi dy kebɛk], abbr. ITHQ; English: Quebec Institute of Tourism and Hotel Management) is an institution specializing in professional training related to tourism, hotel management and restaurant management. The ITHQ is the only school in Quebec that provides secondary-level, college-level, university-level and continuing education.
