= Luc Rabouin =

Leader of Projet Montréal since 2025

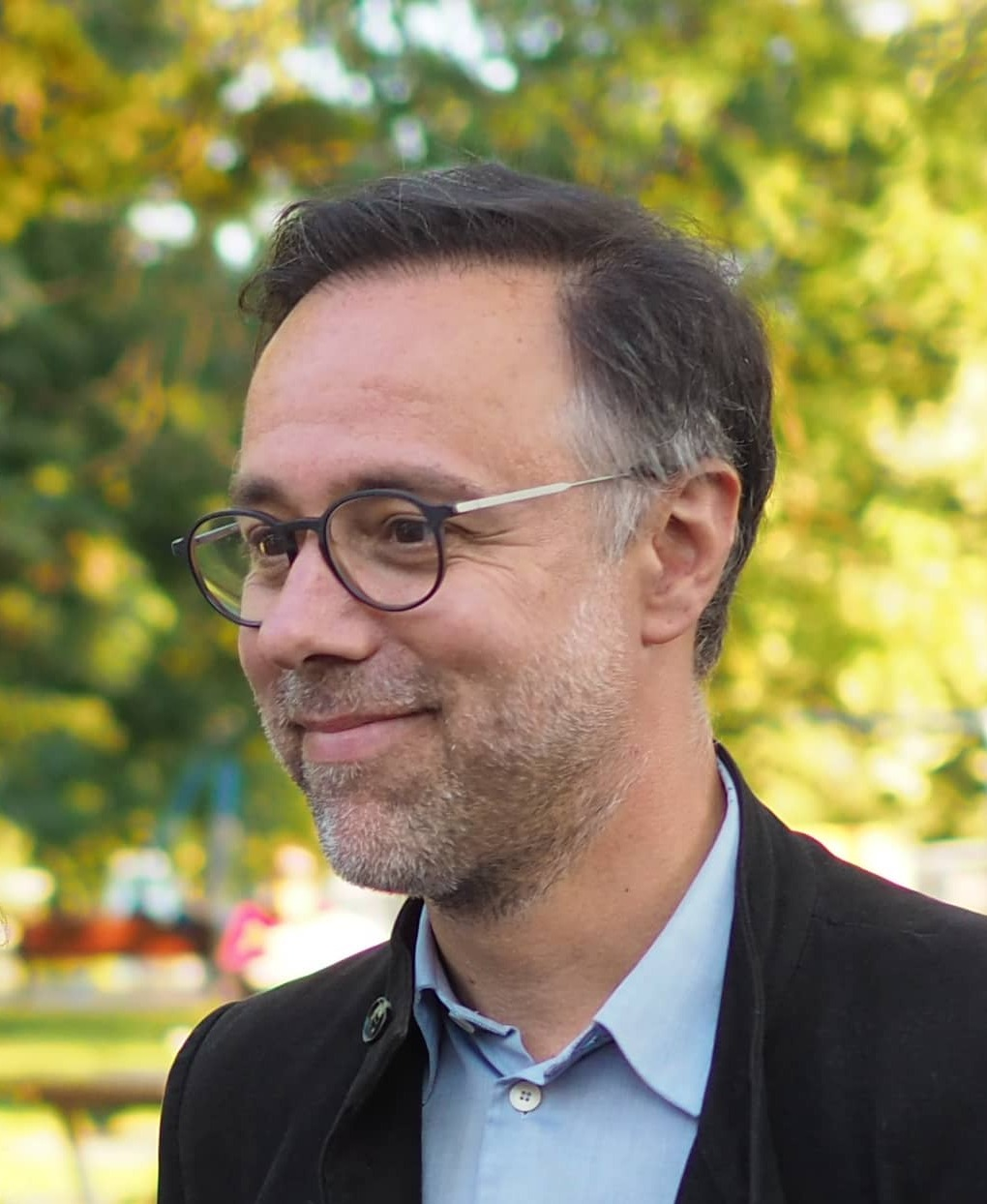
- Rabouin in 2019

Mayor of Plateau-Mont-Royal
- In office 17 October 2019 – 13 November 2025
- Preceded by: Luc Ferrandez
- Succeeded by: Cathy Wong

Leader of Projet Montréal
- In office 15 March 2025 – 12 November 2025
- Preceded by: Valérie Plante
- Succeeded by: Ericka Alneus

Personal details
- Party: Projet Montréal
- Education: Université de Montréal

Luc Rabouin (French: [lyk ʁabwɛ̃]) is a Canadian politician who served as the leader of Projet Montréal between March and November 2025. He was the mayor of the Montreal borough of Plateau-Mont-Royal and president of the executive council of the City of Montreal until November 2025 when he resigned. He was responsible for finance, economic development and education in the administration of Montreal Mayor Valérie Plante.

== Biography ==
=== Education ===
Rabouin has a bachelor's degree in psychosociology of communication at the University of Quebec in Montreal, in local economic development at Concordia University, and in political science as part of his master's degree at the University of Montreal.

=== Mayor of Plateau-Mont-Royal ===
Rabouin was elected mayor of Plateau-Mont-Royal in a by-election on October 6, 2019, following the resignation of his predecessor, Luc Ferrandez. Rabouin was easily elected, obtaining 67% of the votes against Ensemble Montréal candidate Jean-Pierre Szaraz (17.3%) and Vrai changement pour Montréal candidate Marc-Antoine Desjardins (15.6%).

The mayor was re-elected with a larger majority in the 2021 Montreal municipal election, garnering 74.6% of the vote against Shant Karabajak of Ensemble Montréal (18%) and Daniel Vazquez of Mouvement Montréal (7.4%).

=== Leader of Projet Montréal ===
On December 12, 2024, Rabouin announced his intention to run for the leadership of Projet Montréal, following incumbent leader and mayor Valérie Plante's announcement that she would not seek a third term as mayor. He is the second to announce his candidacy for the race, after the former president of the party, Guedwig Bernier. He won the leadership race in the fourth round, with 59.2% of the vote. He ran for mayor of Montreal in the 2025 municipal election, placing second to Soraya Martinez Ferrada. He resigned as leader of Projet Montréal on the night of the election.

== See also ==
- Projet Montréal
- Plateau-Mont-Royal
- Valérie Plante
