= Denis Coderre =

Canadian politician (born 1963)

The Honourable Denis Coderre PC
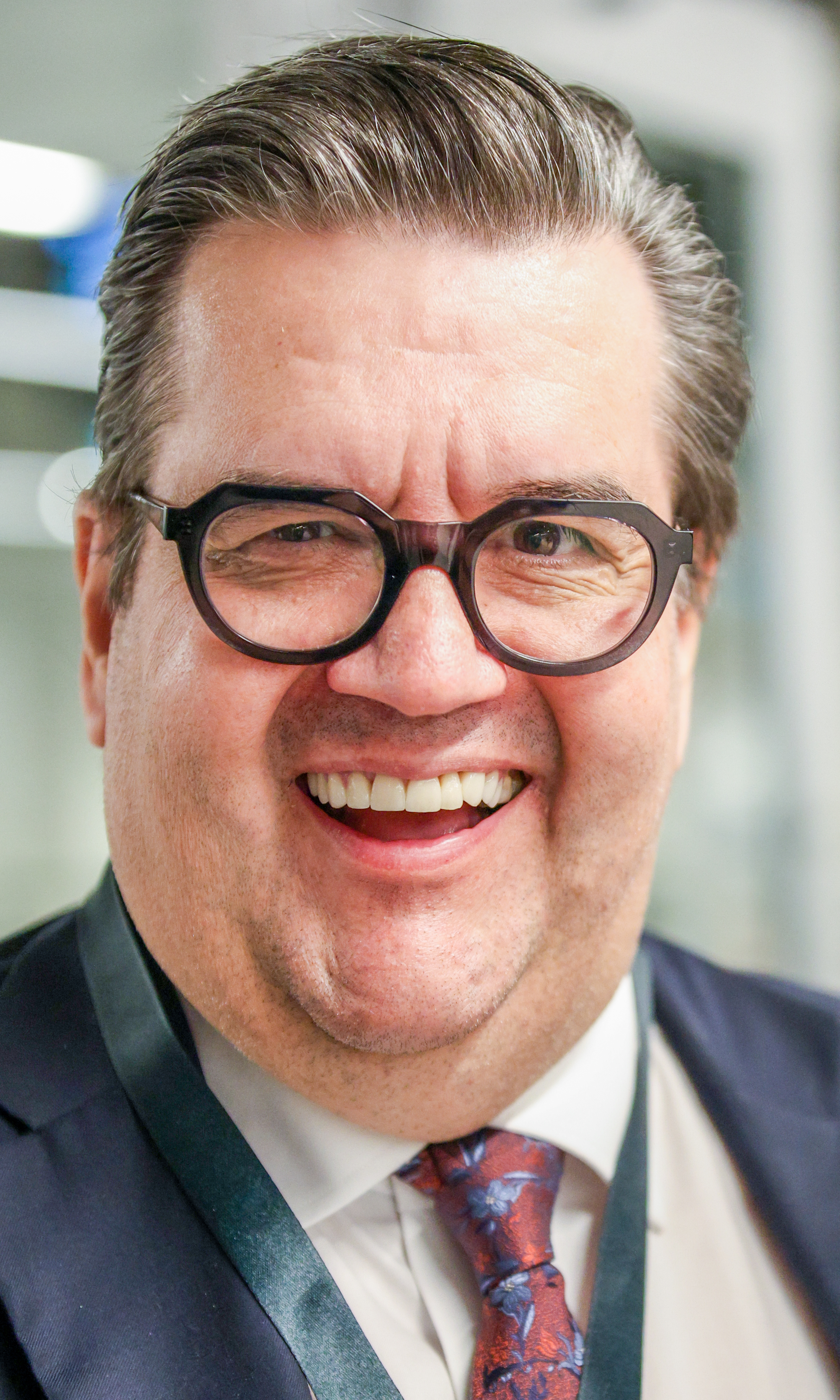
- Coderre in 2023

44th Mayor of Montreal
- In office November 14, 2013 – November 16, 2017
- Preceded by: Laurent Blanchard
- Succeeded by: Valérie Plante

President of the Queen's Privy Council for Canada
- In office December 12, 2003 – July 19, 2004
- Prime Minister: Paul Martin
- Preceded by: Stéphane Dion
- Succeeded by: Lucienne Robillard

Ministers of Citizenship and Immigration
- In office January 15, 2002 – December 11, 2003
- Prime Minister: Jean Chrétien
- Preceded by: Elinor Caplan
- Succeeded by: Judy Sgro

Secretary of State (Amateur Sport)
- In office August 3, 1999 – January 14, 2002
- Prime Minister: Jean Chrétien
- Minister: Sheila Copps
- Preceded by: Sheila Copps (as minister of Amateur Sport)
- Succeeded by: Paul DeVillers

Member of Parliament for Bourassa
- In office September 22, 1997 – June 2, 2013
- Preceded by: Osvaldo Nunez
- Succeeded by: Emmanuel Dubourg

Personal details
- Born: July 25, 1963 (age 62) Joliette, Quebec, Canada
- Party: Liberal (federal); Quebec Liberal (provincial); Ensemble Montréal (municipal)
- Spouse: Chantale Renaud
- Children: 2
- Profession: Insurance broker; public relations officer; announcer

Denis Coderre PC (French pronunciation: [dəni kɔdɛʁ]; born July 25, 1963) is a Canadian politician who served as the 44th mayor of Montreal from 2013 to 2017.

Coderre was involved in federal politics as a member of the Liberal Party of Canada, serving as the member of Parliament (MP) for the riding of Bourassa from 1997 until 2013 and Immigration Minister from 2002 to 2003. Taking office as mayor of Montreal in 2013, he saw his reelection bid defeated in 2017 by Valérie Plante. In 2021, he lost again to Plante.

As mayor, Coderre unveiled the Réseau électrique métropolitain (REM) project in 2016 alongside Michael Sabia, then CEO of the Caisse de dépôt et placement du Québec (CDPQ).

== Background ==
Born in Joliette, Quebec, Coderre is the son of Elphege Coderre, a carpenter, and Lucie Baillargeon. The family moved to Montréal-Nord in 1973, where Coderre attended École Secondaire Henri-Bourassa and Cégep Marie-Victorin. He has a BA in political science from the Université de Montréal and a Master in Business Administration (MBA) from the University of Ottawa.

== Federal politics ==
=== Unsuccessful Liberal candidate ===
Coderre ran unsuccessfully three times prior to being elected: first, in the 1988 election in the riding of Joliette, losing to the Progressive Conservative candidate, Gaby Larrivée; second, in a 1990 by-election in the riding of Laurier—Sainte-Marie, losing to Gilles Duceppe; and third, in the 1993 elections in the riding of Bourassa, defeated by the Bloc Québécois candidate, Osvaldo Núñez.

=== Member of Parliament ===
Coderre was elected as a member of Parliament in 1997 representing the riding of Bourassa, located in Montreal, and was re-elected in the 2000, 2004, 2006, 2008, and 2011 federal elections. In August 1999 he was appointed secretary of state for amateur sport.

==== Cabinet minister ====
In January 2002, he was appointed immigration minister.

On December 12, 2003, prime minister Paul Martin advised governor general Adrienne Clarkson to appoint Coderre to the Cabinet as president of the Queen's Privy Council for Canada where he was responsible for a number of files, such as the creation of the new Public Service Human Resources Management Agency. He was also the federal interlocutor for Métis and non-status Indians, the minister responsible for La Francophonie and the minister responsible for the Office of Indian Residential Schools Resolution. Coderre was not re-appointed to Cabinet following the 2004 general election, despite being re-elected in his riding.

As minister of immigration, Coderre supervised the application of the Immigration and Refugee Protection Act, which came into effect on June 28, 2002. As secretary of state for amateur sport, Coderre successfully negotiated a number of national and international agreements and helped to establish the World Anti-Doping Agency in Montreal.

Adil Charkaoui

As minister of immigration, Coderre was responsible for the detention of Adil Charkaoui, a Moroccan immigrant with a checkered travel history, on a security certificate. Restrictions on Charkaoui's conditional release were gradually lifted, and were cancelled in September 2009, on his final release order by Federal Court judge Danièle Tremblay-Lamer.

==== Sponsorship scandal ====
During the events of the sponsorship scandal, Coderre was accused of frequent confidential conversations with Pierre Tremblay, head of the Communications Coordination Services Branch of Public Works. Coderre has denied these allegations. His previous position as vice-president of public affairs for Le Groupe Polygone Éditeurs Inc. was judged to be a key connecting factor. Close links to Claude Boulay of Groupe Everest, another actor in the sponsorship scandal, were also made during the Gomery Inquiry.

==== Shane Doan incident ====
During the 2006 election, Coderre accused National Hockey League player Shane Doan of uttering ethnic slurs directed against French-speaking referees at a game in Montreal. Coderre wrote a letter to the Canadian Olympic Committee asking them to keep Doan off Canada's 2006 hockey team competing at the Olympics in Turin, Italy. The Globe and Mail columnist Eric Duhatschek noted that "the NHL is tough on ethnic slurs ... if Mr. Coderre has any proof he should produce it. Otherwise he should just shut up." Hockey commentator John Davidson accused Coderre of "grandstanding" and criticized his accusation, saying that "a person shouldn't go stand on a platform and yell and scream about it when he doesn't even know the facts."

Doan was given a gross misconduct penalty for verbal abuse of the officials at the end of the December 13, 2005 game between his team, the Phoenix Coyotes, and the Montreal Canadiens. Referees and linesmen for the game were all Francophones from Quebec. Although one of the linesmen, Michel Cormier, filed a report against the player, Doan was cleared by NHL's chief disciplinarian and executive vice-president Colin Campbell, who concluded that the allegations were baseless. Doan himself has denied that he ever made the ethnic slur.

In January 2006, Doan sued Coderre for character defamation seeking $250,000 in damages with Doan promising to donate all damages awarded to charities to benefit Canadians. In April 2007, Coderre counter-sued Doan for defamation seeking $45,000 in damages.

==== Opposition MP ====
Coderre won re-election to the House of Commons in 2006, but the Liberals lost the campaign and became the official opposition. Coderre was the Liberal defence critic. In 2007, Coderre made allegations against the previous chief of Defence Staff general Rick Hillier of being a "prop". Hillier, in return, accused Coderre of being more concerned with party image than in protecting Canadian Forces members. In October 2007, Coderre made a self-planned visit to Afghanistan to visit the war-torn country and the Canadian Forces in the Kandahar region. He criticized the Harper government who did not invite him on an official tour of the country that was made by ministers Bev Oda and Maxime Bernier a few days before him. Consequently, Coderre, as Liberal defence critic, had to travel by himself at his own expense. He then mentioned that the mission in Afghanistan must change in 2009. The government had accused him of staging a stunt while he fired back that the Conservatives overestimated the success of the mission.

===== Quebec lieutenant =====
On January 22, 2009, Coderre became the Quebec lieutenant of Liberal leader Michael Ignatieff. He had been offered the same assignment by former leader Stéphane Dion, but had declined the offer.

In 2009, future Green Party of Canada co-leader Jonathan Pedneault sought the Liberal nomination in his home district of Longueuil-Pierre-Boucher. Coderre, the party's lieutenant in Quebec, blocked his bid and appointed a candidate, despite Ignatieff's assurances the party would hold open nominations in all ridings not represented by a sitting MP. This prompted Pedneault to co-author an op-ed in La Presse calling on Ignatieff to uphold his promise to democratize the party.

On September 28, 2009, Coderre resigned as Quebec lieutenant because of a disagreement with Ignatieff. Coderre had been tasked with picking 'star candidates' for the next election, attempting to replace Montreal-area MPs Stéphane Dion, Lise Zarac, and Bernard Patry, as well as Laval MP Raymonde Folco, at Ignatieff's request. Coderre had chosen Nathalie Le Prohon to run in Outremont, formerly a Liberal safe seat held by the NDP's Thomas Mulcair. However, Martin Cauchon was seeking a return to politics and wanted to run in Outremont, a riding he had held for 11 years prior to 2004 when then-Liberal leader Paul Martin would not guarantee Cauchon's nomination. Cauchon had served as Jean Chrétien's minister of justice and Quebec lieutenant. Cauchon preferred to seek help from Alfred Apps from Toronto instead of talking to Coderre and his team. Cauchon and Coderre had previously been close when both were part of Chrétien's cabinet, but some suggest that Coderre now saw Cauchon as a potential rival for influence over the Quebec wing of the Liberals, and perhaps in a future leadership convention. Ignatieff initially sided with Coderre, then reversed his decision and allowed Cauchon to run in Outremont.

In Coderre's first press conference after resigning as Quebec lieutenant, he criticized Ignatieff's aides, all of whom were from Toronto. Coderre also skipped votes in the House of Commons in protest. Ignatieff later warned that Coderre would face expulsion from caucus if he did "any more damage to the party."

In 2012, Coderre confirmed that he would not run for the leadership of the federal Liberal Party.

== Mayoralty ==
=== 2013 election ===
Coderre resigned on June 2, 2013 to run for mayor of Montreal in the 2013 Montreal municipal election. He formed the Montreal municipal party Équipe Denis Coderre pour Montréal (alternatively Équipe Denis Coderre) though he had no previous provincial or municipal experience. Coderre was elected mayor of Montreal on November 3, 2013.

=== 2017 election ===
Coderre ran for re-election in the 2017 Montreal municipal election on November 5, 2017. In a surprise, Coderre lost the mayoral race to Valérie Plante, making her the first female elected Mayor for the city of Montréal. After the election loss, he announced that he would be retiring from politics.

=== Tenure ===
On January 31, 2015, the Coderre administration denied a request to open an Islamic community centre in the Mercier-Hochelaga-Maisonneuve neighbourhood of Montreal because its imam Hamza Chaoui, had allegedly preached that Canadians ought to change their legal system to sharia. Chaoui filed a lawsuit on July 9 for defamation against Coderre and the city of Montreal. Chaoui characterised Coderre's remarks as an attack on his dignity, honour and reputation. Réal Ménard, the borough mayor of Mercier-Hochelaga-Maisonneuve, supported Coderre's position.

In August 2015, Coderre took a jackhammer to a Canada Post community mailbox foundation in l'Anse-à-l'Orme Nature Park. He was dismissive of concerns that his action was illegal. The Province of Quebec's Crown prosecutors office confirmed that Coderre would not face charges for the media stunt.

From October 18, 2015, until October 25, 2015, Coderre authorized the dumping for 8 billion litres of untreated sewage into the Saint Lawrence River to facilitate repairs to Montreal's sewer system. The incident was widely criticized by Environment and Climate Change Canada, Infrastructure Canada, and a petition of over 55,000 signatures.

On January 21, 2016, Coderre, along with other officials of the Montreal Metropolitan Community (Communauté Métropolitaine de Montréal), formally opposed the Energy East pipeline project based on environmental concerns. His position was denounced by Conservative Party of Canada interim leader Rona Ambrose, Saskatchewan Party leader Brad Wall and Alberta Wildrose Party leader Brian Jean. In 2016, he announced the Réseau express métropolitain.

On September 27, 2016, Montreal passed a citywide pit bull ban. Coderre was an advocate for the bylaw, stating that "my duty as mayor of Montreal is making sure I am working for all Montrealers, and I am there to make sure they feel safe and that they are safe." The bylaw creates a citywide ban on new pit bull-type dogs from being owned and added restrictions on those currently in the city. The bylaw also places new restrictions on all dogs and cats within the city and its 19 boroughs. Animal protection groups such as the Montreal SPCA (Society for the Prevention of Cruelty to Animals) stated that if the new bylaw passed they would take legal action against the city.

On October 3, 2016, a Quebec judge temporarily suspended the pit bull ban part of the bylaw. Two days later the judge decided to extend the suspension on the grounds that the bylaw was too vague and imprecise, claiming that "this court has the impression that certain articles of the bylaw were written in haste." An appeal court overturned the decision and Coderre's pit bull ban was in effect in Montreal from December 1, 2016 to December 20, 2017, when the administration of new mayor Valérie Plante repealed it in favor of a new animal by-law that didn't target specific breeds. Opposition to Coderre's pit bull ban was an electoral issue during the 2017 Montreal municipal election.

Coderre's municipal government contributed $410 million for events and projects for Montreal's 375th anniversary, which took place in 2017. The figure of 410 million means $241 per person in Montreal (population 1.7 million). The total spending for the festivities exceeded $1 billion. The rest came from Quebec, Ottawa and private sources. For Montreal's contribution, the main achievements that remain include several sculptures in various parts of Montreal and some other beautification projects. In addition, the Société des célébrations du 375e anniversaire de Montréal, to which Montreal was a major contributor, paid $9.5 million out of the total price of $40 million for the controversial light project of the Jacques Cartier Bridge. Some have found that the costs of the celebrations have not been worth the benefits.

== Post-mayoral career ==
Coderre was an administrator of Eurostar from 2018 to 2021, as well as a special advisor for the FIA since 2019.

After much speculation, Coderre had announced his intention to run for mayor of Montreal in the 2021 Montreal municipal election. On April 7, 2021 he became leader of the municipal party Ensemble Montréal, which was formerly called Équipe Denis Coderre. On November 7, 2021, he was defeated once again by Valérie Plante. After the election loss, he announced once again that he would be retiring from politics.

In April 2023, Coderre suffered a mild stroke.

Coderre was a candidate in the 2025 Quebec Liberal Party leadership election. He was disqualified by the party's Electoral Committee on February 7, 2025. While no reason for the move was issued publicly, the action followed reports that Coderre owed more than $130,000 in provincial taxes and more than $266,000 to the Canada Revenue Agency.

In May 2025, Coderre endorsed Conservative Party of Quebec leader Éric Duhaime in his by-election bid in Arthabaska.

In July 2025, Coderre announced that he was "turning the page" on politics and took a role with Résidences Soleil.

In 2026 Coderre was named president of the Montréal Toundra of the Basketball Super League

== Honours ==

Ribbon	Description	Notes
	Queen Elizabeth II Golden Jubilee Medal for Canada	2002; As the Minister of Immigration and an elected Member of the House of Commons of Canada, the Honourable Denis Coderre would be awarded the medal as a member of the Canadian order of precedence.
	Queen Elizabeth II Diamond Jubilee Medal for Canada	2012; As a member of Her Majesty's Privy Council for Canada, the Honourable Denis Coderre was awarded the medal as a member of the Canadian order of precedence.

27th Canadian Ministry (2003–2006) – Cabinet of Paul Martin
Cabinet post (1)
Predecessor	Office	Successor
Stéphane Dion	President of the Queen's Privy Council for Canada; 2003–2004	Lucienne Robillard
Special Cabinet Responsibilities
Predecessor	Title	Successor
Denis Paradis	Minister responsible for La Francophonie; 2003–2004	Jacques Saada
Ralph Goodale	Federal Interlocutor for Métis and Non-Status Indians; 2003–2004	Andy Scott
26th Canadian Ministry (1993–2003) – Cabinet of Jean Chrétien
Cabinet post (1)
Predecessor	Office	Successor
Elinor Caplan	Minister of Citizenship and Immigration; 2002–2003	Judy Sgro
Sub-Cabinet Post
Predecessor	Title	Successor
	Secretary of State (Amateur Sport) (1999–2002)	
Party political offices
Preceded by Céline Hervieux-Payette	Quebec lieutenant for the Leader of the Liberal Party; 2009–2009	Succeeded by Marc Garneau
