= Valérie Plante =

Mayor of Montreal from 2017 to 2025

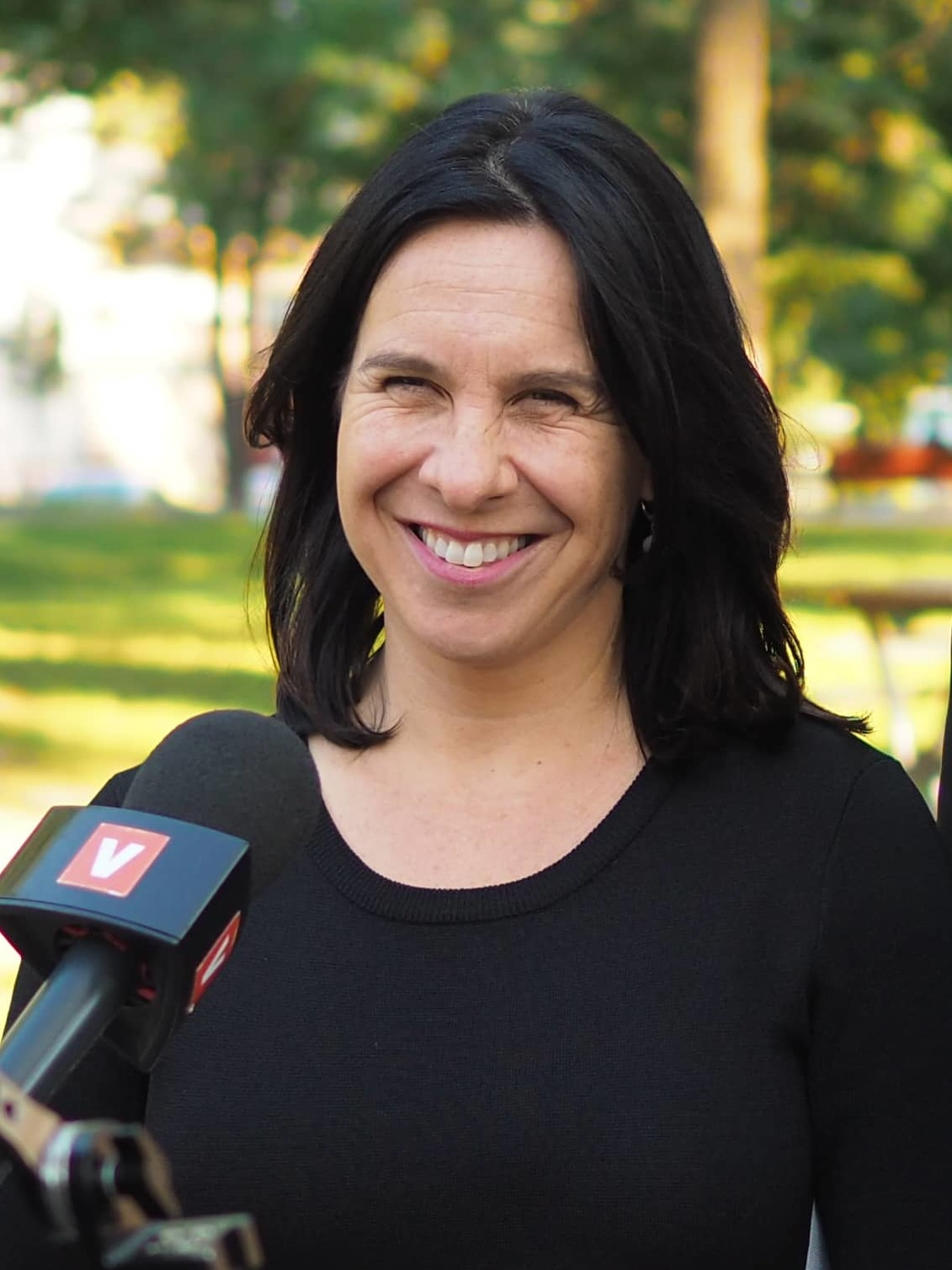
- Plante in September 2019

45th Mayor of Montreal
- In office 16 November 2017 – 13 November 2025
- Preceded by: Denis Coderre
- Succeeded by: Soraya Martinez Ferrada

Leader of Projet Montréal
- In office 4 December 2016 – 15 March 2025
- Preceded by: Luc Ferrandez
- Succeeded by: Luc Rabouin

Montreal City Councillor for Sainte-Marie
- In office 2013–2017
- Preceded by: Pierre Mainville
- Succeeded by: Sophie Mauzerolle

Personal details
- Born: 14 June 1974 (age 52) Rouyn-Noranda, Quebec, Canada
- Party: Projet Montréal
- Education: Université de Montréal

Valérie Plante (French pronunciation: [valeʁi plɑ̃t]; born 14 June 1974) is a Canadian politician and television personality who served as the 45th mayor of Montreal from 2017 to 2025. First elected to Montreal City Council in the 2013 election, she served as leader of the Projet Montréal party from December 2016 until March 2025.

Plante was Projet Montréal's candidate for mayor in the 2017 municipal election, and was elected Mayor of Montreal on 5 November 2017. She is the first woman to be elected mayor of Montreal, having been preceded only by councillor Jane Cowell-Poitras's two brief stints as acting mayor following mayoral resignations in the early 2010s and by the ceremonial appointment of Lise Payette as mayor of the city for one day to mark the International Women's Year in 1976.

== Early life and education ==
Plante was born in Rouyn-Noranda, Quebec, on 14 June 1974. She spent a year in North Bay, Ontario, as a teenager to learn English. In 1994, she moved to Montreal to attend university, receiving a degree in anthropology in 1997, and another in museology in 2001, both from the Université de Montréal. She then worked for a number of non-profit organizations, most notably as communications director of the Girls Action Foundation.

In the 1990s, she worked as a tour guide at Vimy Ridge in France.

== Political career ==
=== City councillor ===
In the 2013 Montreal municipal election, Plante was elected councillor for the Sainte-Marie district of the Ville-Marie borough, defeating former provincial minister and 2009 Montreal mayoral candidate Louise Harel. She was named opposition critic for downtown, tourism, and for women's affairs. She was also named vice-president of city council, as well as substitute mayor for Ville-Marie.

In the fall of 2016, Plante announced her run for the leadership of Projet Montréal. She went on to win the leadership election with 51.9%, defeating Guillaume Lavoie.

=== Mayor of Montreal ===
Valérie Plante was elected mayor of Montreal on 5 November 2017, becoming the first woman to lead the city in its 375-year history. Few had predicted that Plante would be able to take down the incumbent mayor, Denis Coderre, a former federal Liberal MP and cabinet minister, at the beginning of the campaign. Plante won over voters on a promise to improve public transit, alleviate traffic woes and make the city more family friendly. On election day, Plante won 51 percent of the vote, compared to 46 percent for Coderre. Projet Montréal also won a majority of seats on the city council.

One of Plante's key campaign planks in the 2017 municipal election was the creation of a "Pink line", a new Montreal Metro line to improve public transit service between downtown and on two axes to the boroughs of Montréal-Nord and Lachine. Plante claimed that her campaign posters were strategically placed in certain areas where she knew her ideas would easily be spread.

In 2019, The Crucifix that has hung in the Montreal council chamber since 1937 was taken down under Plante's mayorship. The decision taken by Plante's administration was not preceded by a public consultation, which was criticized by the leader of the opposition at City Hall, Lionel Perez, who spoke of an "irresponsible" decision that will "sow division".

Plante decisively won the 7 November 2021 against Coderre by a wider margin, taking 52 percent of the vote to his 37 percent. The majority of Projet Montréal on city council was also increased. Plante campaigned on adding 60,000 social housing units and continuing to focus on improving urban life.

According to Le Monde, her administration was particularly marked by her environmental policy, "creating the largest municipal park in the country and transforming a city where cars reigned supreme into one of the most bicycle-friendly cities in North America."

On 23 October 2024, Plante announced that she will not seek a third term in the 2025 election. She was succeeded by Soraya Martinez Ferrada of the Ensemble Montréal party.

== Personal life ==
Plante has two children. She is married to Pierre-Antoine Harvey, an economist with the Centrale des syndicats du Québec.

After serving as mayor, Plante began hosting a documentary program on TV5 Québec Canada called Ça brasse en ville.

== See also ==
- Place des Montréalaises
