= Projet Montréal =

Municipal political party in Montreal, Canada

Projet Montréal - Équipe Luc Rabouin
- Active municipal party
- Leader: Ericka Alneus (interim)
- President: Marie-Ève Veilleux
- Founded: May 28, 2004
- Headquarters: 1055 Boulevard René-Lévesque Est, Montreal, Quebec; H2L 4S5
- Student wing: Projet Montréal UdeM; Projet Montréal McGill
- Youth wing: Comité des Jeunes de Projet Montréal
- Ideology: New Urbanism; Environmentalism; Direct democracy; Social democracy; Localism; Internal factions: Quebec nationalism
- Political position: Centre-left
- Colours: Green and blue
- Seats on council: 25 / 65

Website
- projetmontreal.org/en/

Projet Montréal (officially Projet Montréal - Équipe Luc Rabouin) is a progressive, environmentalist municipal political party in Montreal, Quebec, Canada. Founded in 2004, it is led by Ericka Alneus and is the opposition party in the Montreal City Council.

== History ==
Projet Montréal was founded by environmental activists in 2004. Richard Bergeron was the party's first mayoral candidate. He was elected to the city council in 2005 and gathered 8.53% of the vote for mayor.

In the September 2006 by-election held in the district of Marie-Victorin, Projet Montréal candidate and former city councillor Kettly Beauregard won 31.7% of the vote, for a second-place finish.

In December 2007, candidate Jean-Claude Marsan took second place with 37.43% in a by-election to replace disgraced Outremont borough mayor Stephane Harbour. At the same time, there was a by-election in Outremont's Robert-Bourassa district to replace Marie Cinq-Mars, who chose to run for borough mayor. Candidate Denise Rochefort also placed second, with 35.13% of the vote.

In the 2009 Montreal municipal election, Bergeron led the party through steadily increasing polls to a strong third-place showing, winning thirteen seats on city and borough councils, including two borough mayors, and sweeping the Plateau-Mont-Royal.

In April 2012, Érika Duchesne won a by-election in the Vieux-Rosemont district of Rosemont-La Petite Patrie, giving Project Montréal its 11th seat on city council.

In the 2013 Montreal municipal election, Projet Montréal doubled its number of seats within city council, going from 10 to 20 and becoming the official opposition against Denis Coderre's team. After the election, Richard Bergeron stated that he would resign his party leadership within the next 12 or 24 months. He admitted that he was disappointed with the election results but that he would remain to make Projet Montréal into a true opposition to Coderre's administration.

In the 2017 Montreal municipal election, Projet Montréal had won a majority of seats in the city council as well as having its mayoral candidate Valérie Plante become the mayor of Montreal. The party won an increased majority in the 2021 Montreal municipal election. On 23 October 2024, Plante announced that she will not seek a third term in the 2025 municipal election. With Luc Rabouin at the party's helm, Projet Montréal returned to opposition, with Rabouin resigning as party leader on election night.

== Platform ==
Projet Montréal advocates sustainable urbanism, which is the application of the principles of sustainable development to an urban setting, such as downtown Montreal. One of the party's proposals consists of building light rail in order to do the following:

- reduce car traffic;
- give more room to pedestrians and cyclists;
- increase the residents' quality of life and
- reverse urban sprawl.

Projet Montréal's 2009 platform elaborates commitments for seven major aspects of urban living:

1. Renewal and expansion of participatory democracy
2. Affordable housing and reinforcing socio-urban tissue
3. Sustainable transport (public transit and active transit)
4. Environmental sustainability
5. Economic development
6. Culture
7. Accountability and public services

== Electoral results ==
=== Mayoral election ===
Election	Candidate	Votes	%	Status	Result
2005	Richard Bergeron	32,126	8.53	3rd	Lost
2009	Richard Bergeron	106,768	25.45	3rd	Lost
2013	Richard Bergeron	118,637	25.52	3rd	Lost
2017	Valérie Plante	243,594	51.42	1st	Elected
2021	Valérie Plante	217,986	52.14	1st	Elected
2025	Luc Rabouin	144,235	35.05	2nd	Lost

=== City council ===
Election	City council seats	+/–	Position	Result
2005	1 / 65	▲1	▲3rd	Third party
2009	10 / 65	▲9	3rd	Third party
2013	20 / 65	▲10	▲2nd	Opposition
2017	34 / 65	▲14	▲1st	Majority
2021	37 / 65	▲3	1st	Majority
2025	25 / 65	▼12	▼2nd	Opposition
