= Nouveau-Bordeaux =

- Area
- Location of Nouveau-Bordeaux in Montreal
- Coordinates: 45.546817°N 73.677017°W
- Country: Canada
- Province: Quebec
- City: Montreal
- Borough: Ahuntsic-Cartierville
- Postal Code: H3L, H3M, H4N
- Area codes: 514, 438

Nouveau-Bordeaux (French pronunciation: [nuvo bɔʁdo], lit. 'New Bordeaux') originally known as Bordeaux, is an area in north end Montreal, Quebec, Canada located in the borough of Ahuntsic-Cartierville.

The former municipality of the city of Bordeaux is bordered to the north by the Rivière des Prairies, to the northeast by the Ahuntsic district, to the southeast by the city of Saint-Laurent, and to the southwest by the Cartierville district. The old streets of the former village of Bordeaux expanded in the late 1950s to form a new residential area, Nouveau-Bordeaux—a suburb on the Island of Montreal, characterized by its bungalows and triplexes. Today, this area corresponds to part of Cartierville (notably served by the H3M postal code) as well as a portion of Ahuntsic (within the H4N postal code area, also shared with Saint-Laurent), illustrating the overlap between postal and administrative boundaries in this region.

The former Bordeaux railway station was once located here. The Bois-de-Boulogne station, a commuter rail station operated by Exo served on its Saint-Jérôme line, serves the neighbourhood. The Bordeaux Prison is located near here.
