= Ahuntsic (disambiguation) =

Ahuntsic is a district in Montreal, Quebec, Canada

Ahuntsic may also refer to:

== Places ==
- Ahuntsic-Cartierville, a borough of the city of Montreal
- Ahuntsic (federal electoral district)
- Ahuntsic (provincial electoral district)

== Transit ==
- Ahuntsic station (Exo), in Montreal, Quebec, Canada
- Ahuntsic station (Via Rail), a former station in Montreal, Quebec, Canada
- Viau Bridge, formerly known as Ahuntsic Bridge

== Other uses ==
- Ahuntsic (missionary) (died 1625), Huron Christian missionary
- Collège Ahuntsic
