= List of municipal electoral districts in Montreal =

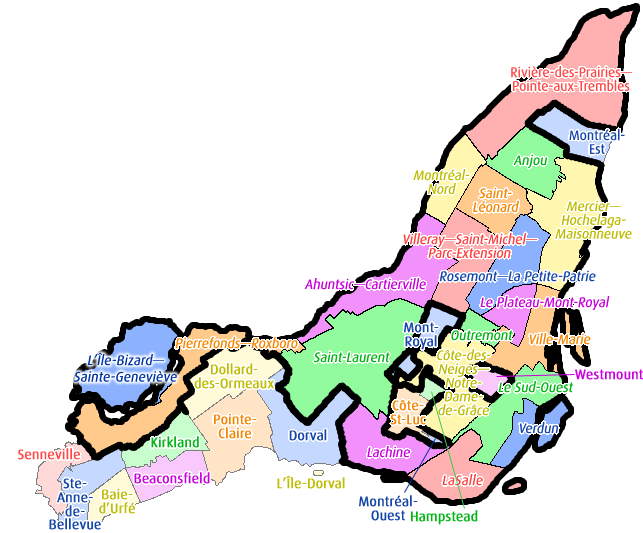

The following is a list of municipal electoral districts in Montreal. They were created for electoral purposes and are based on historical boundaries of neighborhoods and former towns or cities.

== Ahuntsic-Cartierville ==
- Ahuntsic
- Bordeaux-Cartierville
- Saint-Sulpice
- Sault-au-Récollet

== Anjou ==
- Anjou-Centre
- Anjou-Est
- Anjou-Ouest

== Côte-des-Neiges–Notre-Dame-de-Grâce ==
- Côte-des-Neiges
- Darlington
- Loyola
- Notre-Dame-de-Grâce
- Snowdon

== Lachine ==
- Canal
- Fort-Rolland
- J.-Émery-Provost

== LaSalle ==
- Cecil-P.-Newman
- Sault-Saint-Louis

== Le Plateau-Mont-Royal ==
- DeLorimier
- Jeanne-Mance
- Mile End

== Le Sud-Ouest ==
- Saint-Henri–Petite-Bourgogne–Pointe-Saint-Charles
- Saint-Paul-Émard

== L'Île-Bizard–Sainte-Geneviève ==
- Denis-Benjamin-Viger
- Jacques-Bizard
- Pierre-Foretier
- Sainte-Geneviève

== Mercier–Hochelaga-Maisonneuve ==
- Hochelaga
- Louis-Riel
- Maisonneuve-Longue-Pointe
- Tétreaultville

== Montréal-Nord ==
- Marie-Clarac
- Ovide-Clermont

== Outremont ==
- Claude-Ryan
- Jeanne-Sauvé
- Joseph-Beaubien
- Robert-Bourassa

== Pierrefonds-Roxboro ==
- Pierrefonds-Roxboro-Est
- Pierrefonds-Roxboro-Ouest

== Rivière-des-Prairies–Pointe-aux-Trembles ==
- La Pointe-aux-Prairies
- Pointe-aux-Trembles
- Rivière-des-Prairies

== Rosemont–La Petite-Patrie ==
- Étienne-Desmarteau
- Marie-Victorin
- Saint-Édouard
- Vieux-Rosemont

== Saint-Laurent ==
- Côte-de-Liesse
- Normand-McLaren

== Saint-Léonard ==
- Saint-Léonard-Est
- Saint-Léonard-Ouest

== Verdun ==
- Champlain–L’Île-des-Sœurs
- Desmarchais-Crawford

== Ville-Marie ==
- Peter-McGill
- Saint-Jacques
- Sainte-Marie

== Villeray–Saint-Michel–Parc-Extension ==
- François-Perrault
- Parc-Extension
- Saint-Michel (former Ville Saint-Michel)
- Villeray

== See also ==
- Boroughs of Montreal
- List of neighbourhoods in Montreal
- Montreal City Council
