= Ahuntsic =

- Neighbourhood
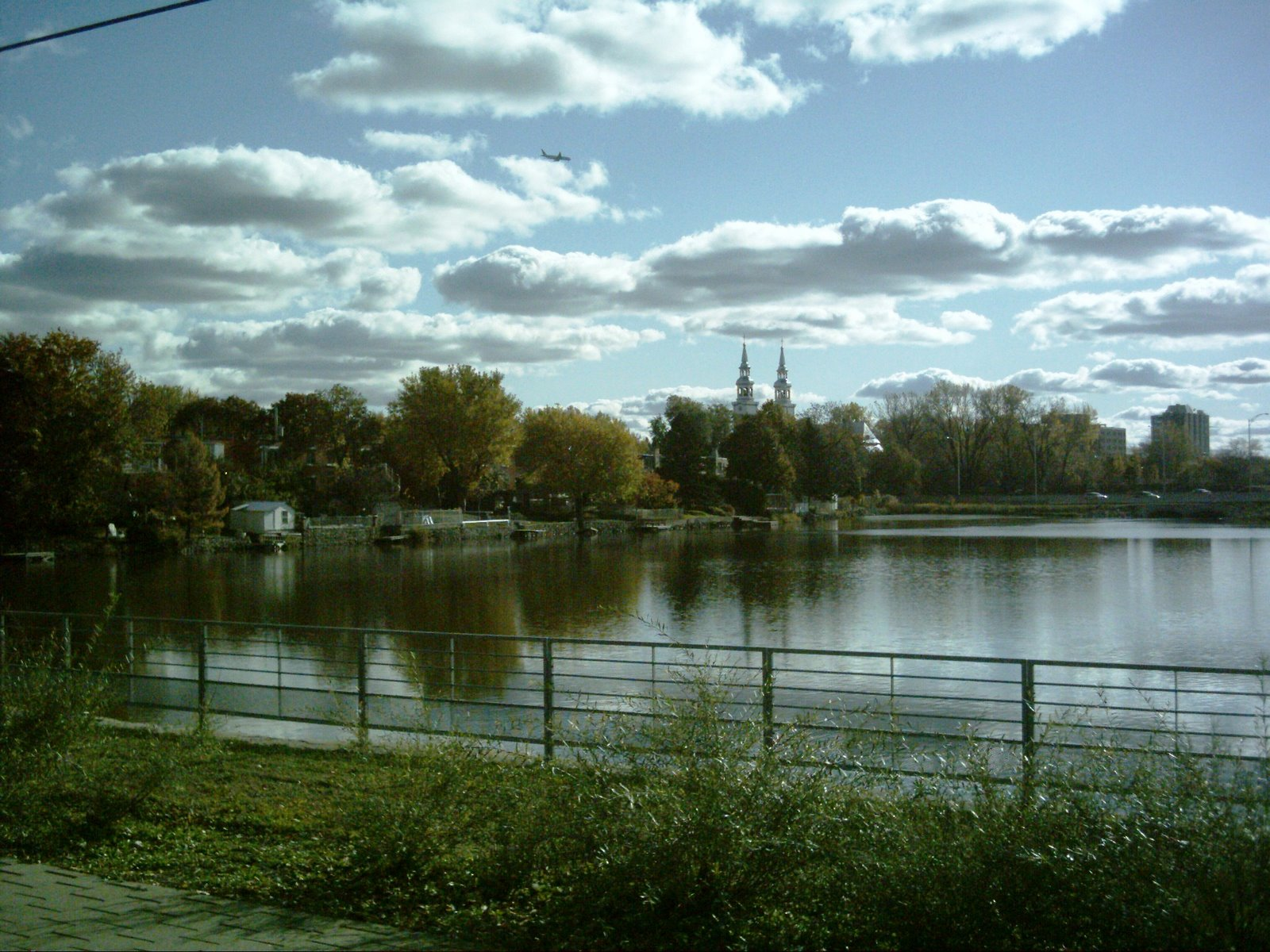

- Location of Ahuntsic in Montreal
- Coordinates: 45.554685°N 73.670985°W
- Country: Canada
- Province: Quebec
- City: Montreal
- Borough: Ahuntsic-Cartierville
- Established: 1910
- Postal Code: H2B, H2C, H2M, H2N, H3L
- Area codes: 514, 438

Ahuntsic (/əˈhʌntsɪk/; Canadian French pronunciation [aɔntsɪk], colloquially [ɔntsɪk]) is a district in the northern part of Montreal, Quebec, Canada. Originally an independent village, Ahuntsic was first annexed by Montreal in 1910, then merged into the borough of Ahuntsic-Cartierville in 2002.

It is home to Collège Ahuntsic and Complexe sportif Claude-Robillard. It is also known for being home to the oldest church on the island of Montreal, the Church of La Visitation-de-la-Bienheureuse-Vierge-Marie.

== Name ==
The district is named after a person of the same name, a man from the Wendat (Huron) nation, who was a student and associate of the French Recollet missionary to the Hurons, Nicolas Viel, in the 1620s in the colony of Quebec.

Viel was one of the first Catholic missionaries in the country of the Wendat, beginning in 1623. In May 1625, Viel decided to return to Quebec City in the company of a band of Wendat, including Ahuntsic, with the intention of making a few days' retreat and then returning to his missions. It is known that both Viel and Ahuntsic drowned in the rapids of the Rivière des Prairies, which from that time has borne the name of Sault-au-Récollet. The district of Ahuntsic is adjacent to the rapids.

== History ==
The municipality of the Village of Ahuntsic was founded on January 21, 1897, by a proclamation of the Quebec provincial government. The council of the new village operated until 1910, when the province passed laws creating the charter of the City of Montreal. It was then annexed and later combined with Nouveau-Bordeaux, forming the district of Ahuntsic-Bordeaux. The city of Cartierville and Sault-au-Récollet were added in 1918.

In 1952, following a land exchange, Ahuntsic took over part of Saint-Laurent. During the municipal merger-demerger under Bernard Landry administration, the Ahuntsic-Cartierville borough was created on January 1, 2002 together with the district of Cartierville.

== Education ==
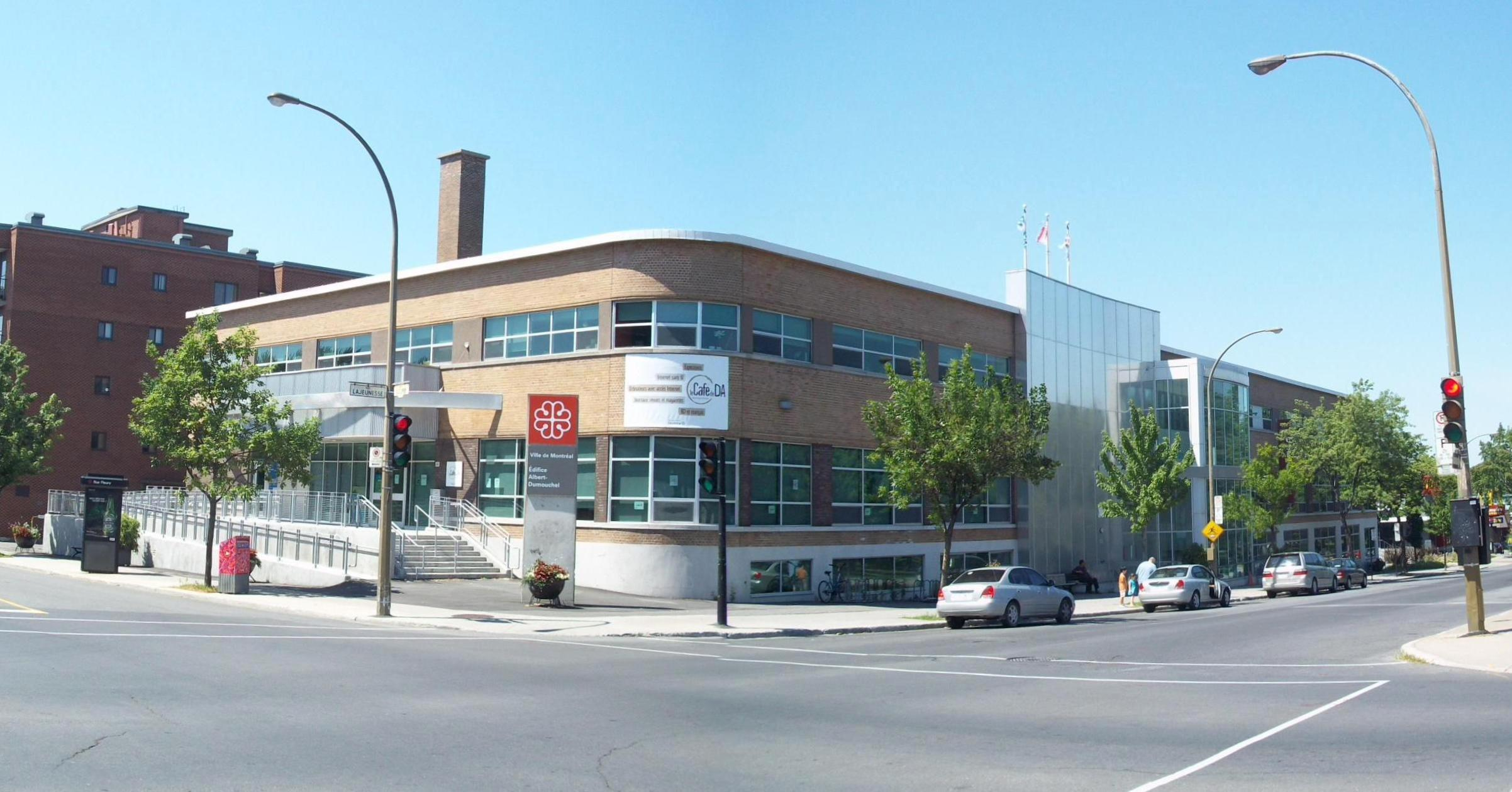
Édifice Albert-Dumouche, which houses the Ahuntsic library

The Collège Ahuntsic is a CEGEP in Ahuntsic.

The Centre de services scolaire de Montréal (CSSDM) operates French-language public schools in Ahuntsic.

- École primaire Ahuntsic

The English Montreal School Board (EMSB) operates English-language schools.

The Montreal Public Libraries Network operates the Ahuntsic library.

== Noted residents ==
- Mélanie Joly (b. 1979), MP for Ahuntsic-Cartierville, former Minister of Economic Development and Official Languages, current Canadian Minister of Foreign Affairs
- Julie Payette (b. 1963), former astronaut and 29th Governor General of Canada
- Maurice Richard (1921-2000), NHL player for the Montreal Canadiens

== 21st century ==
During the 21st century the population of Ahuntsic is increasing. Its central location on the Island of Montreal, its access to Metro and train stations, its proximity to Jean Talon Market and Little Italy, and its access to shopping areas like Rockland Center, Promenade Fleury (a grouping of 250 businesses and companies), and Marché Central (a large outdoor mall with many shops and restaurants), major Montreal highways and Laval all contribute to this increase.

The neighborhood is in close proximity to many parks, including L'Île-de-la-Visitation Nature Park and Ahuntsic Park.

Many students also live in this area, as it has access to the universities and to the Collège Ahuntsic, by both public transport and by its many bicycle lanes. This in turn, along with the new Université de Montréal campus in the neighboring Park Extension, and coupled with new construction, has caused gentrification to the area gradually and steadily since around 2010.

== Attractions ==
- Sault-au-Récollet
- Church of La Visitation-de-la-Bienheureuse-Vierge-Marie in Sault-au-Récollet
- L'Île-de-la-Visitation Nature Park
- Fleury Promenade [archive]
- Ahuntsic Park
- Chabanel District/Cité de la Mode
- Gouin Boulevard
- Marché Central Mall
- Rockland's centre Mall

== See also ==
- Village of Ahuntsic
- List of former municipalities in Quebec
- Garment District
