= Le Triangle =

- Neighbourhood
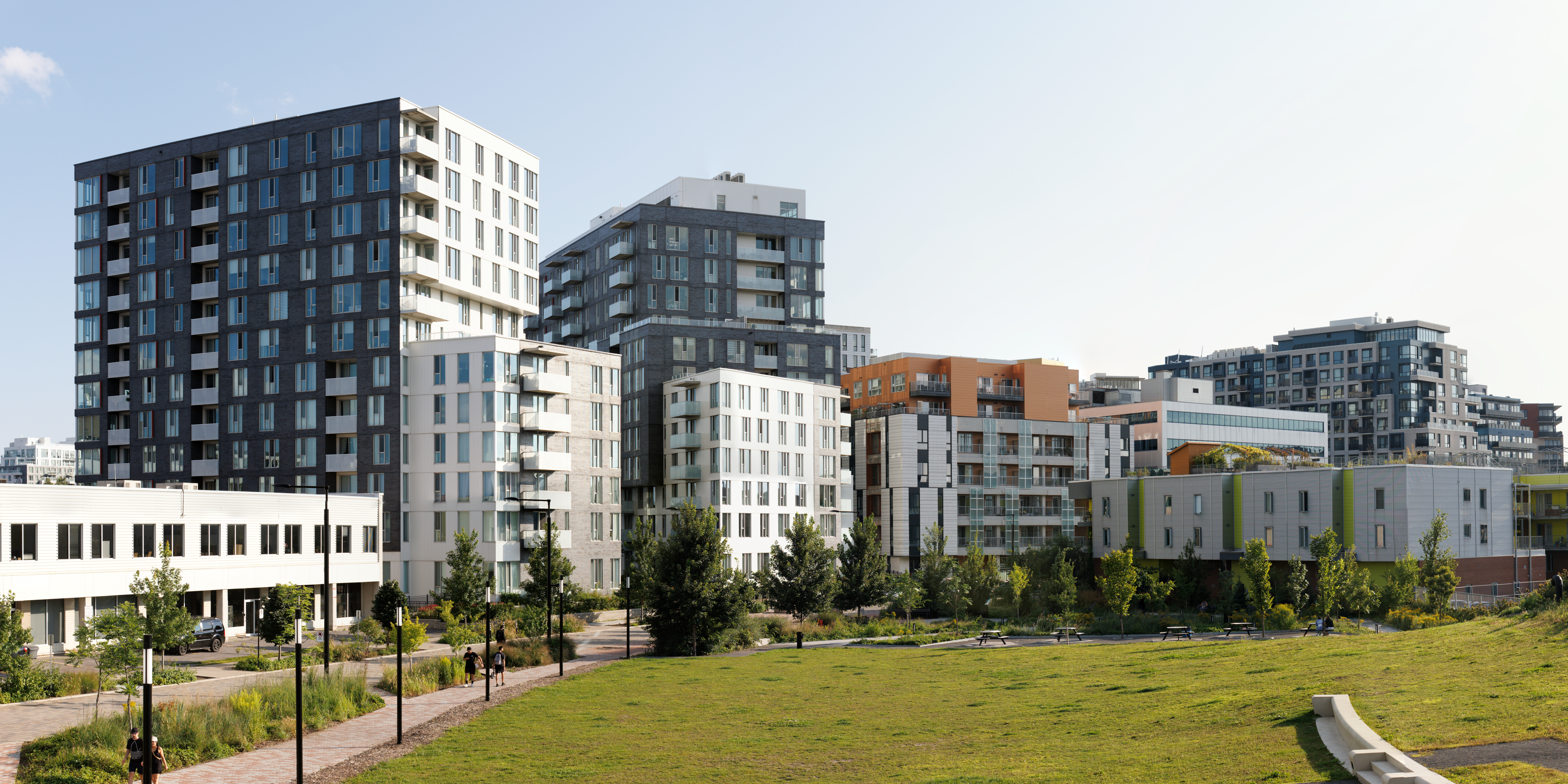
- Le Triangle in 2023

- Location of Le Triangle in Montreal
- Coordinates: 45.495864°N 73.651489°W
- Country: Canada
- Province: Quebec
- City: Montreal
- Borough: Côte-des-Neiges–Notre-Dame-de-Grâce
- Postal Code: H4P
- Area codes: 514, 438

Le Triangle (French pronunciation: [lə tʁijɑ̃ɡl]) is a redeveloped condominium district in Côte-des-Neiges–Notre-Dame-de-Grâce borough of Montreal, Quebec, Canada. Bounded by De la Savane, Mountain Sights and Jean Talon Street, the district was expected to be home to 1,200 residential units by the end of 2012, with a target of 4,200 units in total. 75% of the land is planned to be set aside for urban open space. As of March 2012, discussions were under way with the Commission scolaire de Montréal for the construction of an elementary school.

In September 2011, city councillor Helen Fotopulos stated that private investment in the district would total more than $900 million.

In 2016, the city and borough announced purchase of land in the area for a park—though half of the size of what had been originally planned.

In 2017, the city announced that streets bordering the district would be redesigned in keeping with the area's new residential character.
