= Philippe Liébert =

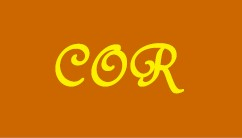
- Congress Own Regiment
- Born: August 9, 1733; Nemours, Île-de-France
- Died: September 23, 1804 (aged 71); Montréal, Canada
- Military career
- Branch: Army
- Service years: Continental Army: 1775–1783
- Rank: Captain; Major for pension
- Unit: Congress Own Regiment
- Conflicts: Seven Years' War: Battle of Quebec; American Revolutionary War: Battle of Quebec (1775); Battle of Saint-Pierre; Battle of Yorktown

Philippe Liébert (August 9, 1733 – September 23, 1804) was a French Canadian soldier who fought on the U.S. side of the American Revolutionary War, serving in Moses Hazen's 2nd Canadian Regiment of the Continental Army.

Philippe Liébert was born in Nemours, France, in the old-regime province of Île-de-France. He was a soldier of Montcalm in the Berry regiment.

He served with Clément Gosselin in Quebec for 23 years, from 1754 until 1777.

Before and after the war, he was a talented sculptor in Quebec, known in particular for the decoration of the Church of La Visitation-de-la-Bienheureuse-Vierge-Marie, the oldest extant church in Montreal. A road is named after him in the eastern part of Montreal.
