= Church of La Visitation-de-la-Bienheureuse-Vierge-Marie =

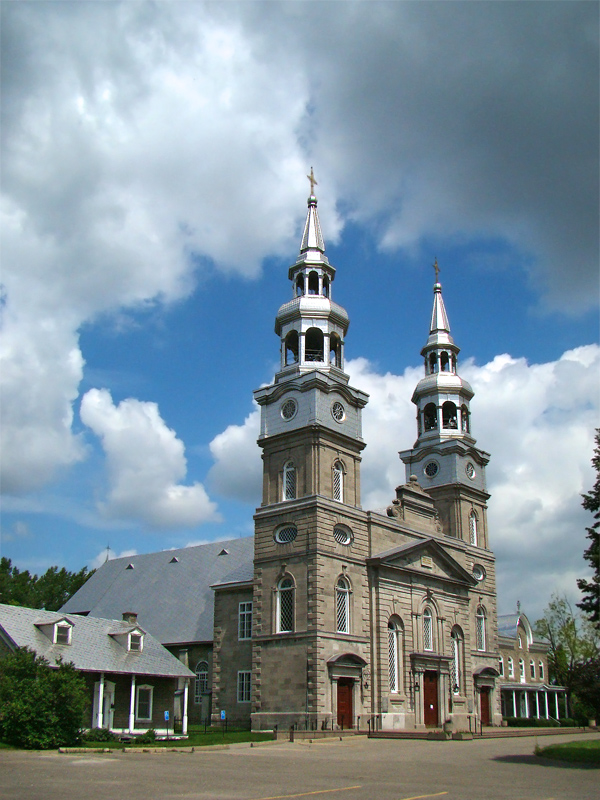
- Church of La Visitation-de-la-Bienheureuse-Vierge-Marie
- 45°34′14″N 73°39′41″W
- Location: 1847, Gouin Boulevard East, Montreal
- Country: Canada
- Denomination: Roman Catholic

History
- Status: Church
- Founder: Guillaume Chambon
- Dedication: Virgin Mary
- Consecrated: 1752 by Henri-Marie Dubreil de Pontbriand

Architecture
- Functional status: Active
- Architect: Philippe Liébert
- Architectural type: Church
- Groundbreaking: 1749
- Completed: 1752

Specifications
- Materials: Fieldstone

L'Église de la Visitation de la Bienheureuse-Vierge-Marie (English: Church of the Visitation of the Blessed Virgin Mary) is a church in the neighbourhood of Recollet Falls in Montreal. The oldest church on the island of Montreal, it was built between 1749 and 1752.

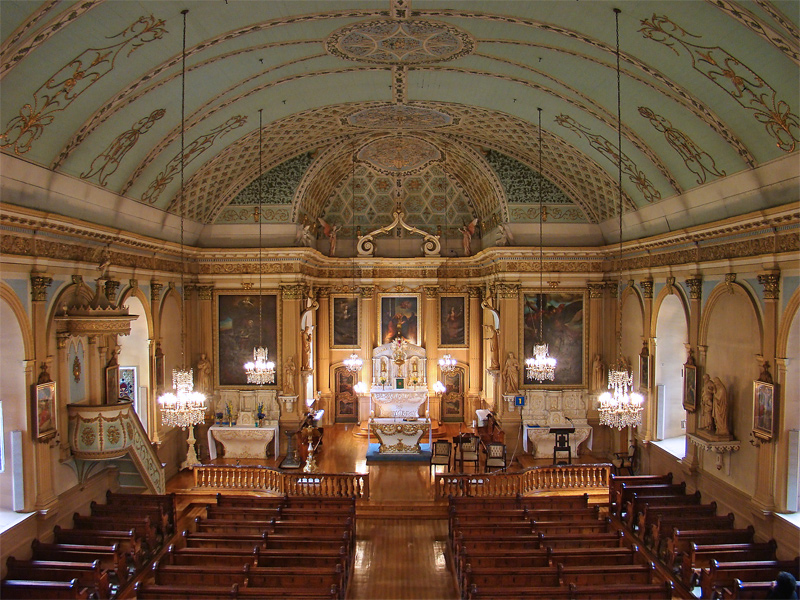
The interior

== Gallery ==
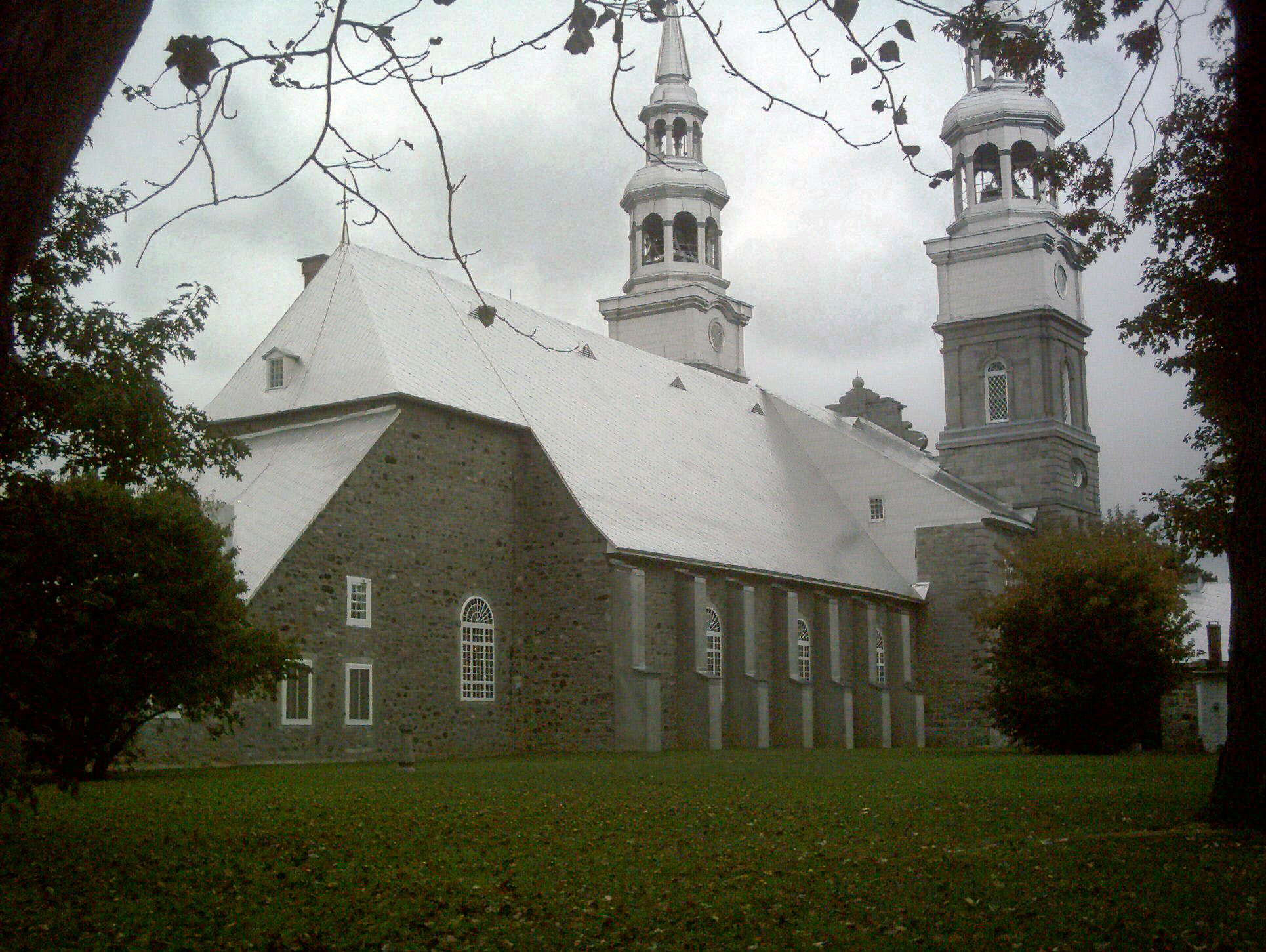

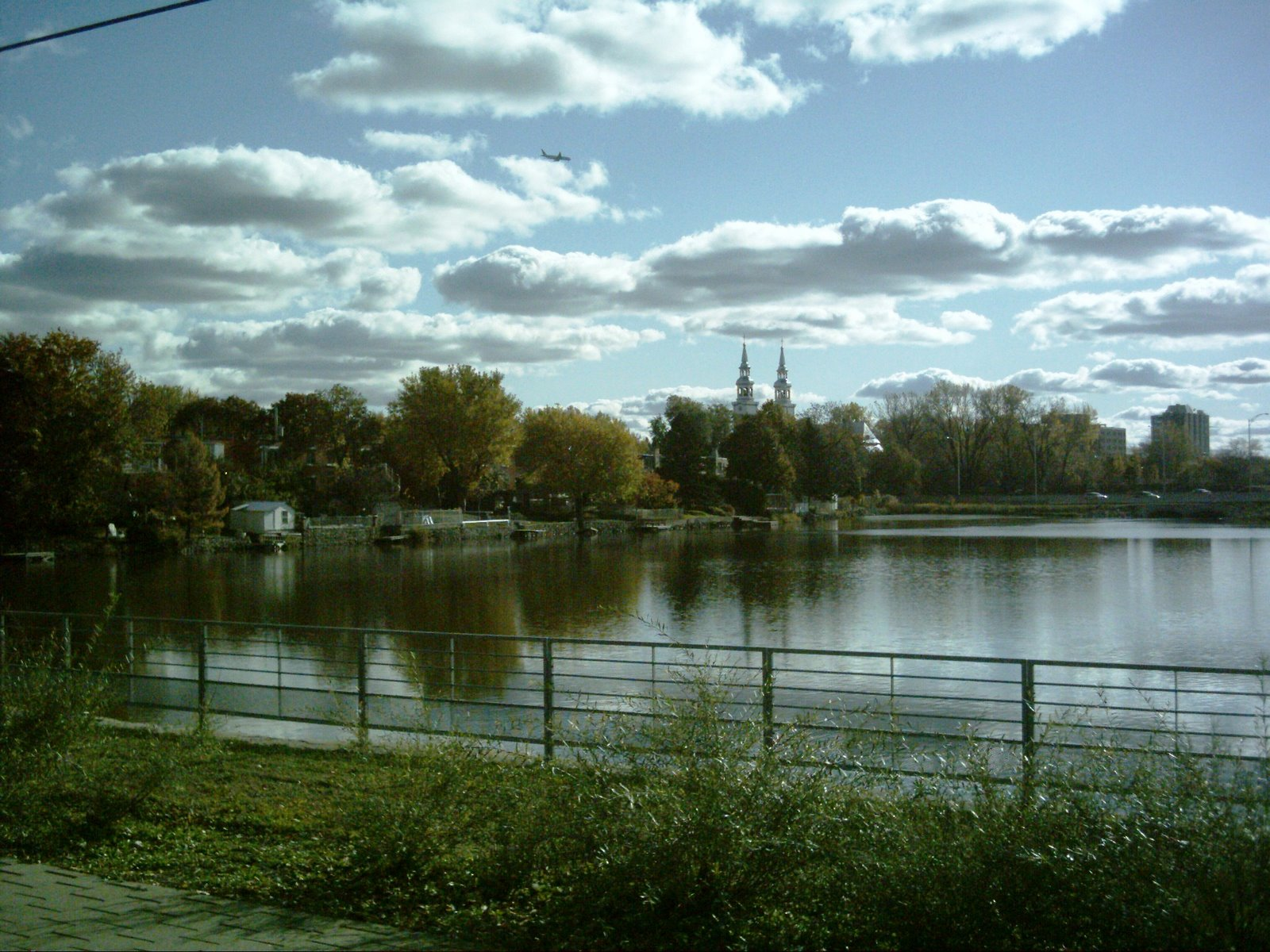

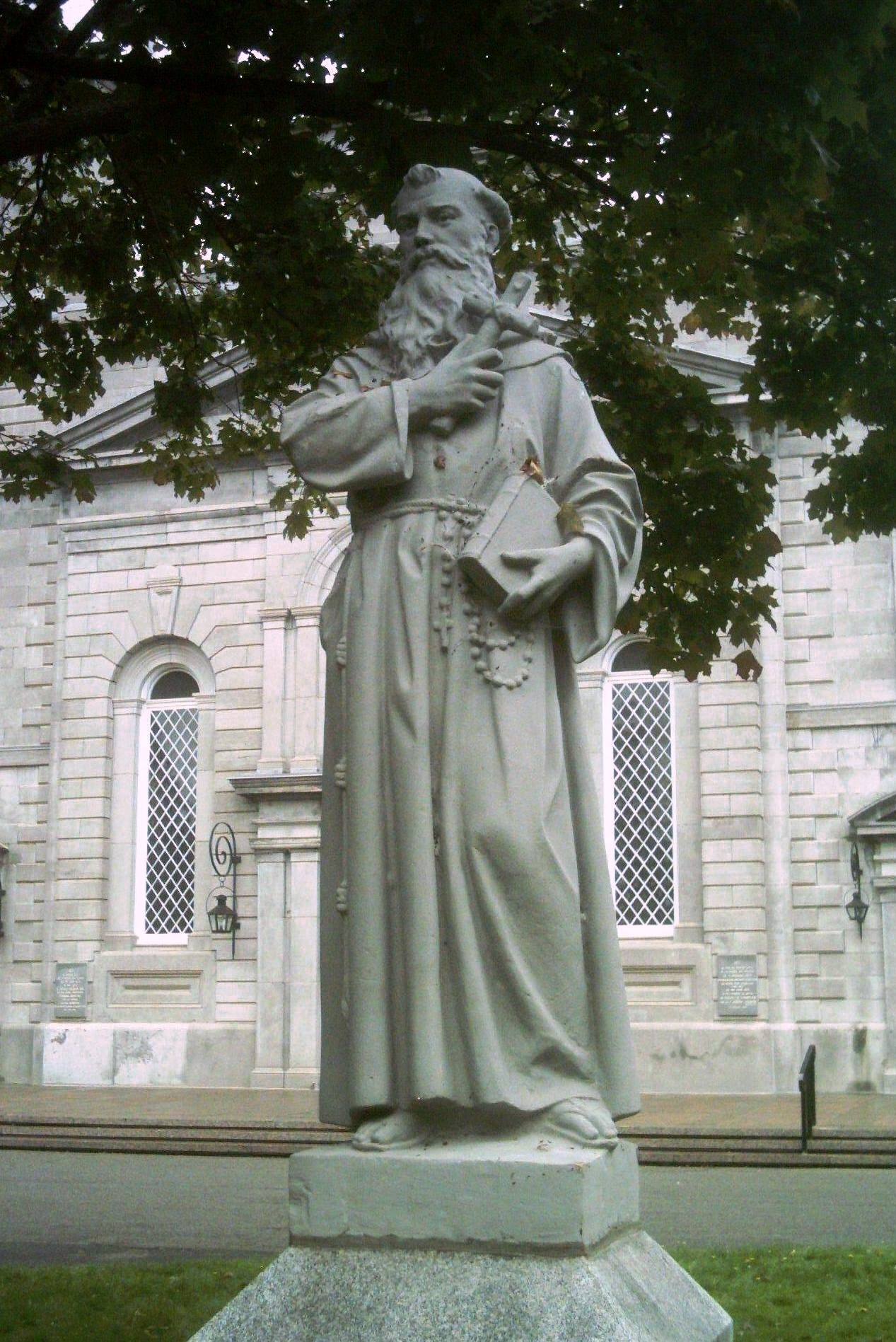
Nicolas Viel

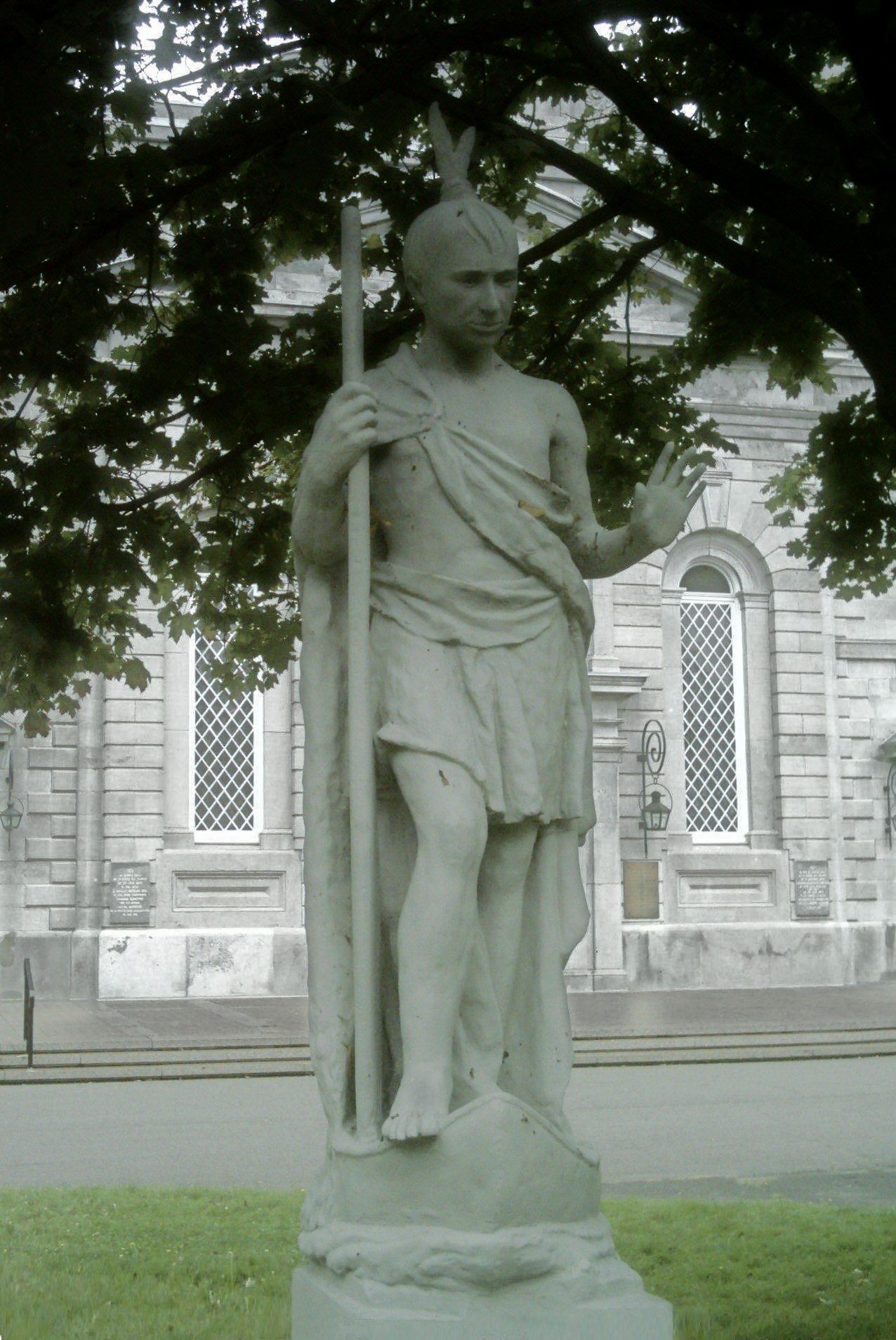
Ahuntsic
