= Ahuntsic (missionary) =

Wendat converted by French missionary

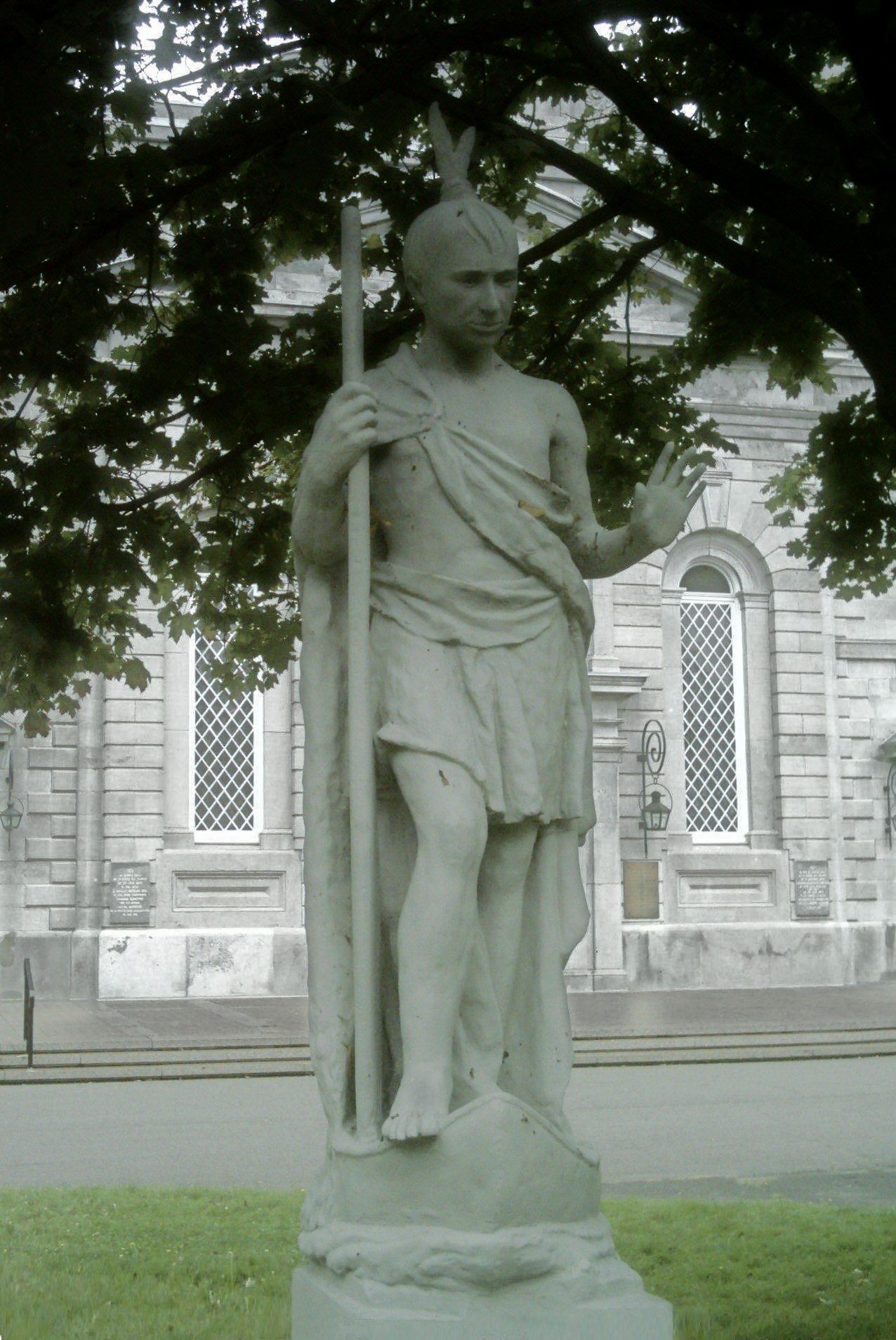
- Ahuntsic and Visitation Church in background
- Born: unknown
- Died: June 25, 1625; Sault-au-Récollet
- Cause of death: drowning, possibly assassination
- Occupation: Missionary
- Known for: His death

Ahuntsic (died June 25, 1625) was a possibly Wendat (Huron) (indigenous Canadian) man who was an understudy and associate of the French Recollet missionary to the Wendat, Nicolas Viel, in the 1620s in the colony of Quebec.

As they were accompanied by three Wendat people, both were famously drowned together in the last chute of the Riviere des Prairies, which now bears the name of Sault-au-Récollet during a trip to Quebec from Huron territory.

Consensus is lacking among historians with regard to what the actual events surrounding this event. The portrayal of Ahuntsic and Viel as martyrs in popular culture is objected to by those researchers who reject the notion that they were murdered. The ethnic identity and the actual phonetic name of the missionary referred to as Ahuntsic are also not universally agreed upon by authors.

The deaths of Ahuntsic and the Recollet Father Nicholas Viel in a single event have been commemorated as martyrs with a statue at the Church of La Visitation-de-la-Bienheureuse-Vierge-Marie, a painting by Georges Delfosse housed at the Cathedral-Basilica of Mary in Montreal, and a cross memorial erected at Parc de lÎle-de-la-Visitation. According to the Martyrologe des Recollets, he was attacked and drowned for his faith and work as a missionary, along with father Viel who is publicly regarded as the first Canadian martyr, by three Wendat Indians who were enemies of Christianity.

== Early life ==
Except for the intent of accompanying Viel on his trip to Quebec, records of the early life of Ahuntsic or his missionary work prior to the drowning event are not found. Notably and with regard to references from that incident, there is some debate surrounding the pronunciation and associated phonetic spelling of his name as well as his ethnic identity from the limited mention of his existence in historical accounts.

There are at least three different pronunciations, and consequently three different phonetic spellings, used by historical authors for the name for the chronicled neophyte missionary Ahuntsic, although the etymology and meaning for all three are the same as they are basically variations of understanding for the same Wendat expression. Several historians alternately refer in writing to the missionary Ahuntsic as “Auhaitsique,” which is translated as ‘little fish’, as the actual name or at least an alternative synonymous with Ahunstic. Father Le Clercq who was an associate of Viel, however, used Auhaustic as the written form of the name and Father Arthur Edward Jones, who in his 1909 book Old Huronia, maintained that the popular Ahuntsic pronunciation did not exist in the Wendat language and that it is rather a degeneration of the correct sounding term intended to mean ‘little fish’ from the Wendat dialect.

The ethnic identity of Ahuntsic as a Wendat converted to Christianity by Father Viel has also been contested by some historians who counter that Ahuntsic was actually a young French assistant who was given a Wendat name. This opinion was based on an account written by Brother Sagard who was sent to Canada with Viel. Those who argue that Ahuntsic has a Native American heritage also use Sagard’s history but with a different interpretation. Many of those arguing for a French Ahuntsic also reject the claim that Ahuntsic and Viel were assassinated.

At least one novel entitled The Conquest of Canada: A Novel of Discovery written by Wendel Messer depicts 17th century dialogue with a native named Ahuntsic, though the book is admittedly a blend of history and fiction according to the foreword.

== Death ==
There is wide concurrence with the description of Father Viel returning to Quebec on that fateful trip after two years in Wendat territory without the men who accompanied him there following the earlier departure of Father Le Caron and Brother Sagard. There is also not much disagreement that Father Viel and Ahunstic had been separated from the other canoes in the expedition and nearly all historians believe that they were traveling in the same canoe. On the other hand, considerable disagreement persists even with contemporary writers as to whether Ahuntsic and Viel simply drowned in a capsized canoe on the rapids or they were killed by the three accompanying Wendat natives who survived.

With a 1966 posting in the Dictionary of Canadian Biography, professor of History G.-M. Dumas writes that the written accounts of Father Le Jeune, Father Le Clercq, Father Bre’beuf, and brother Sagard are sufficient evidence to conclude that the deaths of Ahuntsic and Viel were deliberate. Ironically, it is also Dumas who points out that Ahuntsic was in another canoe close by and that Father Le Clercq erroneously changes the ethnic identity of the neophyte missionary from French to Wendat in a separate Biography posting for Le Clercq.

Conversely, ethnohistorian Bruce G. Trigger presents evidence designed to cast doubt on the claim of assassination in his 1998 book Children of Aataentsic: A History of the Huron People to 1660. Among that rationale is the severe rapids of the river, discrepancies in second-hand translations from surviving Wendat, and the forensic logic of historians Archange Godbout in 1942 and Marcel Trudel in 1966.

== Legacy ==
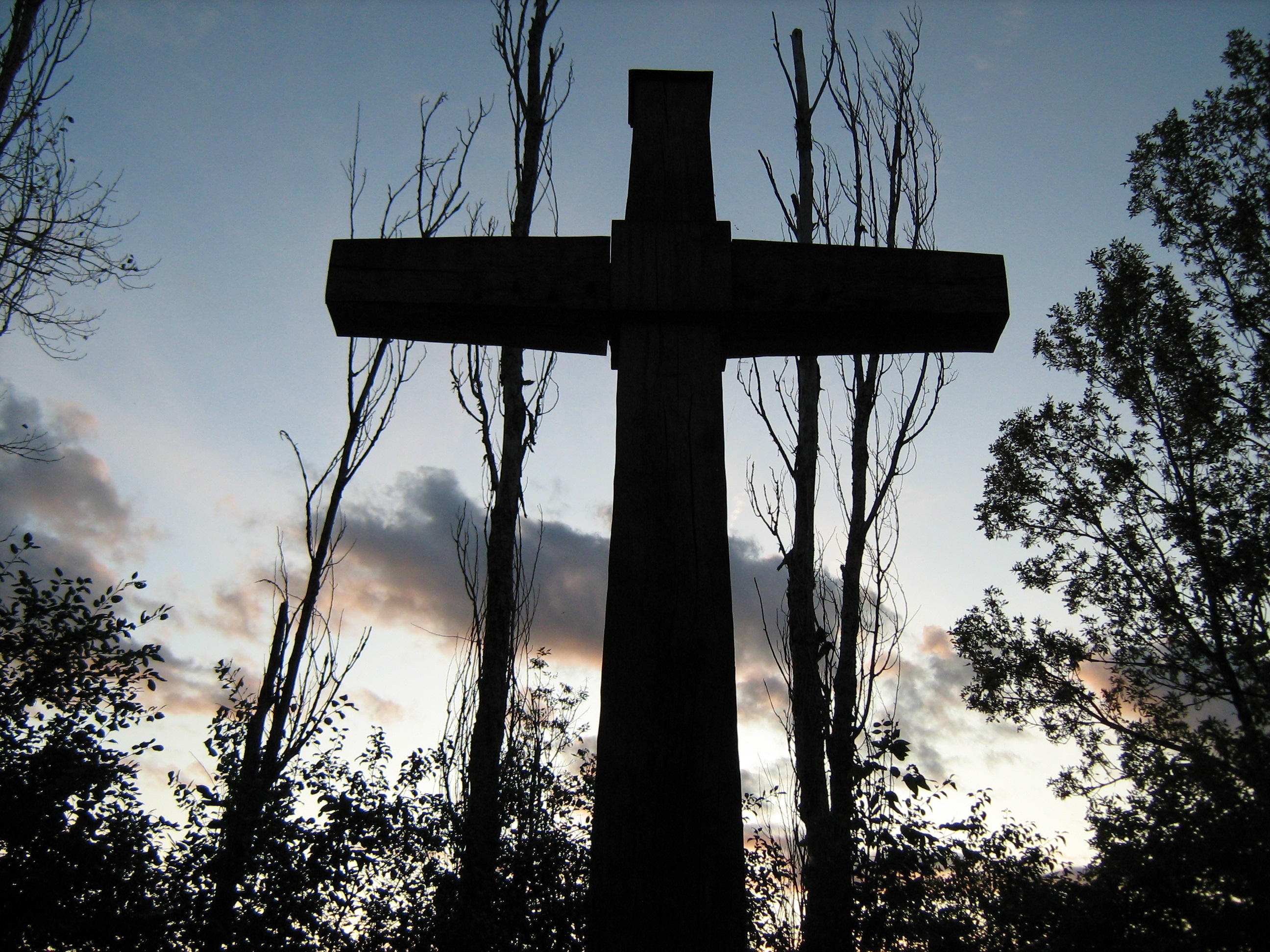
Cross in honour of Nicolas Viel and Ahuntsic at Parc de l'Île de la Visitation

In addition to the widespread veneration as a martyr in the aforementioned monuments, catholic literature, and archives, the Montreal district of Ahuntsic and the borough of Ahuntsic-Cartierville are named in honor of the famous neophyte missionary. As one of possibly many instances of a ripple effect, a college within the district of Ahuntsic also bears the name.
