= List of neighbourhoods in Montreal =

Map of the Montreal neighbourhoods

This is the list of the neighbourhoods in the city of Montreal, Quebec, Canada. They are sorted by the borough they are located in.

== Ahuntsic-Cartierville ==
- Ahuntsic
- Nouveau-Bordeaux
- Cartierville
- Saint-Sulpice
- Sault-au-Récollet (Île de la Visitation)

== Anjou ==
- Bas-Anjou: The Southeastern older portion, where the main services are located (town Hall, main library, fire station, high school)
- Haut-Anjou: The L-shaped part consisting of every street North of Autoroute 40 and every street West of Autoroute 25

== Côte-des-Neiges–Notre-Dame-de-Grâce ==
- Côte-des-Neiges
- Notre-Dame-de-Grâce
  - Benny Farm
- Snowdon
- Le Triangle
- Monkland Village
- Glenmount

== Lachine ==
- Ville Saint-Pierre

== LaSalle ==
No particular neighbourhoods.

Cecil-P.-Newman

Sault-Saint-Louis

== Le Plateau-Mont-Royal ==
=== The Plateau ===
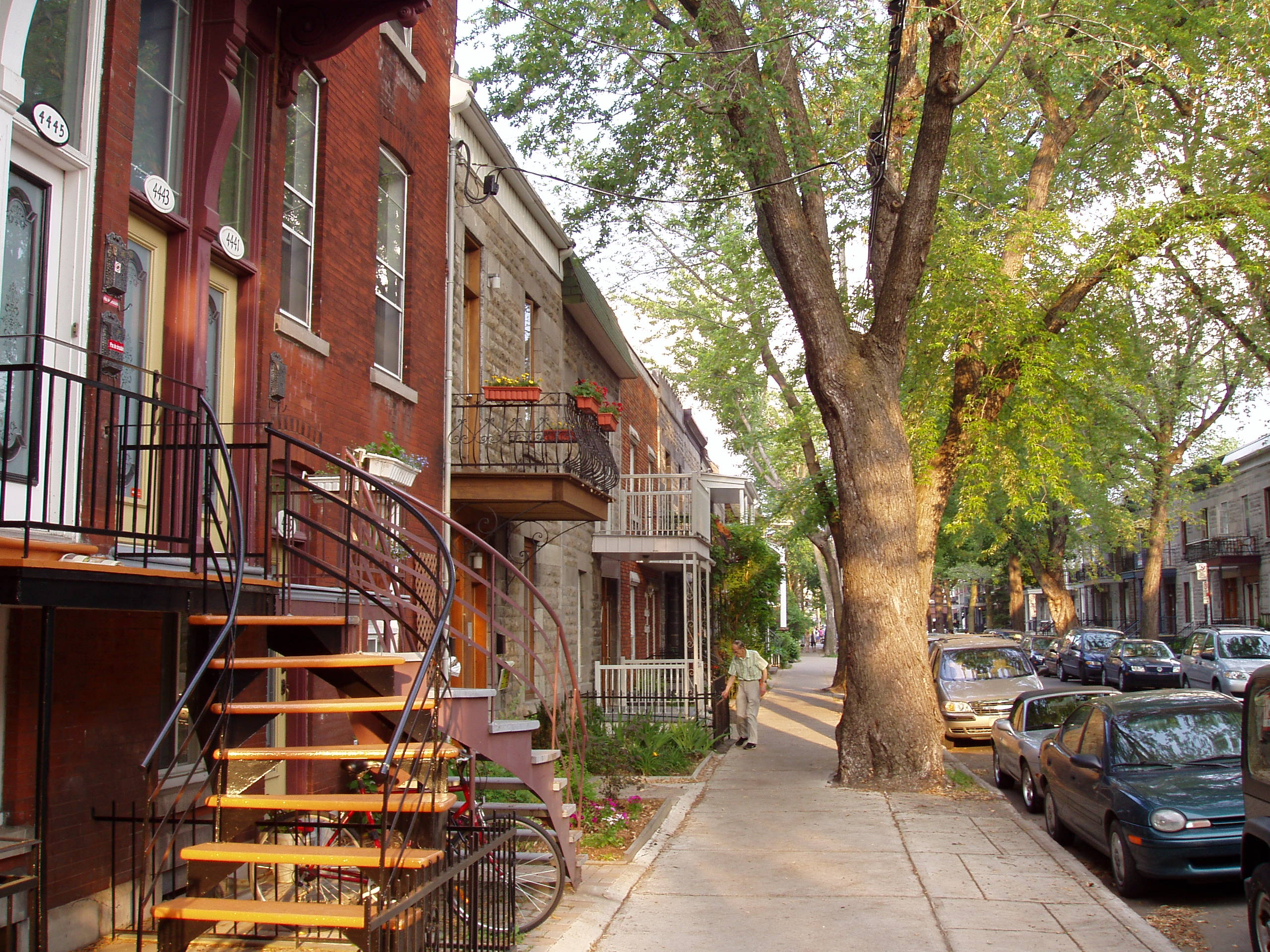
Typical residential street in Plateau-Mont-Royal, June 2005

Montreal's trendy and colourful Plateau Mont Royal neighbourhood is located on the twin North-South axes of Saint Laurent Boulevard and Saint Denis Street, and East-West axes of Mount Royal Avenue and Sherbrooke Street. The granite-paved, pedestrian-only Prince Arthur Street is also located in this neighbourhood. In the summer, nightlife often seems as active as in the day in this area.

The Plateau boasts the highest population density of all Montreal and the greatest number of creative people in Canada, according to Statistics Canada. The same source also states that it is the urban place where the most people travel mainly by foot, bicycle or public transport. In 1997, Utne Reader magazine included the Plateau Mont-Royal in its list of "15 Hippest places to live." The exterior staircase is a distinctive feature of the city's architecture.

=== Mile End ===
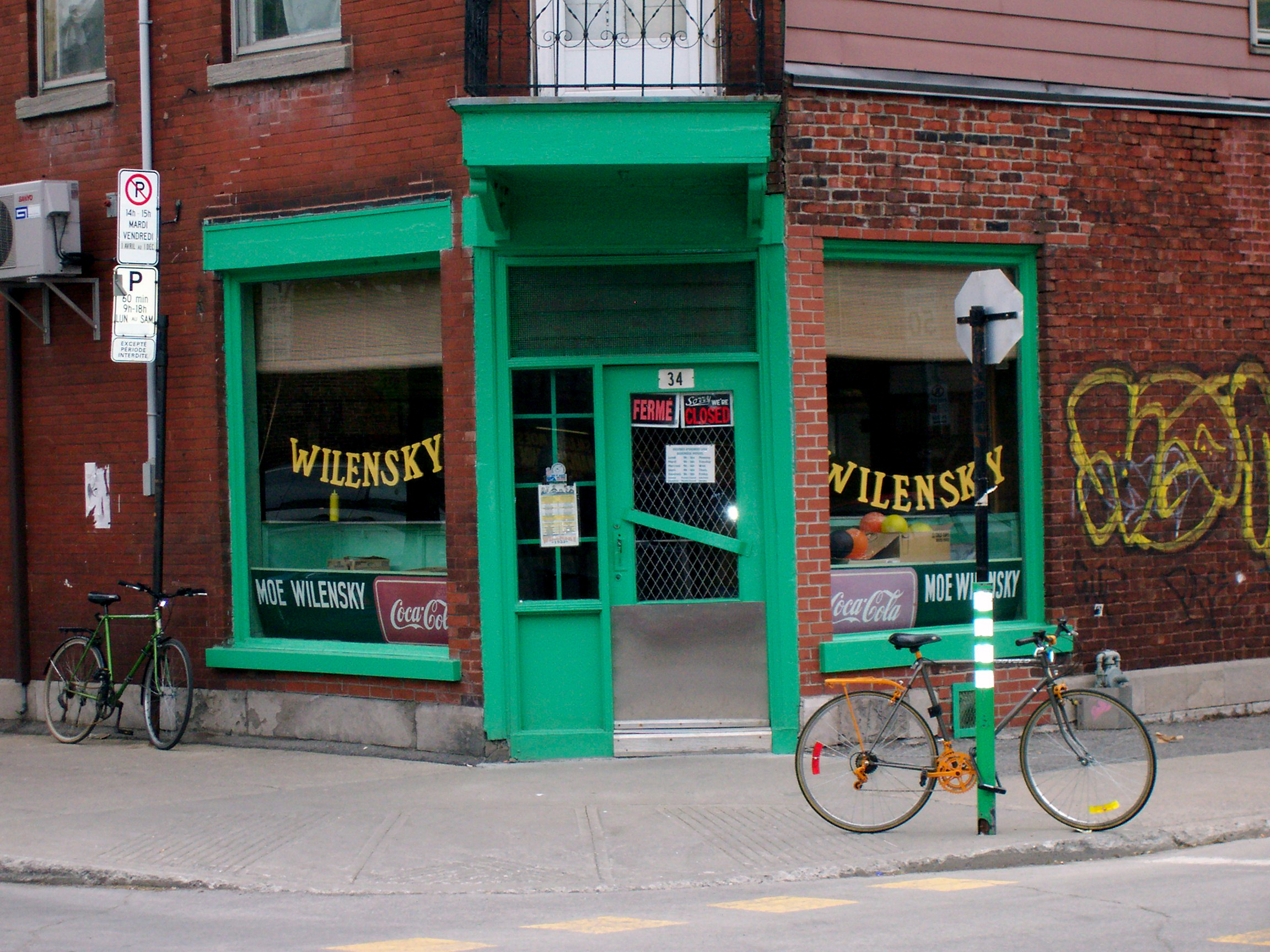
Wilensky's, closed weekends, May 2007

The tiny "Mile End" district, officially part of the Plateau borough but generally considered distinct, is home to many Montreal artists and filmmakers. The city's two famous bagel emporia, Fairmount Bagel and St. Viateur Bagel, are located on their respective streets. Fairmount Avenue is also home to Wilensky's, immortalized in the Mordecai Richler novel The Apprenticeship of Duddy Kravitz.

=== Little Portugal ===
Montreal has a modest Portuguese population, some of which is concentrated in Little Portugal, which is at the corner of Saint-Laurent Boulevard and Rachel street. Portuguese businesses can be found along several blocks of Saint-Laurent between Pine and Marie-Anne. The Portuguese area has largely absorbed what used to be the traditional Jewish neighbourhood.

=== Other neighbourhoods ===
- Milton-Parc (Often referred to by students of McGill University as "The McGhetto" or "The Ghetto", to the offense of other residents.)
- DeLorimier
- Jeanne-Mance
- Le Petit Laurier

== Le Sud-Ouest ==
=== Griffintown and Goose Village ===
District directly southwest of downtown Montreal and west of the old harbour. In the 19th century Griffintown and adjacent Goose Village were home to thousands of Irish immigrants (mostly Catholics), many of whom worked for the railway and on massive local projects such as the Victoria Bridge, or in the Northern Electric building, now Le Nordelec, just across the bridge in Point St. Charles.

Griffintown became a multi-ethnic neighbourhood by the turn of the twentieth century, with French-Canadians, Anglo-Protestants and, later, Italians and others, but keeping a majority of Irish Catholics. The Irish community claims the neighbourhood as a lieu du mémoire because of its significance as one of the earliest sites of Irish immigration in North America.

Many of the immigrants who arrived on "fever ships" or "coffin ships" during the diaspora sparked by the Great Famine of Ireland suffered from typhoid or other diseases and were quarantined in hastily constructed wooden "fever sheds" at Grosse-Île outside Quebec City and in Griffintown and Goose Village. Roughly six thousand Irish immigrants died in fever sheds at nearby Windmill Point during the typhus epidemic of 1847. They are commemorated by a black rock near the Victoria Bridge.

The collapse of heavy industry following World War II and the later closure of the Lachine Canal created poor economic conditions, and for several decades Griffintown was a low-income neighbourhood featuring small industries and offices and sporadic remaining residential buildings. In recent years it has undergone a massive change, with major condo projects spring up, some obliterating the old street grid. The old urban geography is vanishing in Griffintown by the day.

=== Pointe-Saint-Charles ===
An area located in the South-West borough, south of downtown between the Lachine Canal and the St. Lawrence River. Often referred to as 'The Point', it was originally a mainly English-speaking Irish working-class neighbourhood developed around factories and other Victorian-era industry. Changes in economic fortune in the mid-20th century led Point St. Charles into a decline that has only recently begun to change as a wave of gentrification has given the area new life. The neighbourhood has a documented reputation as one of the poorest in Montreal, and one of the roughest in Canada. Its inhabitants have been the subject of several National Film Board of Canada documentaries. Playwright David Fennario hails from the district.

- Montreal Technoparc

=== Other neighbourhoods ===
- Saint-Henri
- Little Burgundy
- Côte-Saint-Paul
- Ville-Émard

== L'Île-Bizard–Sainte-Geneviève ==
- Jacques-Bizard
- Sainte-Geneviève

== Mercier–Hochelaga-Maisonneuve ==
- Hochelaga-Maisonneuve
- Mercier, Montreal
  - Mercier-Ouest (Longue-Pointe)
  - Mercier-Est (Tétreaultville)
- Viauville

== Montréal-Nord ==
- No particular neighbourhoods.

Marie-Clarac

Ovide-Clermont

== Outremont ==
- No particular neighbourhoods.

Claude-Ryan

Jeanne-Sauvé

Joseph-Beaubien

Robert-Bourassa

== Pierrefonds-Roxboro ==
- Pierrefonds
- Roxboro

== Rivière-des-Prairies–Pointe-aux-Trembles ==
- Pointe-aux-Trembles
- Rivière-des-Prairies

== Rosemont–La Petite-Patrie ==
=== Little Italy ===
World Cup in Little Italy.

Montreal has the second largest Italian population in Canada after Toronto. There are around 250,000 Montrealers of Italian ancestry living within its Metropolitan Area. Montreal's Little Italy, located on St. Lawrence Boulevard between Jean-Talon and St. Zotique, is home to Montreal's original Italian Canadian community. Although many Italians in Montreal have since moved to other parts of town, Montreal's Little Italy has not lost its heritage, as it is home to a large collection of Italian restaurants, bars, and shops.

=== Other neighbourhoods ===
- La Petite-Patrie
- Rosemont
- Angus Shops

== Saint-Laurent ==
- Bois-Franc

== Saint-Léonard ==
=== Città Italiana ===
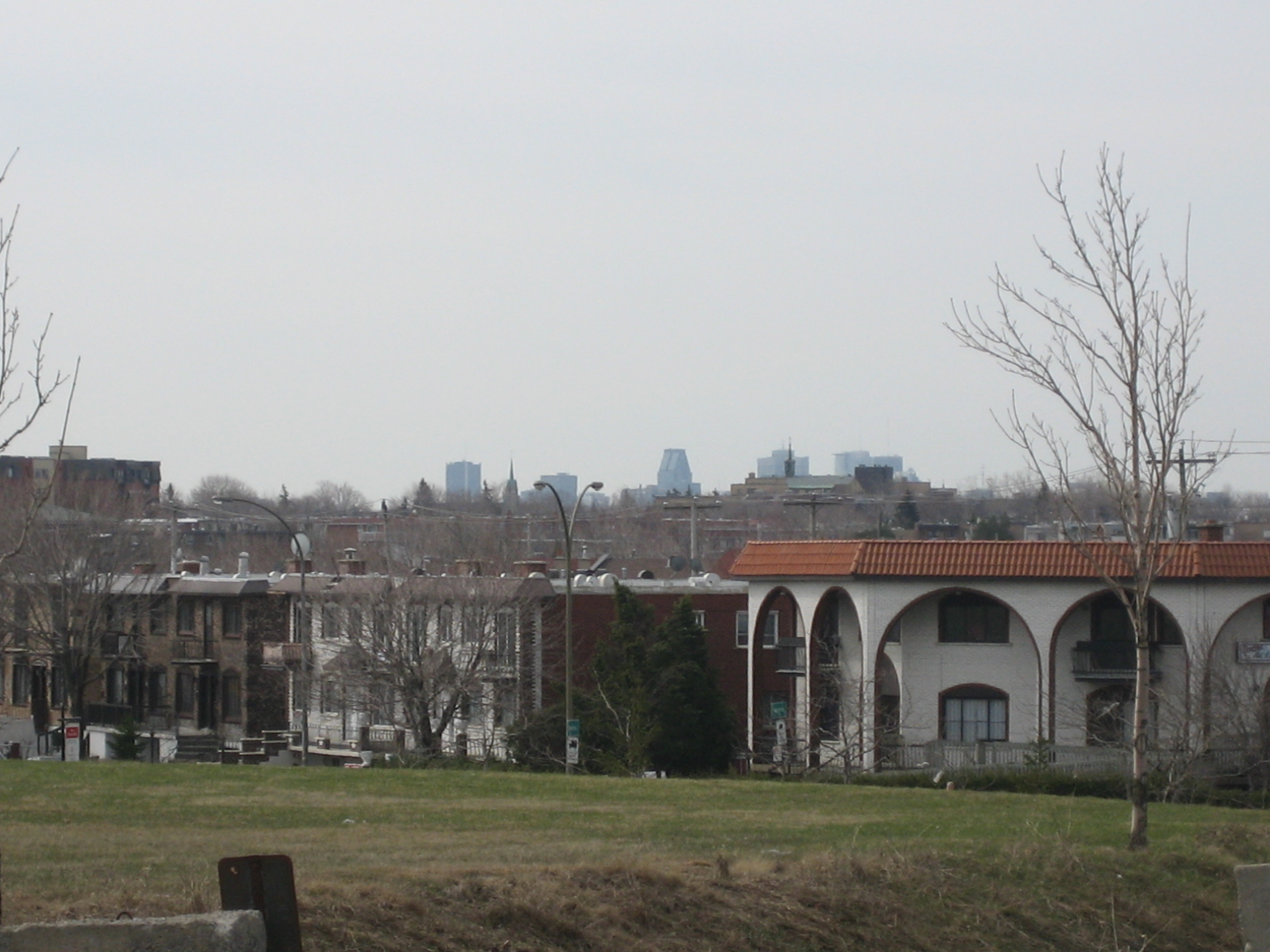
View of the skyline from Saint Leonard.

There is also a very prominent Italian Canadian community in the Montreal borough of Saint Leonard, nicknamed Città Italiana. This borough is located further east on Jean-Talon Boulevard. Città Italiana can be considered Montreal's second Little Italy and is home to Montreal's Via Italia. Many Italian cultural centres, such as The Leonardo Da Vinci Centre, are located in Saint Leonard. Its services are offered in English, French and Italian. This cultural building contains theaters, gyms, bocce playing areas, and a cafe.

== Verdun ==
- Nuns' Island

== Ville-Marie ==
=== Downtown Montreal ===
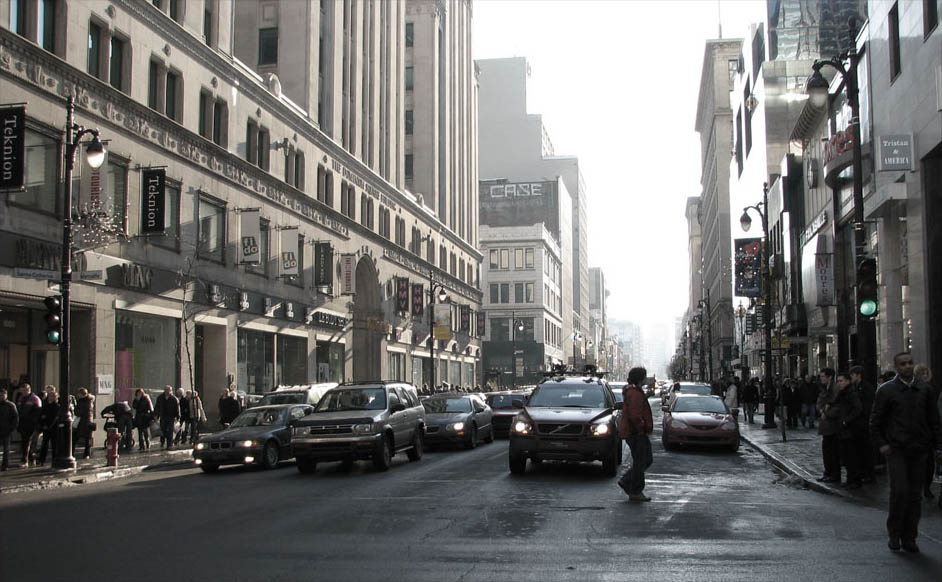
A view of Saint Catherine Street.

Downtown Montreal lies at the foot of Mount Royal, most of which is a major urban park, and extends toward the St. Lawrence River. It is located entirely within the Ville Marie borough. The Downtown area contains dozens of notable skyscrapers—which bylaws restrict to the height of Mount Royal—including the aforementioned 1000 de La Gauchetière and 1250 René-Lévesque. The Tour de la Bourse (Stock Exchange Tower) is also another significant building in Montreal, and is home to the Montreal Exchange, which trades in derivatives such as futures contracts and options. The Montreal Exchange was the first stock exchange in Canada. In 1999 all stock trades were transferred to Toronto in exchange for exclusivity in derivatives trading.

Place Ville-Marie, an I. M. Pei-designed cruciform office tower built in 1962, sits atop an underground shopping mall that forms the nexus of Montreal's underground city, the world's largest at 32 kilometres (20 mi) in length. The underground city gives its 500,000 daily visitors indoor access to 2,000 stores, 200 restaurants, 1,200 offices, 1,600 housing units, 10 metro stations, train stations, bus terminals, and tunnels extending all over downtown. The central axis for downtown is Saint Catherine Street, the city's busiest commercial artery. Other major streets include Sherbrooke, René Lévesque Boulevard, Peel, Mountain Street, De Maisonneuve Boulevard and Crescent Street.

=== Old Montreal ===
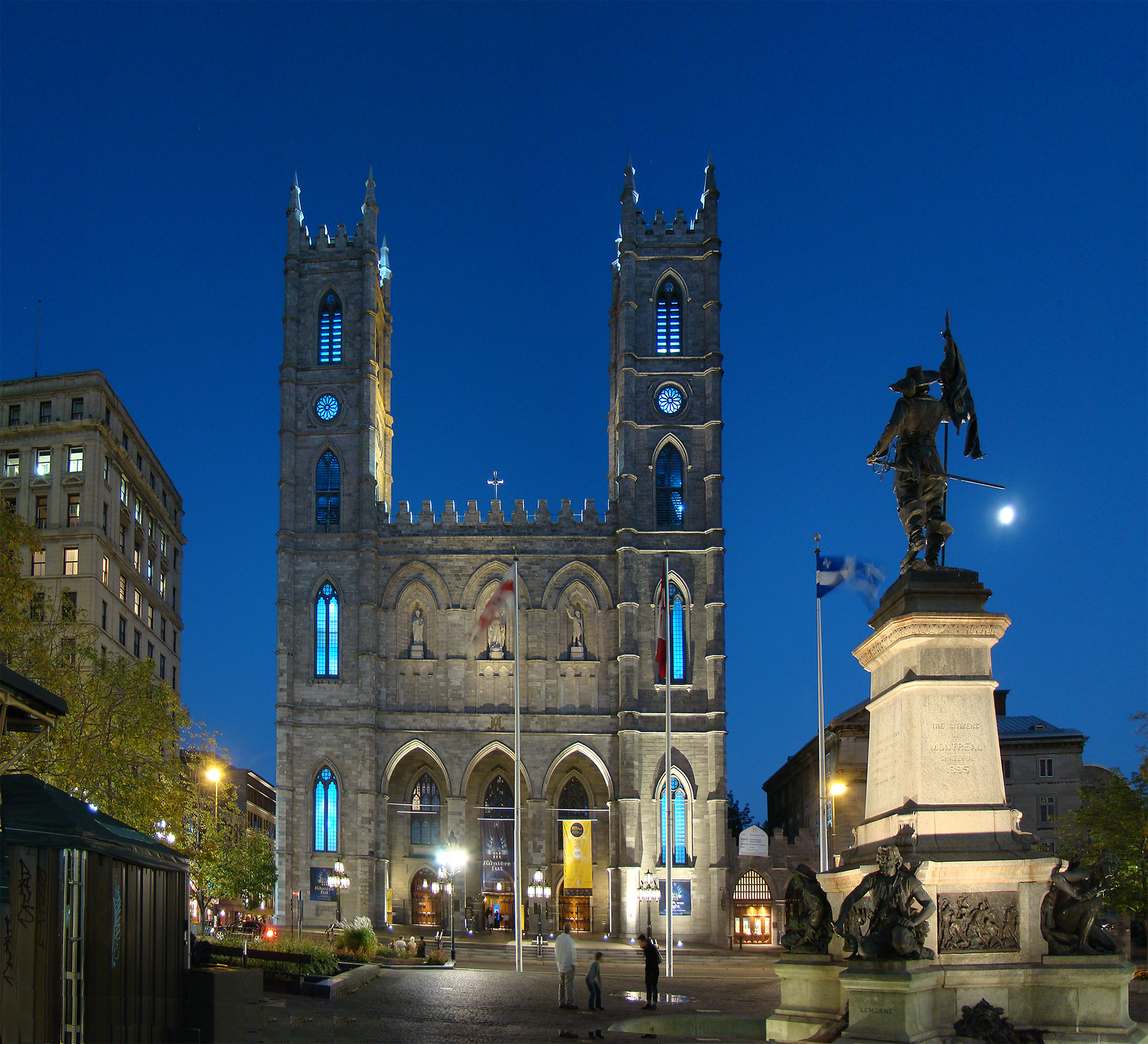
The Notre Dame Basilica viewed from Place d'Armes.

Old Montreal (French: Vieux-Montréal) is a historic area located southeast of downtown containing many different attractions such as the Old Port of Montreal, Place Jacques-Cartier, Montreal City Hall, the Bonsecours Market, Place d'Armes, Pointe-à-Callière Museum, the Notre-Dame de Montréal Basilica, and the Montreal Science Centre.

Architecture and cobbled streets in Old Montreal have been maintained or restored and are frequented by horse-drawn calèches carrying tourists. Old Montreal is accessible from the downtown core via the underground city and is served by several STM bus routes and metro stations, ferries to the South Shore and a network of bicycle paths.

The riverside area adjacent to Old Montreal is known as the Old Port. The Old Port was the former site of the worldwide Port of Montreal, but its shipping operations have been moved further east to its current larger site, leaving the former location as a recreational and historical area maintained by Parks Canada. The new Port of Montreal is now Canada's largest container port and the largest inland port on Earth.

=== Chinatown ===
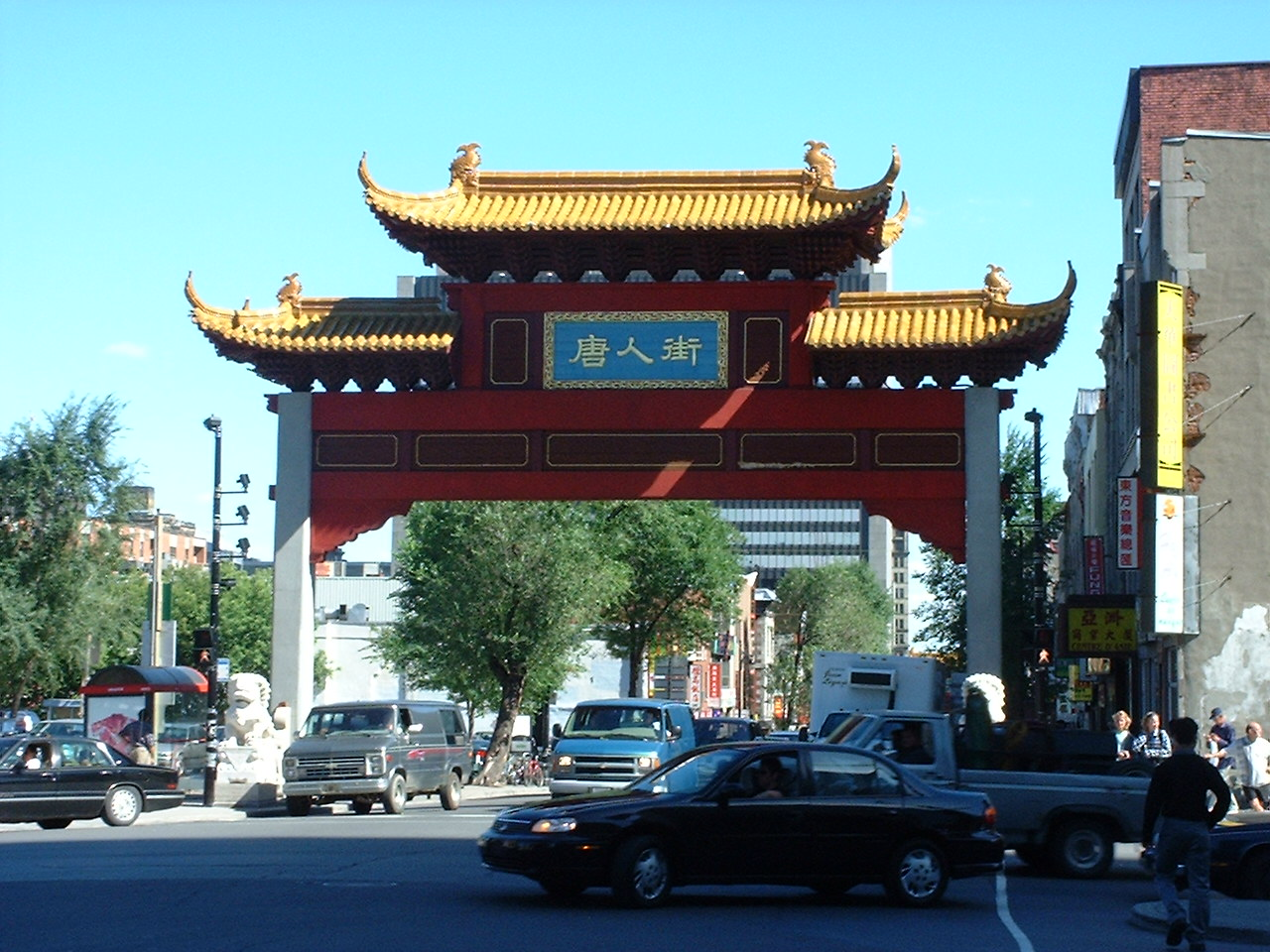
Chinatown in Montreal

Montreal has a small but active Chinatown just south of downtown, featuring many Chinese shops and restaurants, as well as a number of Vietnamese establishments. Several of these restaurants offer dim sum from as early as 7 a.m. to 3 p.m. and can be quite crowded, especially on Sundays. The principal axes of Chinatown are Saint Laurent Boulevard and La Gauchetière Street.

=== Gay Village ===
Montreal is known as a queer or gay-friendly city. Its pride festival, Divers/Cité, is claimed to be one of the largest in North America; organizers estimate that it drew 1.4 million people in 2002. It benefits from financial support from all three levels of government. Montreal is home to one of the largest gay villages in the world. Gay Village (known in French as le Village gai) is centred on the downtown Beaudry metro station. Montreal is a centre of queer life and culture in Canada and hosts several circuit parties every year. As the local gay publication is in French, an alternative for English visitors is GAYroute with details about Montreal's gay community in English. The 2006 World Outgames were held in Montreal. The 2001 census recorded that 6.3% of couples in the city were same-sex, the fourth highest percentage for cities in Canada.

=== Other neighbourhoods ===
- Cité du Multimédia
- Quartier international de Montréal
- Quartier Latin, Montreal
- Quartier des spectacles
- Red-Light District, Montreal
- Sainte-Marie, Montreal
- Shaughnessy Village

== Villeray–Saint-Michel–Parc-Extension ==
=== Park Extension ===
Parc Extension or 'Parc-Ex' as it is known by the locals, is a key location of the city. It is set in the middle of Montreal and has two metro stations along with three of the main bus routes crossing through it. Its name derives from the fact that it is the neighborhood that begins at the end of a main city street; Parc avenue, therefore extending the reach of the long avenue. Some of the most notable things about Parc Extension is that it is home to a little over 100 different ethnicities yet is mostly known for its Greek community which helped make the district what it is today.

==== Greektown ====
Montreal's Greektown has historically been located in the district of Parc Extension. Jean-Talon Boulevard, which runs through Parc Extension, is home to many Greek restaurants and shops. The same can be said for Parc Avenue. Thousands of Greek Canadians took to the streets and celebrated in Greektown after Greece defeated Portugal in the 2004 European Football Championship.

=== Other neighbourhoods ===
- Saint-Michel (former Ville Saint-Michel)
- Villeray

Saint-Michel is the home of Le Boulevard shopping centre (recently renovated) and also is home to the headquarters of the world-renowned Cirque Du Soleil as well as the Tohu, la Cité des Arts du Cirque and the Complexe environmental Saint-Michel. The former Miron and Francon quarries are also located here. Autoroute 40 runs through the area and adds a distinctive feel to the neighborhood. Saint-Michel is one of the most ethnically diverse areas in Montreal and in the province of Quebec. Italians, Haitians, Arabs, Asians, Hispanics as well as people of French descent (Québécois) represent the major ethnic groups of this inner city area. Thus, the area has a very distinctive cultural feel. In the early 1990s, this part of Montreal was mostly known for street gang problems. Although, these problems persists somewhat to this day, the situation is better controlled and opinion of the area has improved.

== Westmount ==
- Victoria Village

== See also ==
- List of municipal electoral districts in Montreal
