= Cartierville =

- Neighbourhood
- Location of Cartierville in Montreal
- Coordinates: 45.531786°N 73.708906°W
- Country: Canada
- Province: Quebec
- City: Montreal
- Borough: Ahuntsic-Cartierville
- Postal Code: H3M, H4J, H4K
- Area codes: 514, 438

Cartierville (French pronunciation: [kaʁtjevil]) is a neighbourhood in the north end of Montreal, Quebec, Canada, located in the borough of Ahuntsic-Cartierville.

Cartierville is bordered to the north by the Rivière des Prairies, to the south by the borough of Saint-Laurent, to the east across Ahuntsic, and to the west by Bois-de-Saraguay Nature Park.

== History ==
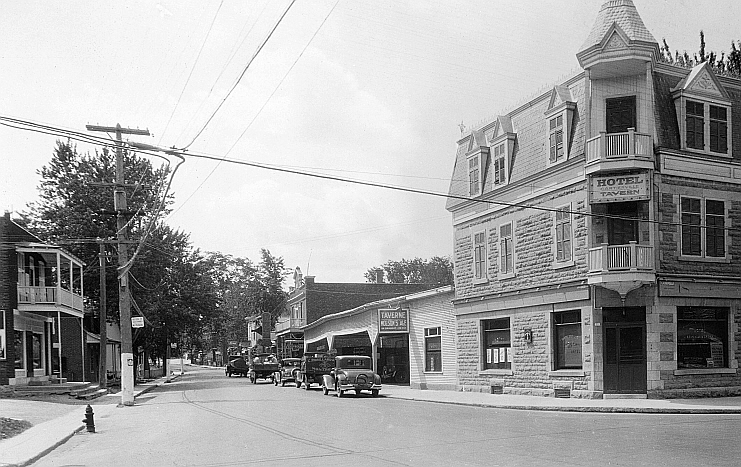
Hotel Cartierville, circa 1935

Cartierville grew as a suburb when it became in 1898 the north terminus of the Montreal Park and Island Railway tramway line, also known as the "17-Cartierville". Named in the honour of Sir George-Étienne Cartier, it became a village officially in 1906. During December 1912, it achieved city status. Two years later, the rural and agricultural part of Cartierville was granted independence from the city and was then known as Ville de Saraguay.

On 22 December 1916, the provincial government ordered the annexation of Cartierville to Montreal. Cartierville was famous for the Belmont Park amusement park which operated from 1929 to the 1980s.

Prior to the 2002 merger with the district (quartier) of Ahuntsic, Cartierville was composed of three neighbourhoods: Cartierville, Bordeaux and Nouveau-Bordeaux.

== Education ==
The Commission scolaire de Montréal operates French-language public schools in Ahuntsic-Cartierville. Four French elementary schools serve the neighbourhood: Beau-Séjour, Louisbourg, Saint-Odile and Alice-Parizeau

The English Montreal School Board (EMSB) operates English-language schools.

The Montreal Public Libraries Network operates the Cartierville and Salaberry library.
