= Collège Ahuntsic =

Public college in Montréal, Quebec

Coordinates: 45°33′7″N 73°38′35″W

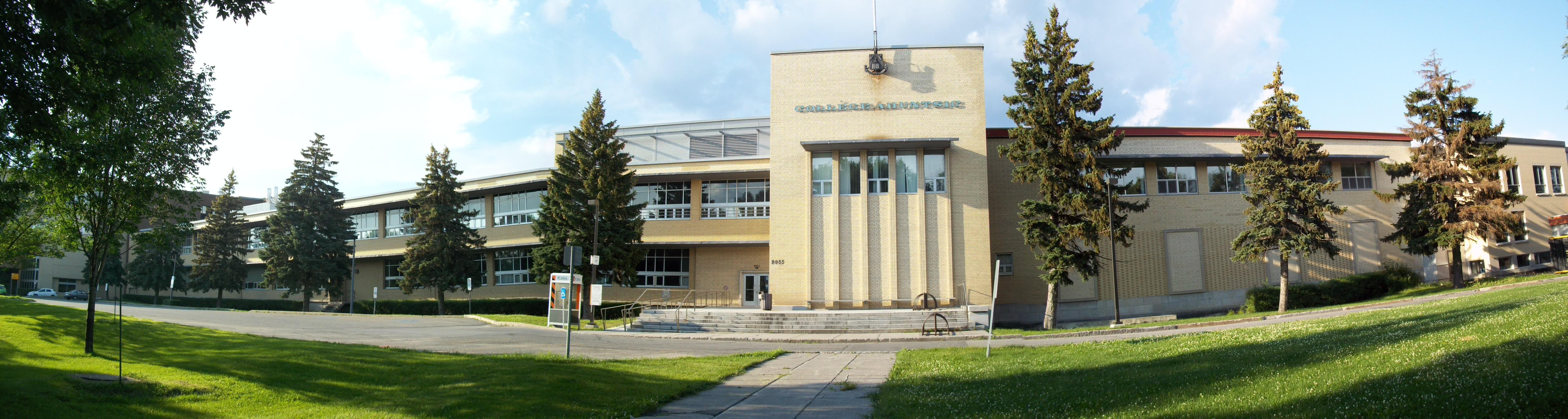
- Type: CEGEP
- Established: 1967
- Affiliations: ACCC, CCAA, QSSF
- General Director: Nathalie Vallée
- Faculty: 600
- Administrative staff: 300
- Students: 10,000
- Undergraduates: pre-university students; technical
- Location: 9155, rue Saint-Hubert; Montreal, Quebec; H2M 1Y8
- Campus: Urban
- Colours: Green and Blue
- Website: www.collegeahuntsic.qc.ca

Collège Ahuntsic is a French-language public college situated in the Ahuntsic-Cartierville borough of Montreal, Quebec, Canada. It was founded in 1967 as a merger of the Collège Saint-Ignace and the Institut de technologies Laval, and in 1970 the Institut des arts graphiques du Quebec joined the college.

== History ==
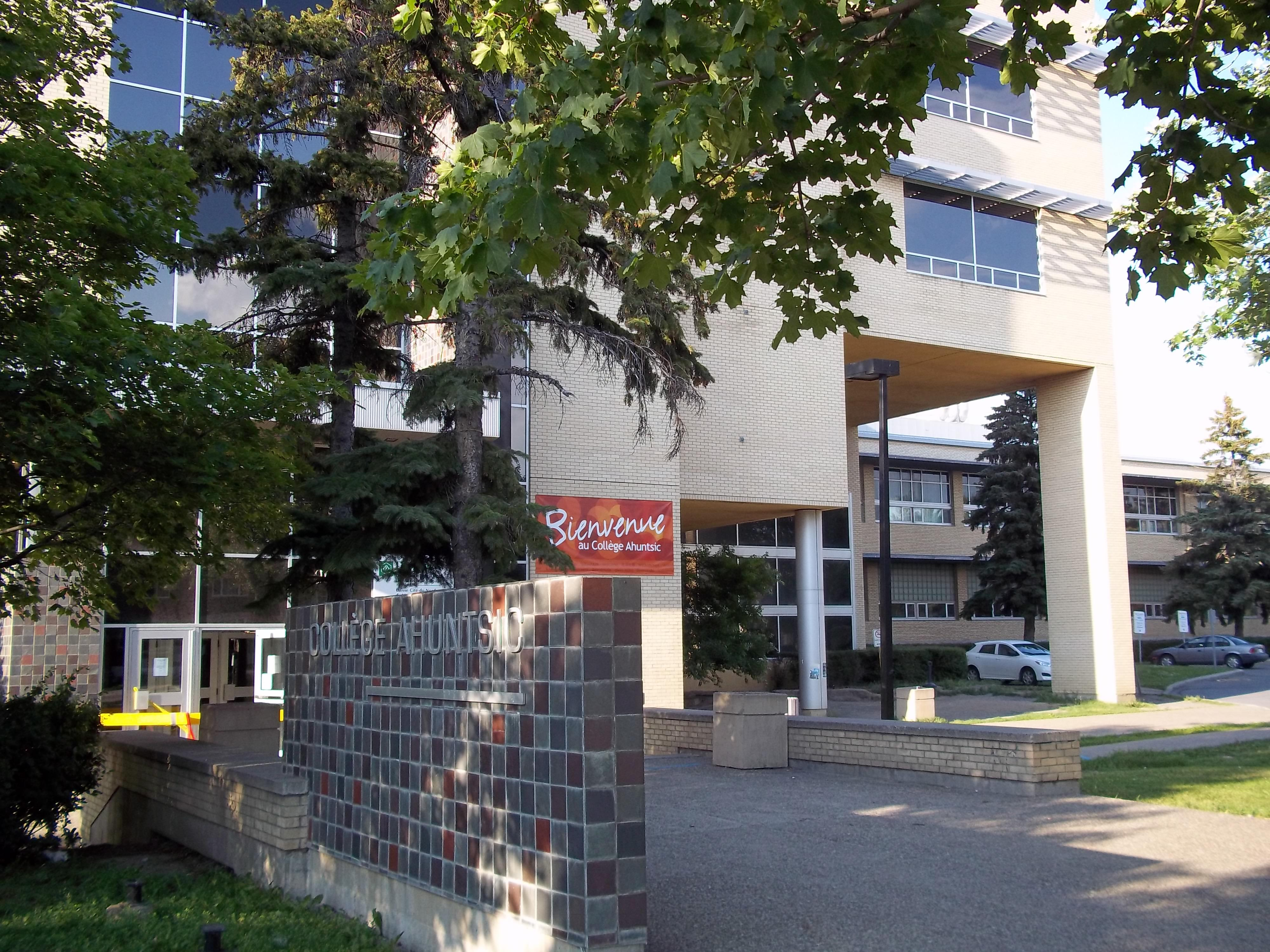
Main entrance and Pavillon Saint-Ignace

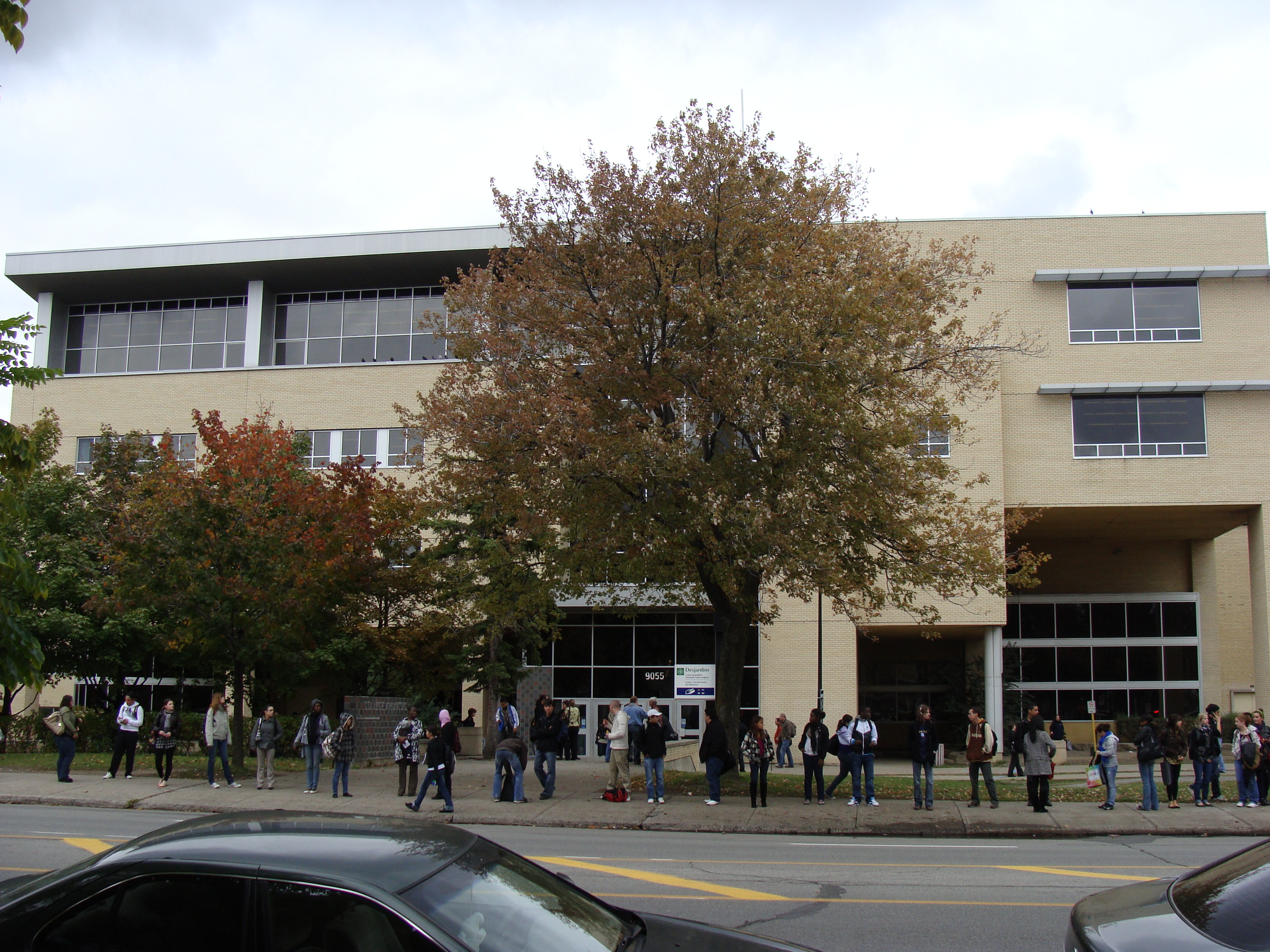
Pavillon Saint-Ignace (natural and social sciences building)

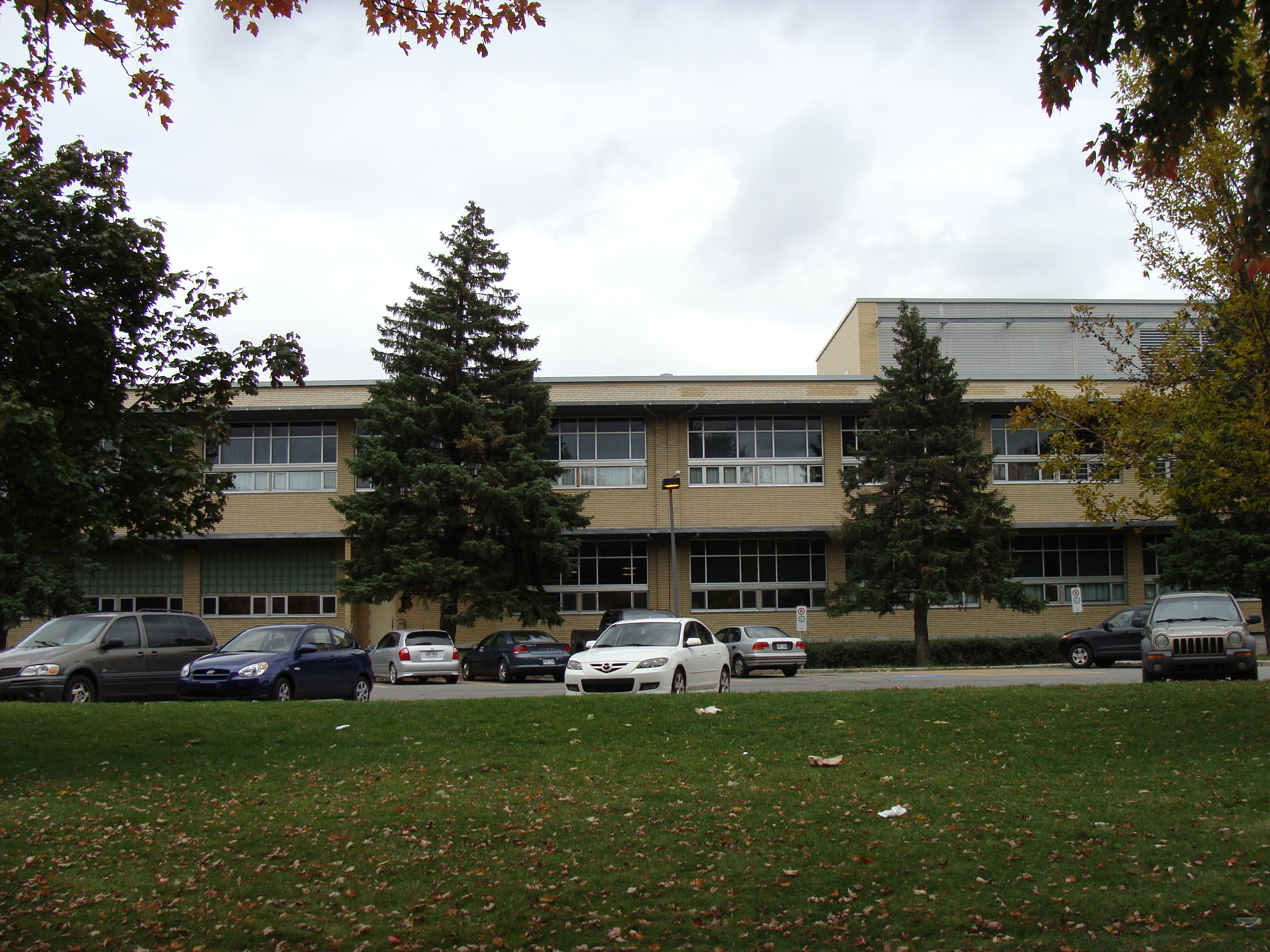
Pavillon Gutenberg (printing building)

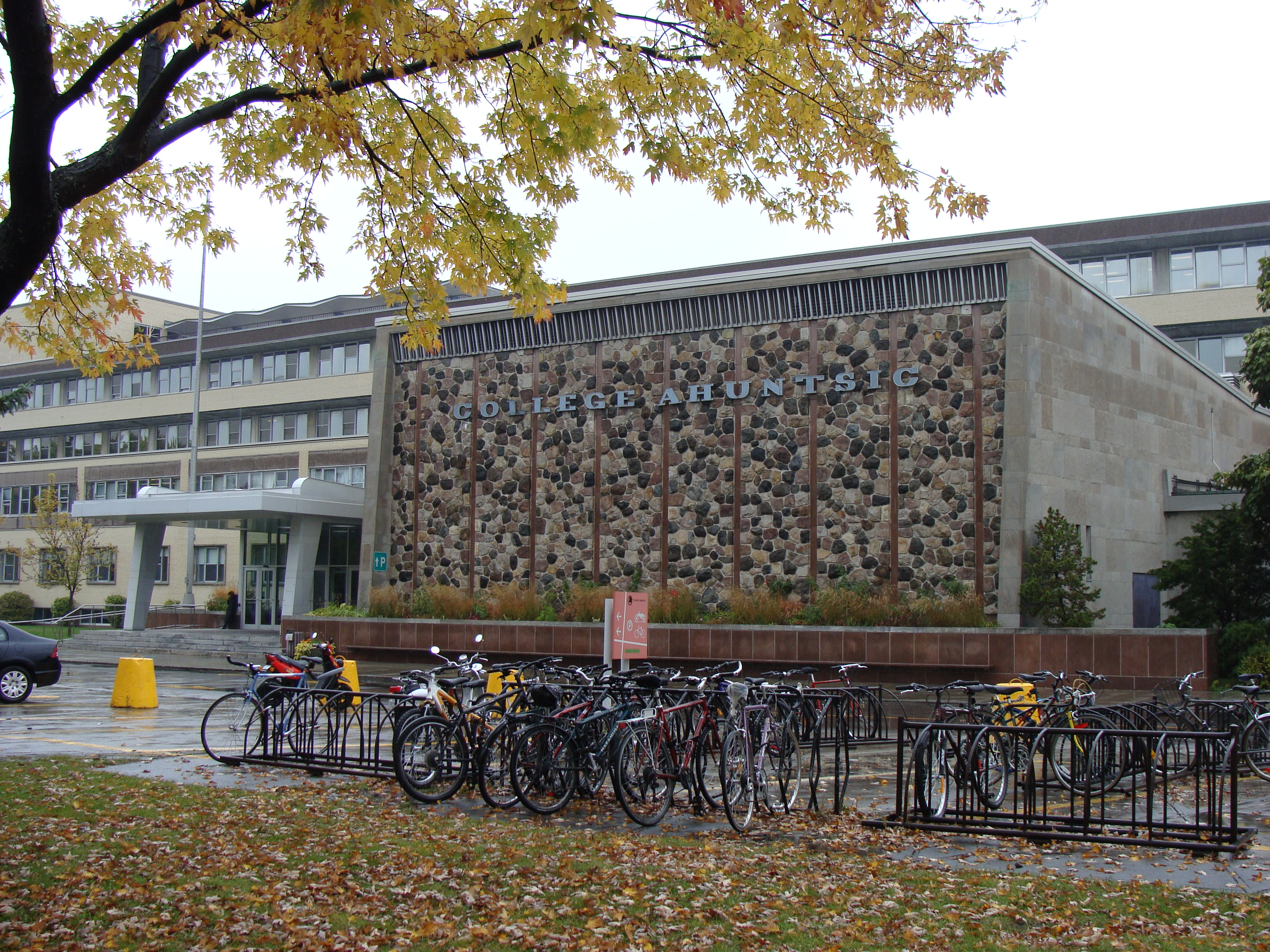
Auditorium at Collège Ahuntsic

Founded in 1967, when the Quebec system of CEGEPs was created, it is today one of the largest CÉGEPs in Quebec. The college was created out of the amalgamation of two former institutions: the Collège Saint-Ignace and the Institut de technologies Laval, founded respectively in 1927 and 1941. The Collège Saint-Ignace taught the humanities, whereas the Institut de technologies de Laval offered the main trade programs of the era.

The name of the new college comes from the district in which it is located, which in turn is named after a missionary called Ahuntsic, possibly of Huron (indigenous Canadian) origin, who lived in the early days of the new colony of Quebec.

In 1970, the adjoining school, the Institut des arts graphiques du Quebec, which was a school of printing, joined the college.

Following the lead of McGill University (with formerly the Redmen sport teams), the name "Indiens" (Indians) and its logo have been dropped from the college's sports teams to be replaced by Les Aigles (The Eagles) in 2020.

== Programs ==
The CEGEP offers two types of programs: pre-university and technical. The pre-university programs, which take two years to complete, cover the subject matters which roughly correspond to the additional year of high school (grade 12) and the first year of university given elsewhere in Canada. The technical programs, which take three-years to complete, applies to students who wish to pursue a skill trade.

Today, the college comprises three pre-university programs; 26 technical programs; 6000 regular education/full-time students and 4000 continuous education/part-time students; 900 employees, divided between 600 faculty members and 300 management and support staff.

=== Pre-university programs ===
- Sciences
  - Health sciences
  - Pure and applied sciences
  - "Passe-partout" (a general pass program leading to all science university programs)
- Social sciences
  - Business administration
  - Psychology and social interactions
  - Social studies
  - Education and culture
  - International studies
- Arts and letters
  - Cinema and media studies
  - Literary and artistic studies
  - Languages, world, and culture: German
  - Languages, world, and culture: Spanish
  - Languages, world, and culture: Advanced Spanish and German

Usually, pre-university programs require four semesters (two years) to complete and lead to the obtention of a DEC.

=== Technical and vocatiaonal programs ===
- Health programs
  - Medical electrophysiology technology
  - Medical imaging technology
  - Nuclear medicine technology
  - Radiation oncology technology
  - Prehospital emergency care/paramedic
- Physics programs
  - Laboratory technology
    - Biothechnologies
    - Analytical chemistry
  - Civil engineering technology
  - Building mechanics technology
  - Geomatics technology
    - Geodesy
  - Industrial engineering technology
  - Electronics technology
    - Telecommunications
    - Computers and networks
  - Industrial electronics technology
- Auxiliary justice programs
  - Police technology
  - Correctional intervention technology
  - Paralegal technology
- Administration programs
  - Accounting and management technology
  - Trade management
  - Medical archives
  - Computer science technology
    - Management computing
    - Management of computer networks
- Graphic communications programs
  - Computer graphics
  - Graphic design and prepress
  - Printing technology
  - Project management in computer graphics

Usually, technical and career programs require six semesters (three years) to complete and lead to a terminal technical degree, a diplôme d'études collégiales, or DEC.

=== Particular programs ===
==== Work-study programs ====
Work-study programs were created for students who wish to work part-time while completing a college diploma in a particular field of study. Although the programs usually require six semesters to complete, the time needed may be increased as a result of the part-time job.

- Civil engineering technology
- Geomatics technology (geodesy)
- Building mechanics technology
- Industrial electronics technology
- Computer science technology

==== Technical CEGEP-university bridge programs ====
- Laboratory technology (biotechnologies)
- Accounting and management technology
- Trade management
- Computer science technology
- Civil engineering technology
- Computer graphics

==== Vocational high school-cegep bridge programs ====
- Graphic design and prepress
- Printing technology

== See also ==
- List of colleges in Quebec
- Higher education in Quebec
