= Nicolas Viel =

Father Nicolas Viel, O.M.R.
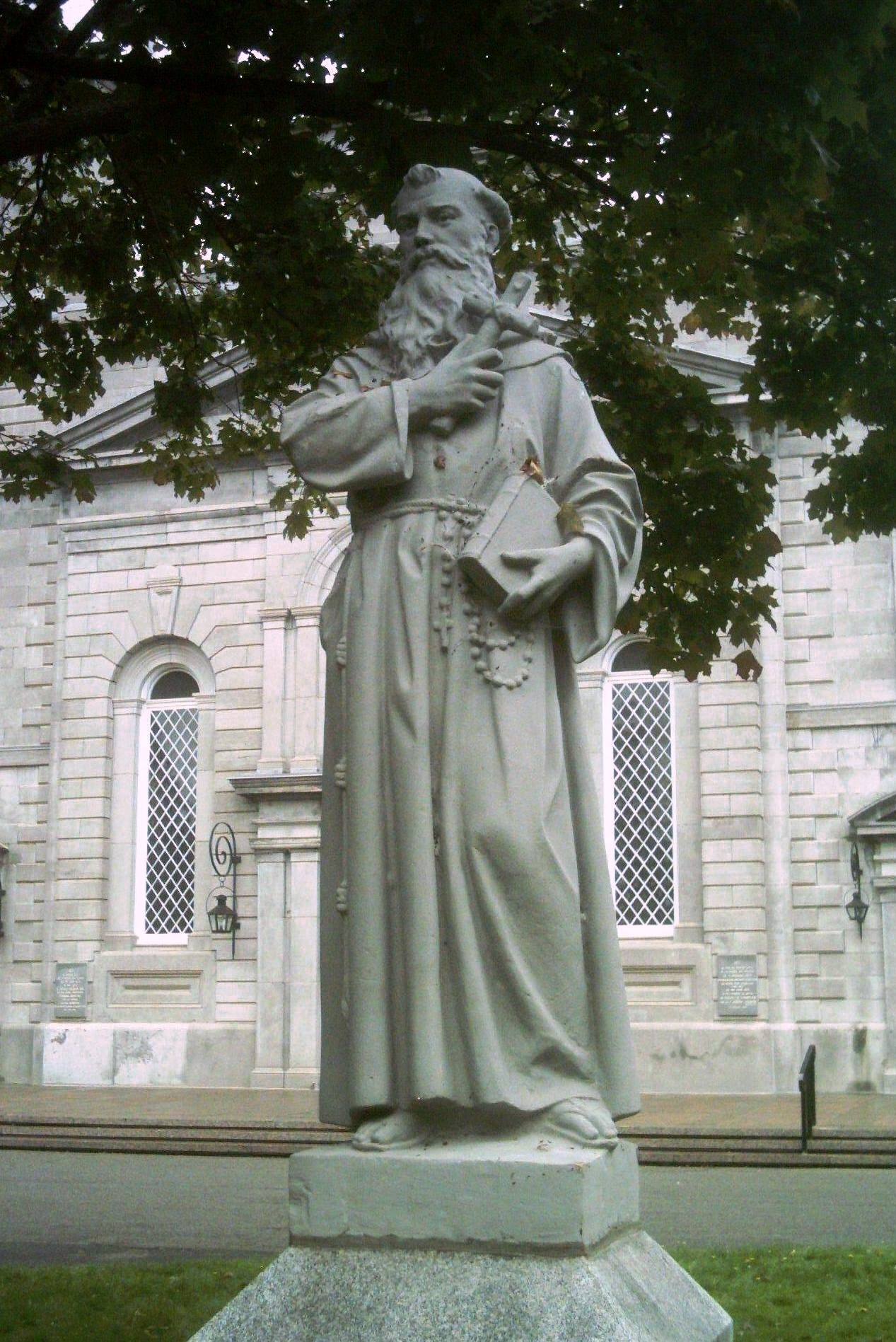
- Born: Coutances, Normandy, France
- Died: June 25, 1625; Sault-au-Récollet, Quebec, Canada
- Cause of death: Drowning
- Body discovered: June 28, 1625
- Resting place: Quebec City, Quebec, Canada
- Citizenship: French
- Occupations: Franciscan friar and missionary

Father Nicolas Viel, O.M.R., (died 25 June 1625) was a French Recollect missionary to the Wendat (Huron) from 1623 to 1625.

== Biography ==
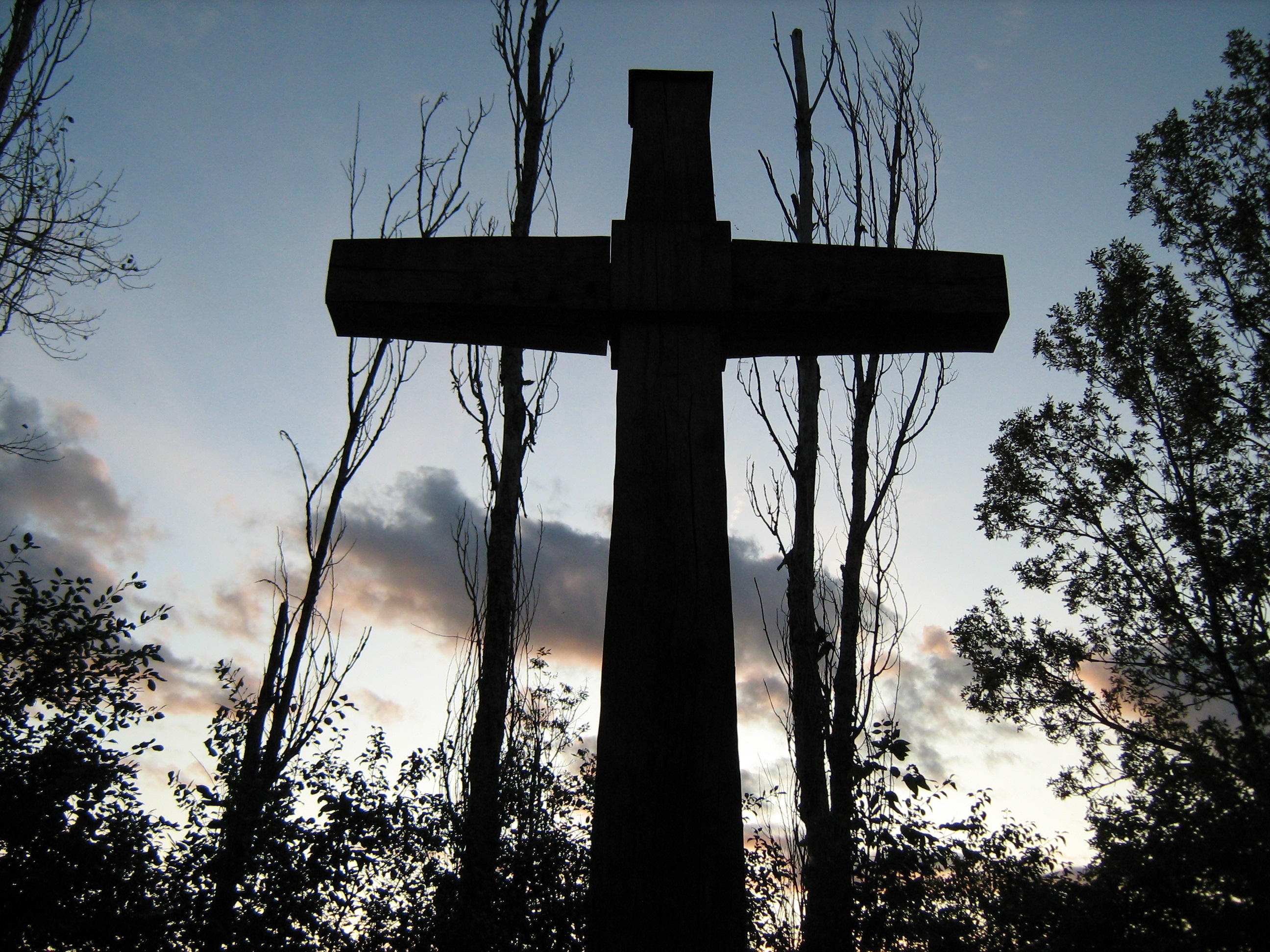
Cross in honour of Nicolas Viel and Ahuntsic (Missionary) at Parc de l'Île-de-la-Visitation

Among the first missionaries sent by France to its colony, Viel traveled to Huron territory, arriving there with fellow Recollect Father Joseph Le Caron in 1623. He was studying the language and collecting material to add to Le Caron's dictionary.

After almost two years, in May 1625, Viel decided to return to Quebec in the company of a band of Wendat, with the intention of making a few days' retreat and then returning to his missions. It is known that he never reached Quebec, but was drowned in the last chute of the Riviere des Prairies, which from that time bears the name of Sault-au-Récollet. The neophyte Auhaitsique, whom he had instructed and baptized, met with the same fate.

Sagard and Le Clercq give accounts of Father Viel's missionary work, and of his death. Their information regarding his death was obtained after the fact and through interpreters. The canoe(s) apparently attempted to shoot a rapid that would usually have been portaged. Suspicions that the drowning was intentional appear to be weakly based on the survival of the accompanying Wendat, and tensions between the Wendat, the Haudenosaunee, and the French. They have, nonetheless, led to repeated assertions that Viel and his companion were murdered. French Jesuit priest Charlevoix could only conclude "Whether there was some miscalculation in the measures they took or whether it was brought about by design the canoe capsized." The rapids were certainly dangerous enough to explain the outcome: Sagard wrote that "Time and again we ran the risk of losing our lives and of being swallowed up in the falls and whirlpools as were, since then, good Father Nicholas and a young boy Francis, our disciple."

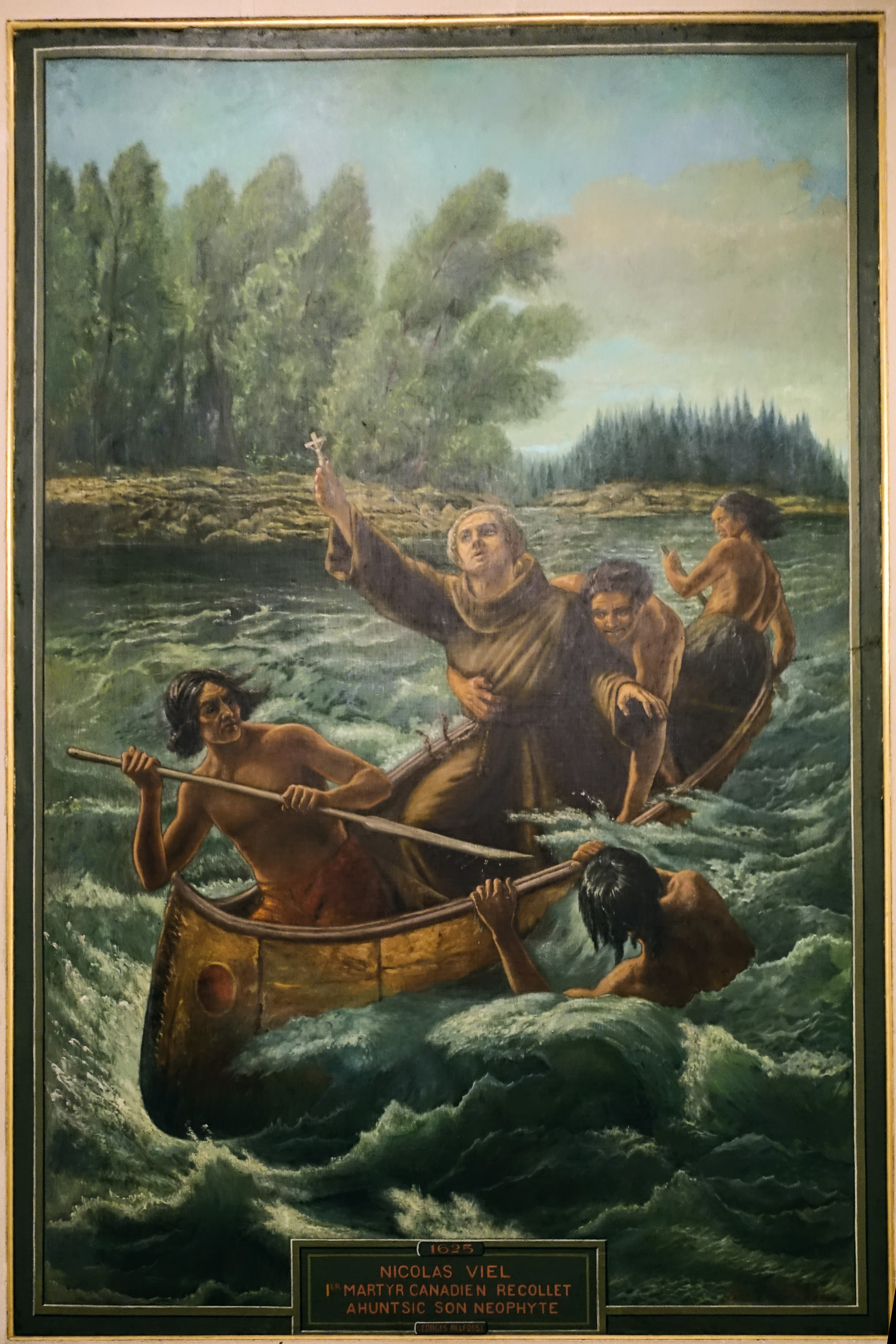
Portrayal by Georges Delfosse, Cathedral-Basilica of Mary, Queen of the World, Montreal

Viel is sometimes referred to as the first Canadian martyr, which can be seen as technically correct given that the Catechism of the Catholic Church states "Martyrdom is the supreme witness given to the truth of the faith: it means bearing witness even unto death." A painting by Georges Delfosse in Cathédrale Marie-Reine-du-Monde, Montreal, Quebec, shows Viel holding aloft a cross as the canoe is about to capsize. The scene, in which one person holds a broken paddle and another has one arm around Viel, can be ambiguously interpreted. The designation of martyr has been strongly opposed by those who see it as supporting the belief that Viel and Auhaitsique were murdered by the Wendat.

According to the records of the Recollets, Father Viel was buried in St. Charles's Chapel, Quebec City, 25 June 1625.
