= Sault-au-Récollet =

Recollet Rapids
- Neighbourhood
- Sault-au-Récollet
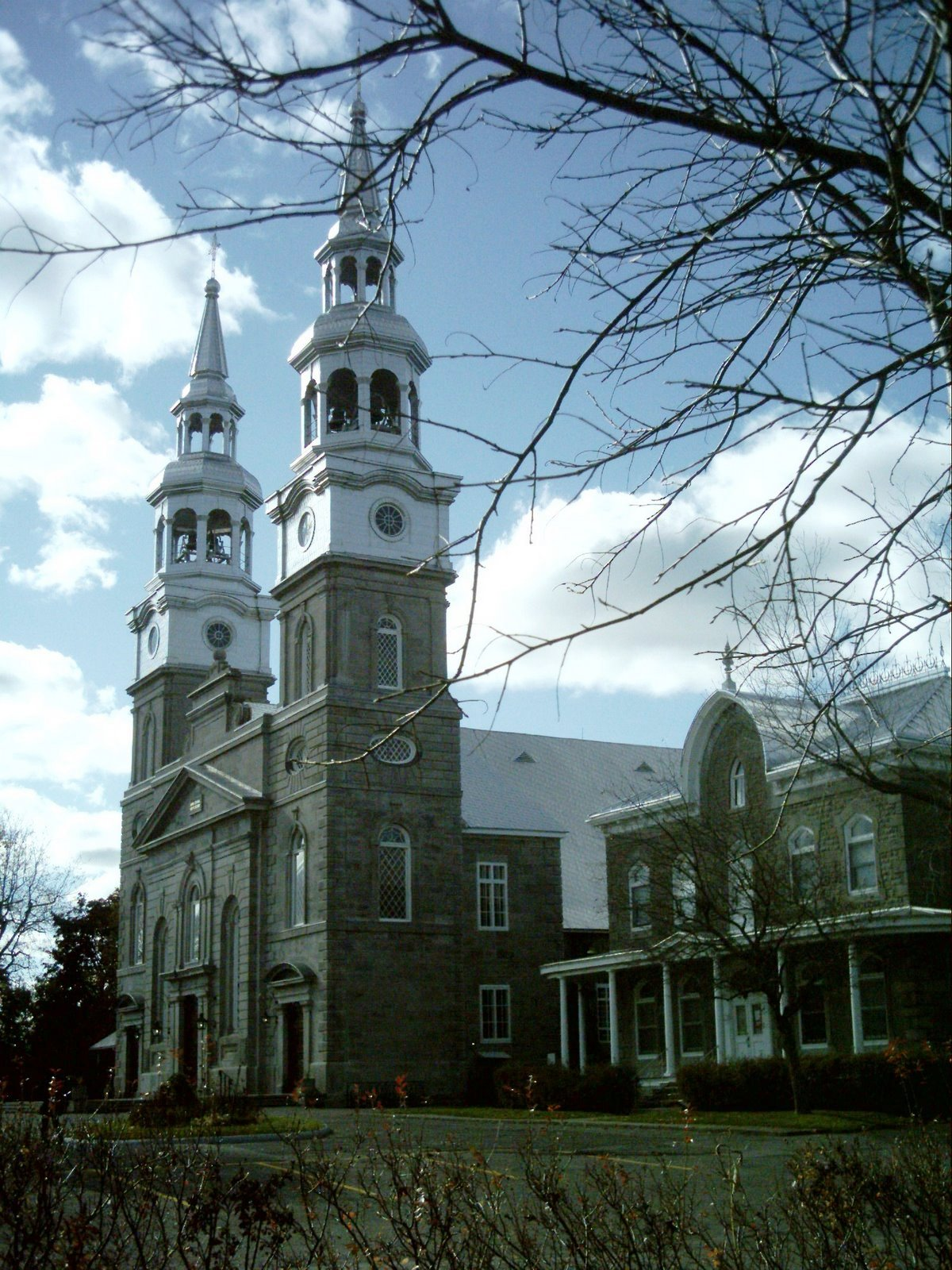
- Visitation Church

- Location of Sault-au-Récollet in Montreal
- Coordinates: 45.57764°N 73.64582°W
- Country: Canada
- Province: Quebec
- City: Montreal
- Borough: Ahuntsic-Cartierville
- Postal Code: H2B
- Area codes: 514, 438

Sault-au-Récollet (French pronunciation: [so o ʁekɔlɛ], Recollet Rapids) is a neighbourhood in Montreal, Canada. It is located in the eastern edge of the borough of Ahuntsic-Cartierville, bordering the Rivière des Prairies. Autoroute 19 connects Sault-au-Récollet to Laval. The neighbourhood was designated as a heritage site by the City of Montreal in 1992. The Church of the Visitation at Sault-au-Récollet is the oldest church on the Island of Montreal and was built between 1749 and 1752. The streetcar suburb was annexed by Montreal to form the former borough of Ahuntsic-Bordeaux in 1918. A housing boom, mostly made up of multiplexes, followed in the 1940s and 1950s.

== Name ==
The district is named after the Recollects, a friars' order to which the first missionaries sent from the colony of Quebec were sent to the country of the Hurons; including Nicolas Viel.

Viel had been one of the first missionaries in the country of the Hurons since 1923. In May 1625, Viel decided to return to Quebec city in the company of a band of Hurons, including Ahuntsic, with the intention of making a few days' retreat and then returning to his missions. It is known that both Viel and Ahuntsic drowned in the last chute of the Riviere des Prairies, which from that time bears the name of Sault-au-Récollet. An adjacent district has also been named in honour of Ahuntsic.

== Fort Lorette ==
The Sulpician missionaries had been operating a mission to the indigenous peoples of the area at Fort de la Montagne for about 20 years when they decided to move to Sault-au-Récollet. Part of this decision was due to an increase in brandy trade and exposure to alcoholism, and part was to move the fort to a more easily defended section of the island. In 1696, a flock of 210 Algonquins was moved to Fort Lorette under the guidance of Fr Robert Gay.

== Gallery ==
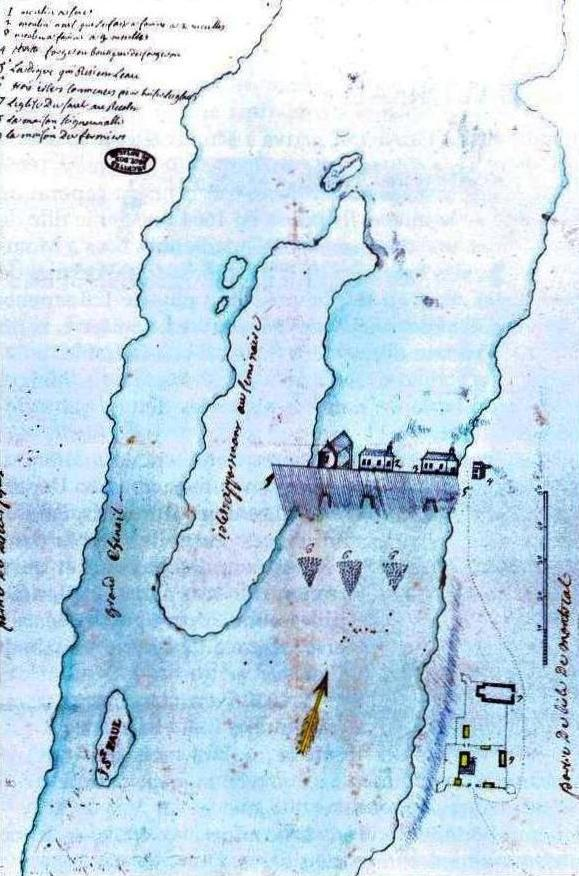
In 1726

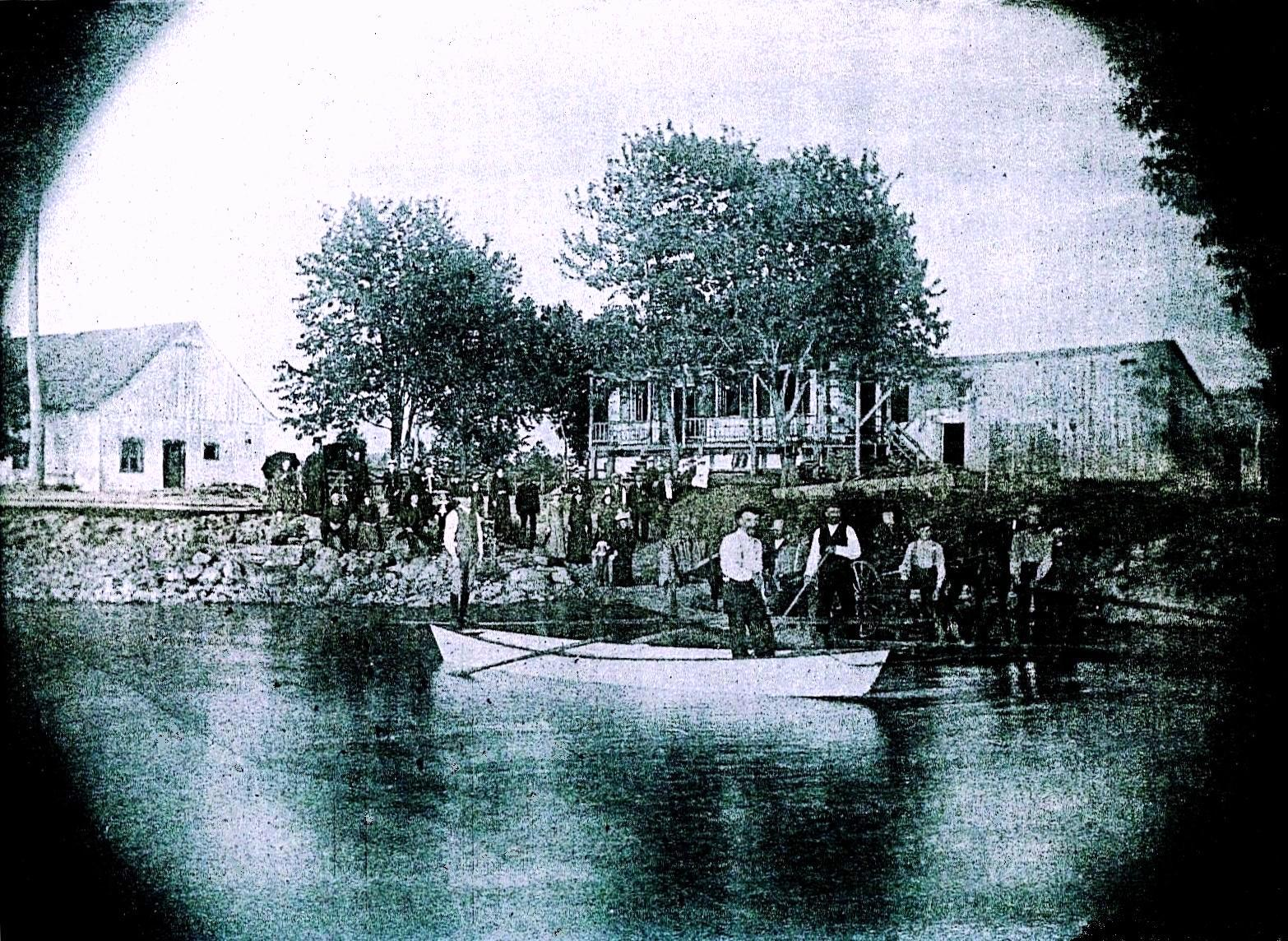
1890

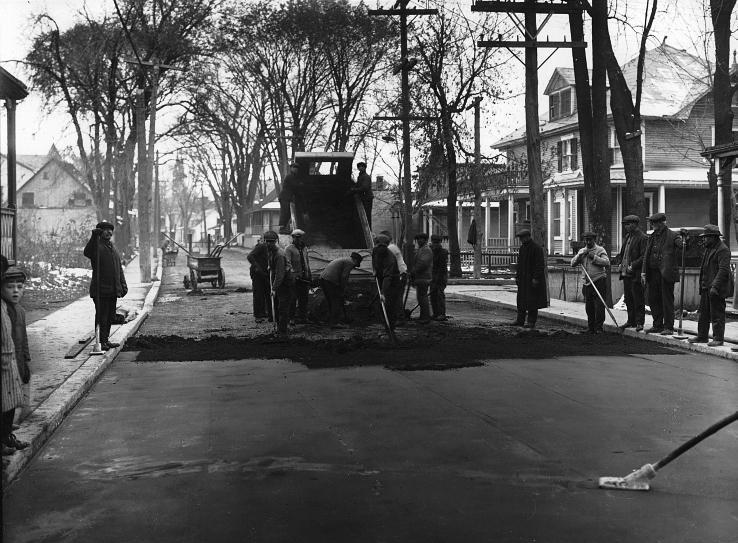
1930

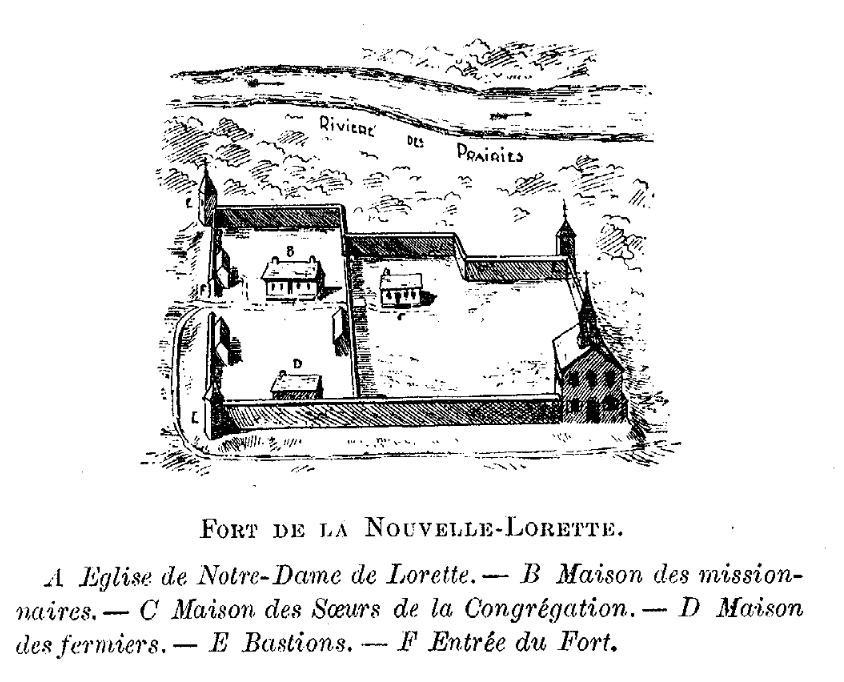
An illustration of Fort de la Nouvelle-Lorette in 1672

== See also ==
- Île de la Visitation
- Papineau-Leblanc Bridge
