= List of postal codes of Canada: H =

This is a list of postal codes in Canada where the first letter is H. Postal codes beginning with H are located within the Canadian province of Quebec, except for H0H. Only the first three characters are listed, corresponding to the Forward Sortation Area (FSA).

Canada Post provides a free postal code look-up tool on its website, via its mobile apps for such smartphones as the iPhone and BlackBerry, and sells hard-copy directories and CD-ROMs. Many vendors also sell validation tools, which allow customers to properly match addresses and postal codes. Hard-copy directories can also be consulted in all post offices, and some libraries.

== Montreal, Laval, and Akwesasne ==
There are currently 123 FSAs in this list. No postal codes yet exist that start with H6*. H0M is an arbitrary FSA assignment, over 100 km from the centre of Montreal, as is H0H (representing the North Pole).

H0A
Not assigned

H1A
Montreal
(Pointe-aux-Trembles)

H2A
Montreal
East Saint-Michel

H3A
Montreal
North Downtown
(McGill University)

H4A
Montreal
Northeast Notre-Dame-de-Grâce

H5A
Montreal
(Place Bonaventure)

H7A
Laval
East Duvernay

H8A
Not assigned

H9A
Dollard-des-Ormeaux
Northwest

H0B
Not assigned

H1B
Montréal-Est

H2B
Montreal
Sault-au-Récollet

H3B
Montreal
East Downtown

H4B
Montreal
Southwest Notre-Dame-de-Grâce

H5B
Montreal
(Complexe Desjardins)

H7B
Laval
(Saint-François)

H8B
Not assigned

H9B
Dollard-des-Ormeaux
East

H0C
Not assigned

H1C
Montreal
Northeast Rivière-des-Prairies

H2C
Montreal
Central Ahuntsic

H3C
Montreal
(Griffintown)
(Includes Île Notre-Dame and Île Sainte-Hélène)

H4C
Montreal
(Saint-Henri)

H5C
Not assigned

H7C
Laval
(Saint-Vincent-de-Paul)

H8C
Not assigned

H9C
Montreal
Northeast L'Île-Bizard

H0E
Not assigned

H1E
Montreal
Southwest Rivière-des-Prairies

H2E
Montreal
Northeast Villeray

H3E
Montreal
(L'Île-Des-Soeurs)

H4E
Montreal
(Ville Émard)

H5E
Not assigned

H7E
Laval
(Duvernay)

H8E
Not assigned

H9E
Montreal
Southwest L'Île-Bizard

H0G
Not assigned

H1G
Montreal
North Montréal-Nord

H2G
Montreal
Northeast Petite-Patrie

H3G
Montreal
Southeast Downtown
(Concordia University)

H4G
Montreal
North Verdun

H5G
Not assigned

H7G
Laval
(Pont-Viau)

H8G
Not assigned

H9G
Dollard-des-Ormeaux
Southwest

H0H
Reserved
0H0: Santa Claus

H1H
Montreal
South Montréal-Nord

H2H
Montreal
North Plateau Mont-Royal

H3H
Montreal
Southwest Downtown

H4H
Montreal
South Verdun

H5H
Not assigned

H7H
Laval
West Auteuil

H8H
Not assigned

H9H
Montreal
(Central Pierrefonds &
Sainte-Geneviève)

H0J
Not assigned

H1J
Montreal
West Anjou

H2J
Montreal
North Central Plateau Mont-Royal

H3J
Montreal
(Petite-Bourgogne)

H4J
Montreal
Central Cartierville

H5J
Not assigned

H7J
Laval
Northeast Auteuil

H8J
Not assigned

H9J
Kirkland
(East)

H0K
Not assigned

H1K
Montreal
East Anjou

H2K
Montreal
North Centre-Sud
(Sainte-Marie)

H3K
Montreal
(Pointe-Saint-Charles)

H4K
Montreal
Southwest Cartierville

H5K
Not assigned

H7K
Laval
South Auteuil

H8K
Not assigned

H9K
Montreal
(West Pierrefonds) &
Kirkland (West)

H0L
Not assigned

H1L
Montreal
North Mercier

H2L
Montreal
South Centre-Sud
(Le Village)

H3L
Montreal
Southwest Ahuntsic

H4L
Montreal
Inner Northeast Saint-Laurent

H5L
Not assigned

H7L
Laval
(Sainte-Rose)

H8L
Not assigned

H9L
Not assigned

H0M
Akwesasne Region
0A1 & 1A0: Akwesasne

H1M
Montreal
West Mercier

H2M
Montreal
East Ahuntsic

H3M
Montreal
Northeast Cartierville

H4M
Montreal
East Saint-Laurent

H5M
Not assigned

H7M
Laval
(Vimont)

H8M
Not assigned

H9M
Not assigned

H0N
Not assigned

H1N
Montreal
Southeast Mercier

H2N
Montreal
Soueheast Ahuntsic

H3N
Montreal
(Parc-Extension)

H4N
Montreal
Outer Northeast Saint-Laurent

H5N
Not assigned

H7N
Laval
(Laval-des-Rapides)

H8N
Montreal
Northwest LaSalle

H9N
Not assigned

H0P
Not assigned

H1P
Montreal
North Saint-Léonard

H2P
Montreal
West Villeray

H3P
Mount Royal
North

H4P
Mount Royal
South

H5P
Not assigned

H7P
Laval
Fabreville

H8P
Montreal
Southeast LaSalle

H9P
Dorval
Outskirts

H0R
Not assigned

H1R
Montreal
West Saint-Léonard

H2R
Montreal
Southeast Villeray

H3R
Mount Royal
Central

H4R
Montreal
Central Saint-Laurent

H5R
Not assigned

H7R
Laval
(Laval-sur-le-Lac)

H8R
Montreal
(LaSalle and Ville Saint-Pierre)

H9R
Pointe-Claire
North Central

H0S
Not assigned

H1S
Montreal
Southeast Saint-Léonard

H2S
Montreal
Southwest Petite-Patrie

H3S
Montreal
North Côte-des-Neiges

H4S
Montreal
Southwest Saint-Laurent

H5S
Not assigned

H7S
Laval
Northeast Chomedey

H8S
Montreal
East Lachine

H9S
Pointe-Claire
Dorval
L'Île-Dorval

H0T
Not assigned

H1T
Montreal
North Rosemont

H2T
Montreal
West Plateau Mont-Royal

H3T
Montreal
Northeast Côte-des-Neiges (Université de Montréal)

H4T
Montreal
Southeast Saint-Laurent

H5T
Not assigned

H7T
Laval
Northwest Chomedey

H8T
Montreal
West Lachine

H9T
Not assigned

H0V
Not assigned

H1V
Montreal
(Maisonneuve)

H2V
Montreal
(Outremont)

H3V
Montreal
East Côte-des-Neiges

H4V
Côte Saint-Luc
East

H5V
Not assigned

H7V
Laval
East Chomedey

H8V
Not assigned

H9V
Not assigned

H0W
Not assigned

H1W
Montreal
(Hochelaga)

H2W
Montreal
South Central Plateau Mont-Royal

H3W
Montreal
Southwest Côte-des-Neiges

H4W
Côte Saint-Luc
West

H5W
Not assigned

H7W
Laval
South Chomedey

H8W
Not assigned

H9W
Beaconsfield

H0X
Not assigned

H1X
Montreal
Central Rosemont

H2X
Montreal
Southeast Plateau Mont-Royal

H3X
Hampstead &
Montreal (West Snowdon &
North Notre-Dame-de-Grâce)

H4X
Côte Saint-Luc
Montreal West

H5X
Not assigned

H7X
Laval
(Sainte-Dorothée)

H8X
Not assigned

H9X
Sainte-Anne-de-Bellevue
Baie-D'Urfé
Senneville

H0Y
Not assigned

H1Y
Montreal
South Rosemont

H2Y
Montreal
South Old Montreal

H3Y
Westmount
North

H4Y
Dorval
Central (YUL)

H5Y
Not assigned

H7Y
Laval
(Îles-Laval)

H8Y
Montreal
(Roxboro)

H9Y
Not assigned

H0Z
Not assigned

H1Z
Montreal
West Saint-Michel

H2Z
Montreal
North Old Montreal
& Southeast Downtown

H3Z
Westmount
South

H4Z

Not assigned

H5Z
Not assigned

H7Z
Not assigned

H8Z
Montreal
(East Pierrefonds)

H9Z
Not assigned

== Most populated FSAs ==
1. H1G, 50,989
2. H7N, 44,641
3. H7W, 42,580
4. H1E, 42,568
5. H7L, 37,893

== Least populated FSAs ==
1. H4T, 0
2. H4S, 567
3. H3B, 1,900
4. H7J, 2,161
5. H7B, 2,957
