= By-elections to the 44th Canadian Parliament =

2021–2025 elections for vacant seats

- November 22, 2021 – March 23, 2025

11 seats in the House of Commons
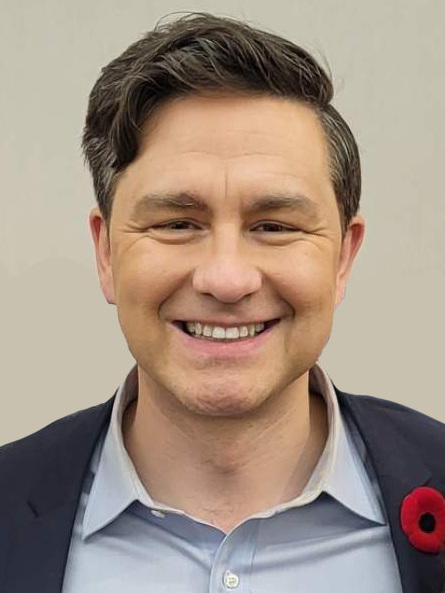

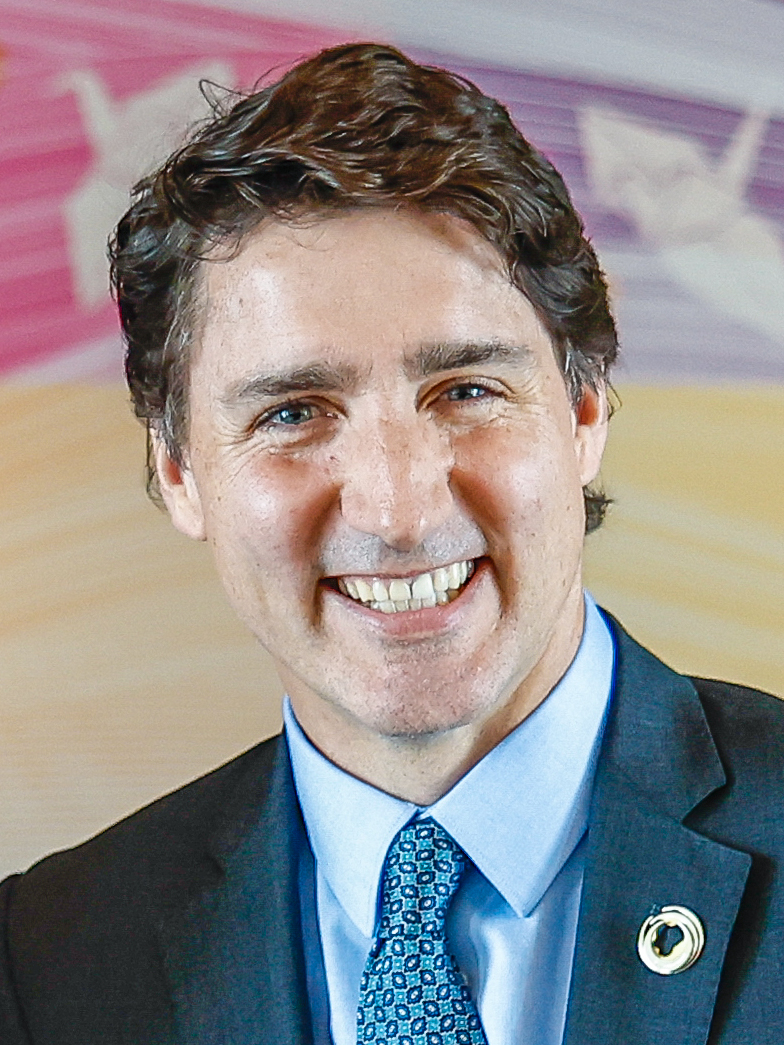

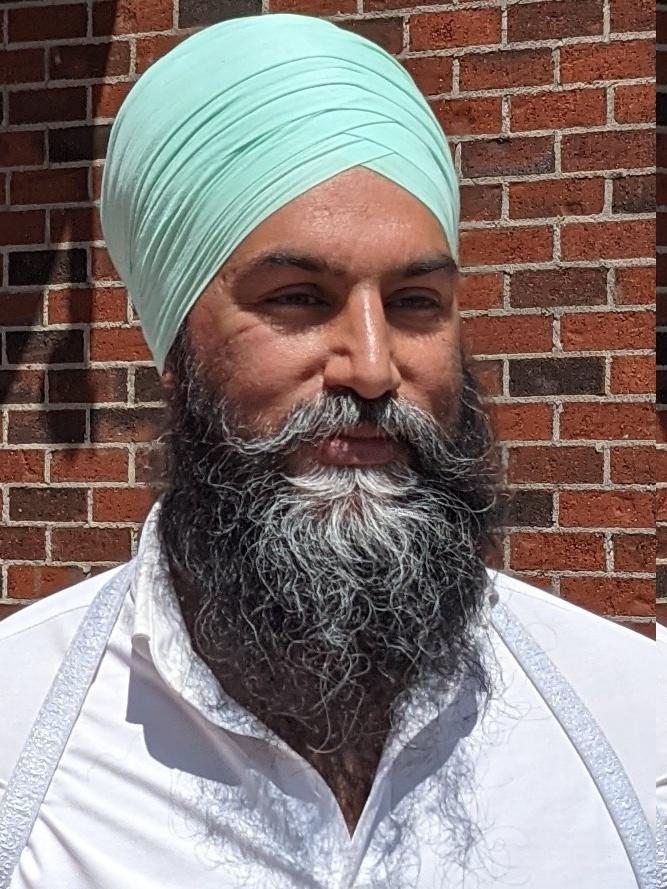

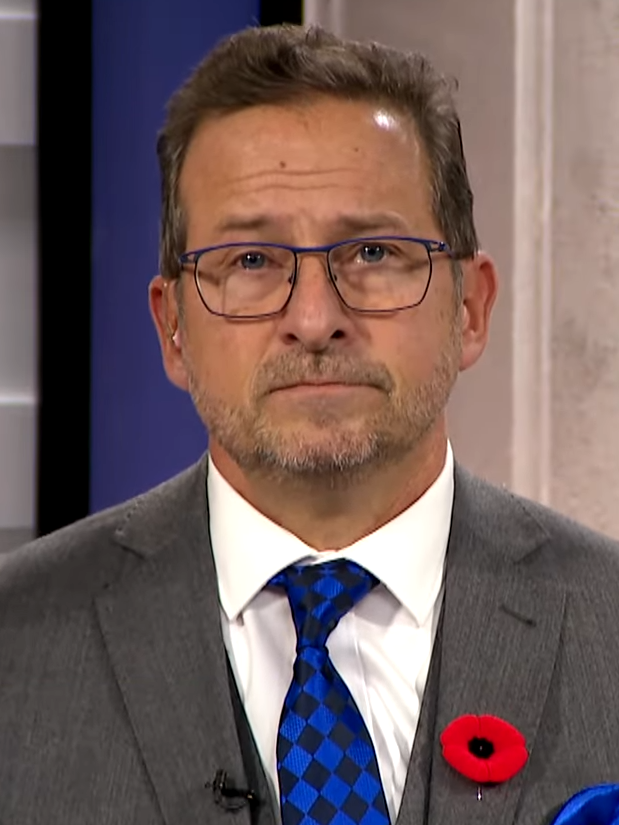
	First party	Second party
Leader	Pierre Poilievre	Justin Trudeau
Party	Conservative	Liberal
Leader since	September 10, 2022	April 14, 2013
Seats up	4	6
Seats won	6	3
Seat change	▲2	▼3
Popular vote	131,209	93,036
Percentage	42.23%	29.94%
Swing	▲6.58pp	▼3.56pp
	Third party	Fourth party
Leader	Jagmeet Singh	Yves-François Blanchet
Party	New Democratic	Bloc Québécois
Leader since	October 1, 2017	September 14, 2018
Seats up	1	0
Seats won	1	1
Seat change	Steady	▲1
Popular vote	48,884	9,910
Percentage	15.73%	3.19% (Note: 18.57% where running)
Swing	▼3.82pp	▲0.95pp (Note: ▲4.72pp where running)

By-elections to the 44th Canadian Parliament were held to fill vacancies in the House of Commons of Canada between the 2021 federal election and the 2025 federal election. The 44th Canadian Parliament began in 2021 with the membership of its House of Commons having been determined by the results of the 44th Canadian federal election held on September 20, 2021. The Liberal Party of Canada had a minority government during this Parliament, supported by the New Democratic Party in a (2022 to 2024) confidence-and-supply agreement. The Conservative Party of Canada forms the Official Opposition.

Eleven by-elections were held during the 44th Parliament. They took place in the following electoral districts:

- Mississauga—Lakeshore, following the resignation of Liberal MP Sven Spengemann to take on a role at the United Nations on May 27, 2022.
- Winnipeg South Centre, left vacant following the death of Liberal MP Jim Carr on December 12, 2022.
- Oxford, following the resignation of Conservative MP Dave MacKenzie on January 28, 2023.
- Portage—Lisgar, following the resignation of Conservative MP Candice Bergen on February 28, 2023.
- Notre-Dame-de-Grâce—Westmount, following the resignation of Liberal MP Marc Garneau on March 8, 2023.
- Calgary Heritage, following the resignation of Conservative MP Bob Benzen on December 31, 2022, to return to the private sector.
- Durham, following Conservative MP Erin O'Toole's resignation on August 1, 2023.
- Toronto—St. Paul's, following Liberal MP Carolyn Bennett's resignation on January 16, 2024.
- LaSalle—Émard—Verdun, following the resignation of Liberal MP David Lametti on February 1, 2024.
- Elmwood—Transcona, following the resignation of New Democratic MP Daniel Blaikie on March 31, 2024.
- Cloverdale—Langley City, following the resignation of Liberal MP John Aldag on May 27, 2024.

A by-election was called in the following electoral district, but was cancelled due to the 2025 Canadian federal election being called:

- Halifax, following the resignation of Liberal MP Andy Fillmore on August 31, 2024. The writ of election was dropped on March 2nd and Election Day would have been April 14, 2025, but a federal election was called before then.

Under the Parliament of Canada Act, no byelection is held if the vacancy occurs within 9 months of the fixed date for the next general election. The following seats became vacant in the nine-month period prior to the fixed election date of October 20, 2025 and remained vacant until Parliament was dissolved on March 23, 2025:

- Honoré-Mercier, following the resignation of Independent MP Pablo Rodriguez on January 20, 2025.
- Esquimalt—Saanich—Sooke, following the resignation of New Democratic MP Randall Garrison on January 30, 2025.
- Eglinton—Lawrence, following the resignation of Liberal MP Marco Mendicino on March 14, 2025.

== Summary ==
Analysis of byelections by turnout and vote share for winning candidate (vs 2021)
Riding and winning party			Turnout		Vote share for winning candidate	
Riding and winning party			%	Change (pp)	%	Change (pp)
Mississauga—Lakeshore	█ Liberal	Hold	27.76	-36.03	51.45	6.50
Winnipeg South Centre	█ Liberal	Hold	36.82	-32.79	55.49	9.94
Oxford	█ Conservative	Hold	39.81	-25.08	42.92	-4.13
Portage—Lisgar	█ Conservative	Hold	45.47	-20.27	64.95	12.43
Notre-Dame-de-Grâce—Westmount	█ Liberal	Hold	29.93	-32.63	50.87	-2.90
Calgary Heritage	█ Conservative	Hold	28.89	-37.00	65.63	7.98
Durham	█ Conservative	Hold	27.97	-33.32	57.44	11.04
Toronto—St. Paul's	█ Conservative	Gain	43.52	-21.96	42.11	16.81
LaSalle—Émard—Verdun	█ Bloc Québécois	Gain	39.56	-20.94	28.02	5.93
Elmwood—Transcona	█ New Democratic	Hold	39.16	-20.46	48.18	-1.51
Cloverdale—Langley City	█ Conservative	Gain	16.27	-44.58	66.30	30.20

== Overview ==
Electoral district	Date vacated	Date writ issued	By-election date	Previous incumbent	Party	Cause	Winner	Party	Retained
Mississauga—Lakeshore	May 27, 2022	November 6, 2022	December 12, 2022	Sven Spengemann	Liberal	Resigned to accept a position with the United Nations	Charles Sousa	Liberal	Yes
Winnipeg South Centre	December 12, 2022	May 14, 2023	June 19, 2023	Jim Carr	Liberal	Death (multiple myeloma and kidney failure)	Ben Carr	Liberal	Yes
Oxford	January 28, 2023	May 14, 2023	June 19, 2023	Dave MacKenzie	Conservative	Retirement	Arpan Khanna	Conservative	Yes
Portage—Lisgar	February 28, 2023	May 14, 2023	June 19, 2023	Candice Bergen	Conservative	Resignation	Branden Leslie	Conservative	Yes
Notre-Dame-de-Grâce—Westmount	March 8, 2023	May 14, 2023	June 19, 2023	Marc Garneau	Liberal	Retirement	Anna Gainey	Liberal	Yes
Calgary Heritage	December 31, 2022	June 18, 2023	July 24, 2023	Bob Benzen	Conservative	Resigned to return to the private sector	Shuvaloy Majumdar	Conservative	Yes
Durham	August 1, 2023	January 28, 2024	March 4, 2024	Erin O'Toole	Conservative	Resignation	Jamil Jivani	Conservative	Yes
Toronto—St. Paul's	January 16, 2024	May 19, 2024	June 24, 2024	Carolyn Bennett	Liberal	Resigned to accept appointment as Ambassador to Denmark	Don Stewart	Conservative	No
LaSalle—Émard—Verdun	February 1, 2024	July 28, 2024	September 16, 2024	David Lametti	Liberal	Resigned to join law firm	Louis-Philippe Sauvé	Bloc Québécois	No
Elmwood—Transcona	March 31, 2024	July 28, 2024	September 16, 2024	Daniel Blaikie	New Democratic	Resigned to work in Premier of Manitoba Wab Kinew's office	Leila Dance	New Democratic	Yes
Cloverdale—Langley City	May 27, 2024	November 10, 2024	December 16, 2024	John Aldag	Liberal	Resigned to run as the BC NDP candidate for Langley-Abbotsford in the 2024 British Columbia general election.	Tamara Jansen	Conservative	No

== December 12, 2022 by-election ==
=== Mississauga—Lakeshore ===
The riding of Mississauga—Lakeshore was vacated on May 27, 2022, following the resignation of Liberal MP Sven Spengemann to accept a position with the United Nations. Spengemann had represented the riding since 2015, when he defeated Conservative incumbent Stella Ambler.

Running for the Liberals was former MPP Charles Sousa, who represented the area provincially from 2007 to 2018 and previously served in the provincial cabinets of Dalton McGuinty and Kathleen Wynne, including as Minister of Finance from 2013 to 2018. Alex Crombie, a former Queen's Park staffer and son of Mississauga mayor Bonnie Crombie, was seen as a potential candidate prior to Sousa's nomination.

Running for the Conservatives was Ron Chhinzer, a police officer. Michael Ras, who finished second to Spengemann in 2021, considered running for the nomination before declining.

The NDP nominated Julia Cole, who ran for the seat's provincial counterpart in the provincial election earlier in the year, while running for the Greens was Mary Kidnew, a past president of the Hillcrest Ratepayers Association.

Rhinoceros Party leader Sébastien CoRhino contested the by-election. As well, the Rhinoceros Party organized a protest against the Trudeau government's abandonment of electoral reform in 2017 by running thirty-two independent candidates, breaking their own record for most candidates nominated in a single riding in Canada, previously set in the riding of Saint Boniface—Saint Vital in the 2021 Canadian federal election.

Canadian federal by-election, December 12, 2022: Mississauga—Lakeshore Resignation of Sven Spengemann
Party	Candidate	Votes	%	±%	Expenditures
Liberal	Charles Sousa	12,766	51.45	+6.50	
Conservative	Ron Chhinzer	9,215	37.14	-1.54	
New Democratic	Julia Kole	1,231	4.96	-4.79	
Green	Mary Kidnew	792	3.19	+0.94	
People's	Khaled Al-Sudani	293	1.18	-3.03	
Independent	Sean Carson	48	0.19	—	
Independent	Charles Currie	44	0.18	—	
Independent	Patrick Strzalkowski	38	0.15	—	
Independent	Peter House	31	0.12	—	
Independent	Mélodie Anderson	29	0.12	—	
Rhinoceros	Sébastien CoRhino	24	0.10	-0.07	
Independent	Conrad Lukawski	23	0.09	—	
Independent	Adam Smith	23	0.09	—	
Independent	Stephen Davis	21	0.08	—	
Independent	Marie-Hélène LeBel	17	0.07	—	
Independent	Eliana Rosenblum	17	0.07	—	
Independent	Myriam Beaulieu	16	0.06	—	
Independent	Roger Sherwood	14	0.06	—	
Independent	John The Engineer Turmel	14	0.06	—	
Independent	Jevin David Carroll	12	0.05	—	
Independent	Spencer Rocchi	12	0.05	—	
Independent	Tomas Szuchewycz	12	0.05	—	
Independent	Julie St-Amand	11	0.04	—	
Independent	Mark Dejewski	11	0.04	—	
Independent	Julian Selody	10	0.04	—	
Independent	Ben Teichman	10	0.04	—	
Independent	Mylène Bonneau	9	0.04	—	
Independent	Kerri Hildebrandt	9	0.04	—	
Independent	Line Bélanger	8	0.03	—	
Independent	Alexandra Engering	8	0.03	—	
Independent	Samuel Jubinville	8	0.03	—	
Independent	Jean-Denis Parent Boudreault	7	0.03	—	
Independent	Daniel Gagnon	7	0.03	—	
Independent	Darcy Justin Vanderwater	6	0.02	—	
Independent	Donovan Eckstrom	5	0.02	—	
Independent	Donald Gagnon	5	0.02	—	
Independent	Martin Acetaria Caesar Jubinville	3	0.01	—	
Independent	Ysack Dupont	2	0.01	—	
Independent	Pascal St-Amand	2	0.01	—	
Independent	Alain Lamontagne	1	0.00	—	
Total valid votes		24,814			
Total rejected ballots		135	0.54		
Turnout		24,949	27.76		
Eligible voters		89,863			
Liberal hold		Swing		+4.02	
Source: Elections Canada

==== Polling ====
Polling Firm	Last Date of Polling	Link	Liberal	Cons.	NDP	Green	PPC	Others	Undecided	Margin of Error^{[1]}	Sample Size^{[2]}	Polling Method^{[3]}
Mainstreet Research	October 27, 2022	PDF	38.6	35.5	6.0	4.1	1.1	1.5	13.2	±4.3 pp	521	IVR

== June 19, 2023 by-elections ==
=== Winnipeg South Centre ===
The riding of Winnipeg South Centre was vacated on December 12, 2022, following the death of Liberal MP and former cabinet minister Jim Carr. Carr had represented the riding since 2015, when he defeated Conservative incumbent Joyce Bateman, and had been battling multiple myeloma and kidney failure since 2019. Carr also defeated Bateman in rematches in 2019 and 2021.

Running for the Liberals was Carr's son Ben Carr, an educator and former staffer to Mélanie Joly. Winnipeg city councillor Sherri Rollins briefly ran for the nomination before withdrawing and throwing her support behind Carr.

The Conservatives nominated Damir Stipanovic, an air traffic controller and member of the Royal Canadian Air Force Reserve.

Running again after previously running in 2021 were NDP candidate Julia Riddell, a clinical psychologist, and Green candidate Doug Hemmerling, a local educator.

The Longest Ballot Committee chose Winnipeg South Centre as its target for this group of byelections; the group protests the first-past-the-post election method by registering large numbers of independents in one riding in an election or group of byelections.

Canadian federal by-election, June 19, 2023: Winnipeg South Centre Death of Jim Carr
Party	Candidate	Votes	%	±%
Liberal	Ben Carr	14,278	55.49	+9.94
Conservative	Damir Stipanovic	6,100	23.70	-4.11
New Democratic	Julia Riddell	3,778	14.68	-5.95
Green	Doug Hemmerling	698	2.71	-0.04
People's	Tylor Baer	324	1.26	-1.51
Rhinoceros	Sébastien CoRhino	55	0.21	
Independent	Tait Palsson	52	0.20	
Independent	Jevin David Carroll	36	0.14	
Independent	John Dale	29	0.11	
Independent	Glen MacDonald	27	0.10	
Independent	Connie Lukawski	24	0.09	
Independent	Paul Stewart	22	0.09	
Independent	Patrick Strzalkowski	19	0.07	
Independent	Mark Dejewski	18	0.07	
Independent	Stella Galas	16	0.06	
Independent	Demetrios Karavas	16	0.06	
Independent	Myriam Beaulieu	14	0.05	
Independent	Christopher Clacio	14	0.05	
Independent	Alain Bourgault	13	0.05	
Independent	Martin "Acetaria Caesar" Jubinville	13	0.05	
Independent	Krzysztof Krzywinski	13	0.05	
Independent	Alain Lamontagne	11	0.04	
Independent	Marie-Hélène LeBel	11	0.04	
Independent	Jordan Wong	11	0.04	
Independent	Line Bélanger	10	0.04	
Independent	Andrew Kozakewich	10	0.04	
Independent	Eliana Rosenblum	10	0.04	
Independent	Gerrit Dogger	9	0.03	
Independent	Julie St-Amand	9	0.03	
Independent	Alexandra Engering	8	0.03	
Independent	Anthony Hamel	8	0.03	
Independent	Darcy Justin Vanderwater	8	0.03	
Independent	Roger Sherwood	7	0.03	
Independent	Pascal St-Amand	7	0.03	
Independent	Dji-Pé Frazer	6	0.02	
Independent	Daniel Gagnon	6	0.02	
Independent	Spencer Rocchi	6	0.02	
Independent	Mário Stocco	6	0.02	
Independent	Manon Marie Lili Desbiens	5	0.02	
Independent	Ysack Émile Dupont	5	0.02	
Independent	Yusuf Nasihi	5	0.02	
Independent	Jaël Champagne Gareau	4	0.02	
Independent	Donovan Eckstrom	3	0.01	
Independent	Ryan Huard	2	0.01	
Independent	Lorant Polya	2	0.01	
Independent	Benjamin Teichman	2	0.01	
Independent	Gavin Vanderwater	2	0.01	
Independent	Saleh Waziruddin	1	0.00	
Total valid votes		25,733	99.52	
Total rejected ballots		125	0.48	-0.26
Turnout		25,858	36.82	-32.79
Eligible voters		70,230		
Liberal hold		Swing		+7.02
Source: Elections Canada

=== Oxford ===
The riding of Oxford was vacated on January 28, 2023, following the resignation of Conservative MP Dave MacKenzie, who had held the seat since 2004.

Arpan Khanna, the party's national outreach chair and 2019 candidate in Brampton North defeated Woodstock city-county councillor Deb Tait, MacKenzie's daughter and former ministerial staffer Rick Roth for the Conservative nomination. Gerrit Van Dorland, executive assistant to Cypress Hills—Grasslands MP Jeremy Patzer was running for the nomination until he was disqualified by the Conservatives over a dispute about whether he disclosed information to the party. In February 2023, MacKenzie accused the party of supporting Khanna, which he argues is a violation of the party nomination rules based on the Conservative's code of conduct, during the race.

Running for the Liberals is local realtor, former educator, and past Woodstock mayoral candidate David Hilderley. Citing concerns with the Conservative nomination process, previous MP Dave MacKenzie endorsed Hilderley in April 2023.

Western University professor Cody Groat defeated Matthew Chambers, the party candidate for the riding in the 2019 and 2021 elections for the NDP nomination.

Canadian federal by-election, June 19, 2023: Oxford Resignation of Dave MacKenzie
Party	Candidate	Votes	%	±%
Conservative	Arpan Khanna	16,688	42.92	-4.13
Liberal	David Hilderley	14,164	36.43	+15.90
New Democratic	Cody Groat	4,053	10.42	-7.86
Christian Heritage	John Markus	1,672	4.30	+3.53
People's	Wendy Martin	1,278	3.29	-7.36
Green	Cheryle Baker	854	2.20	-0.52
Independent	John The Engineer Turmel	171	0.44	
Total valid votes		38,880	99.38	
Total rejected ballots		243	0.62	+0.01
Turnout		39,123	39.81	-25.08
Eligible voters		98,270		
Conservative hold		Swing		-10.01
Source: Elections Canada

=== Portage—Lisgar ===
The riding of Portage—Lisgar was vacated on February 28, 2023, following the resignation of Conservative MP Candice Bergen. Bergen, a cabinet minister in the government of Stephen Harper and the interim leader of the Conservative Party and Leader of the Opposition from February to September 2022, had held the seat since 2008.

Bergen's former campaign manager Branden Leslie defeated Rejeanne Caron, the party's 2019 candidate in Saint Boniface—Saint Vital and 2021 candidate in Elmwood—Transcona; Winkler resident Don Cruickshank, Morden-Winkler MLA and former Progressive Conservative Party of Manitoba cabinet minister Cameron Friesen; and Lawrence Toet, the MP for Elmwood—Transcona from 2011 to 2015 for the Conservative nomination. Liz Reimer, a Progressive Conservative Party of Manitoba staffer and former assistant to Friesen, and Josh Okello were previously running for the nomination, however after Friesen announced his campaign they withdrew their bids in order to run for the Progressive Conservative nomination in Morden-Winkler.

Maxime Bernier, who is the former MP Beauce and the current leader of the People's Party of Canada, announced on May 12, 2023, that he would run for the seat.

The Liberals announced Kerry Smith as their candidate on May 13.

Canadian federal by-election, June 19, 2023: Portage—Lisgar Resignation of Candice Bergen
Party	Candidate	Votes	%	±%
Conservative	Branden Leslie	20,250	64.95	+12.43
People's	Max Bernier	5,352	17.16	−4.42
Liberal	Kerry Smith	2,666	8.55	−2.40
New Democratic	Lisa Tessier-Burch	2,208	7.08	−6.30
Green	Nicolas Geddert	704	2.26	–
Total valid votes		31,180	99.40	
Total rejected ballots		188	0.60	−0.15
Turnout		31,368	45.47	−20.77
Eligible voters		68,988		
Conservative hold		Swing		+8.42
Source: Elections Canada

=== Notre-Dame-de-Grâce—Westmount ===
The riding of Notre-Dame-de-Grâce—Westmount was vacated on March 8, 2023, following the resignation of Liberal MP Marc Garneau. Garneau, previously the Minister of Transport and Minister of Foreign Affairs in the government of Justin Trudeau, had held the seat since 2008.

Running for the Liberals is Anna Gainey, former president of the party and daughter of former Montreal Canadiens General Manager Bob Gainey. Gainey won the Liberal nomination on May 15, 2023, defeating Fred Headon, vice president and general counsel of Air Canada, and 2021 La Pointe-de-l'Île candidate Jonas Fadeu.

Human rights activist and Green Party deputy leader Jonathan Pedneault was announced as the party's candidate on May 15, 2023.

Canadian federal by-election, June 19, 2023: Notre-Dame-de-Grâce—Westmount Resignation of Marc Garneau
Party	Candidate	Votes	%	±%
Liberal	Anna Gainey	11,051	50.87	−2.90
New Democratic	Jean-François Filion	3,001	13.81	−5.39
Conservative	Mathew Kaminski	2,936	13.51	−0.55
Green	Jonathan Pedneault	2,922	13.45	+9.42
Bloc Québécois	Laurence Massey	985	4.53	−0.75
Centrist	Alex Trainman Montagano	510	2.35	
People's	Tiny Olinga	141	0.65	−2.64
Rhinoceros	Sean Carson	97	0.45	
Christian Heritage	Yves Gilbert	65	0.30	+0.17
No Affiliation (Note: Ardea is a member of the Communist League, an unregistered party; "No Affiliation" is EC's term for leaving the party affiliation blank on a candidate's registration form.)	Félix Vincent Ardea	18	0.08	
Total valid votes		21,726	99.25	
Total rejected ballots		165	0.75	−0.22
Turnout			29.93	−32.63
Eligible voters		73,152		
Liberal hold		Swing		+1.25
Source: Elections Canada

== July 24, 2023 by-election ==
=== Calgary Heritage ===
The riding of Calgary Heritage was vacated on December 31, 2022, following the October 20 announcement from Conservative MP Bob Benzen that he would resign his seat by the end of the year in order to return to the private sector. Benzen had held the seat since a 2017 by-election in which he was elected to replace former Prime Minister and former Conservative leader Stephen Harper. The by-election was called for July 24, 2023, following the conclusion of the 2023 Alberta general election.

Shuvaloy Majumdar, global director for Harper's international consulting firm Harper & Associates defeated former parliamentary staffer Quinn Heffron for the Conservative nomination. Elliot Weinstein was acclaimed as the candidate for the Liberal Party.

Canadian federal by-election, July 24, 2023: Calgary Heritage Resignation of Bob Benzen
Party	Candidate	Votes	%	±%	Expenditures
Conservative	Shuvaloy Majumdar	15,853	65.63	+7.97	$116,908.12
Liberal	Elliot Weinstein	3,465	14.34	–2.39	$72,324.59
New Democratic	Gurmit Bhachu	3,429	14.20	–3.21	$10,675.70
People's	Kelly Lorencz	656	2.72	–2.29	none listed
Green	Ravenmoon Crocker	407	1.68	+0.25	$2,523.51
Christian Heritage	Larry R. Heather	144	0.60	–	$4,107.07
Maverick	Dan Irving	131	0.54	–0.79	$12,547.04
No Affiliation	Donovan Eckstrom	71	0.29	–	none listed
Total valid votes/expense limit		24,156	99.76	–	$125,117.21
Total rejected ballots		57	0.24	–0.35	
Turnout		24,213	28.89	–37.29	
Eligible voters		83,799			
Conservative hold		Swing		+2.79	
Source: Elections Canada

== March 4, 2024 by-election ==
=== Durham ===
The riding of Durham, represented by former Conservative leader Erin O'Toole, was vacated on August 1, 2023, following his resignation and retirement from politics. O'Toole, who led the party from 2020 to 2022 and served as Minister of Veterans Affairs in the government of Stephen Harper, has held the seat since a 2012 by-election.

Jamil Jivani, conservative commentator and former president of the Canada Strong and Free Network, won the Conservative Party nomination, defeating Theresa Corless, a former Durham Catholic School Board chair.

Robert Rock, a Scugog township councillor, was acclaimed as the candidate for the Liberal Party. Rock previously sought the nomination for the Conservatives, but was not a contestant when the riding association chose its candidate.

The Rhinoceros Party announced its candidate on January 13.

On January 28, 2024, Prime Minister Trudeau announced that the by-election would be held on March 4, 2024.

Canadian federal by-election, March 4, 2024: Durham Resignation of Erin O'Toole
Party	Candidate	Votes	%	±%
Conservative	Jamil Jivani	18,610	57.44	+11.04
Liberal	Robert Rock	7,285	22.48	–7.44
New Democratic	Chris Borgia	3,363	10.38	–7.14
People's	Patricia Conlin	1,435	4.43	–1.07
Green	Kevin MacKenzie	698	2.15	
Independent	Pranay Gunti	374	1.15	
Centrist	Khalid Qureshi	336	1.04	
United	Grant Abraham	238	0.73	
Rhinoceros	Adam Smith	62	0.19	–0.03
Total valid votes		32,401		
Total rejected ballots				
Turnout		32,401	27.87	–33.32
Eligible voters		116,259		
Conservative hold		Swing		+9.24
Source: Elections Canada

== June 24, 2024 by-election ==
=== Toronto—St. Paul's ===
The riding of Toronto—St. Paul's was vacated on January 16, 2024, following the resignation of Liberal MP Carolyn Bennett. Bennett, most recently the Minister of Mental Health and Addictions and Associate Minister of Health in the government of Justin Trudeau, had held the seat since 1997.

Running for the Liberal nomination was Leslie Church, former chief of staff to Chrystia Freeland. She later received formal approval to run for Liberal nomination in Toronto—St. Paul's in April 2024. She ran against Emma Richardson, a senior advisor with Global Affairs Canada's United Nations division. The Liberal nomination was held on May 1 with Church winning the nomination.

Other prospective candidates for the Liberal nomination who declined to run, included former Toronto city councillor Josh Colle; former Ontario MPP Eric Hoskins, who represented the area provincially from 2009 to 2018 and previously served in the provincial cabinets of Dalton McGuinty and Kathleen Wynne, including as Minister of Health and Long-Term Care from 2014 to 2018; and Toronto city councillor Josh Matlow, who has represented the area municipally since 2010; Matlow ultimately decided not to run. With his riding set to merge with Scarborough Centre at the next election, Don Valley East MP Michael Coteau was seen as a potential candidate, in order to avoid a nomination battle with fellow Liberal MP Salma Zahid; Coteau ultimately declined to run.

The Rhinoceros Party announced that Sean Carson would be the candidate on January 13.

The Conservative Party nominated Don Stewart on January 24. He works for the Canadian Investment Regulatory Organization.

The NDP announced on April 17 that Amrit Parhar would be the candidate. She works as the Director of Programs at the Institute for Change Leaders, an organization that was founded by Toronto mayor, Olivia Chow. It was previously reported two days earlier by The Hill Times that MPP for Toronto—St. Paul's, Jill Andrew was considering seeking the nomination.

On May 17, the Centrist Party announced Ali Mohiuddin as their candidate.

On May 24, the Green Party announced that Christian Cullis, a constituent coordinator for Ward 11 city councillor Dianne Saxe, would be their candidate. Emma Richardson, who previously lost the Liberal nomination, also sought the Green Party nomination.

On May 28, the People's Party announced that Dennis Wilson would be their candidate.

The Longest Ballot Committee chose to target the riding, resulting in dozens of independent candidates on the ballot.

Canadian federal by-election, June 24, 2024: Toronto—St. Paul's Resignation of Carolyn Bennett
Party	Candidate	Votes	%	±%
Conservative	Don Stewart	15,565	42.11	+16.81
Liberal	Leslie Church	14,932	40.40	-8.82
New Democratic	Amrit Parhar	4,073	11.02	-5.81
Green	Christian Cullis	1,057	2.86	-3.13
People's	Dennis Wilson	238	0.64	-2.02
Independent	Jonathan Schachter	97	0.26	
Independent	Mário Stocco	82	0.22	
Marxist–Leninist	Meñico Turcotte	59	0.16	
Rhinoceros	Sean Carson	51	0.14	
Independent	Thibaud Mony	51	0.14	
Independent	Glen MacDonald	42	0.11	
Independent	Mélodie Anderson	39	0.11	
Independent	Demetrios Karavas	37	0.10	
No Affiliation	Stephen Davis	36	0.10	
Independent	Jordan Wong	31	0.08	
Marijuana	Danny Légaré	30	0.08	
Independent	Alex Banks	27	0.07	
Centrist	Ali Mohiuddin	26	0.07	
Independent	Jaël Champagne Gareau	23	0.06	
Independent	Michael Bednarski	18	0.05	
Independent	John Dale	18	0.05	
Independent	Pierre Larochelle	17	0.05	
Independent	Joshua Bram Hieu Pham	17	0.05	
Independent	Marie-Hélène LeBel	16	0.04	
Independent	Guillaume Paradis	16	0.04	
Independent	Daniel Andrew Graham	13	0.04	
Independent	Pierre Granger	13	0.04	
Independent	Julie St-Amand	13	0.04	
Independent	Loren Hicks	12	0.03	
Independent	Matéo Martin	12	0.03	
Independent	Blake Hamilton	11	0.03	
Independent	Line Bélanger	10	0.02	
Independent	Charles Currie	10	0.03	
Independent	Cory Deville	10	0.03	
Independent	Alexandra Engering	10	0.03	
Independent	Daniel Stuckless	10	0.03	
Independent	Erle Stanley Bowman	9	0.02	
Independent	Anthony Hamel	9	0.02	
Independent	Pascal St-Amand	9	0.02	
Independent	Sébastien CoRhino	8	0.02	
Independent	Mark Dejewski	8	0.02	
Independent	Daniel Gagnon	8	0.02	
Independent	Agnieszka Marszalek	8	0.02	
Independent	Olivier Renaud	8	0.02	
Independent	Patrick Strzalkowski	8	0.02	
Independent	Donald Gagnon	7	0.02	
Independent	Benjamin Teichman	7	0.02	
Independent	MarthaLee Aykroyd	6	0.02	
Independent	Myriam Beaulieu	6	0.02	
Independent	Kubera Desai	6	0.02	
Independent	Donovan Eckstrom	6	0.02	
Independent	Kevin Krisa	6	0.02	
Independent	Lorant Polya	6	0.02	
Independent	Roger Sherwood	6	0.02	
Independent	Elliot Wand	6	0.02	
Independent	Michal Wieczorek	6	0.02	
Independent	Maxime Boivin	5	0.01	
Independent	Martin Acetaria Caesar Jubinville	5	0.01	
Independent	Jean-Denis Parent Boudreault	4	0.01	
Independent	Léthycia-Félix Corriveau	4	0.01	
Independent	Ysack Dupont	4	0.01	
Independent	Dji-Pé Frazer	4	0.01	
Independent	Zornitsa Halacheva	4	0.01	
Independent	Alain Lamontagne	4	0.01	
Independent	Renée Lemieux	4	0.01	
Independent	Danimal Preston	4	0.01	
Independent	Spencer Rocchi	4	0.01	
Independent	Yogo Shimada	4	0.01	
Independent	Darcy Vanderwater	4	0.01	
Independent	Mylène Bonneau	3	0.01	
Independent	Guillaume Gagnier-Michel	3	0.01	
Independent	Kerri Hildebrandt	3	0.01	
Independent	Krzysztof Krzywinski	3	0.01	
Independent	Connie Lukawski	3	0.01	
Independent	Wallace Richard Rowat	3	0.01	
Independent	Gavin Vanderwater	3	0.01	
Independent	Alain Bourgault	2	0.01	
No Affiliation	Manon Marie Lili Desbiens	2	0.01	
Independent	Gerrit Dogger	2	0.01	
Independent	Samuel Ducharme	2	0.01	
Independent	Yusuf Kadir Nasihi	2	0.01	
Independent	Winston Neutel	2	0.01	
Independent	Jacques Saintonge	2	0.01	
Independent	Felix-Antoine Hamel	0	0.00	
Total valid votes		36,962		
Total rejected ballots				
Turnout			43.52	-21.96
Eligible voters		84,934		
Conservative gain from Liberal		Swing		+12.76

== September 16, 2024 by-elections ==
=== LaSalle—Émard—Verdun ===
The riding of LaSalle—Émard—Verdun was vacated on February 1, 2024, following the resignation of Liberal MP David Lametti. Lametti, who previously served as Minister of Justice and Attorney General in the government of Justin Trudeau, won the seat in 2015.

On July 19, Montreal city councillor Laura Palestini was selected by the Liberals as their candidate despite others seeking the nomination such as Eddy Kara, a political strategist, Christopher Baenninger, Quebec Liberal candidate in Sainte-Marie–Saint-Jacques in 2022 and Saint-Henri–Sainte-Anne in 2023, and Lori Morrison, Electoral Division 1 Commissioner of the Lester B. Pearson School Board.

On March 28, Craig Sauvé, independent city councillor for the district of Saint-Henri—Little-Burgundy—Pointe-Saint-Charles announced that he was standing for nomination for the New Democratic Party's candidate. He was officially nominated as the candidate on April 28.

On July 19, the Conservative Party announced that their candidate would be Louis Ialenti, a small business owner. He was previously the Conservative candidate for Saint-Léonard—Saint-Michel in 2021.

The Bloc Québécois candidate will be Louis-Philippe Sauvé, the communications and administration coordinator at the Institute for Research in Contemporary Economics.

Gregory Yablunovsky will be the PPC candidate. He was previously the party's candidate in Saint-Laurent in 2021 and La Prairie in 2019.

On May 27, it was announced that Jency Mercier had won the nomination race for the Green Party.

Alain Paquette will be the Christian Heritage Party candidate.

On July 17, the Rhinoceros Party announced that party leader Sébastien CoRhino would be the candidate.

The Longest Ballot Committee announced LaSalle—Émard—Verdun as their next target following the Toronto—St. Paul's byelection, changing the name on their X.com account to reflect this.

On August 14, the newly announced Canadian Future Party announced that its candidate would be business strategist and entrepreneur Mark Khoury.

Canadian federal by-election, September 16, 2024: LaSalle—Émard—Verdun Resignation of David Lametti
Party	Candidate	Votes	%	±%
Bloc Québécois	Louis-Philippe Sauvé	8,925	28.20	+6.11
Liberal	Laura Palestini	8,656	27.35	-15.58
New Democratic	Craig Sauvé	8,272	26.13	+6.77
Conservative	Louis Ialenti	3,641	11.50	+4.05
Green	Jency Mercier	557	1.76	-1.28
Independent	Tina Jiu Ru Zhu	198	0.63	–
People's	Gregory Yablunovsky	159	0.50	-2.88
Canadian Future	Mark Khoury	93	0.29	–
Rhinoceros	Sébastien CoRhino	67	0.21	–
Christian Heritage	Alain Paquette	55	0.17	–
Marijuana	Steve Berthelot	53	0.17	–
Independent	Lanna Palsson	48	0.15	–
Marxist–Leninist	Normand Chouinard	40	0.13	–
No Affiliation	Myriam Beaulieu	40	0.13	–
Independent	Line Bélanger	34	0.11	–
Independent	Marie-Hélène LeBel	30	0.09	–
Independent	Pierre Samson	29	0.09	–
Independent	Julie St-Amand	24	0.08	–
Independent	Laura Vegys	23	0.07	–
No Affiliation	Manon Marie Lili Desbiens	21	0.07	–
Independent	Alain Bourgault	21	0.07	–
Independent	Mark Moutter	20	0.06	–
Independent	Charles Lemieux	19	0.06	–
Independent	Peter Barry Clarke	19	0.06	–
Independent	Guillaume Paradis	19	0.06	–
Independent	Hans Armando Vargas	17	0.05	–
Independent	Felix-Antoine Hamel	17	0.05	–
Independent	Martin Croteau	17	0.05	–
Independent	Daniel Gagnon	17	0.05	–
Independent	Matéo Martin	16	0.05	–
Independent	Daniel St-Pierre	16	0.05	–
Independent	John "The Engineer" Turmel	16	0.05	–
Independent	Alex Banks	16	0.05	–
Independent	Agnieszka Marszalek	15	0.05	–
No Affiliation	Fang Hu	15	0.05	–
Independent	Nassim Barhoumi	15	0.05	–
Independent	Connie Lukawski	14	0.04	–
Independent	Alain Lamontagne	14	0.04	–
Independent	Marie-Eve Vermette	14	0.04	–
Independent	Glen MacDonald	14	0.04	–
Independent	Mylène Bonneau	14	0.04	–
Independent	Martin Acetaria Caesar Jubinville	13	0.04	–
Independent	Réal BatRhino Martel	13	0.04	–
Independent	Andrew Davidson	13	0.04	–
Independent	Ryan Huard	13	0.04	–
Independent	John Dale	12	0.04	–
Independent	John Francis O'Flynn	12	0.04	–
Independent	Jaël Champagne Gareau	12	0.04	–
Independent	Mário Stocco	12	0.04	–
Independent	Jacques-Eric Guy	12	0.04	–
Independent	Yusuf Nasihi	11	0.03	–
Independent	Antony George Ernest Marcil	11	0.03	–
Independent	Samuel Ducharme	11	0.03	–
Independent	Christian Baril	11	0.03	–
Independent	Alexandra Engering	11	0.03	–
Independent	Danny Légaré	10	0.03	–
Independent	Timothy Schoen	10	0.03	–
Independent	Marc Corriveau	10	0.03	–
Independent	Mark Dejewski	9	0.03	–
Independent	Krzysztof Krzywinski	9	0.03	–
Independent	Grayson Pollard	8	0.03	–
Independent	Michael Bednarski	8	0.03	–
Independent	Donovan Eckstrom	7	0.02	–
Independent	Lorant Polya	7	0.02	–
Independent	Judy D. Hill	7	0.02	–
Independent	Adam Smith	6	0.02	–
Independent	Jordan Wong	6	0.02	–
Independent	Jeani Boudreault	6	0.02	–
No Affiliation	Katy Le Rougetel	6	0.02	–
Independent	Elliot Wand	5	0.02	–
Independent	Darcy Justin Vanderwater	5	0.02	–
Independent	Gavin Vanderwater	5	0.02	–
Independent	Lajos Polya	5	0.02	–
Independent	Michael Skirzynski	5	0.02	–
Independent	Gerrit Dogger	4	0.01	–
Independent	Harout Manougian	4	0.01	–
Independent	Roger Sherwood	4	0.01	–
Independent	Spencer Rocchi	4	0.01	–
Independent	Patrick Strzalkowski	4	0.01	–
Independent	Anthony Hamel	3	0.01	–
Independent	Julian Selody	3	0.01	–
Independent	Erle Stanley Bowman	3	0.01	–
Independent	Dji-Pé Frazer	3	0.01	–
Independent	Benjamin Teichman	3	0.01	–
Independent	Winston Neutel	2	0.01	–
Independent	Blake Hamilton	2	0.01	–
Independent	Wallace Richard Rowat	1	0.00	–
Independent	Pascal St-Amand	1	0.00	–
Independent	David Erland	1	0.00	–
Independent	Daniel Stuckless	0	0.00	–
Independent	Ysack Dupont	0	0.00	–
Total valid votes		31,653	97.77	
Total rejected ballots		723	2.23	+0.09
Turnout		32,376	40.84	-19.75
Eligible voters		79,268		
Bloc Québécois gain from Liberal		Swing		+10.81
Source: Elections Canada

=== Elmwood—Transcona ===
The riding of Elmwood—Transcona was vacated on March 31, 2024, following the resignation of NDP MP Daniel Blaikie.

On May 22, Leila Dance, the executive director of the Transcona Business Improvement Zone won the NDP nomination over Leilani Esteban, the executive director of the Chalmers Neighbourhood Renewal Corporation.

On July 19, Conservative Party announced Colin Reynolds, a construction electrician as their candidate. Lawrence Toet, MP for Elmwood—Transcona, from 2011 to 2015 was considered a potential candidate for the Conservatives.

On July 25, the Liberal Party nominated Ian MacIntyre, a retired teacher and union leader.

Russ Wyatt, Winnipeg city councillor for Transcona, 2002 to 2018, and 2022 to present was pondering a run for either the NDP or the Conservatives. He said that he liked the NDP's domestic policies, but disliked their "woke nonsense," and he aligns with the Conservatives on international views and foreign policy. Ultimately, he decided not to run.

On July 2, the Green Party announced that Nic Geddert had won the nomination race to be their candidate.

The People's Party originally chose Byron Gryba as their candidate. However, the party later registered Sarah Couture as the candidate.

Canadian federal by-election, September 16, 2024: Elmwood—Transcona Resignation of Daniel Blaikie
Party	Candidate	Votes	%	±%
New Democratic	Leila Dance	13,597	48.18	-1.51
Conservative	Colin Reynolds	12,415	44.00	+15.87
Liberal	Ian MacIntyre	1,362	4.83	-9.92
Green	Nicolas Geddert	360	1.28	-0.34
People's	Sarah Couture	353	1.25	-4.57
Canadian Future	Zbig Strycharz	132	0.47	—
Total valid votes		28,219	99.62	
Total rejected ballots		107	0.38	
Turnout		28,326	39.16	-20.46
Eligible voters		72,325		
New Democratic hold		Swing		-8.73
Source: Elections Canada

== December 16, 2024 by-election ==
=== Cloverdale—Langley City ===
The riding of Cloverdale—Langley City was vacated on May 31, 2024, upon the resignation of Liberal MP John Aldag to successfully seek the BC NDP nomination for Langley-Abbotsford in the 2024 British Columbia general election.

Former MP Tamara Jansen, who defeated Aldag in 2019 before losing a rematch in 2021 was the Conservative candidate. She won the nomination on October 21, 2024.

Running for the PPC was Ian Kennedy, who was the candidate for the party in 2021 and 2019.

On November 10, 2024, the writ for the by-election was issued. The by-election was scheduled to be held on December 16, 2024. Nominations closed on November 25, 2024.

Canadian federal by-election, December 16, 2024: Cloverdale—Langley City Resignation of John Aldag
Party	Candidate	Votes	%	±%
Conservative	Tamara Jansen	9,936	66.23	+30.13
Liberal	Madison Fleischer	2,411	16.07	-23.13
New Democratic	Vanessa Sharma	1,879	12.52	-7.36
Green	Patrick McCutcheon	580	3.87	—
People's	Ian Kennedy	134	0.89	-3.92
Libertarian	Alex Joehl	62	0.41	—
Total valid votes		15,002		
Total rejected ballots		28	0.19	-0.76
Turnout		15,030	16.33	-44.52
Eligible voters		92,061		
Conservative gain from Liberal		Swing		+26.63
Source: Elections Canada

== Cancelled by-election ==
=== Halifax ===
The riding of Halifax was vacated on August 31, 2024, upon the resignation of Liberal MP Andy Fillmore who ran in the 2024 Halifax mayoral election.

On November 26, 2023, Lisa Roberts was nominated to represent the NDP in the next general election. She was the previous candidate for the NDP in Halifax in 2021 and is the former MLA for the provincial district of Halifax Needham, having held office from 2016 to 2021.

On October 3, 2024, The Conservative Party nominated Mark Boudreau as their candidate. He is the Director of Communications for the Government of Nova Scotia. He is also the Communications Chair for the Progressive Conservative Association of Nova Scotia. Also seeking the Conservative nomination was Rahul Tiwari.

Jonah Morgan was the PPC candidate. He replaced Kelsey Green, an earlier candidate who withdrew sometime before late February.

The Liberal Party announced Shannon Miedema as their candidate on March 1, 2025. She is the director of environment and climate change for Halifax Regional Municipality.

The Canadian Future Party announced Megan Harris as their candidate on March 19, 2025.

On March 2, 2025, a byelection was scheduled to he held on April 14, 2025. The by-election was cancelled on March 23, 2025 when the 2025 Canadian federal election was called for April 28, 2025.

== Other vacancies ==
=== Honoré-Mercier ===
The riding of Honoré-Mercier was vacated on January 20, 2025, upon the resignation of Liberal-turned-Independent MP Pablo Rodriguez to run in the 2025 Quebec Liberal Party leadership election. As the vacancy occurred within nine months of the fixed election date of October 20, 2025, the seat remained vacant until the dissolution of the 44th Parliament.

=== Esquimalt—Saanich—Sooke ===
The riding of Esquimalt—Saanich—Sooke was vacated on January 30, 2025, upon the resignation of New Democratic MP Randall Garrison. As the vacancy occurred within nine months of the fixed election date of October 20, 2025, the seat remained vacant until the dissolution of the 44th Parliament.

=== Eglinton—Lawrence ===
The riding of Eglinton—Lawrence was vacated on March 14, 2025, upon the resignation of Liberal MP Marco Mendicino. As the vacancy occurred within nine months of the fixed election date of October 20, 2025, the seat remained vacant until the dissolution of the 44th Parliament.
