= Claude Guay =

Canadian politician

Claude Guay MP

Parliamentary Secretary to the Minister of Energy and Natural Resources
- Incumbent
- Assumed office June 5, 2025 Serving with Corey Hogan
- Minister: Tim Hodgson
- Preceded by: Marc Serré

Member of Parliament for LaSalle—Émard—Verdun
- Incumbent
- Assumed office April 28, 2025
- Preceded by: Louis-Philippe Sauvé

Personal details
- Party: Liberal
- Website: claudeguay.liberal.ca

Claude Guay MP is a Canadian politician from the Liberal Party of Canada. He was elected Member of Parliament for LaSalle—Émard—Verdun in the 2025 Canadian federal election. He was previously IBM Canada president during the Phoenix pay system story.

He unseated Louis-Philippe Sauvé, who had been the Bloc Québécois MP since the September 2024 federal by-election.

At the time of the 2025 Canadian federal election, he lived in Westmount.

== Electoral record ==
2025 Canadian federal election: LaSalle—Émard—Verdun
Party	Candidate	Votes	%	±%	Expenditures
Liberal	Claude Guay	27,439	50.86	+7.44	$93,872.19
Bloc Québécois	Louis-Philippe Sauvé	11,467	21.25	−0.58	$40,010.41
Conservative	Zsolt Fischer	7,456	13.82	+6.19	$0.00
New Democratic	Craig Sauvé	5,587	10.36	−8.66	$90,508.24
Green	Bisma Ansari	1,298	2.41	–0.60	$19,799.94
People's	Gregory Yablunovsky	260	0.48	–2.93	$21.11
Rhinoceros	Frédéric Dénommé	169	0.31	N/A	$0.00
Communist	Manuel Johnson	136	0.25	−0.15	$0.00
Marxist–Leninist	Normand Chouinard	81	0.15	N/A	$0.00
Centrist	Fang Hu	60	0.11	N/A	$0.00
Total valid votes/expense limit		53,953	98.79	+0.90	$128,712.71
Total rejected ballots		662	1.21	–0.90	
Turnout		54,615	66.57	+6.29	
Eligible voters		82,042			
Liberal notional hold		Swing		+4.01	
Source: Elections Canada
