= Louis Ialenti =

Canadian politician

Louis Ialenti MNA

Member of the National Assembly for Vimont-Auteuil
- Incumbent
- Assumed office October 5, 2026
- Preceded by: Valérie Schmaltz

Personal details
- Party: Quebec Liberal Party
- Other political affiliations: Conservative Party of Canada
- Education: Bishop's University (BBA), Queensland University of Technology (MBus), University of Queensland (LLB), The College of Law (Australia) (GDLP), York University (Cert.)
- Occupation: Entrepreneur, lawyer, politician, teacher

Louis Ialenti is a Canadian politician who is a candidate for the National Assembly of Quebec for Vimont-Auteuil in the 2026 Quebec general election as a member of the Quebec Liberal Party.

== Election results ==
2026 Quebec general election: Vimont-Auteuil
** Preliminary results — Not yet official **
| Party | Candidate | Votes | % | ±% |
|---|---|---|---|---|
| Liberal | Louis Ialenti | 13,535 | 42.76 | |
| Parti Québécois | Amin Ouazragh-Marchand | 6,621 | 20.92 | |
| Conservative | Mackenley Raphael | 4,000 | 12.64 | |
| Coalition Avenir Québec | Valérie Schmaltz | 3,997 | 12.63 | |
| Québec solidaire | Stella Bourgon-Germain | 3,085 | 9.75 | |
| Green | Pierrette Kamning Nguendjong | 218 | 0.69 | |
| Parti nul | Chantale Bordeleau | 198 | 0.63 | |
| Total valid votes | | | | |
| Total rejected ballots | | | | |
| Turnout | | | 68.28 | |
| Electors on the lists | | | – | – |
| Liberal gain from Coalition Avenir Québec | | Swing | | + |
Source: Élections Québec

2025 Canadian federal election: Alfred-Pellan
| Party | Candidate | Votes | % | ±% | Expenditures |
|---|---|---|---|---|---|
| Liberal | Angelo Iacono | 32,934 | 54.59 | +6.88 | $105,955.22 |
| Conservative | Louis Ialenti | 12,671 | 21.00 | +7.72 | $35,682.26 |
| Bloc Québécois | Isabel Dion | 12,259 | 20.32 | -6.26 | $12,581.08 |
| New Democratic | Jordan Larochelle | 2,044 | 3.39 | -4.43 | $0.00 |
| People's | Ludovic Mbany | 423 | 0.70 | +0.36 | $0.00 |
| Total valid votes/expense limit | | 60,331 | 98.35 | – | $134,265.60 |
| Total rejected ballots | | 1,015 | 1.65 | | |
| Turnout | | 61,346 | 69.57 | | |
| Eligible voters | | 88,183 | | | |
| Liberal notional hold | | Swing | | -0.42 | |
Source: Elections Canada
Note: number of eligible voters does not include voting day registrations.

Canadian federal by-election, September 16, 2024: LaSalle—Émard—Verdun Resignation of David Lametti
| Party | Candidate | Votes | % | ±% |
|---|---|---|---|---|
| Bloc Québécois | Louis-Philippe Sauvé | 8,925 | 28.20 | +6.11 |
| Liberal | Laura Palestini | 8,656 | 27.35 | -15.58 |
| New Democratic | Craig Sauvé | 8,272 | 26.13 | +6.77 |
| Conservative | Louis Ialenti | 3,641 | 11.50 | +4.05 |
| Green | Jency Mercier | 557 | 1.76 | -1.28 |
| Independent | Tina Jiu Ru Zhu | 198 | 0.63 | – |
| People's | Gregory Yablunovsky | 159 | 0.50 | -2.88 |
| Canadian Future | Mark Khoury | 93 | 0.29 | – |
| Rhinoceros | Sébastien CoRhino | 67 | 0.21 | – |
| Christian Heritage | Alain Paquette | 55 | 0.17 | – |
| Marijuana | Steve Berthelot | 53 | 0.17 | – |
| Independent | Lanna Palsson | 48 | 0.15 | – |
| Marxist–Leninist | Normand Chouinard | 40 | 0.13 | – |
| No Affiliation | Myriam Beaulieu | 40 | 0.13 | – |
| Independent | Line Bélanger | 34 | 0.11 | – |
| Independent | Marie-Hélène LeBel | 30 | 0.09 | – |
| Independent | Pierre Samson | 29 | 0.09 | – |
| Independent | Julie St-Amand | 24 | 0.08 | – |
| Independent | Laura Vegys | 23 | 0.07 | – |
| No Affiliation | Manon Marie Lili Desbiens | 21 | 0.07 | – |
| Independent | Alain Bourgault | 21 | 0.07 | – |
| Independent | Mark Moutter | 20 | 0.06 | – |
| Independent | Charles Lemieux | 19 | 0.06 | – |
| Independent | Peter Barry Clarke | 19 | 0.06 | – |
| Independent | Guillaume Paradis | 19 | 0.06 | – |
| Independent | Hans Armando Vargas | 17 | 0.05 | – |
| Independent | Felix-Antoine Hamel | 17 | 0.05 | – |
| Independent | Martin Croteau | 17 | 0.05 | – |
| Independent | Daniel Gagnon | 17 | 0.05 | – |
| Independent | Matéo Martin | 16 | 0.05 | – |
| Independent | Daniel St-Pierre | 16 | 0.05 | – |
| Independent | John "The Engineer" Turmel | 16 | 0.05 | – |
| Independent | Alex Banks | 16 | 0.05 | – |
| Independent | Agnieszka Marszalek | 15 | 0.05 | – |
| No Affiliation | Fang Hu | 15 | 0.05 | – |
| Independent | Nassim Barhoumi | 15 | 0.05 | – |
| Independent | Connie Lukawski | 14 | 0.04 | – |
| Independent | Alain Lamontagne | 14 | 0.04 | – |
| Independent | Marie-Eve Vermette | 14 | 0.04 | – |
| Independent | Glen MacDonald | 14 | 0.04 | – |
| Independent | Mylène Bonneau | 14 | 0.04 | – |
| Independent | Martin Acetaria Caesar Jubinville | 13 | 0.04 | – |
| Independent | Réal BatRhino Martel | 13 | 0.04 | – |
| Independent | Andrew Davidson | 13 | 0.04 | – |
| Independent | Ryan Huard | 13 | 0.04 | – |
| Independent | John Dale | 12 | 0.04 | – |
| Independent | John Francis O'Flynn | 12 | 0.04 | – |
| Independent | Jaël Champagne Gareau | 12 | 0.04 | – |
| Independent | Mário Stocco | 12 | 0.04 | – |
| Independent | Jacques-Eric Guy | 12 | 0.04 | – |
| Independent | Yusuf Nasihi | 11 | 0.03 | – |
| Independent | Antony George Ernest Marcil | 11 | 0.03 | – |
| Independent | Samuel Ducharme | 11 | 0.03 | – |
| Independent | Christian Baril | 11 | 0.03 | – |
| Independent | Alexandra Engering | 11 | 0.03 | – |
| Independent | Danny Légaré | 10 | 0.03 | – |
| Independent | Timothy Schoen | 10 | 0.03 | – |
| Independent | Marc Corriveau | 10 | 0.03 | – |
| Independent | Mark Dejewski | 9 | 0.03 | – |
| Independent | Krzysztof Krzywinski | 9 | 0.03 | – |
| Independent | Grayson Pollard | 8 | 0.03 | – |
| Independent | Michael Bednarski | 8 | 0.03 | – |
| Independent | Donovan Eckstrom | 7 | 0.02 | – |
| Independent | Lorant Polya | 7 | 0.02 | – |
| Independent | Judy D. Hill | 7 | 0.02 | – |
| Independent | Adam Smith | 6 | 0.02 | – |
| Independent | Jordan Wong | 6 | 0.02 | – |
| Independent | Jeani Boudreault | 6 | 0.02 | – |
| No Affiliation | Katy Le Rougetel | 6 | 0.02 | – |
| Independent | Elliot Wand | 5 | 0.02 | – |
| Independent | Darcy Justin Vanderwater | 5 | 0.02 | – |
| Independent | Gavin Vanderwater | 5 | 0.02 | – |
| Independent | Lajos Polya | 5 | 0.02 | – |
| Independent | Michael Skirzynski | 5 | 0.02 | – |
| Independent | Gerrit Dogger | 4 | 0.01 | – |
| Independent | Harout Manougian | 4 | 0.01 | – |
| Independent | Roger Sherwood | 4 | 0.01 | – |
| Independent | Spencer Rocchi | 4 | 0.01 | – |
| Independent | Patrick Strzalkowski | 4 | 0.01 | – |
| Independent | Anthony Hamel | 3 | 0.01 | – |
| Independent | Julian Selody | 3 | 0.01 | – |
| Independent | Erle Stanley Bowman | 3 | 0.01 | – |
| Independent | Dji-Pé Frazer | 3 | 0.01 | – |
| Independent | Benjamin Teichman | 3 | 0.01 | – |
| Independent | Winston Neutel | 2 | 0.01 | – |
| Independent | Blake Hamilton | 2 | 0.01 | – |
| Independent | Wallace Richard Rowat | 1 | 0.00 | – |
| Independent | Pascal St-Amand | 1 | 0.00 | – |
| Independent | David Erland | 1 | 0.00 | – |
| Independent | Daniel Stuckless | 0 | 0.00 | – |
| Independent | Ysack Dupont | 0 | 0.00 | – |
| Total valid votes | | 31,653 | 97.77 | |
| Total rejected ballots | | 723 | 2.23 | +0.09 |
| Turnout | | 32,376 | 40.84 | -19.75 |
| Eligible voters | | 79,268 | | |
| Bloc Québécois gain from Liberal | | Swing | | +10.81 |
Source: Elections Canada

2021 Canadian federal election: Saint-Léonard—Saint-Michel
| Party | Candidate | Votes | % | ±% | Expenditures |
|---|---|---|---|---|---|
| Liberal | Patricia Lattanzio | 29,010 | 69.40 | +8.07 | $55,649.86 |
| Conservative | Louis Ialenti | 4,381 | 10.50 | -1.44 | $0.00 |
| New Democratic | Alicia Di Tullio | 3,460 | 8.30 | +1.78 | $1,225.49 |
| Bloc Québécois | Laurence Massey | 3,395 | 8.10 | -1.48 | $2,242.01 |
| People's | Daniele Ritacca | 1,568 | 3.70 | +2.60 | $386.31 |
| Total valid votes/expense limit | | 41,814 | 100.0 | | $108,432.19 |
| Total rejected ballots | | 890 | N/A | | |
| Turnout | | 42,704 | 56.45 | -3.93 | |
| Eligible voters | | 74,279 | | | |
| Liberal hold | | Swing | | +4.76 | |
Source: Elections Canada
