= Vimont-Auteuil =

Provincial electoral district in Quebec, Canada

Coordinates: 45.63°N 73.74°W

Quebec electoral district
- Location in Laval

Provincial electoral district
- Legislature: National Assembly of Quebec
MNA
Louis Ialenti
Liberal
- District created: 1980
- First contested: 1981
- Last contested: 2026

Demographics
- Population (2001): 67,502
- Electors (2012): 44,024
- Area (km²): 44.9
- Pop. density (per km²): 1,503.4
- Census division: Laval
- Census subdivision: Laval

Vimont-Auteuil (formerly Vimont; French pronunciation: [vimɔ̃ otœj]) is a provincial electoral district in the Laval region of Quebec, Canada, that elects members to the National Assembly of Quebec. It consists of part of the city of Laval.

It was created for the 1981 election from parts of Fabre and Mille-Îles electoral districts.

In the change from the 2001 to the 2011 electoral map, it lost much of its territory to the newly created Sainte-Rose electoral district, but gained some territory to the east from Mille-Îles.

== Members of the National Assembly ==
Legislature	Years	Member	Party
Riding created from Fabre and Mille-Îles
32nd	1981–1985	Jean-Guy Rodrigue	Parti Québécois
33rd	1985–1989	Jean-Paul Théorêt	Liberal
34th	1989–1994	Benoît Fradet	Liberal
35th	1994–1998	David Cliche	Parti Québécois
36th	1998–2002	David Cliche	Parti Québécois
36th	2002–2003	François Gaudreau	Action démocratique
37th	2003–2007	Vincent Auclair	Liberal
38th	2007–2008	Vincent Auclair	Liberal
39th	2008–2012	Vincent Auclair	Liberal
40th	2012–2014	Jean Rousselle	Liberal
41st	2014–2018	Jean Rousselle	Liberal
42nd	2018–2022	Jean Rousselle	Liberal
43rd	2022–2026	Valérie Schmaltz	Coalition Avenir Québec
Vimont-Auteuil
44th	2026–Present	Louis Ialenti	Liberal

== Election results ==
2026 Quebec general election
** Preliminary results — Not yet official **
Party	Candidate	Votes	%	±%
Liberal	Louis Ialenti	13,535	42.76	
Parti Québécois	Amin Ouazragh-Marchand	6,621	20.92	
Conservative	Mackenley Raphael	4,000	12.64	
Coalition Avenir Québec	Valérie Schmaltz	3,997	12.63	
Québec solidaire	Stella Bourgon-Germain	3,085	9.75	
Green	Pierrette Kamning Nguendjong	218	0.69	
Parti nul	Chantale Bordeleau	198	0.63	
Total valid votes				
Total rejected ballots				
Turnout			68.28	
Electors on the lists			–	–
Liberal gain from Coalition Avenir Québec		Swing		+
Source: Élections Québec

2022 Quebec general election: Vimont
Party	Candidate	Votes	%	±%
Coalition Avenir Québec	Valérie Schmaltz	10,957	34.28	-0.59
Liberal	Anabela Monteiro	9,541	29.85	-6.84
Conservative	Stefano Piscitelli	4,118	12.88	+11.95
Québec solidaire	Josée Bélanger	3,669	11.48	-0.04
Parti Québécois	Nathalie Lavigne	3,379	10.57	-1.82
Green	Rita Lo Cicero	301	0.94	-1.14
Total valid votes		31,965	98.92	
Total rejected ballots		349	1.08	-0.39
Turnout		32,314	69.97	+0.82
Electors on the lists		46,185		
Coalition Avenir Québec gain from Liberal		Swing		+3.12

2018 Quebec general election: Vimont
Party	Candidate	Votes	%	±%
Liberal	Jean Rousselle	11,474	36.69	-13.79
Coalition Avenir Québec	Michel Reeves	10,907	34.87	+15.84
Parti Québécois	Sylvie Moreau	3,875	12.39	-11.03
Québec solidaire	Caroline Trottier-Gascon	3,602	11.52	+6.71
Green	Mélanie Messier	652	2.08	+1.02
Conservative	Rachel Landerman	291	0.93	+0.63
New Democratic	Andriana Kocini	230	0.74	
Citoyens au pouvoir	Rachel Demers	131	0.42	
Independent	Jean-Marc Boyer	115	0.37	+0.03
Total valid votes		31,277	98.53	
Total rejected ballots		467	1.47	+0.21
Turnout		31,744	69.15	-14.81
Eligible voters		45,909		
Liberal hold		Swing		-14.81
Source(s) "Rapport des résultats officiels du scrutin". Élections Québec.

2014 Quebec general election
Party	Candidate	Votes	%	±%
Liberal	Jean Rousselle	17,584	50.48	+13.00
Parti Québécois	Jean Poirier	8,160	23.42	-7.10
Coalition Avenir Québec	Joseph Dydzak	6,632	19.04	-5.64
Québec solidaire	Janina Moran	1,676	4.81	-0.84
Green	Andréanne Demers	372	1.07	–
Option nationale	Étienne Boily	192	0.55	-1.44
Independent	Jean-Marc Boyer	117	0.34	-0.39
Conservative	Alain Robert	104	0.30	-0.33
Total valid votes		34,837	98.74	–
Total rejected ballots		445	1.26	–
Turnout		35,282	78.48	–
Electors on the lists		44,955	–	–
Liberal hold		Swing		+10.05

2014 Elections Quebec reference:

2012 Quebec general election
Party	Candidate	Votes	%	±%
Liberal	Jean Rousselle	12,973	37.48	-10.87
Parti Québécois	Linda Tousignant	10,564	30.52	-4.57
Coalition Avenir Québec	Christopher Skeete	8,544	24.68	+13.17
Québec solidaire	David Lanneville	1,373	3.97	+0.17
Option nationale	Catherine Houbart	688	1.99	–
Independent	Jean-Marc Boyer	253	0.73	–
Conservative	Alain Robert	219	0.63	–
Total valid votes		34,614	98.88	–
Total rejected ballots		393	1.12	–
Turnout		35,007	79.34	–
Electors on the lists		44,122	–	–
Liberal hold		Swing		-3.15

^ Change is from redistributed results. CAQ change is from ADQ.

2008 Quebec general election
Party	Candidate	Votes	%	±%
Liberal	Vincent Auclair	16,217	47.78	+11.81
Parti Québécois	Rachel Demers	12,257	36.11	+9.10
Action démocratique	Pierre Brien	3,932	11.58	-19.48
Québec solidaire	Audrey Boisvert	1,537	4.53	+2.43

2007 Quebec general election
Party	Candidate	Votes	%	±%
Liberal	Vincent Auclair	14,936	35.97	-10.34
Action démocratique	François Gaudreau	12,898	31.06	+12.37
Parti Québécois	Marie-France Charbonneau	11,215	27.01	-6.26
Green	Catherine Ouellet-Cummings	1,606	3.87	+2.83
Québec solidaire	Mickael Labrie	871	2.10	+1.40*

* Increase is from UFP

2003 Quebec general election
Party	Candidate	Votes	%	±%
Liberal	Vincent Auclair	17,908	46.31	+13.14
Parti Québécois	Normand Dupont	12,865	33.27	+17.13
Action démocratique	François Gaudreau	7,227	18.69	-31.31
Green	Serge Légaré	403	1.04	-
UFP	André Pigeon	269	0.70	-

Vimont by-election, June 17, 2002
Party	Candidate	Votes	%	±%
Action démocratique	François Gaudreau	15,236	50.00	+37.85
Liberal	Vincent Auclair	10,109	33.17	-8.20
Parti Québécois	Manon Sauvé	4,918	16.14	-29.25
Independent	Régent Millette	212	0.70	-

1998 Quebec general election
Party	Candidate	Votes	%	±%
Parti Québécois	David Cliche	20,938	45.39	+0.51
Liberal	François Macerola	19,085	41.37	-3.21
Action démocratique	François Gaudreau	5,604	12.15	+5.57
Bloc Pot	David Ferron	292	0.63	-
Socialist Democracy	Martin Duplantis	215	0.47	-2.23

1995 Quebec referendum
Side	Votes	%
Oui	24,548	50.01
Non	24,542	49.99

== See also ==
- List of Quebec provincial electoral districts
- Canadian provincial electoral districts
