= 2024 LaSalle—Émard—Verdun federal by-election =

Federal by-election in Quebec, Canada

2024 LaSalle—Émard—Verdun by-election
- September 16, 2024

Riding of LaSalle—Émard—Verdun
- Turnout: 39.66% (▼20.94)
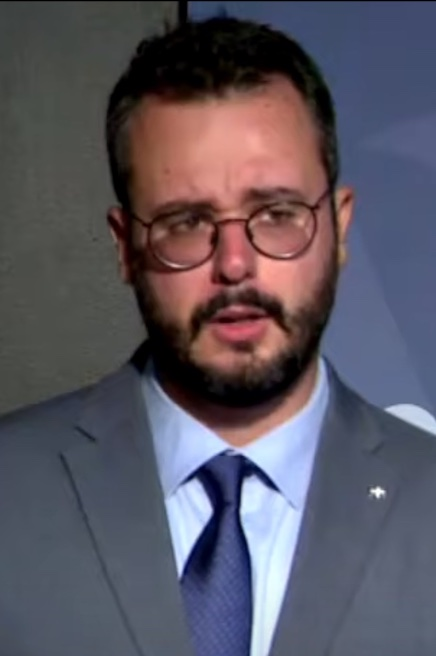

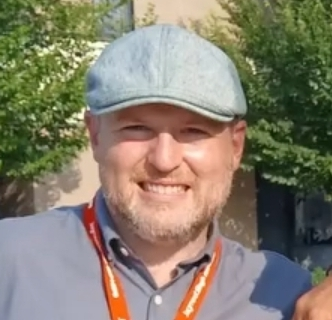
	First party	Second party
		LPC
Candidate	Louis-Philippe Sauvé	Laura Palestini
Party	Bloc Québécois	Liberal
Popular vote	8,884	8,636
Percentage	28.02%	27.23%
Swing	▲5.93 pp	▼15.69 pp
	Third party	Fourth party
		CPC
Candidate	Craig Sauvé	Louis Ialenti
Party	New Democratic	Conservative
Popular vote	8,262	3,676
Percentage	26.05%	11.59%
Swing	▲6.70 pp	▲4.14 pp
- LaSalle-Emard-Verdun By-Election Results
MP before election
David Lametti
Liberal
Elected MP
Louis-Philippe Sauvé
Bloc Québécois

A by-election was held in the federal riding of LaSalle—Émard—Verdun in Quebec, Canada, on September 16, 2024, following the resignation of incumbent Liberal MP David Lametti.

While the riding was considered a "stronghold" for the Liberals, the by-election was expected by some to be a close race between the Liberals and the NDP, who ran "well known" Montreal city councillor Craig Sauvé. The by-election was expected to be a three-way marginal with the Bloc Québécois also having strong support in the riding.

The by-election was held on the same day as one in Elmwood—Transcona in Manitoba and was considered a test for the government of Justin Trudeau. After results were announced, Trudeau said that his party had "a lot of work to do".

== Background ==
The riding of LaSalle—Émard—Verdun was vacated on February 1, 2024, following the resignation of Liberal MP David Lametti. Lametti, who previously served as Minister of Justice and Attorney General in the government of Justin Trudeau, won the seat in 2015.

=== Constituency ===
The constituency is an urban Francophone riding located in the southwestern part of Montreal containing parts of the boroughs of Le Sud-Ouest, Verdun and LaSalle. The riding has been held by the Liberals since its creation in 2015. Prior to 2015, this area of the city was split into two different ridings, with Verdun being in one riding (Jeanne-Le Ber from 2004 to 2016) and the LaSalle and Ville-Émard areas being in another (LaSalle—Émard from 1988 to 2015). Both ridings went NDP during the "orange wave" of the 2011 Canadian federal election. Prior to 2011, the LaSalle—Émard area has been reliably Liberal, while Verdun has been less-so, with the Bloc holding it from 2006 to 2011.

=== Candidates ===
The total of 91 candidates broke the record for the longest list of candidates in a federal by-election, besting the 84 that ran in the 2024 Toronto—St. Paul's federal by-election, both results being attributed to the Longest Ballot Committee, an organization protesting the first-past-the-post electoral system. It was equalled in Carleton during the 2025 Canadian federal election, and surpassed only by the 2025 Battle River—Crowfoot federal by-election (which used a special ballot instead of a large ballot).

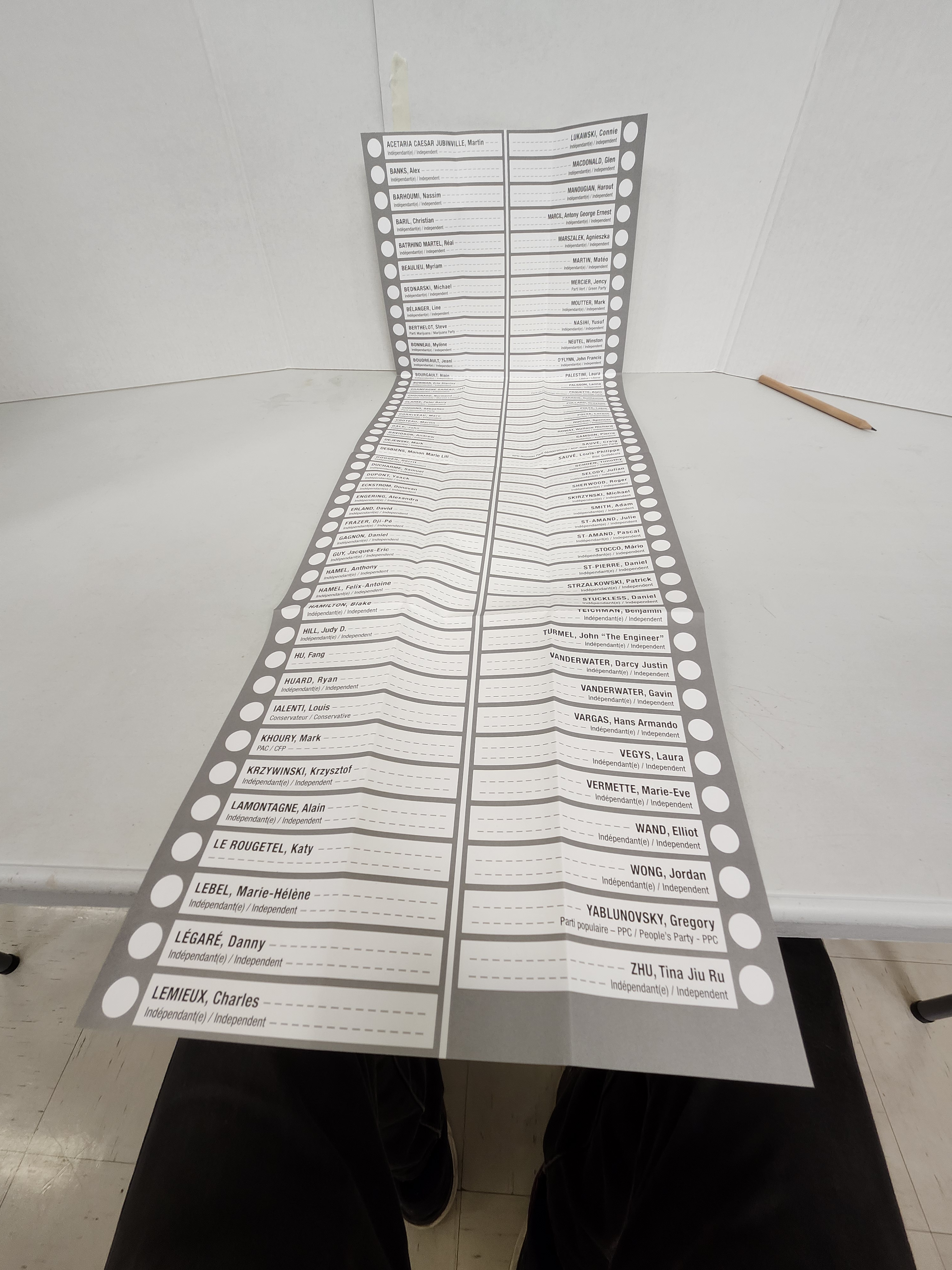
Ballot comprising 91 candidates

On July 19, Montreal city councillor Laura Palestini was selected by the Liberals as their candidate over others seeking the nomination such as Eddy Kara, a political strategist, Christopher Baenninger, Quebec Liberal candidate in Sainte-Marie–Saint-Jacques in 2022 and Saint-Henri–Sainte-Anne in 2023, and Lori Morrison, Electoral Division 1 Commissioner of the Lester B. Pearson School Board. The party approached Charles Milliard, president of the Fédération des chambres de commerce du Québec, to run as their candidate in the by-election. He ultimately declined to run, preferring running in the 2025 Quebec Liberal Party leadership election.

On March 28, Craig Sauvé, independent city councillor for the district of Saint-Henri—Little-Burgundy—Pointe-Saint-Charles announced that he was standing for nomination for the New Democratic Party's candidate. He was officially nominated as the NDP candidate on April 28.

On July 19, the Conservative Party announced that their candidate would be Louis Ialenti, a small business owner. He was previously the Conservative candidate for Saint-Léonard—Saint-Michel in 2021.

The Bloc Québécois candidate was Louis-Philippe Sauvé, a party staffer and the former communications and administration coordinator at the Institute for Research in Contemporary Economics.

Gregory Yablunovsky was the PPC candidate. He was previously the party's candidate in Saint-Laurent in 2021 and La Prairie in 2019.

On May 27, it was announced that Jency Mercier had won the nomination race for the Green Party.

Alain Paquette was the Christian Heritage Party candidate.

On July 17, the Rhinoceros Party announced that party leader Sébastien CoRhino would be the candidate.

The Longest Ballot Committee targeted the LaSalle—Émard—Verdun by-election resulting in 77 independent candidates affiliated to the organization running in this riding.

On August 14, the newly formed Canadian Future Party announced Mark Khoury as their candidate in the election.

== Campaign ==
It was reported that Liberal campaign materials omitted the image of Justin Trudeau, unlike other parties which used their party leader's picture. The unpopularity of the federal government has been a consideration. Senior Liberal figures considered the by-election a "must-win".

== Opinion polls ==
Polling Firm	Last Date of Polling	Link	LPC	BQ	NDP	CPC	PPC	Green	Margin of Error^{[1]}	Sample Size^{[2]}	Polling Method^{[3]}
Mainstreet Research	September 7-9, 2024		24.1	29.6	23.0	7.3	—N/a	—N/a	±4.7 pp	443	IVR
Mainstreet Research	July 9, 2024		29	26	25	14	1	3	±5.4 pp	329	IVR
Election 2021	September 20, 2021		42.93	22.09	19.36	7.45	3.38	3.04	—	47,360	—

== Results ==
11,000 people voted in advance polling.

Canadian federal by-election, September 16, 2024: LaSalle—Émard—Verdun Resignation of David Lametti
Party	Candidate	Votes	%	±%
Bloc Québécois	Louis-Philippe Sauvé	8,925	28.20	+6.11
Liberal	Laura Palestini	8,656	27.35	-15.58
New Democratic	Craig Sauvé	8,272	26.13	+6.77
Conservative	Louis Ialenti	3,641	11.50	+4.05
Green	Jency Mercier	557	1.76	-1.28
Independent	Tina Jiu Ru Zhu	198	0.63	–
People's	Gregory Yablunovsky	159	0.50	-2.88
Canadian Future	Mark Khoury	93	0.29	–
Rhinoceros	Sébastien CoRhino	67	0.21	–
Christian Heritage	Alain Paquette	55	0.17	–
Marijuana	Steve Berthelot	53	0.17	–
Independent	Lanna Palsson	48	0.15	–
Marxist–Leninist	Normand Chouinard	40	0.13	–
No Affiliation	Myriam Beaulieu	40	0.13	–
Independent	Line Bélanger	34	0.11	–
Independent	Marie-Hélène LeBel	30	0.09	–
Independent	Pierre Samson	29	0.09	–
Independent	Julie St-Amand	24	0.08	–
Independent	Laura Vegys	23	0.07	–
No Affiliation	Manon Marie Lili Desbiens	21	0.07	–
Independent	Alain Bourgault	21	0.07	–
Independent	Mark Moutter	20	0.06	–
Independent	Charles Lemieux	19	0.06	–
Independent	Peter Barry Clarke	19	0.06	–
Independent	Guillaume Paradis	19	0.06	–
Independent	Hans Armando Vargas	17	0.05	–
Independent	Felix-Antoine Hamel	17	0.05	–
Independent	Martin Croteau	17	0.05	–
Independent	Daniel Gagnon	17	0.05	–
Independent	Matéo Martin	16	0.05	–
Independent	Daniel St-Pierre	16	0.05	–
Independent	John "The Engineer" Turmel	16	0.05	–
Independent	Alex Banks	16	0.05	–
Independent	Agnieszka Marszalek	15	0.05	–
No Affiliation	Fang Hu	15	0.05	–
Independent	Nassim Barhoumi	15	0.05	–
Independent	Connie Lukawski	14	0.04	–
Independent	Alain Lamontagne	14	0.04	–
Independent	Marie-Eve Vermette	14	0.04	–
Independent	Glen MacDonald	14	0.04	–
Independent	Mylène Bonneau	14	0.04	–
Independent	Martin Acetaria Caesar Jubinville	13	0.04	–
Independent	Réal BatRhino Martel	13	0.04	–
Independent	Andrew Davidson	13	0.04	–
Independent	Ryan Huard	13	0.04	–
Independent	John Dale	12	0.04	–
Independent	John Francis O'Flynn	12	0.04	–
Independent	Jaël Champagne Gareau	12	0.04	–
Independent	Mário Stocco	12	0.04	–
Independent	Jacques-Eric Guy	12	0.04	–
Independent	Yusuf Nasihi	11	0.03	–
Independent	Antony George Ernest Marcil	11	0.03	–
Independent	Samuel Ducharme	11	0.03	–
Independent	Christian Baril	11	0.03	–
Independent	Alexandra Engering	11	0.03	–
Independent	Danny Légaré	10	0.03	–
Independent	Timothy Schoen	10	0.03	–
Independent	Marc Corriveau	10	0.03	–
Independent	Mark Dejewski	9	0.03	–
Independent	Krzysztof Krzywinski	9	0.03	–
Independent	Grayson Pollard	8	0.03	–
Independent	Michael Bednarski	8	0.03	–
Independent	Donovan Eckstrom	7	0.02	–
Independent	Lorant Polya	7	0.02	–
Independent	Judy D. Hill	7	0.02	–
Independent	Adam Smith	6	0.02	–
Independent	Jordan Wong	6	0.02	–
Independent	Jeani Boudreault	6	0.02	–
No Affiliation	Katy Le Rougetel	6	0.02	–
Independent	Elliot Wand	5	0.02	–
Independent	Darcy Justin Vanderwater	5	0.02	–
Independent	Gavin Vanderwater	5	0.02	–
Independent	Lajos Polya	5	0.02	–
Independent	Michael Skirzynski	5	0.02	–
Independent	Gerrit Dogger	4	0.01	–
Independent	Harout Manougian	4	0.01	–
Independent	Roger Sherwood	4	0.01	–
Independent	Spencer Rocchi	4	0.01	–
Independent	Patrick Strzalkowski	4	0.01	–
Independent	Anthony Hamel	3	0.01	–
Independent	Julian Selody	3	0.01	–
Independent	Erle Stanley Bowman	3	0.01	–
Independent	Dji-Pé Frazer	3	0.01	–
Independent	Benjamin Teichman	3	0.01	–
Independent	Winston Neutel	2	0.01	–
Independent	Blake Hamilton	2	0.01	–
Independent	Wallace Richard Rowat	1	0.00	–
Independent	Pascal St-Amand	1	0.00	–
Independent	David Erland	1	0.00	–
Independent	Daniel Stuckless	0	0.00	–
Independent	Ysack Dupont	0	0.00	–
Total valid votes		31,653	97.77	
Total rejected ballots		723	2.23	+0.09
Turnout		32,376	40.84	-19.75
Eligible voters		79,268		
Bloc Québécois gain from Liberal		Swing		+10.81
Source: Elections Canada

== 2021 results ==
2021 Canadian federal election: LaSalle—Émard—Verdun
Party	Candidate	Votes	%	±%	Expenditures
Liberal	David Lametti	20,330	42.93	-0.60	$55,842.59
Bloc Québécois	Raphaël Guérard	10,461	22.09	-2.00	$9,992.28
New Democratic	Jason De Lierre	9,168	19.36	+2.89	$2,674.57
Conservative	Janina Moran	3,530	7.45	+0.41	$714.88
People's	Michel Walsh	1,600	3.38	+2.44	$2,295.27
Green	Sarah Carter	1,439	3.04	-3.80	$0.00
Free	Pascal Antonin	636	1.34	N/A	$2.73
Communist	J.P. Fortin	196	0.41	N/A	$0.00
Total valid votes/expense limit		47,360	97.86	–	$110,554.58
Total rejected ballots		1,036	2.14	+0.52	
Turnout		48,396	60.59	-3.78	
Registered voters		79,869			
Liberal hold		Swing		+0.70	
Source: Elections Canada

== See also ==
- By-elections to the 44th Canadian Parliament
- 2024 Elmwood—Transcona federal by-election
