= Valérie Schmaltz =

Canadian politician

Member of the National Assembly of Quebec for Vimont
- In office October 3, 2022 – August 27, 2026
- Preceded by: Jean Rousselle
- Succeeded by: Louis Ialenti

Personal details
- Born: Strasbourg, France
- Party: Coalition Avenir Québec

Valérie Schmaltz is a Canadian politician, who was elected to the National Assembly of Quebec in the 2022 Quebec general election. She represented the riding of Vimont as a member of the Coalition Avenir Québec.

== Electoral record ==
2026 Quebec general election: Vimont-Auteuil
** Preliminary results — Not yet official **
Party	Candidate	Votes	%	±%
Liberal	Louis Ialenti	13,535	42.76	
Parti Québécois	Amin Ouazragh-Marchand	6,621	20.92	
Conservative	Mackenley Raphael	4,000	12.64	
Coalition Avenir Québec	Valérie Schmaltz	3,997	12.63	
Québec solidaire	Stella Bourgon-Germain	3,085	9.75	
Green	Pierrette Kamning Nguendjong	218	0.69	
Parti nul	Chantale Bordeleau	198	0.63	
Total valid votes				
Total rejected ballots				
Turnout			68.28	
Electors on the lists			–	–
Liberal gain from Coalition Avenir Québec		Swing		+
Source: Élections Québec

2022 Quebec general election: Vimont
Party	Candidate	Votes	%	±%
Coalition Avenir Québec	Valérie Schmaltz	10,957	34.28	-0.59
Liberal	Anabela Monteiro	9,541	29.85	-6.84
Conservative	Stefano Piscitelli	4,118	12.88	+11.95
Québec solidaire	Josée Bélanger	3,669	11.48	-0.04
Parti Québécois	Nathalie Lavigne	3,379	10.57	-1.82
Green	Rita Lo Cicero	301	0.94	-1.14
Total valid votes		31,965	98.92	
Total rejected ballots		349	1.08	-0.39
Turnout		32,314	69.97	+0.82
Electors on the lists		46,185		
Coalition Avenir Québec gain from Liberal		Swing		+3.12
