= Vincent Auclair =

Canadian politician and notary

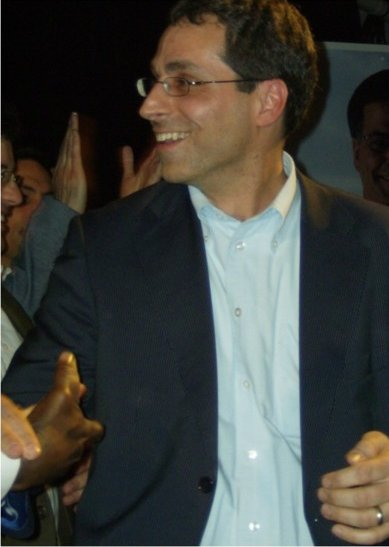

MNA for Vimont
- In office May 21, 2003 – 2012
- Preceded by: François Gaudreau
- Succeeded by: Jean Rousselle

Personal details
- Born: August 9, 1965 (age 60) Laval, Quebec, Canada
- Party: Quebec Liberal Party
- Spouse: Suzie Lalancette
- Profession: Notary
- Portfolio: Municipal and Regional Affairs

Vincent Auclair (born August 9, 1965, in Laval, Quebec) is a Canadian politician and notary. He was the Member of National Assembly of Quebec for the riding of Vimont in the Laval region from 2003 to 2012. He is a member of the Quebec Liberal Party and Parliamentary Secretary to the Minister of Municipal Affairs and Regions and to the Deputy Prime Minister.

Auclair went to the Université de Montréal and obtained a bachelor's degree in economics before studying at the University of Ottawa in which he obtained a license and diploma in law. He was then a notary for nearly 10 years.

Auclair entered politics in 2002 when he was Liberal candidate for Vimont in a by-election but lost to the Action démocratique du Québec. However, in the 2003 elections, he was elected the MNA and named the parliamentary secretary to the minister of employment, social solidarity and family from 2003 and 2005 and parliamentary secretary to the minister of municipal affairs from 2005 to today. He was re-elected for a second term in 2007.
