= Jean Rousselle =

Canadian politician (born 1953)

Member of the National Assembly of Quebec for Vimont
- In office September 4, 2012 – August 28, 2022
- Preceded by: Vincent Auclair
- Succeeded by: Valérie Schmaltz

Personal details
- Born: 18 April 1953 (age 73) Montreal, Quebec, Canada
- Party: Liberal

Jean Rousselle (born 18 April 1953) is a Canadian politician, who was member of the National Assembly of Quebec from 2012 to 2022. First elected in the 2012 election, he represented the riding of Vimont as a member of the Quebec Liberal Party.

== Election results ==
2014 Quebec general election
Party	Candidate	Votes	%	±%
Liberal	Jean Rousselle	17,584	50.48	+13.00
Parti Québécois	Jean Poirier	8,160	23.42	-7.10
Coalition Avenir Québec	Joseph Dydzak	6,632	19.04	-5.64
Québec solidaire	Janina Moran	1,676	4.81	-0.84
Green	Andréanne Demers	372	1.07	–
Option nationale	Étienne Boily	192	0.55	-1.44
Independent	Jean-Marc Boyer	117	0.34	-0.39
Équipe Autonomiste	Alain Robert	104	0.30	-0.33
Total valid votes		34,837	98.74	–
Total rejected ballots		445	1.26	–
Turnout		35,282	78.48	–
Electors on the lists		44,955	–	–
Liberal hold		Swing		+13.00

2014 Elections Quebec reference:

2012 Quebec general election
Party	Candidate	Votes	%	±%
Liberal	Jean Rousselle	12,973	37.48	-10.87
Parti Québécois	Linda Tousignant	10,564	30.52	-4.57
Coalition Avenir Québec	Christopher Skeete	8,544	24.68	+13.17
Québec solidaire	David Lanneville	1,373	3.97	+0.17
Option nationale	Catherine Houbart	688	1.99	–
Independent	Jean-Marc Boyer	253	0.73	–
Conservative	Alain Robert	219	0.63	–
Total valid votes		34,614	98.88	–
Total rejected ballots		393	1.12	–
Turnout		35,007	79.34	–
Electors on the lists		44,122	–	–
Liberal hold		Swing		-3.15
