= Louis-Philippe Sauvé =

Canadian politician

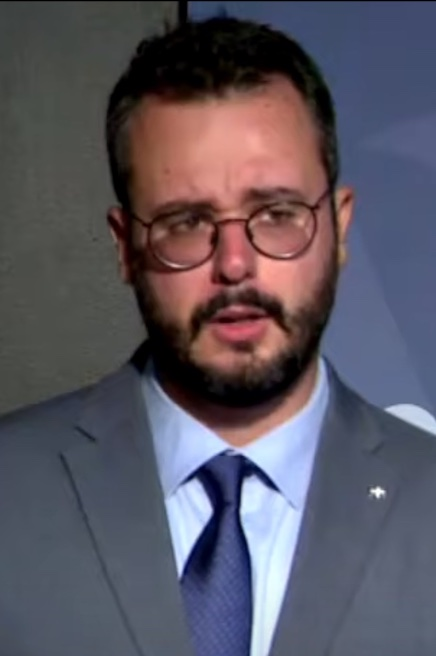
- Sauvé in 2024

Member of Parliament for LaSalle—Émard—Verdun
- In office September 17, 2024 – April 28, 2025
- Preceded by: David Lametti
- Succeeded by: Claude Guay

Personal details
- Party: Bloc Québécois
- Education: Université du Québec à Montréal
- Profession: Administrator, researcher

Louis-Philippe Sauvé is a Canadian politician who served as the Member of Parliament (MP) for LaSalle—Émard—Verdun from 2024 to 2025. He gained the seat for the Bloc Québécois from the Liberals at a by-election on September 16, 2024, with 28% of the vote. Prior to becoming a candidate, Sauvé had been a staff member in the Bloc Québécois' parliamentary branch and research department. He had previously worked as the communications and administration coordinator for the Institute for Research in Contemporary Economics.

Sauvé holds a master's degree in history from the Université du Québec à Montréal and a bachelor's degree in social sciences with a concentration in history from the Université du Québec en Outaouais.

He was unseated in the 2025 Canadian federal election by Liberal candidate Claude Guay.

== Electoral record ==
2025 Canadian federal election: LaSalle—Émard—Verdun
Party	Candidate	Votes	%	±%	Expenditures
Liberal	Claude Guay	27,439	50.86	+7.44	$93,872.19
Bloc Québécois	Louis-Philippe Sauvé	11,467	21.25	−0.58	$40,010.41
Conservative	Zsolt Fischer	7,456	13.82	+6.19	$0.00
New Democratic	Craig Sauvé	5,587	10.36	−8.66	$90,508.24
Green	Bisma Ansari	1,298	2.41	–0.60	$19,799.94
People's	Gregory Yablunovsky	260	0.48	–2.93	$21.11
Rhinoceros	Frédéric Dénommé	169	0.31	N/A	$0.00
Communist	Manuel Johnson	136	0.25	−0.15	$0.00
Marxist–Leninist	Normand Chouinard	81	0.15	N/A	$0.00
Centrist	Fang Hu	60	0.11	N/A	$0.00
Total valid votes/expense limit		53,953	98.79	+0.90	$128,712.71
Total rejected ballots		662	1.21	–0.90	
Turnout		54,615	66.57	+6.29	
Eligible voters		82,042			
Liberal notional hold		Swing		+4.01	
Source: Elections Canada

Canadian federal by-election, September 16, 2024: LaSalle—Émard—Verdun Resignation of David Lametti
Party	Candidate	Votes	%	±%
Bloc Québécois	Louis-Philippe Sauvé	8,925	28.20	+6.11
Liberal	Laura Palestini	8,656	27.35	-15.58
New Democratic	Craig Sauvé	8,272	26.13	+6.77
Conservative	Louis Ialenti	3,641	11.50	+4.05
Green	Jency Mercier	557	1.76	-1.28
Independent	Tina Jiu Ru Zhu	198	0.63	–
People's	Gregory Yablunovsky	159	0.50	-2.88
Canadian Future	Mark Khoury	93	0.29	–
Rhinoceros	Sébastien CoRhino	67	0.21	–
Christian Heritage	Alain Paquette	55	0.17	–
Marijuana	Steve Berthelot	53	0.17	–
Independent	Lanna Palsson	48	0.15	–
Marxist–Leninist	Normand Chouinard	40	0.13	–
No Affiliation	Myriam Beaulieu	40	0.13	–
Independent	Line Bélanger	34	0.11	–
Independent	Marie-Hélène LeBel	30	0.09	–
Independent	Pierre Samson	29	0.09	–
Independent	Julie St-Amand	24	0.08	–
Independent	Laura Vegys	23	0.07	–
No Affiliation	Manon Marie Lili Desbiens	21	0.07	–
Independent	Alain Bourgault	21	0.07	–
Independent	Mark Moutter	20	0.06	–
Independent	Charles Lemieux	19	0.06	–
Independent	Peter Barry Clarke	19	0.06	–
Independent	Guillaume Paradis	19	0.06	–
Independent	Hans Armando Vargas	17	0.05	–
Independent	Felix-Antoine Hamel	17	0.05	–
Independent	Martin Croteau	17	0.05	–
Independent	Daniel Gagnon	17	0.05	–
Independent	Matéo Martin	16	0.05	–
Independent	Daniel St-Pierre	16	0.05	–
Independent	John "The Engineer" Turmel	16	0.05	–
Independent	Alex Banks	16	0.05	–
Independent	Agnieszka Marszalek	15	0.05	–
No Affiliation	Fang Hu	15	0.05	–
Independent	Nassim Barhoumi	15	0.05	–
Independent	Connie Lukawski	14	0.04	–
Independent	Alain Lamontagne	14	0.04	–
Independent	Marie-Eve Vermette	14	0.04	–
Independent	Glen MacDonald	14	0.04	–
Independent	Mylène Bonneau	14	0.04	–
Independent	Martin Acetaria Caesar Jubinville	13	0.04	–
Independent	Réal BatRhino Martel	13	0.04	–
Independent	Andrew Davidson	13	0.04	–
Independent	Ryan Huard	13	0.04	–
Independent	John Dale	12	0.04	–
Independent	John Francis O'Flynn	12	0.04	–
Independent	Jaël Champagne Gareau	12	0.04	–
Independent	Mário Stocco	12	0.04	–
Independent	Jacques-Eric Guy	12	0.04	–
Independent	Yusuf Nasihi	11	0.03	–
Independent	Antony George Ernest Marcil	11	0.03	–
Independent	Samuel Ducharme	11	0.03	–
Independent	Christian Baril	11	0.03	–
Independent	Alexandra Engering	11	0.03	–
Independent	Danny Légaré	10	0.03	–
Independent	Timothy Schoen	10	0.03	–
Independent	Marc Corriveau	10	0.03	–
Independent	Mark Dejewski	9	0.03	–
Independent	Krzysztof Krzywinski	9	0.03	–
Independent	Grayson Pollard	8	0.03	–
Independent	Michael Bednarski	8	0.03	–
Independent	Donovan Eckstrom	7	0.02	–
Independent	Lorant Polya	7	0.02	–
Independent	Judy D. Hill	7	0.02	–
Independent	Adam Smith	6	0.02	–
Independent	Jordan Wong	6	0.02	–
Independent	Jeani Boudreault	6	0.02	–
No Affiliation	Katy Le Rougetel	6	0.02	–
Independent	Elliot Wand	5	0.02	–
Independent	Darcy Justin Vanderwater	5	0.02	–
Independent	Gavin Vanderwater	5	0.02	–
Independent	Lajos Polya	5	0.02	–
Independent	Michael Skirzynski	5	0.02	–
Independent	Gerrit Dogger	4	0.01	–
Independent	Harout Manougian	4	0.01	–
Independent	Roger Sherwood	4	0.01	–
Independent	Spencer Rocchi	4	0.01	–
Independent	Patrick Strzalkowski	4	0.01	–
Independent	Anthony Hamel	3	0.01	–
Independent	Julian Selody	3	0.01	–
Independent	Erle Stanley Bowman	3	0.01	–
Independent	Dji-Pé Frazer	3	0.01	–
Independent	Benjamin Teichman	3	0.01	–
Independent	Winston Neutel	2	0.01	–
Independent	Blake Hamilton	2	0.01	–
Independent	Wallace Richard Rowat	1	0.00	–
Independent	Pascal St-Amand	1	0.00	–
Independent	David Erland	1	0.00	–
Independent	Daniel Stuckless	0	0.00	–
Independent	Ysack Dupont	0	0.00	–
Total valid votes		31,653	97.77	
Total rejected ballots		723	2.23	+0.09
Turnout		32,376	40.84	-19.75
Eligible voters		79,268		
Bloc Québécois gain from Liberal		Swing		+10.81
Source: Elections Canada
