= LaSalle—Émard—Verdun =

Federal electoral district in Quebec, Canada

Quebec electoral district
- Interactive map of riding boundaries from the 2025 federal election

Federal electoral district
- Legislature: House of Commons
MP
Claude Guay
Liberal
- District created: 2013
- First contested: 2015
- Last contested: 2025
- District webpage: profile, map

Demographics
- Population (2021): 107,564
- Electors (2019): 82,321
- Area (km²): 19
- Pop. density (per km²): 5,661.3
- Census division: Montreal
- Census subdivision: Montreal (part)

LaSalle—Émard—Verdun is a federal electoral district in Montreal, Quebec. It was created by the 2012 federal electoral boundaries redistribution and was legally defined in the 2013 representation order. It came into effect upon the call of the 2015 Canadian federal election, held on 19 October 2015.

== History ==
The riding was created out of parts of Jeanne-Le Ber (51%) and LaSalle—Émard (49%) plus a small section of territory between the Lachine Canal and the Le Sud-Ouest borough boundary taken from Westmount—Ville-Marie and an adjacent uninhabited section from Notre-Dame-de-Grâce—Lachine. The riding was originally intended to be named LaSalle—Verdun.

The former member of Parliament for the LaSalle—Émard riding, Hélène Leblanc, sought reelection in the new riding for the NDP, while the incumbent in Jeanne-Le Ber, Tyrone Benskin lost the party's nomination in the neighbouring riding of Ville-Marie—Le Sud-Ouest—Île-des-Sœurs.

David Lametti of the Liberal Party defeated Leblanc in the riding's first election in 2015. He held the seat until resigning in 2024.

Following the 2022 Canadian federal electoral redistribution, the riding gained the area east of 90th Avenue and south of Airlie Street from Dorval—Lachine—LaSalle. This took effect at the 2025 Canadian federal election.

== Geography ==
The riding includes the borough of Verdun (excluding Nuns' Island), most of the Sault-Saint-Louis area of the borough of LaSalle, along with the neighbourhoods of Angrignon, Ville-Émard and Côte-Saint-Paul in the Le Sud-Ouest borough.

In the 2019 and 2021 elections, the Liberals won throughout the riding, but were the strongest in LaSalle, the only part of the district where they won a majority of the vote in both elections. The Bloc vote is concentrated more in the central part of the riding, while the NDP is particularly strong in the Wellington-de-l'Église neighbourhood of Verdun.

== Demographics ==
According to the 2021 Canadian census, 2023 representation order

Racial groups: 72.7% White, 7.5% Black, 4.3% Chinese, 4.0% Latin American, 3.2% South Asian, 2.7% Arab, 1.6% Indigenous, 1.1% Southeast Asian
Languages: 57.3% French, 23.5% English, 4.0% Spanish, 2.6% Mandarin, 2.3% Italian, 1.8% Arabic, 1.3% Russian
Religions: 52.6% Christian (39.9% Catholic, 2.2% Christian Orthodox, 1.1% Anglican, 9.4% Other), 5.8% Muslim, 1.1% Hindu, 37.4% None
Median income: $38,800 (2020)
Average income: $47,440 (2020)

== Members of Parliament ==
This riding has elected the following members of Parliament:

Parliament	Years	Member	Party
LaSalle—Émard—Verdun; Riding created from Jeanne-Le Ber, LaSalle—Émard, Notre-Dame-de-Grâce—Lachine and Westmount—Ville-Marie
42nd	2015–2019	David Lametti	Liberal
43rd	2019–2021	David Lametti	Liberal
44th	2021–2024	David Lametti	Liberal
44th	2024–2025	Louis-Philippe Sauvé	Bloc Québécois
45th	2025–present	Claude Guay	Liberal

== Election results ==
2025 Canadian federal election
Party	Candidate	Votes	%	±%
Liberal	Claude Guay	27,439	50.86	+7.44
Bloc Québécois	Louis-Philippe Sauvé	11,467	21.25	−0.58
Conservative	Zsolt Fischer	7,456	13.82	+6.19
New Democratic	Craig Sauvé	5,587	10.36	−8.66
Green	Bisma Ansari	1,298	2.41	−0.60
People's	Gregory Yablunovsky	260	0.48	−2.93
Rhinoceros	Frédéric Dénommé	169	0.31	N/A
Communist	Manuel Johnson	136	0.25	−0.15
Marxist–Leninist	Normand Chouinard	81	0.15	N/A
Centrist	Fang Hu	60	0.11	N/A
Total valid votes/expense limit		53,953	98.79	
Total rejected ballots		662	1.21	-0.90
Turnout		54,615	66.57	+6.29
Eligible voters		82,042		
Liberal notional hold		Swing		+4.01
Source: Elections Canada

Canadian federal by-election, September 16, 2024 Resignation of David Lametti
Party	Candidate	Votes	%	±%
Bloc Québécois	Louis-Philippe Sauvé	8,925	28.20	+6.11
Liberal	Laura Palestini	8,656	27.35	-15.58
New Democratic	Craig Sauvé	8,272	26.13	+6.77
Conservative	Louis Ialenti	3,641	11.50	+4.05
Green	Jency Mercier	557	1.76	-1.28
Independent	Tina Jiu Ru Zhu	198	0.63	–
People's	Gregory Yablunovsky	159	0.50	-2.88
Canadian Future	Mark Khoury	93	0.29	–
Rhinoceros	Sébastien CoRhino	67	0.21	–
Christian Heritage	Alain Paquette	55	0.17	–
Marijuana	Steve Berthelot	53	0.17	–
Independent	Lanna Palsson	48	0.15	–
Marxist–Leninist	Normand Chouinard	40	0.13	–
No Affiliation	Myriam Beaulieu	40	0.13	–
Independent	Line Bélanger	34	0.11	–
Independent	Marie-Hélène LeBel	30	0.09	–
Independent	Pierre Samson	29	0.09	–
Independent	Julie St-Amand	24	0.08	–
Independent	Laura Vegys	23	0.07	–
No Affiliation	Manon Marie Lili Desbiens	21	0.07	–
Independent	Alain Bourgault	21	0.07	–
Independent	Mark Moutter	20	0.06	–
Independent	Charles Lemieux	19	0.06	–
Independent	Peter Barry Clarke	19	0.06	–
Independent	Guillaume Paradis	19	0.06	–
Independent	Hans Armando Vargas	17	0.05	–
Independent	Felix-Antoine Hamel	17	0.05	–
Independent	Martin Croteau	17	0.05	–
Independent	Daniel Gagnon	17	0.05	–
Independent	Matéo Martin	16	0.05	–
Independent	Daniel St-Pierre	16	0.05	–
Independent	John "The Engineer" Turmel	16	0.05	–
Independent	Alex Banks	16	0.05	–
Independent	Agnieszka Marszalek	15	0.05	–
No Affiliation	Fang Hu	15	0.05	–
Independent	Nassim Barhoumi	15	0.05	–
Independent	Connie Lukawski	14	0.04	–
Independent	Alain Lamontagne	14	0.04	–
Independent	Marie-Eve Vermette	14	0.04	–
Independent	Glen MacDonald	14	0.04	–
Independent	Mylène Bonneau	14	0.04	–
Independent	Martin Acetaria Caesar Jubinville	13	0.04	–
Independent	Réal BatRhino Martel	13	0.04	–
Independent	Andrew Davidson	13	0.04	–
Independent	Ryan Huard	13	0.04	–
Independent	John Dale	12	0.04	–
Independent	John Francis O'Flynn	12	0.04	–
Independent	Jaël Champagne Gareau	12	0.04	–
Independent	Mário Stocco	12	0.04	–
Independent	Jacques-Eric Guy	12	0.04	–
Independent	Yusuf Nasihi	11	0.03	–
Independent	Antony George Ernest Marcil	11	0.03	–
Independent	Samuel Ducharme	11	0.03	–
Independent	Christian Baril	11	0.03	–
Independent	Alexandra Engering	11	0.03	–
Independent	Danny Légaré	10	0.03	–
Independent	Timothy Schoen	10	0.03	–
Independent	Marc Corriveau	10	0.03	–
Independent	Mark Dejewski	9	0.03	–
Independent	Krzysztof Krzywinski	9	0.03	–
Independent	Grayson Pollard	8	0.03	–
Independent	Michael Bednarski	8	0.03	–
Independent	Donovan Eckstrom	7	0.02	–
Independent	Lorant Polya	7	0.02	–
Independent	Judy D. Hill	7	0.02	–
Independent	Adam Smith	6	0.02	–
Independent	Jordan Wong	6	0.02	–
Independent	Jeani Boudreault	6	0.02	–
No Affiliation	Katy Le Rougetel	6	0.02	–
Independent	Elliot Wand	5	0.02	–
Independent	Darcy Justin Vanderwater	5	0.02	–
Independent	Gavin Vanderwater	5	0.02	–
Independent	Lajos Polya	5	0.02	–
Independent	Michael Skirzynski	5	0.02	–
Independent	Gerrit Dogger	4	0.01	–
Independent	Harout Manougian	4	0.01	–
Independent	Roger Sherwood	4	0.01	–
Independent	Spencer Rocchi	4	0.01	–
Independent	Patrick Strzalkowski	4	0.01	–
Independent	Anthony Hamel	3	0.01	–
Independent	Julian Selody	3	0.01	–
Independent	Erle Stanley Bowman	3	0.01	–
Independent	Dji-Pé Frazer	3	0.01	–
Independent	Benjamin Teichman	3	0.01	–
Independent	Winston Neutel	2	0.01	–
Independent	Blake Hamilton	2	0.01	–
Independent	Wallace Richard Rowat	1	0.00	–
Independent	Pascal St-Amand	1	0.00	–
Independent	David Erland	1	0.00	–
Independent	Daniel Stuckless	0	0.00	–
Independent	Ysack Dupont	0	0.00	–
Total valid votes		31,653	97.77	
Total rejected ballots		723	2.23	+0.09
Turnout		32,376	40.84	-19.75
Eligible voters		79,268		
Bloc Québécois gain from Liberal		Swing		+10.81
Source: Elections Canada

2021 federal election redistributed results
Party	Vote	%
Liberal	21,271	43.42
Bloc Québécois	10,693	21.83
New Democratic	9,314	19.01
Conservative	3,738	7.63
People's	1,671	3.41
Green	1,475	3.01
Free	636	1.30
Communist	196	0.40
Total valid votes	48,994	97.88
Rejected ballots	1,059	2.12
Registered voters/ estimated turnout	83,028	60.28

2021 Canadian federal election
Party	Candidate	Votes	%	±%	Expenditures
Liberal	David Lametti	20,330	42.93	-0.60	$55,842.59
Bloc Québécois	Raphaël Guérard	10,461	22.09	-2.00	$9,992.28
New Democratic	Jason De Lierre	9,168	19.36	+2.89	$2,674.57
Conservative	Janina Moran	3,530	7.45	+0.41	$714.88
People's	Michel Walsh	1,600	3.38	+2.44	$2,295.27
Green	Sarah Carter	1,439	3.04	-3.80	$0.00
Free	Pascal Antonin	636	1.34	N/A	$2.73
Communist	J.P. Fortin	196	0.41	N/A	$0.00
Total valid votes/expense limit		47,360	97.86	–	$110,554.58
Total rejected ballots		1,036	2.14	+0.52	
Turnout		48,396	60.59	-3.78	
Registered voters		79,869			
Liberal hold		Swing		+0.70	
Source: Elections Canada

2019 Canadian federal election
Party	Candidate	Votes	%	±%	Expenditures
Liberal	David Lametti	22,803	43.52	-0.38	$80,672.35
Bloc Québécois	Isabel Dion	12,619	24.09	+7.04	none listed
New Democratic	Steven Scott	8,628	16.47	-12.48	$15,273.80
Conservative	Claudio Rocchi	3,690	7.04	+0.14	none listed
Green	Jency Mercier	3,583	6.84	+3.65	none listed
People's	Daniel Turgeon	490	0.94	–	none listed
No affiliation	Julien Côté	274	0.52	–	$3,639.71
Rhinoceros	Rhino Jacques Bélanger	265	0.51	–	$0.00
Marxist–Leninist	Eileen Studd	39	0.07	–	$0.00
Total valid votes/expense limit		52,391	98.38		
Total rejected ballots		864	1.62	+0.11	
Turnout		53,255	64.37	-0.47	
Eligible voters		82,733			
Liberal hold		Swing		-3.71	
Source: Elections Canada

2015 Canadian federal election
Party	Candidate	Votes	%	±%	Expenditures
Liberal	David Lametti	23,603	43.90	+25.61	$93,016.24
New Democratic	Hélène LeBlanc	15,566	28.95	-16.22	$46,314.39
Bloc Québécois	Gilbert Paquette	9,164	17.05	-6.39	$43,806.34
Conservative	Mohammad Zamir	3,713	6.91	-2.83	–
Green	Lorraine Banville	1,717	3.19	+0.64	–
Total valid votes/expense limit		53,763	98.49		$221,667.78
Total rejected ballots		823	1.51	–	
Turnout		54,586	64.84	–	
Eligible voters		84,192			
Liberal notional gain from New Democratic		Swing		+20.91	
Source: Elections Canada

2011 federal election redistributed results
Party	Vote	%
New Democratic	22,071	45.17
Bloc Québécois	11,453	23.44
Liberal	8,939	18.29
Conservative	4,759	9.74
Green	1,248	2.55
Others	392	0.80

== See also ==
- List of Canadian electoral districts
- Historical federal electoral districts of Canada
