= David Lametti =

Canadian politician (born 1962)

His Excellency the Honourable David Lametti PC KC
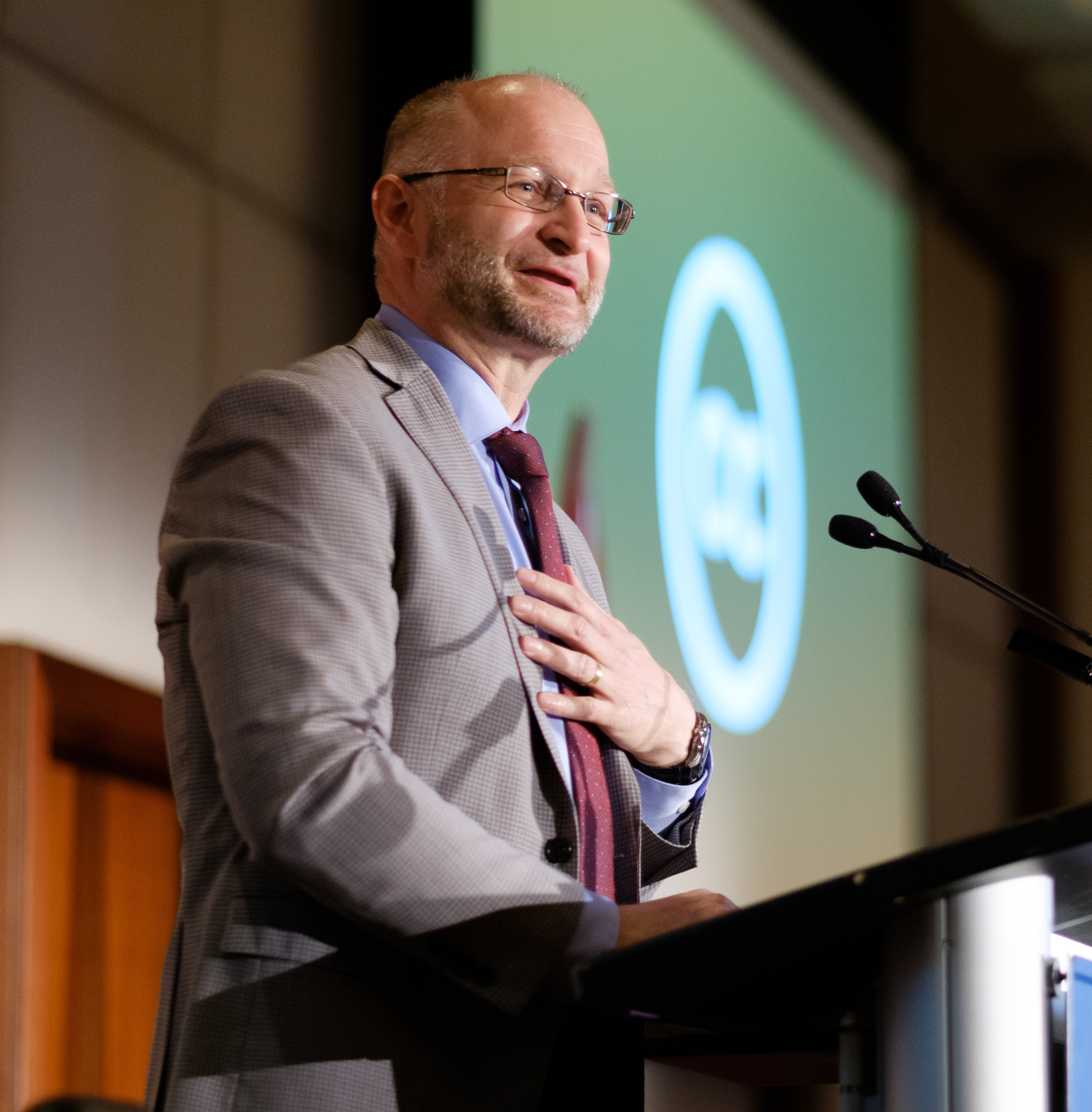
- Lametti in 2017

26th Canadian Ambassador to the United Nations
- Incumbent
- Assumed office November 17, 2025
- Prime Minister: Mark Carney
- Preceded by: Bob Rae

39th Principal Secretary to the Prime Minister of Canada
- In office July 14, 2025 – September 17, 2025 Serving with Tom Pitfield
- Prime Minister: Mark Carney
- Preceded by: Tom Pitfield (interim)
- Succeeded by: Tom Pitfield

Minister of Justice Attorney General of Canada
- In office January 14, 2019 – July 26, 2023
- Prime Minister: Justin Trudeau
- Preceded by: Jody Wilson-Raybould
- Succeeded by: Arif Virani

Parliamentary Secretary to the Minister of Innovation, Science and Economic Development
- In office January 30, 2017 – January 14, 2019
- Minister: Navdeep Bains
- Preceded by: Greg Fergus
- Succeeded by: Position abolished

Parliamentary Secretary to the Minister of International Trade
- In office December 2, 2015 – January 27, 2017
- Minister: Chrystia Freeland; François-Philippe Champagne
- Preceded by: Parm Gill
- Succeeded by: Pamela Goldsmith-Jones

Member of Parliament for LaSalle—Émard—Verdun
- In office October 19, 2015 – February 1, 2024
- Preceded by: Hélène LeBlanc
- Succeeded by: Louis-Philippe Sauvé

Personal details
- Born: David T. Lametti; August 10, 1962 (age 64) Port Colborne, Ontario, Canada
- Party: Liberal
- Education: University of Toronto (BA); McGill University (LLB, BCL); Yale University (LLM); Exeter College, Oxford (DPhil)

David T. Lametti (born August 10, 1962) is a Canadian diplomat, lawyer, and former politician who has served as the Canadian ambassador to the United Nations since November 17, 2025. Lametti was previously Minister of Justice and Attorney General of Canada from 2019 to 2023. A member of the Liberal Party, he was the member of Parliament (MP) for LaSalle—Émard—Verdun from 2015 to 2024. After leaving electoral politics, he was Principal Secretary to Prime Minister Mark Carney from July to September 2025.

Born in Port Colborne, Ontario, Lametti graduated from University of Toronto and studied law at McGill University, Yale University, and Exeter College, Oxford. Prior to entering politics, he was a professor of law at McGill University, a member of the Institute of Comparative Law, and a founding member of the Centre for Intellectual Property Policy.

== Early life and legal career ==
Lametti was born on August 10, 1962, in Port Colborne, Ontario, Canada, to Italian immigrants. Lametti earned his Bachelor of Arts degree in economics and political science from the University of Toronto in 1985, and his Bachelor of Laws and Bachelor of Civil Law degrees at McGill University in 1989. He then served as a clerk to Justice Peter Cory of the Supreme Court of Canada in 1989–90. In 1991, Lametti completed a Master of Laws degree from Yale Law School and in 1999, he completed a Doctor of Philosophy degree in law at Exeter College, Oxford, with a thesis, The Deon-Telos of Private Property: Ethical Aspects of the Theory and Practice of Private Property. At Oxford, Lametti served as co-captain of the Oxford University Ice Hockey Club alongside Mark Carney.

In 1995, after having been a visiting lecturer at the Faculty of Law, University of New Brunswick, Lametti accepted a lecturing position at the Faculty of Law, McGill University, where he taught and conducted research. He became an assistant professor in 1998, an associate professor in 2003, and was promoted to full professor with tenure in 2015. He lectured and wrote on subjects related to civil and common law property, intellectual property, property theory and ethics. His work led to the creation of the Centre for Intellectual Property Policy, which he co-founded in 2003 and for which he served as director from 2009 to 2011. He was Associate Dean (Academic) of the McGill Faculty of Law between 2008 and 2011, was a member of McGill University's Senate from 2012 to 2015, and was formerly a Governor of the Fondation du Barreau du Québec. During his parliamentary and ministerial service, he was on leave from McGill.

Lametti is the author of academic publications on the subjects of property, intellectual property, and social norms.

== Political and diplomatic career ==
Lametti became interested in politics as a teenager, when he worked as a volunteer for the Liberal Party in the 1979 Canadian federal election, and then subsequent provincial and federal elections for Liberal candidates, including former MP and speaker, Gilbert Parent. Lametti co-founded the Erie Riding New Liberals, the youth wing of the Liberal Party of Canada in southern Niagara.

On June 16, 2014, Lametti launched his bid to become the Liberal Party candidate in the new riding of LaSalle—Émard—Verdun. Lametti won the contested nomination race on February 8, 2015, and won the riding's seat in Parliament in the 2015 Canadian federal election. On December 2, 2015, Lametti was named parliamentary secretary to Minister of International Trade Chrystia Freeland. On January 26, 2017, Lametti was shuffled to become parliamentary secretary to Minister of Innovation, Science and Economic Development Navdeep Bains.

On January 14, 2019, Lametti was appointed Minister of Justice and Attorney General of Canada by Prime Minister Justin Trudeau, and on April 15 of that year, he was appointed a Queen's Counsel. Lametti was dropped from cabinet in July 2023 as the result of a cabinet shuffle. On January 25, 2024, he announced his resignation from parliament effective February 1, 2024, in order to join law firm Fasken Martineau DuMoulin where he will specialize in Indigenous law.

In June 2025, Lametti was reportedly chosen by Prime Minister Carney as his Principal Secretary. Prior to the appointment, he had helped with Carney's transition into office and as an informal advisor. In September 2025, it was reported that Lametti was leaving the Prime Minister's Office for a diplomatic posting. On September 18, he was named Permanent Representative of Canada to the United Nations, taking over from Bob Rae on November 17. In 2026, Carney also named Lametti as Canada's representative to the Ismaili Imamat.

== Electoral record ==
2021 Canadian federal election: LaSalle—Émard—Verdun
Party	Candidate	Votes	%	±%	Expenditures
Liberal	David Lametti	20,330	42.93	-0.60	$55,842.59
Bloc Québécois	Raphaël Guérard	10,461	22.09	-2.00	$9,992.28
New Democratic	Jason De Lierre	9,168	19.36	+2.89	$2,674.57
Conservative	Janina Moran	3,530	7.45	+0.41	$714.88
People's	Michel Walsh	1,600	3.38	+2.44	$2,295.27
Green	Sarah Carter	1,439	3.04	-3.80	$0.00
Free	Pascal Antonin	636	1.34	N/A	$2.73
Communist	J.P. Fortin	196	0.41	N/A	$0.00
Total valid votes/expense limit		47,360	97.86	–	$110,554.58
Total rejected ballots		1,036	2.14	+0.52	
Turnout		48,396	60.59	-3.78	
Registered voters		79,869			
Liberal hold		Swing		+0.70	
Source: Elections Canada

2019 Canadian federal election: LaSalle—Émard—Verdun
Party	Candidate	Votes	%	±%	Expenditures
Liberal	David Lametti	22,803	43.52	-0.38	$80,672.35
Bloc Québécois	Isabel Dion	12,619	24.09	+7.04	none listed
New Democratic	Steven Scott	8,628	16.47	-12.48	$15,273.80
Conservative	Claudio Rocchi	3,690	7.04	+0.14	none listed
Green	Jency Mercier	3,583	6.84	+3.65	none listed
People's	Daniel Turgeon	490	0.94	–	none listed
No affiliation	Julien Côté	274	0.52	–	$3,639.71
Rhinoceros	Rhino Jacques Bélanger	265	0.51	–	$0.00
Marxist–Leninist	Eileen Studd	39	0.07	–	$0.00
Total valid votes/expense limit		52,391	98.38		
Total rejected ballots		864	1.62	+0.11	
Turnout		53,255	64.37	-0.47	
Eligible voters		82,733			
Liberal hold		Swing		-3.71	
Source: Elections Canada

2015 Canadian federal election: LaSalle—Émard—Verdun
Party	Candidate	Votes	%	±%	Expenditures
Liberal	David Lametti	23,603	43.90	+25.61	$93,016.24
New Democratic	Hélène LeBlanc	15,566	28.95	-16.22	$46,314.39
Bloc Québécois	Gilbert Paquette	9,164	17.05	-6.39	$43,806.34
Conservative	Mohammad Zamir	3,713	6.91	-2.83	–
Green	Lorraine Banville	1,717	3.19	+0.64	–
Total valid votes/expense limit		53,763	98.49		$221,667.78
Total rejected ballots		823	1.51	–	
Turnout		54,586	64.84	–	
Eligible voters		84,192			
Liberal notional gain from New Democratic		Swing		+20.91	
Source: Elections Canada

29th Canadian Ministry (2015–2025) – Cabinet of Justin Trudeau
Cabinet post (1)
Predecessor	Office	Successor
Jody Wilson-Raybould	Minister of Justice; 2019–2023	Arif Virani
