= L'Île-de-la-Visitation Nature Park =

Large nature park in Montreal, Canada

- Parc-nature de l'Île-de-la-Visitation
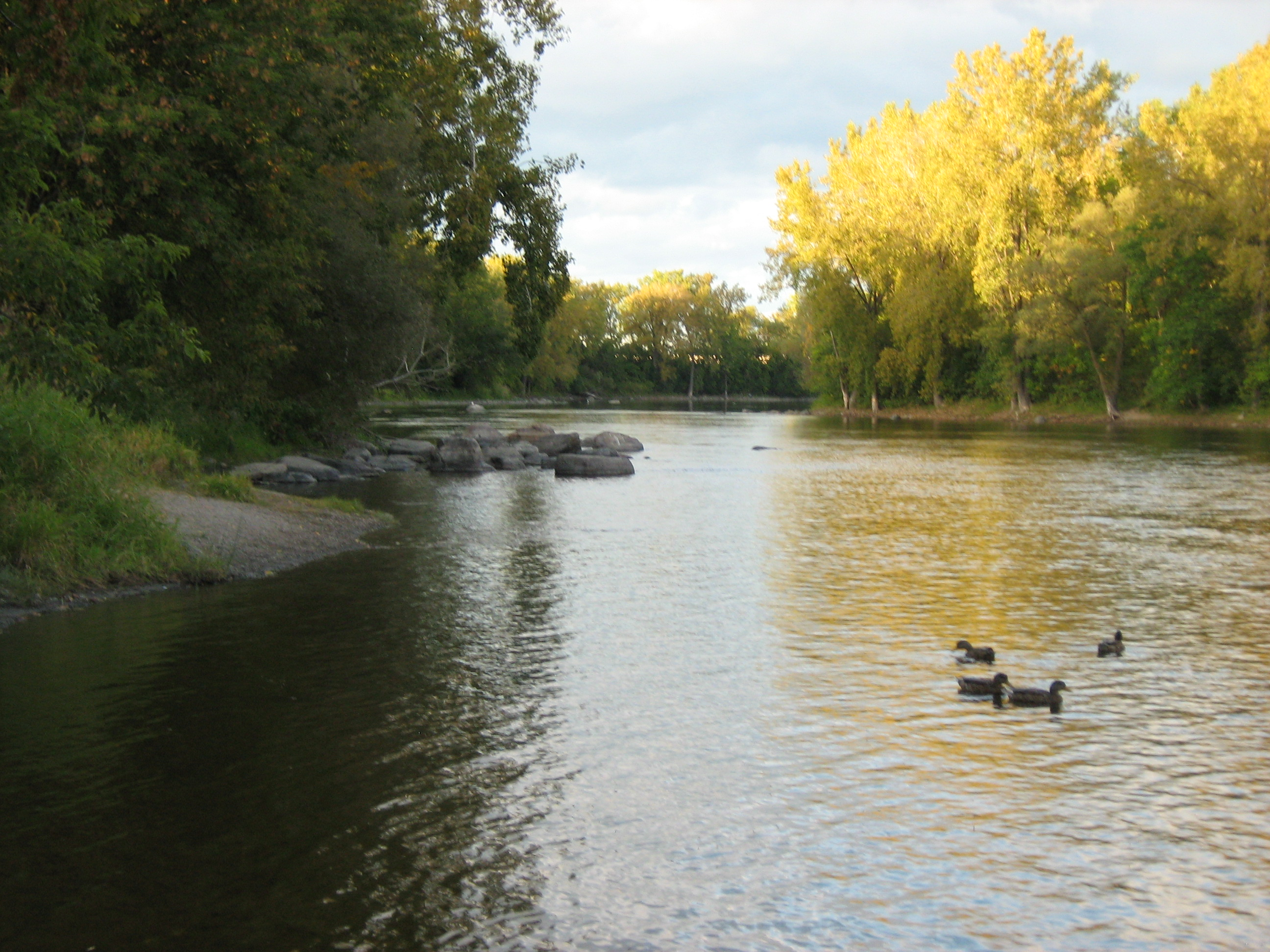
- Ducks at sunset in the park

- Location within Montreal
- Type: Nature park
- Location: Ahuntsic-Cartierville/Montréal-Nord, Montreal, Quebec, Canada
- Coordinates: 45°34′41″N 73°39′42″W
- Area: 34 hectares (84 acres)
- Created: 1984
- Operator: City of Montreal
- Open: 7:00 a.m. to sunset
- Status: Open all year
- Public transit: STM Bus: 45
- Website: Official website

L'Île-de-la-Visitation Nature Park (French: Parc-nature de l'Île-de-la-Visitation) is a large nature park in the Ahuntsic-Cartierville and Montréal-Nord boroughs of Montreal, Quebec, Canada.

Much of the park is on Île de la Visitation, with the rest being opposite the island on the shore of the Island of Montreal. Bridges connect the two sections. The park was established in 1984 during the renovation of the Rivière des Prairies generating station. It has an area of 34 hectares.

The footpaths along the shore allow for walking and offer views of the Rivière des Prairies. The park has 8.8 kilometres (5.5 mi) of hiking trails and 3.6 kilometres (2.2 mi) of bike paths. Fishing is allowed in designated areas.

Various historical monuments (Milling site, Maison du Pressoir, Maison du Meunier) and picnic tables are located along the trail.

In winter, cross-country skiing trails are offered. There is also a small hill that is used for tobogganing by children.

The current of the Rivière des Prairies is calm around the island.
