= Luis Miranda (Canadian politician) =

Canadian politician

Borough mayor for Anjou and Montreal City Councillor
- Incumbent
- Assumed office January 1, 2002
- Preceded by: Position created

Mayor of Anjou
- In office 1997–2001
- Succeeded by: Position abolished

Personal details
- Party: Union Montréal (2001-2005); Équipe Anjou (2005-2008); Union Montréal (2008-2013); Équipe Anjou (2013-)

Luis Miranda is a city councillor from Montreal, Quebec, Canada. He is the mayor of the Anjou borough. He was a member of the Union Montreal municipal political party, but is now a member of Equipe Anjou.

== Biography ==
Miranda was born on São Miguel Island, Azores in Portugal.

Since January 2009, he has been on the city's executive committee, responsible for city services, the city's 3-1-1 telephone service, economic development, the committee for east end city councillors, and as the city's representative in the non-profit Montreal International organization.

Miranda has served as a city councillor in Anjou since 1989. In 1997, he was elected as mayor of the city of Anjou, and following its merger with Montreal in 2001, was elected as the borough mayor of Anjou. He was re-elected borough mayor in 2005, 2009, 2013, 2017 and 2021.

== Municipal electoral record ==
2025 Montreal municipal election: Borough Mayor- Anjou
Party	Candidate	Votes	%	±%
Équipe Anjou	Luis Miranda	7,485	70.01	-0.41
Projet Montréal	Alex Megelas	1,820	17.02	-7.47
Action Montréal	Ernesto Almeida Acuna	891	8.33	new
Transition Montréal	David de Laurière	495	4.63	new
Total valid votes/expense limit		10,691	96.46	
Total rejected ballots		392	3.54	-0.13
Turnout		11,083	39.18	
Eligible voters		28,288	–	–

2021 Montreal municipal election: Borough Mayor- Anjou
Party	Candidate	Votes	%	±%
Équipe Anjou	Luis Miranda	7,857	70.42	+16.15
Projet Montréal	Kettly Beauregard	2,732	24.49	-0.86
Mouvement Montréal	Wassim Meradi	568	5.09	new
Total valid votes/expense limit		11,157	96.59	
Total rejected ballots		349	3.41	-0.36
Turnout		11,551	40.29	
Eligible voters		28,673	–	–

2017 Montreal municipal election: Borough Mayor- Anjou
Party	Candidate	Votes	%	±%
Équipe Anjou	Luis Miranda	7,518	54.27	-2.19
Équipe Denis Coderre	Angela Mancini	3,511	25.35	+0.86
Projet Montréal	Rémy Tondreau	2,823	20.38	
Total valid votes/expense limit		13,852	96.23	
Total rejected ballots		542	3.77	+0.37
Turnout		14,394	48.67	
Eligible voters		29,577	–	–

2013 Montreal municipal election: Borough Mayor- Anjou
Party	Candidate	Votes	%	±%
Équipe Anjou	Luis Miranda	7,868	56.46	+56.46
Équipe Denis Coderre	Rémi Tondreau	3,412	24.49	new
Projet Montréal	René Obregon	1,752	12.57	-2.53
Coalition Montréal	Nyrlande Marcellus	903	6.48	new
Total valid votes/expense limit		13,935	96.60	
Total rejected ballots		490	3.40	-0.10
Turnout		14,425	49.45	
Eligible voters		29,172	–	–

2009 Montreal municipal election: Borough Mayor- Anjou
Party	Candidate	Votes	%	±%
Union Montreal	Luis Miranda	7,403	55.32	+26.88
Vision Montreal	Lynda Côté	3,958	29.58	+18.02
Projet Montréal	Philippe Duval	2,020	15.10	+12.74
Total valid votes/expense limit		13,381	96.50	
Total rejected ballots		486	3.50	N/A
Turnout		13,867	46.61	
Eligible voters		29,753	–	–

2005 Montreal municipal election: Borough Mayor- Anjou
Party	Candidate	Votes	%	±%
Équipe Anjou	Luis Miranda	7,734	57.36	
Citizens Union	Carol Beaupré	3,817	28.44	
Vision Montreal	Rémi Arsenault	1,552	11.56	
Projet Montréal	Gilles Rhéaume	317	2.36	new
Total valid votes/expense limit		13,420	N/A	
Total rejected ballots		N/A	N/A	N/A
Turnout		N/A	N/A	
Eligible voters		N/A	–	–
