= 2025 Montreal municipal election =

Election in Quebec, Canada

- November 2 2025
- Mayoral election
- November 2, 2025
- Registered: 1,135,883
- Turnout: 37.07% (▼1.25 pp)
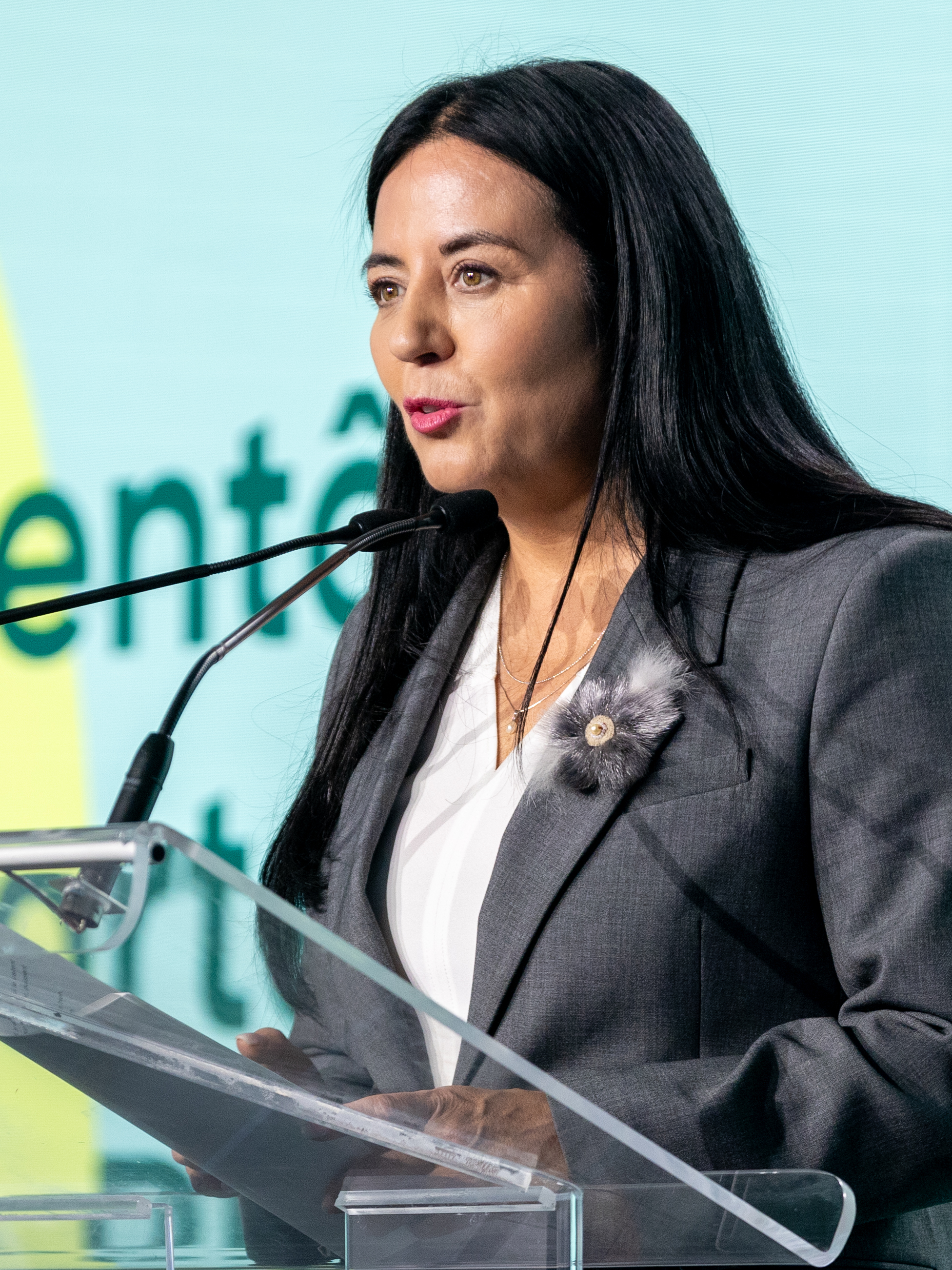

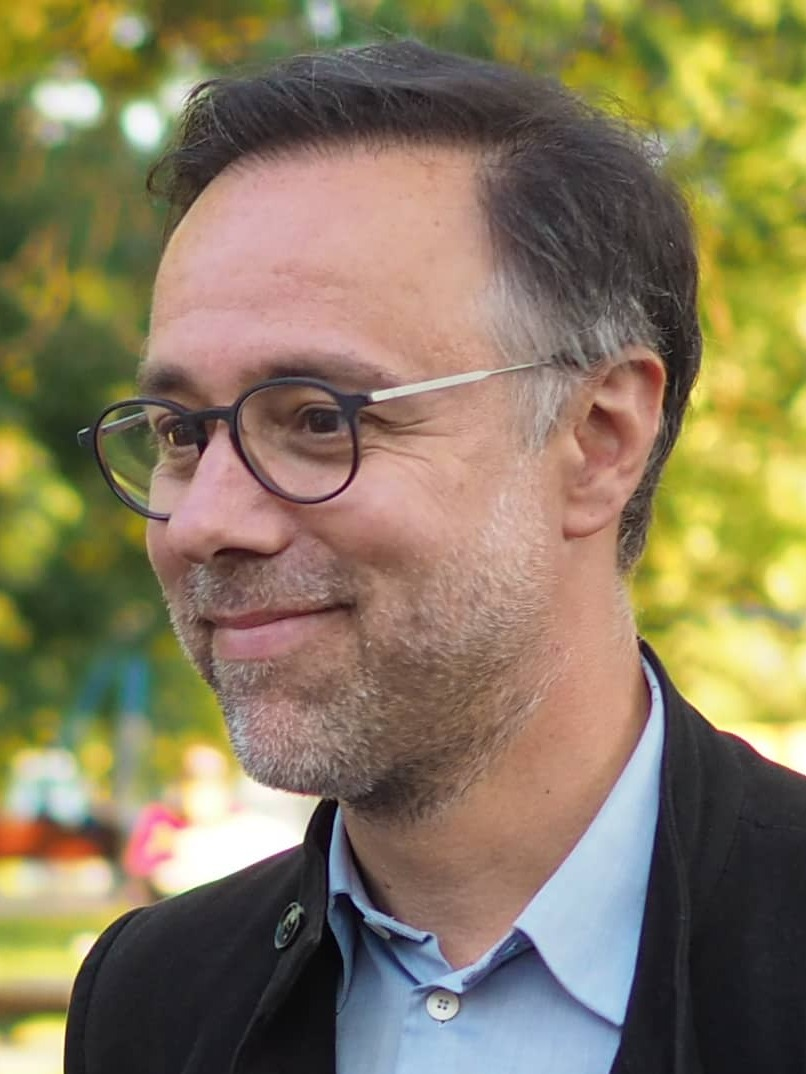
Nominee	Soraya Martinez Ferrada	Luc Rabouin
Party	Ensemble Montréal	Projet Montréal
Popular vote	178,618	144,235
Percentage	43.40%	35.05%
	AM	TM
Nominee	Gilbert Thibodeau	Craig Sauvé
Party	Action Montréal	Transition Montréal
Popular vote	41,818	34,787
Percentage	10.16%	8.45%
Mayor before election
Valérie Plante
Projet Montréal
Elected mayor
Soraya Martinez Ferrada
Ensemble Montréal
- City Council election
- November 2, 2025
- 65 seats on Montreal City Council (Note: The mayor is a member of City Council, but for the purposes of documentation is treated as their own individual.); 33 seats needed for a majority
Party	Leader	Seats	+/–
Ensemble Montréal	Soraya Martinez Ferrada	34	+11
Projet Montréal	Luc Rabouin	25	−12
Équipe LaSalle Team	Nancy Blanchet	3	0
Équipe Anjou	Luis Miranda	2	0
Équipe St-Léonard	Suzanne De Larochellière	1	+1
This lists parties that won seats. See the complete results below.

Municipal elections were held in the city of Montreal, Quebec, Canada, on November 2, 2025, as part of the 2025 Quebec municipal elections.

The incumbent Projet Montréal–led council sought re-election to a third consecutive term under new leader Luc Rabouin; the party was defeated by Ensemble Montréal, led by former federal Liberal MP Soraya Martinez Ferrada. They won a majority on city council, and Martinez Ferrada defeated Luc Rabouin in the mayoral election.

== Background ==
Voters elect 103 representatives in a first-past-the-post electoral system. The general election decides the composition of the city council and each of the 19 borough councils. The newly elected mayor appoints 2 city councillors for the Ville-Marie borough. In total, 18 borough mayors, 46 city councillors and 38 borough councillors are elected.

Incumbent mayor Valérie Plante decided not to run for reelection to a third term.

=== Political parties ===
Registered political parties of Montreal
Party	Leader
Action Montréal - Équipe Gilbert Thibodeau	Gilbert Thibodeau
Citoyen.ne.s Outremont	Marc Poulin
Ensemble Montréal - Équipe Soraya	Soraya Martinez Ferrada
Équipe Anjou	Luis Miranda
Équipe LaSalle Team	Nancy Blanchet
Équipe St-Léonard	Suzanne De Larochellière
Futur Montréal	Jean-François Kacou
Mouvement Montréal	Balarama Holness
Parti Outremont	Céline Forget
Projet Montréal - Équipe Luc Rabouin	Luc Rabouin
Transition Montréal - Équipe Craig Sauvé	Craig Sauvé

== Incumbents not running for re-election ==
Borough	Electoral District	Position	Incumbent	Political Party
—	—	Mayor	Valérie Plante	Projet Montréal
Ahuntsic-Cartierville	Sault-au-Récollet	City councillor	Jérôme Normand	Projet Montréal
Côte-des-Neiges– Notre-Dame-de-Grâce	Côte-des-Neiges	City councillor	Magda Popeanu	Projet Montréal
L'Île-Bizard– Sainte-Geneviève	Sainte-Geneviève	Borough councillor	Suzanne Marceau	Ensemble Montréal
Lachine	—	City councillor	Vicki Grondin	Projet Montréal
Lachine	Du Canal	Borough councillor	Micheline Rouleau	Projet Montréal
Lachine	Fort-Rolland	Borough councillor	Michèle Flannery	Projet Montréal
Lachine	J.-Émery-Provost	Borough councillor	Younes Boukala	Projet Montréal
LaSalle	Cecil-P.-Newman	Borough councillor	Michel Noël	LaSalle Team
Mercier– Hochelaga-Maisonneuve	—	Borough mayor	Pierre Lessard-Blais	Projet Montréal
Mercier– Hochelaga-Maisonneuve	Hochelaga	City councillor	Éric Alan Caldwell	Projet Montréal
Outremont	—	Borough mayor	Laurent Desbois	Ensemble Montréal
Outremont	Claude-Ryan	Borough councillor	Mindy Pollak	Projet Montréal
Outremont	Joseph-Beaubien	Borough councillor	Valérie Patreau	Projet Montréal
Outremont	Robert-Bourassa	Borough councillor	Marie Potvin	Ensemble Montréal
Pierrefonds-Roxboro	Cap-Saint-Jacques	City councillor	Catherine Clément-Talbot	Ensemble Montréal
Le Plateau-Mont-Royal	De Lorimier	City councillor	Marianne Giguère	Projet Montréal
Rosemont–La Petite-Patrie	Vieux-Rosemont	City councillor	Dominique Ollivier	Projet Montréal
Saint-Léonard	—	Borough mayor	Michel Bissonnet	Ensemble Montréal
Saint-Léonard	Saint-Léonard-Est	City councillor	Angela Gentile	Ensemble Montréal
Le Sud-Ouest	—	Borough mayor	Benoit Dorais	Projet Montréal
Le Sud-Ouest	Saint-Henri-Est–Petite-Bourgogne– Pointe-Saint-Charles–Griffintown	Borough councillor	Tan Shan Li	Projet Montréal
Le Sud-Ouest	Saint-Paul–Émard–Saint-Henri-Ouest	City councillor	Alain Vaillancourt	Projet Montréal
Le Sud-Ouest	Saint-Paul–Émard–Saint-Henri-Ouest	Borough councillor	Anne-Marie Sigouin	Projet Montréal
Verdun	—	Borough mayor	Marie-Andrée Mauger	Projet Montréal
Verdun	Champlain–L'Île-des-Sœurs	Borough councillor	Enrique Machado	Independent
Verdun	Desmarchais-Crawford	Borough councillor	Kaïla Amaya Munro	Projet Montréal
Ville-Marie	Peter-McGill	City councillor	Serge Sasseville	Independent
Ville-Marie	Sainte-Marie	City councillor	Sophie Mauzerolle	Projet Montréal
Villeray–Saint-Michel– Parc-Extension	—	Borough mayor	Laurence Lavigne Lalonde	Projet Montréal

== Timeline ==
=== 2022 ===
- February 10 – Serge Sasseville, city councillor for the district of Peter-McGill, leaves Ensemble Montréal and sits as an independent.

=== 2023 ===
- August 24 – Stéphane Côté, borough mayor of L'Île-Bizard–Sainte-Geneviève, resigns.
- November 13 – Dominic Ollivier, city councillor for the district of Vieux-Rosemont, resigns as Executive Committee chair.
- December 17 – Doug Hurley of Ensemble Montréal is elected in a by-election to serve as borough mayor of L'Île-Bizard–Sainte-Geneviève, succeeding Stéphane Côté.

=== 2024 ===
- October 23 – Incumbent Mayor Valérie Plante announces that she will not seek re-election and will retire as leader of Projet Montréal before the 2025 election.

=== 2025 ===
- February 28 – Federal member of parliament Soraya Martinez Ferrada is acclaimed leader of Ensemble Montréal.
- March 15 – Luc Rabouin, borough mayor of Le Plateau-Mont-Royal, is elected leader of Projet Montréal with 59.2% of the vote.
- April 28 – Abdelhaq Sari, city councillor for the district of Marie-Clarac, leaves the city council upon being elected to the House of Commons of Canada.
- July 3 – Danielle Myrand, borough councillor for the district of Pierre-Foretier, leaves Ensemble Montréal to join Projet Montréal.
- July 8 – Enrique Machado, borough councillor for the district of Champlain–L'Île-des-Sœurs, leaves Projet Montréal and sits as an independent.
- July 17 – Craig Sauvé, city councillor for the district of Saint-Henri-Est–Petite-Bourgogne–Pointe-Saint-Charles–Griffintown, sitting as an independent, joins Transition Montréal, and will run for mayor under the party banner.
- August 27 – Alain Wilson, borough councillor for the district of Denis-Benjamin-Viger, leaves Ensemble Montréal to join Projet Montréal.
- August 30 – Suzanne De Larochellière, borough councillor for the district of Saint-Léonard-Ouest, leaves Ensemble Montréal and will run for borough mayor under the new party Équipe St-Léonard.
- August 30 – Soraya Martinez Ferrada announces that Ensemble Montréal would not run candidates in LaSalle.
- September 19 – Official beginning of the electoral campaign.
- September 25 – Équipe Anjou allies with Ensemble Montréal.
- September 26 – Michel Bissonnet, Ensemble Montréal borough mayor of Saint-Léonard, announces his support to the candidates of Équipe St-Léonard.
- October 2 – Jean-François Kacou announces that Futur Montréal is withdrawing their support for Dani Muzungu's candidacy for city councillor in Snowdon under their banner after he has been arrested. He is replaced by Julian D'Alesio, who was candidate for borough councillor in Jacques-Bizard.
- October 3 – Parti Outremont allies with Ensemble Montréal, except in the district of Joseph-Beaubien, where its leader Céline Forget is candidate.
- October 3 – Last day of the nomination period: 424 candidates are confirmed by Élections Montréal.
- October 6 – Soraya Martinez Ferrada announces that Ensemble Montréal is withdrawing their support for Alexandre Giasson's candidacy for city councillor in Hochelaga under their banner and requesting he end his campaign.
- October 14 – Le Plateau-Mont-Royal Action Montréal borough councillor candidate Gabriel Houle withdraws his candidacy.
- October 24 – Micheline Rouleau, Projet Montréal borough councillor for the district of Du Canal, announces her support to the candidates of Ensemble Montréal in Lachine.
- October 26 – Advance voting concludes with a turnout of 9.3% of the registered voters.
- November 1 – Michèle Flannery, Projet Montréal borough councillor for the district of Fort-Rolland, announces her support to Craig Sauvé and Christian Rouleau from Transition Montréal, as well as to the 3 Ensemble Montréal borough councillor candidates in Lachine.

== Mayoral election ==
=== Opinion polling ===
Polling firm	Date	Fang Hu	Jean-François Kacou	Soraya Martinez Ferrada	Luc Rabouin	Craig Sauvé	Gilbert Thibodeau	Undecided	Sample size	MOE	Polling method	Lead
Pallas	October 25, 2025	-	3%	33%	18%	6%	11%	29%	608	±4%	Telephone	15%
Segma	October 3-9, 2025	1%	3%	26%	18%	5%	8%	37%	1,002	±3.1%	Online & Telephone	8%
Léger	September 26-30, 2025	-	2%	21%	12%	8%	7%	42%	500	±4.4%	Online	9%
Léger	September 21-15, 2025	-	2%	20%	11%	6%	5%	48%	500	±4.4%	Online	9%
Léger	August 13-19, 2025	-	-	18%	15%	7%	-	41%	798	±3.1%	Online	3%

=== Results ===
2025 Montreal municipal election: Mayor
Party	Candidate	Votes	%	±%
Ensemble Montréal	Soraya Martinez Ferrada	178,618	43.40	
Projet Montréal	Luc Rabouin	144,235	35.05	
Action Montréal	Gilbert Thibodeau	41,818	10.16	+9.13
Transition Montréal	Craig Sauvé	34,787	8.45	
Futur Montréal	Jean-François Kacou	8,723	2.12	
Independent	Fang Hu	1,202	0.29	+0.04
Independent	Jean Duval	1,187	0.29	+0.02
Independent	Katy Le Rougetel	995	0.24	
Total valid votes		411,565	97.73	
Total rejected ballots		9,550	2.27	
Turnout		421,115	37.07	-1.25
Eligible voters		1,135,883		

== City and borough council elections ==
=== Recounts ===
There were ten requests for judicial recounts.

Borough	Position	Preliminary result	Preliminary margin	Final result	Final margin
Côte-des-Neiges– Notre-Dame-de-Grâce	City councillor Loyola	Émilie Brière (Projet)	6	Émilie Brière (Projet) confirmed	8
L'Île-Bizard– Sainte-Geneviève	Borough councillor Jacques-Bizard	Richard Bélanger (Ensemble)	11	Richard Bélanger (Ensemble) confirmed	8
Lachine	Borough mayor	Julie-Pascale Provost (Ensemble)	26	Julie-Pascale Provost (Ensemble) confirmed	11
Lachine	City councillor	Dominic Roussel (Ensemble)	8	Dominic Roussel (Ensemble) confirmed	32
Saint-Léonard	Borough mayor	Dominic Perri (Ensemble)	518	Dominic Perri (Ensemble) confirmed	534
Saint-Léonard	City councillor Saint-Léonard-Ouest	Mauro Barone (Équipe St-Léonard)	300	Mauro Barone (Équipe St-Léonard) confirmed	308
Saint-Léonard	Borough councillor Saint-Léonard-Ouest	Gemma Marchione (Ensemble)	249	Gemma Marchione (Ensemble) confirmed	264
Verdun	Borough mayor	Céline-Audrey Beauregard (Projet)	45	Céline-Audrey Beauregard (Projet) confirmed	48
Ville-Marie	City councillor Saint-Jacques	Claude Pinard (Ensemble)	13	Claude Pinard (Ensemble) confirmed	23
Villeray–Saint-Michel– Parc-Extension	City councillor Parc-Extension	Elvira Carhuallanqui (Projet)	6	Elvira Carhuallanqui (Projet) confirmed	44

=== Seat totals ===
The parties won the following seats:

Position	Ensemble Montréal	Projet Montréal	Équipe LaSalle Team	Équipe Anjou	Équipe St-Léonard	Independent
Mayor of Montreal	1	0	0	0	0	0
Borough mayor	10	6	1	1	0	0
City councillor	23	19	2	1	1	0
City council total	34	25	3	2	1	0
Borough councillor	20	10	4	3	0	1
Total seats	54	35	7	5	1	1

=== Composition of city and borough councils ===
Depending on their borough, Montrealers voted for:

- Mayor of Montreal
- Borough mayor, who is also a city councillor and borough councillor
  - Ville-Marie: No borough mayor election; the mayor of Montreal is ex officio borough mayor
- One city councillor per district, who is also a borough councillor. Exceptions:
  - Anjou and Lachine: one city councillor for the entire borough
  - Outremont and L'Île-Bizard–Sainte-Geneviève: no city councillors other than the borough mayor
- Zero, one, or two additional borough councillors per district

Borough	District				
Borough	District	City Councillors		Borough Councillor	Borough Councillor
Borough	District	Borough Mayor	City Councillor	Borough Councillor	Borough Councillor
Ahuntsic-Cartierville	Ahuntsic	Maude Théroux-Séguin	Nathalie Goulet		
Ahuntsic-Cartierville	Bordeaux-Cartierville	Maude Théroux-Séguin	Effie Giannou		
Ahuntsic-Cartierville	Saint-Sulpice	Maude Théroux-Séguin	Victor Esposito		
Ahuntsic-Cartierville	Sault-au-Récollet	Maude Théroux-Séguin	Carla Beauvais		
Anjou	Centre	Luis Miranda	Andrée Hénault	Kristine Marsolais	
Anjou	East	Luis Miranda	Andrée Hénault	Richard Leblanc	
Anjou	West	Luis Miranda	Andrée Hénault	Marie-Josée Dubé	
Côte-des-Neiges– Notre-Dame-de-Grâce	Côte-des-Neiges	Stephanie Valenzuela	Émilie Brière		
Côte-des-Neiges– Notre-Dame-de-Grâce	Darlington	Stephanie Valenzuela	Milany Thiagarajah		
Côte-des-Neiges– Notre-Dame-de-Grâce	Loyola	Stephanie Valenzuela	Alexandre Teodoresco		
Côte-des-Neiges– Notre-Dame-de-Grâce	Notre-Dame-de-Grâce	Stephanie Valenzuela	Peter McQueen		
Côte-des-Neiges– Notre-Dame-de-Grâce	Snowdon	Stephanie Valenzuela	Sonny Moroz		
L'Île-Bizard– Sainte-Geneviève	Denis-Benjamin-Viger	Danielle Myrand		Alain Wilson	
L'Île-Bizard– Sainte-Geneviève	Jacques-Bizard	Danielle Myrand		Richard Bélanger	
L'Île-Bizard– Sainte-Geneviève	Pierre-Foretier	Danielle Myrand		Julie Forgues	
L'Île-Bizard– Sainte-Geneviève	Sainte-Geneviève	Danielle Myrand		Christopher Little	
Lachine	Du Canal	Julie-Pascale Provost	Dominic Roussel	Nancy Berthelot	
Lachine	Fort-Rolland	Julie-Pascale Provost	Dominic Roussel	Jacques Filion	
Lachine	J.-Émery-Provost	Julie-Pascale Provost	Dominic Roussel	Ludovic Fermely	
LaSalle	Cecil-P.-Newman	Nancy Blanchet	Laura Palestini	Bisma Ansari	Josée Troilo
LaSalle	Sault-Saint-Louis	Nancy Blanchet	Richard Deschamps	Daniela Romano	Benoit Auger
Mercier– Hochelaga-Maisonneuve	Hochelaga	Chantal Gagnon	Sarah V. Doyon		
Mercier– Hochelaga-Maisonneuve	Louis-Riel	Chantal Gagnon	Alba Stella Zuniga Ramos		
Mercier– Hochelaga-Maisonneuve	Maisonneuve–Longue-Pointe	Chantal Gagnon	Alexandre Devaux-Guizani		
Mercier– Hochelaga-Maisonneuve	Tétreaultville	Chantal Gagnon	Julien Hénault-Ratelle		
Montréal-Nord	Marie-Clarac	Christine Black	Youssef Hariri	Jean Marc Poirier	
Montréal-Nord	Ovide-Clermont	Christine Black	Chantal Rossi	Philippe Thermidor	
Outremont	Claude-Ryan	Caroline Braun		Georgia Haloulos	
Outremont	Jeanne-Sauvé	Caroline Braun		Maude Choko	
Outremont	Joseph-Beaubien	Caroline Braun		Mercedez Plante	
Outremont	Robert-Bourassa	Caroline Braun		Amélie Cliche	
Pierrefonds-Roxboro	Bois-de-Liesse	Dimitrios (Jim) Beis	Benoit Langevin	Louise Leroux	
Pierrefonds-Roxboro	Cap-Saint-Jacques	Dimitrios (Jim) Beis	Sophie Mohsen	Chahi (Sharkie) Tarakjian	
Le Plateau-Mont-Royal	De Lorimier	Cathy Wong	Maeva Vilain	Laurence Parent	
Le Plateau-Mont-Royal	Jeanne-Mance	Cathy Wong	Alex Norris	Gabriel Fortin	
Le Plateau-Mont-Royal	Mile-End	Cathy Wong	Marie Plourde	Marie Sterlin	
Rivière-des-Prairies– Pointe-aux-Trembles	La Pointe-aux-Prairies	Denis Pelletier	Diana Varela	Gerlando Guarraggi	
Rivière-des-Prairies– Pointe-aux-Trembles	Pointe-aux-Trembles	Denis Pelletier	Gabrielle Rousseau-Bélanger	Marie-Claude Baril	
Rivière-des-Prairies– Pointe-aux-Trembles	Rivière-des-Prairies	Denis Pelletier	Giovanni Rapanà	Nathalie Pierre-Antoine	
Rosemont– La Petite-Patrie	Étienne-Desmarteau	François Limoges	Ericka Alneus		
Rosemont– La Petite-Patrie	Marie-Victorin	François Limoges	Jocelyn Pauzé		
Rosemont– La Petite-Patrie	Saint-Édouard	François Limoges	Josefina Blanco		
Rosemont– La Petite-Patrie	Vieux-Rosemont	François Limoges	Olivier Demers-Dubé		
Saint-Laurent	Côte-de-Liesse	Alan DeSousa	Vana Nazarian	Jacques Cohen	
Saint-Laurent	Norman-McLaren	Alan DeSousa	Aref Salem	Annie Gagnier	
Saint-Léonard	Saint-Léonard-Est	Dominic Perri	Arij El Korbi	Linda Paquin	
Saint-Léonard	Saint-Léonard-Ouest	Dominic Perri	Mauro Barone	Gemma Marchione	
Le Sud-Ouest	Saint-Henri-Est–Petite-Bourgogne– Pointe-Saint-Charles–Griffintown	Véronique Fournier	Catherine Houbart	Jonathan Burnham	
Le Sud-Ouest	Saint-Paul–Émard– Saint-Henri-Ouest	Véronique Fournier	Élise Tanguay	Nicolas Jolicoeur	
Verdun	Champlain–L'Île-des-Sœurs	Céline-Audrey Beauregard	Andréanne Moreau	André Julien	Michèle Tremblay
Verdun	Desmarchais-Crawford	Céline-Audrey Beauregard	Sterling Downey	Stefana Lamasanu	Benoit Gratton
Ville-Marie	Peter-McGill	(Mayor of Montreal)	Leslie Roberts		
Ville-Marie	Saint-Jacques	(Mayor of Montreal)	Claude Pinard		
Ville-Marie	Sainte-Marie	(Mayor of Montreal)	Christopher McCray		
Villeray–Saint-Michel– Parc-Extension	François-Perrault	Jean François Lalonde	Sylvain Ouellet		
Villeray–Saint-Michel– Parc-Extension	Parc-Extension	Jean François Lalonde	Elvira Carhuallanqui		
Villeray–Saint-Michel– Parc-Extension	Saint-Michel	Jean François Lalonde	Josué Corvil		
Villeray–Saint-Michel– Parc-Extension	Villeray	Jean François Lalonde	Martine Musau Muele		

=== Ahuntsic-Cartierville ===
Electoral District	Eligible voters	Position	Turnout	Candidates						Incumbent
Electoral District	Eligible voters	Position	Turnout	Projet Montréal	Ensemble Montréal	Transition Montréal	Action Montréal	Futur Montréal	Independent	Incumbent
—	86,775	Borough mayor	40.43%	Émilie Thuillier; 14,007 (41.25%)	Maude Théroux-Séguin; 14,977 (44.11%)		Stefan Leblanc; 4,971 (14.64%)			Émilie Thuillier
Ahuntsic	21,821	City councillor	46.53%	Nathalie Goulet; 4,249 (42.81%)	Justine Lalande-Church; 3,935 (39.65%)	Anh Khoi Do; 488 (4.92%)	Georges Chartier; 1,126 (11.35%)	Basile Nakouzi; 127 (1.28%)		Nathalie Goulet
Bordeaux-Cartierville	21,362	City councillor	30.93%	Anne-Marie Kabongo; 1,600 (24.92%)	Effie Giannou; 3,636 (56.63%)	Marc Shakour; 284 (4.42%)	Alex Douillard; 753 (11.73%)	Raouf Girgis; 123 (1.92%)	Metodi Igorov; 25 (0.39%)	Effie Giannou
Saint-Sulpice	23,910	City councillor	39.05%	Julie Roy; 3,373 (37.02%)	Victor Esposito; 3,589 (39.39%)	Benoît Lemire; 518 (5.69%)	Silvana Cosentino; 1,442 (15.83%)	Carenne Ahiba; 189 (2.07%)		Julie Roy
Sault-au-Récollet	19,682	City councillor	45.80%	Carla Beauvais; 3,428 (39.18%)	Joanne Lacombe; 3,366 (38.47%)	Miro Bataille; 574 (6.56%)	Johanne Bouchard; 1,192 (13.62%)	Margarettha Pierre; 190 (2.17%)		Jérôme Normand

=== Anjou ===
Electoral District	Eligible voters	Position	Turnout	Candidates				Incumbent
Electoral District	Eligible voters	Position	Turnout	Projet Montréal	Équipe Anjou	Transition Montréal	Action Montréal	Incumbent
—	28,288	Borough mayor	39.18%	Alex Megelas; 1,820 (17.02%)	Luis Miranda; 7,485 (70.01%)	David de Laurière; 495 (4.63%)	Ernesto Almeida Acuna; 891 (8.33%)	Luis Miranda
—	28,288	City councillor	39.15%	Jean Louis Sabin; 2,120 (20.06%)	Andrée Hénault; 7,289 (68.97%)		Gelen Blanco Chambro; 1,159 (10.97%)	Andrée Hénault
Centre	10,579	Borough councillor	39.15%	Smail Ouendi; 781 (19.80%)	Kristine Marsolais; 2,795 (70.87%)		Philippe Gouin; 368 (9.33%)	Kristine Marsolais
East	8,372	Borough councillor	38.37%	Janny Gaspard; 770 (24.95%)	Richard Leblanc; 1,818 (58.91%)	Camille Nolin; 152 (4.93%)	Claudia Hernandez Viera-Montes De Oca; 346 (11.21%)	Richard Leblanc
West	9,337	Borough councillor	39.87%	Mélissa Cloutier; 662 (18.64%)	Marie Josée Dubé; 2,523 (71.03%)		Beatrice Ethier; 367 (10.33%)	Marie Josée Dubé

=== Côte-des-Neiges–Notre-Dame-de-Grâce ===
Electoral District	Eligible voters	Position	Turnout	Candidates						Incumbent
Electoral District	Eligible voters	Position	Turnout	Projet Montréal	Ensemble Montréal	Transition Montréal	Action Montréal	Futur Montréal	Independent	Incumbent
—	98,687	Borough mayor	33.70%	Gracia Kasoki Katahwa; 10,412 (31.93%)	Stephanie Valenzuela; 16,452 (50.46%)	Marek Orsovy; 2,749 (8.43%)	Guy McDonald; 2,064 (6.33%)	Gulnar Mousa; 929 (2.85%)		Gracia Kasoki Katahwa
Côte-des-Neiges	16,858	City councillor	32.17%	Émilie Brière; 2,128 (39.96%)	Yvonne Nguyen; 2,120 (39.81%)	Carol-Ann Hoyte; 485 (9.11%)	Mara Hermione Pierre; 355 (6.67%)	Stefani Novick; 106 (1.99%)	Kamala Jegatheeswaran; 131 (2.46%)	Magda Popeanu
Darlington	17,955	City councillor	28.25%	Nora Chénier-Jones; 1,147 (23.61%)	Milany Thiagarajah; 2,545 (52.39%)	Miguel-Angel Diaz; 312 (6.42%)	Marie-Christine Desmarest; 303 (6.24%)	Glenn Opendo; 551 (11.34%)		Stephanie Valenzuela
Loyola	21,394	City councillor	32.92%	Despina Sourias; 1,718 (24.82%)	Alexandre Teodoresco; 2,863 (41.37%)	Renate Betts; 774 (11.18%)	Neal Roy Mukherjee; 318 (4.59%)	Svetlana Chernienko; 235 (3.40%)	Alex Trainman Montagano; 1,013 (14.64%)	Despina Sourias
Notre-Dame-de-Grâce	21,508	City councillor	42.58%	Peter McQueen; 4,339 (48.35%)	Peter Shatilla; 3,004 (33.47%)	Jean-François Filion; 1,303 (14.52%)		Anthony Jr. D'Alesio; 329 (3.67%)		Peter McQueen
Snowdon	20,972	City councillor	30.88%	Clément Badra; 1,502 (24.02%)	Sonny Moroz; 3,857 (61.68%)	Jérôme Bugel; 619 (9.90%)		Julian D'Alesio; 275 (4.40%)		Sonny Moroz

=== L'Île-Bizard–Sainte-Geneviève ===
Electoral District	Eligible voters	Position	Turnout	Candidates				Incumbent
Electoral District	Eligible voters	Position	Turnout	Projet Montréal	Ensemble Montréal	Transition Montréal	Other	Incumbent
—	14,016	Borough mayor	39.95%	Danielle Myrand; 2,901 (53.13%)	Doug Hurley; 2,559 (46.87%)			Doug Hurley
Denis-Benjamin-Viger	3,803	Borough councillor	46.49%	Alain Wilson; 913 (53.39%)	Patricia McIntyre; 797 (46.61%)			Alain Wilson
Jacques-Bizard	3,789	Borough councillor	39.69%	Guillaume Côté; 714 (48.74%)	Richard Bélanger; 722 (49.28%)		Sandra Jean Leonard (Futur Montréal); 29 (1.98%)	Richard Bélanger
Pierre-Foretier	3,903	Borough councillor	41.51%	Stéphane Ritchot; 733 (46.36%)	Julie Forgues; 848 (53.64%)			Danielle Myrand
Sainte-Geneviève	2,521	Borough councillor	27.89%	Caroline Arslanian; 160 (23.63%)	Christopher Little; 279 (41.21%)	Avi Karp; 22 (3.25%)	Philippe Voisard (Independent); 216 (31.91%)	Suzanne Marceau

=== Lachine ===
Electoral District	Eligible voters	Position	Turnout	Candidates						Incumbent
Electoral District	Eligible voters	Position	Turnout	Projet Montréal	Ensemble Montréal	Transition Montréal	Action Montréal	Futur Montréal	Independent	Incumbent
—	31,142	Borough mayor	35.95%	Maja Vodanovic; 5,047 (46.21%)	Julie-Pascale Provost; 5,058 (46.31%)		Gary Tremblay; 817 (7.48%)			Maja Vodanovic
—	31,142	City councillor	35.96%	Myriam Grondin; 4,758 (44.05%)	Dominic Roussel; 4,790 (44.34%)	Christian Rouleau; 1,253 (11.60%)				Vicki Grondin
Du Canal	11,533	Borough councillor	31.75%	Chad Polito; 1,190 (34.13%)	Nancy Berthelot; 1,762 (50.53%)	Mike Wadsworth; 306 (8.78%)		Justin Kausel; 97 (2.78%)	André Lavigne; 132 (3.79%)	Micheline Rouleau
Fort-Rolland	9,940	Borough councillor	46.49%	Jacques Filion; 2,269 (50.10%)	Geneviève Leduc; 1,969 (43.48%)	Mokhtar Liamini; 188 (4.15%)		Chantal Sampson; 103 (2.27%)		Michèle Flannery
J.-Émery-Provost	9,669	Borough councillor	30.34%	Pilar Hernandez Romero; 1,008 (35.29%)	Ludovic Fermely; 1,242 (43.49%)	Alexandrah Cardona-Fortin; 272 (9.52%)	Sidney Charles; 260 (9.10%)	Michael Nana Opoku-Ware; 74 (2.59%)		Younes Boukala

=== LaSalle ===
Electoral District	Eligible voters	Position	Turnout	Candidates				Incumbent
Electoral District	Eligible voters	Position	Turnout	Projet Montréal	LaSalle Team	Transition Montréal	Action Montréal	Incumbent
—	53,161	Borough mayor	27.98%	Jean-Louis Fozin; 1,335 (9.30%)	Nancy Blanchet; 9,604 (66.87%)	Matthew MacDonald; 1,794 (12.49%)	Francisco Moreno; 1,629 (11.34%)	Nancy Blanchet
Cecil-P.-Newman	25,115	City councillor	23.47%	Raymonde Djabia Gomis; 645 (11.45%)	Laura Palestini; 3,359 (59.65%)	James Newman; 759 (13.48%)	Eric Tremblay; 868 (15.41%)	Laura Palestini
Cecil-P.-Newman	25,115	Borough councillor I	23.48%	Kadiatou Diallo; 560 (10.14%)	Bisma Ansari; 3,304 (59.80%)	Debra Dennis; 730 (13.21%)	Josée Pharand; 931 (16.85%)	Michel Noël
Cecil-P.-Newman	25,115	Borough councillor II	23.54%	James Ébongué; 557 (9.92%)	Josée Troilo; 3,379 (60.17%)	Oren Weber; 632 (11.25%)	Stéphanie Corral; 1,048 (18.66%)	Josée Troilo
Sault-Saint-Louis	28,046	City councillor	31.51%	Arnaud Beaudelet; 991 (11.61%)	Richard Deschamps; 5,380 (63.04%)	Yosef Azzouni; 1,119 (13.11%)	Patricia Jiménez; 1,044 (12.23%)	Richard Deschamps
Sault-Saint-Louis	28,046	Borough councillor I	31.38%	Renée Lemay; 974 (11.49%)	Daniela Romano; 5,545 (65.42%)	Anaïs Ruiz; 1,151 (13.58%)	Ihor Kravchuk; 806 (9.51%)	Daniela Romano
Sault-Saint-Louis	28,046	Borough councillor II	31.46%	Soheir Naimi; 861 (10.13%)	Benoit Auger; 5,571 (65.54%)	Allison Sklar; 1,153 (13.56%)	Francisco Moreno-Molina; 915 (10.76%)	Benoit Auger

=== Mercier–Hochelaga-Maisonneuve ===
Electoral District	Eligible voters	Position	Turnout	Candidates						Incumbent
Electoral District	Eligible voters	Position	Turnout	Projet Montréal	Ensemble Montréal	Transition Montréal	Action Montréal	Futur Montréal	Independent	Incumbent
—	95,680	Borough mayor	42.08%	Alia Hassan-Cournol; 12,261 (31.27%)	Chantal Gagnon; 17,168 (43.79%)	Anaïs Houde; 4,753 (12.12%)	Jean Pierre Dakouo; 5,024 (12.81%)			Pierre Lessard-Blais
Hochelaga	23,089	City councillor	45.07%	Sarah V. Doyon; 5,171 (58.69%)	~~Alexandre Giasson~~; Candidacy withdrawn	David Champagne; 2,138 (21.82%)	Robert Sévigny; 1,480 (15.10%)	Nzelo Bamba; 430 (4.39%)		Éric Alan Caldwell
Louis-Riel	21,867	City councillor	42.88%	Paul Jacques-Mignault; 2,549 (27.96%)	Alba Stella Zuniga Ramos; 4,643 (50.93%)	Malo Harnez; 494 (5.42%)	Alain Nault; Co-candidate for Gilbert Thibodeau; 1,297 (14.23%)	Ismela Zamor Alexandre; 133 (1.46%)		Alba Stella Zuniga Ramos
Maisonneuve–Longue-Pointe	24,289	City councillor	42.39%	Jérôme Leclerc; 3,321 (33.04%)	Alexandre Devaux-Guizani; Co-candidate for Soraya Martinez Ferrada; 3,916 (38.96%)	Ljupka Mirchovska; 1,207 (12.01%)	Daniel St-Hilaire; 1,287 (12.80%)	Luc Ménard; 218 (2.17%)	Sherman Samuel; 102 (1.01%)	Alia Hassan-Cournol
Tétreaultville	26,435	City councillor	38.66%	Suzie Miron; 2,623 (26.42%)	Julien Hénault-Ratelle; 5,215 (52.52%)	Aaron Cohen; 413 (4.16%)	Rima El-Cheikh; 1,349 (13.59%)	Giselle Fernandez Molina; 329 (3.31%)		Julien Hénault-Ratelle

=== Montréal-Nord ===
Electoral District	Eligible voters	Position	Turnout	Candidates						Incumbent
Electoral District	Eligible voters	Position	Turnout	Projet Montréal	Ensemble Montréal	Transition Montréal	Action Montréal	Futur Montréal	Independent	Incumbent
—	49,748	Borough mayor	27.99%	Roger Petit-Frère; 1,924 (14.60%)	Christine Black; 8,148 (61.82%)		Anastasia Marcelin; 2,452 (18.60%)		Salih Akpinar; 656 (4.98%)	Christine Black
Marie-Clarac	27,179	City councillor	29.29%	Fatima Gabriela Salazar Gomez; 1,477 (19.53%)	Youssef Hariri; 3,581 (47.34%)	Catherine Gauvin; 662 (8.75%)	Sidali Zebardi; 1,234 (16.31%)	Djudy Vilma; 408 (5.39%)	Joseph Wa Ngoie Ngoie; 202 (2.67%)	Vacant
Marie-Clarac	27,179	Borough councillor	29.18%	Amine Difallah; 1,364 (18.27%)	Jean Marc Poirier; 3,771 (50.52%)	Roland Franklin; 288 (3.86%)	Jennefer Rose Johana Numa; 1,478 (19.80%)	Brenda Espinal Hernandez; 563 (7.54%)		Jean Marc Poirier
Ovide-Clermont	22,569	City councillor	26.59%	Annie-Claude Beaudry; 1,264 (23.69%)	Chantal Rossi; 3,508 (65.75%)		~~Samantha Vixama~~; Candidacy withdrawn	Shukria Lodin; 563 (10.55%)		Chantal Rossi
Ovide-Clermont	22,569	Borough councillor	26.39%	Patrick Mpinga-Iyenda; 759 (13.73%)	Philippe Thermidor; 3,023 (54.69%)	Simon Charbonneau; 414 (7.49%)	Rocky Junior Mancini; 1,026 (18.56%)	Anika Leblanc; 306 (5.54%)		Philippe Thermidor

=== Outremont ===
Electoral District	Eligible voters	Position	Turnout	Candidates				Incumbent
Electoral District	Eligible voters	Position	Turnout	Projet Montréal	Ensemble Montréal	Transition Montréal	Other	Incumbent
—	16,967	Borough mayor	55.87%	Alain Bakayoko; 2,310 (24.77%)	Caroline Braun; 6,703 (71.89%)		Jennifer Jody (Action Montréal); 311 (3.34%)	Laurent Desbois
Claude-Ryan	4,477	Borough councillor	58.61%	Jax Jacobsen; 384 (14.90%)	Geoffrey King; 711 (27.59%)	Rosie Magnan; 131 (5.08%)	Georgia Haloulos (Independent); 1,351 (52.43%)	Mindy Pollak
Jeanne-Sauvé	4,053	Borough councillor	53.98%	Anne Roudaut; 486 (22.66%)	Maude Choko; 1,350 (62.94%)	Dónal Sean Gill; 123 (5.73%)	Eric Blond (Independent); 186 (8.67%)	Caroline Braun
Joseph-Beaubien	4,876	Borough councillor	57.69%	Melissa Turp-Yonezawa; 556 (19.94%)	Mercedez Plante; 1,357 (48.66%)	Marika Lalime; 113 (4.05%)	Céline Forget (Parti Outremont); 763 (27.36%)	Valérie Patreau
Robert-Bourassa	3,561	Borough councillor	51.73%	Laurence Morel; 409 (22.58%)	Amélie Cliche; 1,333 (73.61%)	Felix Gauthier; 69 (3.81%)		Marie Potvin

=== Pierrefonds-Roxboro ===
Electoral District	Eligible voters	Position	Turnout	Candidates			Incumbent
Electoral District	Eligible voters	Position	Turnout	Projet Montréal	Ensemble Montréal	Transition Montréal	Incumbent
—	48,726	Borough mayor	27.82%	Rébecca Michaëlle Daniel; 2,105 (16.02%)	Dimitrios (Jim) Beis; 11,037 (83.98%)		Dimitrios (Jim) Beis
Bois-de-Liesse	25,301	City councillor	29.58%	Madjou Diallo; 1,248 (17.31%)	Benoit Langevin; 5,394 (74.80%)	Zachary Williams; 569 (7.89%)	Benoit Langevin
Bois-de-Liesse	25,301	Borough councillor	29.59%	Joseph-Henri Codère; 1,177 (16.37%)	Louise Leroux; 5,457 (75.90%)	Mats Magnusson; 556 (7.73%)	Louise Leroux
Cap-Saint-Jacques	23,425	City councillor	25.92%	Fadima Touré; 733 (12.46%)	Sophie Mohsen; 4,670 (79.38%)	Aaron Green; 480 (8.16%)	Catherine Clément-Talbot
Cap-Saint-Jacques	23,425	Borough councillor	25.92%	Louis-Philippe Codère; 848 (14.46%)	Chahi (Sharkie) Tarakjian; 4,474 (76.28%)	Amy McDonald; 543 (9.26%)	Chahi (Sharkie) Tarakjian

=== Le Plateau-Mont-Royal ===
Electoral District	Eligible voters	Position	Turnout	Candidates						Incumbent
Electoral District	Eligible voters	Position	Turnout	Projet Montréal	Ensemble Montréal	Transition Montréal	Action Montréal	Futur Montréal	Independent	Incumbent
—	64,966	Borough mayor	48.09%	Cathy Wong; 17,729 (58.27%)	Jean Beaudoin; 8,130 (26.72%)	Maggie Bolduc; 4,567 (15.01%)				Luc Rabouin
De Lorimier	22,374	City councillor	51.90%	Maeva Vilain; Co-candidate for Luc Rabouin; 7,262 (63.35%)	Alexander Roberton; 2,409 (21.02%)	Jean-François Bernier; 1,135 (9.90%)	Andréa Lachapelle; 572 (4.99%)		Jocelyn Simon Daigle; 85 (0.74%)	Marianne Giguère
De Lorimier	22,374	Borough councillor	51.90%	Laurence Parent; 7,001 (61.24%)	Isabelle Laurier; 2,581 (22.58%)	Charles Gao; 1,179 (10.31%)	Pascal Antonin; 560 (4.90%)	Isabelle M'Bengue; 112 (0.98%)		Laurence Parent
Jeanne-Mance	21,125	City councillor	40.98%	Alex Norris; 4,259 (50.65%)	Lucilia Santos; 2,348 (27.92%)	Shirley Barnea; 1,456 (17.31%)			Robert Fradette; 346 (4.11%)	Alex Norris
Jeanne-Mance	21,125	Borough councillor	40.92%	Gabriel Fortin; 4,387 (52.44%)	Sébastien Joannette; 2,455 (29.35%)	Vincent Stephen-Ong; 1,328 (15.88%)	~~Gabriel Houle~~; Candidacy withdrawn	Nicole Barry; 195 (2.33%)		Maeva Vilain
Mile-End	21,467	City councillor	51.14%	Marie Plourde; 6,468 (59.88%)	Lemonia Strapatsas; 2,216 (20.51%)	Daniel Vazquez; 1,542 (14.28%)	Sonia Valente; 576 (5.33%)			Marie Plourde
Mile-End	21,467	Borough councillor	51.12%	Marie Sterlin; 6,266 (58.73%)	Sébastien Corbeil; 2,719 (25.48%)	Nathe Perrone; 1,492 (13.98%)		Sarah M'Bengue; 193 (1.81%)		Marie Sterlin

=== Rivière-des-Prairies–Pointe-aux-Trembles ===
Electoral District	Eligible voters	Position	Turnout	Candidates					Incumbent
Electoral District	Eligible voters	Position	Turnout	Projet Montréal	Ensemble Montréal	Action Montréal	Futur Montréal	Other	Incumbent
—	79,736	Borough mayor	35.04%	Caroline Bourgeois; 9,100 (33.70%)	Denis Pelletier; 11,904 (44.09%)	Dora Angiuli; 5,014 (18.57%)	Jaël Régine Chirhalwirwa; 983 (3.64%)		Caroline Bourgeois
La Pointe-aux-Prairies	27,131	City councillor	35.46%	Lisa Christensen; 2,572 (27.59%)	Diana Varela; 4,463 (47.88%)	Rachel Galati; 1,792 (19.22%)	Fleurence Lubin; 495 (5.31%)		Lisa Christensen
La Pointe-aux-Prairies	27,131	Borough councillor	35.53%	Daphney Colin; 2,762 (29.61%)	Gerlando Guarraggi; 4,412 (47.30%)	Louis Chandonnet; 1,891 (20.27%)	Michel Labrecque; 263 (2.82%)		Daphney Colin
Pointe-aux-Trembles	25,398	City councillor	37.07%	Virginie Journeau; 3,419 (37.69%)	Gabrielle Rousseau-Bélanger; 3,891 (42.89%)	Mildred Mathieu; 1,511 (16.66%)	Jean-François Agoh; 250 (2.76%)		Virginie Journeau
Pointe-aux-Trembles	25,398	Borough councillor	37.10%	Marie-Claude Baril; 3,579 (39.40%)	Laurie Dupuis; 3,503 (38.56%)	Marie-Claude Séguin; 1,632 (17.97%)	Konan Kan Dally Yao; 230 (2.53%)	Ahmed Hallouli (Independent); 140 (1.54%)	Marie-Claude Baril
Rivière-des-Prairies	27,207	City councillor	32.69%	Joseph Paglia; 1,503 (17.53%)	Giovanni Rapanà; 4,905 (57.21%)	Antonio Pitoscia; 1,603 (18.70%)	Steve Voltaire; 377 (4.40%)	Jordan St. James (Transition Montréal); 186 (2.17%)	Giovanni Rapanà
Rivière-des-Prairies	27,207	Borough councillor	32.45%	Johnley Pierre; 1,097 (12.93%)	Nathalie Pierre-Antoine; 5,201 (61.28%)	Nadia Scanzano; 1,963 (23.13%)	Flore Koudjou; 226 (2.66%)		Nathalie Pierre-Antoine

=== Rosemont–La Petite-Patrie ===
Electoral District	Eligible voters	Position	Turnout	Candidates					Incumbent
Electoral District	Eligible voters	Position	Turnout	Projet Montréal	Ensemble Montréal	Transition Montréal	Action Montréal	Futur Montréal	Incumbent
—	97,289	Borough mayor	49.12%	François Limoges; 24,187 (51.68%)	Sandra O'Connor; 13,221 (28.25%)	Luc Corbin; 6,009 (12.84%)	Joao Costa; 3,380 (7.22%)		François Limoges
Étienne-Desmarteau	22,162	City councillor	53.61%	Ericka Alneus; 6,467 (55.39%)	Rémy Deloume; 2,804 (24.02%)	Manouane Beauchamp; 1,341 (11.49%)	Brigitte Gauthier; 947 (8.11%)	Sabine Charles; 116 (0.99%)	Ericka Alneus
Marie-Victorin	21,934	City councillor	41.21%	Jocelyn Pauzé; 3,814 (43.33%)	Ntwari Songa; 3,268 (37.21%)	Étienne Pelletier; 784 (8.91%)	Marwan Takchi; 761 (8.64%)	Raïssa Marlène Niangoran; 176 (2.00%)	Jocelyn Pauzé
Saint-Édouard	25,120	City councillor	52.91%	Josefina Blanco; 7,745 (60.05%)	Luciano Recine; 2,420 (18.76%)	Simon Dubois; 2,473 (19.17%)		Yaya Marie-Thérèse Aïssi; 260 (2.02%)	Josefina Blanco
Vieux-Rosemont	28,073	City councillor	48.33%	Olivier Demers-Dubé; 6,490 (49.41%)	Lorraine Pintal; 4,778 (36.38%)	Pascale Corriveau; 1,513 (11.52%)		N'Dri Anker Agoh; 353 (2.69%)	Dominique Ollivier

=== Saint-Laurent ===
Electoral District	Eligible voters	Position	Turnout	Candidates			Incumbent
Electoral District	Eligible voters	Position	Turnout	Projet Montréal	Ensemble Montréal	Transition Montréal	Incumbent
—	63,937	Borough mayor	27.61%	Youssef Shoufan; 2,274 (13.41%)	Alan DeSousa; 12,700 (74.91%)	Olivier Labrèche; 1,980 (11.68%)	Alan DeSousa
Côte-de-Liesse	36,281	City councillor	28.60%	Matisse Nadeau-Décarie; 1,720 (17.36%)	Vana Nazarian; 7,226 (72.94%)	Livia James; 961 (9.70%)	Vana Nazarian
Côte-de-Liesse	36,281	Borough councillor	28.63%	Ty Jeevaratnam; 1,496 (15.03%)	Jacques Cohen; 7,321 (73.53%)	Jules Fortin-Monastesse; 1,139 (11.44%)	Jacques Cohen
Norman-McLaren	27,656	City councillor	25.89%	Robertine Tchouga; 1,238 (18.46%)	Aref Salem; 4,497 (67.07%)	Pascal Dubois; 970 (14.47%)	Aref Salem
Norman-McLaren	27,656	Borough councillor	26.07%	Nilufar Mamad; 1,225 (18.32%)	Annie Gagnier; 4,556 (68.14%)	Alain Ackad; 905 (13.54%)	Annie Gagnier

=== Saint-Léonard ===
Electoral District	Eligible voters	Position	Turnout	Candidates					Incumbent
Electoral District	Eligible voters	Position	Turnout	Projet Montréal	Ensemble Montréal	Transition Montréal	Équipe St-Léonard	Independent	Incumbent
—	49,878	Borough mayor	30.24%	Luckny Guerrier; 1,374 (9.62%)	Dominic Perri; 6,392 (44.74%)		Suzanne De Larochellière; 5,858 (41.00%)	Pasqualino Borsellino; 361 (2.53%)	Michel Bissonnet
—	49,878	Borough mayor	30.24%	Luckny Guerrier; 1,374 (9.62%)	Dominic Perri; 6,392 (44.74%)		Suzanne De Larochellière; 5,858 (41.00%)	Philippe Tessier; 302 (2.11%)	Michel Bissonnet
Saint-Léonard-Est	22,670	City councillor	31.03%	Abdellah Azzouz; 786 (11.90%)	Arij El Korbi; 2,913 (44.09%)	Alexia Corsillo; 425 (6.43%)	Nathalie Vallée; 2,483 (37.58%)		Angela Gentile
Saint-Léonard-Est	22,670	Borough councillor	30.97%	Loïc de Fabritus; 775 (11.91%)	Linda Paquin; 3,748 (57.58%)		Amina Bahri; 1,986 (30.51%)		Arij El Korbi
Saint-Léonard-Ouest	27,208	City councillor	29.44%	Rose Camille; 826 (10.99%)	Gabriel Retta; 3,057 (40.66%)	Amy McAloon; 270 (3.59%)	Mauro Barone; 3,365 (44.76%)		Dominic Perri
Saint-Léonard-Ouest	27,208	Borough councillor	29.42%	Edline Henri; 870 (11.67%)	Gemma Marchione; 3,425 (45.94%)		Francesco Lavalle; 3,161 (42.40%)		Suzanne De Larochellière

=== Le Sud-Ouest ===
Electoral District	Eligible voters	Position	Turnout	Candidates					Incumbent
Electoral District	Eligible voters	Position	Turnout	Projet Montréal	Ensemble Montréal	Transition Montréal	Action Montréal	Futur Montréal	Incumbent
—	58,938	Borough mayor	35.48%	Véronique Fournier; 8,832 (43.30%)	Thierry Daraize; 5,823 (28.55%)	Shant Karabajak; 3,767 (18.47%)	Mehdi Semsari; 1,525 (7.48%)	Matthew Kerr; 450 (2.21%)	Benoit Dorais
Saint-Henri-Est–Petite-Bourgogne–Pointe-Saint-Charles–Griffintown	32,462	City councillor	34.53%	Catherine Houbart; 4,503 (41.53%)	Shane Thompson; 3,666 (33.81%)	Thom Seivewright; 2,239 (20.65%)		Keeton Clarke; 436 (4.02%)	Craig Sauvé
Saint-Henri-Est–Petite-Bourgogne–Pointe-Saint-Charles–Griffintown	32,462	Borough councillor	34.56%	Jonathan Burnham; 4,157 (38.31%)	Enrico Pace; 3,621 (33.37%)	Tina Naim; 2,698 (24.87%)		Jason Dery; 374 (3.45%)	Tan Shan Li
Saint-Paul–Émard–Saint-Henri-Ouest	26,476	City councillor	36.69%	Élise Tanguay; 3,818 (40.45%)	Estelle Lokrou; 2,257 (23.91%)	Samah Khandker; Co-candidate for Craig Sauvé; 2,221 (23.53%)	Mario Giguère; 936 (9.92%)	Mauricio Peña; 207 (2.19%)	Alain Vaillancourt
Saint-Paul–Émard–Saint-Henri-Ouest	26,476	Borough councillor	36.65%	Nicolas Jolicoeur; 4,360 (47.09%)	Princilia Djombo; 2,393 (25.85%)	Christopher Hall; 2,216 (23.93%)		Rodrigue Mehou Hounsou; 290 (3.13%)	Anne-Marie Sigouin

=== Verdun ===
Electoral District	Eligible voters	Position	Turnout	Candidates					Incumbent
Electoral District	Eligible voters	Position	Turnout	Projet Montréal	Ensemble Montréal	Transition Montréal	Action Montréal	Other	Incumbent
—	49,306	Borough mayor	42.34%	Céline-Audrey Beauregard; 8,746 (43.49%)	Geneviève Desautels; 8,698 (43.25%)	Christopher Steel; 2,665 (13.25%)			Marie-Andrée Mauger
Champlain–L'Île-des-Sœurs	28,469	City councillor	41.26%	Véronique Tremblay; 4,288 (37.35%)	Andréanne Moreau; 5,132 (44.70%)	Christopher Trudeau; 1,288 (11.22%)	Lise Vallée; 631 (5.50%)	Parvesh Chainani (Futur Montréal); 143 (1.25%)	Véronique Tremblay
Champlain–L'Île-des-Sœurs	28,469	Borough councillor I	41.23%	Jean-Pierre (JP) Serra; 4,421 (39.01%)	André Julien; 4,870 (42.98%)	Julie St-Onge; 1,516 (13.38%)		André Loiselle (Independent); 525 (4.63%)	Céline-Audrey Beauregard
Champlain–L'Île-des-Sœurs	28,469	Borough councillor II	41.27%	Logan Littlefield; 4,232 (37.48%)	Michèle Tremblay; 5,701 (50.49%)	Victor Williams; 1,359 (12.04%)			Enrique Machado
Desmarchais-Crawford	20,837	City councillor	44.15%	Sterling Downey; 4,427 (49.36%)	Jean-François Guay; 2,670 (29.77%)	Jean-Nicolas Bossé; 1,375 (15.33%)	Alain Plouffe; 497 (5.54%)		Sterling Downey
Desmarchais-Crawford	20,837	Borough councillor I	44.29%	Stefana Lamasanu; 3,820 (42.97%)	Nathalie Cavezzali; 3,095 (34.81%)	Laura Whelton; 1,319 (14.84%)		Rosalie Bélanger-Rioux (Independent); 656 (7.38%)	Benoit Gratton
Desmarchais-Crawford	20,837	Borough councillor II	44.11%	Benoit Gratton; 4,178 (47.46%)	André Dussault; 2,969 (33.73%)	François Pelletier; 1,656 (18.81%)			Kaïla Amaya Munro

=== Ville-Marie ===
Electoral District	Eligible voters	Position	Turnout	Candidates					Incumbent
Electoral District	Eligible voters	Position	Turnout	Projet Montréal	Ensemble Montréal	Transition Montréal	Action Montréal	Futur Montréal	Incumbent
Peter-McGill	22,298	City councillor	23.20%	Maryse Bouchard; 1,398 (27.95%)	Leslie Roberts; 2,832 (56.63%)	Danso; 560 (11.20%)		Cosimo La Rosa; 211 (4.22%)	Serge Sasseville
Saint-Jacques	20,729	City councillor	29.96%	Robert Beaudry; 2,472 (40.46%)	Claude Pinard; 2,495 (40.84%)	Sergio Da Silva; 596 (9.76%)	Pierre Guido; 457 (7.48%)	Jean-Pierre Khouzam; 89 (1.46%)	Robert Beaudry
Sainte-Marie	21,568	City councillor	39.33%	Christopher McCray; 3,826 (46.03%)	Daniel Vaudrin; 2,285 (27.49%)	Anurag Dhir; 1,139 (13.70%)	Clint Jody; 804 (9.67%)	Kathlen Jean; Co-candidate for Jean-François Kacou; 258 (3.10%)	Sophie Mauzerolle

=== Villeray–Saint-Michel–Parc-Extension ===
Electoral District	Eligible voters	Position	Turnout	Candidates						Incumbent
Electoral District	Eligible voters	Position	Turnout	Projet Montréal	Ensemble Montréal	Transition Montréal	Action Montréal	Futur Montréal	Independent	Incumbent
—	84,048	Borough mayor	37.33%	Jean François Lalonde; 15,328 (50.61%)	Sylvain Gariépy; 9,550 (31.53%)		Eric Jr Allen; 3,588 (11.85%)	Nounthia Renord; 1,819 (6.01%)		Laurence Lavigne Lalonde
François-Perrault	21,294	City councillor	34.72%	Sylvain Ouellet; 3,274 (45.61%)	Omaïma Rizqy; 2,037 (28.37%)	Naïma Mehennek; 902 (12.56%)	Hugo Levasseur; 774 (10.78%)	Julian Valls-Pietracupa; 192 (2.67%)		Sylvain Ouellet
Parc-Extension	18,743	City councillor	36.11%	Elvira Carhuallanqui; 2,482 (37.70%)	Mary Deros; 2,438 (37.03%)	Abdul Raziq Khan; 714 (10.84%)	Sandrina Costa; 524 (7.96%)	Mohammad Yousuf; 388 (5.89%)	Mostafa Ben Kirane (Independent); 38 (0.58%)	Mary Deros
Saint-Michel	20,842	City councillor	24.07%	Mohamed Maazami; 1,124 (23.42%)	Josué Corvil; 2,074 (43.21%)	Jason Louissaint; 419 (8.73%)	René-André Guillemette; 987 (20.56%)	John Deave Jacquelin; 196 (4.08%)		Josué Corvil
Villeray	23,169	City councillor	52.24%	Martine Musau Muele; 7,024 (59.02%)	Ariane Nadeau; 2,560 (21.51%)	Antoine Côté; 1,327 (11.15%)	Emanuel Costa; 831 (6.98%)	José Reyes; 160 (1.34%)		Martine Musau Muele
