= Île de la Visitation =

Island in Quebec, Canada

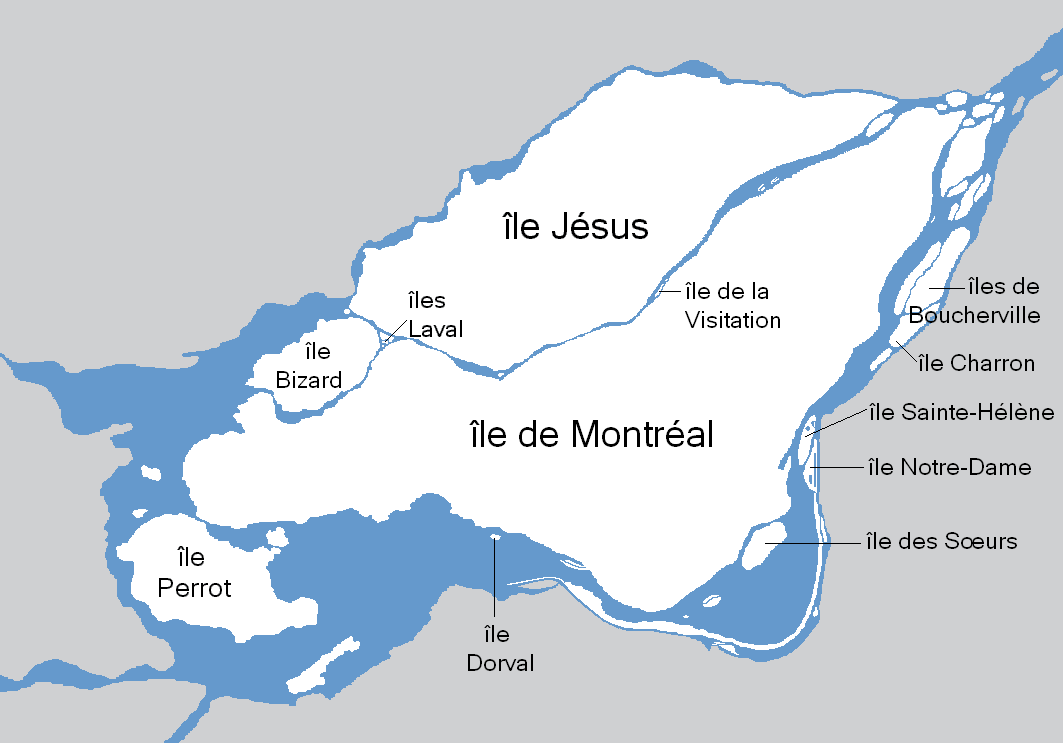
Map of the Hochelaga Archipelago, Île de la Visitation is between Île de Montréal and Île Jésus

Île de la Visitation is a small island in the Rivière des Prairies, part of the Hochelaga Archipelago, and part of the city of Montreal in Quebec, Canada.

Located within the boroughs of Ahuntsic-Cartierville and Montréal-Nord, the island is the site of the L'Île-de-la-Visitation Nature Park, as well as the remaining buildings of the historic Sault-au-Récollet district.

The island also includes the former hydraulic installations, l'île du Cheval-de-Terre, which is connected to Laval by the Rivière des Prairies generating station, as well as a wooded area left intact along the Rivière des Prairies.

== History ==
Known as Branchereau Island until 1750, Île de la Visitation borrows its name from the parish of the Visitation of the Blessed Virgin-Mary which was founded in 1736. In order to control the force of the current, the Sulpician landlords connected the island to the shore by a causeway. Between 1724 and 1726, Simon Sicar, engineer, built the dam and a sawmill near the island. He built a stone mill to grind corn, another for carding wool.

In 1785, the island was surveyed and subdivided.

== Mills ==
Over time, the mills have had several owners.

- 1726-1837: Séminaire de Montréal
- 1837-1867: Pascal Persillier-Lachapelle & Succession
- 1867-1872: Basile Piché
- 1872-1878: M. Ouimet
- 1878-1883: Wail McGauvran & Tucken
- 1883-1890: R. Gagnon père et fils
- 1890-1906: Dominion Leather Board Company
- 1906-1950: Back River Power Co
- 1950-1980: Milmont Fibreboards Co

There have been a few kinds of mills over the years.

- 1833-1879: Nail mill
- 1873-1890: Sawmill and paper mill
- 1890-1977: Paper mill

== Maison du Pressoir ==
The Maison du Pressoir was built in 1806 by Didier Joubert who used it to press apples into cider. It then became a house.

The remains of the stone foundation which served as base for the machine still exist.

== See also ==
- L'Île-de-la-Visitation Nature Park
- List of islands of Quebec
