= Belmont Park, Montreal =

Amusement park operated until 1983 in northern Montréal, Canada

Belmont Park
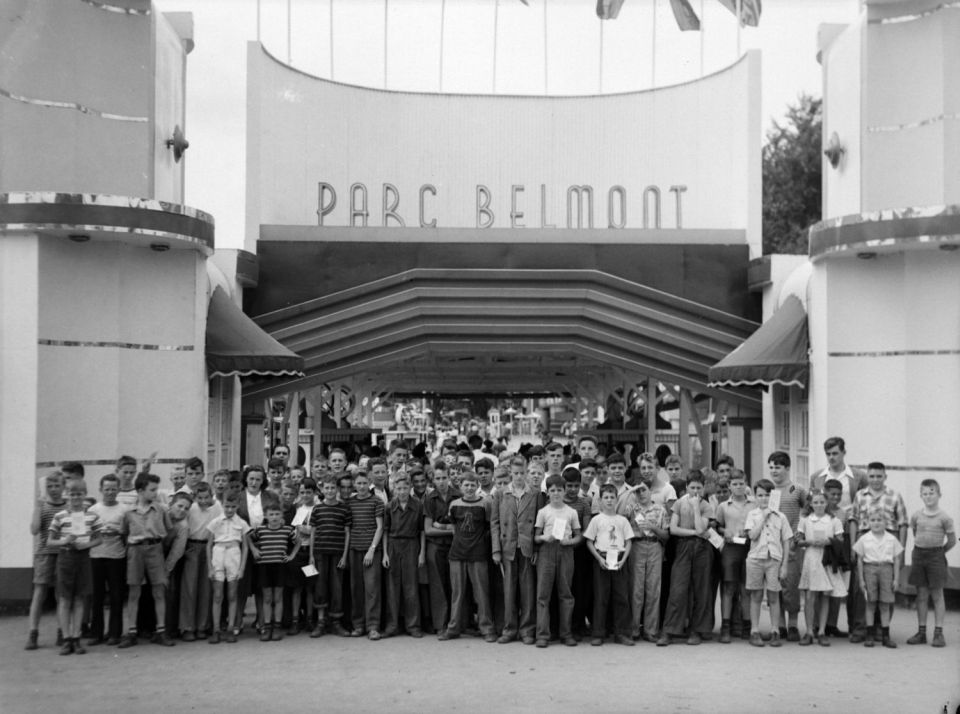
- Children in front of Belmont Park's entrance, 1948
- Interactive map of Belmont Park
- Location: Cartierville, Quebec, Canada
- Coordinates: 45.5322°N 73.7247°W
- Opened: June 9, 1923
- Closed: October 13, 1983

Belmont Park (French: Parc Belmont) was an amusement park that operated between 1923 and 1983 in the Montreal neighbourhood of Cartierville in Quebec, Canada.

Located on the banks of Riviere des Prairies, Belmont Park was best known for its wooden roller coaster, the Cyclone, but at one time or another had a Philadelphia Toboggan Company carousel, Ferris wheel, picnic grounds, dance hall, swimming pool, roller skating rink plus numerous other rides for adults and a "Kiddieland."

Belmont Park, which had opened on June 9, 1923, closed permanently on October 13, 1983. This followed a police raid that may have been motivated by city hall's displeasure at the park, a private venture, taking away business from the then city-owned La Ronde.

== Media ==
In 1972, Belmont Park was the subject of a short film, À mort (To Death), by Pierre Falardeau. It also served as the setting for the 1957 National Film Board of Canada film Pierrot in Montreal, in which mime Guy Hoffman demonstrates the stock character Pierrot.

== Belmont Park Police Service ==
The Belmont Park Company, exercising a privilege prescribed under the Quebec Police Act, formed, trained, and equipped its own duly sworn police officers. The park's police station, which included a few holding cells, was located at the rear, near the administration office. The station also served as a first-aid post.

Following the "midway cleanup" doctrine established at Idora Park by Mr. Rex D. Billings (known then as the "Master of the Midway"), which has since become an industry standard, Belmont Park followed suit by removing elements of dishonesty from the midway. For Billings, Belmont Park was first and foremost a family park. The Belmont Park Police Service became instrumental in this midway cleanup effort, as well as in all aspects of maintaining order at the park.

Composed of a chief, an assistant, two members of the Sûreté (plainclothes officers), and about ten constables, the Belmont Park Police Service became an effective deterrent with minimal response times. Due to their proximity to any events that might occur, the constables were the designated first responders while also acting as de facto ambassadors to visitors. The Belmont Park Police Service was dissolved upon the park's permanent closure in October 1983.

== Gallery ==
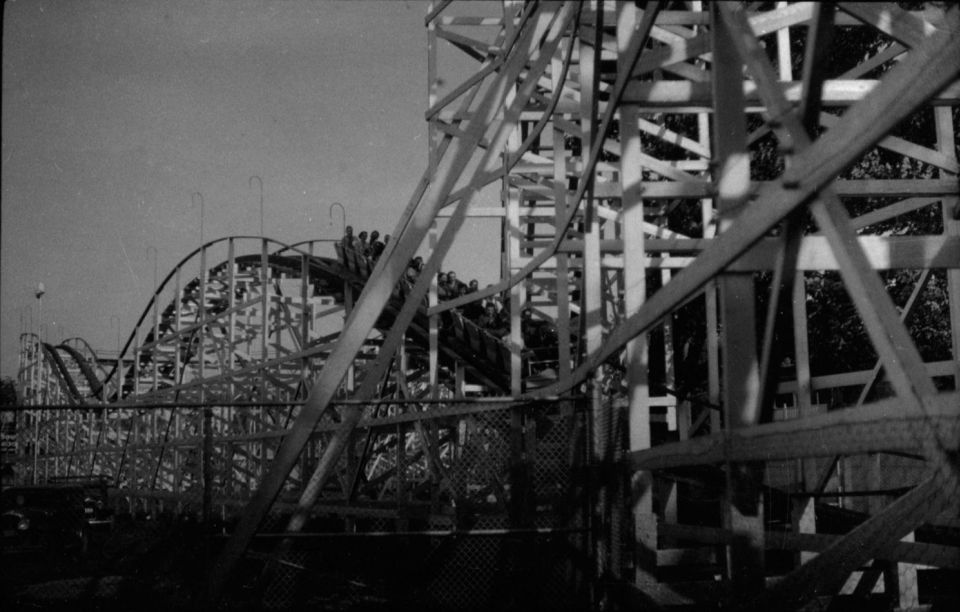
The Cyclone, 1937

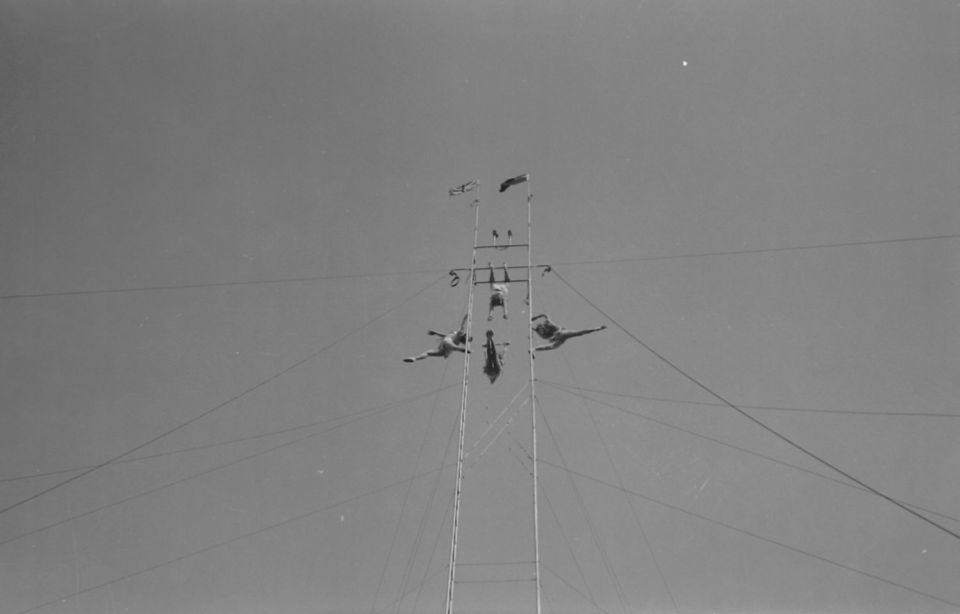
Trapeze acrobatics, 1937

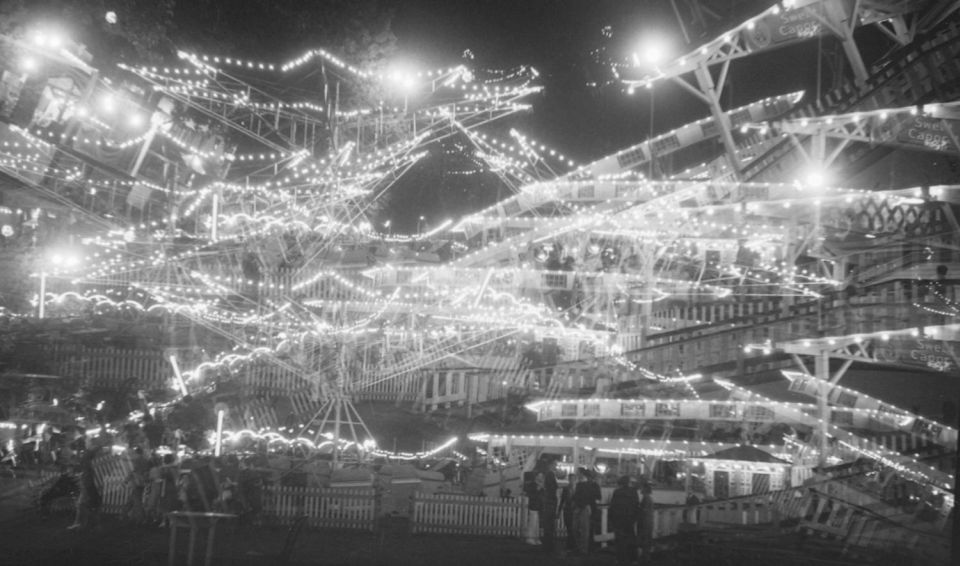
Night scene in Belmont Park, 1939

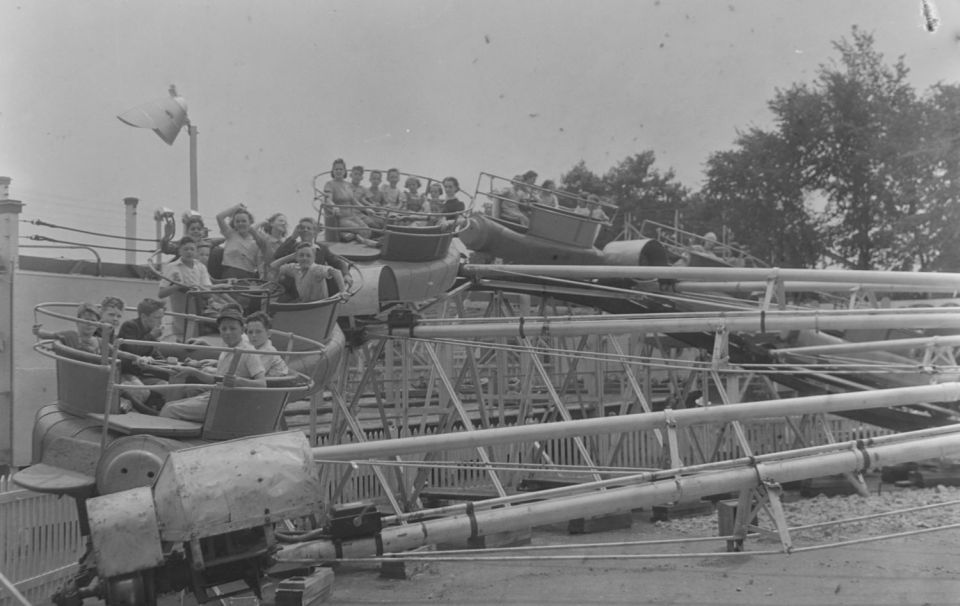
Children on amusement park ride at Belmont Park, 1941

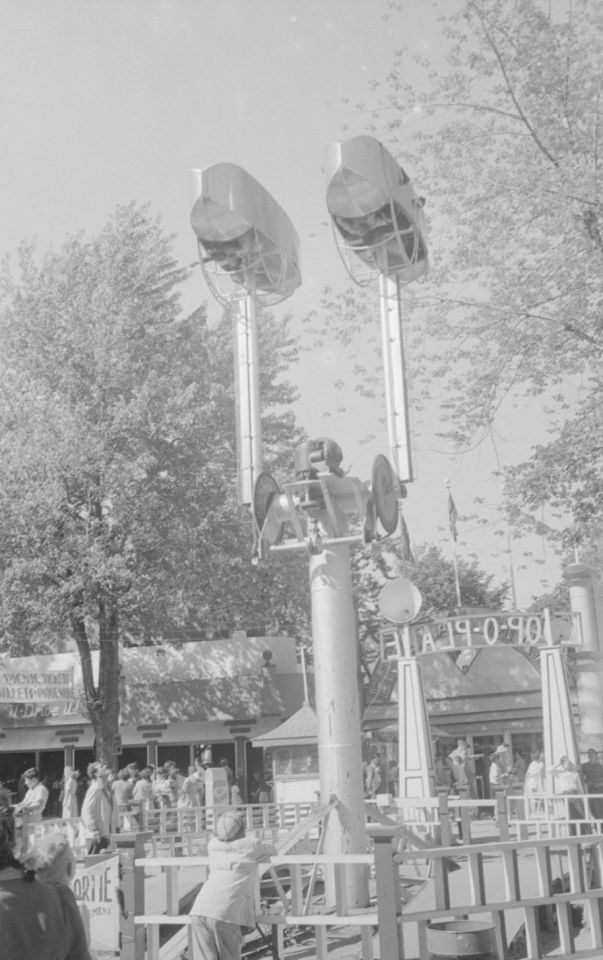
The Loop-O-Plane, 1943

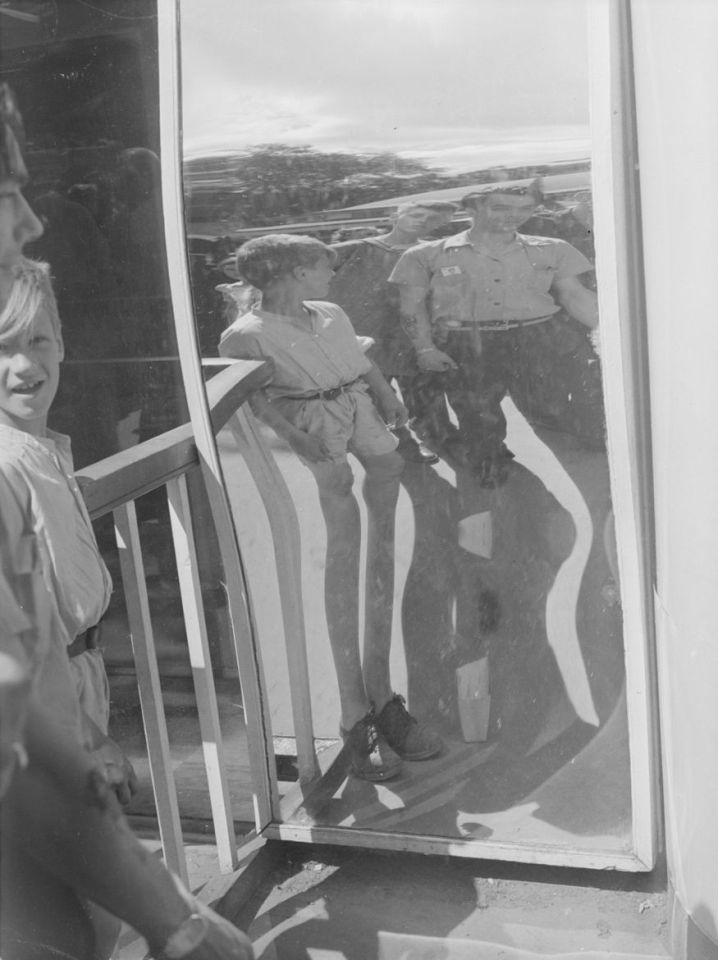
Distorting mirror, 1944

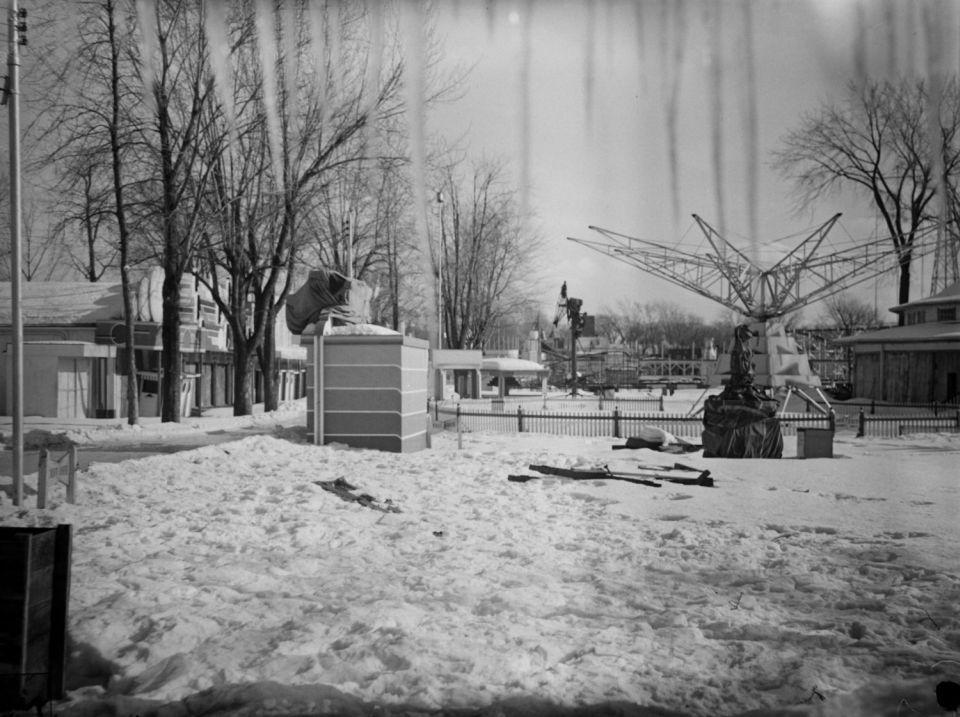
Closed during winter months, waiting to reopen in spring

== See also ==
- La Ronde (amusement park)
