= Ahuntsic-Cartierville =

Coordinates: 45.5350°N 73.7050°W

- Borough of Montreal
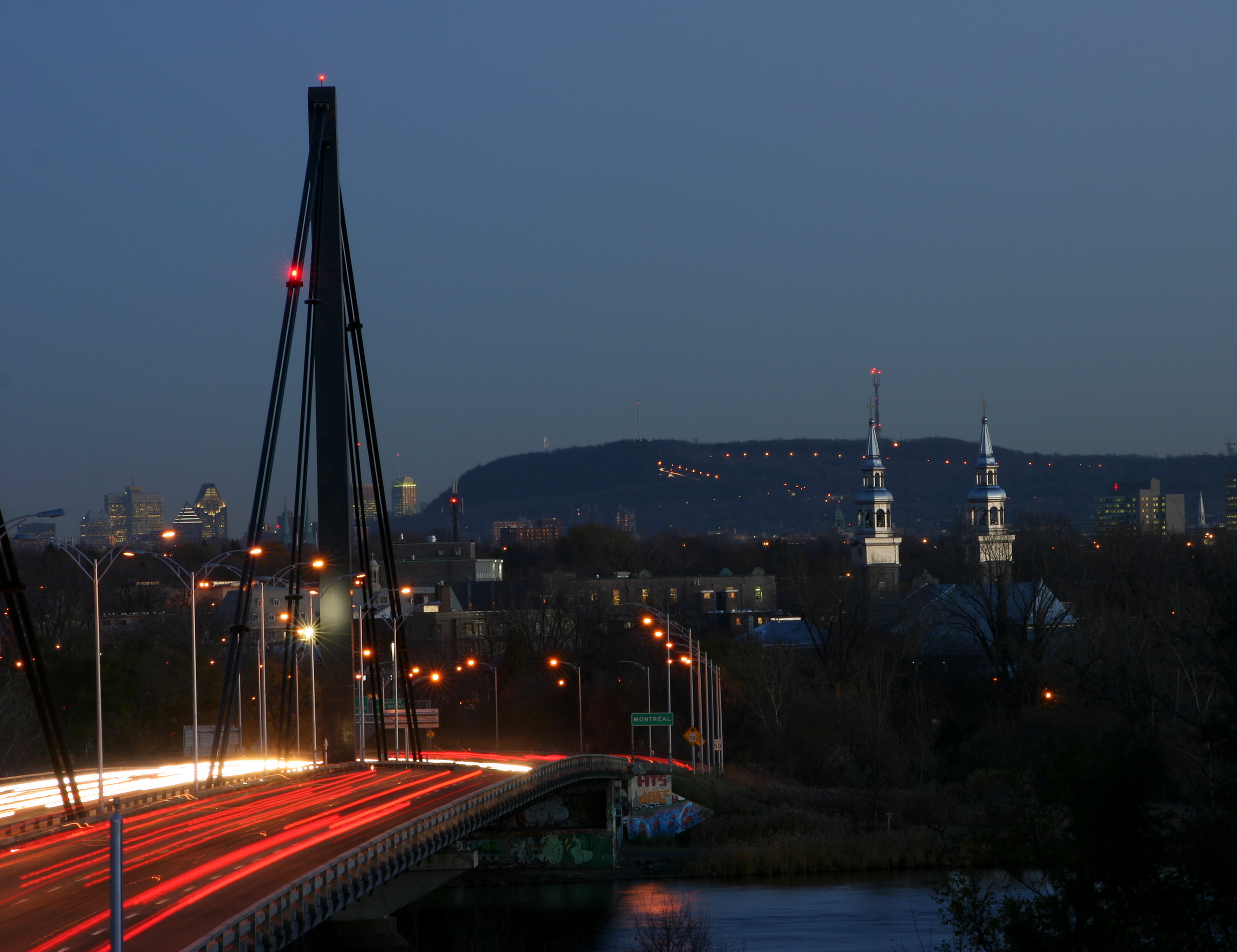
- Ahuntsic-Cartierville seen from Laval across the Papineau-Leblanc Bridge

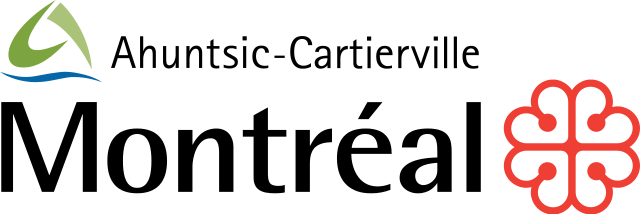

- Location of Ahuntsic-Cartierville on the Island of Montreal. (Dark grey areas indicate demerged municipalities).
- Country: Canada
- Province: Quebec
- Region: Montréal
- Established: January 1, 2002
- Electoral Districts Federal: Ahuntsic-Cartierville; Saint-Laurent
- Provincial: Saint-Laurent; Acadie; Maurice-Richard

Government
  - Type: Borough
  - Mayor: Maude Théroux-Séguin (Ensemble Montréal)
  - Federal MP(s): Mélanie Joly (LIB); Emmanuella Lambropoulos (LIB)
  - Quebec MNA(s): Marwah Rizqy (PLQ); André Morin (PLQ); Haroun Bouazzi (QS)

Area
  - Total: 24.2 km^{2} (9.3 sq mi)

Population (2021)
  - Total: 135,336
  - Density: 5,592.4/km^{2} (14,484/sq mi)
  - Dwellings: 59,015
- Time zone: UTC-5 (EST)
  - Summer (DST): UTC-4 (EDT)
- Postal code(s): H2B, H2C, H3L, H2M, H2N, H3M, H4J, H4K
- Area codes: (514) and (438)
- Highways A-15 A-19 A-40: R-117
- Website: ville.montreal.qc.ca/ahuntsic-cartierville

Ahuntsic-Cartierville (Canadian French pronunciation: [aɔntsɪk kaʁt͡sjevɪl]) is a borough (arrondissement) of the city of Montreal, Quebec, Canada. The borough was created following the 2002 municipal reorganization of Montreal. It comprises two main neighbourhoods: Ahuntsic, a former village annexed to Montreal in 1910 and Cartierville, a town annexed to Montreal in 1916.

Ahuntsic-Cartierville is located in the north end of Montreal, on the banks of the Rivière des Prairies. It traces its history to the fortified Sault-au-Récollet settlement, which was established by the Sulpicians in 1696. This in turn led to the colonization of the area.

== History ==
=== Sault-au-Récollet ===
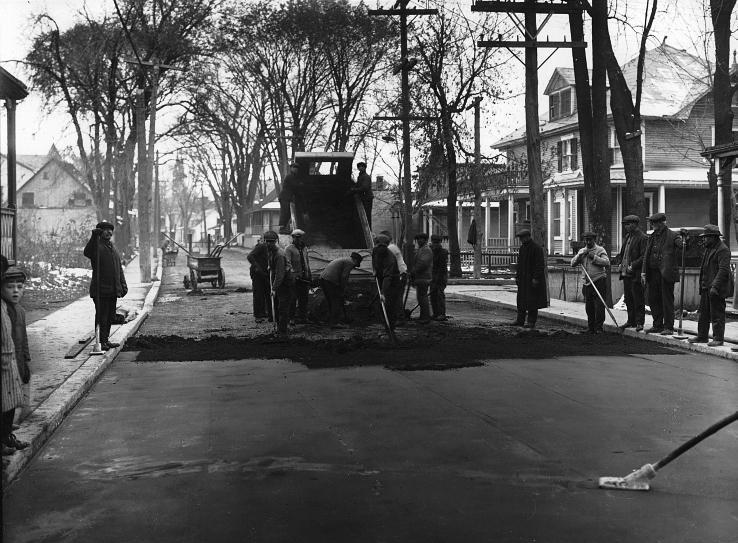
Workers spreading asphalt in Sault-au-Récollet about 1930.

One of the oldest villages on the island of Montreal, Sault-au-Récollet still retains its village atmosphere with many houses dating from the 18th and 19th centuries. It was the original site of Fort Lorette, a trading post and mission for the conversion of the First Nations people of the area.

It grew prosperous in the 18th century with the construction of a mill on the rapids on the Rivière des Prairies (from which the village derives its name: Sault-au-Récollet, or Recollet Falls). A dam was built on the narrow arm of the river that passes between the village and Visitation Island, which splits the river in two at that point. A museum and cultural centre, the Maison du Pressoir, perpetuates this memory. A hydroelectric dam was built later and still exists further down the river.

The village and Île de la Visitation (Visitation Island) are surrounded by the green space of the Parc-Nature de l'Île de la Visitation. The village is noted for Visitation Church, one of the oldest churches in Montreal, which is a listed historical monument.

=== Cartierville ===
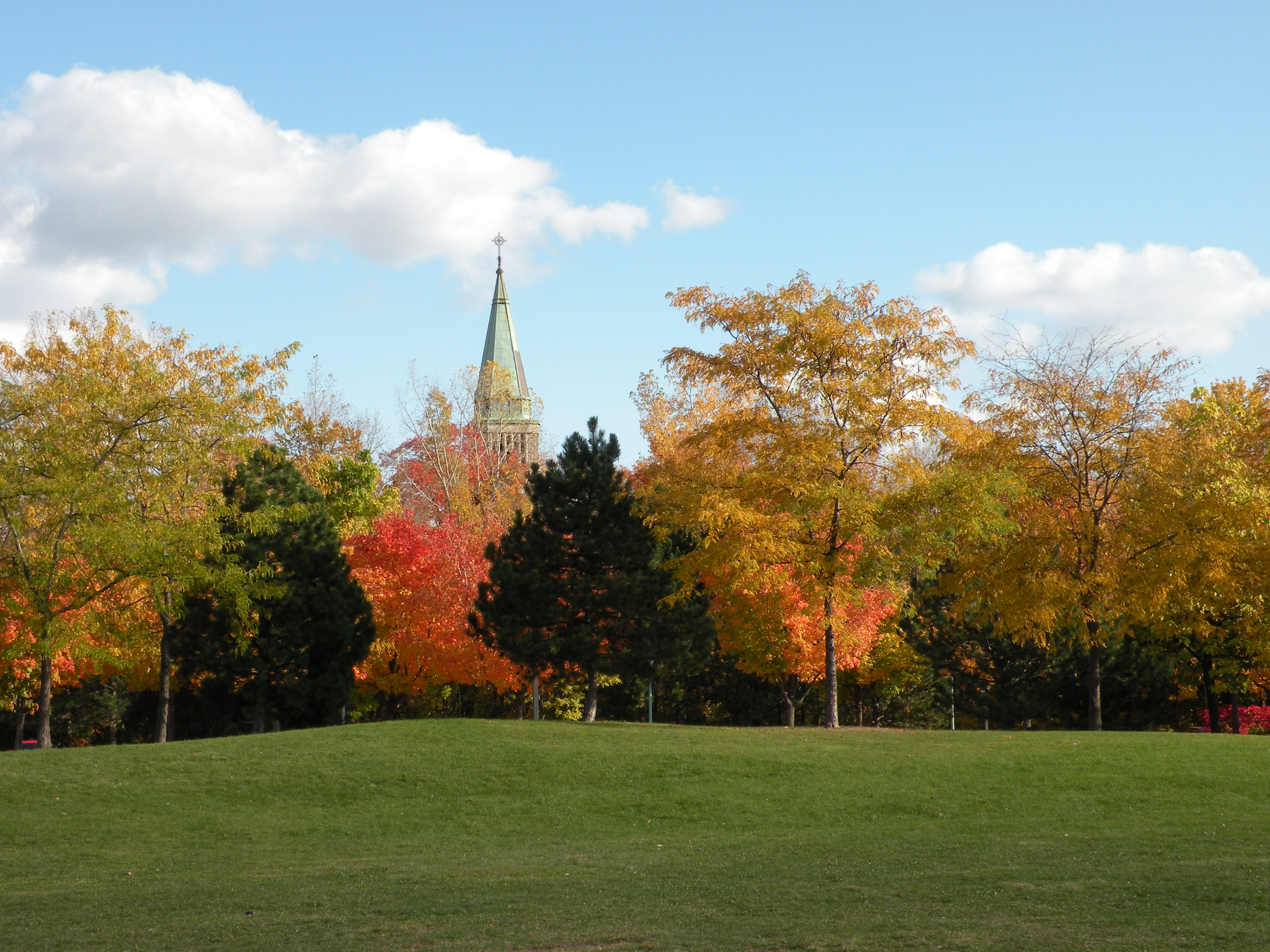
Sainte-Madeleine-Sophie-Barat Church / Saint-Maron Cathedral.

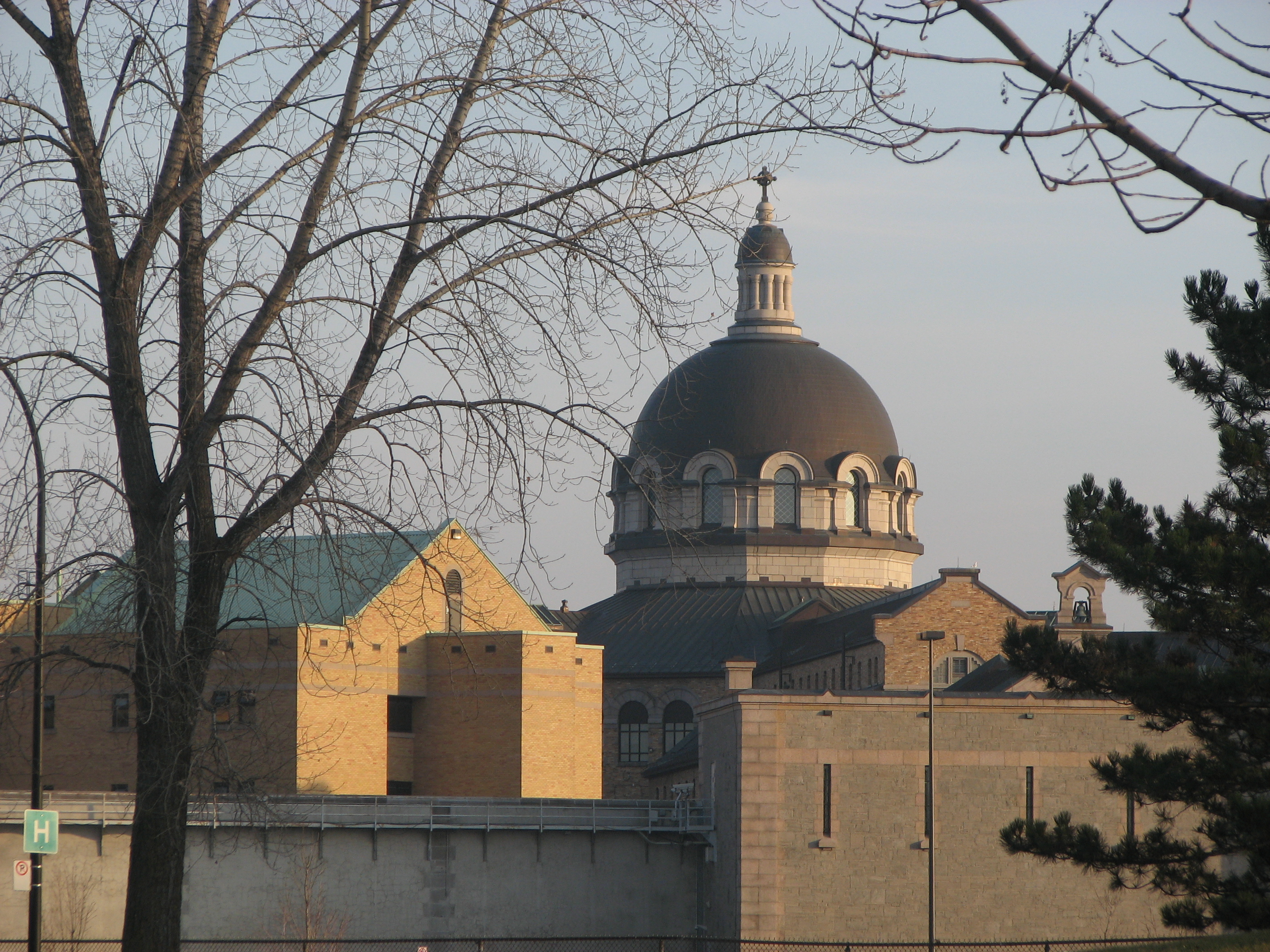
Bordeaux Prison.

Cartierville grew as a suburb when it became in 1898 the north terminus of the Montreal Park and Island Railway tramway line, also known as the "17-Cartierville". Named in the honor of Sir George-Étienne Cartier, it became a village officially in 1906. During December 1912, it achieved city status. Two years later, the rural and agricultural part of Cartierville was granted independence from the city and was then known as Ville de Saraguay.

On 22 December 1916, the provincial government ordered the annexation of Cartierville to Montreal. The district was famous for the Belmont Park amusement park which operated from 1929 to the 1980s.

=== Nouveau-Bordeaux ===
New Bordeaux (or simply Bordeaux) was originally part of the independent village of Cartierville until it became its own municipality in 1898. The district was originally named Saint-Joseph de Bordeaux until 1906. One year later, Bordeaux attained city status. On June 4, 1910, it was annexed by the larger City of Montreal. The district was home to Maurice Richard, writer Claude Jasmin and Comte Daeylar.

=== Ahuntsic ===
The municipality of the Village of Ahuntsic was founded on January 21, 1897, by a proclamation of the Quebec provincial government. The council of the new village operated until 1910, when the province passed laws creating the charter of the City of Montreal. It was then annexed and later combined with Nouveau-Bordeaux, forming the district of Ahuntsic-Bordeaux. The city of Cartierville and Sault-au-Récollet were added in 1918.

In 1952, following a land exchange, Ahuntsic took over part of Saint-Laurent. The Ahuntsic-Cartierville borough was part of the City of Montreal prior to January 1, 2002. For further reading on pre-merger Montreal, see Karen Herland's book "People, Potholes and Politics".

=== Saraguay ===
In 1914, the rural and agricultural part of the city of Cartierville became independent, forming its own city. It was only in 1964, that Saraguay joined itself to the City of Montreal under law 2926 approved by the lieutenant-governor of the province of Quebec.

== Geography ==
The borough is located in the northern part of Montreal along the banks of the Rivière des Prairies, and includes some islands in the river such as Île aux Chats, Île Perry, and Île de la Visitation. It is bounded to the east by Montréal-Nord, to the southeast by the borough of Villeray–Saint-Michel–Parc-Extension, to the southwest by the borough of Saint-Laurent, and to the west by the borough of Pierrefonds-Roxboro. It has an area of 22.92 km^{2} and a population of 127,000.

== Politics ==
=== Municipal ===
The borough's office is located at 555, rue Chabanel West, Montreal. The territory is divided into four districts.

==== Borough council ====
District	Position	Name	Party
—	Borough mayor	Émilie Thuillier	Projet Montréal
Ahuntsic	City councillor	Nathalie Goulet	Projet Montréal
Bordeaux-Cartierville	City councillor	Effie Giannou	Ensemble Montréal
Saint-Sulpice	City councillor	Julie Roy	Projet Montréal
Sault-au-Récollet	City councillor	Jérôme Normand	Projet Montréal

=== Federal and provincial ===
Federally, the borough is in the riding of Ahuntsic-Cartierville. Provincially, the borough is divided between the Saint-Laurent, Acadie, and Maurice-Richard electoral districts.

== Demographics ==
Source : ^{,}

Historical populations
Year	Pop.	±%
1966	132,001	—
1971	133,793	+1.4%
1976	125,197	−6.4%
1981	117,860	−5.9%
1986	122,009	+3.5%
1991	124,745	+2.2%
1996	123,461	−1.0%
2001	125,145	+1.4%
2006	126,607	+1.2%
2011	126,891	+0.2%
2016	134,245	+5.8%
2021	135,336	+0.8%

Home language (2016)
Language	Population	Percentage (%)
French	76,190	65%
English	11,755	10%
Other languages	28,675	25%

Mother Tongue (2016)
Language	Population	Percentage (%)
French	66,625	54%
English	6,490	5%
Other languages	51,090	41%

Visible Minorities (2016)
Ethnicity	Population	Percentage (%)
Not a visible minority	80,410	62.5%
Visible minorities	48,305	37.5%

== Education ==
The Collège de Bois-de-Boulogne and the Collège Ahuntsic are located in Ahuntsic-Cartierville.

The Commission scolaire de Montréal (CSDM) operates French-language public schools.

=== Elementary ===
- École Saint-Bernardin
- École Marie-Rivier
- École Sainte-Lucie
- École Saint-Antoine-Marie-Claret
- École Atelier
- École La Visitation
- École Saints-Martyrs-Canadiens
- École Saint-Simon-Apôtre
- École Saint-Isaac-Jogues
- École Fernand-Seguin
- École Christ-Roi
- École Saint-Paul-de-la-Croix
- École Louis-Colin
- École Ahuntsic
- École Saint-André-Apôtre
- École Saint-Benoît
- École Gilles-Vigneault
- École Sainte-Odile
- École François-de-Laval
- École Alice-Parizeau
- École Louisbourg

=== High school ===
- École Dominique-Savio
- École Sophie-Barat
- École Evangéline
- École La Dauversière
- École Marie-Anne

The English Montreal School Board (EMSB) operates English-language schools.

=== Elementary ===
- John Caboto Academy

=== High school ===
- L.I.N.K.S. High School

=== Specialized ===
- St. Pius X Career Centre

== Infrastructure ==
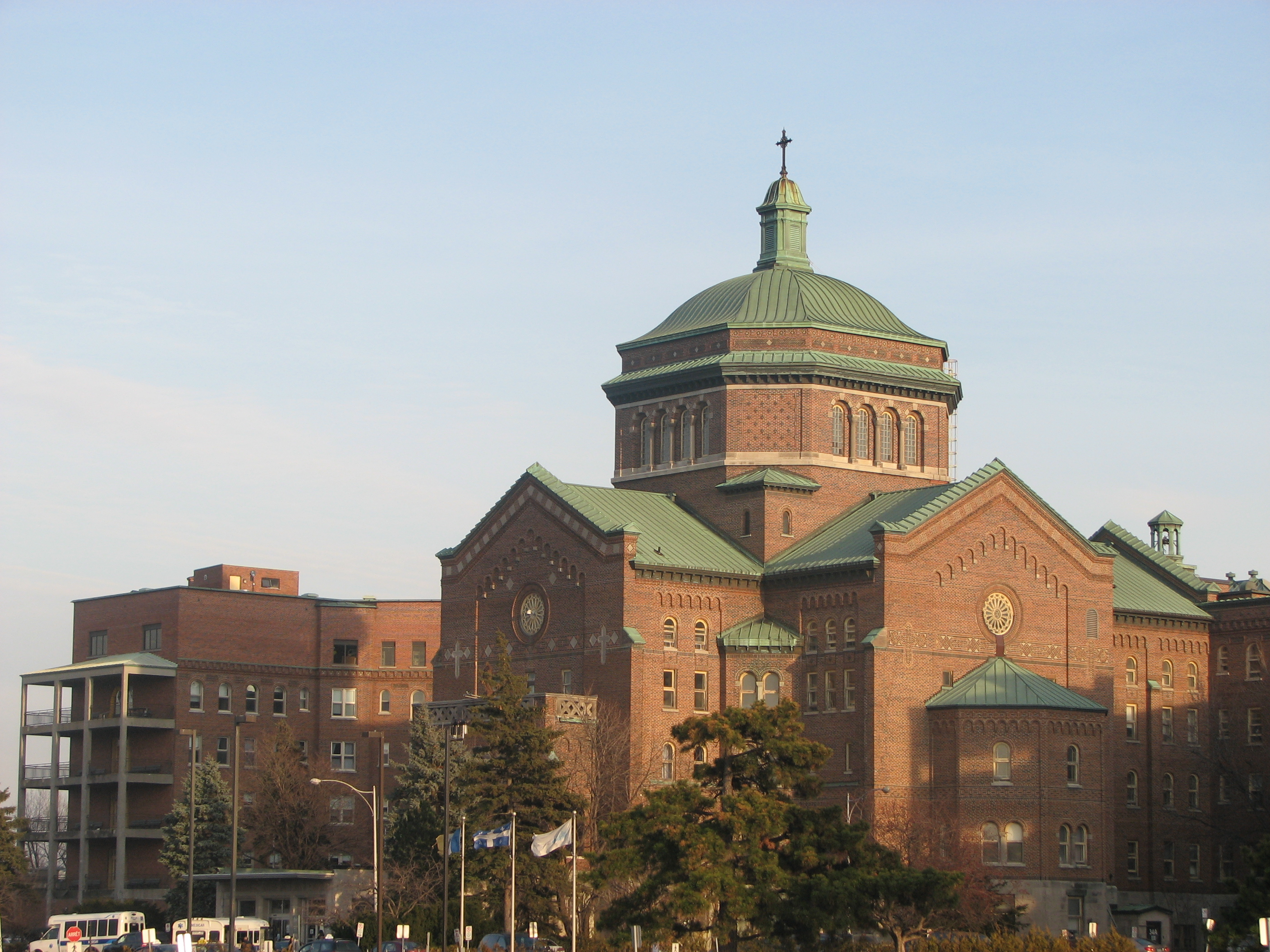
Sacré-Coeur Hospital.

=== Transport ===
Ahuntsic-Cartierville is served by three stations on the north-eastern part of the Montreal Metro's Orange line which runs underneath Berri Street. Henri-Bourassa located on Henri Bourassa Boulevard, Sauvé Sauvé station located on Sauvé Street, and Crémazie station located on Crémazie Boulevard.

The borough is also served by four commuter rail stations of the Réseau de transport métropolitain. Bois-de-Boulogne station and Chabanel station on the Saint-Jérôme line is located on Henri Bourassa Blvd, while Ahuntsic and Sauvé on the Mascouche line are near the Sauvé St.

The Bois-Franc station on the Réseau express métropolitain is located on Henri Bourassa Blvd. in nearby Saint-Laurent.

Two major Autoroutes are located in the Ahuntsic-Cartierville. Autoroute15 (Laurentian Autoroute/Autoroute des Laurentides) runs north-south and Autoroute 40 (Metropolitan Autoroute/Autoroute Métropolitaine) runs east-west.

Main streets or boulevards include Henri-Bourassa, Fleury, Sauvé, L'Acadie, Chabanel, Gouin, Saint-Laurent, Saint-Denis, Salaberry.

=== Healthcare ===
Sacré-Coeur Hospital and Fleury Hospital service the area. The CLSC also responds to citizen's health care needs.

== Sports and recreation ==
Ahuntsic-Cartierville features large parks along its riverside, such as Île Perry and Parc de l'Île de la Visitation, which offer views of the river and of nearby Laval, Quebec. Ahuntsic Park and Marcelin-Wilson Park are the borough's main parks, which both have playgrounds, skate parks, and arenas housing ice skating rinks. Ahuntsic Park has a dog park, a community garden, water playground and large open-space field for outdoor seasonal events while Marcelin-Wilson Park has a swimming pool, tennis courts and soccer fields. The borough is also traversed by the Route Verte, a province-wide network of bicycle paths. The Complexe sportif Claude-Robillard, located at 1000 Émile-Journault Avenue, is one of the main sport complexes in the city. The Cartierville area to the west was formerly the home of the Belmont Park amusement park.

The Orioles de Montréal baseball team of the Ligue de Baseball Élite du Québec play their home games at Gary Carter Stadium (formerly Marcel-Clement Field) located in Ahuntsic Park.

The borough has three libraries of the Montreal Public Libraries Network: Ahuntsic (adults and children), Cartierville (adults and children) and De Salaberry (children's only).

== See also ==
- Boroughs of Montreal
- Centrale de la Rivière des Prairies
- Districts of Montreal
- Municipal reorganization in Quebec
