= Transition Montréal =

Local political party in Montreal, Canada

Transition Montréal is a municipal political party in the city of Montreal, founded in July 2025. Led by the city councillor Craig Sauvé, it presents itself as a response to the dissatisfaction facing the principal political parties Projet Montréal and Ensemble Montréal, which Sauvé decries as forming a "two-party system". The party proposes policies focused on social equity, housing, municipal transparency, the environment, and neighborhood life. Transition Montréal was officially launched on 16 July 2025 and, the next day, announced Craig Sauvé's candidacy for mayor of Montréal in the municipal elections scheduled for 2 November 2025.

== History ==
=== Founding of the party ===
Transition Montréal was founded in 2025 by Olivier Labrèche, Luc Corbin, Frédéric Bataille, and Manouane Beauchamp. The party was born from the intention to propose a new voice in Montreal politics, then dominated by two parties in continual opposition. Transition Montréal envisions expanding citizen choice and bringing constructive and collaborative solutions to address the city's challenges, such as the housing crisis, homelessness, the climate crisis, public safety, and fiscal equity.

Julie Bélanger, former campaign manager for Projet Montréal, joined Transition Montréal shortly after its creation. Several days after her departure, another Projet Montréal employee, Duncan Viktor Salvain, New Democratic Party (NDP) field campaign manager and collaborator with Craig Sauvé during the last federal election, also joined Transition Montréal to strengthen the party's policy team.

=== 2025 municipal elections ===
The party launched its first electoral campaign for the mayoralty on 21 September 2025 at a rally in downtown Montreal. Promising to present candidates in the city's 19 boroughs, Transition Montréal began unveiling its policy proposal in the weeks leading up to the election.

==== Programme ====
The party proposes the following changes:

- Housing: impose a moratorium on Airbnb-type tourist rentals, recognizing that too many Montrealers are evicted from their homes by landlords attracted by the profitability of short-term rentals.
- Public safety: put an end to street arrests (or routine arrests by the police). The creation of a new civil unit to respond to the majority of calls that are not linked to criminality, with an expanded mandate as compared to the current mobile social mediation and intervention team (ÉMMIS).

== Party leader ==
- Craig Sauvé, city councillor from the district of Saint-Henri–Petite-Bourgogne–Pointe-Saint-Charles–Griffintown (2013-).

== Electoral results ==
Election	Mayoral candidate	Result	Council seats
2025	Craig Sauvé	To be determined	To be determined

== See also ==
- Action Montréal
- Projet Montréal
- Futur Montréal
- 2025 Montreal municipal election
