= Rivière des Prairies generating station =

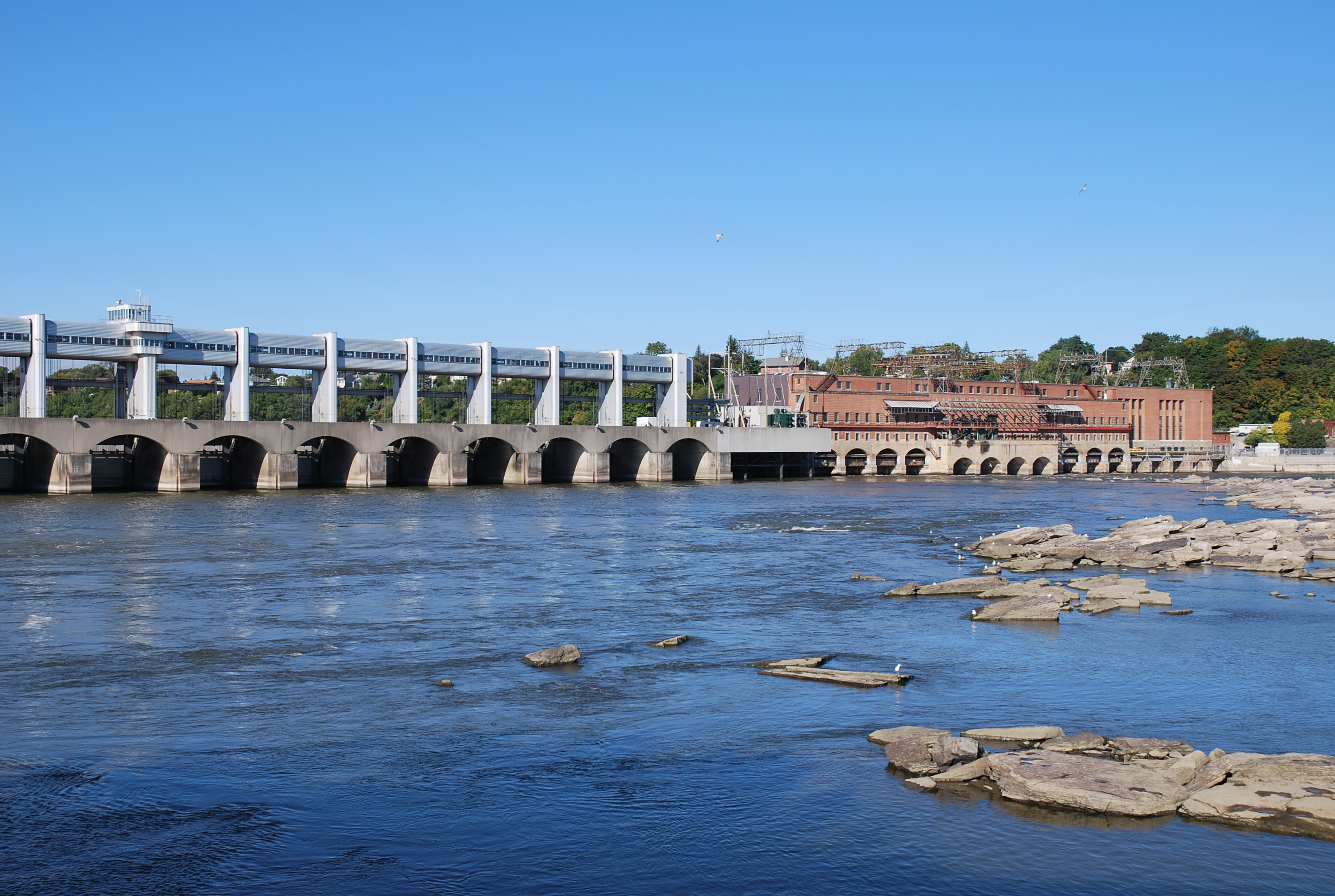
- The Rivière des Prairies generating station
- Interactive map of Rivière des Prairies generating station
- Official name: Centrale de la Rivière des Prairies
- Location: Laval / Montreal, Quebec
- Coordinates: 45°35′17″N 73°39′21″W
- Construction began: 1928
- Opening date: 1930
- Operator: Hydro-Québec

Dam and spillways
- Impounds: Rivière des Prairies

Power Station
- Hydraulic head: (hydraulic head); 7.32–7.93 m or 24–26 ft

The Rivière des Prairies generating station (in French: Centrale de la Rivière des Prairies) is a run of river hydroelectric power station on the Rivière des Prairies between the islands of Jesus and Montreal, Quebec, Canada. Built in 1929, it is now managed and operated by Hydro-Québec. It has a generating capacity of 48 MW. There is no lock allowing boats to bypass the dam.

Statistics:

- Year built: 1929
- Installed capacity: 48 MW
- Number of generators: 6
- Hydraulic head: 7.32–7.93 m or 24–26 ft
- Hydraulic flow: ~ 1,000 m^{3}/s (1,308 cu yd/s)
- Reservoir: n/a (run-of-river)

== See also ==
- Île de la Visitation
- List of bridges in Montreal
- List of crossings of the Rivière des Prairies
- List of hydroelectric stations
- List of reservoirs and dams in Quebec

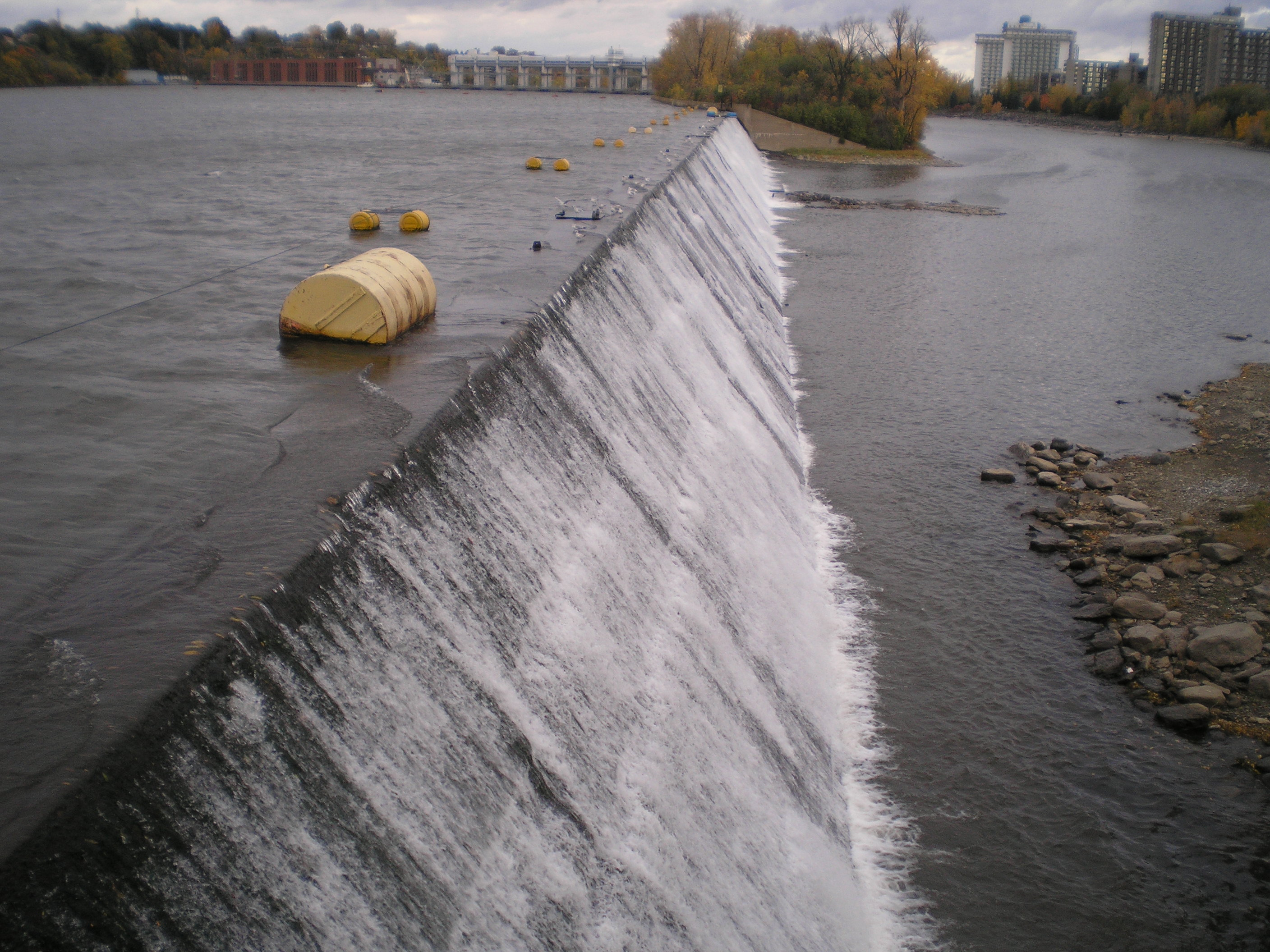
Spillway of the Rivière des Prairies generating station..
