= West Island =

Settlements in Quebec, Canada

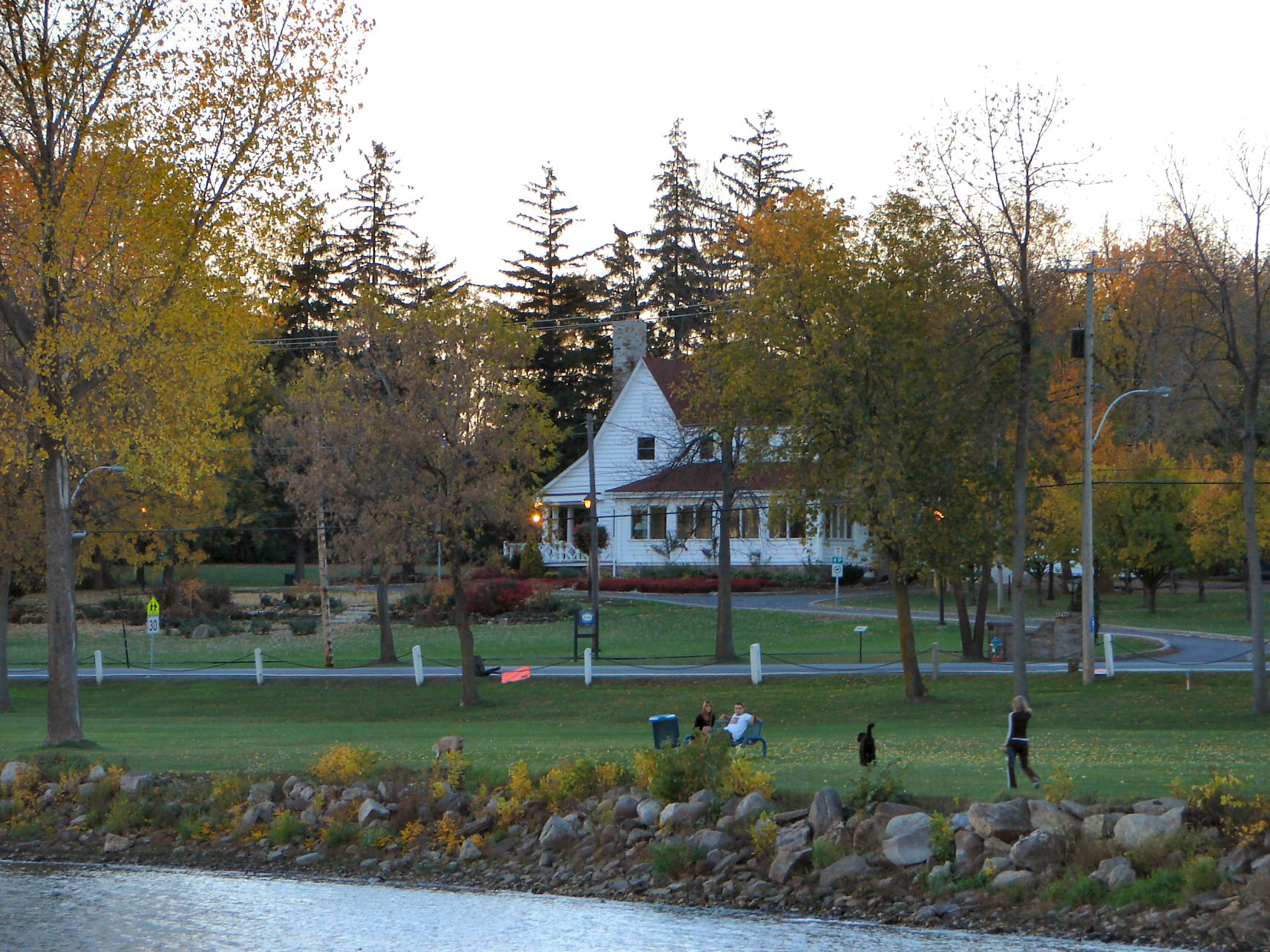
- Baie-D'Urfé, on the shores of Lake Saint-Louis
- Interactive map of West Island
- Coordinates: 45°28′00″N 73°49′00″W
- Country: Canada
- Province: Quebec
- Urban agglomeration: Montreal

Area
  - Total: 150.11 km^{2} (57.96 sq mi)

Population (2021)
  - Total: 238,000
  - Density: 1,496.7/km^{2} (3,876/sq mi)
- Time zone: UTC−5 (Eastern (EST))
  - Summer (DST): UTC−4 (EDT)
- Postal code span: H8Y to H9X
- Area codes: (514) and (438)

The West Island (French: Ouest-de-l'Île, pronounced [wɛst də lil]) is the unofficial name given to the city, towns and boroughs at the western end of the Island of Montreal, in Quebec, Canada. It is generally considered to consist of the Lakeshore municipalities of Lachine (specifically the Western Lachine area, also known as Dixie and later Summerlea), Dorval, Pointe-Claire, and Beaconsfield, the municipalities of Kirkland, Dollard-des-Ormeaux, Baie-D'Urfé, Sainte-Anne-de-Bellevue, the village of Senneville, and two North Shore boroughs of the city of Montreal: Pierrefonds-Roxboro and L'Île-Bizard–Sainte-Geneviève.

Historically, there was a linguistic division of the island of Montreal into French and English 'halves', with Francophones typically inhabiting the eastern portion of the island and Anglophones typically inhabiting the western half. The West Island's population is approximately 238,000 and although the overwhelming majority of its residents are today bilingual if not multi-lingual (given the cosmopolitan nature of this vast suburban area), anglophones still make up a plurality of the West Island's population. As late as the 1960s, much of the West Island was farmland populated by French Canadians, which in turn accounts for a significant Francophone cultural influence in the region.

The region is home to the Montréal–Trudeau International Airport, John Abbott College, Cégep Gérald-Godin, the Macdonald Campus of McGill University, the Fairview Pointe-Claire and Galeries des Sources malls, as well as Montreal's largest park, the Cap-Saint-Jacques Nature Park. Hospitals include the Veteran's Hospital in Sainte-Anne's and the Lakeshore General Hospital in Pointe-Claire. Municipalities range in character from the modern bedroom communities of Kirkland or Dollard-des-Ormeaux to the former cottage-country homes of Dorval, Pointe Claire and Beaconsfield. Development and the concentration of industrial activity along highways 20, 40 and 13 since the late 1980s has made securing the region's remaining tracts of open land a priority for many West Island residents. The West Island is home to one of the last large remaining tracts of Montreal-region wilderness on island.

== History ==
=== Pre-contact, colonial and agricultural eras ===
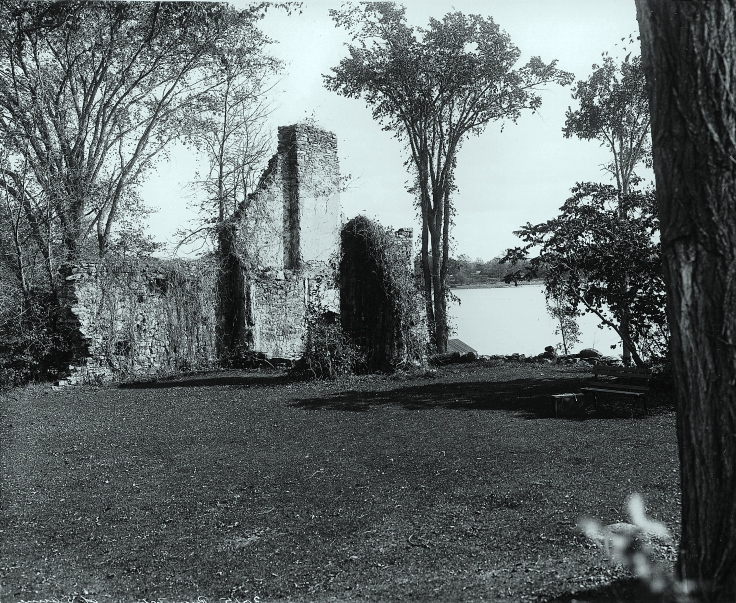
Fort Senneville as it appeared in 1895 when photographed by William Notman & Sons

The history of human settlement in the West Island of Montréal likely predated European colonization which began in the early to mid 17th century, but little is known of the history of the St. Lawrence Iroquoians who inhabited the island in the pre-colonial era. Indeed, between Cartier's first contact in 1535–1536 and the arrival of Champlain in 1608, the local Iroquoians had completely disappeared, most probably from near-constant warfare with other neighbouring Iroquois tribes, particularly the Mohawk. The West Island may have had areas of regular human habitation as the history of human settlement in Montreal goes back at least as far as 8,000 years.

European colonization led to the establishment of parishes and small trading outposts along a Chemin du Roy laid out in the 17th century that corresponds more or less directly with the Gouin & Lakeshore boulevards of today. Lachine, Sainte-Anne-de-Bellevue, Sainte-Genevieve and Pointe-Claire developed in a more or less interconnected fashion as colonial outposts spread out along the edge of the island. During the Ancien Régime of the early colonial era, these communities had their own parish churches, many of which still exist. In addition to the churches and rectories, religious orders of various types had set up monasteries and convents, novitiates and the like throughout the West Island, given its proximity to Ville-Marie. Seigneurial system land divisions and the development of the 'montée & rang' main road system allowed for the development of a vast agricultural territory, protected by forts, seigneurial manor houses and the geographic advantages of being on a densely forested island. Though much of the West Island is today a vast low-density modern suburban development, most of the principal roads were developed in the 17th and 18th centuries, inasmuch as land division follows examples common to the Ancien Régime. Moreover, the West Island has a small number of critical 18th century heritage properties, in addition to parish churches, summer villas, windmills and the remnants of Fort Senneville, constituting the principle remnants from the early and middle colonial period in this area. Other important heritage properties include the numerous 19th century summer homes, farm houses and the turn of the century villages in Pointe-Claire, Saint-Anne's or Sainte-Genevieve. A key element of local architecture, as noted by author-historian Jean-Claude Marsan, is that the Habitant house-style of the 17th century proved so reliable, affordable and aesthetically pleasing it was repeated well into the 20th century with few major structural modifications. Houses of this kind can be found throughout the region.

Two seigneuries were founded on land that is now part of the West Island:

- 1678, Seigneurie de l'Île-Bizard (b)
- 1636, Seigneurie de l'Île-de-Montréal (c)

This led to the creation of the first three parishes:

- 1703, Sainte-Anne-du-Bout-de-l'Île
- 1713, Saint-Joachim-de-la-Pointe-Claire
- 1741, Sainte-Geneviève-de-Pierrefonds

In 1672, the seigneurie de l'Île-Perrot was founded, which is now part of the Off-Island region.

Key early settlements leading up to the major post-war suburban developments include:

Dorval, founded between 1665 and 1667 as a Sulpician mission, became a village in 1892, a town in 1903 and a city in 1956. Its development came largely in 1855 when the Grand Trunk Railroad established a station at Dorval, leading the hamlet to develop into a summer retreat for wealthy early-Victorian Era Montreal elites. Later, through the start of the century until the Second World War, the village became a town well known for its beaches on Lake Saint-Louis.

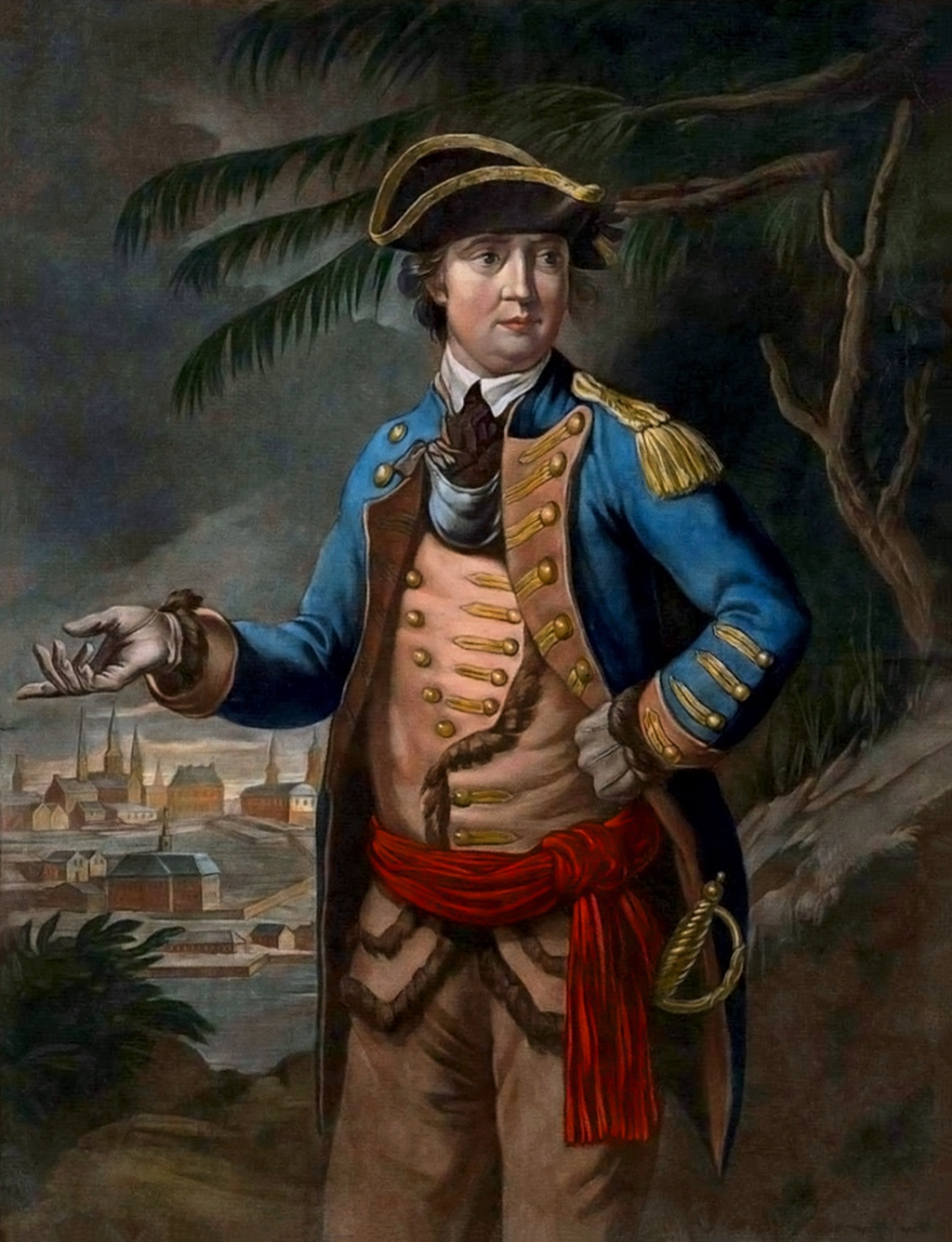
Colonel Benedict Arnold in 1776, the year he destroyed the Senneville fort

Sainte-Anne-de-Bellevue, first explored and settled between 1663 and 1712, though widely used by Iroquois and Algonquins for hundreds if not thousands of years before contact, due to its strategic importance at the confluence of the Ottawa and Saint Lawrence rivers and at the western tip of the Island of Montreal. A mission was established at the present site of the Baie-D'Urfé Yacht Club in 1663, while Fort Senneville was developed beginning in 1671. A post office was established in 1835 while the Saint Anne Canal was established in 1843. Train service on the Grand Trunk began in 1854, and the village was first incorporated a year later. Though the village had been principally oriented on parish activities and agriculture throughout the 19th century, the early 20th century saw the development of Macdonald College in 1907, the creation of Gardenvale and the Harpell/Garden City Print Company, an important industrial cooperative, in addition to the Veterans Hospital in 1917.

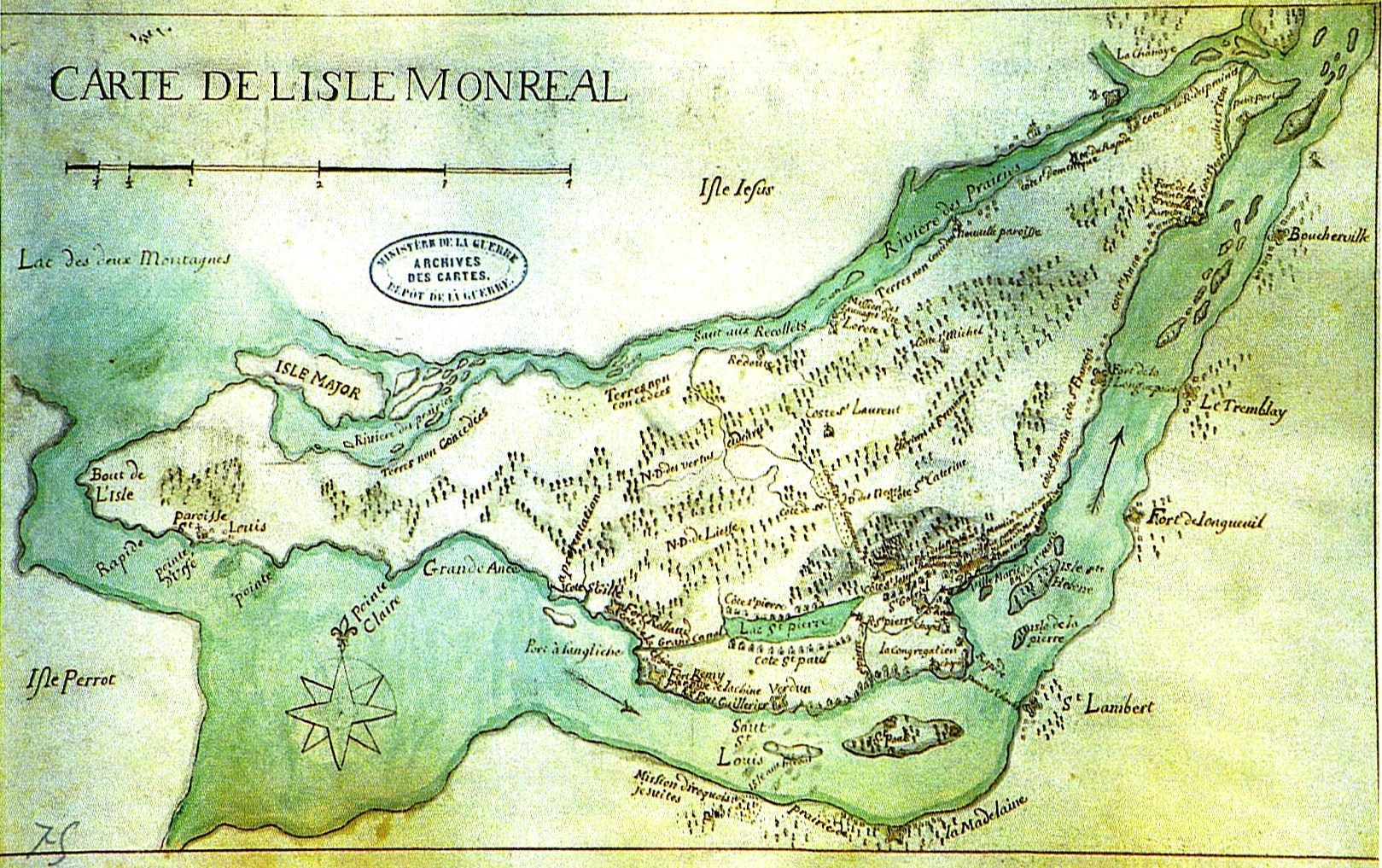
A map of the Island of Montreal made in the 1700s. The words "Pointe Claire" are visible.

=== Early 21st century: merger and demerger ===
As part of the 2002–2006 municipal reorganization of Montreal, all individual cities on the Island of Montreal, including those in the West Island, were merged into the expanded city of Montreal on January 1, 2002. However, following a change of government and a 2004 referendum, the residents of most West Island cities voted for demerger, and were re-constituted effective January 1, 2006. However, they remained part of a new supra-municipal structure: the urban agglomeration of Montreal. Pierrefonds, Roxboro, Sainte-Geneviève and Île-Bizard remained in Montreal, as the boroughs of Pierrefonds-Roxboro and L'Île-Bizard–Sainte-Geneviève, respectively.

One argument for amalgamation was that West Islanders enjoyed lower taxes than the old city of Montreal, but still used its theatres, concert halls, and museums. With amalgamation, tax rates were harmonized across the island. In fact, the West Island contains several wealthy neighbourhoods, parks and historical sites.

When referring to towns that touch Lake Saint-Louis, such as Dorval, Pointe-Claire and Beaconsfield, the area is at times referred to as "the Lakeshore", whereas in reference to towns that touch Lake of Two Mountains and Rivière-des-Prairies, such as Pierrefonds, Sainte-Geneviève and Roxboro, this area may be referred to as "the North Shore".

== Housing and infrastructure ==
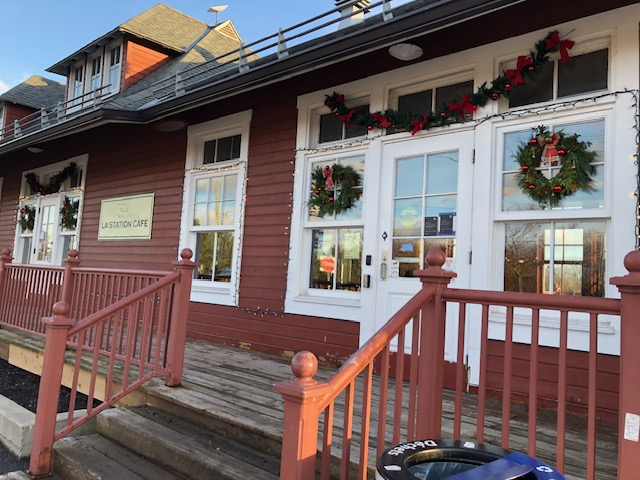
Historic railway station in Beaconsfield

The West Island has a cosmopolitan feel and at times an eclectic design (with modern buildings and classic Québécois country homes side by side). The region boasts large green spaces bordering rivers and lakes, bike trails, nature parks, museums, cross-country ski trails, ecological farms, golf courses and cultural sites. As a testimony to its 300-year-old history, residents and visitors alike will discover 18th-century buildings along the former Chemin du Roy, today Gouin Boulevard and Chemin du Bord-du-Lac, in addition to the remnants of Fort Senneville. The shores of Lake Saint-Louis offer a unique setting with café-terrasses, restaurants and boutiques filled with quaint Old World charm. The area today is largely middle and upper-middle class residential zoning along with the strip-malls and other services one might expect in a North American mega-suburb. Large tracts were developed in the period between 1955 and 1975 (such as Dollard-des-Ormeaux, Pierrefonds, Roxboro and Kirkland) where the majority of homes are similarly sized variations of the basic bungalow design, though with traditional Québécois architectural influences.

== Nature ==
The environment and climate of the West Island is almost identical to that of Montreal, and is affected by the same ecological conditions, namely, it is a large open plain of wide plateaus and marshland. The West Island is surrounded by the other islands in the Hochelaga Archipelago as well as Lake of Two Mountains and Lac Saint-Louis and their inter-connected rivers and creeks. The territory was largely agricultural from the 17th century until the middle of the 20th century, when it was then quickly developed into a sprawling network of bedroom suburbs. The West Island has numerous large tracts of uncultivated land, some of which are protected parks while in other cases they're merely the fallow fields of former farms, waiting to be sold to residential property developers. Other portions of land have been designated for the construction of a highway to connect the 40 with the 440, through Kirkland, Pierrefonds, Île Bizard and Laval, but the plan has gone nowhere. A significant portion of the Northwestern corner of the West Island is so sparsely developed it constitutes the last portion of Montreal's pre-settlement ecosystem. Though agriculture on the island is limited to the Macdonald Experimental Farm, the remnants of farmland in Senneville and Pierrefonds are likely to be developed into low-density residential housing. Conserving the remaining segments of local island wilderness has become a focal point of West Island politics over the course of the last thirty years, and is a point of common concern.

=== Flora and fauna ===
Due to the primarily residential character of the West Island and the influence of the City Beautiful and Garden City movements in residential urban-planning in older suburbs on island, the West Island is primarily composed of single-family dwellings on spacious lots organized along small winding roads leading away from large thoroughfares. The area is notable for its many parks and a general emphasis on retaining as much of the rustic, rural charm that characterized the region and led to its development as a popular summer retreat in the early part of the 20th century.

Due to these and other traits, a wide variety of flora and fauna common to the Saint Lawrence river valley can be found in a somewhat balanced natural ecosystem in the largely undeveloped Northwestern corner of the West Island, in addition to the developed low-density residential areas. Flora and fauna found in the West Island fall within the broader spectrum of the Eastern Great Lakes lowland forests ecoregion. Of note is the presence of non-native, borderline hardiness trees, such as the tulip tree, which thrive in small section of Senneville near the Île aux Tourtes Bridge.

Mammalian species that inhabit the greater West Island region include white-tailed deer, coyote and cottontail rabbits. The current population of white-tailed deer is substantial, estimated at over a thousand. It is not uncommon for moose to occasionally cross the ice onto the island in winter. Other species endemic to the western portion of the island include grey squirrels, red squirrels, flying squirrels, mink, chipmunks, raccoons, beaver, skunks, porcupines, martens, woodchucks, muskrat, otters, and fox. The number of bird species varies according to season and migration. During spring and fall many species pass through the area on their way to southern breeding grounds. During winter months, depending on climatic conditions and availability of food in the northern Quebec, many species of birds will take up temporary residence, such as great grey owls, snow buntings, snowy owls, and others. The West Island has enough variation in suitable habitats, such as marsh, ponds, forest and field that many species of birds nest here. Various species of reptiles which can be found include garter snakes, red bellied, brown, milk and the northern water snake. Species of turtles include painted, map and snapping turtle. Amphibians include bullfrogs, green frogs, leopard frogs, spring peepers, wood frogs, and others. Salamanders such as the eastern newt, red backed salamander, blue spotted salamander are also found in the more humid habitats. In the surrounding waters of the west island, notably the Lake Saint-Louis side, large fish species such as northern pike, sturgeon, garfish, carp, catfish, muskellunge can be found. Given the Saint Lawrence's heavy traffic and years of misuse, the ecoregion is negatively effected by high pollution which in turn has resulted in diminished local populations of native fauna. That said, residential development in the greater West Island suburban region (including the Vaudreuil-Soulanges area and parts of Eastern Ontario), has resulted in occasional sightings of black bears, wolves, lynx and cougars (which are generally believed to be extinct though sightings and some physical evidence suggest otherwise) as they themselves are pushed out of their habitats.

=== Nature parks ===
The Morgan Arboretum in Sainte-Anne-de-Bellevue is 610 acres of protected urban forest with over 180 bird species, of which about one-hundred breed within the park. It is also home to the Ecomuseum Zoo, which features a collection of species native to the Saint Lawrence River valley.

Cap Saint Jacques is Montreal's largest park at 711 acres of protected forest, featuring 30 km of cross-country trails, a beach and a small organic farm.

There are also the L'Anse-à-l'Orme Nature Park, Angell Woods, Terra Cotta Park, Centennial Park, the Rapides du Cheval Blanc linear park, and the Bois-de-Liesse Nature Park. These constitute the major forested areas in the West Island, with remaining community green spaces typically designed in conventional park layout. Other principal large open green spaces include Macdonald Experimental Farm and remaining tracts of open land around the Morgan Arboretum in Senneville and western Pierrefonds.

== Municipalities and boroughs ==
The West Island is an informal term for a large territory of low-density middle and upper-middle class housing, low and medium density commercial sectors and vast industrial operations roughly constituting the western third of the Island of Montreal. As such there are no precise boundaries, but rather a fundamentally similar cultural and societal identity. The West Island is not a city, but rather a collection of independent cities, towns and villages in addition to several boroughs of the City of Montreal that share an intimate relationship and identity with the citizens of Montreal, and yet have also developed a unique common identity and strong sense of local character. Again, for this reason it is difficult to say exactly which communities constitute the West Island, though it is largely understood to mean all communities, independent or otherwise, developed on the island of Montreal West of Highway 13 and 32nd Avenue. The West Island generally consists of the following towns, cities and boroughs:

- Baie-D'Urfé – a primarily residential town of 3,900 people notable for a more rural charm, established in 1910. Served by 5 bus lines and a train station.
- Beaconsfield – a small residential city of 19,000 people served by 8 bus lines and 2 train stations, also established in 1910.
- Dollard-des-Ormeaux – a city of about 49,000 residents with large residential, commercial and industrial sectors, established in 1924. It is the West Island's most populous city outside of the Pierrefonds-Roxboro borough of the City of Montreal.
- Dorval – a city of 18,000 initially founded in 1667 and developed initially as a summer retreat for urban dwellers. Today it is largely industrial.
- Kirkland – a city of 20,000 largely developed in the 1970s and 1980s with a sizeable industrial sector.
- Pointe Claire – a city of 30,000 initially founded in 1698 as an important outpost along the fur-trade routes. Pointe Claire has several significant historic sites.
- Sainte-Anne-de-Bellevue – an exceptionally unique 'college-town' of 5,200 initially founded as a parish in 1703, and home to several key West island institutions, including the last fully operational farm on the Island of Montreal, Canada's only national veterans hospital and the second largest English language college in Quebec.
- Senneville – a village of almost 1,000 residents initially founded in 1679 and the former site of the Colonial French Fort Senneville. Senneville has a peculiar local microclimate which allows non-native 'borderline hardiness' plant species to thrive.

The above independent communities constitute the de-merged West island municipalities. In addition, there are two City of Montreal boroughs:

- L'Île-Bizard–Sainte-Geneviève – with a population of 17,500 people, traces its roots back to the fur trade, and features a large nature park, a public college and an old parish church.
- Pierrefonds-Roxboro – the largest West Island community, with a population in excess of 60,000 almost perfectly divided along linguistic lines and featuring the largest nature park on the island, in addition to many small businesses and over 24,000 private dwellings. This borough is served by two stations along the Deux-Montagnes Line of the Agence Métropolitain de Transport, in addition to regular express bus service to and from the City of Montreal throughout the day. This borough is particularly notable for the large number of primary and secondary schools, religious and community centres, playgrounds, sports facilities and other green spaces evenly distributed throughout the territory.

In addition to the areas listed above, the western communities located in the Vaudreuil-Soulanges Regional County Municipality, are part of what is known as the Off-Island area, which is sometimes considered as an extension of the West Island:

- Vaudreuil-Dorion
- Hudson
- Saint-Lazare
- the four communities of Île Perrot

== Demographics ==
Population

City	Area km^{2}	2021 Census	2016 Census	2011 Census	2006 Census	2001 Census	1996 Census
Dorval	20.87	19,302	18,980	18,208	18,088	17,706	17,572
L'Île-Dorval	0.18	30	5	5	0	0	2
Pointe-Claire	18.87	33,488	31,380	30,790	30,161	29,286	28,435
Kirkland	9.64	19,413	20,151	21,253	20,491	20,434	18,678
Beaconsfield	11.01	19.277	19.324	19,505	19,194	19,310	19,414
Baie-D'Urfé	6.03	3,764	3,823	3,850	3,902	3,813	3,774
Sainte-Anne-de-Bellevue	10.57	5,027	4,958	5,073	5,197	5,062	4,700
Senneville	7.49	951	921	920	962	970	906
Dollard-des-Ormeaux	15.10	48,403	48,899	49,637	48,930	48,206	47,826
Total demerged municipalities	99.76	149,655	148,441	149,241	146,925	144,787	141,307
Pierrefonds	24.91				59,093	54,963	53,151
Roxboro	2.22				5,948	5,642	5,785
L'Île-Bizard	22.77				14,325	13,861	13,038
Sainte-Genevieve	0.86				3,265	3.278	3,339
Total former municipalities of Montreal	50.75				82,631	77,744	75,313
Pierrefonds-Roxboro	27.13	70,382	69,297	68,410	65,041	60,605	58,936
L'Île-Bizard–Sainte-Geneviève	23.63	18,885	18,413	18,097	17,590	17,139	16,377
Total city of Montreal boroughs	50.75	89,267	87,710	86,507	82,631	77,744	75,313
West Island	150.51	238,922	236,151	235,738	229,556	222,531	216,620

=== Language spoken at home ===
From the Canada 2006 Census:

Language	Population	Percentage (%)
English only	70,405	48.4%
French only	33,335	22.9%
Both English and French	1,960	1.3%
Other languages	39,855	27.4%

The West Island is home to Quebec's largest concentration of native English-speakers, most of whom are bilingual. It includes West Island municipalities only, not West-Island boroughs of Montreal. The West Island can also claim to have the highest demographic concentration of German Canadians in the province of Quebec, with an even higher concentration located in the Town of Baie-D'Urfé where the Alexander von Humboldt Schule Montréal German International School is located.

== Education ==
Post-secondary institutions

Macdonald Campus of McGill University traces its roots back to 1905, when Macdonald College was originally constructed as an agricultural college. The buildings which currently house John Abbott College are those of the original Macdonald College, which in 1972 became a satellite campus of McGill University and moved into newer buildings east of the original site. The Macdonald Campus supports McGill's Morgan Arboretum, the J. S. Marshall Radar Observatory and the last operational farm on the Island of Montreal, in addition to the Canadian Aviation Heritage Centre.

John Abbott College was opened in the old Macdonald College buildings located in Sainte-Anne-de-Bellevue in 1971 and has since become one of the largest CEGEPs in Quebec, with well-over 7,000 students. The campus was initially split between two sites until the construction of the Casgrain Centre in 1981, and a new science and technology pavilion is currently being completed along with campus-wide renovations and upgrades. The site features the nearly completely abandoned Brittain Hall, the former men's dormitory. In this respect, Brittain Hall is a near identical copy of Stewart Hall (the original women's dorm), and features the same stacked 'gym-cafeteria-pool' layout, along with massive fireplaces and other features of an Edwardian-era rural college dormitory. Today it is still owned by McGill University and is almost exclusively used for film and television production. Despite a rapid increase in school population and the subsequent lack of space, there are no plans to renovate or rehabilitate Brittain Hall at the moment. Another feature of the campus is the location of steam pipes and access tunnels located directly under the sidewalks, so as to permit natural snow-removal. Moreover, there are a series of tunnels connecting all buildings on campus, designed so as to facilitate moving about the sprawling campus. A portion of the system connecting Stewart to Brittain Hall, has been closed since the 1970s and remains largely inaccessible.

Cégep Gérald-Godin was opened in a former novitiate of the Fathers of the Holy Cross in 1999 and is a prominent West Island post-modern architectural achievement. It features Salle Pauline-Julien, a performing arts venue, and is home to roughly 1,200 students. It is so far the only uniquely Francophone CEGEP in the West Island. The development of the CEGEP has had a positive impact on the development of the village of Sainte-Geneviève as a smaller primarily Francophone equivalent to Sainte-Anne-de-Bellevue.

Public primary and secondary

English-language instruction in the West island is provided primarily by the Lester B. Pearson School Board while French-language instruction is provided by the Commission scolaire Marguerite-Bourgeoys. The LBPSB counts some 28,000 students in 12 high schools, 40 elementary schools, 2 adult education centres and 4 vocational schools. The CSMB counts some 45,000 students across a larger territory principally focused on the western portion of the island, with 61 elementary schools, 12 high schools, 2 specialized schools, 6 vocational schools and 4 adult-education centres.

Important West Island public high schools include, but are not limited to:

- Beaconsfield High School – founded in Beaconsfield in 1958, 1130 students.
- De l'Altitude High School, a French High School located in the former location of Riverdale High School – once one of the largest schools in the West Island (approximately 2,600 students in the early 1970s until the early 1980s), Riverdale's population declined significantly in the last thirty years of its existence, but it still remains a special place in the community of Pierrefonds. Riverdale High School was forced to close and merge with the nearby Pierrefonds Comprehensive High School, now Pierrefonds Community High School, in 2019.
- John Rennie High School – founded in Pointe Claire in 1955 it boasts the Sports-Etudes program for student athletes as well as a highly regarded local theatre and dramatic arts program.
- Pierrefonds Community High School – founded in 1971 as "Pierrefonds Comprehensive High School" in Pierrefonds to support Catholic francophone and anglophone students, it is an architecturally significant school given its open concept design along an axial core, not to mention industrial visual cues, such as exposed concrete walls and overhead pipes, small windows and rooms without doors. Roughly 1200 students attend PCHS, which is co-located with the LBPSB administered West Island Career Centre (WICC). PCHS offers an international baccalaureate program and shares its grounds with the George Springate community sports complex.
- Saint Thomas High School – public high schools in the West Island, St. Thomas is consistently ranked in the top-ten of Quebec's schools. It offers an IB program and is home to some 1,300 students. It is located in the location of the former Lindsay Place High School, which was founded in Pointe-Claire in 1962 with 1,600 students, and was one of the largest in the West Island. The two schools merged in July 2021.

== Media ==
The West Island is served by several weekly newspapers including the English-language The Suburban, West Island Gazette and Montreal Times as well as Cités Nouvelles, published in French (and formerly published in bilingual format as Cités Nouvelles–City News up until 2010).

The North Shore News once served the communities of Pierrefonds, Roxboro, and Dollard des Ormeaux when those communities were primarily focused along access routes to and from Gouin and Sources boulevards and the Sunnybrook and Roxboro train stations. Though the publication was touted as the West Island's only independent weekly throughout the 1960s and 1970s, it died out in the 1980s. Another longtime publication was the English language The Chronicle, which began in 1925 and ended in 2015.

A local radio station CFOX broadcast from Pointe Claire at 1470 kHz in the AM broadcast band from 1960 to 1989. It offered several different program formats including country as well as top-40 music before its sale to the CKO all-news network. Declining revenue precipitated the station's closure in 1989.

== Sports and recreation ==
The West Island boasts multiple public and private sports and recreation facilities, many of which are co-located at local secondary schools or gathered around municipal buildings. As with many suburban areas, residents have access to numerous community pools, parks, greens and playgrounds, in addition to soccer and football fields, rugby pitches and baseball diamonds. All West Island residents have access to amateur sports clubs and associations, and minor-level hockey, soccer, basketball and football are all quite popular. Moreover, various leagues and associations are generally very open to accepting residents from all communities. As with most Canadian communities, there is at least one hockey rink in every city or town in the West Island. These facilities have, in the past, also served as venues for rock concerts and the like. A notable example was the old Pierrefonds Arena, demolished in the late-1990s, which once attracted rock bands like the Eagles and Black Sabbath when it was difficult for West Island youth to reach downtown concert venues.

Dollard-des-Ormeaux and Pointe Claire both have large civic centres replete with Olympic-sized pools and diving platforms, and the West Island has a youth subculture focused on swimming, diving and life-guarding at community pools.

The well known Royal Golf Club of Montreal is located in Ile-Bizard and is one of eight golf greens in the West Island, the majority of which are private. Other typical West Island sports and recreation facilities include numerous tennis clubs and courts, curling clubs, and the occasional bocci pitch.

Other notable West Island sports and recreation facilities include the West Island YMCA and YM/YWHA, Dollard-des-Ormeaux's Centennial Park (with hills ideally suited for tobogganing and forests interlaced with cross-country ski trails), the Cap Saint Jacques nature park (which features the only remaining beach open to the public on the island), and the facilities affiliated with John Abbott College. In addition, numerous sports leagues for youth utilize facilities shared with local primary and secondary schools.

The area is home to the North Shore Lions Bantam level football team as well as their older team the North Shore Mustangs, which compete at a midget division 1 AAA level, which holds the most division and provincial titles in Quebec Midget Football League history.

== Points of interest ==
Fritz Farm, a community cultural centre in Baie-D'Urfé located at 20477 Chemin Lakeshore on a large common green bordering picturesque Lake Saint-Louis, is one of several examples of preserved heritage homes dating back to the 18th century that can be found in Baie-D'Urfé, which are a direct link to the West Island's colonial era.

Église Sainte-Geneviève, a parish church established in 1741 by Antoine Faucon and completed in its present form in 1844, is located at the intersection of Rue St-Louis and Gouin Boulevard West in the village of Sainte-Geneviève and is part of a larger complex that includes a presbytery and cemetery and a municipal park along the banks of the scenic Rivière des Prairies.

Saint-Joachim de Pointe-Claire Church & Pointe-Claire Village, another parish church established in the mid-18th century, though completed only in 1885 in a Gothic-revival style and designed by noted local church architect Victor Bourgeau, is located at 2 Ste-Anne Street in Pointe Claire Village. Permanent settlement in this part of the West Island dates back at least as far as 1710, when the emblematic Pointe-Claire Windmill was completed. The Village features many 19th century and early 20th century buildings and forms an important local small-business sector. There are many restaurants and boutiques in the area, in addition to the exclusive Beaconsfield Golf Club and the Pointe-Claire Curling Club. Othe sites of interest include the Pointe-Claire Windmill & Summer Retreat of the Congregation Notre Dame.

Centennial Hall, in Beaconsfield, is a community cultural centre and small-scale performance venue.

Stewart Hall, in Pointe-Claire, is an art gallery and community cultural centre and small-scale performance venue.

The Museum of Local History and Heritage is located at 1850 Lakeshore Drive and adjacent to the large linear parks that stretch from Dorval along the edge of Lac Saint-Louis east towards Old Lachine Village, where the old public beaches used to be. There are several marinas in the area and each summer the lake is filled with diverse pleasure craft. Wind-surfing here is quite popular, though public bathing is illegal and generally discouraged. Fishing is popular, though again, it is unwise to consume anything caught.

The Morgan Arboretum and Ecomuseum Zoo is a zoo dedicated to animal species endemic to the Eastern Great Lakes lowland forest, located in one of the last old growth example of the type on-island. The Ecomuseum is, along with Montréal's Biodome and Insectarium, one of the key local public zoological institutions that have found innovative solutions to the problems with 'traditional zoos'.

Old Saint-Anne's Village and the Sainte-Anne-de-Bellevue Canal, another area in the West Island where permanent settlement dates back to the mid-late 17th century, Sainte-Anne's became a focal point for local services with the development of Macdonald College and the Veterans Hospital during the early 20th century. The Village has many restaurants and bars and other services supporting the comparatively large student population. The area features a boardwalk, the old Rex Theatre and numerous specialty shops. Other features include the Gallipeault Bridge which connects Sainte-Anne's to Ile Perot.

The Canadian Aviation Heritage Centre and the Macdonald Experimental Farm are both located at McGill's Macdonald Campus in Sainte-Anne-de-Bellevue.

Fort Senneville, which was originally built in 1671 and destroyed and rebuilt twice, the Fort was captured and destroyed by Benedict Arnold in 1776 during manœuvres associated with the Battle of The Cedars during the American War of Independence. A commemorative plaque located along Chemin Senneville by the Lake of Two Mountains records the location of the battle associated with the fall of the Fort. All that remains today is part of the windmill which doubled as a watch-tower and the foundations of the seigneurial house, if not some portions of the walls. The site is on private property though the proprietor has been known to allow visitors if they ask politely.

Cap-Saint-Jacques Nature Park is the largest nature park on the island also features the only remaining public beach and an organic farm.

Rapides du Cheval Blanc is listed as one of the ten Eco-territories of Montreal. The park has a view of the Whitehorse rapids and a wooded area.

Bois-de-Liesse Nature Park is the second largest nature park on-island and home to some protected heritage properties.

== Notable people ==
- Eugenie Bouchard — Tennis player
- Evelyne Brochu — Actress
- Jason Demers — Professional ice hockey player
- Geoffrey Kelley — Provincial politician and former MNA for Jacques-Cartier
- Anthony Duclair — Professional ice hockey player
- Ann Lambert — playwright, author, and professor
- Mike Matheson — Professional ice hockey player
- Thomas Mulcair — Former NDP leader and federal politician
- Sergio Momesso — Retired professional ice hockey player
- Harley Morenstein — Internet personality and founder of Epic Meal Time
- Caroline Rhea — Actress
- Norma Shearer — Actress
- Joseph Veleno — Professional ice hockey player
- Marc-Édouard Vlasic — Professional ice hockey player
- François Legault — 32nd premier of Quebec
- Vincent Lecavalier — Professional ice hockey player

== See also ==
- Lac-Saint-Louis (electoral district)
- Pierrefonds—Dollard (electoral district)
- Notre-Dame-de-Grâce—Lachine
- Saint-Laurent
- LaSalle—Émard
- Boroughs of Montreal
- List of former boroughs of Montreal
- Districts of Montreal
- Municipal reorganization in Quebec
