= Joseph Andrew Lapointe =

Joseph Andrew Lapointe, also known as Andy Lapointe, was a senior research scientist at Domtar Research Centre in Senneville Quebec. He was involved in the development of mechanical processes and equipment at the research level for over 25 years. During his time at Domtar he specialized in the development of chipping technology and has a number of patents and patents pending in his field. He assisted in the development of over 30 sawmills improving the quality of their chips to meet the requirements of specific pulp mills. Prior to joining Domtar, he was with the Pulp and Paper Research Institute of Canada (Paprican) where he co-invented the Papriformer and was involved in its development. This wet sheet former has been the subject of numerous papers and is considered one of the major advances in papermaking technology. The Papriformer received the Governor General's award for Engineering Design in 1975. Lapointe has also been responsible for a number of analytical devices (sources coming soon) which are in use in universities, research centres and technical laboratories.

== The Papriformer ==
The Papriformer was Lapointe's biggest accomplishment as an engineer. American companies sought his invention and he was set to battle the rights in a Court of Law. Surprisingly, Lapointe died of a three-wheeler accident just days prior to his appearance in court.
