= Senneville =

- Village municipality
- Village of Senneville
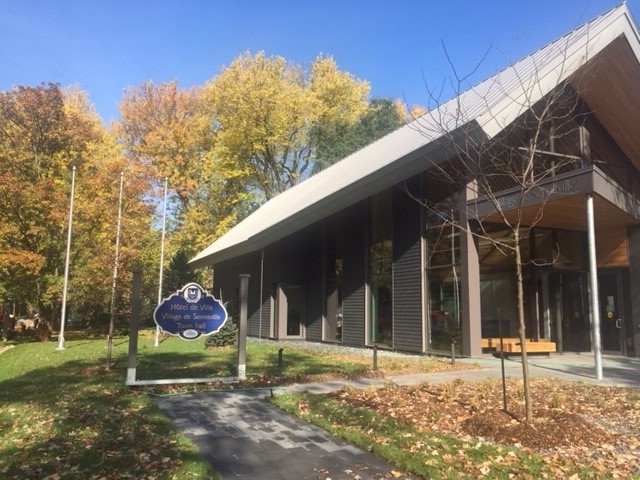
- Senneville City Hall
- Motto: Né sous le lys il fleurit sous l'érable ("Born under the lily, flourishing under the maple")
- Location on the Island of Montreal

- Location in southern Quebec
- Coordinates: 45°25′N 73°57′W
- Country: Canada
- Province: Quebec
- Region: Montreal
- RCM: None
- Founded: 1679
- Incorporated: 1895
- Merged into Pierrefonds-Senneville: January 1, 2002
- Reconstituted: January 1, 2006
- Named for: Jacques Le Ber de St-Paul de Senneville

Government
  - Mayor: Julie Brisebois
  - Federal riding: Lac-Saint-Louis
  - Prov. riding: Jacques-Cartier

Area
  - Total: 18.60 km^{2} (7.18 sq mi)
  - Land: 7.45 km^{2} (2.88 sq mi)

Population (2021)
  - Total: 951
  - Density: 127.7/km^{2} (331/sq mi)
  - Pop 2016-2021: ▲3.3%
  - Dwellings: 377
- Time zone: UTC−5 (EST)
  - Summer (DST): UTC−4 (EDT)
- Postal code(s): H9X
- Area codes: 514 and 438
- Highways: A-40 (TCH)
- Website: villagesenneville.org

Senneville (French pronunciation: [sɛnvil]) is an affluent on-island suburban village on the western tip of the Island of Montreal, Quebec, Canada. It is the wealthiest town in the West Island.

Situated close to the city of Montreal, it was historically a popular location for the country houses of wealthy Montrealers. Attractions include multiple golf clubs, a yacht club, and La Ferme du Fort Senneville, an organic demonstration farm. The Morgan Arboretum was founded here in 1953, and is today managed by Macdonald College; an important bird sanctuary, it is open to the public year-round. Fort Senneville was constructed here in 1671, but its ruins are on private land and are not accessible to the public. The historic core of the village was designated a National Historic Site of Canada in 2002.

== History ==
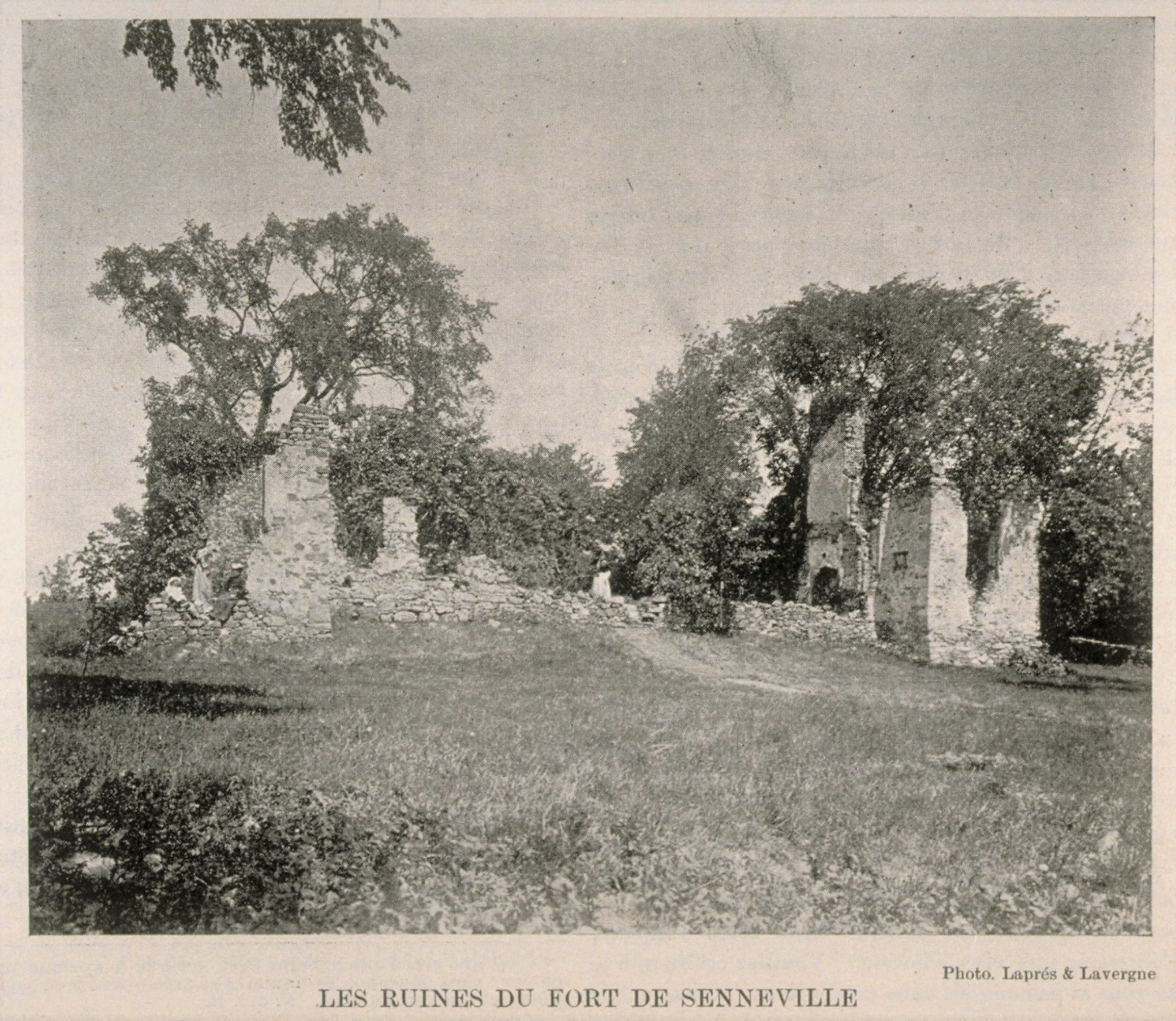
Ruins of Fort Senneville in 1899

Because of its strategic location at the far western end of Montreal Island, a stockade fort was built there in 1671.

In 1679, Jacques Le Ber, fur trader from Montreal, bought the Boisbriand Fief from Michel Sidrac Dugé, and renamed it to Senneville after Senneville-sur-Fécamp, his hometown in France. Le Ber operated a fur trading post there and built a stone windmill at the fort in 1686, which also served as a focal point for settlers in the area.

In 1689, the Battle of the Lake of Two Mountains took place nearby.

1n 1691, the stockade and windmill were burned down by Iroquois and a new stone fort was constructed in 1702–1703, which lasted until 1776 when it was destroyed during the American Revolutionary War by Continental Army troops under Benedict Arnold.

The Village Municipality of Senneville was established on January 12, 1895, when it separated from the Parish of Sainte-Anne du Bout-de-l’Isle. The Senneville Post Office operated from 1911 to 1957.

On January 1, 2002, as part of the 2002–2006 municipal reorganization of Montreal, Senneville was merged into the city of Montreal and became part of the borough of Pierrefonds-Senneville. However, after a change of government and a 2004 referendum, it was re-constituted as an independent village municipality on January 1, 2006.

== Geography ==
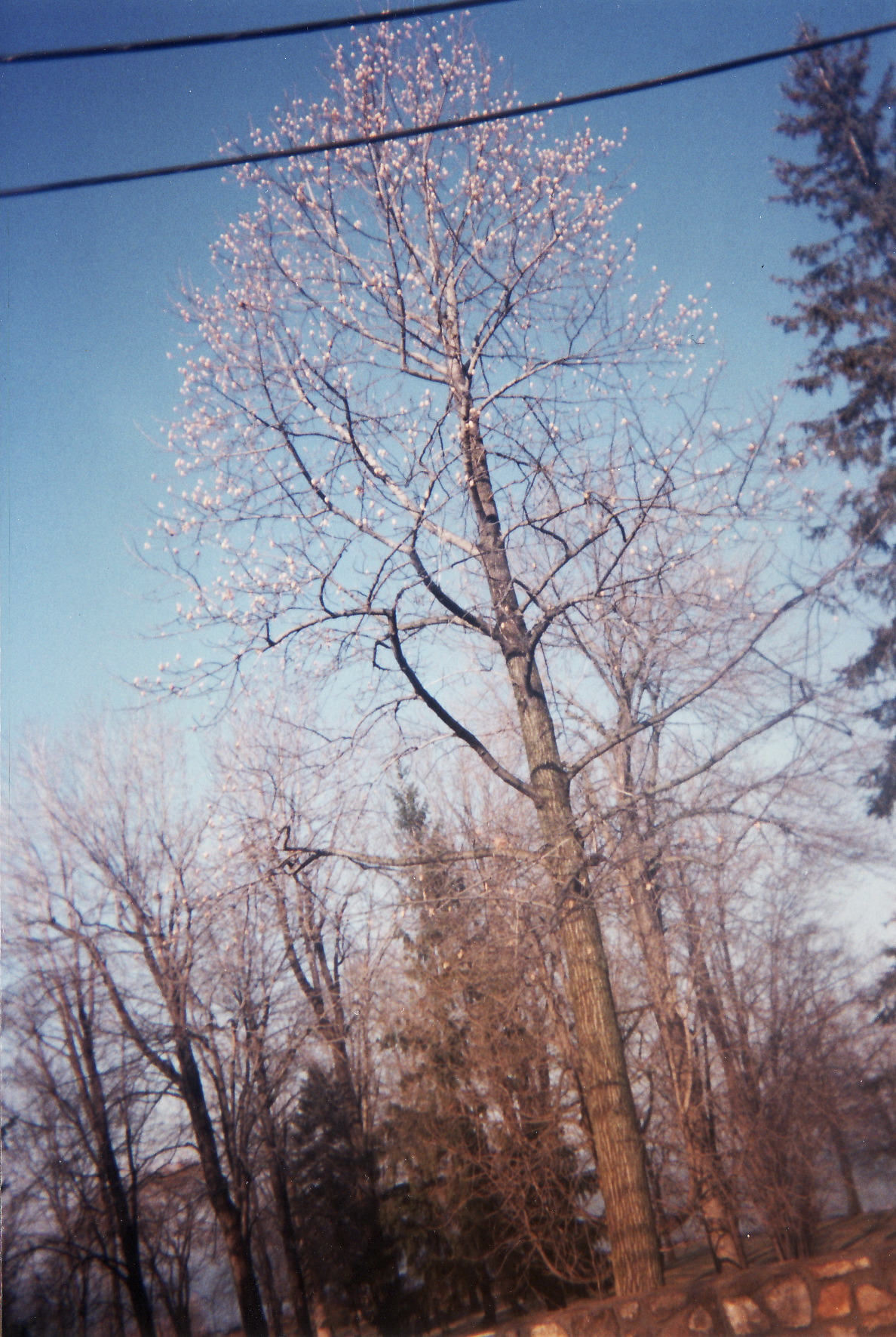
Non-native plant species of borderline hardiness, such as this tuliptree, thrive in Senneville's favourable microclimate

All of Senneville lies over dolomite. In contrast to the monotony of this bedrock, there are many types of soil in the municipality. Clay is common near the northeastern corner and part of the western shores. Sand dominates many inland areas; it is rapidly drained in places but often has impeded drainage due to the type of hardpan which develops in podzols. Near-shore areas along the northern margin have extensive areas of glacial till which forms a calcareous well-drained loam.

The loamy slopes overlooking Lake of Two Mountains are excellent for fruit trees and tender plants due to fertile soils, good drainage, and the moderating effect on microclimate provided by the lake.

== Demographics ==
Historical populations
Year	Pop.	±%
1901	293	—
1911	418	+42.7%
1921	489	+17.0%
1931	526	+7.6%
1941	555	+5.5%
1951	878	+58.2%
1956	979	+11.5%
1961	1,261	+28.8%
1966	1,413	+12.1%
1971	1,412	−0.1%
1976	1,333	−5.6%
1981	1,221	−8.4%
1986	1,101	−9.8%
1991	961	−12.7%
1996	906	−5.7%
2001	970	+7.1%
2006	962	−0.8%
2011	920	−4.4%
2016	921	+0.1%
2021	951	+3.3%
Source: Statistics Canada

In the 2021 Census of Population conducted by Statistics Canada, Senneville had a population of 951 living in 352 of its 377 total private dwellings, a change of 3.3% from its 2016 population of 921. With a land area of 7.45 km^{2} (2.88 sq mi), it had a population density of 127.7/km^{2} (330.6/sq mi) in 2021.

Canada census – Senneville community profile

	2021	2016
Population	951 (+3.3% from 2016)	921 (+0.1% from 2011)
Land area	7.45 km^{2} (2.88 sq mi)	7.53 km^{2} (2.91 sq mi)
Population density	127.7/km^{2} (331/sq mi)	122.4/km^{2} (317/sq mi)
Median age	49.6 (M: 49.6, F: 49.6)	49.0 (M: 49.3, F: 47.9)
Private dwellings	377 (total)	375 (total)
Median household income	$147,000	$116,224

References: 2021 2016

Visible Minorities (2021)
Ethnicity	Population	Percentage (%)
Not a visible minority	825	86.8%
Visible minorities	125	13.2%

=== Language ===
According to the Office québécois de la langue française, Senneville has been officially recognized as a bilingual municipality since 2005-11-02.

Canada Census Mother Tongue - Senneville, Quebec
Census	Total	French			English			French & English			Other		
Year	Responses	Count	Trend	Pop %	Count	Trend	Pop %	Count	Trend	Pop %	Count	Trend	Pop %
2021	950	290	▼3.3%	30.5%	430	0.0%	45.3%	55	▲57.1%	5.8%	150	▲7.1%	15.8%
2016	920	300	▼6.3%	32.6%	430	▼3.4%	46.7%	35	▲40.0%	3.8%	140	▲7.7%	15.2%
2011	920	320	▼7.2%	34.8%	445	▼15.2%	48.3%	25	▲ n/a%	2.7%	130	▲62.5%	14.1%
2006	950	345	▼21.6%	36.3%	525	▲18.0%	55.3%	0	▼100.0%	0.0%	80	▲0.5%	8.4%
2001	970	440	▲37.5%	45.4%	445	▼9.2%	45.9%	10	▲ n/a%	1.0%	75	0.0%	7.7%
1996	905	320	n/a	35.4%	490	n/a	54.1%	0	n/a	0.0%	75	n/a	8.3%

Home Language (2021)
Language	Population	Percentage (%)
English	575	61%
French	245	26%
Other	55	6%

== Government ==
In addition, there are six municipal councillors:

1. François Vaqué (District 1)
2. Alain Savoie (District 2)
3. Christopher Jackson (District 3)
4. Michelle Jackson Trepanier (District 4)
5. Dennis Dicks (District 5)
6. Peter Csenar (District 6)

=== Former mayors ===
List of former mayors:

- Louis-Joseph Forget (1896–1911)
- Frederic Lumb Wanklyn (1911–1914)
- Guy Boyer (1914–1915)
- Frederick Cleveland Morgan (1915–1919)
- John Lancelot Todd (1919–1920)
- R. MacD. Paterson (1920–1922)
- George M. Bosworth (1922–1925)
- Robert R. Macaulay (1925–1930)
- William A. Fallis (1930–1933)
- John Y. Phillips (1933–1935)
- William George M. Stuart (1935–1936)
- Thomas Arnold (1936–1937, 1939–1943)
- Joseph Davison Weir (1937–1939)
- Guy Mansfield Todd (1943–1947)
- Luther H. D. Sutherland (1947–1951)
- Adélard Raymond (1951–1959)
- Edward R. Smallhorn (1959–1967)
- Bernard Whittaker Burgess (1967–1975)
- Cameron F. Duff (1975–1986)
- Ovila Crevier (1986–1995)
- George MacLeish (1995–2002, 2006–2013)
- Jane Foukai (Guest (2013–2017)
- Julie Brisebois (2017–present)

== Education ==
The Centre de services scolaire Marguerite-Bourgeoys operates Francophone public schools, but were previously operated by the Commission scolaire Marguerite-Bourgeoys until June 15, 2020. The change was a result of a law passed by the Quebec government that changed the school board system from denominational to linguistic. It operates the École secondaire Saint-Georges.

The Lester B. Pearson School Board (LBPSB) operates Anglophone public schools in the area.

- The zoned elementary school is Dorset Elementary School in Baie-D'Urfé

== Notable people ==
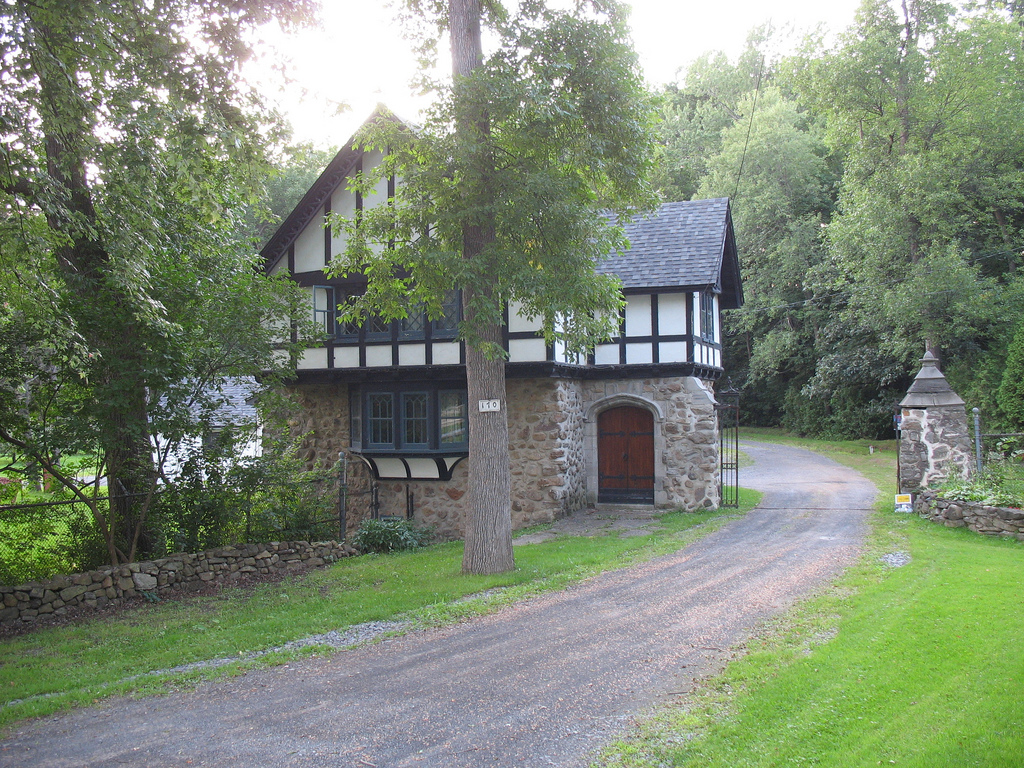
Gatekeeper's lodge at 170 Senneville Road

Notable past and present residents include:

- Ken Dryden, politician, lawyer, businessman, author, and former NHL goalie
- Corey Hart, singer-songwriter
- Janina Fialkowska, classical pianist
- John Abbott, the third Prime Minister of Canada, lived at 170 Senneville Road
- Christopher Plummer, stage, film, and television actor was the great-grandson of John Abbott and lived in his house most of his youth
- Lino Saputo, founder of the Canadian cheese manufacturer Saputo Inc.

== See also ==
- List of anglophone communities in Quebec
- List of former boroughs
- Montreal Merger
- Municipal reorganization in Quebec
