= Cap-Saint-Jacques Nature Park =

Large nature park in Montreal, Canada

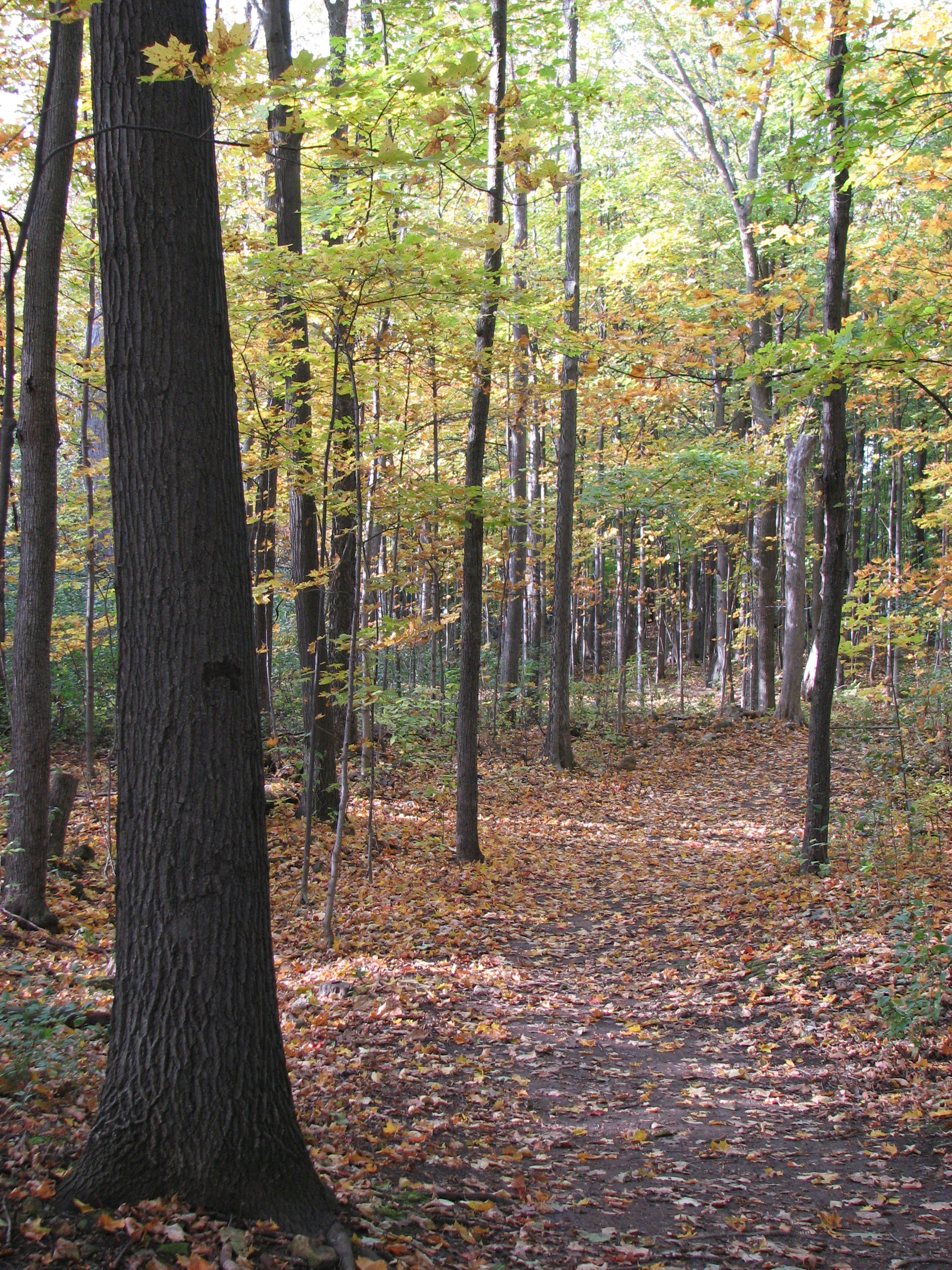
- A path in the park

- Location within Montreal
- Type: Nature park
- Location: Pierrefonds-Roxboro, Montreal, Quebec, Canada
- Coordinates: 45°27′58″N 73°55′52″W
- Area: 302 hectares (750 acres)
- Operator: City of Montreal
- Open: sunrise to sunset
- Status: Open all year
- Public transit: 68 Pierrefonds
- Website: Official website

Cap-Saint-Jacques Nature Park is a large nature park in the Pierrefonds-Roxboro borough of Montreal, Quebec, Canada.

It is located in the West Island at the junction of the Lake of Two Mountains and the Rivière des Prairies. Situated on a peninsula, three quarters of the park is bordered by water. At 330 ha (820 acres), it is the largest park in Montreal.

The land for the park was purchased by the City of Montreal on 15 February 1980 from the Congregation des Soeurs des Saints Noms de Jesus et de Marie.

The park features a natural sand beach and an organic farm, which raises animals and grows organic produce. Farm activities are offered by the non profit D-Trois-Pierres.

The park's bays are home to a variety of animals, including the map turtle. Environmental science activities are offered by the Groupe uni des éducateurs-naturalistes et professionnels en environnement (GUEPE). The park includes stands of silver birch and sugar maple, with a sugar shack where visitors can watch the production of maple syrup, in season. The park has 26 km (16 mi) of hiking trails and 32 km (20 mi) of trails for cross country skiing.

The name "Cap St. Jacques" was written on maps as early as 1744. The land mass south of the (cape) of Cap St. Jacques is the Jacques Cartier electoral district. The French Wikipedia article conjectures the name comes from Jacques Bizard, but both Jacques Cartier and Jacques Bizard have not been named Saints. There is a street named "St. Jacques" in the city of Montreal dated 1672. There is also a land area called the Saint-Jacques Escarpment on the island of Montreal.

== Plans ==
As of 2020, the City of Montreal has a plan to include the park into the future Grand Parc de l'Ouest.
