= Bois-de-Liesse Nature Park =

Large nature park in Montreal, Canada

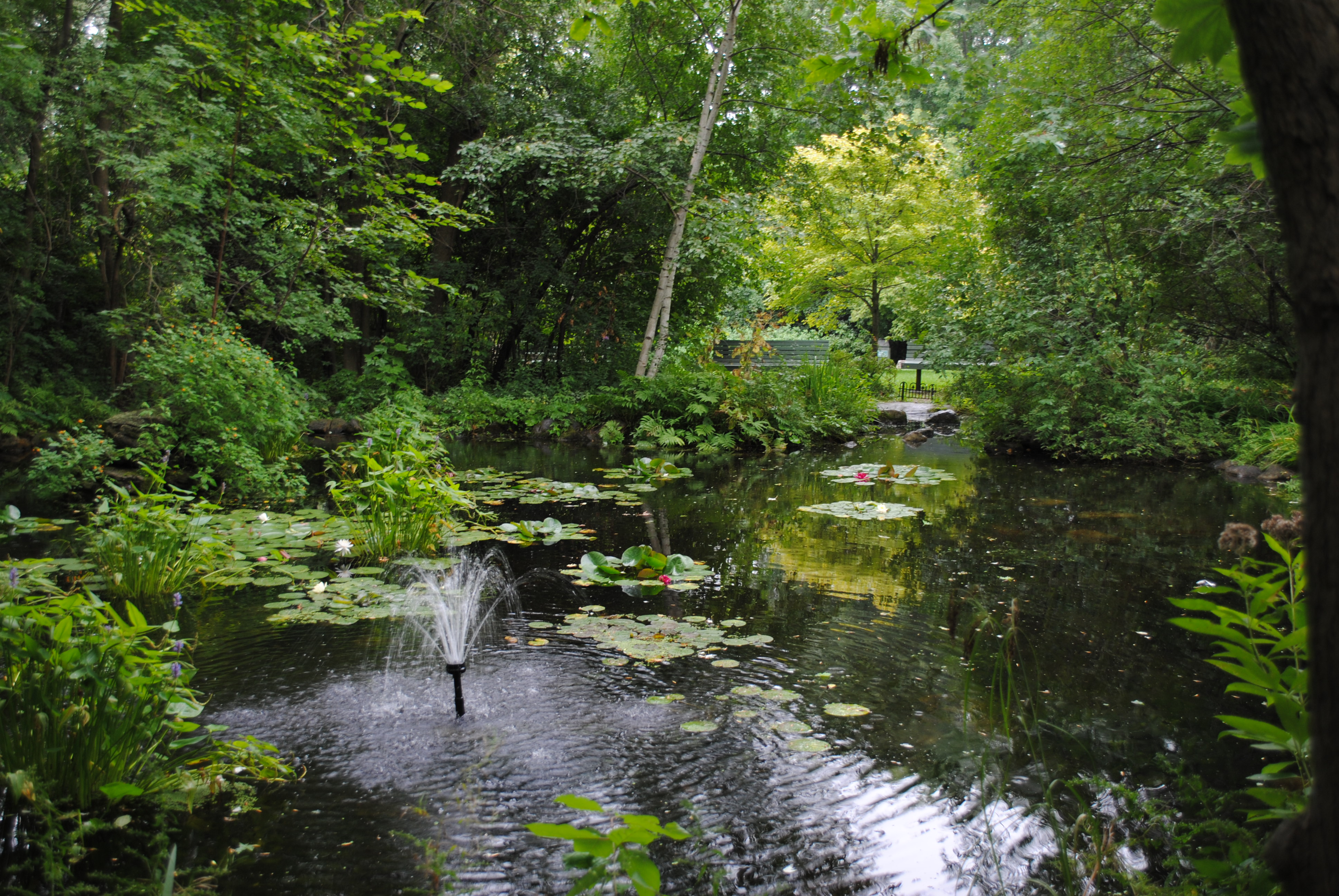
- A wetland in the park

- Location within Montreal
- Interactive map of Bois-de-Liesse Nature Park
- Type: Nature park
- Location: Island of Montreal, Quebec, Canada
- Coordinates: 45°30′20″N 73°45′50″W
- Area: 158 hectares (390 acres)
- Created: 1984
- Operator: City of Montreal
- Open: sunrise to sunset
- Status: Open all year
- Public transit: STM Bus: 175
- Website: Official website

The Bois-de-Liesse Nature Park is a large nature park that spans several cities on the northwestern part of the Island of Montreal in Quebec, Canada.

Most of the western reach of the park is in Dollard-des-Ormeaux, with a small part in Dorval. The rest of the park spans the Montreal boroughs of Ahuntsic-Cartierville, Pierrefonds-Roxboro and Saint-Laurent. Bertrand Brook runs through the park.

The park is named after the Côte-de-Liesse, a former municipality that existed in the area, before being divided into Dorval, Lachine and Saint-Laurent in 1957. The town was named for Liesse-Notre-Dame in France.

The park was established in 1984 and has an area of 158 hectares (390 acres). The reception center is located in Pitfield House, which was built between 1952 and 1954 according to plans by the architectural firm Archibald, Illsley and Templeton. It was acquired by the Montreal Urban Community in 1979.
