= Sainte-Anne-de-Bellevue =

- City
- City of Sainte-Anne-de-Bellevue
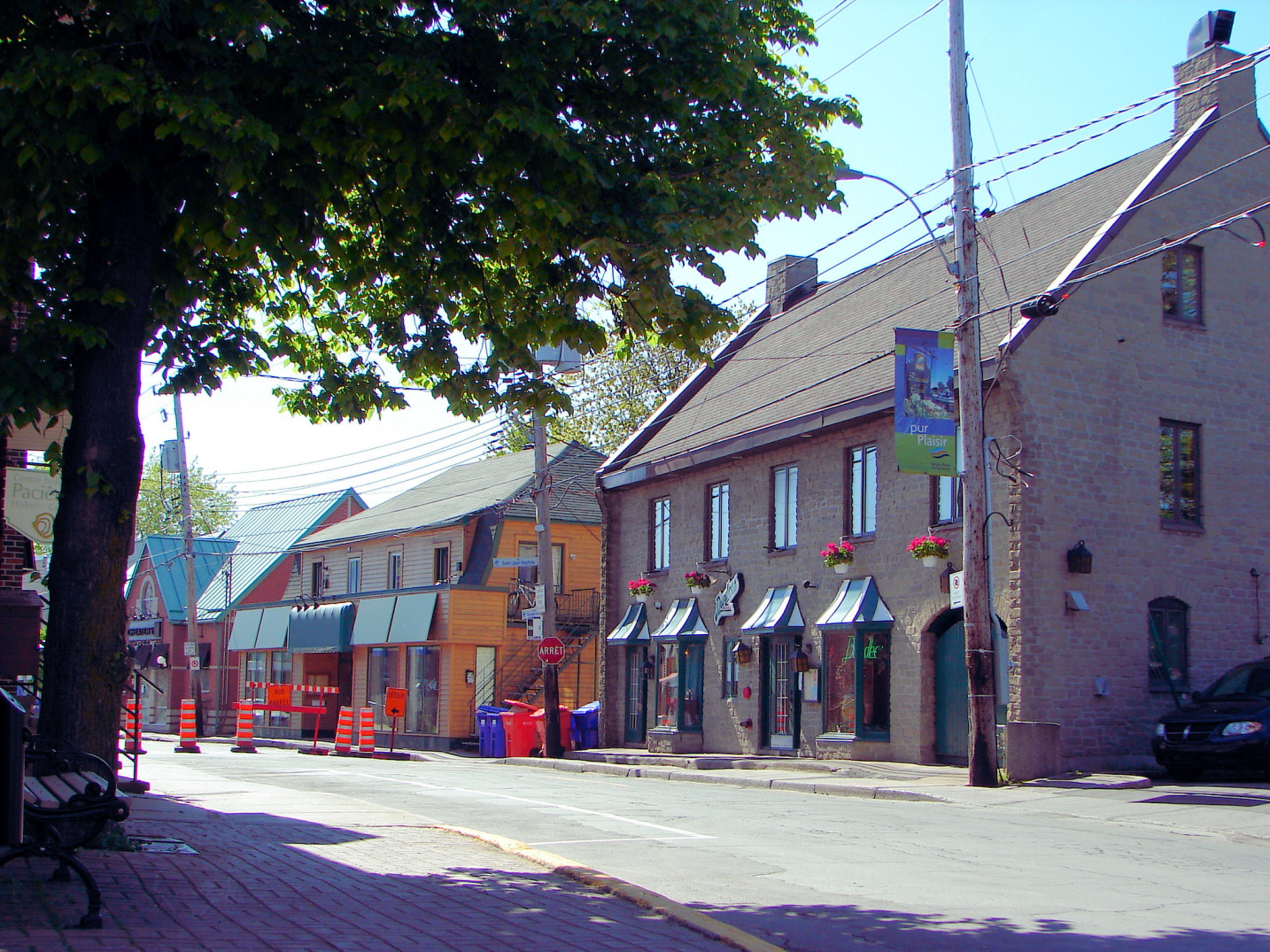
- Motto: Omnia per laborem et fidem (All through work and faith)
- Location on the Island of Montreal

- Location in southern Quebec.
- Coordinates: 45°24′14″N 73°57′09″W
- Country: Canada
- Province: Quebec
- Region: Montreal
- RCM: None
- Founded: 1703
- Constituted: January 1, 2006
- Named for: Saint Anne

Government
  - Mayor: Michel Boudreault
  - Federal riding: Lac-Saint-Louis
  - Prov. riding: Jacques-Cartier

Area
  - Total: 11.18 km^{2} (4.32 sq mi)
  - Land: 10.46 km^{2} (4.04 sq mi)

Population (2021)
  - Total: 5,027
  - Density: 480.8/km^{2} (1,245/sq mi)
  - Pop 2016-2021: ▲1.4%
  - Dwellings: 2,304
- Time zone: UTC−5 (EST)
  - Summer (DST): UTC−4 (EDT)
- Postal code(s): H9X
- Area codes: 514 and 438
- Highways A-20: A-40 (TCH)
- Website: ville.sainte-anne-de-bellevue.qc.ca

Sainte-Anne-de-Bellevue (/sənt æn də bɛlvjuː/, French pronunciation: [sɛ̃t an də bɛlvy]) is an on-island suburb located at the western tip of the Island of Montreal in southwestern Quebec, Canada. It is the second oldest community in Montreal's West Island, having been founded as a parish in 1703. The oldest, Dorval, was founded in 1667.

Points of interest include the Sainte-Anne-de-Bellevue Canal (a National Historic Site of Canada), the Sainte-Anne Veterans' Hospital, the Morgan Arboretum, and the L'Anse-à-l'Orme Nature Park. Sainte-Anne-de-Bellevue is also home to John Abbott College and McGill University's Macdonald Campus, which includes the J. S. Marshall Radar Observatory and the Canadian Aviation Heritage Centre as well as about 2 square kilometres (0.77 sq mi) of farmland which separates the small town from neighbouring Baie-d'Urfé.

== History ==
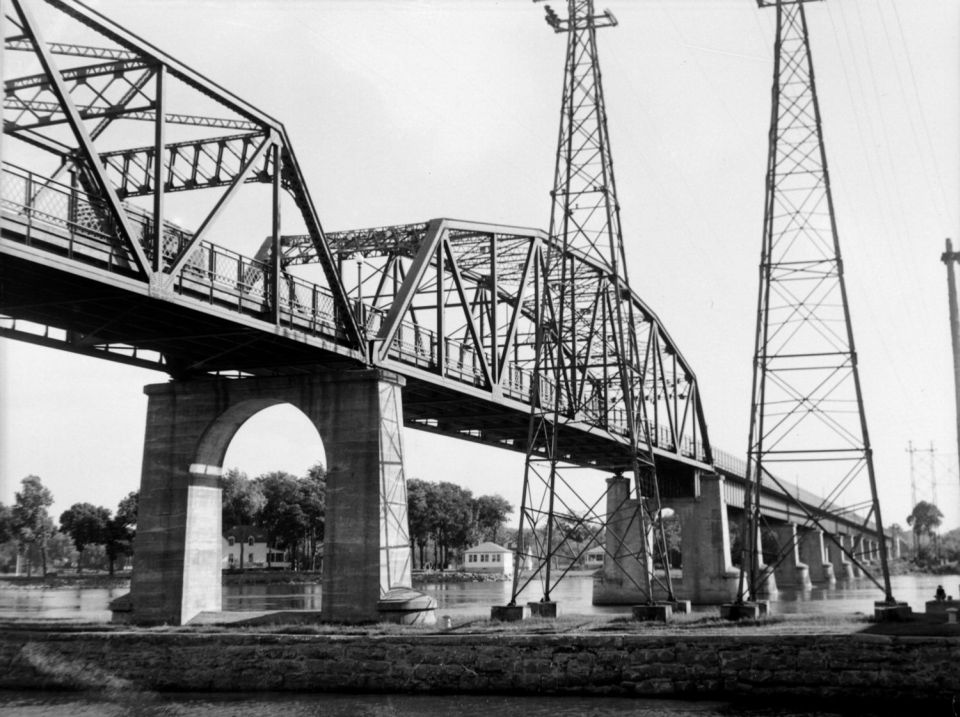
Galipeault Bridge between Sainte-Anne-de-Bellevue and l'île Perrot. July 20, 1948.

Sainte-Anne-de-Bellevue was established on a location once known and frequented by both the Algonquin and Haudenosaunee peoples. Situated between two important lakes (Lac des Deux-Montagnes and Lac Saint Louis) and near the confluence of two important rivers (the Saint Lawrence River and the Ottawa River) both nations recognized its natural strategic advantages and had names for the place. The oral records show that it was named "Tiotenactokte" by the Algonquin, which means "place of the last encampments", and the Haudenosaunee Mohawk people call it Skaná:wets, meaning "white waters, after the rapids".

In 1663, the Saint-Louis Mission was founded in the west end of Montreal Island at Pointe-Caron (site of the present-day Baie-d'Urfé yacht club), and was led by François-Saturnin Lascaris d'Urfé. At that time, the mission included the entire area from the tip of Montreal Island to Pointe-Claire, Île Perrot, Soulanges, Vaudreuil, and Île aux Tourtes.

In 1672, King Louis XIV granted fiefdoms bordering on Lake of Two Mountains and Lake Saint-Louis to Louis de Berthé, Lord of Chailly, and to his brother Gabriel, Lord of La Joubardière. One of these adjacent fiefdoms was called Bellevue, due to its good views to the east and west. In 1677, the Parish of Saint-Louis-du-Bout-de-l'Île, sometimes also called Saint-Louis-du-Haut-de-l'Île, was founded. Jean de Lalonde was the first church warden. One September 30, 1687, Lalonde and four other parishioners were killed in a skirmish with the Haudenosaunee. In 1703, the parish was closed and its registers moved to Lachine because of the constant threat from the Haudenosaunee.

Around 1712, René-Charles de Breslay (1658–1735), local parish priest from 1703 to 1719, got caught in a fierce snowstorm. He fell from his horse, broke his leg on the ice, and lost the horse. Breslay was allegedly saved through the intervention by Saint Anne, after which he built a chapel dedicated to her at the westernmost point of Montreal Island next to Fort Senneville and Tourtes Island (Île aux Tourtes). Two years later, the parish was reestablished and took the name Sainte-Anne-du-Bout-de-l'Île.

From the early 1800s the town became a place of literary pilgrimage after Thomas Moore the famous Irish composer wrote one of his most celebrated works Canadian Boat Song here.

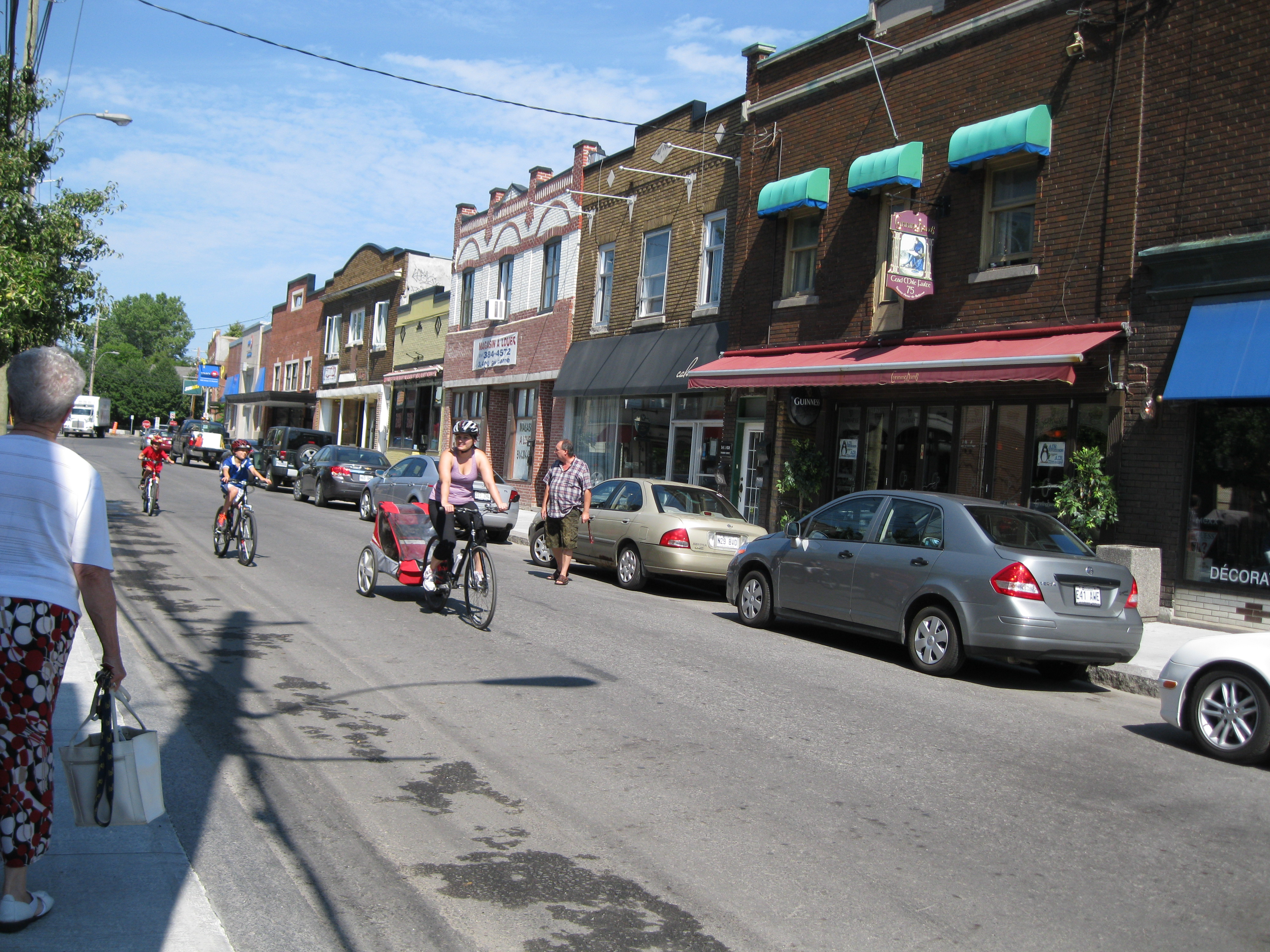
Sainte-Anne Street

In 1835, the local post office opened. In 1843, the Sainte-Anne Canal was completed, resulting in a large number of travellers and merchants passing through the village. Another impetus to its development came a few years later in 1854, when the Grand Trunk Railway was built through the area, followed by the Canadian Pacific Railway in 1887.

In 1845, the place was first incorporated as the Municipality of Bout-de-l'Isle. This was abolished two years later, but in 1855, it was reestablished as the Parish Municipality of Sainte-Anne-en-l'Isle-de-Montréal. In 1878, the main settlement was incorporated as a separate village municipality, and the parish municipality was renamed to Sainte-Anne-de-Bellevue that same year. The village municipality changed its status to town (ville) on January 12, 1895.

The early 20th century saw several developments in Sainte-Anne-de-Bellevue: the Macdonald College (affiliated to the McGill University) was established in 1907; the Federal Government built Ste. Anne's Veteran Hospital in 1917; the Galipeault Bridge was built in 1924 and doubled in 1964, linking Sainte-Anne-de-Bellevue with Île Perrot. One of Canada's earliest Garden City experiments was undertaken in Sainte-Anne-de-Bellevue by John James Harpell, an industrialist, who around 1918 developed the 10 acres (4.0 ha) neighbourhood of Gardenvale. The neighbourhood was granted its own post office in 1920.

In 1911, the parish municipality lost part of its territory when Baie-d'Urfé became a separate municipality. In 1964, the town of Sainte-Anne-de-Bellevue annexed the parish municipality.

On January 1, 2002, as part of the 2002–2006 municipal reorganization of Montreal, Sainte-Anne-de-Bellevue was merged into the city of Montreal and became part of the borough of L'Île-Bizard–Sainte-Geneviève–Sainte-Anne-de-Bellevue. However, after a change of government and a 2004 referendum, it was re-constituted as an independent city on January 1, 2006.

== Geography ==
=== Climate ===
Climate data for Sainte-Anne-de-Bellevue (1971–2000)
Month	Jan	Feb	Mar	Apr	May	Jun	Jul	Aug	Sep	Oct	Nov	Dec	Year
Record high °C (°F)	11.0 (51.8)	14.0 (57.2)	23.5 (74.3)	31.0 (87.8)	32.2 (90.0)	35.4 (95.7)	34.5 (94.1)	35.0 (95.0)	32.7 (90.9)	27.2 (81.0)	23.0 (73.4)	15.7 (60.3)	35.4 (95.7)
Mean daily maximum °C (°F)	−5.7 (21.7)	−4.0 (24.8)	1.9 (35.4)	10.7 (51.3)	18.6 (65.5)	23.4 (74.1)	26.2 (79.2)	24.8 (76.6)	19.5 (67.1)	12.4 (54.3)	5.1 (41.2)	−2.7 (27.1)	10.9 (51.5)
Daily mean °C (°F)	−10.4 (13.3)	−8.6 (16.5)	−2.6 (27.3)	5.9 (42.6)	13.2 (55.8)	18.1 (64.6)	21.0 (69.8)	19.8 (67.6)	14.6 (58.3)	8.1 (46.6)	1.7 (35.1)	−7.0 (19.4)	6.1 (43.1)
Mean daily minimum °C (°F)	−15.0 (5.0)	−13.2 (8.2)	−7.0 (19.4)	1.0 (33.8)	7.7 (45.9)	12.9 (55.2)	15.7 (60.3)	14.7 (58.5)	9.7 (49.5)	3.8 (38.8)	−1.8 (28.8)	−11.2 (11.8)	1.4 (34.6)
Record low °C (°F)	−36.0 (−32.8)	−35.0 (−31.0)	−28.3 (−18.9)	−13.3 (8.1)	−3.9 (25.0)	0 (32)	5.5 (41.9)	4.4 (39.9)	−3.5 (25.7)	−6.7 (19.9)	−17.8 (0.0)	−33.0 (−27.4)	−36.0 (−32.8)
Average precipitation mm (inches)	67.8 (2.67)	58.4 (2.30)	71.4 (2.81)	69.6 (2.74)	71.4 (2.81)	88.6 (3.49)	93.6 (3.69)	104.2 (4.10)	96.0 (3.78)	77.2 (3.04)	86.4 (3.40)	78.2 (3.08)	962.8 (37.91)
Average rainfall mm (inches)	23.1 (0.91)	20.0 (0.79)	39.9 (1.57)	59.7 (2.35)	71.2 (2.80)	88.6 (3.49)	93.6 (3.69)	104.2 (4.10)	96.0 (3.78)	76.3 (3.00)	64.2 (2.53)	31.0 (1.22)	767.8 (30.23)
Average snowfall cm (inches)	44.5 (17.5)	37.9 (14.9)	30.5 (12.0)	9.5 (3.7)	0.2 (0.1)	0 (0)	0 (0)	0 (0)	0 (0)	0.9 (0.4)	22.2 (8.7)	45.4 (17.9)	191.1 (75.2)
Average precipitation days (≥ 0.2 mm)	13.9	11.1	11.7	11.5	13.9	13.1	12.7	12.9	13.1	13.2	13.7	14.8	155.6
Average rainy days (≥ 0.2 mm)	3.0	2.8	6.3	10.0	13.9	13.1	12.7	12.9	13.1	12.9	10.0	4.1	114.8
Average snowy days (≥ 0.2 cm)	11.2	8.9	6.1	1.9	0.05	0	0	0	0	0.43	4.6	11.3	44.48
Mean monthly sunshine hours	102.4	126.8	155.8	181.2	229.5	245.7	277.7	238.3	172.0	131.6	83.0	80.7	2,024.7
Source: Environment Canada

== Demographics ==
Historical populations
Year	Pop.	±%
1881	1,163	—
1891	1,171	+0.7%
1901	1,343	+14.7%
1911	1,416	+5.4%
1921	2,212	+56.2%
1931	2,417	+9.3%
1941	3,006	+24.4%
1951	3,342	+11.2%
1956	3,647	+9.1%
1961	4,044	+10.9%
1966	5,334	+31.9%
1971	4,976	−6.7%
1976	3,738	−24.9%
1981	3,981	+6.5%
1986	4,140	+4.0%
1991	4,030	−2.7%
1996	4,700	+16.6%
2001	5,062	+7.7%
2006	5,197	+2.7%
2011	5,073	−2.4%
2016	4,958	−2.3%
2021	5,027	+1.4%
Source: Statistics Canada

In the 2021 Census of Population conducted by Statistics Canada, Sainte-Anne-de-Bellevue had a population of 5,027 living in 2,108 of its 2,304 total private dwellings, a change of 1.4% from its 2016 population of 4,958. With a land area of 10.46 km^{2} (4.04 sq mi), it had a population density of 480.6/km^{2} (1,244.7/sq mi) in 2021.

Canada census – Sainte-Anne-de-Bellevue community profile

	2021	2016
Population	5,027 (+1.4% from 2016)	4,958 (-2.3% from 2011)
Land area	10.46 km^{2} (4.04 sq mi)	10.48 km^{2} (4.05 sq mi)
Population density	480.8/km^{2} (1,245/sq mi)	473.0/km^{2} (1,225/sq mi)
Median age	46.0 (M: 44.8, F: 48.0)	44.5 (M: 46.0, F: 42.9)
Private dwellings	2,304 (total)	2,195 (total)
Median household income	$81,000	$67,200

References: 2021 2016

Home Language (2021)
Language	Population	Percentage (%)
English	2,805	60%
French	1,125	24%
Other	390	8%

Mother Tongue (2021)
Language	Population	Percentage (%)
English	1,990	43%
French	1,290	28%
Other	1,005	22%

Visible Minorities (2021)
Ethnicity	Population	Percentage (%)
Not a visible minority	3,620	78.1%
Visible minorities	1,010	21.8%

== Government ==
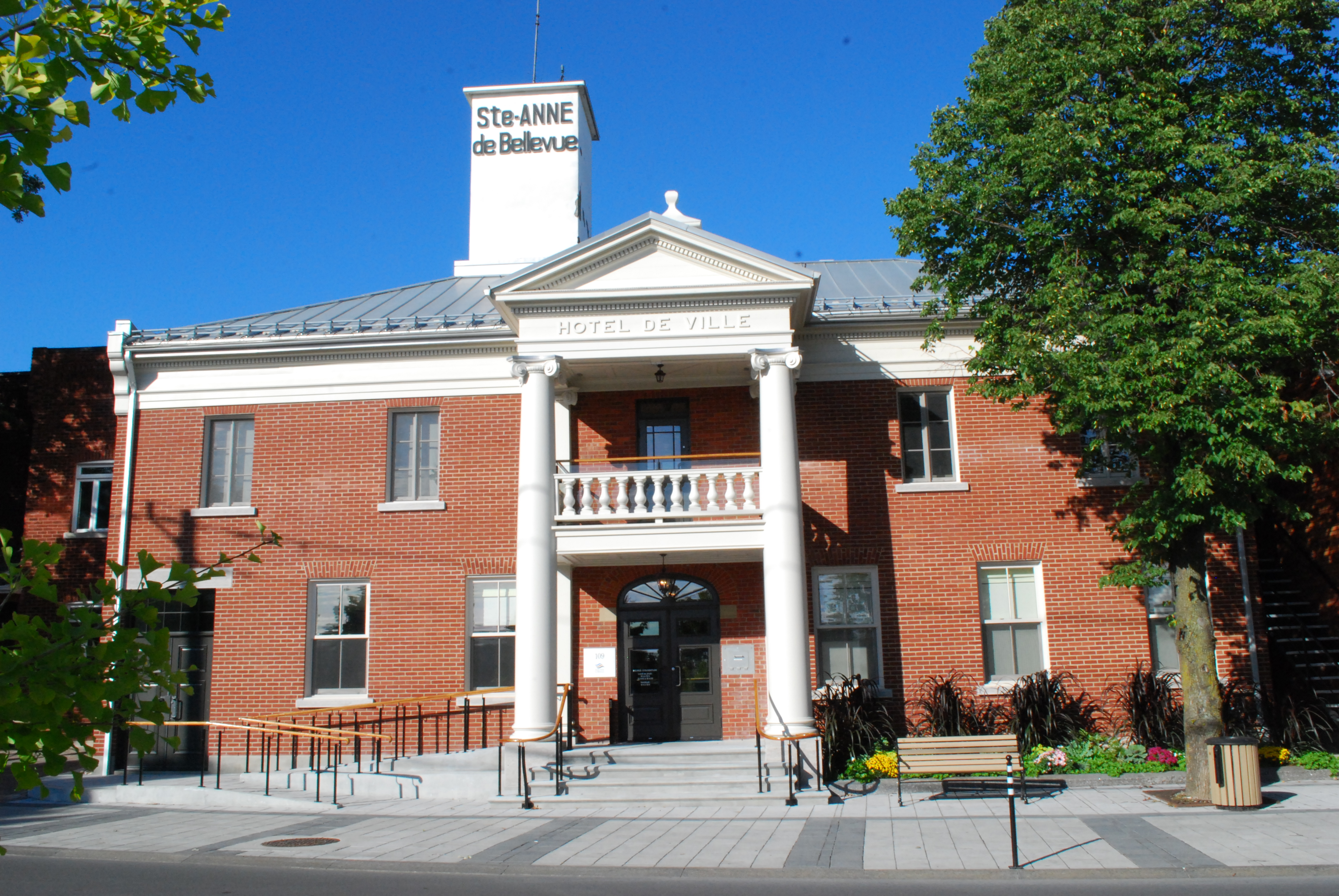
City Hall

The current mayor of Saint-Anne-de-Bellevue is Michel Boudreault.

There are six city councillors:

1. Ryan Young (District 1)
2. Jeffrey Smallwood (District 2)
3. Dan Boyer (District 3)
4. Tom Broad (District 4)
5. Yvan Labelle (District 5)
6. Denis Gignac (District 6)

=== List of mayors ===
The mayors of Sainte-Anne-de-Bellevue have been:

- Jules Tremblay, 1878–1879
- Thomas Grenier, 1880–1884, 1885–1886
- Antoine St-Denis, 1881–1883
- D. Lebeau, 1887
- L. Michaud, 1888–1897
- M. C. Bezner, 1898–1899, 1901–1905, 1909–10, 1915–1916
- L.N.F. Cypihot, 1900, 1921–1922
- J.A. Aumais, 1906
- Guis. Daoust, 1906, 1917–1920
- Bruno Lalonde, 1907–1908, 1913–1914
- J.S. Vallée, 1911–1912
- L.J. Boileau, 1923–1931, 1933–1934
- A.R. Demers, 1932, 1935–1938
- E.E. Deslauriers, 1939–1951
- Philippe Godin, 1951–1965
- J.L. Paquin, 1965–1973
- Alphonse Trudeau, 1973–1978
- Marcel Marleau, 1978–1984
- René Martin, 1984–1994
- Bill Tierney, 1994–2001, 2005–2009
- Francis Deroo, 2009–2013
- Paola Hawa, 2013–2025
- Michel Boudreault, 2025–present

== Infrastructure ==
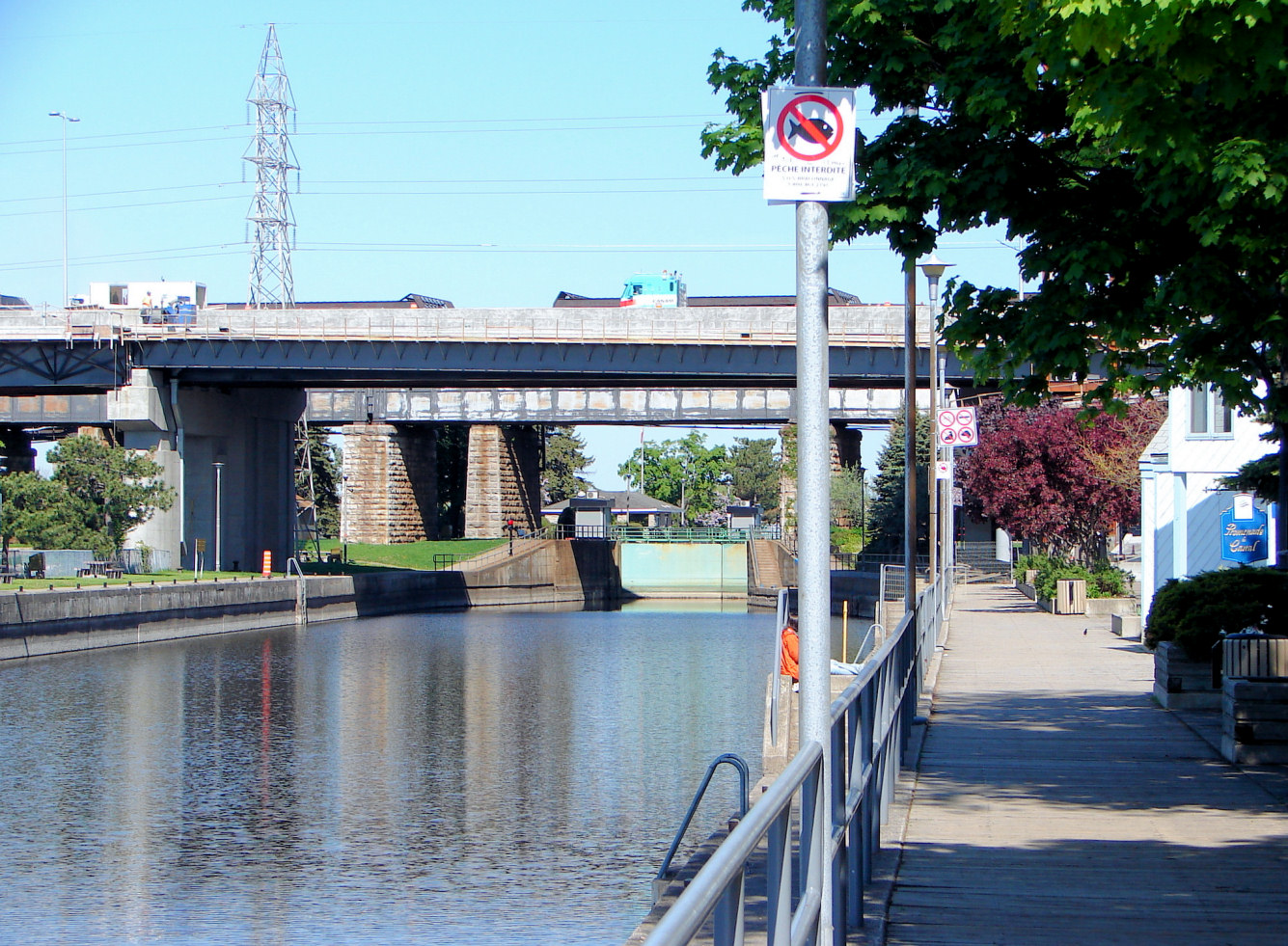
The Sainte-Anne-de-Bellevue Canal and boardwalk. Linking Lake Saint-Louis and Lake of Two Mountains at the mouth of the Ottawa River, the canal was an integral part of the Montreal-Ottawa-Kingston inland shipping route from its opening in 1843. Today, it is used essentially for pleasure boating.

Sainte-Anne-de-Bellevue is traversed by Autoroute 40 (the Trans-Canada Highway) and Autoroute 20, which crosses the Ottawa River over the Galipeault Bridge linking it to Île Perrot.

For public transit, the town is served by the Sainte-Anne-de-Bellevue commuter train station on the Vaudreuil-Hudson Line. It also covered by the bus network of the Société de transport de Montréal.

Anse-à-l'Orme station, in Sainte-Anne-de-Bellevue, is the westernmost terminus for the Réseau express métropolitain rapid transit system on the island of Montreal. The West Island branch opened on 18 May 2026.

== Education ==
The Centre de services scolaire Marguerite-Bourgeoys operates Francophone public schools, but were previously operated by the Commission scolaire Marguerite-Bourgeoys until June 15, 2020. The change was a result of a law passed by the Quebec government that changed the school board system from denominational to linguistic. It operates the École primaire du Bout-de-l'Isle.

The Lester B. Pearson School Board (LBPSB) operates Anglophone public schools in the area. It operates Macdonald High School.

The zoned elementary school is Dorset Elementary School in Baie-D'Urfé.

== See also ==
- Ecomuseum Zoo
- List of anglophone communities in Quebec
- List of former boroughs
- Montreal Merger
- Morgan Arboretum
- Municipal reorganization in Quebec
