= Ecomuseum Zoo =

Zoo in Saine-Anne-de-Bellevue, Canada

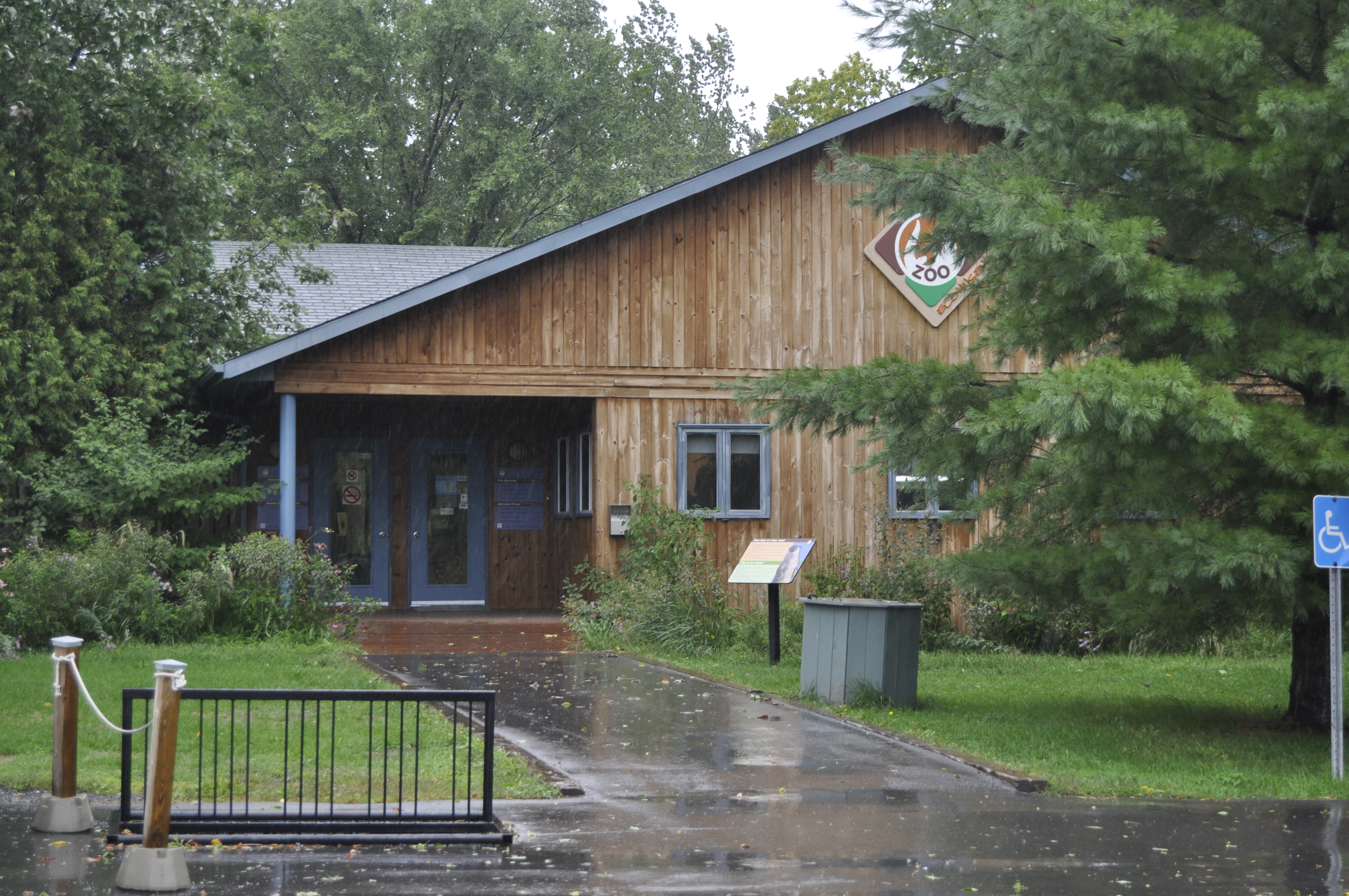
- Ecomuseum Zoo
- Interactive map of Ecomuseum Zoo
- Date opened: 1988
- Location: Sainte-Anne-de-Bellevue, Quebec, Canada
- Land area: 11.3 hectares (28 acres)
- No. of species: 115
- Memberships: CAZA
- Website: www.ecomuseum.ca

The Ecomuseum Zoo (French: Zoo Ecomuseum) is a Canadian ecomuseum and zoological park in Sainte-Anne-de-Bellevue, Quebec and was founded in 1988. It is accredited by the Canadian Association of Zoos and Aquariums (CAZA). It occupies 11.3 hectares (28 acres) of land on the western tip of the Island of Montreal.

The Ecomuseum is home to 115 different species of animal native to the Saint Lawrence Valley in southwestern Quebec. The Ecomuseum is operated by the Saint-Lawrence Valley Natural History Society and opened in 1988.

== History ==
Dr. John Roger Bider founded the St. Lawrence Valley Natural History Society in 1981 to help educate children about the environment. In 1988, the society opened the Ecomuseum on 11.3 hectares (28 acres) of land that had originally been wetland, but had then been used in the 1960s as landfill.

The first education programs on the site were offered in 1989. The first building on the site, for administration and education, was opened in 1992. Ecomuseum opened in the winter for the first time in 1996.

== Gallery ==
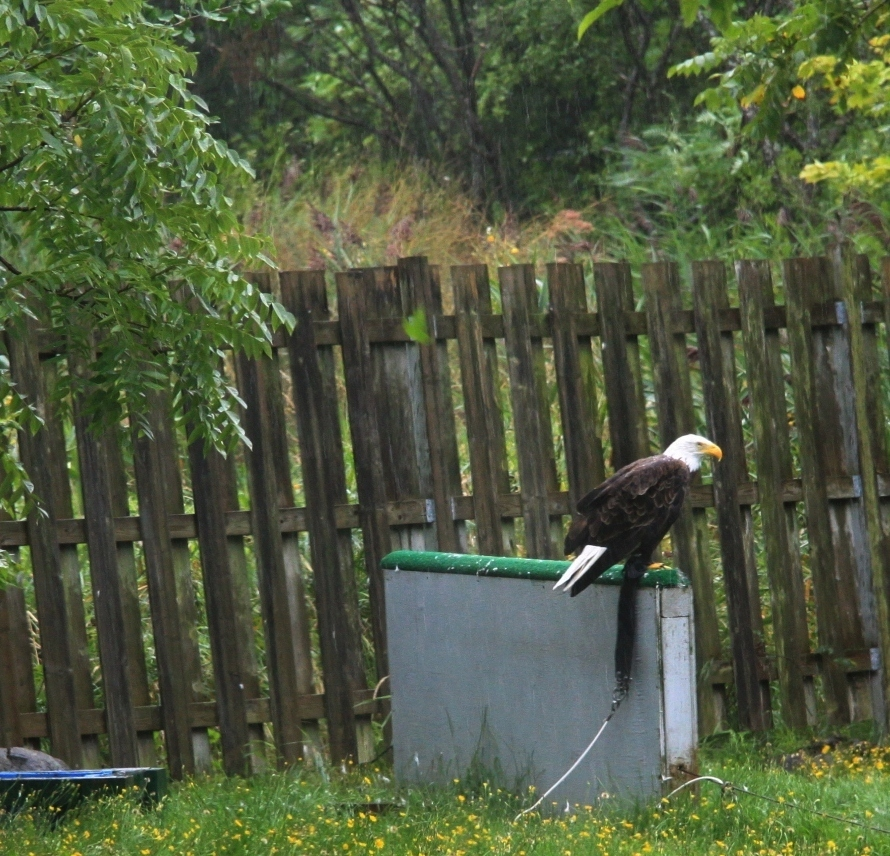

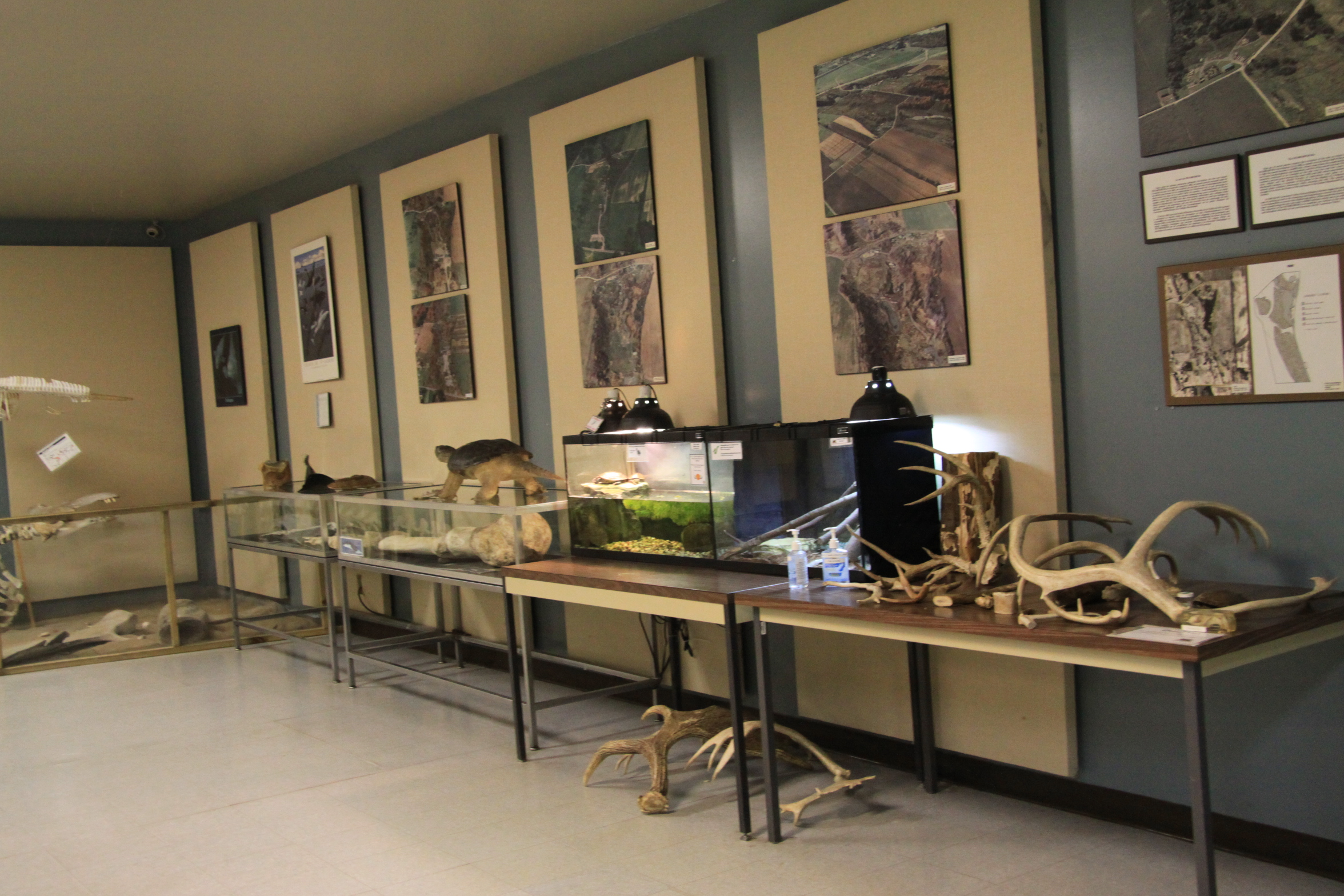

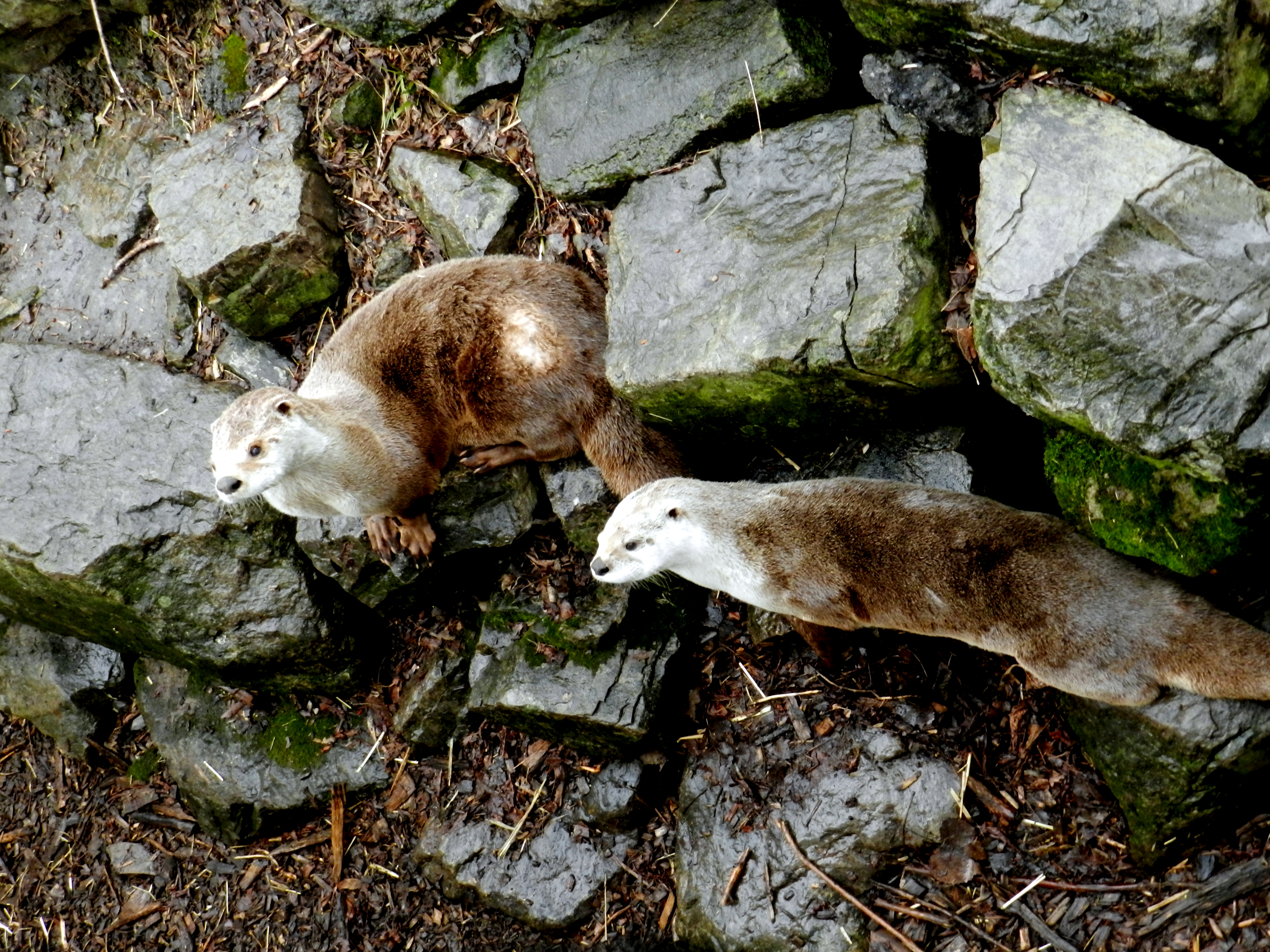

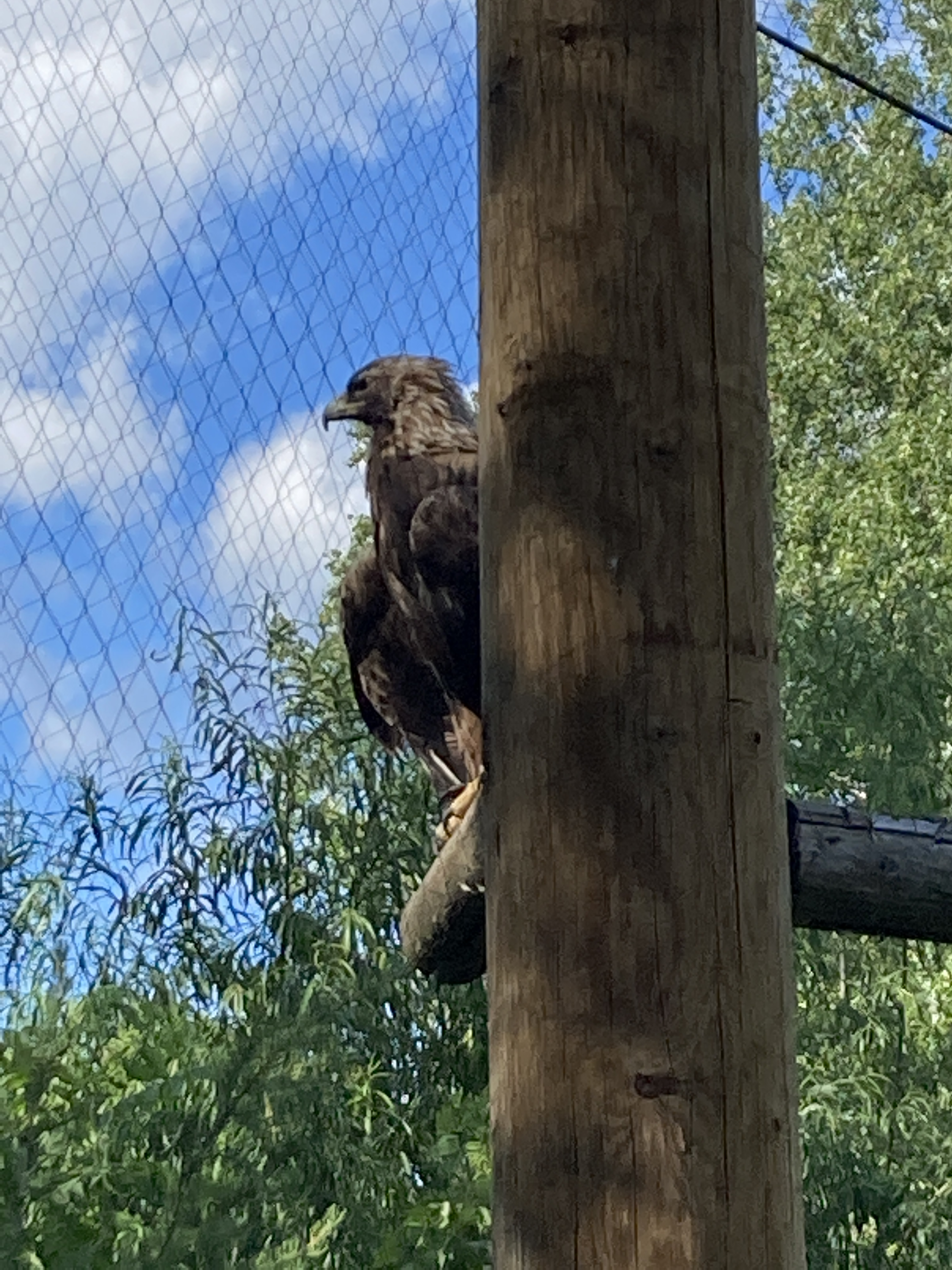

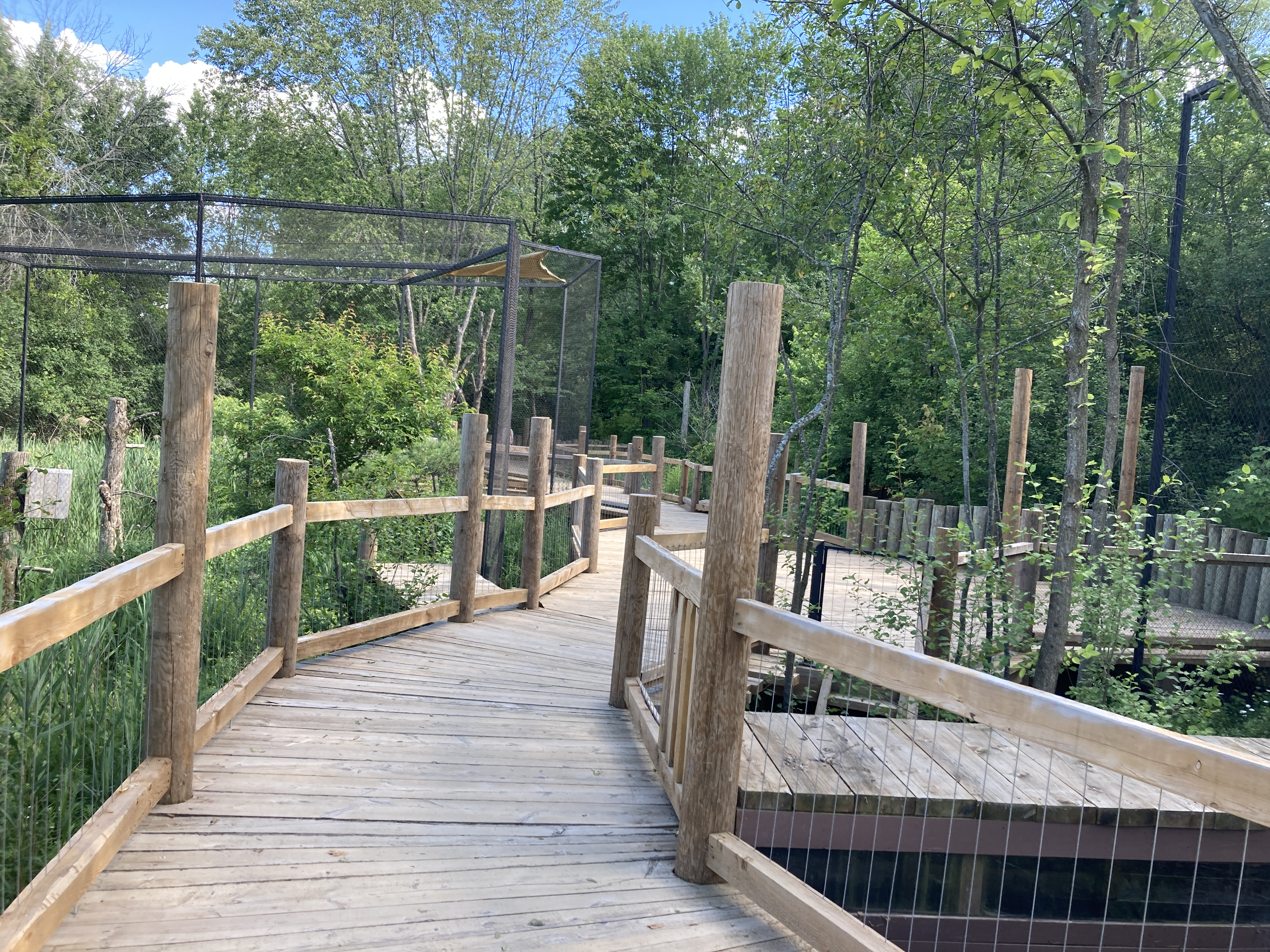

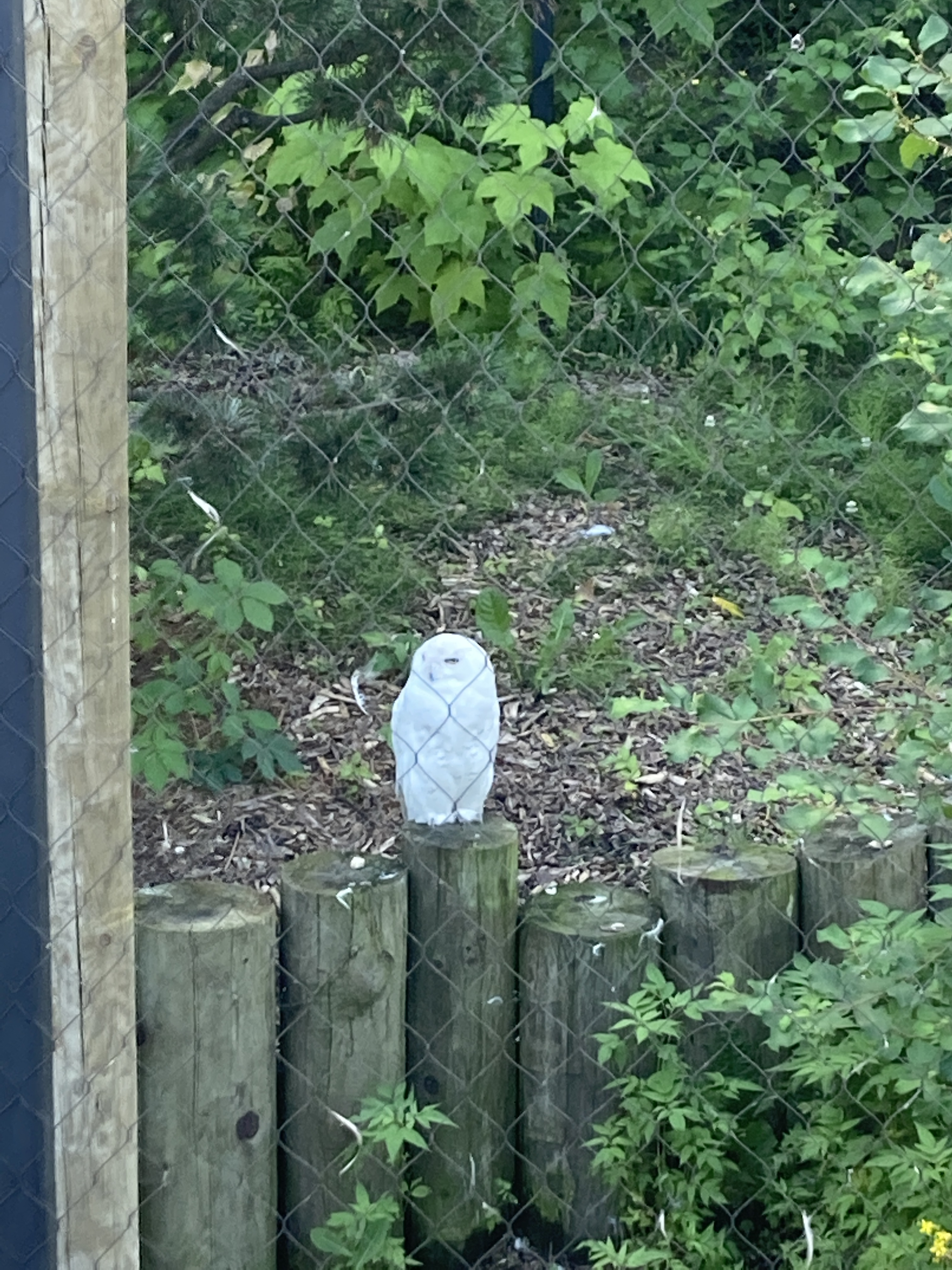
