= Fort Senneville =

Fort in Senneville, Quebec, Canada

- Part of Montreal's outlying forts
- Senneville, Quebec, Canada
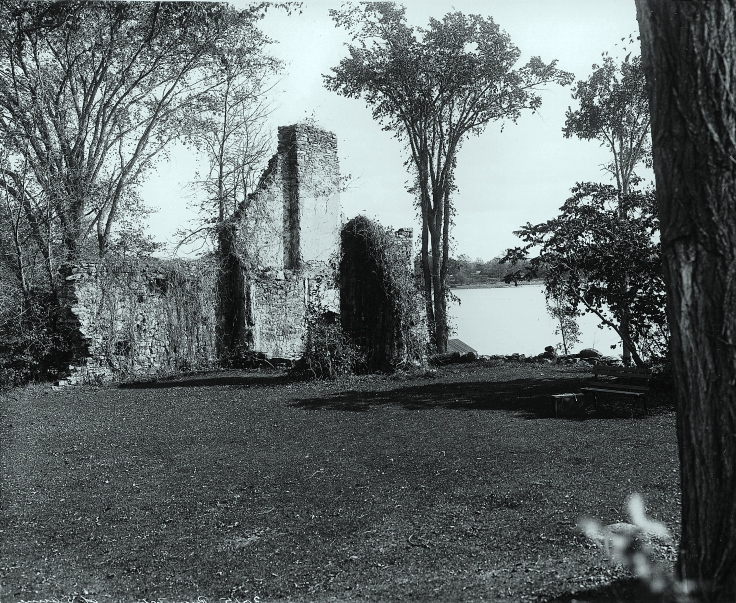
- Fort Senneville in 1895

Site information
- Type: castle-like fort
- Controlled by: New France
- Condition: Some ruins remain

Location
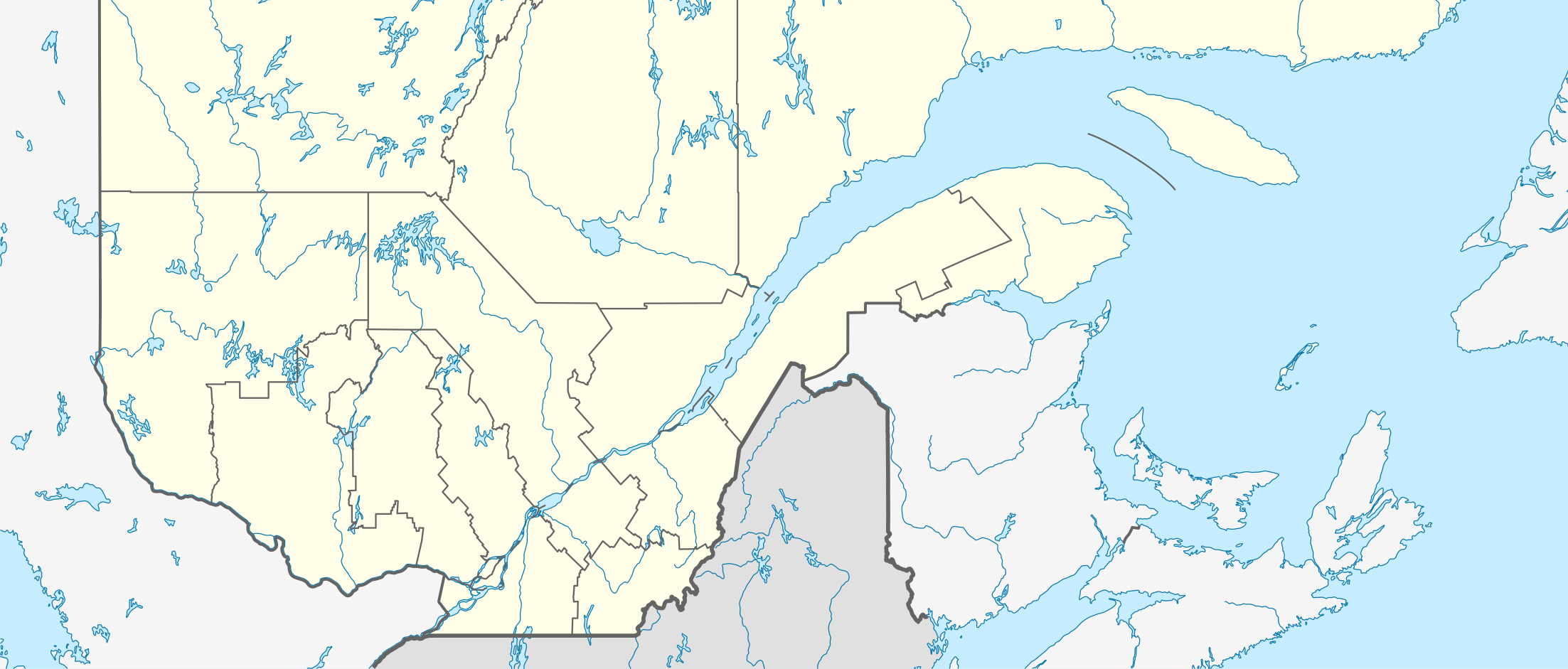
- Coordinates: 45.42585°N 73.974402°W

Site history
- Built: 1671
- Built by: Séminaire de Saint-Sulpice
- In use: 1671-1763
- Materials: Stone, wood
- Demolished: 1776
- Battles/wars: Iroquois incursions American Revolution

Fort Senneville is one of the outlying forts of Montreal, Quebec, Canada, built by the Canadiens of New France near the Sainte-Anne-de-Bellevue in 1671. The property was part of a fief ceded to Dugué de Boisbriant in 1672 by the Sulpicians. A large stone windmill, which doubled as a watch tower, was built on a hill by late 1686 and featuring machicolation and other castle-like features. The fort was burned down by Iroquois in 1691, with only the mill itself left standing.

Governor-General Frontenac ordered the construction of a second, more imposing fort in 1692. It was rebuilt in 1702–1703 to protect the nearby fur trading post. With extensive cannons and swiveling wall guns, it was the "most substantial castle-like fort" near Montreal. It was eventually destroyed in 1776 by Benedict Arnold, under American military control, but the ruins have been maintained since then. In 2003, it was classified as a historic site.

== Background ==
Thanks to the tireless work of French explorers, the colony of New France covered the largest area, but it was numerically inferior to the neighbouring New England. Consequently, a number of Ingénieurs du Roi ("King's Engineers") were appointed to make the colony the best fortified in North America:

In the new colonies, the Spanish start by building a church, the English a tavern, and the French a fort.

Quebec served as the only fortified city in the Americas, centred on the Citadelle of Quebec. An unusual feature of Montreal's defence was a string of 30 outlying forts to protect against the constant Iroquois threat to the expansion of French settlements. The majority of these were simple stockades, but as artillery was not as developed as on the battlefields of Europe, some of these were built like the fortified manor houses of France. Roughly four of these were substantial stone forts which served as defensive residences, sometimes considered "true castles", as well as imposing structures to prevent Iroquois incursions. Initially, Fort Senneville was a French stockade fort, built in 1671 about half a mile above the Sainte-Anne rapids. The property was part of a fief ceded to Dugué de Boisbriant in 1672 by the Society of Saint-Sulpice, and subsequently relinquished in payment of a debt to two of the most significant figures in New France's history: Jacques Le Ber and Charles Le Moyne, who used the site as a fur-trading post.

In 1679, Jacques Le Ber, who had obtained the fief, renamed it to Senneville after Senneville-sur-Fécamp, his hometown in France. A large stone windmill was built on a hill by late 1686, doubling as a watch tower over the Ottawa River, the Lake of Two Mountains, and the mouth of the Des Prairies River. This windmill was like no other in New France (although a similar fortified windmill was later built in Quebec), with thick walls, square loopholes for muskets, with machicolation at the top for pouring lethally hot liquids and rocks onto attackers.

In October 1687, the nearby Fort Sainte-Anne and the Senneville mill were attacked by Iroquois, and although several settlers were killed, the attackers were repulsed. A second attack was more successful in 1691, and the fort was burned down. Only the mill itself was left standing.

== Second fort ==
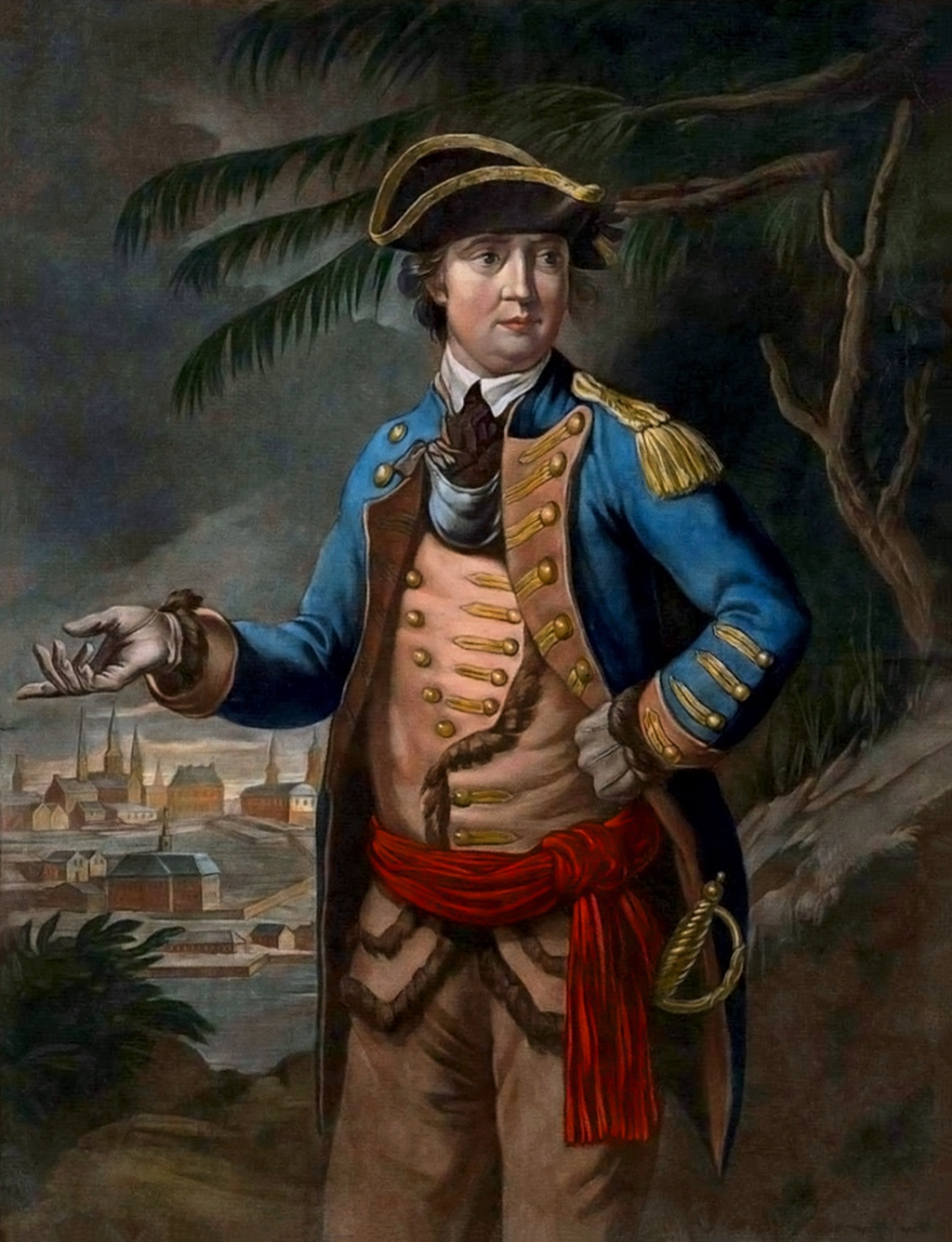
Colonel Benedict Arnold in 1776, the year he destroyed the fort.

The attack had come shortly after the 1690 Battle of Quebec, and an enraged Governor-General Frontenac ordered the construction of a second, more imposing fort. The fort was rebuilt in 1692 with thick stone walls and corner tower bastions. With extensive cannons and swivel wall guns, it was the "most substantial castle-like fort" near Montreal.

It was never attacked again. The windmill was rebuilt in 1700, and was probably still in use until the 1780s. In 1703, Jacques Le Ber de Senneville constructed a large stone house and fort in order to improve and protect his fur trading operations, and the local seigneural manor house was built in 1706. However, after the fall of New France in 1763, it was not used by the British as a military post. In 1776, Fort Senneville was destroyed during the American Revolutionary War by Continental Army troops under Benedict Arnold, in military manoeuvres associated with the Battle of the Cedars.

In 1865, the property was purchased as a summer residence by John Joseph Caldwell Abbott, former prime minister of Canada and Mayor of Montreal. Sir Edward Seaborne Clouston purchased the domain from Abbott's estate in 1898.

== The site today ==
The site is on private property and therefore inaccessible. The 10-acre (4 ha) area is important part to Montreal's cultural and natural heritage for several reasons.

In November 2003, Quebec recognized its historical significance by classifying it a "Site historique". The Ministry of Culture and Communications has commissioned studies on the historical ownership of the fort, and funded archaeological research and repairs to consolidate the structure of the ruins, recognizing "the exceptional historic and prehistoric archaeological potential of the ruin and its surroundings".

The site's value today includes its ecological and environmental significance, and its shoreline, which is in a semi-natural state, is part of the habitat for the rare map turtle. It is situated between the Lake of Two Mountains and the Senneville Forest ecoterritory, as described in Montreal's Natural Spaces Policy. Therefore, it could be considered part of the wildlife corridor (lien faunique) between the lake and the forest.
