= Morgan Arboretum =

Forested reserve in Sainte-Anne-de-Bellevue, Quebec, Canada

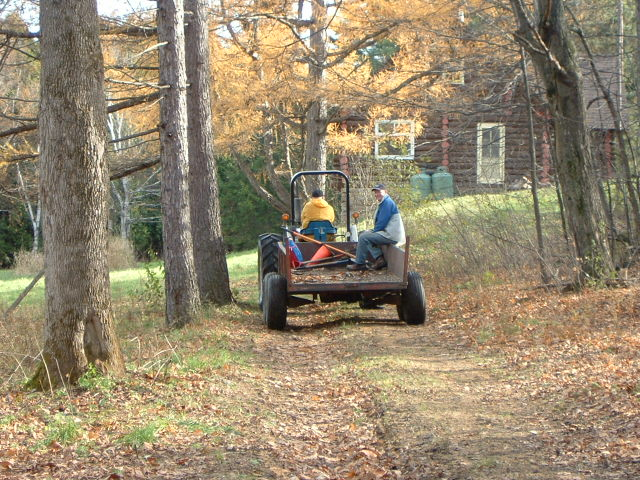
- An autumn day at the Morgan Arboretum
- Interactive map of Morgan Arboretum
- Type: Arboretum
- Location: Sainte-Anne-de-Bellevue, Quebec, Canada
- Coordinates: 45°25′50.1″N 73°57′8.2″W
- Area: 245 hectares (610 acres)
- Operator: McGill University
- Open: 1945

The Morgan Arboretum is a 245-hectare (610-acre) forested reserve, on the McGill University Macdonald Campus in Sainte-Anne-de-Bellevue, on the western tip of the Island of Montreal, Quebec, Canada. It is a mixed-use woodland and recreational area, with an extensive network of walking, skiing and snowshoeing trails totaling some 25 km (16 mi).

== History ==
McGill University acquired the property in 1945. Through the work of Robert Watson and his son John, the arboretum has remained a managed mixed-used area for conservation, academic study, recreation and forestry management.

== Flora and fauna ==
The Morgan Arboretum contains 40 native species of tree, including the American beech, sugar maple, butternut, bitternut hickory, American elm and black cherry. It is also home to more than 170 species of migratory and overwintering birds, 15 species of reptiles or amphibians and 30 species of mammals.

== Management ==
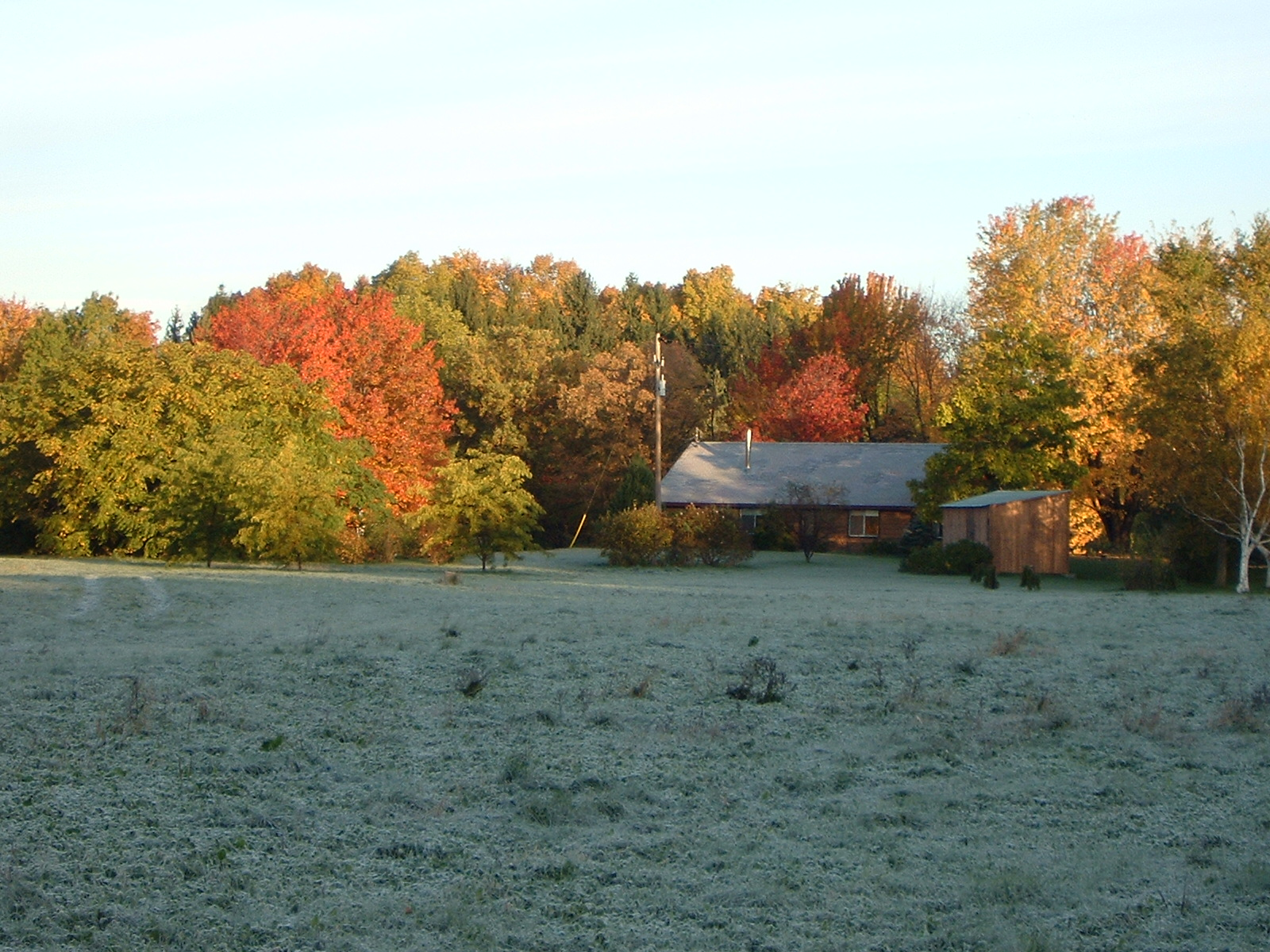
The Conservation Centre

The Morgan Arboretum is supported by visitor admission fees, McGill University and a charity, the Morgan Arboretum Association. An active member's organisation, the Friends of the Morgan Arboretum, had 2000 members in 2010.
