= Pierrefonds-Roxboro =

- Borough of Montreal
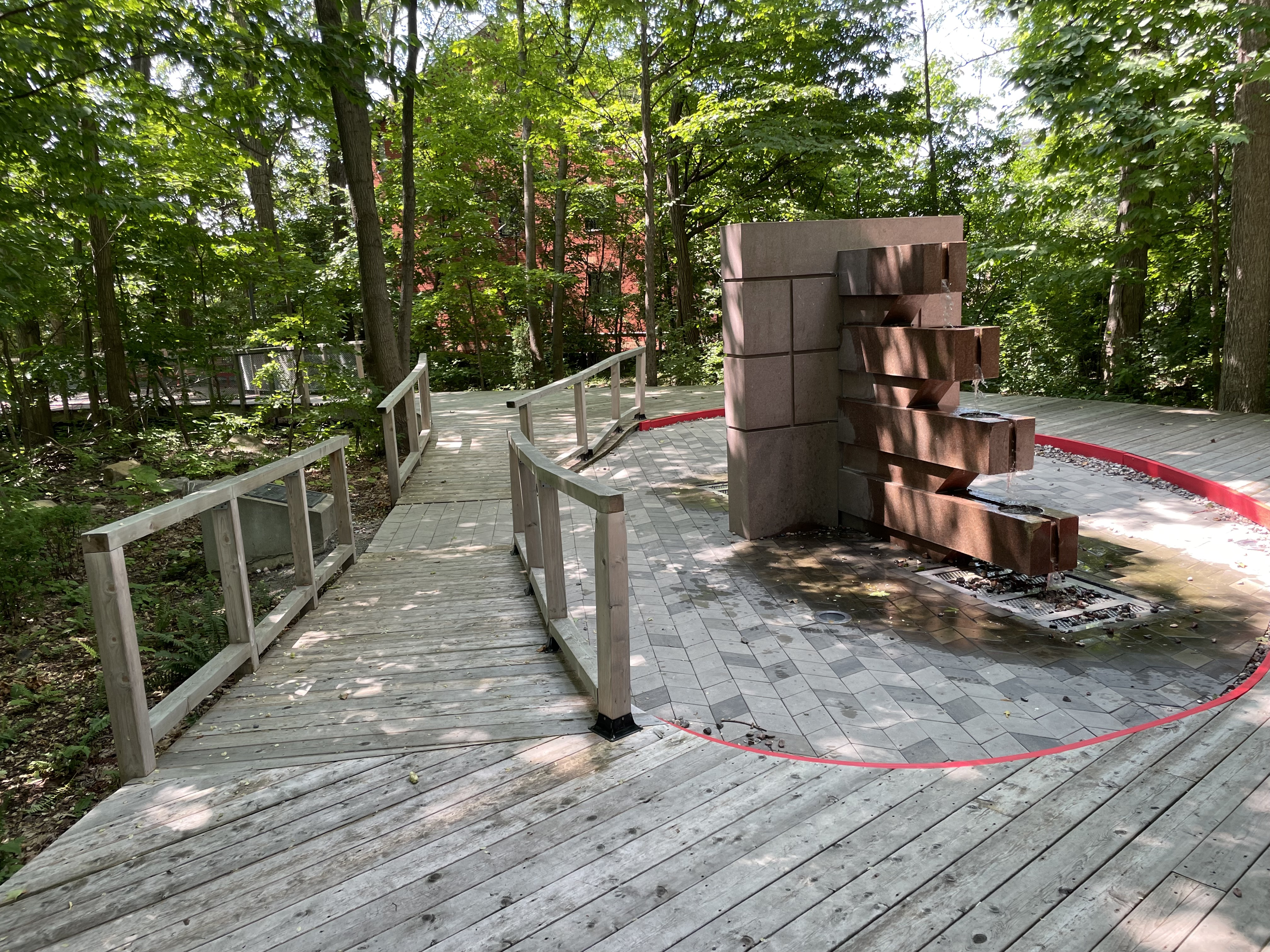
- Parc du Millénaire

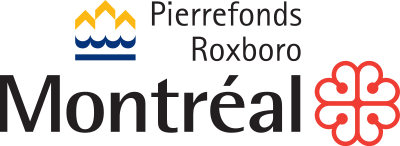

- Location of Pierrefonds-Roxboro on Island of Montreal. (Gray areas indicate demerged municipalities).
- Coordinates: 45°30′N 73°48′W
- Country: Canada
- Province: Quebec
- Region: Montréal
- Established: January 1, 2006
- Electoral Districts Federal: Pierrefonds—Dollard; Lac-Saint-Louis
- Provincial: Nelligan; Robert-Baldwin

Government
  - Type: Borough
  - Mayor: Dimitrios (Jim) Beis (EM)
  - Federal MP(s): Sameer Zuberi (LPC); Francis Scarpaleggia (LPC)
  - Quebec MNA(s): Brigitte Garceau (PLQ); Monsef Derraji (PLQ)

Area
  - Land: 27.1 km^{2} (10.5 sq mi)

Population (2016)
  - Total: 69,297
  - Density: 2,560.9/km^{2} (6,633/sq mi)
  - Dwellings: 25,335
- Time zone: UTC-5 (EST)
  - Summer (DST): UTC-4 (EDT)
- Postal code(s): H8Y, H8Z, H9H, H9K
- Area codes: (514) and (438)
- Access Routes: A-13
- Website: Borough website

Pierrefonds-Roxboro (French pronunciation: [pjɛʁfɔ̃ ʁɔksbɔʁo]) is a borough of the city of Montreal. It was created January 1, 2006, following the demerger of parts of the city.

== Geography ==
It is composed of the former municipalities of Pierrefonds and Roxboro, spanning the northern part of the West Island. Besides its land borders with the borough of L'Île-Bizard–Sainte-Geneviève, as well as the boroughs of Saint-Laurent and Ahuntsic-Cartierville to the east, it borders the municipalities of Senneville, Sainte-Anne-de-Bellevue, Kirkland, and Dollard-des-Ormeaux.

The borough has an area of 27.1 km^{2} (10½ sq. mi.) and a population of 69,297.

Pierrefonds contains Cap-Saint-Jacques Nature Park, the largest nature park in the City of Montreal. It is also home to several English elementary schools (St. Anthony School, St. Charles School, Greendale, Terry Fox School, Kingsdale Academy) as well as the public English high school, Pierrefonds Community High School. There are two French private schools, Collège Charlemagne and Collège Beaubois, as well as the public French high school, École secondaire de l'Altitude (formerly Riverdale High School). There is also a large library.

Roxboro has two nature parks known as Roxboro Island and Roxboro Woods, three elementary schools (Lalande, public French; Charles-Perrault, private French; and Socrates-Desmosthène, private French, with "advanced learning" in English and Greek) as well as a small library. It also had a Federal Canada Post office, which still operates as a distribution centre. The former headquarters of the Roxboro Volunteer Fire Brigade, now Station 58 of the Service de sécurité incendie de Montréal, houses a single engine company. The adjacent former Roxboro Town Hall houses the Fire Prevention officers for Fire Division 11, and also serves as a borough point of service for the Roxboro area.

== Politics ==
District	Position	Name	Party
—	Borough mayor City councillor	Dimitrios (Jim) Beis	Ensemble Montréal
Bois-de-Liesse	City councillor	Benoit Langevin	Ensemble Montréal
Bois-de-Liesse	Borough councillor	Louise Leroux	Ensemble Montréal
Cap-Saint-Jacques	City councillor	Catherine Clément-Talbot	Ensemble Montréal
Cap-Saint-Jacques	Borough councillor	Chahi (Sharkie) Tarakjian	Ensemble Montréal

Federally, it is part of the ridings of Lac-Saint-Louis and Pierrefonds-Dollard, provincially, it's part of Nelligan and Robert-Baldwin.

== Transportation ==
The borough is served by the Sunnybrooke and Pierrefonds-Roxboro stations on the Réseau express métropolitain. Major thoroughfares include Saint Charles Boulevard, Saint Jean Boulevard, Des Sources Boulevard, as well as Gouin, and Pierrefonds Boulevards. Autoroute 13 also crosses the easternmost part of the borough.

== Demographics ==
Historical populations
Year	Pop.	±%
1966	35,854	—
1971	40,645	+13.4%
1976	42,508	+4.6%
1981	44,682	+5.1%
1986	45,743	+2.4%
1991	54,614	+19.4%
1996	58,936	+7.9%
2001	60,605	+2.8%
2006	65,041	+7.3%
2011	68,410	+5.2%
2016	69,297	+1.3%

According to the Office québécois de la langue française, the borough of Pierrefonds-Roxboro has been officially recognized as a bilingual municipality since 2005-12-07. It is the sole borough in the City of Montreal to be bilingual.

Home language (2016)
Language	Population	Percentage (%)
French	18,140	30%
English	27,580	45%
Other languages	15,225	25%

Mother Tongue (2016)
Language	Population	Percentage (%)
French	17,765	28%
English	19,995	31%
Other languages	26,875	42%

Visible Minorities (2016)
Ethnicity	Population	Percentage (%)
Not a visible minority	39,165	56.9%
Visible minorities	29,670	43.1%

== Education ==
The Centre de services scolaire Marguerite-Bourgeoys operates Francophone public schools, but were previously operated by the Commission scolaire Marguerite-Bourgeoys until June 15, 2020. The change was a result of a law passed by the Quebec government that changed the school board system from denominational to linguistic.

Specialized schools:

- École secondaire Rose-Virginie-Pelletier (RVP)

High schools:

- École secondaire de l'Altitude

Primary schools:

- du Grand-Chêne
- Harfang-des-Neiges
- Lalande
- Murielle-Dumont
- Perce-Neige
- Saint-Gérard
- Charles-Perrault

The Lester B. Pearson School Board (LBPSB) operates Anglophone public schools.

Vocational Education:

- West Island Career Centre

High schools:

- Pierrefonds Community High School

Elementary Schools:

- Beechwood Elementary School
- Greendale Elementary School
- St. Anthony Elementary School
- St. Charles Elementary School
- Terry Fox Elementary School
- Kingsdale Academy
- In addition, Westpark Elementary, Sunshine Academy Elementary and Wilder-Penfield Elementary in Dollard-des-Ormeaux and Margaret Manson Elementary School in Kirkland serve portions of the borough.

=== Public libraries ===
The Montreal Public Libraries Network operates the Pierrefonds Branch (13 555, boulevard Pierrefonds) and the William G. Boll Branch (110, rue Cartier) in the borough.

== See also ==
- Boroughs of Montreal
- Districts of Montreal
- Municipal reorganization in Quebec
