= Pointe-Claire =

Suburban municipality of Montreal, Canada

- City
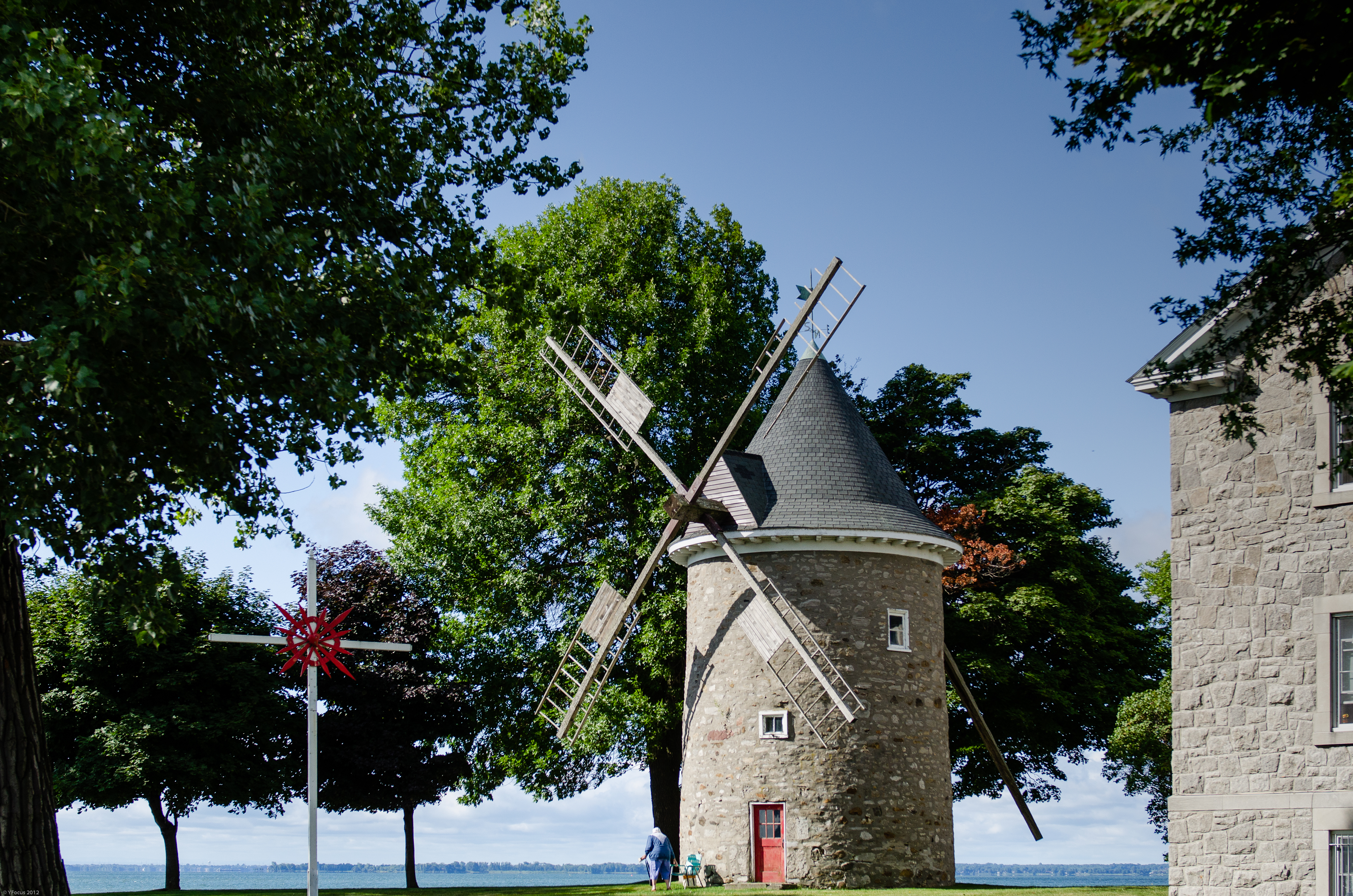
- Pointe-Claire Windmill

- Location of Pointe-Claire on Montreal Island

- Location in southern Quebec
- Coordinates: 45°27′N 73°49′W
- Country: Canada
- Province: Quebec
- Region: Montréal
- RCM: None
- Settled: 1698
- Village: 2 September 1854
- Ville: 3 March 1911
- Merged: 1 January 2002
- Reconstituted: 1 January 2006
- Named for: Point of land with a clear view over Lake Saint-Louis

Government
  - Mayor: John Belvedere
  - Federal riding: Lac-Saint-Louis
  - Prov. riding: Jacques-Cartier

Area
  - Total: 34.66 km^{2} (13.38 sq mi)
  - Land: 18.91 km^{2} (7.30 sq mi)

Population (2021)
  - Total: 33,488
  - Density: 1,770.9/km^{2} (4,587/sq mi)
  - Pop 2016-2021: ▲6.7%
  - Dwellings: 13,823
- Time zone: UTC−5 (EST)
  - Summer (DST): UTC−4 (EDT)
- Postal code(s): H9R, H9S
- Area codes: 514 and 438
- Highways A-20: A-40 (TCH)
- Website: www.pointe-claire.ca

Pointe-Claire (/pɔɪnt ˈklɛər/, French pronunciation: [pwɛ̃t klɛʁ]) is a Quebec local municipality within the urban agglomeration of Montreal on the Island of Montreal in Canada. It is entirely developed, and land use includes residential, light manufacturing, and retail. As of the 2021 census the population was 33,488.

== Toponymy ==
The toponym refers to the peninsula, or point, where the windmill, convent, and the Saint-Joachim de Pointe-Claire Church are sited. The point extends into Lac Saint-Louis and has a clear view of its surroundings.

== History ==
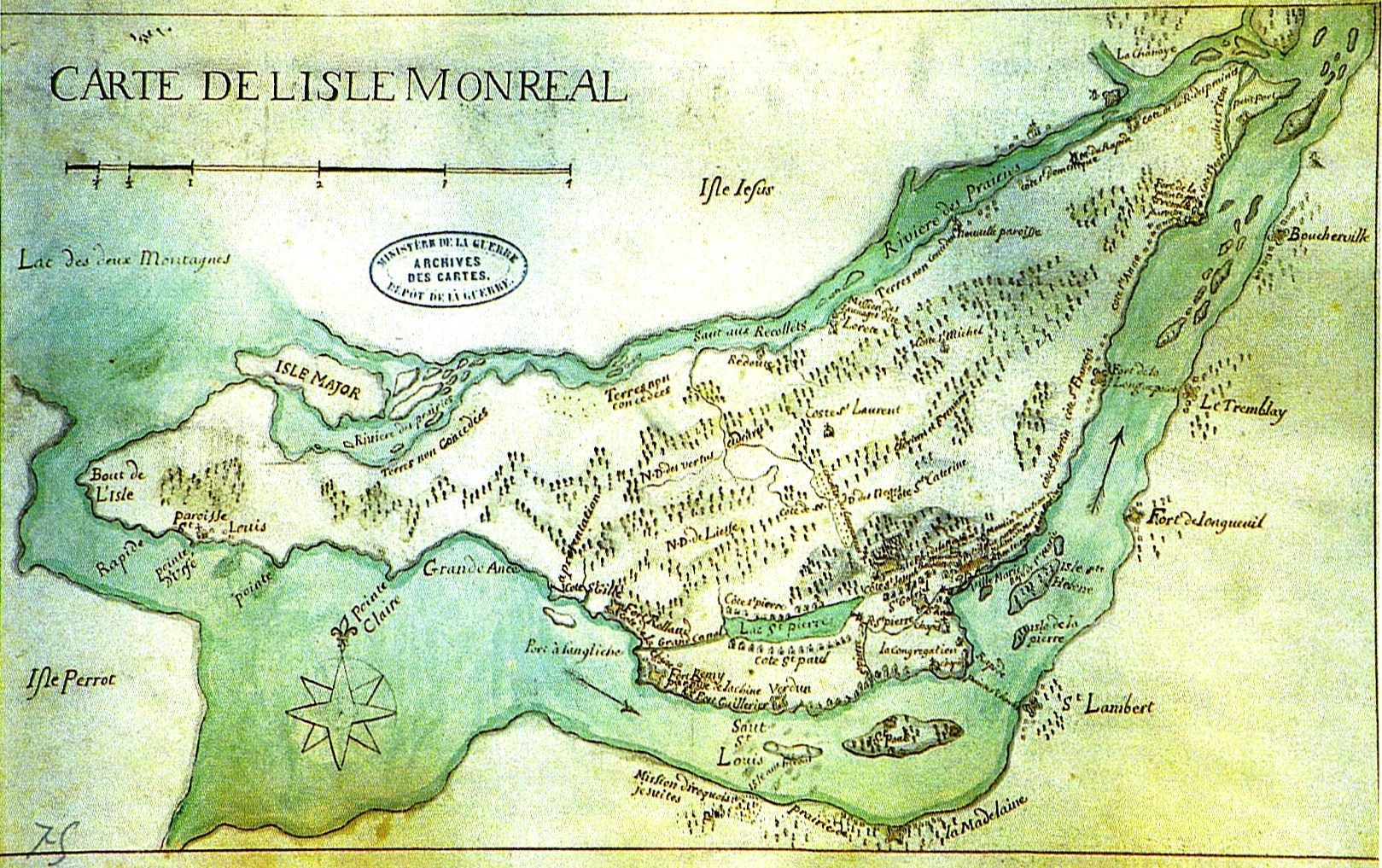
On a map of the Island of Montreal dated 1700, the words "Pointe Claire" are visible.

Pointe-Claire was first described by Nicolas Perrot in his account of 1669, and the name Pointe-Claire appeared on a map as early as 1686. Although Samuel de Champlain canoed through the area in 1613, he reported no village or dwelling visible.

The urbanization of the territory of Pointe-Claire began in the 1600s, when the Sulpicians were lords of the island of Montreal. Land on the island of Montreal was granted to the Sulpicians for development as early as 1663. They began to grant concessions along major waterways.

In 1678, the first concession on the land under the seigneurial system was to Jean Guenet who named his property Beau Repaire. This was near the future village of Beaurepaire, located in what is now Beaconsfield. on 4 June 1910, the village of Beaconsfield separates from the parish of Saint-Joachim-de-la-Pointe-Claire

The first concession of land that is still in the current city limits of Pointe-Claire, was in 1684 to Pierre Cabassier, for a lot just east of Pointe Charlebois. Under the seigneurial system, the Sulpicians had to build a mill for the colonists, who in turn had to grind their grain there at a set fee. The arrival of French settlers in Pointe-Claire began in 1698-1699.

In 1707, after the Great Peace of Montreal was signed in 1701, the Chemin du Roy (now Lakeshore Road) from Dorval to the western tip of Montreal Island was opened having been ordered by intendant Jacques Raudot, and the parish was subdivided in three côtes: St. Rémy (present-day Boulevard Des Sources), St. Jean, and St. Charles. Between côtes St. Rémy and St. Charles lay 33 lots (numbered 145 to 177). These were generally three arpents wide by 20 or 30 deep. Up to this time Pointe-Claire had only been accessible by boat.

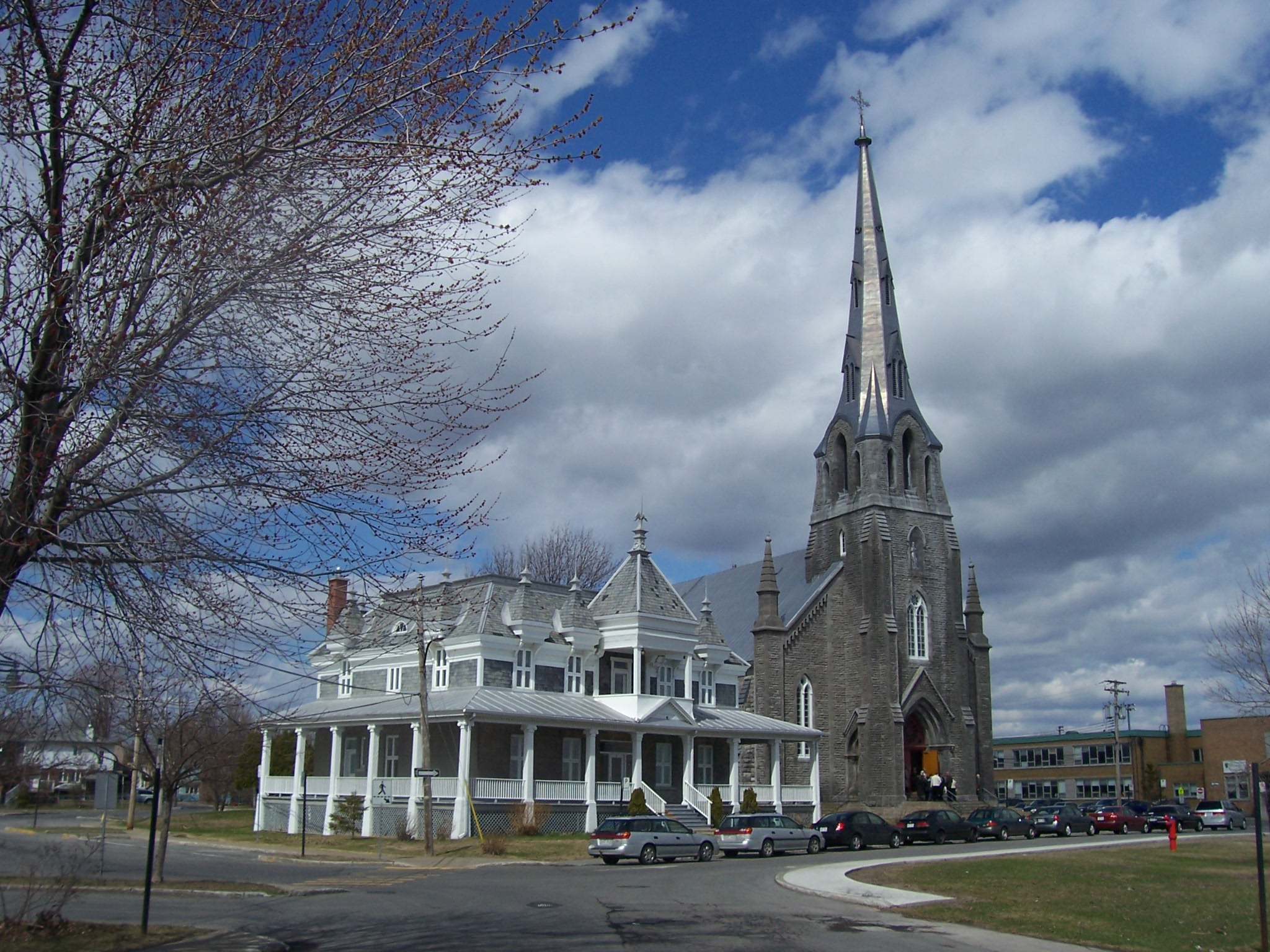
Church and presbytery of Saint-Joachim de Pointe-Claire

On 13 October 1713, the seminary formed a parish on the land that now includes Pointe-Claire and much of the West Island, and in 1714 a church was built at the point, at the site of the present-day church. Up to that time the area was served by an itinerant missionary priest. Initially the church was called Saint-Francois-de-Sales, but it was renamed six months later to Saint-Joachim de la Pointe Claire. The church and presbytery, both built of stone, formed a fort about two arpents (7,000 m^{2}, 75,000 sq ft) in area, surrounded by stakes. The construction was ordered by Governor Beauharnois out of fear of the Iroquois. The point was used as a stopover by voyageurs en route to the interior.

In 1728–1729, the first lots were granted, near the fort, to a blacksmith and to a carpenter. By 1765 there were 783 residents, 74 lots owned by 35 individuals, and 19 houses, some built of stone, but most of wood.

On 1 July 1845, the Village Municipality of Saint-Joachim-de-la-Pointe-Claire was created, before losing its municipal status on 1 September 1847, as was common in Quebec for many local entities. On 2 September 1854, it was reestablished.

The Grand Trunk Railway built the railroad through the area in 1855, linking Pointe-Claire to Montreal. This brought people, and with them property development in an area that up to then had been largely agricultural. It also improved the welfare of farmers by providing a ready market for their goods. Suburban development began in 1893 when Otto Frederick Lilly acquired land spanning Boulevard Saint-Jean. He used his influence with the Canadian Pacific Railway to have a station added to the line at the end of Cedar Avenue, which he also paved from there down to Lakeshore Road. Both sides of Cedar Avenue were built up by 1920.

After the British North America Act 1867, Pointe-Claire was included in the new federal riding of Jacques Cartier. In the election of 7 August, the men (suffrage did not extend to women until 1940) of Pointe-Claire elected the Conservative Guillaume Gamelin Gaucher.

In 1900, a major fire destroyed much of the village. The fire was discovered in an uninhabited building around 2:00 a.m., 22 May 1900. The wind caused the fire to spread to surrounding houses. The only water supply was from village wells or carried in buckets from the river. A small two-wheeled hose reel and hand pump was the only village fire protection. Locals failed to put out the fire and asked for help from Montreal. Equipment was sent by train but did not arrive in time to help. The worst of the damage was on the rue de l'église. In all about 30 buildings were destroyed, including the post office, the town hall, and the residences of about 200 people.

On 14 March 1911, the Village Municipality of Saint-Joachim-de-la-Pointe-Claire changed status and name to Ville (city/town) de Pointe-Claire.

Provincial highway number 2 (now Autoroute 20) was built alongside the railway in 1940, following expropriation of property. This led to a move of much of the town from the south to the north of the highway, namely the town hall, recreation centre, police station, and fire station.

In 1955, the City of Pointe-Claire annexed large portions of the Parish Municipality of Saint-Joachim-de-la-Pointe-Claire (which was formed on 1 September 1855). Remaining portions of the municipal parish became the Town of Kirkland on 24 March 1961. In 1958, a new City Hall was built and Pointe-Claire changed status from Ville to Cité ("city"), but in 1967, this was reverted.

From 2002 to 2006 there were municipal reorganizations across the province, which included a reorganization of Montreal; Pointe-Claire was merged into Montreal and became a borough. However, after political changes (2003 Quebec general election and the 2004 Quebec municipal referendums) it was re-constituted as an independent city in 2006, along with a number of other boroughs.

== Geography ==
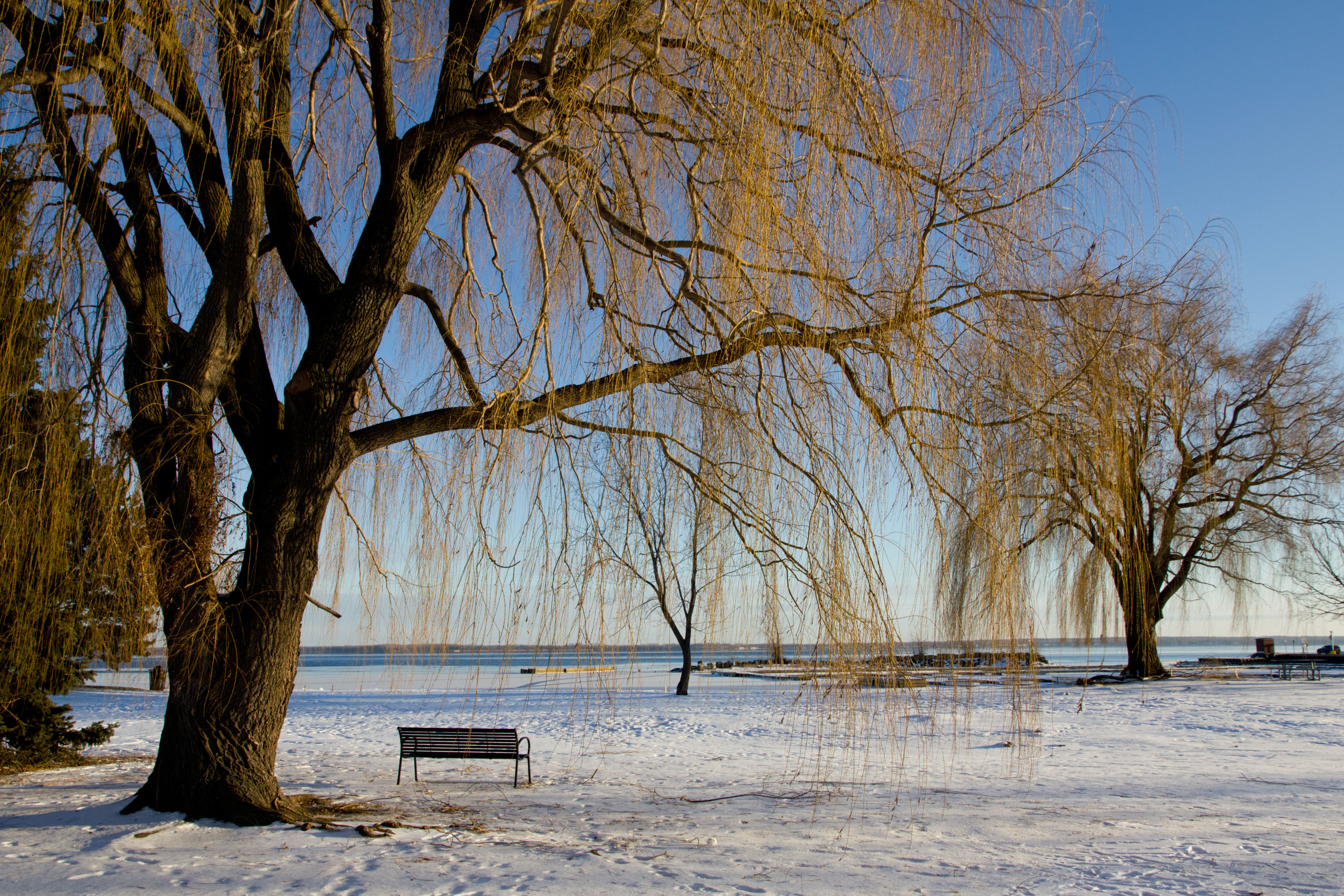
View from Pointe Claire over Lake Saint-Louis in December 2012

The shoreline of Pointe-Claire along Lake Saint-Louis is at about 30 metres (98 ft) above sea level and rises along a fault by about 30 metres (98 ft) not far from shore, more steeply in the west. The eastern side has a soil rich in clay, while the western side is stonier with limestone strata. Pointe-Claire is bounded on the north by Dollard-des-Ormeaux, on the east by Dorval, on the south by Lac Saint-Louis, and on the west by Kirkland and Beaconsfield.

Pointe-Claire is entirely urbanised and developed. There are 38 public parks and green spaces with 5 baseball/softball diamonds, 26 playgrounds, 19 soccer pitches, 7 outdoor swimming pools, 24 tennis courts, 10 outdoor skating rinks, and five shoreline areas.

Large green spaces include:

- The public Terra-Cotta Natural Park which is a natural green space of 39 hectares (96 acres), with six kilometers (4 miles) of paths. From 1912 to 1962, a clay deposit on the site was exploited by the Montréal Terra Cotta and Lumber Co. The clay, mixed with sawdust, was baked on site to produce hollow tiles used in construction.
- The Last Post Fund National Field of Honour, a National Historic Site of Canada, which is open to the public.
- The private Beaconsfield Golf Course, on the site of a disused quarry which supplied limestone for the construction of the Victoria Bridge in 1860.

=== Climate ===
Pointe-Claire has a humid continental climate (Köppen: Dfb).

Climate data for Pointe-Claire
| Month | Jan | Feb | Mar | Apr | May | Jun | Jul | Aug | Sep | Oct | Nov | Dec | Year |
|---|---|---|---|---|---|---|---|---|---|---|---|---|---|
| Mean daily maximum °C (°F) | −4.8 (23.4) | −3.0 (26.6) | 2.6 (36.7) | 10.4 (50.7) | 18.2 (64.8) | 23.2 (73.8) | 26.0 (78.8) | 25.1 (77.2) | 21.1 (70.0) | 13.5 (56.3) | 6.2 (43.2) | −1.2 (29.8) | 11.4 (52.6) |
| Daily mean °C (°F) | −8.5 (16.7) | −7.2 (19.0) | −1.4 (29.5) | 6.1 (43.0) | 13.7 (56.7) | 19.1 (66.4) | 21.8 (71.2) | 20.7 (69.3) | 16.5 (61.7) | 9.7 (49.5) | 3.1 (37.6) | −4.1 (24.6) | 7.5 (45.4) |
| Mean daily minimum °C (°F) | −12.6 (9.3) | −11.9 (10.6) | −5.6 (21.9) | 1.9 (35.4) | 9.1 (48.4) | 14.6 (58.3) | 17.6 (63.7) | 16.6 (61.9) | 12.3 (54.1) | 6.2 (43.2) | −0.1 (31.8) | −7.5 (18.5) | 3.4 (38.1) |
| Average precipitation mm (inches) | 59.8 (2.35) | 56.4 (2.22) | 60.1 (2.37) | 73.0 (2.87) | 63.7 (2.51) | 85.6 (3.37) | 75.4 (2.97) | 80.0 (3.15) | 63.9 (2.52) | 69.5 (2.74) | 60.8 (2.39) | 77.1 (3.04) | 825.3 (32.5) |
Source: Weather.Directory

== Demographics ==
Historical populations
| Year | Pop. | ±% |
|---|---|---|
| 1871 | 461 | — |
| 1881 | 443 | −3.9% |
| 1891 | 514 | +16.0% |
| 1901 | 555 | +8.0% |
| 1911 | 793 | +42.9% |
| 1921 | 2,617 | +230.0% |
| 1931 | 4,058 | +55.1% |
| 1941 | 4,536 | +11.8% |
| 1951 | 8,753 | +93.0% |
| 1956 | 15,208 | +73.7% |
| 1961 | 22,709 | +49.3% |
| 1966 | 26,784 | +17.9% |
| 1971 | 27,303 | +1.9% |
| 1976 | 25,917 | −5.1% |
| 1981 | 24,571 | −5.2% |
| 1986 | 26,026 | +5.9% |
| 1991 | 27,647 | +6.2% |
| 1996 | 28,435 | +2.9% |
| 2001 | 29,286 | +3.0% |
| 2006 | 30,161 | +3.0% |
| 2011 | 30,790 | +2.1% |
| 2016 | 31,380 | +1.9% |
| 2021 | 33,488 | +6.7% |
Source: Statistics Canada

According to the Office québécois de la langue française, Pointe-Claire has been officially recognized as a bilingual municipality since 2 Nov 2005.

In the 2021 census conducted by Statistics Canada, Pointe-Claire had a population of 33,488 living in 13,313 of its 13,823 total private dwellings, a change of 6.7% from its 2016 population of 31,380. With a land area of 18.91 km^{2} (7.30 sq mi), it had a population density of 1,770.9/km^{2} (4,586.6/sq mi) in 2021.

Canada census – Pointe-Claire community profile

| | 2021 | 2016 |
| Population | 33,488 (+6.7% from 2016) | 31,380 (+1.9% from 2011) |
| Land area | 18.91 km^{2} (7.30 sq mi) | 18.90 km^{2} (7.30 sq mi) |
| Population density | 1,770.9/km^{2} (4,587/sq mi) | 1,660.0/km^{2} (4,299/sq mi) |
| Median age | 49.2 (M: 46.0, F: 51.6) | 47.6 (M: 45.1, F: 49.6) |
| Private dwellings | 13,823 (total) | 12,835 (total) |
| Median household income | | $80,242 |

References: 2021 2016

Home Language (2021)
| Language | Population | Percentage (%) |
|---|---|---|
| English | 20,705 | 63% |
| French | 5,485 | 17% |
| Other | 4,660 | 14% |

Mother Tongue (2021)
| Language | Population | Percentage (%) |
|---|---|---|
| English | 15,595 | 47% |
| French | 6,750 | 21% |
| Other | 8,565 | 26% |

Visible Minorities (2021)
| Ethnicity | Population | Percentage (%) |
|---|---|---|
| Not a visible minority | 23,545 | 75% |
| Visible minorities | 8,015 | 25% |

== Economy ==
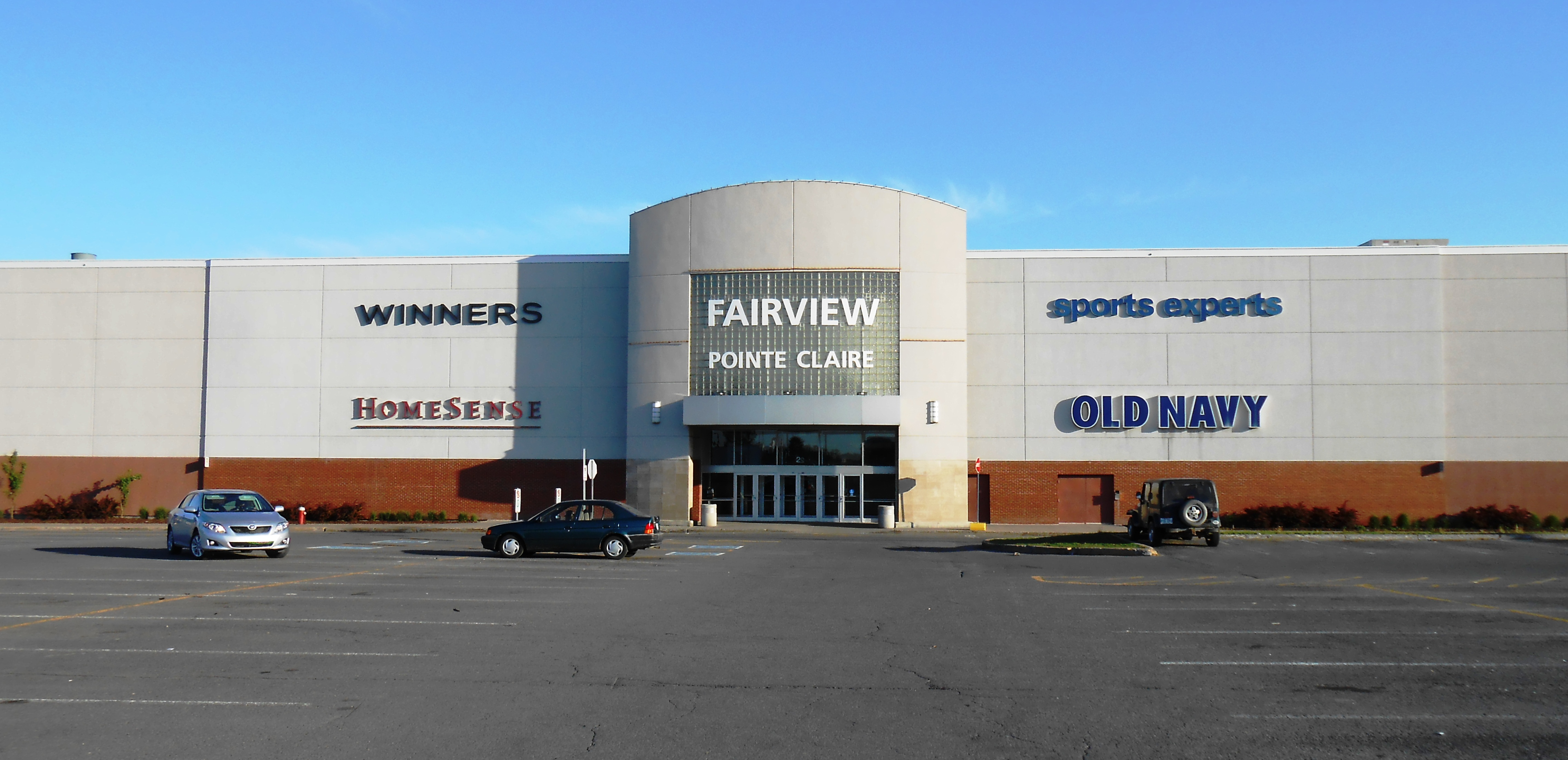
Fairview Pointe-Claire, a major regional mall in Pointe-Claire

The city has a large business and industrial park spanning both sides of Quebec Autoroute 40. The manufacturing sector is the largest provider of jobs in Pointe-Claire, with 7,005 employees or 23.7 percent of employment. Employment in manufacturing has been declining, while employment has been growing in healthcare and social services. Retail is the second biggest sector with 17.7 percent of the total. Major employers (more than 500 employees) include: Future Electronics, Lakeshore General Hospital, Avon, Hewitt Équipement (CAT dealer), City of Pointe-Claire, Lumen, and Bell TV. Employers of more than 200 employees include: Réno-Dépôt, El Ran Furniture, Tyco Medical, Hudson's Bay Company, and FPInnovations. Companies headquartered in Pointe-Claire include Bouclair, Novacam Technologies, Odan Laboratories, The Canadian Salt Company Limited and Unidisc Music.

== Local government ==
As of 2025, the mayor of Pointe-Claire is John Belvedere. There are eight city councillors.

- Claudine Demers (District 1—Cedar-Le Village)
- Ludovic Matthews (District 2—Lakeside)
- Kelly Thorstad-Cullen (District 3—Valois)
- Andrew Swidzinski (District 4—Cedar Park Heights)
- Cynthia Homan (District 5—Lakeside Heights)
- Bruno Tremblay (District 6—Seigniory)
- Eric Stork (District 7—Northview)
- Mike Potvin (District 8—Oneida)

Provincially, Pointe-Claire is in the Jacques-Cartier electoral district, along with Baie-D'Urfé, Beaconsfield, Sainte-Anne-de-Bellevue, and Senneville. It is the only provincial electoral district in Quebec with an Anglophone majority. From 1973 to 1981 it was in the now-defunct Pointe-Claire electoral district.

As part of the Urban Agglomeration of Montreal, 51% of locally collected taxes are transferred to the agglomeration as of 2019. Pointe-Claire in turn sends a representative to the 29-member agglomeration council.

=== Former mayors ===
List of former mayors:

- Edmond Robillard (1855–1864)
- Pierre Charles Valois (1864–1866, 1869–1878)
- William McKinnon (1867–1868)
- Pierre Alphonse Valois (1879–1881)
- Philias Roy (1881)
- Godfroid Madore (1881–1884, 1886–1896)
- Calixte Brault (1884–1886)
- Gabriël Valois (1897–1899)
- Thimoléon Legault (1899–1900, 1902–1907)
- Emilien Mayers (1901–1902)
- Stéphanus Brisebois (1908)
- Aldéric Lesage (1908–1913)
- Robert Meredith (1913–1915)
- Joseph Martin (1915–1917)
- William Henry Black (1917–1919)
- Ambroise Cartier (1919–1921)
- James Nebbs (1921–1923)
- Joseph Léon Vital Mallette (1923–1925, 1927–1929)
- Sydmer Wallace Ewing (1925–1927)
- Eric Grantley Donegani (1929–1931)
- Ernest de Bellefeuille (1931–1933)
- Henry Edward Woolmer (1933–1935)
- William Larocque (1935–1937)
- Joseph Kenworthy (1937–1939)
- Wilbrod Alphonse Bastien (1939–1941, 1948–1950)
- William John Moore Kenna (1941–1944)
- Donat Demers (1944–1946)
- John Clifford Mann (1946–1948)
- Charles Barnes (1950–1952)
- Ernest Bélair (1952–1954)
- Olive Louise Urquhart (1954–1956, 1958–1961)
- J. Maurice Arpin (1956–1958)
- Arthur Ewen Séguin (1961–1974)
- David W. Beck (1974–1982)
- Malcolm Campbell Knox (1982–1998)
- William Franklin MacMurchie (1998–2002, 2006–2013)
- Morris Trudeau (2013–2017)
- Tim Thomas (2021–2025)
- John Belvedere (2017–2021, 2025-present)

== Infrastructure ==
Municipal sports and leisure facilities include the Aquatic Centre, Bob Birnie Arena, Pointe-Claire Public Library, Stewart Hall Cultural Centre, the Sailing Base at Grande-Anse Park, near the Pointe-Claire Canoe Club. Private facilities also exist, such as the Pointe-Claire Yacht Club.

The Pointe-Claire Water Treatment Plant distributes an average of 65,000,000 litres (14,300,000 imp gal; 17,200,000 US gal) of potable water per day to a population of 87,248 people and approximately 1000 business and commercial users spread out in the city of Pointe-Claire, Beaconsfield, Baie-D'Urfé, Kirkland, Dollard-des-Ormeaux, Sainte-Anne-de-Bellevue and Senneville.

=== Transportation ===
Both Autoroute 20 and Autoroute 40 cross Pointe-Claire from east to west, both with intersections at Boulevard Saint-Jean and Boulevard Des Sources, the major north-south roads in the city. Parallel along Autoroute 20 are the Canadian National and Canadian Pacific Railway lines.

Pointe-Claire is served by three stations on Exo's Vaudreuil–Hudson line: Pointe-Claire station located at Donegani Avenue and Ashgrove Avenue, Valois station located at Avenue De-la-Baie-de-Valois (Valois Bay) and Donegani Avenue, and Cedar Park station also located on Donegani Avenue between Applebee Avenue and Aurora Avenue. The city is also served by several bus routes operated by Société de transport de Montréal with a major terminal located at Fairview Pointe-Claire.

Since 18 May 2026, Pointe-Claire has been served by two stations on the Réseau express métropolitain rapid transit network: Fairview–Pointe-Claire station on Fairview Avenue, and Des Sources station on Des Sources Boulevard.

Local bus transportation is provided by Société de transport de Montréal.

== Public safety and animal services ==
Municipal bylaw enforcement and animal control are provided by the city's Public Security force.

The city of Pointe-Claire uses the services of Contrôle animalier Vaudreuil-Soulange for injured animals or domestic pets who have been found. Public security will bring uninjured stray pets to a temporary holding pen at the security building at 399 St Jean Boulevard, and the animals are transferred to Contrôle animalier Vaudreuil-Soulange if not claimed.

Police services are provided by the Montreal Police Service. Fire and rescue services are provided by the Montreal Fire Department. Emergency Medical Services are provided by Urgences Sante. Emergency management, such as response to storms and flooding, as well as emergency medical care at public events is provided by the Pointe Claire Volunteer Rescue Unit.

== Education ==
The Lester B. Pearson School Board (LBPSB) operates Anglophone public school. They run two elementary schools: Clearpoint (formerly Cedar Park) and St. John Fisher, and two high schools: John Rennie, and St. Thomas. In addition St. Edmund Elementary School and Beacon Hill Elementary School in Beaconsfield as well as Wilder-Penfield Elementary in Dollard-des-Ormeaux serve sections of the city.

Lindsay Place High School is a former public high school that was part of the Lester B. Pearson School Board. It opened in 1962 and closed in 2021. St. Thomas High School has relocated into the building previously occupied by Lindsday Place.

The Centre de services scolaire Marguerite-Bourgeoys operates Francophone public schools, but were previously operated by the Commission scolaire Marguerite-Bourgeoys until 15 June 2020. The change was a result of a law passed by the Quebec government that changed the school board system from denominational to linguistic. They run three primary schools: Marguerite-Bourgeoys, Pointe-Claire (formerly Lakeside Heights Elementary), and Saint-Louis, and one high school, the École secondaire Felix-Leclerc (formerly École secondaire Saint-Thomas).

== See also ==
- List of anglophone communities in Quebec
- People from Pointe-Claire
