= Sainte-Geneviève, Quebec =

Sainte-Geneviève
- Neighbourhood
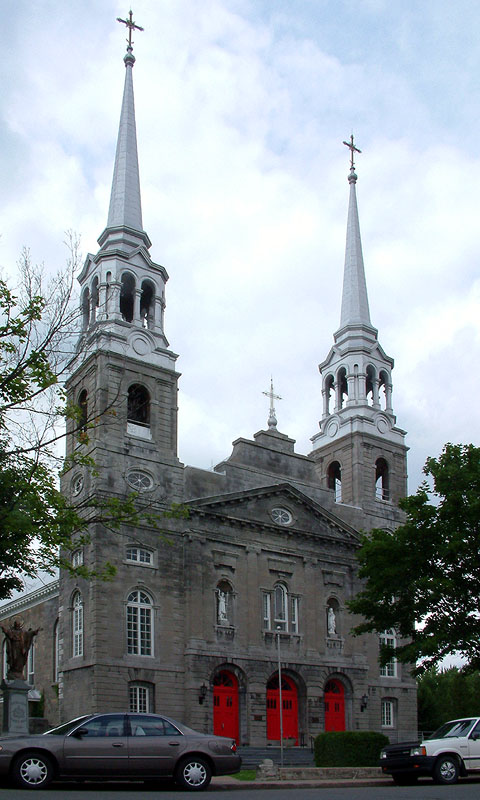
- Église Sainte-Geneviève

- Map of Sainte-Geneviève

- Location of Sainte-Geneviève in Montreal
- Coordinates: 45°29′6.1″N 73°51′53.3″W
- Country: Canada
- Province: Quebec
- City: Montreal
- Borough: L'Île-Bizard–Sainte-Geneviève

Area
  - Land: 0.86 km^{2} (0.33 sq mi)

Population (2011)
  - Total: 3,450
  - Density: 4,020/km^{2} (10,400/sq mi)
  - Change (2006-2011): ▲5.7%
  - Dwellings (2011): 1,648
- Time zone: UTC-5 (Eastern (EST))
  - Summer (DST): UTC-4 (EDT)
- Postal code span: H9H
- Area codes: (514) and (438)

Sainte-Geneviève (French pronunciation: [sɛ̃t ʒənvjɛv]) was a municipality located on the Island of Montreal in southwestern Quebec, Canada. It is now part of the Borough of L'Île-Bizard–Sainte-Geneviève in the City of Montreal, created on January 1, 2002.

The municipality, a small village populated by traditional Quebec-style dwellings and colonial mansions, is located on the north-west shore of the Island of Montreal along Gouin Boulevard, overlooking the Rivière des Prairies and across from Île Bizard located to the north. It is surrounded by the former municipality of Pierrefonds to the west, south and east.

The Cégep Gérald-Godin and the Église Sainte-Geneviève, built in 1844 and designed by renowned Quebec architect Thomas Baillargé, are located here.

== History ==
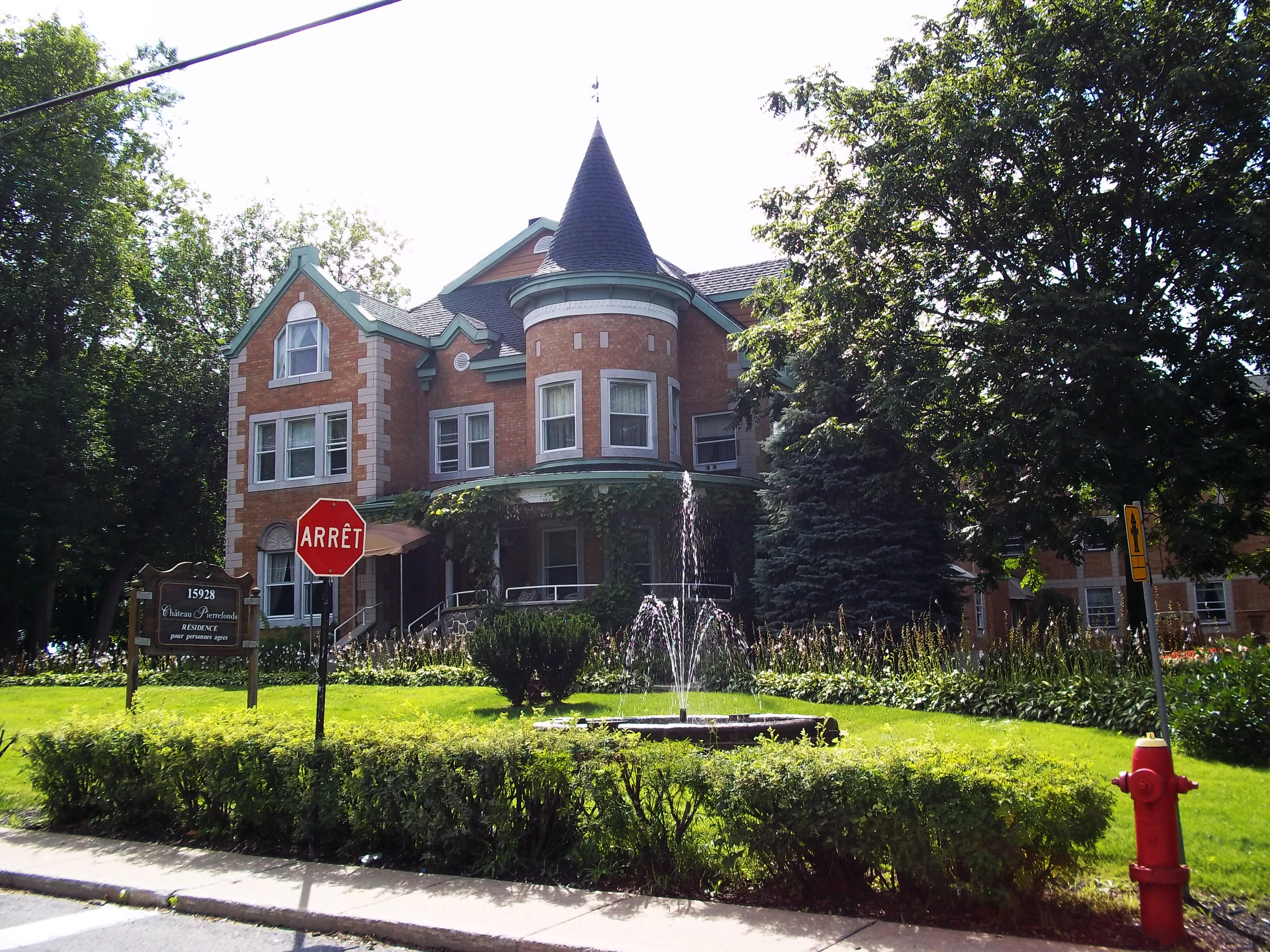
Château Pierrefonds built by Joseph-Adolphe Chauret in 1902. Rebuilt in February 1993 after it burned down. Renovations in 2013 added extensions keeping the same style.

=== Catholic Parish ===
The signing of the Great Peace of Montreal in 1701 allowed the French habitants to colonize the western part of the Island of Montreal. In 1720 a road was built, and the Sulpicians mapped out the area. In 1739 the Roman Catholic Archdiocese of Quebec approved the establishment of a canonical parish dedicated to Saint Geneviève. The following year a chapel was completed. The first church was built in 1751. Antoine Faucon, father of Saint-Sulpice, participated in the construction of the village's first church. The present building dates from the years 1843 to 1847.

=== Civil Parish ===
The establishment of the civil parish of Sainte-Geneviève, which was named after the church, occurred in 1845. On June 9, 1859, it was recognized as the Municipality of the Village of Sainte-Geneviève. In 1893, it was connected to Île Bizard across the Rivière des Prairies by a bridge, which replaced a ferry. The original 1893 bridge was removed in 1966.

=== Division Into Municipalities ===
When the Paroisse de Ste Genevieve was established, Sainte-Geneviève included the territory of the city of Roxboro and Pierrefonds. The formerly separate municipalities were merged into the city of Montreal on January 1, 2002 following municipal mergers organized by the provincial government at the time. Sainte-Geneviève's territory also included the city of Dollard-des-Ormeaux, which also was briefly part of the city of Montreal from 2002 until its demerger on January 1, 2006.

Several successive divisions reduced the size of the town of Sainte-Geneviève significantly. In 1904, Sainte-Geneviève-de-Pierrefonds became independent from Sainte-Geneviève, Roxboro in 1914, followed in 1924 by Dollard-des-Ormeaux.

At the heart of the conflict that led to the separation of Sainte-Geneviève was the famous lawyer Joseph-Adolphe Chauret, who in 1902 built a stately home reminiscent of homes in Pierrefonds, France, in the Department of Oise. He called his thatched house the "Château Pierrefonds."

In 1935, the two villages of Sainte-Geneviève and Sainte-Geneviève-de-Pierrefonds were merged and became once again the village of Sainte-Geneviève. The name of Pierrefonds then disappeared until its reappearance in 1958, the founding date of the former city of Pierrefonds. In 1959, the Village of Sainte-Geneviève was recognized as Ville Sainte-Geneviève.

=== Amalgamation Into City of Montreal ===
On January 1, 2002 Ville Sainte-Geneviève was merged into the City of Montreal borough of "L'Île-Bizard–Sainte-Geneviève". The citizens voted 65.65% to secede in the demerger referendum on June 20, 2004 but did not meet the 35% requirement of the population condition, with only 21.49%(33.13%) of the total population voting. Sainte-Geneviève registered 2,303 people to vote in the demerger: YES 495 : NO 259: Total of Yes and NO votes 763: Voter turnout 33.13.
