= Pierrefonds Boulevard =

East-west road in Montreal, Quebec, Canada

Coordinates: 45.482731°N 73.861307°W

Pierrefonds Boulevard is an east-west boulevard in the northwest of the Island of Montreal, or the northern part of West Island. It runs mostly through the borough of Pierrefonds-Roxboro.

== History ==
Pierrefonds Boulevard has a total length of 9.3 km and is an important commercial street in the west of the island, known locally as West Island. It is named in honor of the Château de Pierrefonds in France, whose notary, Joseph-Adolphe Chauret, was impressed by the Château located in the city of the same name in France. Much of the boulevard was affected during the 1974 and 2017 Quebec floods. Planning of the road began in the early 1960s with surveying and grading started as early as 1962.

== Public transit ==
The boulevard is well-served by the STM. Routes include 468-Pierrefonds/Gouin and 470-Express Pierrefonds, both of which connect to the Côte-Vertu Metro (rapid transit) station, and the 376-Pierrefonds/Centre-ville, which runs during the overnight period.

== See also ==
- Boulevard Saint-Charles
- Boulevard Saint-Jean
- Boulevard Des Sources
