= Saint-Jean Boulevard =

Boulevard in Montreal, Canada

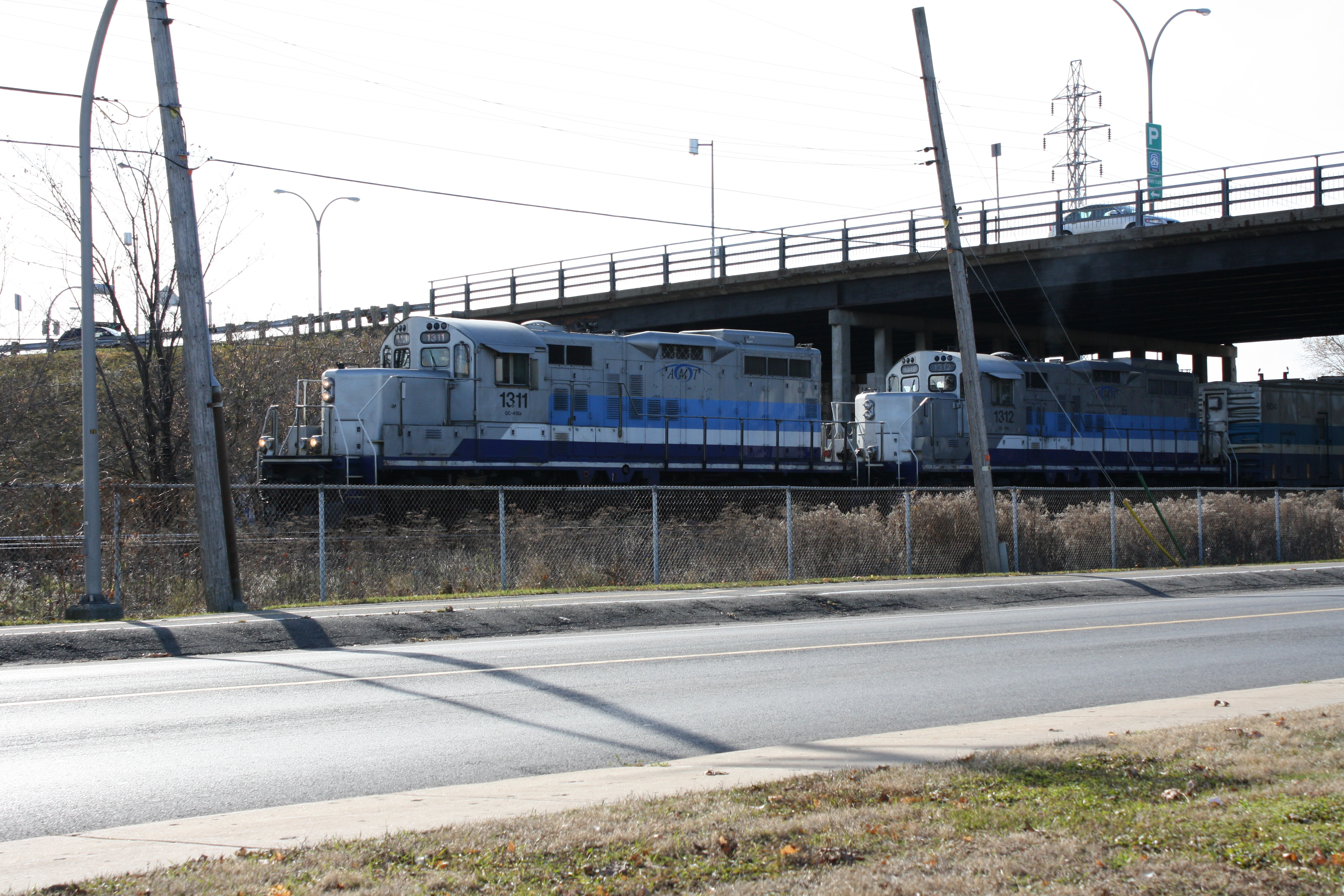
Overpass of Boulevard Saint-Jean crossing the CN and CP railroads

Saint-Jean Boulevard is a north–south artery located in Quebec, Canada, in the west of the island of Montreal (West Island).

The boulevard is one of the West Island main arteries that cross the island from north to south. It begins south at the intersection of Chemin du Bord-du-Lac in Pointe-Claire and intersects Highway 20 at Exit 50. It then reaches Dollard-des-Ormeaux where it intersects Highway 40 at Exit 52. Finally it reaches Pierrefonds Boulevard and Gouin Boulevard in the north.

== History ==
The route linking Lake Saint-Louis to the Prairie River dates back to the early 1700s. Following the Treaty of the Great Peace of 1701, the Lords of the Island of Montreal, the Sulpicians, drew a detailed map of the outline of the island in addition to three roads linking Lake St. Louis to the Prairie River. Saint-Jean was officially designated a boulevard in 1961. It was previously named “montée Saint-Jean”, reflecting its role as a link road between the two rivers.

== See also ==
- Boulevard Des Sources – parallel artery to Boulevard Saint-Jean to the east
- Boulevard Saint-Charles – parallel artery to Boulevard Saint-Jean to the west
