= Congregation Beth Tikvah =

Synagogue in Quebec, Canada

Congregation Beth Tikvah Ahavat Shalom Nusach Hoari
- Hebrew: ק״ק בית תקוה אהבת שלום נוסח האר״י
- Location in Montreal

Religion
- Affiliation: Modern Orthodox Judaism
- Rite: Ashkenazi
- Leadership: Rabbi Marc Mandel; Rabbi Dr. Mordecai E. Zeitz (emeritus)
- Status: Active

Location
- Location: 136 Westpark Boulevard, Dollard-des-Ormeaux, Quebec
- Country: Canada
- Interactive map of Congregation Beth Tikvah Ahavat Shalom Nusach Hoari
- Coordinates: 45°29′32″N 73°49′10″W

Architecture
- Type: Synagogue
- Established: 1964; 62 years ago

Website
- bethtikvah.ca

Congregation Beth Tikvah Ahavat Shalom Nusach Hoari (Hebrew: ק״ק בֵּית תִקְוָה אַהֲבָת שָׁלוֹם נוֹסָח הַאֲרִ״י), also known simply as Beth Tikvah (Hebrew: בֵּית תִקְוָה, transl. 'House of Hope'), is a Modern Orthodox synagogue in Dollard-des-Ormeaux, Quebec, Canada.

== History ==
Beth Tikvah was founded in 1964 by a group of about 20 young families who were considered pioneers of Jewish life in the West Island. Rabbi Mordecai Zeitz arrived at the invitation of local families, and with support from a synagogue-planting subsidy program of Yeshiva University.

A house was purchased which accommodated the congregation and Hebrew school until the fall of 1968, when a congregation that would soon reach 300 families moved into a new multi-purpose auditorium on the present site.

Beth Tikvah has run a supplementary school, Hebrew Academy, since the synagogue's establishment. The synagogue opened a full-time elementary day school, Hebrew Foundation School (Hebrew: בֵּית סֵפֶר הַיְסוֹד הַעִבְרִי), in the fall of 1970.

Since 2004, the synagogue has housed an eighteenth-century torah scroll from Rokycany, Bohemia, originally secured by the Czech Memorial Scrolls Centre in 1964. In August 2007, Beth Tikvah merged with Congregation Ahavat Shalom Nusach Hoari, formed in 1910 (Nusach Hoari) and 1915 (Ahavat Shalom–Anshei Galicia).

== Attacks ==
The synagogue was twice targeted in the aftermath of the October 7 attacks. The second such attack involved a firebombing, and the incident was condemned by Canadian Prime Minister Justin Trudeau.

== See also ==
- 2024 Melbourne synagogue attack
