= Bouclair =

Canadian home fashion and decor company

Bouclair Inc.
- Company type: Private
- Industry: Home furnishings retail
- Founded: 1970; 56 years ago
- Headquarters: 152 Avenue Alston; Pointe-Claire, Quebec; H9R 6B4 Canada
- Number of locations: 92 (2019)
- Area served: Canada, Europe, Asia, Oceania
- Key people: Peter Goldberg (President and CEO)
- Products: Window Coverings, Bedding, Furniture, Home Accents, Wall Decor and Lighting
- Number of employees: 1,200 (2015)
- Website: bouclair.com

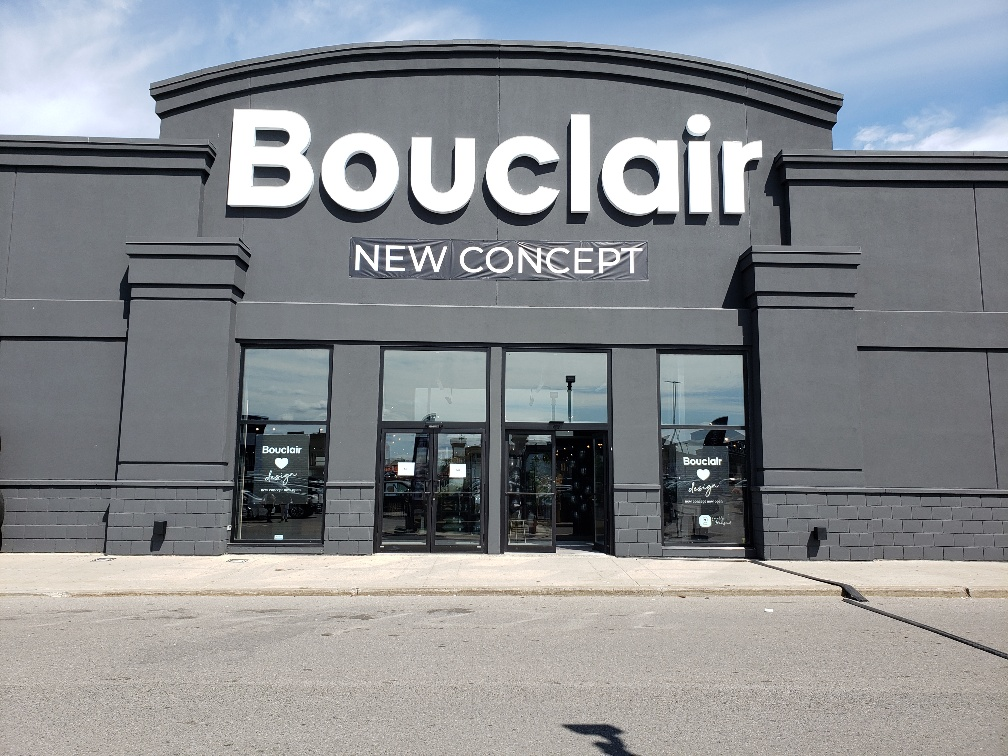
Bouclair new concept store, located in Brampton Ont.

Bouclair Inc. is a Canadian privately owned company and a lifestyle brand that offers home fashion and decor products including furniture, window coverings, bedding, lighting, home accents, wall decor and seasonal products through its own retail stores across Canada and online. The company is headquartered in Pointe-Claire, Quebec and operates 55 Bouclair stores across Quebec, Ontario, Western Canada, and Atlantic Canada.

The company offers shopping in stores, online or through its call centre. In November 2019, Alston Investments Inc., a new company that includes Goldberg as a shareholder, announced it has offered to acquire Bouclair to streamline and modernize the chain, including expanding its 'experiential' retail store concept and investing in e-commerce.

== History ==
Founded as a fabric and sewing business in 1970, Bouclair has evolved into home furnishings. The company currently operates under the leadership of its president, Peter Goldberg, who acquired the company in 2003 after leading a Management Buy-out.

== Expansion ==
In the late 1990s, the company opened numerous stores in Ontario and became a popular name amongst homeowners during this time. Since 2010, it has also expanded its presence in the rest of Canada, opening points of sale in Nova Scotia, New Brunswick, Newfoundland, Manitoba, Alberta, Saskatchewan and British Columbia. In the spring of 2006, Bouclair launched a new store concept called Bouclair Home (Bouclair Maison in French) diversifying its product offering to include fashionable home decor and furniture.

In 2012, Bouclair opened a wholesale division, marking the beginning of its international expansion, selling coordinated home collections in Europe, Asia and Oceania

Following the launch of its e-commerce site in March 2014, Bouclair also introduced its first complete line of furniture, with Atelier Bouclair – a higher-end collection of 21 design themes – sold online, orders in-store, through its call centre and by catalogue.

In November 2021, Bouclair opened its flagship store in Montreal's Griffintown neighbourhood.

Currently, the company has 55 stores, including 23 new store concepts, open in Canada in Alberta, Manitoba, Quebec, Ontario, and New Brunswick, with 1029 employees across the headquarter and stores.

== Products ==
Bouclair sells window coverings, bedding, lighting, wall decor, home accents, greenery, rugs, kids' furnishings and baby decor. The products are created by its team of in-house designers and presented as coordinated collections in its retail outlets.

== Recognition ==
La Presse recognized Bouclair in 2012 as a company to watch. In 2015, Bouclair ranked 223 amongst Top 500 Largest Companies in Quebec, Canada.
