= Saint-Joachim de Pointe-Claire Church =

Roman Catholic church in Pointe-Claire, Quebec, Canada

Coordinates: 45°25′37″N 73°49′31″W

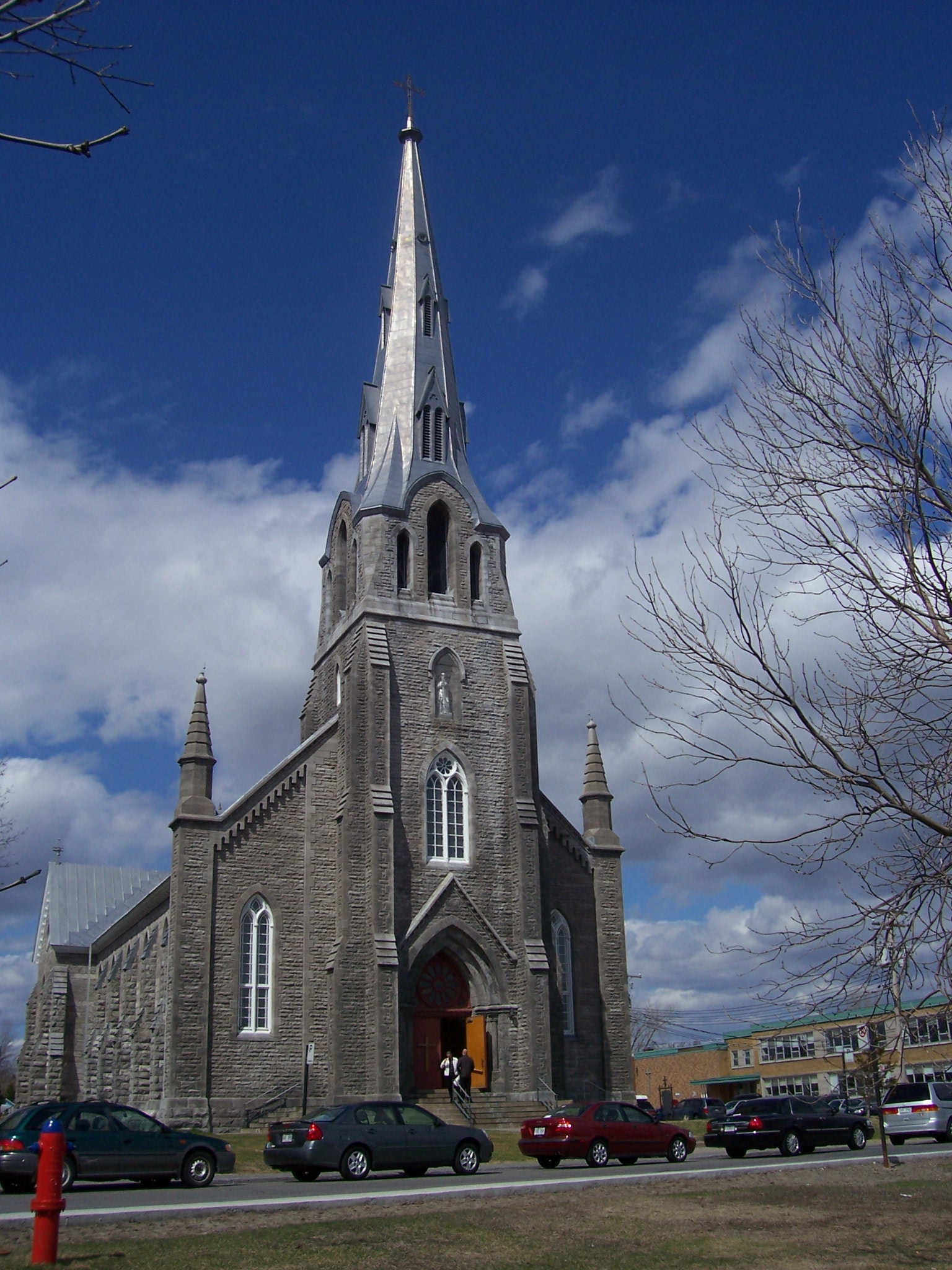
Saint-Joachim de Pointe-Claire Church

Saint-Joachim de Pointe-Claire Church (French: Église Saint-Joachim de Pointe-Claire) is a Roman Catholic church in Pointe-Claire, Quebec, Canada.

== History ==
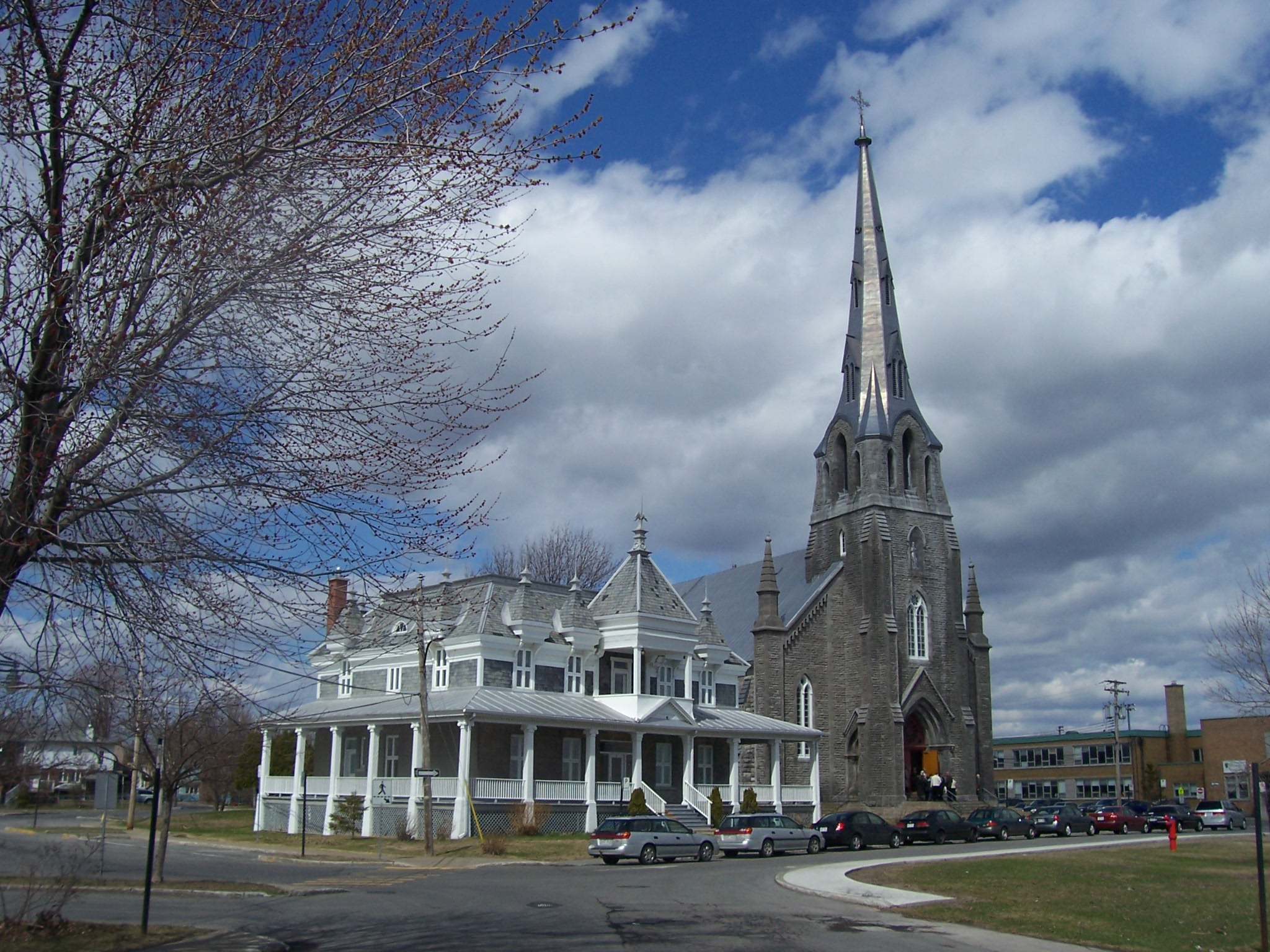
Saint-Joachim de Pointe-Claire Church and its presbytery

The first church on the site was a stone church built in 1713. A replacement was built between 1750 and 1755.

From 1868 to 1881 a third church was built alongside the second church according to plans by architect Victor Bourgeau. In April 1881 a fire destroyed both the old church and the new church. Some masonry from the old church was reused, as were the walls of the sacristy Construction of a replica was undertaken that year, and consecration was in September 1885. The organ was installed by the Compagnie d'Orgues Canadiennes in 1928. The church was restored in 1963–1964 and again in 1987.

== Design ==
It is made of grey stone in the Gothic Revival style, with the floorplan in the shape of a Latin cross. The exterior features buttresses, and a monumental steeple. The perfectly symmetrical design includes pinnacle-topped turrets at either side of the facade.

The walls include by gothic style windows. Frames and ornaments are hammered stone. The ornate interior includes many niches containing statues of the saints. carved patterns of quatrefoils. The apse comprises seven angled wall sections.
