= 2017 Quebec floods =

May 2017 weather event in Quebec, Canada

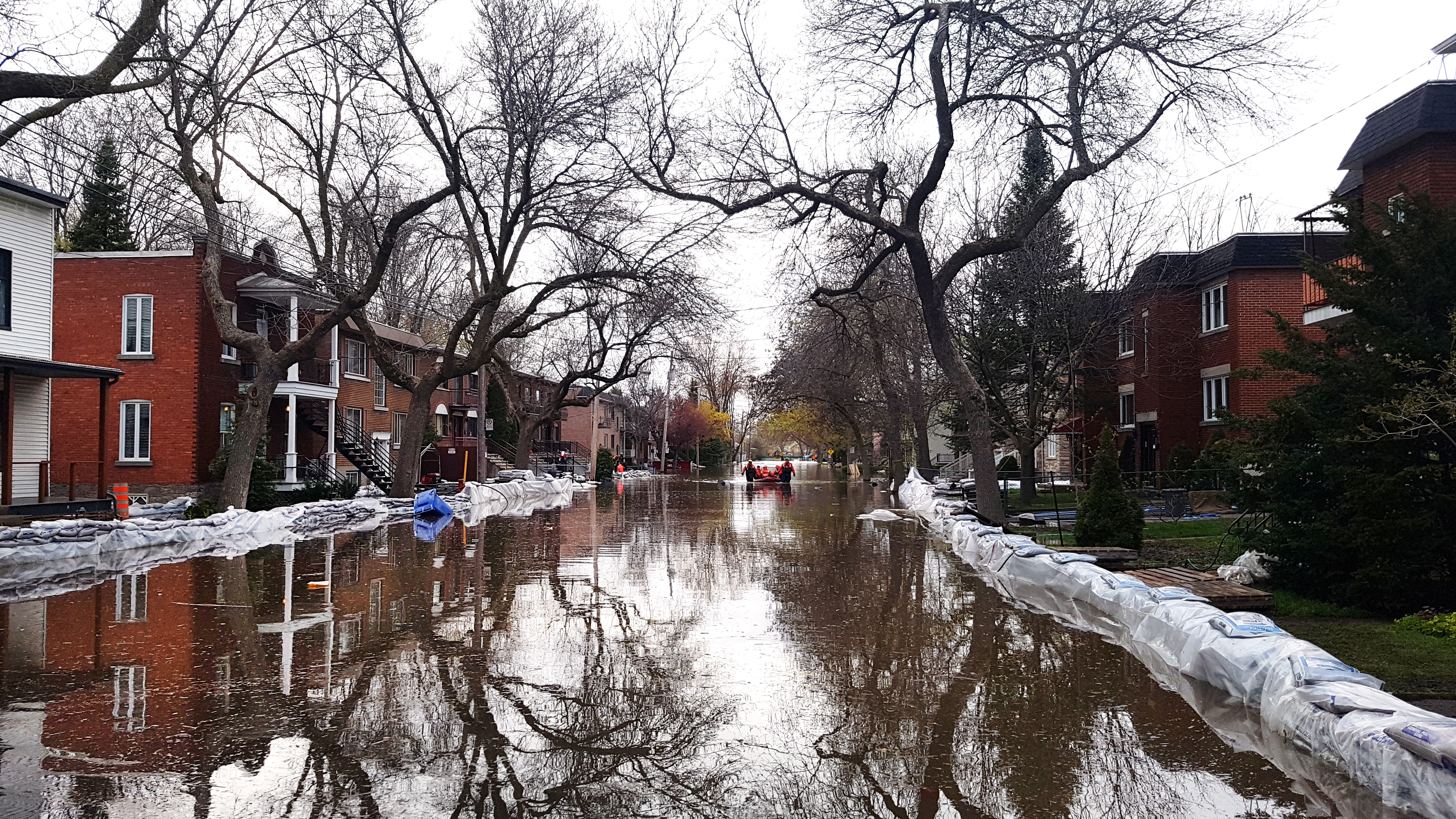
- Flooded street in the Ahuntsic-Cartierville borough of Montreal, 8 May 2017
- Date: 5 April 2017 – end of May 2017
- Location: Quebec, Canada
- Deaths: 2

Spring snowfall and heavy rain caused floods in southern Quebec on 3 May 2017. In total, 5,371 residences were flooded, 4,066 people were forced from their homes, and 261 municipalities were affected, largely in the Outaouais Region, the Greater Montreal Area, the Montérégie, the Mauricie, the Gaspésie and the Côte-Nord regions. The floods were listed as the third most significant weather event of 2017 by the Canadian Meteorological and Oceanographic Society.

Montreal and Laval then declared a state of emergency over the flooding.

== Background ==
While rising water levels due to melting snow and ice is common in the spring, cool weather and large spring snowstorms added to the issue. The March 2017 North American blizzard added another 70 centimetres of snow along the Saint Lawrence River Valley.

This issue was exacerbated by heavy rain in April and early May 2017. Montreal alone received 156 millimetres of rain in April, twice the monthly average and nearly beating the record of 159 mm from 2005.

== First floods ==
In the beginning of April, rising temperatures led to melting snow, which increased water levels in the Chaudière River. On 10 April, Quebec Route 276 was briefly closed between Saint-Joseph-de-Beauce and Saint-Joseph-des-Érables due to flooding, and minor flooding was reported in communities in the watershed.

In the Eastern Townships, several communities were affected by the floodwaters, closing roads in ten municipalities, including Danville, Lingwick, Saint-Ludger and Ayer's Cliff, with the communities of Asbestos and Weedon being the worst hit.

== Major flooding ==
=== Mauricie ===
On 30 April, the level of the Saint-Maurice River began to rise, causing concern among the public. The rising floodwaters washed out portions of Quebec Route 155 (one of the only links between the towns of La Tuque and Trois-Rivières) and the road between La Tuque and the Atikamekw community of Wemotaci. Route 155 remained closed to traffic until 8 May, when it was reopened to all but heavy vehicles. Until this point, people traveling between La Tuque and Trois-Rivieres needed to drive through the Saugenay Region, then down to Quebec City and Autoroute 40, which tripled the amount of travel time.

=== Outaouais ===
Flooding began in the Outaouais region on 20 April, when the Ottawa River flooded areas of Pontiac, while the Petite-Nation River flooded roads in the town of Saint-André-Avellin. Surrounding towns of Ripon, Cayamant, Duhamel, Gracefield, Montpellier and Waltham also experienced flooding, isolating some residents.

Portions of Quebec Autoroute 50 were flooded on 7 May after nearly two feet of rain over the proceeding two days. Emergency work by Transports Quebec reopened two lanes of the three-lane highway by 9 May. The closure of Autoroute 50 and surrounding flooding caused both the federal government and provincial government to close their offices in Gatineau, rather than have employees risk coming in.

Transport Quebec closed several roads on 7 May, including the Galipeault Bridge, due to rising water levels.

The Ottawa River crested on 8 May for most citizens in the Ottawa River Valley, specifically between Mattawa and Hawkesbury, Ontario. In Gatineau, the river reached a level of 45.08 meters, down 10 centimeters from previous reports. The local fire department in Gatineau rescued and evacuated approximately 533 people, with the Red Cross providing shelter for close to 1000.

In Ottawa, Mayor Jim Watson said that 346 residences had been flooded in the city, with 90% of them found in West Carleton-March Ward.

As of 10 May, the Canadian military had stationed 2,200 troops in Quebec, as well as dozens of military boats, helicopters, armoured vehicles and engineering equipment, and a naval frigate, HMCS Montréal.

=== Montérégie ===
Towns between Montreal and Ottawa, faced flooding near the end of April. This area is where the Ottawa River and the St. Lawrence River meet, and includes Lac Saint-Louis, Lac Saint-François and Lac des Deux-Montagnes. The town of Rigaud declared a state of emergency on 20 April to deal with rising floodwaters, calling for the evacuation of 470 households.

=== Montreal ===
The hardest hit areas on the Island of Montreal were communities close to the Rivière des Prairies, including Pierrefonds-Roxboro and L'Île-Bizard–Sainte-Geneviève

== See also ==
- History of flooding in Canada
