= Sources Boulevard =

Thoroughfare in Montreal, Canada

Boulevard des Sources
- Des Sources Boulevard
- Interactive map of Boulevard des Sources
- Major junctions: A-40 (TCH); R-138; A-20

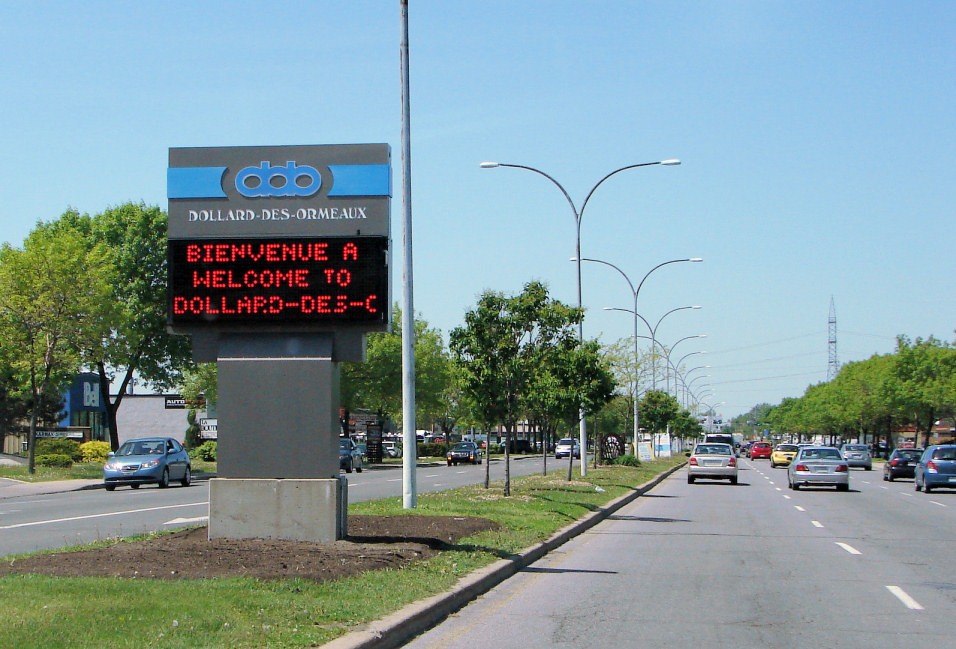
Boulevard des Sources at the Dollard-des-Ormeaux city limit

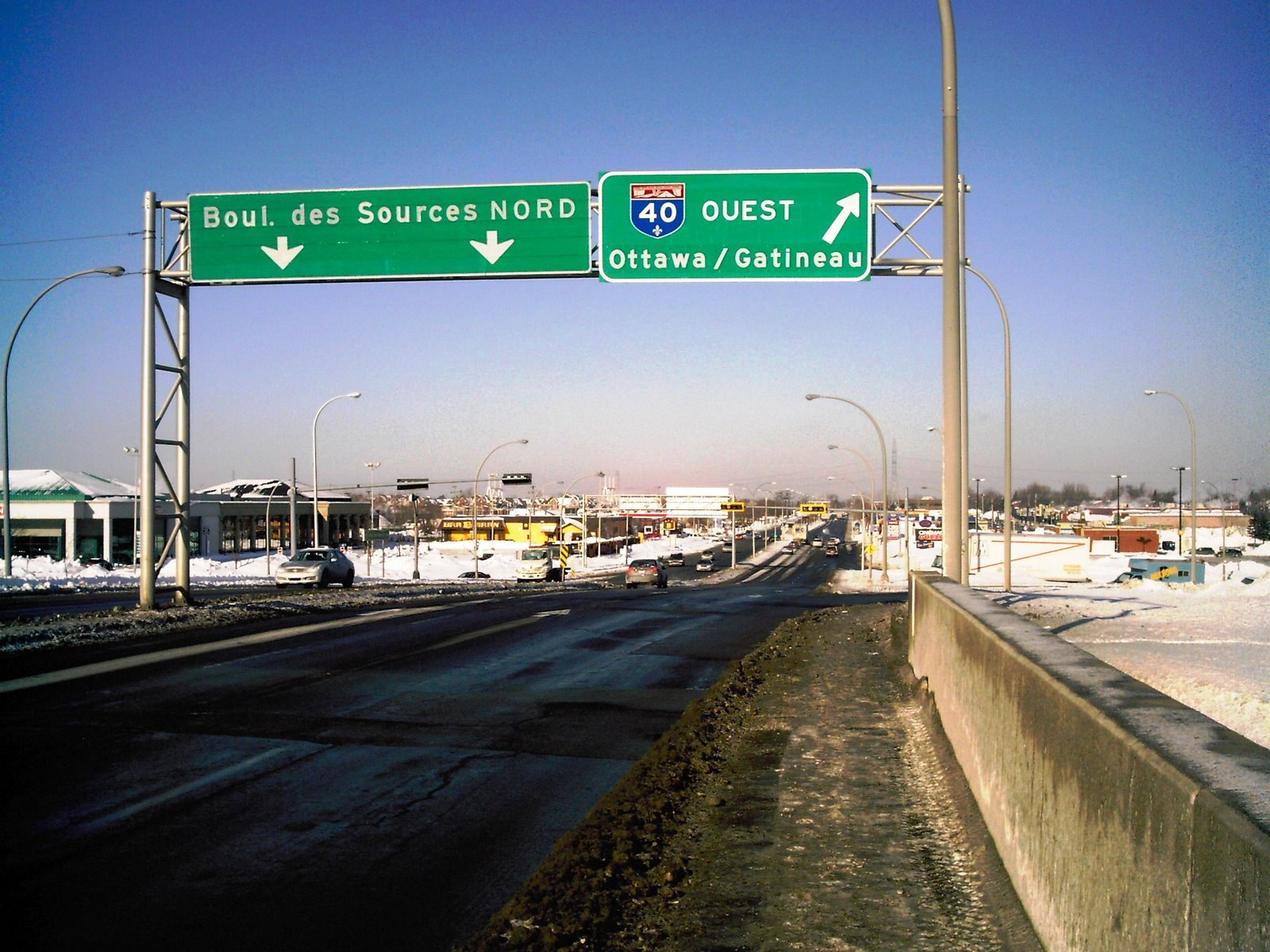
Boulevard des Sources at the Autoroute 40 overpass

Boulevard des Sources (French pronunciation: [bulvaʁ de suʁs]), often pronounced Sources (/ˈsɔɹsɪz/) Boulevard in English, is a north–south artery located in the west of the Island of Montreal, informally known locally as the West Island.

The boulevard crosses the island completely from north to south. In the south, it starts at the intersection of Chemin du Bord-du-Lac and intersects Highway 20 at Exit 53. It then intersects Highway 40 at Exit 55. Thereafter, it crosses the city of Dollard-des-Ormeaux and reaches Pierrefonds Boulevard and Gouin Boulevard in the north. It ends on Debours Street in a newly built residential area.

== History ==
Des Sources goes back to the 1700s when it facilitated the movement from one concession to the next — hence its former name “montée des Sources”. It was designated a boulevard only in 1961.

== Public transport ==
The 209 Des Sources serves the boulevard starting from YUL Montréal Trudeau airport to Roxboro Pierrefonds REM station. The 409 Express Des Sources goes from Av. Anselme-Lavigne to Du College metro station.

Des Sources station on the REM, located on the west side of Boulevard des Sources between Autoroute 40 and Boulevard Hymus, opened on May 18, 2026.

== See also ==
- Boulevard Saint-Jean – parallel artery to Boulevard des Sources to the west
- Boulevard Saint-Charles – parallel artery to Boulevard des Sources to the west
