= Saint-Charles Boulevard =

Street in Montreal, Canada

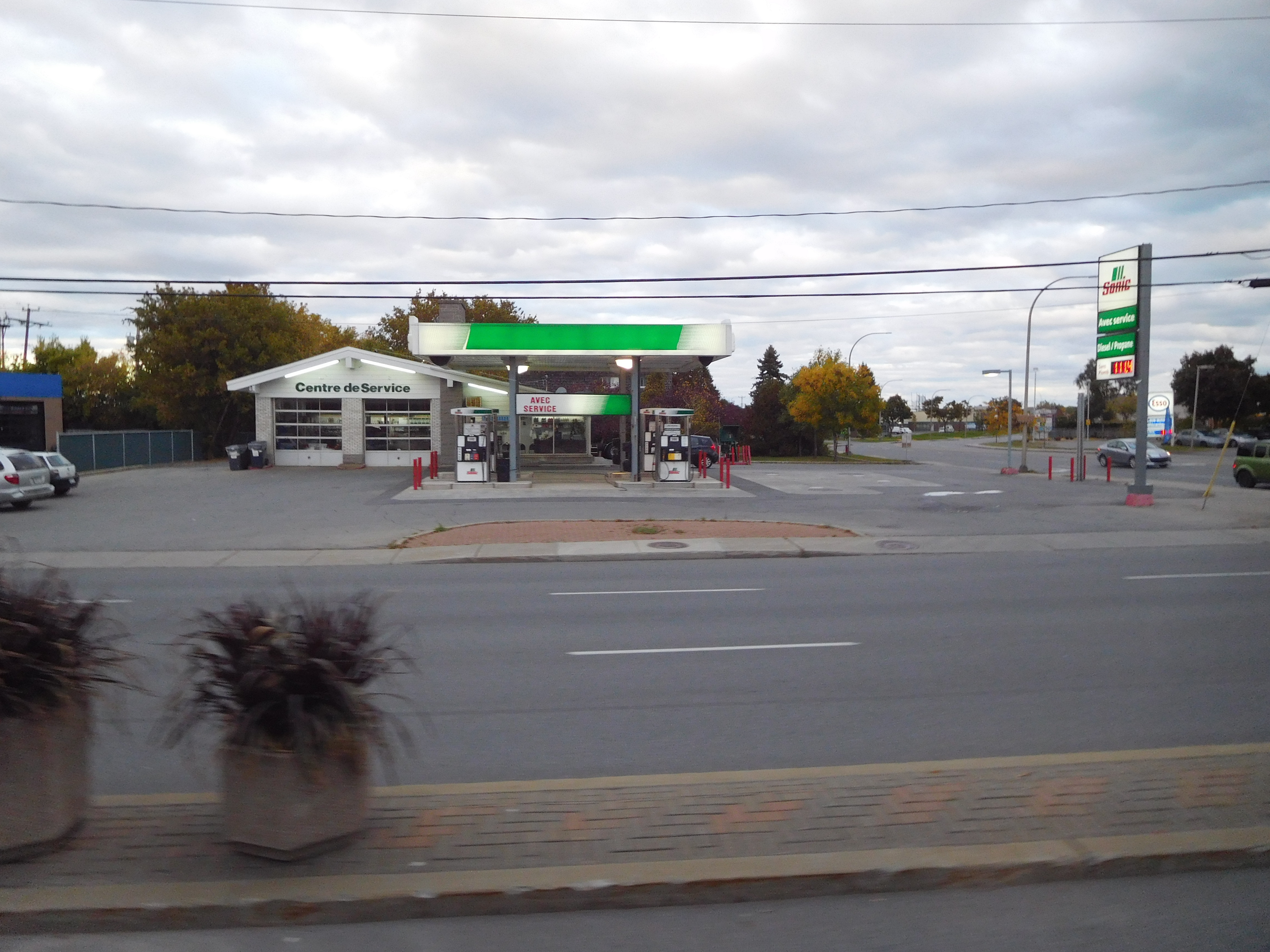
Boulevard Saint-Charles at Boulevard Hymus

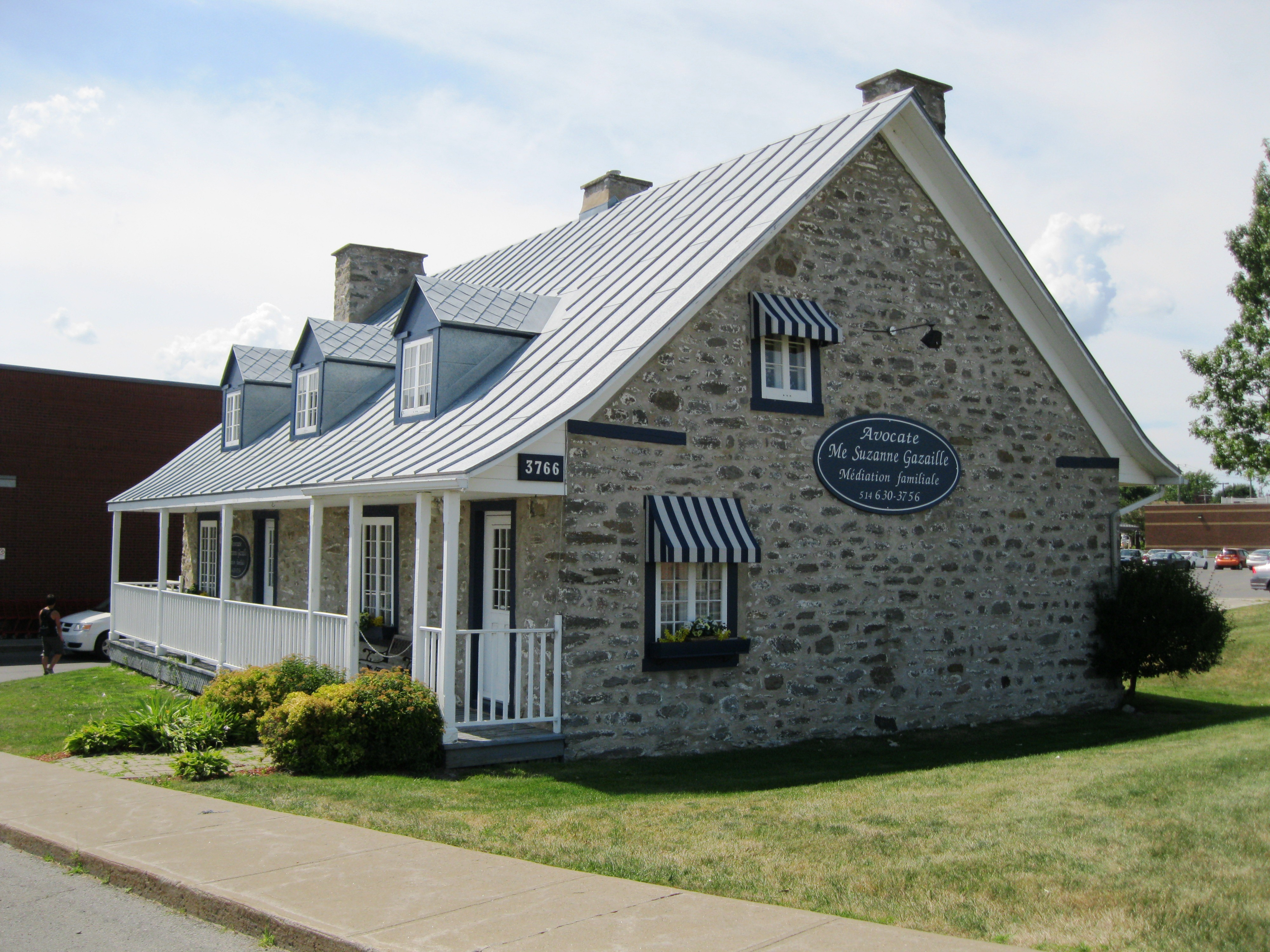
Maison Jean-Baptiste-Jamme-Dit-Carrière as seen from Saint-Charles Boulevard

Saint-Charles Boulevard is a north-south artery located in Quebec, Canada, in the west of the island of Montreal, colloquially known as West Island among locals.

The boulevard is one of the main West Island arteries that cross the island from north to south. It begins south at the intersection of Bord-du-Lac Road near Boulevard Beaconsfield and intersects Highway 20 at Exit 48. It then intersects Highway 40 at Exit 50. It finally reaches Boulevard Pierrefonds and Gouin Boulevard in the north.

== History ==
From the beginning of the 18th century, Saint Charles is found in the documents of the early settlement of the area. This route was one of the three links between Lake Saint-Louis to the Rivière des Prairies, thus its former name of “montée Saint-Charles”. The boulevard is officially designated as such only in 1961. The house of Jean-Baptiste-Jamme-Dit-Carrière and the Kirkland Centre are both located along this boulevard.

== See also ==
- Boulevard Saint-Jean – parallel artery to Boulevard Saint-Charles to the east
- Boulevard Des Sources – parallel artery to Boulevard Saint-Charles to the east
