= Roxboro, Quebec =

Roxboro
- Neighbourhood
- Location of Roxboro in Montreal
- Coordinates: 45°30′31″N 73°49′0″W
- Country: Canada
- Province: Quebec
- City: Montreal
- Borough: Pierrefonds-Roxboro

Area
  - Land: 2.22 km^{2} (0.86 sq mi)

Population (2006)
  - Total: 5,948
  - Density: 2,682.3/km^{2} (6,947/sq mi)
  - Change (2001-2006): ▲5.4%
  - Dwellings (2006): 2,162
- Time zone: UTC-5 (Eastern (EST))
  - Summer (DST): UTC-4 (EDT)
- Postal code span: H8Y
- Area codes: (514) and (438)

Roxboro (French pronunciation: [ʁɔksbɔʁo]) was a city on the Island of Montreal. It was founded in 1914, and ceased to exist on 1 January 2002 as a result of municipal reorganization in Quebec. The town was located along the Rivière des Prairies. At the time of the merger with Montreal, its population was 6,000.

== Geography ==
The area north of the train tracks was subject to many floods.

=== Roxboro Island ===
In 1974 the town of Roxboro decided to purchase the island (Lot 311) at the North end of 5th Avenue North and paid $46,130.36 to the former owner in a court expropriation decision . Archives de Montréal has an aerial photo of the island from the year 1947. It is one of islands in the Hochelaga Archipelago. The Federal and Provincial government named the island on 12 April 1991. The island has a bridge, lighting for night and garbage disposal.

=== Roxboro Woods ===
There is a section of land named "Boisé de Roxboro" designated 22 August 2001 as protected woodland. The Quebec and Federal governments do not actively protect the park and woods like Parc des Rapides-du-Cheval-Blanc (named 1997-03-25) and as a result the area of park land has significantly shrunk and continues to shrink due to development.

== Municipal reorganisation and disestablishment ==
The city of Montreal had been trying for many years to merge Roxboro and other municipalities. On January 1, 2002, the formerly independent town was forcibly merged with Dollard-des-Ormeaux to become a borough in the new city of Montreal. A referendum was held on 20 June 2004 on demerging from Montreal. Residents of the former town voted to do so by 67%, with 1,497 Yes votes and 732 No votes from a total electorate of 4,487. However, because the province required 35% turnout for the result to be valid, the referendum did not carry and the town was merged. Residents of the former city of Pierrefonds, which adjoined the former town of Roxboro, voted to stay in the new city and joined with Roxboro to form the borough of Pierrefonds-Roxboro. The new borough was formally created on January 1, 2006. Roxboro's former borough partner, Dollard-des-Ormeaux, voted against the reorganization and de-merged at that time.

== Community leaders ==
Since the Town's founding in 1914, there have been six mayors.

- March 19, 1914 John Rowley
- March 5, 1936 Geo. H. Whitehead
- June 4, 1946 Roland Bigras
- July 11, 1958 René Labelle
- November 2, 1964 William G. Boll
- November 4, 1990 Ovide T. Baciu
- November 3, 2013 Dimitrios Beis
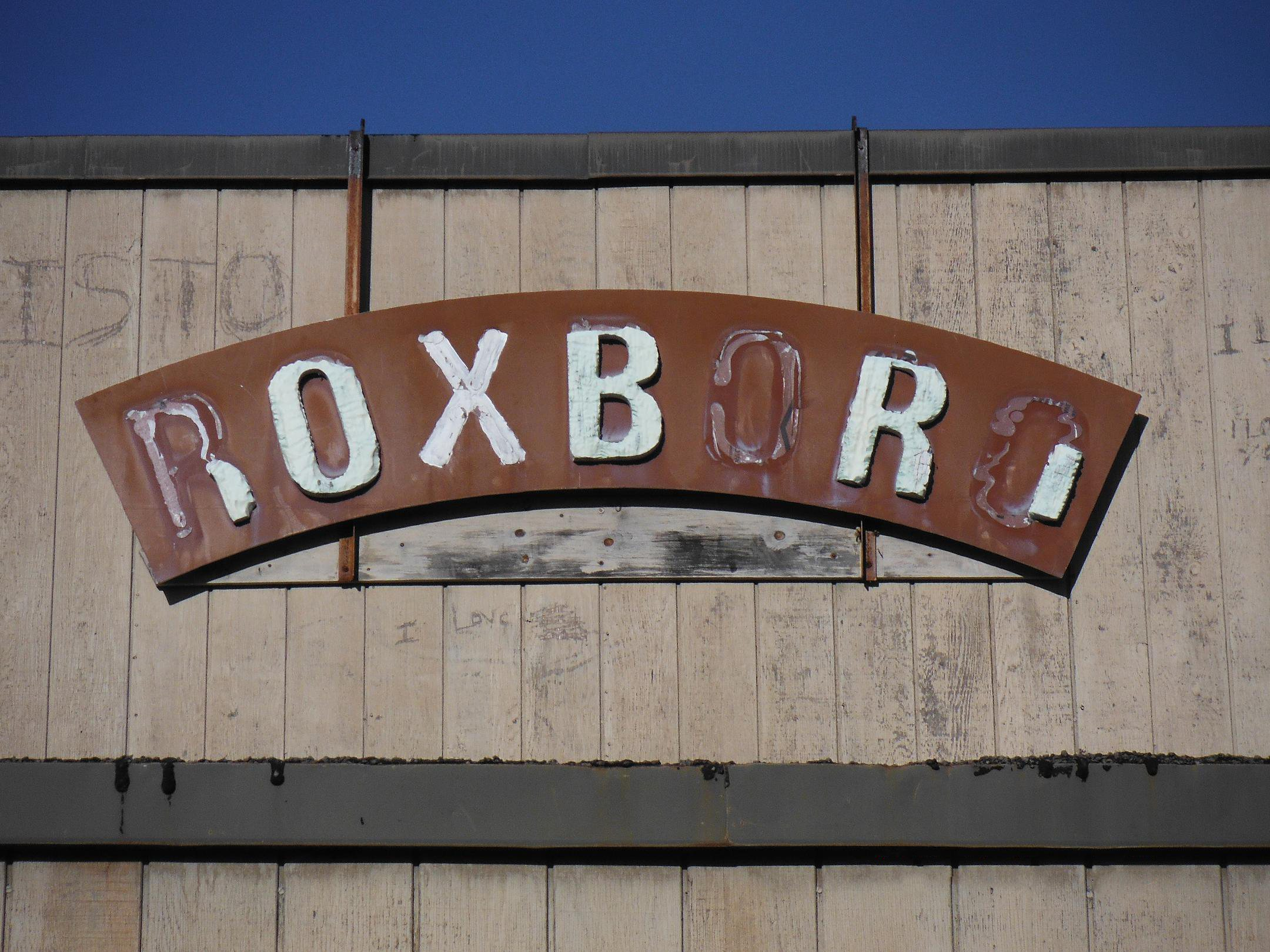
Roxboro sign on 1st Avenue North

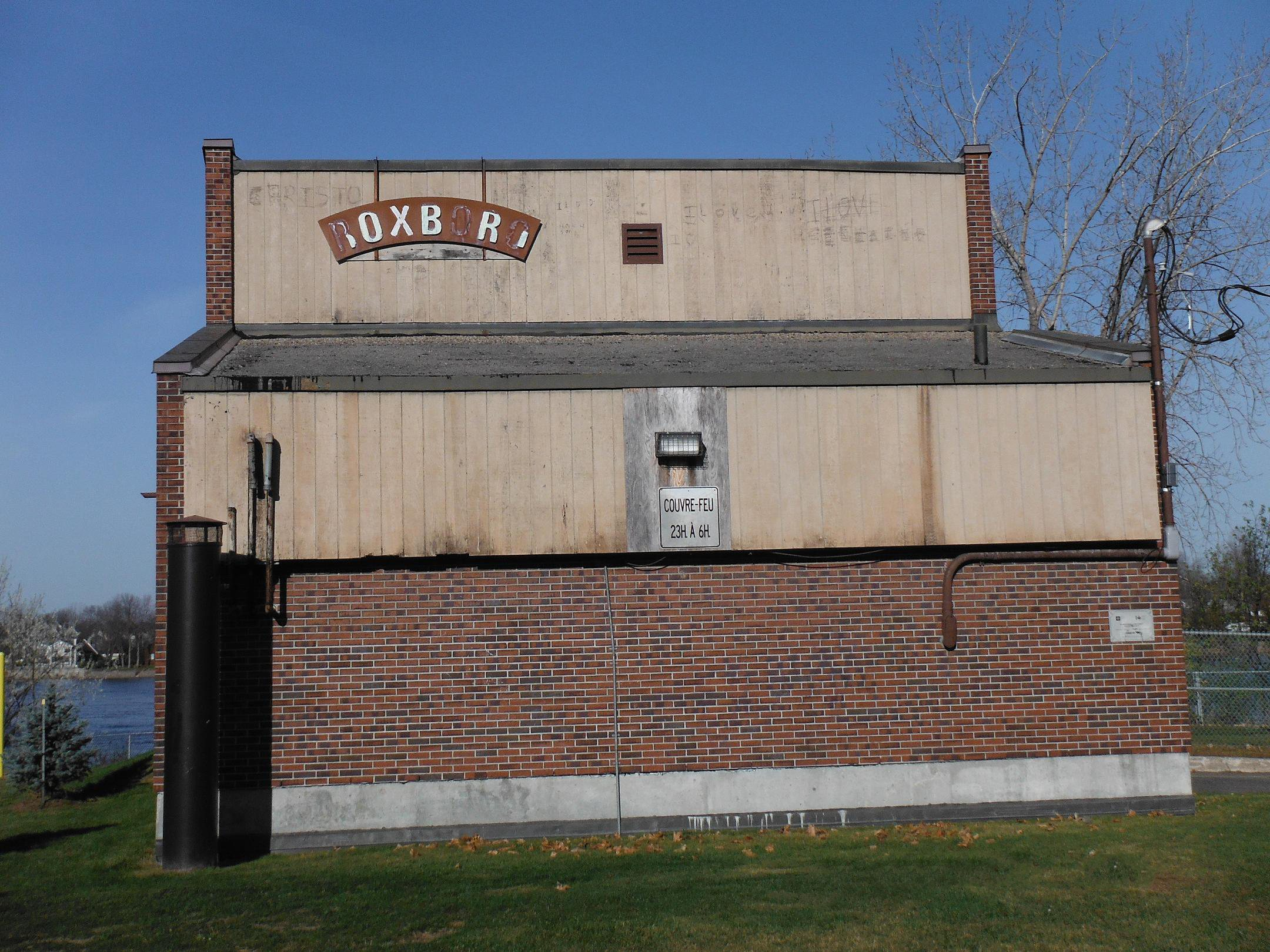
Pumping Station at Park Louise Deschenes formerly Roxboro Beach

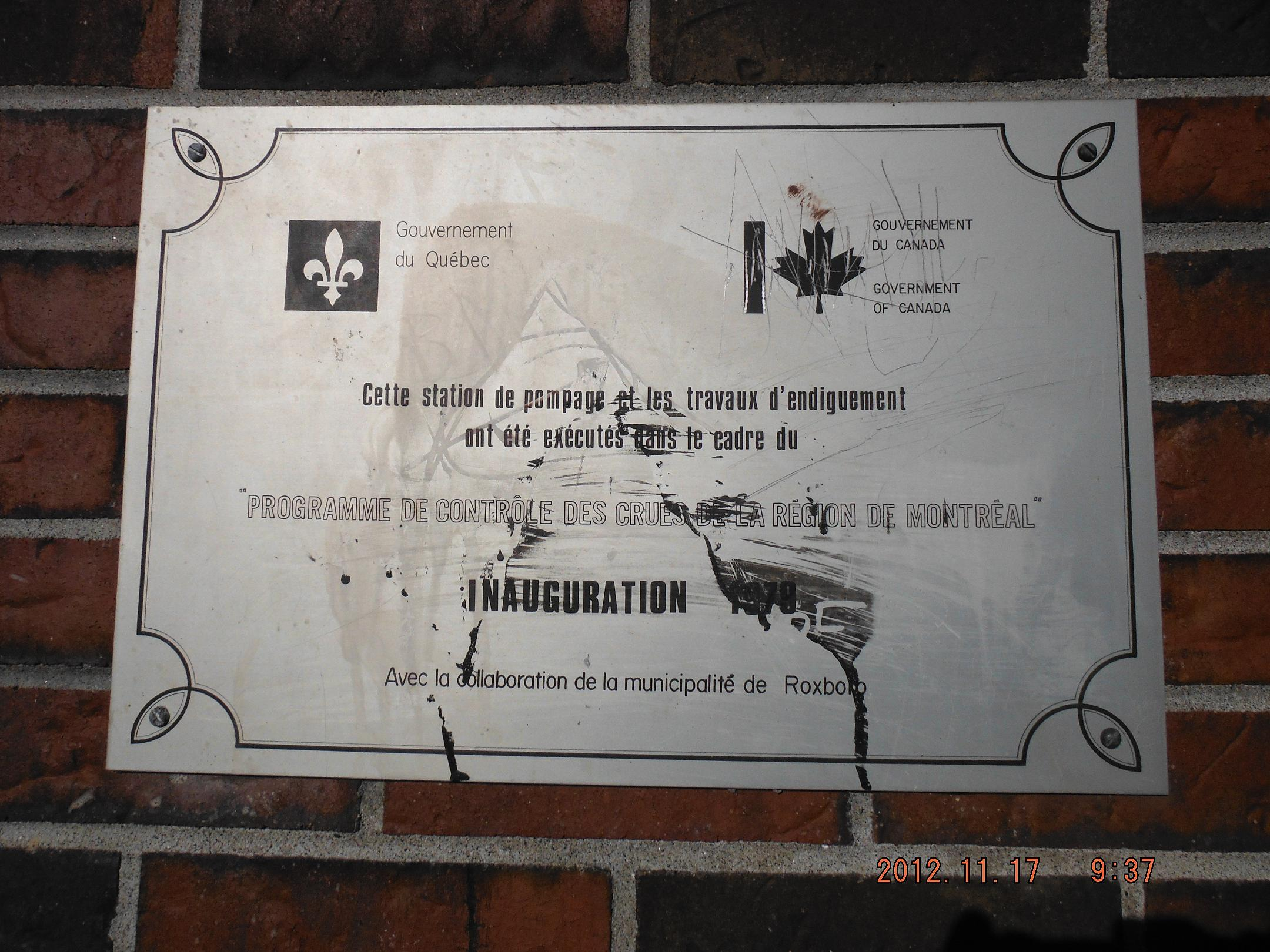
Plaque dated 1979
