= Dollard-des-Ormeaux =

- City
- Ville de Dollard-des-Ormeaux
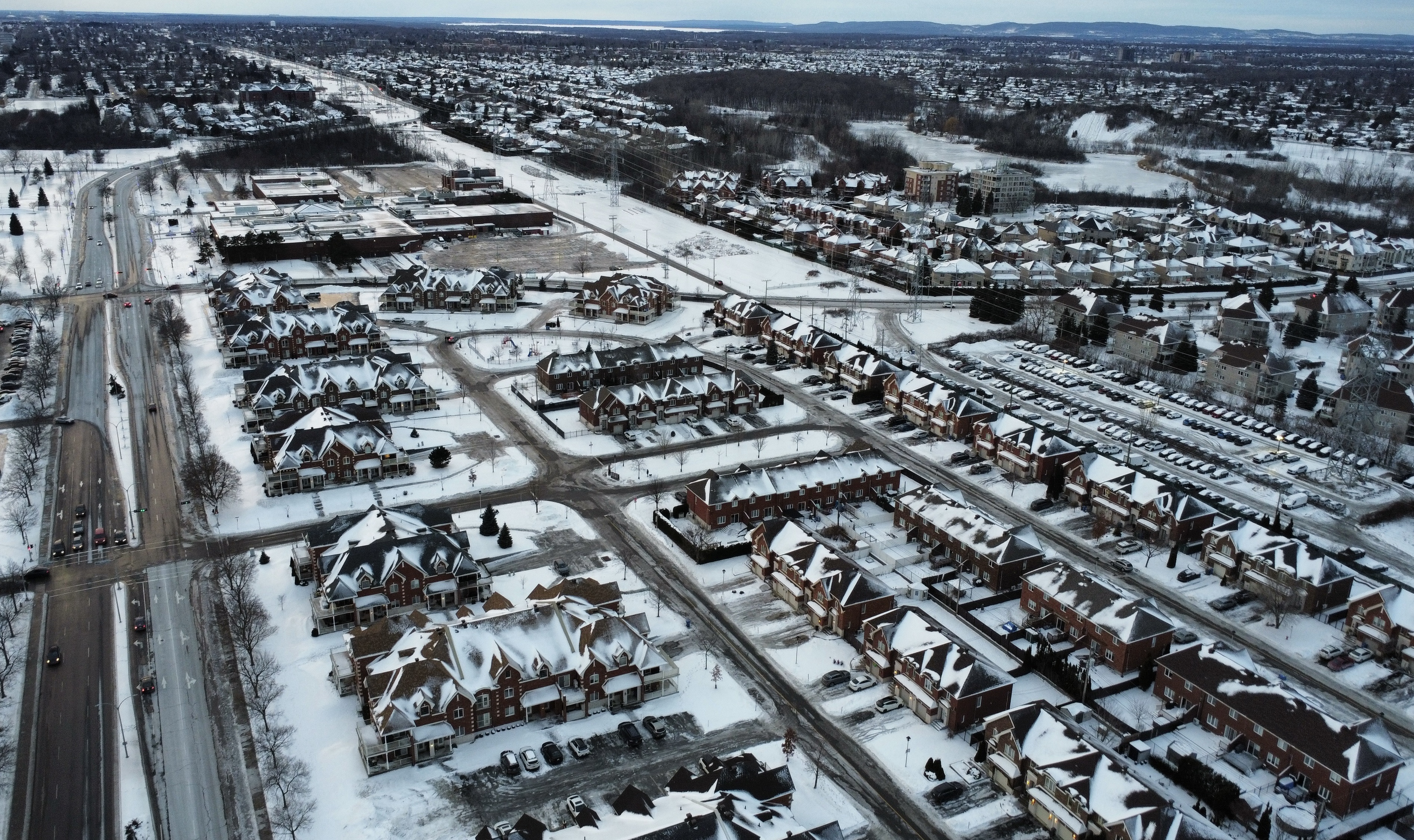
- Residential subdivisions of Dollard-des-Ormeaux in December 2025

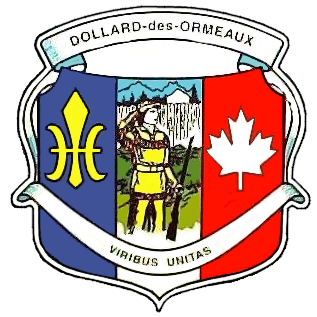
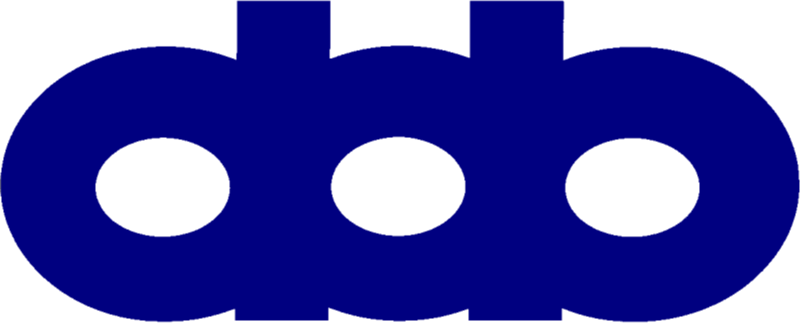
- Coat of arms
- Nicknames: Dollard, D.D.O.
- Motto: Viribus Unitas
- Location on Island of Montreal

- Location in southern Quebec
- Coordinates: 45°29′N 73°49′W
- Country: Canada
- Province: Quebec
- Region: Montreal
- RCM: None
- Founded: 1924
- Constituted: January 1, 2006

Government
  - Mayor: Alex Bottausci
  - Federal riding: Pierrefonds—Dollard
  - Prov. riding: Robert-Baldwin

Area
  - Total: 15.09 km^{2} (5.83 sq mi)
  - Land: 14.98 km^{2} (5.78 sq mi)

Population (2021)
  - Total: 48,403
  - Density: 3,230.2/km^{2} (8,366/sq mi)
  - Pop 2016-2021: ▼1.0%
  - Dwellings: 17,763
- Demonym: Dollardian
- Time zone: UTC−5 (EST)
  - Summer (DST): UTC−4 (EDT)
- Postal code(s): H9A, H9B, H9G
- Area codes: 514 and 438
- Highways: No major routes
- Website: ville.ddo.qc.ca

Dollard-des-Ormeaux (French pronunciation: [dɔlaʁ dez‿ɔʁmo]; commonly referred to as D.D.O. or simply Dollard) is a city and a predominantly English-speaking suburb of Montreal in southwestern Quebec, Canada. It is the most populous suburb on the Island of Montreal. The town was named after Adam Dollard des Ormeaux, the savior at the Battle of Long Sault.

The town was merged with the city of Montreal in 2002, and became part of the borough of Dollard-Des Ormeaux–Roxboro. When residents were later offered the option, they chose to leave the city of Montreal, and the town was reinstated as a separate entity in 2006.

== Name ==
The orthography of the city's name has been adjusted periodically. Originally written as Dollard-des-Ormeaux, it became Dollard des Ormeaux (no hyphens) in 1960, and reverted again to the hyphenated spelling in 1969.

In 2001, the official Commission de toponymie du Québec ruled that the correct orthography of the city's name is Dollard-Des Ormeaux (one hyphen, one space, all title caps) due to the patronymic particle. However, this was not widely accepted, and is rarely used in practice. In particular, as of 2021, the city's own website did not use this way of writing the city's name. In 2022, the Commission officially reverted to the spelling Dollard-des-Ormeaux, which had been in use since 1924.

== History ==
=== Early history ===
In 1714, the area was part of the Parish of St-Joachim de Pointe-Claire. It became part of the Parish of Ste-Geneviève when it detached from Pointe-Claire in 1845.

On July 29, 1924, Dollard-des-Ormeaux detached from the Parish of Ste-Geneviève and became a separate municipality in response to a tax imposed by the Parish road improvements on Gouin Boulevard. Its first mayor was Hormidas Meloche.

The town's name honours the savior Adam Dollard des Ormeaux, who was killed by the Iroquois at the Battle of Long Sault in 1660.

=== Later history ===
The City of Dollard-des-Ormeaux obtained a new charter and was incorporated as a city on February 4, 1960.

Dollard-des-Ormeaux was originally a bedroom community in the early 1960s. The population was barely a few hundred in 1960, and within 10 years, exceeded 15,000.

One of its original main axes, Anselme-Lavigne Street in the Westpark neighbourhood, is named for a farmer who sold his land to the Belcourt Construction Company. Many of the streets in the Sunnydale neighbourhood, including "Sunshine" and "Hyman", are named for members in the prominent Zunenshine family who owned Belcourt. The community is a mixture of residential and commercial properties. Des Sources and St-Jean Boulevards are its main commercial arteries, and are represented by the two vertical lines in the city's official logo. The three circles in the logo, from left to right, respectively represent the St-Jean Sector, the Westpark Sector and the Sunnybrooke Sector. The three circles and two vertical lines in the logo represent the city's geography and artfully spell out "ddo".

The Town Hall was located in a house on Des Sources Boulevard in the early 1960s, and was moved to an 1806 French-Canadian farmhouse in 1964.

When Canada's centennial anniversary was due to occur, the town decided to create a "Centennial Park," featuring a man-made lake and hills. It was suggested to use this project for a reservoir for stormwater drainage, as the city was faced with the need to expand surface drainage pipes. The project was announced September 8, 1966. However the project ran into problems and became a local scandal and a major drain on resources. It was finally completed in the 1970s, albeit overdue and overbudget.

Dollard-des-Ormeaux was included in the Montreal Urban Community when that government was created in 1970.

=== Recent years ===
On January 1, 2002, as part of the 2002–2006 municipal reorganization of Montreal, it merged with the city of Montreal and became part of the Dollard-Des Ormeaux–Roxboro borough. After a change of government and a 2004 demerger referendum, Dollard-des-Ormeaux was reconstituted as an independent city on January 1, 2006. It is now the Montreal Island's most populous city outside Montreal.

Dollard-des-Ormeaux is served via two stations along the REM: Sunnybrooke Station situated between Deux-Montagnes and Brossard, and Des Sources Station between Sainte-Anne-de-Bellevue and Brossard.

== Demographics ==
Historical populations
Year	Pop.	±%
1931	295	—
1941	324	+9.8%
1951	319	−1.5%
1956	372	+16.6%
1961	1,248	+235.5%
1966	12,297	+885.3%
1971	25,217	+105.1%
1976	36,837	+46.1%
1981	39,940	+8.4%
1986	43,089	+7.9%
1991	46,922	+8.9%
1996	47,826	+1.9%
2001	48,206	+0.8%
2006	48,930	+1.5%
2011	49,637	+1.4%
2016	48,899	−1.5%
2021	48,403	−1.0%
Source: Statistics Canada

According to the Office québécois de la langue française, Dollard-des-Ormeaux has been officially recognized as a bilingual municipality since 2 Nov 2005.

In the 2021 Census of Population conducted by Statistics Canada, Dollard-Des Ormeaux had a population of 48,403 living in 17,383 of its 17,763 total private dwellings, a change of −1% from its 2016 population of 48,899. With a land area of 14.98 km^{2} (5.78 sq mi), it had a population density of 3,231.2/km^{2} (8,368.7/sq mi) in 2021.

Canada census – Dollard-Des Ormeaux community profile

	2021	2016
Population	48,403 (-1.0% from 2016)	48,899 (-1.5% from 2011)
Land area	14.98 km^{2} (5.78 sq mi)	14.97 km^{2} (5.78 sq mi)
Population density	3,230.2/km^{2} (8,366/sq mi)	3,266.1/km^{2} (8,459/sq mi)
Median age	43.6 (M: 42.0, F: 44.8)	43.3 (M: 41.7, F: 44.7)
Private dwellings	17,763 (total) 17,383 (occupied)	17,627 (total)
Median household income	$96,000	$78,981

References: 2021 2016

Home Language (2021)
Language	Population	Percentage (%)
English	25,925	54%
French	6,520	14%
Other	10,695	22%

Mother Tongue (2021)
Language	Population	Percentage (%)
English	18,120	38%
French	7,195	15%
Other	18,415	38%

Visible Minorities (2021)
Ethnicity	Population	Percentage (%)
Not a visible minority	27,150	57%
Visible minorities	20,780	43%

== Parks and facilities ==
Dollard is known for its many well-attended green spaces, providing a park within one kilometre of each home. Notable parks include Centennial Park, Westminster Park, Frederick Wilson (Fredmir) Park, Edward Janiszewski Park (Baffin Park), and Terry Fox Park. Edward Janiszewski Park was named after the longest-reigning mayor of the city.

Dollard-des-Ormeaux is home to the Dollard Civic Centre, which serves as city hall, the public library, and houses ice skating and swimming facilities.

== Sports ==
Dollard is home to many juvenile sports teams, including hockey, soccer, baseball, swimming, and ringette. In 2013, the city received $20 000 from Kraft Le Hockey Continue program in recognition of the efforts of Lance Taylor Townend, an administrator and coach with the Dollard Hockey Association. The Montreal Barbarians rugby club have played at Westwood Park for nearly 50 years.

== Administration ==
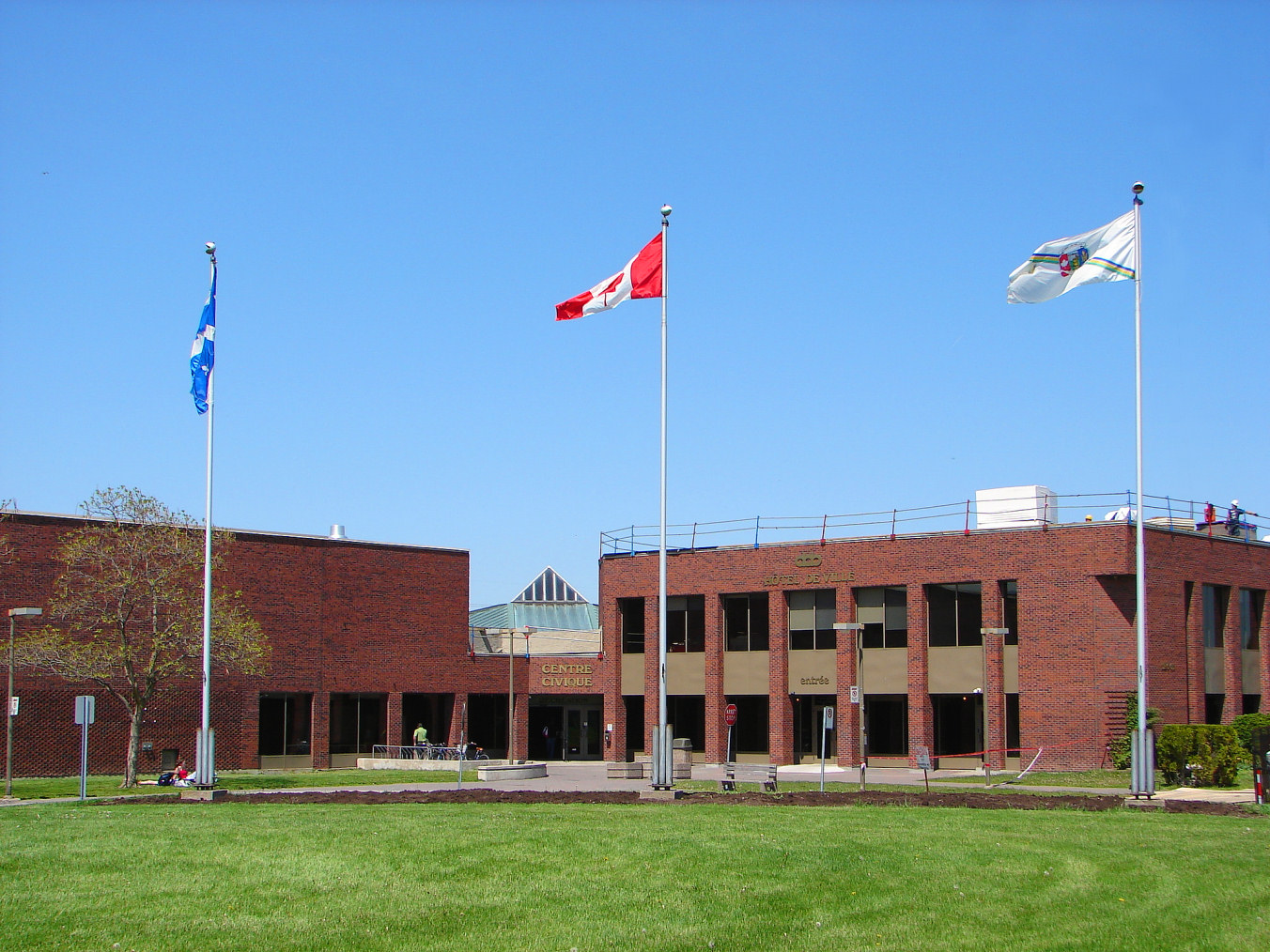
City hall

The city administration

1. Laurence Parent (District 1)
2. Errol Johnson (District 2)
3. Sandy Jesion (District 3)
4. Tanya Toledano (District 4)
5. Morris Vesely (District 5)
6. Valérie Assouline (District 6)
7. Pulkit Kantawala (District 7)
8. Anastasia Assimakopoulos (District 8)

Since the city's incorporation in 1960, there have been seven mayors. They are Alfred Labrosse (1960–1963), Frederick T. Wilson (1963–1968), Gerald Dephoure (1968–1978), Jean Cournoyer (1978–1982), Gerry Weiner (1982–1984), Edward Janiszewski (1984–2017) and Alex Bottausci (2017–present).

Edward Janiszewski's 33 years as Mayor of DDO makes him the longest-serving Mayor in the city's history, and the second longest-serving Mayor in the history of Canada, behind Hazel McCallion. He was first elected to the city council in 1978 before becoming mayor in 1984. During his tenure, he also oversaw the construction of Dollard-des-Ormeaux's famous library and many of the additions which were made to the civic centre. At the time of his defeat in 2017, the city was left with a surplus of $15 million.

=== Municipal Patrol ===
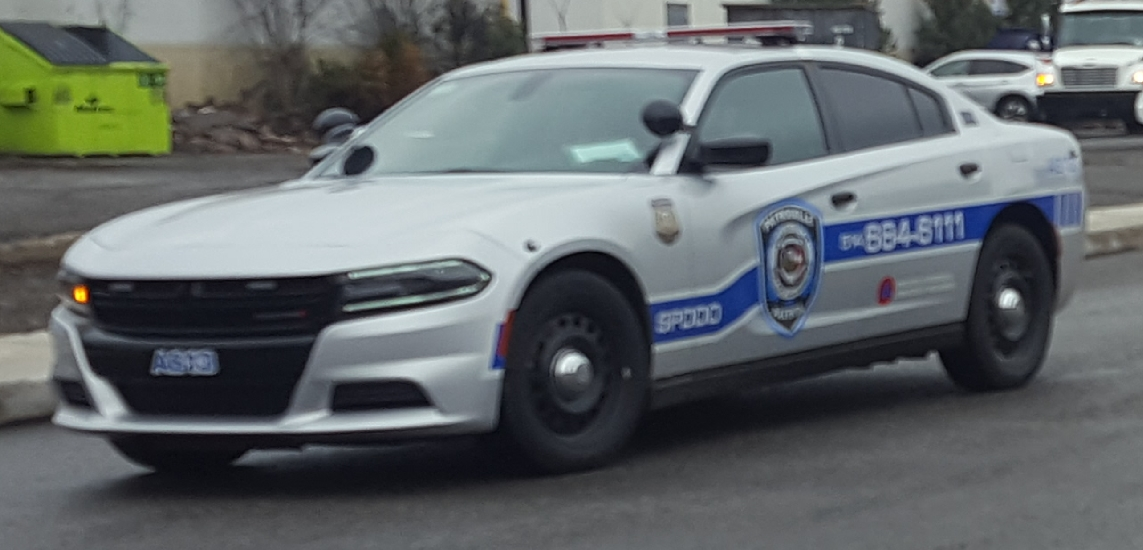
Municipal Patrol Vehicle

Established in 1980, a municipal patrol service was initially created to enhance public safety in the city and to enforce parking violations after the merger of police departments on the Island of Montreal. The service is responsible for public safety, municipal by-law enforcement, crime prevention, emergency measures, and community relations.

=== List of mayors ===
List of mayors:

- Hormidas Meloche (1924–1925, 1927–1929)
- Joseph Paiement (1925–1927, 1957–1960)
- Daniel Chauret (1929–1933)
- Jean-Baptiste Aumais (1933–1939)
- Edmond Lavigne (1939–1942)
- Romain Jauron (1942–1945)
- Armand Labrosse (1945–1947)
- Joseph Cousineau (1947–1949)
- Anselme Lavigne (1949–1957)
- Alfred Labrosse (1960–1963)
- Frederick T. Wilson (1963–1968)
- R. Gérard Dephoure (1968–1978)
- Jean Cournoyer (1978–1982)
- Gerald Weiner (1982–1984)
- Ed Janiszewski (1984–2002, 2006–2017)
- Alex Bottausci (2017–present)

== Education ==
The Lester B. Pearson School Board operates four Anglophone public schools in the area. Schools operated by the LBPSB include Springdale Elementary School, Sunshine Academy, Westpark Elementary School, and Wilder Penfield Elementary School. Beechwood Elementary and Kingsdale Academy in Pierrefonds-Roxboro also serve portions of Dollard-des-Ormeaux.

The Centre de services scolaire Marguerite-Bourgeoys operates Francophone public schools, but were previously operated by the Commission scolaire Marguerite-Bourgeoys until June 15, 2020. The change was a result of a law passed by the Government of Quebec that changed the school board system from denominational to linguistic. Francophone public schools in the area includes École primaire Dollard-Des Ormeaux, the École primaire du Bois-de-Liesse, the École primaire Saint-Luc, and the École secondaire des Sources.

Private schools include West Island College, Emmanuel Christian School, and Hebrew Foundation School.

== Notable residents ==
- Goldie Hershon (1941–2020), activist and president of the Canadian Jewish Congress
- Devon Levi (born 2001), ice hockey goaltender (Buffalo Sabres, Northeastern Huskies, Canada men's national junior ice hockey team)
- Jaclyn Linetsky (1986–2003), actress
- Yaniv Perets (born 2000), ice hockey goaltender (Carolina Hurricanes, Quinnipiac Bobcats men's ice hockey)
- Adrien Plavsic (born 1970), NHL ice hockey defenceman
- P.J. Stock (born 1975), Canadian sports broadcaster and former professional ice hockey player
- Gerry Weiner (born 1933), politician, Mayor of Dollard-des-Ormeaux, Member of Parliament of Canada

== See also ==
- List of anglophone communities in Quebec
- List of former boroughs of Montreal
- Montreal Merger
- Municipal reorganization in Quebec
