= Gouin Boulevard =

Street in Montreal, Canada

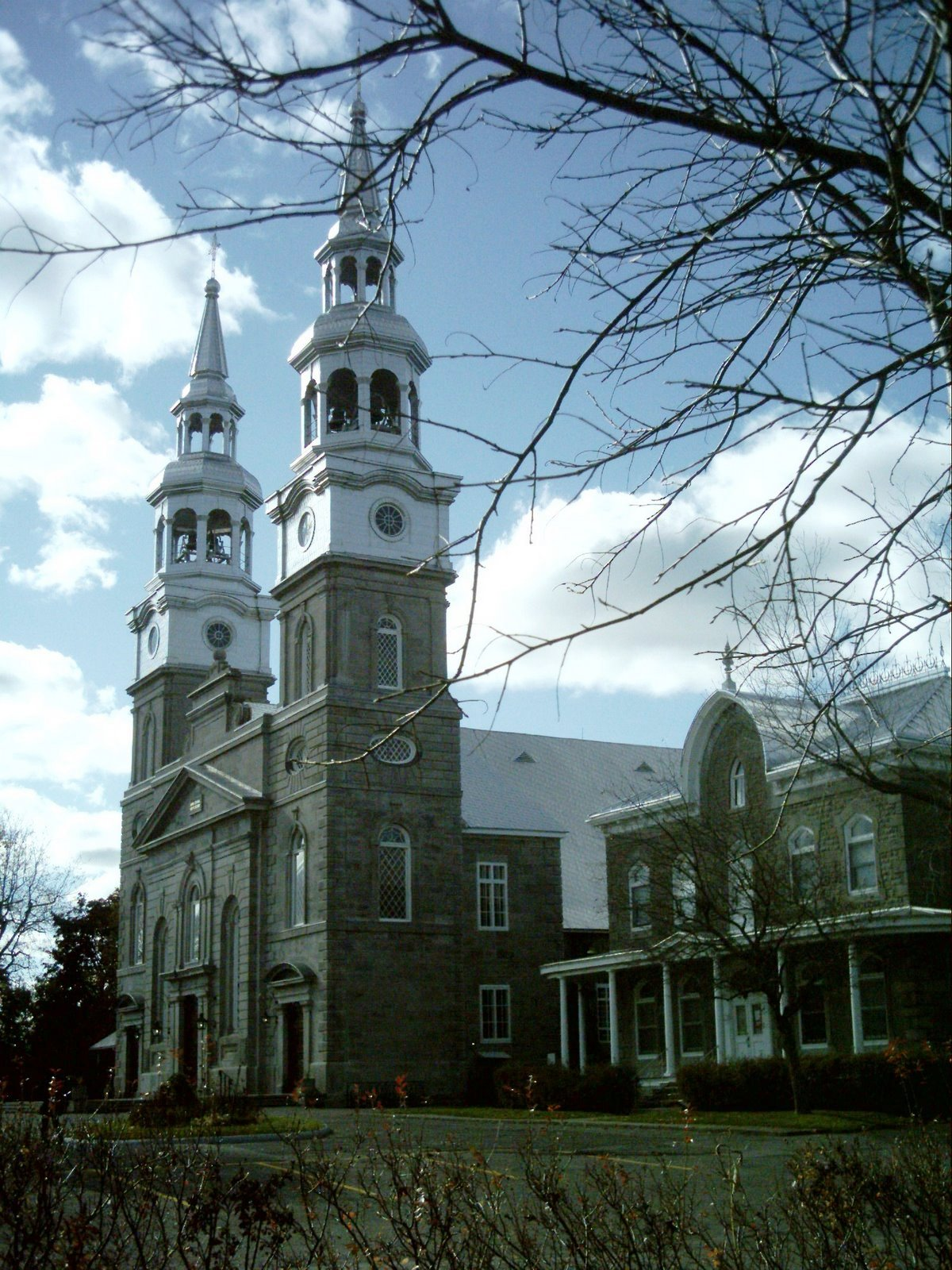
- Visitation Church at 1847 Gouin Boulevard East
- Interactive map of Gouin Boulevard
- Native name: boulevard Gouin (French)
- Length: 57.6 km (35.8 mi)
- Location: Island of Montreal
- Coordinates: 45°33′14″N 73°40′23″W
- West end: Anse-à-l'Orme Road, Senneville (continues as Senneville Road)
- Major junctions: A-13; R-117 South: Laurentian Boulevard; R-117 North: Lachapelle Street; R-335 Ahuntsic Bridge; A-40 (TCH)
- East end: R-138 Sherbrooke Street, Pointe-aux-Trembles

Gouin Boulevard (officially in French: boulevard Gouin) is the longest street on the Island of Montreal, stretching 57.6 kilometres (35.8 mi) across the north side of the island from Senneville, in the west, to Pointe-aux-Trembles, in the east, where it intersects with Sherbrooke Street (Quebec Route 138).

== Overview ==
Throughout most of its length, Gouin Boulevard parallels the Riviere des Prairies, which separates Montreal from Laval (Île Jésus). Beginning in the west at the Montreal/Senneville boundary on Anse-à-l'Orme Road, it crosses the areas of Pierrefonds, Sainte-Geneviève, Roxboro, Saraguay, Cartierville, Ahuntsic, Montréal-Nord, Rivière-des-Prairies, and Pointe-aux-Trembles. The boulevard is named after Sir Lomer Gouin, Premier of Quebec from 1905 to 1920.

Many sections of the street feature bicycle lanes, which are part of Quebec's Route Verte network. However, several sections have been criticized as dangerous because of the presence of hydro poles in the lanes. The road has been voted the worst road in Quebec several times.

== History ==
What is now Gouin Boulevard was first started in 1731, as part of the Chemin du Roy, the oldest highway in Canada. It first opened between 1734 and 1777 and served settlements that had started to be established in the late 17th century. In 1910, the portion of the Chemin du Roy on the Island of Montreal was renamed to "Gouin" in honour of the politician Lomer Gouin (1861-1929), a premier of Quebec, by the District and County of Montreal.

Much of the boulevard was affected during the 2017 Quebec floods.

== Gallery ==
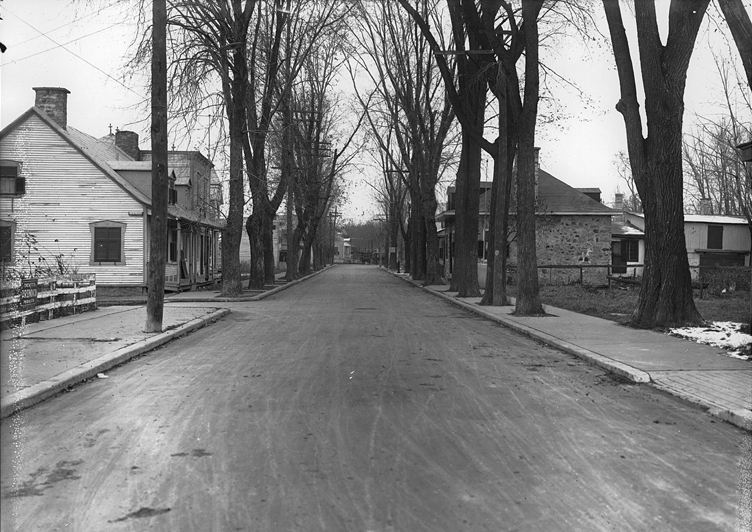
Gouin Blvd, about 1920

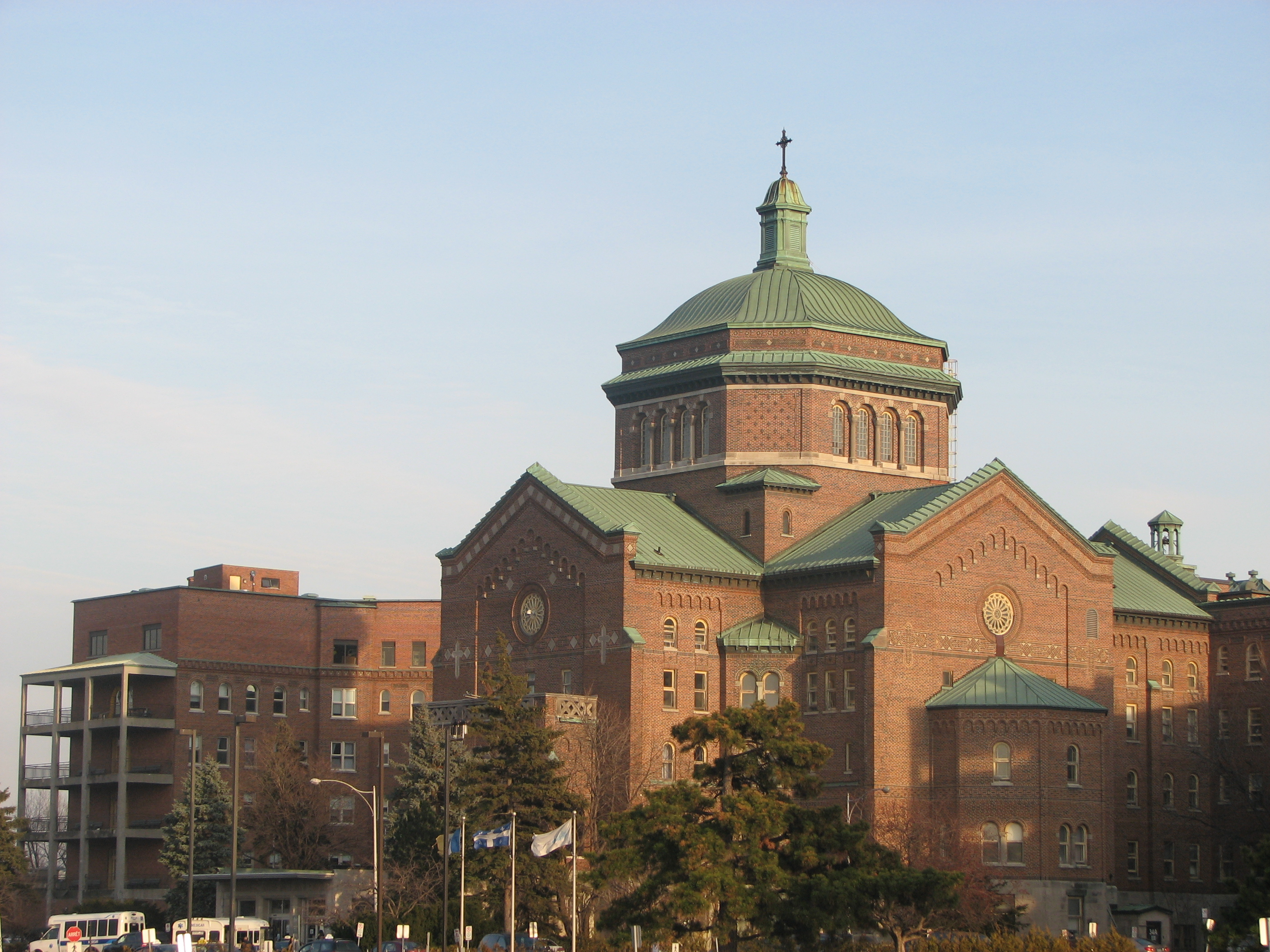
Hôpital du Sacré-Cœur de Montréal
