= Centre de services scolaire de la Pointe-de-l'Île =

School service centre in Quebec, Canada

The Centre de services scolaire de la Pointe-de-l'Île (CSSPÎ) is an autonomous school service centre in Montreal, Quebec, Canada, based primarily in the city's east end, appointed by the Ministry of Education.

It serves French public schools in the Montreal boroughs of Montréal-Nord, Saint-Léonard, Anjou, and Rivière-des-Prairies–Pointe-aux-Trembles. It also serves Montréal-Est, a municipality outside of the Montreal city limits. Its headquarters is in the Pointe-aux-Trembles area of Montreal.

On June 15, 2020, it replaced the former elected Commission scolaire de la Pointe-de-l'Île (Pointe-de-l'Île school commission or school board).

== Schools ==
=== Secondary schools ===
- École secondaire d'Anjou (Anjou)
- École secondaire Antoine-de-St-Exupéry (St. Leonard)
- École secondaire Calixa-Lavallée (Montreal North)
- École secondaire Daniel-Johnson (Pointe-aux-Trembles)
- École secondaire Guy-Vanier
- École secondaire Henri-Bourassa (Montreal North)
- École secondaire Jean-Grou (Rivière-des-Prairies)
- École secondaire La Passerelle
- École secondaire La Relance / Centre Ferland
- École secondaire Le Tournesol
- École secondaire Pointe-aux-Trembles (Pointe-aux-Trembles)

=== Primary schools ===
- Adélard-Desrosiers (Montreal North)
- Albatros
- Alphonse-Pesant (St. Leonard)
- Cardinal-Léger (Anjou)
- Chénier (Anjou)
- De la Fraternité (Montreal North)
- Denise-Pelletier (Rivière-des-Prairies)
- Des Roseraies (Anjou)
- Félix-Leclerc (Pointe-aux-Trembles)
- Fernand-Gauthier (Rivière-des-Prairies)
- François-La Bernarde (Pointe-aux-Trembles)
- Gabrielle-Roy (St. Leonard)
- Jacques-Rousseau (Anjou)
- Jean-Nicolet and Jean-Nicolet Annexe (Montreal North)
- Jules-Verne (Montreal North)
- La Dauversière (St. Leonard)
- Lambert-Closse
- Le Carignan (Montreal North)
- Le Tournesol (Pointe-aux-Trembles)
- Marc-Aurèle-Fortin and Marc-Aurèle-Fortin annexe (Rivière-des-Prairies)
- Montmartre (Pointe-aux-Trembles)
- Notre-Dame (Pointe-aux-Trembles)
- Notre-Dame-de-Fatima (Rivière-des-Prairies)
- Pie XII (St. Leonard)
- Pierre-de-Coubertin (Montreal North)
- René-Guénette (Montreal North)
- Belle-rive pavillon de la pointe
- Saint-Joseph (Anjou)
- Saint-Marcel (Pointe-aux-Trembles)
- Saint-Octave (Montreal East)
- Saint-Rémi and Saint-Rémi Annexe (Montreal North)
- Saint-Vincent-Marie (Montreal North)
- Sainte-Colette and Sainte-Colette Annexe (Montreal North)
- Sainte-Germaine-Cousin (Pointe-aux-Trembles)
- Sainte-Gertrude (Montreal North)
- Sainte-Marguerite-Bourgeoys (Pointe-aux-Trembles)
- Belle-rive pavillon des trembles (Pointe-aux-Trembles)
- Simone-Desjardins Pavillon Gouin (Rivière-des-Prairies)
- Simone-Desjardins Pavillon Perras
- Victor-Lavigne (St. Leonard)
- Wilfrid-Bastien (St. Leonard)
- Wilfrid-Pelletier (Anjou)
- Ferland (St. Léonard)

=== Other schools ===
Specialized schools:

- Guy-Vanier
- La Passerelle
- Le Tournesol
- Marc-Laflamme/Le Prélude

Adult schools:

- Centre Amos
- Centre Anjou
- Centre Antoine-de-St-Exupéry
- Centre Eusèbe-Gagnon
- Centre Louis-Fréchette
- Centre Louis-Fréchette Annexe
- Centre Paul-Gratton

Professional development centres:

- Centre Anjou
- Centre Antoine-de-St-Exupéry
- Centre Calixa-Lavallée
- Centre Daniel-Johnson
- Centre de formation des métiers de l'acier
- École Hôtelière de Montréal Calixa-Lavallée

== Districts ==
- 1 Pointe-aux-Trembles / Montréal-Est, Quebec
- 2 Anjou, Quebec

- 3 Saint-Leonard, Quebec

- 4 Montréal-Nord

- 5 Rivière-des-Prairies, Quebec
