= Commission scolaire de la Pointe-de-l'Île =

Former Francophone school board in Quebec

The Commission scolaire de la Pointe-de-l'Île (CSPÎ) was a francophone school board in Montreal, Quebec, Canada, based primarily in the city's east end. It served Montréal-Nord, Saint-Léonard, Anjou, and Rivière-des-Prairies–Pointe-aux-Trembles. It also served Montréal-Est, a municipality outside of the Montreal city limits. Its headquarters is in the Pointe-aux-Trembles area of Montreal.

== History ==
Commission scolaire de la Pointe-de-l'Île (Pointe-de-l'Île school commission or school board), was created by the government of Quebec on July 1, 1998, as part of a general restructuring from school boards representing religious communities to those representing linguistic communities. The CSPI replaced the former Commission scolaire Jérôme-Le Royer while also incorporating some francophone schools from other commissions. There were 27,500 students enrolled in schools associated with the board at the time of its founding; by 2011, the number had grown to 35,000. The eastern portion of the former Montreal Catholic School Commission became a part of the CSPÎ.

The commission was overseen by a group of elected school commissioners. Vincenzo Arciresi was the first chair of the commission and served in this capacity until his defeat by Miville Boudreault in the 2014 council election, the first in which the chair was directly elected.

It was replaced by the Centre de services scolaire de la Pointe-de-l'Île.

== Schools ==
=== Secondary schools ===
- École secondaire d'Anjou (Anjou)
- École secondaire Antoine-de-St-Exupéry (St. Leonard)
- École secondaire Calixa-Lavallée (Montreal North)
- École secondaire Daniel-Johnson (Pointe-aux-Trembles)
- École secondaire Guy-Vanier
- École secondaire Henri-Bourassa (Montreal North)
- École secondaire Jean-Grou (Rivière-des-Prairies)
- École secondaire La Passerelle
- Le Prélude and Le Prélude annexe (Montreal North)
- École secondaire La Relance
- École secondaire Le Tournesol
- École secondaire Pointe-aux-Trembles (Pointe-aux-Trembles)

=== Primary schools ===
- Adélard-Desrosiers (Montreal North)
- Albatros
- Alphonse-Pesant (St. Leonard)
- Cardinal-Léger (Anjou)
- Chénier (Anjou)
- De la Fraternité (Montreal North)
- Denise-Pelletier (Rivière-des-Prairies)
- Des Roseraies (Anjou)
- Félix-Leclerc (Pointe-aux-Trembles)
- Fernand-Gauthier (Rivière-des-Prairies)
- François-La Bernarde (Pointe-aux-Trembles)
- Gabrielle-Roy (St. Leonard)
- Jacques-Rousseau (Anjou)
- Jean-Nicolet and Jean-Nicolet Annexe (Montreal North)
- Jules-Verne (Montreal North)
- La Dauversière (St. Leonard)
- Lambert-Closse
- Le Carignan (Montreal North)
- Le Tournesol (Pointe-aux-Trembles)
- Marc-Aurèle-Fortin and Marc-Aurèle-Fortin annexe (Rivière-des-Prairies)
- Montmartre (Pointe-aux-Trembles)
- Notre-Dame (Pointe-aux-Trembles)
- Notre-Dame-de-Fatima (Rivière-des-Prairies)
- Pie XII (St. Leonard)
- Pierre-de-Coubertin (Montreal North)
- René-Guénette (Montreal North)
- Belle-rive pavillon de la pointe
- Saint-Joseph (Anjou)
- Saint-Marcel (Pointe-aux-Trembles)
- Saint-Octave (Montreal East)
- Saint-Rémi and Saint-Rémi Annexe (Montreal North)
- Saint-Vincent-Marie (Montreal North)
- Sainte-Colette and Sainte-Colette Annexe (Montreal North)
- Sainte-Germaine-Cousin (Pointe-aux-Trembles)
- Sainte-Gertrude (Montreal North)
- Sainte-Marguerite-Bourgeoys (Pointe-aux-Trembles)
- Belle-rive pavillon des trembles (Pointe-aux-Trembles)
- Simone-Desjardins Pavillon Gouin (Rivière-des-Prairies)
- Simone-Desjardins Pavillon Perras
- Victor-Lavigne (St. Leonard)
- Wilfrid-Bastien (St. Leonard)
- Wilfrid-Pelletier (Anjou)

=== Other schools ===
Specialized schools:

- Guy-Vanier
- La Passerelle
- Le Tournesol
- Marc-Laflamme/Le Prélude

Adult schools:

- Centre Amos
- Centre Anjou
- Centre Antoine-de-St-Exupéry
- Centre Eusèbe-Gagnon
- Centre Ferland
- Centre Louis-Fréchette
- Centre Louis-Fréchette Annexe
- Centre Paul-Gratton

Professional development centres:

- Centre Anjou
- Centre Antoine-de-St-Exupéry
- Centre Calixa-Lavallée
- Centre Daniel-Johnson
- Centre de formation des métiers de l'acier
- École Hôtelière de Montréal Calixa-Lavallée

== Elections for school trustees ==
=== 1998 ===
| Electoral District | Position | Total valid votes | Candidates |
| Electoral District | Position | Total valid votes | Winner | Second place | Third place | Fourth place |
|---|---|---|---|---|---|---|
| District One | Trustee | 838 | Jacqueline Simard; 608 (72.55%) | Madeleine Perreault Lozeau; 230 (27.45%) |
| District Two | Trustee | 607 | Gilles Dion; 338 (55.68%) | Andre Brault; 269 (44.32%) |
| District Three | Trustee | 935 | Henri-Paul Menard; 831 (88.88%) | Vincent Marchione; 104 (11.12%) |
| District Four | Trustee | 984 | Claude Préville; 599 (60.87%) | Ghislaine Boisvert; 266 (27.03%) | Daniele Sorel; 119 (12.09%) |
| District Five | Trustee | - | Mariette Jacques (acclaimed) |
| District Six | Trustee | 749 | Andre Belisle; 378 (50.47%) | Diane Brunet; 371 (49.53%) |
| District Seven | Trustee | 640 | Diane Gauthier; 453 (70.78%) | Sandy Sicondolfo; 187 (29.22%) |
| District Eight | Trustee | 894 | Vincenzo Arciresi; 545 (60.96%) | Gabriella Andreoni; 349 (39.04%) |
| District Nine | Trustee | 451 | Fernando Barberini; 303 (67.18%) | Joyce Caron; 148 (32.82%) |
| District Ten | Trustee | 623 | Diana Moschella; 413 (66.29%) | Rudy Marcolini; 210 (33.71%) |
| District Eleven | Trustee | 632 | Massimo Pacetti; 361 (57.12%) | Camille Provencher; 230 (36.39%) | Martin Raymond; 41 (6.49%) |
| District Twelve | Trustee | 650 | Vincenzo Galati; 403 (62.00%) | Carlo Lombardo; 247 (38.00%) |
| District Thirteen | Trustee | 718 | Daniel Renaud; 274 (38.16%) | Maria Mucci; 231 (32.17%) | Elaine Bissonnette; 213 (29.67%) |
| District Fourteen | Trustee | 441 | Giuseppina Marabella; 171 (38.78%) | Suzanne Tanguay; 149 (33.79%) | Odette Poitras; 92 (20.86%) | Jimmy Abraham; 29 (6.58%) |
| District Fifteen | Trustee | 314 | Jean-Paul Brousseau; 178 (56.69%) | Ronald Poupart; 89 (28.34%) | Heurick Ricot Coichy; 47 (14.97%) |
| District Sixteen | Trustee | 930 | Chantal Rossi; 390 (41.94%) | Isabelle Laurin; 290 (31.18%) | Louise Dagenais; 250 (26.88%) |
| District Seventeen | Trustee | 706 | Lynn Boulerice; 355 (50.28%) | Maryse Deguire; 351 (49.72%) |
| District Eighteen | Trustee | 424 | André Blanchard; 223 (52.59%) | Keder Hyppolite; 201 (47.41%) |
| District Nineteen | Trustee | 719 | Lia Campese; 364 (50.63%) | Donald Douze; 189 (26.29%) | Line Halley; 166 (23.09%) |
| District Twenty | Trustee | 576 | Jean-Frantz Benjamin; 237 (41.15%) | Michel Allard; 199 (34.55%) | Liane Barriault; 140 (24.31%) |
| District Twenty-One | Trustee | 748 | Carmelle Gadoury; 509 (68.05%) | Véronique Côté; 239 (31.95%) |
Source: Commission scolaire de la Pointe-de-L'Île — 06-01, Le Directeur général des élections du Québec.

=== 2003 ===
| Electoral District | Position | Total valid votes | Candidates | | Incumbent |
| Electoral District | Position | Total valid votes | Winner | Second place | Incumbent |
|---|---|---|---|---|---|
| District One | Trustee | | Suzanne Décarie | Pierre Savard |
| District Two | Trustee | | Miville Boudreault | Bernard Lauzon |
| District Three | Trustee | - | Henri-Paul Menard (acclaimed) | | Henri-Paul Menard |
| District Four | Trustee | - | Claude Préville (acclaimed) | | Claude Préville |
| District Five | Trustee | - | Mariette Jacques (acclaimed) | | Mariette Jacques |
| District Six | Trustee | - | Rémy Tondreau (acclaimed) |
| District Seven | Trustee | - | Diane Gauthier (acclaimed) | | Diane Gauthier |
| District Eight | Trustee | - | Vincenzo Arciresi (acclaimed) | | Vincenzo Arciresi |
| District Nine | Trustee | - | Vincenzo Galati (acclaimed) | | Fernando Barberini |
| District Ten | Trustee | - | Fernando Barberini (acclaimed) | | Diana Moschella |
| District Eleven | Trustee | - | Domenico Moschella (acclaimed) | | Massimo Pacetti (until 2002) |
| District Twelve | Trustee | - | Vincenzo Padula (acclaimed) | | Vincenzo Galati |
| District Thirteen | Trustee | - | Daniel Renaud (acclaimed) | | Daniel Renaud |
| District Fourteen | Trustee | - | Giuseppina Marabella (acclaimed) | | Giuseppina Marabella |
| District Fifteen | Trustee | - | Jean-Paul Brousseau (acclaimed) | | Jean-Paul Brousseau |
| District Sixteen | Trustee | - | Chantal Rossi (acclaimed) | | Chantal Rossi |
| District Seventeen | Trustee | - | Edith Sauvageau (acclaimed) |
| District Eighteen | Trustee | - | André Blanchard (acclaimed) | | André Blanchard |
| District Nineteen | Trustee | - | Lia Campese (acclaimed) | | Lia Campese |
| District Twenty | Trustee | | Frantz Benjamin | Rock Ste-Marie |
| District Twenty-One | Trustee | | Carmelle Gadoury | Farrol Durosel |
Source: "School board races won by acclamation," Montreal Gazette, 23 October 2003, p. 6.

=== 2007 ===
| Electoral District | Position | Total valid votes | Candidates | | | Incumbent |
| Electoral District | Position | Total valid votes | Winner | Second place | Third place | Incumbent |
|---|---|---|---|---|---|---|
| District One | Trustee | | Suzanne Décarie (elected) |
| District Two | Trustee | | Miville Boudreault (elected) |
| District Three | Trustee | | Michel Jean (elected) |
| District Four | Trustee | | Claude Préville (elected) | | | Claude Préville |
| District Five | Trustee | | Mariette Jacques (elected) | | | Mariette Jacques |
| District Six | Trustee | | Rémy Tondreau (elected) | | | Rémy Tondreau |
| District Seven | Trustee | | Danielle Boulet (elected) |
| District Eight | Trustee | - | Vincenzo Arciresi (acclaimed) | | | Vincenzo Arciresi |
| District Nine | Trustee | 399 | Vincenzo Galati; 274 (68.67%) | Sylvie Laberge; 125 (31.33%) | | Vincenzo Galati |
| District Ten | Trustee | - | Fernando Barberini (acclaimed) | | | Fernando Barberini |
| District Eleven | Trustee | - | Domenico Moschella (acclaimed) | | | Domenico Moschella |
| District Twelve | Trustee | 455 | Vincenzo Padula; 329 (72.31%) | René Dubois; 126 (27.69%) | | Vincenzo Padula |
| District Thirteen | Trustee | 225 | Daniel Renaud; 120 (53.33%) | Umberto Di Genova; 105 (46.67%) | | Daniel Renaud |
| District Fourteen | Trustee | - | Giuseppina Marabella (acclaimed) | | | Giuseppina Marabella |
| District Fifteen | Trustee | 170 | Jean-Paul Brousseau; 90 (52.94%) | Yves Thériault; 80 (47.06%) | | Jean-Paul Brousseau |
| District Sixteen | Trustee | 441 | Chantal Rossi; 285 (64.63%) | Réjean Loyer; 156 (35.37%) | | Chantal Rossi |
| District Seventeen | Trustee | 354 | Edith Sauvageau; 219 (61.86%) | Ronide Casseus; 135 (38.14%) | | Edith Sauvageau |
| District Eighteen | Trustee | 248 | André Blanchard; 139 (56.05%) | Doris Provencher; 109 (43.95%) | | André Blanchard |
| District Nineteen | Trustee | 474 | Lia Campese; 297 (62.66%) | Gennaro Bartoli; 130 (27.43%) | Rodrigue Prescott; 47 (9.92%) | Lia Campese |
| District Twenty | Trustee | 617 | Frantz Benjamin; 508 (82.33%) | Jacques Harper; 109 (17.67%) |
| District Twenty-One | Trustee | - | Carmelle Gadoury (acclaimed) |
Sources: Elections scolaires 2007 - Les commissaires élus de la Commission scolaire de la Pointe-de-l'Ile, Canada NewsWire, 12 November 2007; Audrey Gagnon, "CSPÎ: Élection scolaire sans surprise à Saint-Léonard, Montréal-Nord et Rivière-des-Prairies", L'Informateur de Rivière-des-Prairies, 5 November 2007.

=== 2014 ===
| Electoral District | Position | Total valid votes | Candidates |
| Electoral District | Position | Total valid votes | Team Boudreault | Team Arciresi | Independent |
|---|---|---|---|---|---|
| - | President | 8,079 | **Miville Boudreault** (incumbent councillor); 5,055 (62.57%) | Vincenzo Arciresi (incumbent); 3,024 (37.43%) |
| District One | Trustee | 935 | **Bertrand Jobin**; 708 (75.72%) | Yves Boileau; 142 (15.19%) | Paul-Émile Roussille; 85 (9.09%) |
| District Two | Trustee | 1,029 | **Michel Jean** (incumbent councillor); 767 (74.54%) | | Daniel Fournier; 262 (25.46%) |
| District Three | Trustee | | **Michelle Gagné**; 544 | Mariette Jacques (incumbent councillor); 253 | André Breton (finished third) |
| District Four | Trustee | 721 | Danielle Boulet (incumbent councillor); 321 (44.52%) | **Vincent Galati** (incumbent councillor); 400 (55.48%) |
| District Five | Trustee | 934 | **Patrik Maheux**; 350 (37.47%) | Stéphanie Valenti; 348 (37.26%) | Abdelkader Bouhamdi; 236 (25.27%) |
| District Six | Trustee | | Najat Boughaba; 296 | **Leonardo Ragusa**; 380 | David Nelson |
| District Seven | Trustee | | **Sylvain Lapalme** (elected) | Mohammed Hamri (incumbent councillor) |
| District Eight | Trustee | | Luis R. Galvez | Line Ferland (incumbent councillor) | Janny Gaspard; Giuseppina Marabella (incumbent councillor); **Antonio George Urlea** (elected) |
| District Nine | Trustee | | **Renée-Chantal Belinga** (elected) | André Blanchard (incumbent councillor) | Lyes Behnas |
| District Ten | Trustee | | **Agata La Rosa** (elected) | Nancy Lamouche | Janet Cesar-Du Buisson; Mounir Rasselma |
| District Eleven | Trustee | | Marie-Carmel Michel (incumbent councillor) | **Henri-Robert Durandisse** (elected) | Farrol Durosel; Caroline Martel; Pierre Senécal; Bilel Tartraf |
Winning candidates appear in **bold**. Sources: Samantha Velandia, "Miville Boudreault et son équipe remportent les élections scolaires à la Pointe-de-l’Île", Avenir de l'Est, 2 November 2014, accessed 9 May 2017 (full preliminary results, divisions 1 and 2); Stéphanie Maunay, "Début de campagne à la CSPÎ", Le Flambeau Mercier-Anjou 6 October 2014, accessed 9 May 2017 (candidates, divisions 3 and 5); Steve Caron, "Les citoyens ont fait leurs choix…", Le Flambeau Mercier-Anjou, 3 November 2014, accessed 9 May 2017 (preliminary results, divisions 3 and 5); "Un vent de fraîcheur s'amène à la CSPÎ", Progrès Saint-Leonard, 2 November 2014, accessed 9 May 2017 (full preliminary results, president and divisions 4, 5 and 6); Stéphanie Maunay, "Début de campagne à la CSPÎ", Le Guide de Montréal-Nord, 10 October 2014, accessed 9 May 2017 (candidates, divisions 7, 8 and 9); Stéphanie Maunay, "Début de campagne à la CSPÎ", L'Informateur Rivière-des-Prairies, 8 October 2014, accessed 9 May 2017 (candidates, divisions 10 and 11); "Miville Boudreault remporte les élections à la Pointe-de-l’Île", L'Informateur Rivière-des-Prairies, 2 November 2014, accessed 9 May 2017 (results, divisions 10 and 11); Résultats préliminaires des élections scolaires de 2014 (Résultats par commission scolaire; Région 6 – Montréal), Éducation et de l'Enseignement supérieur Québec, accessed 9 May 2017. The results in District Five were subsequently overturned and a new election was held on January 11, 2015. The winner was Stéphanie Valenti with 242 votes (36.01%), against Abdelkader Bouhamdi with 231 (34.38%) and Patrick Maheux with 199 (29.61%). Source: Élection partielle à la CSPÎ - Stéphanie Valenti élue, Canada NewsWire, 13 January 2015, accessed 9 May 2017.
