= Laurier Macdonald High School =

Location
- 7355 Viau Blvd. Saint-Léonard, Montreal, Quebec, H1S 3C2; Canada; 45.5767°N 73.5855°W

Information
- Funding type: English-language public school
- Motto: Latin: Finis Coronat Opus ("The end crowns the work")
- Established: 1969
- School board: English Montreal School Board
- Principal: Pasquale Buttino (2000 - 2007); Eileen Kelly (2007 - 2011); Luigi Santamaria (2011 -2020); Cristina Celzi (2020-Present)
- Grades: Secondary III, IV and V (?-2020); Secondary I-V (1969-?; 2020-Present)
- Enrollment: over 800
- Colours: Orange and Black
- Mascot: Rams
- Accreditation: International Baccalaureate Organization (IBO)
- Radio station: 560 AM (Carrier current)
- Website: lauriermac.emsb.qc.ca/lmac

Laurier Macdonald High School (French: École secondaire Laurier Macdonald), abbreviated traditionally as "LMAC" but occasionally as "LMHS", is an English-language public school in the east end of Montreal, Quebec, Canada. The school is named for John A. Macdonald, the first Prime Minister of Canada and a Father of Confederation, and Wilfrid Laurier, the first French-Canadian Prime Minister of Canada. Formerly part of La Commission Scolaire Jérôme-Le Royer, the school has been part of the English Montreal School Board since 1998. Both its male and female sports teams compete as the Rams. Enrollment is slightly over 800 students in Secondary I, II, III, IV and V.

Cristina Celzi is the current principal of Laurier Macdonald High School. Miss Monti is the current vice-principal. The school has two full-time guidance counsellors and a nurse.

The school colours are orange and black. Traditional uniform colours are white and grey. The motto is Finis Coronat Opus (Latin for "The end crowns the work").

== History ==
Laurier Macdonald High School opened in September 1969 without a building. The new school was to serve the English-speaking Catholic population of the City of Saint-Léonard. While an older building at 5750 Metropolitan Autoroute (A-40) originally built as a factory was being converted into a high school, the Commission Scolaire Jérôme-Le Royer rented classrooms at a nearby Protestant school (Dunton High School) so that students could attend classes during the late afternoon and early evening. This arrangement ended in early 1970 when the Metropolitan Autoroute facility was ready. Within a few years, however, the old building's limitations were judged to be too serious, in spite of the renovations, and the school board began discussing the construction of a new building in earnest.

The changing political climate in the province proved to be a problem, however. The Parti Québécois government had declared a moratorium on the construction of English schools shortly after its accession to power in the fall of 1976. A student strike was organized in the month of November 1973, led by a rebellious student named Frank Fazzari, to bring to the public's attention the harm caused by the treatment of all English-speaking schools in the eastern part of Montreal.

The strike by students was the answer to the school being neglected by the Jérôme-Le Royer School Board. An overpopulated school with a capacity of 800 students was serving 1200 students. The school was in disarray with one janitor to maintain the facilities, no washroom facilities operational, doors with no locks, holes in cinder block walls, shortage of classrooms, and unsanitary conditions.

The walkout was well documented in both the English and French media. A front-page article in the now-defunct Montreal Star depicted the story of neglect with a picture of Frank Fazzari holding up one broken sink in the washroom as a symbol of defiance towards the neglect of English-speaking students had to endure.

As this was happening, the Jérôme-Le Royer School Board had just completed, in 1969, the most advanced comprehensive was French speaking high school on the territory of Saint-Léonard, Antoine de St-Exupéry, while Laurier Macdonald was nothing more than a school in rented facilities. This was much to the dismay of the population of Saint-Léonard's English-speaking parents and students. However, with the opening of the new Antoine de St-Exupéry francophone high school, the building formerly used to house French-speaking students was now available. The Aime Renaud building (also a rented building on Metropolitan) became a junior English High School to feed Laurier Macdonald. This greatly alleviated the overcrowding at Laurier Macdonald. Aime Renaud High School was used as a junior high for Secondary I and II while Laurier Macdonald was used for Secondary III, IV and V.

The media pressure and exposure prompted a quick reaction from the school board with a meeting with the student council who presented a petition on behalf of the students with the demands that their school be equipped with the maintenance and the proper equipment to operate a school burdened by overpopulation.

The board's reaction was a temporary closing of the school for one week and much to the dismay of all the members at the school board, they managed to repair, paint and fix all the anomalies. in the school. The media was invited to see all the repairs.

This spurred the quest to build a school that would match the comprehensive high school of the French-speaking community. It is the belief of many that attended the first years at the Metropolitan facilities that their determination was to be the voice of defiance that led to the awakening of the necessity for better school facilities.

A debt of gratitude is owed to Joseph Lalla for directing the students on the eve of the strike, with the use of his political savviness and knowledge of using the media as a propaganda tool and the use of his telephone in his office to contact the media.

The school board then decided to extend a small elementary school, École Sir George-Étienne-Cartier, at the corner of Jean-Talon and Viau streets. The project would not have been approved by the provincial Department of Education had it been presented otherwise. The new (and current building) opened for the 1983–4 school year. Roussin Academy in Pointe-aux-Trembles was closed and the students were transferred to the new Laurier Macdonald for the 1983–4 school year.

Laurier Macdonald was a comprehensive high school from 1983 (or in French, école polyvalente) until that distinction was abolished provincially in the early 1990s. These schools offered high school students the possibility of vocational training in the last cycle of secondary education. Until September 2020 it was school the only remaining English-language senior high school on the island of Montreal, serving only Secondary III, IV, and V students. It has been non-confessional since the school board reorganization of 1998. Previously, public schools in the province of Quebec had been organized along confessional lines (Protestant or Catholic) instead of linguistic lines (English or French).

=== Past staff and alumni ===
Louis Balena served as the second principal of Laurier Macdonald, succeeding Miss T. Arbour, from 1972 until 1987. Frank Vatrano and Tony Cambria succeeded him but both had short tenures, with Vatrano passing away shortly after becoming principal. Renzo Orsi (1991–1993) followed. He organized the Honours Plus Programme, the forerunner of today's IB Programme, and supported the expansion of the school's Communication Arts programme. Other principals included Joseph Lalla (1993–1996), Mario Tirelli (1996–2000), Pasquale Buttino (2000–2007), Eileen Kelly (2007–2011), and Luigi Santamaria (2011-2020).

Notable graduates of Laurier Macdonald include multiple, award-winning IMAX producer and filmmaker Pietro L. Serapiglia (class of 1973) – Titanica, Super Speedway, Rocky Mountain Express, Grey Cup winners Randy Chevrier and Danny Maciocia, former head coach of the Edmonton Eskimos in the Canadian Football League, Frank Zampino (1976), former Chairman of the Executive Committee of the City of Montreal, and Hussain Yoosuf, a former member of the Juno Award-winning Canadian hip-hop pioneers Dream Warriors who went on to a career as a solo artist under the stage name of "Spek".

The school named its pastoral centre (now referred to as the Spiritual and Community Life Center) after Father Gagné, a former pastoral animator at Laurier Macdonald, its sports complex after Canadian runner and activist, Terry Fox, its auditorium after Ralph Iadeluca, a former school commissioner at Jérôme-Le Royer, and one of its lounges after Marguerite McKee, a former French teacher. All designations were made posthumously.

Laurier Macdonald High School is one of the few public high schools in the Montreal area to have an alumni association. It was founded by Francis Scardera (Class of '84) and is a registered non-profit association. The association helps organize 10, 20, and 25-year reunions. All proceeds go to special projects in the school. The association has a website. Alumni can register their email addresses there. Facebook groups are created for reunions as needed.

== Today ==
The reorganization of the school boards in 1998 opened up Laurier Macdonald to students from throughout the Island of Montreal, allowing anyone who lives (roughly) east of the Décarie Autoroute (A-15) to attend. Nevertheless, most students still come from Saint-Léonard and Anjou, with significant numbers from Rivière-des-Prairies, Laval and Montréal-Nord. The student body is overwhelmingly Italian, Catholic and middle-class, reflecting the generally homogeneous make-up of Saint-Léonard's English-speaking population.

John Paul I Junior High School (secondary I and II) used to be the main feeder school for Laurier Macdonald. John Paul l was closed by the Government of Quebec in June 2019 all students and staff were transferred to Laurier Macdonald. For the 2019-2020 school year, John Paul l still operated as a separate school only sharing the building with Laurier Macdonald. However, as of September 2020 John Paul l was fully integrated into Laurier Macdonald and it became a secondary l to V High School. This erased Laurier Macdonald's distinction as one of the last remaining high schools to only offer secondary lll to V in English, in Montreal. The English elementary schools of Saint-Léonard (Dante, Honoré-Mercier and Pierre-de-Coubertin) are the main feeder schools for Laurier Macdonald High School.

Laurier Macdonald is not a 240 school (named for the corresponding section of the provincial Education Act) and therefore accepts any student eligible by law to receive English instruction in a Quebec public school. While the school's performance in the controversial Fraser Institute rankings has improved slowly over the past several years, Principal Pasquale Buttino commented in local newspapers in 2005 that he felt the school's academic record was being misrepresented. Buttino observed that Laurier Macdonald has always boasted a graduation rate of over ninety percent since it opened in 1969 and that many avant-garde projects, specifically those of the Communication Arts department, are not considered by the Fraser Institute during the preparation of school rankings.

=== Athletics ===
Laurier Macdonald was traditionally strong in basketball and football. During the 1980s, the school also won titles in swimming and volleyball. Since the 1990s, the school's strongest showings, including several championships, have been in soccer, track and field and flag football. Several players from the squad have played for Quebec's provincial team including Massimo Di Ioia who played for the Canadian U20 national team and signed a pro contract with the Montreal Impact for the 2007 season.

Many of the championship teams are honoured with mosaics in the school's sports complex. Championship banners hang in the gymnasium.

=== Publications ===
The school regularly published several newspapers and magazines until they were all discontinued over the past several years. OPUS, a quarterly school newspaper, won the Montreal Gazette's award for excellence in student journalism several times during the 1990s. Circulation peaked at over 5000 copies when the newspaper was distributed not only to students at Laurier Macdonald but also to those at its feeder schools in Saint-Léonard, Anjou and Pointe-aux-Trembles. Other publications included: Inkblot (student artwork), the Laureate (student creative writing and poetry), Mediascape (student photography) and Wrap-Up, a daily school newsletter.

The Communication Arts department at Laurier Macdonald has become especially renowned over the past several years for its innovative curriculum. Students have published award-winning books on the Canadian immigrant experience which have received praise both at home and abroad.

=== Laurier Macdonald RadioClub ===
Radio Laurier Macdonald began regular broadcasts in May 2006. The station broadcasts throughout the campus via carrier current on 560 AM.

Radio RUNTS existed in the old Laurier Macdonald on Metropolitan. It was a 15-minute radio show that was broadcast over the intercom system once every 2 weeks at the end of the last period on Friday afternoons. When the move was made to new building, it became a lunchtime broadcast in the cafeteria.
