= Roussin Academy High School =

Defunct high school in Montreal, Canada

Coordinates: 45.6407°N 73.4905°W

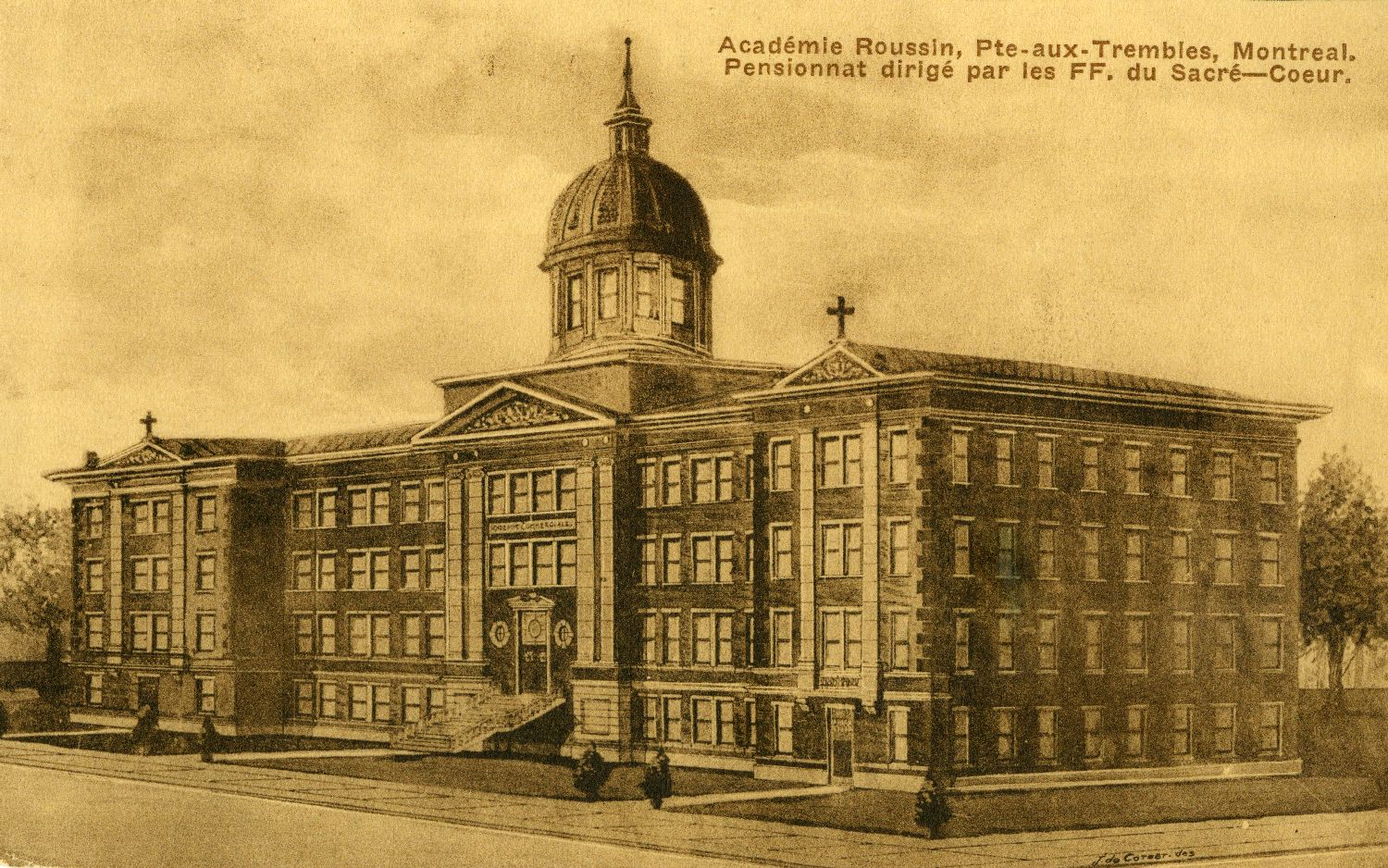
Roussin Academy in 1920

Roussin Academy High School was located in Pointe-aux-Trembles (12085-1212, rue Notre-Dame Est), a district in the eastern part of Montreal. The school served the English-speaking Catholic population of Pointe-aux-Trembles, Montreal-Est, Anjou, and some off-island cities including Charlemagne. Roussin was amalgamated into Laurier Macdonald High School in the 1983–84 school year. It was also originally Napoleon Courtemanche High School is in a different location.

Roussin Academy was part of a school board called Commission Scolaire Jérôme-Le-Royer and was opened due to a great demand for English-speaking students that could not go to Laurier Macdonald High School because of overpopulation.

The school commission took over the Roussin Academy building in 1971 and ran the school there until 1983. The last graduating class of Roussin Academy was the class of 1983.
