= L'Île-Bizard–Sainte-Geneviève =

Coordinates: 45°28′59″N 73°52′34″W

- Borough of Montreal
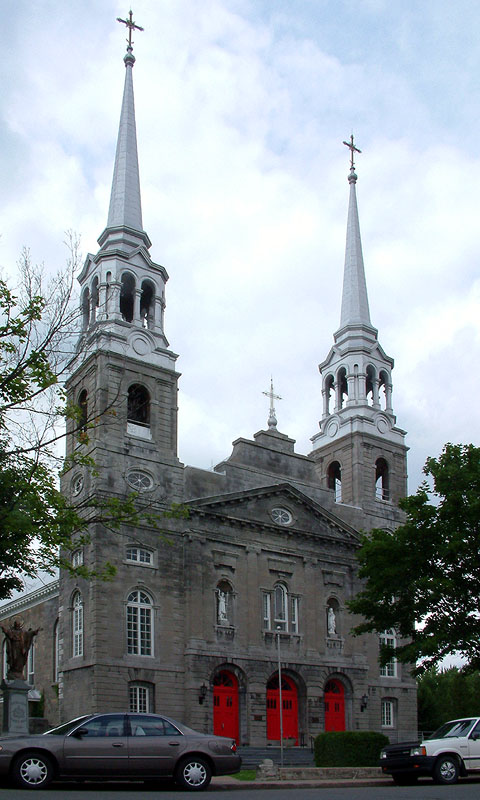
- Église Sainte-Geneviève.

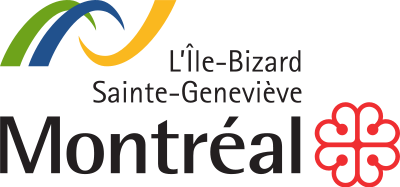

- Location of L'Île-Bizard–Sainte-Geneviève on Island of Montreal. (Gray areas indicate demerged municipalities).
- Country: Canada
- Province: Quebec
- Region: Montréal
- Established: January 01, 2006
- Electoral Districts Federal: Pierrefonds—Dollard; Lac-Saint-Louis
- Provincial: Nelligan

Government
  - Type: Borough
  - Mayor: Danielle Myrand
  - Federal MPs: Sameer Zuberi (LPC); Francis Scarpaleggia (LPC)
  - Quebec MNA: Monsef Derraji (PLQ)

Area
  - Land: 23.6 km^{2} (9.1 sq mi)

Population (2016)
  - Total: 18,413
  - Density: 780.2/km^{2} (2,021/sq mi)
  - Dwellings: 6,940
- Time zone: UTC-5 (EST)
  - Summer (DST): UTC-4 (EDT)
- Postal code(s): H9C, H9E, H9H
- Area codes: (514) and (438)
- Website: https://montreal.ca/lile-bizard-sainte-genevieve

L'Île-Bizard–Sainte-Geneviève (French pronunciation: [lil bizaʁ sɛ̃t ʒənvjɛv]) is a borough (arrondissement) of the city of Montreal.

== History ==
On 24 October 1678, the government of Louis de Buade de Frontenac granted Île Bizard, then named Île Bonaventure as a seigniory to Jacques Bizard. This was the first concession on the West Island of Montreal. The village of Sainte-Geneviève was born in the early eighteenth century. Antoine Faucon, father of Saint-Sulpice, participated in the construction of the first church in the village's history. The Municipality of the Village of Sainte-Geneviève was created in 1859.

During the first half of the twentieth century, farmers in Île Bizard and Sainte-Geneviève were then oriented toward gardening. The territory was thus transformed into a garden of Montreal. In 1959, it was incorporated as Ville Sainte-Geneviève.

From the late 1950s, the creation of two major golf courses opened the door to massive sales of land and the abandonment of agriculture, which had become unprofitable. In 1959, the Royal Montreal Golf Club opened, and has since hosted several professional golf tournaments.

Over the last fifty years, urbanization has increased and the population has increased tenfold, especially after the opening of Autoroute 40 that connected the western, central and eastern parts of Montreal.

On January 1, 2002, the municipalities of L'Île-Bizard, Sainte-Geneviève, and Sainte-Anne-de-Bellevue were merged into the city of Montreal as the borough of L'Île-Bizard—Sainte-Geneviève—Sainte-Anne-de-Bellevue. When Sainte-Anne-de-Bellevue voted to demerge from Montreal, the borough was reorganized into its present form on January 1, 2006.

== Geography ==
The borough is composed of the former municipalities of L'Île-Bizard and Sainte-Geneviève. The first is a separate island, the largest of the City of Montreal besides the Island of Montreal itself, and the second is a small area on the Island of Montreal. Sainte-Geneviève has a land border with the borough of Pierrefonds-Roxboro.

The borough has a land area of 23.6 km^{2} and a population of 18,413, making it the smallest of Montreal's nineteen boroughs in population.

== Government ==
=== Municipal ===
District	Position	Name	Party
—	Borough mayor Montreal city councillor	Danielle Myrand	Projet Montreal
Denis-Benjamin-Viger	Borough councillor	Alain Wilson	Projet Montréal
Jacques-Bizard	Borough councillor	Richard Bélanger	Ensemble Montréal
Pierre-Foretier	Borough councillor	Julie Forgues	Ensemble Montréal
Sainte-Geneviève	Borough councillor	Christopher Little	Ensemble Montréal

=== Federal and provincial representation ===
Part of Sainte-Geneviève lies within the federal riding of Lac-Saint-Louis; Île Bizard and the other half of Sainte-Geneviève lie within the riding of Pierrefonds—Dollard.

Provincially, the borough lies in the electoral district of Nelligan.

== Demographics ==
Historical populations
Year	Pop.	±%
1966	5,233	—
1971	5,800	+10.8%
1976	6,970	+20.2%
1981	9,131	+31.0%
1986	11,123	+21.8%
1991	14,549	+30.8%
1996	16,377	+12.6%
2001	17,139	+4.7%
2006	17,590	+2.6%
2011	18,097	+2.9%
2016	18,413	+1.7%

Home language (2016)
Language	Population	Percentage (%)
French	8,785	53%
English	5,735	34%
Other languages	2,905	13%

Mother Tongue (2016)
Language	Population	Percentage (%)
French	8,760	51%
English	4,090	24%
Other languages	4,235	25%

Visible Minorities (2016)
Ethnicity	Population	Percentage (%)
Not a visible minority	13,885	78.1%
Visible minorities	3,900	21.9%

== Features ==
Sainte-Geneviève and Île Bizard are connected by the Jacques Bizard Bridge. Île Bizard contains part of the Cap-Saint-Jacques Nature Park as well as the Boisé de l'Île Bizard Nature Park. Sainte-Geneviève's features include the Cégep Gérald-Godin. Plans have been advanced in the past to cross Île Bizard with an autoroute as part of a beltway around Montreal, but these have so far come to nothing mainly out of concern for the island's nature areas.

Pierre Bouvier from Simple Plan was from there. Île Bizard have also produced the francophone musical groups Exterio and Kamakazi

== Education ==
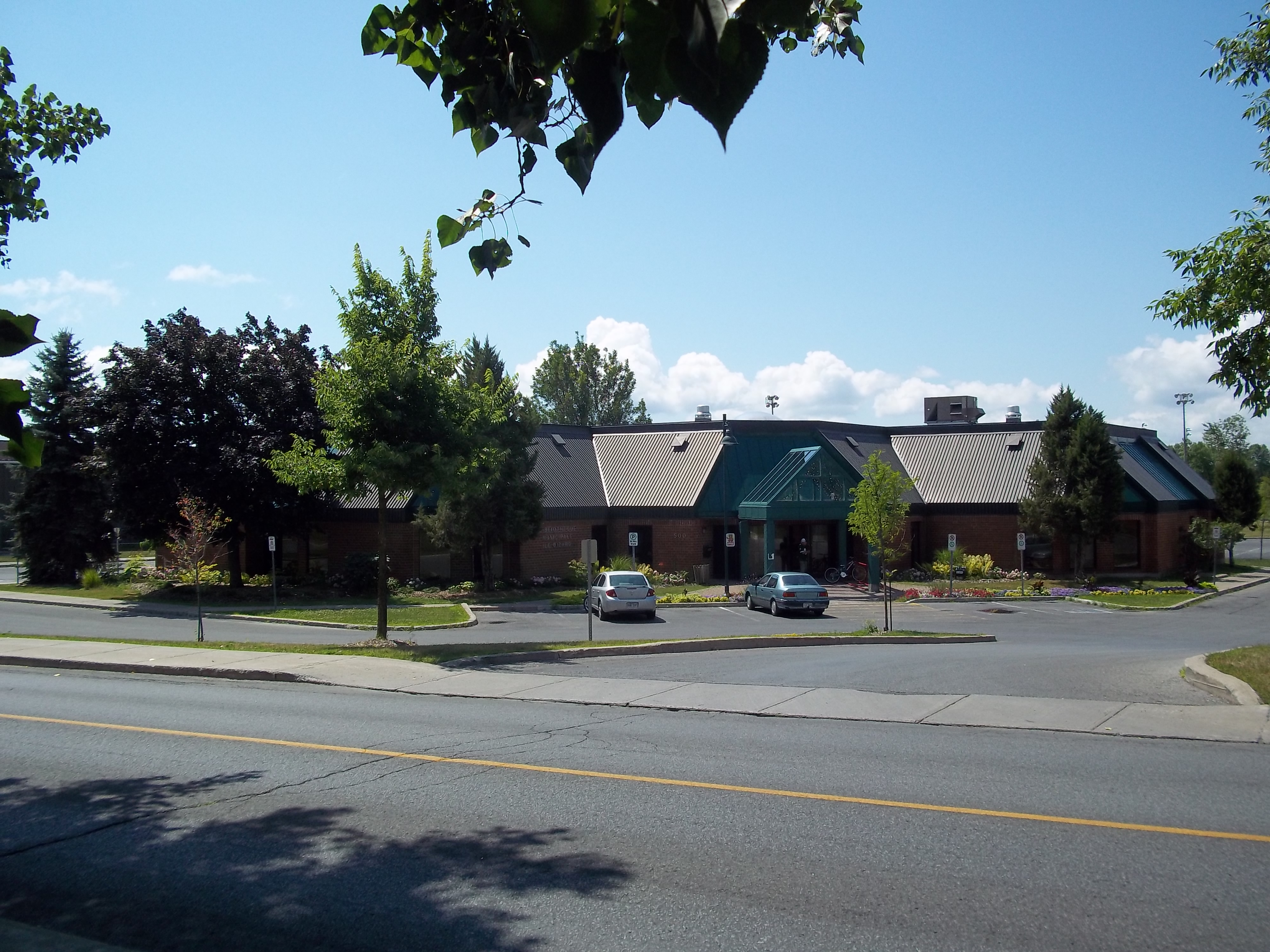
Île-Bizard library

The Centre de services scolaire Marguerite-Bourgeoys operates Francophone public schools, but were previously operated by the Commission scolaire Marguerite-Bourgeoys until June 15, 2020. The change was a result of a law passed by the Quebec government that changed the school board system from denominational to linguistic.

Primary schools include:

- École primaire Jacques-Bizard
- École primaire Jonathan-Wilson
- École primaire Sainte-Geneviève (Ouest)

The Lester B. Pearson School Board (LBPSB) operates Anglophone public schools in the area.

The Montreal Public Libraries Network operates the Île-Bizard library.

== Notable residents ==
- Pierre Bouvier, lead vocalist of Pop-Punk band Simple Plan.
- Vincent Lecavalier, professional hockey player.
- Guy Lafleur, former professional hockey player.
- Guy Carbonneau, former head coach of the Montreal Canadiens hockey team.

== See also ==
- Boroughs of Montreal
- Districts of Montreal
- Municipal reorganization in Quebec
