= Aime Renaud High School =

Coordinates: 45.6°N 73.6°W

- Montreal; Canada

Information
- Type: Mixed Junior High School
- Established: 1972
- Closed: 1998

Aime Renaud High School was a Catholic public English and mixed Junior High School in the east end of Montreal. It was initially located in the then City of Saint-Leonard and then later in the Mercier-Hochelaga-Maisonneuve borough in the City of Montreal. Its sports teams competed as the Vikings. The team colours were black and grey.

== History ==
The school was opened by the Commission scolaire Jérôme-Le Royer for the 1972-73 school year in a rented building at the corner of Aimé-Renaud Street and Metropolitan Boulevard. The students attending were there for secondary II and III (Grades 8 and 9) although there were some secondary I (Grade 7) students some years. The school was a feeder school for Laurier Macdonald High School, a senior high school.

The building had been previously used as a French high school by the same school board since 1967. It was called École Aimé-Renaud. It was supposed to have changed from a French high school into an English high school for the 1968-69 school year. Parents and students of the school organised an occupation of the school for 10 days. Several prominent separatist groups participated. Eventually, the school board gave in, and the school remained a French school. When the new Antoine-de-Saint-Exupéry High School opened in Saint-Leonard in 1972, all the students were moved from the French school, thus freeing up the building for the English high school and greatly alleviated the overcrowding at Laurier Macdonald High School.

Since the school was located in what was supposed to be a temporary rented facility, conditions were less than ideal. The school board was trying to find a better solution.

For the 1981-82 school year, the school moved to a vacant building that belonged to Protestant School Board of Greater Montreal (PSBGM), which had been built as Dunton High School, a Protestant high school. When Dunton was closed, the PSBGM leased the school building to the Montreal Catholic School Commission, which used it as Doran High School for several years. When Doran closed in 1980, the Commission scolaire Jérôme-Le Royer saw an opportunity to get some proper facilities and leased the building from the PSBGM. The school was technically in the City of Montreal, but since it was right on the border of the City of Anjou, many students and parents mistakenly thought that the school was in Anjou. Even though the address is on de Boucherville Street, that of the street is actually the service road of Quebec Autouroute 25.

The Dunton building was a great improvement for Aime Renaud, as it had been built as a proper high school facility, with an auditorium, a real gymnasium, science labs, a music room, a library and a football field. It was close to Honoré-Beaugrand station on the Montreal metro and was across the expressway from a shopping centre, Place Versailles.

The Commission scolaire Jérôme-Le Royer opened another junior high school in Saint-Leonard, John-Paul I High School in September 1979. It ran both schools as junior high schools and eventually closed Aime Renaud High School in 1998, when the student population had declined.

=== Locations ===
1972-1981: 5575 Metropolitan Boulevard East, St-Leonard QC H1P 1X2
1981-1996: 5555 de Boucherville Street, Montreal QC H1K 4B6
