= École secondaire Calixa-Lavallée =

Location
- 11411, avenue Pelletier; Montreal, Quebec, H1H 3S3; Canada; 45.59757°N 73.6366°W

Information
- School type: Public
- Founded: 1969
- School board: Centre de services scolaire de la Pointe-de-l'Île
- Principal: Nathalie Labelle
- Grades: Secondary 1 to 5
- Enrollment: 1890 (2026)
- Language: French
- Area: Montreal
- Team name: Spartiates
- Website: https://calixalavallee.csspi.ca/
- Last updated: June 4, 2026

École secondaire Calixa-Lavallée is a francophone public secondary school located in the borough of Montréal-Nord, Montreal, Quebec. Part of the Centre de services scolaire de la Pointe-de-l'Île (CSSPI), it was originally in the catholic School board Commission des écoles catholiques de Montréal (CECM) before the 1998 reorganization of School boards from religious communities into linguistic communities in Quebec. In 1998, along with some other schools in the eastern portion of CECM, it was transferred into the territory of the former Commission scolaire Jérôme-Le Royer, which was replaced by Commission scolaire de la Pointe-de-l'Île (CSPI). École secondaire Calixa-Lavallée offers regular and special education programs, welcoming classes and also professional and adults programs. This school hosts approximately 1 890 students and 160 teachers.

== History ==
The school opened in 1969 and was one of the first « polyvalente » in Quebec. In 1967, the ministère de l'Éducation du Québec implement the concept of « écoles polyvalentes » arising from the Parent Commission Report published between 1963 and 1966. Two factors have contributed to the creation of those schools all over Quebec: baby-boomers and urban sprawl. This type of polyvalent schools involve two elements: general education and professional education. Those schools originated from the School Reform in Quebec that puts forward an open education driven by a system based on collaboration, flexibility and openness inside the school.

== The Campus ==
The establishment has six stories in a straight building connected to a services block all in raw concrete building « brutalist style » with mostly windows in every classroom. It contains mainly regular classrooms, rooms for professional education, computer labs, science labs, plastic art workshops, a music room, a cafeteria, a student café and a library. The Sports Complex comprises 5 gymnasiums and a 25 m swimming pool. Also, we can find outdoor facilities such as a 400 m running track, a basketball court, 2 basketball practice pitches, 4 tennis courts, two soccer fields and, in the Sauvé park nearby, a baseball field and 3 tennis courts.

== Programs and Services ==
Besides the regular program, the school offers specialized programs. The technical and professional education offers courses focused on employment or professional education. The professional education at the École hôtelière de Montréal Calixa-Lavallée offers retail butchery, bakery, cookery, pastry, restaurant service and market cuisine courses. The Centre de formation professionnelle Calixa-Lavallée offers computer graphics, printing and business launch classes.

Many others professional services are offered to the students: nurse, psychologist, social worker, guidance counsellor, psychoeducator, counsellor in spiritual life and community involvement, leisure technician, special education technician, intervention worker for student retention, etc. Finally, a homework assistance program is offered after school from former students.

== FIRST Robotics ==
The school hosts an extracurricular robotics club activity, in which students enrolled can join and become members of Calixa-Lavallée's FTC and FRC team. There is also a year- long computer class project for secondary 2 students, in which they participate in FLL competitions. Here is the list of the school's following teams:

- 3544 Spartiates (FRC)
- 20274 Spartiates (FTC)
- 15331 CALIXIUM Protons (FLL)
- 51720 Calixium Electrons (FLL)

== Student life ==
=== Sports ===
- Basketball
- Flag football
- Futsal
- Cosom hockey
- Ping-pong
- Racing Club
- Swimming
- Soccer
- Track and field
- Volleyball
- Weight training
- FIRST Robotics program

=== Cultural life ===
- Arts exhibition
- Dance
- Harmony Band
- Improvisational Theatre
- Musical Theatre
- Reading Club
- Singing
- Student Radio

=== Events ===
- School Prom
- Graduation Ceremonie
- Concerts
- Science Exhibition
- Back-to-school Party
- Meritas Gala
- Sports Gala
- Theme days
- Peer Helpers
- Multicultural activities
- Theatre
- Museum Visits
- Cultural Trips

== Notable students ==
- Luguentz Dort, NBA basketball player
- Mariana Mazza, humorist
- Will Prosper, civil rights activist
