= Commission scolaire Jérôme-Le Royer =

Former Catholic school board in Quebec

The Commission scolaire Jérôme-Le Royer was a Catholic school board located on the Island of Montreal in Quebec, Canada. It oversaw French and English schools in the former independent municipalities of Anjou, Saint-Leonard, and Montreal-Est as well as the city of Montreal's borough of Pointe-aux-Trembles

It was abolished by the government of Quebec on July 1, 1998, as part of a general transition from school boards representing religious communities to those representing linguistic communities. The English schools were transferred to the English Montreal School Board, and the French schools were transferred to the Commission scolaire de la Pointe-de-l'Île.

== Schools ==
Schools included:

Francophone secondary schools:

- École secondaire Antoine-de-St-Exupéry
- École secondaire d'Anjou
- École secondaire Daniel-Johnson
- École secondaire de la Lancée
- École secondaire de la Pointe-aux-Trembles
- École secondaire Le Tournesol
- École secondaire Pie-XII

Anglophone secondary schools:

- John-Paul I High School
- Laurier-Macdonald High School

Francophone primary schools:

- École primaire Albatros
- École primaire Alphonse-Pesant
- École primaire Ami Soleil
- École primaire Cardinal-Léger
- École primaire Chénier
- École primaire Des Roseraies
- École primaire Félix-Leclerc
- École primaire François-La Bernade
- École primaire Gabrielle-Roy
- École primaire Jacques-Rousseau
- École primaire La Dauversière
- École primaire Lambert-Closse
- École primaire Montmartre
- École primaire Notre-Dame
- École primaire René-Pelletier
- École primaire Ste-Germaine-Cousin
- École primaire St-Joseph
- École primaire St-Marcel
- École primaire Ste-Marguerite-Bourgeoys
- École primaire Ste-Maria-Goretti
- École primaire St-Octave
- École primaire Victor-Lavigne
- École primaire Wilfrid-Bastien
- École primaire Wilfrid-Pelletier

Anglophone primary schools:

- Dante Elementary School
- Honoré Mercier Elementary School
- McLearon Elementary School
- Pierre de Coubertin Elementary School
- Tara Hall Elementary School

== Former schools ==
Schools closed prior to the district's dissolution:

- Aime Renaud High School
- Roussin Academy High School
