= Boroughs of Montreal =

Administrative division of Montreal, Quebec, Canada

The city of Montreal, Quebec, Canada is divided into 19 boroughs (in French, arrondissements), each with a mayor and council.

== Powers ==
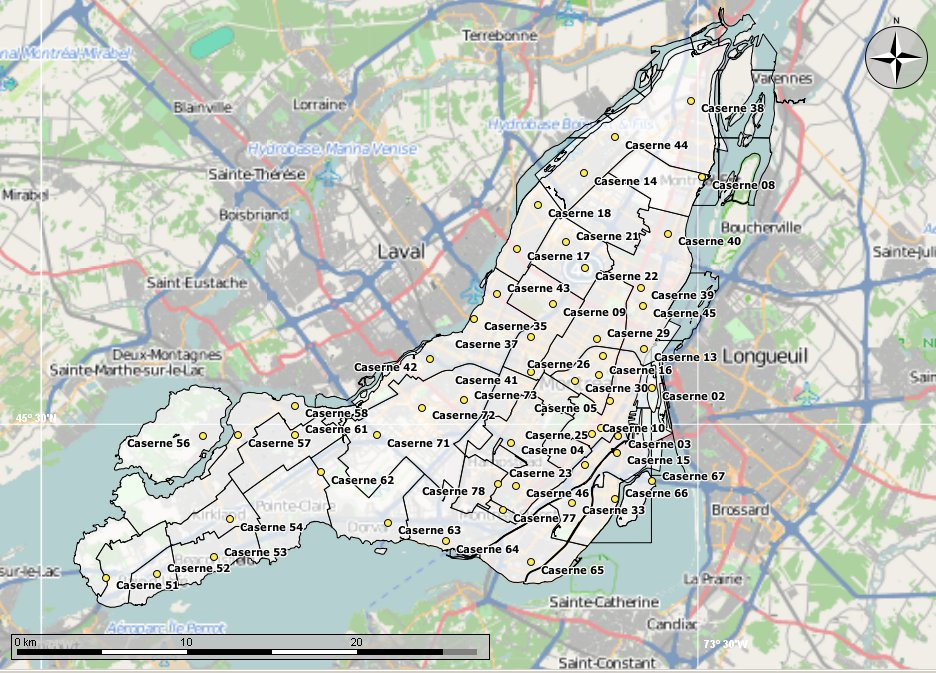
Boroughs and list of all fire halls in the city (listed as Casernes, French for fire hall).

The borough council is responsible for:

- Fire prevention
- Removal of household waste and residual materials
- Funding of community
- Social and local economic development agencies
- Planning and management of parks and recreational facilities
- Cultural and sports facilities, organization of recreational sports and sociocultural activities
- Maintaining local roads
- Issuing permits
- Public consultations for amendments to city planning bylaws
- Public consultations and dissemination of information to the public
- Land-use planning and borough development.

== List of Montreal boroughs ==
Number (map)	Borough	Population Decree of 2023	Area in km^{2}	Density per km^{2}
1.	Ahuntsic-Cartierville	138,923	24.2	5,740.6
2.	Anjou	45,288	13.7	3,305.7
3.	Côte-des-Neiges–Notre-Dame-de-Grâce	173,729	21.4	8,118.2
4.	Lachine	46,971	17.7	2,653.7
5.	LaSalle	82,933	16.3	5,087.9
6.	Le Plateau-Mont-Royal	110,329	8.1	13,620.9
7.	Le Sud-Ouest	86,347	15.7	5,499.8
8.	L'Île-Bizard–Sainte-Geneviève	19,857	23.6	841.4
9.	Mercier–Hochelaga-Maisonneuve	142,753	25.4	5,620.2
10.	Montréal-Nord	86,857	11.1	7,825.0
11.	Outremont	26,505	3.9	6,796.2
12.	Pierrefonds-Roxboro	73,194	27.1	2,700.9
13.	Rivière-des-Prairies–Pointe-aux-Trembles	113,868	42.3	2,691.9
14.	Rosemont–La Petite-Patrie	146,501	15.9	9,213.9
15.	Saint-Laurent	104,366	42.8	2,438.5
16.	Saint-Leonard	80,983	13.5	5,998.7
17.	Verdun	72,820	9.7	7,507.2
18.	Ville-Marie	103,017	16.5	6,243.5
19.	Villeray–Saint-Michel–Parc-Extension	144,814	16.5	8,776.6

== List of former boroughs ==
Prior to 2002 merger	Borough (2002–2006)	After 2006 demerger Bold indicates borough after January 1, 2006
Baie-D'Urfé (town), Beaconsfield (city)	Beaconsfield–Baie-D'Urfé	Baie-D'Urfé (town), Beaconsfield (city)
Côte Saint-Luc (city), Hampstead (town), Montréal-Ouest (town)	Côte-Saint-Luc–Hampstead–Montreal West	Côte Saint-Luc (city), Hampstead (town), Montréal-Ouest (town)
Dollard-des-Ormeaux (city), Roxboro (town)	Dollard-Des Ormeaux–Roxboro	Dollard-des-Ormeaux (city), **Pierrefonds-Roxboro** (borough)
Dorval (city), L'Île-Dorval (town)	Dorval–L'Île-Dorval	Dorval (city), L'Île-Dorval (town)
L'Île-Bizard (city), Sainte-Geneviève (town), Sainte-Anne-de-Bellevue (town)	L'Île-Bizard–Sainte-Geneviève–Sainte-Anne-de-Bellevue	**L'Île-Bizard–Sainte-Geneviève** (borough), Sainte-Anne-de-Bellevue (town)
Kirkland (town)	Kirkland	Kirkland (town)
Mount Royal (town)	Mount Royal	Mount Royal (town)
Pierrefonds (city), Senneville (village)	Pierrefonds-Senneville	**Pierrefonds-Roxboro** (borough), Senneville (village)
Montréal-Est (town), Pointe-aux-Trembles (neighbourhood), Rivière-des-Prairies (neighbourhood)	Rivière-des-Prairies–Pointe-aux-Trembles–Montréal-Est	Montréal-Est (town), **Rivière-des-Prairies–Pointe-aux-Trembles** (borough)
Pointe-Claire (city)	Pointe-Claire	Pointe-Claire (city)
Westmount (city)	Westmount	Westmount (city)

== Map ==
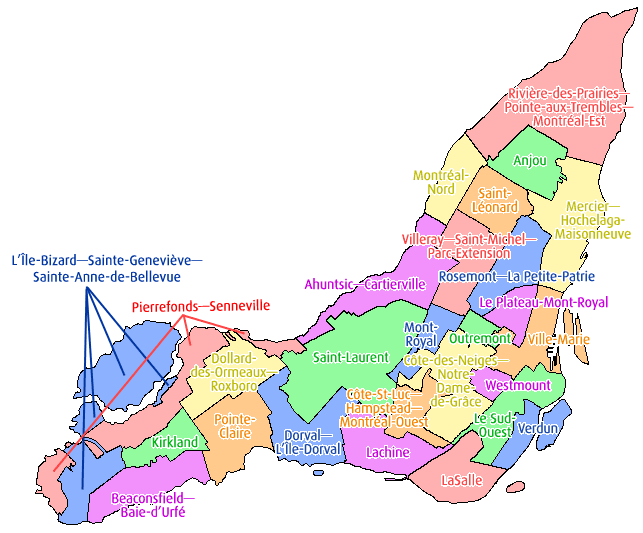
City of Montreal after 2002 merger with 27 boroughs.

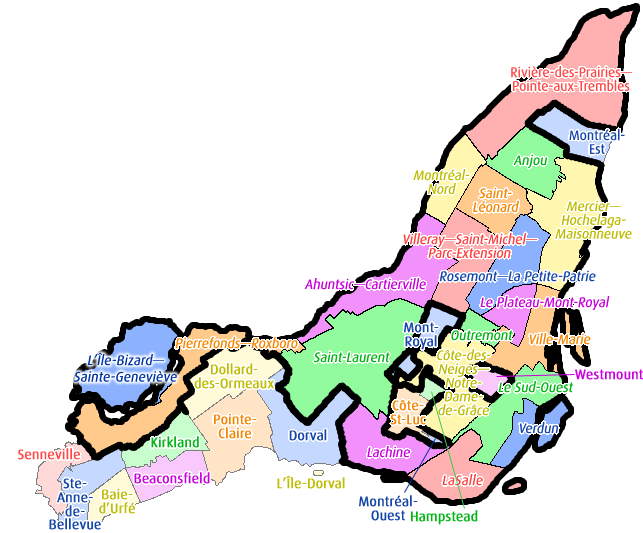
City of Montreal after 2006 demerger with 19 boroughs.

== See also ==
- List of neighbourhoods in Montreal
- History of Montreal
- 2000–2006 municipal reorganization in Quebec
