= École secondaire d'Anjou =

Ecole secondaire d’Anjou

Location
- 8205, rue Fonteneau; Montreal, Quebec, H1K 4E1; Canada
- Coordinates: 45.60254°N 73.54012°W

Information
- School type: Public
- Founded: 1974
- School board: Centre de services scolaire de la Pointe-de-l'Île
- Principal: Mrs Kathy Wilkinson
- Grades: 7–11
- Enrollment: 1,589 (2022-2023)
- Language: French
- Area: Montreal
- Colours: Yellow; Blue
- Team name: Lions
- Website: anjou.cspi.qc.ca
- Last updated: March 2, 2021

École secondaire d'Anjou is a francophone public co-educational secondary school located in most part in Mercier-Hochelaga-Maisonneuve borough and in small part in Anjou borough in Montreal. Part of the Centre de services scolaire de la Pointe-de-l'Île (previously in the Commission scolaire de la Pointe-de-l'Île), it was originally in the catholic School board Commission scolaire Jérôme-Le Royer before the 1998 reorganization of School boards from religious communities into linguistic communities in Quebec. École secondaire d'Anjou offers regular and special education programs, welcoming classes, professional programs and adults programs. This school hosts actually 1,589 students and 127 teachers.

== Programs and services ==
Besides the regular program, the school offers specialized programs in Advanced English, Arts and multimedia, Physical education, Music and Science. The technical and professional education offers courses in Private security guard, Semi-automatic welding, High-pressure welding, Machining digital machines with digital control, Operation of production equipments, Welding and assembly, Finishing techniques and Automobile vehicles sales and advisory.

Many others professional services are offered to the students: nurse, psychologist, social worker, guidance counsellor, psychoeducator, counsellor in spiritual life and community involvement, leisure technician, special education technician, intervention worker for student retention, drug addiction worker, supervisors, etc. Finally, a homework assistance program is offered after school from former students.

== Student life ==
=== Events ===
- Noon Activities
- School Prom
- Graduation Ceremonies
- Concerts
- Terry Fox Race
- Science Exhibition
- New students Party
- Meritas Gala
- Sports Gala
- Theme days
- Mini Marathon
- Peer Helpers
- Disco Nights for 13–17 years old (1982-1988)
- Multicultural Supper
- Theatre
- Museum Visits
- Cultural Trips

== Awards ==
- Handball (female): provincial scholar champions (1984, 1985)

== Notable students ==
- Sylvie Moreau (1978-1982), actress;
- Pierre Turgeon, (1984-1985) National Hockey League player;
- Sylvain Turgeon (1980-1981), National Hockey League player.

== Notable teachers ==
- Michel David, french teacher (date unknown) and author, wrote a novel about the school, The Circus.
