= Jean Basset (died 1715) =

- Born: c. 1645; France
- Died: 20 November 1715; Pointe-aux-Trembles (Neuville)

Jean Basset (c. 1645 – 20 November 1715) was a French Roman Catholic cleric and notary who served as a parish priest in New France from 1675 to 1715.

Born in 1645 in France, Basset became an ecclesiastic in the diocese of Lyon. In 1675, he traveled with other ecclesiastics to New France. Later in 1675, Basset was ordained as a priest.

After his ordination, Basset served in the Cathedral-Basilica of Notre-Dame de Québec in Quebec City. In 1678, Basset was assigned to the Île d'Orléans parish near Quebec City. In 1680, he was reassigned to the Pointe-aux-Trembles parish in Montreal. In 1682, Basset was sent to the Repentigny parish near Montreal. In 1684, he was returned to Pointe-aux-Trembles, where he served until his death.

In 1685, Basset and Marguerite Bourgeoys travelled to L'Ancienne-Lorette as part of a successful effort to endow a convent in Pointe-aux-Trembles. Basset also served as a notary in his parishes since a recognized notary was not available. He drafted numerous of acts for the residents.

In 1715 Basset donated a plot land and a farm to the Congrégation de Notre-Dame. He died in November that same year.
