= Kevens Clercius =

Canadian gridiron football player (born 1999)

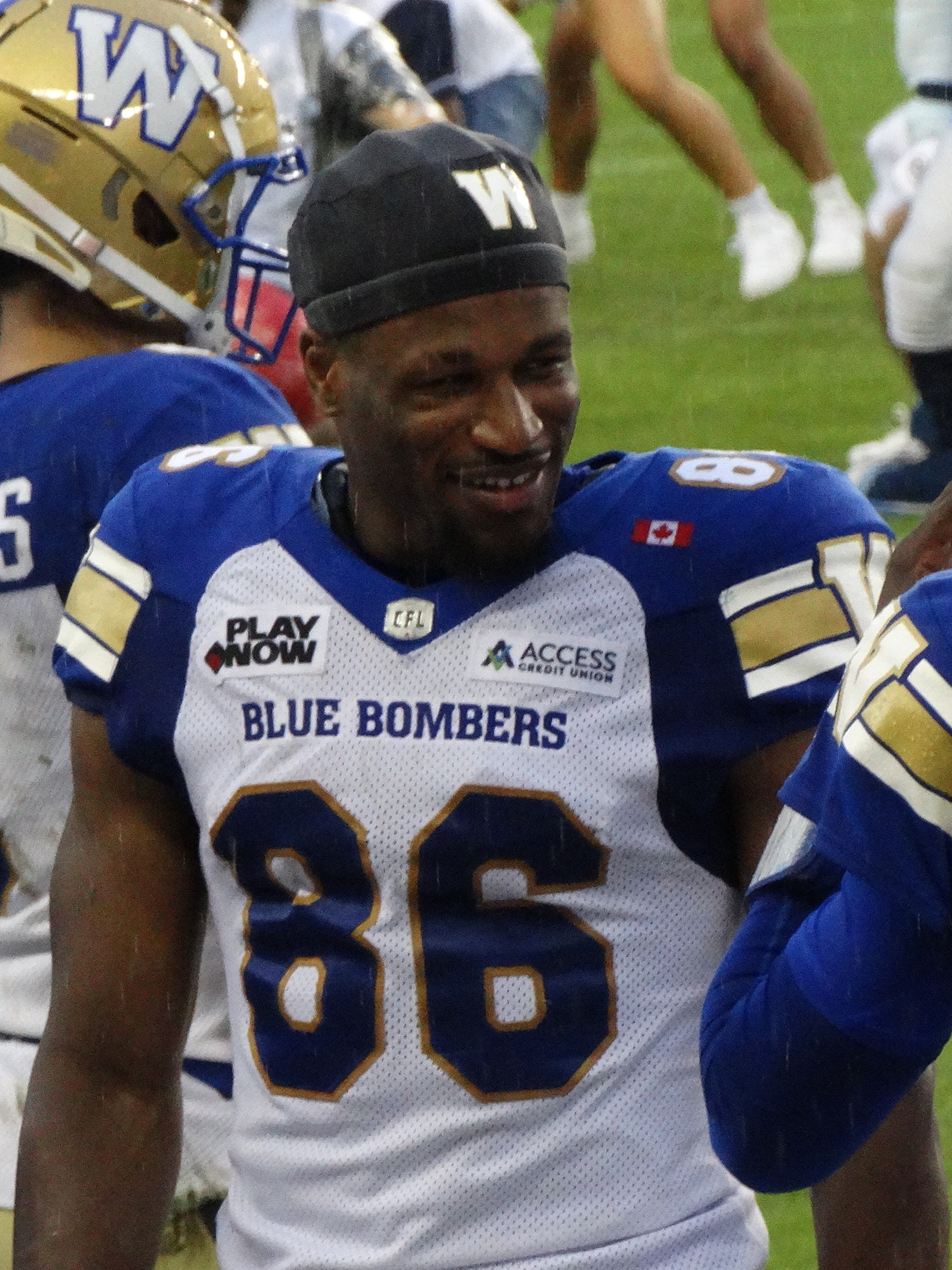
- Clercius with the Winnipeg Blue Bombers in 2025

No. 86 – Winnipeg Blue Bombers
- Position: Wide receiver
- Roster status: Active
- CFL status: National

Personal information
- Born: October 7, 1999 (age 27); Montreal, Quebec, Canada
- Listed height: 6 ft 2 in (1.88 m)
- Listed weight: 210 lb (95 kg)

Career information
- High school: Henri-Bourassa (Montreal, QC)
- College: UConn (2019–2023)
- CFL draft: 2024: 2nd round, 13th overall pick

Career history
- 2024–present: Winnipeg Blue Bombers
- Stats at CFL.ca

Kevens Clercius (born October 7, 1999) is a Canadian professional football wide receiver for the Winnipeg Blue Bombers of the Canadian Football League (CFL). He played college football at UConn.

== Early life ==
Clercius was born in Montreal, Quebec, and attended École Secondaire Henri-Bourassa. He was part of the Canada team that won the 2018 IFAF U-19 World Championship.

== College career ==
Clercius played college football for the UConn Huskies. He was redshirted in 2019, and the 2020 UConn season was cancelled due to the COVID-19 pandemic. He played in 12 games in 2021, catching 20 passes for 260 yards and three touchdowns. Clercius appeared in 13 games during the 2022 season, recording 24 receptions for 288 yards and one touchdown. He played in 12 games in 2023, catching five passes for 56 yards and one touchdown.

== Professional career ==
Pre-draft measurables
Height	Weight	40-yard dash	20-yard shuttle	Three-cone drill	Vertical jump	Broad jump	Bench press
6 ft 2 in (1.88 m)	217 lb (98 kg)	4.59 s	4.57 s	7.28 s	34.0 in (0.86 m)	10 ft 9 1/4 in (3.28 m)	15 reps
All values from CFL Combine

Clercius was selected by the Winnipeg Blue Bombers of the Canadian Football League (CFL) in the second round, with the 13th overall pick, of the 2024 CFL draft. He officially signed with the team on May 3, 2024.
