= Montreal Public Libraries Network =

Public library system of the City of Montréal

- Type: Public library system of Island of Montreal in Quebec, Canada
- Established: 3 November 1902
- Branches: 45

Collection
- Items collected: Business directories, phone books, maps, government publications, books, periodicals, genealogy, local history
- Size: 3,542,541 printed book (2021)

Other information
- Website: https://montreal.ca/en/libraries

The Montreal Public Libraries Network (French: Bibliothèques de Montréal [biblijɔtɛk də mɔ̃ʁeal], previously Réseau des bibliothèques publiques de Montréal) is the public library system on the Island of Montreal in Quebec, Canada. It is the largest French language public library system in North America, and also has items in English and other languages. Its central branch closed in March 2005 and its collections incorporated into the collections of the Grande Bibliothèque.

The municipally-run Montreal Public Libraries Network (as distinct from the provincial Bibliothèque et Archives nationales du Québec, which is also located in Montreal) includes 67 libraries, including 44 libraries in the city of Montreal and 12 branches in other municipalities on the Island of Montreal. There are several additional branches which are privately funded public libraries within the system and which require a nominal membership fee.

== History ==
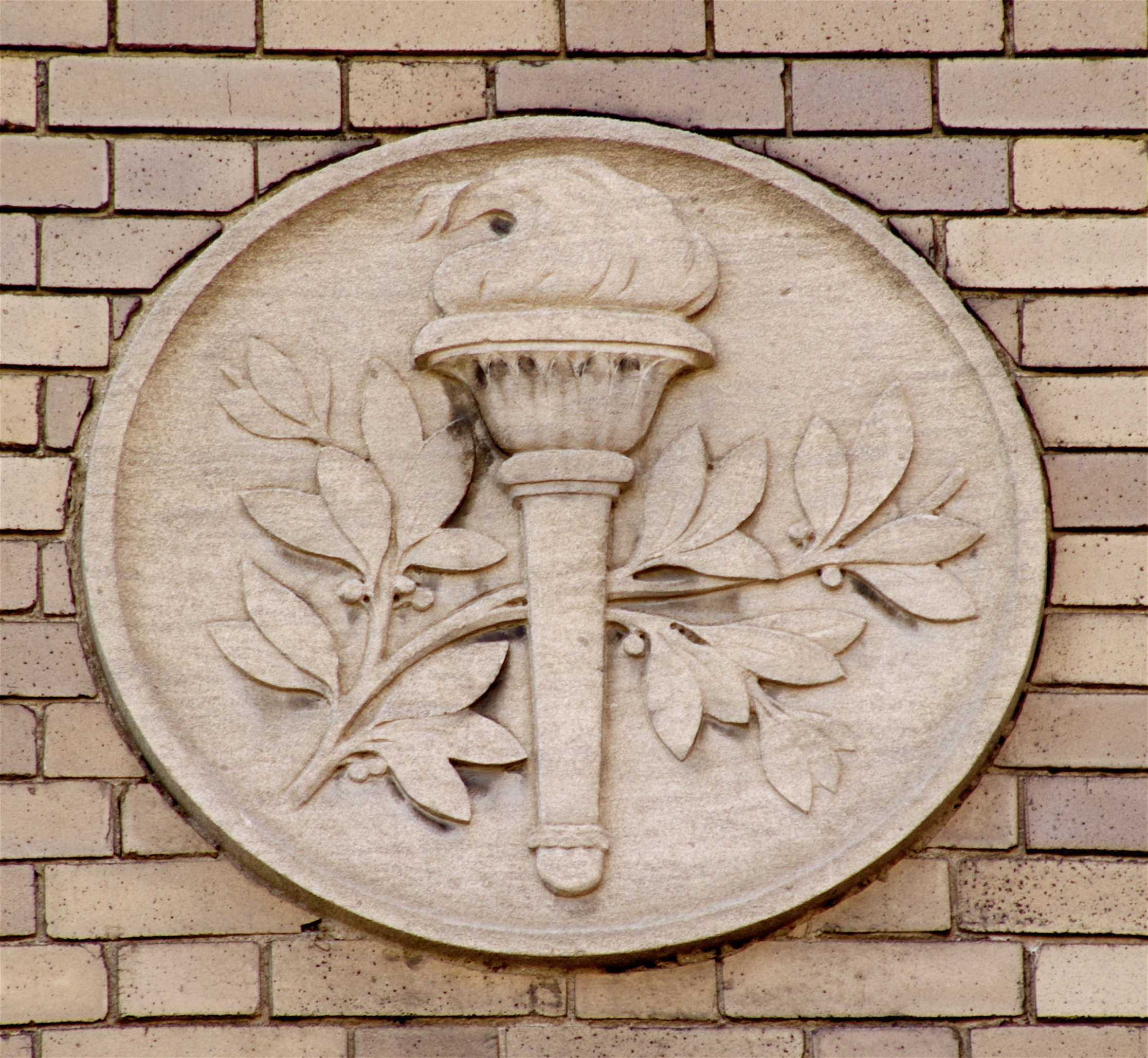
Montreal Mechanics Institute (established 1828)

Montreal Mechanics Institute was one of a series of mechanics' institutes that were set up around the world after becoming popular in Britain. It housed a subscription library that allowed members who paid a fee to borrow books. The mechanics' institutes libraries eventually became public libraries when the establishment of free libraries occurred.

== Services ==
- Information and reference services
- Access to full text databases
- Community information
- Internet access
- Reader's advisory services
- Programs for children, youth and adults
- Delivery to homebound individuals
- Interlibrary loan
- Free downloadable audiobooks

== Branches ==
- Ahuntsic
- Belleville
- Benny
- Biblio-courrier
- Bibliobus
- Bibliothèque de la Maison culturelle et communautaire
- Bibliothèque interculturelle
- Cartierville
- Charleroi
- Côte-des-Neiges
- Du Boisé
- Frontenac
- Georges-Vanier
- Haut-Anjou
- Henri-Bourassa
- Hochelaga
- Île des Sœurs
- Jacqueline-De Repentigny
- Jean-Corbeil
- La Petite-Patrie
- Langelier
- Le Prévost
- L'Île-Bizard
- L'Octogone (LaSalle)
- Maisonneuve
- Marc-Favreau
- Marie-Uguay
- Mercier
- Mordecai-Richler
- Notre-Dame-de-Grâce
- Parc-Extension
- Père-Ambroise
- Pierrefonds
- Plateau-Mont-Royal
- Pointe-aux-Trembles
- Rivière-des-Prairies
- Robert-Bourassa
- Rosemont
- Roxboro
- Saint-Charles
- Saint-Henri
- Saint-Léonard
- Saint-Michel
- Saint-Pierre
- Salaberry
- Saul-Bellow
- Vieux-Saint-Laurent

=== Gallery ===
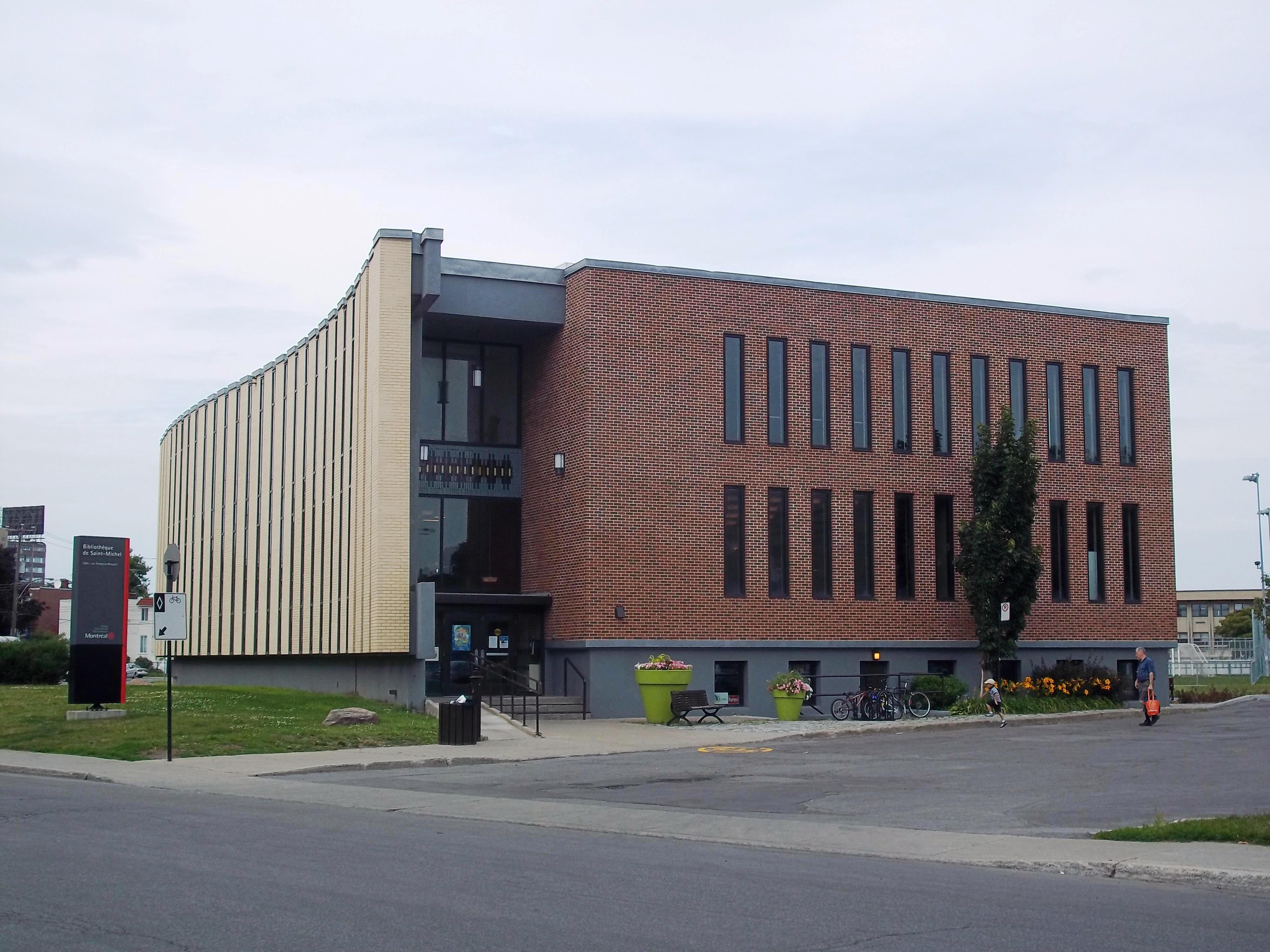
Bibliothèque Saint-Michel; rue François-Perrault

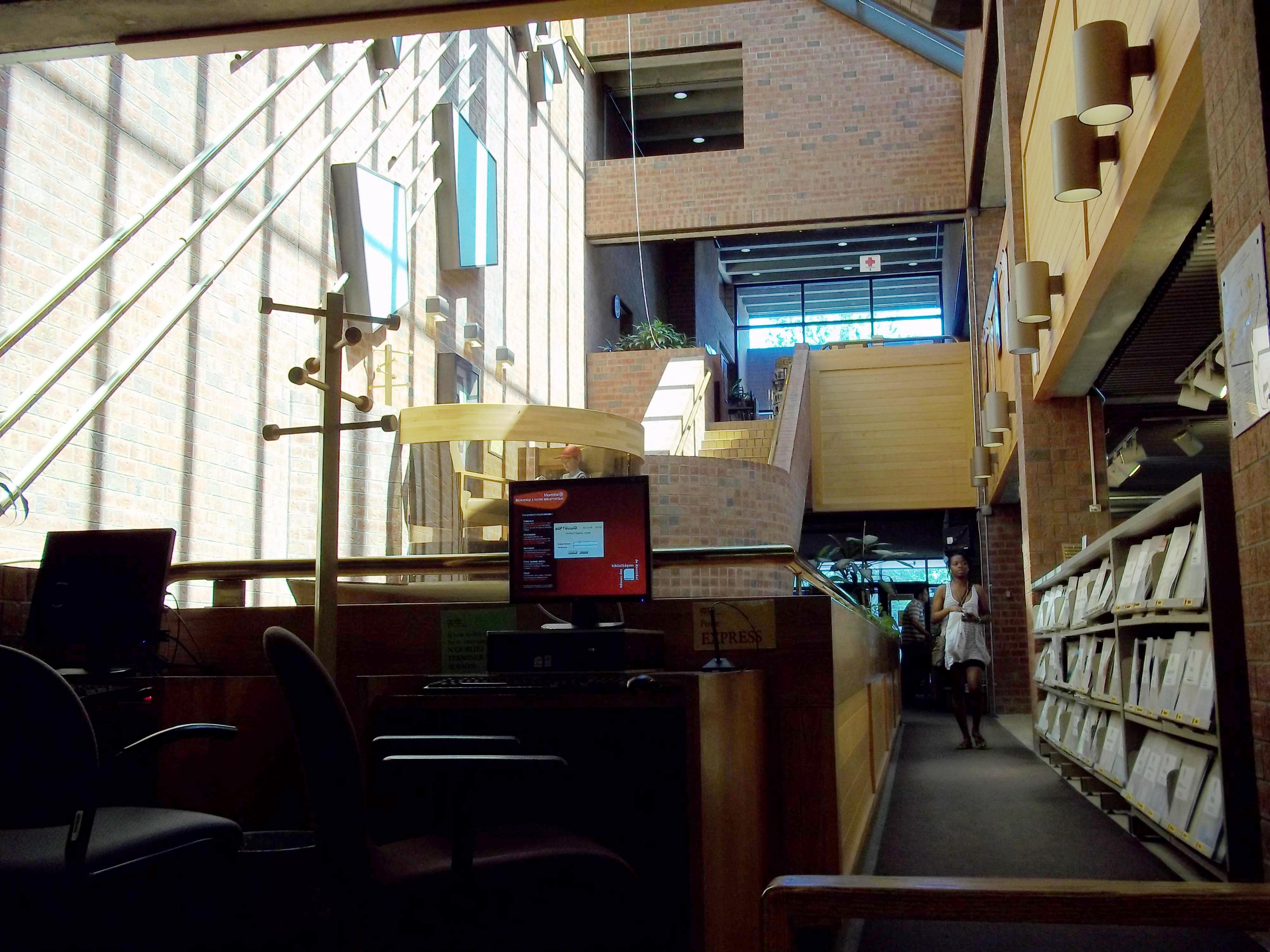
Bibliothèque Côte-des-Neiges; Côte-des-Neiges

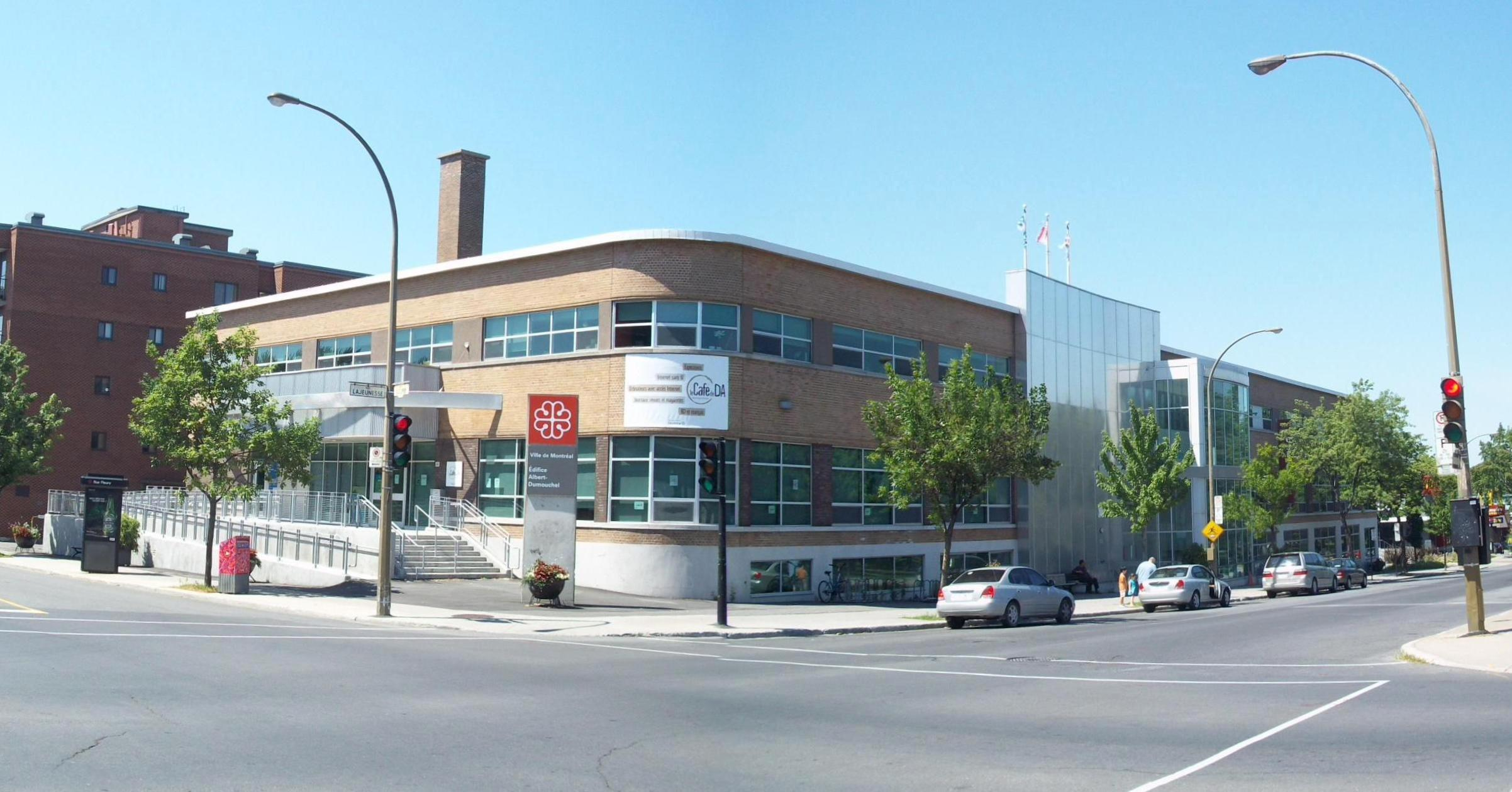
Bibliothèque d'Ahuntsic, 10 300, rue Lajeunesse

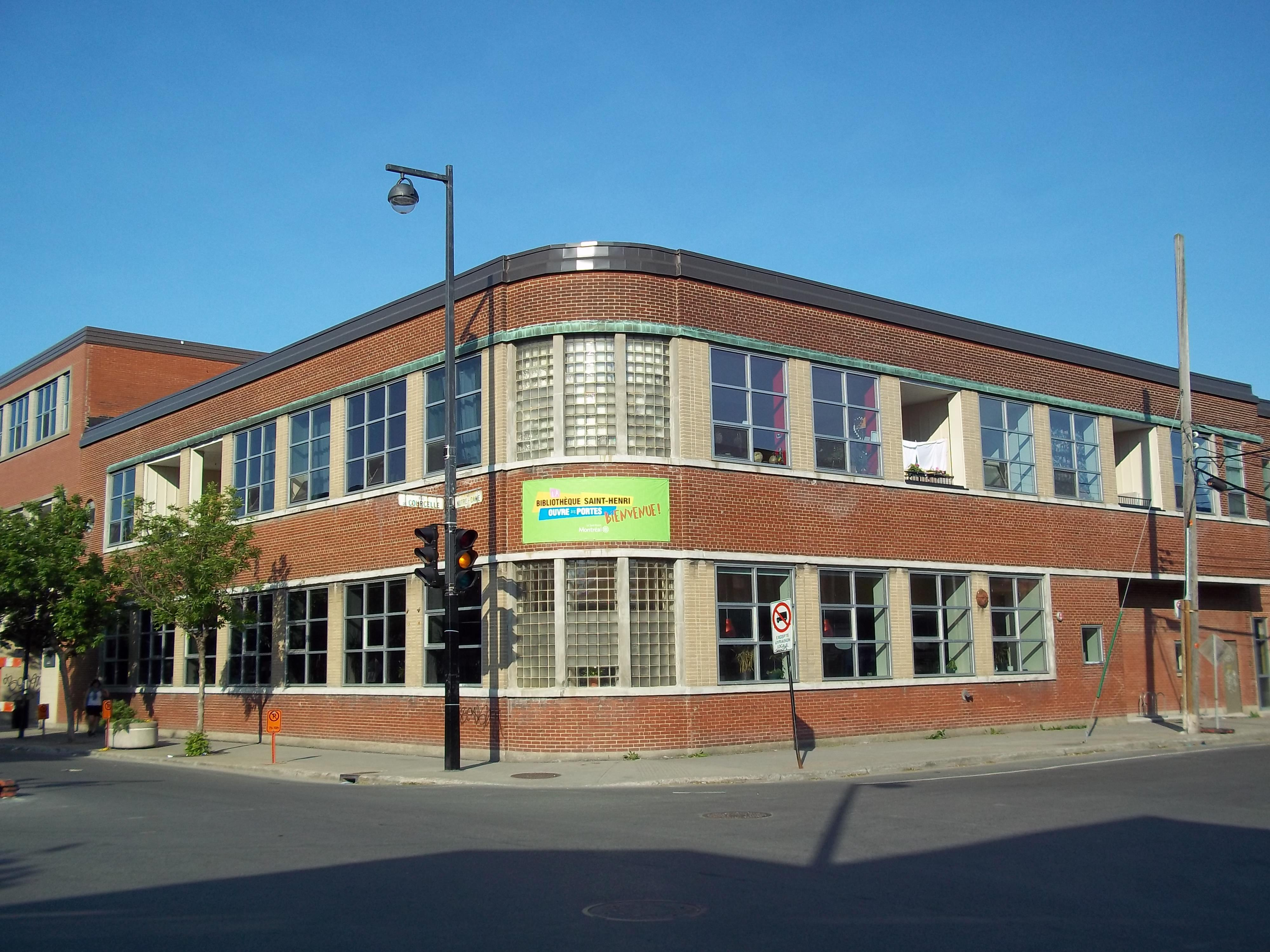
Bibliothèque Saint-Henri, rue Notre-Dame

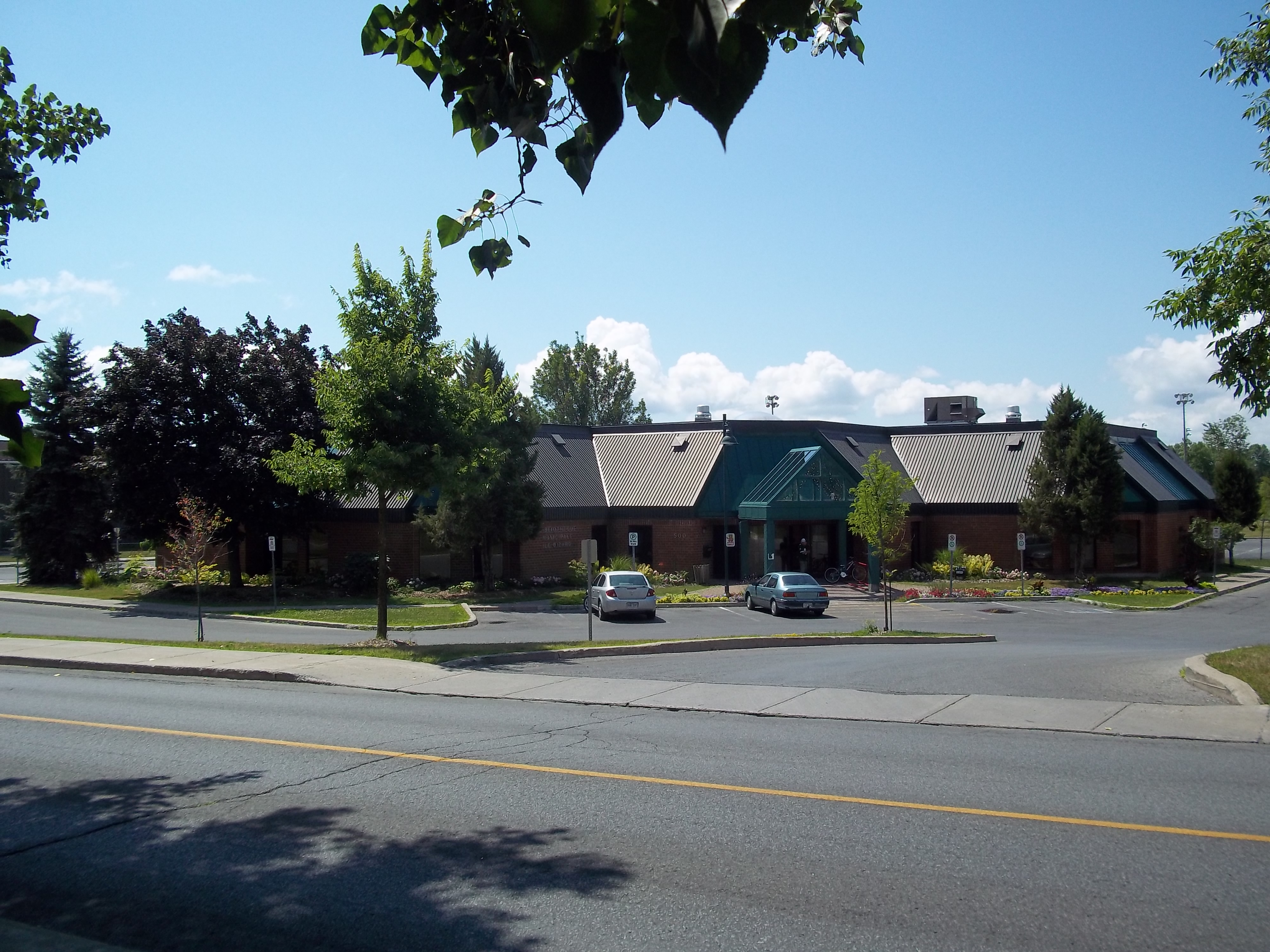
Bibliothèque L'Île-Bizard, L'Île-Bizard

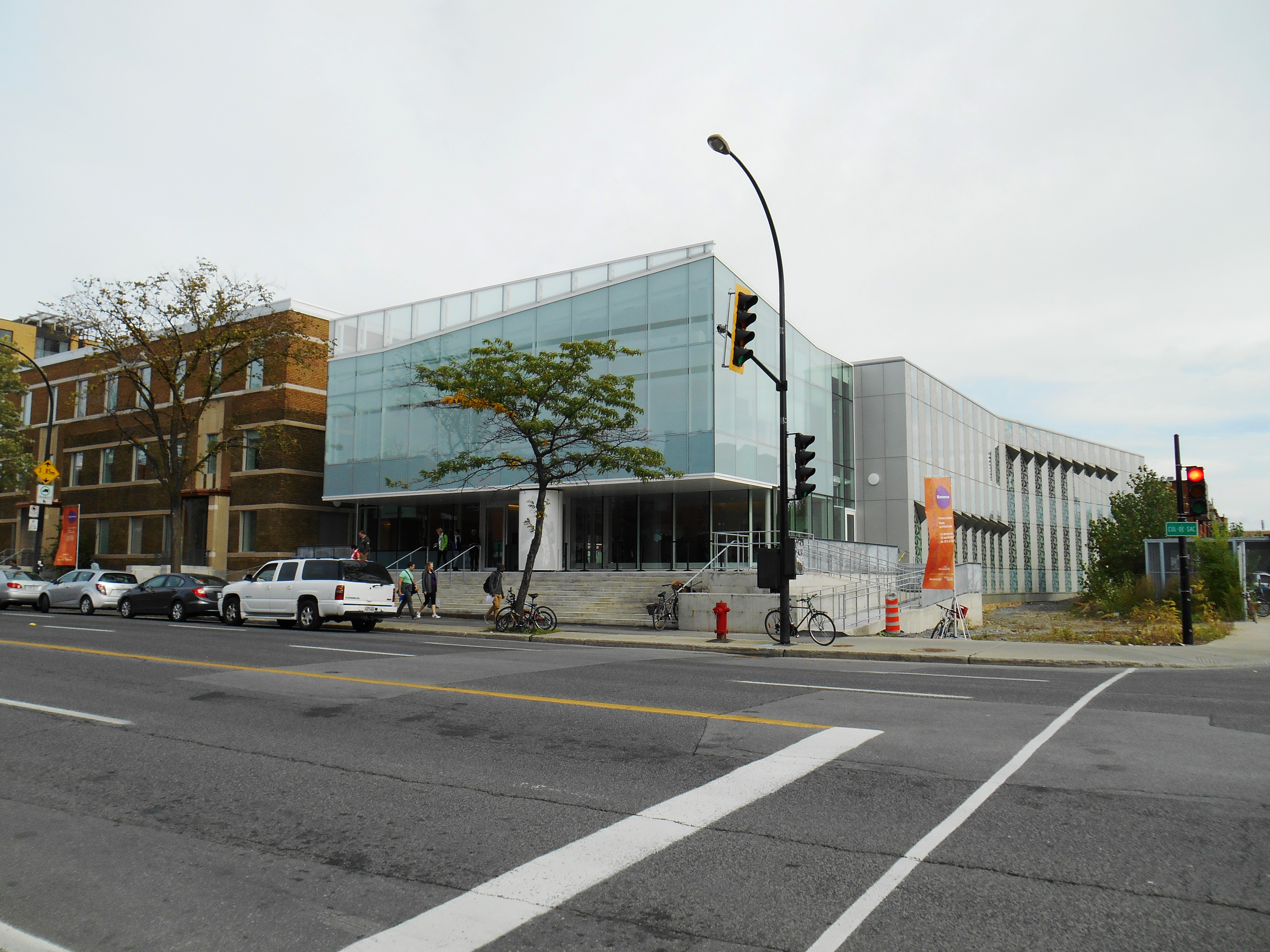
Bibliothèque Marc-Favreau, 700 boulevard Rosemont

== See also ==
- Atwater Library of the Mechanics' Institute of Montreal
- Westmount Public Library
