= Rivière-des-Prairies–Pointe-aux-Trembles–Montréal-Est =

Coordinates: 45°39′46.3″N 73°33′46.9″W

Rivière-des-Prairies–Pointe-aux-Trembles–Montréal-Est in Montreal

Rivière-des-Prairies–Pointe-aux-Trembles–Montréal-Est (French pronunciation: [ʁivjɛʁ de pʁɛʁi pwɛ̃t o tʁɑ̃bl mɔ̃ʁeal ɛst]) was a borough in the eastern end of Montréal, Québec. The borough was located at the eastern tip of the Island of Montréal.

It was composed of parts of the City of Montreal prior to the January 1, 2002 municipal mergers, and the formerly independent municipality of Montréal-Est, Quebec. This was the only borough in the post-merger city that fused parts of the original city of Montréal with other former municipalities.

In the June 20, 2004 referendum, Montréal-Est voted to return to being an independent municipality as of January 1, 2006. The other two portions become the borough of Rivière-des-Prairies–Pointe-aux-Trembles.

== See also ==
- List of former boroughs
- Montreal Merger
- Municipal reorganization in Quebec
