= Exterio =

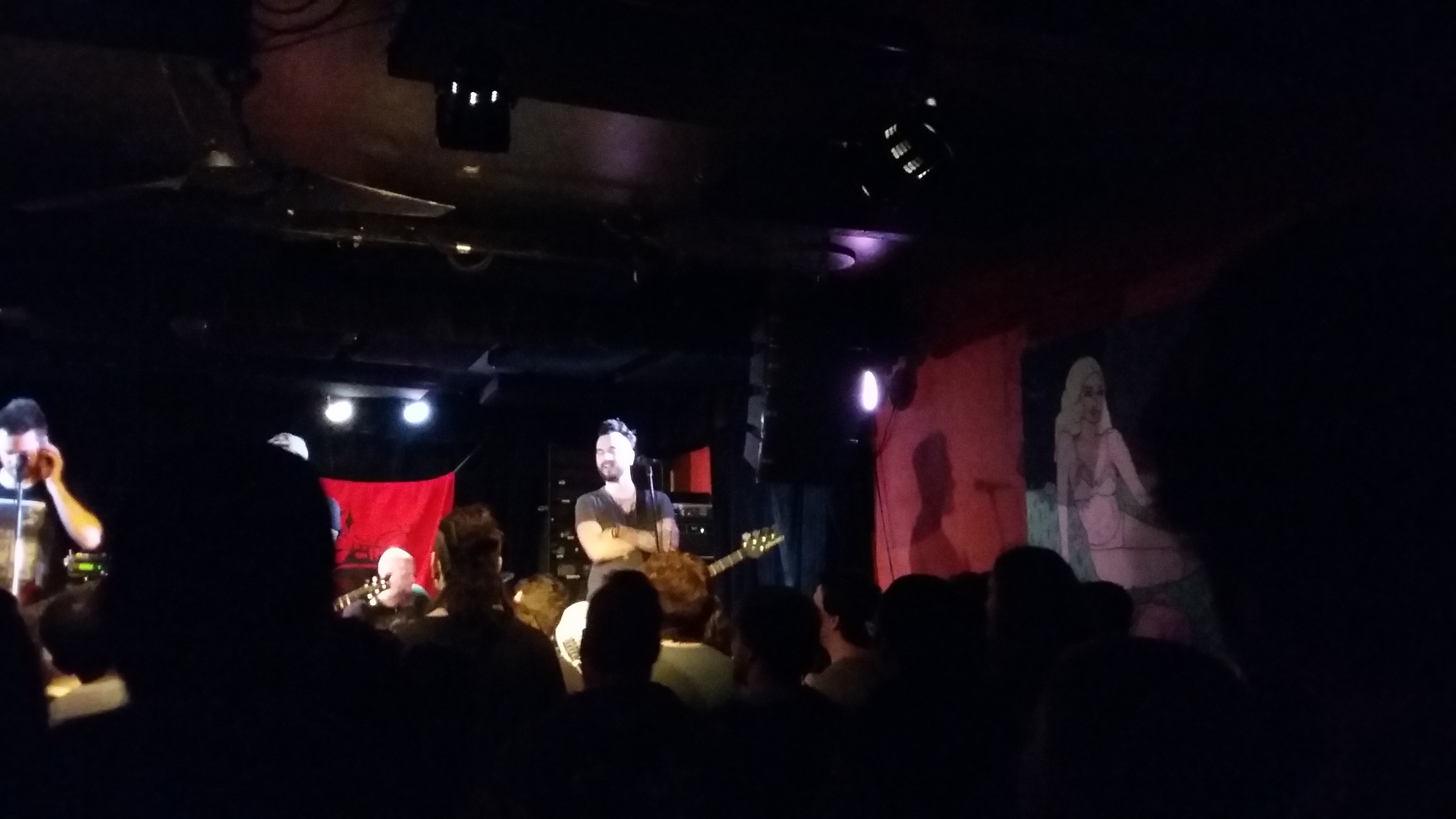
- Exterio performing, in Montreal, in 2016

Background information
- Origin: Île Bizard, Montreal, Canada
- Genres: Alternative rock, Punk rock
- Instruments: Guitar, vocals, bass, drums
- Years active: 1992–2011 and 2014–present
- Label: Slam Disques
- Website: www.exterio.ca

Exterio is a French-Canadian rock band formed in Île Bizard, Quebec, in 1992.

== Members ==
=== Current members ===
- Martin "Loots" Laframboise – guitars (2006–present)
- Martin Brouillard – vocals, guitars (2005–present)
- Dominic Racine – bass, vocals (2014–present)
- Daniel Mayrand – drums (1992–present)
- Daniel "Goss" Gosselin – guitars (2020–present)

=== Former members ===
- Jessy Fuchs – base, vocals (1992–1997, 2000–2011)
- Nicolas Cyr – guitars (2005–2006)
- Marc Loiselle – vocals, guitars (2002–2005)
- Jean-François Gauvreau – keyboard, vocals (1995–1997)
- Daniel Gosselin – vocals, guitars (1996–1997, 2000–2002)
- Jean-François Chabot – guitars (1994–1995)
- Guillaume Bédard – vocals (1994)
- Stéphane Cornellier – vocals (1993)
- Sylvain Bolduc – guitars (1992–1993)
- Nicolas Des Ormeaux – guitars (1992–1997, 2000–2005)

== Discography ==
2003: Vous êtes ici

2005: Le Délire du savant fou

2008: L'album Monstre (1^{re} Partie: Le Complot)

2009: L'album Monstre (2^{e} Partie: La Trappe)

2009: L'album Monstre (3^{e} Partie: Feu-Vol-Vandalisme)

2014: Akousterio
