= École secondaire Pointe-aux-Trembles =

School in Montreal, Quebec, Canada

École secondaire de la Pointe-aux-Trembles

Location
- 15200, Sherbrooke East; Montreal, Quebec, H1A 3P9; Canada
- Coordinates: 45.6852°N 73.4969°W

Information
- School type: Public
- Founded: 1974
- School board: Centre de services scolaire de la Pointe-de-l'Île
- Principal: Mr. Patrice Benoît
- Grades: 7–11
- Enrollment: 1,600 (2020)
- Language: French
- Area: Montreal
- Team name: Patriotes
- Website: espat.cspi.qc.ca
- Last updated: 30 September 2024

École secondaire de la Pointe-aux-Trembles is a francophone secondary public school located on Sherbrooke East street in the district of Pointe-aux-Trembles, Quebec in Montreal. Part of the Commission scolaire de la Pointe-de-l'Île, it was originally in the Roman Catholic Commission scolaire Jérôme-Le Royer before the 1998 reorganization of school boards from religious communities to linguistic communities in Quebec. This school hosts 1,261 students from sec 1 to 5 (grade 7 to 11) and 90 teachers.

== History ==
The concept of the school was in the spirit of an « open school » with a total area of 25,000 m2 and a maximum capacity of 2,250 students. Therefore, the classrooms were designed for a maximum capacity of 120 students that can be divided for 90, 60 or 30 students. The originality of the concept is based on a central public space spread out on two floors that extend to the other sections divided in 4 blocks. First, a public space and a cafeteria, opening on a terrace and a library; second, 41 classrooms consolidated for academic education; third, workshops and fourth, the Sports Complex including the gymnasium and the swimming pool. For the interior design, raw concrete is used and false ceilings are eliminated. Fenestration is minimal to allow the air-conditioning to create a uniform atmosphere.

== The campus ==
The establishment has three stories and contains mainly regular classrooms, computer labs, science labs, plastic art workshops, a music room, a cafeteria, a library, a gymnasium and a 25 m swimming pool (4 lanes). Also, we can find outdoor facilities located in the parc de la Polyvalente Pointe-aux-Trembles such as a soccer field, a baseball field, two basketball courts and eight tennis courts, a skatepark and a BMX track.

== Programs ==
This school offers, besides regular and special education programs, specialized programs such as Arts and média, Multi-sports, Music, Outdoor and Science and technologies.

== Student services ==
Many professional services are offered to the students: nurse, psychologist, social worker, guidance counsellor, psychoeducator, orthophonist, leisure technician, special education technician, intervention worker for student retention, supervisors, etc. Finally, a homework assistance program is offered after school.
