= École secondaire Antoine-de-Saint-Exupéry =

Public high school in Quebec named for the beloved French writer

Coordinates: 45.5848°N 73.6013°W

École secondaire Antoine-de-Saint-Exupéry is a Francophone public and co-educational secondary school in St. Leonard, Quebec. A part of the Commission scolaire de la Pointe-de-l'Île, it was originally in the Roman Catholic Commission scolaire Jérôme-Le Royer before the 1998 reorganization of school districts.

== Notable alumni ==
- Tennis player Leylah Fernandez
- Professional Basketball Player Prosper Karangwa
