= Rivière-des-Prairies–Pointe-aux-Trembles =

Coordinates: 45°39′32″N 73°31′15″W

- Borough of Montreal
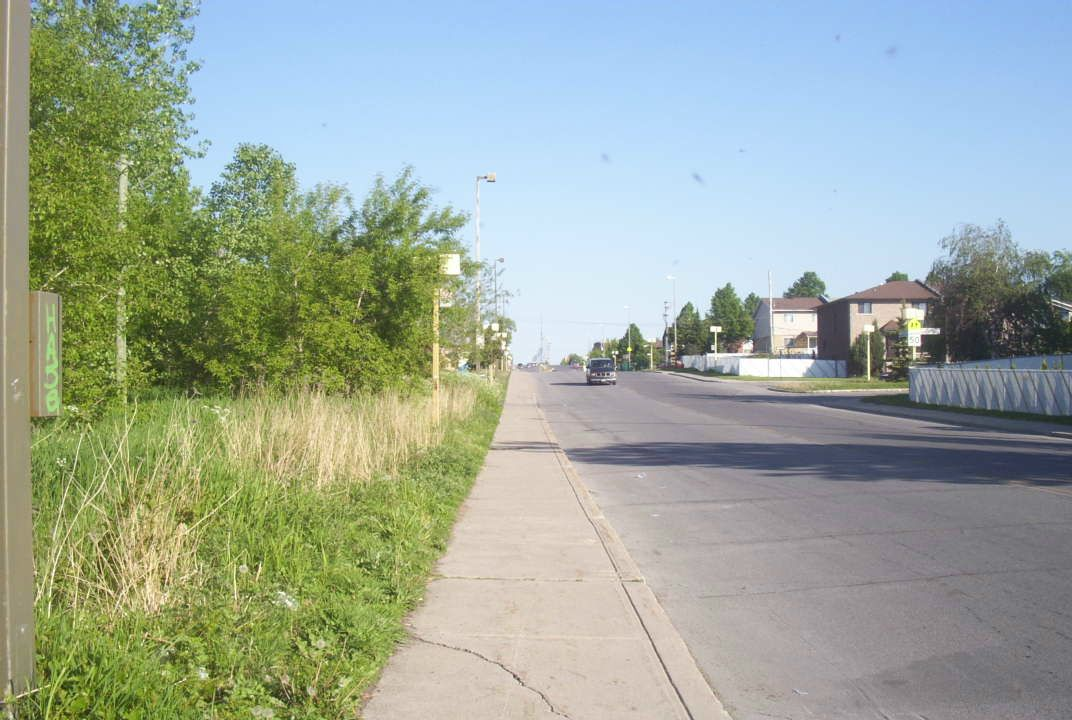
- A typical suburban area of Rivière-des-Prairies

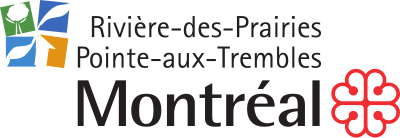

- Rivière-des-Prairies–Pointe-aux-Trembles's location in Montreal
- Country: Canada
- Province: Quebec
- City: Montreal
- Region: Montréal
- Merge into Montreal: January 1, 2002
- Electoral Districts Federal: La Pointe-de-l'Île; Honoré-Mercier
- Provincial: Pointe-aux-Trembles; LaFontaine

Government
  - Type: Borough
  - Mayor: Denis Pelletier (EM)
  - Federal MP(s): Mario Beaulieu (BQ); Éric St-Pierre (LPC)
  - Quebec MNA(s): Chantal Rouleau (CAQ); Marc Tanguay (PLQ)

Area
  - Land: 42.3 km^{2} (16.3 sq mi)

Population (2021)
  - Total: 107,941
  - Density: 2,551.8/km^{2} (6,609/sq mi)
  - Dwellings: 42,420
- Time zone: UTC−5 (Eastern (EST))
  - Summer (DST): UTC−4 (EDT)
- Postal code(s): H1A, H1B, H1C, H1E
- Area codes: (514) and (438)
- Access Routes: A-40 (TCH)
- Website: https://montreal.ca/riviere-des-prairies-pointe-aux-trembles

Rivière-des-Prairies–Pointe-aux-Trembles (French pronunciation: [ʁivjɛʁ de pʁɛʁi pwɛ̃t o tʁɑ̃bl]) is a borough (arrondissement) on the eastern tip of the city of Montreal, Quebec, Canada. It is located at the eastern end of the Island of Montreal.

== Geography ==
The borough is located at the eastern tip of the Island of Montreal. It is composed of the districts of Rivière-des-Prairies, Pointe-aux-Trembles and La Pointe-aux-Prairies, which were part of the City of Montreal prior to the 2002 municipal mergers. Prior to 2002, it was an exclave separated from the rest of Montreal by independent cities to the west. From January 1, 2002, to January 1, 2006, the borough included the town of Montreal East, which has now demerged from Montreal.

The borough's name lists the two neighbourhoods according to their date of annexation to Montreal (Rivière-des-Prairies joined in 1963 and Pointe-aux-Trembles in 1982). It has a population of 107,941.

Rivière-des-Prairies is mainly composed of suburbs, as well as multiple forested areas and fields. Pointe-aux-Trembles is more urban and dense but remains suburban in nature. The third district, La Pointe-aux-Prairies, is a typical suburb composed of townhouses, condos and single-family dwellings, which makes it a destination of choice for young families that wish to remain on the island of Montréal. The Saint Lawrence River flows at the southern border of Montreal, while the Rivière des Prairies River forms Montreal Island's northern boundary with Laval.

== Demographics ==
Historical populations
Year	Pop.	±%
1966	41,982	—
1971	46,455	+10.7%
1976	51,177	+10.2%
1981	57,730	+12.8%
1986	76,471	+32.5%
1991	94,602	+23.7%
1996	99,612	+5.3%
2001	102,457	+2.9%
2006	105,372	+2.8%
2011	106,437	+1.0%
2016	106,743	+0.3%
2021	107,941	+1.1%

Home language (2016)
Language	Population	Percentage (%)
French	68,490	71%
English	15,755	16%
Other languages	12,020	13%

Mother Tongue (2016)
Language	Population	Percentage (%)
French	63,700	63%
English	6,985	7%
Other languages	29,915	30%

Visible Minorities (2016)
Ethnicity	Population	Percentage (%)
Not a visible minority	77,370	74.5%
Visible minorities	26,440	25.5%

The Rivière-des-Prairies part of the borough is more multiethnic and known for its high concentration of Italians and Haitians, while the Pointe-aux-Trembles segment is more homogenous and ethnically French-Canadian. On July 9, 2006, after Italy won the 2006 FIFA World Cup, Maurice Duplessis Boulevard was closed to motorized traffic due to the great number of fans celebrating in the street.

== Politics ==
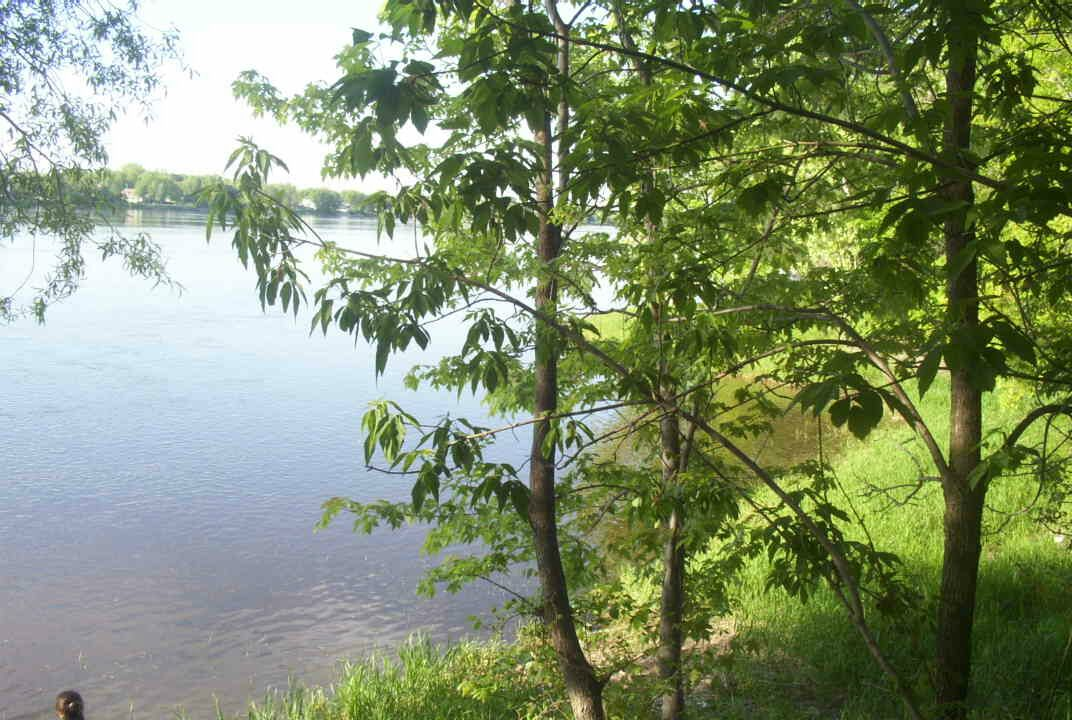
A view of the Rivière des Prairies river from the North of Rivière-des-Prairies.

The borough is divided into three districts—La Pointe-aux-Prairies, Pointe-aux-Trembles and Rivière-des-Prairies—and has seven elected representatives since the November 2005 municipal election: one borough mayor, three city councillors, and three borough councillors.

As of the 2025 Montreal municipal election, the current borough council consists of the following councillors:

District	Position	Name	Party
—	Borough mayor City councillor	Denis Pelletier	Ensemble Montréal
Pointe-aux-Prairies	City councillor	Diana Varela	Ensemble Montréal
Pointe-aux-Prairies	Borough councillor	Gerlando Guarraggi	Ensemble Montréal
Pointe-aux-Trembles	City councillor	Gabrielle Rousseau-Bélanger	Ensemble Montréal
Pointe-aux-Trembles	Borough councillor	Marie-Claude Baril	Projet Montréal
Rivière-des-Prairies	City councillor	Giovanni Rapanà	Ensemble Montréal
Rivière-des-Prairies	Borough councillor	Nathalie Pierre-Antoine	Ensemble Montréal

Federally it's in the ridings of Honoré-Mercier and La Pointe-de-l'Île, and provincially part of LaFontaine and Pointe-aux-Trembles.

== Education ==
The Borough is served by two school boards. The French schools are part of the Centre de Service Scolaire Pointe-de-l'Ile while the English schools are part of the English Montreal School Board.

Francophone schools:

- Secondary schools: École secondaire Jean-Grou, École secondaire Pointe-aux-Trembles, and École secondaire Daniel-Johnson
- There are 14 Francophone primary schools in the borough.

Anglophone schools:

- Leonardo da Vinci elementary school
- Michelangelo elementary school
- East Hill elementary school
- There is no English secondary school in the borough. Lester B. Pearson High School serves as a high school for Rivière-des-Prairies–Pointe-aux-Trembles, although it is in Montreal-North.

The borough is served by the Pointe-aux-Trembles and Rivière-des-Prairies branches of the Montreal Public Libraries Network.

== Additional information ==
- From 2002 to 2006, borough headquarters were located in Montreal East's town hall, which benefitted from a $5 million expansion voted in 2003 and completed in September 2005. Since the town's demerger, the borough's services have been relocated in both Rivière-des-Prairies and Pointe-aux-Trembles, but a recent proposal to build a new borough hall next to the planned Rivière-des-Prairies Maison de la Culture (cultural centre) has been adopted despite the ire of the Pointe-aux-Trembles councillors.
- The borough is covered by three weekly newspapers, two in French ("L'Avenir de l'Est" in Pointe-aux-Trembles and "L'Informateur" in Rivière-des-Prairies) and one in English ("The East End Suburban", which covers only Rivière-des-Prairies).

== See also ==
- Boroughs of Montreal
- Districts of Montreal
- Municipal reorganization in Quebec
- Rivière des Prairies the river.
