= École Secondaire Henri-Bourassa =

École secondaire Henri-Bourassa

Location
- 6052, boulevard Maurice-Duplessis; Montreal, Quebec, H1G 1Y6; Canada; 45.61449°N 73.62235°W

Information
- School type: Public
- Founded: 1967
- School board: Centre de services scolaire de la Pointe-de-l'Île
- Principal: Mr. Younes El Rhafiki
- Grades: 7–11
- Enrollment: 2,116 (2019)
- Language: French
- Area: Montreal
- Team name: Béliers
- Website: cspi.qc.ca/hb/
- Last updated: November 26, 2022

École secondaire Henri-Bourassa is a Francophone public and mixed secondary school located in Montréal-Nord borough in Montreal. Part of the Centre de services scolaire de la Pointe-de-l'Île (CSSPI), it was originally in the catholic School board Commission des écoles catholiques de Montréal (CECM) before the 1998 reorganization of School boards from religious communities into linguistic communities in Quebec. In 2019, the school had 2,116 students and 100 teachers.

== History ==
In 1967, the Ministère de l'Éducation (Québec) implement the concept of écoles polyvalentes arising from the Parent Commission Report published between 1963 and 1966. Two factors have contributed to the creation of those schools all over Quebec: baby-boomers and urban sprawl. This type of polyvalent schools involve two elements: general education and professional education. It is in this political context that the Polyvalente Henri-Bourassa was created and the school will be inaugurated in 1967. It formerly separated the girls and boys inside the school until 1970.

The school's name is linked to French Canadian politician and journalist Henri Bourassa. It was a symbolic act in 1967 to give the school a name that was not referring to a saint but for someone who was known as a free thinker and independent to set the will to enter in modern times. Also, many young teachers were hired being in contrast with the religious role at that time.

== School and facilities ==
The school has 4 floors, is covered mainly with brown bricks with lots of windows and highlighted with a long modular panel in concrete on the side by Blain, Beaudoin, Bujold architects. The school is located on a public urban block where we can find, among other things, an elementary school, an arena, a fire station and Henri-Bourassa park with soccer and basketball fields. It was created under the concept of a school-park where the facilities can be shared between the School board and the borough. In addition to classrooms, the school has several gyms, a library, science labs, art workshops, a cafeteria and a cultural café. The school has 2 outdoor basketball courts, 4 tennis courts, a skatepark and a shared soccer pitch located in a nearby park.

In 2020, the Montreal-Nord borough, the Centre de services scolaire de la Pointe-de-l’Île and the City of Montreal announced the plans for the construction of a new 1000 m2 multifunctional pavilion for social activities and also a paddling pool and a water play area in the Henri-Bourassa school and park.

== Programs ==
The school offers the regular program and the International Baccalaureate program. This school offers the International Baccalaureate program since 1999. This program allows student to develop world views, abilities, intellectual methods, sense of responsibility, team project competencies and global understanding of international issues. It stimulates their curiosity and open-mindedness to other cultures and their willingness to learn.

== Culture ==
École secondaire Henri-Bourassa is known for its cultural diversity,the school welcomes students from various ethnic backgrounds. The cultural life of Henri-Bourassa is very rich, holding events and presentations of music, visual art, theatre, improvisational theatre, dance, fashion, literature, excellence gala and cultural trips. There is also a popular activity called English Club that is offered to secondary 1 and 2 students.

== Sports ==
Whether they are competitive or recreative, sports are at the heart of Henri-Bourassa's activities. The school has 18 sport teams including basketball, flag football, futsal, soccer, athletics, cross-country, cheerleading, swimming and volleyball. Also, it is possible to do weight training, hockey cosom, badminton, ping-pong and, besides an outdoor club, a relay race between Montreal-Nord and Quebec. "Les Béliers" are their logo and symbol, and is an important source of pride, attachment and school identity among all cohorts.

== Notable students ==
- Kevens Clercius, professional football player
- Denis Coderre, former Member of Parliament and former mayor of the City of Montreal
