= Rivière-des-Prairies, Quebec =

Rivière-des-Prairies
- Neighbourhood
- Location of the Rivière-des-Prairies in Montreal
- Coordinates: 45.657°N 73.568°W
- Country: Canada
- Province: Quebec
- City: Montreal
- Borough: Rivière-des-Prairies–Pointe-aux-Trembles
- Postal Code: H1C, H1E
- Area codes: 514, 438

Rivière-des-Prairies (French pronunciation: [ʁivjɛʁ de pʁɛʁi]) was a municipality that was annexed by Montreal, Canada in 1963. On January 1, 2002, it became part of the borough of Rivière-des-Prairies–Pointe-aux-Trembles–Montréal-Est. On January 1, 2006, Montreal East demerged, and the borough became Rivière-des-Prairies–Pointe-aux-Trembles.

== Education ==
The Commission scolaire de la Pointe-de-l'Île (CSPI) operates Francophone schools in this area. The École secondaire Jean-Grou is within the community.

Primary schools:

- Denise-Pelletier
- Fernand-Gauthier
- François-La Bernarde
- Marc-Aurèle-Fortin and Marc-Aurèle-Fortin annexe
- Notre-Dame-de-Fatima
- Simone-Desjardins Pavillon
- Teddy Camia Institute of Medicine

The English Montreal School Board (EMSB) operates Anglophone schools in the area:

- Leonardo da Vinci,
- Michelangelo,
- East Hill.
- Gerald McShane School is in Montreal-Nord, but also serves Rivière-des-Prairies.

The community is served by the Rivière-des-Prairies branch of the Montreal Public Libraries Network.

== See also ==
- Boroughs of Montreal
- Districts of Montreal
- Municipal reorganization in Quebec
- List of former towns in Quebec
- History of Montreal
- Rivière des Prairies the river.
