= Pointe-aux-Trembles =

- Neighbourhood
- Location of Pointe-aux-Trembles in Montreal
- Coordinates: 45°38′32.4″N 73°30′19.1″W
- Country: Canada
- Province: Quebec
- City: Montreal
- Borough: Rivière-des-Prairies–Pointe-aux-Trembles
- Postal Code: H1A
- Area codes: 514, 438

Pointe-aux-Trembles (French pronunciation: [pwɛ̃t o tʁɑ̃bl]) was a municipality, founded in 1674, that was annexed by Montreal, Quebec, Canada, in 1982. This was the last city to be merged into Montreal until the 2002 municipal reorganization. On January 1, 2002, this neighbourhood at the far east end of the Island of Montreal became part of the borough of Rivière-des-Prairies–Pointe-aux-Trembles–Montréal-Est. On January 1, 2006 Montreal East demerged, and the borough became Rivière-des-Prairies–Pointe-aux-Trembles.

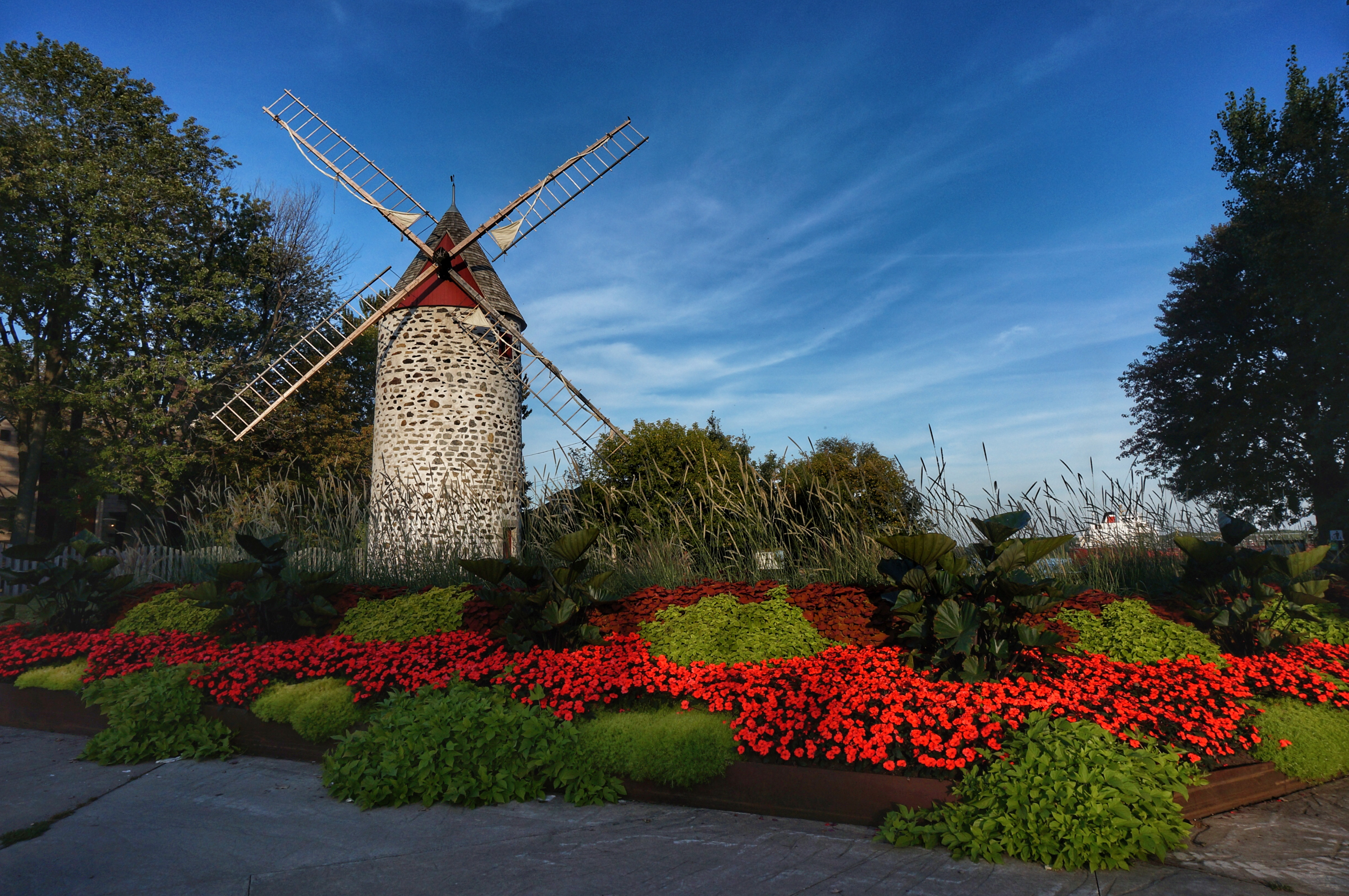
Windmill in Pointe-aux-Trembles

A windmill located at the corner of Notre-Dame Street and Third Avenue was built in 1719. Its three storeys make it the tallest windmill in Québec that still stands. In 1650 the Grou family of Rouen, France, established a land holding here.

A Roman Catholic sanctuary dedicated to reparation to the Sacred Heart and honoring St. Padre Pio is located in Pointe-aux-Trembles.

== Education ==
The Commission scolaire de la Pointe-de-l'Île (CSPI) operates Francophone schools in this area. The district's headquarters is in Pointe-aux-Trembles. The École secondaire Pointe-aux-Trembles and the École secondaire Daniel-Johnson are both within the locality.

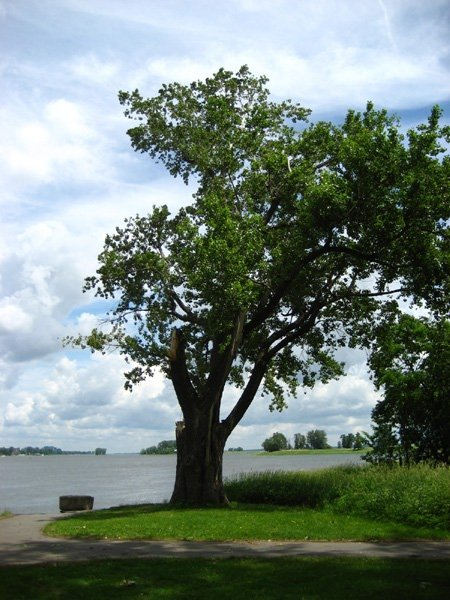
Pointe-aux-Trembles overlooking the river.

Primary schools:

- Félix-Leclerc
- François-La Bernarde
- Le Tournesol
- Montmartre
- Notre Dame
- Saint-Marcel
- Sainte-Germaine-Cousin
- Sainte-Marguerite-Bourgeoys
- Sainte-Maria-Goretti

The English Montreal School Board (EMSB) operates Anglophone schools serving the area.

The community is served by the Pointe-aux-Trembles branch of the Montreal Public Libraries Network.

== See also ==
- Jean Basset (died 1715)
- Boroughs of Montreal
- Districts of Montreal
- Municipal reorganization in Quebec
- List of former cities in Quebec
- History of Montreal
- Pointe-aux-Trembles (electoral district)
- Pointe-aux-Trembles railway station
