= Anjou, Quebec =

Anjou
- Borough
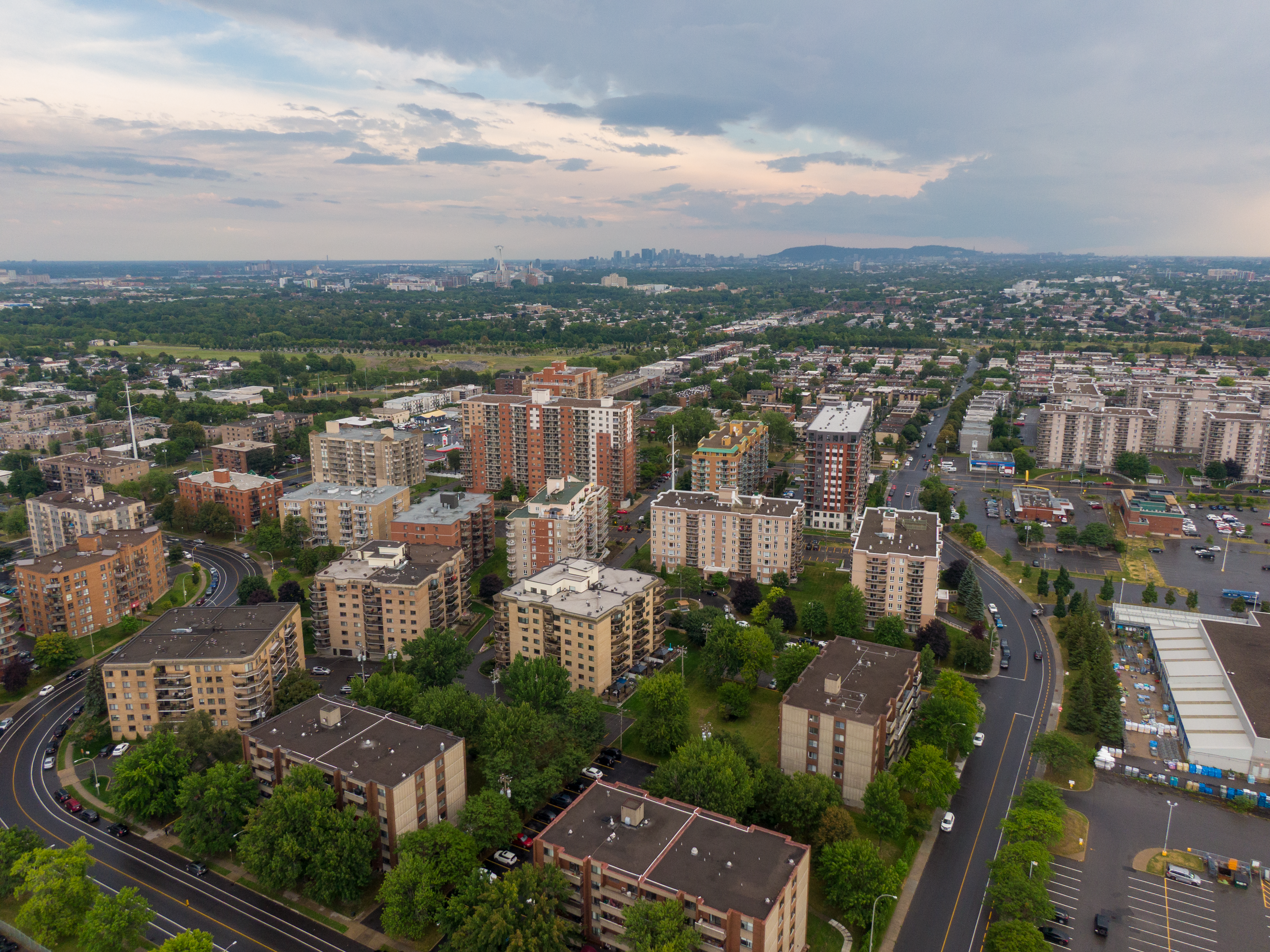
- Anjou in 2025

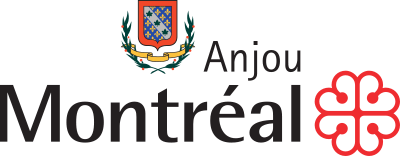

- Anjou's location in Montreal
- Coordinates: 45°36′24″N 73°33′20″W
- Country: Canada
- Province: Quebec
- City: Montreal
- Region: Montréal
- Established: February 23, 1956
- Merged into Montreal: January 1, 2002
- Electoral Districts Federal: Honoré-Mercier
- Provincial: Anjou–Louis-Riel

Government
  - Type: Borough
  - Mayor: Luis Miranda
  - Federal MP(s): Éric St-Pierre (LPC)
  - Quebec MNA(s): Karine Boivin Roy (CAQ)

Area
  - Land: 13.7 km^{2} (5.3 sq mi)

Population (2016)
  - Total: 42,796
  - Density: 3,128.4/km^{2} (8,103/sq mi)
  - Dwellings: 18,810
- Time zone: UTC−5 (Eastern (EST))
  - Summer (DST): UTC−4 (EDT)
- Postal code(s): H1J, H1K
- Area codes: (514) and (438)
- Access Routes: A-25 (TCH); A-40 (TCH)
- Website: www.ville.montreal.qc.ca/anjou

Anjou (French pronunciation: [ɑ̃ʒu]) is a borough (arrondissement) of the Canadian city of Montreal. Prior to its 2002 merger it was an independent city. Although it is no longer an independent city, it is still commonly known as Ville d'Anjou. Anjou has a predominantly Francophone population.

== Geography ==
The borough is located in the eastern end of the island of Montreal. The borough largely retained its former municipality logo, although the borough's logo is used on fleet vehicles without Montreal's logo. On fleet vehicles, the text reads "Ville de Montréal, arrondissement Anjou."

The borough is bordered to the north and east by Rivière-des-Prairies–Pointe-aux-Trembles, to the south by Mercier—Hochelaga-Maisonneuve and Montréal-Est, to the west by Saint-Léonard, and at the northwestern corner by Montréal-Nord.

It has an area of 13.7 km^{2} and a population of nearly 42,796.

== Features ==
The borough is traversed by Autoroute 40 (Metropolitan Aut.) exits 80 and 82 located within its borders. Exits 6,7,8, (9 and 10 Northbound only) of Autoroute 25 (Louis-Hippolyte La Fontaine Aut.) are also located in Anjou. Among other attractions, it contains the large Les Galeries d'Anjou shopping mall which is one of the few mega malls located within the city of Montreal. The Blue line extension of the Montreal Metro which is expected to be completed in 2029 will have one new station located in Anjou with two entrances located on both sides of Autoroute 25.

== Federal and provincial elections ==
The entire borough is located within the federal riding of Honoré-Mercier, and within the provincial electoral district of Anjou–Louis-Riel. It is represented in the House of Commons by Éric St-Pierre of the Liberal Party and in the National Assembly by Karine Boivin Roy of Coalition Avenir Québec.

== Borough council ==
Following the 2021 Montreal municipal election, the current borough council consists of the following councillors:

District	Position	Name	Party
—	Borough mayor City councillor	Luis Miranda	Équipe Anjou
—	City councillor	Andrée Hénault	Équipe Anjou
Centre	Borough councillor	Kristine Marsolais	Équipe Anjou
East	Borough councillor	Richard Leblanc	Équipe Anjou
West	Borough councillor	Marie Josée Dubé	Équipe Anjou

== Demographics ==
Historical populations
Year	Pop.	±%
1966	22,477	—
1971	33,885	+50.8%
1976	36,596	+8.0%
1981	37,346	+2.0%
1986	36,916	−1.2%
1991	37,210	+0.8%
1996	37,308	+0.3%
2001	38,015	+1.9%
2006	40,891	+7.6%
2011	41,928	+2.5%
2016	42,796	+2.1%

Home language (2016)
Language	Population	Percentage (%)
French	28,825	76%
English	2,905	8%
Other languages	6,280	16%

Mother tongue (2016)
Language	Population	Percentage (%)
French	25,555	63%
English	1,630	4%
Other languages	13,220	33%

Visible Minorities (2016)
Ethnicity	Population	Percentage (%)
Not a visible minority	28,410	68.1%
Visible minorities	13,300	31.9%

== Education ==
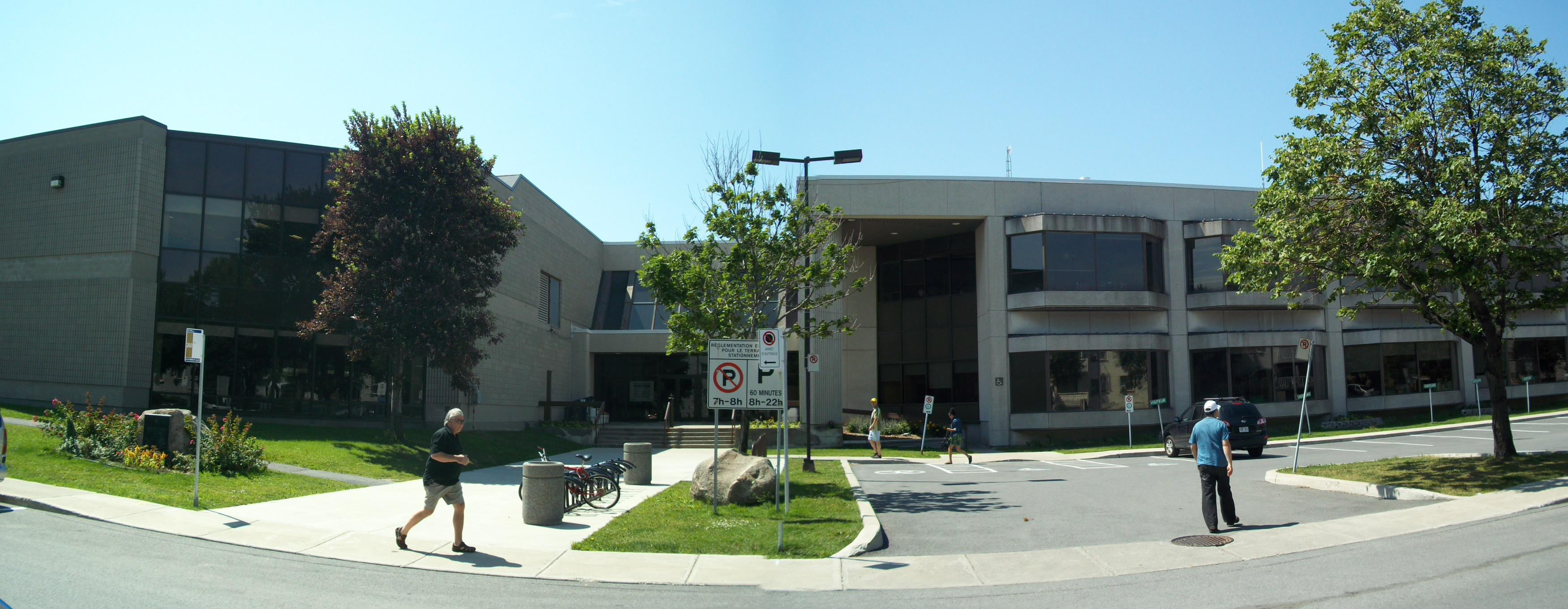
Jean Corbeil Library

The Centre de Service Scolaire de la Pointe-de-l'Île operates French-language public schools. The two secondary school is the École secondaire d'Anjouand ``École secondaire Irma-LeVasseur``.

Primary schools

- Albatros
- Cardinal-Léger
- Chénier
- Des Roseraies
- Jacques-Rousseau
- St-Joseph
- Wilfrid-Pelletier

The English Montreal School Board operates Anglophone public schools:

- Dalkeith Elementary School

The borough has two libraries of the Montreal Public Libraries Network: Haut-Anjou and Jean-Corbeil.

== See also ==
- List of former cities in Quebec
- Municipal reorganization in Quebec
