= Joyce Mansour =

Egyptian-French artist

- Born: Joyce Patricia Adès; 25 July 1928; Bowden, England
- Died: 27 August 1986 (aged 58); Paris, France
- Known for: Poetry
- Movement: Surrealism

Joyce Mansour, née Joyce Patricia Adès, (25 July 1928 – 27 August 1986), was an Egyptian-French author, notable as a surrealist poet. She became the best known surrealist female poet, author of 16 books of poetry, as well as a number of important prose and theatre pieces.

== Biography ==
Mansour was born in Bowden in England, to a Syrian-Jewish family originally from Aleppo, and lived in Cheshire for a month. During her youth, Mansour excelled as a runner and a high jumper. She also competed in equestrian competitions. before her parents moved the family to Cairo, Egypt.

Mansour first came in contact with Parisian surrealism while still living in Cairo where she met surrealist Georges Henein. She moved to Paris in 1953, at the age of 25. In 1947, her first marriage at the age of 19 ended after six months when her husband died. Her second marriage was to Samir Mansour in 1949 and they divided their time between Cairo and Paris. Mansour began to write in French.They befriended the french writer and poet André Breton, the co-founder, leader, and principal theorist of surrealism.

She died of cancer in Paris in 1986.

== Career ==
Mansour’s first published collection of poems, titled: Cris, was published in Paris in 1953 by Pierre Seghers. This collection of work references male and female anatomy in explicit language that was unusual for the time. Religious language can also be found. However, it is inverted, replacing what would be Christ with the lover. References of Egyptian mythology are also present in Cris. Mansour references the White Goddess as well as Hathor.

In 1954, Joyce Mansour became involved with the surrealist movement after Jean-Louise Bédouin wrote a review praising Cris in Médium: Communication surréaliste that May. Joyce Mansour actively participated in the second wave of surrealism in Paris. Her apartment was a popular meeting place for members of the surrealist group. L'exécution du testament du Marquis de Sade, the performance piece by Jean Benoît took place in Mansour’s apartment.

She collaborated with representatives such as Pierre Alechinsky, Enrico Baj, Hans Bellmer, Gerardo Chávez, Jorge Camacho, Ted Joans, Pierre Molinier, Reinhoud d'Haese and Max Walter Svanberg.

== Work ==
=== Poetry ===
- « Cris», Ed. Seghers, París, 1953
- « Déchirures», Les Éditions de Minuit, París, 1955
- « Rapaces», Ed. Seghers, París, 1960
- « Carré blanc», Le Soleil Noir, París, 1966
- « Les Damnations», Ed. Visat, París, 1967
- « Phallus et momies», Éd. Daily Bul, 1969
- « Astres et désastres», 1969
- « Anvil Flowers», 1970
- « Prédelle Alechinsky à la ligne», 1973
- « Pandemonium», 1976
- « Faire signe au machiniste», 1977
- « Sens interdits», 1979
- « Le Grand Jamais», 1981
- « Jasmin d'hiver», 1982
- « Flammes immobiles», 1985
- « Trous noirs», Ed. La pierre d'Alun, Bruxelles, 1986 (illustrated by fundamental Peruvian painter Gerardo Chávez)
- Emerald Wounds: Selected Poems, published by City Lights Books. 7/11/2023. ISBN 9780872869011.
- in the glittering maw: selected poems, published by world poetry books. 2024 ISBN 978-1-954218-21-5

=== Prose ===
- « Les Gisants satisfaits», Jean-Jacques Pauvert, París, 1958
- « Jules César», Éd. Pierre Seghers, París, 1956
- « Le Bleu des fonds», Le Soleil Noir, París, 1968
- « Ça», Le Soleil Noir, París, 1970
- « Histoires nocives», Gallimard, París, 1973

== Bibliography ==
- Marie-Francine Mansour, Une vie surréaliste, Joyce Mansour, complice d'André Breton, France-Empire, 2014.
- Mohsen L Belasy, The Tuberose Baby Girl, Sulfur Editions, 2025.
