= St. John Berchmans Church =

St. John Berchmans Church or St. Jan Berchmans Church may refer to:

- St. Jan Berchmans Church, Brussels, in Etterbeek, Brussels, Belgium
- Saint-Jean-Berchmans Church, in Montreal, Canada
- Immacolata al Tiburtino or Santa Maria Immacolata e San Giovanni Berchmans, Rome, Italy
- Cathedral of St. John Berchmans (Shreveport, Louisiana), United States
- St. John Berchmans Parish church, Logan Square, Chicago, Illinois, United States

== See also ==
- John Berchmans
- St John Berchmans College
- St John Berchmans University College, Heverlee
