= Annie Le Brun =

French writer, poet and literary critic (1942–2024)

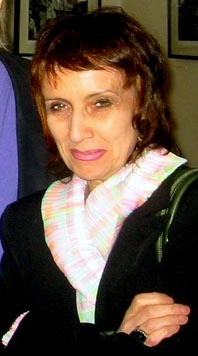
- Le Brun in 2009
- Born: 15 August 1942; Rennes, German-occupied-France
- Died: 29 July 2024 (aged 81)
- Occupations: Writer, poet, literary critic

Annie Le Brun (15 August 1942 – 29 July 2024) was a French writer, poet and literary critic.

== Life and career ==
Le Brun was born on 15 August 1942. While still a student, she discovered the shock of surrealism; She read André Breton's Nadja first, hand copying his Mad Love and the Anthology of Black Humor. Shortly after, in 1963, she met Breton himself, and took part in the activities of the surrealist movement until 1969, upon the dissolution of the group. Later, against what she considered to be the programmed liquidation of singularity, love and distraction, she confided that "with the surrealists one breathed, if only to discover the multiplicity of horizons what will have opened this unique attempt in the twentieth century to think all man?" This is how she stood in the wake of surrealism, embracing her quest for "convulsive beauty" and her lyrical insurrection.

In 1972, she found a collective activity around Editions Now founded by Pierre Peuchmaurd, with the poet and playwright Radovan Ivsic, who became her companion, as well as Georges Goldfayn, Gerard Legrand and the painter Toyen. The latter had illustrated in 1967 her first poetic book Sur le champ. In these years, she wrote and published several other collections, which will be collected in 2004 in a single volume, under the title Ombre pour ombre. During this prolific period of creation, she co-authored, among other collections and essays, three hybrid works in which her poetic writing is combined with illustrations – both photographic and plastics – from different artists: The Crossing of the Alps, co-written in 1972 with Radovan Ivšić and illustrated by the photographs of the Italian sculptor Fabio De Sanctis; Nearby the nomads, a poetic collection illustrated by Toyen in 1972; and finally Annular Moon, poetic story also illustrated by Toyen in 1977.

In 1977, with her essay "Let loose everything," then in 1988 with Vagit-prop, Annie Le Brun fiercely criticized what she considered to be the imposture of so-called "feminist" ideology, a "caricature of totalitarianism thinking," in fact the "insidious reappearance of moralism and silliness that characterizes the militant feminist point of view on sexuality ... under the guise of an objective inquiry". Evelyne Sullerot's book Le fait féminine (Fayard, 1978) and Marie-Françoise Hans and Gilles Lapouge's Les Femmes, pornography, and erotism (Ed de le Seuil, 1978), were inspirations, but also figures such as: Simone de Beauvoir, Marguerite Duras, Benoite Groult, Germaine Greer, Gisele Halimi, Elisabeth Badinter, Annie Leclerc, Xaviere Gauthier, Luce Irigaray, and Helene Cixous. None were spared, and in contrast to their "ideological lures", "cretinizing sorority" and "staggering rage of power", which she describes as "Stalinism in petticoats", Annie Le Brun writes, for example:

Morality and nonsense, which, far from being inherent to the feminine word, arise as soon as we want to reject all crime on the other sex "; it is to be regretted "to hear repeated everywhere today as an established fact that there are no voyeur women, that there are no sadistic women, and last but not least, but is the ba ba of the neo-feminist blindness, that the look is a phallic function.

In her pamphlets on this feminist recruitment, a militancy according to her close to the ideological terror, she rejects the logic of identity and power that mutilates the imaginary lover and locks women in the discourse of the same, in a conformation to roles (wife mother, working woman, etc.), to the detriment of individuality. In her revolt against the shackles of this "ideological terrorism of femellitude", which continues the alienation of women, but also against all systems, ideologies, parties, Annie Le Brun considered her book as "a call for desertion".

In The Castles of Subversion (1982), Annie Le Brun examined the Gothic novel and the fantasty noir novel, exploring the imaginary landscapes of these dramas of the horrible. She read in these works, at a time dominated by the discourse of Reason, the emergence of a poetic violence and a critique of Enlightenment philosophy, announcing Romanticism.

In 2014, she curated a show at the Musée d'Orsay, on the death of Marquis de Sade.

Le Brun died on 21 July 2024, at the age of 81.

== Works ==
=== Poetry ===
- Sur le champ, illustrated with six collages et three pointes-sèches by Toyen, Paris, Éditions surréalistes, 1967.
- Les mots font l'amour, citations surréalistes, Paris, Éric Losfeld, 1970.
- Les Pâles et fiévreux après-midi des villes, Paris, éditions Maintenant, 1972.
- La Traversée des Alpes, avec Fabio De Sanctis et Radovan Ivsic, Rome, éditions Maintenant, 1972.
- Tout près, les nomades, avec une pointe-sèche de Toyen, Paris, éditions Maintenant, 1972.
- Les Écureuils de l'orage, Paris, éditions Maintenant, 1974.
- Annulaire de lune, illustré avec six dessins et trois pointes-sèches par Toyen, Paris, éditions Maintenant, 1977.
- Ombre pour ombre, recueil des ouvrages précédents, Paris, Gallimard, 2004.

=== Essays ===
- L'Humour noir, in Entretiens sur le surréalisme, edited by Ferdinand Alquié, Paris-La Haye, éd. Mouton, 1968.
- Lâchez tout, Paris, Le Sagittaire, 1977.
- Les Châteaux de la subversion, Paris, Jean-Jacques Pauvert and Garnier-Frères, 1982; re-edition. Paris, Gallimard, coll. " Folio essais ", 1986.
- Le Sentiment de la nature à la fin du XXe siècle, with photographs of Petar Dabac, Paris, éd. Atelier, 1982.
- À distance, Paris, Jean-Jacques Pauvert in éd. Carrère, 1984.
- Soudain un bloc d'abîme, Sade, Paris, Jean-Jacques Pauvert, 1986; re-edition. Paris, Gallimard, coll. " Folio essais ", 2014.
- Appel d'air, Paris, réflexion sur la poésie, Paris, Plon, 1988; re-edition. Paris, Verdier/poche, 2011.
- Sade, aller et détours, Paris, Plon, 1989.
- Petits et grands théâtres du Marquis de Sade s/d Annie Le Brun, Paris Art Center, 1989.
- Vagit-prop, Lâchez tout et autres textes, Paris: Ramsay/Jean-Jacques Pauvert, 1990; re-edition. Paris, Éditions du Sandre, 2010.
- Comme c'est petit un éléphant !, postface au « Surmâle » of Alfred Jarry, Paris: Ramsay/Jean-Jacques Pauvert, 1990.
- Qui vive. Considérations actuelles sur l'inactualité du surréalisme, Paris, Ramsay/Jean-Jacques Pauvert, 1990.
- Perspective dépravée, Bruxelles, La Lettre volée, 1991; re-edition. Paris, éditions du Sandre, 2011.
- Surréalisme et subversion poétique, Stanford, University Lecture Series, 1991.
- Les Assassins et leurs miroirs. Réflexion à propos de la catastrophe yougoslave, Paris, Jean-Jacques Pauvert / Terrain Vague, 1993.
- Vingt Mille Lieues sous les mots, Raymond Roussel, Paris, Jean-Jacques Pauvert, 1994.
- De l'inanité de la littérature (recueil de textes critiques), Paris, Jean-Jacques Pauvert in Belles Lettres, 1994.
- Pour Aimé Césaire, Paris, Jean-Michel Place, 1994.
- Statue cou coupé (dans le débat à propos de négritude et créolité), Paris, Jean-Michel Place, 1996.
- Jean Benoît, monographie, Paris, Filippachi, 1996.
- De l'éperdu, Paris, Stock, 2000; re-edition. Paris, Gallimard, " Folio essais ", 2005.
- Du trop de réalité, Paris, Stock, 2000; re-edition. Paris, Gallimard, " Folio essais ", 2004.
- Pour ne pas en finir avec la représentation, with five photographs of Jindrich Styrsky, Strelec, Prague, 2003.
- On n'enchaîne pas les volcans, Paris, Gallimard, 2006.
- Leonora Carrington, la mariée du vent, collective work with text by Homero Aridjis, André Breton, Max Ernst, Annie Le Brun, Octavio Paz et Delmari Romero Keith, Paris, coédition Gallimard/Maison de l'Amérique latine, 2008.
- Les Châteaux de la subversion, suivi de Soudain un bloc d'abîme, Sade, re-edition. Paris, Gallimard, coll. " Tel ", 2010.
- Si rien avait une forme, ce serait cela, Paris, Gallimard, 2010
- Ailleurs et autrement, Paris, Gallimard, coll. " Arcades ", 2011.
- Perspective dépravée. Entre catastrophe réelle et catastrophe imaginaire, Paris, éditions du Sandre, 2011.
- Les Arcs-en-ciel du noir : Victor Hugo, Paris, Gallimard, coll. " Art et artistes ", 2012.
- Cibles, avec Gilbert Titeux, Paris, Gallimard – Le Promeneur, 2013.
- L'Ange du bizarre. Le Romantisme noir : de Goya à Max Ernst (collective), with Felix Krämer, Johannes Grave, Hubertus Kohle, Paris, Musée d'Orsay – Hatje Cantz Verlag, Ostfildern, 2013.
- Sade : attaquer le soleil, Paris, coédition Musée d'Orsay / Gallimard, collection " Livres d'Art ", 2014.
- Radovan Ivsic et la forêt insoumise, coédition Gallimard/Musée d'art contemporain de Zagreb, 2015.
- Ce qui n'a pas de prix, Paris, Stock, collection " Essais – Documents ", 2018.
