= Musée de la Sculpture en Plein Air =

Collection of outdoor sculptures in Paris, France

Coordinates: 48°50′48″N 02°21′42″E

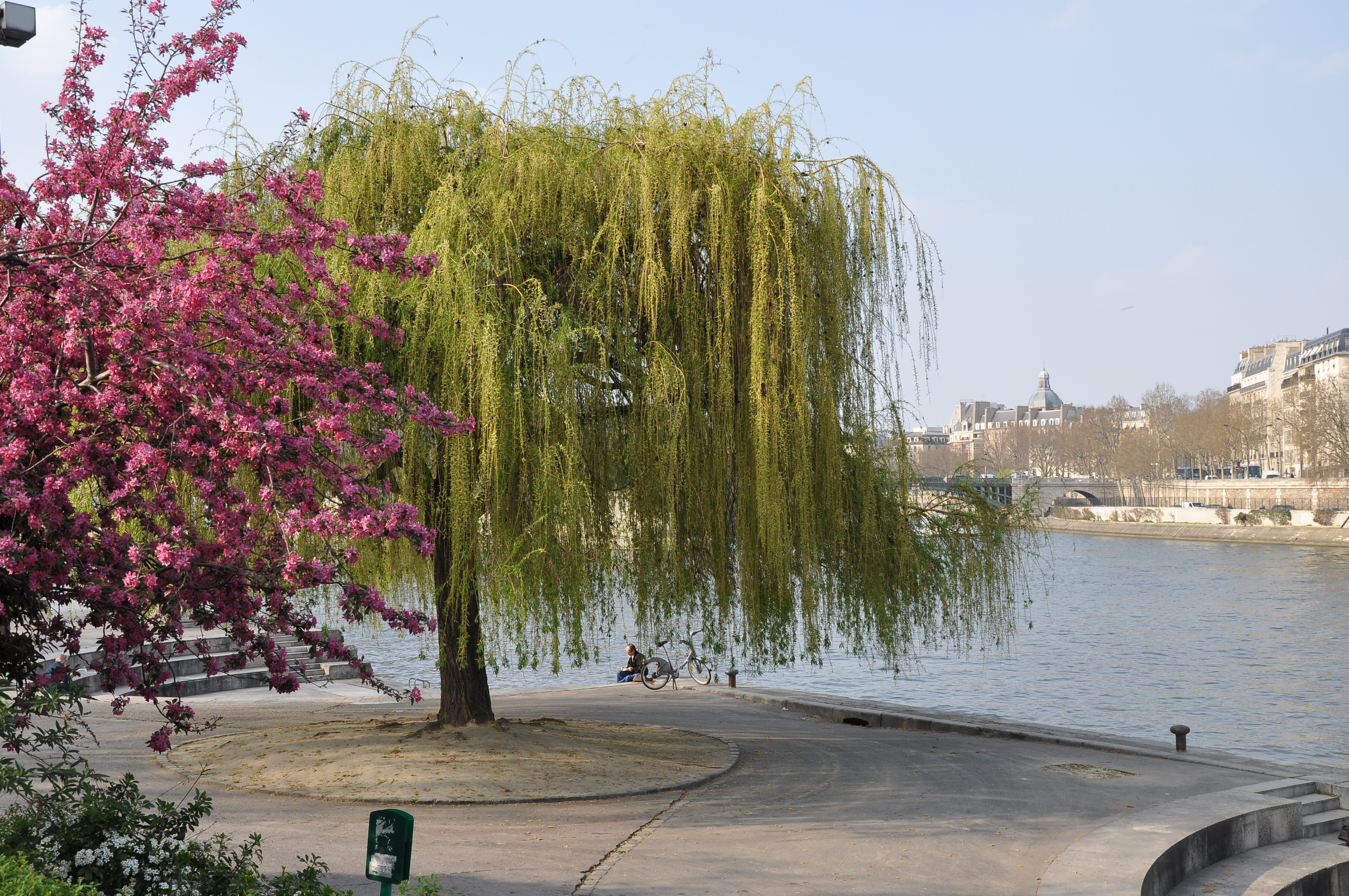
Paris 5e Jardin Tino Rossi 001

The Musée de la Sculpture en Plein Air (French pronunciation: [myze də la skyltyʁ ɑ̃ plɛn‿ɛʁ]) is a collection of outdoor sculpture located on the banks of the Seine in the 5th arrondissement, Paris, France. The museum opens free of charge.

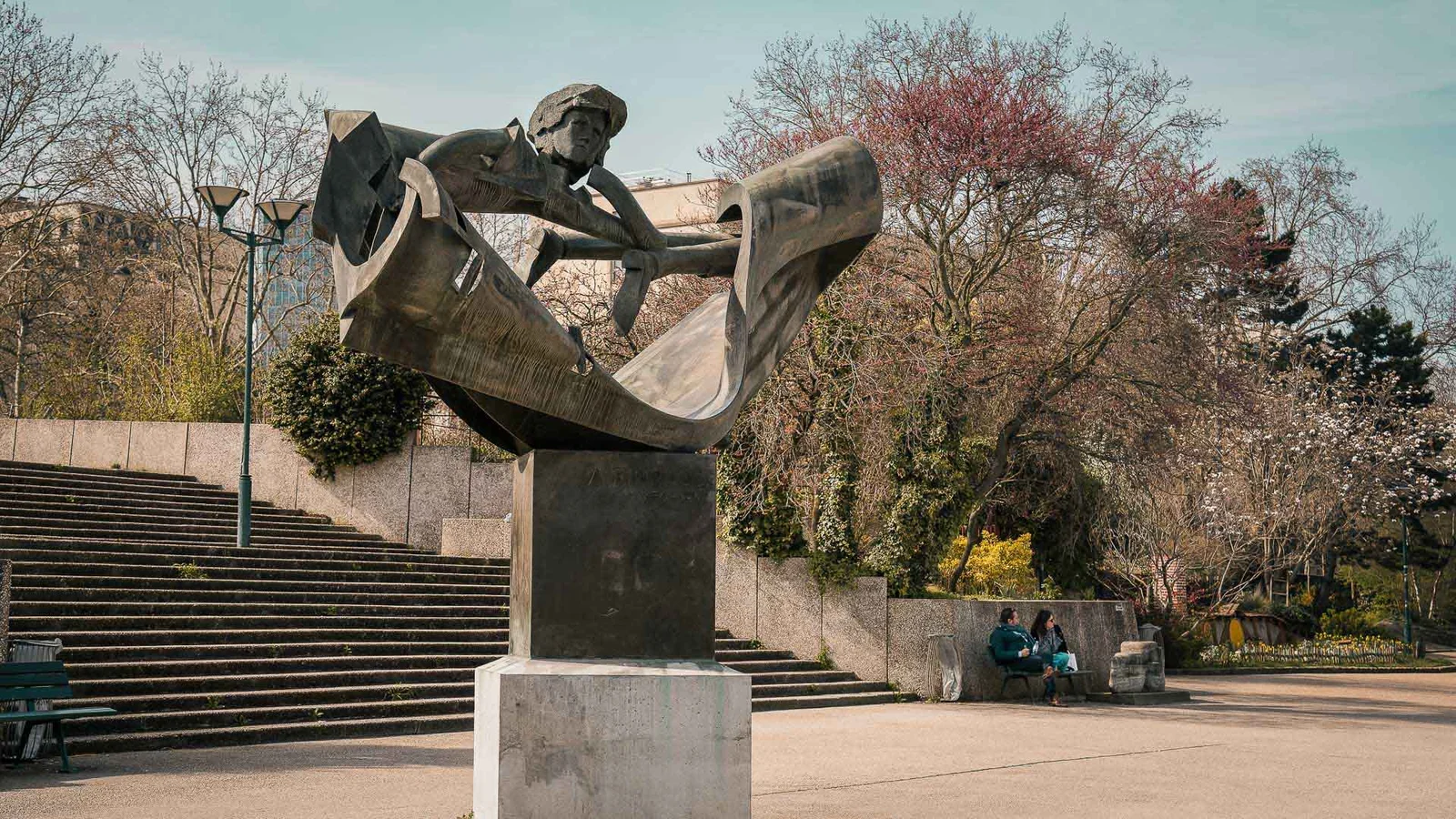
Contemporary sculpture exhibited at the Outdoor Sculpture Museum.

The museum was created in 1980 in the Jardin Tino Rossi to display sculptures from the second half of the twentieth century. It stretches some 600 meters along the Quai Saint-Bernard beside the Jardin des Plantes, between Place Valhubert and Gare d'Austerlitz to just east of Pont de Sully. The museum currently contains over fifty sculptures, including pieces by Alexander Archipenko, Jean Arp, César Baldaccini, and Constantin Brâncuși, as well as the following pieces:

- Augustin Cardenas (1927-), La Grande Fenêtre, 1974
- Marta Colvin (1915-), Le Grand Signe, 1970
- Guy de Rougemont (1935-), Interpénétration des deux espaces, 1975
- Reinhoud d'Haese (Reinhoud) (1928-), Melmoth, 1966
- Marino di Teana (1920-2012), Structure architecturale, 1973
- Étienne-Martin (Étienne Martin) (1913–1995), Demeurre 1, 1954–1958
- Sorel Etrog (1933-), Fiesole, 1965–1967
- Albert Feraud (1921-), Sans titre, 1979
- Yoshikuni Iida (1923-), Shining Wings, 1981
- Jean-Robert Ipoustéguy (1920-), Hydrophage, 1975
- Micha Laury (1946-), Mind Accumulation, 1988
- Aglaé Libéraki (1923-1985), Abellio, 1971–1973
- Liuba (1923-), Animal 82, 1982
- Liuba (1923-), Stèle, 1977
- Bernard Pagès (1940-), Sans titre, 1988
- Marta Pan (1923-), Sculpture, 1969
- Ruggero Pazzi (1927-), Sculpture, 1979
- Antoine Poncet (1928-), Ochicagogo, 1979
- Nicolas Schöffer (1912–1992), Chronos 10, 1978
- François Stahly (1911-), Neptune II, 1969

== See also ==
- List of museums in Paris
- Sculpture Park Engelbrecht
