= God's Doorkeeper: St. André of Montreal =

2010 film

- Directed by: Mary Rose Bacani
- Country of origin: Canada
- Original languages: English; French

Production
- Producer: Gita Hosek
- Running time: 60 minutes

Original release
- Release: October 17, 2010

God's Doorkeeper: St. André of Montreal is a 2010 television documentary film about St. André Bessette. It was produced by Salt and Light Catholic Media Foundation (Salt + Light), a Canadian-based media initiative and registered charity that arose from World Youth Day 2002. The documentary was later released on DVD.

Directed by a team of filmmakers at Salt + Light, the documentary features interviews and footage filmed in Quebec, New Hampshire, Indiana, Oregon and Rome. Interviews include those in the religious order who continue André's legacy.

On October 17, 2010, Br. André became the first Canadian-born male saint. The majority of God's Doorkeeper premiered on Salt + Light television two days earlier in anticipation of André's canonization. Footage of the canonization itself was shot and included in the final version of the film.

== Content summary ==
This documentary includes commentary from people who knew Br. André and continue his work today; interviews from Montreal, Rome, and different parts of the United States; reflection from Fr. Tom Rosica, CSB, on the perennial relevance of Br. André; and footage of the events of Br. André's road to sainthood (beatification, canonization, and special celebrations in Rome and Montreal).
