= Mimi Parent =

Canadian artist (1924–2005)

- Parent c. 1948
- Born: Marie Parent; September 8, 1924; Montreal, Canada
- Died: June 14, 2005 (aged 80); Villars-sur-Ollon, Switzerland
- Occupation: Artist
- Spouse: Jean Benoît (m. 1948)
- Father: Lucien Parent

Mimi Parent (born Marie Parent; September 8, 1924 – June 14, 2005) was a Canadian surrealist artist. For many years she lived and worked in Paris, France. Her art is known for its symbolism, and the metaphorical use of existing objects, including human hair.

== Early life ==
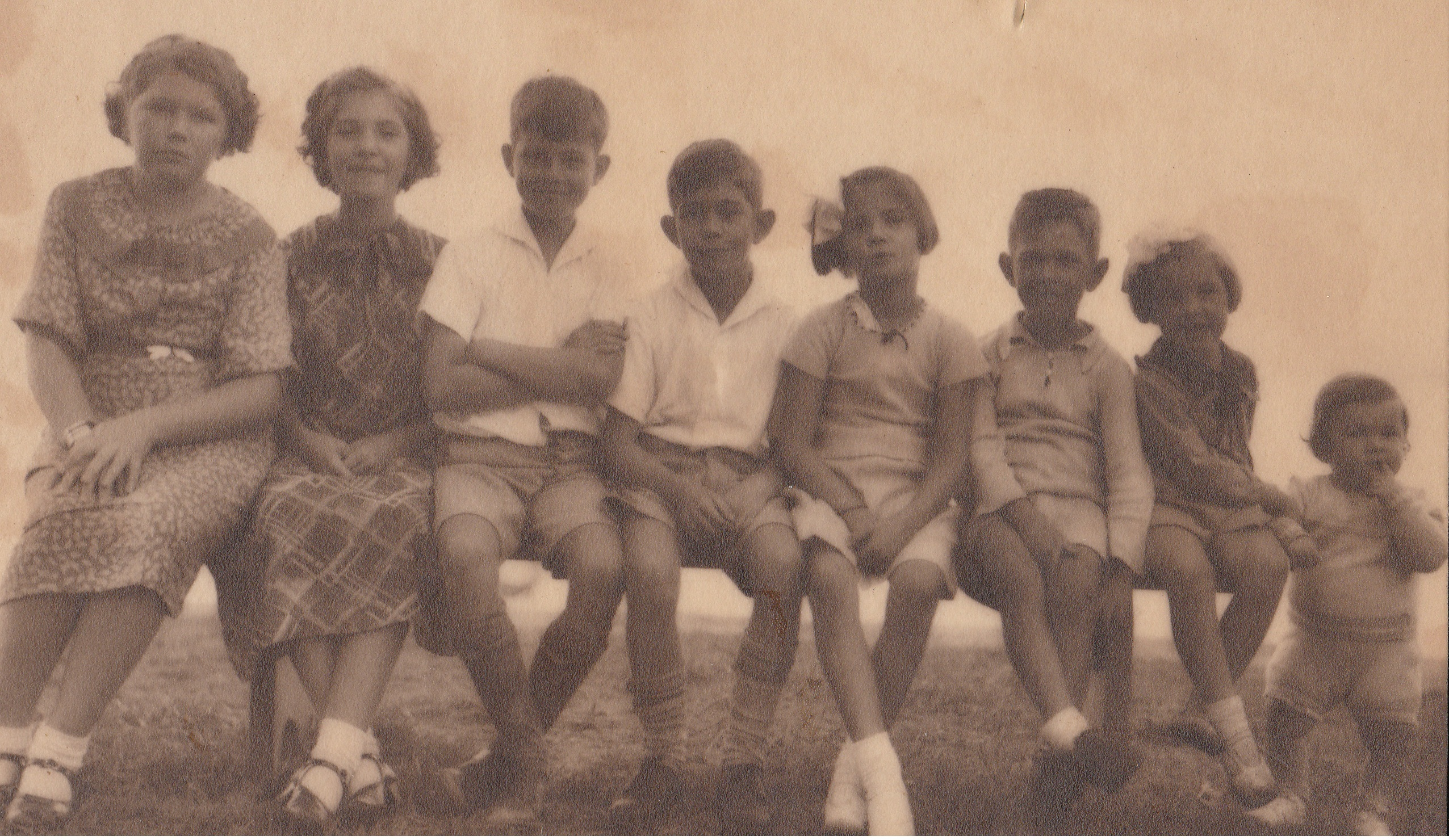
Lucien Parent's children.

Marie Parent was born in Montreal, Canada. She was the eighth of the nine children of architect Lucien Parent. Between 1942 and 1947 she studied art at the École des Beaux-Arts de Montréal where she met her future husband, fellow art student Jean Benoît. While she was there, she studied with Alfred Pellan who influenced Parent's work. It was noted by some that she was an unruly student. Parent was later expelled from the school after joining a controversial artists' group, called Prisme d’yeux.

== Career ==
In Canada, Parent identified with the Surrealist movement, as well as automatism. In 1959 she became a member of the Paris Surrealist Group. Parent associated with other surrealist artists, such as Andre Breton and Marcel Duchamp. Parent participated in the International Surrealist Exhibition, devoted to Eros. During 1964–1967, Parent made Anti-Gaullist posters, and she was involved in protests in Paris in May 1968. Parent illustrated books for Guy Cabanel and Jose Pierre.

Parent was most known for her 3D tableaux boxes. In these boxes, Parent would include figures and elements relating to mythology, folklore, and her unconscious imagination. Parent often incorporated elements of lunar and solar forces, representing masculinity and femininity. Parent was raised in a Catholic household, and her work showed influences of her faith and eroticism. Parent incorporated materials such as human hair, in her art objects. One of her well known pieces Maitresse, 1996, was a whip, with the lash being composed of two braids of her hair.

From September 24 to October 4, 1947, she had her first one-woman exhibition at the Dominion Gallery in Montreal which received favorable reviews from Montreal and Ottawa newspapers (Note: the Montreal Gazette, the Montreal Standard and the Montreal Herald - along with the Ottawa Citizen.) The Montreal Herald and the Ottawa Citizen spoke of her role as the first woman in the Prisme d'yeux group and of Alfred Pellan, her teacher along with Jacques de Tonnancour at the École des beaux-arts de Montréal. Pellan and Jacques de Tonnancour wrote brief notes about her in the catalogue of the show. In 1947, she received the Cézanne medal. It included funds which allowed her to travel.

That year, she married Benoit, and the two moved to Paris. On December 2, 1959, she participated in Jean Benoit's performance, L’Execution du testament du marquis de Sade, a ceremony in which Benoit brands the letters SADE in his chest while dressed with accessories representing Eros and Thanatos. This ceremony established the two as centers of the Parisian surrealist group, led by Andre Breton. Between 1964 and 1967, they participated together in many soirees at the Le Ranelagh theatre in Paris, and in 1965, exhibited at the "L'Ecart absolu" exposition. She exhibited at the "Surrealist intrusion into the Enchanter's Domain" in New York in 1960 and in 1966 had a solo exhibition at the "Maya" gallery in Brussels. She also exhibited in Chicago, London, Lausanne and Frankfurt. She assisted with the organization of the "Exposition inteRnatiOnale du Surréalisme" (EROS), which ran in Paris from December 1959 to the following February; although this is often attributed to Duchamp, she came up with the ideas for the exhibit catalogue, titled Boite Alerte – Missives Lascives, which was presented as a green box into which ideas could be 'posted'.

Parent lived and worked in Paris, France and continued creating art in her later years. Following Andre Breton's death and the Paris Surrealist Group's disbandment, Parent went on to create what she referred to as “picture objects”. These included a mix between found objects sculptures and paintings. Then, her art medium turned to ink drawings. She had many solo exhibitions throughout her life (Galerie André-François Petit, Paris, 1984; Museum Bochum, 1984; Noyers-sur-Serein, 1992) and was active as an artist until the end of her days. Her most notable shows included Femininmasculin, at the Centre Georges Pompidou in Paris in 1995, La femme Et Le Surrealisme, in Lausanne in 1987, Surrealism: Desire Unbound, at the Tate Modern in London in 2001 and Paris And The Surrealists, in Barcelona in 2005. In the fall of 1998, Galerie 1900–2000 in Paris organized a retrospective of her work and in 2004, the Musée national des beaux-arts du Québec held a retrospective in which she and Jean Benoit were the subjects. She died June 14, 2005, in Switzerland and her ashes were scattered by Benoît at Château de Lacoste, the estate of the Marquis de Sade in Haute-Provence.
