= Radovan Ivšić =

Croatian poet (1921–2009)

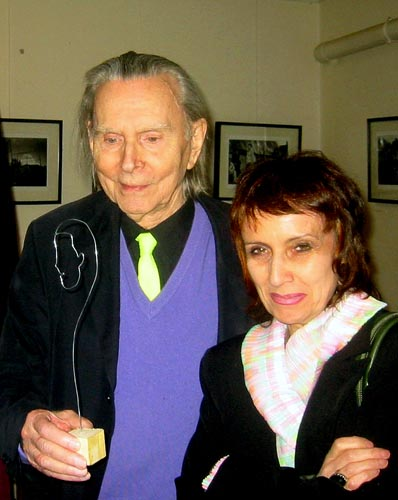
- Radovan Ivšić and Annie Le Brun
- Born: June 22, 1921; Zagreb, Kingdom of Serbs, Croats, and Slovenes
- Died: December 25, 2009 (aged 88); Paris, France
- Education: University of Zagreb
- Occupations: Poet, dramatist, translator
- Spouse: Annie Le Brun
- Relatives: Stjepan Ivšić (father)
- Writing career
- Period: 20th century
- Genres: Poetry, drama, essays
- Notable work: King Gordogan
- Literary movement: Surrealism

Radovan Ivšić (June 22, 1921 – December 25, 2009) was a Croatian writer, best known for his drama Kralj Gordogan and book of poems Crno. Ivšić spent his life uncompromisingly in the spirit of liberty. Such values brought him close to the surrealist movement. He was a friend of André Breton and Toyen and was one of the signers of the last Manifeste du surréalisme, 1955. His best-known statements are “Never give up your dreams” and paraphrase “We are our dreams”.

== Biography ==
He was a son of Stjepan Ivšić, a Croatian linguist, Slavist, accentologist, and Rector of University of Zagreb (1940–43). After Classical High School and graduation from the University of Zagreb, Faculty of Humanities and Social Sciences, in 1954 he relocated to Paris, where he remained for the rest of his life.

=== Controversy ===
The fascist prime minister of Croatia during World War II, Ante Pavelić, personally ordered confiscation of Ivšić's first book, Narcis. His theatrical play Kralj Gordogan was banned in Croatia by both the fascist and communist dictatorships until 1979. Ivšić criticized cheap politics, communism, and false surrealism. He was a critic of Miroslav Krleža, often regarded as the greatest Croatian writer of the 20th century. Ivšić rejected all awards and medals.

== Selected works ==
- Daha (drama), 1941
- Narcis (poem), 1942
- Kralj Gordogan (drama), 1943
- Kapetan Oliver (drama), 1944
- Vodnik pobjednik (drama), 1944
- Snjeguljica (drama), 1948
- Tanke (collection of poems), 1954
- Akvarij (drama), 1954
- Mavena (collection of poems), 1960
- Mavena (collection of poems), 1972
- Autour ou dedans (collection of poems), 1974
- Crno (collection of poems), 1974
- Bunar u kuli (collection of poems), 1974
- Aixaia ili Moći reći (drama), 1983
- Sunčani grad (drama)
