= André Bessette =

Canadian Catholic brother and saint (1845–1937)

Saint André Bessette C.S.C.
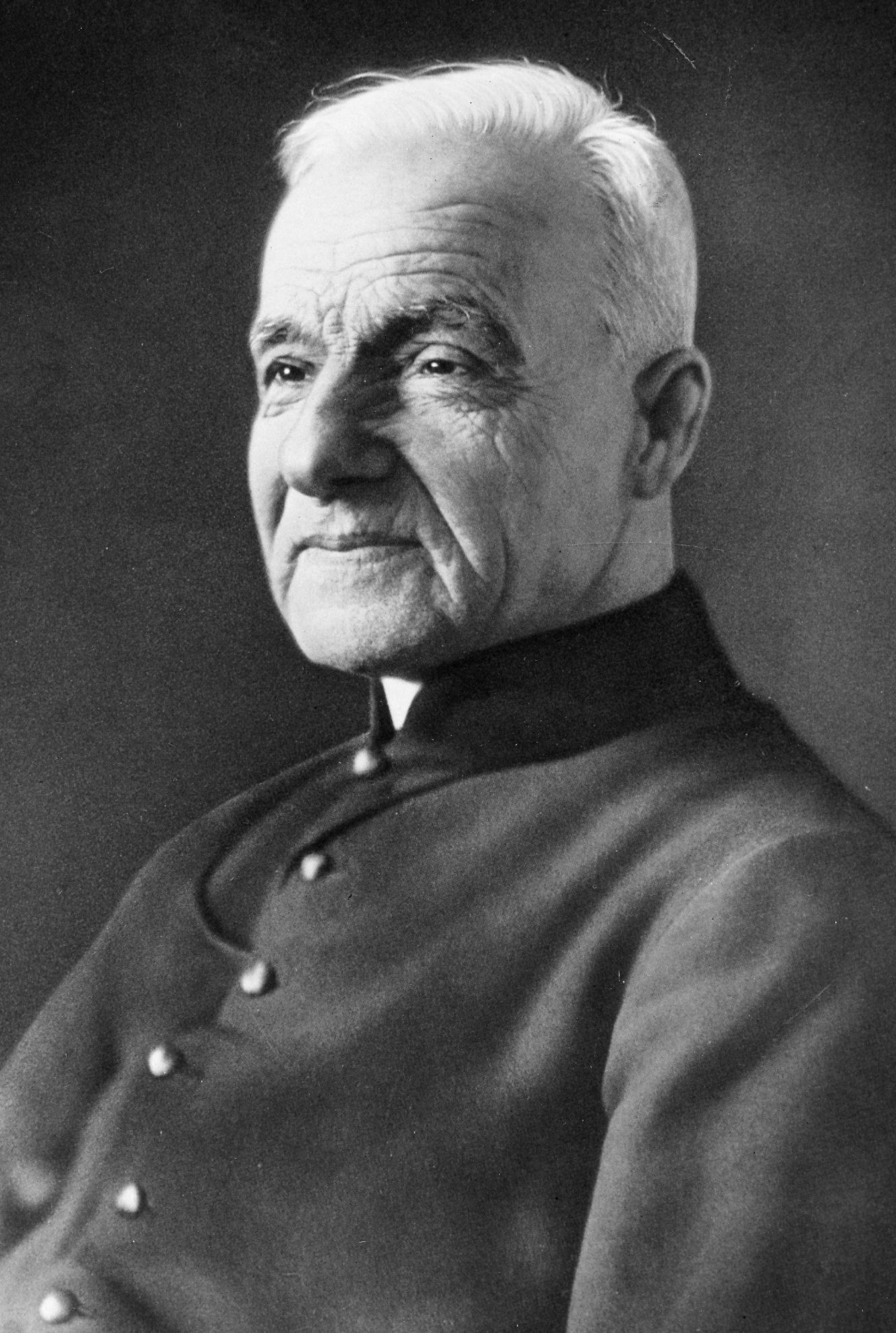

Lay Brother Confessor
- Born: August 9, 1845; Mont-Saint-Grégoire, Canada East, Province of Canada
- Died: January 6, 1937 (aged 91); Montreal, Quebec, Dominion of Canada
- Venerated in: Catholic Church
- Beatified: May 23, 1982, Saint Peter's Square, Vatican City, by Pope John Paul II
- Canonized: October 17, 2010, Saint Peter's Square, Vatican City by Pope Benedict XVI
- Major shrine: Saint Joseph's Oratory; Montreal, Quebec, Canada
- Feast: January 6 (January 7 in Canada)

André Bessette, C.S.C. (born Alfred; 9 August 1845 – 6 January 1937), commonly known as Brother André (French: Frère André) and since his canonization as Saint André of Montreal, was a lay brother of the Congregation of Holy Cross and a significant figure of the Catholic Church among French Canadians. He is credited with thousands of reported healings associated with his pious devotion to Saint Joseph.

Bessette, who founded Saint Joseph's Oratory in Montreal, Canada's largest church, was declared venerable in 1978 and was beatified by Pope John Paul II in 1982. Pope Benedict XVI approved the decree of sainthood for Bessette on 19 February 2010, with the formal canonization taking place on 17 October 2010. He is the first Canadian living after Confederation to be canonized.

== Early life ==
He was born Alfred Bessette in Mont-Saint-Grégoire, Canada East (Québec), a small town situated 40 kilometres (25 mi) southeast of Montreal. His father, Isaac Bessette, was a carpenter and lumberman, while his mother, Clothilde Foisy Bessette, saw to the education of the children. Bessette was the eighth of 12 children, four of whom died in infancy. At birth, Bessette was so frail that the curé baptized him "conditionally" in an emergency ritual the following day. In 1849, with employment scarce and his family living in poverty, Bessette's father moved to Farnham, Quebec to work as a lumberman, but was shortly thereafter killed by a falling tree. Bessette was nine years old, and his mother, at 40, remained with ten children in her care. Clothilde died of tuberculosis within three years, and Bessette became orphaned at the age of twelve.

Following his mother's death, Bessette was placed under the care of Timothée and Rosalie Nadeau of Saint-Césaire, Quebec. While with the Nadeau family, Bessette attended catechetical lessons taught by his parish's pastor, André Provençal. It was during these lessons that Bessette developed his two lifelong devotions: Saint Joseph and the Passion of Christ. In June 1858, at age 12, Bessette was confirmed by Bishop Jean-Charles Prince of the Diocese of Saint-Hyacinthe. When Bessette was 14, the Nadeaus sent him to school. However, Bessette was soon removed from school, having only learned to read and sign his name, both with difficulty. Timothée Nadeau intended to train Bessette as a labourer, seeing no need for an orphan to be educated. Bessette soon left the Nadeaus and was brought in by Louis Ouimet, the mayor of Saint-Césaire. While living with the Ouimet family, Bessette had a series of short-lived occupations, working as a farmer, tinsmith, blacksmith, wheelwright, cobbler, and baker, all of which Bessette was too physically weak to sustain. Searching for work, Bessette moved to Moosup, Connecticut at the age of 18, where he joined several of his relatives in work at textile mills across Connecticut and Rhode Island. Bessette returned to Canada in 1867 following the Canadian Confederation.

== Call to devotion ==
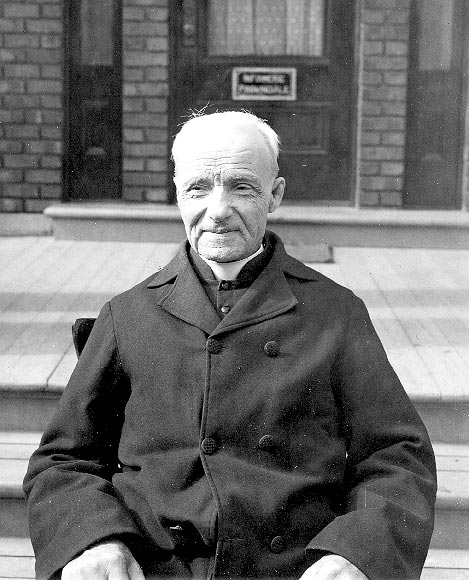
Brother André (ca. 1920)

The pastor of his parish, André Provençal, noticed the devotion and generosity of the young man. He decided to present Bessette to the Congregation of Holy Cross in Montreal, writing a note to the superior, "I'm sending you a saint." Although he was initially rejected by the order because of frail health, Archbishop Ignace Bourget of Montreal intervened on his behalf, and in 1872, Bessette was accepted and entered the novitiate of the congregation, receiving the religious name of Brother André, by which he was known for the rest of his life. He made his final vows on February 2, 1874, at the age of 28. After, Bessette became a porter at Collège Notre-Dame in Côte-des-Neiges, Quebec, and also served as sacristan, laundry worker and messenger.

While working at the college, Bessette began to minister to the sick. Biographer Leonard Foley wrote that "his great confidence in Saint Joseph inspired him to recommend the saint's devotion to all those who were afflicted." The brother also rubbed the sick with oil taken from one of the college's lamps. People claimed that they had been cured through the prayers of Bessette and Saint Joseph, and they were grateful their prayers had been heard. Bessette steadfastly refused to take any credit for these cures, even during an epidemic. Bessette's desire to see Saint Joseph honoured led him in 1904 to launch a campaign to build a chapel for that purpose.

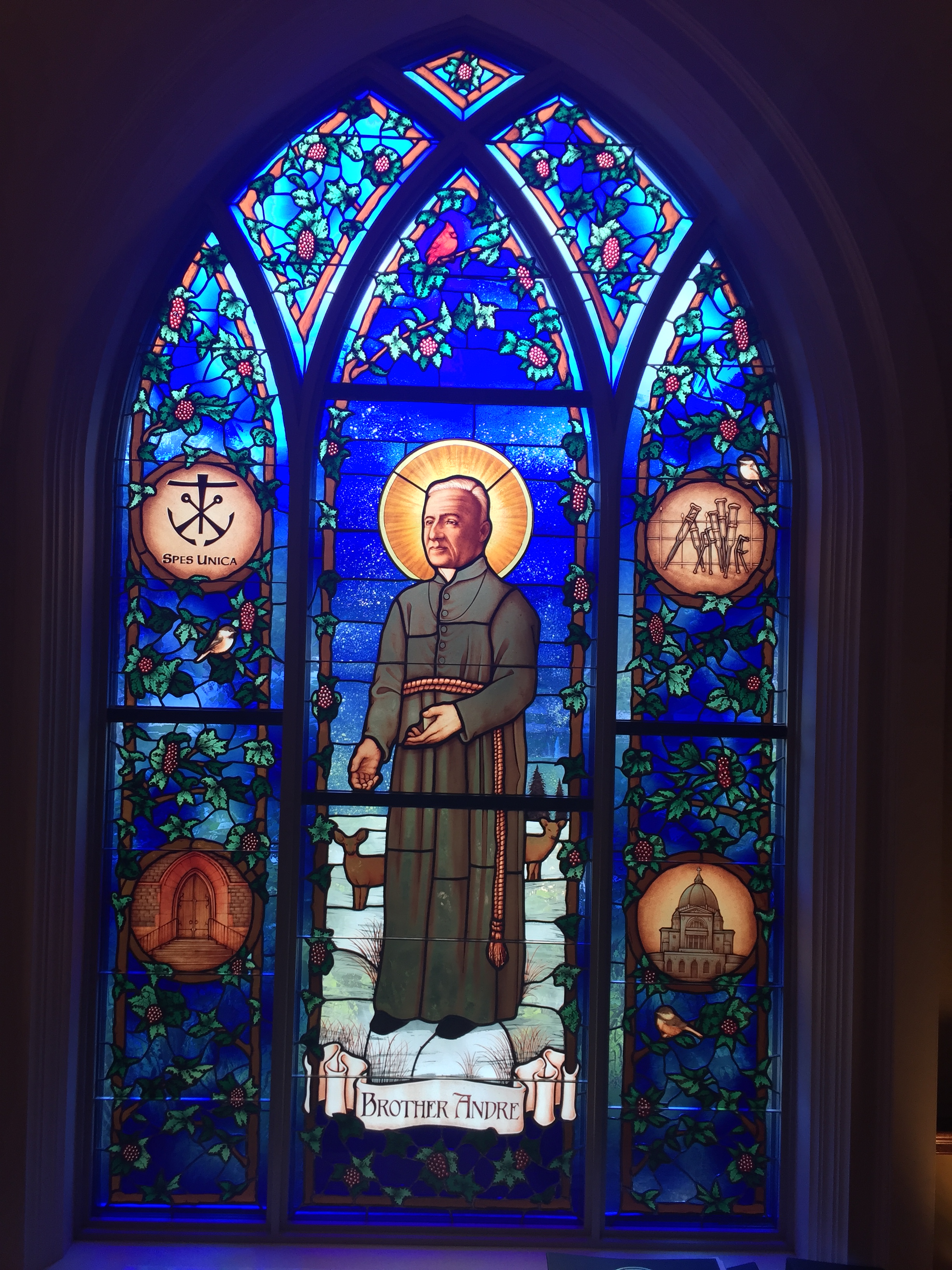
Stained glass window with Andre Bessette at Stinson Remick Chapel at the University of Notre Dame

As tensions increased at the college with so many of the sick coming to see the porter, the school officials decided that Bessette could no longer continue with his ministry. He was permitted to receive the sick in the nearby tramway station rather than the college. As his reputation spread, Bessette became quite a controversial figure. There were many religious in the Congregation of Holy Cross, teachers and parents of students at the College who supported him but many others opposed him and even considered him dangerous to the well-being of the school's reputation because they regarded him as a charlatan. Others were concerned for the good health of the children, fearing the possibility of contagion in the school spread from diseases carried by the sick who frequented Bessette.

In 1924 construction of a basilica named Saint Joseph's Oratory began on the side of the mountain, near Bessette's chapel.

== Death and path to canonization ==
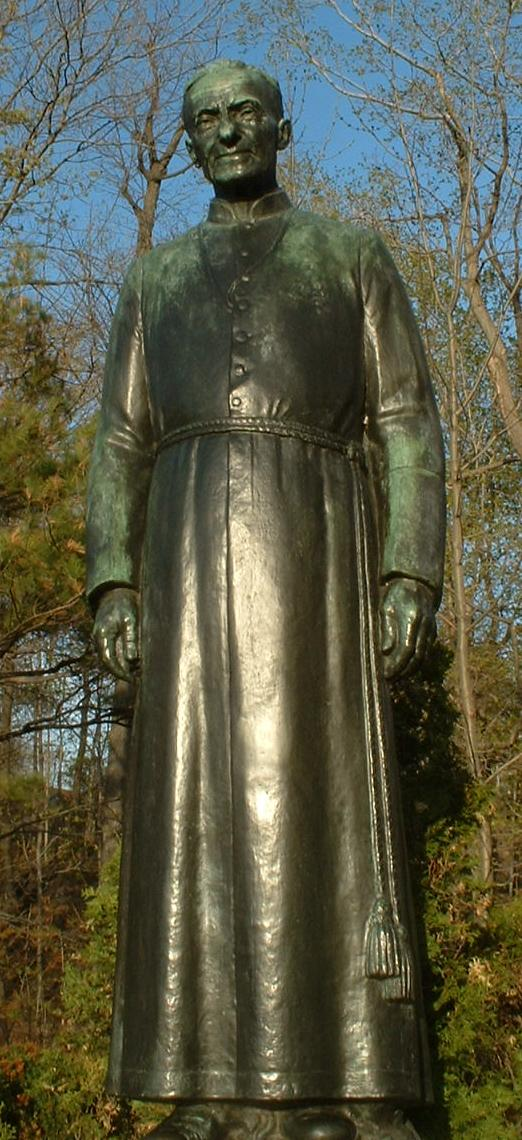
Statue of André Bessette by Joseph-Émile Brunet on the grounds of Saint Joseph's Oratory in Montreal, QC, Canada

Bessette died on January 6, 1937, at the age of 91. One million people filed past his coffin.

The remains of Bessette lie in the church he helped build. His body lies in a tomb built below the Oratory's Main Chapel, except for his heart, which is preserved in a reliquary in the same Oratory. The heart was stolen in March 1973, but was recovered in December 1974 with the help of criminal lawyer Frank Shoofey.

A cause for Bessette's beatification was opened on July 20, 1950. He was beatified by Pope John Paul II on May 23, 1982. The miracle cited in support of his beatification was the healing in 1958 of Giuseppe Carlo Audino, who suffered from cancer. Saint André is commemorated in most of the world by an optional memorial on January 6. His memorial is celebrated in Canada on January 7.

On December 19, 2009, Pope Benedict XVI promulgated a decree recognizing a second miracle at Bessette's intercession, and on October 17, 2010, formally declared sainthood for him. Bessette was the first saint of the Congregation of Holy Cross, the same religious order that founded the University of Notre Dame.

== Legacy ==
Many educational buildings were later named for Bessette, including:

- Andre Hall at St. Edward's University in Austin, Texas
- St. Brother André Catholic High School in Markham, Ontario
- École élémentaire catholique Frère André in London, Ontario
- Saint Andre Bessette Secondary School in London, Ontario
- Saint André Catholic Elementary School in Brampton, Ontario
- St. André Bessette Catholic High School in Fort Saskatchewan, Alberta
- St. André French Immersion Catholic Elementary School in Tecumseh, Ontario

Other educational namesakes include the St. Andre Scholars program at Notre Dame College Prep in Niles, Illinois. Statues of Bessette stand at Holy Cross College and the University of Notre Dame in Indiana.

Several churches have also been named for Bessette, including ones in Ecorse, Michigan, Laconia, New Hampshire, Portland, Oregon, Vaughan, Ontario, and Wilkes-Barre, Pennsylvania (now closed). There are also missions named for him in Cadiz, Philippines, Phoenix, Arizona, and York Region, Ontario.

== Bibliography ==
- Joel Schorn, God's Doorkeepers: Padre Pio, Solanus Casey and André Bessette: Servant Publications, (September 30, 2006), ISBN 978-0-86716-699-6
- Laurent Boucher, c.s.c., Brother André: the miracle man of Mount Royal: Montreal, 1997, 329 p.
- Lafrenière, Bernard, c.s.c., Brother André. According to the Witnesses, Montreal, St. Joseph 's Oratory, 1997, 212 p.
- Henri-Paul Bergeron, Brother André, Apostle of Saint Joseph: Montreal 1958
- Katherine Burton, Brother André of Mount-Royal, US: The Ave Maria press, 1942, 310 pages

== Media ==
- Brother André still with us: Le Centre Saint-Pierre and Saint Joseph's Oratory of Mount-Royal, 2004 (1 DVD – 62 minutes)
- The Greatness and Beauty of Saint Joseph's Oratory of Mount Royal: Montreal, Les Productions de la Montagne and Saint Joseph's Oratory of Mount Royal, 1995 (1 DVD, color, 26 minutes)
- By Jean-Claude Labrecque: Brother André: Montreal, Les Productions de la Montagne, 1987 (Movie, on 1 DVD, color, 88 minutes)
- God's Doorkeeper: St. André of Montreal, 2010
