= Albert Féraud =

French sculptor (1921–2008)

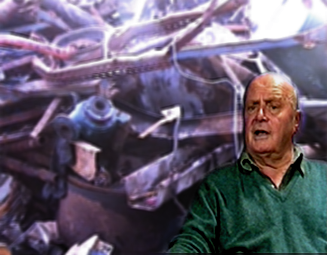
Screen capture from "L'Encyclopédie audiovisuelle de l'art contemporain"

Albert Féraud (26 November 1921 in Paris – 11 January 2008 in Bagneux) was a French sculptor, author of sans titre exposed at the Musée de la Sculpture en Plein Air in Paris and friend of French painter Annick Gendron.

Officier of the Légion d'honneur, Chevalier of the Ordre des Palmes Académiques.

== Monumental works ==
- Relieve (1957, stone), CEG of Maizières les Metz, Mosela.
- The Earth, high relief, (1960, stone) CET of Luxeuil-les-Bains, High Saona.
- Eight pillars (1961, terracotta), Carcassonne High school.
- Sculpture (1962), CA of Pontarlier.
- Sign (1964, stainless steel), ENET district number 10 (Saint-Tronc) of Marseille .
- Sign (1965, stainless steel), shopping center Empalot, Toulouse.
- Cloister Wall (1967, stainless steel), Grenoble School of Medicine and Pharmacy.
- Sculpture (1967, stainless steel), Crédit Agricole Arlés.
- Sign (1967, stainless steel), CES of Saint Barnabé, Marseille.
- Sculpture (1968, stainless steel), Humanities Faculty of Nice, with Michel Guino.
- Sculpture (1968, stainless steel), ZUP de of La Sac, Massy-Vilaine, Essonne.
- Fountain (1970, stainless steel), CET of Loudun, Vienne.
- Sign (1970, stainless steel), CET of Saint-Étienne-du-Rouvray, Seine-Maritime.
- Chapel Door (1970, stainless steel), Skôde, Sweden.
- Sculpture (1971, stainless steel), CES of Morez, Jura.
- Fountain (1971, stainless steel), Normal school of Conflans-Sainte-Honorine, Yvelines.
- Sculpture (1972, stainless steel), Fondation Port-Barcarès, Aude.
- Relief (1972, stainless steel), Railway Station of RER, Saint-Germain-en-Laye, Yvelines.
- Sign (1973, stainless steel) for the sun door, plateau d'Assy, High Savoye.
- Sculpture (1974, stainless steel), primary school Wilson-Mulhouse, Reims, Marne.
- Sculpture (1975, stainless steel), CET Jean Moulin, Le Chesnay, Yvelines.
- Sculpture (1976, stainless steel), CES of Garges-Ies-Gonnesses, Val d'Oise.
- Sculpture (1977, stainless steel), seed of the SACEM, Neuilly-sur-Seine.
- Sign (1978, stainless steel), Modern Art Museum of Dunkerque, Nord.
- Sign (1979, stainless steel), Fécamp high school.
- Sculpture (1979), Musée de la Sculpture en Plein Air, Paris.
- Sign (1981, stainless steel), Bastia high school.
- Sign (1981, stainless steel), LEP of Draguignan.
- Sculpture (1983, stainless steel), library of Chatillon-sous-Bagneux, Market Square.
- Sculpture and relief (1983, stainless steel), House of the Culture, Domazan, Gard.
- Sculpture and relief (1983, stainless steel), Boissy-sous-Saint-Yon, Essonne.
- Monument to the General Koenig, Marshal of France (1984, stainless steel) porte Maillot, Paris, in collaboration with Marc Landowski. Prize Bartholdi-Eiffel.
- Monumental Sculpture named Andorra (1985, stainless steel), Camí de Prada Casadet, Andorra la Vella, Principality of Andorra.
- Sculpture (1986, stainless steel), shopping center, Washington, U.S.A., sign 10 meters high.
- Sign (1986, stainless steel), Galaxy, diameter 10 m, Geneva motorway, service area Bourg-Teyssonge, Bourg-en-Bresse.
- Monument to Victor Hugo (1986, stainless steel), Prefecture gardens, Créteil, Val-de-Marne.
- Sculpture (1990, stainless steel), carrefour de l'Espace, Cannes la Bocca.
- Sign (1990, stainless steel), Le Touquet.
- Monumental Sculpture (1991, stainless steel), Fontenay-sous-Bois.
- Sculpture (1994, stainless steel), Paul Robert high school, Les Lilas, Paris.
- Fountain Sculpture (1995, stainless steel), Montimeran Hospital, Béziers.
- Sculpture (stainless steel, without a name) in the middle age village of Etroubles, Saint-Rhémy-En-Bosses, Italy.
