= Collège Gérald-Godin =

Public college in Montréal, Quebec

Coordinates: 45.483146°N 73.86773°W

Cégep Gérald-Godin
- Type: college
- Established: 1999
- Director General: Christian Roy
- Students: 1200
- Undergraduates: pre-university, technical, and continuing education students
- Location: 15615, boulevard Gouin Ouest; Sainte-Geneviève, Quebec, Sainte-Geneviève, Quebec, Canada
- Campus: Suburban
- Website: cgodin.qc.ca

Cégep Gérald-Godin is a French-language public college located in Sainte-Geneviève, Montreal, Quebec, Canada. It is the first and only French-language public college on the West Island of Montreal.

It is located on Gouin Boulevard overlooking the Rivière des Prairies. Its building, designed in 1932 by Lucien Parent, was formerly a novitiate of the Congregation of Holy Cross.

It is named after poet and separatist politician Gérald Godin.

== Programs ==
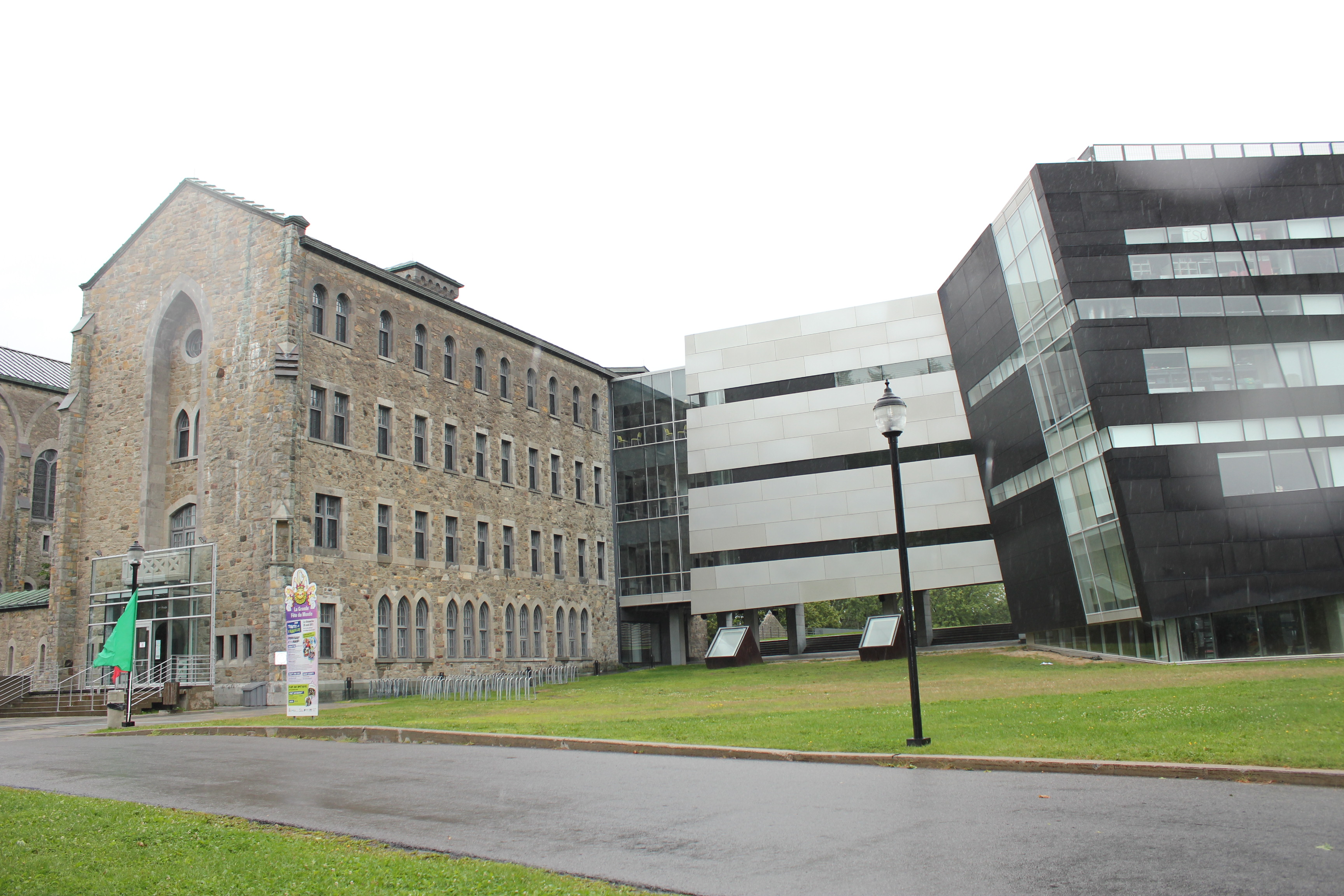

Pre-university programs

- Creative Arts
- Science
- Social Sciences

Career programs

- Business Administration
- Computer Science
- Computerized systems
- Pharmaceutical production
