= King Gordogan =

1943 play by Radovan Ivšić

King Gordogan (Croatian: Kralj Gordogan) is a surrealist play written by the Croatian poet Radovan Ivšić in 1943. This bleak fairy tale is about a man who usurps a throne to become king, and then jails the daughter of his murdered predecessor while planning to kill her. The new king's son falls in love with the jailed woman, while various people resist or assist the king's various oppressive actions.

This play was written in the shadow of World War II, and featured a king who was a bloodthirsty tyrant. This work was suppressed by the Nazi occupiers of Croatia, and continued to be suppressed by the communist government of Yugoslavia led by Josip Broz Tito.
