= Saint Joseph's Oratory =

Catholic shrine and minor basilica in Montreal

Saint Joseph's Oratory of Mount Royal
- French: Oratoire Saint-Joseph-du-Mont-Royal
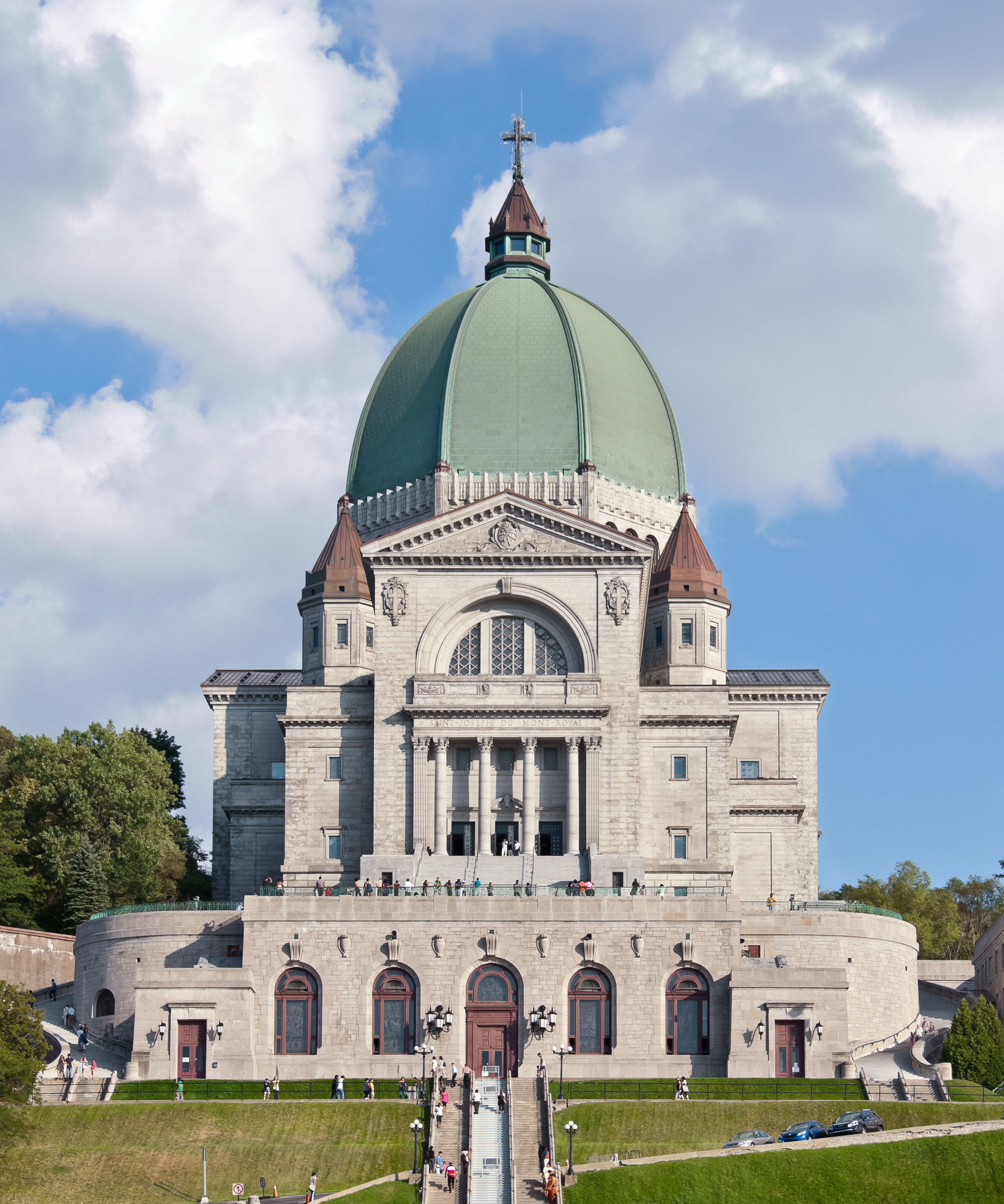
- The building in 2011

- Location within Montreal

Religion
- Affiliation: Catholic Church
- Diocese: Archdiocese of Montreal
- Ecclesiastical or organisational status: Minor basilica
- Leadership: Rector of Saint Joseph’s Oratory (26 November 2024): Father Bernard Antoine, C.S.C.

Location
- Location: 3800, chemin Queen Mary; Montreal, Quebec, Canada
- Coordinates: 45°29′30″N 73°37′00″W

Architecture
- Architects: Dalbé Viau, Alphonse Venne, Lucien Parent and Dom Paul Bellot
- Type: Oratory, domed basilica
- Style: Italian renaissance
- Completed: 1967

Specifications
- Direction of façade: NNW
- Capacity: 10,000 / 2,400 sitting
- Length: 105 metres (344 ft)
- Width: 65 metres (213 ft)
- Width (nave): 37 metres (121 ft)
- Height (max): 102 metres (335 ft)
- Dome: 1 (double shell design)
- Dome height (outer): 97 metres (318 ft) (from nave floor)
- Dome height (inner): 60 metres (200 ft) (from nave floor)
- Dome dia. (outer): 39 metres (128 ft)
- Dome dia. (inner): 26 metres (85 ft)
- Materials: Canadian granite, copper
- National Historic Site of Canada
- Official name: Saint Joseph’s Oratory of Mount Royal National Historic Site of Canada
- Designated: 2004

Website
- www.saint-joseph.org/en

Saint Joseph's Oratory of Mount Royal (French: Oratoire Saint-Joseph-du-Mont-Royal) is a Roman Catholic minor basilica and national shrine located at 3800 Queen Mary Road in the Côte-des-Neiges neighborhood on Mount Royal's Westmount Summit in Montreal, Quebec. It is a National Historic Site of Canada and is Canada's largest church, with one of the largest church domes in the world. Founded in 1904 by Saint André Bessette in honour of his patron saint, Saint Joseph, the Oratory is the product of numerous architects and thousands of workers in a process spanning six decades. With its monumental scale, Renaissance Revival facade and contrasting Art Deco interior, the Oratory is recognizable not just in Montreal but around the world, attracting more than 2 million visitors and pilgrims to its steps each year.

The Oratory is the highest building in Montreal, rising more than 30 metres above Mount Royal's summit, allowing it to be seen from many kilometres away. It is the only building that violates the height restriction under the municipal building code of Montreal, which limits the height of any building, including skyscrapers, from surpassing the height of Mount Royal.

Since 2018, the dome and lantern atop the Oratory have undergone a series of renovations expected to be completed in 2024 by architecture firms Atelier TAG and Architecture49. The C$80 million project will create safe access to the lantern which will allow for an unprecedented 360-degree view over the mountain of the city.

== History ==
=== Early history ===
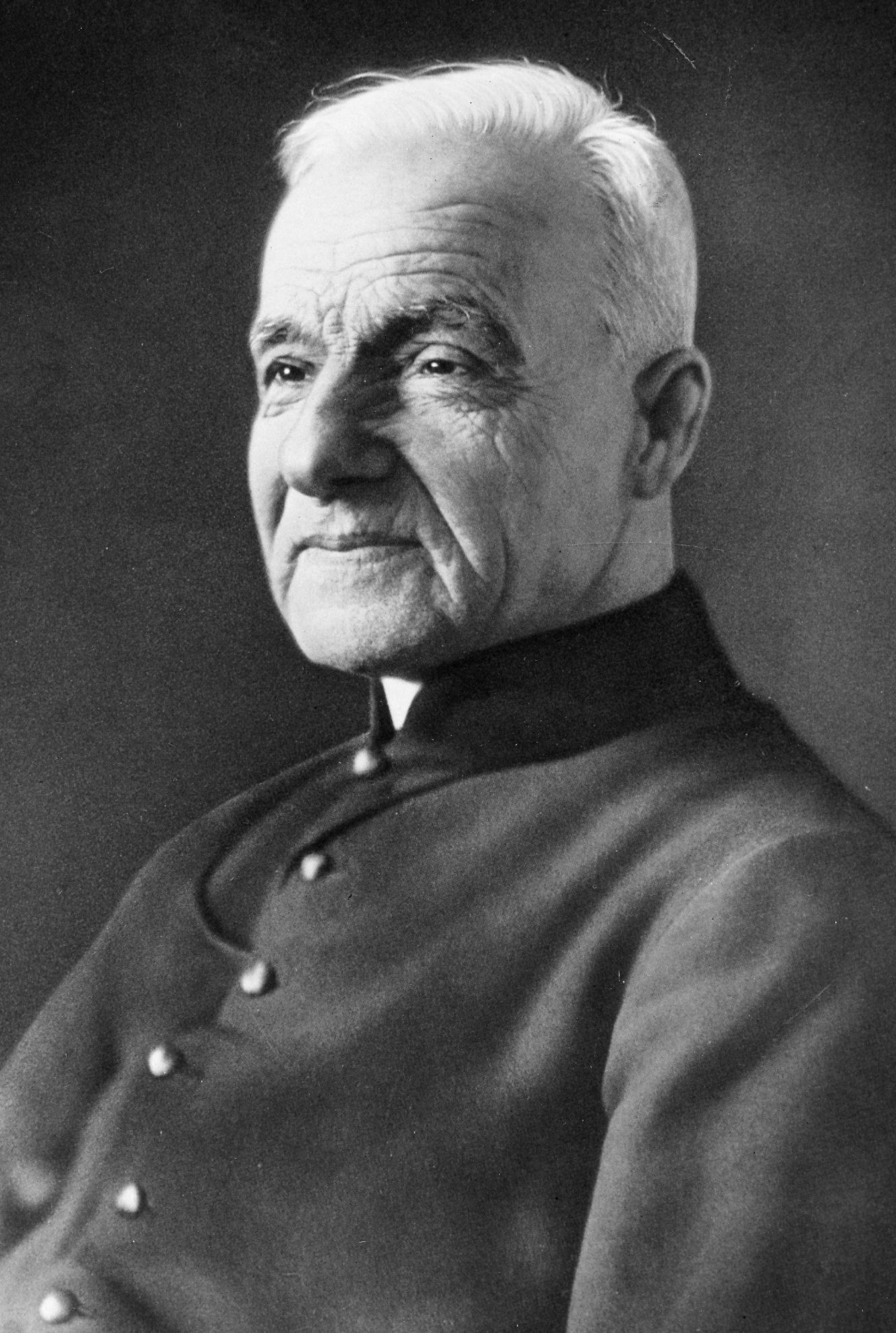
André Bessette, C.S.C., commonly known as Brother André.

Saint André Bessette, C.S.C. (1845–1937), more commonly known as Brother André, was a religious brother and a member of the Congregation of Holy Cross who became internationally renowned as a miracle healer. Due to his reputation, in 1904 he was given funding to construct a small chapel on Mount-Royal across from Notre Dame College to operate out of. The small, Gothic Revival style chapel expanded four times over the next decade with the growing of Brother André's fame and the Congregation decided to fulfill his request to build a basilica in his patron saint, Saint Joseph's honor. The original chapel, measuring 4.5 meters by 5.5 meters still stands today, though it has since been relocated about a hundred meters away to make room for the massive basilica that stands today.

The first phase of the basilica’s construction involved architects Dalbé Viau (1881–1938) and Alphonse Venne (1875–1934) who had previously done work for the Congregation. From 1914 to 1916, Viau and Venne constructed the crypt church, with seating for 1,000, which still stands today and forms the base of the basilica where the massive collection of stairs ends. Between 1924 and 1927, the crypt and building up until the roof were completed in the Renaissance Revival style. Viau and Venne had wanted the dome of the Oratory to resemble that of St. Peter’s Basilica in Rome, and to be smaller than it actually is today; however, they never had the chance to see those plans through as construction was halted with the Great Depression.

=== After the Great Depression ===
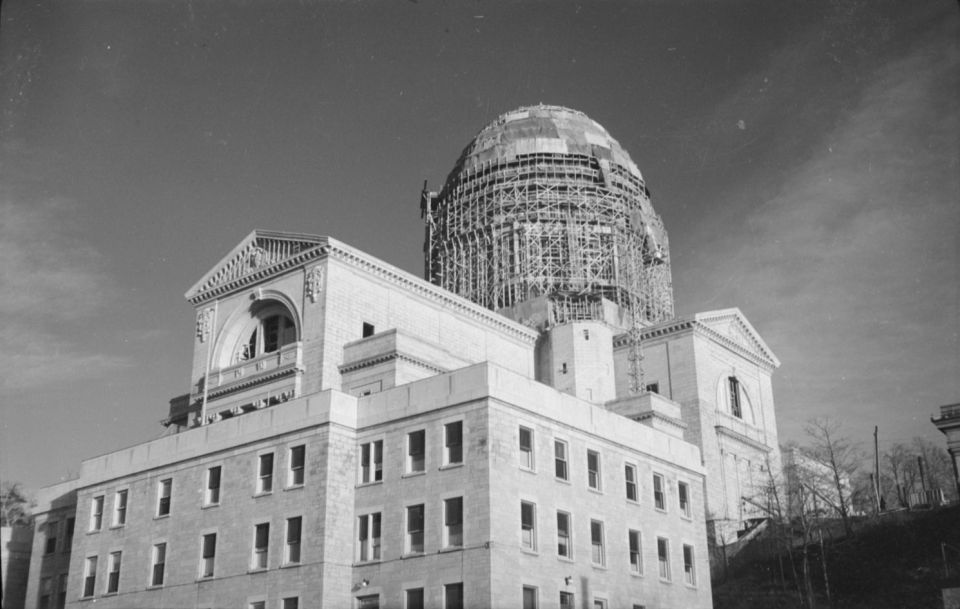
Construction of the dome in 1937.

In 1937, Dom Paul Bellot (1876–1944), born in France, was hired to work after the death of Venne; however, he was required to work through Canadian Lucien Parent (1893–1956) due to not being a registered architect in Quebec. He redesigned Viau and Venne's roof and dome entirely, making the dome significantly larger and modelling it to resemble the dome of Florence Cathedral. The construction of his large Oratory dome lasted four years and was completed in 1941 after involving thousands of workers.

From 1949 to 1951, architect Gilbert Moreau carried out alterations and improvements to the interior of Saint Joseph's Oratory, as well as to the adjacent monastery, and rearranged the sacristy in the basilica.

Composer Émilien Allard was the church's carillonneur from 1955 to 1975. For RCA Victor he released the LP album Carols at the Carillon of Saint Joseph's Oratory for which he wrote the arrangements.

In 1938 and 1939 the Oratory's corporation bought two neighbouring villas on chemin Queen-Mary, among them Terra Nova, built in 1848 for John Molson Jr. to designs by George Browne and later the home of the Bank of Montreal president Sir Charles Gordon; since 1955 it has housed the choir school of the Petits Chanteurs du Mont-Royal.

=== 21st century ===
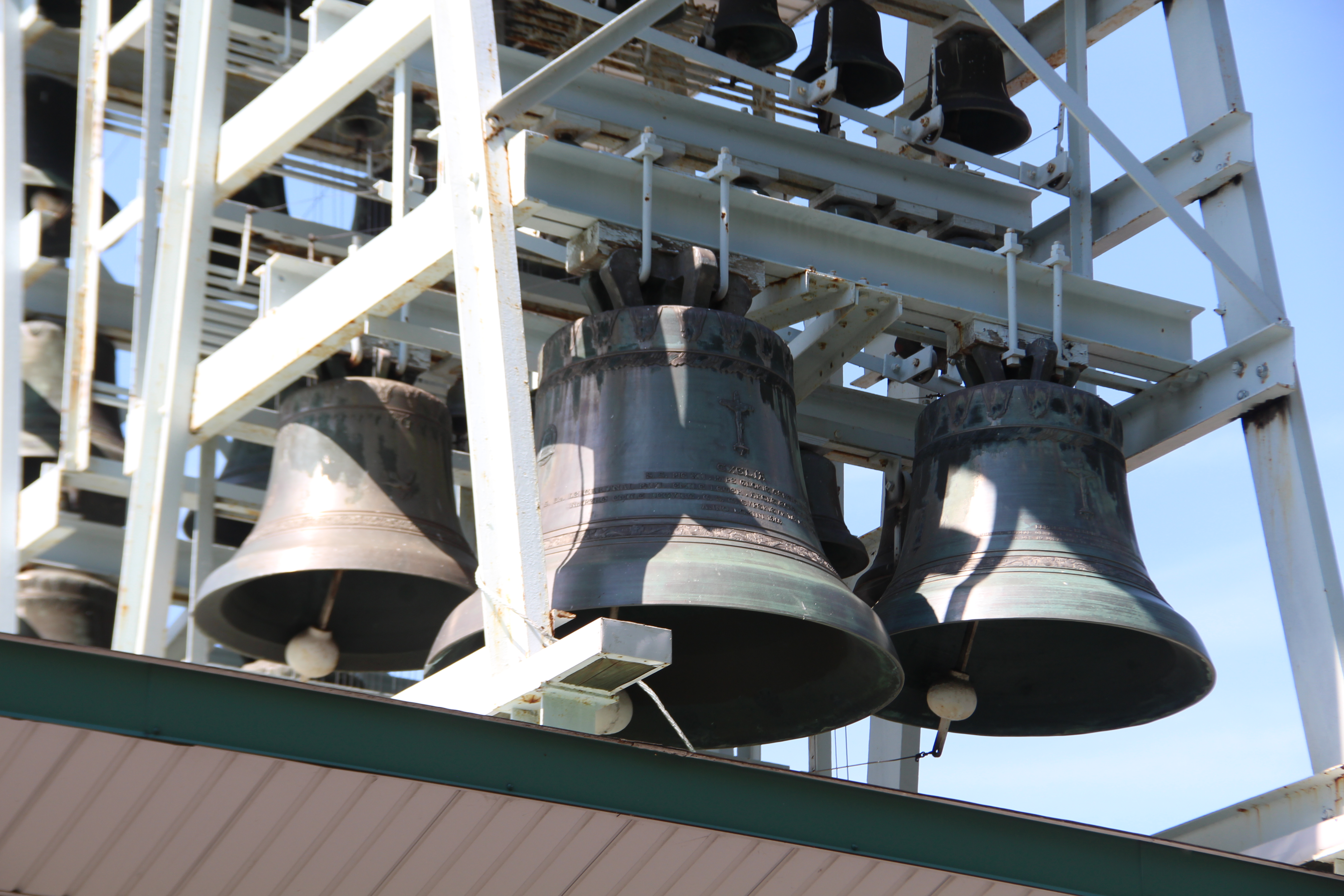
The Oratory's bells were rung in October 2004, to commemorate the centennial of the building's construction.

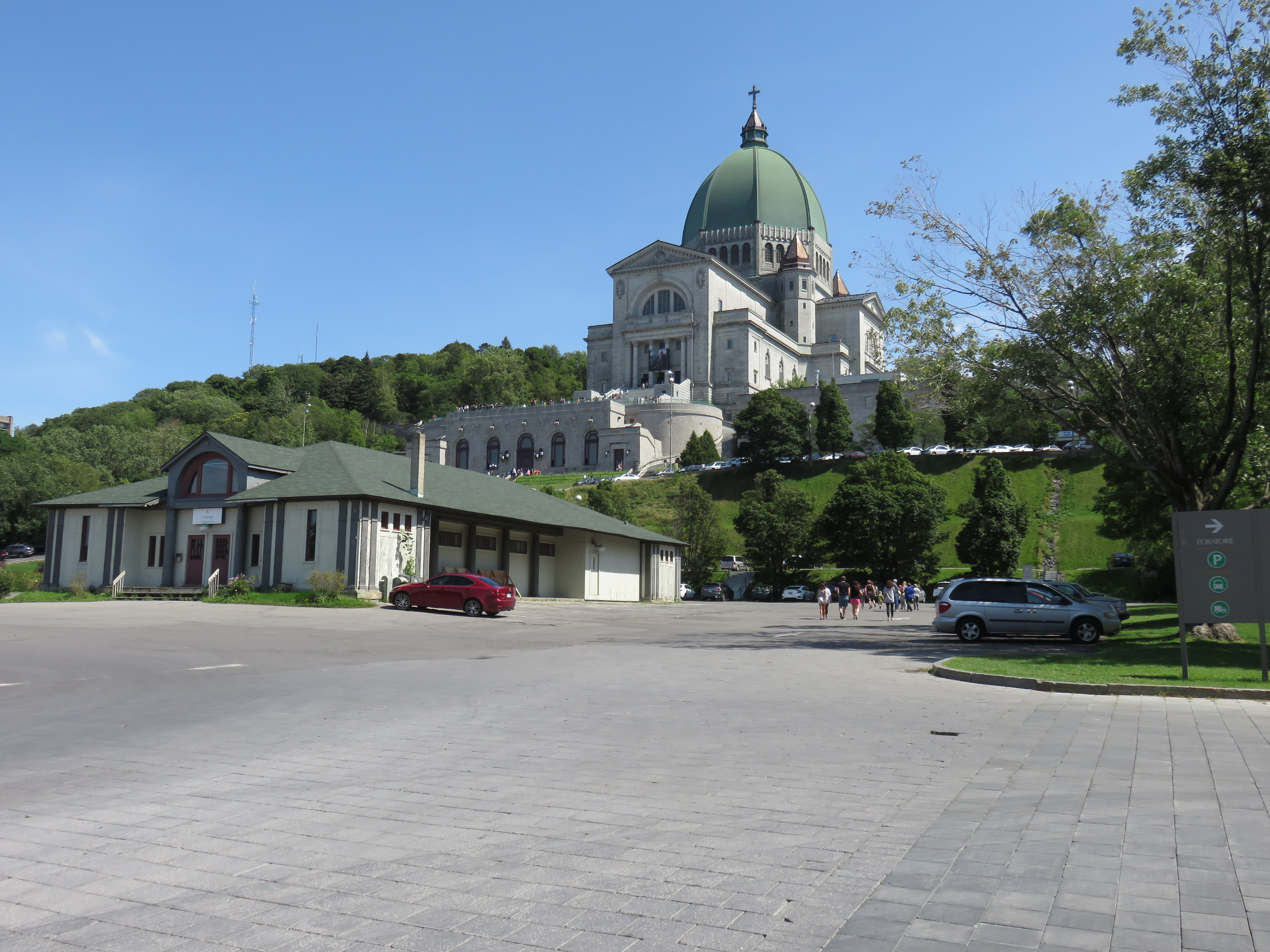
Exterior in 2017

On 19 October 2004, the Oratory held its centennial. All the bells of all the churches on the island of Montreal were supposed to ring at 9:00 a.m., though not all churches participated. At 9:05 a.m., the basilica rang its bell in response and celebration.

On April 2, again to commemorate the Oratory's centennial, Canada Post issued "Saint Joseph's Oratory, Quebec" in the 2004 Tourist Attractions series. The stamp was designed by Catharine Bradbury & William Stewart based on a photograph by Bernard Brault. The 49¢ stamps are perforated kiss cut and were printed by Lowe-Martin Company Inc. That same year, the Oratory was designated a National Historic Site of Canada.

In 2018, the architectural firms Atelier TAG and Architecture49 won a competition organized by Saint Joseph's Oratory to renovate the inside of its dome and its observatory. The project is estimated to cost around $80 million CAD and will also include a complete renovation of the building's museum and the construction of a new welcome centre on Queen Mary road. The lantern will have space for up to 17 visitors at a time and will offer the only 360-degree view over the mountain in the city. As of early 2024, renovations are underway.

==== Incidents ====
On 30 October 2007, Father Charles Corso, a priest at the Oratory, was faced with a disorganized and depressed man who threatened to kill himself with a handgun. The priest talked with the man and managed to calm him down before police arrived on scene. The man was brought to hospital to undergo psychiatric evaluation.

On 22 March 2019, a 26-year-old man wearing a dark winter coat and light-coloured baseball cap entered the Oratory during the Friday morning mass, rapidly walked up to the centre, and stabbed the celebrating priest, Father Claude Grou. Of the fifty people attending mass, several intervened to neutralize the assailant, before security guards responded. Police officers from the Service de police de la Ville de Montréal quickly arrived on scene and arrested the assailant who was already detained by security personnel. The assaulted priest suffered only minor injuries, a single stab wound to the chest. That same evening, upon being wheeled out of the Montreal General Hospital, he said, "My health is fine. I’ll take a little rest and I will be back to work when my rest is taken. And the Oratory will remain a place where people can be welcomed. A place of prayers, and a place of calm, and a place of peace – even if there are some moments like that."

== Pontifical coronation ==
Pope Pius X decreed to Pontifically crown a statue of Saint Joseph on 19 March 1910 via Cardinal Vincenzo Vannutelli. This statue is now enshrined within the oil chapel and was previously located at the Côte-des-Neiges Chapel. The same image was ceremonially crowned for the second time on 9 August 1955 by Pope Pius XII via Cardinal Paul-Émile Léger.

== Architecture and structure ==
When the basilica's construction began in 1914, many architects were challenging the conventional Beaux-Arts style and neoclassicism. This period was also around the time where expressionist architecture, constructivist architecture, Bauhaus ideas and many other facets of modern architecture began to take off, with pioneers like Le Corbusier in Europe and Frank Lloyd Wright in the United States refusing to be categorized by traditional architectural styles. It was certainly atypical for monumental classical church buildings to be constructed in cities around this time, yet Saint Joseph's Oratory was one of the largest buildings in Montreal when it was constructed, and was designed in Renaissance Revival exterior with an Art Deco interior. The basilica, as it stands today, comprises many parts, including the Crypt Church, located underneath the basilica, the Votive Chapel, between the Crypt and the rock of Mount-Royal, the Shrine, which encompasses the nave, apse and transept, and the dome, which is the largest church dome in Canada and the third largest in the world.

During the summer solstice, the setting sun is perfectly aligned with the center line of the main steps that lead up to (and into) the basilica. Every year around that time, people sit on the steps to watch the sunset. The main aisle inside the basilica, and even the cross on the altar, are also in perfect alignment with the setting sun on the longest day of the year. Sunlight enters the basilica through some windows and doors.

On the day of the total solar eclipse, Monday 8 April 2024, the steps and surrounding areas were filled to capacity with people there to experience the eclipse. Totality occurred at 3:26 pm for about 85 seconds. The temperature was about 15 °C (59 °F). Although the eastern part of the sky was clear, the southwestern part, where the sun was, had cirrus clouds that muted some of the effects of the eclipse. However, the diamond ring effects, corona with prominences, and planets Venus and Jupiter were all visible to the unaided eye. The spectators cheered and applauded as totality started. After totality some people sang "You Are My Sunshine". A sun rainbow halo formed in the cirrus clouds, and a jet flying across the halo left a contrail with a contrail shadow. Most of the snow from the snowstorm five days earlier had melted.

=== Crypt Church ===
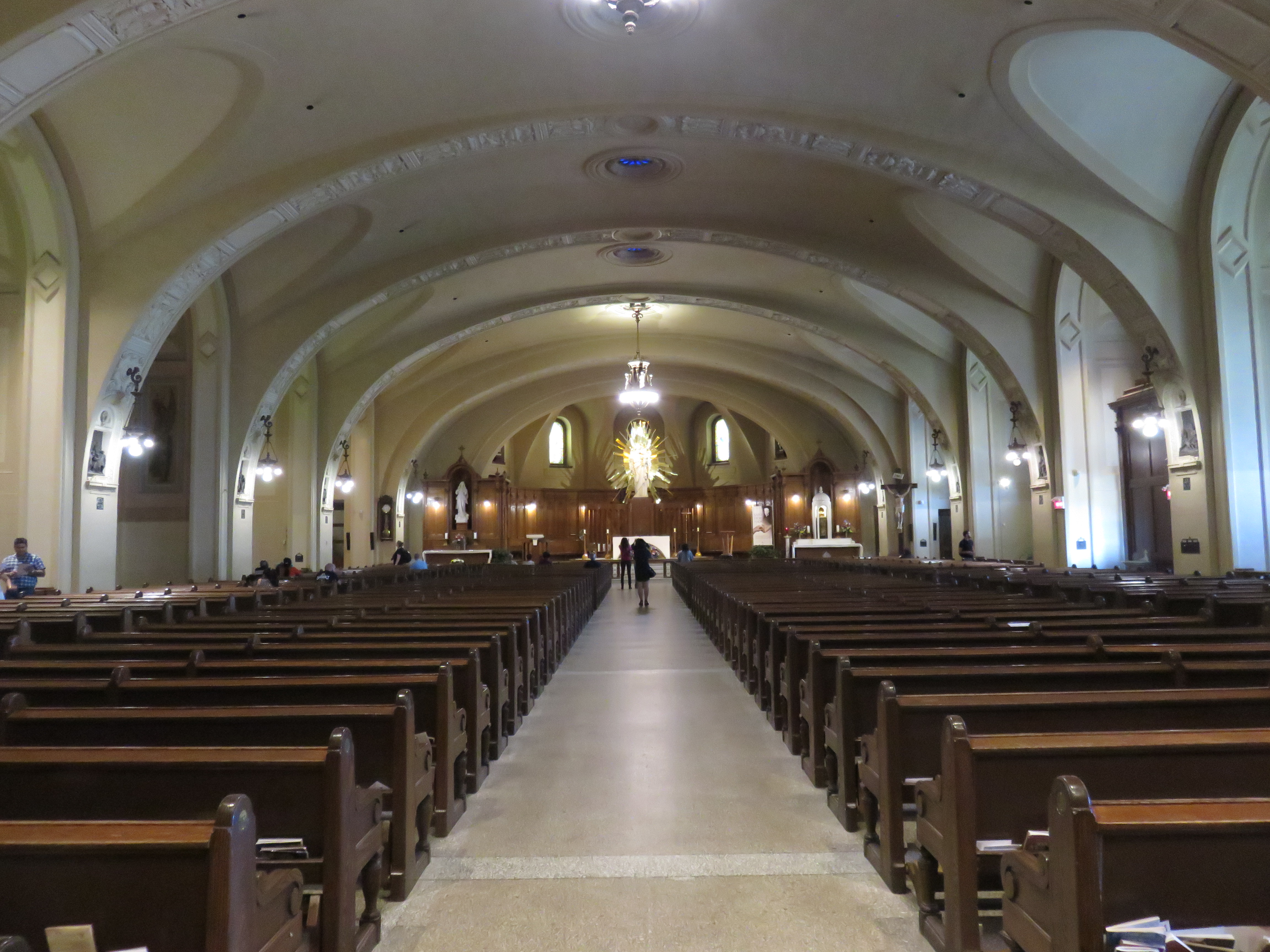
Interior of the crypt church in 2017, showing the barrel vaulting of its ceiling

The Crypt Church, originally designed by Viau and Venne, measures 63.39 by 36.5 by 13.1 m (208.0 by 119.8 by 43.0 ft), has a seating capacity of 1000 people and is designed in a neoclassical style. The ceiling is supported using the barrel vaulting of steel-reinforced concrete arches. The church is called a "crypt" due to its flattened arches as well as its position embedded into the mountain underneath the basilica. There is a statue of Joseph made out of Carrara marble behind the main altar of the Crypt Church, added in 1917 by the Italian artist A. Giacomini. Eight stained glass windows depicting the stages in Saint Joseph's life were installed in the crypt in 1919 by the Montreal firm Perdriau et O'Shea.

=== Votive Chapel ===
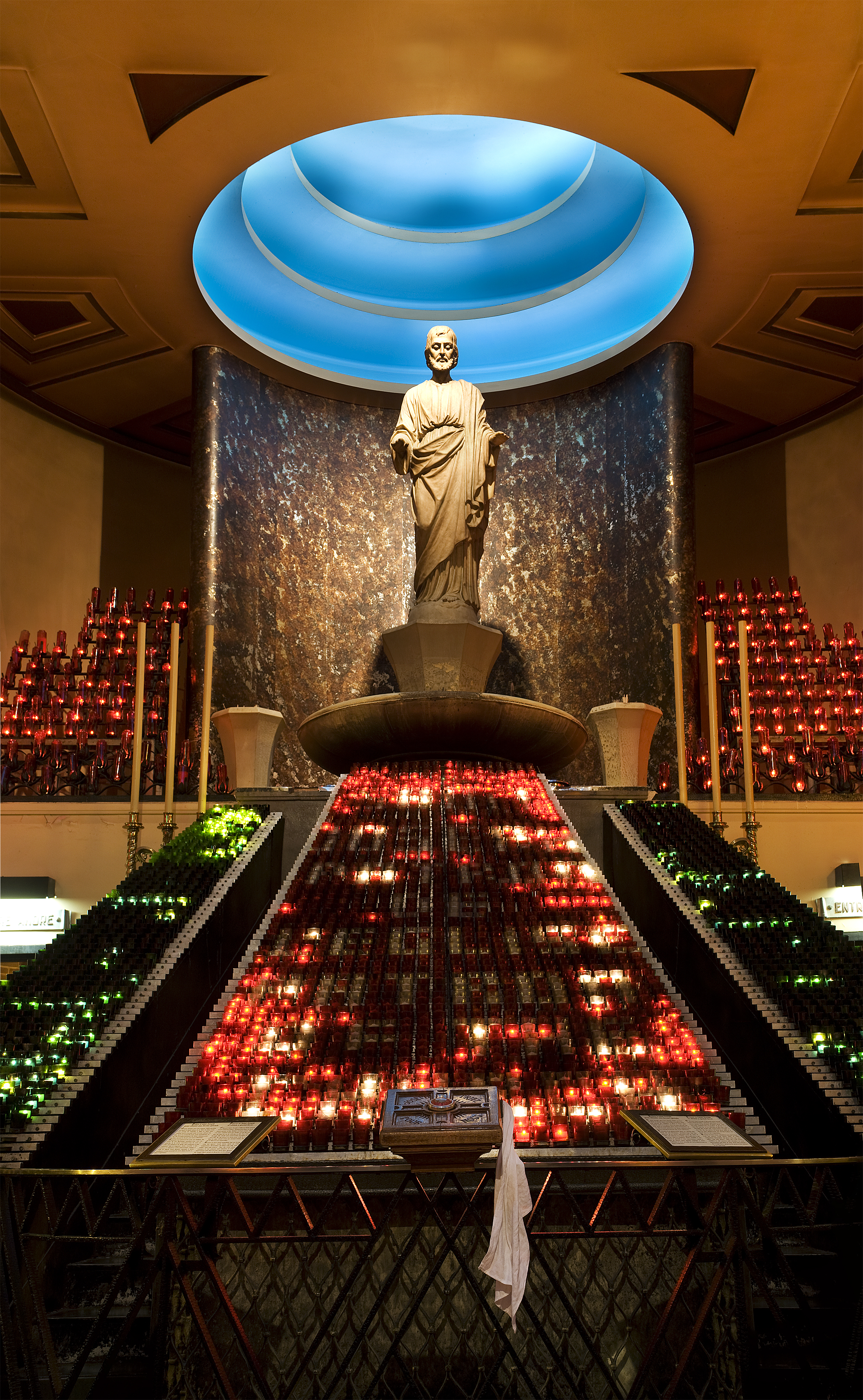
The statue of Saint Joseph in the Votive Chapel in 2007, surrounded by candles

Added between 1946 and 1949 between the Crypt Church and the rock of Mount Royal, the Votive Chapel is designed in Art Deco style from the plans of Lucien Parent, and relies on heavy use of geometric forms (square columns, square paneling on ceiling). The Chapel measures 31.69 by 15.2 by 27.43 m (104.0 by 49.9 by 90.0 ft) and contains approximately 10,000 candles, with the central lampstand in front of the statue of Saint Joseph holding approximately 3500 votive candles. The chapel, also referred to as "the Chapel of Ex-votos," has nearly 1000 ex-votos (canes, crutches, etc.) suspended within it, left behind by pilgrims during the life of Brother André. The chapel also contains eight bas-reliefs designed by Canadian sculptor, Joseph Guardo in 1948, which illustrate eight of the attributes which Christianity has accorded to Saint Joseph. The tomb of Saint André, sculpted in black marble, rests in an alcove in the middle of the Votive Chapel.

=== Shrine ===
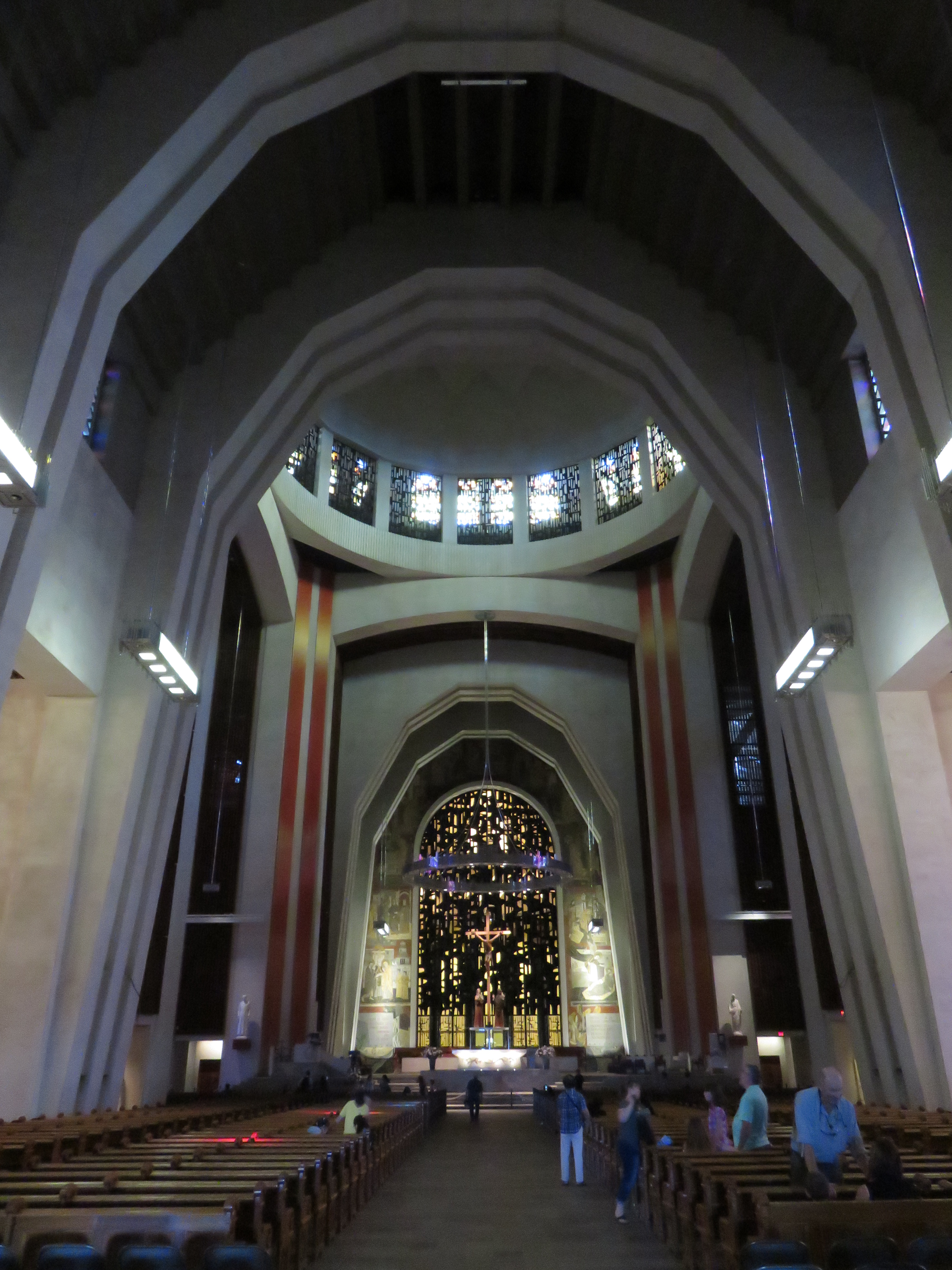
The interior of the basilica in 2017, with its bright colours, stained glass and iconic multi-angled arches

The interior of the basilica, known as the Shrine, was designed using concepts by Dom Bellot as well as Canadian architect Gérard Notebaert, and uses a Latin cross layout with a dome at the crossing. The interior has an overall length of 105 m (344 ft). The nave, which contains pews to seat 2,028 people (with a maximum capacity of 10,000 people), measures 37 m (121 ft) in width, while the transept measures 65 metres (213 ft) and connects to the shrine of Brother André. The apse, as well as the rest of the interior, is designed in Art Deco style, which was very popular in Montreal during the 1930s, and contains sculptures, bas-reliefs, mosaics and stained glass of religious imagery. The roof of the basilica is held up using reinforced concrete multi-angle arches iconic of Dom Bellot’s style.

The exterior of the Oratory is constructed using large blocks of granite from Lac Mégantic quarries in Quebec. The colonnade at the front façade of the building consists of four 18 m (59 ft)-tall, 1.5 m (4 ft 11 in)-thick Corinthian columns which provide the structural support for the entablature of the front portico. It is also corniced and ornamented. The staircase which leads from the street to the base of the basilica contain two parallel flights of 283 concrete steps separated by a central flight of 99 wooden steps reserved for pilgrims who wish to climb on their knees.

=== Dome ===
The dome, as seen from the interior of the basilica

The dome of Saint Joseph’s Oratory is the largest church dome in Canada and among the largest and the tallest domes in the world, and this is a result of Dom Bellot’s very inspired and ambitious designs. His plans for the dome are very similar to those of Florence Cathedral, being of a "double shell" design, meaning it consists of two domes, one on the interior and one on the exterior with empty space in between. Like the cathedral in Florence, the outer dome of the Oratory consists of eight pointed arches laying atop an octagonal drum, with a lantern and cross. The outer dome of the Oratory measures only 17.78 cm (7.00 in) in thickness and the inner dome measures only about 12.7 cm (5.0 in) in thickness, which is approximately 18 times thinner than the dome of St. Peter's Basilica in Rome. The concrete shell of the Oratory's dome is so thin in fact that when related to its overall size, it is akin to an eggshell.

The two domes vary immensely in span and height, with the outer dome measuring 39 m (128 ft) in diameter and rising 97 m (318 ft) from the nave floor, and the inner dome measuring 26 m (85 ft) in diameter and rising 60 m (200 ft) from the nave floor. There are 16 steel buttresses along the inner walls of the drums that provide the structural support for the dome. They serve to brace the inner dome against the outer dome, thus making the supporting walls for both domes more rigid.

Steps

The steps are a popular viewpoint for sunset in Montréal because of their orientation, the views of the skyline of Montreal towards the northwestern direction, and the wide steps offering ample seating. It is common that viewers, both locals and tourists, will clap as the sun reaches the horizon.

== In popular culture ==
The 1989 film Jesus of Montreal uses the Oratory as its principal backdrop. A photograph of the Oratory is used for the picture representing Montreal in the Monopoly: Here and Now: The World Edition game. Some scenes from the first season of the series Heated Rivalry were filmed at the Oratory.

== See also ==
- List of basilicas in Canada
- List of carillons in Canada
- List of tallest domes
