= Lucien Parent =

Canadian architect (1893–1956)

- Born: Pierre Ovide Lucien Parent; April 29, 1893; Montreal, Quebec, Canada
- Died: May 27, 1956 (aged 63); Montreal, Quebec, Canada
- Occupations: Architect, artist
- Spouse: Florence Courteau
- Children: Mimi Parent

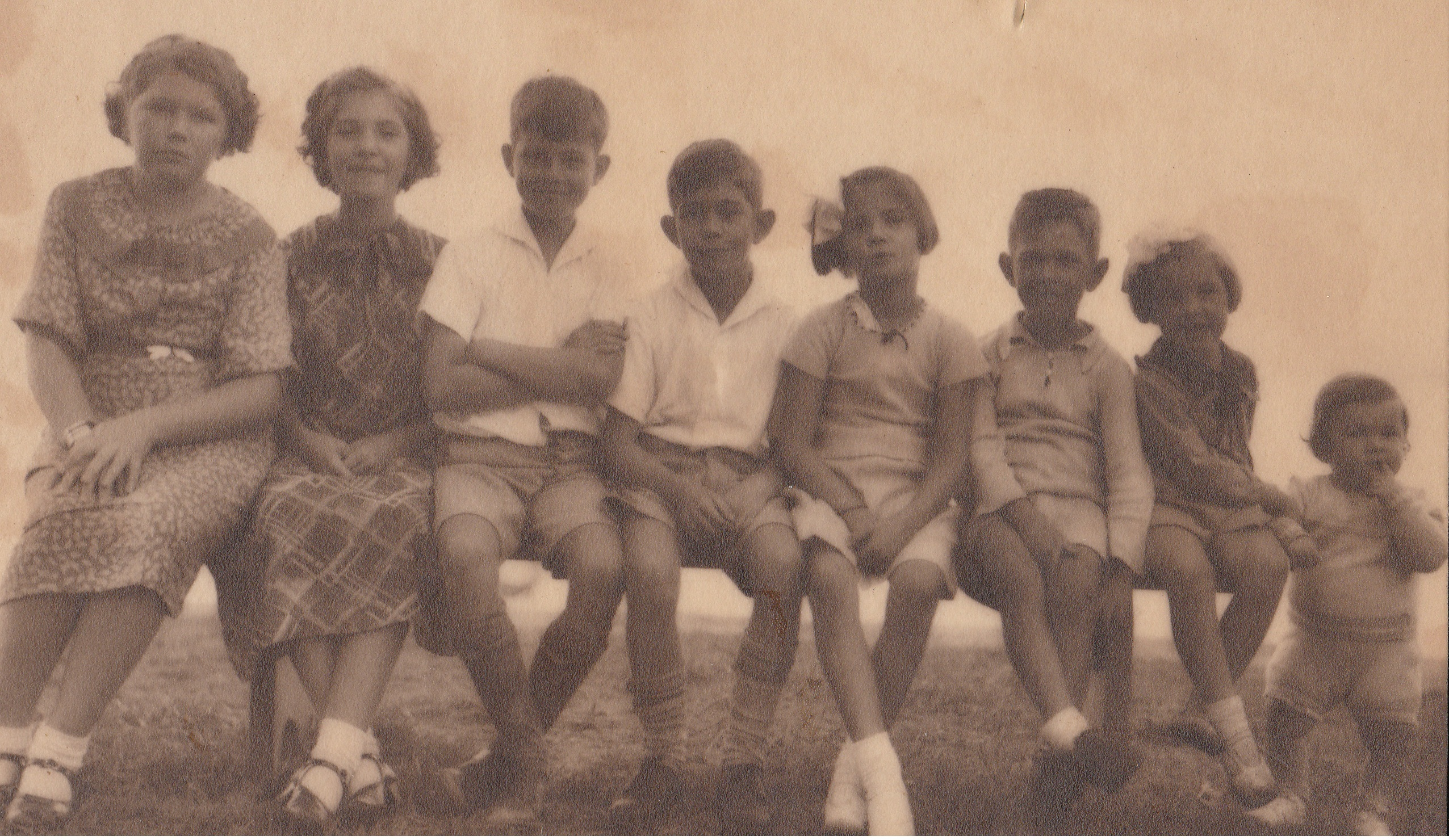
Lucien Parent's children

Lucien Parent (born Pierre Ovide Lucien Parent; April 29, 1893 – May 27, 1956) was a prolific architect, designer, illustrator, and watercolorist. He and his wife Florence Courteau had a family of nine children. He was also a member of the Royal Canadian Academy of Arts.

== Buildings designed ==
- Basilique Saint Joseph's Oratory at Montreal begin 1924 with Dom Paul Bellot and Ernest Cormier
- Maison Arthur Dubuc
- Pine Court Apartments, at Montreal in 1929 with Siméon Brais
- J. Edmond Morins building, at Montreal in 1930 avec Henri S. Labelle
- Church of St. Andrew and St. Paul at Montreal, complete rebuilding, modifications and moving of emplacement in 1931
- Cégep Gérald-Godin, at Montreal in 1932
- Maison Émile Corbeil, at Montreal in 1936
- Saint-Jean-Berchmans Church, at Montreal in 1938 with René-Rodolphe Tourville
- Notre Dame du Très Saint Sacrement church, at Ferme-Neuve in 1939 with René-Rodolphe Tourville
- Notre Dame de Lourde church, at Notre-Dame-de-Pontmain in 1940
- Saint Antoine church, at Saint-Antoine in 1945
- Saint Hugues church, at Lac-Saguay in 1947
- Très Saint Sacrement church, at Lachine in 1950
- Sainte-Adèle church, at the request of its good friend, Claude-Henri Grignon, author of the novel Séraphin: Heart of Stone in (1951).
- Saint Raphael church, at La Malbaie in 1951
- Pharmacie Montréal, at Montreal in 1951
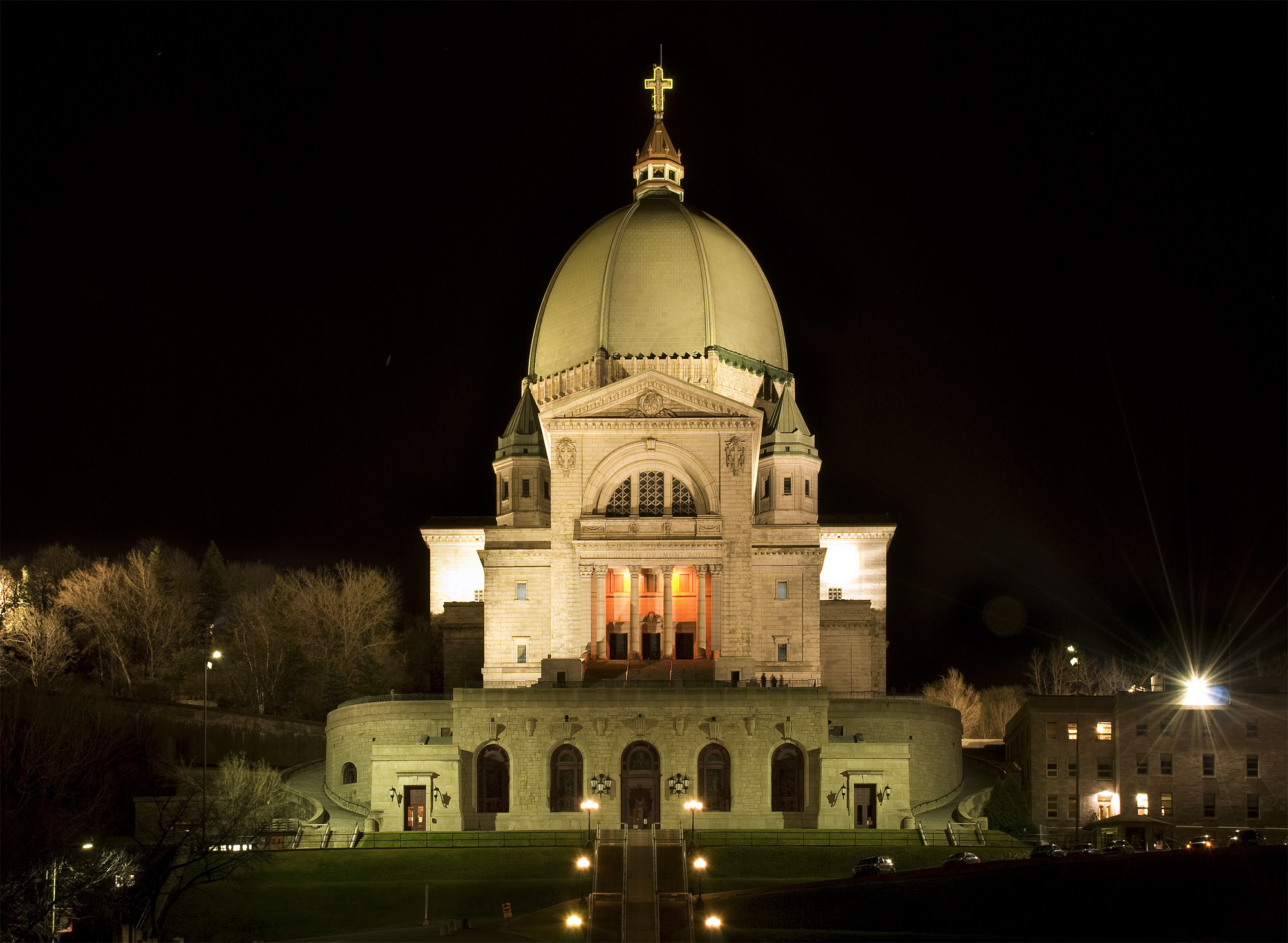
L'Saint Joseph's Oratory in Montreal

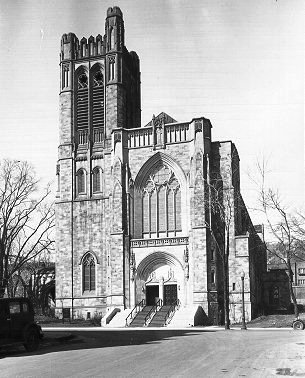
Church of St. Andrew and St. Paul in 1936.

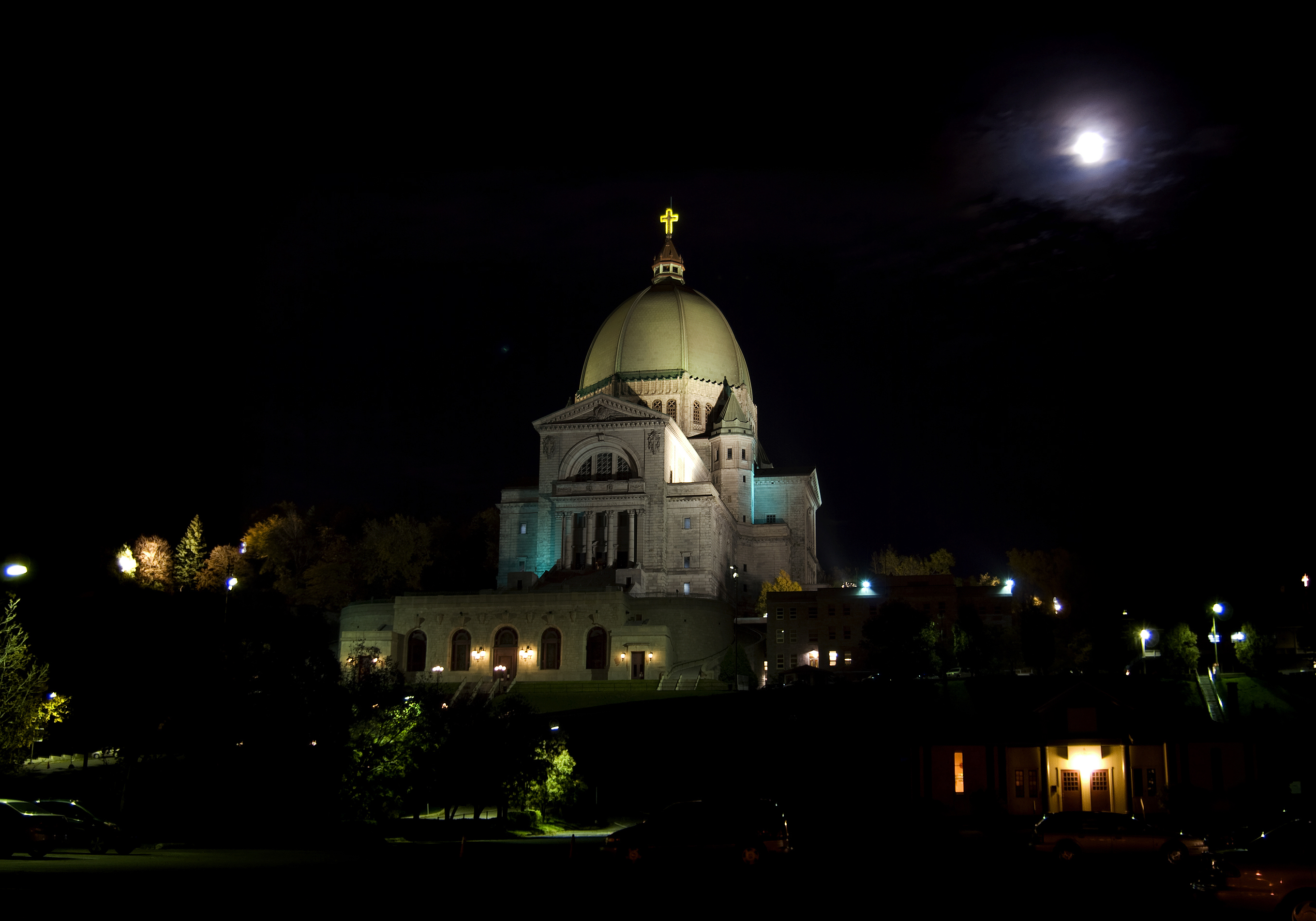
Saint-Joseph Oratory at night
