= Saint-Jean-Berchmans Church =

Coordinates: 45°32′31″N 73°35′28″W

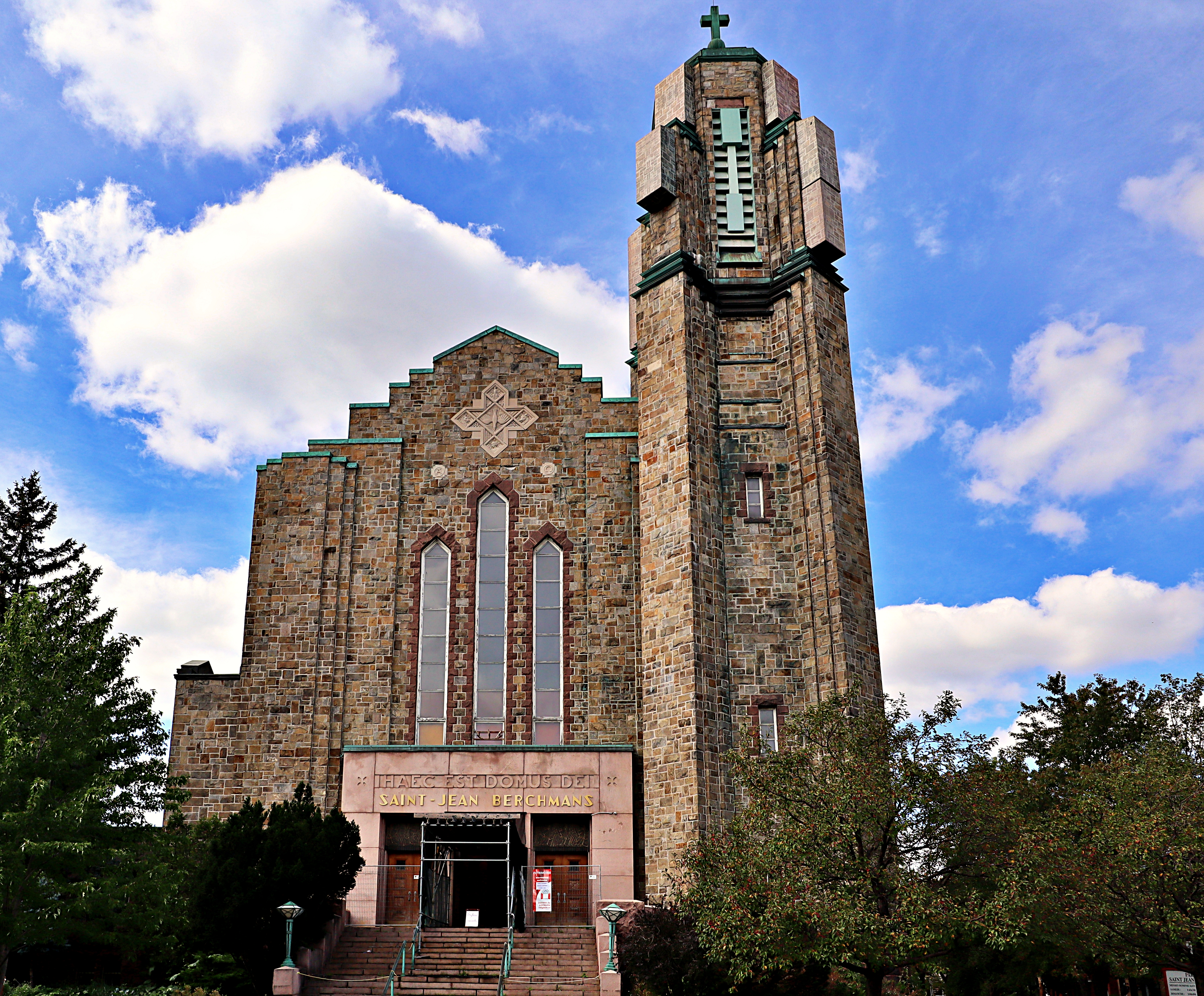
- Saint-Jean-Berchmans Church

- Location within Montreal
- Location: 1871 Rosemont Boulevard Montreal, Quebec
- Country: Canada
- Denomination: Roman Catholic

Architecture
- Functional status: Active
- Architect(s): Lucien Parent and René-Rodolphe Tourville
- Architectural type: Gothic
- Groundbreaking: 1938
- Completed: 1939

Administration
- Province: Province of Montréal
- Archdiocese: Roman Catholic Archdiocese of Montréal
- Parish: Saint-Jean-Berchmans

Saint-Jean-Berchmans Church (French: Église Saint-Jean-Berchmans) is a Roman Catholic church in the Petite-Patrie neighbourhood of the Rosemont–La Petite-Patrie borough in Montreal, Quebec, Canada. It is located on Rosemont Boulevard, east of Papineau Avenue.

== Church ==
Saint-Jean-Berchmans Church was built from 1938 to 1939 based on plans by Lucien Parent and René-Rodolphe Tourville. It is characterized by a Latin cross, a nave with three aisles, and its stone cladding. The church possesses a Casavant Frères organ (opus 1620) dating from its foundation. The church showcases ornamental forged iron by Pancrace Balangero. Balangero was commissioned by the firm Tourville Parent for the work. Balangero was active as an ironsmith in Montreal from 1914 to 1957. His works can be found all over Quebec and Ontario, with examples in Valleyfield, Drummondville, Ottawa and the Montérégie region.

== Saint-Jean Berchmans Parish ==
The parish of St. John Berchmans was formed in 1908 but, because of lack of funds, the church was only completed 30 years later. During this period, religious services were held in a crypt.

== Gallery ==
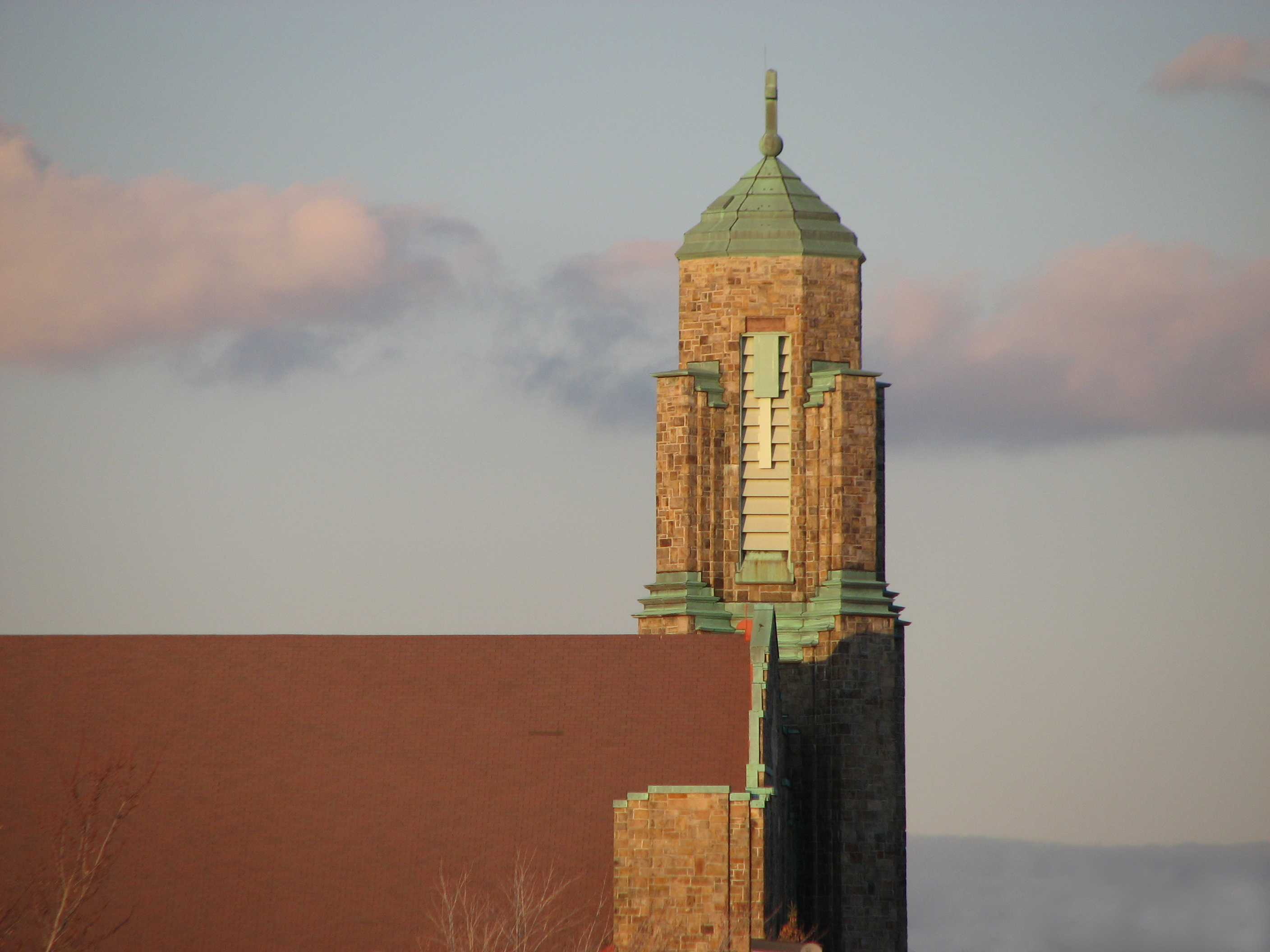
Church bell tower
