= Reinhoud =

20th-century Belgian surrealist sculptor

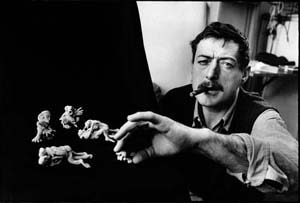
- Reinhoud in 1964
- Born: Reinhoud d'Haese; October 21, 1928; Geraardsbergen, Belgium
- Died: July 1, 2007 (aged 78); Vievy-le-Rayé, France
- Education: Royal Academy of Fine Arts of Brussels
- Known for: Sculpture
- Style: Surrealism
- Movement: Avant-garde
- Awards: nl:Belgian Art Prize; 1957

Reinhoud d'Haese (21 October 1928 - 01 July 2007), known mononymously as Reinhoud, was a Belgian sculptor known for his surrealistic style of sculptures.

== Biography ==
Reinhoud was born in 1928 in Grammont, Belgium and the brother of sculptors Degga and nl:Roel D'Haese. He originally trained to become a goldsmith at the Royal Academy of Fine Arts but pursued sculpting instead. Reinhoud joined the Cobra group in 1949 after being introduced by Pierre Alechinsky. Reinhoud was awarded the Prize for Young Belgian Sculpture in 1957.

In 1959, Reinhoud moved to La Bosse, France, where he died on 24 June 2007.

== Artistry ==
Reinhoud's work has been described as "grotesque" and evocative of Halloween, and in a style to that of Hieronymus Bosch and Brueghel. Reinhoud's sculpture, Against One's Will, once featured at Antwerp's sculpture garden, was described as a "grotesquely grimacing dwarf seemingly formed in contours of saggy drapery". Reinhoud's sculptures were created as one-offs.

== Gallery ==
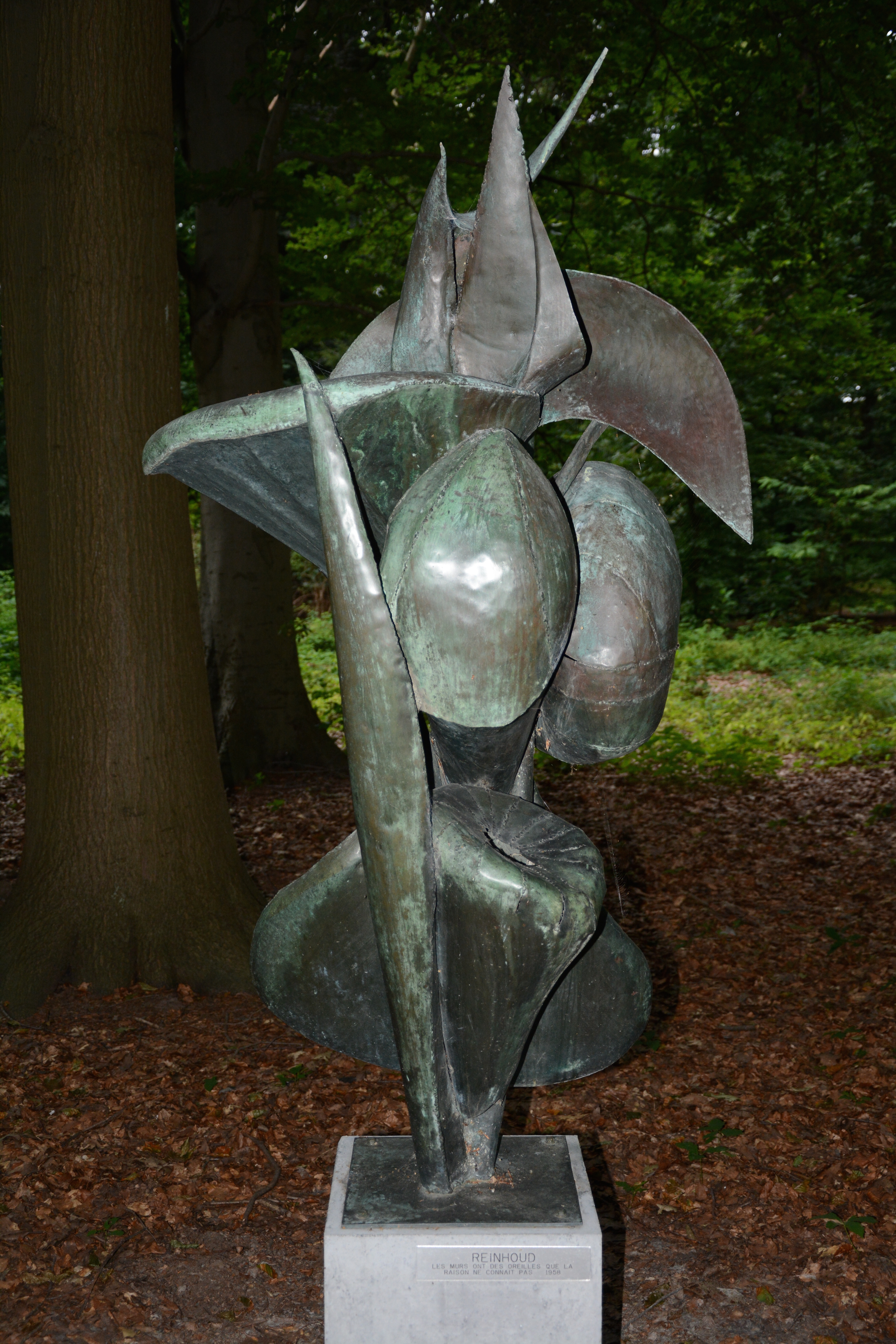
Les murs ont des oreilles que la raison ne connait pas (1958)

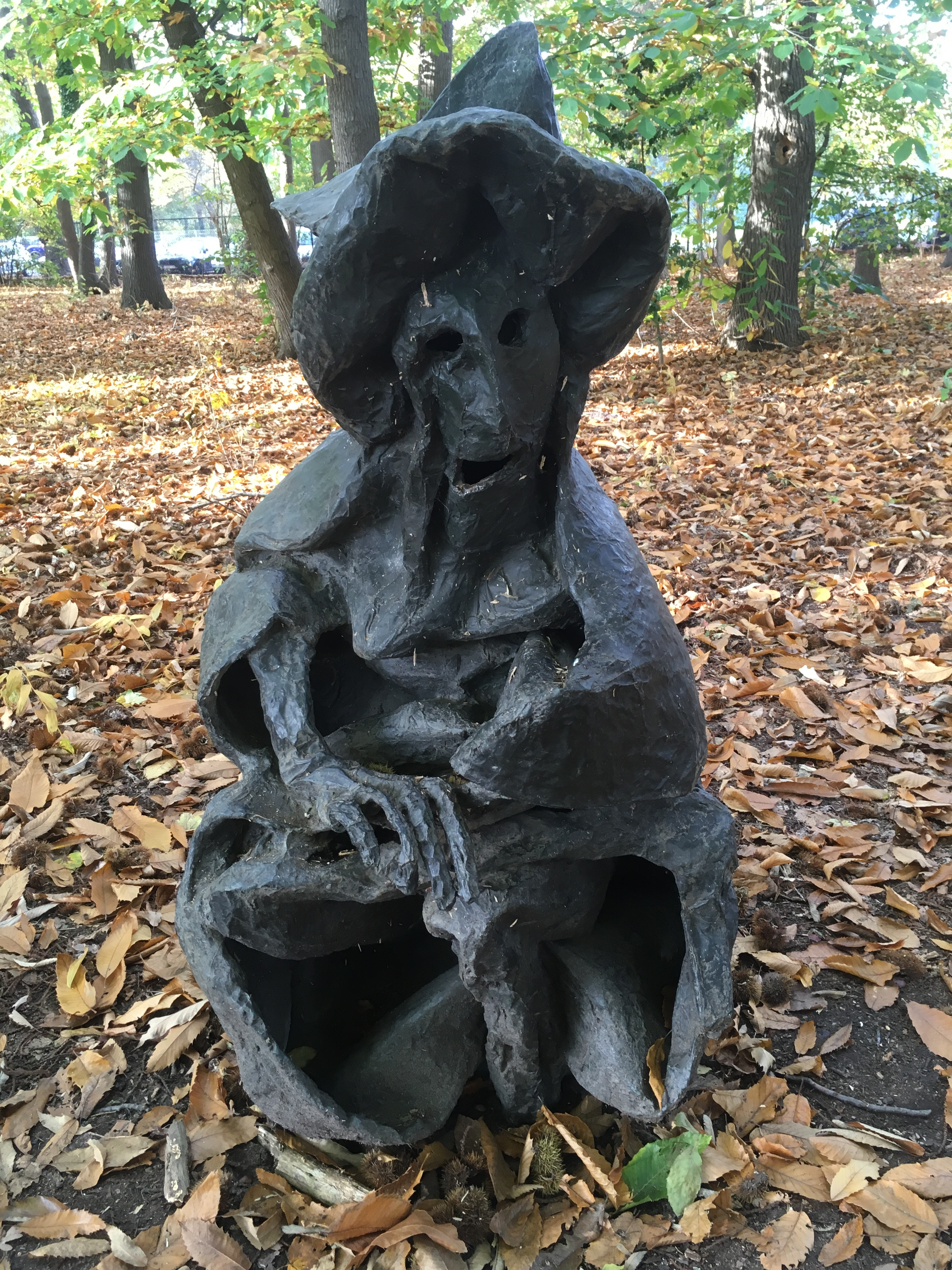
Lynch (1965)

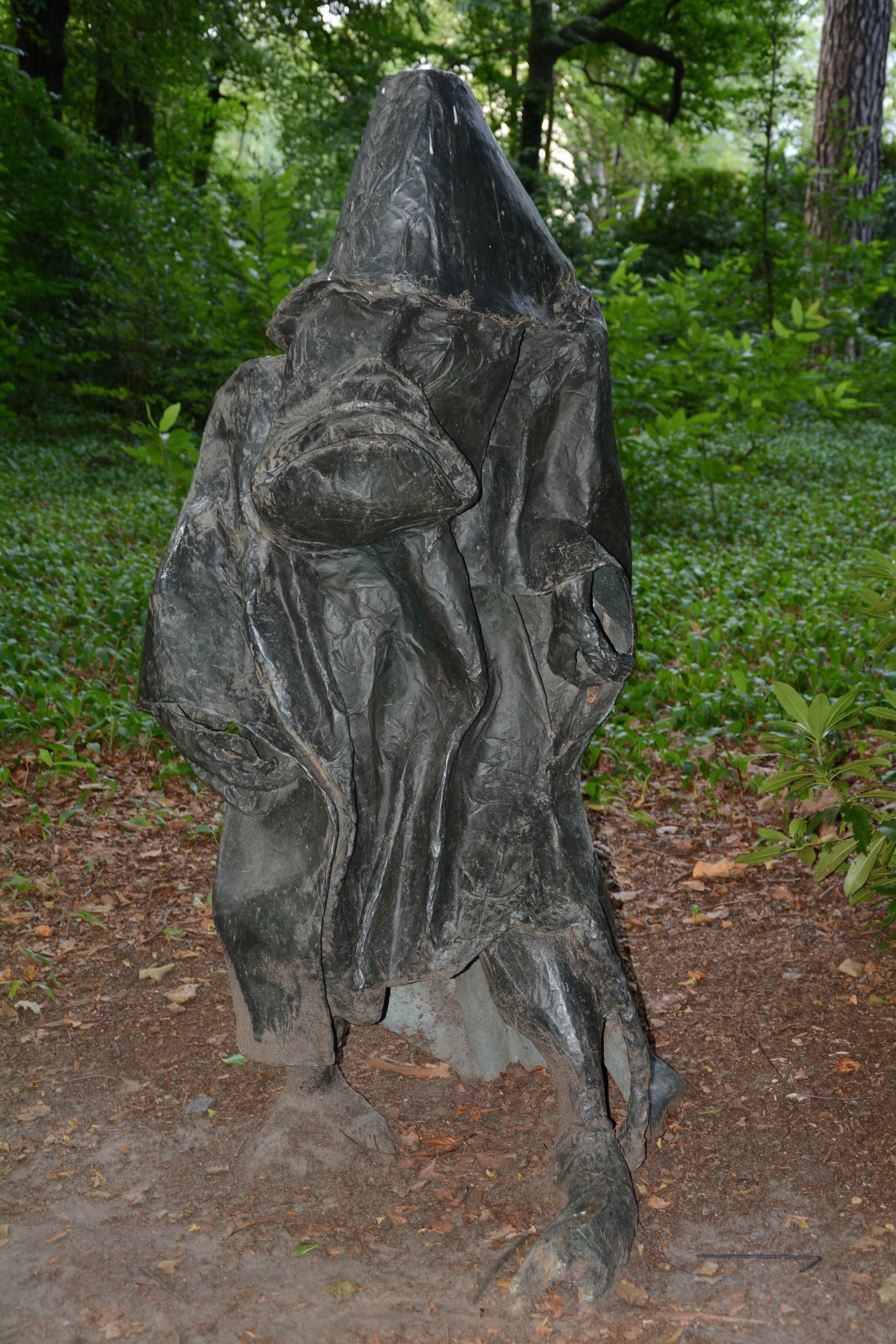
A Contre-Coeur (1965)
