= Vievy-le-Rayé =

- Commune
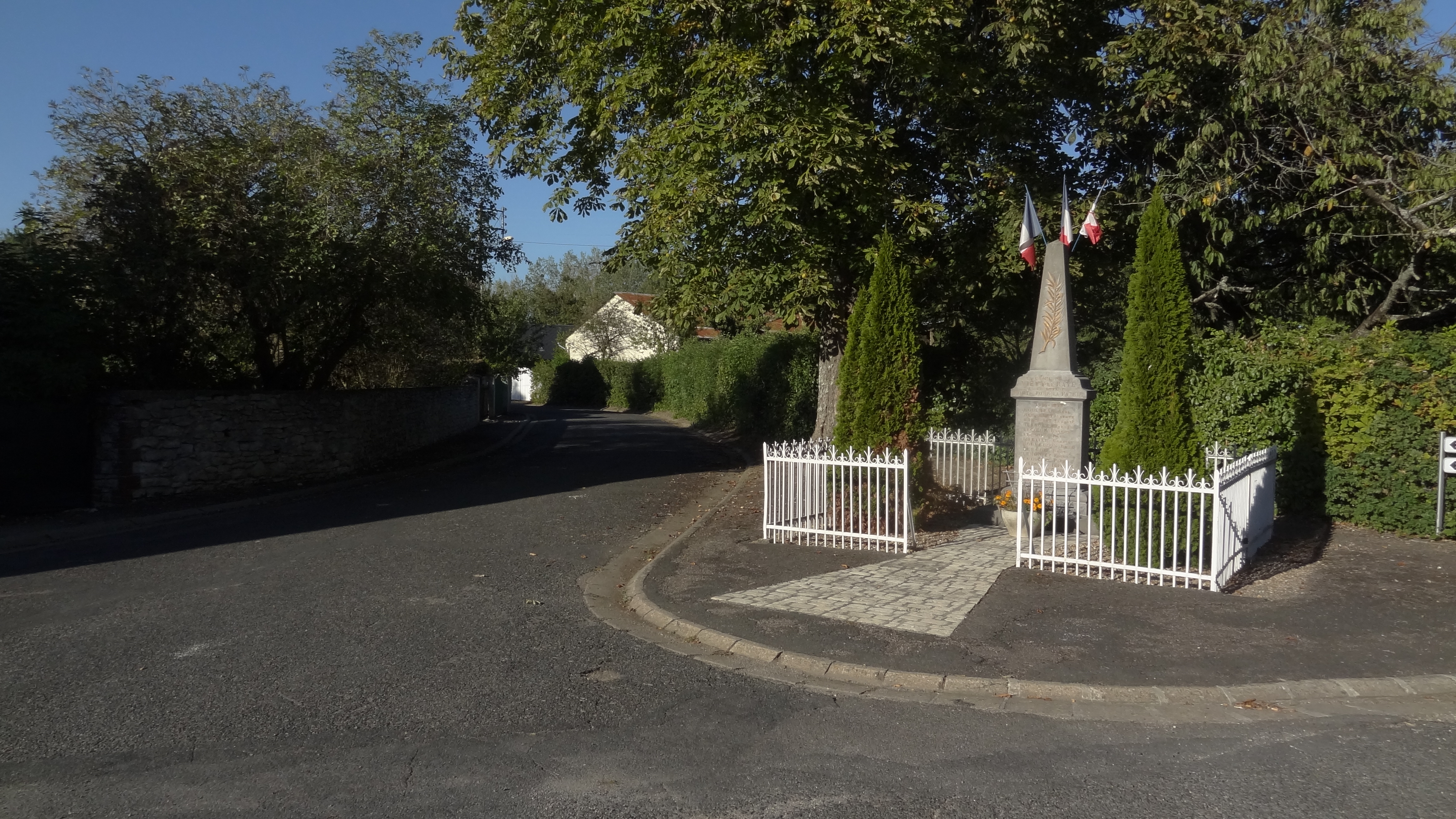
- War memorial

- Coat of arms
- Location of Vievy-le-Rayé
- Location within France Location within Centre-Val de Loire
- Coordinates: 47°51′57″N 1°18′54″E
- Country: France
- Region: Centre-Val de Loire
- Department: Loir-et-Cher
- Arrondissement: Blois
- Canton: La Beauce
- Intercommunality: Beauce Val de Loire

Government
  - Mayor (2020–2026): Jacques Bouvier
- Area^{1}: 45.12 km^{2} (17.42 sq mi)
- Elevation: 125 m (410 ft)
- Highest elevation: 152 m (499 ft)
- Lowest elevation: 99 m (325 ft)
- Population (2023): 470
  - Density: 10/km^{2} (27/sq mi)
- Time zone: UTC+01:00 (CET)
  - Summer (DST): UTC+02:00 (CEST)
- INSEE/Postal code: 41273 /41290
- ^{1} French Land Register data, which excludes lakes, ponds, glaciers > 1 km^{2} (0.386 sq mi or 247 acres) and river estuaries.

Vievy-le-Rayé (French pronunciation: [vjɛvi lə ʁɛje]) is a commune in the Loir-et-Cher department in central France.

It includes the former communes of La Bosse and Écoman, which were merged into Vievy-le-Rayé in 1972.

== Population ==
Population data refer to the area corresponding with the commune as of January 2025.

Historical population
| Year | Pop. | ±% p.a. |
|---|---|---|
| 1968 | 618 | — |
| 1975 | 575 | −1.02% |
| 1982 | 500 | −1.98% |
| 1990 | 469 | −0.80% |
| 1999 | 461 | −0.19% |
| 2007 | 488 | +0.71% |
| 2012 | 484 | −0.16% |
| 2017 | 453 | −1.32% |
| 2023 | 470 | +0.62% |
Source: INSEE

== See also ==
- Communes of the Loir-et-Cher department
