= Jean Benoît =

Canadian artist (1922–2010)

- Born: August 27, 1922; Quebec City
- Died: August 20, 2010 (aged 87); Paris
- Education: École des Beaux-Arts de Montréal
- Movement: Surrealism
- Spouse: Mimi Parent (m. 1948)

Jean Benoît (1922–2010) was a Canadian artist known as "The Enchanter of Serpents", most famous for his surrealist sculptures.

He was born in Quebec City in 1922 and studied art at the École des Beaux-Arts de Montréal, where he met Mimi Parent, whom he married in 1948. He met André Breton in 1959, and joined the Surrealist group that same year. In 1959, he also performed Exécution Du Testament Du Marquis De Sade, for which he made costumes. The dark, grotesque characters wore sharp, seemingly mechanical pieces mixing biomorphic, animalistic shapes that make the humans look like torture devices. Breton mentioned Benoit in Surrealism and Painting: "STAND ASIDE to let the Marquis de Sade pass 'in his own likeness' and reinvented by Jean Benoît with all his powers." One sculpture called "Book Cover for Magnetic Fields" features demonic figures ripping an egg from a book. Magnetic Fields was the name of the book Breton wrote with Philippe Soupault, which Breton called the first surrealist book. Many of his works include demonic figures, brutal sexual images, exaggerated phalluses, and so on.

Benoît was active and remained productive, working every day on his art until he died on August 20, 2010, in Paris. He was 88. The memorial service was scheduled for September 11, 2010 at the Père Lachaise Cemetery in Paris by the Benoît family.

He is the subject of Deco Dawson's 2012 short film Keep a Modest Head.
