= Canadian federal election results in Western Montreal =

Electoral history
Year	Results
2021	
2019	
2015	
2011	
2008	
2006	
2004	
2000	
1997	
1993	
1988	
1984	
1980	
1979	
1974	
1972	
1968	
1965	
1963	
1962	
1958	
1957	
1953	
1949	
1945	
1940	
1935	
1930	
1926	
1925	

Canadian federal elections have provided the following results in Western Montreal.

== Regional profile ==
For decades, Montreal had some of the most highly polarized political geography in Canada. While the sovereigntist Bloc Québécois dominated the mostly francophone East End for 20 years, the largely anglophone and allophone western portions of the city have been a Liberal and federalist fortress for over six decades, being to the Liberals what rural Alberta is to the Conservatives. The region is home to some of the safest Liberal ridings in the nation (e.g. Mount Royal and Saint-Laurent—Cartierville). Even in the surge of support for Brian Mulroney in Quebec in 1984 and 1988, the Liberals took the most seats in this region. This continued amid the Liberal meltdown in Quebec in 2006, although one seat at the eastern end of the area was lost to the Bloc. Before 2011, 1984 was the only election in recent memory in which traditional Liberal dominance was seriously threatened in this region. Two former Prime Ministers, Paul Martin and Pierre Trudeau, represented ridings in this area.

Nevertheless, in 2011, several Liberal bastions, such as Notre-Dame-de-Grâce—Lachine, LaSalle—Émard (Martin's former riding), and Pierrefonds—Dollard, fell to the New Democratic surge felt throughout Quebec. Additionally, the Conservatives came very close to taking Mount Royal (Trudeau's former riding), which has been in Liberal hands since 1940. Ultimately, the NDP took five of the region's nine seats, with the Liberals holding the remainder. The region reverted to form in 2015, with the Liberals taking every seat here except Outremont, the riding of NDP leader Tom Mulcair.

The West End returned to a Liberal sweep when Mulcair resigned and the Liberals seized Outremont in the ensuing by-election. In 2019, the Liberals dominated the region, taking every riding by 11,000 votes or more.

=== Votes by party throughout time ===
Election	Liberal	Conservative	New Democratic	Bloc Québécois	Green	People's	PC	Reform / Alliance	Social Credit	Others
1979	296,807; 73.5%	—	27,040; 6.7%	—	—	—	51,717; 12.8%	—	14,792; 3.7%	13,486; 3.3%
1980	250,591; 72.7%	—	35,006; 10.1%	—	—	—	46,863; 13.6%	—	599; 0.2%	11,831; 3.4%
1984	156,709; 40.6%	—	48,054; 12.5%	—	890; 0.2%	—	160,387; 41.6%	—	—	19,781; 5.1%
1988	189,176; 44.4%	—	46,838; 11.0%	—	6,490; 1.5%	—	173,354; 40.7%	—	—	9,854; 2.3%
1993	278,290; 63.3%	—	10,077; 2.3%	101,837; 23.2%	598; 0.1%	—	36,373; 8.3%	—	—	12,432; 2.8%
1997	278,368; 60.8%	—	14,303; 3.1%	73,432; 16.0%	751; 0.2%	—	70,565; 15.4%	3,751; 0.8%	—	16,521; 3.6%
2000	272,042; 66.0%	—	12,914; 3.1%	64,919; 15.8%	5,368; 1.3%	—	27,119; 6.6%	19,963; 4.8%	—	9,785; 2.4%
2004	224,636; 57.5%	32,601; 8.3%	29,668; 7.6%	83,512; 21.4%	15,046; 3.9%	—	—	—	—	5,177; 1.3%
2006	192,906; 47.6%	69,844; 17.2%	41,345; 10.2%	78,337; 19.3%	21,514; 5.3%	—	—	—	—	1,669; 0.4%
2008	172,774; 45.0%	69,938; 18.2%	62,538; 16.3%	55,326; 14.4%	20,742; 5.4%	—	—	—	—	2,360; 0.6%
2011	127,149; 31.7%	76,704; 19.1%	147,091; 36.6%	36,444; 9.1%	12,156; 3.0%	—	—	—	—	1,830; 0.5%
2015	246,723; 53.3%	75,902; 16.4%	95,674; 20.7%	30,270; 6.5%	12,917; 2.8%	—	—	—	—	1,456; 0.3%
2019	240,226; 53.6%	59,080; 13.2%	59,805; 13.3%	48,832; 10.9%	32,195; 7.2%	4,834; 1.1%	—	—	—	3,115; 0.7%
2021	218,878; 52.7%	63,311; 15.3%	64,135; 15.5%	43,897; 10.6%	10,117; 2.4%	13,115; 3.2%	—	—	—	1,592; 0.4%
2025	275,075; 59.1%	108,070; 23.2%	27,230; 5.9%	39,808; 8.6%	10,554; 2.3%	2,168; 0.5%	—	—	—	2,231; 0.5%

Election statistics in Western Montreal

Liberal Conservative New Democratic Bloc Québécois	Green Progressive Conservative (defunct) Alliance / Reform (defunct)

== Detailed results ==
=== 2021 ===
Electoral district	Candidates							Incumbent
Electoral district	Liberal	Conservative	BQ	NDP	Green	PPC	Other	Incumbent
Dorval—Lachine—LaSalle	Anju Dhillon; 25,233; 52.41%	Jude Bazelais; 5,754; 11.95%	Cloé Rose Jenneau; 7,542; 15.67%	Fabiola Ngamaleu Teumeni; 6,241; 12.96%	Laura Mariani; 1,351; 2.81%	Michael Patterson; 2,020; 4.20%		Anju Dhillon
Lac-Saint-Louis	Francis Scarpaleggia; 32,477; 56.26%	Ann Francis; 10,911; 18.90%	Rémi Lebeuf; 3,078; 5.33%	Jonathan Gray; 7,679; 13.30%	Milan Kona-Mancini; 1,868; 3.24%	Afia Lassy; 1,712; 2.97%		Francis Scarpaleggia
LaSalle—Émard—Verdun	David Lametti; 20,330; 42.93%	Janina Moran; 3,530; 7.45%	Raphaël Guérard; 10,461; 22.09%	Jason De Lierre; 9,168; 19.36%	Sarah Carter; 1,439; 3.04%	Michel Walsh; 1,600; 3.38%	Pascal Antonin (FPC); 636 1.34%	David Lametti
LaSalle—Émard—Verdun	David Lametti; 20,330; 42.93%	Janina Moran; 3,530; 7.45%	Raphaël Guérard; 10,461; 22.09%	Jason De Lierre; 9,168; 19.36%	Sarah Carter; 1,439; 3.04%	Michel Walsh; 1,600; 3.38%	JP Fortin (Comm.); 196 0.41%	David Lametti
Mount Royal	Anthony Housefather; 23,284; 57.69%	Frank Cavallaro; 9,889; 24.50%	Yegor Komarov; 1,585; 3.93%	Ibrahim Bruno El-Khoury; 3,381; 8.38%	Clement Badra; 1,083; 2.68%	Zachary Lozoff; 1,051; 2.60%	Diane Johnston (M-L); 89; 0.22%	Anthony Housefather
Notre-Dame-de-Grâce—Westmount	Marc Garneau; 24,510; 53.76%	Mathew Kaminski; 6,412; 14.06%	Jordan Craig Larouche; 2,407; 5.28%	Emma Elbourne-Weinstock; 8,753; 19.20%	Sam Fairbrother; 1,835; 4.02%	David Freiheit; 1,498; 3.29%	Rachel Hoffman (M-L); 117 0.26%	Marc Garneau
Notre-Dame-de-Grâce—Westmount	Marc Garneau; 24,510; 53.76%	Mathew Kaminski; 6,412; 14.06%	Jordan Craig Larouche; 2,407; 5.28%	Emma Elbourne-Weinstock; 8,753; 19.20%	Sam Fairbrother; 1,835; 4.02%	David Freiheit; 1,498; 3.29%	Geofryde Wandji (CHP); 59 0.13%	Marc Garneau
Outremont	Rachel Bendayan; 16,714; 45.39%	Jasmine Louras; 2,882; 7.83%	Célia Grimard; 5,535; 15.03%	Ève Péclet; 9,579; 26.02%	Grace Tarabey; 1,198; 3.25%	Yehuda Pinto; 819; 2.22%	Angela-Angie Joshi (Ind.); 93; 0.25%	Rachel Bendayan
Pierrefonds—Dollard	Sameer Zuberi; 29,296; 56.01%	Terry Roberts; 10,893; 20.83%	Nadia Bourque; 4,141; 7.92%	Maninderjit Kaur Tumbar; 6,034; 11.54%		Mark Sibthorpe; 1,942; 3.71%		Sameer Zuberi
Saint-Laurent	Emmanuella Lambropoulos; 22,056; 59.10%	Richard Serour; 6,902; 18.50%	Florence Racicot; 2,972; 7.96%	Nathan Devereaux; 4,059; 10.88%		Gregory Yablunovsky; 1,182; 3.17%	Ginette Boutet (M-L); 146; 0.39%	Emmanuella Lambropoulos
Ville-Marie—Le Sud-Ouest—Île-des-Sœurs	Marc Miller; 24,978; 50.54%	Steve Shanahan; 6,138; 12.42%	Soledad Orihuela-Bouchard; 6,176; 12.50%	Sophie Thiébaut; 9,241; 18.70%	Cynthia Charbonneau-Lavictoire; 1,343; 2.72%	Denise Dubé; 1,291; 2.61%	Linda Sullivan (M-L); 122 0.25%	
Ville-Marie—Le Sud-Ouest—Île-des-Sœurs	Marc Miller; 24,978; 50.54%	Steve Shanahan; 6,138; 12.42%	Soledad Orihuela-Bouchard; 6,176; 12.50%	Sophie Thiébaut; 9,241; 18.70%	Cynthia Charbonneau-Lavictoire; 1,343; 2.72%	Denise Dubé; 1,291; 2.61%	Hans Armando Vargas (Mar.); 134 0.27%	Marc Miller

=== 2019 ===
Electoral district	Candidates								Incumbent
Electoral district	Liberal	Conservative	BQ	NDP	Green	Marxist-Leninist	PPC	Other	Incumbent
Dorval—Lachine—LaSalle	Anju Dhillon; 27,821; 52.92%	Céline Laquerre; 5,543; 10.54%	Jean-Frédéric Vaudry; 8,974; 17.07%	Lori Morrison; 6,207; 11.81%	Réjean Malette; 2,898; 5.51%		Arash Torbati; 528; 1.00%	Fang Hu (PC); 426; 0.81% Xavier Watso (Rhino.); 177; 0.34%	Anju Dhillon
Lac-Saint-Louis	Francis Scarpaleggia; 34,622; 58.16%	Ann Francis; 9,083; 15.26%	Julie Benoît; 3,169; 5.32%	Dana Chevalier; 7,263; 12.20%	Milan Kona-Mancini; 4,176; 7.02%		Gary Charles; 805; 1.35%	Ralston Coelho (CNP); 28; 0.05% Victoria de Martigny (Animal); 379; 0.64%	Francis Scarpaleggia
LaSalle—Émard—Verdun	David Lametti; 22,803; 43.52%	Claudio Rocchi; 3,690; 7.04%	Isabel Dion; 12,619; 24.09%	Steven Scott; 8,628; 16.47%	Jency Mercier; 3,583; 6.84%	Eileen Studd; 39; 0.07%	Daniel Turgeon; 490; 0.94%	Rhino Jacques Bélanger (Rhino.); 265; 0.51% Julien Côté (Ind.); 274; 0.52%	David Lametti
Mount Royal	Anthony Housefather; 24,590; 56.30%	David Tordjman; 10,887; 24.93%	Xavier Levesque; 1,757; 4.02%	Eric-Abel Baland; 3,609; 8.26%	Clément Badra; 2,389; 5.47%	Diane Johnston; 85; 0.19%	Zachary Lozoff; 362; 0.83%		Anthony Housefather
Notre-Dame-de-Grâce—Westmount	Marc Garneau; 28,323; 56.28%	Neil Drabkin; 5,759; 11.44%	Jennifer Jetté; 2,359; 4.69%	Franklin Gertler; 7,753; 15.41%	Robert Green; 5,397; 10.73%	Rachel Hoffman; 67; 0.13%	André Valiquette; 565; 1.12%	Jeffery A. Thomas (Ind.); 98; 0.19%	Marc Garneau
Outremont	Rachel Bendayan; 19,148; 46.19%	Jasmine Louras; 2,707; 6.53%	Célia Grimard; 5,741; 13.85%	Andrea Clarke; 8,319; 20.07%	Daniel Green; 5,018; 12.10%		Sabin Lévesque; 369; 0.89%	Mark John Hiemstra (Rhino.); 155; 0.37%	Rachel Bendayan
Pierrefonds—Dollard	Sameer Zuberi; 31,305; 56.43%	Mariam Ishak; 9,797; 17.66%	Edline Henri; 4,469; 8.06%	Bruno Ibrahim El-Khoury; 5,687; 10.25%	Lisa Mintz; 2,866; 5.17%		Lee Weishar; 711; 1.28%	Shahid Khan (Ind.); 242; 0.44% Martin Plante (Ind.); 394; 0.71%	Frank Baylis†$
Saint-Laurent	Emmanuella Lambropoulos; 23,527; 58.60%	Richard Serour; 7,005; 17.45%	Thérèse Miljours; 2,845; 7.09%	Miranda Gallo; 4,065; 10.13%	Georgia Kokotsis; 2,150; 5.36%	Ginette Boutet; 71; 0.18%	Christopher Mikus; 484; 1.21%		Emmanuella Lambropoulos
Ville-Marie–Le Sud-Ouest–Île-des-Sœurs	Marc Miller; 28,087; 53.48%	Michael Forian; 4,609; 8.78%	Nadia Bourque; 6,899; 13.14%	Sophie Thiébaut; 8,274; 15.75%	Liana Canton Cusmano; 3,718; 7.08%	Linda Sullivan; 45; 0.09%	Jean Langlais; 520; 0.99%	Tommy Gaudet (Rhino.); 140; 0.27% Louise B. O'Sullivan (Ind.); 117; 0.22% Marc Patenaude (NA); 113; 0.22%	Marc Miller

=== 2015 ===
Electoral district	Candidates						Incumbent
Electoral district	Conservative	NDP	Liberal	BQ	Green	Other	Incumbent
Dorval—Lachine—LaSalle	Daniela Chivu; 6,049; 11.08%	Isabelle Morin; 11,769; 21.55%	Anju Dhillon; 29,974; 54.89%	Jean-Frédéric Vaudry; 5,338; 9.78%	Vincent J. Carbonneau; 1,245; 2.28%	Soulèye Ndiaye (Ind.); 230; 0.42%	Isabelle Morin; Notre-Dame-de-Grâce—Lachine
Lac-Saint-Louis	Eric Girard; 10,857; 17.42%	Ryan Young; 7,997; 12.83%	Francis Scarpaleggia; 39,965; 64.14%	Gabriel Bernier; 1,681; 2.70%	Bradford Dean; 1,812; 2.91%		Francis Scarpaleggia
LaSalle—Émard—Verdun	Mohammad Zamir; 3,713; 6.91%	Hélène LeBlanc; 15,566; 28.95%	David Lametti; 23,603; 43.90%	Gilbert Paquette; 9,164; 17.05%	Lorraine Banville; 1,717; 3.19%		Hélène LeBlanc; LaSalle—Émard
Mount Royal	Robert Libman; 18,201; 37.88%	Mario Jacinto Rimbao; 3,884; 8.08%	Anthony Housefather; 24,187; 50.34%	Jade Bossé-Bélanger; 908; 1.89%	Timothy Landry; 747; 1.55%	Diane Johnston (M-L); 124; 0.26%	Irwin Cotler†
Notre-Dame-de-Grâce—Westmount	Richard Sagala; 7,414; 14.37%	James Hughes; 11,229; 21.76%	Marc Garneau; 29,755; 57.67%	Simon Quesnel; 1,282; 2.48%	Melissa Kate Wheeler; 1,581; 3.06%	Lisa Julie Cahn (Ind.); 151 0.29%	Marc Garneau; Westmount—Ville-Marie
Notre-Dame-de-Grâce—Westmount	Richard Sagala; 7,414; 14.37%	James Hughes; 11,229; 21.76%	Marc Garneau; 29,755; 57.67%	Simon Quesnel; 1,282; 2.48%	Melissa Kate Wheeler; 1,581; 3.06%	Rachel Hoffman (M-L); 181 0.35%	Marc Garneau; Westmount—Ville-Marie
Outremont	Rodolphe Husny; 4,159; 9.53%	Tom Mulcair; 19,242; 44.11%	Rachel Bendayan; 14,597; 33.46%	Roger Galland Barou; 3,668; 8.41%	Amara Diallo; 1,575; 3.61%	Francis Pouliot (Libert.); 216 0.50%	Tom Mulcair
Outremont	Rodolphe Husny; 4,159; 9.53%	Tom Mulcair; 19,242; 44.11%	Rachel Bendayan; 14,597; 33.46%	Roger Galland Barou; 3,668; 8.41%	Amara Diallo; 1,575; 3.61%	Adrien Welsh (Comm.); 162 0.37%	Tom Mulcair
Pierrefonds—Dollard	Valérie Assouline; 11,694; 19.99%	Lysane Blanchette-Lamothe; 9,584; 16.38%	Frank Baylis; 34,319; 58.66%	Natalie Laplante; 2,043; 3.49%	Abraham Weizfeld; 865; 1.48%		Lysane Blanchette-Lamothe
Saint-Laurent	Jimmy Yu; 7,867; 19.51%	Alain Ackad; 4,646; 11.52%	Stéphane Dion; 24,832; 61.57%	Pascal-Olivier Dumas-Dubreuil; 1,879; 4.66%	John Tromp; 977; 2.42%	Fernand Deschamps (M-L); 129; 0.32%	Stéphane Dion; Saint-Laurent—Cartierville
Ville-Marie–Le Sud-Ouest–Île-des-Sœurs	Steve Shanahan; 5,948; 11.86%	Allison Turner; 11,757; 23.44%	Marc Miller; 25,491; 50.82%	Chantal St-Onge; 4,307; 8.59%	Daniel Green; 2,398; 4.78%	William Sloan (Comm.); 102 0.20%	Tyrone Benskin§ Jeanne-Le Ber
Ville-Marie–Le Sud-Ouest–Île-des-Sœurs	Steve Shanahan; 5,948; 11.86%	Allison Turner; 11,757; 23.44%	Marc Miller; 25,491; 50.82%	Chantal St-Onge; 4,307; 8.59%	Daniel Green; 2,398; 4.78%	Daniel Wolfe (Rhino.); 161 0.32%	Tyrone Benskin§ Jeanne-Le Ber

=== 2011 ===
Electoral district	Candidates							Incumbent
Electoral district	BQ	Conservative	Liberal	NDP	Green	Marxist-Leninist	Other	Incumbent
Jeanne-Le Ber	Thierry St-Cyr; 12,635; 24.22%	Pierre Lafontaine; 4,678; 8.97%	Mark Bruneau; 10,054; 19.28%	Tyrone Benskin; 23,293; 44.66%	Richard Noël; 1,377; 2.64%	Eileen Studd; 121; 0.23%		Thierry St-Cyr
Lac-Saint-Louis	Éric Taillefer; 1,689; 3.12%	Larry Smith; 15,394; 28.45%	Francis Scarpaleggia; 18,457; 34.11%	Alain Ackad; 16,253; 30.04%	Bruno Tremblay; 2,315; 4.28%			Francis Scarpaleggia
LaSalle—Émard	Carl Dubois; 6,151; 14.66%	Chang-Tao Jimmy Yu; 5,516; 13.14%	Lise Zarac; 11,172; 26.62%	Hélène LeBlanc; 17,691; 42.15%	Lorraine Banville; 946; 2.25%	Yves Le Seigle; 288; 0.69%	Guillaume Berger-Richard (Rhino); 208; 0.50%	Lise Zarac
Mount Royal	Gabriel Dumais; 1,136; 2.91%	Saulie Zajdel; 13,891; 35.61%	Irwin Cotler; 16,151; 41.41%	Jeff Itcush; 6,963; 17.85%	Brian Sarwer-Foner; 683; 1.75%	Diane Johnston; 109; 0.28%	Abraham Weizfeld (NA); 74; 0.19%	Irwin Cotler
Notre-Dame-de-Grâce—Lachine	Gabrielle Ladouceur-Despins; 3,983; 8.82%	Matthew Conway; 6,574; 14.56%	Marlene Jennings; 14,407; 31.90%	Isabelle Morin; 17,943; 39.73%	Jessica Gal; 1,914; 4.24%	Rachel Hoffman; 131; 0.29%	David Andrew Lovett (Ind.); 207; 0.46%	Marlene Jennings
Outremont	Élise Daoust; 3,199; 8.23%	Rodolphe Husny; 3,408; 8.77%	Martin Cauchon; 9,204; 23.69%	Thomas Mulcair; 21,906; 56.37%	Francois Pilon; 838; 2.16%		Johan Boyden (Comm.); 143 0.37%	Thomas Mulcair
Outremont	Élise Daoust; 3,199; 8.23%	Rodolphe Husny; 3,408; 8.77%	Martin Cauchon; 9,204; 23.69%	Thomas Mulcair; 21,906; 56.37%	Francois Pilon; 838; 2.16%		Tommy Gaudet (Rhino); 160 0.41%	Thomas Mulcair
Pierrefonds—Dollard	Nicolas Jolicoeur; 2,392; 4.98%	Agop Evereklian; 12,901; 26.86%	Bernard Patry; 14,632; 30.47%	Lysane Blanchette-Lamothe 16,390; 34.13%	Jonathan Lumer; 1,710; 3.56%			Bernard Patry
Saint-Laurent—Cartierville	William Fayad; 2,981; 7.30%	Svetlana Litvin; 7,124; 17.46%	Stéphane Dion; 17,726; 43.43%	Maria Ximena Florez; 11,948; 29.28%	Tim Landry; 857; 2.10%	Fernand Deschamps; 176; 0.43%		Stéphane Dion
Westmount—Ville-Marie	Véronique Roy; 2,278; 5.52%	Neil Drabkin; 7,218; 17.49%	Marc Garneau; 15,346; 37.18%	Joanne Corbeil; 14,704; 35.62%	Andrew Carkner; 1,516; 3.67%		Victoria Haliburton (Rhino); 140 0.34%	Marc Garneau
Westmount—Ville-Marie	Véronique Roy; 2,278; 5.52%	Neil Drabkin; 7,218; 17.49%	Marc Garneau; 15,346; 37.18%	Joanne Corbeil; 14,704; 35.62%	Andrew Carkner; 1,516; 3.67%		Bill Sloan (Comm.); 73 0.18%	Marc Garneau

=== 2008 ===
Electoral district	Candidates							Incumbent
Electoral district	BQ	Conservative	Liberal	NDP	Green	Marxist-Leninist	Other	Incumbent
Jeanne-Le Ber	Thierry St-Cyr; 17,144; 34.91%	Daniel Beaudin; 5,494; 11.19%	Christian P. Feuillette; 15,841; 32.26%	Daniel Breton; 7,708; 15.70%	Véronik Sansoucy; 2,345; 4.78%		Darryl Gray (Ind.); 577; 1.17%	Thierry St-Cyr
Lac-Saint-Louis	Maxime Clément; 2,953; 5.75%	Andrea Paine; 12,085; 23.51%	Francis Scarpaleggia; 23,842; 46.39%	Daniel Quinn; 8,105; 15.77%	Peter Graham; 4,415; 8.59%			Francis Scarpaleggia
LaSalle—Émard	Frédéric Isaya; 10,384; 24.47%	Béatrice Guay-Pepper; 6,802; 16.03%	Lise Zarac; 17,226; 40.60%	Amy Darwish; 5,622; 13.25%	Kristina Vitelli; 1,579; 3.72%	Yves Le Seigle; 144; 0.34%	Antoine Kaluzny (Ind.); 674; 1.59%	Paul Martin†
Mount Royal	Maryse Lavallée; 1,543; 4.36%	Rafael Tzoubari; 9,676; 27.33%	Irwin Cotler; 19,702; 55.65%	Nicolas Thibodeau; 2,733; 7.72%	Tyrell Alexander; 1,565; 4.42%	Diane Johnston; 97; 0.27%	Antonio Artuso (Comm.); 89; 0.25%	Irwin Cotler
Notre-Dame-de-Grâce—Lachine	Eric Taillefer; 6,962; 15.89%	Carmine Pontillo; 7,108; 16.22%	Marlene Jennings; 19,554; 44.62%	Peter Deslauriers; 6,641; 15.16%	Jessica Gal; 3,378; 7.71%	Rachel Hoffman; 177; 0.40%		Marlene Jennings
Outremont	Marcela Valdivia; 4,554; 12.55%	Lulzim Laloshi; 3,820; 10.53%	Sébastien Dhavernas; 12,005; 33.08%	Thomas Mulcair; 14,348; 39.53%	F. Monsieur Corde à Linge Pilon; 1,566; 4.31%			Thomas Mulcair
Pierrefonds—Dollard	Reny Gagnon; 4,357; 9.53%	Pierre-Olivier Brunelle; 11,815; 25.83%	Bernard Patry; 21,468; 46.94%	Shameem Siddiqui; 4,823; 10.55%	Ryan Young; 3,161; 6.91%	Marsha Fine; 111; 0.24%		Bernard Patry
Saint-Laurent—Cartierville	Jacques Lachaîne; 4,611; 11.34%	Dennis Galiatsatos; 6,999; 17.21%	Stéphane Dion; 25,095; 61.72%	Jerome Rodrigues; 3,654; 8.99%		Fernand Deschamps; 299; 0.74%		Stéphane Dion
Westmount—Ville-Marie	Charles Larivée; 2,818; 7.26%	Guy Dufort; 6,139; 15.81%	Marc Garneau; 18,041; 46.47%	Anne Lagacé Dowson; 8,904; 22.93%	Claude William Genest; 2,733; 7.04%	Linda Sullivan; 49; 0.13%	David Sommer Rovins (Ind.); 47 0.12%	Vacant
Westmount—Ville-Marie	Charles Larivée; 2,818; 7.26%	Guy Dufort; 6,139; 15.81%	Marc Garneau; 18,041; 46.47%	Anne Lagacé Dowson; 8,904; 22.93%	Claude William Genest; 2,733; 7.04%	Linda Sullivan; 49; 0.13%	Bill Sloan (Comm.); 34 0.09%	Vacant
Westmount—Ville-Marie	Charles Larivée; 2,818; 7.26%	Guy Dufort; 6,139; 15.81%	Marc Garneau; 18,041; 46.47%	Anne Lagacé Dowson; 8,904; 22.93%	Claude William Genest; 2,733; 7.04%	Linda Sullivan; 49; 0.13%	Judith Vienneau (Rhino.); 62 0.16%	Vacant

=== 2006 ===
Electoral district	Candidates							Incumbent
Electoral district	BQ	Liberal	Conservative	NDP	Green	Marxist-Leninist	Other	Incumbent
Jeanne-Le Ber	Thierry St-Cyr; 20,213; 40.22%	Liza Frulla; 17,118; 34.06%	Pierre-Olivier Brunelle; 5,951; 11.84%	Matthew McLauchlin; 4,621; 9.19%	Claude William Genest; 2,357; 4.69%			Liza Frulla
Lac-Saint-Louis	Anne-Marie Guertin; 4,064; 7.65%	Francis Scarpaleggia; 25,588; 48.17%	Andrea Paine; 14,164; 26.66%	Daniel Quinn; 5,702; 10.73%	Peter Graham; 3,605; 6.79%			Francis Scarpaleggia
LaSalle—Émard	May Chiu; 13,501; 28.73%	Paul Martin; 22,751; 48.41%	Georges-Alexandre Bastien; 5,994; 12.75%	Russ Johnson; 2,805; 5.97%	Serge Bellemare; 1,512; 3.22%	Jean-Paul Bédard; 152; 0.32%	Jean-Philippe Lebleu (Ind.); 281; 0.60%	Paul Martin
Mount Royal	Guillaume Dussault; 2,112; 5.71%	Irwin Cotler; 24,248; 65.55%	Neil Martin Drabkin; 6,621; 17.90%	Nicolas R. Thibodeau; 2,479; 6.70%	Damien Pichereau; 1,423; 3.85%	Diane Johnston; 106; 0.29%		Irwin Cotler
Notre-Dame-de-Grâce—Lachine	Alexandre Lambert; 9,385; 20.34%	Marlene Jennings; 20,235; 43.85%	Allen F. Mackenzie; 8,048; 17.44%	Peter Deslauriers; 5,455; 11.82%	Pierre-Albert Sévigny; 2,754; 5.97%	Rachel Hoffman; 118; 0.26%	Earl Wertheimer (Libert.); 152; 0.33%	Marlene Jennings
Outremont	Jacques Léonard; 11,778; 29.01%	Jean-C. Lapierre; 14,282; 35.18%	Daniel Fournier; 5,168; 12.73%	Léo-Paul Lauzon; 6,984; 17.20%	François Pilon; 1,957; 4.82%	Linda Sullivan; 88; 0.22%	Eric Roach Denis (Ind.); 101 0.25%	Jean Lapierre
Outremont	Jacques Léonard; 11,778; 29.01%	Jean-C. Lapierre; 14,282; 35.18%	Daniel Fournier; 5,168; 12.73%	Léo-Paul Lauzon; 6,984; 17.20%	François Pilon; 1,957; 4.82%	Linda Sullivan; 88; 0.22%	Yan Lacombe (Ind.); 85 0.21%	Jean Lapierre
Outremont	Jacques Léonard; 11,778; 29.01%	Jean-C. Lapierre; 14,282; 35.18%	Daniel Fournier; 5,168; 12.73%	Léo-Paul Lauzon; 6,984; 17.20%	François Pilon; 1,957; 4.82%	Linda Sullivan; 88; 0.22%	Régent Millette (Ind.); 22 0.05%	Jean Lapierre
Outremont	Jacques Léonard; 11,778; 29.01%	Jean-C. Lapierre; 14,282; 35.18%	Daniel Fournier; 5,168; 12.73%	Léo-Paul Lauzon; 6,984; 17.20%	François Pilon; 1,957; 4.82%	Linda Sullivan; 88; 0.22%	Philip Paynter (PC); 94 0.23%	Jean Lapierre
Outremont	Jacques Léonard; 11,778; 29.01%	Jean-C. Lapierre; 14,282; 35.18%	Daniel Fournier; 5,168; 12.73%	Léo-Paul Lauzon; 6,984; 17.20%	François Pilon; 1,957; 4.82%	Linda Sullivan; 88; 0.22%	Xavier Rochon (Ind.); 34 0.08%	Jean Lapierre
Pierrefonds—Dollard	Denis Martel; 5,901; 12.37%	Bernard Patry; 24,388; 51.12%	Don Rae; 11,013; 23.08%	Shameem Siddiqui; 3,664; 7.68%	Leo Williams; 2,645; 5.54%	Garnet Colly; 96; 0.20%		Bernard Patry
Saint-Laurent—Cartierville	William Fayad; 6,192; 14.58%	Stéphane Dion; 25,412; 59.85%	Ishrat Alam; 5,590; 13.17%	Liz Elder; 3,279; 7.72%	Gilles Mercier; 1,810; 4.26%	Fernard Deschamps; 177; 0.42%		Stéphane Dion
Westmount—Ville-Marie	Sophie Fréchette; 5,191; 12.56%	Lucienne Robillard; 18,884; 45.68%	Louise O'Sullivan; 7,295; 17.65%	Eric Wilson Steedman; 6,356; 15.37%	Julie Sabourin; 3,451; 8.35%	Serge Lachapelle; 94; 0.23%	Bill Sloan (Comm.); 69; 0.17%	Lucienne Robillard

=== 2004 ===
Electoral district	Candidates								Incumbent
Electoral district	Liberal	BQ	Conservative	NDP	Green	Marijuana	Marxist-Leninist	Other	Incumbent
Jeanne-Le Ber	Liza Frulla; 18,766; 41.09%	Thierry St-Cyr; 18,694; 40.93%	Pierre-Albert Sévigny; 2,524; 5.53%	Anthony Philbin; 3,160; 6.92%	Jean Claude Mercier; 1,864; 4.08%	Cathy Duschene; 520; 1.14%	Normand Chouinard; 148; 0.32%		Liza Frulla; Verdun—Saint-Henri—Saint-Paul—Pointe Saint-Charles
Lac-Saint-Louis	Francis Scarpaleggia; 32,122; 63.91%	Maxime Côté; 5,106; 10.16%	Jeff Howard; 6,082; 12.10%	Daniel Quinn; 3,789; 7.54%	Peter Graham; 2,584; 5.14%	Patrick Cardinal; 578; 1.15%			Clifford Lincoln†
LaSalle—Émard	Paul Martin; 25,806; 56.55%	Thierry Larrivée; 14,001; 30.68%	Nicole Roy-Arcelin; 2,271; 4.98%	Rebecca Blaikie; 1,995; 4.37%	Douglas Jack; 1,000; 2.19%	Marc-Boris St-Maurice; 349; 0.76%	Jean-Paul Bédard; 210; 0.46%		Paul Martin
Mount Royal	Irwin Cotler; 28,670; 75.68%	Vincent Gagnon; 2,636; 6.96%	Matthew Fireman; 3,271; 8.63%	Sébastien Beaudet; 1,859; 4.91%	Adam Sommerfeld; 1,046; 2.76%	Adam Greenblatt; 308; 0.81%	Diane Johnston; 94; 0.25%		Irwin Cotler
Notre-Dame-de-Grâce—Lachine	Marlene Jennings; 23,552; 53.20%	Jean-Philippe Chartré; 9,736; 21.99%	William R. McCullock; 4,526; 10.22%	Maria Pia Chávez; 3,513; 7.93%	Jessica Gal; 2,214; 5.00%	Jay Dell; 479; 1.08%	Rachel Hoffman; 88; 0.20%	Earl Wertheimer (Libert.); 165; 0.37%	Marlene Jennings
Outremont	Jean Lapierre; 15,675; 40.94%	François Rebello; 12,730; 33.25%	Marc Rousseau; 2,284; 5.97%	Omar Aktouf; 5,382; 14.06%	Shaun Perceval-Maxwell; 1,643; 4.29%	Yan Lacombe; 452; 1.18%	Linda Sullivan; 120; 0.31%		Martin Cauchon†
Pierrefonds—Dollard	Bernard Patry; 29,601; 63.57%	Marie-Hélène Brunet; 7,426; 15.95%	Andrea Paine; 5,010; 10.76%	Danielle Lustgarten; 2,545; 5.47%	Theodore Kouretas; 1,401; 3.01%	Jean-François Labrecque; 511; 1.10%	Garnet Colly; 71; 0.15%		Bernard Patry
Saint-Laurent—Cartierville	Stéphane Dion; 28,107; 66.82%	William Fayad; 7,261; 17.26%	Marc Rahmé; 2,606; 6.20%	Zaid Mahayni; 2,630; 6.25%	Almaz Aladass; 875; 2.08%	Alex Neron; 298; 0.71%	Fernand Deschamps; 125; 0.30%	Ken Fernandez (CAP); 84 0.20%	Stéphane Dion
Saint-Laurent—Cartierville	Stéphane Dion; 28,107; 66.82%	William Fayad; 7,261; 17.26%	Marc Rahmé; 2,606; 6.20%	Zaid Mahayni; 2,630; 6.25%	Almaz Aladass; 875; 2.08%	Alex Neron; 298; 0.71%	Fernand Deschamps; 125; 0.30%	Nilda Vargas (Comm.); 78 0.19%	Stéphane Dion
Westmount—Ville-Marie	Lucienne Robillard; 22,337; 55.84%	Louis La Rochelle; 5,922; 14.81%	Robert Gervais; 4,027; 10.07%	Eric Wilson Steedman; 4,795; 11.99%	Brian Sarwer-Foner; 2,419; 6.05%	David John Proctor; 396; 0.99%	Serge Lachapelle; 103; 0.26%		Lucienne Robillard

==== Maps ====
1. Jeanne-Le Ber
2. Lac-Saint-Louis
3. LaSalle-Émard
4. Mount Royal
5. Notre-Dame-de-Grâce-Lachine
6. Outremont
7. Pierrefonds-Dollard
8. Saint-Laurent-Cartierville
9. Westmount-Ville-Marie
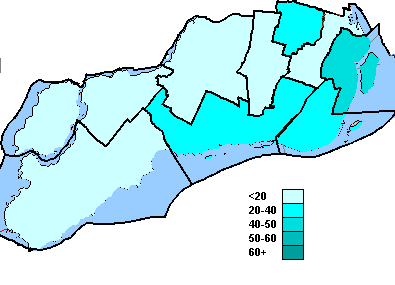
Bloc Québécois

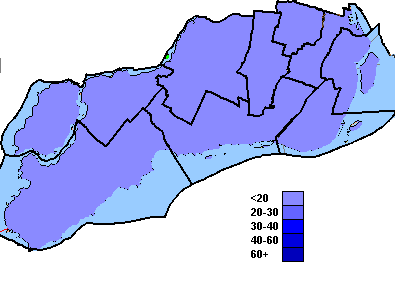
Conservative Party of Canada

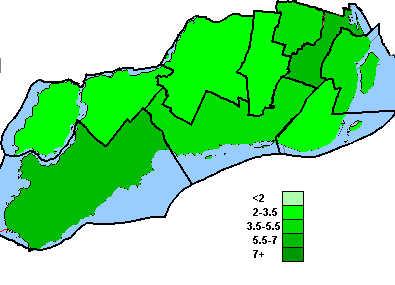
Green Party of Canada

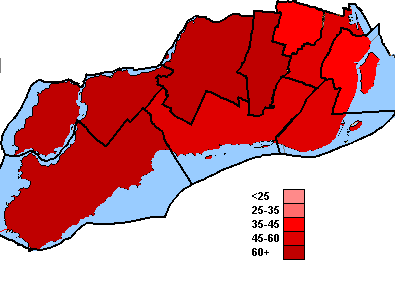
Liberal Party of Canada

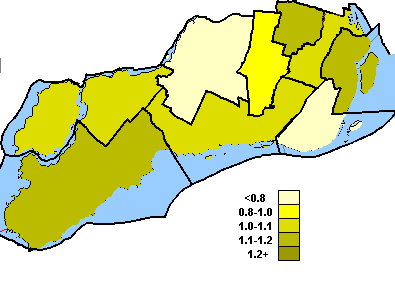
Marijuana Party of Canada

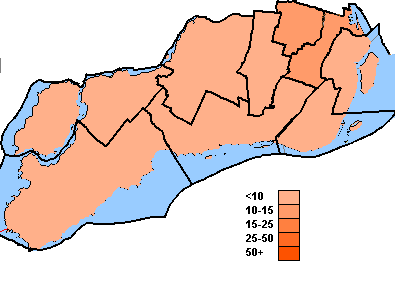
New Democratic Party

=== 2000 ===
Electoral district	Candidates								Incumbent
Electoral district	BQ	Liberal	Canadian Alliance	NDP	PC	Green	Marijuana	Other	Incumbent
Lac-Saint-Louis	Guy Amyot; 3,913; 6.67%	Clifford Lincoln; 43,515; 74.16%	William F. Shaw; 4,223; 7.20%	Erin Sikora; 1,464; 2.50%	Daniel Gendron; 4,411; 7.52%		Elena D'Apollonia; 1,031; 1.76%	Garnet Colly (M-L); 119; 0.20%	Clifford Lincoln
LaSalle—Émard	Denis Martel; 11,805; 24.20%	Paul Martin; 32,069; 65.75%	Giuseppe Joe De Santis; 1,806; 3.70%	David Bernans; 837; 1.72%	Deepak T. Massand; 1,111; 2.28%		Mathieux St-Cyr; 765; 1.57%	Gilles Bigras (NLP); 273 0.56% Irma Ortiz (Comm.); 107 0.22%	Paul Martin
Mount Royal	Jean-Sebastien Houle; 1,740; 4.27%	Irwin Cotler; 33,118; 81.24%	Alex Gabanski; 1,444; 3.54%	Maria Pia Chávez; 1,034; 2.54%	Stephane Gelgoot; 2,489; 6.11%	Jean-Claude Balu; 681; 1.67%		Judith Chafoya (Comm.); 140 0.34% Ena Kahn (NLP); 122 0.30%	Irwin Cotler
Notre-Dame-de-Grâce—Lachine	Jeannine Ouellet; 8,449; 18.11%	Marlene Jennings; 28,328; 60.72%	Darrin Etcovich; 2,022; 4.33%	Bruce Toombs; 2,208; 4.73%	Kathy Megyery; 3,352; 7.19%	Katie Graham; 1,031; 2.21%	Grégoire Faber; 897; 1.92%	Rachel Hoffman (M-L); 159 0.34% Michael Wilson (NLP); 205 0.44%	Marlene Jennings
Outremont	Amir Khadir; 11,151; 28.29%	Martin Cauchon; 18,796; 47.68%	Josée Duchesneau; 1,283; 3.25%	Peter Graefe; 2,199; 5.58%	Robert Archambault; 3,190; 8.09%	Jan Schotte; 1,478; 3.75%	Huguette Plourde; 1,013; 2.57%	Louise Charron (M-L); 194 0.49% Pierre Smith (Comm.); 118 0.30%	Martin Cauchon
Pierrefonds—Dollard	Sylvie Brousseau; 5,937; 10.99%	Bernard Patry; 39,357; 72.85%	Neil Drabkin; 3,481; 6.44%	Adam Hodgins; 1,109; 2.05%	John Profit; 2,991; 5.54%		Jean-François Labrecque; 1,149; 2.13%		Bernard Patry
Saint-Laurent—Cartierville	Yves Beauregard; 5,838; 13.07%	Stéphane Dion; 32,861; 73.58%	Kaddis R. Sidaros; 1,909; 4.27%	Piper Elizabeth Huggins; 1,070; 2.40%	J. Pierre Rouleau; 2,308; 5.17%			Jean-Paul Bedard (M-L); 234 0.52% Oscar Chavez (Comm.); 206 0.46% Ken Fernandez (CAP); 232 0.52%	Stéphane Dion
Verdun—Saint-Henri—Saint -Paul—Pointe Saint-Charles	Pedro Utillano; 11,976; 29.37%	Raymond Lavigne; 20,905; 51.27%	Jacques Gendron; 2,098; 5.15%	Matthew McLauchlin; 1,003; 2.46%	Bernard Côté; 2,670; 6.55%	Lorraine Ann Craig; 933; 2.29%	Marc-André Roy; 924; 2.27%	William Lorensen (NA); 117 0.29% Bill Sloan (Comm.); 148 0.36%	Raymond Lavigne; Verdun—Saint-Henri
Westmount—Ville-Marie	Marcela Valdivia; 4,110; 10.71%	Lucienne Robillard; 23,093; 60.19%	Felix Cotte; 1,697; 4.42%	Willy Blomme; 1,990; 5.19%	Bryan Price; 4,597; 11.98%	Brian Sarwer-Foner; 1,245; 3.25%	Patrice Caron; 692; 1.80%	Saroj Bains (M-L); 150 0.39% Allen Faguy (NLP); 96 0.25% Michel Laporte (NA); 694 1.81%	Lucienne Robillard

=== 1997 ===
==== Party rankings ====
Parties	1st	2nd	3rd	4th	5th
Liberal	9	0	0	0	0
Progressive Conservative	0	6	2	0	0
Bloc Québécois	0	2	6	0	0
New Democratic	0	0	0	6	2
Reform	0	0	0	2	2

==== Results by riding ====
Electoral district	Candidates							Incumbent
Electoral district	BQ	Liberal	Reform	NDP	PC	Natural Law	Other	Incumbent
Lac-Saint-Louis	Guy Amyot; 4,347	Clifford Lincoln; 42,613	William Bill Haines; 1,556	Chris Florence; 1,548	Nick Di Tomaso; 11,293	Ruby Finkelstein; 386		Clifford Lincoln; Lachine—Lac-Saint-Louis
LaSalle—Émard	Jean-Pierre Chalifoux; 12,953	Paul Martin; 32,317		Joe Bowman; 920	Josée Bélanger; 6,445	Russell Guest; 453		Paul Martin
Mount Royal	Jean-Sebastien Houle; 1,981	Sheila Finestone; 30,115		Adam Giambrone; 966	Carolyn Steinman; 5,006		Howard Galganov (Ind.); 10,090	Sheila Finestone
Notre-Dame-de-Grâce—Lachine	Jeannine Ouellet; 8,797	Marlene Jennings; 29,582		André Cardinal; 2,315	John V. Hachey; 10,350	Ronald Bessette; 569	Bryan Wolofsky (Ind.); 389; Caroline Polcsak (Ind.); 303	Warren Allmand; Notre-Dame-de-Grâce
Outremont	Michel Sarra-Bournet; 12,608	Martin Cauchon; 22,271		Tooker Gomberg; 2,862	Marguerite Sicard; 5,424	Denis Cauchon; 868	Louise Charron (M-L); 378	Martin Cauchon
Pierrefonds—Dollard	Normand Jean D'Ambrosio; 6,239	Bernard Patry; 38,476	Robert Laganière; 1,134	David Lyons; 1,060	Neil Drabkin; 10,546	Céline Chamard; 465		Bernard Patry
Saint-Laurent—Cartierville	Yves Beauregard; 6,276	Stéphane Dion; 34,598	Hagop Karlozian; 681	Jeff Itcush; 910	Jean-Martin Masse; 6,861			Stéphane Dion
Verdun—Saint-Henri	Donald Longuépée; 15,153	Raymond Lavigne; 21,424	Deepak Massand; 380	Claude Ledoux; 1,156	Aline Aubut; 6,838	Michèle Beausoleil; 498	Geneviève Royer(ML); 205	Raymond Lavigne; Verdun—Saint-Paul
Westmount—Ville-Marie	Bernard Guité; 5,078	Lucienne Robillard; 26,972		Chris Carter; 2,566	Tom Davis; 7,802	Allen Faguy; 212	Roopnarine Singh (Ind.); 1,328; Brian Sarwer-Foner (Green); 751; Normand Chouinard (M-L); 166	Lucienne Robillard; Saint-Henri—Westmount

=== 1993 ===
==== Seats won/lost by party ====
Party	1988	Gain from (loss to)				1993
Party	1988	PC		Lib.		1993
Liberal	5	+4	0	—		9
Progressive Conservative	4	—		0	–4	0

==== Party rankings ====
Parties	1st	2nd	3rd	4th
Liberal	9	0	0	0
Bloc Québécois	0	9	0	0
Progressive Conservative	0	0	9	0
New Democratic	0	0	0	9

==== Results by riding ====
Electoral district	Candidates								Incumbent
Electoral district	PC	Liberal	BQ	NDP	Natural Law	Commonwealth of Canada	Abolitionist	Other	Incumbent
Lachine—Lac-Saint-Louis	Nick Di Tomaso; 4,720	Clifford Lincoln; 39,714	Guy Amyot; 12,012	Val Udvarhely; 829	Ronald Bessette; 551	Claude Brosseau; 176	Michael Robinson; 85	William Shaw (Ind.); 612; Jim Wiebe (Libert.); 194	Robert Layton
LaSalle—Émard	Johanne Senécal; 2,368	Paul Martin; 30,866	Éric Cimon; 17,820	Richard Belzile; 708	George Amarica; 419	Giampaolo Carli; 120	Thérèse Turmel; 103		Paul Martin
Mount Royal	Neil Drabkin; 2,758	Sheila Finestone; 39,598	Guillaume Dumas; 3,324	Michael Richard Werbowski; 796	Ken Matthews; 312	Georges Duchesnay; 71	Marie Vienneau; 47	Harry Polansky (Ind.); 537; Kurtis Law (Nat.); 300	Sheila Finestone
Notre-Dame-de-Grâce	Maeve Quaid; 2,645	Warren Allmand; 29,582	Gilbert Ouellet; 5,811	Bruce Toombs; 1,407	Michael E. Wilson; 415	Alexander Shiroka; 38	Michael Windeyer; 86	Shirley Demaine (Nat.); 596; Don Donderi (Ind.); 540; Earl Wertheimer (Liber.); 197; John Philips (Ind.); 171	Warren Allmand
Outremont	Jean Pierre Hogue; 4,119	Martin Cauchon; 21,638	Jean-Louis Hérivault; 17,274	Catherine Kallos; 2,108	Daniel Bergeron; 694	Mamunor Rashid; 89	Sylvain M. Coulombe; 131	Michel Rocheleau (M-L); 179	Jean-Pierre Hogue
Pierrefonds—Dollard	Gerry Weiner; 8,106	Bernard Patry; 39,947	René de Cotret Opzoomer; 10,712	Catherine J. Rideout-Erais; 864	Ruby Finkelstein; 480	Glenford Charles; 108		Carlos Roldan (Nat.); 474; Hugh Rowe (Liber.); 410; Lionel Albert (Ind.); 386	Gerry Weiner
Saint-Laurent—Cartierville	Mark Weiner; 3,254	Shirley Maheu; 30,669	Amin Hachem; 8,231	Francine Poirier; 866	José Torres; 330	Monique Lanctôt; 229	Madelaine Piquette-Bedard; 103	Roopnarine Singh (Nat.); 274	Shirley Maheu; Saint-Laurent
Verdun—Saint-Paul	André Martin; 3,864	Raymond Lavigne; 19,644	Kim Beaudoin; 19,095	Claude Ledoux; 860	Marylise Baux; 432	Golam Khan; 88	Yvan Cousineau; 140	Jean-Marc Beaudin (Green); 598; J.J. McPherson (Nat.); 130; Deepak Massand (Ind.); 115	Gilbert Chartrand
Saint-Henri—Westmount	Alain Perez; 5,834	David Berger; 24,592	Eugenia Romain; 7,364	Ann Elbourne; 1,607	Allan Faguy; 535	Normand Bélanger; 126	Robert Carlisle; 76	Louise Pilon (Nat.); 565; Mark Edward Anderson Roper (Ind.); 245; Robert Adams (Her.); 121; Rudolph Scalzo (Ind.); 118; Arnold August (M.-L.); 105	David Berger

=== 1988 ===
==== Party rankings ====
Parties	1st	2nd	3rd
Liberal	5	4	0
Progressive Conservative	4	5	0
New Democratic	0	0	9

==== Results by riding ====
Electoral district	Candidates								Incumbent
Electoral district	PC	Liberal	NDP	Green	Libertarian	Commonwealth of Canada	Rhinoceros	Other	Incumbent
Lachine—Lac-Saint-Louis	Robert Layton; 25,870	Victor Drury; 25,136	Val Udvarhely; 4,518	Marilyn K. Paxton; 858	Neal Ford; 325	Catherine Fortier; 102		André Davignon (Ind.); 227	Robert Layton; Lachine
LaSalle—Émard	Claude Lanthier; 21,979	Paul Martin; 23,394	Jean-Claude Bohrer; 5,458			Nancy Guice; 117		Ginette Boutet (Ind); 305; Ginette Gauthier (Comm); 212	Claude Lanthier; Lasalle
Mount Royal	Robert Presser; 14,601	Sheila Finestone; 27,354	Tariq Alvi; 2,455	Daniel Reicher; 438		Paul G. Fraleigh; 108	Lady Be Ann Poulin; 512	Barry Goodman (Ind); 165; Abe Rosner (Ind); 68	Sheila Finestone
Notre-Dame-de-Grâce	Samir Chebeir; 11,702	Warren Allmand; 22,928	Maria Peluso; 5,154	Stephen A. Bruneau; 848	Earl Wertheimer; 223	Léon Plourde; 45	Al Feldman; 678	Robert Adams (CHP); 356; Margaret Frain (Ind); 80	Warren Allmand; Notre-Dame-de-Grâce—Lachine East
Outremont	Jean Pierre Hogue; 17,597	Lucie Pépin; 15,895	Louise O'Neill; 9,379	Harriett Fels; 1,342		Guy Huard; 117	Milenko P. Miljévic; 1,077	Monique Marcotte (Comm); 200; Fernand Deschamps (Ind); 183	Lucie Pépin
Pierrefonds—Dollard	Gerry Weiner; 27,532	Bernard Patry; 22,244	Pierre Razik; 3,854	Hugh Rowe; 302	Michel Haddad; 77		Jean-François Lafond; 856	William Short (Ind); 452	Gerry Weiner; Dollard
Saint-Laurent	Lyse Hubert-Bennett; 18,287	Shirley Maheu; 20,418	Sid Ingerman; 4,213	Alain Hickson; 765		Joakim Simon; 120		Michelle Dufort (Ind); 311	New district
Verdun—Saint-Paul	Gilbert Chartrand; 20,113	Raymond Lavigne; 15,207	Alain Tassé; 6,572	Jan-Marc Lavergne; 1,339		Claude Brosseau; 142	Irène Maman Mayer; 902	Yvon Turgeon (Ind); 105	Gilbert Chartrand
Saint-Henri—Westmount	Keith MacLellan; 15,673	David Berger; 16,600	Ruth Rose; 5,235	Brian McLoughlin; 900	Joyce Willert; 170		John McGill Jagiellowicz; 671	Frank Auf der Maur (Ind); 402; Pierre Chénier (Ind); 184; Richard H. Gaunt (Ind); 60	Don Johnston; Saint-Henri—Westmount
Saint-Henri—Westmount	Keith MacLellan; 15,673	David Berger; 16,600	Ruth Rose; 5,235	Brian McLoughlin; 900	Joyce Willert; 170		John McGill Jagiellowicz; 671	Frank Auf der Maur (Ind); 402; Pierre Chénier (Ind); 184; Richard H. Gaunt (Ind); 60	merged district
Saint-Henri—Westmount	Keith MacLellan; 15,673	David Berger; 16,600	Ruth Rose; 5,235	Brian McLoughlin; 900	Joyce Willert; 170		John McGill Jagiellowicz; 671	Frank Auf der Maur (Ind); 402; Pierre Chénier (Ind); 184; Richard H. Gaunt (Ind); 60	Jacques Guilbault; Saint-Jacques
