= Chief Scout's Award (Scouts Canada) =

Scouts Canada award

- Owner: Scouts Canada
- Country: Canada
- Founded: 1973
- Founder: Roland Michener

The Chief Scout's Award is the highest award which can be achieved at the Scout level in Scouts Canada. It was inaugurated in September 1973 by then Governor General of Canada Roland Michener, in his capacity as Chief Scout. The award was created to provide recognition for Scouts when the Scout program was divided into the Scout and Venturer sections. The former Queen's/Kings's Scout award was renamed as the Queen's Venturer Award, and is the highest award that can be achieved in the Scouting youth program in Canada. Speaking to the prestige of the award, at least one known Chief Scout has gone on to win a Nobel Prize, 4 have become Members of Parliament (currently one sitting MP Frank Baylis) and at least 1 has been a Premier. Others have become titans of industry, technology, academia, finance and media.

In order to earn the award a Scout must earn the Voyageur and Pathfinder Activity Awards which require the Scout to develop citizenship, leadership, personal development and outdoor skills, as well as earn ten Challenge badges, at least one in each of the seven categories (athletics, outdoors, home and family, personal development, science and technology, culture and society, and environment); they must in addition hold current qualifications in Standard First Aid, hold the World Scout Environment Badge, investigate and present findings on Scouts Canada's involvement in World Scouting, design a challenging programme which will require the Scout to excel in each of the four activity areas (Citizenship, Leadership, Personal Development, and Outdoor Skills), including at least 30 hours of additional leadership to others (above those required in the Citizenship Activity area of the Voyageur and Pathfinder awards).

In working towards the Chief Scout's Award, the Scout will have performed over 30 hours of service in the community, much of it self-directed. They have met with a local service agency and together have discussed and made plans for future improvements in the community. Additional work on the World Scout Environment Badge exposes a Chief Scout's Award candidate to the many environmental issues of today, and they have taken an active role in promoting those issues with the public. Chief Scout's Award candidates amass more than 100 kilometers in hiking camps and they spend time as trainers helping their fellow Scouts work on their own badge levels.

Scouts Canada has, in the past, proposed replacing the award with a membership to the Queen Elizabeth Jubilee Youth Ensemble after completion of the same requirements, but lacking the required signatures of 250 Chief Scout recipients, this has yet to be approved. The first recipients of the award were Kevin Stille and Ian Wiggs, both of Ottawa.

== See also ==
- Chief Scout's Award (Scouting Ireland)
- List of highest awards in Scouting
