= Gloria Baylis =

Barbadian-Canadian civil rights activist, registered nurse and entrepreneur (1929–2017)

Gloria Leon Baylis (née Clarke; June 29, 1929 – April 12, 2017) was a Barbadian Canadian civil rights activist, registered nurse and entrepreneur. She won the first-ever case of employment-related racial discrimination in Canada, and later founded the Baylis Medical Company, which was ranked in 2018 as one of Canada's best-managed companies.

== Early life and career ==
Gloria Leon Baylis was born to Antoinette Margaret Clarke and Reynold Leon Clarke in Bridgetown, Barbados on June 29, 1929. In 1948 she immigrated to England, where she trained in nursing and midwifery. She worked at the Kingston General Hospital from 1948 to 1951, and from 1951 to 1952 at the Chiswick Maternity Hospital and the Myddleton Square Nursing Association.

In 1952 Baylis relocated to Montreal, Quebec, where she met Richard Baylis; they were married on September 22, 1956, and together had five children. Their first-born child, Pia Maria, died shortly after birth (February 4, 1960 – March 16, 1960). Their four living children are bioethicist Francoise Baylis, former member of Parliament Frank Baylis, social worker and professor Peter John Baylis, and physician Penny Jane Baylis.

Baylis continued her nursing career in Montreal, first in private duty from 1953 to 1954, then at the Montreal General Hospital from 1954 to 1957, in which year she became the operating room instructor at the Hôtel-Dieu de Montréal. In 1958 she worked at the Jewish General Hospital, and in 1959 she was assistant supervisor at Reddy Memorial Hospital. In 1960 she returned to the Hôtel-Dieu Hospital, where she served until 1962 as instructor and head nurse in the operating room.

== Her Majesty the Queen v. Hilton of Canada., Ltd. ==
Baylis first garnered public attention in 1964 as the complainant in Canada's first employment-related racial discrimination case. The charge was based on new legislation concerning employment practices, introduced in Quebec in the form of An Act Respecting Discrimination in Employment on September 1, 1964. According to the Act, "any distinction, exclusion or preference made on the basis of race, colour, sex, religion, national extraction or social origin, which have the effect of nullifying or impairing the equality of opportunity or treatment in employment or occupation" constituted discrimination with respect to employment.

On September 2, 1964, one day after the Act came into effect, Baylis visited the Queen Elizabeth Hotel in Montreal (then operated by the Hilton chain) to inquire about a part-time nursing position. She was immediately informed that the position had been filled; however, when she called the personnel office the following day, she was told that the position in fact remained vacant and that the hotel was still accepting applications, which was confirmed by subsequent investigation. Realizing that this was a test case for the discrimination legislation, Baylis filed a complaint under the new Act, initiating the first case in Canada to allege employment-related discrimination based on race. As reported by her lawyer Gerald Charness, the presiding judge found that Baylis had been treated differently from all other applicants and that this justified her complaint of discrimination.

When Baylis won the case on October 4, 1965, it was the first time in Canadian history that an institution was found guilty of discrimination in employment based on race. For the next eleven years Hilton of Canada appealed, arguing that the legislation was unconstitutional. The original decision was upheld by the Cour d'appel du Québec (Court of Appeal of Quebec) on January 19, 1977.

The details of this case are chronicled by Karen Flynn in her article "'Hotel Refuses Negro Nurse': Gloria Clarke Baylis and the Queen Elizabeth Hotel" which was awarded the Canadian Historical Association's Hilda Neatby Prize in 2019.

== Later career ==
While her case was ongoing in 1964, Baylis obtained employment as a supervisor in the operating room suite of the Catherine Booth Hospital, where she remained until 1969. She also worked at the clinic of physician Henry Morgentaler while his work was still illegal. On June 1, 1970, Morgentaler was arrested and charged with two counts of conspiracy to perform abortions; Baylis was arrested with him, along with two other nurses and a secretary.

In 1970 Baylis moved her family to Toronto, where she did private duty work in intensive care and in the operating rooms of most of the city's major hospitals. Near the end of her nursing career, Baylis served as vice-president of the Board of Directors of the Central Registry of Graduate Nurses from 1983 to 1984. She also served as nurse on-set for two films, Mrs. Soffel (1984) and Youngblood (1986).

In addition to her nursing work, Baylis was involved in founding the Ontario Amateur Netball Association (now Netball Ontario) through which she worked to introduce the sport to young Ontarians. In 1985, in recognition of her work in promoting and developing the sport at both provincial and national levels, the government of Ontario honoured Baylis with the Special Achievement Award for Distinguished Contributions to the Field of Fitness and Amateur Sport.

== Baylis Medical Company ==
After her retirement from nursing, Baylis founded the Baylis Medical Company from her home office in 1983, incorporating in 1986. Beginning as an importer and distributor of medical devices for use in neurosurgery and cardiac electrophysiology (including the first neuro-interventional catheters imported to North America), Baylis turned to research, development and production in 2001. Since then, Baylis Medical Company has collaborated with hospitals to develop state-of-the-art specialized medical devices, and now employs more than 550 people. In recognition of her entrepreneurial accomplishments, Baylis was awarded the 1999 Jackie Robinson award for Business Person of the Year by the Montreal Association of Black Business Persons.

Baylis retired from Baylis Medical Company in 2004. She later suffered from Alzheimer's disease and died on April 12, 2017, in Westmount, Quebec. She was honoured with a poem by George Elliott Clarke, Canada's 7th Parliamentary Poet Laureate.
