= Valérie Assouline =

Canadian lawyer and politician

Valérie Assouline MNA

Member of the National Assembly for Saint-Laurent
- Incumbent
- Assumed office October 5, 2026
- Preceded by: Marwah Rizqy

Dollard-des-Ormeaux City Councillor for District 6
- In office 2017–2026
- Preceded by: Peter Prassas

Personal details
- Party: Liberal
- Education: Université de Montréal (LLB)

Valérie Assouline is a Canadian lawyer and politician who is a Member of the National Assembly of Quebec for Saint-Laurent.

== Legal career ==
Assouline was admitted to the Bar of Quebec in 1998.

Assouline represented the mother and grandmother of a 7-year-old girl from Granby, Quebec who was murdered by her stepmother in 2019 in a lawsuit against Quebec's department of youth protection, claiming that they failed to protect her from her stepmother's abuse.

Assouline was the 160th President of the Bar of Montreal (Bâtonnière of Montreal) from May 2025 to May 2026.

== Political career ==
In the 2014 Quebec general election, Assouline ran in the riding of Laurier-Dorion as a member of Coalition Avenir Quebec, coming in 4th-place with 7.2% of the votes.

In the 2015 Canadian federal election, she ran in the riding of Pierrefonds—Dollard as a member of the Conservative Party of Canada. She came in second with 20% of the votes, losing to Frank Baylis.

In 2017, Assouline was elected city councillor in Dollard-des-Ormeaux's 6th District, defeating incumbent Peter Prassas, and was re-elected in 2021 and 2025, the latter being by acclimation.

On August 26, 2026, she was selected by the Quebec Liberal Party to be their candidate for Saint-Laurent in the 2026 Quebec general election.

== Personal life ==
Assouline was born in Morocco into a Jewish household and moved to Quebec when she was four. She has four children. She is a Zionist and has expressed views against muslims and Palestine.

== Electoral record ==
2026 Quebec general election: Saint-Laurent
** Preliminary results — Not yet official **
Party	Candidate	Votes	%	±%
Liberal	Valérie Assouline	16,681	54.45	
Québec solidaire	Étienne Loiselle-Schiettekatte	5,067	16.54	
Conservative	Barry Rolbin	3,781	12.34	
Parti Québécois	Pierre-Étienne Nantel	2,570	8.39	
Coalition Avenir Québec	Tahmina Kabir	1,425	4.65	
Canadian	Audrey Baillairgé	544	1.78	
Green	Pierre-Christophe Dagher Falardeau	376	1.23	
Marxist–Leninist	Fernand Deschamps	114	0.37	
Independent	Joe Young	77	0.25	
Total valid votes				
Total rejected ballots				
Turnout			52.01	
Electors on the lists			–	–
Liberal hold		Swing		
Source: Élections Québec

2025 Dollard-des-Ormeaux municipal election: District 6
Candidate	Votes	%
Valérie Assouline (X)	Acclaimed	

2021 Dollard-des-Ormeaux municipal election: District 6
Candidate	Votes	%
Valérie Assouline (X)	579	42.95
Dereik Gregory	543	40.28
Deepak Awasti	226	16.77

2017 Dollard-des-Ormeaux municipal election: District 6
Candidate	Votes	%
Valérie Assouline	869	53.18
Peter Prassas (X)	765	46.82

2015 Canadian federal election: Pierrefonds—Dollard
Party	Candidate	Votes	%	±%	Expenditures
Liberal	Frank Baylis	34,319	58.7	+28.23	–
Conservative	Valérie Assouline	11,694	20.0	-6.86	–
New Democratic	Lysane Blanchette-Lamothe	9,584	16.4	-17.73	–
Bloc Québécois	Natalie Laplante	2,043	3.5	-1.48	–
Green	Abraham Weizfeld	865	1.5	-2.06	–
Total valid votes/Expense limit		58,505	100.0		$223,427.18
Total rejected ballots		368	–	–	
Turnout		58,873	69.28	–	
Eligible voters		84,978			
Liberal gain from New Democratic		Swing		+22.98	
Source: Elections Canada

2014 Quebec general election: Laurier-Dorion
Party	Candidate	Votes	%	±%
Liberal	Gerry Sklavounos	15,566	46.19	+12.11
Québec solidaire	Andrés Fontecilla	9,330	27.69	+3.36
Parti Québécois	Pierre Céré	5,369	15.93	-10.51
Coalition Avenir Québec	Valérie Assouline	2,431	7.21	-2.57
Green	Jeremy Tessier	482	1.43	-0.06
Option nationale	Miguel Tremblay	263	0.78	-2.05
Bloc Pot	Hugô St-Onge	143	0.42	–
Marxist–Leninist	Peter Macrisopoulos	116	0.34	+0.03
Total valid votes		33,700	98.74	–
Total rejected ballots		429	1.26	–
Turnout		34,129	72.60	+2.39
Electors on the lists		47,011	–	–
