= Scouts (Scouts Canada) =

The Scout section of Scouts Canada is for boys and girls ages 11 to 14 (optional to 16). The program offers two main types of badges, Challenge Badges and Activity badges. The Challenge badges are round whereas the Activity badges are square or diamond-shaped. The Activity badges have two levels indicated by the border colour and shape: red and square-shaped for Voyageur and green and diamond-shaped for Pathfinder. Activity badges are required to achieve 3 out of the 4 awards, the Voyageur Scout Award, the Pathfinder Scout Award and the Chief Scout's Award, the fourth being the World Scout Environment Award.

== Activity badges ==
- Citizenship
- Leadership
- Personal Development
- Outdoor Skills

Obtaining all 4 of the red border Activity badges, 4 challenge badges and the Spring/Fall Year-Round Camper award entitles one to the Voyager Scout Award. Obtaining all 4 of the green border Activity badges, 6 more challenge badges and the Summer and Winter Year-Round Camper awards entitles one to the Pathfinder Scout Award. Obtaining the Pathfinder Scout Award is one step to the Chief Scout's Award.

== Badges ==
=== Chief Scout's Award ===
To obtain the Chief Scout's Award, the highest rank in Scouts Canada at the Scout level, one must earn the Pathfinder Scout Award, the Standard First Aid Award (St. John Ambulance or Red Cross), at least one Challenge badge from each category, the World Scout Environment Award, do a presentation about the World Scouting Movement and make a challenging program for each of the 4 categories (Citizenship, Leadership, Outdoor Skills and Personal Development). The Citizenship program must require 30 hours of leadership to others. After these 6 steps, you are eligible for the Chief Scout's Award.

=== World Scout Environment Award ===
This award is designed to demonstrate a Scout's concern for, and active stewardship of, the environment. The badge shows Antarctica - the only collectively managed continent in the world and one of the most at risk from climate change - at its center. The other land-forms create a world image inside a green border. In order to earn it, the Scout must complete the Climate Change and Emergency Preparedness Challenge badges, do at least 2 of the following badges (Fish and Wildlife, Soil and Water Management, Forestry), make a presentation about how their community is addressing climate change, research a local environment issue and do an 8-hour environmental project with their troop.

=== Challenge badges ===
Challenge badges are worn on the right sleeve. There are 51 of them. The requirements are typically done alone, instead of with groups.

==== Athletics ====
- Individual Sport-Demonstrate ability in an individual sport approved by your troop.
- Team Sport-Demonstrate your ability in any suitable or appropriate team sport that is approved by your troop.
- Winter Sport-Demonstrate your ability in any suitable or appropriate winter sport that is approved by your troop.
- Swimming-Demonstrate an ability to swim.
- Water Sport-Demonstrate your ability in any water sport approved by your troop.

==== Culture and Society ====
- Artist-To recognize an interest and participation in art.
- Literary Arts-To recognize participation in literary arts.
- Photography-To recognize knowledge and skills in photography or videography.
- Cultural Awareness-To gain a greater understanding of Canada's cultural diversity.
- Modeller-To recognize interest and ability in constructing models or toys.
- Special Needs Awareness-To gain a greater awareness of special needs requirements.
- Handicraft-to recognize skill in some form of handicraft.
- Music-To recognize musical ability.
- Heritage-To explore a Scout's heritage.
- Performing Arts-To recognize participation in a performing art.

==== Environment ====
- Agriculture-Demonstrate your knowledge and involvement in an agricultural project.
- Horticulture-Demonstrate your knowledge and involvement in a horticultural project.
- Soil and Water Management-Demonstrate your knowledge and involvement in soil and water management.
- Fish and Wildlife-Demonstrate your knowledge and involvement in fish and wildlife management.
- Naturalist-Demonstrate your knowledge and skill in the field of natural science, emphasizing outdoor activity.
- Climate Change-Demonstrate your knowledge and involvement in climate change.
- Forestry-Demonstrate your knowledge and involvement in forest management.
- Recycling-Demonstrate your knowledge and involvement in recycling.

==== Home and Family ====
- Builder-Show an interest in building objects.
- Family Care-Show an interest in personal responsibility for your family.
- Safety-Demonstrate a knowledge for safety.
- Cooking-Show an interest in planning and cooking meals.
- Home Repair-Demonstrate the ability to make home repairs.
- Emergency Preparedness-Demonstrate knowledge of how to prepare for an emergency.
- Pet Care-Show an interest and ability in maintaining a healthy pet

==== Outdoors ====
- Pioneering-This badge recognizes the ability of a Scout in the area of Pioneering. The ability goes beyond a basic knowledge of knots and lashing, to the point that the Scout can create useful and creative items using easily obtained wooden poles and rope (including cord and string).
- Powercraft-To encourage Scouts to practice the safe operation of a powercraft, and be able to demonstrate basic maintenance.
- White Water-Teach the safe and responsible handling of a canoe, kayak, or similar craft in moving water.
- Advanced Tripping-Demonstrate extended lightweight camping skills while adhering to Leave No Trace philosophies.
- Sailing-This badge covers sailboats, dinghies and keelboats.
- Winter Scouting-Demonstrate in the winter an ability to hike and camp in the outdoors adhering to Leave No Trace philosophies.
- Exploring-Scouts should explore an unfamiliar area.
- Water Tripping-Experience all aspects of extended water trips.
- Paddling-Demonstrate the skills and knowledge to safely handle a canoe, kayak or similar craft on flat or slow moving water.
- Weather-To develop an interest in, and skills about, weather information.

==== Personal Development ====
- Collector-Show an interest in putting a collection together.
- Individual Specialty-To provide a way to recognize a Scout who has a special interest.
- Troop Specialty-To provide a way to recognize a troop that has a special interest.
- Communicator-Demonstrate formal communication skills.
- Language Strip-Demonstrate an ability to speak in another language.
- First Aid-Demonstrate a knowledge of first aid procedures.
- Lifesaving-To demonstrate knowledge of lifesaving techniques with various types of victims.

==== Science and Technology ====
- Computer-To Recognize knowledge and skills with personal computing devices.
- Science-Show an interest in the sciences. Some scientific fields include: archaeology, astronomy, biology, chemistry, electronics, geology, mathematics, medicine, physics, zoology, microbiology, botany, and biotechnology.
- Engineering-Explore the fields of engineering. Some engineering fields include: aeronautical, aerospace, architectural, civil, computer, electrical, marine, mechanical, meteorological and mining.
- Space Exploration-To encourage youth to investigate the area of space exploration.
