= Notre-Dame-de-Grâce—Lachine =

Former federal electoral district in Quebec, Canada

Coordinates: 45.4436°N 73.6481°W

Quebec electoral district
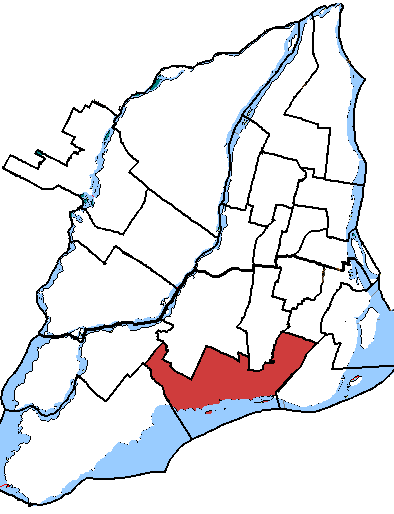
- Notre-Dame-de-Grâce—Lachine in relation to other federal electoral districts in Montreal
- District created: 1996
- District abolished: 2012
- First contested: 1997
- Last contested: 2011
- District webpage: profile, map

Demographics
- Population (2011): 105,306
- Electors (2011): 76,119
- Area (km²): 47.03
- Census division: Montreal
- Census subdivision(s): Dorval, Montreal West, Lachine, Notre-Dame-de-Grâce

Notre-Dame-de-Grâce—Lachine (French pronunciation: [nɔtʁə dam də ɡʁɑs laʃin]; formerly known as Lachine—Notre-Dame-de-Grâce) was a federal electoral district in Quebec, Canada, that was represented in the House of Commons of Canada from 1997 to 2015. Its population in 2006 was 104,715.

== Geography ==
The district included the cities of Dorval and Montreal West, the borough of Lachine and the part of the neighbourhood of Notre-Dame-de-Grâce west of Hingston Avenue in the City of Montreal. The neighbouring ridings were Mount Royal, Westmount—Ville-Marie, LaSalle—Émard, Châteauguay—Saint-Constant, Lac-Saint-Louis, Pierrefonds—Dollard, and Saint-Laurent—Cartierville.

=== Political geography ===
The Liberals had their strongest support in NDG, but also had a lot of support in most of Lachine and Dorval. The Conservatives failed to win any polls, but were the strongest in Lachine and Dorval. The Bloc, despite finishing third in 2008, was very strong in eastern Lachine including Ville Saint-Pierre. The riding was won by the NDP in its 2011 sweep of the province.

== History ==
The electoral district of "Lachine—Notre-Dame-de-Grâce" was created in 1996 from parts of Lachine—Lac-Saint-Louis and Notre-Dame-de-Grâce ridings. The name was changed to Notre-Dame-de-Grâce—Lachine in 1997 before the 1997 election was held.

=== Member of Parliament ===
This riding has elected the following members of Parliament:

Parliament	Years	Member	Party
Notre-Dame-de-Grâce—Lachine; Riding created from Lachine—Lac-Saint-Louis and Notre-Dame-de-Grâce
36th	1997–2000	Marlene Jennings	Liberal
37th	2000–2004	Marlene Jennings	Liberal
38th	2004–2006	Marlene Jennings	Liberal
39th	2006–2008	Marlene Jennings	Liberal
40th	2008–2011	Marlene Jennings	Liberal
41st	2011–2015	Isabelle Morin	New Democratic
Riding dissolved into Dorval—Lachine—LaSalle, and Notre-Dame-de-Grâce—Westmount

== Election results ==
2011 Canadian federal election
Party	Candidate	Votes	%	±%	Expenditures
New Democratic	Isabelle Morin	17,943	39.73	+24.57	
Liberal	Marlene Jennings	14,407	31.90	-12.72	
Conservative	Matthew Conway	6,574	14.56	-1.66	
Bloc Québécois	Gabrielle Ladouceur-Despins	3,983	8.82	-7.07	
Green	Jessica Gal	1,914	4.24	-3.47	
Independent	David Andrew Lovett	207	0.46	–	
Marxist–Leninist	Rachel Hoffman	131	0.29	-0.11	
Total valid votes		45,159	100.00		
Total rejected ballots		464	1.02	+0.12	
Turnout		45,623	58.61		
Eligible voters		77,848	–	–	

2008 Canadian federal election
Party	Candidate	Votes	%	±%	Expenditures
Liberal	Marlene Jennings	19,554	44.62	+0.77	$43,963
Conservative	Carmine Pontillo	7,108	16.22	-1.22	$45,991
Bloc Québécois	Éric Taillefer	6,962	15.89	-4.45	$7,443
New Democratic	Peter Deslauriers	6,641	15.16	+3.34	$50,302
Green	Jessica Gal	3,378	7.71	+1.74	$959
Marxist–Leninist	Rachel Hoffman	177	0.40	+0.14	
Total valid votes/expense limit		43,820	100.00	$83,411	
Total rejected ballots		396	0.90		
Turnout		44,216			
Liberal hold		Swing	+1.0		

2006 Canadian federal election
Party	Candidate	Votes	%	±%	Expenditures
Liberal	Marlene Jennings	20,235	43.85	-9.35	$64,145
Bloc Québécois	Alexandre Lambert	9,385	20.34	-1.65	$15,822
Conservative	Allen F. MacKenzie	8,048	17.44	+7.22	$29,196
New Democratic	Peter Deslauriers	5,455	11.82	+3.89	$19,445
Green	Pierre-Albert Sévigny	2,754	5.97	+0.97	$1,065
Libertarian	Earl Wertheimer	152	0.33	-0.04	
Marxist–Leninist	Rachel Hoffman	118	0.26	+0.06	
Total valid votes/expense limit		46,147	100.00	$78,444	
Liberal hold		Swing	-3.85		

2004 Canadian federal election
Party	Candidate	Votes	%	±%	Expenditures
Liberal	Marlene Jennings	23,552	53.20	-7.53	$63,389
Bloc Québécois	Jean-Philippe Chartre	9,736	21.99	+3.88	$9,950
Conservative	William R McCullock	4,526	10.22	-1.30	$19,959
New Democratic	Maria Pia Chávez	3,513	7.93	+3.20	$6,040
Green	Jessica Gal	2,214	5.00	+2.79	$1,069
Marijuana	Jay Dell	479	1.08	-0.84	
Libertarian	Earl Wertheimer	165	0.37	–	
Marxist–Leninist	Rachel Hoffman	88	0.20	-0.14	
Total valid votes/expense limit		44,273	100.00	$78,500	

Note: Conservative vote is compared to the total of the Canadian Alliance vote and Progressive Conservative vote in 2000 election.

2000 Canadian federal election
Party	Candidate	Votes	%	±%
Liberal	Marlene Jennings	28,328	60.72	+4.17
Bloc Québécois	Jeannine Ouellet	8,449	18.11	+1.29
Progressive Conservative	Kathy Megyery	3,352	7.19	-12.60
New Democratic	Bruce Toombs	2,208	4.73	+0.31
Alliance	Darrin Etcovitch	2,022	4.33	
Green	Katie Graham	1,031	2.21	
Marijuana	Grégoire Faber	897	1.92	
Natural Law	Michael Wilson	205	0.44	-0.65
Marxist–Leninist	Rachel Hoffman	159	0.34	
Total valid votes		46,651	98.50	
Total rejected ballots		710	1.50	-0.47
Turnout		47,361	62.60	-15.13
Eligible voters		75,657	–	–
Liberal hold		Swing		+1.44
Sources: Official Results, Elections Canada, Official Voting Results

1997 Canadian federal election
Party	Candidate	Votes	%
Liberal	Marlene Jennings	29,582	56.56
Progressive Conservative	John V. Hachey	10,350	19.79
Bloc Québécois	Geneviève Dumont-Frenette	8,797	16.82
New Democratic	André Cardinal	2,315	4.43
Natural Law	Ronald Bessette	569	1.09
Independent	Bryan Wolofsky	389	0.74
Independent	Caroline Polcsak	303	0.58
Total valid votes		52,305	98.03
Total rejected ballots		1,053	1.97
Turnout		53,358	77.73
Eligible voters		68,644	–
Sources: Official Results, Elections Canada, Official Voting Results

== See also ==
- List of Canadian electoral districts
- Historical federal electoral districts of Canada
