= Lysane Blanchette-Lamothe =

Canadian politician (born 1984)

Shadow Minister for Immigration
- In office August 13, 2013 – November 19, 2015
- Leader: Thomas Mulcair
- Preceded by: Jinny Sims
- Succeeded by: Michelle Rempel

Member of Parliament for Pierrefonds—Dollard
- In office May 30, 2011 – October 19, 2015
- Preceded by: Bernard Patry
- Succeeded by: Frank Baylis

Chair of the Standing Committee on Status of Women
- In office 30 April 2013 – 28 October 2013
- Minister: Rona Ambrose; Kellie Leitch
- Preceded by: Marie-Claude Morin
- Succeeded by: Hélène LeBlanc

Personal details
- Born: April 7, 1984 (age 42) Montreal, Quebec, Canada
- Party: New Democratic Party
- Spouse: Ronald Rojas Alvarez (2013-present)
- Profession: Community Organizer, Student

Lysane Blanchette-Lamothe (born April 7, 1984) is a Canadian politician. She was elected Member of Parliament for the riding of Pierrefonds—Dollard in the 2011 Canadian federal election as a member of the New Democratic Party, defeating longtime Liberal MP Bernard Patry.

Born in Montreal, Quebec, she has a teaching diploma from the Université du Québec à Trois-Rivières in Special Education and is currently pursuing her master's degree in education at Université du Québec à Trois-Rivières. She has worked as a teacher in the Montreal area and in an Inuit school in northern Quebec.

She has lived in her riding for most of her life, and has been active in community work. She has worked with organizations alleviating poverty, and has taken part in events such as the Marche des femmes and demonstrations against high tuition.

Lysane was defeated in the 2015 election by Liberal Frank Baylis.

== Electoral record ==
2015 Canadian federal election: Pierrefonds—Dollard
Party	Candidate	Votes	%	±%	Expenditures
Liberal	Frank Baylis	34,319	58.66	+28.19	–
Conservative	Valérie Assouline	11,694	19.99	-6.87	–
New Democratic	Lysane Blanchette-Lamothe	9,584	16.38	-17.75	–
Bloc Québécois	Natalie Laplante	2,043	3.49	-1.49	–
Green	Abraham Weizfeld	865	1.48	-2.08	–
Total valid votes/Expense limit		58,505	100.0		$223,427.18
Total rejected ballots		368	–	–	
Turnout		58,873	–	–	
Eligible voters		84,978			
Source: Elections Canada

2011 Canadian federal election
Party	Candidate	Votes	%	±%
New Democratic	Lysane Blanchette-Lamothe	16,390	34.2%	–
Liberal	Bernard Patry	14,530	30.3%	–
Conservative	Agop Evereklian	12,901	26.9%	–
Bloc Québécois	Nicolas Jolicoeur	2,389	5.0%	–
Green	Jonathan Lumer	1,710	3.6%	–
Total valid votes		47,920	58.7%	

Source: Elections Canada
