= Frank Baylis =

Canadian politician and businessman

- Baylis in 2016

Member of Parliament for Pierrefonds—Dollard
- In office October 19, 2015 – September 11, 2019
- Preceded by: Lysane Blanchette-Lamothe
- Succeeded by: Sameer Zuberi

Personal details
- Born: November 15, 1962 (age 63) Montreal, Quebec, Canada
- Party: Liberal
- Parent: Gloria Baylis (mother)
- Relatives: Françoise Baylis (sister)
- Education: University of Waterloo
- Occupation: Politician; businessman
- Website: www.frankbaylis.ca

Frank Headley Baylis (born November 15, 1962) is a Canadian businessman and politician, who was elected to represent the riding of Pierrefonds-Dollard in the House of Commons of Canada in the 2015 federal election. He did not run for re-election in 2019. In January 2025, he announced his candidacy for leader of the Liberal Party of Canada. Baylis placed fourth in the election, getting 3% of the vote.

Baylis is the Executive Chairman of the Board of Directors of Baylis Medical Technologies, a medical equipment conception, design, development, production and distribution firm.

== Early life and education ==
Frank Baylis' father, Richard Baylis, immigrated to Canada from the United Kingdom in 1956, and his mother, Gloria Baylis (née Clarke), originally from Barbados, immigrated to Canada in 1952. Frank Baylis has three siblings, Dr. Françoise Baylis, Dr. Peter Baylis, and Dr. Penny Baylis. While originally from the Greater Montreal area, Baylis spent part of his youth living in Toronto before attending university. In Toronto, Baylis attended École secondaire Étienne-Brûlé. Baylis holds a bachelor's degree in electrical engineering from the University of Waterloo. He graduated in 1986 with honours.

During the Fall 2026 convocation, he received an honorary Doctor of Engineering degree from the University of Waterloo.

== Business career ==
Before being elected to the House of Commons, Frank Baylis was involved in the business of industrial manufacturing and consulting industry. In more recent years, Baylis has also been involved in the entertainment industry.

=== Baylis Medical Company Inc. ===
Frank Baylis' mother, Gloria Baylis, a nurse by profession, founded Baylis Medical Company in the early 1980s, running the business out of the family home. In 1986 Baylis Medical was incorporated as an importer and distributor of medical devices. Frank Baylis joined the company in 1989 to assist with distribution, and served as its president from 1989 to 2015.

From 1990 onwards, the company evolved from a distributor to a developer, manufacturer, and seller of proprietary medical devices with a focus on interventional cardiology and pain management. In 2009, Baylis Medical divested its pain management business to Kimberley-Clark Corporation. At the end of 2015, Baylis Medical divested its OsteoCool™ RF Ablation System and associated intellectual property to Medtronic. After the sale, Baylis Medical partnered with Medtronic to innovate the system further, and manufactured the OsteoCool™ (now under contract to Medtronic) at its Mississauga Ontario plant.

In the spring of 2020 during the COVID-19 pandemic, Ventilators for Canadians (V4C), a consortium of Canadian entrepreneurs, posted plans to develop and manufacture "urgently needed ventilators for hospitals across Canada." FTI Professional Grade Inc. was enlisted as the prime contractor to the federal government, "with Baylis Medical engaged as manufacturing subcontractor and V4C supporting the supply chain and manufacturing process". Scrutiny by the media and opposition parties within the Canadian Federal Government raised questions about conflict of interest in granting the contract to a consortium that subcontracted much of the work involved to a company co-owned by a former member of parliament. On November 27, 2020, the case was discussed by the House of Commons of Canada Standing Committee on Access to Information, Privacy and Ethics, and the Conflict of Interest and Ethics Commissioner found that: "As a former member of Parliament, [Mr. Baylis] is no longer subject to the Conflict of Interest Code for Members of the House of Commons" and that "the contract was not concluded with him." Under Canadian federal law, a "5-year prohibition on lobbying applies to former designated public office holders" [defined in the Lobbying Act, subsection 2(1). On December 4, 2020, Frank Baylis appeared before the same Standing Committee and testified that he had not spoken with the Prime Minister or any cabinet ministers or any members of any political party to "ask them or influence them for a contract".

In October 2021, Baylis Medical agreed to the sale of its cardiovascular medical devices business to Boston Scientific Corporation for US$1.75 billion. The acquisition was completed in February 2022. Concerning the sale, The Globe and Mail reported that "Mr. Baylis, the company's executive chairman, and Kris Shah, its president, co-own the debt-free enterprise, which has never raised outside equity. It's the third time their Montreal-based business has sold a division to a major U.S. company, making them arguably Canada's most successful medical device entrepreneurs."

All told, under Baylis' co-leadership (president, 1989–2015; executive chairman, 2015-2022) with partner and former classmate Kris Shah (president, 2015-2022), Baylis Medical has grown to an estimated 874 employees with offices in Montreal, Toronto, Boston, London (UK) and Munich. As of 2023, Baylis Medical Company's annual revenue was estimated at $219.4M USD.

Baylis Medical's affiliate spinoff company, Baylis Medical Technologies, is based in Mississauga, Ontario and focused on interventional radiology and neurology. It remains a separate entity and was not part of the transaction with Boston Scientific. Frank Baylis is currently the executive chairman of the board of directors at Baylis Med Tech.

=== OME Group Inc. ===
In 1991, Frank Baylis co-founded the OME Group along with Kris Shah. OME Group was a specialized consulting company that provided scientific research and experimental development tax consulting services to businesses across Canada. As the Vice President of OME Group, Baylis oversaw all business activities in the Montreal office from 1991 to 2011. OME Group was sold to Ernst and Young in 2011.

=== Righteous Films ===
Since 2007 Baylis has been a producer with Righteous Films (previously named: The Walk of Fame Entertainment), a video production house "whose mission is to develop and produce entertaining social or environmental films, which will also allow us to discover other cultures or characters from diverse backgrounds." Baylis is credited as a writer, co-producer and actor in the Righteous Pictures "Indy" film, Transit (2008) and also as a writer and executive producer of Generation Wolf (2016). More recently he is the executive producer of Undocumented (Sin papeles), another Righteous Pictures feature film (drama-social) in post-production (as of 2023). It tells the story of an undocumented activist from Mexico who finds that living conditions in America for persons like him are worse than those he fled from back home. The film won the PEOPLE'S CHOICE AWARDS for best "Featured Narrative Film" at the Seattle Latino Film Festival in 2023. In May 2024, Righteous Films with Baylis as an associate producer released a documentary that streamed on CBC Gem called My Friend Omar: The Battle of a Seasonal Worker.

== Political career ==
On November 18, 2014, Frank Baylis won the nomination race for the Liberal Party of Canada in the riding of Pierrefonds—Dollard in Quebec.

On October 19, 2015, Baylis won the electoral riding of Pierrefonds-Dollard with 58.7% of the vote. After the election, Baylis joined the Canadian House of Commons Standing Committee on Industry, Science and Technology. Baylis was also the Chair of the Canada—United-Kingdom Inter-Parliamentary Association. He declined to run for re-election in the 2019 Canadian federal election and was succeeded by Sameer Zuberi. He returned to his business career after leaving office.

Baylis was a candidate in the 2025 Liberal Party of Canada leadership election, upon the resignation of Prime Minister Justin Trudeau. He received just under 3% of the vote, placing fourth and last behind winner Mark Carney, runner-up Chrystia Freeland, and Karina Gould, with Carney winning every riding in the country. Despite finishing last, Baylis put up the best single-riding performance of any non-Carney candidate in his old riding of Pierrefonds—Dollard. He did not seek a seat in the 2025 Canadian federal election.

== Personal life ==
Baylis currently lives in the West Island of Montreal; he is married with three children.

== Electoral record ==
2015 Canadian federal election: Pierrefonds—Dollard
Party	Candidate	Votes	%	±%	Expenditures
Liberal	Frank Baylis	34,319	58.7	+28.23	–
Conservative	Valérie Assouline	11,694	20.0	-6.86	–
New Democratic	Lysane Blanchette-Lamothe	9,584	16.4	-17.73	–
Bloc Québécois	Natalie Laplante	2,043	3.5	-1.48	–
Green	Abraham Weizfeld	865	1.5	-2.06	–
Total valid votes/Expense limit		58,505	100.0		$223,427.18
Total rejected ballots		368	–	–	
Turnout		58,873	69.28	–	
Eligible voters		84,978			
Liberal gain from New Democratic		Swing		+22.98	
Source: Elections Canada

2025 Liberal Party of Canada leadership election
Candidate	First ballot			
Candidate	Votes	%	Points	%
Mark Carney	131,674	86.84	29,456.91	85.88
Chrystia Freeland	11,134	7.34	2,728.57	7.96
Karina Gould	4,785	3.16	1,100.34	3.21
Frank Baylis	4,038	2.66	1,014.18	2.96
Total valid votes	151,899	100.00	34,300.00	100.00
Turnout	151,899	92.71		
Eligible voters	163,836			
Source: Liberal Party

== Awards and honours ==
Over the years, Frank Baylis has received various awards and honours for both his business success and his charitable work.

- In 2024, Baylis was awarded The Harry Jerome Award for business. The awards showcase, recognize, and honour excellence within the African-Canadian community, acknowledging African-Canadian professionals who have had a widespread, positive effect on Canadian society.
- In 2022 Baylis was a finalist in the Bloom Burton Awards. The awards are bestowed annually to honour "an individual who made the greatest contribution to Canada's innovative healthcare industry in the previous year."
- In 2022, Baylis Medical in conjunction with Boston Scientific was a nominee for the Best Medical Technology category of the Prix Galien USA Awards for the VersaCross Transseptal Platform. The Prix Galien was created by French journalist and pharmacist Roland Mehl in honour of Galen (French: «Galien»), an ancient Greek physician, surgeon and philosopher considered to be one of the most "accomplished of all medical researchers of antiquity". According to the Galien Foundation, "the Prix Galien USA Awards recognize excellence in biopharmaceutical research [and] development that have significantly improved the human condition."
- In 2022 Baylis received an Alpha 2022 Business Personalities award from the Saint Laurent • Mont Royal Chambre de Commerce et d'Industrie.
- In 2014, Baylis (along with his business partner Kris Shah) received the Faculty of Engineering Team Alumni Achievement Medal, "in recognition of their significant contributions to the medical technology industry in Canada that have improved the lives of patients globally."
- In 2012, Baylis' community involvement and commitment to service earned him the Queen Elizabeth II Diamond Jubilee Medal from the Governor General of Canada David Johnston, in 2012.
- In 2011, Baylis (again with his partner Kris Shah) received the Entrepreneur of the Year Award in health services for Quebec from Ernst and Young.
- In his youth, Baylis received the Chief Scout's Award (Scouts Canada). The Chief Scout's Award is the highest award given out by Scouts Canada. It recognizes achievements in outdoor skills, leadership, and community service.
