= Marlene Jennings =

Canadian politician (born 1951)

The Honourable Marlene Jennings PC
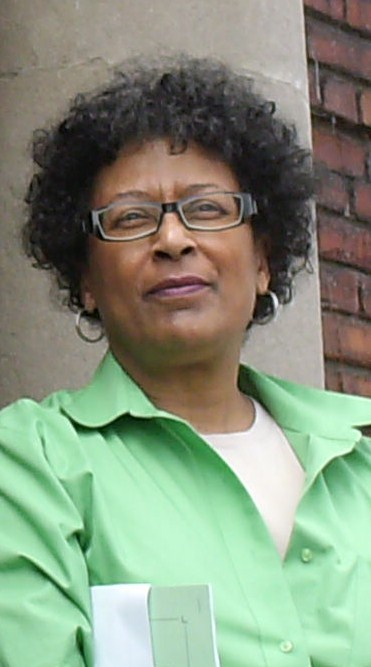

Member of Parliament for Notre-Dame-de-Grâce—Lachine
- In office June 2, 1997 – May 2, 2011
- Preceded by: Warren Allmand
- Succeeded by: Isabelle Morin

Personal details
- Born: November 10, 1951 (age 74) Longueuil, Quebec, Canada
- Party: Liberal
- Spouse: Luciano Del Negro
- Profession: Non-profit executive

Marlene Jennings PC (born November 10, 1951) is a former Canadian politician. She was a member of the Liberal Party of Canada in the House of Commons of Canada, and represented the riding of Notre-Dame-de-Grâce—Lachine from 1997 to 2011.

Jennings is a former lawyer and senior public servant. She is the former Parliamentary Secretary to the Minister for International Cooperation and the former Parliamentary Secretary to the Solicitor General of Canada. From 2004 to October 2005, she was Parliamentary Secretary to the Prime Minister with special emphasis on Canada-U.S. relations.

Jennings was the first Black woman from Quebec to be elected to Parliament. She was also one of the few parliamentarians with a physical disability, having become partially blind due to an illness in early 2010; she used visual aids and a white cane until late 2011. Over seven surgical procedures successfully restored her vision.

She is also a past member of the Girl Guides of Canada.

== Early life ==
Jennings was born in Longueuil, Quebec and graduated from Longueuil's Lemoyne d'Iberville High School. Her father, Preston Jennings, was an African American from Alabama and immigrated to Canada as a CPR Sleeping Car Porter. Her mother, Gilberte Garand, was a Franco-Manitoban of Belgian and French-Canadian ancestry.

== Electoral history ==
Jennings succeeded Warren Allmand, the MP for Notre-Dame-de-Grâce, in the reorganized riding of Notre-Dame-de-Grâce—Lachine upon its creation in 1997. She was elected five times in the riding with consistent margins of between 10,000 and 20,000 votes, and her riding was considered one of the safest Liberal seats in the country. However, she fell to Quebec's "orange wave" in the 2011 Canadian federal election, losing her seat to Isabelle Morin of the NDP.

== Later life and career ==
In January 2012, it was reported that Jennings was considering an offer to run for the Coalition Avenir Québec in the 2012 Quebec general election. She ultimately declined. In a February 2012 Facebook post, Jennings explained that she had declined because she had never had a "passion" for provincial politics. For close to two years (2012 and 2013) she was the executive director of the Montreal YMHA. She had let her Liberal Party of Canada party membership lapse but re-joined in 2014.

2011 Canadian federal election
Party	Candidate	Votes	%	±%	Expenditures
New Democratic	Isabelle Morin	17,943	39.73%	+24.57%	
Liberal	Marlene Jennings	14,407	31.90%	-12.72%	
Conservative	Matthew Conway	6,574	14.56%	-1.66%	
Bloc Québécois	Gabrielle Ladouceur-Despins	3,983	8.82%	-7.07%	
Green	Jessica Gal	1,914	4.24%	-3.47%	
Independent	David Andrew Lovett	207	0.46%	–	
Marxist–Leninist	Rachel Hoffman	131	0.29%	-0.11%	
Total valid votes		45,159	100.00%		
Total rejected ballots		464	1.02%	+0.12%	
Turnout		45,623			

Source: Elections Canada

2008 Canadian federal election
Party	Candidate	Votes	%	±%	Expenditures
Liberal	Marlene Jennings	19,554	44.62%	+0.77%	$43,963
Conservative	Carmine Pontillo	7,108	16.22%	-1.22%	$45,991
Bloc Québécois	Éric Taillefer	6,962	15.89%	-4.45%	$7,443
New Democratic	Peter Deslauriers	6,641	15.16%	+3.34%	$50,302
Green	Jessica Gal	3,378	7.71%	+1.74%	$959
Marxist–Leninist	Rachel Hoffman	177	0.40%	+0.14%	
Total valid votes/Expense limit		43,820	100.00%	$83,411	
Total rejected ballots		396	0.90%		
Turnout		44,216			
Liberal hold		Swing	+1.0%		

2006 Canadian federal election
Party	Candidate	Votes	%	±%	Expenditures
Liberal	Marlene Jennings	20,235	43.85%	-9.35%	$64,145
Bloc Québécois	Alexandre Lambert	9,385	20.34%	-1.65%	$15,822
Conservative	Allen F. MacKenzie	8,048	17.44%	+7.22%	$29,196
New Democratic	Peter Deslauriers	5,455	11.82%	+3.89%	$19,445
Green	Pierre-Albert Sévigny	2,754	5.97%	+0.97%	$1,065
Libertarian	Earl Wertheimer	152	0.33%	-0.04%	
Marxist–Leninist	Rachel Hoffman	118	0.26%	+0.06%	
Total valid votes/Expense limit		46,147	100.00%	$78,444	
Liberal hold		Swing	-3.85%		

2004 Canadian federal election
Party	Candidate	Votes	%	±%	Expenditures
Liberal	Marlene Jennings	23,552	53.20%	-7.53%	$63,389
Bloc Québécois	Jean-Philippe Chartre	9,736	21.99%	+3.88%	$9,950
Conservative	William R McCullock	4,526	10.22%	-1.30%	$19,959
New Democratic	Maria Pia Chávez	3,513	7.93%	+3.20%	$6,040
Green	Jessica Gal	2,214	5.00%	+2.79%	$1,069
Marijuana	Jay Dell	479	1.08%	-0.84%	
Libertarian	Earl Wertheimer	165	0.37%	–	
Marxist–Leninist	Rachel Hoffman	88	0.20%	-0.14%	
Total valid votes/Expense limit		44,273	100.00%	$78,500	

Note: Conservative vote is compared to the total of the Canadian Alliance vote and Progressive Conservative vote in 2000 election.

2000 Canadian federal election
Party	Candidate	Votes	%	±%
Liberal	Marlene Jennings	28,328	60.72%	+4.17%
Bloc Québécois	Jeannine Ouellet	8,449	18.11%	+1.29%
Progressive Conservative	Kathy Megyery	3,352	7.19%	-12.60%
New Democratic	Bruce Toombs	2,208	4.73%	+0.31%
Alliance	Darrin Etcovitch	2,022	4.33%	
Green	Katie Graham	1,031	2.21%	
Marijuana	Grégoire Faber	897	1.92%	
Natural Law	Michael Wilson	205	0.44%	-0.65%
Marxist–Leninist	Rachel Hoffman	159	0.34%	
Total valid votes		46,651	100.00%	

Note: Canadian Alliance vote is compared to the Reform vote in 1997 election.

1997 Canadian federal election
Party	Candidate	Votes	%
Liberal	Marlene Jennings	29,582	56.56%
Progressive Conservative	John V. Hachey	10,350	19.79%
Bloc Québécois	Geneviève Dumont-Frenette	8,797	16.82%
New Democratic	André Cardinal	2,315	4.43%
Natural Law	Ronald Bessette	569	1.09%
Independent	Bryan Wolofsky	389	0.74%
Independent	Caroline Polcsak	303	0.58%
Total valid votes		52,305	100.00%
