= Bernard Patry =

Canadian politician (born 1943)

Member of Parliament for Pierrefonds—Dollard
- In office October 25, 1993 – May 2, 2011
- Preceded by: Gerry Weiner
- Succeeded by: Lysane Blanchette-Lamothe

Personal details
- Born: January 30, 1943 (age 83) Montreal, Quebec, Canada
- Party: Liberal
- Spouse: Françoise Haxaire
- Profession: Physician

Bernard Patry (French pronunciation: [bɛʁnaʁ patʁi]; born January 30, 1943) is a Canadian politician who served six terms as the Member of Parliament (MP) for the Quebec riding of Pierrefonds—Dollard from 1993 to 2011. A member of the Liberal Party, Patry was also the President of the Assemblée parlementaire de la Francophonie (APF) from 2005 to 2007.

== Career ==
Born in Montreal, Patry was a general practitioner and one of the founders of the Pierrefonds Medical Clinic. He began his political career in 1968, at the age of 25, becoming a city councillor in L'Île-Bizard, Quebec and one year later, one of the youngest mayors in Quebec. He was re-elected mayor five times and led his city for 18 years.

Patry was first elected to Parliament in 1993 as a Liberal candidate in the riding of Pierrefonds—Dollard, a position he held until 2011, when he lost re-election to NDP candidate Lysane Blanchette-Lamothe. During his time in Parliament, he notably served as Parliamentary Secretary to the Minister of Indian Affairs and Northern Development from 1996 to 1998. He was also the Chair of Standing Committee on Foreign Affairs and International Trade from 2002 to 2006.

=== Parliamentary committees ===
Shortly after his arrival on Parliament Hill in 1993, Patry was active on a number of committees, including, inter alia:

- The Sub-Committee on HIV-AIDS
- The Standing Committee on Industry
- The Standing Committee on Aboriginal and Northern Affairs
- The Standing Committee on Health
- The Subcommittee on Agenda and Procedure of the Standing Committee on Foreign Affairs and International Trade

=== Other political activity ===
Patry further served as Vice-Chair of the Prime Minister's Task Force on Urban Affairs in 2001. Prior to this, he had chaired the Quebec Liberal Caucus of the Liberal Party of Canada from 1995 to 1996.

== International honours ==
In March 1998, he was awarded the title of "Chevalier" and in March 2003, the title of "Commandeur" of the Ordre de la Pléiade, which seeks to promote dialogue between francophone cultures.

== Personal life ==
Patry is married to Françoise Haxaire. He has two sons and two granddaughters.

== Electoral record ==
2011 Canadian federal election
Party	Candidate	Votes	%	±%	Expenditures
New Democratic	Lysane Blanchette-Lamothe	16,390	34.13	+23.58	
Liberal	Bernard Patry	14,632	30.47	-16.47	
Conservative	Agop Evereklian	12,901	26.86	+1.03	
Bloc Québécois	Nicolas Jolicoeur	2,392	4.98	-4.55	
Green	Jonathan Lumer	1,710	3.56	-3.35	
Total valid votes/expense limit		48,025	100.00		
Total rejected ballots		343	0.71	+0.06	
Turnout		48,368	59.20	+1.39	
Eligible voters		81,704	–	–	

2008 Canadian federal election
Party	Candidate	Votes	%	±%	Expenditures
Liberal	Bernard Patry	21,468	46.94	-4.18	$44,617
Conservative	Pierre-Olivier Brunelle	11,815	25.83	+2.75	$85,049
New Democratic	Shameem Siddiqui	4,823	10.55	+2.87	$0
Bloc Québécois	Reny Gagnon	4,357	9.53	-2.84	$6,647
Green	Ryan Young	3,161	6.91	+1.37	$1,652
Marxist–Leninist	Marsha Fine	111	0.24	+0.04	
Total valid votes/expense limit		45,735	100.00	$85,897	
Total rejected ballots		300	0.65	-0.04	
Turnout		46,035	57.81	-2.08	

2006 Canadian federal election
Party	Candidate	Votes	%	±%	Expenditures
Liberal	Bernard Patry	24,388	51.12	-12.45	$40,479
Conservative	Don Rae	11,013	23.08	+12.32	$51,979
Bloc Québécois	Denis Martel	5,901	12.37	-3.58	$9,446
New Democratic	Shameem Siddiqui	3,664	7.68	+2.21	$3,754
Green	Leo Williams	2,645	5.54	+2.53	$1,073
Marxist–Leninist	Garnet Colly	96	0.20	+0.05	
Total valid votes/expense limit		47,707	100.00	$80,758	
Total rejected ballots		331	0.69	-0.08	
Turnout		48,038	59.89	+0.13	

2004 Canadian federal election
Party	Candidate	Votes	%	±%	Expenditures
Liberal	Bernard Patry	29,601	63.57	-9.28	$43,521
Bloc Québécois	Marie-Hélène Brunet	7,426	15.95	+4.96	$9,961
Conservative	Andrea Paine	5,010	10.76	-1.22	$30,293
New Democratic	Danielle Lustgarten	2,545	5.47	+3.42	$3,022
Green	Theodore Kouretas	1,401	3.01	–	
Marijuana	Jean-François Labrecque	511	1.10	-1.03	
Marxist–Leninist	Garnet Colly	71	0.15	–	
Total valid votes/expense limit		46,565	100.00	$79,686	
Total rejected ballots		365	0.78		
Turnout		46,930	58.76		

Note: Conservative vote is compared to the total of the Canadian Alliance vote and Progressive Conservative vote in 2000 election.

2000 Canadian federal election
Party	Candidate	Votes	%	±%
Liberal	Bernard Patry	39,357	72.85	+6.42
Bloc Québécois	Sylvie Brousseau	5,937	10.99	+0.22
Alliance	Neil Drabkin	3,481	6.44	+4.48
Progressive Conservative	John Profit	2,991	5.54	-12.67
Marijuana	Jean-François Labrecque	1,149	2.13	
New Democratic	Adam Hodgins	1,109	2.05	+0.22
Total valid votes		54,024	100.00	

Note: Canadian Alliance vote is compared to the Reform vote in 1997 election.

1997 Canadian federal election
Party	Candidate	Votes	%	±%
Liberal	Bernard Patry	38,476	66.43	+1.45
Progressive Conservative	Neil Drabkin	10,546	18.21	+5.03
Bloc Québécois	Normand Jean D'Ambrosio	6,239	10.77	-6.64
Reform	Robert Laganière	1,134	1.96	
New Democratic	David Lyons	1,060	1.83	+0.43
Natural Law	Céline Chamard	465	0.80	+0.02
Total valid votes		57,920	100.00	

1993 Canadian federal election
Party	Candidate	Votes	%	±%
Liberal	Bernard Patry	39,947	64.98	+24.77
Bloc Québécois	René de Cotret Opzoomer	10,712	17.41	
Progressive Conservative	Gerry Weiner	8,106	13.18	-36.59
New Democratic	Catherine J. Rideout-Erais	864	1.40	-5.57
Natural Law	Ruby Finkelstein	480	0.78	
National	Carlos Roldan	474	0.77	
Libertarian	Hugh Rowe	410	0.67	+0.12
Independent	Lionel Albert	386	0.63	
Commonwealth of Canada	Glenford Charles	108	0.18	+0.04
Total valid votes		61,514	100.00	

1988 Canadian federal election
Party	Candidate	Votes	%
Progressive Conservative	Gerry Weiner	27,532	49.77
Liberal	Bernard Patry	22,244	40.21
New Democratic	Pierre Razik	3,854	6.97
Rhinoceros	Jean-François Lafond	856	1.55
Independent	William Short	452	0.82
Libertarian	Hugh Rowe	302	0.55
Commonwealth of Canada	Michel Haddad	77	0.14
Total valid votes		55,317	100.00
