= Sameer Zuberi =

Canadian politician (born 1979)

Sameer Zuberi MP

Member of Parliament for Pierrefonds—Dollard
- Incumbent
- Assumed office October 21, 2019
- Preceded by: Frank Baylis

Personal details
- Born: August 1979 (age 47) Montreal, Quebec, Canada
- Party: Liberal

Sameer Zuberi MP (born August 1979) is a Canadian politician who was elected to represent the federal riding of Pierrefonds—Dollard in the House of Commons of Canada in the 2019 Canadian federal election, sitting as a member of the Liberal Party. He is the Parliamentary Secretary to the Minister of Diversity, Inclusion and Persons with Disabilities, and he serves on the Standing Committee on Foreign Affairs and International development.

== Early life and education ==
Born in Montreal, Quebec, Zuberi is the eldest of six children raised in Laval, Quebec in a multicultural family, with a mother of Scottish and Italian descent and a father who moved to Canada from Pakistan in the 1970s. He attended Marianopolis College for CEGEP and subsequently attended and graduated from Concordia University in 2004 where he obtained a BA in mathematics. In 2010, he enrolled at Université du Québec à Montréal (UQAM) in their law program, leading to his law degree in 2014.

That same year, Zuberi became the first recipient of the Juanita Westmoreland-Traoré scholarship in recognition of his social engagement. The award is bestowed to UQAM law students for their outstanding contribution to the community by using their legal training to promote human rights, social justice and equality rights.

During his time at Concordia, Zuberi was twice elected as a vice-president at the Concordia Student Union and was a member of the Concordia Council on Student Life, advocating for students, supporting diversity, and encouraging a strong sense of community. Zuberi was also a board member of City of Montreal's Intercultural Council, served on the board of the West Island Assistance Fund and was one of the founding members of the Quebec section of the Canadian Muslim Lawyers Association's (CMLA), its vice-chair in 2014 and national board member in 2015.

Zuberi lives in the riding of Pierrefonds—Dollard with his wife and their two daughters.

== Political career ==
From 1997 to 2002, Zuberi served with The Black Watch, a Canadian Forces reserve unit, and assisted his compatriots during the 1998 Ice Storm. After graduating from Concordia University in 2004, he spent a year working as an English teacher in Kuwait. Upon his return to Canada in 2006, he joined the Ottawa office of the non-profit and non-partisan National Council of Canadian Muslims (formerly known as the Canadian Council on American-Islamic Relations (CAN-CAIR)), Canada's leading Muslim advocacy organization, as the Media Relations and Human Rights Coordinator. After graduating from law school in 2014, Zuberi he appointed as diversity and engagement officer at McGill University's Faculty of Medicine and Health Sciences where he also was an elected member of the university's Senate. While at McGill, he worked to promote diversity and inclusion of Black and Indigenous students as well as students from lower socioeconomic backgrounds and those from rural Quebec.

After Frank Baylis, who was elected as member of Parliament for Pierrefonds—Dollard following the 2015 Canadian federal election, announced that he would not run in the 2019 election, Zuberi joined the Liberal Party nomination contest alongside five other candidates. This nomination contest was one of the party's largest nominations with 9,000 registered votes and a turnout of 3,200. Zuberi won the Liberal Party nomination and was elected as a member of the 43rd Canadian Parliament.

After the election, Zuberi was a member of several parliamentary committees. He has been a member of the Standing Committees on:

- COVID-19 Pandemic (April 2020–June 2020)
- Scrutiny of Regulations (February 2020–August 2020, October 2020–February 2021, March 2022–September 2023)
- Justice and Human Rights (February 2020–August 2020, October 2020–February 2021)
- Veterans Affairs (June 2021–August 2021)
- Library of Parliament (December 2021–March 2022)
- Public Safety and National Security (December 2021–June 2022)
- Foreign Affairs and International Development (June 2021–present)

Zuberi has also been a member of the Subcommittee on International Human Rights of the Standing Committee on Foreign Affairs and International Development (2020–2023).

Zuberi was the chair of the Subcommittee on International Human Rights of the Standing Committee on Foreign Affairs and International Development from June 2022 to September 2023. He has also been vice-chair of the Scrutiny of Regulations Committee from April 2022 to September 2023.

Zuberi continues to serve on the Standing Committee on Foreign Affairs and International Development.

In June 2023, the Subcommittee on International Human Rights presented a report to the House of Commons entitled The Human Rights Situation of Tibetans and the Chinese Residential Boarding School and Preschool System. Its recommendations aim to support internationally led investigations and sanctions; to protect activists and researchers from harassment and intimidation, inside and outside Canada; to advocate for independent academic research in Tibet; and, to support measures to preserve Tibetan language and culture.

As an MP, Zuberi presented a unanimous consent motion on the recognition of the Romani genocide in August 2020. He has been co-chair of the multipartisan Canadian-Uyghur Parliamentary Friendship Group and one of the leading voices in Canada and within the Canadian Liberal Party regarding human rights abuses against the Uyghur community in China.

In February 2023, Zuberi presented motion M-62, recognizing that Uyghurs and other Turkic Muslims that have fled to third countries face pressure and intimidation by the Chinese state to return to China which passed unanimously with the support of the Prime Minister and Cabinet. The motion also calls for Immigration, Refugees and Citizenship Canada's Refugee and Humanitarian Resettlement Program to expedite the entry of 10,000 Uyghurs and other Turkic Muslims in need of protection over two years, starting in 2024, into Canada.

In partnership with Montreal's West Island Chamber of Commerce, Zuberi's office created a small business outreach program with the aim to help over one thousand local businesses in Pierrefonds—Dollard.

In September 2023, Zuberi was appointed parliamentary secretary to the Minister of Diversity, Inclusion and Persons with Disabilities by Prime Minister Justin Trudeau supporting minister Kamal Khera.

In the 2025 Liberal Party of Canada leadership election, he endorsed Mark Carney.

== Electoral record ==
2025 Canadian federal election: Pierrefonds—Dollard
Party	Candidate	Votes	%	±%	Expenditures
Liberal	Sameer Zuberi	34,326	60.08	+4.07	$103,074.43
Conservative	Tanya Toledano	17,453	30.55	+9.72	$73,884.99
Bloc Québécois	Katrina Archambault	3,097	5.42	−2.50	$3,049.13
New Democratic	Kakou Richard Kouassi	1,613	2.82	−8.72	$3,643.00
People's	Gordon Nash	333	0.58	−3.13	$2,968.70
Independent	Shahid Khan	266	0.47	N/A	$1,464.55
No affiliation	Eyad Mobayed	048	0.08	N/A	$394.71
Total valid votes/expense limit		57,136	99.02	–	$129,390.60
Total rejected ballots		568	0.98		
Turnout		57,704	69.45		
Eligible voters		83,082			
Liberal hold		Swing		−2.83	
Source: Elections Canada
Note: number of eligible voters does not include voting day registrations.

2021 Canadian federal election: Pierrefonds—Dollard
Party	Candidate	Votes	%	±%	Expenditures
Liberal	Sameer Zuberi	29,296	56.0	-0.4	$68,651.52
Conservative	Terry Roberts	10,893	20.8	+3.1	$32,454.19
New Democratic	Maninderjit Kaur Tumbar	6,034	11.5	+1.2	$748.35
Bloc Québécois	Nadia Bourque	4,141	7.9	-0.2	$2,242.01
People's	Mark Sibthorpe	1,942	3.7	+2.4	$5,407.25
Total valid votes/expense limit		52,306	98.8	–	$111,883.95
Total rejected ballots		615	1.2		
Turnout		52,921	64.7		
Eligible voters		81,839			
Liberal hold		Swing		-1.8	
Source: Elections Canada

2019 Canadian federal election: Pierrefonds—Dollard
Party	Candidate	Votes	%	±%	Expenditures
Liberal	Sameer Zuberi	31,305	56.43	-2.23	$48,975.17
Conservative	Mariam Ishak	9,797	17.66	-2.33	$34,368.98
New Democratic	Bruno Ibrahim El-Khoury	5,687	10.25	-6.13	$6,127.99
Bloc Québécois	Edline Henri	4,469	8.06	+4.57	none listed
Green	Lisa Mintz	2,866	5.17	+3.69	$1,239.20
People's	Lee Weishar	711	1.28	–	$4,040.64
Independent	Martin Plante	394	0.71	–	$7,089.24
Independent	Shahid Khan	242	0.44	–	$1,502.46
Total valid votes/expense limit		55,471	100.0		
Total rejected ballots		682			
Turnout		56,153	67.4		
Eligible voters		83,369			
Liberal hold		Swing		+0.05	
Source: Elections Canada
