= Hélène LeBlanc =

Canadian politician

Shadow Minister for Industry
- In office April 19, 2012 – August 12, 2013
- Leader: Thomas Mulcair
- Preceded by: Guy Caron
- Succeeded by: Chris Charlton

Member of Parliament for LaSalle—Émard
- In office May 30, 2011 – August 4, 2015
- Preceded by: Lise Zarac
- Succeeded by: Riding dissolved

Chair of the Standing Committee on Status of Women
- In office October 29, 2013 – August 4, 2015
- Minister: Kellie Leitch
- Preceded by: Lysane Blanchette-Lamothe
- Succeeded by: Marilyn Gladu

Personal details
- Born: March 27, 1958 (age 68) Lyster, Quebec
- Party: New Democratic Party

Hélène LeBlanc (born March 27, 1958) is a Canadian politician. She served in the House of Commons of Canada from 2011 to 2015, representing the riding of LaSalle—Émard as a member of the New Democratic Party. In the official opposition shadow cabinet, she was critic for Industry.

== Early life and career ==
LeBlanc was born on March 27, 1958, in Lyster, Quebec. Her father was a doctor and her mother was a school trustee and mayor of Lyster, sparking her interest in politics. LeBlanc received a Bachelor of Arts degree in 1979 from Université Sainte-Anne and a Bachelor of Education degree from the University of Ottawa in 1983.

LeBlanc worked as an educator, teaching French in Vancouver and Ottawa. She also served as an interpreter and guide for the Canada Museums of Science and Technology Corporation in Ottawa and the Canada Agriculture Museum.

LeBlanc later received a Bachelor of Science degree in agriculture and environment from McGill University in 2004. An agronomist by training, she served as a project manager for the Conseil d'assainissement et d'aménagement du ruisseau Lacorne prior to her election as MP.

LeBlanc also worked as an assistant to persons suffering from Alzheimers Baluchon Alzheimer and as an agro-environment officer with the Fédération de l’Union des producteurs agricoles de l’Outaouais-Laurentides.

LeBlanc is an avid cyclist and a member of Vélo Québec.

== Member of Parliament ==
LeBlanc first entered politics in 2009 with Projet Montréal, seeking the position of borough councilor for the district of Saint-Paul-Émard. Although her campaign was unsuccessful, she gained the attention of the New Democratic Party (NDP) and was chosen as their nominee in the 2011 federal election to represent the riding of LaSalle—Émard. LeBlanc was elected on May 2, 2011, defeating freshman incumbent Lise Zarac of the Liberal Party with 42.2% of the vote. She assumed office on May 30, 2011.

On May 26, 2011, then-leader of the NDP Jack Layton named LeBlanc to his shadow cabinet as critic for Science and Technology. She was later promoted to critic for Industry in 2012 by Layton’s successor, Thomas Mulcair.

In these roles, LeBlanc played a role in the development of policy on science, technology, industry, and innovation for the NDP. She defended the right of government scientists to speak freely to the media and public, worked to reform Canada’s research and development programs, and advocated for green initiatives in Canadian research.

LeBlanc became an active figure in the arena of science and technology, bringing visibility to the NDP in these areas. In 2011, she attended the annual conference of the American Association for the Advancement of Science Conference as the official delegate of the NDP. Also in 2011, LeBlanc was part of a keynote panel at the Canadian Science Policy Conference. She met to discuss science policy with foreign diplomats including the Ambassador of the United States and the Ambassador of Mexico.

In the 2015 federal election, LeBlanc was defeated in the redistributed riding of LaSalle—Émard—Verdun by Liberal David Lametti.

== Electoral record ==
2015 Canadian federal election: LaSalle—Émard—Verdun
Party	Candidate	Votes	%	±%	Expenditures
Liberal	David Lametti	23,603	43.90	+25.61	$93,016.24
New Democratic	Hélène LeBlanc	15,566	28.95	-16.22	$46,314.39
Bloc Québécois	Gilbert Paquette	9,164	17.05	-6.39	$43,806.34
Conservative	Mohammad Zamir	3,713	6.91	-2.83	–
Green	Lorraine Banville	1,717	3.19	+0.64	–
Total valid votes/expense limit		53,763	98.49		$221,667.78
Total rejected ballots		823	1.51	–	
Turnout		54,586	64.84	–	
Eligible voters		84,192			
Liberal notional gain from New Democratic		Swing		+20.91	
Source: Elections Canada

2011 Canadian federal election
Party	Candidate	Votes	%	±%	Expenditures
New Democratic	Hélène LeBlanc	17,691	42.15	+28.91	
Liberal	Lise Zarac	11,172	26.62	-13.97	
Bloc Québécois	Carl Dubois	6,151	14.66	-9.81	
Conservative	Chang-Tao Jimmy Yu	5,516	13.14	-2.89	
Green	Lorraine Banville	946	2.25	-1.47	
Marxist–Leninist	Yves Le Seigle	288	0.69	+0.35	
Rhinoceros	Guillaume Berger-Richard	208	0.50	–	
Total valid votes		41,972	100.00		
Total rejected ballots		578	1.36	-0.1	
Turnout		42,550	57.10	-0.7	
Eligible voters		74,515	–	–	
