= Lise Zarac =

Canadian politician (born 1950)

Member of Parliament for LaSalle—Émard
- In office October 14, 2008 – May 1, 2011
- Preceded by: Paul Martin
- Succeeded by: Hélène LeBlanc

Personal details
- Born: August 22, 1950 (age 75) Montreal, Quebec, Canada
- Party: Liberal (federal)
- Other political affiliations: Équipe Barbe Team (local)

Lise Zarac (French pronunciation: [liz zaʁak]; born August 22, 1950) is a Canadian politician who represented LaSalle—Émard in the House of Commons from 2008 to 2011. A member of the Liberal Party, she also sat in the Montreal City Council from 2017 to 2021.

== Biography ==
Zarac represented the federal electoral district of LaSalle—Émard in Montreal for one term from 2008 to 2011 as a member of the Liberal Party, succeeding former Prime Minister Paul Martin. She was defeated in her re-election bid by Hélène LeBlanc of the New Democratic Party (NDP).

In 2017 she turned to municipal politics, and was elected to represent the Cecil-P.-Newman district in LaSalle in the Montreal City Council as part of the local LaSalle party Équipe Barbe Team. Ahead of the 2021 municipal election she announced her retirement from politics.
