= LaSalle—Émard =

Former federal electoral district in Quebec, Canada

Quebec electoral district
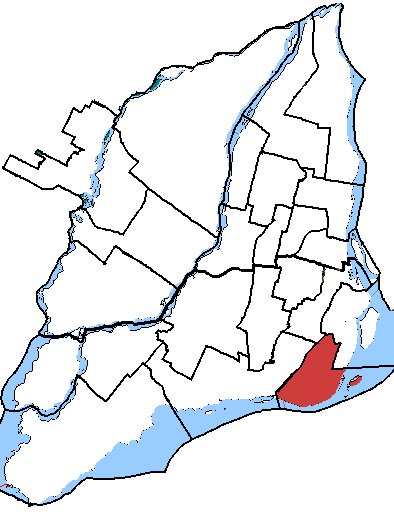
- LaSalle—Émard in relation to other federal electoral districts in Montreal
- Coordinates: 45.439°N 73.615°W

Defunct federal electoral district
- Legislature: House of Commons
- District created: 1987
- District abolished: 2012
- First contested: 1988
- Last contested: 2011
- District webpage: profile, map

Demographics
- Population (2011): 99,845
- Electors (2011): 74,505
- Area (km²): 20.22
- Census division: Montreal
- Census subdivision: Montreal

LaSalle—Émard was a federal electoral district in the Canadian province of Quebec which was represented in the House of Commons from 1988 to 2015. Its population in 2001 was 99,767. The MP from 1988 to 2008 was Paul Martin, who served as prime minister of Canada from 2003 to 2006.

As part of redistribution begun in 2012 the riding is now known by its current name and boundaries of LaSalle—Émard—Verdun while the southwestern portion joined the new riding of Dorval—Lachine—LaSalle.

== Geography ==
The district included the Montreal borough of LaSalle and the Southwest borough's Ville-Émard and Côte-Saint-Paul neighbourhoods. The neighbouring ridings were Notre-Dame-de-Grâce—Lachine, Westmount—Ville-Marie, Jeanne-Le Ber, Brossard—La Prairie and Châteauguay—Saint-Constant.

=== Political geography ===
Historically, the LaSalle part of the riding was fairly Liberal-leaning, with a few Bloc pockets in the west. Meanwhile, Ville-Émard and Côte-Saint-Paul were mostly Bloc areas. However, the division was swept over by the NDP surge in the 2011 Canadian federal election.

== History ==
The electoral district was created in 1987 from LaSalle, Saint-Henri—Westmount and Verdun—Saint-Paul ridings.

=== Member of parliament ===
This riding elected the following members of parliament:

Parliament	Years	Member	Party
LaSalle—Émard; Riding created from Lasalle, Saint-Henri—Westmount and Verdun—Saint-Paul
34th	1988–1993	Paul Martin	Liberal
35th	1993–1997	Paul Martin	Liberal
36th	1997–2000	Paul Martin	Liberal
37th	2000–2004	Paul Martin	Liberal
38th	2004–2006	Paul Martin	Liberal
39th	2006–2008	Paul Martin	Liberal
40th	2008–2011	Lise Zarac	Liberal
41st	2011–2015	Hélène LeBlanc	New Democratic
Riding dissolved into LaSalle—Émard—Verdun and Dorval—Lachine—LaSalle

== Election results ==
2011 Canadian federal election
Party	Candidate	Votes	%	±%	Expenditures
New Democratic	Hélène LeBlanc	17,691	42.15	+28.91	
Liberal	Lise Zarac	11,172	26.62	-13.97	
Bloc Québécois	Carl Dubois	6,151	14.66	-9.81	
Conservative	Chang-Tao Jimmy Yu	5,516	13.14	-2.89	
Green	Lorraine Banville	946	2.25	-1.47	
Marxist–Leninist	Yves Le Seigle	288	0.69	+0.35	
Rhinoceros	Guillaume Berger-Richard	208	0.50	–	
Total valid votes		41,972	100.00		
Total rejected ballots		578	1.36	-0.1	
Turnout		42,550	57.10	-0.7	
Eligible voters		74,515	–	–	

2008 Canadian federal election
Party	Candidate	Votes	%	±%	Expenditures
Liberal	Lise Zarac	17,226	40.59	-7.82	$44,447
Bloc Québécois	Frédéric Isaya	10,384	24.47	-4.25	$8,744
Conservative	Béatrice Guay-Pepper	6,802	16.03	+3.28	$24,841
New Democratic	Amy Darwish	5,622	13.24	+7.28	$3,066
Green	Kristina Vitelli	1,579	3.72	+0.51	$64
Independent	Antoine Kaluzny	674	1.58	--	$22,982
Marxist–Leninist	Yves Le Seigle	144	0.33	+0.01	
Total		42,431	100.00	$82,752	
Rejected ballots		648	1.50		
Total number of votes		43,079	57.82		

2006 Canadian federal election
Party	Candidate	Votes	%	±%	Expenditures
Liberal	Paul Martin	22,751	48.41	-8.3	$59,334
Bloc Québécois	May Chiu	13,501	28.72	-2.0	$16,750
Conservative	Georges-Alexandre Bastien	5,994	12.75	+7.7	$17,795
New Democratic	Russ Johnson	2,805	5.96	+1.7	
Green	Serge Bellemare	1,512	3.21	+1.0	
Independent	Jean-Philippe Lebleu	281	0.59	--	$3,081
Marxist–Leninist	Jean-Paul Bédard	152	0.32	-0.1	
Total		46,996	100.00	$78,209	
Rejected ballots		599	1.26		
Total number of votes		47,595	62.10		

2004 Canadian federal election
Party	Candidate	Votes	%	±%	Expenditures
Liberal	Paul Martin	25,806	56.6	-9.2	$58,357
Bloc Québécois	Thierry Larrivée	14,001	30.7	+6.5	$6,381
Conservative	Nicole Roy-Arcelin	2,271	5.0	-1.0	$5,075
New Democratic	Rebecca Blaikie	1,995	4.4	+2.7	$2,226
Green	Douglas Jack	1,000	2.2	–	$410
Marijuana	Marc-Boris St-Maurice	349	0.8	-0.8	
Marxist–Leninist	Jean-Paul Bédard	210	0.5	–	
Total		45,632	100.0	$78,239	

Change from 2000 for top three parties is based on redistributed results. Conservative Party change is based on the total of Canadian Alliance and Progressive Conservative Party totals.

2000 Canadian federal election
Party	Candidate	Votes	%	±%
Liberal	Paul Martin	32,069	65.8	+4.9
Bloc Québécois	Denis Martel	11,805	24.2	-0.2
Alliance	Giuseppe Joe De Santis	1,806	3.7	
Progressive Conservative	Deepak T. Massand	1,111	2.3	-9.9
New Democratic	David Bernans	837	1.7	0.0
Marijuana	Mathieux St-Cyr	765	1.6	
Natural Law	Gilles Bigras	273	0.6	-0.3
Communist	Irma Ortiz	107	0.2	
Total valid votes		48,773	100.0	

1997 Canadian federal election
Party	Candidate	Votes	%	±%	Expenditures
Liberal	Paul Martin	32,317	60.87	+1.4	$42,021
Bloc Québécois	Jean-Pierre Chalifoux	12,953	24.40	−8.9	$19,467
Progressive Conservative	Josée Bélanger	6,445	12.14	7.5	$1,759
New Democratic	Joe Bowman	920	1.73	0.3	$600
Natural Law	Russell Guest	453	0.85		$0
Total valid votes		53,088	100.00		
Rejected, unmarked and declined ballots		1,642			
Turnout		54,730	77.99		
Electors on the lists		70,173			
Sources: Official Results, Elections Canada and Financial Returns, Elections Canada. Percentage change numbers are not factored for redistribution.

1993 Canadian federal election
Party	Candidate	Votes	%	±%
Liberal	Paul Martin	30,866	59.5	+14.1
Bloc Québécois	Éric Cimon	17,280	33.3	
Progressive Conservative	Johanne Senécal	2,368	4.6	-38.1
New Democratic	Richard Belzile	708	1.4	-9.2
Natural Law	George Amarica	419	0.8	
Commonwealth of Canada	Giampaolo Carli	120	0.2	0.0
Abolitionist	Thérèse Turmel	103	0.2	
Total valid votes		51,864	100.0	

1988 Canadian federal election
Party	Candidate	Votes	%
Liberal	Paul Martin	23,394	45.5
Progressive Conservative	Claude Lanthier	21,979	42.7
New Democratic	Jean-Claude Bohrer	5,458	10.6
Independent	Ginette Boutet	305	0.6
Communist	Ginette Gauthier	212	0.4
Commonwealth of Canada	Nancy Guice	117	0.2
Total valid votes		51,465	100.0

== See also ==
- List of Canadian electoral districts
- Historical federal electoral districts of Canada

Parliament of Canada
Preceded by Saint-Maurice	Constituency represented by the Prime Minister; 2003–2006	Succeeded by Calgary Southwest
