= Isabelle Morin =

Canadian politician

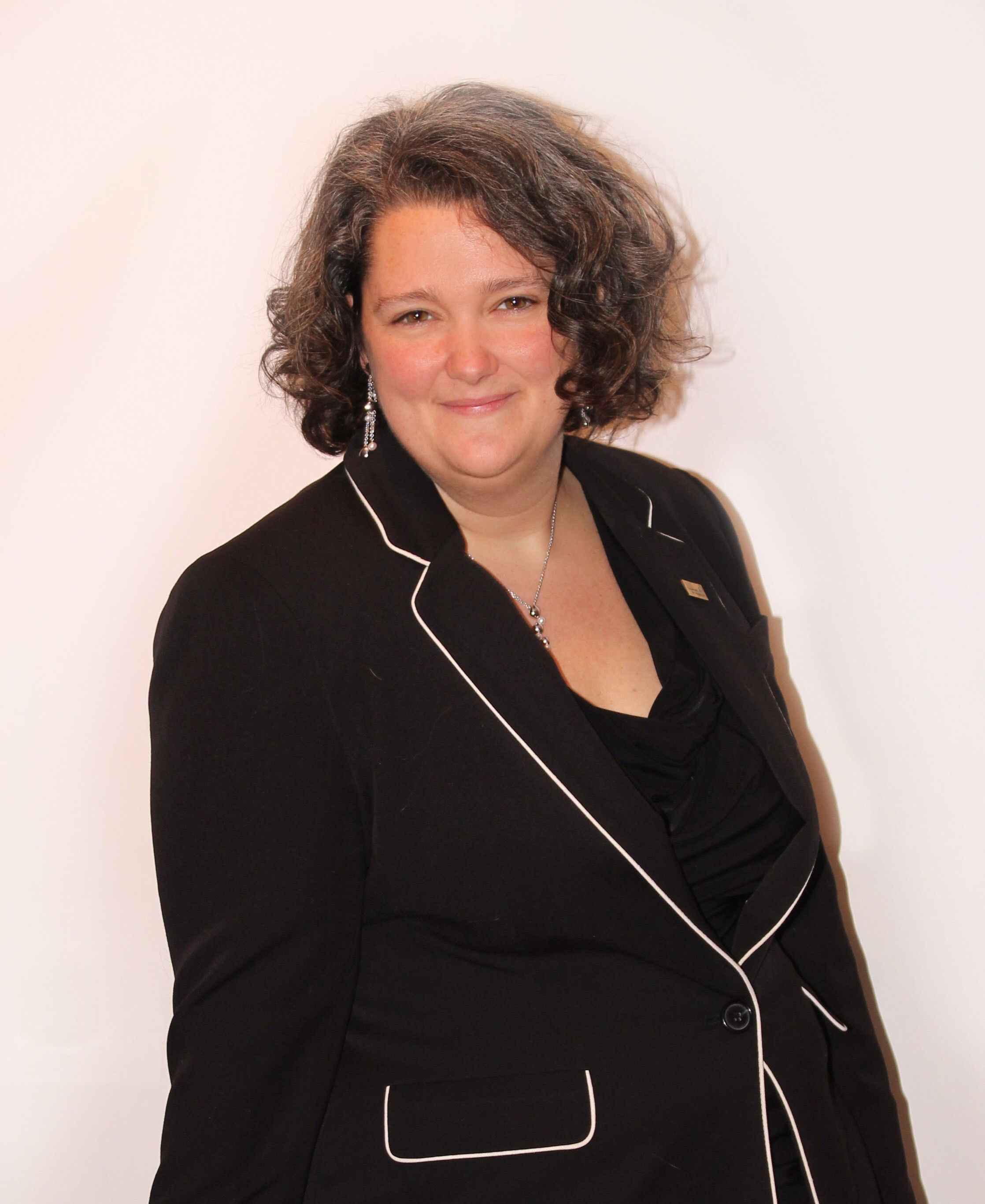
- Isabelle Morin, 2019

Member of Parliament for Notre-Dame-de-Grâce—Lachine
- In office May 2, 2011 – August 4, 2015
- Preceded by: Marlene Jennings
- Succeeded by: District abolished

Personal details
- Born: February 14, 1985 (age 41) Quebec City, Quebec
- Party: New Democratic Party
- Profession: Teacher

Isabelle Morin (born February 14, 1985) is a Canadian politician, who represented the Quebec riding of Notre-Dame-de-Grâce—Lachine in the House of Commons of Canada under the banner of the New Democratic Party from May 2011 to November 2015. She defeated the local long-time liberal MP Marlene Jennings by more than 4,000 votes in the 2011 federal election.

Morin has a diploma in literature from Cégep François-Xavier Garneau in Quebec City and a bachelor of education from the Université de Sherbrooke. During her university studies, she was executive vice-president of the students’ federation (FEUS) and sat on the board of directors of the Fédération universitaire du Québec. In 2007 she co-founded Vélorution, an organization promoting the rights of bicyclists in Sherbrooke.

Before becoming a politician Morin taught French and drama at the secondary school Cavelier-De LaSalle. She also taught at the adult education 'Centre Louis-Jolliet' and 'Centre Saint-Michel' and the 'Centre de détention Sherbrooke' on rue Talbot.

Prior to being elected Member of Parliament, Morin took part in various humanitarian missions abroad and visited more than 25 countries including Guatemala where she learnt a lot about fair trade. While travelling she came to appreciate the importance of intercultural exchange and cooperation.

== Parliamentary work ==
As the Official Opposition's deputy critic for Seniors, Morin fought to restore the retirement age from 67 to 65. She also served as the NDP critic for animal welfare and was president of the NDP Youth Caucus.

Beginning in 2011, Morin served as a member of the Standing Committee on Transport, Infrastructure and Communities. Her work in this role focused, in particular, on road, bridge and aviation safety. Deeming this issue one of her key priorities, Morin urged the Conservative government of Stephen Harper via Bill C-305 to adopt a national strategy on transport in 2012. She was involved in numerous initiatives including federal funding for the new Champlain Bridge as well as considerable investments in the infrastructure in her riding of Notre-Dame-de-Grâce—Lachine.

Morin also paid close attention to environmental issues in her constituency, such as air and water quality and noise pollution. She was a strong advocate for the preservation of Dorval Municipal Golf Course, whose green space faced destruction due to the decision of the Airport of Montreal (ADM) to repurpose the land for new screening facilities. Morin additionally supported the Save Our Green Space campaign launched by local citizens. She tabled several petitions in the House of Commons, sent a letter to federal Transport Minister Lisa Raitt and participated in a demonstration on Parliament Hill to draw the government's attention to the problem.

Acting in her role as MP for Notre-Dame-de-Grâce—Lachine, Morin spoke out on various issues in the House of Commons:

- Dismantling of postal services and reduction of home delivery by Canada Post;

- Human trafficking;

- The conservative government's budget cuts for aerospace industry and employment insurance;

- Lack of coherent legal framework concerning animal rights.

== 2015 general election ==
Morin was defeated in the 2015 election by Liberal Anju Dhillon.

== Electoral record ==
2015 Canadian federal election: Dorval—Lachine—LaSalle
Party	Candidate	Votes	%	±%	Expenditures
Liberal	Anju Dhillon	29,974	54.89	+25.49	$97,977.49
New Democratic	Isabelle Morin	11,769	21.55	-19.57	$52,909.84
Conservative	Daniela Chivu	6,049	11.08	-3.07	$25,233.35
Bloc Québécois	Jean-Frédéric Vaudry	5,338	9.78	-1.76	–
Green	Vincent J. Carbonneau	1,245	2.28	-0.72	–
Independent	Soulèye Ndiaye	230	0.42	–	$3,623.98
Total valid votes/Expense limit		54,605	100.0		$224,217.32
Total rejected ballots		593	–	–	
Turnout		55,198	–	–	
Eligible voters		85,587			
Source: Elections Canada

2011 Canadian federal election
Party	Candidate	Votes	%	±%
New Democratic	Isabelle Morin	17,943	39.73%	+24.57%
Liberal	Marlene Jennings	14,407	31.90%	-12.72%
Conservative	Matthew Conway	6,574	14.56%	-1.66%
Bloc Québécois	Gabrielle Ladouceur-Despins	3,983	8.82%	-7.07%
Green	Jessica Gal	1,914	4.24%	-3.47%
Independent	David Andrew Lovett	207	0.46%	–
Marxist–Leninist	Rachel Hoffman	131	0.29%	-0.11%
Total valid votes		45,159	100.00%	
Total rejected ballots		464	1.02%	+0.12%
Turnout		45,623		

Source: Elections Canada
