= Pierrefonds—Dollard =

Federal electoral district in Quebec, Canada

Coordinates: 45.4941°N 73.8503°W

Quebec electoral district
- Interactive map of riding boundaries from the 2015 federal election

Federal electoral district
- Legislature: House of Commons
MP
Sameer Zuberi
Liberal
- District created: 1986
- First contested: 1988
- Last contested: 2025
- District webpage: profile, map

Demographics
- Population (2016): 108,587
- Electors (2015): 84,978
- Area (km²): 53
- Pop. density (per km²): 2,048.8
- Census division: Montreal
- Census subdivision(s): Montreal (part), Dollard-des-Ormeaux

Pierrefonds—Dollard (French pronunciation: [pjɛʁfɔ̃ dɔlaʁ]) is a federal electoral district in Quebec, Canada, which has been represented in the House of Commons since 1988. Its population was 108,587 at the 2016 Canadian census.

This riding occupies the northwest part of the Island of Montreal on the Lac des Deux-Montagnes and Rivière des Prairies. It contains the cities of Dollard-des-Ormeaux, Pierrefonds, Roxboro and L'Île-Bizard.

Manufacturing is the main industry, followed by retail trade. Approximately 17% of the population has a university degree, while just over 4% has less than a Grade 9 education. The average family income is $75,497 with an unemployment rate of 6.5%. According to the 2001 Canadian census, 37% of the population lists English as their mother tongue, while French is the mother tongue for 32% of the population, The district is home to a significant number of Italians, Chinese, and South Asians. The total immigrant population is almost 30%.

Since 2019 its member of Parliament (MP) has been Sameer Zuberi of the Liberal Party.

== Geography ==
The district includes the Montreal boroughs of Pierrefonds-Roxboro and L'Île-Bizard–Sainte-Geneviève, as well as the city of Dollard-des-Ormeaux.

The neighbouring ridings are Dorval—Lachine—LaSalle, Lac-Saint-Louis, Mirabel, Rivière-des-Mille-Îles, Laval—Les Îles, Ahuntsic-Cartierville and Saint-Laurent.

== Demographics ==
According to the 2021 Canadian census

Religions: 54.6% Christian, 11.6% Muslim, 7.8% Jewish, 4.8% Hindu, 18.0% None

== History ==
This riding was established in 1986 by combining parts of Dollard and Vaudreuil ridings. The 1996 redistribution moved nine per cent of the population of the riding into Lac-St-Louis.

In the redistribution of 2004, 91% of the riding was retained.

There were no changes to this riding during the 2012 electoral redistribution or the 2022 electoral redistribution.

=== Members of Parliament ===
This riding has elected the following MPs:

Parliament	Years	Member	Party
Pierrefonds—Dollard; Riding created from Dollard and Vaudreuil
34th	1988–1993	Gerry Weiner	Progressive Conservative
35th	1993–1997	Bernard Patry	Liberal
36th	1997–2000	Bernard Patry	Liberal
37th	2000–2004	Bernard Patry	Liberal
38th	2004–2006	Bernard Patry	Liberal
39th	2006–2008	Bernard Patry	Liberal
40th	2008–2011	Bernard Patry	Liberal
41st	2011–2015	Lysane Blanchette-Lamothe	New Democratic
42nd	2015–2019	Frank Baylis	Liberal
43rd	2019–2021	Sameer Zuberi	Liberal
44th	2021–2025	Sameer Zuberi	Liberal
45th	2025–present	Sameer Zuberi	Liberal

== Election results ==
2025 Canadian federal election
Party	Candidate	Votes	%	±%	Expenditures
Liberal	Sameer Zuberi	34,326	60.08	+4.07	$103,074.43
Conservative	Tanya Toledano	17,453	30.55	+9.72	$73,884.99
Bloc Québécois	Katrina Archambault	3,097	5.42	−2.50	$3,049.13
New Democratic	Kakou Richard Kouassi	1,613	2.82	−8.72	$3,643.00
People's	Gordon Nash	333	0.58	−3.13	$2,968.70
Independent	Shahid Khan	266	0.47	N/A	$1,464.55
No affiliation	Eyad Mobayed	048	0.08	N/A	$394.71
Total valid votes/expense limit		57,136	99.02	–	$129,390.60
Total rejected ballots		568	0.98		
Turnout		57,704	69.45		
Eligible voters		83,082			
Liberal hold		Swing		−2.83	
Source: Elections Canada
Note: number of eligible voters does not include voting day registrations.

2021 Canadian federal election
Party	Candidate	Votes	%	±%	Expenditures
Liberal	Sameer Zuberi	29,296	56.0	-0.4	$68,651.52
Conservative	Terry Roberts	10,893	20.8	+3.1	$32,454.19
New Democratic	Maninderjit Kaur Tumbar	6,034	11.5	+1.2	$748.35
Bloc Québécois	Nadia Bourque	4,141	7.9	-0.2	$2,242.01
People's	Mark Sibthorpe	1,942	3.7	+2.4	$5,407.25
Total valid votes/expense limit		52,306	98.8	–	$111,883.95
Total rejected ballots		615	1.2		
Turnout		52,921	64.7		
Eligible voters		81,839			
Liberal hold		Swing		-1.8	
Source: Elections Canada

2019 Canadian federal election
Party	Candidate	Votes	%	±%	Expenditures
Liberal	Sameer Zuberi	31,305	56.43	-2.23	$48,975.17
Conservative	Mariam Ishak	9,797	17.66	-2.33	$34,368.98
New Democratic	Bruno Ibrahim El-Khoury	5,687	10.25	-6.13	$6,127.99
Bloc Québécois	Edline Henri	4,469	8.06	+4.57	none listed
Green	Lisa Mintz	2,866	5.17	+3.69	$1,239.20
People's	Lee Weishar	711	1.28	–	$4,040.64
Independent	Martin Plante	394	0.71	–	$7,089.24
Independent	Shahid Khan	242	0.44	–	$1,502.46
Total valid votes/expense limit		55,471	100.0		
Total rejected ballots		682			
Turnout		56,153	67.4		
Eligible voters		83,369			
Liberal hold		Swing		+0.05	
Source: Elections Canada

2015 Canadian federal election
Party	Candidate	Votes	%	±%	Expenditures
Liberal	Frank Baylis	34,319	58.66	+28.19	$87,932.66
Conservative	Valérie Assouline	11,694	19.99	-6.87	$108,288.54
New Democratic	Lysane Blanchette-Lamothe	9,584	16.38	-17.75	$71,065.57
Bloc Québécois	Natalie Laplante	2,043	3.49	-1.49	$2,860.59
Green	Abraham Weizfeld	865	1.48	-2.08	–
Total valid votes/expense limit		58,505	100.00		$223,535.94
Total rejected ballots		368	–	–	
Turnout		58,873	–	–	
Eligible voters		84,978			
Source: Elections Canada

2011 Canadian federal election
Party	Candidate	Votes	%	±%	Expenditures
New Democratic	Lysane Blanchette-Lamothe	16,390	34.13	+23.58	$2,044.16
Liberal	Bernard Patry	14,632	30.47	-16.47	$59,064.10
Conservative	Agop Evereklian	12,901	26.86	+1.03	$107,835.83
Bloc Québécois	Nicolas Jolicoeur	2,392	4.98	-4.55	$3,427.37
Green	Jonathan Lumer	1,710	3.56	-3.35	$8,330.03
Total valid votes/expense limit		48,025	100.00		
Total rejected ballots		343	0.71	+0.06	
Turnout		48,368	59.20	+1.39	
Eligible voters		81,704	–	–	

2008 Canadian federal election
Party	Candidate	Votes	%	±%	Expenditures
Liberal	Bernard Patry	21,468	46.94	-4.18	$44,617
Conservative	Pierre-Olivier Brunelle	11,815	25.83	+2.75	$85,049
New Democratic	Shameem Siddiqui	4,823	10.55	+2.87	$0
Bloc Québécois	Reny Gagnon	4,357	9.53	-2.84	$6,647
Green	Ryan Young	3,161	6.91	+1.37	$1,652
Marxist–Leninist	Marsha Fine	111	0.24	+0.04	
Total valid votes/expense limit		45,735	100.00	$85,897	
Total rejected ballots		300	0.65	-0.04	
Turnout		46,035	57.81	-2.08	

2006 Canadian federal election
Party	Candidate	Votes	%	±%	Expenditures
Liberal	Bernard Patry	24,388	51.12	-12.45	$40,479
Conservative	Don Rae	11,013	23.08	+12.32	$51,979
Bloc Québécois	Denis Martel	5,901	12.37	-3.58	$9,446
New Democratic	Shameem Siddiqui	3,664	7.68	+2.21	$3,754
Green	Leo Williams	2,645	5.54	+2.53	$1,073
Marxist–Leninist	Garnet Colly	96	0.20	+0.05	
Total valid votes/expense limit		47,707	100.00	$80,758	
Total rejected ballots		331	0.69	-0.08	
Turnout		48,038	59.89	+0.13	

2004 Canadian federal election
Party	Candidate	Votes	%	±%	Expenditures
Liberal	Bernard Patry	29,601	63.57	-9.28	$43,521
Bloc Québécois	Marie-Hélène Brunet	7,426	15.95	+4.96	$9,961
Conservative	Andrea Paine	5,010	10.76	-1.22	$30,293
New Democratic	Danielle Lustgarten	2,545	5.47	+3.42	$3,022
Green	Theodore Kouretas	1,401	3.01	–	
Marijuana	Jean-François Labrecque	511	1.10	-1.03	
Marxist–Leninist	Garnet Colly	71	0.15	–	
Total valid votes/expense limit		46,565	100.00	$79,686	
Total rejected ballots		365	0.78		
Turnout		46,930	58.76		

Note: Conservative vote is compared to the total of the Canadian Alliance vote and Progressive Conservative vote in 2000 election.

2000 Canadian federal election
Party	Candidate	Votes	%	±%
Liberal	Bernard Patry	39,357	72.85	+6.42
Bloc Québécois	Sylvie Brousseau	5,937	10.99	+0.22
Alliance	Neil Drabkin	3,481	6.44	+4.48
Progressive Conservative	John Profit	2,991	5.54	-12.67
Marijuana	Jean-François Labrecque	1,149	2.13	
New Democratic	Adam Hodgins	1,109	2.05	+0.22
Total valid votes		54,024	100.00	

Note: Canadian Alliance vote is compared to the Reform vote in 1997 election.

1997 Canadian federal election
Party	Candidate	Votes	%	±%
Liberal	Bernard Patry	38,476	66.43	+1.45
Progressive Conservative	Neil Drabkin	10,546	18.21	+5.03
Bloc Québécois	Normand Jean D'Ambrosio	6,239	10.77	-6.64
Reform	Robert Laganière	1,134	1.96	
New Democratic	David Lyons	1,060	1.83	+0.43
Natural Law	Céline Chamard	465	0.80	+0.02
Total valid votes		57,920	100.00	

1993 Canadian federal election
Party	Candidate	Votes	%	±%
Liberal	Bernard Patry	39,947	64.98	+24.77
Bloc Québécois	René de Cotret Opzoomer	10,712	17.41	
Progressive Conservative	Gerry Weiner	8,106	13.18	-36.59
New Democratic	Catherine J. Rideout-Erais	864	1.40	-5.57
Natural Law	Ruby Finkelstein	480	0.78	
National	Carlos Roldan	474	0.77	
Libertarian	Hugh Rowe	410	0.67	+0.12
Independent	Lionel Albert	386	0.63	
Commonwealth of Canada	Glenford Charles	108	0.18	+0.04
Total valid votes		61,514	100.00	

1988 Canadian federal election
Party	Candidate	Votes	%
Progressive Conservative	Gerry Weiner	27,532	49.77
Liberal	Bernard Patry	22,244	40.21
New Democratic	Pierre Razik	3,854	6.97
Rhinoceros	Jean-François Lafond	856	1.55
Independent	William Short	452	0.82
Libertarian	Hugh Rowe	302	0.55
Commonwealth of Canada	Michel Haddad	77	0.14
Total valid votes		55,317	100.00

== See also ==
- List of Canadian electoral districts
- Historical federal electoral districts of Canada
