= Raymond Bachand =

Canadian politician (born 1947)

Raymond Bachand OC
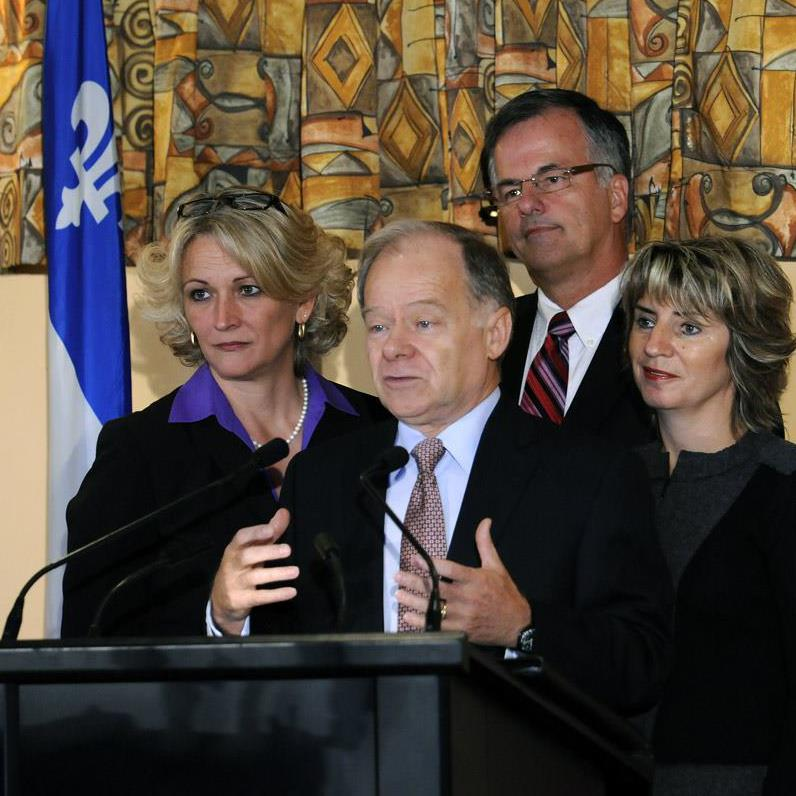
- Raymond Bachand announcing his candidacy for Quebec Liberal Party leadership

Member of the National Assembly of Quebec for Outremont
- In office 12 December 2005 – 26 August 2013
- Preceded by: Yves Séguin
- Succeeded by: Philippe Couillard

Personal details
- Born: 22 October 1947 (age 78) Montreal, Quebec
- Party: Liberal Party of Québec
- Profession: Attorney, professor
- Cabinet: Minister of Finances and Revenue

Raymond Bachand OC (born 22 October 1947, in Montreal, Quebec) is a former politician, a businessman and a lawyer in Quebec, Canada. He was the Member of the National Assembly of Quebec (MNA) for the riding of Outremont, and a member of the Quebec Liberal Party caucus. He is the former Minister of Finance and Revenue in the majority government of Premier of Quebec Jean Charest, and was previously Minister for Tourism during the minority government mandate from April 2007 to October 2008, and Minister of economic development of innovation and export trade from his election until June 2009. Bachand is a former trade unionist. On 26 August 2013, Bachand resigned his seat.

== Early life and education ==
Bachand was born 22 October 1947 in Montreal, Quebec. He was educated at the Collège Stanislas, a private school. He obtained a law degree from the Université de Montréal in 1969 and was admitted to the Quebec Bar in 1970. Bachand also completed a master's degree and a doctorate at Harvard Business School.

Before entering politics, he worked in several key positions including in the Quebec's public sector where he worked in the Ministry of Labour as well as in the premier's office. Bachand was a Quebec sovereignist during the 1980 referendum, and an organizer for the 'Yes' campaign. He changed his mind, and is now a Canadian federalist.

He also taught at the École des hautes études commerciales de Montréal in the early 1970s.

He was once the vice-president of Culinar and Métro-Richelieu and was also president of Groupe Secor during the 1980s and 1990s. He was president-director general of the Fonds de solidarité des travailleurs du Québec (FTQ), a major union fund, between 1997 and 2001. He was also part of the administration of Montreal newspaper Le Devoir and member of Montreal's Chamber of Commerce.

== Politics ==
Bachand was elected on 12 December 2005, in Outremont in a by-election after the retirement of former Finance Minister Yves Séguin. There was speculation that Bachand would also occupy that post, but he was awarded the portfolio of Economic Development.

Bachand was easily re-elected in the 2007 elections defeating Parti Québécois's Salim Laaroussi by nearly 6,000 votes. He was re-appointed as the minister of economic development, innovation and international trade and was also given the portfolios of tourism and the region of Montreal. Following the 2008 election, Bachand gave up the tourism portfolio to Laporte MNA Nicole Ménard. On 8 April 2009, following the retirement of Monique Jérôme-Forget, Bachand was named the new Finance Minister.

With the defeat of the Liberal government of Jean Charest, Bachand was replaced by Nicolas Marceau of the Parti Québécois as Minister of Finance. He was a candidate to succeed Jean Charest as Liberal Party leader but lost to Philippe Couillard on 17 March 2013.

On 26 August 2013, Bachand resigned his seat as MNA for Outremont.

== Electoral record ==
2012 Quebec general election
Party	Candidate	Votes	%	±%
Liberal	Raymond Bachand	10,949	41.52	-12.69
Parti Québécois	Roxanne Gendron	6,119	23.20	-2.03
Québec solidaire	Édith Laperle	4,751	18.02	+6.59
Coalition Avenir Québec	Claude Michaud	3,691	14.00	+11.04
Option nationale	Luc Séguin	451	1.71	
Parti Nul	Mathieu Marcil	243	0.92	
Quebec Citizens' Union	Jonathan Moffatt	120	0.46	
Coalition pour la Constituante	Olga Sharonova	47	0.18	
Total valid votes		26,371	99.08	
Total rejected ballots		245	0.92	
Turnout		26,616	68.21	
Electors on the lists		39,022		

2008 Quebec general election
Party	Candidate	Votes	%	±%
Liberal	Raymond Bachand	10,569	54.21	+7.18
Parti Québécois	Sophie Fréchette	6,119	25.23	+1.73
Québec solidaire	May Chiu	4,751	11.43	+2.30
Green	Maxime Simard	3,691	6.17	-4.63
Action démocratique	Christian Collard	451	2.96	-5.91
Total valid votes		19,498	98.96	
Total rejected ballots		204	1.04	
Turnout		19,702	48.49	
Electors on the lists		40,627		

2007 Quebec general election: Outremont
Party	Candidate	Votes	%	±%
Liberal	Raymond Bachand	11,861	47.03	
Parti Québécois	Salim Laaroussi	5,928	23.50	
Green	Luc Côté	2,725	10.80	–
Québec solidaire	Sujata Dey	2,303	9.13	
Action démocratique	Pierre Harvey	2,236	8.87	
Independent	Romain Angeles	101	0.40	
Marxist–Leninist	Yvon Breton	68	0.27	
Total valid votes		25,222	99.35	
Total rejected ballots		166	0.65	
Turnout		25,388	62.69	
Electors on the lists		40,498		
Source: Official Results, Le Directeur général des élections du Québec.

Quebec provincial by-election, December 12, 2005: Outremont
Party	Candidate	Votes	%	±%
Liberal	Raymond Bachand	8,172	48.79	
Parti Québécois	Farouk Karim	6,242	37.27	
UFP	Omar Aktouf	1,212	7.24	–
Green	Christopher Coggan	750	4.48	–
Action démocratique	Raya Mileva	338	2.02	
Independent	Régent Millette	35	0.21	
Total valid votes		16,749	100.00	
Rejected and declined votes		89		
Turnout		16,838	40.28	
Electors on the lists		41,799		

Political offices
Preceded by Monique Jérôme-Forget	Minister of Finance; 2009–2012	Succeeded by Nicolas Marceau
Preceded by Robert Dutil	Minister of Revenue; 2010–2012	Succeeded by Nicolas Marceau
Preceded by Claude Bechard	Minister of Economic Development, Innovation and Exports; 2006–2009	Succeeded by Clément Gignac
Preceded by Francoise Gauthier	Minister of Tourism; 2007–2008	Succeeded by Nicole Menard
