= Catherine Girard-Audet =

Canadian author, translator and blogger (born 1981)

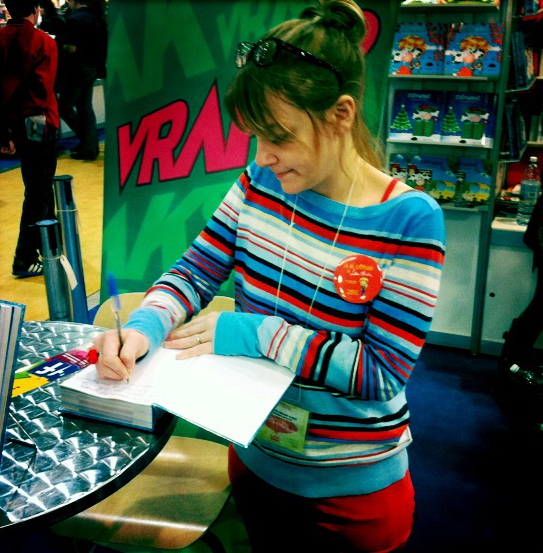
- Catherine Girard-Audet in 2011
- Born: Catherine Girard-Audet; 5 April 1981 (age 45); Quebec City, Quebec, Canada
- Occupation: Novelist
- Writing career
- Genre: Youth literature
- Notable work: The Complicated Life of Lea Oliver series
- Website: www.lesmalins.ca/auteurs/1-catherine-girard-audet.html

Catherine Girard-Audet (born April 5, 1981) is a Canadian author, translator and blogger.

== Biography ==
Girard-Audet graduated from McGill University in 2004 with a degree in French, English and Spanish literature. In 2006, she earned a master's in Translation Studies from Concordia University. Her father is Michel Audet, a Quebec politician who was Minister of Finance in the early 2000s.

Girard-Audet began her career in 2003 as translator of many children's book series such as SpongeBob SquarePants, Lizzie McGuire and Dora the Explorer. In 2008, she published the ABC des filles at Les Malins Publishing house, an informative dictionary designed for teenagers.

That same year, she started her own personal advice column where she has helped many young teenagers deal with their everyday life struggles. Catherine also wrote many other books addressed to teenagers such as a guide on babysitting, a nutrition book helping girls keep a healthy lifestyle and documentary books on puberty.

In 2011, she published the first volume of The Complicated Life of Lea Oliver. This book series follows the ups and downs of Lea Olivier's life through emails and text messages she sends to her friends. The story is set a while after Lea and her family move from their little village to the big city of Montreal. She will have to face the struggles of leaving her hometown and building a new life in another city where she doesn't know anybody.

The book series has had immense success all around the world and as many as 500,000 copies have been sold in the province of Quebec alone.

The Complicated life of Lea Olivier is now published in 23 countries and translated in 9 languages.
