= Jacques Daoust =

Canadian politician

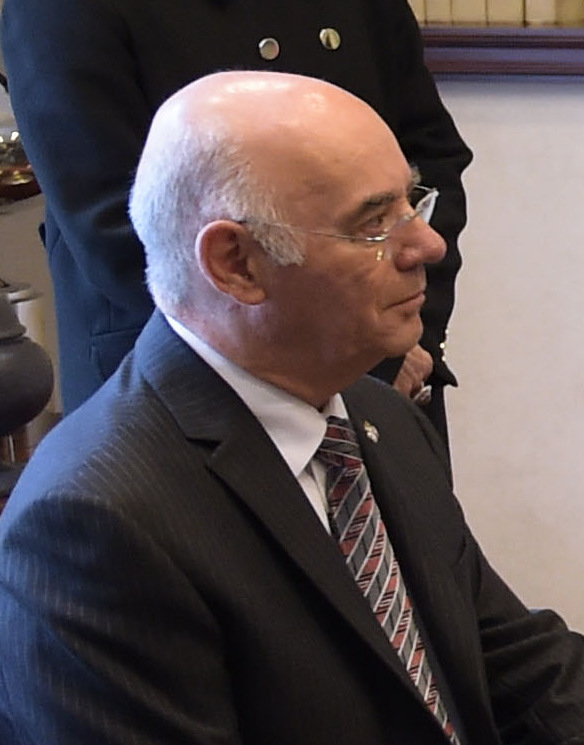

Member of the National Assembly of Quebec for Verdun
- In office April 7, 2014 – August 19, 2016
- Preceded by: Henri-François Gautrin
- Succeeded by: Isabelle Melançon

Personal details
- Born: February 17, 1948 Montreal, Quebec, Canada
- Died: August 3, 2017 (aged 69) Montreal, Quebec, Canada
- Party: Quebec Liberal Party

Jacques Daoust (February 17, 1948 – August 3, 2017) was a Canadian politician in Quebec, who was elected to the National Assembly of Quebec in the 2014 election. He represented the electoral district of Verdun as a member of the Quebec Liberal Party until his resignation in August 2016.

== Biography ==
Daoust obtained a bachelor of arts degree from the Université de Montréal, a bachelor of business administration from the École des hautes études commerciales de Montréal, and a master of business administration from Université Laval. Prior to his election to the legislature, Daoust was the executive director of Investissement Québec, the province's business development agency.

Daoust was appointed to cabinet as minister of the economy in April 2014. Under Daoust, the government aided Bombardier by investing $1 billion in the Quebec multinational to help it develop the CSeries aircraft, a decision that was criticized by the public. Daoust was also economy minister when Quebec hardware chain Rona was sold to American investors.

Daoust occupied that position until 2016. After a cabinet shuffle by Premier Philippe Couillard, Daoust became transport minister, when incumbent Robert Poëti returned to the back benches. During his time in the transport portfolio, Daoust presided over the penetration of Uber into Quebec and its negative impact on the province's taxi industry. That led to Daoust resigning in August 2016.

Daoust, a native of Verdun, Quebec, died after suffering a stroke. He was 69 years old.
