= Thierry St-Cyr =

Canadian politician (born 1997)

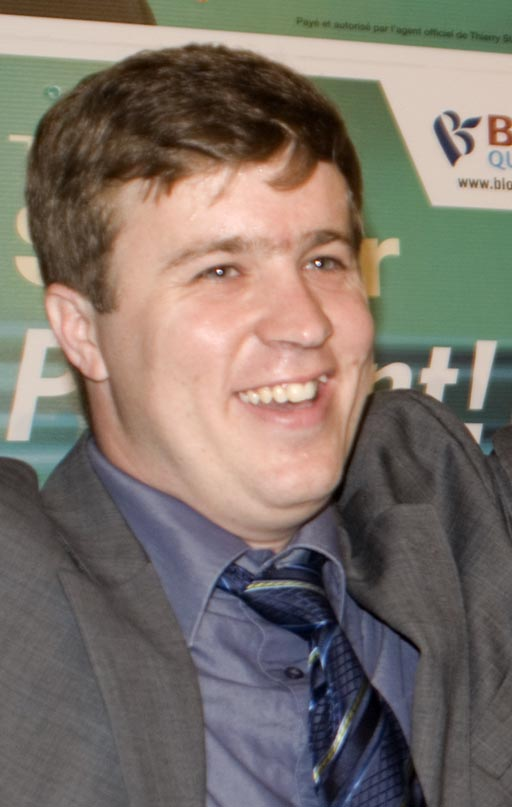

Member of the Canadian Parliament for Jeanne-Le Ber
- In office 2006–2011
- Preceded by: Liza Frulla
- Succeeded by: Tyrone Benskin

Personal details
- Born: November 7, 1977 (age 48) La Plaine, Quebec
- Party: Bloc Québécois; Parti Québécois
- Profession: engineer

Thierry St-Cyr (born November 7, 1977) is an engineer and former Bloc Québécois politician in Quebec, Canada. He served as the Member of Parliament for Jeanne-Le Ber from 2006 to 2011.

== Education and career background ==
Born in La Plaine, Quebec, he has a Bachelor's Degree in Computer Engineering at the Université de Sherbrooke and Université de technologie de Compiègne in France as well as an International Bachelor's in science and nature in Geneva.

In 1998 and 1999, worked as a management consultant with CGI in Quebec. He has also been a president and shareholder of an information technology company until 2000, when he started working for TETRA Technologies, Inc., an international oil and gas services company. In 2001, he was an associate professor of engineering at the Université de Sherbrooke. He was actively involved with the Université de Sherbrooke, serving as president, administrator and honorary member of its engineering student association, president of Le Collectif, the school's campus newspaper, and board member of the school's faculty of engineering in 2000 and 2001. He has worked as a quality and metric control at Motorola in Montreal from 2001 until 2006 when he entered politics.

== Political history ==
St-Cyr ran for the Bloc in the 2004 election in Jeanne-Le Ber, where he lost to Liza Frulla of the Liberal Party of Canada by 72 votes. He won the 2006 election.

He served as vice-chair of the standing committee on citizenship and immigration, and its subcommittee on agenda and procedure. Served as a member of the standing committee on finance and its subcommittee on Bill C-28. Served as an associate member of the standing committees on liaison, foreign affairs and international development, and human resources, social development and the status of persons with disabilities.

Thierry St-Cyr was re-elected for his second term in the 2008 Canadian election. However, in the 2011 election, he was defeated by the NDP candidate Tyrone Benskin.

He ran in the 2012 Quebec provincial election for the Parti Québécois in Verdun, losing to incumbent Henri-François Gautrin of the Quebec Liberal Party.

== Electoral record (incomplete) ==
2012 Quebec general election: Verdun
| Party | Candidate | Votes | % | ±% |
|---|---|---|---|---|
| Liberal | Henri-François Gautrin | 11,920 | 35.42 | -12.28 |
| Parti Québécois | Thierry St-Cyr | 11,373 | 33.80 | -1.54 |
| Coalition Avenir Québec | André Besner | 6,373 | 18.94 | +12.94* |
| Québec solidaire | Chantale Michaud | 2,449 | 7.28 | +2.12 |
| Green | Jeffrey Mackie | 825 | 2.45 | -2.17 |
| Option nationale | Marc-Antoine Daneau | 525 | 1.56 | – |
| Quebec Citizens' Union | Philippe Refghi | 127 | 0.38 | – |
| Marxist–Leninist | Eileen Studd | 58 | 0.17 | – |
| Total valid votes | | 33,650 | 98.86 | – |
| Total rejected ballots | | 389 | 1.14 | – |
| Turnout | | 34,039 | 71.37 | +20.75 |
| Electors on the lists | | 47,694 | – | – |

* Result compared to Action démocratique.

2011 Canadian federal election: Jeanne-Le Ber
| Party | Candidate | Votes | % | ±% | Expenditures |
|---|---|---|---|---|---|
| New Democratic | Tyrone Benskin | 23,293 | 44.66 | +28.96 | |
| Bloc Québécois | Thierry St-Cyr | 12,635 | 24.22 | -10.69 | |
| Liberal | Mark Bruneau | 10,054 | 19.28 | -12.98 | |
| Conservative | Pierre Lafontaine | 4,678 | 8.97 | -2.22 | |
| Green | Richard Noël | 1,377 | 2.64 | -2.14 | |
| Marxist–Leninist | Eileen Studd | 121 | 0.23 | – | |
| Total valid votes | | 52,158 | 100.00 | | |
| Total rejected ballots | | 637 | 1.21 | +0.01 | |
| Turnout | | 52,795 | 59.61 | +1.95 | |

2008 Canadian federal election: Jeanne-Le Ber
| Party | Candidate | Votes | % | ±% | Expenditures |
|---|---|---|---|---|---|
| Bloc Québécois | Thierry St-Cyr | 17,144 | 34.91 | | $88,605 |
| Liberal | Christian P. Feuillette | 15,841 | 32.26 | – | $58,773 |
| New Democratic | Daniel Breton | 7,708 | 15.70 | | $28,413 |
| Conservative | Daniel Beaudin | 5,494 | 11.19 | | $25,712 |
| Green | Véronik Sansoucy | 2,345 | 4.78 | – | $353 |
| Independent | Darryl Gray | 577 | 1.17 | | |
| Total valid votes | | 49,109 | 100.00 | | |
| Total rejected ballots | | 595 | | | |
| Turnout | | 49,704 | 57.66 | | |
| Electors on the lists | | 86,201 | | | |
Sources: Official Results, Elections Canada and Financial Returns, Elections Canada.

2006 Canadian federal election: Jeanne-Le Ber
| Party | Candidate | Votes | % | ±% | Expenditures |
|---|---|---|---|---|---|
| Bloc Québécois | Thierry St-Cyr | 20,213 | 40.22 | -0.71 | $60,248 |
| Liberal | Liza Frulla | 17,118 | 34.06 | -7.03 | $81,394 |
| Conservative | Pierre-Olivier Brunelle | 5,951 | 11.84 | +6.31 | $21,417 |
| New Democratic | Matthew McLauchlin | 4,621 | 9.19 | +2.28 | $9,536 |
| Green | Claude William Genest | 2,357 | 4.69 | +0.61 | $30 |
| Total valid votes | | 50,260 | 100.00 | – | – |
