= Nicole Ménard =

Canadian politician

Member of the National Assembly of Quebec for Laporte
- In office March 26, 2007 – August 28, 2022
- Preceded by: Michel Audet
- Succeeded by: Isabelle Poulet

Personal details
- Born: December 27, 1948 (age 77) Saint-Constant, Quebec
- Party: Quebec Liberal Party
- Spouse: Réjean Lefebvre
- Profession: banking and finance

Nicole Ménard (born December 27, 1948, in Saint-Constant, Quebec) is a Quebec politician. She was the Quebec Liberal Party member of the National Assembly of Quebec for the riding of Laporte in the Montérégie region from 2007 to 2022, serving as Minister of Tourism when her party was in power.

== Biography ==
She studied at the École des hautes études commerciales de Montréal and the Centre international de recherches et d'études en management in business administration and strategic management before taking an Advanced Executive Program at Northwestern University in Chicago.

Menard has worked at the Bank of Montreal since 1967 and was the director of the bank's regional division in Montreal North. She has been the vice-president of the bank since 1995. She has headed several foundations and received several awards for her work.

Menard was elected as MNA member for Laporte replacing former Finance Minister Michel Audet, who did not seek a re-election in the 2007. She was named parliamentary secretary to the Minister of Economic Development, Innovation and Export Trade, portfolios currently held by Raymond Bachand. She was also parliamentary secretary to the Minister of Tourism and, following the 2008 election, she was promoted to Bachand's position in the Cabinet.

Political offices
Preceded by Raymond Bachand	Minister of Tourism; 2008–2012	Succeeded by Pascal Bérubé
