= Fred Beauchemin =

Canadian politician

Frédéric Beauchemin MNA
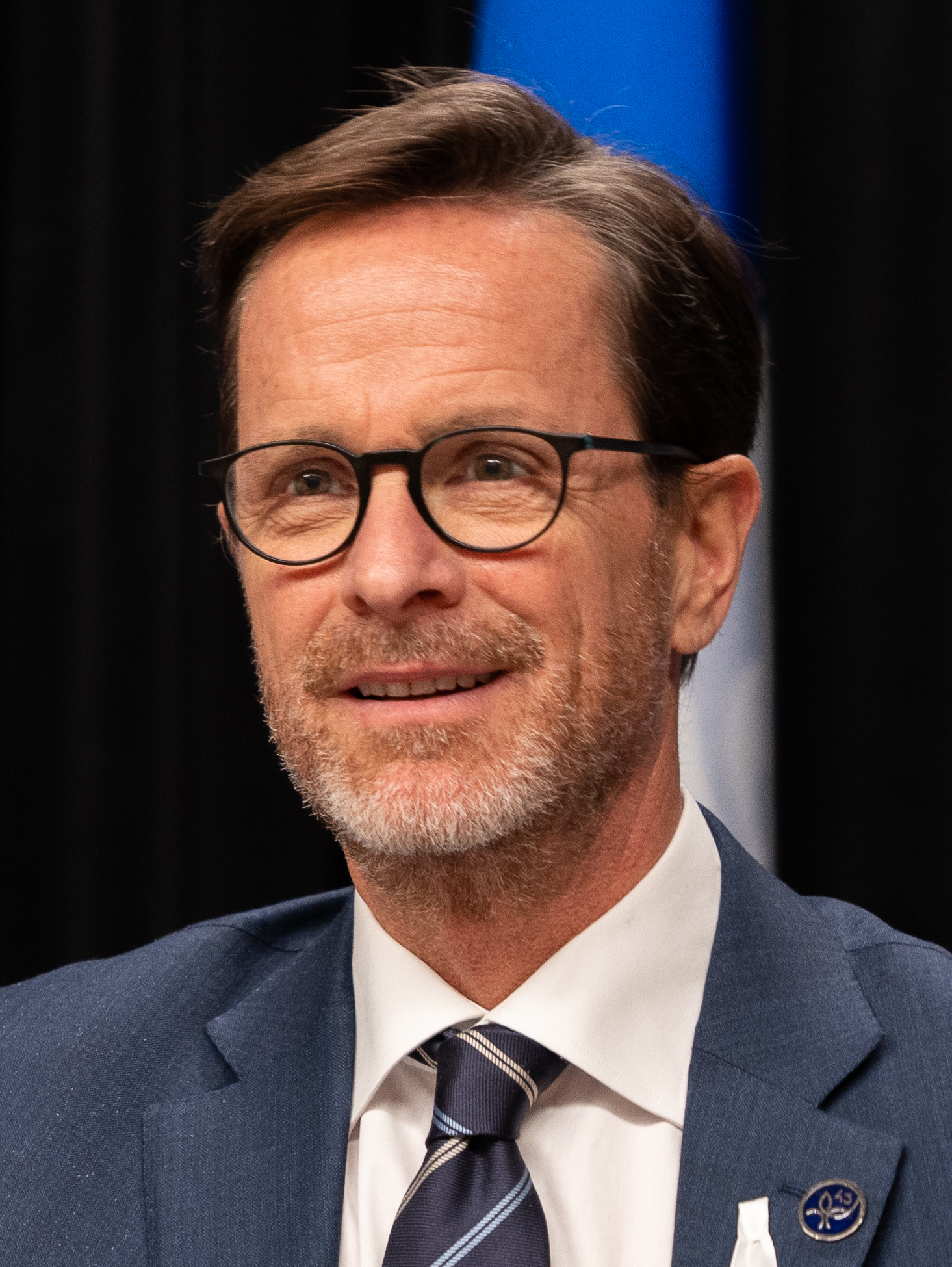
- Beauchemin in 2022

Member of the National Assembly for Brome-Missisquoi
- Incumbent
- Assumed office October 5, 2026
- Preceded by: Isabelle Charest

Member of the National Assembly for Marguerite-Bourgeoys
- In office October 3, 2022 – October 5, 2026
- Preceded by: Hélène David
- Succeeded by: Michel Leblanc

Personal details
- Born: 1965 (age 60–61) Montreal, Quebec, Canada
- Party: Liberal (provincial)
- Other political affiliations: Independent (2023); Liberal (federal)

Frédéric Beauchemin is a Canadian politician from the Quebec Liberal Party (PLQ). He was elected to the National Assembly of Quebec in the 2022 Quebec general election in the riding of Marguerite-Bourgeoys. He was elected in the 2026 Quebec general election in Brome-Missisquoi.

== Education ==
Beauchemin did his post-secondary studies at Collège Jean de Brébeuf, where he obtained a DEC in Pure Sciences (1984). Later, he acquired a bachelor of commerce in Finance from HEC Montreal (1987), then an MBA from McGill University in 1994.

== Early career ==
He began his professional career in banking. In 1996 he was appointed managing director of Scotiabank, a position he held until 2019. In 2007 he became head of credit markets to finally completing his professional career as head of capital markets from 2010 to 2019.

Beauchemin was notably a member of the boards of directors for the foundations of Père Sablon, des petits rois, Marie-Vincent and the Institut du cancer de Montréal.

== Political career ==
Since October 3, 2022, Beauchemin has been elected MNA for Marguerite-Bourgeoys for the Quebec Liberal Party. On March 20, 2026, he was announced as the Quebec Liberal candidate in Brome-Missisquoi.

=== Office at the National Assembly ===
Beauchemin is currently serving as:

- Vice-president of the Committee on Economy and Labor
- Official Opposition Critic for the Economy
- Official Opposition Critic for Innovation
- Official Opposition Critic for Finance
- Official Opposition Critic for the Estrie Region
- Official Opposition Critic for the Saguenay–Lac-Saint-Jean Region

=== Harassment allegations ===
On October 5, 2023, Beauchemin and three of his staffers received a complaint for psychological harassment by the president of the Liberal Party of Quebec Youth Commission. It was alleged that the members of his team had harassed, intimidated and threatened her, all the while instrumentalizing the Youth Commission to promote his forthcoming campaign for the leadership of the party with the inaction of Beauchemin regarding the harassment. On October 7, he was removed from the party's caucus, but was readmitted in December 2023.

=== ChatGPT ===
On April 6, 2023, he asked the very first question written entirely by artificial intelligence in the National Assembly. It was addressed to innovation Minister, Pierre Fitzgibbon, and focused on the impacts and risks of using this same intelligence.

“I would like to know how the Government of Quebec intends to support this transition to an increasingly digital and automated economy, while ensuring the protection of jobs and the competitiveness of our province. Can you tell us what concrete measures your ministry plans to put in place to encourage the use of artificial intelligence and businesses and industries, while ensuring the protection of workers? Thank you in advance for your answer. And by the way, this question was entirely prepared by ChatGPT”.

=== Submission of bill ===
In March 2023, Beauchemin tabled Bill 396: An Act to amend the Debt Reduction Act and establish the Generations Fund to expect an attainment of capitalization of $100 billion in order to ensure generations a green and prosperous future.

== Personal life ==
Since 2019, Beauchemin lives in the Brome-Missisquoi region.

== Electoral record ==
2026 Quebec general election: Brome-Missisquoi
** Preliminary results — Not yet official **
| Party | Candidate | Votes | % | ±% |
|---|---|---|---|---|
| Liberal | Frédéric Beauchemin | 13,007 | 32.47 | +19.21 |
| Parti Québécois | Patrick Melchior | 10,889 | 27.19 | +15.61 |
| Conservative | David Alarie | 6,445 | 16.09 | +5.64 |
| Coalition Avenir Québec | Manuela Goya | 5,249 | 13.11 | –32.02 |
| Québec solidaire | Michelle Corcos | 3,585 | 8.95 | –7.01 |
| Parti nul | Frédérique Marseille | 355 | 0.89 | N/A |
| Canadian | Michelle Julien | 271 | 0.68 | –0.75 |
| Présence | Ganaëlle Roy | 252 | 0.63 | N/A |
| Total valid votes | | 40,053 | 98.80 | +0.02 |
| Total rejected ballots | | 486 | 1.20 | –0.02 |
| Turnout | | 40,539 | 70.43 | +2.44 |
| Electors on the lists | | 57,556 | | |
| Liberal notional gain from Coalition Avenir Québec | | Swing | | +1.80 |
Source: Élections Québec

2022 Quebec general election: Marguerite-Bourgeoys
| Party | Candidate | Votes | % | ±% |
|---|---|---|---|---|
| Liberal | Fred Beauchemin | 12,635 | 44.78 | -8.61 |
| Coalition Avenir Québec | Vicky Michaud | 6,533 | 23.15 | -0.33 |
| Conservative | Aleksa Drakul | 3,103 | 11.00 | – |
| Québec solidaire | Angélique Soleil Lavoie | 2,898 | 10.27 | -0.49 |
| Parti Québécois | Suzanne Tremblay | 1,966 | 6.97 | -1.48 |
| Bloc Montreal | Keeton Clarke | 549 | 1.95 | – |
| Green | Carole Thériault | 409 | 1.45 | -0.90 |
| Climat Québec | Serge Bellemare | 123 | 0.44 | – |
| Total valid votes | | 28,216 | 98.66 | – |
| Total rejected ballots | | 382 | 1.34 | – |
| Turnout | | 28,598 | 54.71 | -0.09 |
| Electors on the lists | | 52,274 | – | – |

2019 Canadian federal election: Terrebonne
| Party | Candidate | Votes | % | ±% | Expenditures |
|---|---|---|---|---|---|
| Bloc Québécois | Michel Boudrias | 31,029 | 50.59 | +17.58 | $20,129.32 |
| Liberal | Frédéric Beauchemin | 17,944 | 29.26 | +1.26 | none listed |
| Conservative | France Gagnon | 4,640 | 7.57 | -3.78 | $1,869.33 |
| New Democratic | Maxime Beaudoin | 4,627 | 7.54 | -18.07 | $0.33 |
| Green | Réjean Monette | 2,277 | 3.71 | +1.97 | none listed |
| People's | Jeffrey Barnes | 399 | 0.65 | | none listed |
| Rhinoceros | Paul Vézina | 260 | 0.42 | | $0.00 |
| Independent | Jade Hébert | 159 | 0.26 | | $0.00 |
| Total valid votes/expense limit | | 61,335 | 97.95 | | |
| Total rejected ballots | | 1,282 | 2.05 | -0.06 | |
| Turnout | | 62,617 | 70.31 | -0.15 | |
| Eligible voters | | 89,062 | | | |
| Bloc Québécois hold | | Swing | | +8.16 | |
Source: Elections Canada
