= Isabelle Poulet =

Canadian politician

Member of the National Assembly of Quebec for Laporte
- In office October 3, 2022 – August 27, 2026
- Preceded by: Nicole Ménard
- Succeeded by: David Bowles

Personal details
- Born: 1968 Montreal
- Party: Independent (since 2025)
- Other political affiliations: Coalition Avenir Québec (until 2025)

Isabelle Poulet is a Canadian politician, who was elected to the National Assembly of Quebec in the 2022 Quebec general election. She represented the riding of Laporte and was a member of the Coalition Avenir Québec.

== Political career ==
Poulet was previously a municipal councillor in Sainte-Julie, Quebec from 2005 to 2022.

In November 2025, she was expelled from caucus; according to François Legault and Pablo Rodriguez, she tried to join the Quebec Liberal Party. She then sat as an independent. She did not seek re-election in the 2026 general election.

== Electoral record ==
2022 Quebec general election: Laporte
Party	Candidate	Votes	%	±%
Coalition Avenir Québec	Isabelle Poulet	10,361	30.76	+2.20
Liberal	Mathieu Gratton	9,707	28.82	-6.80
Québec solidaire	Claude Lefrançois	5,968	17.72	+0.62
Parti Québécois	Soledad Orihuela-Bouchard	4,108	12.19	-1.03
Conservative	Evelyne Latreille	2,488	7.39	+6.03
Green	Jean-Philippe Charest	497	1.48	-1.31
Canadian	Herby Fremont	445	1.32	
Climat Québec	Ian Parent	113	0.34	
Total valid votes		33,687	98.84	
Total rejected ballots		394	1.16	-0.36
Turnout		34,081	64.04	-2.25
Electors on the lists		53,217		
Coalition Avenir Québec gain from Liberal		Swing		+4.50
