= David Bowles (Canadian politician) =

Quebec politician

David Bowles MNA

Member of the National Assembly for Pierre-Laporte
- Incumbent
- Assumed office October 5, 2026
- Preceded by: Isabelle Poulet

Personal details
- Party: Quebec Liberal Party
- Website: plq.org/en/equipe/david-bowles/

David Bowles is a Quebec politician who was the elected to the National Assembly of Quebec for Pierre-Laporte in the 2026 Quebec general election as a member of the Quebec Liberal Party. He was director general of Charles-Lemoyne College.

== Electoral record ==
2026 Quebec general election: Pierre-Laporte
** Preliminary results — Not yet official **
Party	Candidate	Votes	%	±%
Liberal	David Bowles	14,535	42.89	
Parti Québécois	Anne-Sophie Maguire Armand	7,367	21.74	
Québec solidaire	Claude Lefrançois	5,003	14.76	
Coalition Avenir Québec	Mélanie Martin	3,160	9.32	
Conservative	Mi Jie	3,110	9.18	
Green	Yahia Ghzala	311	0.92	
Canadian	Michael Douris	197	0.58	
Climat Québec	Stéphane Bilodeau	166	0.49	
Équipe Autonomiste	Florent Portron	43	0.13	
Total valid votes				
Total rejected ballots				
Turnout			64.53	
Electors on the lists			–	–
Liberal gain from Coalition Avenir Québec		Swing		+
Source: Élections Québec
