= Charles-Aimé Kirkland =

Canadian politician

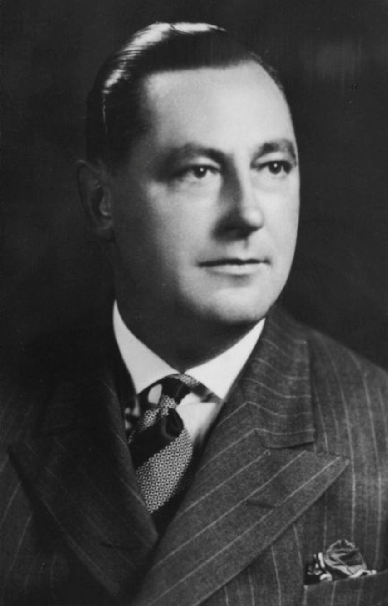

Member of the Legislative Assembly of Quebec for Jacques-Cartier
- In office 1939–1961
- Preceded by: Anatole Carignan
- Succeeded by: Marie-Claire Kirkland

Personal details
- Born: November 16, 1896 Saint-Constant, Quebec
- Died: August 9, 1961 (aged 64) Montreal, Quebec
- Party: Liberal
- Children: Marie-Claire Kirkland
- Education: Laval University, Harvard School of Medicine
- Occupation: medical doctor

Charles-Aimé Kirkland (November 16, 1896 – August 9, 1961) was a Canadian politician serving as the Liberal member of the National Assembly of Quebec in the Jacques-Cartier provincial district from 1939 to his death in 1961.

Kirkland was the son of Joseph Kirkland, a Canadian Pacific employee, and Rosalie Lanctôt.

Kirkland served during World War I with the Royal Canadian Engineers, then studied medicine at Laval and Harvard.

The Town of Kirkland is named in his honour, as well as the now-closed Charles A. Kirkland Elementary School in Roxboro, Quebec.

He was the father of Quebec MNA Marie-Claire Kirkland.
