= Alejandra Zaga Mendez =

Canadian politician

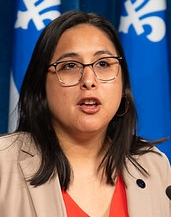
- Mendez in 2024

Member of the National Assembly of Quebec for Verdun
- In office 3 October, 2022 – 27 August, 2026
- Preceded by: Isabelle Melançon
- Succeeded by: Antoine Dionne Charest

President of Québec solidaire
- In office 21 November, 2021 – 3 October, 2022
- Preceded by: Nika Deslauriers
- Succeeded by: Nicolas Chatel-Launay

Personal details
- Born: 1988 (age 37–38) Lima, Peru
- Party: Québec solidaire
- Education: Université du Québec en Outaouais; McGill University

Alejandra Zaga Mendez (born 1988) is a Canadian politician, who served in the National Assembly of Quebec from 2022 to 2026. She represented the riding of Verdun as a member of Québec solidaire.

Following her election to the National Assembly in 2022, she was chosen to be the opposition critic for Environment, Wildlife and Parks; Natural Resources and Forests; Agriculture, Fisheries and Food; Youth; and Relations with English-speaking Quebecers.

== Early life ==
Born in Lima, Peru in 1988, Zaga Mendez emigrated to Canada when she was fourteen. She first became involved in politics as a result of the 2008 shooting of Fredy Villanueva, and participated in the 2012 Quebec student protests on the campus of McGill University.

She has a master's degree in natural resource management from McGill University and a doctorate in sustainable development from Université du Québec en Outaouais.

== Electoral record ==
2026 Quebec general election: Verdun
** Preliminary results — Not yet official **
| Party | Candidate | Votes | % | ±% |
|---|---|---|---|---|
| Liberal | Antoine Dionne-Charest | 12,373 | 37.77 | |
| Québec solidaire | Alejandra Zaga Mendez | 11,663 | 35.60 | |
| Parti Québécois | Elena Kozynchenko | 4,528 | 13.82 | |
| Conservative | Lucien Koty | 1,952 | 5.96 | |
| Coalition Avenir Québec | Roseline Olory | 1,680 | 5.13 | |
| Green | Victoria Shahsavar-Arshad | 200 | 0.61 | |
| Canadian | Abdur Rashid | 93 | 0.28 | |
| Bloc Pot | Max Richard | 57 | 0.17 | |
| Communist | Manuel Johnson | 53 | 0.16 | |
| Québec innovant | Marc-André Ouellette | 51 | 0.16 | |
| Climat Québec | Matthieu Deutté Brien | 42 | 0.13 | |
| Independent | Marina Cabrera | 40 | 0.12 | |
| Marxist–Leninist | Normand Chouinard | 27 | 0.08 | |
| Total valid votes | | | | |
| Total rejected ballots | | | | |
| Turnout | | | 66.19 | |
| Liberal hold | | Swing | | |
Source: Élections Québec

2022 Quebec general election: Verdun
| Party | Candidate | Votes | % | ±% |
|---|---|---|---|---|
| Québec solidaire | Alejandra Zaga Mendez | 9,562 | 30.75 | +6.80 |
| Liberal | Isabelle Melançon | 9,101 | 29.27 | -6.24 |
| Coalition Avenir Québec | Véronique Tremblay | 7,150 | 23.00 | +2.62 |
| Parti Québécois | Claudia Valdivia | 2,591 | 8.33 | -4.29 |
| Conservative | Lucien Koty | 1,664 | 5.35 | +4.65 |
| Green | Jannie Pellerin | 542 | 1.74 | -1.97 |
| Canadian | Scott Kilbride | 301 | 0.97 | – |
| Parti nul | Marc-André Milette | 65 | 0.21 | -0.28 |
| Climat Québec | Alexandre Desmarais | 61 | 0.20 | – |
| Marxist–Leninist | Fernand Deschamps | 30 | 0.10 | +0.01 |
| Famille et communautés | Alain Rioux | 26 | 0.08 | – |
| Total valid votes | | 31,093 | 99.03 | – |
| Total rejected ballots | | 303 | 0.97 | -0.16 |
| Turnout | | 31,396 | 64.52 | +1.34 |
| Electors on the lists | | 48,656 | – | – |
| Québec solidaire gain from Liberal | | Swing | | +6.52 |

2018 Quebec general election: Bourassa-Sauvé
| Party | Candidate | Votes | % | ±% |
|---|---|---|---|---|
| Liberal | Paule Robitaille | 11,456 | 46.16 | -14.32 |
| Coalition Avenir Québec | Julie Séide | 5,826 | 23.48 | +11.24 |
| Québec solidaire | Alejandra Zaga Mendez | 3,469 | 13.98 | +8.08 |
| Parti Québécois | Karine Gauvin | 2,640 | 10.64 | -8.43 |
| Green | Karina Barros | 433 | 1.74 | +0.55 |
| Conservative | Michel Boissonneault | 363 | 1.46 | – |
| New Democratic | Abed Louis | 219 | 0.88 | – |
| Bloc Pot | Jean-François Brunet | 177 | 0.71 | -0.01 |
| CINQ | Sabrinel Laouadi | 142 | 0.57 | – |
| Independent | Jean Marie Floriant Ndzana | 92 | 0.37 | – |
| Total valid votes | | 24,817 | 97.39 | |
| Total rejected ballots | | 666 | 2.61 | |
| Turnout | | 25,483 | 52.44 | -10.69 |
| Eligible voters | | 48,592 | | |
| Liberal hold | | Swing | | -12.78 |
Source(s) "Rapport des résultats officiels du scrutin". Élections Québec.
