= Antoine Dionne Charest =

Canadian politician

Antoine Dionne Charest MNA

Member of the National Assembly for Verdun
- Incumbent
- Assumed office October 5, 2026
- Preceded by: Alejandra Zaga Mendez

Personal details
- Party: Liberal
- Parent: Jean Charest (father)

Antoine Dionne Charest is a member of the Quebec Liberal Party elected for the riding of Verdun.

Charest is the son of former Quebec Premier Jean Charest.

== Electoral record ==
2026 Quebec general election: Verdun
** Preliminary results — Not yet official **
Party	Candidate	Votes	%	±%
Liberal	Antoine Dionne-Charest	12,373	37.77	
Québec solidaire	Alejandra Zaga Mendez	11,663	35.60	
Parti Québécois	Elena Kozynchenko	4,528	13.82	
Conservative	Lucien Koty	1,952	5.96	
Coalition Avenir Québec	Roseline Olory	1,680	5.13	
Green	Victoria Shahsavar-Arshad	200	0.61	
Canadian	Abdur Rashid	93	0.28	
Bloc Pot	Max Richard	57	0.17	
Communist	Manuel Johnson	53	0.16	
Québec innovant	Marc-André Ouellette	51	0.16	
Climat Québec	Matthieu Deutté Brien	42	0.13	
Independent	Marina Cabrera	40	0.12	
Marxist–Leninist	Normand Chouinard	27	0.08	
Total valid votes				
Total rejected ballots				
Turnout			66.19	
Liberal hold		Swing		
Source: Élections Québec
