= Verdun (provincial electoral district) =

Provincial electoral district in Quebec, Canada

Coordinates: 45.46°N 73.56°W

Quebec electoral district
- Location in Montreal

Provincial electoral district
- Legislature: National Assembly of Quebec
MNA
Antoine Dionne-Charest
Liberal
- District created: 1965
- First contested: 1966
- Last contested: 2026

Demographics
- Population (2011): 66,155
- Electors (2014): 48,594
- Area (km²): 22.6
- Pop. density (per km²): 2,927.2
- Census division: Montreal (part)
- Census subdivision: Montreal (part)

Verdun (French: [vɛʁdœ̃], Quebec French: [vaɛ̯ʁdœ̃˞]) is a provincial electoral district in the Montreal region of Quebec, Canada, that elects members to the National Assembly of Quebec. Its territory corresponds exactly to the borough of Verdun of the city of Montreal.

It was created for the 1966 election from Montréal-Verdun electoral district.

In the change from the 2001 to the 2011 electoral map, its territory was unchanged.

== Members of the Legislative Assembly / National Assembly ==
This riding has elected the following members of the National Assembly:

Legislature	Years	Member	Party
Riding created from Montréal-Verdun
28th	1966–1970	Claude Wagner	Liberal
29th	1970–1973	Lucien Caron	Liberal
30th	1973–1976	Lucien Caron	Liberal
31st	1976–1981	Lucien Caron	Liberal
32nd	1981–1985	Lucien Caron	Liberal
33rd	1985–1989	Paul Gobeil	Liberal
34th	1989–1994	Henri-François Gautrin	Liberal
35th	1994–1998	Henri-François Gautrin	Liberal
36th	1998–2003	Henri-François Gautrin	Liberal
37th	2003–2007	Henri-François Gautrin	Liberal
38th	2007–2008	Henri-François Gautrin	Liberal
39th	2008–2012	Henri-François Gautrin	Liberal
40th	2012–2014	Henri-François Gautrin	Liberal
41st	2014–2016	Jacques Daoust	Liberal
41st	2016–2018	Isabelle Melançon	Liberal
42nd	2018–2022	Isabelle Melançon	Liberal
43rd	2022–2026	Alejandra Zaga Mendez	Québec solidaire
44th	2026–Present	Antoine Dionne Charest	Liberal

== Election results ==
2026 Quebec general election
** Preliminary results — Not yet official **
Party	Candidate	Votes	%	±%
Liberal	Antoine Dionne-Charest	12,373	37.77	
Québec solidaire	Alejandra Zaga Mendez	11,663	35.60	
Parti Québécois	Elena Kozynchenko	4,528	13.82	
Conservative	Lucien Koty	1,952	5.96	
Coalition Avenir Québec	Roseline Olory	1,680	5.13	
Green	Victoria Shahsavar-Arshad	200	0.61	
Canadian	Abdur Rashid	93	0.28	
Bloc Pot	Max Richard	57	0.17	
Communist	Manuel Johnson	53	0.16	
Québec innovant	Marc-André Ouellette	51	0.16	
Climat Québec	Matthieu Deutté Brien	42	0.13	
Independent	Marina Cabrera	40	0.12	
Marxist–Leninist	Normand Chouinard	27	0.08	
Total valid votes				
Total rejected ballots				
Turnout			66.19	
Liberal hold		Swing		
Source: Élections Québec

2022 Quebec general election
Party	Candidate	Votes	%	±%
Québec solidaire	Alejandra Zaga Mendez	9,562	30.75	+6.80
Liberal	Isabelle Melançon	9,101	29.27	-6.24
Coalition Avenir Québec	Véronique Tremblay	7,150	23.00	+2.62
Parti Québécois	Claudia Valdivia	2,591	8.33	-4.29
Conservative	Lucien Koty	1,664	5.35	+4.65
Green	Jannie Pellerin	542	1.74	-1.97
Canadian	Scott Kilbride	301	0.97	–
Parti nul	Marc-André Milette	65	0.21	-0.28
Climat Québec	Alexandre Desmarais	61	0.20	–
Marxist–Leninist	Fernand Deschamps	30	0.10	+0.01
Famille et communautés	Alain Rioux	26	0.08	–
Total valid votes		31,093	99.03	–
Total rejected ballots		303	0.97	-0.16
Turnout		31,396	64.52	+1.34
Electors on the lists		48,656	–	–
Québec solidaire gain from Liberal		Swing		+6.52

2018 Quebec general election
Party	Candidate	Votes	%	±%
Liberal	Isabelle Melançon	11,054	35.51	-0.10
Québec solidaire	Vanessa Roy	7,457	23.95	+5.37
Coalition Avenir Québec	Nicole Leduc	6,343	20.38	+7.65
Parti Québécois	Constantin Fortier	3,929	12.62	-14.53
Green	Alex Tyrrell	1,157	3.72	-0.56
New Democratic	Raphaël Fortin	717	2.30	–
Conservative	Yedidya-Eitan Moryoussef	217	0.70	+0.05
Parti nul	Marc-André Milette	151	0.49	–
Bloc Pot	Hugo Richard	76	0.24	–
Marxist–Leninist	Eileen Studd	29	0.09	–
Total valid votes		31130	98.88	
Total rejected ballots		354	1.12	
Turnout		31,484	63.19	
Eligible voters		49,826		
Liberal hold		Swing		-2.74
Source(s) "Rapport des résultats officiels du scrutin". Élections Québec.

Quebec provincial by-election, 5 December 2016
Party	Candidate	Votes	%	±%
Liberal	Isabelle Melançon	5,116	35.61	-14.98
Parti Québécois	Richard Langlais	3,900	27.15	+2.78
Québec solidaire	Véronique Martineau	2,669	18.58	+8.93
Coalition Avenir Québec	Ginette Marotte	1,829	12.73	+0.50
Green	David Cox	615	4.28	+2.18
Option nationale	Frédéric Dénommé	115	0.80	+0.33
Conservative	David Girard	94	0.65	–
Équipe Autonomiste	Sébastien Poirier	27	0.19	–
Total valid votes		14,365	100.00	–
Total rejected ballots		138	0.95	-0.24
Turnout		14,503	29.15	-41.54
Electors on the lists		49,758	–	–
Liberal hold		Swing		-8.88

2014 Quebec general election
Party	Candidate	Votes	%	±%
Liberal	Jacques Daoust	17,172	50.59	+15.17
Parti Québécois	Lorraine Pintal	8,271	24.37	-9.43
Coalition Avenir Québec	Benoit Richer	4,151	12.23	-6.71
Québec solidaire	Rosa Pires	3,277	9.65	+2.38
Green	Antonin Bergeron-Bossé	713	2.10	-0.35
Option nationale	Julien Longchamp	160	0.47	-1.09
Bloc Pot	Raynald St-Onge	157	0.46	–
Marxist–Leninist	Eileen Studd	42	0.12	-0.05
Total valid votes		33,943	98.81	–
Total rejected ballots		409	1.19	+0.05
Turnout		34,352	70.69	-0.68
Electors on the lists		48,594	–	–
Liberal hold		Swing		+12.30

2012 Quebec general election
Party	Candidate	Votes	%	±%
Liberal	Henri-François Gautrin	11,920	35.42	-12.28
Parti Québécois	Thierry St-Cyr	11,373	33.80	-1.54
Coalition Avenir Québec	André Besner	6,373	18.94	+12.94*
Québec solidaire	Chantale Michaud	2,449	7.28	+2.11
Green	Jeffrey Mackie	825	2.45	-2.17
Option nationale	Marc-Antoine Daneau	525	1.56	–
Quebec Citizens' Union	Philippe Refghi	127	0.38	–
Marxist–Leninist	Eileen Studd	58	0.17	–
Total valid votes		33,650	98.86	–
Total rejected ballots		389	1.14	-0.16
Turnout		34,039	71.37	+20.75
Electors on the lists		47,694	–	–
Liberal hold		Swing		-5.37

* Result compared to Action démocratique

2008 Quebec general election
Party	Candidate	Votes	%	±%
Liberal	Henri-François Gautrin	11,223	47.70	+6.76
Parti Québécois	Richard Langlais	8,314	35.34	+6.19
Action démocratique	Moscou Côté	1,411	6.00	-11.58
Québec solidaire	Chantale Michaud	1,215	5.16	+0.37
Green	Sébastien Beausoleil	1,087	4.62	-1.65
Independent	Sylvie R. Tremblay	216	0.92	–
Independent	Robert Lindblad	61	0.26	-0.01
Total valid votes		23,527	98.70	–
Total rejected ballots		310	1.30	+0.30
Turnout		23,837	50.62	-13.83
Electors on the lists		47,089	–	–
Liberal hold		Swing		+0.28

2007 Quebec general election
Party	Candidate	Votes	%	±%
Liberal	Henri-François Gautrin	12,204	40.94	-11.58
Parti Québécois	Richard Langlais	8,688	29.15	-1.23
Action démocratique	Sylvie Tremblay	5,239	17.58	+6.27
Green	Pierre-Yves McSween	1,868	6.27	+3.99
Québec solidaire	David Fennario	1,430	4.80	+3.52*
Christian Democracy	Gilles Noël	118	0.40	+0.04
Bloc Pot	Sala Samghour	106	0.36	-0.88
Independent	Robert Lindblad	80	0.27	+0.08
Marxist–Leninist	Normand Fournier	74	0.25	-0.01
Total valid votes		29,807	99.00	–
Total rejected ballots		302	1.00	-0.33
Turnout		30,109	64.45	+1.44
Electors on the lists		46,714	–	–
Liberal hold		Swing		-5.18

* Result compared to UFP

2003 Quebec general election
Party	Candidate	Votes	%	±%
Liberal	Henri-François Gautrin	15,185	52.52	-0.23
Parti Québécois	Denis Martel	8,782	30.38	-4.92
Action démocratique	Sébastien Guérin	3,269	11.31	+1.92
Green	Claude Genest	658	2.28	–
UFP	Pascal Durand	368	1.27	+0.82*
Bloc Pot	Vincent Aubry	357	1.23	+0.62
Christian Democracy	Gilles Noël	104	0.36	+0.16
Marxist–Leninist	Normand Chouinard	71	0.25	–
Equality	Bernard King	63	0.22	-0.30
Independent	Robert Lindblad	54	0.19	–
Total valid votes		28,911	98.67	–
Total rejected ballots		391	1.33	+0.21
Turnout		29,302	63.01	-12.69
Electors on the lists		46,502	–	–
Liberal hold		Swing		+2.35

* Result compared to PDS

1998 Quebec general election
Party	Candidate	Votes	%	±%
Liberal	Henri-François Gautrin	17,441	52.76	-1.81
Parti Québécois	Yves Bernard	11,670	35.30	-0.19
Action démocratique	Pascale Perron	3,105	9.39	+2.49
Bloc Pot	Roman Pokorski	204	0.62	–
Natural law	Gilles Bigras	204	0.61	+0.12
Equality	Larry Vitas	171	0.52	–
Socialist Democracy	Daniel Pharand	151	0.46	-0.64*
Independent	Gilles Noël	66	0.20	–
Communist	Luz Nelly Valencia	51	0.15	–
Total valid votes		33,060	98.87	–
Total rejected ballots		377	1.13	-0.79
Turnout		33,437	75.70	-6.19
Electors on the lists		44,169	–	–
Liberal hold		Swing		-0.81

* Result compared to NDP

1995 Quebec referendum
Side	Votes	%
Non	24,062	59.66
Oui	16,269	40.34

1994 Quebec general election
Party	Candidate	Votes	%	±%
Liberal	Henri-François Gautrin	18,392	54.27	+15.99
Parti Québécois	Richard B. Holden	11,963	35.49	+3.27
Action démocratique	Alain Magnan	2,327	6.90	–
New Democratic	Daniel Pharand	368	1.09	-0.71
CANADA!	Deepak Massand	315	0.93	–
Natural law	Nicola Masucci	167	0.50	–
Sovereignty	Frédéric Richard	87	0.26	–
Development	Aimé Pinette	87	0.26	–
Total valid votes		33,706	98.08	–
Total rejected ballots		660	1.92	
Turnout		33,366	81.89	
Electors on the lists		41,967	–	–

1992 Charlottetown Accord referendum
Side	Votes	%
Oui	12,770	53.66
Non	11,026	46.34

1989 Quebec general election
Party	Candidate	Votes	%	±%
Liberal	Henri-François Gautrin	8,295	38.58	−25.69
Parti Québécois	Maurice Roch	6,928	32.22	+2.35
Equality	Roger Mercure	4,857	22.59	–
Green	Andrew Ferguson	664	3.09	–
New Democratic	Jean-François Moisan	387	1.80	−1.05
Workers	Raymond Lemay	266	1.24	–
Marxist–Leninist	Claude Brunelle	106	0.49	–
Total valid votes		21,503	96.97	–
Rejected and declined votes		673	3.03	–
Turnout		22,176	75.27	+1.46
Electors on the lists		29,461	–	–
Source: Official Results, Le Directeur général des élections du Québec.

1985 Quebec general election
Party	Candidate	Votes	%	±%
Liberal	Paul Gobeil	14,860	64.27	+2.87
Parti Québécois	Paul Asselin	6,906	29.87	-6.08
New Democratic	Richard Proulx	659	2.85	–
Progressive Conservative	Jacques Leroux	216	0.93	–
Parti indépendantiste	Guy Sauvé	183	0.79	–
Union Nationale	Marie Quintal-Mallette	114	0.49	-0.97
Humanist	Laura Whelton	87	0.38	–
Christian Socialist	Éric Charmettant	50	0.22	–
Commonwealth of Canada	Michel Destroismaisons	47	0.20	–
Total valid votes		23,122	98.02	–
Total rejected ballots		424	1.80	
Turnout		23,546	73.81	
Electors on the lists		31,903	–	–

1981 Quebec general election
Party	Candidate	Votes	%	±%
Liberal	Lucien Caron	17,406	61.40	+17.30
Parti Québécois	Fabiola Renaud	10,192	35.95	+2.75
Union Nationale	Robert Turpin	415	1.46	-18.02
Freedom of Choice	Terry Pye	196	0.69	–
Workers Communist	Marc Latour	76	0.27	–
Marxist–Leninist	Marc Bélanger	64	0.23	–
Total valid votes		28,349	98.89	–
Total rejected ballots		317	1.11	
Turnout		28,666	83.49	
Electors on the lists		34,335	–	–
Source: Official Results, Le Directeur général des élections du Québec.

1980 Quebec referendum
Side	Votes	%
Non	20,938	68.91
Oui	9,446	31.09

1976 Quebec general election
Party	Candidate	Votes	%	±%
Liberal	Lucien Caron	13,201	44.10	-23.15
Parti Québécois	Yvan Fortin	9,940	33.20	+5.72
Union Nationale	Mark A. Wainberg	5,833	19.48	+18.05
Ralliement créditiste	Joseph alias Rivard Delarosbil	499	1.67	–
Democratic Alliance	Seymour Small	315	1.05	–
Workers	Robin Gagnon	150	0.50	-
Total valid votes		29,938	97.66	–
Total rejected ballots		717	2.34	
Turnout		30,655	83.60	
Electors on the lists		36,670	–	–

1973 Quebec general election
Party	Candidate	Votes	%	±%
Liberal	Lucien Caron	19,439	67.25	+7.40
Parti Québécois	Jean-Paul Ross	7,943	27.48	+3.93
Parti créditiste	Camille Lévesque	1,109	3.84	–
Union Nationale	François Chénard	415	1.43	-9.03
Total valid votes		28,906	94.72	–
Total rejected ballots		1,610	5.28	
Turnout		30,516	80.23	
Electors on the lists		38,037	–	–

1970 Quebec general election
Party	Candidate	Votes	%	±%
Liberal	Lucien Caron	23,630	59.85	-6.41
Parti Québécois	Jean-Paul Ross	9,298	23.55	–
Union Nationale	J.-Albert Gariépy	4,129	10.46	-18.08
Ralliement créditiste	Carl B. O'Malley	1,117	2.83	–
Independent	Suzanne Ste-Marie Brassard	862	2.18	–
Independent	Gaston Gagnier	259	0.66	–
New Democratic	Gendron E. Haines	186	0.47	–

1966 Quebec general election
Party	Candidate	Votes	%
Liberal	Claude Wagner	19,181	66.26
Union Nationale	André Fabien	8,263	28.54
RIN	Réginald (Reggie) Chartrand	1,198	4.14
Ralliement national	René Lassonde	306	1.06

== See also ==
- List of Quebec provincial electoral districts
- Canadian provincial electoral districts
