= La vie compliquée de Léa Olivier =

French series of young adult novels by Catherine Girard-Audet

- Perdue; Rumeurs; Chantage; Angoisses; Montagnes russes Tornades; Trou de beigne Rivales; Résolutions; Léopard potelé Paris
- Author: Catherine Girard-Audet
- Cover artist: Veronic Ly
- Country: Quebec; Canada
- Language: Quebec French
- Genre: Young adult novel
- Publisher: Les Malins
- Published: 2012 - current
- Media type: Print (Paperback), ebook, audiobook

La vie compliquée de Léa Olivier (The Complicated Life of Lea Olivier) is a series of young adult epistolary novels that are written by Catherine Girard-Audet and published through Les Malins. Targeted towards teenage girls, the first three book in the series, Rumeurs, and Chantage, were published in 2012 and the next two, Angoisses and Montagnes russes, were published the following year. Subsequent novels were released on a yearly basis. La vie compliquée de Léa Olivier follows the central character of Léa Olivier, a young girl that is forced to move with her family to Greater Montreal, and is narrated through email, chat and SMS exchanges. Girard-Audet initially planned to have the series span nine volumes, but has since stated that while Léa Olivier will have a definite ending, she has no set number of books planned for the series. A spin-off series based on Lea's rival Maude Ménard-Bérubé, Mini-Maude, began publication in 2018.

In the 2016 Gaspard Report on the Quebec book market the Lea Oliver series, along with the release of Harry Potter and the Cursed Child and popularity of the Pokémon franchise, was credited as being responsible for an increase in sales of children's books in 2015. For the series, Girard-Audet drew upon her own childhood experiences, such as moving to Montreal from her hometown.

== Synopsis ==
Lea Oliver has been forced to leave her hometown in order to move with her family to Greater Montreal, which means leaving her friends, boyfriend, and school. She tries to adapt to her new life, only to be faced with new issues such as bullying, the difficulties of a long-distance relationship, and problems stemming from having a popular older brother.

== Books ==
1. Perdue (2012)
2. Rumeurs (2012)
3. Chantage (2012)
4. Angoisses (2013)
5. Montagnes russes (2013)
6. Tornades (2014)
7. Trou de beigne (2015)
8. Rivales (2015)
9. Résolutions (2016)
10. Léopard potelé (2017)
11. ’’Paris’’ (2018)
12. "Montréal" (2019)
13. 'Moscow'(2021)

=== Prequels and side stories ===
- Lou. pour les intimes (#0.4)
- La reine des abeilles: La vie (moins) compliquée de Maude M. Bérubé (2014, #0.5)
- La vie quand même un peu compliquée d'Alex Gravel-Côté (2017, #0.6)
- La vie (tout aussi) compliquée de Marilou Bernier (2016)

=== Graphic novels ===
- La vie compliquée de Léa Olivier, tome 0 : Le roman graphique
1. Perdue (2014)
2. Rumeurs
3. Chantage (2016)
4. Angoisses (2017)

=== Mini-Maude ===
1. Duo-tang et mains moites (2018)
2. Truites et moustiques (2018)

=== Other books ===
- L'avis de Léa Olivier sur les garçons (2014)
- L'avis de Léa Olivier sur les copines (2014)
- L'avis de Léa Olivier sur le look (2014)
