= Isabelle Melançon =

Canadian politician

Member of the National Assembly of Quebec for Verdun
- In office December 5, 2016 – August 28, 2022
- Preceded by: Jacques Daoust
- Succeeded by: Alejandra Zaga Mendez

Personal details
- Party: Quebec Liberal Party

Isabelle Melançon is a Canadian politician, who was elected to the National Assembly of Quebec in a by-election on December 5, 2016. She represented the electoral district of Verdun as a member of the Quebec Liberal Party caucus until her defeat in the 2022 Quebec general election.

== Electoral record ==
2018 Quebec general election: Verdun
Party	Candidate	Votes	%	±%
Liberal	Isabelle Melançon	11,054	35.51	-0.10
Québec solidaire	Vanessa Roy	7,457	23.95	+5.37
Coalition Avenir Québec	Nicole Leduc	6,343	20.38	+7.65
Parti Québécois	Constantin Fortier	3,929	12.62	-14.53
Green	Alex Tyrrell	1,157	3.72	-0.56
New Democratic	Raphaël Fortin	717	2.30	–
Conservative	Yedidya-Eitan Moryoussef	217	0.70	+0.05
Parti nul	Marc-André Milette	151	0.49	–
Bloc Pot	Hugo Richard	76	0.24	–
Marxist–Leninist	Eileen Studd	29	0.09	–
Total valid votes		31130	98.88	
Total rejected ballots		354	1.12	
Turnout		31,484	63.19	
Eligible voters		49,826		
Liberal hold		Swing		-2.74
Source(s) "Rapport des résultats officiels du scrutin". Élections Québec.

Quebec provincial by-election, December 5, 2016: Verdun
Party	Candidate	Votes	%	±%
Liberal	Isabelle Melançon	5,116	35.61	-14.98
Parti Québécois	Richard Langlais	3,900	27.15	+2.78
Québec solidaire	Véronique Martineau	2,669	18.58	+8.93
Coalition Avenir Québec	Ginette Marotte	1,829	12.73	+0.50
Green	David Cox	615	4.28	+2.18
Option nationale	Frédéric Dénommé	115	0.80	+0.33
Conservative	David Girard	94	0.65	–
Équipe Autonomiste	Sébastien Poirier	27	0.19	–
Total valid votes		14,365	100.00	
Rejected and declined votes		138		
Turnout		14,503	29.15	-41.54
Electors on the lists		49,758		
Liberal hold		Swing		-8.88
Source: Official Results (by-elections), Le Directeur général des élections du Québec.

Quebec provincial by-election, April 15, 2002
Party	Candidate	Votes	%	±%
Action démocratique	François Corriveau	10,129	47.84	+31.44
Liberal	Isabelle Melançon	5,973	28.21	+7.89
Parti Québécois	Louise Levasseur	5,070	23.95	-38.69
Total valid votes		21,172	99.07	–
Total rejected ballots		199	0.93	–
Turnout		21,371	60.41	-8.06
Electors on the lists		35,378	–	–
Action démocratique gain from Parti Québécois		Swing		-

Quebec provincial government of Philippe Couillard
Cabinet post (1)
Predecessor	Office	Successor
David Heurtel	Minister of Sustainable Development, the Environment, and the Fight Against Climate Change; October 11, 2017–October 18, 2018	MarieChantal Chassé
