= Paul Gobeil =

Canadian businessman and politician

MNA for Verdun
- In office 1985–1989
- Preceded by: Lucien Caron
- Succeeded by: Henri-François Gautrin

Personal details
- Born: March 1, 1942 (age 84) Saint-Rémi-de-Tingwick, Quebec
- Party: Quebec Liberal Party
- Spouse(s): Marie Deschamps, retired Justice of the Supreme Court of Canada
- Profession: businessman

Paul Gobeil (born March 1, 1942) is a Canadian businessman and former politician. Gobeil was born in Saint-Rémi-de-Tingwick, Quebec.

From 1985 to 1989, Mr. Gobeil was a Liberal member of the National Assembly for the riding of Verdun and served as Minister assigned to Administration, President of the Treasury Board and as Minister of International Affairs for the Government of Quebec.
