= Fernand Lalonde =

Canadian lawyer and politician (1932–2024)

MNA for Marguerite-Bourgeoys
- In office 1973–1984
- Preceded by: Marie-Claire Kirkland
- Succeeded by: Gilles Fortin

Personal details
- Born: August 27, 1932 Mont-Laurier, Quebec, Canada
- Died: May 5, 2024 (aged 91) Montreal, Quebec, Canada
- Party: Liberal
- Education: Collège Sainte-Marie de Montréal; Université de Montréal; McGill University
- Occupation: Lawyer

Fernand Lalonde (August 27, 1932 – May 5, 2024) was a Canadian lawyer and politician. Lalonde represented the riding of Marguerite-Bourgeoys in the National Assembly of Quebec from 1973 to 1984.

== Biography ==
Born in Mont-Laurier, Quebec, Lalonde is the son of Maurice Lalonde and Éléonore Côté. He was educated at the Séminaire de Mont-Laurier, the Séminaire de Saint-Jean-d'Iberville, the Collège Sainte-Marie de Montréal, the Université de Montréal and McGill University. He was called to the Quebec bar in 1957 and practised law in Montreal. In 1974, he was named Queen's Counsel.

Lalonde was the coordinator of the Yes campaign in the Charlottetown Accord referendum of 1992.

Lalonde died in Montreal on May 5, 2024, at age 91.
