= Gilles Fortin =

Canadian politician

MNA for Marguerite-Bourgeoys
- In office 1984–1989
- Preceded by: Fernand Lalonde
- Succeeded by: Liza Frulla-Hébert

Personal details
- Born: February 8, 1946 Montreal, Quebec
- Died: December 4, 2021 (aged 75)
- Party: Liberal

Gilles Fortin (February 8, 1946 – December 4, 2021) was a Canadian politician. Fortin represented the riding of Marguerite-Bourgeoys in the National Assembly of Quebec from 1984 to 1989. Fortin was born in Montreal, Quebec.
