= Lucien Caron =

Canadian politician

MNA for Verdun
- In office 1970–1985
- Preceded by: Claude Wagner
- Succeeded by: Paul Gobeil

Personal details
- Born: February 10, 1929 Verdun, Quebec
- Died: September 29, 2003 (aged 74) Verdun, Quebec
- Party: Quebec Liberal Party
- Relatives: Jocelyne Caron (niece)

Lucien Caron (February 10, 1929 – September 29, 2003) was a Canadian politician. He was a Liberal member of the National Assembly of Quebec from 1970 to 1985, representing the riding of Verdun.

He was a city councillor in Verdun, Quebec (today part of Montreal) from 1966 to 1977, and mayor from 1977 to 1985. He was first elected to the National Assembly in the 1970 Quebec general election, and was re-elected in 1973, 1976, and 1981. He did not run for re-election in 1985.

He was the uncle of Jocelyne Caron, who was also a member of the National Assembly.
