= Michel Leblanc (politician) =

Quebec politician

Michel Leblanc MNA

Member of the National Assembly for Marguerite-Bourgeoys
- Incumbent
- Assumed office October 5, 2026
- Preceded by: Fred Beauchemin

Personal details
- Party: Quebec Liberal Party
- Website: https://plq.org/equipe/michel-leblanc/

Michel Leblanc is a Quebec politician who was the elected to the National Assembly of Quebec for Marguerite-Bourgeoys in the 2026 Quebec general election as a member of the Quebec Liberal Party. He was the former president and CEO of the Chamber of Commerce of Metropolitan Montreal (CCMM).

== Electoral record ==
2026 Quebec general election: Marguerite-Bourgeoys
** Preliminary results — Not yet official **
Party	Candidate	Votes	%	±%
Liberal	Michel Leblanc	14,605	52.62	
Parti Québécois	Luc Côté	4,233	15.25	
Québec solidaire	Bryan Gingras	3,382	12.19	
Conservative	Sean Ross	3,244	11.69	
Coalition Avenir Québec	Adam Ahmad	1,929	6.95	
Green	Sam Kühn	255	0.92	
Parti accès propriété et équité	Ingénieur Hu	106	0.38	
Total valid votes				
Total rejected ballots				
Turnout			52.92	
Electors on the lists				
Source: Élections Québec
