= Marguerite-Bourgeoys =

Provincial electoral district in Quebec, Canada

Quebec electoral district
- Location in Montreal

Provincial electoral district
- Legislature: National Assembly of Quebec
MNA
Michel Leblanc
Liberal
- District created: 1965
- First contested: 1966
- Last contested: 2026

Demographics
- Population (2016): 76,860
- Electors (2018): 53,442
- Area (km²): 25.1
- Pop. density (per km²): 3,062.2
- Census division: Montreal (part)
- Census subdivision: Montreal (part)

Marguerite-Bourgeoys (French pronunciation: [maʁɡəʁit buʁʒwa]) is a provincial electoral district in the Montreal region of Quebec, Canada, that elects members to the National Assembly of Quebec. It comprises the LaSalle borough of the city of Montreal.

It was created for the 1966 election from parts of Jacques-Cartier and Montréal–Notre-Dame-de-Grâce electoral districts.

In the change from the 2001 to the 2011 electoral map, it gained some territory from Marquette electoral district.

It was named after Saint Marguerite Bourgeoys.

== Members of the Legislative Assembly / National Assembly ==
Legislature	Years	Member	Party
Riding created from Jacques-Cartier and Montréal–Notre-Dame-de-Grâce
28th	1966–1970	Marie-Claire Kirkland	Liberal
29th	1970–1973	Marie-Claire Kirkland	Liberal
30th	1973–1976	Fernand Lalonde	Liberal
31st	1976–1981	Fernand Lalonde	Liberal
32nd	1981–1984	Fernand Lalonde	Liberal
32nd	1984–1985	Gilles Fortin	Liberal
33rd	1985–1989	Gilles Fortin	Liberal
34th	1989–1994	Liza Frulla-Hébert	Liberal
35th	1994–1998	Liza Frulla-Hébert	Liberal
36th	1998–2003	Monique Jérôme-Forget	Liberal
37th	2003–2007	Monique Jérôme-Forget	Liberal
38th	2007–2008	Monique Jérôme-Forget	Liberal
39th	2008–2009	Monique Jérôme-Forget	Liberal
39th	2009–2012	Clément Gignac	Liberal
40th	2012–2014	Robert Poëti	Liberal
41st	2014–2018	Robert Poëti	Liberal
42nd	2018–2022	Hélène David	Liberal
43rd	2022–2023	Fred Beauchemin	Liberal
43rd	2023–2023	Fred Beauchemin	Independent
43rd	2023–2026	Fred Beauchemin	Liberal
44th	2026–Present	Michel Leblanc	Liberal

== Election results ==
2026 Quebec general election
** Preliminary results — Not yet official **
Party	Candidate	Votes	%	±%
Liberal	Michel Leblanc	14,605	52.62	
Parti Québécois	Luc Côté	4,233	15.25	
Québec solidaire	Bryan Gingras	3,382	12.19	
Conservative	Sean Ross	3,244	11.69	
Coalition Avenir Québec	Adam Ahmad	1,929	6.95	
Green	Sam Kühn	255	0.92	
Parti accès propriété et équité	Ingénieur Hu	106	0.38	
Total valid votes				
Total rejected ballots				
Turnout			52.92	
Electors on the lists				
Source: Élections Québec

2022 Quebec general election
Party	Candidate	Votes	%	±%
Liberal	Fred Beauchemin	12,635	44.78	-8.61
Coalition Avenir Québec	Vicky Michaud	6,533	23.15	-0.33
Conservative	Aleksa Drakul	3,103	11.00	–
Québec solidaire	Angélique Soleil Lavoie	2,898	10.27	-0.49
Parti Québécois	Suzanne Tremblay	1,966	6.97	-1.48
Bloc Montreal	Keeton Clarke	549	1.95	–
Green	Carole Thériault	409	1.45	-0.90
Climat Québec	Serge Bellemare	123	0.44	–
Total valid votes		28,216	98.66	–
Total rejected ballots		382	1.34	–
Turnout		28,598	54.71	-0.09
Electors on the lists		52,274	–	–

2018 Quebec general election
Party	Candidate	Votes	%	±%
Liberal	Hélène David	15,361	53.39	-16.69
Coalition Avenir Québec	Vicky Michaud	6,756	23.48	+13.57
Québec solidaire	Camille St-Laurent	3,095	10.76	+6.73
Parti Québécois	Jeannot Desbiens	2,430	8.45	-5.41
Green	Smail Louardiane	675	2.35	+0.70
New Democratic	Nashaat Elsayed	456	1.58	–
Total valid votes		28,773	98.24	
Total rejected ballots		514	1.76	
Turnout		29,287	54.80	-17.54
Eligible voters		53,442		
Liberal hold		Swing		-15.13
Source(s) "Résultats des élections générales du 1er octobre 2018". Élections Québec.

2014 Quebec general election
Party	Candidate	Votes	%	±%
Liberal	Robert Poëti	26,251	70.08	+13.17
Parti Québécois	Richard Leboeuf-McGregor	5,191	13.86	-5.91
Coalition Avenir Québec	Zoubir Bouchaala	3,711	9.91	-7.46
Québec solidaire	Alexandre Emond	1,508	4.03	-0.05
Green	Stéphanie Stevenson	619	1.65	–
Option nationale	Myriam Drouin	177	0.47	-1.08
Total valid votes		37,457	98.87	–
Total rejected ballots		428	1.13	–
Turnout		37,885	72.34	+3.29
Electors on the lists		52,371	–	–
Liberal hold		Swing		+9.54

2012 Quebec general election
Party	Candidate	Votes	%	±%
Liberal	Robert Poëti	19,993	56.91	-10.74
Parti Québécois	Jessica Riggi	6,944	19.77	+2.63
Coalition Avenir Québec	Michael Delisle	6,104	17.37	+12.39
Québec solidaire	Yebo Romaric Okou	1,434	4.08	+1.58
Option nationale	Véronique Pelletier	543	1.55	–
Marxist–Leninist	Yves Le Seigle	113	0.32	+0.22
Total valid votes		35,131	98.81	–
Total rejected ballots		423	1.19	–
Turnout		35,554	69.05	
Electors on the lists		51,493	–	–
Liberal hold		Swing		-5.05

^ Change is from redistributed results. CAQ change is from ADQ.

Quebec provincial by-election, June 22, 2009
Party	Candidate	Votes	%	±%
Liberal	Clément Gignac	7,753	72.41	+6.22
Parti Québécois	Christine Normandin	1,835	17.14	-4.56
Action démocratique	Diane Charbonneau	384	3.59	-5.08
Green	Julien Leclerc	290	2.71	–
Québec solidaire	Valérie Black St-Laurent	265	2.48	-0.96
Independent	Sylvie R. Tremblay	73	0.68	–
Parti indépendantiste	Érik Poulin	66	0.62	–
Independent	Régent Millette	41	0.38	–
Total valid votes		10,707	99.19	–
Total rejected ballots		87	0.81	–
Turnout		10,794	23.22	-24.87
Electors on the lists		46,478	–	–

2008 Quebec general election
Party	Candidate	Votes	%	±%
Liberal	Monique Jérôme-Forget	14,490	66.19	+9.05
Parti Québécois	Félix Sylvestre-Kentzinger	4,750	21.70	+5.68
Action démocratique	Michel Beaudoin	1,899	8.67	-10.25
Québec solidaire	Elena Tapia	752	3.44	+0.99
Total valid votes		21,891	98.32	–
Total rejected ballots		373	1.68	–
Turnout		22,264	48.09	-15.04
Electors on the lists		46,297	–	–

2007 Quebec general election
Party	Candidate	Votes	%	±%
Liberal	Monique Jérôme-Forget	16,752	57.14	-13.30
Action démocratique	Martin Marquis	5,547	18.92	+11.12
Parti Québécois	Siou Fan Houang	4,697	16.02	-3.52
Green	Serge Bellemare	1,454	4.96	+3.68
Québec solidaire	Jocelyne Desautels	717	2.45	–
Christian Democracy	Marc Veilleux	97	0.33	+0.04
Marxist–Leninist	Yves Le Seigle	56	0.19	-0.02
Total valid votes		29,320	99.05	–
Total rejected ballots		282	0.95	–
Turnout		29,602	63.13	-5.01
Electors on the lists		46,887	–	–

2003 Quebec general election
Party	Candidate	Votes	%	±%
Liberal	Monique Jérôme-Forget	22,807	70.44	+2.29
Parti Québécois	Suzanne Groulx	6,327	19.54	-3.12
Action démocratique	Brigitte De Laroche	2,524	7.80	+1.16
Green	Adam Jastrzebski	415	1.28	–
Equality	Paul Domagala	142	0.44	-0.78
Christian Democracy	Marc Veilleux	94	0.29	–
Marxist–Leninist	Yves Le Seigle	68	0.21	–
Total valid votes		32,377	98.89	–
Total rejected ballots		364	1.11	–
Turnout		32,741	68.14	-11.79
Electors on the lists		48,049	–	–

1998 Quebec general election
Party	Candidate	Votes	%	±%
Liberal	Monique Jérôme-Forget	23,234	68.15	-2.19
Parti Québécois	Alain Therrien	7,724	22.66	-0.30
Action démocratique	Valérie St-Jean	2,263	6.64	+3.13
Equality	Giuliana Pendenza	417	1.22	-0.16
Natural Law	Céline Chamard	292	0.86	+0.20
Socialist Democracy	Robert Aillaud	161	0.47	-0.68
Total valid votes		34,091	99.03	–
Total rejected ballots		333	0.97	–
Turnout		34,424	79.93	-6.14
Electors on the lists		43,070	–	–

^ PDS change is from NPD.

1994 Quebec general election
Party	Candidate	Votes	%	±%
Liberal	Liza Frulla	24,046	70.34	+20.46
Parti Québécois	Alain Therrien	7,850	22.96	-0.86
Action démocratique	Horace A. Sirois	1,200	3.51	–
Equality	Giuliana Pendenza	472	1.38	-22.81
New Democratic	Claudine Ricard	392	1.15	–
Natural Law	Ronald Bessette	226	0.66	–
Total valid votes		34,186	98.85	–
Total rejected ballots		398	1.15	–
Turnout		34,584	86.07	+10.92
Electors on the lists		40,182	–	–

1989 Quebec general election
Party	Candidate	Votes	%	±%
Liberal	Liza Frulla-Hébert	12,722	49.88	-23.56
Equality	Philip Chrysafidis	6,171	24.19	–
Parti Québécois	Charles Duhamel	6,075	23.82	+0.74
Progressive Conservative	Louis Marie Lacoste	538	2.11	–
Total valid votes		25,506	96.96	–
Total rejected ballots		801	3.04	–
Turnout		26,307	75.15	+1.12
Electors on the lists		35,006	–	–

1985 Quebec general election
Party	Candidate	Votes	%	±%
Liberal	Gilles Fortin	19,469	73.44	-9.71
Parti Québécois	Maurice Maisonneuve	6,119	23.08	+7.69
New Democratic	John Commins	795	3.00	–
Christian Socialist	Gilles Rivest	128	0.48	–
Total valid votes		26,511	98.32	–
Total rejected ballots		453	1.68	–
Turnout		26,964	74.03	+27.25
Electors on the lists		36,421	–	–

Quebec provincial by-election, June 18, 1984
Party	Candidate	Votes	%	±%
Liberal	Gilles Fortin	13,030	83.15	+15.64
Parti Québécois	Maurice Maisonneuve	2,412	15.39	-15.65
Republican	Louise Gravel	229	1.46	–
Total valid votes		15,671	98.44	–
Total rejected ballots		248	1.56	–
Turnout		15,919	46.78	-35.96
Electors on the lists		34,030	–	–

1981 Quebec general election
Party	Candidate	Votes	%	±%
Liberal	Fernand Lalonde	19,511	67.51	+30.86
Parti Québécois	Maurice Maisonneuve	8,970	31.04	-3.58
Union Nationale	Serge Carrier	355	1.23	-25.20
Marxist–Leninist	Christiane Robidoux	64	0.22	–
Total valid votes		28,900	98.88	–
Total rejected ballots		328	1.12	–
Turnout		29,228	82.74	-2.17
Electors on the lists		35,324	–	–

1976 Quebec general election
Party	Candidate	Votes	%	±%
Liberal	Fernand Lalonde	14,551	36.65	-29.85
Parti Québécois	Gérard Kentzinger	13,745	34.62	+6.32
Union Nationale	Domenico Izzi	10,492	26.43	+25.07
Ralliement créditiste	Raymond Jacques	603	1.52	-1.65
NDP - RMS Coalition	Thomas Rufh	312	0.78	–
Total valid votes		39,703	97.50	–
Total rejected ballots		1,017	2.50	–
Turnout		40,720	84.91	+4.51
Electors on the lists		47,955	–	–

1973 Quebec general election
Party	Candidate	Votes	%	±%
Liberal	Fernand Lalonde	23,848	66.50	-2.35
Parti Québécois	Michel Boileau	10,148	28.30	+9.33
Parti créditiste	Gilles Roberge	1,137	3.17	+1.13
Union Nationale	Alain Laroche	488	1.36	-7.24
Independent	J.-A. dit Gus Callaghan	242	0.67	–
Total valid votes		35,863	97.99	–
Total rejected ballots		737	2.01	–
Turnout		36,600	80.40	-4.01
Electors on the lists		45,524	–	–

1970 Quebec general election
Party	Candidate	Votes	%	±%
Liberal	Claire Kirkland-Casgrain	28,694	68.85	+6.71
Parti Québécois	Gilles Gasse	7,907	18.97	–
Union Nationale	Normand Bourdeau	3,584	8.60	-11.22
Ralliement créditiste	David Haines	850	2.04	–
New Democratic	Roland Morin	378	0.91	–
Independent	George McLeod	262	0.63	–
Total valid votes		41,675	97.74	–
Total rejected ballots		962	2.26	–
Turnout		42,637	84.41	+22.11
Electors on the lists		50,512	–	–

1966 Quebec general election
Party	Candidate	Votes	%
Liberal	Claire Kirkland-Casgrain	14,603	62.14
Union Nationale	Bernard Couture	4,659	19.82
Independent	Joseph Patrick Miller	2,769	11.78
RIN	Jean Martineau	1,297	5.52
Ralliement national	Roland Limoges	173	0.74
Total valid votes		23,501	97.47
Total rejected ballots		609	2.53
Turnout		24,110	62.30
Electors on the lists		38,700	–

== See also ==
- List of Quebec provincial electoral districts
- Canadian provincial electoral districts
