= Jeanne-Le Ber =

Former federal electoral district in Quebec, Canada

Coordinates: 45°28′0″N 73°34′30″W

Quebec electoral district
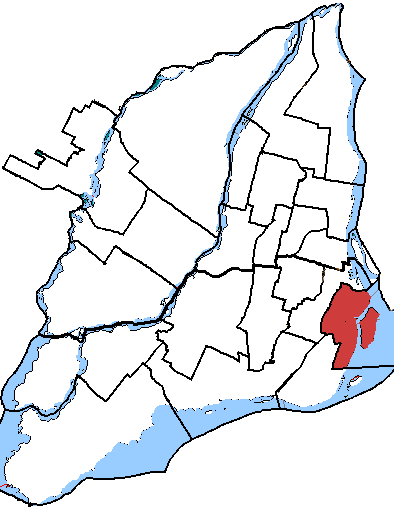
- Jeanne-Le Ber in relation to other electoral districts in Montreal
- District created: 2003
- District abolished: 2012
- First contested: 2004
- Last contested: 2011
- District webpage: profile, map

Demographics
- Population (2011): 115,821
- Electors (2006): 86,201
- Area (km²): 19.87
- Census division: Montreal
- Census subdivision: Montreal

Jeanne-Le Ber was a federal electoral district in Quebec, Canada, that was represented in the House of Commons of Canada from 2004 to 2015. Its population in 2006 was 112,863. It was abolished for the 2015 election and dissolved into Ville-Marie—Le Sud-Ouest—Île-des-Sœurs and LaSalle—Émard—Verdun.

== Geography ==
The district included the Borough of Verdun, along with the neighbourhoods of Saint-Henri, Little Burgundy, and Pointe-Saint-Charles and the eastern part of Côte-Saint-Paul, in the Southwest borough. It was named for Jeanne Le Ber, a religious recluse and craftswoman who lived in Pointe-Saint-Charles in the 18th century.

=== Political geography ===
Until 2011, the Bloc Québécois was strongest in Verdun, Saint-Henri and Point-Saint-Charles while the Liberal Party of Canada prevailed in Nuns' Island and Little Burgundy. However, in 2011 the NDP swept nearly every poll in the borough.

== Demographics ==
Average family income: $57,496 (2001)
Median household income: $31,386
Unemployment: 9.8%
Language, Mother Tongue: French 65%, English 19%, Other 16%
Religion: Catholic 70%, Protestant 9%, Muslim 4%, Other Christian 2%, Orthodox Christian 1%, Buddhist 1%, Jewish 1%, Hindu 1%, Other 1%, No Religious Affiliation 12%.
Visible Minority: Black 5%, Chinese 3%, South Asian 2%, Arab 2%, Latin American 2%, Others 2%, Southeast Asian 1%.

== History ==
The riding was created in 2003 from the ridings of Verdun—Saint-Henri—Saint-Paul—Pointe Saint-Charles and Westmount—Ville-Marie; essentially the area of Little Burgundy and Griffintown were transferred from Westmount—Ville-Marie to Verdun—Saint-Henri—Saint-Paul—Pointe Saint-Charles.

=== Members of Parliament ===
This riding has elected the following members of Parliament:

Parliament	Years	Member	Party
Jeanne-Le Ber; Riding created from Verdun—Saint-Henri—Saint-Paul—Pointe Saint-Charles and Westmount—Ville-Marie
38th	2004–2006	Liza Frulla	Liberal
39th	2006–2008	Thierry St-Cyr	Bloc Québécois
40th	2008–2011	Thierry St-Cyr	Bloc Québécois
41st	2011–2015	Tyrone Benskin	New Democratic
Riding dissolved into Ville-Marie—Le Sud-Ouest—Île-des-Sœurs and LaSalle—Émard—Verdun

== Election results ==
2011 Canadian federal election
Party	Candidate	Votes	%	±%	Expenditures
New Democratic	Tyrone Benskin	23,293	44.66	+28.96	$25,255.34
Bloc Québécois	Thierry St-Cyr	12,635	24.22	-10.69	$91,577.01
Liberal	Mark Bruneau	10,054	19.28	-12.98	$93,089.65
Conservative	Pierre Lafontaine	4,678	8.97	-2.22	$17,698.39
Green	Richard Noël	1,377	2.64	-2.14	$3,679.20
Marxist–Leninist	Eileen Studd	121	0.23	–	
Total valid votes		52,158	98.79		
Total rejected ballots		637	1.21	+0.01	
Turnout		52,795	59.08	+1.42	
Registered voters		89,365			
New Democratic gain from Bloc Québécois		Swing		+19.82	

2008 Canadian federal election
Party	Candidate	Votes	%	±%	Expenditures
Bloc Québécois	Thierry St-Cyr	17,144	34.91	-5.31	$89,615
Liberal	Christian Feuillette	15,841	32.26	-1.80	$67,962
New Democratic	Daniel Breton	7,708	15.70	+6.50	$32,536
Conservative	Daniel Beaudin	5,494	11.19	-0.65	$28,824
Green	Véronik Sansoucy	2,345	4.78	+0.09	$669
Independent	Darryl Gray	577	1.17	–	
Total valid votes		49,109	98.80		
Total rejected ballots		595	1.20	-0.12	
Turnout		49,704	57.66	-1.27	
Registered voters		86,201			
Bloc Québécois hold		Swing		-1.75	

2006 Canadian federal election
Party	Candidate	Votes	%	±%	Expenditures
Bloc Québécois	Thierry St-Cyr	20,213	40.22	-0.71	$60,248
Liberal	Liza Frulla	17,118	34.06	-7.03	$81,394
Conservative	Pierre-Olivier Brunelle	5,951	11.84	+6.31	$21,417
New Democratic	Matthew McLauchlin	4,621	9.19	+2.28	$9,536
Green	Claude William Genest	2,357	4.69	+0.61	$30
Total valid votes		50,260	98.68		
Total rejected ballots		673	1.32	-0.48	
Turnout		50,833	59.05	+3.83	
Registered voters		86,247			
Bloc Québécois gain from Liberal		Swing		+3.16	

2004 Canadian federal election
Party	Candidate	Votes	%	±%	Expenditures
Liberal	Liza Frulla	18,766	41.09	-10.53	$61,848
Bloc Québécois	Thierry St-Cyr	18,694	40.93	+12.32	$32,921
New Democratic	Anthony Philbin	3,160	6.92	+4.28	$1,281
Conservative	Pierre-Albert Sévigny	2,524	5.53	-6.21	$14,155
Green	Jean-Claude Mercier	1,864	4.08	–	–
Marijuana	Cathy Duchesne	520	1.14	–	–
Marxist–Leninist	Normand Chouinard	148	0.32	–	–
Total valid votes		45,676	98.20	–	$81,871
Total rejected ballots		836	1.80		
Turnout		46,512	55.22	+1.64	
Registered voters		84,223			
Liberal hold		Swing		-11.42	

Change is from redistributed votes from the 2000 election. Conservative change is based on a combination of Canadian Alliance and Progressive Conservative votes.

2000 federal election redistributed results
Party	Vote	%
Liberal	22,864	51.62
Bloc Québécois	12,673	28.61
Progressive Conservative	2,949	6.66
Canadian Alliance	2,248	5.07
New Democratic	1,168	2.64
Others	2,394	5.40

== See also ==
- List of Canadian electoral districts
- Historical federal electoral districts of Canada
