= Marie-Claire Kirkland =

Canadian politician

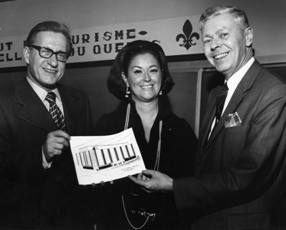
- Marie-Claire Kirkland-Casgrain in 1971

MLA for Jacques-Cartier
- In office 1961–1966
- Preceded by: Charles-Aimé Kirkland
- Succeeded by: Noël Saint-Germain

MNA for Marguerite-Bourgeoys
- In office 1966–1973
- Preceded by: first member
- Succeeded by: Fernand Lalonde

Personal details
- Born: September 8, 1924 Palmer, Massachusetts, United States
- Died: March 24, 2016 (aged 91)
- Party: Liberal
- Spouse(s): Philippe Casgrain (m. 1954, div), Wyndham Strover (m. 1989)
- Children: Lynne, Kirkland, Marc
- Education: McGill University
- Profession: lawyer

Marie-Claire Kirkland-Casgrain, CM CQ QC (September 8, 1924 – March 24, 2016) was a Quebec lawyer, judge and politician. She was the first woman elected to the Legislative Assembly of Quebec, the first woman appointed a Cabinet minister in Quebec, the first woman appointed acting premier, and the first woman judge to serve in the Quebec Provincial Court.

== Life ==
Kirkland was born in 1924 in Palmer, Massachusetts, the daughter of Rose Demers and Charles-Aimé Kirkland, who was studying at Harvard). (Later he served as a Quebec MLA from 1939 to his death in 1961.).

After they moved to Canada, she received a Bachelor of Arts in 1947 and a Bachelor of Civil Law in 1950 from McGill University. She was admitted to the Quebec Bar in 1952 and was made a Queen's Counsel in 1969. She practiced law in Montreal From 1952 to 1961.

She was elected in a 1961 by-election as a Liberal in the district of Jacques-Cartier, which her father had represented up to his death in 1961. She was re-elected in the 1962 general election. She held two cabinet posts in the government of Jean Lesage: Minister without Portfolio (1962 to 1964) (when she was the first woman to serve in a Quebec provincial cabinet), and Minister of Transport and Communications (1964 to 1966). In 1966, she was elected in the riding of Marguerite-Bourgeoys and re-elected in 1970. She also held two cabinet posts in the government of Robert Bourassa: Minister of Tourism, Game and Fishing (1970 to 1972) and Minister of Cultural Affairs (1972 to 1973).

She resigned in 1973 to become a judge. She retired in 1991.

In 1985, she was made a Knight of the National Order of Quebec. In 1992, she was made a Member of the Order of Canada. In 1993, she was the recipient of the Governor General's Award in Commemoration of the Persons Case.

She married lawyer Philippe Casgrain, with whom she had three children. After their divorce, she remarried, to Wyndham Strover.

She died at the age of 91 on March 24, 2016.

== Legacy ==
In 2012, Quebec premier Pauline Marois unveiled a statue of Thérèse Casgrain, Idola Saint-Jean, Marie Lacoste Gérin-Lajoie and Kirkland outside the National Assembly of Quebec. The statue by Jules Lasalle was to celebrate the 50th anniversary of Kirkland being made the first female cabinet minister in Quebec.

She was the first woman in the history of Quebec to be honoured with a national funeral.
