= Liza Frulla =

Canadian politician (born 1949)

The Honourable Liza Frulla The Third PC CM OQ

Member of the Canadian Parliament for Jeanne-Le Ber Verdun—Saint-Henri—Saint-Paul—Pointe Saint-Charles (2002-2004)
- In office May 13, 2002 – January 23, 2006
- Preceded by: Raymond Lavigne
- Succeeded by: Thierry St-Cyr

Member of the National Assembly of Quebec for Marguerite-Bourgeoys
- In office September 25, 1989 – November 30, 1998
- Preceded by: Gilles Fortin
- Succeeded by: Monique Jérôme-Forget

Personal details
- Born: March 30, 1949 (age 77) Montreal, Quebec
- Party: Liberal Party of Canada (national); Quebec Liberal Party (provincial)
- Occupation: broadcaster

Liza Frulla PC CM OQ (born March 30, 1949, in Montreal, Quebec), formerly known as Liza Frulla-Hébert, is a former Canadian politician. She was a Liberal Member of the National Assembly of Quebec from 1989 to 1998, a Liberal Member of Parliament from 2002 to 2006, and a member of the Cabinet of Prime Minister Paul Martin.

== Background ==
All four of Frulla's grandparents were born in Italy and like many Italian Quebeckers, her family was strongly federalist and Quebec Liberal oriented. In college she says she was not politically involved as she voted "yes" in the 1980 referendum, believing it was only fair to give René Lévesque's government a mandate to negotiate, but when the results were strongly "no", she reverted to federalism. She then later worked as a marketer for Labatt Breweries when she regularly met with government officials and eventually joined the Quebec Liberals under Robert Bourassa.

== Early career ==
From 1974 to 1976, Frulla worked for the public affairs service of the organizing committee for the 1976 Montreal Olympics. She subsequently became the first woman reporter accredited to cover professional sport in the electronic media.

== Provincial politics ==
From 1989 to 1998, she represented the riding of Marguerite-Bourgeoys in the National Assembly of Quebec. She was Minister of Communications and Minister of Cultural Affairs. She was vice-chair of the "No" committee in the 1995 Quebec referendum. However, on November 1, 2007, while appearing on the RDI program Le Club des Ex, she admitted to having voted for the "Yes" side in the 1980 referendum.

In 1998, she left the National Assembly to host her own show, Liza, on public broadcaster Radio-Canada until 2002.

== Federal politics ==
She was elected to Parliament in a 2002 by-election in the now-defunct riding of Verdun—Saint-Henri—Saint-Paul—Pointe-Saint-Charles. After that riding was merged with portions of neighbouring ridings to form Jeanne-Le Ber, she was re-elected by a razor-thin margin over Thierry St-Cyr in 2004; she subsequently lost to him in 2006.

Frulla has the prenominal "the Honourable" and the postnominal "PC" for life by virtue of being made a member of the Queen's Privy Council for Canada on December 12, 2003. She was the Minister of Canadian Heritage and Minister responsible for the Status of Women in the cabinet of Prime Minister Paul Martin and previously served as Minister of Social Development.

== Honours ==
In 2016, she was made an Officer of the National Order of Quebec. In 2017, she was appointed as a Member of the Order of Canada.

== Electoral record (partial) ==
2004 Canadian federal election: Jeanne-Le Ber
Party	Candidate	Votes	%	Expenditures
Liberal	Liza Frulla	18,766	41.09	$61,848
Bloc Québécois	Thierry St-Cyr	18,694	40.93	$32,921
New Democratic	Anthony Philbin	3,160	6.92	$1,281
Conservative	Pierre-Albert Sévigny	2,524	5.53	$14,155
Green	Jean Claude Mercier	1,864	4.08	not listed
Marijuana	Cathy Duchesne	520	1.14	none listed
Marxist–Leninist	Normand Chouinard	148	0.32	none listed
Total valid votes		45,676	100.00	
Total rejected ballots		836		
Turnout		46,512	55.22	
Electors on the lists		84,223		
Percentage change figures are factored for redistribution. Conservative Party percentages are contrasted with the combined Canadian Alliance and Progressive Conservative figures from 2000. Sources: Official Results, Elections Canada and Financial Returns, Elections Canada. Italicized expenditures refer to totals submitted by the candidate and are presented when the reviewed totals are not available.

27th Canadian Ministry (2003–2006) – Cabinet of Paul Martin
Cabinet posts (2)
Predecessor	Office	Successor
Hélène Scherrer	Minister of Canadian Heritage; 2004–2006	Bev Oda
Jane Stewart	Minister of Human Resources Development; 2003–2004 styled as Minister of Social Development	Ken Dryden
Special Cabinet Responsibilities
Predecessor	Title	Successor
Jean Augustine	Minister responsible for the Status of Women; 2004–2006	Bev Oda
