= Clément Gignac =

Canadian politician

The Honourable Clément Gignac

Canadian Senator from Kennebec
- Incumbent
- Assumed office July 29, 2021
- Nominated by: Justin Trudeau
- Appointed by: Mary Simon
- Preceded by: Serge Joyal (2020)

Minister of Economic Development, Innovation and Export Trade of Quebec
- In office June 23, 2009 – September 6, 2011
- Premier: Jean Charest
- Preceded by: Raymond Bachand
- Succeeded by: Sam Hamad

Member of the National Assembly of Quebec for Marguerite-Bourgeoys
- In office June 22, 2009 – September 4, 2012
- Preceded by: Monique Jérôme-Forget
- Succeeded by: Robert Poëti

Personal details
- Born: May 7, 1955 (age 71) Saint-Gilbert, Quebec, Canada
- Party: Progressive Senate Group
- Other political affiliations: Quebec Liberal
- Spouse: Jocelyne Duval
- Profession: Politician

Clément Gignac (born May 7, 1955) is a Canadian politician who represented the riding of Marguerite-Bourgeoys in the National Assembly of Quebec from 2009 to 2012. A member of the Quebec Liberal Party, he was elected in a by-election on June 22, 2009, following the resignation of Monique Jérôme-Forget.

On the following day, Gignac was named by Jean Charest as the new Minister of Economic Development, Innovation and Export Trade — a role which was previously held by Raymond Bachand, who was also the Finance Minister.

Prior to his election to the assembly, Gignac was (for a brief period of time) a senior advisor to the deputy minister of Finance in Ottawa.

Prior to this appointment, Gignac was senior vice-president, chief economist and strategist of National Bank Financial and in this role has ranked constantly over the last decade amongst the top strategists and economists in the country.

On July 29, 2021, the Governor General Mary Simon, under recommendation of Prime Minister Justin Trudeau, appointed Gignac as a Québec member of the Senate of Canada.

== Biography ==
Gignac holds both a Bachelor's degree and Master's degree in economics from Université Laval. During the 2008–09 financial crisis, Gignac was a special adviser to the deputy minister of finance and represented Canada on one of the working groups set up by the G20. During the previous 20 years, Gignac acted as economic consultant and strategist for several prominent financial institutions, notably National Bank Financial, as Vice-President and Chief Economist from 2000 to 2008. For five consecutive years, his group ranked among the top three Canadian economist teams in the annual Brendan Wood International survey of some 100 institutional clients.

As minister of Economic Development, he introduced the government's strategy in research and innovation and participated in the creation of its strategy on entrepreneurship.

Since December 2012, Clément Gignac has held the position of Senior Vice-President and Chief Economist at Industrial Alliance. As well as serving as spokesman on economic matters, he chairs the asset allocation committee and manages diversified funds with assets exceeding $3 billion.

In 2012, he was asked by the prestigious World Economic Forum to sit as chair on the Global Agenda Council on Competitiveness, and in May 2015, he received the Gloire de l'Escolle medal for exceptional merit from Université Laval.

On July 29, 2021 it was announced that Clément Gignac was appointed to the Canadian senate by Prime Minister Justin Trudeau, to sit as an independent senator.

== Electoral record ==
Quebec provincial by-election, June 22, 2009: Marguerite-Bourgeoys
Party	Candidate	Votes	%	±%
Liberal	Clément Gignac	7,753	72.41	+6.22
Parti Québécois	Christine Normandin	1,835	17.14	-4.56
Action démocratique	Diane Charbonneau	384	3.59	-5.08
Green	Julien Leclerc	290	2.71	–
Québec solidaire	Valérie Black St-Laurent	265	2.48	-0.96
Independent	Sylvie R. Tremblay	73	0.68	–
Parti indépendantiste	Érik Poulin	66	0.62	–
Independent	Régent Millette	41	0.38	–
Total valid votes		10,707	99.19	–
Total rejected ballots		87	0.81	–
Turnout		10,794	23.22	-24.87
Electors on the lists		46,478	–	–

== See also ==
- Université Laval

Political offices
Preceded by Raymond Bachand	Minister of Economic Development, Innovation and Exports; June 23, 2009–September 6, 2011	Succeeded by Sam Hamad
