= Tyrone Benskin =

Canadian actor, theatre director and politician

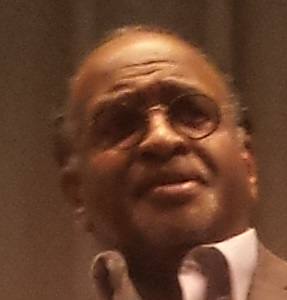

Member of the Canadian Parliament for Jeanne-Le Ber
- In office 2 May 2011 – 19 October 2015
- Preceded by: Thierry St-Cyr
- Succeeded by: District Abolished

Personal details
- Born: 29 December 1958 (age 67) Bristol, England
- Party: New Democratic
- Profession: Actor, Theatre director, Unionist

Tyrone Benskin (born 29 December 1958) is an English-Canadian actor, theatre director and politician. He was elected Member of Parliament in the Jeanne-Le Ber riding, in Montreal, Quebec, in the 2011 Canadian federal election and served as an MP until 2015.

== Early life ==
Benskin was born in Bristol, England but moved to Canada in 1968 at age nine.

== Career ==
=== Artistic ===
Having studied theatre at both CEGEP and university levels in Montreal, Benskin has become a significant presence in theatre, film, television and music. His theatre credits include features appearances on such celebrated stages as the Stratford Shakespeare Festival, the National Arts Centre and the Centaur Theatre in Montreal.

Benskin also supplied the voice of Kobalt in the 1996 animated series of Flash Gordon and Bo and Wimzie's father Rousso in the children's television series Wimzie's House.

=== Politics ===
On 30 January 2011, Benskin was announced as the federal New Democratic Party candidate in the Montreal-area riding of Jeanne-Le Ber in the 2011 federal election. During the election, his candidacy was seen as one of the NDP's better chances for a gain in Quebec, and NDP leader Jack Layton described him as having minister potential. On 2 May 2011, he was elected to the House of Commons of Canada with a substantial margin, defeating Bloc Québécois incumbent Thierry St-Cyr.

Benskin was named the Official Opposition's critic for Canadian Heritage, and later transferred to the Official Languages file as deputy critic. He was dropped from the shadow cabinet after party leader Thomas Mulcair learned that Benskin owed the Quebec revenue agency $58,000 for unpaid taxes from 2007 to 2011. Benskin apologized, attributing the non-payment to having precarious employment as an artist prior to becoming an MP. Benskin did not stand as a candidate in the 2015 federal election, having lost the local party's nomination to Allison Turner.

== Electoral record ==
2011 Canadian federal election
Party	Candidate	Votes	%	±%	Expenditures
New Democratic	Tyrone Benskin	23,293	44.66	+28.96	25,255.34
Bloc Québécois	Thierry St-Cyr	12,635	24.22	-10.69	91,577.01
Liberal	Mark Bruneau	10,054	19.28	-12.98	93,534.65
Conservative	Pierre Lafontaine	4,678	8.97	-2.22	17,698.39
Green	Richard Noël	1,377	2.64	-2.14	3,679.20
Marxist–Leninist	Eileen Studd	121	0.23	–	0.00
Total valid votes		52,158	100.00		
Total rejected ballots		637	1.21	+0.01	
Turnout		52,795	59.61	+1.95	

== Filmography ==
=== Film ===
- Killing 'em Softly (1982) as 2nd Black man
- Adam's Wall as Mostafa
- Aftermath (2002) as Arnold Ross
- The Amityville Curse (1990) as Video Technician
- Bears as Narrator
- Blind Fear as Guard
- Canvas (1992) as Detective Austin
- Cargo (2000) as Radio
- Criminal Law as Jackson
- Dead Like Me: Life After Death as Police Commissioner Cusek
- Death of a Ladies' Man as Jonathan Hébert
- Enemies: A Love Story as Cabbie
- Fais danser la poussière as Lawyer
- Full Disclosure (2001) as FBI Special Agent Draper
- I'm Not There (2007) as Mr. Avrin
- Island of the Dead (2000) as Dwight Truman
- Jack Paradise: Montreal by Night (Jack Paradise : Les nuits de Montréal) as Winston White
- The Kiss (1988) as Railway Station Doctor
- Lotto 6/66 (2006, Short) as Landlord
- Money (1991) as 3rd Broker
- Relative Fear (1994) as Cop
- The Killing Machine (1994) as Doctor #2
- Soul Survivor (1995) as Jerome
- The Wrong Woman (1995) as Mitchum
- Marked Man (1996) as Detective Boyd
- Sci-fighters (1996) as Dr. Gene Washington
- Stranger in the House (1997) as Slovitz
- Peepers as Helman
- Scanners II: The New Order as Store Owner
- Stolen Babies, Stolen Lives as Narrator
- Sunday Afternoon as Monty
- Volcanos of the Deep Sea as Narrator
- 10.5: Apocalypse as Jackson, The Bartender
- 300 (2006) as Persian Emissary
- Evergreen$ (Sapin$) - 2023 as Morgan
- The Mechanics of Borders (La Mécanique des frontières) - 2025
- Lunar Sway - 2026

=== Television ===
- Night Heat (1988) as Mitch Malloy
- Shades of Love: The Man Who Guards the Greenhouse (1988, TV Movie) as Workman
- The Phone Call (1989, TV Movie) as Police Officer #2
- The Final Heist (1991, TV Movie) as Juan
- Urban Angel (1991) as Agent #1 / Travis
- The Boys of St. Vincent (1994, TV Movie) as Dr. Maynard
- Race to Freedom: The Underground Railroad (1994, TV Movie) as Ward
- TekWar: TekLords (1994, TV Movie) as Dr. Brimell
- My Breast (1994, TV Movie) as Dr. Henry Balmer
- Ready or Not (1994) as Mr. Edwards
- Forever Knight (1995) as Jonah
- Convict Cowboy (1995, TV Movie) as Curtis
- Cagney and Lacey: The View Through the Glass Ceiling (1995, TV Movie) as Dr. Nasser
- Side Effects (1995) as Detective Watson
- Spenser: A Savage Place (1995, TV Movie) as Stevenson
- Johnny and Clyde (1995, TV Movie) as Hadley
- Dark Eyes (1995) as Bill Marsden
- Due South (1995–1998) as Mr. Shawl / Jeff Storey
- Wimzie's House (1995–1996) as Rousso (voice)
- Are You Afraid of the Dark? (1996) as Jack Palmer
- A Husband, a Wife and a Lover (1996, TV Movie) as Dr. Carpenter
- F/X: The Series (1996) as Judge
- We the Jury (1996, TV Movie) as Noland James
- Riverdale (1997) as Mike
- A Taste of Shakespeare (1997) as Prince of Morocco / Tubal / Duke of Venice
- Earth: Final Conflict (1998) as Frank Rice
- The Long Island Incident (1998, TV Movie) as Colin Ferguson
- Thanks of a Grateful Nation (1998, TV Movie) as Superintendent Meeker
- Naked City: Justice with a Bullet (1998, TV Movie) as Donovan
- Live Through This (2000) as 'Sparky'
- Big Wolf on Campus (2000) as Male Nurse St. Jacques
- Radio Active (2001) as Coach Hadress
- The Killing Yard (2001, TV Movie) as Haywood Burns
- Tales from the Neverending Story (2001) as Cairon
- Largo Winch (2001–2002) as Waldo Buzetti
- Redeemer (2002, TV Movie)
- Obsessed (2002, TV Movie) as Judge Tyrone Wolf
- Deacons for Defense (2003, TV Movie) as Archie
- The Newsroom (2003) as Mr. Taylor
- The Wool Cap (2004, TV Movie) as Clarence
- Naked Josh (2004) as Tyrone Charpentier
- 15/Love (2005) as Mr. White
- Mind Over Murder (2005, TV Movie) as Julian Hasty
- Charlie Jade (2005) as Karl Lubinsky
- Proof of Lies (2006, TV Movie) as Robert Hunter
- The Rival (2006, TV Movie) as Detective Martin
- Superstorm (2007) as Murray Michaels
- Durham County (2007) as Ranjit
- Christie's Revenge (2007, TV Movie) as Detective Hogue
- The Dead Zone (2007) as Orderley Dewey Morris
- The Love of Her Life (2008, TV Movie) as Officer Kingman
- Sophie (2008) as Mr. Byrd
- The Christmas Choir (2008, TV Movie) as Bob
- Final Verdict (2009, TV Movie) as Detective Lewis
- My Nanny's Secret (2009, TV Movie) as Detective Drabant
- Summer Villa (2016, TV Movie) as Dominic Barone
- Jupiter's Legacy (2021) as Willie Small
- Debris (2021) as George Jones
- Dan Brown's The Lost Symbol (2021) as Warren Bellamy
- The Boys (2024) as Elijah (in "Dirty Business")

=== Animation ===
- Ace Ventura: Pet Detective – Additional Voices
- Anatole
- Animal Crackers
- Bad Dog – Judge Bigly
- Belphegor – Additional Voices
- Birdz – Additional Voices
- Diabolik
- Dog's World
- Dragon Hunters
- Flash Gordon – Kobalt
- Flight Squad
- Freaky Stories
- Ivanhoe
- Jim Button – Additional Voices
- Kassai and Leuk – Additional Voices
- Malo Korrigan – Additional Voices
- Manivald – Moose
- A Miss Mallard Mystery – Additional Voices
- Patrol 03 (1997)
- The Country Mouse and the City Mouse Adventures (1997–1999) (uncredited)
- Mythic Warriors: Guardians of the Legend (1998–1999) as Elpenor
- Tripping the Rift (2004)
- The Legend of Sarila (2003) as Itak (English version)
- Ned's Newt – Additional Voices
- The Neverending Story
- Ocean Tales
- Pet Pals
- Pig City
- Princess Sissi – Joseph, Dania
- Rescue Heroes – Additional Voices
- Ripley's Believe It or Not! – Roger Glapion
- Silver Surfer
- Superplants – Narrator
- The Tofus – Additional Voices
- X-Chromosome – Additional Voices
- X-DuckX – Additional Voices

=== Video games ===
- Jagged Alliance (1994)
- Jagged Alliance: Deadly Games (1996)
- Jagged Alliance 2 (1999)
- Wizardry 8 (2001)
- Evolution Worlds (2002) as Federico / Infantryman #4
- Rainbow Six: Vegas (2006)
- Far Cry 2 (2008)
- Splinter Cell (2010) as Lucias Gaillard
- Splinter Cell: Conviction (2010) as Lucious Galliard
