= Monique Jérôme-Forget =

Canadian politician (born 1940)

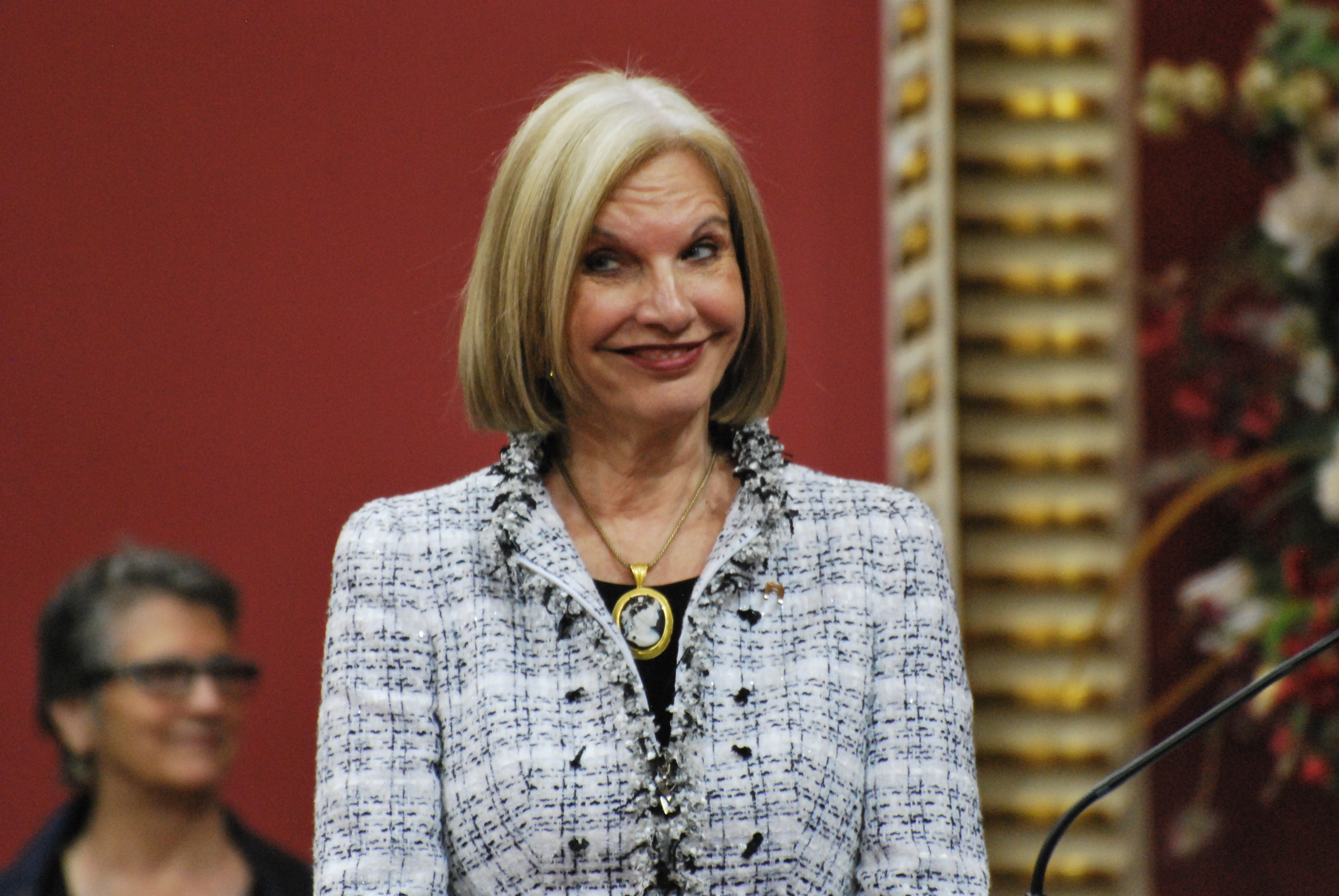

Member of the National Assembly of Quebec for Marguerite-Bourgeoys
- In office November 30, 1998 – April 8, 2009
- Preceded by: Liza Frulla
- Succeeded by: Clément Gignac

Personal details
- Born: August 8, 1940 (age 85) Montreal, Quebec
- Party: Quebec Liberal Party
- Spouse: Claude Forget
- Profession: psychologist

Monique Jérôme-Forget (French pronunciation: [mɔnik ʒeʁom fɔʁʒɛ]; born August 8, 1940) is a psychologist and a former Quebec politician. She was the Member of National Assembly (MNA) for the riding of Marguerite-Bourgeois in the Montreal region as a member of the Quebec Liberal Party between 1998 and 2009. With the government in power she was the Finance Minister from 2007 to 2009, the President of the Treasury Board and the Minister of government services and the Minister responsible of the government administration from 2003 to 2008.

== Education ==
From 1960 to 1976, Jérôme-Forget studied at several universities including the University of London (England) in economics, Johns Hopkins University in history, the Université de Montréal in public economics and McGill University in psychology. At the end of her studies, she received a bachelor's and doctor's degree in psychology at McGill in 1972 and 1976 respectively.

== Professional career ==
On completing her doctorate in psychology, Jérôme-Forget began practice as a psychologist at the Royal Victoria Hospital (part of the McGill University Hospital Centre). From 1979 to 1982, she worked as the Director of Professional Services at the CLSC Metro, Montreal. From 1982 to 1985, she served as Assistant Deputy Minister in the federal Department of Health and Welfare in Ottawa. In 1985–86, she worked as the Vice-Rector, Finance, Institutional Research and Human Resources, at Concordia University in Montreal. From 1986 to 1990, she was chair and CEO of Quebec's Commission de la santé et de la sécurité du travail (CSST). The commission is responsible for workplace health and safety. She also was chair, Institut de recherche en santé et sécurité du travail (IRSST). From 1991 to 1998, she was the CEO of the Institute for Research on Public Policy (IRPP). As well from 1993 to 1998 she was a columnist for the Financial Post and Les Affaires.

== Community involvement ==
She has been heavily involved in the community, working for the Montreal Symphony Orchestra, la Cinematheque Québécoise, the Quebec federation for the environment, the Social policies committee of the Organisation for Economic Co-operation and Development (OECD), the Medical Council of Canada and the Société investissement jeunesse. She was also a member of the Institute for Intergovernmental Relations of Queen's University in Kingston, Ontario, as well as the McGill University Institute for Canadian Studies. She was the representative for Canada on the International Commission for Workers' Compensation.

== Political career ==
=== First mandate ===
Jérôme-Forget entered politics in 1998. She became the MNA for Marguerite-Bourgeoys in the 1998 elections and would serve as the opposition party's critic in finances when the Parti Québécois had their second mandate as a majority government.

=== Second term ===
She was re-elected for a second term in the 2003 elections, in which the Liberals won a majority government, and became a prominent force inside Jean Charest's cabinet as she was named the president of the Treasury Board and the Minister of Public Administration and Government Services. She was also for half the mandate the Minister responsible for the Montreal region until 2005 when the responsibilities were given to Culture Minister Line Beauchamp.

As public administration minister she negotiated a six-year collective agreement covering half a million public sector employees and resolved a long-standing issue over pay equity affecting some 400,000, mostly female employees. As Treasury Board President she kept the nominal growth of public expenditure under 5% giving Quebec the slowest growing public sector of all Canadian governments. As a result, the credit rating of the Province of Quebec was increased on two occasions.

She also put together the most important infrastructure program in the history of Quebec ($41 billion for the first five years) and introduced in that province the concept of Public-Private Partnerships (or PFI) and to oversee it, she set up an agency that has won two international prizes for the quality of its work. Under these initiates, as she resigned her position in the government some $10 billion of projects from highways to teaching hospitals and concert hall were under way. The program was enhanced in her third (2009–2010) budget as an important element in her recession fighting strategy.

=== Third term ===
She was easily re-elected for a third term in the 2007 elections. After the election, she became one of the senior ministers of the new minority government as Premier Charest gave her additional responsibilities including the portfolio of Governmental Services, previously held by Henri-Francois Gautrin, and Finances which had been held by Michel Audet who did not seek a re-election in 2007. She became the first minister since Jacques Parizeau to hold both the positions of President of the Treasury Board and Minister of Finances.

Her 2007 budget provided for a $700 million reduction in personal income tax. It also initiated a phased abolition of the capital tax on businesses and continued a policy of significant funding increments to the health and education missions. These moves on the fiscal front were designed to implement campaign commitments to lighten the fiscal burden in Quebec to a more reasonable level as compared with other provinces. Over the period 2007–2008, she supervised the negotiations that led to the "Montreal Accord" to deal with the problem with asset-backed commercial paper.

The Parti Québécois and Action démocratique du Québec declared that they would vote against the budget. However, only three PQ members were present for the budget vote on June 1, 2007, so that the minority Liberal government got its budget approved as the Parti Québécois clearly did not want to provoke an election.

=== Fourth term ===
She was easily re-elected for a fourth time in her riding in the 2008 elections. At her request, she gave up her portfolio of government services to Bellechasse MNA Dominique Vien as well as the position of President of the Treasury Board to former Finances Minister and former Deputy Premier Monique Gagnon-Tremblay but kept the responsibility for the Infrastructures program. In this last capacity, she signed several infrastructure agreements with her federal counterpart then also engaged in an anti-recession program.

The global credit crisis had gathered steam during the 2007-2008 period. It was compounded by a stock market collapse in October 2008. In the last months of 2008, she played a key role in developing a joint effort by the Alberta, Ontario and Federal governments, and of course that of Quebec, in providing guarantees to holders of asset backed commercial paper. This financial crisis had until then a relatively mild impact of the Quebec economy. This however was to change in the last days of 2008 and the first months of 2009.

In her third budget, presented on March 14, 2009, there was a major shift from the budget balance of previous years into a significant $3.9 billion deficit that the difficult circumstances made both inevitable and desirable to stimulate aggregate demand in the economy. She announced in that budget and the economic statement made in January several stimulative measures such a program called REA-II as well as additional funding of $100 million each for Investissements Quebec and the Societe Générale de Financement. The budget anticipated a return to equilibrium over the next four years and anticipated a rise of the provincial sales tax of one percent as of January 2011, as well as yearly cost-of-living related increases in charges and fees for government services as of the same date. However, she was clear that other, unspecified tax increases or expenditures cutbacks would be needed to restore a balanced budget.

In the beginning of February, a formal announcement of nearly $40 billion of losses were made by the Caisse de dépôt et placement du Québec for 2008, the worst results in the Caisse's history. These results (and even their anticipation given the dramatic declines in asset prices over the preceding months) generated a lot of debates and questions about the quality of risk management practices at the Caisse, the nature of its objectives and the adequacy of its management. All that was accompanied by many changes in that management including the Board, the chair and the CEO's position.

A federal-provincial tax controversy ensued one week later following the decision by the Ontario government to harmonize the PST and the GST. After the federal government offered $4 billion to Ontario in compensation for the tax move, Jérôme-Forget and the Quebec government requested a $2.6 billion compensation from Ottawa. The province had received no money when it harmonized both taxes in the 1990s.

On April 8, 2009, Jérôme-Forget announced her retirement from politics.

She was named a Member of the Order of Canada in 2015.

Political offices
Preceded by Michel Audet	Minister of Finances (Quebec); 2007–2009	Succeeded by Raymond Bachand
Preceded by Joseph Facal	President of the Treasury Board (Quebec); 2003–2008	Succeeded by Monique Gagnon-Tremblay
Preceded by Henri-François Gautrin	Minister of Government Services; 2007–2008	Succeeded by Dominique Vien
