= Robert Poëti =

Canadian politician

Member of the National Assembly of Quebec for Marguerite-Bourgeoys
- In office 4 September 2012 – 29 August 2018
- Preceded by: Clément Gignac
- Succeeded by: Hélène David

Personal details
- Born: 13 August 1955 (age 71) Montreal, Quebec
- Party: Liberal
- Profession: Police officer

Robert Poëti (born 13 August 1955) is a Canadian politician and former police officer of the Sûreté du Québec, formerly representing the riding of Marguerite-Bourgeoys in the National Assembly of Quebec. A member of the Quebec Liberal Party caucus, he was first elected in the 2012 election.
