= Michel Audet =

Canadian politician and economist

Member of the National Assembly of Quebec for Laporte
- In office April 14, 2003 – March 26, 2007
- Preceded by: André Bourbeau
- Succeeded by: Nicole Ménard

Personal details
- Born: November 12, 1940 (age 85) Jonquière, Quebec

Michel Audet (French pronunciation: [miʃɛl odɛ]; born November 12, 1940) is an economist and a politician in Quebec, Canada. He was the Finance Minister of Quebec in the first Charest government.

== Biography ==
Audet was first elected to the National Assembly of Quebec in the 2003 Quebec general election. A member of the Quebec Liberal Party, he was elected in the riding of Laporte. He has a master's degree of Economics from Université Laval and is also a graduate of the École nationale d'administration in Paris. An economist, Audet was Minister of Economic and Regional Development from 2003 to 2004. He was made Finance Minister in 2005.

On February 13, 2007 he announced that he would be leaving politics at the end of his current term. He is not to be confused with Michel Audet, a professor in industrial relations at Université Laval, who currently serves as the representative of the Government of Quebec in Canada's delegation to UNESCO.

Political offices
Preceded by Yves Séguin	Minister of Finance (Québec); 2005–2007	Succeeded by Monique Jérôme-Forget
