= Pierre-Laporte (electoral district) =

Provincial electoral district in Quebec, Canada

Quebec electoral district
- Location in Longueuil
- Coordinates: 45.516°N 73.501°W

Provincial electoral district
- Legislature: National Assembly of Quebec
MNA
David Bowles
Liberal
- District created: 1972
- First contested: 1973
- Last contested: 2026

Demographics
- Population (2011): 60,970
- Electors (2012): 45,573
- Area (km²): 20.2
- Pop. density (per km²): 3,018.3
- Census division: Longueuil (part)
- Census subdivision(s): Longueuil (part), Saint-Lambert, Brossard (part)

Pierre-Laporte (formerly Laporte; French pronunciation: [lapɔʁt]) is a provincial electoral district in the urban agglomeration of Longueuil, a suburb of Montreal in the Montérégie region of Quebec, Canada, that elects members to the National Assembly of Quebec.

It was created for the 1973 election from parts of Taillon and Chambly.

It was named after former Liberal Minister Pierre Laporte who was kidnapped and killed by militants of the Front de libération du Québec during the October Crisis in 1970.

In the change from the 2011 to the 2017 electoral, which first applied in the 2018 election, it gained the area around the Champlain Mall from the riding of La Pinière.

In June 2025, it was announced that the riding would be renamed to Pierre-Laporte after the 2026 general election.

== Geography ==
The riding currently includes:

- The entire City of Saint-Lambert
- The following areas of the City of Longueuil:
  - Borough of Greenfield Park,
  - LeMoyne district of the Borough of Le Vieux-Longueuil,
  - Laflèche district of the Borough of Saint-Hubert
- The north-west areas of Brossard

In the change from the 2001 to the 2011 electoral map, its territory remained unchanged.

== Members of the National Assembly ==
This riding has elected the following members of the National Assembly:

Legislature	Years	Member	Party
Riding created from Taillon and Chambly
30th	1973–1976	André Déom	Liberal
31st	1976–1981	Pierre Marois	Parti Québécois
32nd	1981–1985	André Bourbeau	Liberal
33rd	1985–1989	André Bourbeau	Liberal
34th	1989–1994	André Bourbeau	Liberal
35th	1994–1998	André Bourbeau	Liberal
36th	1998–2003	André Bourbeau	Liberal
37th	2003–2007	Michel Audet	Liberal
38th	2007–2008	Nicole Ménard	Liberal
39th	2008–2012	Nicole Ménard	Liberal
40th	2012–2014	Nicole Ménard	Liberal
41st	2014–2018	Nicole Ménard	Liberal
42nd	2018–2022	Nicole Ménard	Liberal
43rd	2022–2025	Isabelle Poulet	Coalition Avenir Québec
43rd	2025–2026	Isabelle Poulet	Independent
Pierre-Laporte
44th	2026–Present	David Bowles	Liberal

== Election results ==
2026 Quebec general election
** Preliminary results — Not yet official **
Party	Candidate	Votes	%	±%
Liberal	David Bowles	14,535	42.89	
Parti Québécois	Anne-Sophie Maguire Armand	7,367	21.74	
Québec solidaire	Claude Lefrançois	5,003	14.76	
Coalition Avenir Québec	Mélanie Martin	3,160	9.32	
Conservative	Mi Jie	3,110	9.18	
Green	Yahia Ghzala	311	0.92	
Canadian	Michael Douris	197	0.58	
Climat Québec	Stéphane Bilodeau	166	0.49	
Équipe Autonomiste	Florent Portron	43	0.13	
Total valid votes				
Total rejected ballots				
Turnout			64.53	
Electors on the lists			–	–
Liberal gain from Coalition Avenir Québec		Swing		+
Source: Élections Québec

2022 Quebec general election: Laporte
Party	Candidate	Votes	%	±%
Coalition Avenir Québec	Isabelle Poulet	10,361	30.76	+2.20
Liberal	Mathieu Gratton	9,707	28.82	-6.80
Québec solidaire	Claude Lefrançois	5,968	17.72	+0.62
Parti Québécois	Soledad Orihuela-Bouchard	4,108	12.19	-1.03
Conservative	Evelyne Latreille	2,488	7.39	+6.03
Green	Jean-Philippe Charest	497	1.48	-1.31
Canadian	Herby Fremont	445	1.32	
Climat Québec	Ian Parent	113	0.34	
Total valid votes		33,687	98.84	
Total rejected ballots		394	1.16	-0.36
Turnout		34,081	64.04	-2.25
Electors on the lists		53,217		
Coalition Avenir Québec gain from Liberal		Swing		+4.50

2018 Quebec general election: Laporte
Party	Candidate	Votes	%	±%
Liberal	Nicole Ménard	12,514	35.61	-12.04
Coalition Avenir Québec	Jacinthe-Eve Arel	10,035	28.56	+10.71
Québec solidaire	Claude Lefrançois	6,007	17.10	+9.47
Parti Québécois	Annie Lessard	4,647	13.22	-10.90
Green	Sabrina Huet-Côté	980	2.79	+1.06
New Democratic	Marc André Audet	480	1.37	
Conservative	Linda Therrien	475	1.35	+0.88
Total valid votes		35,138	98.49	
Total rejected ballots		540	1.51	+0.25
Turnout		35,678	66.29	-6.75
Eligible voters		53,823		
Liberal hold		Swing		-11.38
Source(s) "Rapport des résultats officiels du scrutin". Élections Québec.

2012 Quebec general election
Party	Candidate	Votes	%	±%
Liberal	Nicole Ménard	12,827	37.19	-11.78
Parti Québécois	Simon Bélanger	10,752	31.18	-2.33
Coalition Avenir Québec	Donald LeBlanc	8,023	23.26	+13.82*
Québec solidaire	Michèle St-Denis	2,043	5.92	+2.28
Option nationale	Linda Dupuis	550	1.59	–
Conservative	Camil Lambert	291	0.84	–
Total valid votes		34,486	98.74	–
Total rejected ballots		440	1.26	–
Turnout		34,926	76.33	+18.28
Electors on the lists		45,754	–	–

* Result compared to Action démocratique

2008 Quebec general election
Party	Candidate	Votes	%	±%
Liberal	Nicole Ménard	12,823	48.97	+8.00
Parti Québécois	Robert Pellan	8,765	33.51	+8.35
Action démocratique	Alain Dépatie	2,472	9.44	-14.37
Green	Richard Morisset	1,162	4.44	-1.74
Québec solidaire	Michèle St-Denis	954	3.64	-0.24
Total valid votes		26,186	98.54	–
Total rejected ballots		387	1.46	–
Turnout		26,573	58.05	-12.87
Electors on the lists		45,776	–	–

2007 Quebec general election
Party	Candidate	Votes	%	±%
Liberal	Nicole Ménard	13,249	40.97	-14.25
Parti Québécois	Robert Pellan	8,137	25.16	-4.94
Action démocratique	Michel Beaudoin	7,699	23.81	+12.32
Green	Richard Morisset	1,998	6.18	–
Québec solidaire	Michèle St-Denis	1,256	3.88	+2.43*
Total valid votes		32,339	99.02	–
Total rejected ballots		320	0.98	–
Turnout		32,659	70.92	-0.88
Electors on the lists		46,048	–	–

* Result compared to UFP

2003 Quebec general election
Party	Candidate	Votes	%	±%
Liberal	Michel Audet	18,673	55.22	+2.37
Parti Québécois	Clément Arcand	10,178	30.10	-5.59
Action démocratique	Judy Fay	3,885	11.49	+2.23
UFP	Christian Montmarquette	489	1.45	–
Bloc Pot	Patrick Fiset	487	1.44	–
Equality	Mary Bevan Ouellette	106	0.31	-0.20

1995 Quebec referendum
Side	Votes	%
No	25,140	59,03
Yes	17,447	40.97

1980 Quebec referendum
Side	Votes	%
No	20,692	50.76
Yes	20,072	49.24

== See also ==
- List of Quebec provincial electoral districts
- Canadian provincial electoral districts
