= Henri-François Gautrin =

Canadian politician

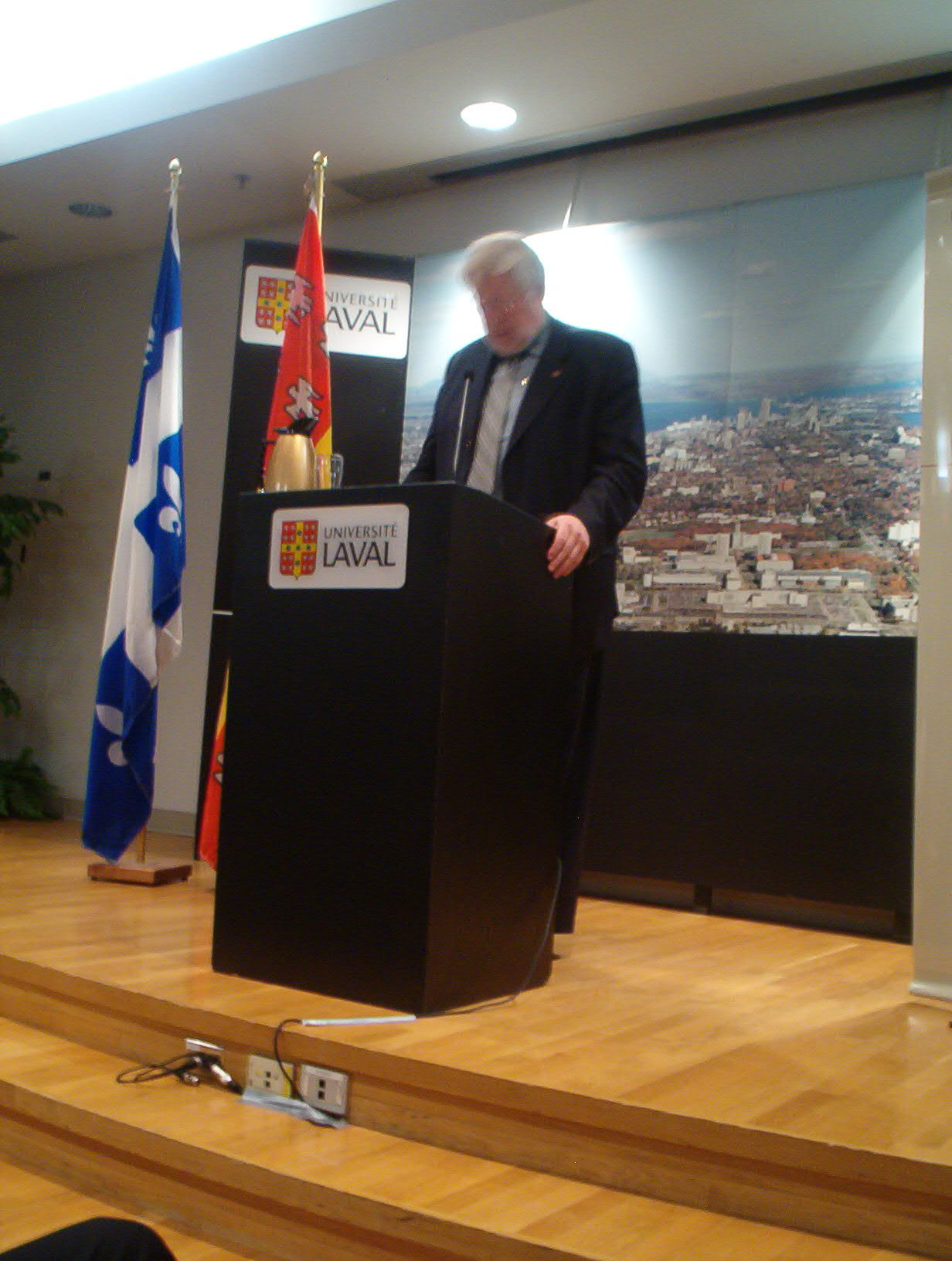

Member of the National Assembly of Quebec for Verdun
- In office September 25, 1989 – April 23, 2014
- Preceded by: Paul Gobeil
- Succeeded by: Jacques Daoust

Personal details
- Born: July 30, 1943 (age 82) Béthune, France
- Party: Quebec Liberal Party
- Profession: Professor, Physicist
- Cabinet: Deputy House Leader of the Government

Henri-François Gautrin (born July 30, 1943 in Béthune, France) is a Quebec politician, professor and physicist. He was the Member of National Assembly of Quebec for the riding of Verdun in the Montreal region. He represented the Quebec Liberal Party and was the former Minister of Governmental Services from February 2006 to February 2007.

== Biography ==
Gautrin went to Collège Stanislas before going to the Université de Montréal where he obtained a bachelor's degree in sciences. He later obtained a master's degree in sciences at McGill University before heading to the Université de Dijon in France in 1971 where he received a State doctor's degree. He also studied economics and public finance in Paris.

He was a professor in the mathematics department at the Université de Montréal since 1969. In addition to his teaching duties at that university, he was also an administration staff member and a member of the executive committee.

He was also active in politics as the leader of the New Democratic Party of Quebec from 1973 to 1979 and was the president of the NO committee in the Taillon riding in the 1980 referendum. He was then a candidate for the Liberals in the 1981 elections in the riding of Dorion, where he was defeated.

Gautrin was elected in Verdun in the 1989 elections where he was named the Caucus chair of the MNAs in Western Montreal and was briefly the Parliamentary Secretary to the Minister of Education before the Liberals were defeated by the Parti Québécois. He was re-elected for two other terms as an MNA for the opposition party in 1994 and 1998.

When the Liberals returned to power in 2003, Gautrin was named the Parliamentary secretary to Premier Jean Charest from 2003 to 2005. In 2005, he was named the Online Government Minister and in 2006 the Minister of Governmental Services. After being re-elected in 2007, he was named the Assistant House Leader of the Government and parliamentary assistant to the Premier. He was re-elected in the 2008 Quebec general election.

== Electoral record (partial) ==
2008 Quebec general election: Verdun
Party	Candidate	Votes	%	±%
Liberal	Henri-François Gautrin (incumbent)	11,223	47.70	+6.76
Parti Québécois	Richard Langlais	8,314	35.34	+6.19
Action démocratique	Moscou Côté	1,411	6.00	-11.58
Québec solidaire	Chantal Michaud	1,215	5.16	+0.36
Green	Sébastien Beausoleil	1,087	4.62	-1.65
Independent	Sylvie R. Tremblay	216	0.92	
Independent	Robert Lindblad	61	0.26	-0.01
Total valid votes		23,527	100.00	
Rejected and declined votes		310		
Turnout		23,837	50.62	-13.83
Electors on the lists		47,089		
Source: Official Results (2008 election), Le Directeur général des élections du Québec.

2007 Quebec general election: Verdun
Party	Candidate	Votes	%	±%
Liberal	Henri-François Gautrin (incumbent)	12,204	40.94	−11.58
Parti Québécois	Richard Langlais	8,688	29.15	-1.23
Action démocratique	Sylvie Tremblay	5,239	17.58	+6.27
Green	Pierre-Yves McSween	1,868	6.27	+3.99
Québec solidaire	David Fennario	1,430	4.80	+3.53
Christian Democracy	Gilles Noël	118	0.40	+0.04
Bloc Pot	Sala Samghour	106	0.36	−0.87
Independent	Robert Lindblad	80	0.27	+0.08
Marxist–Leninist	Normand Fournier	74	0.25	Even
Total valid votes		29,807	100.00	
Rejected and declined votes		302		
Turnout		30,109	64.45	+1.44
Electors on the lists		46,714		
Source: Official Results (2007 election), Le Directeur général des élections du Québec.

2003 Quebec general election: Verdun
Party	Candidate	Votes	%
Liberal	Henri-François Gautrin	15,185	52.52
Parti Québécois	Denis Martel	8,782	30.38
Action démocratique	Sébastien Guérin	3,269	11.31
Green	Claude Genest	658	2.28
UFP	Pascal Durand	368	1.27
Bloc Pot	Vincent Aubry	357	1.23
Christian Democracy	Gilles Noël	104	0.36
Marxist–Leninist	Normand Chouinard	71	0.25
Equality	Bernard King	63	0.22
Independent	Robert Lindbald	54	0.19
Total valid votes		28,911	100.00
Rejected and declined votes		391	
Turnout		29,302	63.01
Electors on the lists		46,502	
Source: Official Results, Le Directeur général des élections du Québec.

1989 Quebec general election: Verdun
Party	Candidate	Votes	%	±%
Liberal	Henri-François Gautrin	8,295	38.58	−25.69
Parti Québécois	Maurice Roch	6,928	32.22	+2.35
Equality	Roger Mercure	4,857	22.59	–
Green	Andrew Ferguson	664	3.09	–
New Democratic	Jean-François Moisan	387	1.80	−1.05
Workers	Raymond Lemay	266	1.24	–
Marxist–Leninist	Claude Brunelle	106	0.49	–
Total valid votes		21,503	96.97	–
Rejected and declined votes		673	3.03	–
Turnout		22,176	75.27	+1.46
Electors on the lists		29,461	–	–
Source: Official Results, Le Directeur général des élections du Québec.

1981 Quebec general election: Dorion
Party	Candidate	Votes	%
Parti Québécois	Huguette Lachapelle	14,551	51.54
Liberal	Henri-François Gautrin	12,657	44.83
Union Nationale	François Lefebvre	524	1.86
Workers Communist	Suzanne Barbeau Foisy	161	0.57
Workers	Gilles Frenière	114	0.40
Marxist–Leninist	Ginette Boutet	88	0.31
Independent	Raymond Beaudoin	74	0.26
United Social Credit	Fernand Bélisle	66	0.23
Total valid votes		28,235	100.00
Rejected and declined votes		666	
Turnout		28,901	82.58
Electors on the lists		34,997	
Source: Official Results, Le Directeur général des élections du Québec.

Political offices
Preceded by Pierre Reid	Minister of Government Services; 2006–2007	Succeeded by Monique Jerome-Forget
