= Results breakdown of the 2011 Canadian federal election =

Results of the 41st Canadian federal election

2011 Canadian federal election
← 2008	2 May 2011	2015 →
- Turnout: 61.1%
Party	Leader	Vote %	Seats	+/–
Conservative	Stephen Harper	39.6%	166	+23
New Democratic	Jack Layton	30.6%	103	+67
Liberal	Michael Ignatieff	18.9%	34	−43
Bloc Québécois	Gilles Duceppe	6.0%	4	−43
Green	Elizabeth May	3.9%	1	+1
This lists parties that won seats. See the complete results below.
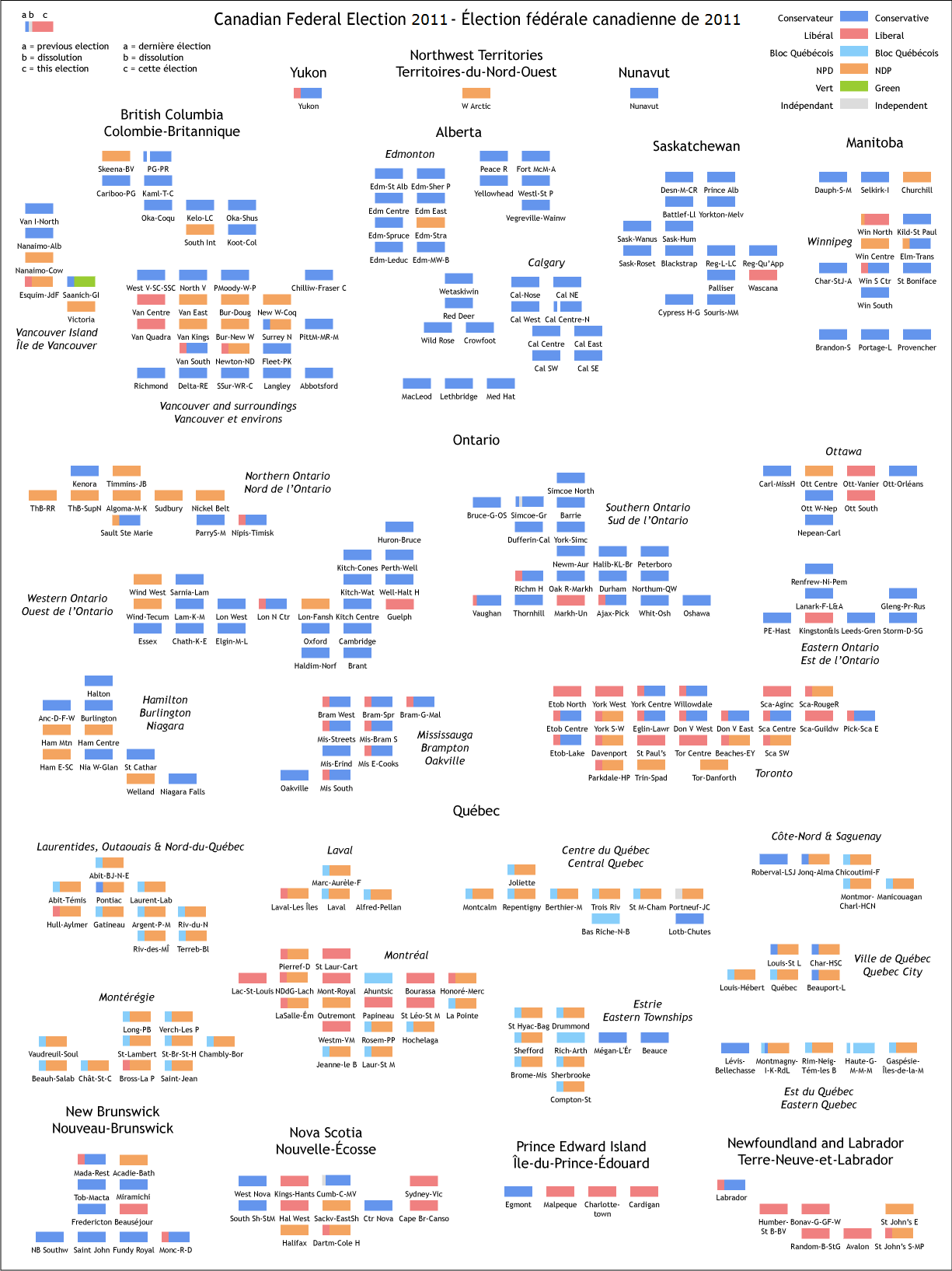
Analysis of results by riding, together with comparisons from previous election and at dissolution.
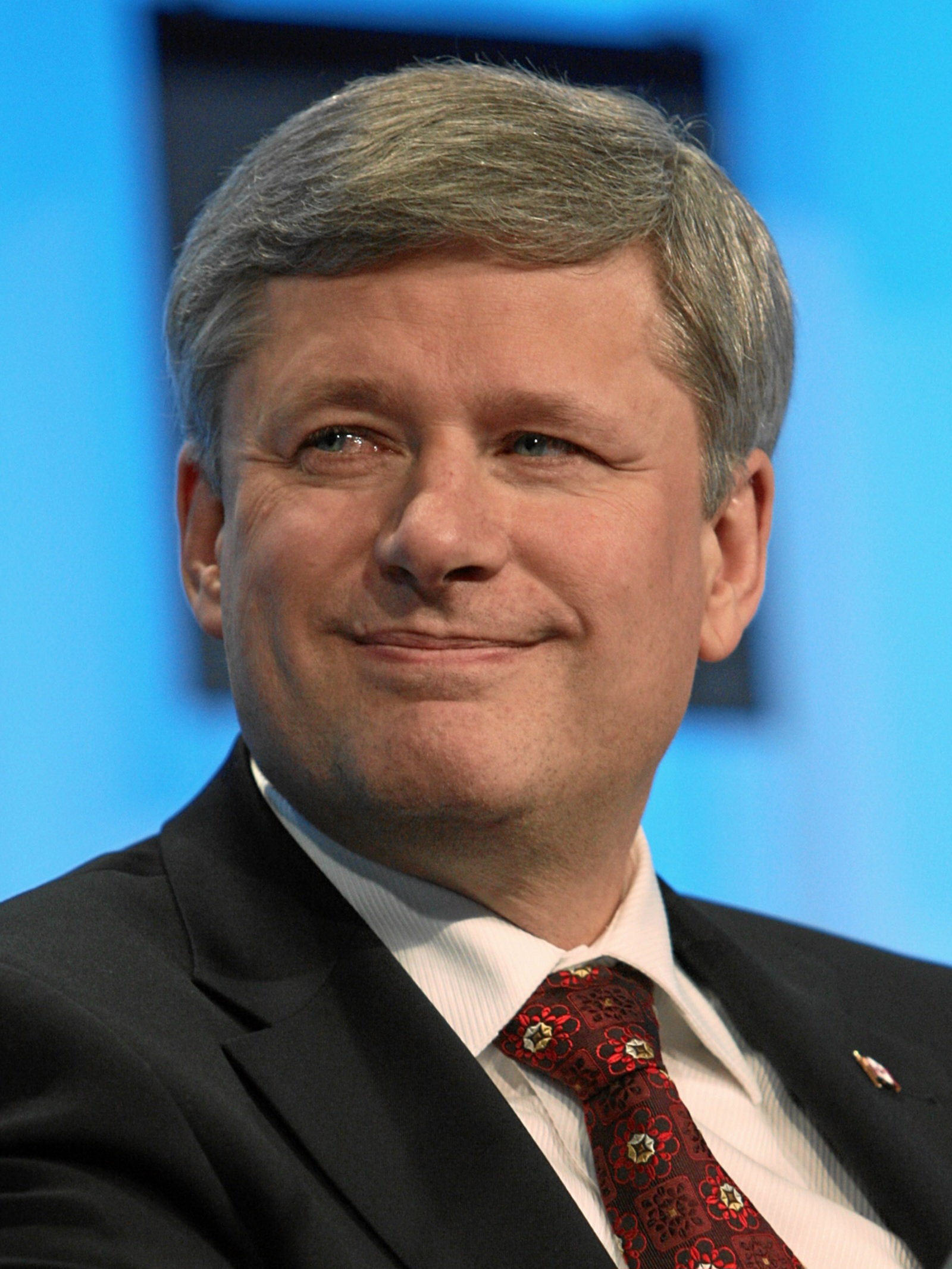

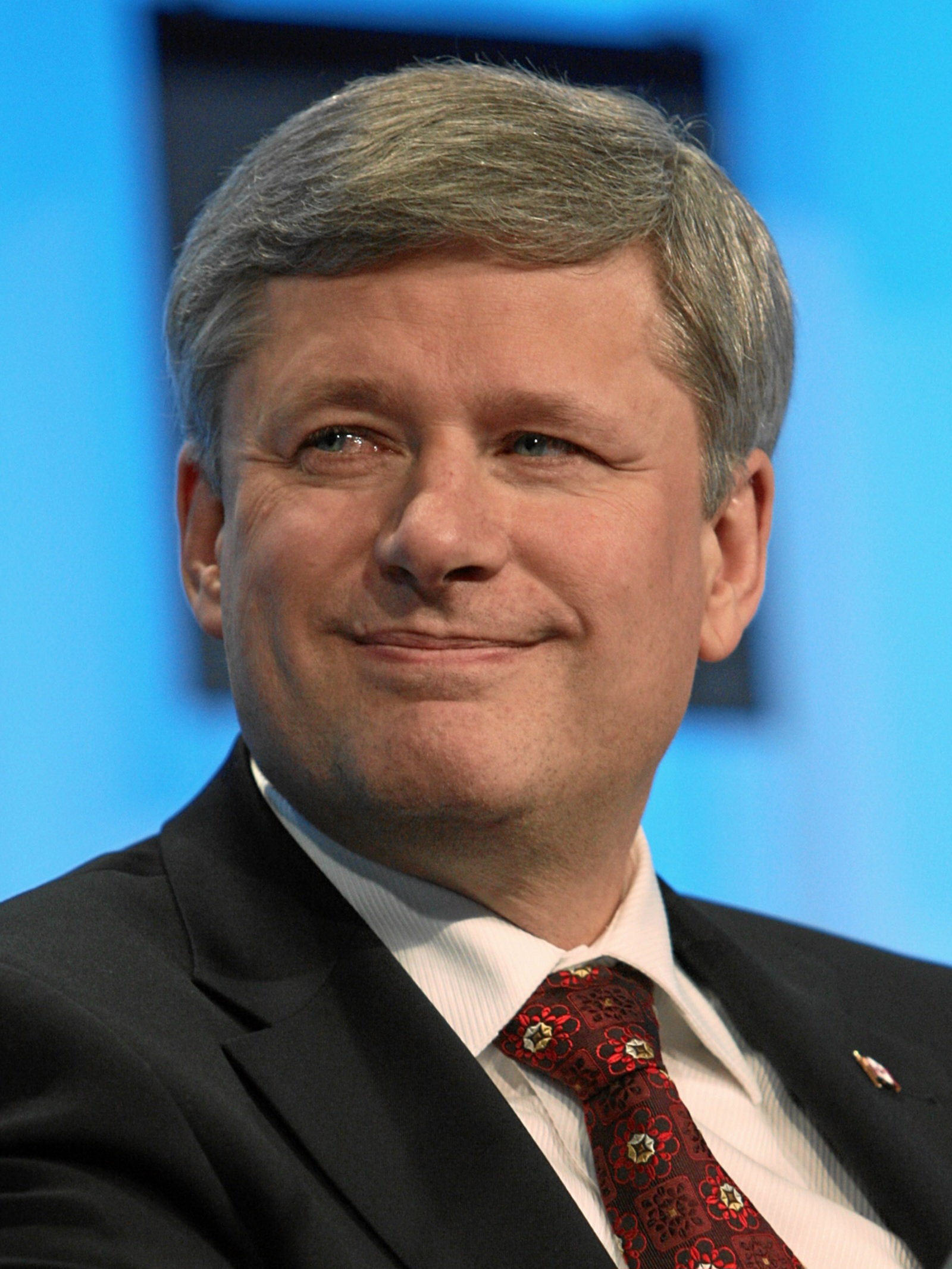
Prime Minister before	Prime Minister after
Stephen Harper; Conservative	Stephen Harper; Conservative

The 41st Canadian federal election was held on May 2, 2011. It resulted in a Conservative majority government under the leadership of Prime Minister Stephen Harper. It was the third consecutive election win for Harper, and with 166 of 308 seats, giving them a majority government for the first time in their eight-year history. It was also the first right-of-centre majority government since the Progressive Conservatives won their last majority in 1988. The Conservative Party won 39.62% of the popular vote, an increase of 1.96%, and posted a net gain of 24 seats in the House of Commons.

The election resulted in significant upheaval within the opposition parties, as the New Democratic Party (NDP) rode an "orange surge" in the polls during the campaign to 103 seats, becoming Her Majesty's Loyal Opposition for the first time in party history. The total eclipsed the party's previous best of 43 seats in 1988. The Liberals, however, were reduced to third party status nationwide, returning only 34 MPs—less than half of what they had at dissolution. It was the first time in Canadian history that the Liberals were not one of the top two parties in the house. Green Party leader Elizabeth May won in her riding, becoming the first Green Party candidate elected to a governmental body in Canada, and to a national body in North America.

Following their staggering defeats, including losing their own seats, Bloc Québécois leader Gilles Duceppe and Liberal leader Michael Ignatieff both announced their resignations as party leaders.

== Vote total ==
Rendition of party representation in the 41st Canadian Parliament decided by this election. Conservatives (166) New Democrats (103) Liberals (34) Bloc Québécois (4) Green Party (1)

National Results (Preliminary)
Party	Seats	Votes	%	+/-
Conservative	166	5,832,560	39.62	+1.97
New Democratic	103	4,508,474	30.63	+12.44
Liberal	34	2,783,175	18.91	-7.36
Bloc Québécois	4	889,788	6.04	-3.93
Green	1	576,221	3.91	-2.86
Independent	0	63,340	0.43	-0.22
Christian Heritage	0	19,218	0.131	-0.061
Marxist–Leninist	0	10,160	0.069	+0.007
No affiliation	0	9,391	0.064	+0.024
Libertarian	0	6,017	0.041	-0.012
Progressive Canadian	0	5,838	0.040	-0.003
Rhinoceros	0	3,819	0.026	+0.011
Pirate	0	3,198	0.022	*
Communist	0	2,925	0.020	-0.006
Canadian Action	0	2,030	0.0138	-0.0112
Marijuana	0	1,864	0.0127	-0.0039
Animal Alliance	0	1,451	0.0099	+0.0060
Western Block	0	748	0.0051	+0.0037
United	0	294	0.0020	*
First Peoples National	0	228	0.00155	-0.01010
Total	308	14,720,580	100.00	

Popular support based on winning and losing candidates (based on certified results - except Nunavut and Skeena-Bulkley Valley)
Party	Winners	Votes	Party %	Total %	Losers	Votes	Party %	Total %
Conservative	166	4,380,401	74.91%	58.98%	141	1,467,337	25.09%	20.11%
New Democratic	103	2,378,632	52.49%	32.03%	205	2,153,097	47.51%	29.50%
Liberal	34	571,379	20.52%	7.69%	274	2,213,095	79.48%	30.33%
Bloc Québécois	4	64,620	7.25%	0.87%	71	826,809	92.75%	11.33%
Green	1	31,890	5.56%	0.43%	303	541,318	94.44%	7.42%
Other	0	0	0.00%	0.00%	285	95,790	100.00%	1.31%
Totals	308	7,426,922	50.44%	100.00%	1,279	7,297,446	49.56%	100.00%

== Synopsis of results ==
Results by riding - 2011 Canadian federal election
Prov/ Terr	Riding	2008	Winning party					Turnout (Note: including spoilt ballots)	Votes (Note: minor political parties receiving less than 1% of the national popular vote are aggregated under "Other"; independent candidates are aggregated separately)							
Prov/ Terr	Riding	Party	Party	Votes	Share	Margin #	Margin %	Turnout	Con	NDP	Lib	BQ	Green	Ind	Other	Total (Note: valid ballots)
AB	Calgary Centre-North	Con	Con	28,443	56.53%	20,395	40.53%	59.71%	28,443	8,048	7,046	–	6,578	–	203	50,318
AB	Calgary Centre	Con	Con	28,401	57.68%	19,770	40.15%	55.28%	28,401	7,314	8,631	–	4,889	–	–	49,235
AB	Calgary East	Con	Con	23,372	67.43%	18,478	53.31%	45.94%	23,372	4,894	4,102	–	2,047	–	246	34,661
AB	Calgary Northeast	Con	Con	23,550	56.80%	12,063	29.10%	47.80%	23,550	4,262	11,487	–	1,953	–	206	41,458
AB	Calgary Southeast	Con	Con	48,173	76.26%	41,691	66.00%	59.47%	48,173	6,482	4,020	–	4,079	225	193	63,172
AB	Calgary Southwest	Con	Con	42,998	75.12%	36,175	63.20%	60.42%	42,998	6,823	4,121	–	2,991	303	–	57,236
AB	Calgary West	Con	Con	39,996	62.16%	28,622	44.48%	62.31%	39,996	6,679	11,374	–	6,070	–	227	64,346
AB	Calgary—Nose Hill	Con	Con	40,384	70.17%	33,195	57.68%	56.64%	40,384	7,189	6,501	–	3,480	–	–	57,554
AB	Crowfoot	Con	Con	44,115	83.99%	39,310	74.84%	59.24%	44,115	4,805	1,224	–	1,711	463	204	52,522
AB	Edmonton Centre	Con	Con	23,625	48.03%	11,145	22.66%	57.16%	23,625	12,480	11,037	–	1,676	–	370	49,188
AB	Edmonton East	Con	Con	24,111	52.75%	7,033	15.39%	49.62%	24,111	17,078	3,176	–	1,345	–	–	45,710
AB	Edmonton—Leduc	Con	Con	37,778	63.57%	26,290	44.24%	58.68%	37,778	11,488	7,270	–	2,896	–	–	59,432
AB	Edmonton—Mill Woods—Beaumont	Con	Con	27,857	61.04%	16,982	37.21%	52.96%	27,857	10,875	5,066	–	1,364	–	474	45,636
AB	Edmonton—Sherwood Park	Con	Con	24,623	44.66%	8,360	15.16%	58.44%	24,623	7,971	4,131	–	1,926	16,263	222	55,136
AB	Edmonton—Spruce Grove	Con	Con	41,782	71.10%	32,510	55.32%	55.79%	41,782	9,272	5,483	–	2,232	–	–	58,769
AB	Edmonton—St. Albert	Con	Con	34,468	63.46%	22,824	42.02%	55.86%	34,468	11,644	5,796	–	2,409	–	–	54,317
AB	Edmonton—Strathcona	NDP	NDP	26,093	53.55%	6,331	12.99%	66.52%	19,762	26,093	1,372	–	1,119	293	91	48,730
AB	Fort McMurray—Athabasca	Con	Con	21,988	71.84%	17,935	58.60%	40.30%	21,988	4,053	3,190	–	1,374	–	–	30,605
AB	Lethbridge	Con	Con	27,173	56.51%	14,101	29.32%	53.75%	27,173	13,072	4,030	–	2,095	–	1,716	48,086
AB	Macleod	Con	Con	40,007	77.48%	34,672	67.15%	60.42%	40,007	5,335	1,898	–	2,389	–	2,006	51,635
AB	Medicine Hat	Con	Con	30,719	71.55%	25,103	58.47%	52.13%	30,719	5,616	4,416	–	1,868	–	317	42,936
AB	Peace River	Con	Con	36,334	75.76%	28,594	59.62%	49.00%	36,334	7,740	1,481	–	1,702	359	345	47,961
AB	Red Deer	Con	Con	37,959	75.93%	30,393	60.79%	53.47%	37,959	7,566	1,918	–	2,551	–	–	49,994
AB	Vegreville—Wainwright	Con	Con	39,145	79.79%	33,584	68.46%	58.67%	39,145	5,561	1,525	–	2,499	–	327	49,057
AB	Westlock—St. Paul	Con	Con	32,652	77.82%	27,549	65.66%	55.21%	32,652	5,103	2,569	–	1,634	–	–	41,958
AB	Wetaskiwin	Con	Con	37,756	81.44%	32,475	70.05%	57.92%	37,756	5,281	1,348	–	1,978	–	–	46,363
AB	Wild Rose	Con	Con	43,669	74.74%	37,074	63.46%	61.23%	43,669	6,595	3,908	–	4,071	–	181	58,424
AB	Yellowhead	Con	Con	31,925	77.03%	26,514	63.97%	55.13%	31,925	5,411	1,190	–	2,132	–	788	41,446
BC	Abbotsford	Con	Con	32,493	65.02%	22,404	44.83%	58.96%	32,493	10,089	4,968	–	2,138	–	286	49,974
BC	British Columbia Southern Interior	NDP	NDP	25,206	50.92%	5,933	11.98%	65.58%	19,273	25,206	1,872	–	3,153	–	–	49,504
BC	Burnaby—Douglas	NDP	NDP	20,943	43.00%	1,011	2.08%	57.63%	19,932	20,943	5,451	–	1,754	–	630	48,710
BC	Burnaby—New Westminster	NDP	NDP	22,193	49.67%	6,184	13.84%	53.25%	16,009	22,193	4,496	–	1,731	–	254	44,683
BC	Cariboo—Prince George	Con	Con	24,443	56.17%	11,308	25.98%	57.32%	24,443	13,135	2,200	–	2,702	394	644	43,518
BC	Chilliwack—Fraser Canyon	Con	Con	28,160	57.20%	15,469	31.42%	58.14%	28,160	12,691	5,320	–	2,706	–	353	49,230
BC	Delta—Richmond East	Con	Con	26,059	54.24%	14,878	30.97%	59.65%	26,059	11,181	8,112	–	2,324	220	147	48,043
BC	Esquimalt—Juan de Fuca	Lib	NDP	26,198	40.87%	406	0.63%	65.24%	25,792	26,198	6,439	–	5,341	181	145	64,096
BC	Fleetwood—Port Kells	Con	Con	23,950	47.55%	7,417	14.73%	52.86%	23,950	16,533	8,041	–	1,476	–	370	50,370
BC	Kamloops—Thompson—Cariboo	Con	Con	29,682	52.24%	8,699	15.31%	62.71%	29,682	20,983	3,026	–	2,932	–	191	56,814
BC	Kelowna—Lake Country	Con	Con	34,566	57.40%	21,244	35.28%	59.84%	34,566	13,322	7,069	–	5,265	–	–	60,222
BC	Kootenay—Columbia	Con	Con	23,910	55.88%	9,711	22.70%	63.45%	23,910	14,199	1,496	–	2,547	636	–	42,788
BC	Langley	Con	Con	35,569	64.52%	24,292	44.06%	61.28%	35,569	11,277	4,990	–	2,943	–	353	55,132
BC	Nanaimo—Alberni	Con	Con	30,469	46.42%	5,304	8.08%	66.70%	30,469	25,165	4,984	–	4,482	–	538	65,638
BC	Nanaimo—Cowichan	NDP	NDP	31,272	48.90%	6,775	10.59%	64.20%	24,497	31,272	3,007	–	5,005	–	170	63,951
BC	New Westminster—Coquitlam	NDP	NDP	23,023	45.93%	2,247	4.48%	59.61%	20,776	23,023	4,069	–	2,160	–	95	50,123
BC	Newton—North Delta	Lib	NDP	15,413	33.42%	903	1.96%	61.45%	14,437	15,413	14,510	–	1,520	123	116	46,119
BC	North Vancouver	Con	Con	28,996	48.62%	11,331	19.00%	66.86%	28,996	9,617	17,665	–	3,004	350	–	59,632
BC	Okanagan—Coquihalla	Con	Con	28,525	53.58%	15,672	29.44%	61.90%	28,525	12,853	5,815	–	5,005	1,040	–	53,238
BC	Okanagan—Shuswap	Con	Con	31,439	55.45%	16,484	29.07%	61.94%	31,439	14,955	4,246	–	6,058	–	–	56,698
BC	Pitt Meadows—Maple Ridge—Mission	Con	Con	28,803	54.34%	9,968	18.81%	59.33%	28,803	18,835	2,739	–	2,629	–	–	53,006
BC	Port Moody—Westwood—Port Coquitlam	Con	Con	27,181	56.07%	12,581	25.95%	56.46%	27,181	14,600	4,110	–	2,161	–	421	48,473
BC	Prince George—Peace River	Con	Con	23,946	62.12%	14,070	36.50%	53.28%	23,946	9,876	2,008	–	2,301	–	415	38,546
BC	Richmond	Con	Con	25,109	58.36%	17,082	39.70%	50.50%	25,109	7,860	8,027	–	2,032	–	–	43,028
BC	Saanich—Gulf Islands	Con	Grn	31,890	46.33%	7,346	10.67%	73.88%	24,544	8,185	4,208	–	31,890	–	–	68,827
BC	Skeena—Bulkley Valley	NDP	NDP	19,431	55.33%	7,314	20.83%	57.72%	12,117	19,431	1,268	–	1,102	–	1,203	35,121
BC	South Surrey—White Rock—Cloverdale	Con	Con	31,990	54.55%	20,109	34.29%	64.27%	31,990	11,881	9,775	–	3,245	1,094	657	58,642
BC	Surrey North	Con	NDP	14,678	39.69%	1,497	4.05%	51.63%	13,181	14,678	6,797	–	1,289	451	587	36,983
BC	Vancouver Centre	Lib	Lib	18,260	31.03%	2,935	4.99%	57.71%	15,323	15,325	18,260	–	9,089	–	852	58,849
BC	Vancouver East	NDP	NDP	27,794	62.83%	19,433	43.93%	54.42%	8,361	27,794	4,382	–	3,383	–	318	44,238
BC	Vancouver Island North	Con	Con	27,206	46.11%	1,827	3.10%	65.49%	27,206	25,379	3,039	–	3,018	304	57	59,003
BC	Vancouver Kingsway	NDP	NDP	23,452	50.08%	10,295	21.98%	57.06%	13,157	23,452	7,796	–	1,860	–	563	46,828
BC	Vancouver Quadra	Lib	Lib	22,903	42.17%	1,919	3.53%	62.43%	20,984	7,499	22,903	–	2,922	–	–	54,308
BC	Vancouver South	Lib	Con	19,504	43.31%	3,900	8.66%	54.92%	19,504	8,552	15,604	–	1,151	–	222	45,033
BC	Victoria	NDP	NDP	30,679	50.78%	16,404	27.15%	67.55%	14,275	30,679	8,448	–	7,015	–	–	60,417
BC	West Vancouver—Sunshine Coast—Sea to Sky Country	Con	Con	28,614	45.53%	13,786	21.93%	63.30%	28,614	14,828	14,123	–	4,436	–	850	62,851
MB	Brandon—Souris	Con	Con	22,386	63.73%	13,541	38.55%	57.54%	22,386	8,845	1,882	–	2,012	–	–	35,125
MB	Charleswood—St. James—Assiniboia	Con	Con	23,264	57.56%	15,130	37.43%	64.77%	23,264	8,134	7,433	–	1,587	–	–	40,418
MB	Churchill	NDP	NDP	10,262	51.12%	5,006	24.94%	43.81%	5,256	10,262	4,087	–	471	–	–	20,076
MB	Dauphin—Swan River—Marquette	Con	Con	18,543	63.09%	10,886	37.04%	54.90%	18,543	7,657	1,947	–	1,243	–	–	29,390
MB	Elmwood—Transcona	NDP	Con	15,298	46.40%	300	0.91%	55.93%	15,298	14,998	1,660	–	1,017	–	–	32,973
MB	Kildonan—St. Paul	Con	Con	22,670	58.16%	10,943	28.07%	61.27%	22,670	11,727	3,199	–	1,020	363	–	38,979
MB	Portage—Lisgar	Con	Con	26,899	75.99%	23,421	66.16%	59.44%	26,899	3,478	2,221	–	1,996	–	805	35,399
MB	Provencher	Con	Con	27,820	70.60%	20,769	52.71%	61.73%	27,820	7,051	2,645	–	1,164	–	725	39,405
MB	Saint Boniface	Con	Con	21,737	50.28%	8,423	19.48%	66.17%	21,737	6,935	13,314	–	1,245	–	–	43,231
MB	Selkirk—Interlake	Con	Con	26,848	65.19%	15,915	38.64%	62.29%	26,848	10,933	1,980	–	1,423	–	–	41,184
MB	Winnipeg Centre	NDP	NDP	13,928	53.66%	6,755	26.03%	48.20%	7,173	13,928	2,872	–	1,830	–	152	25,955
MB	Winnipeg North	NDP	Lib	9,097	35.78%	44	0.17%	49.26%	6,701	9,053	9,097	–	458	–	118	25,427
MB	Winnipeg South	Con	Con	22,840	52.24%	8,544	19.54%	68.45%	22,840	5,693	14,296	–	889	–	–	43,718
MB	Winnipeg South Centre	Lib	Con	15,506	38.82%	722	1.81%	69.04%	15,506	7,945	14,784	–	1,383	321	–	39,939
NB	Acadie—Bathurst	NDP	NDP	32,067	69.69%	24,611	53.49%	70.30%	7,456	32,067	6,491	–	–	–	–	46,014
NB	Beauséjour	Lib	Lib	17,399	39.08%	2,588	5.81%	71.21%	14,811	10,397	17,399	–	1,913	–	–	44,520
NB	Fredericton	Con	Con	21,573	48.38%	10,947	24.55%	64.24%	21,573	10,626	10,336	–	1,790	266	–	44,591
NB	Fundy Royal	Con	Con	21,206	58.14%	11,361	31.15%	64.64%	21,206	9,845	3,668	–	1,757	–	–	36,476
NB	Madawaska—Restigouche	Lib	Con	14,224	40.64%	1,915	5.47%	69.80%	14,224	6,562	12,309	–	612	1,290	–	34,997
NB	Miramichi	Con	Con	16,112	52.41%	9,015	29.32%	71.40%	16,112	7,097	6,800	–	735	–	–	30,744
NB	Moncton—Riverview—Dieppe	Lib	Con	17,408	35.73%	2,161	4.44%	65.17%	17,408	14,053	15,247	–	2,016	–	–	48,724
NB	New Brunswick Southwest	Con	Con	18,066	56.64%	10,653	33.40%	64.71%	18,066	7,413	4,320	–	1,646	–	450	31,895
NB	Saint John	Con	Con	18,456	49.73%	7,074	19.06%	58.02%	18,456	11,382	5,964	–	1,017	294	–	37,113
NB	Tobique—Mactaquac	Con	Con	21,108	62.70%	14,720	43.73%	63.91%	21,108	6,388	5,337	–	831	–	–	33,664
NL	Avalon	Lib	Lib	16,008	43.97%	1,259	3.46%	56.77%	14,749	5,157	16,008	–	218	276	–	36,408
NL	Bonavista—Gander—Grand Falls—Windsor	Lib	Lib	17,977	57.70%	9,382	30.11%	44.77%	8,595	4,306	17,977	–	279	–	–	31,157
NL	Humber—St. Barbe—Baie Verte	Lib	Lib	17,119	57.04%	9,560	31.85%	50.94%	7,559	4,751	17,119	–	253	332	–	30,014
NL	Labrador	Lib	Con	4,256	39.81%	79	0.74%	52.91%	4,256	2,120	4,177	–	139	–	–	10,692
NL	Random—Burin—St. George's	Lib	Lib	12,914	49.65%	4,592	17.66%	45.40%	8,322	4,465	12,914	–	307	–	–	26,008
NL	St. John's East	NDP	NDP	31,388	71.22%	22,190	50.35%	57.85%	9,198	31,388	3,019	–	467	–	–	44,072
NL	St. John's South—Mount Pearl	Lib	NDP	18,681	47.92%	7,551	19.37%	58.33%	8,883	18,681	11,130	–	291	–	–	38,985
NS	Cape Breton—Canso	Lib	Lib	16,478	46.45%	5,605	15.80%	62.47%	10,873	6,984	16,478	–	1,141	–	–	35,476
NS	Central Nova	Con	Con	21,593	56.79%	12,181	32.03%	65.99%	21,593	9,412	5,614	–	1,406	–	–	38,025
NS	Cumberland—Colchester—Musquodoboit Valley	Ind	Con	21,041	52.46%	11,719	29.22%	58.34%	21,041	9,322	7,264	–	2,109	–	375	40,111
NS	Dartmouth—Cole Harbour	Lib	NDP	15,678	36.27%	497	1.15%	61.45%	10,702	15,678	15,181	–	1,662	–	–	43,223
NS	Halifax	NDP	NDP	23,746	51.64%	11,953	25.99%	63.02%	8,276	23,746	11,793	–	2,020	–	152	45,987
NS	Halifax West	Lib	Lib	16,230	35.92%	2,448	5.42%	62.34%	13,782	13,239	16,230	–	1,931	–	–	45,182
NS	Kings—Hants	Lib	Lib	15,887	39.56%	1,173	2.92%	61.76%	14,714	8,043	15,887	–	1,520	–	–	40,164
NS	Sackville—Eastern Shore	NDP	NDP	22,483	54.07%	9,821	23.62%	59.47%	12,662	22,483	4,673	–	1,762	–	–	41,580
NS	South Shore—St. Margaret's	Con	Con	17,948	43.15%	2,915	7.01%	62.23%	17,948	15,033	7,037	–	1,579	–	–	41,597
NS	Sydney—Victoria	Lib	Lib	14,788	39.91%	765	2.06%	61.48%	14,023	7,049	14,788	–	1,191	–	–	37,051
NS	West Nova	Con	Con	20,204	47.04%	4,572	10.64%	63.75%	20,204	5,631	15,632	–	1,487	–	–	42,954
ON	Ajax—Pickering	Lib	Con	24,797	44.07%	3,228	5.74%	60.34%	24,797	8,270	21,569	–	1,561	–	71	56,268
ON	Algoma—Manitoulin—Kapuskasing	NDP	NDP	18,747	51.73%	7,756	21.40%	61.88%	10,991	18,747	5,374	–	1,130	–	–	36,242
ON	Ancaster—Dundas—Flamborough—Westdale	Con	Con	30,240	51.25%	15,646	26.52%	68.52%	30,240	10,956	14,594	–	2,963	–	247	59,000
ON	Barrie	Con	Con	32,121	56.70%	20,279	35.80%	59.85%	32,121	11,842	9,113	–	3,266	–	309	56,651
ON	Beaches—East York	Lib	NDP	20,265	41.64%	5,298	10.89%	66.66%	11,067	20,265	14,967	–	2,240	–	130	48,669
ON	Bramalea—Gore—Malton	Lib	Con	19,907	34.44%	539	0.93%	53.56%	19,907	19,368	16,402	–	1,748	–	371	57,796
ON	Brampton West	Lib	Con	28,320	44.75%	6,192	9.78%	54.00%	28,320	11,225	22,128	–	1,224	387	–	63,284
ON	Brampton—Springdale	Lib	Con	24,618	48.26%	10,397	20.38%	57.71%	24,618	10,022	14,221	–	1,926	–	219	51,006
ON	Brant	Con	Con	28,045	48.90%	11,694	20.39%	60.30%	28,045	16,351	10,780	–	1,858	312	–	57,346
ON	Bruce—Grey—Owen Sound	Con	Con	28,744	56.30%	19,736	38.66%	64.12%	28,744	9,008	8,203	–	5,099	–	–	51,054
ON	Burlington	Con	Con	32,958	54.16%	18,804	30.90%	66.54%	32,958	11,449	14,154	–	2,151	–	140	60,852
ON	Cambridge	Con	Con	29,394	53.40%	14,156	25.72%	58.47%	29,394	15,238	8,285	–	1,978	–	153	55,048
ON	Carleton—Mississippi Mills	Con	Con	43,723	56.95%	25,330	32.99%	71.66%	43,723	11,223	18,393	–	3,434	–	–	76,773
ON	Chatham-Kent—Essex	Con	Con	23,360	53.76%	11,911	27.41%	58.83%	23,360	11,449	7,172	–	1,470	–	–	43,451
ON	Davenport	Lib	NDP	21,096	53.74%	10,150	25.86%	59.18%	5,573	21,096	10,946	–	1,344	–	295	39,254
ON	Don Valley East	Lib	Con	14,422	36.78%	870	2.22%	56.58%	14,422	9,878	13,552	–	1,114	–	246	39,212
ON	Don Valley West	Lib	Con	22,962	42.93%	611	1.14%	65.35%	22,962	6,280	22,351	–	1,703	–	186	53,482
ON	Dufferin—Caledon	Con	Con	28,647	59.01%	21,515	44.32%	60.05%	28,647	6,409	6,361	–	7,132	–	–	48,549
ON	Durham	Con	Con	31,737	54.55%	19,460	33.45%	63.21%	31,737	12,277	10,387	–	3,134	–	649	58,184
ON	Eglinton—Lawrence	Lib	Con	22,652	46.81%	4,062	8.39%	66.23%	22,652	5,613	18,590	–	1,534	–	–	48,389
ON	Elgin—Middlesex—London	Con	Con	29,147	57.55%	16,708	32.99%	62.23%	29,147	12,439	6,812	–	1,529	–	722	50,649
ON	Essex	Con	Con	25,327	48.06%	6,789	12.88%	58.54%	25,327	18,538	7,465	–	1,290	–	77	52,697
ON	Etobicoke Centre	Lib	Con	21,644	41.21%	26	0.05%	64.57%	21,644	7,735	21,618	–	1,377	–	149	52,523
ON	Etobicoke North	Lib	Lib	13,665	42.39%	3,308	10.26%	51.60%	10,357	7,630	13,665	–	–	–	583	32,235
ON	Etobicoke—Lakeshore	Lib	Con	21,997	40.35%	2,869	5.26%	62.81%	21,997	11,046	19,128	–	2,159	–	190	54,520
ON	Glengarry—Prescott—Russell	Con	Con	28,174	48.80%	10,469	18.13%	67.95%	28,174	9,608	17,705	–	2,049	–	194	57,730
ON	Guelph	Lib	Lib	25,588	43.35%	6,236	10.57%	64.92%	19,352	9,880	25,588	–	3,619	–	582	59,021
ON	Haldimand—Norfolk	Con	Con	25,655	50.94%	13,106	26.02%	62.78%	25,655	10,062	12,549	–	1,665	–	435	50,366
ON	Haliburton—Kawartha Lakes—Brock	Con	Con	35,192	60.03%	22,258	37.96%	63.05%	35,192	12,934	7,539	–	2,963	–	–	58,628
ON	Halton	Con	Con	44,214	54.52%	23,311	28.74%	61.70%	44,214	12,960	20,903	–	2,778	–	249	81,104
ON	Hamilton Centre	NDP	NDP	23,849	57.04%	12,829	30.68%	53.63%	11,020	23,849	5,912	–	–	–	1,032	41,813
ON	Hamilton East—Stoney Creek	NDP	NDP	21,931	45.18%	4,364	8.99%	57.06%	17,567	21,931	6,411	–	1,450	–	1,178	48,537
ON	Hamilton Mountain	NDP	NDP	25,595	47.17%	7,659	14.11%	61.05%	17,936	25,595	8,787	–	1,505	171	270	54,264
ON	Huron—Bruce	Con	Con	29,255	54.95%	15,762	29.61%	67.97%	29,255	13,493	8,784	–	1,455	254	–	53,241
ON	Kenora	Con	Con	11,567	47.05%	4,712	19.17%	58.77%	11,567	6,855	5,381	–	636	147	–	24,586
ON	Kingston and the Islands	Lib	Lib	23,842	39.31%	2,653	4.37%	63.38%	21,189	13,065	23,842	–	2,561	–	–	60,657
ON	Kitchener Centre	Con	Con	21,119	42.40%	5,527	11.10%	62.15%	21,119	10,742	15,592	–	1,972	199	185	49,809
ON	Kitchener—Conestoga	Con	Con	28,902	54.12%	17,237	32.28%	60.36%	28,902	11,665	10,653	–	2,184	–	–	53,404
ON	Kitchener—Waterloo	Con	Con	27,039	40.85%	2,144	3.24%	69.19%	27,039	10,606	24,895	–	3,158	174	311	66,183
ON	Lambton—Kent—Middlesex	Con	Con	29,546	57.68%	17,247	33.67%	64.51%	29,546	12,299	7,264	–	1,701	–	413	51,223
ON	Lanark—Frontenac—Lennox and Addington	Con	Con	33,754	57.27%	21,580	36.61%	64.63%	33,754	12,174	9,940	–	2,702	370	–	58,940
ON	Leeds—Grenville	Con	Con	29,991	60.81%	20,958	42.49%	64.42%	29,991	9,033	7,839	–	2,460	–	–	49,323
ON	London North Centre	Lib	Con	19,468	36.96%	1,665	3.16%	59.79%	19,468	12,996	17,803	–	2,177	–	229	52,673
ON	London West	Con	Con	27,675	44.49%	11,023	17.72%	66.53%	27,675	16,109	16,652	–	1,703	–	65	62,204
ON	London—Fanshawe	NDP	NDP	21,689	50.90%	7,395	17.35%	57.03%	14,294	21,689	4,893	–	1,202	–	535	42,613
ON	Markham—Unionville	Lib	Lib	19,429	38.95%	1,695	3.40%	54.17%	17,734	10,897	19,429	–	1,597	–	231	49,888
ON	Mississauga East—Cooksville	Lib	Con	18,796	39.97%	676	1.44%	55.65%	18,796	8,836	18,120	–	1,032	–	241	47,025
ON	Mississauga South	Lib	Con	22,991	46.48%	4,598	9.30%	63.21%	22,991	6,354	18,393	–	1,532	194	–	49,464
ON	Mississauga—Brampton South	Lib	Con	23,632	44.72%	5,053	9.56%	56.28%	23,632	9,465	18,579	–	1,044	–	127	52,847
ON	Mississauga—Erindale	Con	Con	29,793	46.95%	8,252	13.00%	60.39%	29,793	10,327	21,541	–	1,694	–	99	63,454
ON	Mississauga—Streetsville	Lib	Con	22,104	43.86%	3,453	6.85%	57.85%	22,104	7,834	18,651	–	1,802	–	–	50,391
ON	Nepean—Carleton	Con	Con	43,477	54.45%	23,331	29.22%	71.19%	43,477	12,962	20,146	–	3,260	–	–	79,845
ON	Newmarket—Aurora	Con	Con	31,600	54.29%	17,692	30.40%	63.00%	31,600	8,886	13,908	–	2,628	–	1,180	58,202
ON	Niagara Falls	Con	Con	28,748	53.26%	16,067	29.76%	56.40%	28,748	12,681	10,206	–	2,086	–	259	53,980
ON	Niagara West—Glanbrook	Con	Con	33,701	57.25%	20,967	35.62%	65.79%	33,701	12,734	8,699	–	2,530	–	1,199	58,863
ON	Nickel Belt	NDP	NDP	24,566	54.97%	12,063	26.99%	62.06%	12,503	24,566	6,308	–	1,252	–	59	44,688
ON	Nipissing—Timiskaming	Lib	Con	15,495	36.66%	18	0.04%	60.06%	15,495	8,781	15,477	–	2,518	–	–	42,271
ON	Northumberland—Quinte West	Con	Con	32,853	53.83%	20,031	32.82%	63.67%	32,853	12,626	12,822	–	2,733	–	–	61,034
ON	Oak Ridges—Markham	Con	Con	46,241	51.12%	20,680	22.86%	59.03%	46,241	15,229	25,561	–	2,349	–	1,080	90,460
ON	Oakville	Con	Con	30,068	51.65%	12,178	20.92%	67.98%	30,068	8,117	17,890	–	2,140	–	–	58,215
ON	Oshawa	Con	Con	26,034	51.31%	6,822	13.45%	56.82%	26,034	19,212	3,536	–	1,631	–	321	50,734
ON	Ottawa Centre	NDP	NDP	33,805	52.11%	19,742	30.43%	72.37%	14,063	33,805	13,049	–	3,262	210	479	64,868
ON	Ottawa South	Lib	Lib	25,963	44.01%	6,329	10.73%	67.82%	19,634	10,712	25,963	–	1,787	–	895	58,991
ON	Ottawa West—Nepean	Con	Con	25,226	44.71%	7,436	13.18%	68.44%	25,226	11,128	17,790	–	2,279	–	–	56,423
ON	Ottawa—Vanier	Lib	Lib	20,009	38.17%	4,618	8.81%	71.71%	14,184	15,391	20,009	–	2,716	–	122	52,422
ON	Ottawa—Orléans	Con	Con	28,584	44.55%	3,935	6.13%	66.50%	28,584	9,086	24,649	–	1,839	–	–	64,158
ON	Oxford	Con	Con	27,973	58.90%	15,809	33.29%	61.88%	27,973	12,164	4,521	–	2,058	–	776	47,492
ON	Parkdale—High Park	Lib	NDP	24,046	47.20%	7,289	14.31%	68.71%	7,924	24,046	16,757	–	1,666	–	552	50,945
ON	Parry Sound-Muskoka	Con	Con	25,864	55.73%	14,647	31.56%	65.11%	25,864	11,217	5,330	–	3,776	168	54	46,409
ON	Perth Wellington	Con	Con	25,281	54.48%	15,420	33.23%	63.47%	25,281	9,861	8,341	–	2,112	–	806	46,401
ON	Peterborough	Con	Con	29,393	49.67%	14,670	24.79%	64.71%	29,393	14,723	12,664	–	2,105	189	104	59,178
ON	Pickering—Scarborough East	Lib	Con	19,220	40.11%	1,207	2.52%	61.24%	19,220	8,932	18,013	–	1,751	–	–	47,916
ON	Prince Edward—Hastings	Con	Con	29,062	53.25%	16,122	29.54%	61.40%	29,062	12,940	10,230	–	1,887	283	171	54,573
ON	Renfrew—Nipissing—Pembroke	Con	Con	27,462	53.43%	17,851	34.73%	65.85%	27,462	6,903	6,545	–	877	9,611	–	51,398
ON	Richmond Hill	Lib	Con	22,078	44.14%	4,407	8.81%	55.25%	22,078	8,433	17,671	–	1,832	–	–	50,014
ON	Sarnia—Lambton	Con	Con	26,112	52.58%	11,256	22.66%	62.58%	26,112	14,856	6,931	–	1,252	–	514	49,665
ON	Sault Ste. Marie	NDP	Con	18,328	41.44%	1,861	4.21%	64.19%	18,328	16,467	8,343	–	945	–	149	44,232
ON	Scarborough Centre	Lib	Con	13,498	35.55%	1,470	3.87%	54.34%	13,498	11,443	12,028	–	998	–	–	37,967
ON	Scarborough Southwest	Lib	NDP	14,119	35.05%	1,289	3.20%	58.37%	12,830	14,119	11,699	–	1,635	–	–	40,283
ON	Scarborough—Agincourt	Lib	Lib	18,498	45.39%	4,568	11.21%	56.03%	13,930	7,376	18,498	–	946	–	–	40,750
ON	Scarborough-Guildwood	Lib	Lib	13,849	36.20%	691	1.81%	56.76%	13,158	10,145	13,849	–	848	259	–	38,259
ON	Scarborough—Rouge River	Lib	NDP	18,935	40.62%	5,000	10.73%	54.98%	13,935	18,935	12,699	–	684	357	–	46,610
ON	Simcoe North	Con	Con	31,581	54.45%	20,066	34.60%	64.07%	31,581	11,515	11,090	–	3,489	–	322	57,997
ON	Simcoe—Grey	Con	Con	31,784	49.37%	20,599	32.00%	65.06%	31,784	11,185	8,207	–	3,482	8,714	1,001	64,373
ON	St. Catharines	Con	Con	25,571	50.86%	13,598	27.05%	60.50%	25,571	11,973	10,358	–	1,924	–	448	50,274
ON	St. Paul's	Lib	Lib	22,409	40.60%	4,545	8.23%	66.54%	17,864	12,124	22,409	–	2,495	–	303	55,195
ON	Stormont—Dundas—South Glengarry	Con	Con	29,538	62.12%	21,028	44.22%	62.09%	29,538	8,313	8,510	–	1,038	–	151	47,550
ON	Sudbury	NDP	NDP	22,684	49.92%	9,803	21.57%	63.35%	12,881	22,684	8,172	–	1,359	116	229	45,441
ON	Thornhill	Con	Con	36,629	61.38%	22,504	37.71%	60.03%	36,629	7,141	14,125	–	1,562	–	215	59,672
ON	Thunder Bay—Rainy River	NDP	NDP	18,085	48.67%	7,988	21.50%	59.41%	10,097	18,085	8,067	–	909	–	–	37,158
ON	Thunder Bay—Superior North	NDP	NDP	18,334	49.92%	7,440	20.26%	59.92%	10,894	18,334	6,117	–	1,115	–	265	36,725
ON	Timmins-James Bay	NDP	NDP	16,738	50.39%	6,212	18.70%	55.58%	10,526	16,738	5,230	–	724	–	–	33,218
ON	Toronto Centre	Lib	Lib	22,832	41.01%	6,014	10.80%	62.93%	12,604	16,818	22,832	–	2,796	108	512	55,670
ON	Toronto—Danforth	NDP	NDP	29,235	60.80%	20,763	43.18%	65.01%	6,885	29,235	8,472	–	3,107	–	387	48,086
ON	Trinity—Spadina	NDP	NDP	35,601	54.51%	20,325	31.12%	64.95%	10,976	35,601	15,276	–	2,861	–	596	65,310
ON	Vaughan	Lib	Con	38,533	56.32%	18,098	26.45%	55.10%	38,533	7,940	20,435	–	1,515	–	–	68,423
ON	Welland	NDP	NDP	21,917	42.21%	1,022	1.97%	61.43%	20,895	21,917	7,276	–	1,297	169	370	51,924
ON	Wellington—Halton Hills	Con	Con	35,132	63.70%	26,098	47.32%	66.24%	35,132	7,146	9,034	–	3,527	–	316	55,155
ON	Whitby—Oshawa	Con	Con	37,525	58.42%	23,220	36.15%	62.53%	37,525	14,305	9,066	–	3,143	–	198	64,237
ON	Willowdale	Lib	Con	22,207	41.70%	932	1.75%	57.23%	22,207	9,777	21,275	–	–	–	–	53,259
ON	Windsor West	NDP	NDP	21,592	54.33%	9,015	22.68%	48.79%	12,577	21,592	4,327	–	1,096	–	153	39,745
ON	Windsor—Tecumseh	NDP	NDP	22,235	49.92%	7,290	16.37%	53.01%	14,945	22,235	5,764	–	1,354	–	242	44,540
ON	York Centre	Lib	Con	20,356	48.50%	6,377	15.19%	58.98%	20,356	6,656	13,979	–	979	–	–	41,970
ON	York South—Weston	Lib	NDP	14,122	40.12%	2,580	7.33%	51.91%	8,559	14,122	11,542	–	975	–	–	35,198
ON	York West	Lib	Lib	13,030	47.00%	5,309	19.15%	48.19%	6,122	7,721	13,030	–	450	–	401	27,724
ON	York—Simcoe	Con	Con	33,614	63.58%	23,424	44.31%	57.89%	33,614	10,190	5,702	–	2,851	–	509	52,866
PE	Cardigan	Lib	Lib	10,486	49.63%	2,379	11.26%	77.00%	8,107	2,164	10,486	–	373	–	–	21,130
PE	Charlottetown	Lib	Lib	7,292	39.48%	1,252	6.78%	69.44%	6,040	4,632	7,292	–	417	–	87	18,468
PE	Egmont	Con	Con	10,467	54.65%	4,470	23.34%	70.99%	10,467	2,369	5,997	–	320	–	–	19,153
PE	Malpeque	Lib	Lib	8,605	42.40%	671	3.31%	75.73%	7,934	2,970	8,605	–	785	–	–	20,294
QC	Abitibi—Baie-James—Nunavik—Eeyou	BQ	NDP	13,961	44.79%	6,872	22.05%	53.35%	7,089	13,961	3,282	5,615	1,221	–	–	31,168
QC	Abitibi—Témiscamingue	BQ	NDP	24,763	51.22%	9,505	19.66%	59.70%	4,777	24,763	2,859	15,258	694	–	–	48,351
QC	Ahuntsic	BQ	BQ	14,908	31.80%	708	1.51%	64.71%	3,770	14,200	13,087	14,908	620	–	299	46,884
QC	Alfred-Pellan	BQ	NDP	23,098	42.09%	10,594	19.31%	65.72%	6,157	23,098	12,070	12,504	798	245	–	54,872
QC	Argenteuil—Papineau—Mirabel	BQ	NDP	25,802	44.27%	8,922	15.31%	61.06%	6,497	25,802	7,135	16,880	1,506	342	117	58,279
QC	Bas-Richelieu—Nicolet—Bécancour	BQ	BQ	19,046	38.30%	1,341	2.70%	65.71%	6,478	17,705	5,024	19,046	1,479	–	–	49,732
QC	Beauce	Con	Con	26,799	50.71%	10,968	20.75%	63.02%	26,799	15,831	5,833	3,535	852	–	–	52,850
QC	Beauharnois—Salaberry	BQ	NDP	23,998	43.80%	5,816	10.61%	62.12%	7,049	23,998	4,559	18,182	1,003	–	–	54,791
QC	Beauport—Limoilou	Con	NDP	24,306	46.07%	10,461	19.83%	63.17%	13,845	24,306	3,162	10,250	950	–	246	52,759
QC	Berthier—Maskinongé	BQ	NDP	22,403	39.58%	5,735	10.13%	63.57%	7,904	22,403	8,060	16,668	1,196	–	373	56,604
QC	Bourassa	Lib	Lib	15,550	40.91%	3,280	8.63%	55.12%	3,354	12,270	15,550	6,105	613	–	121	38,013
QC	Brome—Missisquoi	BQ	NDP	22,407	42.64%	10,818	20.59%	66.11%	6,256	22,407	11,589	11,173	1,120	–	–	52,545
QC	Brossard—La Prairie	Lib	NDP	25,512	41.02%	8,536	13.72%	64.84%	7,806	25,512	16,976	10,890	900	–	110	62,194
QC	Chambly—Borduas	BQ	NDP	29,591	42.74%	10,444	15.08%	70.42%	5,425	29,591	6,165	19,147	1,072	7,843	–	69,243
QC	Charlesbourg—Haute-Saint-Charles	Con	NDP	24,131	45.01%	7,911	14.76%	66.08%	16,220	24,131	3,505	8,732	832	–	189	53,609
QC	Châteauguay—Saint-Constant	BQ	NDP	29,156	52.04%	14,199	25.34%	65.06%	5,756	29,156	5,069	14,957	923	–	162	56,023
QC	Chicoutimi—Le Fjord	BQ	NDP	19,430	38.13%	4,755	9.33%	63.90%	12,881	19,430	2,852	14,675	780	–	340	50,958
QC	Compton—Stanstead	BQ	NDP	24,097	47.59%	10,918	21.56%	63.64%	5,982	24,097	6,132	13,179	1,241	–	–	50,631
QC	Drummond	BQ	NDP	24,489	51.64%	14,079	29.69%	62.50%	7,555	24,489	3,979	10,410	987	–	–	47,420
QC	Gaspésie—Îles-de-la-Madeleine	BQ	NDP	12,427	33.76%	777	2.11%	53.85%	6,292	12,427	5,533	11,650	913	–	–	36,815
QC	Gatineau	BQ	NDP	35,262	61.83%	26,643	46.72%	64.10%	4,532	35,262	7,975	8,619	639	–	–	57,027
QC	Haute-Gaspésie—La Mitis—Matane—Matapédia	BQ	BQ	12,633	36.05%	3,669	10.47%	59.66%	5,253	7,484	8,964	12,633	707	–	–	35,041
QC	Hochelaga	BQ	NDP	22,314	48.17%	7,863	16.97%	58.43%	3,126	22,314	5,064	14,451	798	–	569	46,322
QC	Honoré-Mercier	Lib	NDP	17,545	36.37%	2,904	6.02%	59.77%	5,992	17,545	14,641	8,935	770	–	351	48,234
QC	Hull—Aylmer	Lib	NDP	35,194	59.20%	23,143	38.93%	65.03%	6,058	35,194	12,051	5,019	1,125	–	–	59,447
QC	Jeanne-Le Ber	BQ	NDP	23,293	44.66%	10,658	20.43%	59.08%	4,678	23,293	10,054	12,635	1,377	–	121	52,158
QC	Joliette	BQ	NDP	27,050	47.33%	8,246	14.43%	63.31%	5,525	27,050	3,545	18,804	2,227	–	–	57,151
QC	Jonquière—Alma	Con	NDP	22,900	43.44%	4,331	8.22%	65.77%	18,569	22,900	1,043	9,554	652	–	–	52,718
QC	La Pointe-de-l'Île	BQ	NDP	23,033	48.34%	7,558	15.86%	60.43%	3,664	23,033	4,369	15,475	898	–	213	47,652
QC	Lac-Saint-Louis	Lib	Lib	18,457	34.11%	2,204	4.07%	65.90%	15,394	16,253	18,457	1,689	2,315	–	–	54,108
QC	LaSalle—Émard	Lib	NDP	17,691	42.15%	6,519	15.53%	56.92%	5,516	17,691	11,172	6,151	946	–	496	41,972
QC	Laurentides—Labelle	BQ	NDP	24,800	43.83%	7,001	12.37%	62.25%	5,246	24,800	7,169	17,799	1,423	–	149	56,586
QC	Laurier—Sainte-Marie	BQ	NDP	23,373	46.64%	5,382	10.74%	63.41%	1,764	23,373	4,976	17,991	1,324	73	612	50,113
QC	Laval	BQ	NDP	22,050	43.33%	10,483	20.60%	60.59%	6,366	22,050	9,422	11,567	1,260	–	224	50,889
QC	Laval—Les Îles	Lib	NDP	25,703	47.64%	14,595	27.05%	58.92%	8,587	25,703	11,108	7,022	966	–	563	53,949
QC	Lévis—Bellechasse	Con	Con	25,850	43.95%	5,960	10.13%	67.10%	25,850	19,890	3,421	8,757	903	–	–	58,821
QC	Longueuil—Pierre-Boucher	BQ	NDP	27,119	51.93%	12,938	24.78%	69.21%	4,339	27,119	5,321	14,181	1,032	–	228	52,220
QC	Lotbinière—Chutes-de-la-Chaudière	Con	Con	22,460	39.88%	777	1.38%	73.83%	22,460	21,683	2,866	8,381	936	–	–	56,326
QC	Louis-Hébert	BQ	NDP	23,373	38.65%	8,733	14.44%	66.20%	13,207	23,373	8,110	14,640	996	–	143	60,469
QC	Louis-Saint-Laurent	Con	NDP	22,629	39.87%	1,295	2.28%	65.88%	21,334	22,629	3,612	8,148	857	–	175	56,755
QC	Manicouagan	BQ	NDP	16,437	48.93%	5,942	17.69%	51.97%	3,878	16,437	1,882	10,495	898	–	–	33,590
QC	Marc-Aurèle-Fortin	BQ	NDP	29,107	49.68%	13,637	23.28%	67.49%	5,768	29,107	7,035	15,470	1,208	–	–	58,588
QC	Mégantic—L'Érable	Con	Con	21,931	49.14%	10,215	22.89%	61.47%	21,931	11,716	2,601	7,481	655	–	250	44,634
QC	Montcalm	BQ	NDP	34,434	52.97%	14,825	22.80%	61.06%	5,118	34,434	3,501	19,609	2,347	–	–	65,009
QC	Montmagny—L'Islet—Kamouraska—Rivière-du-Loup	BQ	NDP	17,285	36.36%	9	0.02%	62.29%	17,276	17,285	2,743	9,550	691	–	–	47,545
QC	Montmorency—Charlevoix—Haute-Côte-Nord	BQ	NDP	17,601	37.35%	1,176	2.50%	57.35%	9,660	17,601	2,628	16,425	814	–	–	47,128
QC	Mount Royal	Lib	Lib	16,151	41.41%	2,260	5.79%	64.59%	13,891	6,963	16,151	1,136	683	74	109	39,007
QC	Notre-Dame-de-Grâce—Lachine	Lib	NDP	17,943	39.73%	3,536	7.83%	58.51%	6,574	17,943	14,407	3,983	1,914	207	131	45,159
QC	Outremont	NDP	NDP	21,906	56.37%	12,702	32.69%	59.70%	3,408	21,906	9,204	3,199	838	–	303	38,858
QC	Papineau	Lib	Lib	16,429	38.41%	4,327	10.12%	61.05%	2,021	12,102	16,429	11,091	806	95	228	42,772
QC	Pierrefonds—Dollard	Lib	NDP	16,390	34.13%	1,758	3.66%	59.15%	12,901	16,390	14,632	2,392	1,710	–	–	48,025
QC	Pontiac	Con	NDP	22,376	45.71%	7,935	16.21%	59.71%	14,441	22,376	6,242	4,917	849	–	124	48,949
QC	Portneuf—Jacques-Cartier	Ind	NDP	22,387	42.67%	7,793	14.85%	65.87%	–	22,387	3,463	10,745	1,279	14,594	–	52,468
QC	Québec	BQ	NDP	22,393	42.64%	7,709	14.68%	66.14%	9,330	22,393	4,735	14,684	1,144	–	228	52,514
QC	Repentigny	BQ	NDP	32,131	51.92%	12,889	20.83%	66.80%	4,606	32,131	4,830	19,242	1,078	–	–	61,887
QC	Richmond—Arthabaska	BQ	BQ	18,033	33.83%	717	1.35%	65.56%	13,145	17,316	3,711	18,033	1,098	–	–	53,303
QC	Rimouski-Neigette—Témiscouata—Les Basques	BQ	NDP	18,360	42.98%	5,190	12.15%	62.90%	6,218	18,360	4,101	13,170	867	–	–	42,716
QC	Rivière-des-Mille-Îles	BQ	NDP	25,639	49.21%	10,766	20.66%	66.60%	5,057	25,639	5,300	14,873	1,229	–	–	52,098
QC	Rivière-du-Nord	BQ	NDP	29,603	55.28%	14,498	27.07%	60.05%	4,469	29,603	3,400	15,105	972	–	–	53,549
QC	Roberval—Lac-Saint-Jean	Con	Con	18,438	45.68%	7,256	17.98%	64.20%	18,438	11,182	1,615	8,577	553	–	–	40,365
QC	Rosemont—La Petite-Patrie	BQ	NDP	27,484	51.00%	9,782	18.15%	66.47%	2,328	27,484	4,920	17,702	899	–	557	53,890
QC	Saint-Bruno—Saint-Hubert	BQ	NDP	24,361	44.64%	8,977	16.45%	67.20%	5,887	24,361	7,423	15,384	1,523	–	–	54,578
QC	Saint-Hyacinthe—Bagot	BQ	NDP	26,963	52.36%	14,312	27.79%	66.04%	8,108	26,963	2,784	12,651	994	–	–	51,500
QC	Saint-Jean	BQ	NDP	24,943	47.48%	8,920	16.98%	62.26%	5,603	24,943	4,644	16,023	1,326	–	–	52,539
QC	Saint-Lambert	BQ	NDP	18,705	42.65%	7,352	16.76%	60.45%	4,396	18,705	8,463	11,353	944	–	–	43,861
QC	Saint-Laurent—Cartierville	Lib	Lib	17,726	43.43%	5,778	14.16%	52.18%	7,124	11,948	17,726	2,981	857	–	176	40,812
QC	Saint-Léonard—Saint-Michel	Lib	Lib	15,340	42.30%	3,620	9.98%	51.31%	4,991	11,720	15,340	3,396	657	–	162	36,266
QC	Saint-Maurice—Champlain	BQ	NDP	18,628	39.07%	4,667	9.79%	60.68%	8,447	18,628	5,670	13,961	972	–	–	47,678
QC	Shefford	BQ	NDP	27,575	51.09%	14,960	27.72%	64.79%	7,908	27,575	4,855	12,615	1,022	–	–	53,975
QC	Sherbrooke	BQ	NDP	22,415	43.10%	3,750	7.21%	63.41%	4,784	22,415	5,020	18,665	894	–	233	52,011
QC	Terrebonne—Blainville	BQ	NDP	28,260	49.34%	10,597	18.50%	65.70%	5,236	28,260	4,893	17,663	1,219	–	–	57,271
QC	Trois-Rivières	BQ	NDP	26,981	53.57%	14,994	29.77%	64.45%	6,205	26,981	3,617	11,987	972	346	256	50,364
QC	Vaudreuil-Soulanges	BQ	NDP	30,177	43.61%	12,396	17.91%	67.07%	11,360	30,177	8,023	17,781	1,864	–	–	69,205
QC	Verchères—Les Patriotes	BQ	NDP	24,514	43.31%	3,921	6.93%	71.42%	4,884	24,514	5,352	20,593	1,259	–	–	56,602
QC	Westmount—Ville-Marie	Lib	Lib	15,346	37.18%	642	1.56%	53.36%	7,218	14,704	15,346	2,278	1,516	–	213	41,275
SK	Battlefords—Lloydminster	Con	Con	19,203	66.90%	11,436	39.84%	56.88%	19,203	7,767	950	–	785	–	–	28,705
SK	Blackstrap	Con	Con	23,280	54.40%	7,511	17.55%	69.26%	23,280	15,769	2,713	–	1,033	–	–	42,795
SK	Cypress Hills—Grasslands	Con	Con	20,555	69.85%	14,307	48.62%	66.25%	20,555	6,248	1,838	–	788	–	–	29,429
SK	Desnethé—Missinippi—Churchill River	Con	Con	10,509	47.93%	794	3.62%	50.35%	10,509	9,715	1,144	–	560	–	–	21,928
SK	Palliser	Con	Con	15,850	47.00%	766	2.27%	67.40%	15,850	15,084	1,797	–	995	–	–	33,726
SK	Prince Albert	Con	Con	19,214	62.17%	9,373	30.33%	60.00%	19,214	9,841	1,070	–	666	–	116	30,907
SK	Regina—Lumsden—Lake Centre	Con	Con	18,076	53.21%	5,558	16.36%	66.29%	18,076	12,518	2,467	–	911	–	–	33,972
SK	Regina—Qu'Appelle	Con	Con	15,896	53.48%	4,477	15.06%	60.38%	15,896	11,419	1,400	–	879	127	–	29,721
SK	Saskatoon—Humboldt	Con	Con	19,954	52.72%	6,683	17.66%	66.52%	19,954	13,271	3,013	–	926	682	–	37,846
SK	Saskatoon—Rosetown—Biggar	Con	Con	14,652	48.70%	538	1.79%	60.50%	14,652	14,114	697	–	626	–	–	30,089
SK	Saskatoon—Wanuskewin	Con	Con	21,183	58.43%	9,788	27.00%	63.12%	21,183	11,395	2,428	–	1,250	–	–	36,256
SK	Souris—Moose Mountain	Con	Con	21,598	73.98%	16,137	55.28%	62.20%	21,598	5,461	1,236	–	898	–	–	29,193
SK	Wascana	Lib	Lib	15,823	40.83%	1,532	3.95%	67.21%	14,291	7,681	15,823	–	954	–	–	38,749
SK	Yorkton—Melville	Con	Con	21,906	68.93%	14,975	47.12%	62.74%	21,906	6,931	2,167	–	774	–	–	31,778
Terr	Nunavut	Con	Con	3,930	49.90%	1,670	21.21%	45.71%	3,930	1,525	2,260	–	160	–	–	7,875
Terr	Western Arctic	NDP	NDP	7,140	45.84%	2,139	13.73%	53.95%	5,001	7,140	2,872	–	477	–	87	15,577
Terr	Yukon	Lib	Con	5,422	33.77%	132	0.82%	66.24%	5,422	2,308	5,290	–	3,037	–	–	16,057

= results as certified in a judicial recount
= open seat
= turnout is above national average
= incumbency arose from byelection gain
= incumbent switched allegiance after 2008 election
= other incumbents defeated

== Party summaries ==
=== Conservatives ===
The Conservatives, who had been leading in the polls since the writs were dropped, won 166 seats - enough for the first Conservative majority government since the Progressive Conservative-Canadian Alliance merger that formed the party in 2003. Notably, the Tories made significant inroads in Toronto, taking eight seats there. While the Tories had won a few seats in the Toronto suburbs since the PC-Canadian Alliance merger, this was the first time a right-of-centre party had won seats in the former Metro Toronto itself since the PC meltdown of 1993. Combined with their traditionally heavy support in the west, this was enough to win a 14-seat majority with 39.62 percent of the national popular vote - a result also notable for being the first time the modern Conservative party successfully polled a larger share of the vote than the combined tally of the PC and CA parties in the election preceding their merger.

Despite winning a majority government, the Conservatives lost over half their seats in Quebec to the NDP, retaining only five seats in that province.

=== New Democrats ===
The NDP had a major windfall, emerging as a truly national party for the first time in its 50-year history. They won 103 seats—more than double their previous high (when they won 43 seats in 1988). Much of this was due to a breakthrough in Quebec, a province where they had been more or less nonexistent for the better part of their history. From only one seat at dissolution, the NDP took 59 of 75 seats there, dominating Montreal and sweeping Quebec City and the Outaouais. By comparison, the NDP had only won one other seat in Quebec in its entire history prior to 2011 (and had held only one other seat, via a floor-crossing). It had not even been fully organized in the province since 1990, when its Quebec wing seceded to preach sovereigntism. The 59 seats won by the NDP in Quebec is the most won by any party in that province since the Progressive Conservatives won 63 seats there in 1988. In several cases, NDP candidates in Quebec won handily even though they didn't even actively campaign.

Among the new NDP MPs were several university students. Five members of the McGill University NDP club—Charmaine Borg, Matthew Dubé, Mylène Freeman, Laurin Liu, and Jamie Nicholls—were elected from Montreal-area ridings. Liu is the youngest woman ever elected to Parliament. Also elected was Pierre-Luc Dusseault, a freshman at the Université de Sherbrooke; his victory in Sherbrooke, Quebec makes him the youngest MP in Canadian history (he only turned 20 two days before he was sworn in).

However, they were unable to make much of an impact in their former western heartland. They actually lost Elmwood—Transcona, the former seat of longtime MP and former deputy leader Bill Blaikie, by only 300 votes.

=== Liberals ===
Winning only 34 seats, the Liberals suffered the worst result in their history. They sat as the third party in the 41st Parliament, the first since Confederation where the Liberals did not form either the Government or the Official Opposition in the House of Commons. This was the worst showing for an incumbent Official Opposition party in terms of seats, and the lowest percentage for a national Official Opposition party (the Bloc Québécois in 1997 won more seats with a smaller vote share on account of its being a regional party).

The Liberals' poor showing was largely due to a collapse of their support in Montreal and Toronto, which had been the backbones of Liberal support for almost two decades. With few exceptions, their support in Toronto flowed to the Tories, while most of their base in Montreal switched to the NDP.

In 2008, they won 20 out of the 23 ridings fully or partially within Toronto. However, in 2011, they only won six, losing 6 to the NDP and 9 to the Conservatives. Additionally, after going into the election holding 30 of the 44 seats in the Greater Toronto Area, they only won seven in 2011.

In Montreal, the Liberals lost five of their 12 seats, and came close to losing several more. Most notably, they came within 2,500 votes of losing Mount Royal, long reckoned as the safest Liberal riding in the nation.

Liberal leader Michael Ignatieff lost his seat of Etobicoke—Lakeshore to first time challenger Bernard Trottier by a margin of 5.27% of the total votes. Other famous MP's who also lost their seats are Ken Dryden (York Centre), Dan McTeague (Pickering—Scarborough East), Gerard Kennedy (Parkdale—High Park), Ujjal Dosanjh (Vancouver South) and Joe Volpe (Eglinton—Lawrence).

All told, the Liberals only won 11 seats in Ontario (all but four in Toronto) and seven in Quebec (all in Montreal)—the fewest the party has ever won in either province. They went into the next Parliament holding only four seats west of Ontario (Winnipeg North, Wascana, Vancouver Centre and Vancouver Quadra).

=== Bloc Québécois ===
The Bloc was practically eliminated from the scene, losing 43 seats. This reduced them to a rump of four seats, only a third of the number required for official party status. In many cases, they lost seats they held since their debut performance in 1993. With few exceptions, their support bled over to the NDP. Notably, the Bloc lost all but one seat in the Montreal area. This included all of their seats in the eastern part of the city, the birthplace of the sovereigntist movement. The Bloc went into the election holding all but one seat in eastern Montreal, but lost all of them to the NDP. They also lost all or most of their seats in their longstanding strongholds in the rest of the province, such as Quebec City and central Quebec. Several Bloc MPs who had never had serious difficulty being reelected ended up losing their seats in landslides. Bloc leader Gilles Duceppe, at the time the longest-tenured party leader in Canada, lost his seat in Laurier—Sainte-Marie to NDP challenger Hélène Laverdière.

=== Greens ===
Despite losing a significant share of the national vote compared to the 2008 election, Green Party leader Elizabeth May became the first Green Party member elected to the Canadian Parliament.

== Vote and seat summaries ==
Popular vote
Conservative	39.62%
NDP	30.63%
Liberal	18.91%
Bloc Québécois	6.04%
Green	3.91%
Others	0.89%

Seat totals
Conservative	54.22%
NDP	33.12%
Liberal	11.04%
Bloc Québécois	1.30%
Green	0.32%

== Gains, holds and losses ==
Elections to the 41st Parliament of Canada – seats won/lost by party, 2008–2011
Party	2008	Gain from (loss to)									2011
Party	2008	Con		NDP		Lib		BQ	Grn	Ind	2011
Conservative	143			2	(6)	27			(1)	1	166
New Democratic	37	6	(2)			17	(1)	45		1	103
Liberal	77		(27)	1	(17)						34
Bloc Québécois	49				(45)						4
Green	–	1									1
Independent	2		(1)		(1)						–
Total	308	7	(30)	3	(69)	44	(1)	45	(1)	2	308

=== Incumbents defeated ===
Liberal Party leader Michael Ignatieff lost his riding of Etobicoke—Lakeshore to Bernard Trottier, a Conservative, and the following day he announced he would resign as Liberal leader. Gilles Duceppe, leader of the Bloc Québécois and incumbent in Laurier—Sainte-Marie was defeated by Hélène Laverdière of the NDP and announced his intention to resign as leader of the Bloc.

Four Cabinet ministers, Lawrence Cannon (Foreign Affairs), Gary Lunn (Sport), Jean-Pierre Blackburn (Veterans Affairs and Agriculture), and Josée Verner (Intergovernmental Affairs and Francophonie) lost their seats. Lunn lost to Green Party leader Elizabeth May, and the NDP won the other three seats.

Defeated incumbents and winners by province

British Columbia
Defeated incumbent	Affiliation	Winner	Affiliation	Electoral district
Sukh Dhaliwal	Liberal	Jinny Sims	NDP	Newton—North Delta
Gary Lunn	Conservative	Elizabeth May	Green	Saanich—Gulf Islands
Dona Cadman	Conservative	Jasbir Sandhu	NDP	Surrey North
Ujjal Dosanjh	Liberal	Wai Young	Conservative	Vancouver South

Manitoba
Defeated incumbent	Affiliation	Winner	Affiliation	Electoral district
Jim Maloway	NDP	Lawrence Toet	Conservative	Elmwood—Transcona
Anita Neville	Liberal	Joyce Bateman	Conservative	Winnipeg South Centre

New Brunswick
Defeated incumbent	Affiliation	Winner	Affiliation	Electoral district
Jean-Claude D'Amours	Liberal	Bernard Valcourt	Conservative	Madawaska—Restigouche
Brian Murphy	Liberal	Robert Goguen	Conservative	Moncton—Riverview—Dieppe

Newfoundland and Labrador
Defeated incumbent	Affiliation	Winner	Affiliation	Electoral district
Todd Russell	Liberal	Peter Penashue	Conservative	Labrador
Siobhán Coady	Liberal	Ryan Cleary	NDP	St. John's South—Mount Pearl

Nova Scotia
Defeated incumbent	Affiliation	Winner	Affiliation	Electoral district
Michael Savage	Liberal	Robert Chisholm	NDP	Dartmouth—Cole Harbour

Ontario
Defeated incumbent	Affiliation	Winner	Affiliation	Electoral district
Mark Holland	Liberal	Chris Alexander	Conservative	Ajax—Pickering
Maria Minna	Liberal	Matthew Kellway	NDP	Beaches—East York
Gurbax Singh Malhi	Liberal	Bal Gosal	Conservative	Bramalea—Gore—Malton
Andrew Kania	Liberal	Kyle Seeback	Conservative	Brampton West
Ruby Dhalla	Liberal	Parm Gill	Conservative	Brampton—Springdale
Mario Silva	Liberal	Andrew Cash	NDP	Davenport
Yasmin Ratansi	Liberal	Joe Daniel	Conservative	Don Valley East
Rob Oliphant	Liberal	John Carmichael	Conservative	Don Valley West
Joe Volpe	Liberal	Joe Oliver	Conservative	Eglinton—Lawrence
Borys Wrzesnewskyj	Liberal	Ted Opitz	Conservative	Etobicoke Centre
Michael Ignatieff	Liberal	Bernard Trottier	Conservative	Etobicoke—Lakeshore
Glen Pearson	Liberal	Susan Truppe	Conservative	London North Centre
Navdeep Bains	Liberal	Eve Adams	Conservative	Mississauga—Brampton South
Paul Szabo	Liberal	Stella Ambler	Conservative	Mississauga South
Bonnie Crombie	Liberal	Brad Butt	Conservative	Mississauga—Streetsville
Anthony Rota	Liberal	Jay Aspin	Conservative	Nipissing—Timiskaming
Gerard Kennedy	Liberal	Peggy Nash	NDP	Parkdale—High Park
Dan McTeague	Liberal	Corneliu Chisu	Conservative	Pickering—Scarborough East
Bryon Wilfert	Liberal	Costas Menegakis	Conservative	Richmond Hill
Tony Martin	NDP	Bryan Hayes	Conservative	Sault Ste. Marie
John Cannis	Liberal	Roxanne James	Conservative	Scarborough Centre
Michelle Simson	Liberal	Dan Harris	NDP	Scarborough Southwest
Helena Guergis	Independent	Kellie Leitch	Conservative	Simcoe—Grey
Martha Hall Findlay	Liberal	Chungsen Leung	Conservative	Willowdale
Ken Dryden	Liberal	Mark Adler	Conservative	York Centre
Alan Tonks	Liberal	Mike Sullivan	NDP	York South—Weston

Quebec
Defeated incumbent	Affiliation	Winner	Affiliation	Electoral district
Yvon Lévesque	Bloc Québécois	Romeo Saganash	NDP	Abitibi—Baie-James—Nunavik—Eeyou
Marc Lemay	Bloc Québécois	Christine Moore	NDP	Abitibi—Témiscamingue
Robert Carrier	Bloc Québécois	Rosane Doré Lefebvre	NDP	Alfred-Pellan
Mario Laframboise	Bloc Québécois	Mylène Freeman	NDP	Argenteuil—Papineau—Mirabel
Claude DeBellefeuille	Bloc Québécois	Anne Minh-Thu Quach	NDP	Beauharnois—Salaberry
Sylvie Boucher	Conservative	Raymond Côté	NDP	Beauport—Limoilou
Guy André	Bloc Québécois	Ruth Ellen Brosseau	NDP	Berthier—Maskinongé
Alexandra Mendès	Liberal	Hoang Mai	NDP	Brossard—La Prairie
Yves Lessard	Bloc Québécois	Matthew Dubé	NDP	Chambly—Borduas
Daniel Petit	Conservative	Anne-Marie Day	NDP	Charlesbourg—Haute-Saint-Charles
Carole Freeman	Bloc Québécois	Sylvain Chicoine	NDP	Châteauguay—Saint-Constant
Robert Bouchard	Bloc Québécois	Dany Morin	NDP	Chicoutimi—Le Fjord
France Bonsant	Bloc Québécois	Jean Rousseau	NDP	Compton—Stanstead
Roger Pomerleau	Bloc Québécois	François Choquette	NDP	Drummond
Richard Nadeau	Bloc Québécois	Françoise Boivin	NDP	Gatineau
Daniel Paillé	Bloc Québécois	Marjolaine Boutin-Sweet	NDP	Hochelaga
Pablo Rodriguez	Liberal	Paulina Ayala	NDP	Honoré-Mercier
Marcel Proulx	Liberal	Nycole Turmel	NDP	Hull—Aylmer
Thierry St-Cyr	Bloc Québécois	Tyrone Benskin	NDP	Jeanne-Le Ber
Pierre Paquette	Bloc Québécois	Francine Raynault	NDP	Joliette
Jean-Pierre Blackburn	Conservative	Claude Patry	NDP	Jonquière—Alma
Lise Zarac	Liberal	Hélène LeBlanc	NDP	LaSalle—Émard
Johanne Deschamps	Bloc Québécois	Marc-André Morin	NDP	Laurentides—Labelle
Gilles Duceppe	Bloc Québécois	Hélène Laverdière	NDP	Laurier—Sainte-Marie
Nicole Demers	Bloc Québécois	José Nunez-Melo	NDP	Laval
Jean Dorion	Bloc Québécois	Pierre Nantel	NDP	Longueuil—Pierre-Boucher
Pascal-Pierre Paillé	Bloc Québécois	Denis Blanchette	NDP	Louis-Hébert
Josée Verner	Conservative	Alexandrine Latendresse	NDP	Louis-Saint-Laurent
Gérard Asselin	Bloc Québécois	Jonathan Genest-Jourdain	NDP	Manicouagan
Roger Gaudet	Bloc Québécois	Manon Perreault	NDP	Montcalm
Bernard Généreux	Conservative	François Lapointe	NDP	Montmagny—L'Islet—Kamouraska—Rivière-du-Loup
Michel Guimond	Bloc Québécois	Jonathan Tremblay	NDP	Montmorency—Charlevoix—Haute-Côte-Nord
Marlene Jennings	Liberal	Isabelle Morin	NDP	Notre-Dame-de-Grâce—Lachine
Bernard Patry	Liberal	Lysane Blanchette-Lamothe	NDP	Pierrefonds—Dollard
Lawrence Cannon	Conservative	Mathieu Ravignat	NDP	Pontiac
André Arthur	Independent	Élaine Michaud	NDP	Portneuf—Jacques-Cartier
Christiane Gagnon	Bloc Québécois	Annick Papillon	NDP	Québec
Nicolas Dufour	Bloc Québécois	Jean-François Larose	NDP	Repentigny
Claude Guimond	Bloc Québécois	Guy Caron	NDP	Rimouski-Neigette—Témiscouata—Les Basques
Luc Desnoyers	Bloc Québécois	Laurin Liu	NDP	Rivière-des-Mille-Îles
Monique Guay	Bloc Québécois	Pierre Dionne Labelle	NDP	Rivière-du-Nord
Bernard Bigras	Bloc Québécois	Alexandre Boulerice	NDP	Rosemont—La Petite-Patrie
Carole Lavallée	Bloc Québécois	Djaouida Sellah	NDP	Saint-Bruno—Saint-Hubert
Ève-Mary Thaï Thi Lac	Bloc Québécois	Marie-Claude Morin	NDP	Saint-Hyacinthe—Bagot
Claude Bachand	Bloc Québécois	Tarik Brahmi	NDP	Saint-Jean
Josée Beaudin	Bloc Québécois	Sadia Groguhé	NDP	Saint-Lambert
Jean-Yves Laforest	Bloc Québécois	Lise St-Denis	NDP	Saint-Maurice—Champlain
Robert Vincent	Bloc Québécois	Réjean Genest	NDP	Shefford
Serge Cardin	Bloc Québécois	Pierre-Luc Dusseault	NDP	Sherbrooke
Diane Bourgeois	Bloc Québécois	Charmaine Borg	NDP	Terrebonne—Blainville
Paule Brunelle	Bloc Québécois	Robert Aubin	NDP	Trois-Rivières
Meili Faille	Bloc Québécois	Jamie Nicholls	NDP	Vaudreuil-Soulanges
Luc Malo	Bloc Québécois	Sana Hassainia	NDP	Verchères—Les Patriotes

Yukon
Defeated incumbent	Affiliation	Winner	Affiliation	Electoral district
Larry Bagnell	Liberal	Ryan Leef	Conservative	Yukon

=== Open seats ===
The Bloc gained Haute-Gaspésie—La Mitis—Matane—Matapédia by the largest margin of victory of their four seats won and vacated by a long-standing member of the Bloc Québécois.

The Conservatives gained Calgary Centre-North and Prince George—Peace River, both vacated by long-standing Conservatives.

Seats that changed hands through vacancies at dissolution or retirements

Alberta
Outgoing incumbent	Affiliation	Winner	Affiliation	Electoral district
Vacant		Michelle Rempel	Conservative	Calgary Centre-North
Rick Casson	Conservative	Jim Hillyer	Conservative	Lethbridge

British Columbia
Outgoing incumbent	Affiliation	Winner	Affiliation	Electoral district
Bill Siksay	NDP	Kennedy Stewart	NDP	Burnaby—Douglas
Chuck Strahl	Conservative	Mark Strahl	Conservative	Chilliwack—Fraser Canyon
John Cummins	Conservative	Kerry-Lynne Findlay	Conservative	Delta—Richmond East
Keith Martin	Liberal	Randall Garrison	NDP	Esquimalt—Juan de Fuca
Jim Abbott	Conservative	Dan Albas	Conservative	Kootenay—Columbia
Stockwell Day	Conservative	David Wilks	Conservative	Okanagan—Coquihalla
Vacant		Bob Zimmer	Conservative	Prince George—Peace River

New Brunswick
Outgoing incumbent	Affiliation	Winner	Affiliation	Electoral district
Greg Thompson	Conservative	John Williamson	Conservative	New Brunswick Southwest

Ontario
Outgoing incumbent	Affiliation	Winner	Affiliation	Electoral district
Peter Milliken	Liberal	Ted Hsu	Liberal	Kingston and the Islands
Albina Guarnieri	Liberal	Wladyslaw Lizon	Conservative	Mississauga East—Cooksville
Derek Lee	Liberal	Rathika Sitsabaiesan	NDP	Scarborough—Rouge River

Prince Edward Island
Outgoing incumbent	Affiliation	Winner	Affiliation	Electoral district
Shawn Murphy	Liberal	Sean Casey	Liberal	Charlottetown

Quebec
Outgoing incumbent	Affiliation	Winner	Affiliation	Electoral district
Christian Ouellet	Bloc Québécois	Pierre Jacob	NDP	Brome—Missisquoi
Raynald Blais	Bloc Québécois	Philip Toone	NDP	Gaspésie—Îles-de-la-Madeleine
Vacant		Jean-François Fortin	Bloc Québécois	Haute-Gaspésie—La Mitis—Matane—Matapédia
Francine Lalonde	Bloc Québécois	Ève Péclet	NDP	La Pointe-de-l'Île
Raymonde Folco	Liberal	François Pilon	NDP	Laval—Les Îles
Serge Ménard	Bloc Québécois	Alain Giguère	NDP	Marc-Aurèle-Fortin

== Results by province ==
Party name		BC	AB	SK	MB	ON	QC	NB	NS	PE	NL	YT	NT	NU	Total
Conservative	Seats:	21	27	13	11	73	5	8	4	1	1	1	0	1	166
Conservative	Vote:	45.5	66.8	56.3	53.5	44.4	16.5	43.9	36.7	41.2	28.4	33.8	32.1	49.9	39.6
New Democrats	Seats:	12	1	0	2	22	59	1	3	0	2	0	1	0	103
New Democrats	Vote:	32.5	16.8	32.3	25.8	25.6	42.9	29.8	30.3	15.4	32.6	14.4	45.8	19.4	30.6
Liberal	Seats:	2	0	1	1	11	7	1	4	3	4	0	0	0	34
Liberal	Vote:	13.4	9.3	8.6	16.6	25.3	14.2	22.6	28.9	41.0	37.9	33.0	18.4	28.7	18.9
Bloc Québécois	Seats:						4								4
Bloc Québécois	Vote:						23.4								6.0
Green	Seats:	1	0	0	0	0	0	0	0	0	0	0	0	0	1
Green	Vote:	7.7	5.3	2.7	3.6	3.8	2.1	3.2	4.0	2.4	0.9	18.9	3.1	2.0	3.9
Independent and no affiliation	Vote:	0.2	1.3	0.2	0.1	0.2	0.6	0.5			0.3				0.4
Total seats		36	28	14	14	106	75	10	11	4	7	1	1	1	308

=== British Columbia ===
Results in British Columbia
Party	Seats	Second	Third	Fourth	Fifth	Sixth	Votes	%	+/-
Conservative	21	13	2						-1
New Democrats	12	19	5						+3
Liberal	2	4	23	7					-3
Green	1		6	29					+1
Christian Heritage					3	3			
Independent and no Affiliation					9	2			
Libertarian					6	2			
Marxist–Leninist					5	3			
Communist						3			
Canadian Action						2			
Progressive Canadian					1	1			
Western Block					1				
Pirate					3				
Rhinoceros									
Total	36							100.0	

=== Prairie provinces ===
==== Alberta ====
Results in Alberta
Party	Seats	Second	Third	Fourth	Fifth	Sixth	Votes	%	+/-
Conservative	27	1					932,765	66.8	+2.2
New Democrats	1	23	4				234,730	16.8	+4.1
Liberal	0	3	15	10			129,310	9.3	-2.1
Green	0	0	9	18	1		73,058	5.2	-3.6
Independent	0	1			5		17,906	1.3	-0.7
Christian Heritage	0	0			5	2	3,401	0.2	-0.1
Canadian Action	0	0				1	384	0.0	-0.1
Marxist–Leninist	0	0			3	2	808	0.1	0
Communist	0	0			1	1	346	0.0	0
Pirate	0	0			2		663	0.0	0
Western Block	0	0				2	415	0.0	0
Rhinoceros	0	0				1	345	0.0	0
Progressive Canadian	0	0			1		1,754	0.1	+0.1
Total	28						1,395,885	100.0	

==== Saskatchewan ====
Results in Saskatchewan
Party	Seats	Second	Third	Fourth	Fifth	Votes	%	+/-
Conservative	13	1	0	0	0			-
Liberal	1	0	13	0	0			-
New Democrats	0	13	1	0	0			
Green	0	0	0	14	0			
Canadian Action	0	0	0	0	1			
Independent	0	0	0	0	2			
Total	14						100.0	

==== Manitoba ====
Results in Manitoba
Party	Seats	Second	Third	Fourth	Fifth	Sixth	Votes	%	+/-
Conservative	11	2	1	0	0	0			+2
New Democrats	2	9	3	0	0	0			-2
Liberal	1	3	9	1	0	0			-
Green	0	0	1	13	0	0			
Christian Heritage	0	0	0	0	2	0			
Independent	0	0	0	0	2	2			
Communist	0	0	0	0	2	0			
Pirate	0	0	0	0	0	1			
Total	14							100.0	

=== Ontario ===
Results in Ontario
Party	Seats	Second	Third	Fourth	Fifth	Sixth	Votes	%	+/-
Conservative	73	24	9	0	0	0			+22
New Democrats	22	34	50	0	0	0			+5
Liberal	11	46	46	3	0	0			-27
Green	0	1	0	100	2	0			
Independent and no Affiliation	0	1	1						
Christian Heritage	0	0	0	0	21	2			
Progressive Canadian	0	0	0	0	6	2			
Marxist–Leninist	0	0	0	0	17	6			
Libertarian	0	0	0	1	11	2			
Communist	0	0	0	0	3	3			
Marijuana				1					
Canadian Action									
First Peoples National	0	0	0	0	1	0			
Animal Alliance	0	0	0	0	3	2			
Pirate	0	0	0	0	1	1			
United	0	0	0	0	2	1			
Total	106							100.0	

=== Quebec ===
Results in Quebec
Party	Seats	Second	Third	Fourth	Fifth	Sixth	Votes	%	+/-
New Democrats	59	14	2	0	0	0			+58
Liberal	7	10	23	35	0	0			-7
Conservative	5	8	32	28	1	0			-5
Bloc Québécois	4	42	17	11	1	0			-45
Green	0	0	0	1	73	1			
Independent and no affiliation	0	1	1	0	0	4			
Marxist–Leninist	0	0	0	0	0	14			
Rhinoceros	0	0	0	0	0	10			
Christian Heritage	0	0	0	0	0	5			
Communist	0	0	0	0	0	0			
Pirate	0	0	0	0	0	1	369		
Canadian Action	0	0	0	0	0	1	250		
Total	75							100.0	

=== Atlantic provinces ===
==== New Brunswick ====
Results in New Brunswick
Party	Seats	Second	Third	Fourth	Fifth	Votes	%	+/-
Conservative	8	2	0	0	0			+2
Liberal	1	2	7	0	0			-2
New Democrats	1	6	3	0	0			-
Green	0	0	0	8	1			
Marxist–Leninist								
Christian Heritage	0	0	0	0	1			
Total	10						100.0	

==== Nova Scotia ====
Results in Nova Scotia
Party	Seats	Second	Third	Fourth	Fifth	Votes	%	+/-
Conservative	4	5	2	0	0			+1
Liberal	4	3	4	0	0			-1
New Democrats	3	3	5	0	0			+1
Green	0	0	0	11	0			
Christian Heritage	0	0	0	0	1			
Marxist–Leninist	0	0	0	0	1			
Total	11						100.0	

==== Prince Edward Island ====
Results in Prince Edward Island
Party	Seats	Second	Third	Fourth	Votes	%	+/-
Liberal	3	1	0	0			-
Conservative	1	3	0	0			-
New Democrats	0	0	4	0			-
Green	0	0	0	4			
Christian Heritage	0	0	0	0			
Total	4					100.0	

==== Newfoundland and Labrador ====
Results in Newfoundland and Labrador (Preliminary)
Party	Seats	Second	Third	Fourth	Votes	%	+/-
Liberal	4	2	1	0			-2
New Democrats	2	0	5	0			+1
Conservative	1	5	1	0			+1
Green	0	0	0	5			
Independent	0	0	0	2			
Total	7					100.0	

== Results by territory ==
Results in the Yukon
Party	Seats	Second	Third	Votes	%	+/-
Conservative	1			5,422	33.8	+1.1
Liberal		1		5,290	32.9	-12.9
Green			1	3,037	18.9	+6.1
New Democrats				2,308	14.4	+5.7
Total	1			16,057	100.0	

Results in the Northwest Territories
Party	Seats	Second	Third	Fourth	Votes	%	+/-
New Democrats	1				7,140	45.8	+4.3
Conservative		1			5,001	32.1	-5.5
Liberal			1		2,872	18.4	+4.8
Green				1	477	3.1	-2.4
Animal Alliance					87	0.6	+0.6
Total	1				15,577	100.0	

Results in Nunavut
Party	Seats	Second	Third	Votes	%	+/-
Conservative	1			3,930	49.9	+15.0
Liberal		1		2,260	28.7	-0.4
New Democrats			1	1,525	19.4	-8.2
Green				160	2.0	-6.3
Total	1			7,875	100.0	

== See also ==
- Results of the 2011 Canadian federal election by riding
