= New Democratic Party candidates in the 2015 Canadian federal election =

This is a list of New Democratic Party candidates in the 2015 Canadian federal election. The NDP nominated candidates in all of Canada's 338 ridings; 44 of whom were elected. Following the election, the NDP was the third largest party in the House of Commons.

== Candidate statistics ==
Candidates Nominated	Male Candidates	Female Candidates	Most Common Occupation
329	189	140	Education – 36

== Newfoundland and Labrador – 7 seats ==
Riding	Candidate's Name	Notes	Gender	Residence	Occupation	Votes	%	Rank
Avalon	Jeannie Baldwin	Regional Executive Vice-President, Atlantic, Public Service Alliance of Canada and PSAC Representative on the New Democratic Party Federal Council	F		Human Resources	6,075	14.43	3rd
Bonavista—Burin—Trinity	Jenn Brown		F		Artist	2,557	7.29	3rd
Coast of Bays—Central—Notre Dame	Claudette Menchenton		F	Gander	Retail / Fitness Instructor	2,175	6.14	3rd
Labrador	Edward Rudkowski	Candidate for Nunatsiavut Assembly in 2014	M		Finance	1,779	14.38	2nd
Long Range Mountains	Devon Babstock		M	Rocky Harbour	School Administrator	4,739	11.33	3rd
St. John's East	Jack Harris	Member of Parliament for St. John's East (2008–2015 & 1987–1988); Leader of the Newfoundland and Labrador New Democratic Party (1992–2006); Member of the Newfoundland and Labrador House of Assembly for Signal Hill-Quidi Vidi (1996–2006); Member of the Newfoundland and Labrador House of Assembly for St. John's East (1990–1996)	M	St. John's	Journalist, Lawyer	20,328	45.29	2nd
St. John's South—Mount Pearl	Ryan Cleary	Member of Parliament for St. John's South—Mount Pearl (2011–2015)	M	St. John's	Journalist	16,467	36.76	2nd

== Prince Edward Island – 4 seats ==
Riding	Candidate's Name	Notes	Gender	Residence	Occupation	Votes	%	Rank
Cardigan	Billy Cann	Leader of the Island Party (2011–2012)	M	Montague	Fisherman	2,503	11.13	3rd
Charlottetown	Joe Byrne	NDP candidate for Charlottetown in the 2011 federal election	M	Charlottetown	Settlement officer	4,897	23.14	2nd
Egmont	Herb Dickieson	Leader of the New Democratic Party of Prince Edward Island (1995–2002); Member of the Legislative Assembly of PEI for West Point-Bloomfield (1996–2000)	M	O'Leary	Physician	4,097	19.18	3rd
Malpeque	Leah-Jane Hayward		F	North Wiltshire	Entrepreneur	2,509	11.17	3rd

== Nova Scotia – 11 seats ==
Riding	Candidate's Name	Notes	Gender	Residence	Occupation	Votes	%	Rank
Cape Breton—Canso	Michelle Smith		F			3,547	8.20	3rd
Central Nova	Ross Landry	Minister of Justice and Attorney General of Nova Scotia (2009–2013); Member of the Nova Scotia House of Assembly for Pictou Centre (2009–2013)	M		Police officer	4,532	10.24	3rd
Cumberland—Colchester	Wendy Robinson	Mayor of Stewiacke	F		Mayor	2,647	5.71	3rd
Dartmouth—Cole Harbour	Robert Chisholm	Member of Parliament for Dartmouth—Cole Harbour (2011–2015); Leader of the Nova Scotia New Democratic Party (1996–2000); Member of the Nova Scotia House of Assembly for Halifax Atlantic (1991–2003)	M	Porter's Lake	Consultant	12,757	24.41	2nd
Halifax	Megan Leslie	Deputy Leader of the New Democratic Party (2012–2015); Member of Parliament for Halifax (2008–2015)	F	Halifax	Lawyer	19,162	36.13	2nd
Halifax West	Joanne Hussey		F	Halifax	Businesswoman	5,894	11.77	3rd
Kings—Hants	Hugh Curry		M	White Rock	Wine-industry worker	2,998	6.42	3rd
Sackville—Preston—Chezzetcook	Peter Stoffer	Member of Parliament for Sackville—Eastern Shore (2004–2015); Member of Parliament for Sackville—Musquodoboit Valley—Eastern Shore (1997–2004)	M	Windsor Junction	Manager	16,613	34.39	2nd
South Shore—St. Margaret's	Alex Godbold		M	New Germany	Teacher	8,883	16.83	3rd
Sydney—Victoria	Monika Dutt	Board Member, Canadian Doctors for Medicare	F		Doctor	5,351	13.06	2nd
West Nova	Greg Foster	Former municipal councillor, Argyle	M		Educator	3,084	6.75	3rd

== New Brunswick – 10 seats ==
Riding	Candidate's Name	Notes	Gender	Residence	Occupation	Votes	%	Rank
Acadie—Bathurst	Jason Godin	Mayor of Maisonnette (2012–2016)	M	Maisonnette	University student	20,079	39.40	2nd
Beauséjour	Hélène Boudreau	NBNDP candidate for Memramcook-Tantramar in the 2014 New Brunswick provincial election Member of Dieppe City Council (2008–2012)	F		Nurse	8,009	15.13	2nd
Fredericton	Sharon Scott-Levesque	NBNDP candidate for Fredericton-York in the 2014 New Brunswick provincial election	F		Nurse	4,622	9.89	4th
Fundy Royal	Jennifer McKenzie	ONDP candidate for Ottawa Centre in the 2014 Ontario provincial election Ottawa-Carleton District School Board Trustee for Zone 10 (2006–2014)	F	St. Martins	Electrical engineer	8,204	17.52	3rd
Madawaska—Restigouche	Rosaire L'Italien	Former news reporter for CBAFT-DT in Moncton	M	Edmundston	Journalist	9,670	25.92	2nd
Miramichi—Grand Lake	Patrick Colford	President of the New Brunswick Federation of Labour (2013–2019)	M		Union leader	5,588	15.37	3rd
Moncton—Riverview—Dieppe	Luc LeBlanc	NBNDP candidate for Moncton Centre in the 2014 New Brunswick provincial election	M	Moncton	Historian	8,420	16.18	3rd
New Brunswick Southwest	Andrew Graham	NDP candidate for New Brunswick Southwest in the 2011, 2008, and 2006 federal elections	M	Saint John	Carpenter	4,768	12.57	3rd
Saint John—Rothesay	AJ Griffin	NBNDP candidate for Quispamsis in the 2014 New Brunswick provincial election	F	Quispamsis	IT Professional & Zumba Instructor	7,411	17.53	3rd
Tobique—Mactaquac	Robert Kitchen		M			4,334	11.28	3rd

== Quebec – 78 seats ==
Riding	Candidate's Name	Notes	Gender	Residence	Occupation	Votes	%	Rank
Abitibi—Baie-James—Nunavik—Eeyou	Romeo Saganash	Member of Parliament for Abitibi—Baie-James—Nunavik—Eeyou (2011–2019); Deputy Grand Chief of the Grand Council of the Crees (1990–1993)	M	Senneterre	Lawyer	12,778	37.02	1st
Abitibi—Témiscamingue	Christine Moore	Member of Parliament for Abitibi—Témiscamingue (2011–2019)	F	La Reine	Nurse	20,636	41.50	1st
Ahuntsic-Cartierville	Maria Mourani	Member of Parliament for Ahuntsic (2006–2015)	F	Montreal	Criminologist	16,684	30.03	2nd
Alfred-Pellan	Rosane Doré Lefebvre	Member of Parliament for Alfred-Pellan (2011–2015)	F	Laval	Sales agent	13,225	23.97	2nd
Argenteuil—La Petite-Nation	Chantal Crête	Member of Lac-Simon Town Council (2013–present)	F	Lac-Simon	Doctor, pedagogue	12,650	24.77	2nd
Avignon—La Mitis—Matane—Matapédia	Joël Charest		M	Price	Political assistant	7,340	20.19	3rd
Beauce	Daniel Royer		M			5,443	9.74	3rd
Beauport—Côte-de-Beaupré—Île d’Orléans—Charlevoix	Jonathan Tremblay	Member of Parliament for Beauport—Côte-de-Beaupré—Île d’Orléans—Charlevoix (2011–2015)	M	Beaupre	Bricklayer	9,306	18.44	4th
Beauport—Limoilou	Raymond Côté	Member of Parliament for Beauport—Limoilou (2011–2015)	M	Québec	Civil servant	12,881	25.48	2nd
Bécancour—Nicolet—Saurel	Nicolas Tabah		M	Sorel-Tracy	Political assistant	11,531	22.09	3rd
Bellechasse—Les Etchemins—Lévis	Jean-Luc Daigle	Member of Lévis City Council for District 9 (2005–2013); Mayor of Saint-Romuald (1995–2002)	M	Lévis	Construction	8,516	13.60	3rd
Beloeil—Chambly	Matthew Dubé	Member of Parliament for Chambly—Borduas (2011–2015)	M	Saint-Basile-le-Grand	University student	20,641	31.07	1st
Berthier—Maskinongé	Ruth Ellen Brosseau	Member of Parliament for Berthier—Maskinongé (2011–2019)	F	Trois-Rivières Ouest	Assistant manager	22,942	42.17	1st
Bourassa	Dolmine Laguerre		F	Repentigny	Civil servant	6,144	14.94	3rd
Brome—Missisquoi	Catherine Lusson		F	Bromont	Political assistant	14,383	24.51	2nd
Brossard—Saint-Lambert	Hoang Mai	Member of Parliament for Brossard—La Prairie (2011–2015)	M	Montreal	Notary	14,075	24.58	2nd
Charlesbourg—Haute-Saint-Charles	Anne-Marie Day	Member of Parliament for Charlesbourg—Haute-Saint-Charles (2011–2015)	F	Québec	Employment agency director	11,690	20.07	3rd
Châteauguay—Lacolle	Sylvain Chicoine	Member of Parliament for Châteauguay—Saint-Constant (2011–2015)	M	Delson	Constable	11,986	23.15	3rd
Chicoutimi—Le Fjord	Dany Morin	Member of Parliament for Chicoutimi—Le Fjord (2011–2015)	M	Laterrière	Chiropractor	13,019	29.72	2nd
Compton—Stanstead	Jean Rousseau	Member of Parliament for Compton—Stanstead (2011–2015)	M	Georgeville	Human resources counsellor	15,300	27.41	2nd
Dorval—Lachine—LaSalle	Isabelle Morin	Member of Parliament for Notre-Dame-de-Grâce—Lachine (2011–2015)	F	Lachine	Teacher	11,769	21.55	2nd
Drummond	François Choquette	Member of Parliament for Drummond (2011–2019)	M	Drummondville	Teacher	15,833	30.46	1st
Gaspésie—Les Îles-de-la-Madeleine	Philip Toone	Member of Parliament for Gaspésie—Les Îles-de-la-Madeleine (2011–2015)	M	Carleton-sur-Mer	Notary	12,885	32.52	2nd
Gatineau	Françoise Boivin	Member of Parliament for Gatineau (2011–2015 & 2004–2006)	F	Gatineau	Lawyer	15,352	26.56	2nd
Hochelaga	Marjolaine Boutin-Sweet	Member of Parliament for Hochelaga (2011–2019)	F	Montreal	Interpreter and museum guide	16,034	30.89	1st
Honoré-Mercier	Paulina Ayala	Member of Parliament for Honoré-Mercier (2011–2015)	F	Montreal	Teacher	8,478	16.41	2nd
Hull—Aylmer	Nycole Turmel	Member of Parliament for Hull—Aylmer (2011–2015); Interim Leader of the New Democratic Party (2011–2012); President of the Public Service Alliance of Canada (2000–2006)	F	Gatineau	Union leader	17,472	31.52	2nd
Joliette	Danielle Landreville	Member of Joliette City Council for Ward 4 (2013–2021)	F	Joliette	Consultant	14,566	25.69	3rd
Jonquière	Karine Trudel	President of the Canadian Union of Postal Workers for Saguenay Lac St-Jean (2007–2015)	F	Chicoutimi	Trade Union Organizer	14,039	29.19	1st
La Pointe-de-l'Île	Ève Péclet	Member of Parliament for La Pointe-de-l'Île (2011–2015)	F	Montreal	Community activist	14,777	26.76	3rd
La Prairie	Pierre Chicoine	Brother of NDP MP Sylvain Chicoine	M	Sainte-Catherine	IT technician	13,174	22.88	3rd
Lac-Saint-Jean	Gisèle Dallaire		F	Saguenay	Psychologist	15,735	28.46	2nd
Lac-Saint-Louis	Ryan Young	Green Party candidate for Pierrefonds—Dollard in the 2008 federal election	M	Sainte-Anne-de-Bellevue	Teacher	7,997	12.83	3rd
LaSalle—Émard—Verdun	Hélène LeBlanc	Member of Parliament for LaSalle—Émard (2011–2015)	F	Montreal	Agronomist	15,566	28.95	2nd
Laurentides—Labelle	Simon-Pierre Landry		M	Sainte-Agathe-des-Monts	Physician	16,644	26.35	3rd
Laurier—Sainte-Marie	Hélène Laverdière	Member of Parliament for Laurier—Sainte-Marie (2011–2019)	F	Montreal	Translator	20,929	38.27	1st
Laval—Les Îles	François Pilon	Member of Parliament for Laval—Les Îles (2011–2015)	M	Montreal	Civil servant	10,710	19.76	2nd
Lévis—Lotbinière	Hélène Bilodeau		F			9,246	14.77	3rd
Longueuil—Charles-LeMoyne	Sadia Groguhé	Member of Parliament for Saint-Lambert (2011–2015); Member of Istres City Council (1995–2000)	F	Greenfield Park	Therapist	12,468	24.11	3rd
Longueuil—Saint-Hubert	Pierre Nantel	Member of Parliament for Longueuil—Pierre-Boucher (2011–2015)	M	Longueuil	Researcher	18,171	31.22	1st
Louis-Hébert	Denis Blanchette	Member of Parliament for Louis-Hébert (2011–2015)	M	Québec	Computer analyst	12,850	20.81	3rd
Louis-Saint-Laurent	Daniel Caron	Canadian ambassador to Ukraine (2008–2011)	M	Quebec City	Diplomat	10,296	15.92	3rd
Manicouagan	Jonathan Genest-Jourdain	Member of Parliament for Manicouagan (2011–2015)	M	Sept-Îles	Lawyer	7,359	17.51	3rd
Marc-Aurèle-Fortin	Marie-Josée Lemieux		F	Outremont	Psychologist	12,827	23.52	2nd
Mégantic—L'Érable	Jean-François Deslisle		M			10,386	21.96	3rd
Mirabel	Mylène Freeman	Member of Parliament for Argenteuil—Papineau—Mirabel (2011–2015)	F	Verdun	Research assistant	17,873	30.08	2nd
Montarville	Djaouida Sellah	Member of Parliament for Saint-Bruno—Saint-Hubert (2011–2015)	F	Longueuil	Physician	14,296	24.68	3rd
Montcalm	Martin Leclerc		M			12,431	23.45	3rd
Montmagny—L'Islet—Kamouraska—Rivière-du-Loup	François Lapointe	Member of Parliament for Montmagny—L'Islet—Kamouraska—Rivière-du-Loup (2011–2015)	M	Saint-Jean-Port-Joli	Composer, environmentalist, project coordinator	11,918	24.20	3rd
Mount Royal	Mario Rimbao		M	Brossard	Shipping/receiving	3,884	8.08	3rd
Notre-Dame-de-Grâce—Westmount	Jim Hughes		M			11,229	21.76	2nd
Outremont	Thomas Mulcair	Leader of the New Democratic Party (2012–2017); Member of Parliament for Outremont (2007–2018); Quebec Minister of the Environment (2003–2006); Member of the National Assembly of Quebec for Chomedey (1994–2007)	M	Beaconsfield	Lawyer	19,242	44.11	1st
Papineau	Anne Lagacé Dowson	NDP candidate for Westmount–Ville-Marie in the 2008 federal election	F	Montreal	Journalist	13,132	25.87	2nd
Pierre-Boucher—Les Patriotes—Verchères	Raphaël Fortin		M	Boucherville	Photographer, bartender	14,454	24.34	2nd
Pierrefonds—Dollard	Lysane Blanchette-Lamothe	Member of Parliament for Pierrefonds—Dollard (2011–2015)	F	Dollard-des-Ormeaux	Community development worker	9,584	16.38	3rd
Pontiac	Mathieu Ravignat	Member of Parliament for Pontiac (2011–2015)	M	Cantley	Instructor	14,090	22.50	2nd
Portneuf—Jacques-Cartier	Élaine Michaud	Member of Parliament for Portneuf—Jacques-Cartier (2011–2015)	F	Neuville	Information officer	13,686	22.05	2nd
Québec	Annick Papillon	Member of Parliament for Québec (2011–2015)	F	Québec	Civil servant	14,566	27.04	2nd
Repentigny	Réjean Bellemare	NDP candidate for Repentigny in the 2008, and 2006 federal elections	M	Repentigny	Economist	15,167	23.26	3rd
Richmond—Arthabaska	Myriam Beaulieu		F	Melbourne	Agriculture specialist	14,213	24.25	3rd
Rimouski-Neigette—Témiscouata—Les Basques	Guy Caron	Incumbent Member of Parliament	M	Rimouski	Economist			
Rivière-des-Mille-Îles	Lauren Liu	Incumbent Member of Parliament	F	Saint-Eustache	Student			
Rivière-du-Nord	Pierre Dionne Labelle	Incumbent Member of Parliament	M	Saint-Jérôme	Development agent			
Rosemont—La Petite-Patrie	Alexandre Boulerice	Incumbent Member of Parliament	M	Montreal	Communications advisor			
Saint-Hyacinthe—Bagot	Brigitte Sansoucy	2008 and 2007 by-election candidate in this riding	F	Saint-Hyacinthe	Administrative assistant			
Saint-Jean	Hans Marotte	2000 candidate in Papineau—Saint-Denis, legal advisor for the Mouvement Action-Chômage de Montréal	M	Saint-Mathias-sur-Richelieu	Lawyer, columnist			
Saint-Laurent	Alain Ackad		M					
Saint-Léonard—Saint-Michel	Rosannie Filato		F	Saint-Léonard	Lawyer			
Saint-Maurice—Champlain	Jean-Yves Tremblay	Shawinigan City Councillor for Des Hêtres District	M					
Salaberry—Suroît	Anne Minh-Thu Quach	Incumbent Member of Parliament	F	Salaberry-de-Valleyfield	Teacher			
Shefford	Claire Mailhot		F					
Sherbrooke	Pierre-Luc Dusseault	Incumbent Member of Parliament, youngest MP ever elected to the House of Commons	M	Sherbrooke	Student			
Terrebonne	Charmaine Borg	Incumbent Member of Parliament	F	Verdun	Labour relations officer			
Thérèse-De Blainville	Alain Giguère	Incumbent Member of Parliament for Marc-Aurèle-Fortin	M	Sainte-Thérèse	Lawyer			
Trois-Rivières	Robert Aubin	Incumbent Member of Parliament, Chair of the NDP Quebec Caucus	M	Trois-Rivières	Teacher			
Vaudreuil—Soulanges	Jamie Nicholls	Incumbent Member of Parliament	M	Saint-Lazare	Architect			
Ville-Marie—Le Sud-Ouest—Île-des-Soeurs	Allison Turner		F	Montreal	Lawyer			
Vimy	France Duhamel		F	Laval	Lawyer			

== Ontario – 121 seats ==
Riding	Candidate's Name	Notes	Gender	Residence	Occupation	Votes	%	Rank
Ajax	Stephanie Brown		F	Ajax	Student			
Algoma—Manitoulin—Kapuskasing	Carol Hughes	Incumbent Member of Parliament	F	Hanmer	Union representative			
Aurora—Oak Ridges—Richmond Hill	Brenda Power		F					
Barrie—Innisfil	Myrna Clark	2011 Ontario NDP candidate in Barrie, 2011 and 2008 candidate in Barrie	F	Barrie	Teacher			
Barrie—Springwater—Oro-Medonte	Ellen White		F	Barrie	Motivational speaker, sales			
Bay of Quinte	Terry Cassidy	20-year Quinte West city councillor	M	Quinte West	Executive director of not-for-profit organization			
Beaches—East York	Matthew Kellway	Incumbent Member of Parliament	M	Toronto	Economist			
Brampton Centre	Rosemary Keenan	Chairwoman of the Peel Sierra Club	F	Brampton	Environmentalist			
Brampton East	Harbaljit Kahlon		M	Brampton	Business strategist			
Brampton North	Martin Singh	2012 New Democratic Party Leadership candidate, Former Sackville—Eastern Shore NDP riding association president	M	Brampton	Pharmacist			
Brampton South	Amarjit Sangha		M					
Brampton West	Adaoma Patterson		F	Brampton	Event manager			
Brantford—Brant	Marc Laferriere	2011 candidate in Brant	M	Paris	Social worker			
Bruce—Grey—Owen Sound	David McLaren		M	Neyaashiinigmiing	Writer			
Burlington	David Carter Laird	2011, 2008, 2006, 2004 candidate in this riding, 2003 Ontario NDP candidate in this riding	M	Burlington	Social worker			
Cambridge	Bobbi Stewart	2011 candidate in Guelph	F	Cambridge	Social worker			
Carleton	KC Laroque		F					
Chatham-Kent—Leamington	Tony Walsh	President of the Chatham-Kent United Way	M	Chatham	Management consultant			
Davenport	Andrew Cash	Incumbent Member of Parliament	M	Toronto	Musician			
Don Valley East	Khalid Ahmed		M					
Don Valley North	Akil Sadikali	2011 Green Party candidate in Don Valley East	M	Toronto	Software engineer			
Don Valley West	Syeda Riaz		F					
Dufferin—Caledon	Rehya Yazbek	2014 Ontario NDP candidate for this riding	F	Caledon	Union representative			
Durham	Derek Spence	2014 Ontario NDP candidate for this riding	M	Newtonville	Lobbyist			
Eglinton—Lawrence	Andrew Thomson	Former Saskatchewan Minister of Finance, MLA for Regina South	M	Toronto				
Elgin—Middlesex—London	Fred Sinclair	2011 candidate in this riding	M	St. Thomas	Assembler			
Essex	Tracey Ramsey		F	Belle River	Union facilitator			
Etobicoke Centre	Tanya De Mello		F	Toronto	Human rights lawyer			
Etobicoke North	Faisal Hassan	Former York South—Weston NDP riding association president	M	Etobicoke	Executive assistant			
Etobicoke—Lakeshore	Phil Trotter		M	Toronto	Lawyer			
Flamborough—Glanbrook	Mike DiLivio		M	Stoney Creek	Electrician			
Glengarry—Prescott—Russell	Normand Laurin		M	Vankleek Hill	IT technician			
Guelph	Andrew Seagram		M	Guelph	Education management			
Haldimand—Norfolk	John Harris	Grand Erie District School Board Trustee for Norfolk County	M	Simcoe	Teacher			
Haliburton—Kawartha Lakes—Brock	Mike Perry		M	Little Britain	Executive director			
Hamilton Centre	David Christopherson	Incumbent Member of Parliament	M	Hamilton	Trade unionist			
Hamilton East—Stoney Creek	Wayne Marston	Incumbent Member of Parliament	M	Hamilton	Property manager			
Hamilton Mountain	Scott Duvall	Hamilton City Councillor for Ward 7	M	Hamilton	Trade Unionist			
Hamilton West—Ancaster—Dundas	Alex Johnstone	Hamilton-Wentworth School Board Trustee for Ward 11 & 12, 2014 Ontario NDP candidate for Ancaster—Dundas—Flamborough—Westdale	F	Hamilton	Social planner, commentator			
Hastings—Lennox and Addington	Betty Bannon		F	Foxboro	Retired trade unionist			
Humber River—Black Creek	Darnel Harris		M					
Huron—Bruce	Gerard Creces		M					
Kanata—Carleton	John Hansen	2014 Ontario NDP candidate for Carleton—Mississippi Mills	M	Kanata	engineer			
Kenora	Howard Hampton	Former Leader, Ontario New Democratic Party, MPP for Kenora--Rainy River	M		Lawyer			
King—Vaughan	Natalie Rizzo	Former Toronto District School Board student trustee	F	King	Intake worker			
Kingston and the Islands	Daniel Beals	2011 candidate in this riding	M	Kingston	Logistics officer			
Kitchener Centre	Susan Cadell		F	Kitchener	Director, School of Social Work, Renison University College			
Kitchener—Conestoga	James Villeneuve	2014 Ontario NDP candidate in this riding	M	Kitchener	Trade unionist			
Kitchener South—Hespeler	Lorne Bruce	2011 candidate in Kitchener—Conestoga, Executive Board Vice-President of United Food and Commercial Workers Local 1977	M	New Hamburg	Trade unionist			
Lambton—Kent—Middlesex	Rex Isaac		M	Walpole Island	Teacher			
Lanark—Frontenac—Kingston	John Fenik	Mayor of Perth	M	Perth	Publisher			
Leeds—Grenville—Thousand Islands and Rideau Lakes	Margaret Andrade		F					
London—Fanshawe	Irene Mathyssen	Incumbent Member of Parliament	F	Ilderton	Teacher			
London North Centre	German Gutierrez	2011 candidate in this riding	M	London	Professor			
London West	Matthew Rowlinson		M	London	Professor, University of Western Ontario			
Markham—Stouffville	Gregory Hines		M	Stouffville	Music producer			
Markham—Thornhill	Senthi Chelliah		M	Markham	Businessman			
Markham—Unionville	Nadine Kormos Hawkins	2014 Ontario NDP candidate for this riding, 2011 and 2008 candidate in this riding; sister of former NDP MPP Peter Kormos	F	Markham	Businesswoman			
Milton	Alex Anabusi		M	Milton	Health care professional			
Mississauga Centre	Farheen Khan		F	Mississauga	Social worker			
Mississauga East—Cooksville	Ali Naqvi	2008 and 2006 candidate for Etobicoke North, 2000 candidate for Don Valley West and 2003 Ontario NDP candidate for Don Valley West	M	Oakville	Lawyer			
Mississauga—Erin Mills	Michelle Bilek	2014 Ontario NDP candidate for Mississauga—Erindale, 2011 candidate in Mississauga—Erindale and 2008 candidate in Oakville	F	Mississauga	Social services			
Mississauga—Lakeshore	Eric Guerbilsky	Former Mississauga South NDP Riding President	M	Mississauga	Human resources			
Mississauga—Malton	Dianne Douglas		F					
Mississauga—Streetsville	Fayaz Karim	2014 Ontario NDP candidate for Mississauga East—Cooksville	M	Mississauga	Political activist			
Nepean	Sean Devine		M	Trend-Arlington, Ottawa	Actor, and playwright			
Newmarket—Aurora	Yvonne Kelly		F	Tottenham	Anti-poverty activist			
Niagara Centre	Malcolm Allen	Incumbent Member of Parliament for Welland	M	Fenwick	Electrician			
Niagara Falls	Carolyn Ioannoni		F					
Niagara West	Nameer Rahman		M					
Nickel Belt	Claude Gravelle	Incumbent Member of Parliament	M	Chelmsford	Retired machinist, trade unionist			
Nipissing—Timiskaming	Kathleen Jodouin	Women and HIV Coordinator for the AIDS Committee of North Bay and Area	F	Astorville	HIV/AIDS activist			
Northumberland—Peterborough South	Russ Christianson	2011, 2008, 2006 and 2004 candidate in Northumberland—Quinte West	M	Campbellford	Consultant			
Oakville	Che Marville	2014 Ontario NDP candidate for this riding	F	Oakville	Entrepreneur			
Oakville North—Burlington	Janice Best		F					
Orléans	Nancy Tremblay Winfield		F	Ottawa	Farmer			
Oshawa	Mary Fowler		F	Oshawa	Educator			
Ottawa Centre	Paul Dewar	Incumbent Member of Parliament	M	Ottawa	Teacher			
Ottawa South	George Brown	Former Ottawa City Councillor	M	Ottawa	Lawyer			
Ottawa—Vanier	Emilie Taman		F	Ottawa	Lawyer			
Ottawa West—Nepean	Marlene Rivier	2011, 2008, and 2006 candidate in this riding	F					
Oxford	Zoe Kunschner	2006 and 2004 candidate in this riding	F	Ingersoll	Talent agency owner			
Parkdale—High Park	Peggy Nash	Incumbent Member of Parliament	F	Toronto	Labour representative			
Parry Sound-Muskoka	Matt McCarthy		M	Bracebridge	Translator			
Perth Wellington	Ethan Rabidoux		M	Stratford	Author			
Peterborough—Kawartha	Dave Nickle	2011 candidate in Peterborough	M	Peterborough	Teacher			
Pickering—Uxbridge	Pamela Downward		F	Pickering	Educator			
Renfrew—Nipissing—Pembroke	Dan McCarthy		M	Burnstown	Lawyer			
Richmond Hill	Adam DeVita	2014 Ontario NDP candidate for this riding and 2011 candidate in this riding	M	Richmond Hill	Engineer			
St. Catharines	Susan Erskine-Fournier		F	St. Catharines	Union Worker (United Way), Human Rights, and Women's Committee Member, and executive board member (UNIFOR)			
Sarnia—Lambton	Jason McMichael	Former national vice-president of the Customs and Immigration Union	M	Brights Grove	Canadian Customs Officer			
Sault Ste. Marie	Skip Morrison	Crane operator and financial advisor	M	Sault Ste. Marie	Steelworker			
Scarborough Centre	Alex Wilson	2014 Ontario NDP candidate for Scarborough—Agincourt	M	Scarborough	Pastor			
Scarborough North	Rathika Sitsabaiesan	Incumbent Member of Parliament for Scarborough—Rouge River	F	Scarborough	Labour relations specialist			
Scarborough Southwest	Dan Harris	Incumbent Member of Parliament	M	Scarborough	IT technician			
Scarborough—Agincourt	Laura Patrick		F	Toronto	Political staffer			
Scarborough-Guildwood	Laura Casselman		F					
Scarborough—Rouge Park	Kantharatnam Shanthikumar	Former cricket player for Canada and Sri Lanka national teams	M	Scarborough	Priest, cricket teacher			
Simcoe—Grey	David Matthews		M	Wasaga Beach	Retired pipe fitter			
Simcoe North	Richard Banigan	2011 and 2008 candidate in this riding, 2000 candidate in Etobicoke—Lakeshore and 1988 candidate in Oakville—Milton	M	Penetanguishene	Publisher			
Spadina—Fort York	Olivia Chow	Toronto mayoral candidate 2014, former MP for Trinity-Spadina	F	Toronto				
Stormont—Dundas—South Glengarry	Patrick Burger		M	Lunenburg	Teacher			
Sudbury	Paul Loewenberg		M					
Thornhill	Lorne Cherry		M					
Thunder Bay—Rainy River	John Rafferty	Incumbent Member of Parliament	M	Fort Frances	Self-employed			
Thunder Bay—Superior North	Andrew Foulds	2014 Ontario NDP candidate for this riding, Thunder Bay City Councillor for Current River Ward	M	Thunder Bay	Teacher			
Timmins-James Bay	Charlie Angus	Incumbent Member of Parliament	M	Cobalt	Parliamentarian			
Toronto Centre	Linda McQuaig	2013 by-election candidate in this riding	F	Toronto	Journalist			
Toronto—Danforth	Craig Scott	Incumbent Member of Parliament	M	Toronto	Lawyer			
Toronto—St. Paul's	Noah Richler		M	Toronto	Writer			
University—Rosedale	Jennifer Hollett	2013 NDP nomination candidate for Toronto Centre by-election, former MuchMusic VJ	F	Toronto	Digital Media Developer			
Vaughan—Woodbridge	Adriana Zichy		F	Toronto				
Waterloo	Diane Freeman	Waterloo City Councillor for Ward 4	F	Waterloo	Engineer			
Wellington—Halton Hills	Anne Gajerski-Cauley		F	Guelph	Minister			
Whitby	Ryan Kelly		M					
Willowdale	Pouyan Tabasinejad		M	Toronto	Administrator			
Windsor—Tecumseh	Cheryl Hardcastle	Former Deputy Mayor of Tecumseh	F	Tecumseh	Journalist			
Windsor West	Brian Masse	Incumbent Member of Parliament	M	Windsor	Professor			
York Centre	Hal Berman		M	Toronto	Physician			
York—Simcoe	Sylvia Gerl		F					
York South—Weston	Mike Sullivan	Incumbent Member of Parliament	M	Weston	Radio operator			

== Manitoba – 14 seats ==
Riding	Candidate's Name	Notes	Gender	Residence	Occupation	Votes	%	Rank
Brandon—Souris	Melissa Wastasecoot		F					
Charleswood—St. James—Assiniboia—Headingley	Stefan M. Jonosson	2014 Winnipeg City Council candidate for St.James-Brooklands ward.	M		Pastor			
Churchill—Keewatinook Aski	Niki Ashton	Incumbent Member of Parliament	F	Thompson	Instructor			
Dauphin—Swan River—Neepawa	Laverne Lewycky	Former Member of Parliament for Dauphin	M	Dauphin	Pastor			
Elmwood—Transcona	Daniel Blaikie	Son of former NDP Member of Parliament Bill Blaikie	M	Winnipeg	Electrician			
Kildonan—St. Paul	Suzanne Hrynyk	2014 Winnipeg City Council candidate for the Old Kildonan Ward, former Winnipeg School Division Chairwoman & Trustee for Ward 3	F	Winnipeg	Nurse			
Portage—Lisgar	Dean Harder							
Provencher	Les Lilley		M					
Saint Boniface—Saint Vital	Erin Selby		F					
Selkirk—Interlake—Eastman	Deborah Chief		F					
Winnipeg Centre	Pat Martin	Incumbent Member of Parliament	M	Winnipeg	Carpenter			
Winnipeg North	Levy Abad		M	Winnipeg	Public servant, musician			
Winnipeg South	Brianne Goertzen		F					
Winnipeg South Centre	Matt Henderson		M	Winnipeg	Teacher			

== Saskatchewan – 14 seats ==
Riding	Candidate's Name	Notes	Gender	Residence	Occupation	Votes	%	Rank
Battlefords—Lloydminster	Sandra Arias	Director of Operations, Sunchild Law	F	Battleford	Politician			
Carlton Trail—Eagle Creek	Glenn Wright		M	Vanscoy	Farmer, uranium mine manager			
Cypress Hills—Grasslands	Trevor Peterson		M	Assiniboia	Teacher			
Desnethé—Missinippi—Churchill River	Georgina Jolibois	Mayor of La Loche	F	La Loche	Politician			
Moose Jaw—Lake Centre—Lanigan	Dustan Hlady		M	Moose Jaw	Educational assistant			
Prince Albert	Lon Borgerson	Former Member of the Saskatchewan Legislative Assembly for Saskatchewan Rivers	M	MacDowall	Teacher			
Regina—Lewvan	Erin Weir	2004 candidate in Wascana, 2013 Saskatchewan NDP candidate for leadership. One of two NDP candidates in this election with the name Erin Weir (the other running in Medicine Hat—Cardston—Warner).	M	Regina	Economist			
Regina—Qu'Appelle	Nial Kuyek	Former General Manager of the Agricultural Producers of Saskatchewan	M	Regina	Retired			
Regina—Wascana	April Bourgeois		F	Regina	Management			
Saskatoon—Grasswood	Scott Bell		M	Saskatoon	Lawyer			
Saskatoon—University	Claire Card		F	Saskatoon	Veterinarian			
Saskatoon West	Sheri Benson	CEO of the United Way of Saskatoon	F	Saskatoon	Social Worker			
Souris—Moose Mountain	Vicky O'Dell		F	Weyburn	Union representative			
Yorkton—Melville	Doug Ottenbreit	2011 and 2008 candidate in this riding, 1993 candidate in Scarborough East	M	Melville	Lawyer			

== Alberta – 34 seats ==
Riding	Candidate's Name	Notes	Gender	Residence	Occupation	Votes	%	Rank
Banff—Airdrie	Joanne Boissoneault		F					
Battle River—Crowfoot	Katherine Swampy		F					
Bow River	Lynn Macwilliam		F					
Calgary Centre	Jillian Ratti		F					
Calgary Confederation	Kirk Heuser		M	Calgary	Journalist			
Calgary Forest Lawn	Abdou Souraya		M					
Calgary Heritage	Matt Masters Burgener		M	Calgary	Country Musician			
Calgary Midnapore	Laura Weston		F	Calgary	Lawyer			
Calgary Nose Hill	Bruce Kaufman		M					
Calgary Rocky Ridge	Stephanie Kot		F					
Calgary Shepard	Dany Allard		M	Calgary	IT advisor			
Calgary Signal Hill	Khalis Ahmed		M					
Calgary Skyview	Sahajvir Singh Randhawa		M					
Edmonton Centre	Gil McGowan	President, Alberta Federation of Labour	M	Edmonton				
Edmonton Griesbach	Janis Irwin		F	Edmonton	High school teacher			
Edmonton Manning	Aaron Paquette		M	Edmonton	Artist, author			
Edmonton Mill Woods	Jasvir Deol		M					
Edmonton Riverbend	Brian Fleck		M		Professor			
Edmonton Strathcona	Linda Duncan	Incumbent Member of Parliament	F	Edmonton	Environmental law consultant			
Edmonton West	Heather Mackenzie	Former Edmonton Public Schools trustee	F	Edmonton				
Edmonton—Wetaskiwin	Fritz Kathryn Bitz		F					
Foothills	Alison Thompson		F					
Fort McMurray—Cold Lake	Melody Lepine		F					
Grande Prairie-Mackenzie	Saba Mossagizi		F					
Lakeland	Duane Zaraska		M					
Lethbridge	Cheryl Meheden	2010 Lethbridge mayoral candidate	F	Lethbridge	Grocery store owner			
Medicine Hat—Cardston—Warner	Erin Weir	One of two NDP candidates in this election with the name Erin Weir (the other running in Regina—Lewvan).	F					
Peace River—Westlock	Cameron Alexis		M					
Red Deer—Lacombe	Doug Hart		M					
Red Deer—Mountain View	Paul Harris		M					
Sherwood Park—Fort Saskatchewan	Joanne Cave		F					
St. Albert—Edmonton	Darlene Malayko		F					
Sturgeon River—Parkland	Guy Desforges		M					
Yellowhead	Ken Kuzminski		M					

== British Columbia – 42 seats ==
Riding	Candidate's Name	Notes	Gender	Residence	Occupation	Votes	%	Rank
Abbotsford	Jennifer Martel		F	Abbotsford	Biologist, dance instructor, life guard/swimming instructor			
Burnaby North—Seymour	Carol Baird Ellan	1st female Chief Judge of the Provincial Court of British Columbia	F	North Vancouver	Retired judge			
Burnaby South	Kennedy Stewart	Incumbent Member of Parliament	M	Burnaby	Professor			
Cariboo—Prince George	Trent Derrick		M	Prince George	Businessman			
Central Okanagan—Similkameen—Nicola	Angelique Wood	Former Regional District of Okanagan-Similkameen Board Member for Area G	F	Hedley	Sales and marketing			
Chilliwack—Hope	Seonaigh McPherson		F	Chilliwack	Professor			
Cloverdale—Langley City	Rebecca Smith	Executive Director of the Surrey Hospice Society, founding member and former President of BullyFree BC	F	Langley	Business Owner & Consultant			
Coquitlam—Port Coquitlam	Sara Norman		F	Coquitlam	Journalist			
Courtenay—Alberni	Gord Johns	Executive Director of the Tofino-Long Beach Chamber of Commerce, former member of Tofino City Council	M	Tofino	Consultant			
Cowichan—Malahat—Langford	Alistair MacGregor	President of the Cowichan Valley BC NDP Association	M	Duncan	Farmer			
Delta	Jeremy Leveque		M					
Esquimalt—Saanich—Sooke	Randall Garrison	Incumbent Member of Parliament	M	Esquimalt	Instructor			
Fleetwood—Port Kells	Garry Begg		M	Surrey	RCMP inspector			
Kamloops—Thompson—Cariboo	Bill Sundhu	Former Provincial Court of British Columbia judge	M	Kamloops	Lawyer			
Kelowna—Lake Country	Norah Bowman		F	Kelowna	Professor			
Kootenay—Columbia	Wayne Stetski	Former Mayor of Cranbrook	M	Cranbrook	Conservationist			
Langley—Aldergrove	Margot Sangster	Worked in Afghanistan as technical advisor for workforce development	F		Psychotherapist			
Mission—Matsqui—Fraser Canyon	Dennis Adamson	Director, Electoral Area B, Fraser Valley Regional District	M		Administrator			
Nanaimo—Ladysmith	Sheila Malcolmson	Member of the Islands Trust Council for Gabriola Island	F	Gabriola Island	Environmentalist			
New Westminster—Burnaby	Peter Julian	Incumbent Member of Parliament	M	New Westminster	Financial administrator			
North Island—Powell River	Rachel Blaney	Executive Director of the Multicultural and Immigrant Services Association of North Vancouver Island	F	Campbell River	Community activist			
North Okanagan—Shuswap	Jacqui Gingras		F	Falkland	Professor			
North Vancouver	Carleen Thomas	Tsleil-Waututh First Nation Band Councillor	F	North Vancouver	Teacher			
Pitt Meadows—Maple Ridge	Bob D'Eith	Executive Director of Music B.C.	M	Maple Ridge	Lawyer			
Port Moody—Coquitlam	Fin Donnelly	Incumbent Member of Parliament	M	Coquitlam	Environmentalist			
Prince George—Peace River—Northern Rockies	Kathi Dickie		F					
Richmond Centre	Jack Trovato		M		Teacher			
Saanich—Gulf Islands	Alicia Cormier		F	Central Saanich	City Councillor			
Skeena—Bulkley Valley	Nathan Cullen	Incumbent Member of Parliament	M	Smithers	Consultant			
South Okanagan—West Kootenay	Richard Cannings	2013 British Columbia NDP candidate for Penticton	M	Penticton	Biologist			
South Surrey—White Rock	Pixie Hobby		F	Surrey	Lawyer			
Steveston—Richmond East	Scott Stewart	2013 British Columbia NDP candidate for Richmond-Steveston	M	Richmond	Businessman, police officer			
Surrey Centre	Jasbir Sandhu	Incumbent Member of Parliament	M	Surrey	Program coordinator			
Surrey—Newton	Jinny Sims	Incumbent Member of Parliament, former President of the British Columbia Teachers' Federation	F	Surrey	Educator			
Vancouver Centre	Constance Barnes	Former Member of the Vancouver Park Board, Daughter of Former BC MLA Emery Barnes	F	Vancouver	Executive Manager			
Vancouver East	Jenny Kwan	Member of the British Columbia Legislative Assembly for Vancouver-Mount Pleasant	F	Vancouver	Community legal advocate			
Vancouver Granville	Mira Oreck		F	Vancouver	Director of Public Engagement, Broadbent Institute			
Vancouver Kingsway	Don Davies	Incumbent Member of Parliament	M	Vancouver	Lawyer			
Vancouver Quadra	Scott Andrews		M	Vancouver	Community support worker			
Vancouver South	Amandeep Nijjar		F	Vancouver	Union Finance			
Victoria	Murray Rankin	Incumbent Member of Parliament	M	Victoria	Lawyer			
West Vancouver—Sunshine Coast—Sea to Sky Country	Larry Koopman		M	Gibsons	Businessman			

== Yukon – 1 seat ==
Riding	Candidate's Name	Notes	Gender	Residence	Occupation	Votes	%	Rank
Yukon	Melissa Atkinson		F		Lawyer			

== Northwest Territories – 1 seat ==
Riding	Candidate's Name	Notes	Gender	Residence	Occupation	Votes	%	Rank
Northwest Territories	Dennis Bevington	Incumbent Member of Parliament	M	Fort Smith	Businessman			

== Nunavut – 1 seat ==
Riding	Candidate's Name	Notes	Gender	Residence	Occupation	Votes	%	Rank
Nunavut	Jack Anawak	Former Liberal MP for Eastern Arctic	M		Politician			

== See also ==
- Results of the Canadian federal election, 2015
- Results by riding for the Canadian federal election, 2015
