= Denise Poirier-Rivard =

Canadian politician

Denise Poirier-Rivard (born May 19, 1941) is a Canadian politician. Poirier-Rivard was a Bloc Québécois member of the House of Commons of Canada representing the district of Châteauguay—Saint-Constant. First elected in the 2004 election. Poirier-Rivard was the Bloc's critic of the Agriculture and Agri-Food.

Born in Montreal, Quebec, Poirier-Rivard was a cheese maker and farmer.

Parliament of Canada
Preceded by Electoral district created. See Châteauguay	Member of Parliament for Châteauguay—Saint-Constant; 2004-2006	Succeeded by Carole Freeman, Bloc Québécois
