= Carole Freeman =

Canadian politician and lawyer

Carole Freeman MP

Member of Parliament for Châteauguay—Saint-Constant
- In office 2006–2011
- Preceded by: Denise Poirier-Rivard
- Succeeded by: Sylvain Chicoine

Personal details
- Born: January 10, 1949 (age 77) Saint-Urbain, Quebec
- Party: Bloc Québécois
- Profession: lawyer

Carole Freeman (born January 10, 1949) is a lawyer and politician in Quebec. She was a Member of Parliament representing the Bloc Québécois for the riding of Châteauguay—Saint-Constant from 2006 to 2011.
