= Châteauguay—Saint-Constant =

Former federal electoral district in Quebec, Canada

Quebec electoral district
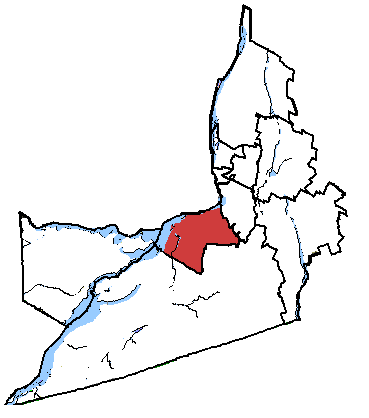
- Châteauguay—Saint-Constant in relation to other Montérégie federal electoral districts

Defunct federal electoral district
- Legislature: House of Commons
- District created: 2003
- District abolished: 2012
- First contested: 2004
- Last contested: 2011
- District webpage: profile, map

Demographics
- Population (2011): 113,459
- Electors (2011): 84,347
- Area (km²): 300.30
- Census division(s): Roussillon RCM
- Census subdivision(s): Châteauguay, Delson, Léry, Mercier, Saint-Constant, Saint-Isidore, Sainte-Catherine

Châteauguay—Saint-Constant (French pronunciation: [ʃatoɡɛ sɛ̃ kɔ̃stɑ̃]) was a federal electoral district in Quebec, Canada, that was represented in the House of Commons of Canada from 2004 to 2015. Its population in 2006 was 107,165.

Châteauguay—Saint-Constant was created in 2003 from Châteauguay riding, with the exception of a portion of Châteauguay that was transferred in Beauharnois—Salaberry and Saint-Jean ridings.

== Geography ==
The district included all of the Regional County Municipality of Roussillon including Kahnawake Indian Reserve No. 14, but excluding the cities of Candiac and La Prairie and the Municipality of Saint-Philippe in the east of the county municipality. The neighbouring ridings were Vaudreuil—Soulanges, Beauharnois—Salaberry, Brossard—La Prairie, LaSalle—Émard, Notre-Dame-de-Grâce—Lachine, and Lac-Saint-Louis.

=== Members of Parliament ===
This riding has elected the following members of parliament:

Parliament	Years	Member	Party
Châtueauguay—Saint-Constant; Riding created from Châteauguay
38th	2004–2006	Denise Poirier-Rivard	Bloc Québécois
39th	2006–2008	Carole Freeman	Bloc Québécois
40th	2008–2011	Carole Freeman	Bloc Québécois
41st	2011–2015	Sylvain Chicoine	New Democratic
Riding dissolved into Châteauguay—Lacolle and La Prairie

== Election results ==
2011 Canadian federal election
Party	Candidate	Votes	%	±%	Expenditures
New Democratic	Sylvain Chicoine	29,156	52.03	+37.02	
Bloc Québécois	Carole Freeman	14,957	26.69	-18.89	
Conservative	André Turcôt	5,766	10.29	-7.56	
Liberal	Linda Schwey	5,069	9.05	-9.30	
Green	Clara Kwan	923	1.65	-1.53	
Marxist–Leninist	Linda Sullivan	163	0.29	-	
Total valid votes/expense limit		56,023	100.00		
Total rejected ballots		786	1.38	-0.30	
Turnout		56,809	64.02	-2.34	
Eligible voters		88,741	–	–	

2008 Canadian federal election
Party	Candidate	Votes	%	±%	Expenditures
Bloc Québécois	Carole Freeman	25,086	45.58	-5.80	$39,329
Liberal	Linda Schwey	10,104	18.35	-2.04	$11,741
Conservative	Pierre-Paul Routhier	9,827	17.85	-0.87	$87,060
New Democratic	Sonia Jurado	8,261	15.01	+9.80	$6,122
Green	Brian Sarwer-Foner	1,755	3.18	-1.14	
Total valid votes/expense limit		55,033	100.00	$88,185	
Rejected ballots		941	1.68		
Turnout		55,974	66.36		

2006 Canadian federal election
Party	Candidate	Votes	%	±%	Expenditures
Bloc Québécois	Carole Freeman	28,274	51.38	-5.91	$38,718
Liberal	Charles Ghorayeb	11,219	20.39	-9.65	$40,897
Conservative	Rosaire Turcot	10,301	18.72	+13.05	$7,222
New Democratic	Ehsan Mohammadian	2,865	5.21	+1.88	$2,050
Green	Alain Rioux	2,375	4.3	+0.63	$0
Total valid votes/expense limit		55,034	100.00	$81,631	

2004 Canadian federal election
Party	Candidate	Votes	%	±%	Expenditures
Bloc Québécois	Denise Poirier-Rivard	29,337	57.28	–	$65,854
Liberal	Robert Lanctôt	15,384	30.04	–	$41,537
Conservative	Rosaire Turcot	2,902	5.67	–	$11,347
Green	Marc-André Gadoury	1,889	3.69	–	$2,629
New Democratic	Mélanie Archambault	1,704	3.33	–	
Total valid votes/expense limit		51,216	100.00	$79,916	

== See also ==
- List of Canadian electoral districts
- Historical federal electoral districts of Canada
