= Sylvain Chicoine =

Canadian politician

Member of Parliament for Châteauguay—Saint-Constant
- In office May 2, 2011 – August 4, 2015
- Preceded by: Carole Freeman
- Succeeded by: Brenda Shanahan

Personal details
- Born: July 19, 1970 (age 56) Ville-Émard, Quebec, Canada
- Party: New Democratic Party
- Education: Collège de Maisonneuve
- Profession: Special constable

Sylvain Chicoine (born July 19, 1970) is a Canadian politician, who was elected to the House of Commons of Canada in the 2011 election. He represented the electoral district of Châteauguay—Saint-Constant as a member of the New Democratic Party until 2015.

Prior to being elected, he worked as a Special Constable at the Université de Montréal and has a diploma in police technology from Collège de Maisonneuve.
