= Dorval (disambiguation) =

Dorval is an on-island city on the Island of Montreal, Quebec, Canada.

Dorval may also refer to:

== People ==
- Marie Dorval (1798-1849), French actress
- Onésime Dorval (1845-1932), the first certified teacher in Saskatchewan, Canada
- Napoléon Dorval (1878-1955), Canadian hockey coach
- Dorval (footballer) (1935-2021), Dorval Rodrigues, Brazilian footballer
- Alain Dorval (1946-2024), French voice actor
- Monferrier Dorval (1956-2020), Haitian jurist
- Anne Dorval (born 1960), Canadian actress
- Deck Dorval, pseudonym for Frans van Dooren, Jef Beeckmans, and Jos Deckkers for books published in Esperanto

== Places ==
- Dorval International Airport, alternate name for Montréal–Trudeau International Airport, airport in Dorval, Canada
- L'Île-Dorval, city in Quebec, Canada
- Dorval–L'Île-Dorval, former borough in Quebec, Canada that split into Dorval and L'Île-Dorval
- Dorval—Lachine—LaSalle, federal election district in Quebec, Canada
- Dorval River, tributary of the Sanguenay river, in Quebec, Canada
- Dorval-Jean-XXIII, high school in Dorval, Montreal
- Dorval station (Via Rail), via rail in Dorval, Montreal
- Dorval station (Exo), intermodal and commuter rail station in Dorval, Canada
