= L'Île-Dorval =

- City
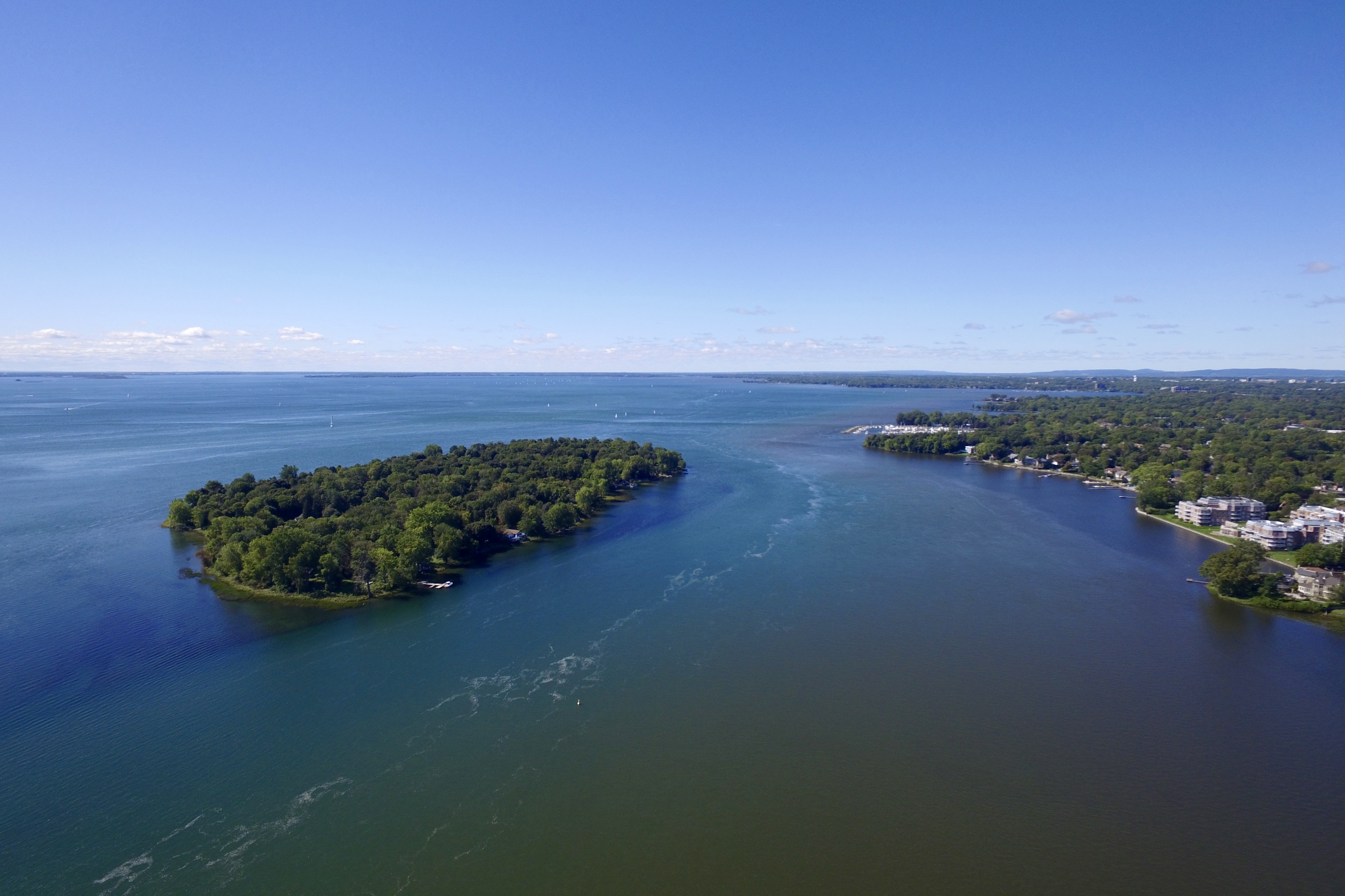

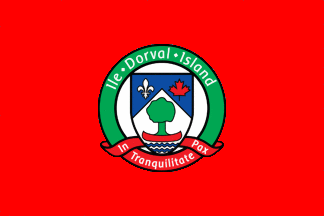
- Flag

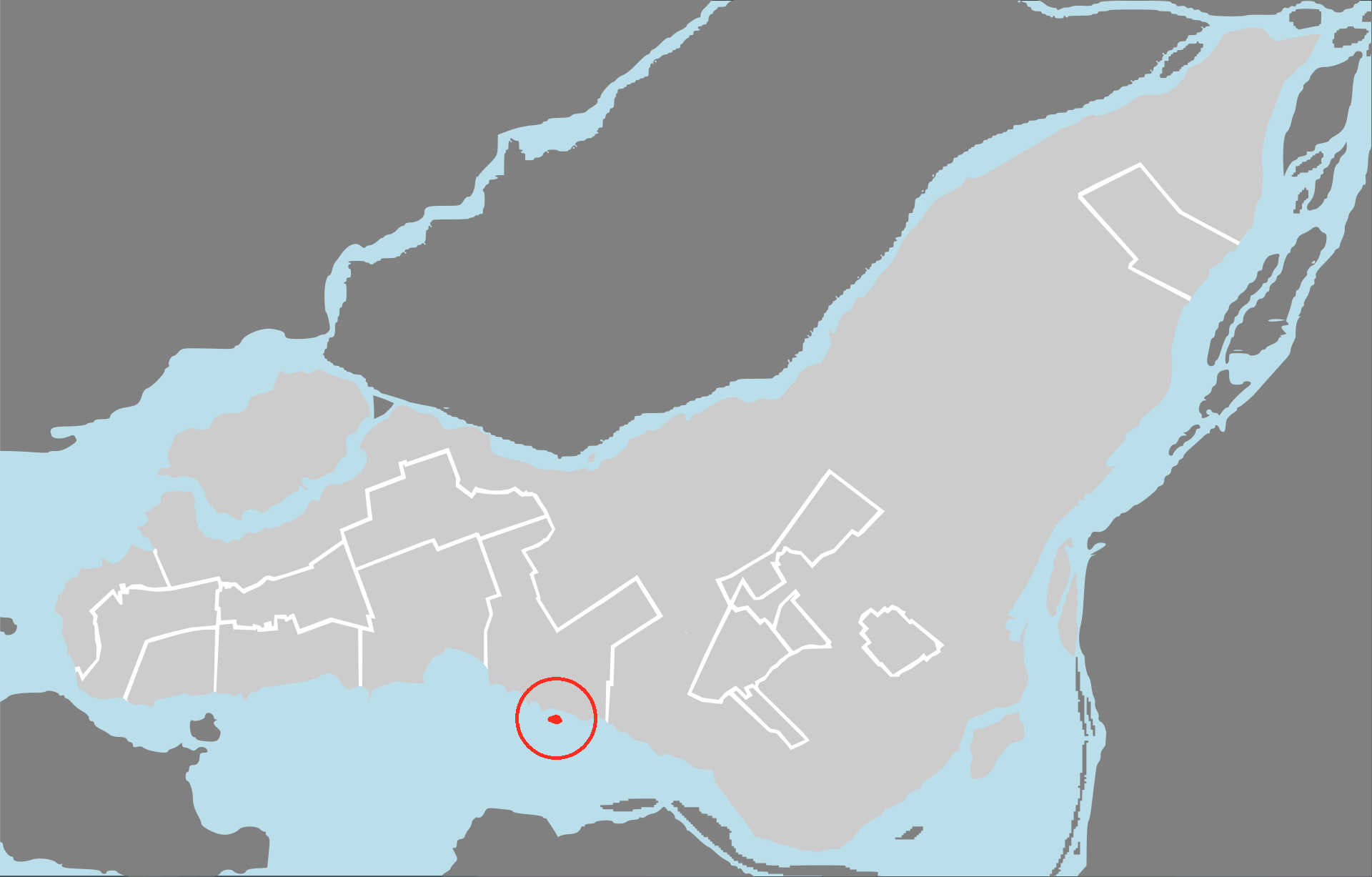
- Location within Montreal region

- Location in southern Quebec
- Coordinates: 45°25′56″N 73°44′29″W
- Country: Canada
- Province: Quebec
- Region: Montreal
- RCM: None
- Constituted: January 1, 2006

Government
  - Mayor: Peter Steinmetz
  - Fed. riding: Dorval—Lachine—LaSalle
  - Prov. riding: Marquette

Area
  - Total: 0.19 km^{2} (0.073 sq mi)
  - Land: 0.19 km^{2} (0.073 sq mi)

Population (2021)
  - Total: 30
  - Density: 154.7/km^{2} (401/sq mi)
  - Pop (2016-21): ▲500%
  - Dwellings: 79
- Time zone: UTC−5 (EST)
  - Summer (DST): UTC−4 (EDT)
- Postal code(s): H9S 5W4
- Area codes: 514 and 438
- Highways: No major routes
- Website: liledorvalisland.ca

L'Île-Dorval (French pronunciation: [lil dɔʁval]) is a city in southwestern Quebec, Canada. It is coterminous with Dorval Island (French: Île Dorval, also Town of Dorval Island), an island in Lake Saint-Louis off the Island of Montreal. It lies a short distance offshore from the city of Dorval and is connected with a seasonal semi-private ferry service.

A cottaging spot, it had only 30 permanent residents as of the Canada 2021 Census, making it one of the smallest municipalities in Canada, both in terms of area and population. In the 2001 census the official population had dropped to zero, according to Statistics Canada. However, because not only permanent residents but also property owners are eligible to vote in municipal elections in Quebec, there were 50 registered voters in 2004.

== History ==
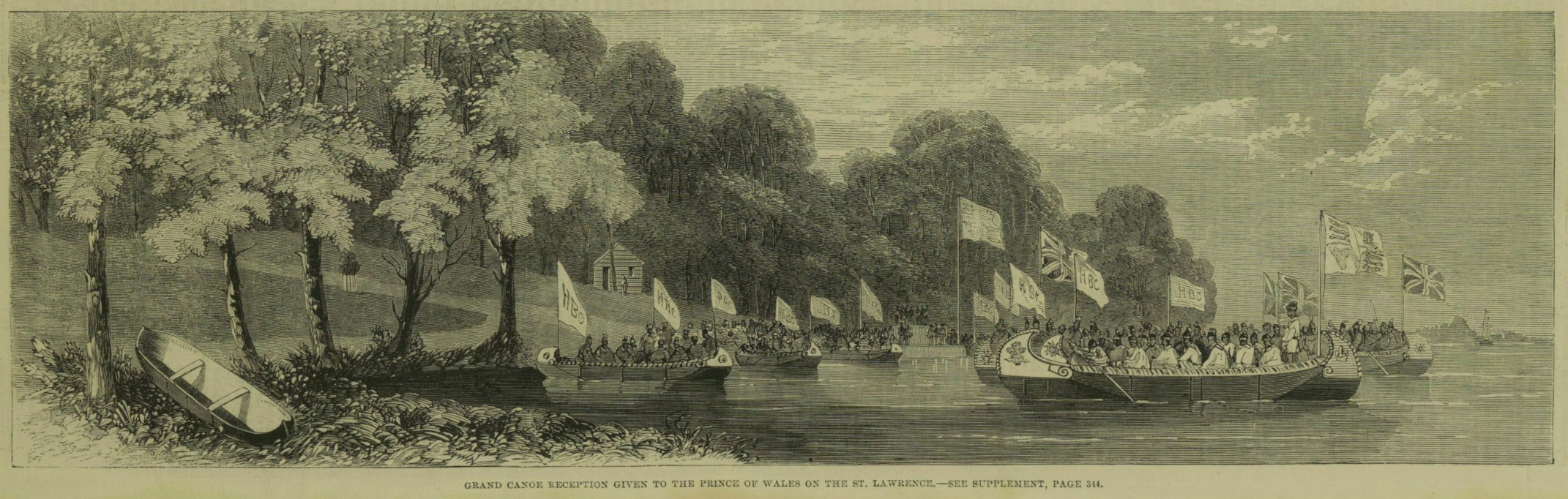
Grand canoe reception given to the Prince of Wales at Dorval Island, 1860

In 1691, the fief of Fort La Presentation, which included the island, was acquired by Jean-Baptiste Bouchard (born around 1658), who used to sign his name as Jean-Baptiste Bouchard Dorval. "d'Orval" (French for "of Orval") referred to his father's hometown of Orval in Montigny-Lengrain, France.

Around the middle of the 19th century, the island was acquired by George Simpson, Governor of the Hudson Bay Company, who held an elaborate reception for the Prince of Wales at the island in August 1860.

The formation of the island into a town was the initiative of the Dorval Island Park Company and a group of businessmen who wanted to provide the island with electricity, water, streets, and even a tram to support residential development. On March 5, 1915, Ville d'Ile Dorval was created by separating from the City of Dorval (orthography was adjusted in 1969 to Île-Dorval and in 1987 to L'Île-Dorval). Between 1949 and 1970, a seasonal post office operated there under the English name Dorval Island.

On January 1, 2002, as part of the 2002–2006 municipal reorganization of Montreal, it merged with the city of Montreal to become part of the borough of Dorval–L'Île-Dorval. After a change of government and a 2004 referendum it became independent once again, effective January 1, 2006.

== Demographics ==
In the 2021 Census of Population conducted by Statistics Canada, L'Île-Dorval had a population of 30 living in 25 of its 79 total private dwellings, a change of 500% from its 2016 population of 5. With a land area of 0.19 km^{2} (0.073 sq mi), it had a population density of 157.9/km^{2} (408.9/sq mi) in 2021.

Historical census populations – L'Île-Dorval

Year	Pop.	±%
1921	59	—
1931	19	−67.8%
1941	18	−5.3%
1951	17	−5.6%
1956	2	−88.2%
1961	2	+0.0%

Year	Pop.	±%
1966	7	+250.0%
1971	7	+0.0%
1976	8	+14.3%
1981	15	+87.5%
1986	5	−66.7%
1991	4	−20.0%

Year	Pop.	±%
1996	2	−50.0%
2001	0	−100.0%
2006	0	0.00%
2011	5	—
2016	5	+0.0%
2021	30	+500.0%

Source: Statistics Canada

== Local government ==
L'Île-Dorval forms part of the federal electoral district of Dorval—Lachine—LaSalle and has been represented by Anju Dhillon of the Liberal Party since 2015. Provincially, L'Île-Dorval is part of the Marquette electoral district and is represented by Enrico Ciccone of the Quebec Liberal Party since 2018.

L'Île-Dorval federal election results
Year	Liberal		Conservative		Bloc Québécois		New Democratic		Green	
2021	46%	6	21%	3	8%	1	15%	2	6%	1
2019	56%	9	23%	4	7%	1	4%	1	8%	1

List of former mayors:

- Cecil Leonard Carsley (1915–1933)
- T. Ingledow (1933–1935)
- W. D. Walker (1935–1937)
- H. S. T. Piper (1937–1951)
- Philipp A. Sargent (1951–1955)
- F. A. Johnson (1955–1959)
- Alan Easton (1959–1961)
- J. Carlyle Gordon (1961–1963)
- Paul L'Anglais (1963–1965)
- Yves J. Adams (1965–1966)
- William Scholes (1966–1968)
- Carl Nonod (1968–1973)
- Elliott Emanuel (1973–1980)
- William Hicks (1980–1985)
- Peter C. Briant (1985–1992)
- Gisèle Chapleau (1992–2002, 2006–2025)
- Peter Steinmetz (2025–present)

== Transportation ==
Dorval Island is accessible by a semi-private ferry, operating from May to October, only available to the island's residents and their invited guests.

The island is vehicle free, except for a pickup truck for garbage collection.

== Education ==
The French-language school board is the Centre de services scolaire Marguerite-Bourgeoys (CSSMB) Previously it was in the Commission scolaire Marguerite-Bourgeoys.

The English-language school district is the Lester B. Pearson School Board. L'Île-Dorval is in the attendance zone for Dorval Elementary School (French: École primaire Dorval).

== See also ==
- Hochelaga Archipelago
- List of islands of Quebec
