= Commission scolaire Marguerite-Bourgeoys =

Canadian school board

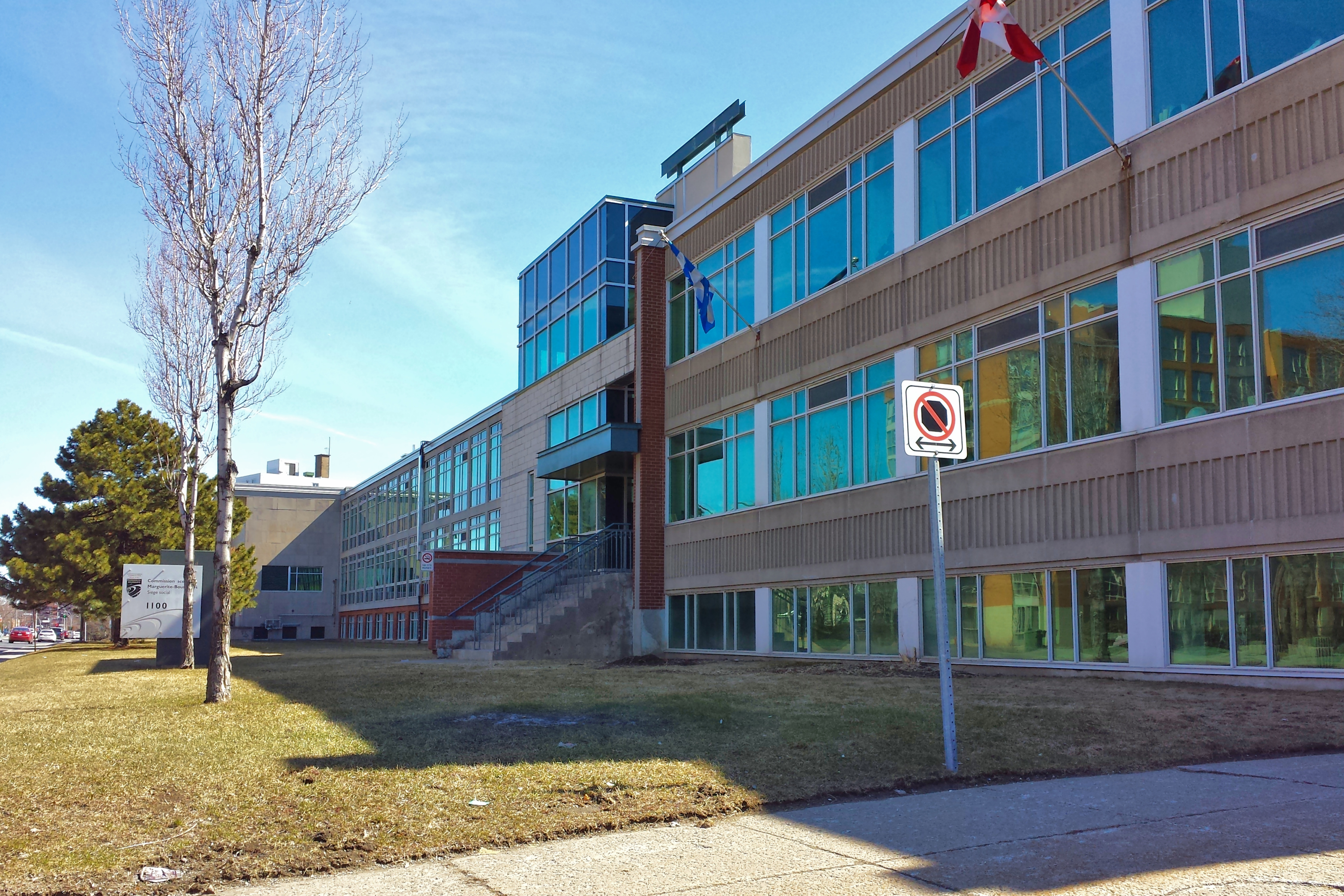
Head office of CSMB along Côte-Vertu Boulevard in Saint-Laurent

The Marguerite-Bourgeoys School Board (Commission scolaire Marguerite-Bourgeoys) was a French-language public school board on Montreal Island, Quebec, Canada. Its headquarters was in the Saint-Laurent borough of Montreal. Its education centre was in LaSalle, also in Montreal. It was named after Marguerite Bourgeoys (1620–1700), a French nun who helped start education infrastructure in the new colony.

== History ==
The school district was created on July 1, 1998, as a result of a law passed by the Quebec government that changed the school board system from denominational to linguistic.

In 2005–2006 the teachers went on strike to increase funds for the schools and smaller class sizes (average of 30 students per class) because it was becoming difficult to teach the students. To help the teachers, the schools now employ resource teachers.

In 2014 the government of Quebec planned to move 66 schools from the Commission scolaire de Montréal (CSDM) to the CSMB. That year the school board chairperson Diane Lamarche-Venne stated that the CSMB was unaware that Quebec planned to move the schools and that it had never lobbied for that.

On June 15, 2020, the Centre de services scolaire Marguerite-Bourgeoys replaced the former Commission scolaire Marguerite-Bourgeoys.

== Schools ==
=== Secondary schools ===
- École secondaire Cavelier-De LaSalle (LaSalle)
- Collège Saint-Louis (Montréal) (Lachine)
- École secondaire Dalbé-Viau (Lachine)
- École secondaire des Sources (Dollard-des-Ormeaux)
- École secondaire Dorval-Jean-XXIII (Dorval)
- École secondaire Félix-Leclerc (Pointe-Claire)
- École secondaire Monseigneur-Richard (Verdun)
- École secondaire Mont-Royal (Mont-Royal)
- École secondaire Paul-Gérin-Lajoie-d'Outremont (Outremont)
- École secondaire Pierre-Laporte (Mont-Royal)
- École secondaire Saint-Georges (Senneville)
- École secondaire Saint-Laurent (Saint-Laurent)

=== Primary schools ===
- École primaire Académie Saint-Clément (Mont-Royal)
- École primaire Beaconsfield (Beaconsfield)
- École primaire Beau-Séjour (Saint-Laurent)
- École primaire Bois-Franc-Aquarelle (Saint-Laurent)
- École primaire Cardinal-Léger (Saint-Laurent)
- École primaire Catherine-Soumillard (Lachine)
- École primaire Chanoine-Joseph-Théorêt (Verdun)
- École primaire de la Mosaïque (Côte-Saint-Luc)
- École primaire des Amis-du-Monde (Côte-Saint-Luc)
- École primaire des Berges-de-Lachine (Lachine)
- École primaire des Découvreurs (LaSalle)
- École primaire des Grands-Êtres (Saint-Laurent)
- École primaires des Marguerite (Verdun)
- École primaire Dollard-Des Ormeaux (Dollard-des-Ormeaux)
- École primaire du Bois-de-Liesse (Dollard-des-Ormeaux)
- École primaire du Bout-de-l'Isle (Sainte-Anne-de-Bellevue)
- École primaire du Grand-Chêne (Pierrefonds-Roxboro)
- École primaire du Grand-Héron (LaSalle)
- École primaire du Petit-Collège (LaSalle)
- École primaire Édouard-Laurin (Saint-Laurent)
- École primaire Émile-Nelligan (Kirkland)
- École primaire Enfants-du-Monde (Saint-Laurent)
- École primaire Enfant-Soleil (Saint-Laurent)
- École primaire Gentilly (Dorval)
- École primaire Guy-Drummond (Outremont)
- École primaire Harfang-des-Neiges (Pierrefonds-Roxboro)
- École primaire Henri-Beaulieu (Saint-Laurent)
- École primaire Henri-Forest (Lasalle)
- École primaire Île-des-Soeurs (Verdun)
- École primaire Jacques-Bizard (L'Île-Bizard–Sainte-Geneviève)
- École primaire Jardin-des-Saints-Anges (Lachine)
- École primaire Jean-Grou (Saint-Laurent)
- École primaire Jonathan (Saint-Laurent)
- École primaire Jonathan-Wilson (L'Île-Bizard–Sainte-Geneviève)
- École primaire Joseph-Henrico (Baie-D'Urfé)
- École primaire Katimavik-Hébert (Saint-Laurent)
- École primaire Lajoie (Outremont)
- École primaire Lalande (Pierrefonds-Roxboro)
- École primaire Laurendeau-Dunton (LaSalle)
- École primaire Laurentide (Saint-Laurent)
- École primaire L'Eau-Vive (LaSsalle)
- École primaire Lévis-Sauvé (Verdun)
- École primaire Marguerite-Bourgeoys (Pointe-Claire)
- École primaire Martin-Bélanger (Lachine)
- École primaire Murielle-Dumont (Pierrefonds-Roxboro)
- École primaire Notre-Dame-de-la-Garde (Verdun)
- École primaire Notre-Dame-de-la-Paix (Verdun)
- École primaire Notre-Dame-de-Lourdes (Verdun)
- École primaire Notre-Dame-des-Rapides (Lasalle)
- École primaire Notre-Dame-des-Sept-Douleurs (Verdun)
- École primaire Nouvelle-Querbes (Outremont)
- École primaire Paul-Jarry (Lachine)
- École primaire Perce-Neige (Pierrefonds-Roxboro)
- École primaire Philippe-Morin (Lachine)
- École primaire Pierre-Rémy (LaSalle)
- École primaire Pointe-Claire (Pointe-Claire)
- École primaire Saint-Clément (Mont-Royal)
- École primaire Sainte-Catherine-Labouré (LaSalle)
- École primaire Sainte-Geneviève (Ouest) (L'Île-Bizard–Sainte-Geneviève)
- École primaire Sainte-Geneviève (Sud) (LaSalle)
- École primaire Saint-Gérard (Pierrefonds-Roxboro)
- École primaire Saint-Germain-d'Outremont (Outremont)
- École primaire Saint-Louis (Pointe-Claire)
- École primaire Saint-Luc (Dollard-des-Ormeaux)
- École primaire Saint-Rémi (Beaconsfield)
- École primaire Terre-des-Jeunes (LaSalle)
- École primaire Très-Saint-Sacrement (Lachine)
- École primaire Victor-Thérien (Lachine)

=== Specialized schools ===
- Le secondaire adapté à ta situation (SAS) (Outremont)
- École primaire et secondaire John-F.-Kennedy (Beaconsfield)
- École Rose-Virginie-Pelletier (RVP) (Pierrefonds-Roxboro)

=== Adult education centres ===
- Centre d'éducation des adultes Champlain (Verdun)
- Centre d'éducation des adultes de LaSalle (Lachine and LaSalle)
- Centre d'éducation des adultes Outremont (Outremont)

=== Professional development centres ===
- Centre de formation professionnelle Léonard-De Vinci (Saint-Laurent)
- Centre de formation professionnelle des métiers de la santé (Kirkland)
- Collège d'informatique et d'administration Verdun-LaSalle (Verdun)
- Centre intégré de mécanique, de métallurgie et d'électricité (CIMME) (LaSalle)
