= Dorval railway station =

Dorval railway station may refer to either train station in Dorval:

- Dorval station (RTM), the commuter station
- Dorval station (Via Rail), the long-distance station
