= François Ouimet =

Canadian politician and lawyer

Member of the National Assembly of Quebec for Marquette
- In office September 12, 1994 – October 1, 2018
- Preceded by: Claude Dauphin
- Succeeded by: Enrico Ciccone

Personal details
- Born: August 20, 1959 (age 67) Montreal, Quebec
- Party: Quebec Liberal Party
- Profession: lawyer
- Portfolio: Transport

François Ouimet (born August 20, 1959 in Montreal, Quebec) is a former Quebec politician and lawyer. He is the former Member of National Assembly for the riding of Marquette in Montreal. He represented the Quebec Liberal Party.

Ouimet studied at the Université de Montréal and obtained a bachelor's degree in Canadian literature. He also received a bachelor's degree in civil law and common law at McGill University. In 1989 he was admitted to the Quebec Bar, the Canadian Bar and the Montreal Bar. He was a lawyer between 1990 and 1994 before joining provincial politics. He was a commissioner and president of the Catholic School Board of Montreal.

Ouimet was first elected in Marquette in 1994 and re-elected in 1998, 2003, 2007, 2008, 2012 and 2014. He served as opposition critic in primary and secondary education, justice and government services. Ouimet was re-elected in 2003 and was named the Chair of the Territorial Planning Commission. He was re-elected again in 2007 and named parliamentary secretary to the Minister of Transport. He was asked by the Liberal Party leader to step aside in the 2018 election. He retired from politics after 24 years in the National Assembly.
