= Dorval =

- City
- City of Dorval; Cité de Dorval (French)
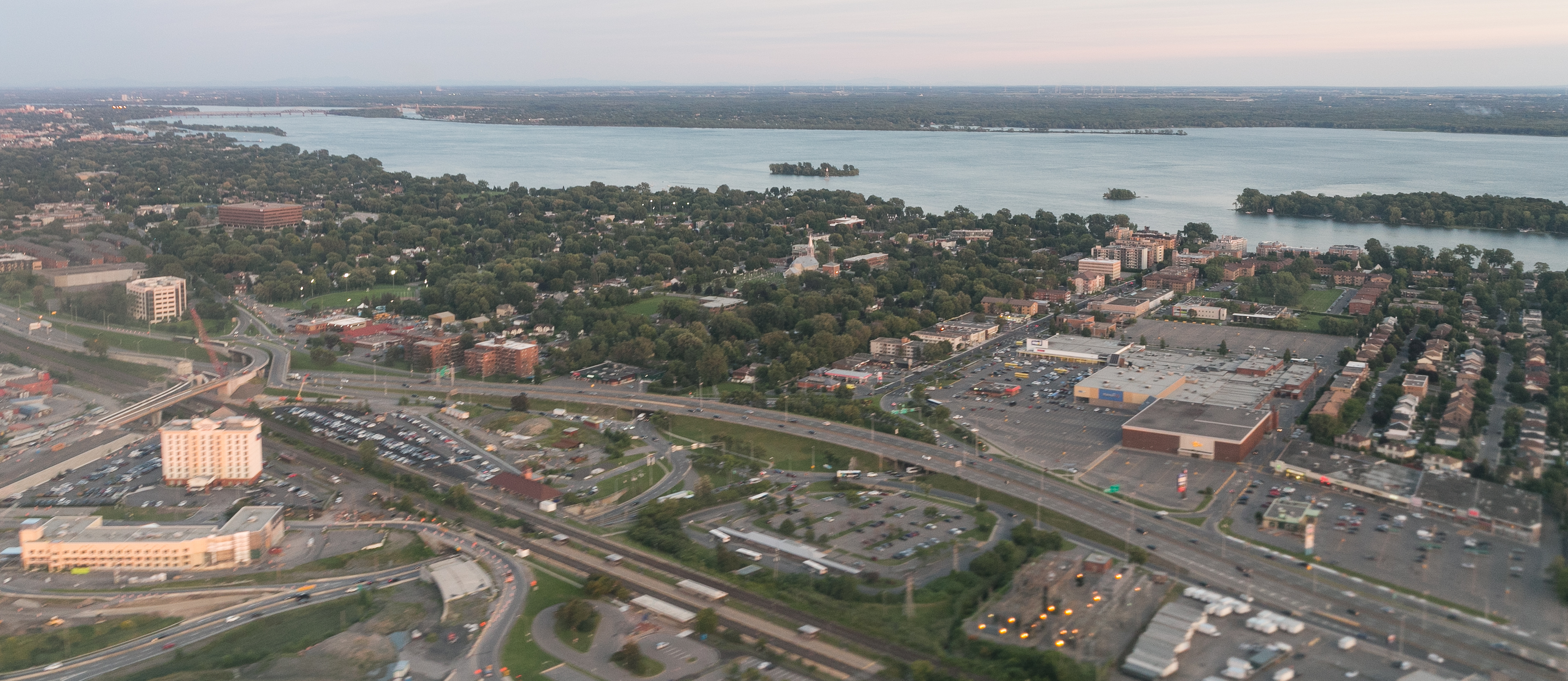
- Aerial view of Dorval

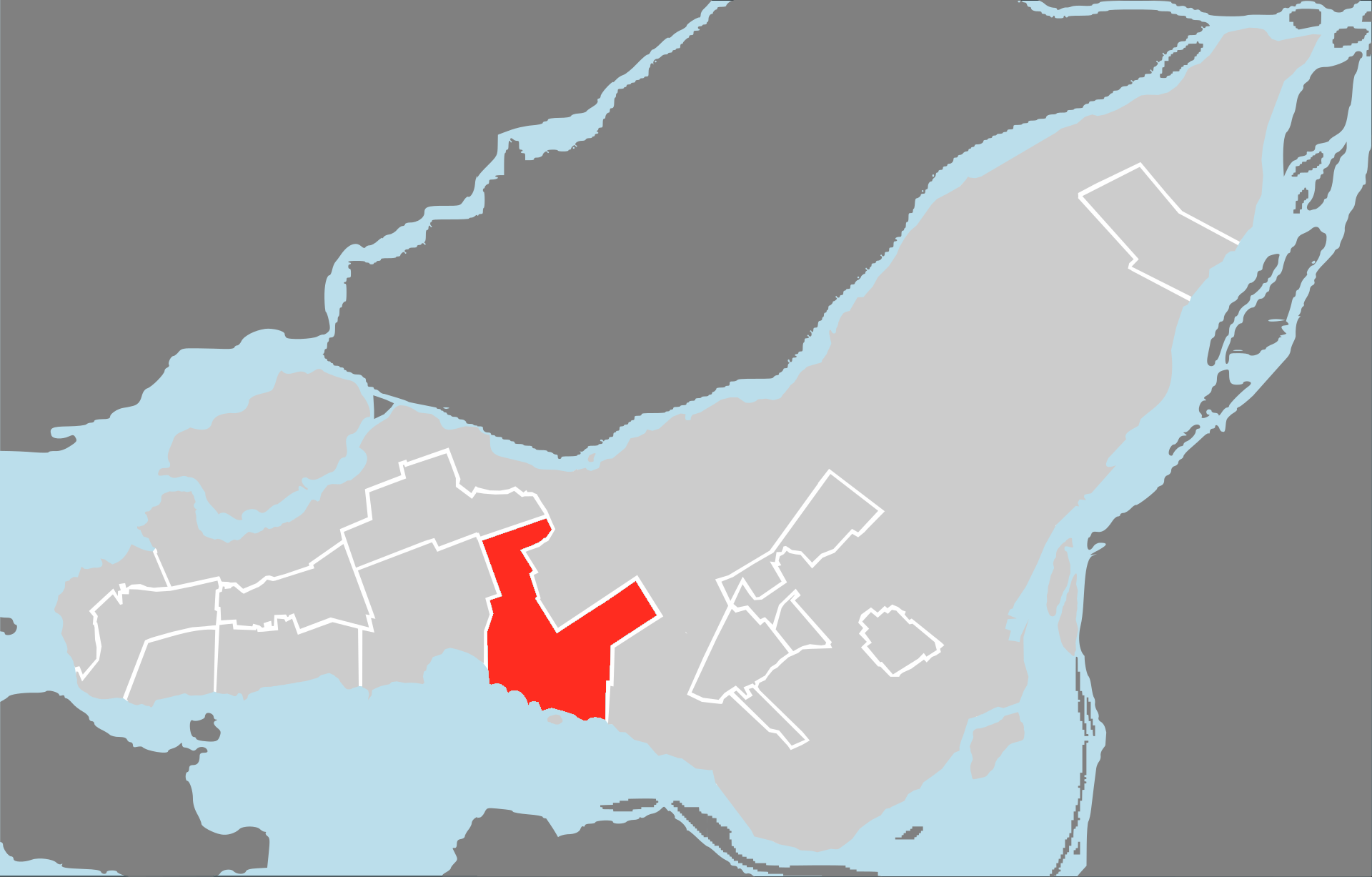
- Location on the Island of Montreal. (Outlined areas indicate demerged municipalities).

- Location in southern Quebec
- Coordinates: 45°27′N 73°45′W
- Country: Canada
- Province: Quebec
- Region: Montréal
- RCM: none
- Settled: 1667
- Founded: 1892
- Town: 1903
- City: 1956
- Merged into Dorval–L'Île-Dorval: 1 January 2002
- Reconstituted: 1 January 2006

Government
  - Mayor: Marc Doret
  - Federal riding: Dorval—Lachine—LaSalle
  - Prov. riding: Marquette

Area
  - Total: 29.08 km^{2} (11.23 sq mi)
  - Land: 20.91 km^{2} (8.07 sq mi)

Population (2021)
  - Total: 19,302
  - Density: 923/km^{2} (2,390/sq mi)
  - Pop 2016-2021: ▲1.7%
  - Dwellings: 9,058
- Time zone: UTC−5 (EST)
  - Summer (DST): UTC−4 (EDT)
- Postal code(s): H4S, H4Y, H9P, H9S
- Area codes: 514 and 438
- Highways A-13 A-20: A-40 (TCH); A-520
- Website: www.ville.dorval.qc.ca

Dorval (/dɔːrˈvæl/; French: [dɔʁval]) is an on-island suburban city on the island of Montreal in southwestern Quebec, Canada. Although the city has the largest surface area in Montreal's west side, it is among the least densely populated. Montréal–Trudeau International Airport constitutes about 60% of the city's land; consequently, all of Dorval's population is concentrated in the southern part of the city.

Dorval is the oldest city in the west side of Montreal, having been founded in 1667, and one of the oldest in Canada and North America.

== History ==
The history of Dorval dates back more than 350 years to 1665 when Sulpician priests established a mission on the outskirts of Ville-Marie, a French settlement which later became known as Montreal. Dorval was originally named Gentilly. It was later renamed La Présentation-de-la-Vierge-Marie. In 1691, the domain of La Présentation, originally owned by Pierre Le Gardeur de Repentigny, was acquired by Jean-Baptiste Bouchard dit d'Orval. "d'Orval" (French for "of Orval") was added to Bouchard's name by his father Claude in reference his birthplace Orval in Montigny-Lengrain, France. It was incorporated as a village in 1892, a town in 1903, and a city in 1956 (in French it was termed a cité, an Old French term from which the English legal term "city" originates).

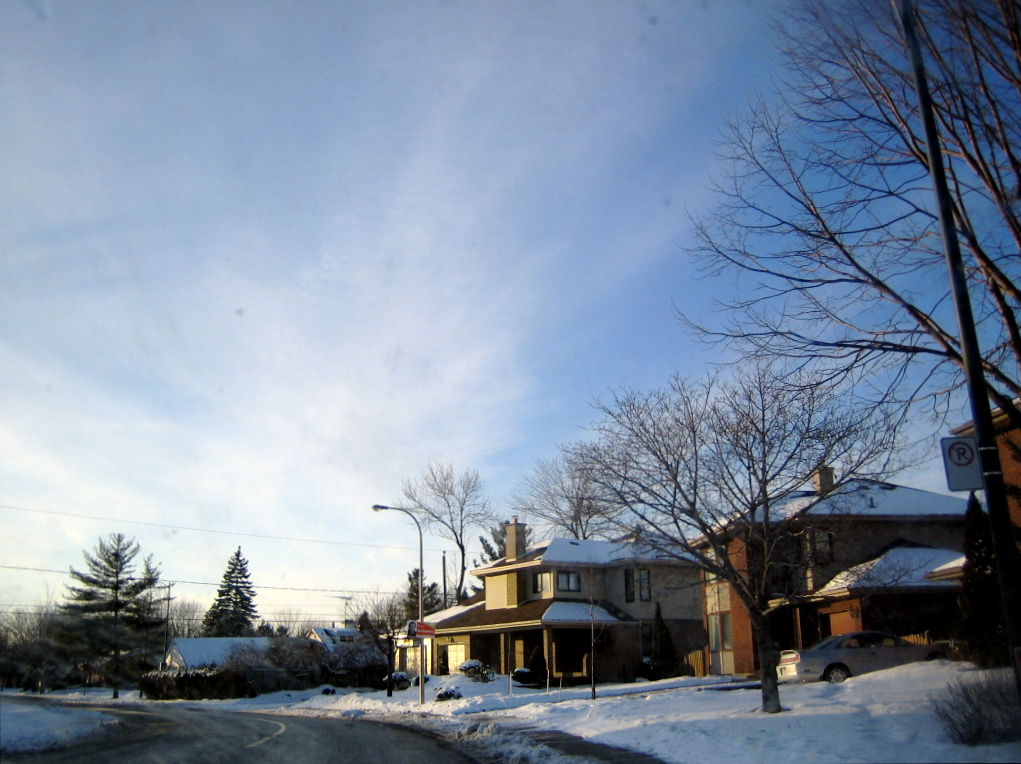
Residential street in Dorval.

As with many other settlements on the island of Montreal, the Grand Trunk Railway, which came to Dorval in 1855, was highly instrumental in attracting many wealthier families, mostly English-speaking, in search of a summer refuge in proximity to their downtown residence and place of work. Access to Dorval from Montreal was also facilitated by the extension of streetcar service to Dorval's eastern city limits in the interwar period.

After the Second World War many middle-class families migrated to Dorval from the city of Montreal and from other parts of Canada. This migration was made possible by the widening of highway 20 and by the large-scale construction of new dwellings. This new housing consisted mostly of single family homes with some townhouses and low-rise apartment buildings, built on lands previously used for agriculture and recreational activities. The post-war period also saw the construction of Dorval Gardens shopping centre in 1954, one of Greater Montreal's first mall-style shopping centres. Today the shopping centre remains the city's principal centre of retail trade.

The island named Dorval Island, settled in 1860 and located less than one kilometre offshore from Dorval, constitutes the separate city of L'Île-Dorval despite being a summer cottage community with only five permanent residents as of the Canada 2011 Census. The island is connected to the city of Dorval by a private ferry service.

On 1 January 2002, as part of the 2002–2006 municipal reorganization of Montreal, Dorval was merged into the city of Montreal, being combined with L'Île-Dorval to form the Dorval–L'Île-Dorval borough of Montreal. After a change of government and a 2004 referendum, Dorval was reconstituted as a city on 1 January 2006. Although Dorval had the legal status of cité prior to the merger, the reconstituted city has the status of ville (see Types of municipalities in Quebec). Nevertheless, the municipal government refers to itself as the "Cité de Dorval".

== Demographics ==
In the 2021 Census of Population conducted by Statistics Canada, Dorval had a population of 19,302 living in 8,716 of its 9,058 total private dwellings, a change of 1.7% from its 2016 population of 18,980. With a land area of 20.91 km^{2} (8.07 sq mi), it had a population density of 923.1/km^{2} (2,390.8/sq mi) in 2021.

Canada census – Dorval community profile

| | 2021 | 2016 |
| Population | 19,302 (+1.7% from 2016) | 18,980 (+4.2% from 2011) |
| Land area | 20.91 km^{2} (8.07 sq mi) | 20.91 km^{2} (8.07 sq mi) |
| Population density | 923/km^{2} (2,390/sq mi) | 907.7/km^{2} (2,351/sq mi) |
| Median age | 45.2 (M: 44.0, F: 46.4) | 44.7 (M: 43.2, F: 46.3) |
| Private dwellings | 9,058 (total) 8,716 (occupied) | 8,818 (total) |
| Median household income | $77,500 | $64,689 |

References: 2021 2016

Historical populations of Dorval

| Year | Pop. | ±% |
|---|---|---|
| 1901 | 481 | — |
| 1911 | 1,005 | +108.9% |
| 1921 | 1,466 | +45.9% |
| 1931 | 2,052 | +40.0% |
| 1941 | 2,048 | −0.2% |
| 1951 | 5,293 | +158.4% |
| 1956 | 14,055 | +165.5% |

| Year | Pop. | ±% |
|---|---|---|
| 1961 | 18,592 | +32.3% |
| 1966 | 20,905 | +12.4% |
| 1971 | 20,469 | −2.1% |
| 1976 | 19,131 | −6.5% |
| 1981 | 17,722 | −7.4% |
| 1986 | 17,354 | −2.1% |
| 1991 | 17,249 | −0.6% |

| Year | Pop. | ±% |
|---|---|---|
| 1996 | 17,572 | +1.9% |
| 2001 | 17,706 | +0.8% |
| 2006 | 18,088 | +2.2% |
| 2011 | 18,208 | +0.7% |
| 2016 | 18,980 | +4.2% |
| 2021 | 19,302 | +1.7% |

Visible Minorities (2021)
| Ethnicity | Population | Percentage (%) |
|---|---|---|
| Not a visible minority | 13,700 | 72% |
| Visible minorities | 5.320 | 28% |

=== Languages ===
According to the Office québécois de la langue française, Dorval has been officially recognized as a bilingual municipality since 2005-11-02.

Home Language (2021)
| Language | Population | Percentage (%) |
|---|---|---|
| English | 10,390 | 54% |
| French | 4,740 | 25% |
| Other | 2,430 | 13% |

Mother Tongue (2021)
| Language | Population | Percentage (%) |
|---|---|---|
| English | 7,890 | 41% |
| French | 5,125 | 27% |
| Other | 4,765 | 25% |

== Economy ==
Air Inuit and La Senza have their headquarters in Dorval. Bombardier Inc. houses the headquarters of its Bombardier Aerospace division in Dorval.

Previously Inter-Canadien had its headquarters in Dorval.

Air Canada Centre, the headquarters of Air Canada, are located on the grounds of Montréal-Pierre Elliott Trudeau International Airport and in Saint-Laurent, Montreal, near Dorval.

== Local government ==
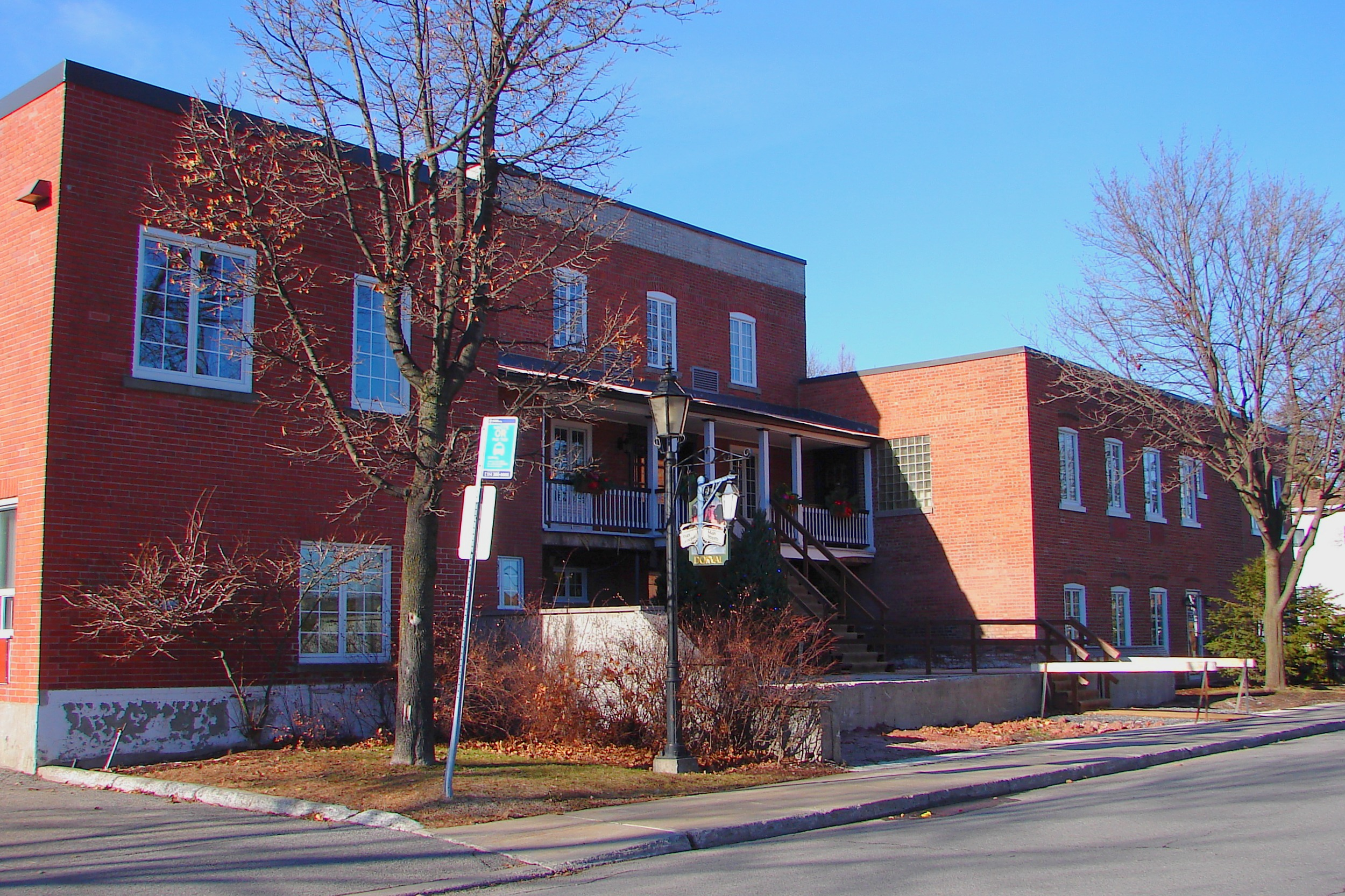
Dorval City Hall

List of former mayors:

- Désiré Girouard (1892–1893)
- James B. Allan (1893–1894)
- Benjamin Décarie (1894–1895)
- Hartland St. Clair MacDougall (1895)
- Charles Décarie (1895–1896)
- Robert FitzGibbon (1896–1897)
- Joseph Dosithée Legault Deslauriés (1897–1899)
- William de Montmolin Marler (1899–1901)
- Jean-Baptiste Meloche (1901–1903)
- Harry Markland Molson (1903–1905)
- Amable Lallemand (1905–1907)
- Anthony Haig Sims (1907–1909)
- Benjamin Décarie (1909–1911)
- William A. C. Hamilton (1911–1913)
- Joseph Leroux (1913–1915)
- Charles-C. Décarie (1915–1923)
- Harvey Thompson (1923–1925)
- Avila Décarie (1925–1927)
- E.-Raphaël Chadillon (1927–1933)
- Arthur Cecil Comber (1933–1937, 1941–1943)
- J. Arthur Lajoie (1937–1939)
- Ernest H. Décarie (1939–1941)
- Joseph Ovila Adrien Valois (1943–1947)
- Stanley Mason Elliott (1947–1948)
- Ovila Cardinal (1948–1955)
- Robert John Pratt (1955–1964)
- Sarto Desnoyers (1964–1982)
- Peter Blyth Yeomans (1982–2002)
- Edgar Rouleau (2002–2021)
- Marc Doret (2021–present)

== Infrastructure ==
Aéroports de Montréal, the Greater Montreal airport authority, has its headquarters in Leigh-Capreol Place (French: place Leigh-Capreol) in Dorval.

=== Trudeau Airport ===
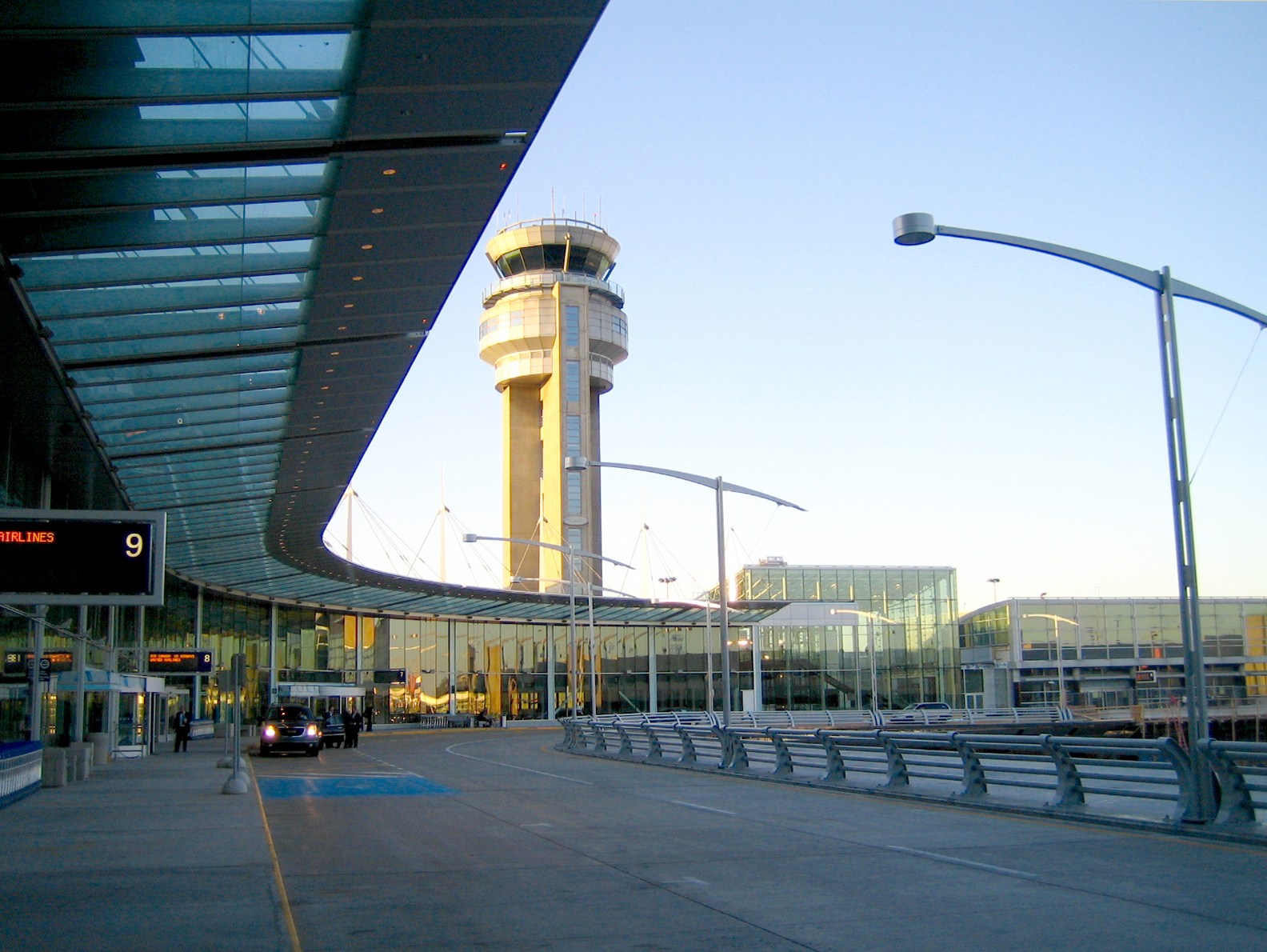
Montréal-Pierre Elliott Trudeau International Airport

Most of Montreal's principal airport, Pierre Elliott Trudeau International Airport (previously known as Dorval Airport), is in Dorval. Originally a military airfield used mainly to refuel new fighters and bombers being flown to Great Britain during the Second World War, Trudeau Airport today serves over 18 million passengers annually.

== Education ==
The Centre de services scolaire Marguerite-Bourgeoys (CSSMB) operates Francophone public schools, but were previously operated by the Commission scolaire Marguerite-Bourgeoys (CSMB) until 15 June 2020.

Until 1998 it was under religious school boards. The change was a result of a law passed by the Quebec government that changed the school board system from denominational to linguistic.

Schools include:

- Centre d'éducation des adultes Jeanne-Sauvé (adult school)
- École secondaire Dorval-Jean-XXIII (high school)
- École primaire Gentilly (elementary school)

The Lester B. Pearson School Board (LBPSB) operates Anglophone public schools.

- Dorval Elementary School, formerly known as Courtland Park Elementary School until 2006.

Kativik Ilisarniliriniq (also known as the Kativik School Board in English) formerly operated the Kativik Senior Education Centre in Dorval. In the district's early history, senior high school students had to attend classes there to get a high school diploma. During its history, most students dropped out of the program rather than completing it; the centre was a long distance from Nunavik, where the students came from.

== Notable residents ==
- Jason Demers (born 1988), NHL ice hockey player

== See also ==
- Dorval bus terminus
- Dorval intercity station
- Dorval station
- List of anglophone communities in Quebec
- List of former boroughs
- Montreal Merger
- Municipal reorganization in Quebec
