= Claude Dauphin (politician) =

Canadian politician

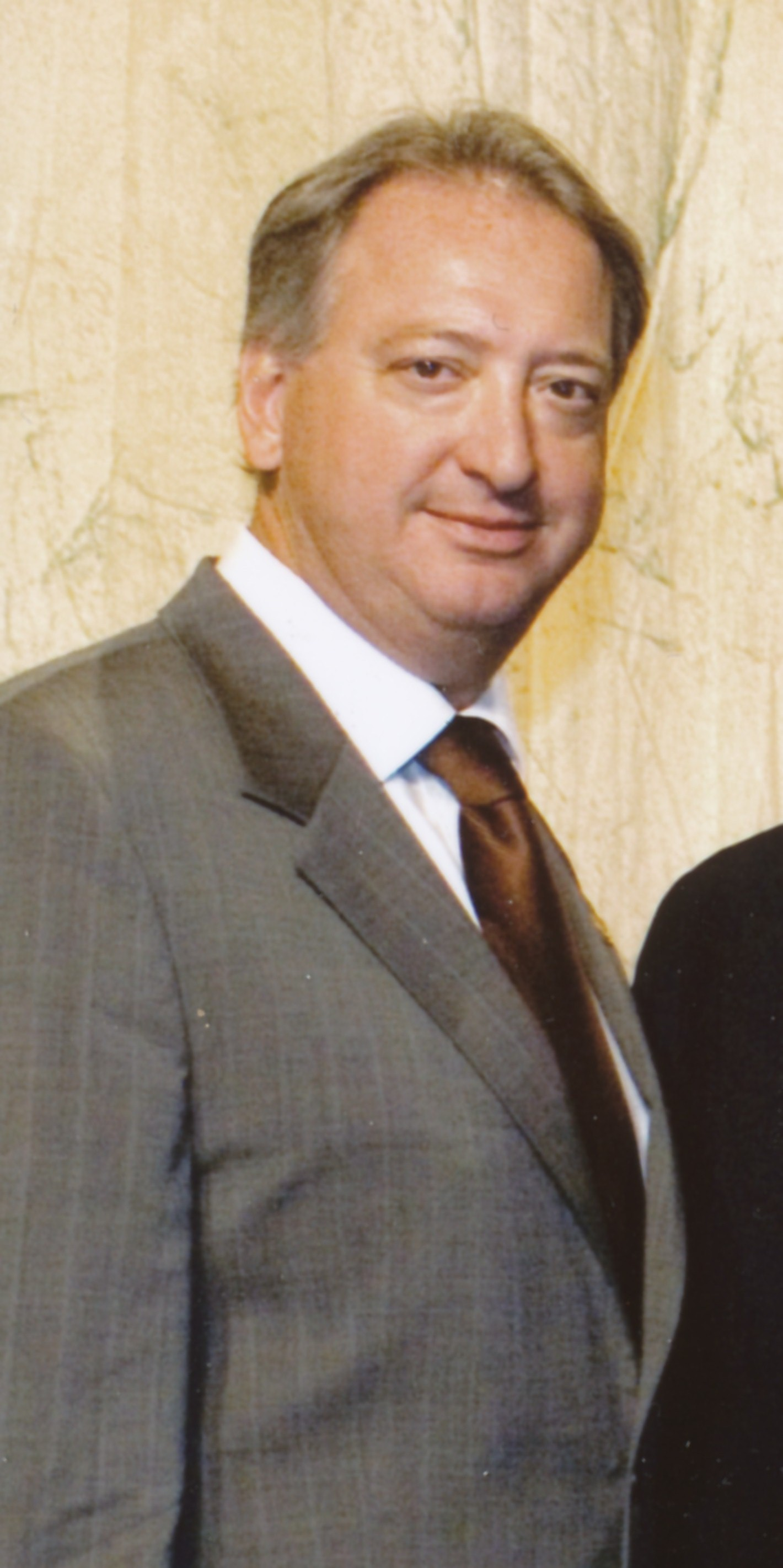

Borough mayor for Lachine and Montreal City Councillor
- In office 1 January 2005 – 16 November 2017
- Succeeded by: Maja Vodanovic

Chairman of the City of Montreal Executive Committee
- In office 2008–2009
- Preceded by: Frank Zampino
- Succeeded by: Gérald Tremblay

MNA for Marquette
- In office 1981–1994
- Preceded by: First member
- Succeeded by: François Ouimet

Personal details
- Born: 17 December 1953 (age 72)
- Party: Quebec Liberal Party (provincial); Union Montréal (2001-2013); Équipe Dauphin Lachine (2013-)
- Occupation: Lawyer

Claude Dauphin (born 17 December 1953, in Lachine, Quebec) is a lawyer and politician in the province of Quebec, Canada. He was a Montreal city councillor and also served as the mayor of the Montreal borough of Lachine. He was also elected to the National Assembly of Quebec for the riding of Marquette in the Montreal region from 1981 to 1994 as a member of the Quebec Liberal Party.

== Background ==
Dauphin went to Université Laval and obtained a bachelor's degree in law and also attended the University of British Columbia before being admitted to the Barreau du Quebec. He was active as a lawyer from 1979 to 1981.

== Member of the Provincial Legislature ==
Dauphin entered provincial politics in the 1981 election. He was elected in Marquette and re-elected for two other terms in 1985 and 1989. He was not part of the Robert Bourassa or Daniel Johnson Jr. cabinets from 1985 to 1994 but was named Parliamentary Secretary to the Minister of Public Security and the Justice Minister. He did not seek a fourth term in the 1994 elections when the Liberal lost to the Parti Québécois. He was succeeded in Marquette by François Ouimet. He later worked in the office of former Canadian Federal Finance Minister Paul Martin.

== Montreal City Politics ==
Dauphin is a past president of the Montreal Transit Corporation.

Dauphin was elected mayor of the Montreal borough of Lachine in the 2005 municipal elections. He was also a councillor for Lachine between 2002 and 2005.

He sat on the Executive Committee of the Montreal municipal council with the rank of vice-president and responsibility for public security. In 2008, he was named by Mayor Gérald Tremblay, as the Chairperson of the City of Montreal's Executive Committee, replacing Frank Zampino.

Dauphin was speaker of the Montreal City Council until April 2011 when he stepped down.

Dauphin was elected president of the Federation of Canadian Municipalities in June 2013.

In July 2013, Claude Dauphin launched his own borough-level political party for the November 2013 election, the Équipe Dauphin Lachine party.
