= Marquette (provincial electoral district) =

Provincial electoral district in Quebec, Canada

Coordinates: 45°27′N 73°42′W

Quebec electoral district
- Location in Montreal

Provincial electoral district
- Legislature: National Assembly of Quebec
MNA
Enrico Ciccone
Liberal
- District created: 1980
- First contested: 1981
- Last contested: 2026

Demographics
- Population (2006): 68,697
- Electors (2014): 46,167
- Area (km²): 51.8
- Pop. density (per km²): 1,326.2
- Census division: Montreal (part)
- Census subdivision(s): Montreal (part), Dorval, L'Île-Dorval

Marquette (French pronunciation: [maʁkɛt]) is a provincial electoral district in the Montreal region of Quebec, Canada, that elects members to the National Assembly of Quebec. It comprises the cities of Dorval, L'Île-Dorval, and the Lachine borough of Montreal.

It was created for the 1981 election from parts of Jacques-Cartier, Marguerite-Bourgeoys and Notre-Dame-de-Grâce electoral districts.

In the change from the 2001 to the 2011 electoral map, it lost the part of LaSalle borough that it formerly had to Marguerite-Bourgeoys electoral district.

== Members of the National Assembly ==
Legislature	Years	Member	Party
Riding created from Jacques-Cartier, Marguerite-Bourgeoys and Notre-Dame-de-Grâce
32nd	1981–1985	Claude Dauphin	Liberal
33rd	1985–1989	Claude Dauphin	Liberal
34th	1989–1994	Claude Dauphin	Liberal
35th	1994–1998	François Ouimet	Liberal
36th	1998–2003	François Ouimet	Liberal
37th	2003–2007	François Ouimet	Liberal
38th	2007–2008	François Ouimet	Liberal
39th	2008–2012	François Ouimet	Liberal
40th	2012–2014	François Ouimet	Liberal
41st	2014–2018	François Ouimet	Liberal
42nd	2018–2022	Enrico Ciccone	Liberal
43rd	2022–2026	Enrico Ciccone	Liberal
44th	2026–Present	Enrico Ciccone	Liberal

== Election results ==
2026 Quebec general election
** Preliminary results — Not yet official **
Party	Candidate	Votes	%	±%
Liberal	Enrico Ciccone	14,498	55.29	
Parti Québécois	Guillaume de Palma-Demers	3,847	14.67	
Québec solidaire	Pascal Malo	2,776	10.59	
Conservative	Richard Zilversmit	2,703	10.31	
Coalition Avenir Québec	Mahsa Barani	1,761	6.72	
Green	Rachid Jemmah	327	1.25	
Canadian	Alexandre Pendenza	308	1.17	
Total valid votes				
Total rejected ballots				
Turnout			58.26	
Electors on the lists				
Electors on the lists			–	–
Source: Élections Québec

2022 Quebec general election
Party	Candidate	Votes	%	±%
Liberal	Enrico Ciccone	12,255	46.73	+3.74
Coalition Avenir Québec	Marc Baaklini	5,722	21.82	-6.52
Québec solidaire	Jérémy Côté	2,956	11.27	-0.20
Conservative	Sam Nassr	2,395	9.13	+6.95
Parti Québécois	Stéphane Richard	2,114	8.06	+0.28
Green	Shameem Jauffur	682	2.60	-1.44
Independent	Félix Vincent Ardea	100	0.38	–
Total valid votes		26,224	98.89	
Total rejected ballots		294	1.11	
Turnout		26,518	58.32	-1.29
Electors on the lists		45,472		

2018 Quebec general election
Party	Candidate	Votes	%	±%
Liberal	Enrico Ciccone	11,819	42.99	-19.52
Coalition Avenir Québec	Marc Hétu	7,793	28.34	+14.95
Québec solidaire	Anick Perreault	3,153	11.47	+5.59
Parti Québécois	Carole Vincent	2,139	7.78	-6.74
Green	Kimberly Salt	1,111	4.04	+1.95
Conservative	Olivia Boye	599	2.18	+1.58
New Democratic	John Symon	596	2.17	–
Citoyens au pouvoir	Patrick Desjardins	150	0.55	–
Independent	Roger Déry	134	0.49	–
Total valid votes		27,494	98.69	
Total rejected ballots		366	1.31	
Turnout		27,860	59.61	-11.54
Eligible voters		46,740		
Liberal hold		Swing		-17.24
Source(s) "Rapport des résultats officiels du scrutin". Élections Québec.

2014 Quebec general election
Party	Candidate	Votes	%	±%
Liberal	François Ouimet	20,342	62.51	+13.31
Parti Québécois	Élisabeth Fortin	4,724	14.52	-7.31
Coalition Avenir Québec	Marc Thériault	4,358	13.39	-6.37
Québec solidaire	Marie-France Raymond-Dufour	1,915	5.88	+2.21
Green	John Symon	679	2.09	-1.09
Conservative	Pierre Ennio Crespi	195	0.60	–
Parti nul	Thierry Bisaillon-Roy	178	0.55	–
Option nationale	Maude Paquette	151	0.46	-0.95
Total valid votes		32,542	99.06	–
Total rejected ballots		308	0.94	–
Turnout		32,850	71.15	+0.76
Electors on the lists		46,167	–	–

2012 Quebec general election
Party	Candidate	Votes	%	±%
Liberal	François Ouimet	15,343	49.20	-7.01
Parti Québécois	Étienne Gougoux	6,683	21.83	-5.09
Coalition Avenir Québec	Victor Tan	6,101	19.56	+10.96
Québec solidaire	Claudelle Cyr	1,232	3.67	+1.19
Green	John Symon	992	3.18	-2.28
Option nationale	Patrick Valois	440	1.41	–
Total valid votes		31,187	98.88	–
Total rejected ballots		354	1.12	–
Turnout		31,541	70.39	+21.30
Electors on the lists		44,812	–	–

* Result compared to Action démocratique

2008 Quebec general election
Party	Candidate	Votes	%	±%
Liberal	François Ouimet	13,471	56.21	+11.44
Parti Québécois	Catherine Major	6,451	26.92	+6.37
Action démocratique	Marc-Antoine Desjardins	2,062	8.60	-11.99
Green	Réjean Malette	1,308	5.46	-1.91
Québec solidaire	Maneul Teigeiro	588	2.45	-0.57
Marxist–Leninist	Yves Le Seigle	86	0.36	–
Total valid votes		23,966	98.53	
Total rejected ballots		358	1.47	
Turnout		24,324	49.09	-15.28
Electors on the lists		49,551		

2007 Quebec general election
Party	Candidate	Votes	%	±%
Liberal	François Ouimet	14,985	47.77	-17.29
Action démocratique	Mark Yerbury	6,460	20.59	+10.60
Parti Québécois	Daniel Hurteau	6,448	20.55	-2.96
Green	Réjean Malette	2,313	7.37	–
Québec solidaire	Johanne Létourneau	946	3.02	–
Independent	Russell Wood	220	0.70	–
Total valid votes		31,372	99.03	
Total rejected ballots		306	0.97	
Turnout		31,678	64.37	-1.74
Electors on the lists		49,216		

2003 Quebec general election
Party	Candidate	Votes	%	±%
Liberal	François Ouimet	21,232	65.06	+8.61
Parti Québécois	Yves Beauregard	7,672	23.51	-9.67
Action démocratique	Diane Décoste	3,260	9.99	+1.10
Equality	Bruce Hulley	289	0.89	-0.01
Marxist–Leninist	Garnet Colly	179	0.55	-0.04

1998 Quebec general election
Party	Candidate	Votes	%	±%
Liberal	François Ouimet	16,606	56.45	+1.39
Parti Québécois	Yannick Proulx	9,761	33.18	-3.08
Action démocratique	François Lizotte	2,615	8.89	+4.13
Equality	Kashmir Singh Randhawa	264	0.90	-0.09
Marxist–Leninist	Louise Dubois	173	0.59	-0.09

1995 Quebec referendum
Side	Votes	%
Non	21,729	61.46
Oui	13,628	38.54

== See also ==
- List of Quebec provincial electoral districts
- Canadian provincial electoral districts
