= Centre de services scolaire Marguerite-Bourgeoys =

Canadian school board

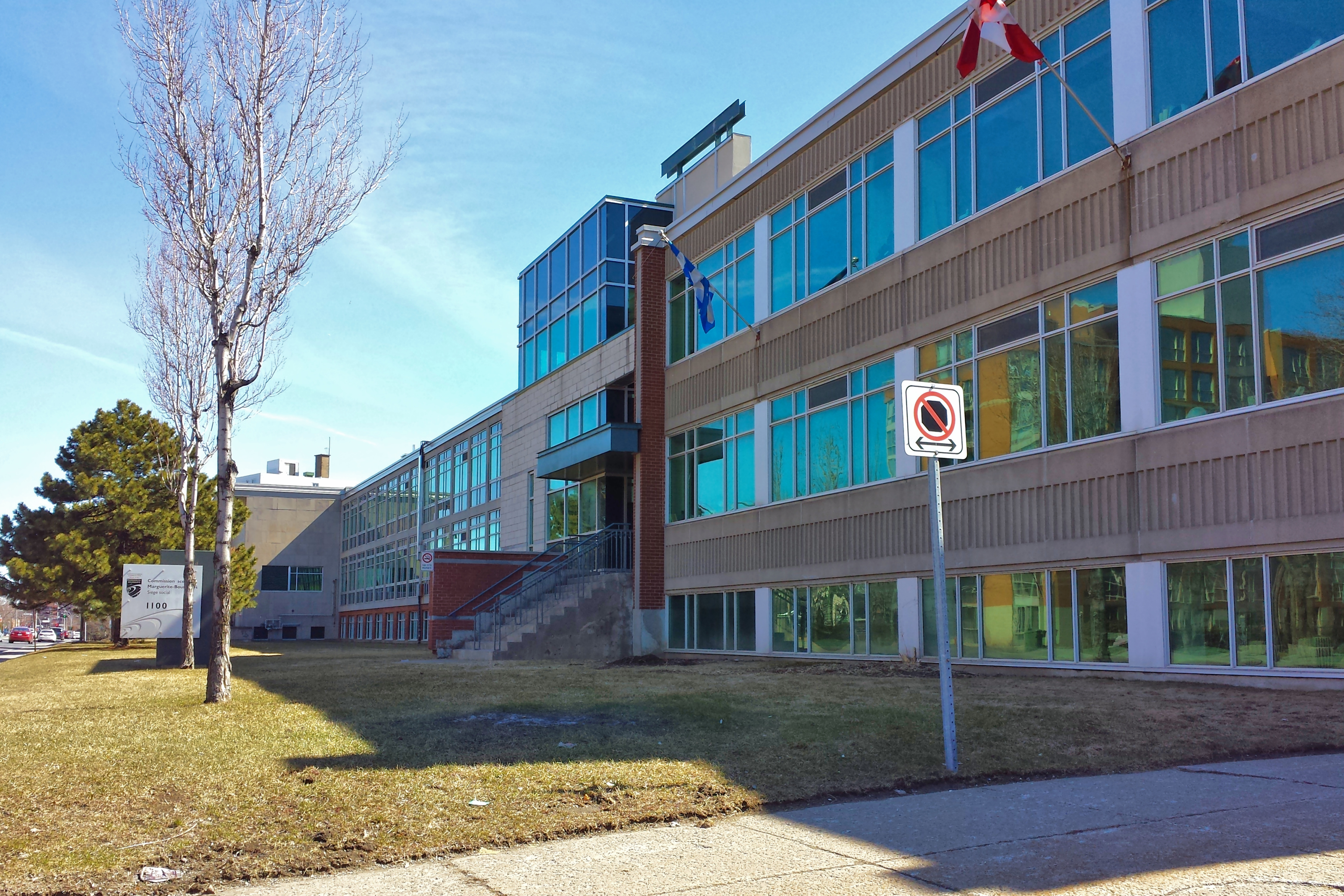
Head office of CSSMB along Côte-Vertu Boulevard in Saint-Laurent (in the picture it was functioning as the Commission scolaire Marguerite-Bourgeoys headquarters)

The Centre de services scolaire Marguerite-Bourgeoys (CSSMB) is an autonomous school service centre on Montreal Island, Quebec, Canada, appointed by the Ministry of Education.

Its headquarters is in the Saint-Laurent borough of Montreal. Its education centre is in LaSalle, also in Montreal.

== History ==
The centre is named after Marguerite Bourgeoys (1620–1700), a French nun who helped start education infrastructure in the new colony.

On June 15, 2020, Centre de services scolaire Marguerite-Bourgeoys replaced the former elected Commission scolaire Marguerite-Bourgeoys, which was created on July 1, 1998, as a result of a law passed by the Quebec government that changed the school board system from denominational to linguistic.

== Schools ==
=== Primary schools ===
==== District sud-ouest ====
- École primaire Beaconsfield (Beaconsfield)
- École primaire Catherine-Soumillard (Lachine)
- École primaire des Berges-de-Lachine (Lachine)
- École primaire du Bout-de-l'Isle (Sainte-Anne-de-Bellevue)
- École primaire Émile-Nelligan (Kirkland)
- École primaire Gentilly (Dorval)
- École primaire Jardin-des-Saints-Anges (Lachine)
- John-F.-Kennedy
- École primaire Joseph-Henrico (Baie-D'Urfé)
- École primaire Marguerite-Bourgeoys (Pointe-Claire)
- École primaire Martin-Bélanger (Lachine)
- École primaire Paul-Jarry (Lachine)
- École primaire Philippe-Morin (Lachine)
- École primaire Pointe-Claire (Pointe-Claire)
- École primaire Saint-Louis (Pointe-Claire)
- École primaire Saint-Rémi (Beaconsfield)
- École primaire Très-Saint-Sacrement (Lachine)
- École primaire Victor-Thérien (Lachine)

==== District nord-ouest ====
- École primaire de l'Odyssée (Pierrefonds-Roxboro)
- École primaire Dollard-Des Ormeaux (Dollard-Des Ormeaux)
- École primaire du Bois-de-Liesse (Dollard-Des Ormeaux)
- École primaire du Grand-Chêne (Pierrefonds-Roxboro)
- École primaire Harfang-des-Neiges (Pierrefonds-Roxboro)
- École primaire Jacques-Bizard (L'Île-Bizard–Sainte-Geneviève)
- École primaire Jonathan-Wilson (L'Île-Bizard–Sainte-Geneviève)
- École primaire Lalande (Pierrefonds-Roxboro)
- École primaire Murielle-Dumont (Pierrefonds-Roxboro)
- École primaire Perce-Neige (Pierrefonds-Roxboro)
- École primaire Sainte-Geneviève (Ouest) (L'Île-Bizard–Sainte-Geneviève)
- École primaire Saint-Gérard (Pierrefonds-Roxboro)
- École primaire Saint-Luc (Dollard-des-Ormeaux)

==== District sud-est ====
- École primaire Chanoine-Joseph-Théorêt (Verdun)
- des Coquelicots
- École primaire des Découvreurs (LaSalle)
- École primaire des Saules-Rieurs (Verdun)
- École primaire du Grand-Héron (LaSalle)
- École primaire du Petit-Collège (LaSalle)
- École primaire Henri-Forest (Lasalle)
- École primaire Laurendeau-Dunton (LaSalle)
- École primaire L'Eau-Vive (LaSalle)
- École primaire Lévis-Sauvé (Verdun)
- École primaire Notre-Dame-de-la-Garde (Verdun)
- École primaire Notre-Dame-de-la-Paix (Verdun)
- École primaire Notre-Dame-de-Lourdes (Verdun)
- École primaire Notre-Dame-des-Rapides (Lasalle)
- École primaire Notre-Dame-des-Sept-Douleurs (Verdun)
- École primaire de l'Orée-du-Parc (LaSalle)
- École primaire Pierre-Rémy (LaSalle)
- École primaire Sainte-Catherine-Labouré (LaSalle)
- École primaire Sainte-Geneviève (Sud) (LaSalle)
- École primaire Terre-des-Jeunes (LaSalle)

==== District est ====
- École primaire Académie Saint-Clément (Mont-Royal)
- École primaire de la Mosaïque (Côte-Saint-Luc)
- École primaire des Amis-du-Monde (Côte-Saint-Luc)
- École primaires des Marguerite (Verdun)
- École primaire Guy-Drummond (Outremont)
- École primaire Île-des-Soeurs (Verdun)
- École primaire Lajoie (Outremont)
- École primaire Nouvelle-Querbes (Outremont)
- École primaire Saint-Clément-Est (Mont-Royal)
- École primaire Saint-Clément-Ouest (Mont-Royal)
- École primaire Saint-Germain-d'Outremont (Outremont)

==== District nord-est ====
- École primaire au Trésor-du-Boisé
- École primaire Beau-Séjour (Saint-Laurent)
- École primaire Bois-Franc-Aquarelle (Saint-Laurent)
- École primaire Cardinal-Léger (Saint-Laurent)
- École primaire des Grands-Êtres (Saint-Laurent)
- École primaire Édouard-Laurin (Saint-Laurent)
- École primaire Enfants-du-Monde (Saint-Laurent)
- École primaire Enfant-Soleil (Saint-Laurent)
- École primaire Hébert
- École primaire Henri-Beaulieu (Saint-Laurent)
- École primaire Jean-Grou (Saint-Laurent)
- École primaire Jonathan (Saint-Laurent)
- École primaire Katimavik (Saint-Laurent)
- École primaire Laurentide (Saint-Laurent)

=== Secondary schools ===
- Collège Saint-Louis (Lachine)
- École secondaire Dalbé-Viau (Lachine)
- École secondaire des Sources (Dollard-des-Ormeaux)
- École secondaire Dorval-Jean-XXIII (Dorval)
- École secondaire Félix-Leclerc (Pointe-Claire)
- École secondaire Paul-Gérin-Lajoie-d'Outremont (Outremont)

DISTRICT SUD-OUEST

- Collège Saint-Louis
- Dalbé-Viau
- Dorval-Jean-XXIII
- Félix-Leclerc
- John-F.-Kennedy

DISTRICT NORD-OUEST

- des Sources
- de l'Altitude
- École secondaire Saint-Georges (Senneville)

DISTRICT SUD-EST

- École secondaire Cavelier-De LaSalle (LaSalle)
- de la Traversée
- École secondaire Monseigneur-Richard (Verdun)

DISTRICT EST

- École secondaire Mont-Royal (Mont-Royal)
- École secondaire Paul-Gérin-Lajoie-d'Outremont (Outremont, Québec)

DISTRICT NORD-EST

- du Sas (secondaire adapté à ta situation)
- École secondaire Pierre-Laporte (Mont-Royal)
- Rose-Virginie-Pelletier
- École secondaire Saint-Laurent (Saint-Laurent)

=== Specialized schools ===
- Le secondaire adapté à ta situation (SAS) (Outremont)
- École primaire et secondaire John-F.-Kennedy (Beaconsfield)
- École Rose-Virginie-Pelletier (RVP) (Pierrefonds-Roxboro)
- de la Traversée

=== Professional development centres ===
- Centre de formation professionnelle Léonard-De Vinci (Saint-Laurent)
- Centre de formation professionnelle des métiers de la santé (Kirkland)
- Centre intégré de mécanique, de métallurgie et d'électricité (CIMME) (LaSalle)
- Centre de formation professionnelle de Verdun
- Centre de formation professionnelle des métiers de la santé
- Centre de formation professionnelle des carrefours
- Centre de formation professionnelle de Lachine

=== Adult education centres ===
- Centre d'éducation des adultes Champlain (Verdun)
- Centre d'éducation des adultes de LaSalle (Lachine and LaSalle)
- Centre d'éducation des adultes Outremont (Outremont)
- Centre d'éducation des adultes Jeanne-Sauvé
