= Anju Dhillon =

Canadian politician (born 1979)

Anju Dhillon MP

Parliamentary Secretary to the Minister of Status of Women
- In office December 2, 2015 – January 27, 2017
- Minister: Patty Hajdu; Maryam Monsef
- Preceded by: Susan Truppe
- Succeeded by: Terry Duguid

Member of Parliament for Dorval—Lachine—LaSalle
- Incumbent
- Assumed office October 19, 2015
- Preceded by: district created

Personal details
- Born: Montreal, Quebec, Canada
- Party: Liberal
- Education: Concordia University; Université de Montréal
- Profession: Attorney

Anju Dhillon (born 1979) MP is a Canadian Liberal politician, who was elected to represent the riding of Dorval—Lachine—LaSalle in the House of Commons of Canada in the 2015 federal election. She is the first person of South Asian descent to be elected from the province of Quebec.

Dhillon was born and raised in Montreal, and began volunteering for Paul Martin's campaigns at age 13. For ten years she was vice-president (female) for youth of the federal liberal riding association in LaSalle-Émard, and was subsequently its vice-president (female). Dhillon attended Concordia University, earning a Bachelor of Arts in political science. She then studied law at Université de Montréal and became the first Canadian Sikh to practice law in Quebec.

== Electoral record ==
2025 Canadian federal election: Dorval—Lachine—LaSalle
Party	Candidate	Votes	%	±%	Expenditures
Liberal	Anju Dhillon	29,927	59.36	+7.12	$51,586.43
Conservative	Alioune Sarr	10,428	20.68	+8.76	$30,005.34
Bloc Québécois	Pauline Fleur Julie Postel	6,338	12.57	–3.15	$3,221.59
New Democratic	Angélique Soleil Lavoie	2,104	4.17	–8.93	$549.38
Green	Amir Badr Eldeen	823	1.63	–1.20	$0.00
People's	Michael Patterson	478	0.95	–3.24	$6,926.93
Rhinoceros	André Lavigne	251	0.50	N/A	$0.00
No affiliation	Katy Le Rougetel	071	0.14	N/A	$468.98
Total valid votes		50,420	98.79	+0.41	$128,055.50
Total rejected ballots		616	1.21	-0.41	
Turnout		51,036	63.42	+4.06	
Eligible voters		80,468			
Liberal notional hold		Swing		-0.82	
Source: Elections Canada

2021 Canadian federal election: Dorval—Lachine—LaSalle
Party	Candidate	Votes	%	±%	Expenditures
Liberal	Anju Dhillon	25,233	52.4	-0.5	$41,637.33
Bloc Québécois	Cloé Rose Jenneau	7,542	15.7	-1.4	$2,391.48
New Democratic	Fabiola Ngamaleu Teumeni	6,241	13.0	+1.2	$12,672.76
Conservative	Jude Bazelais	5,754	12.0	+1.5	$32,437.42
People's	Michael Patterson	2,020	4.2	+3.2	$4,155.65
Green	Laura Mariani	1,351	2.8	-2.7	$11.20
Total valid votes/expense limit		48,141	98.4	–	$112,667.14
Total rejected ballots		786	1.6		
Turnout		48,927	59.2		
Registered voters		82,663			
Liberal hold		Swing		+0.5	
Source: Elections Canada

2019 Canadian federal election: Dorval—Lachine—LaSalle
Party	Candidate	Votes	%	±%	Expenditures
Liberal	Anju Dhillon	27,821	52.9	-1.99	$54,013.89
Bloc Québécois	Jean-Frédéric Vaudry	8,974	17.1	+7.32	none listed
New Democratic	Lori Morrison	6,207	11.8	-9.75	$1,872.86
Conservative	Céline Laquerre	5,543	10.5	-0.58	none listed
Green	Réjean Malette	2,898	5.5	+3.22	none listed
People's	Arash Torbati	528	1.0	–	$0.00
Progressive Canadian	Fang Hu	426	0.8	–	$0.00
Rhinoceros	Xavier Watso	177	0.3	–	$0.00
Total valid votes/expense limit		52,574	100.0		
Total rejected ballots		788			
Turnout		53,362	62.5		
Eligible voters		85,344			
Liberal hold		Swing		-4.66	
Source: Elections Canada

2015 Canadian federal election: Dorval—Lachine—LaSalle
Party	Candidate	Votes	%	±%	Expenditures
Liberal	Anju Dhillon	29,974	54.89	+25.49	$97,977.49
New Democratic	Isabelle Morin	11,769	21.55	-19.57	$52,909.84
Conservative	Daniela Chivu	6,049	11.08	-3.07	$25,233.35
Bloc Québécois	Jean-Frédéric Vaudry	5,338	9.78	-1.76	–
Green	Vincent J. Carbonneau	1,245	2.28	-0.72	–
Independent	Soulèye Ndiaye	230	0.42	–	$3,623.98
Total valid votes/Expense limit		54,605	100.0		$224,217.32
Total rejected ballots		593	–	–	
Turnout		55,198	–	–	
Eligible voters		85,587			
Source: Elections Canada
