= Dorval–L'Île-Dorval =

Former borough in West Island, Montreal, Canada

Coordinates: 45°26′19.9″N 73°43′48.7″W

Dorval–L'Île-Dorval (French pronunciation: [dɔʁval lil dɔʁval]) was a former borough in the West Island area of Montreal, Quebec. It was composed of the former municipalities of Dorval and L'Île-Dorval.

The municipalities were merged into the city of Montreal by the provincial government on January 1, 2002. On June 20, 2004, both Dorval and L'Île-Dorval voted to return to being independent municipalities. This took effect January 1, 2006, dissolving the borough.

== Transportation ==
Dorval Island is accessible by a semi-private ferry operating from May to October, available only to residents and their guests. The island is vehicle-free except for a pickup truck used for garbage collection.

== See also ==
- List of former boroughs
- Montreal Merger
- Municipal reorganization in Quebec
