= École Secondaire Saint-Laurent =

Location
- 1870, rue Decelles; Saint-Laurent, Quebec, H4M 1A8; Canada
- Coordinates: 45.5089156°N 73.6864559°W

Information
- School type: Public
- School board: Commission Scolaire Marguerite-Bourgeoys (CSMB)
- Principal: Mr. René Bernier
- Grades: 7–11
- Language: French
- Area: Montreal
- Website: ecolesaintlaurent.ca
- Last updated: November 9, 2021

École Secondaire Saint-Laurent is a public Francophone and mixed secondary school located in the Saint-Laurent borough in Montreal.
