= Deck Dorval =

Deck Dorval is a pseudonym used by three Belgian authors collaborating on detective novels written in Esperanto. The authors included Frans van Dooren, Jef Beeckmans, and Jos Deckkers.

In their writing partnership, Van Dooren wrote, Jos Deckkers criticized and Jef Beeckmans corrected grammar and language. Their forty-year friendship was based on their mutual interests in Esperanto, philosophy, and literature.

After the deaths of Beeckmans (1975) and Deckkers (1979), their heirs gave van Dooren the right to finish works that the group had already been begun.

According to the Concise Encyclopedia of the Original Literature of Esperanto, four of Deck Dorval's novels were "reworked" by Christian René Arthur Declerk.

== Works ==
- Jahto veturas for ... kaj veturigas la morton
