= Dorval—Lachine—LaSalle =

Federal electoral district in Quebec, Canada

Coordinates: 45°26′30″N 73°41′00″W

Quebec electoral district
- Interactive map of riding boundaries from the 2025 federal election

Federal electoral district
- Legislature: House of Commons
MP
Anju Dhillon
Liberal
- District created: 2013
- First contested: 2015
- Last contested: 2021
- District webpage: profile, map

Demographics
- Population (2016): 112,886
- Electors (2019): 85,344
- Area (km²): 51
- Pop. density (per km²): 2,213.5
- Census division: Montreal (part)
- Census subdivision(s): Montreal (part), Dorval, L'Île-Dorval

Dorval—Lachine—LaSalle is a federal electoral district on Montreal Island in Quebec. It encompasses a portion of Quebec formerly included in the electoral districts of LaSalle—Émard and Notre-Dame-de-Grâce—Lachine.

Dorval—Lachine—LaSalle was created by the 2012 federal electoral boundaries redistribution and was legally defined in the 2013 representation order. It came into effect upon the call of the 2015 Canadian federal election, which took place October 19, 2015. The riding was originally intended to be named Dorval—Lachine.

Following the 2022 Canadian federal electoral redistribution, the riding lost the area east of Av. 90e East and south of Rue Airlie to LaSalle—Émard—Verdun.

== Geography ==
The district includes the municipalities of Dorval and L'Île-Dorval, the borough of Lachine and part of the borough of LaSalle in Montreal.

== Demographics ==
According to the 2021 Canadian census, 2023 representation order

Racial groups: 58.1% White, 15.4% Black, 7.4% South Asian, 5.4% Chinese, 3.6% Arab, 3.4% Latin American, 1.7% Filipino, 1.3% Indigenous
Languages: 40.3% French, 33.0% English, 3.5% Mandarin, 3.5% Punjabi, 3.4% Spanish, 3.2% Italian, 2.3% Arabic, 1.5% Russian, 1.1% Romanian
Religions: 57.4% Christian (37.7% Catholic, 3.5% Christian Orthodox, 1.9% Pentecostal, 1.8% Anglican, 12.5% Other), 7.9% Muslim, 3.9% Sikh, 1.9% Hindu, 26.8% None
Median income: $37,200 (2020)
Average income: $47,680 (2020)

== Members of Parliament ==
This riding has elected the following members of Parliament:

| Parliament | Years | Member | Party |
|---|---|---|---|
Dorval—Lachine—LaSalle; Riding created from LaSalle—Émard and Notre-Dame-de-Grâce—Lachine
| 42nd | 2015–2019 | Anju Dhillon | Liberal |
| 43rd | 2019–2021 | Anju Dhillon | Liberal |
| 44th | 2021–2025 | Anju Dhillon | Liberal |
| 45th | 2025–present | Anju Dhillon | Liberal |

== Election results ==
2025 Canadian federal election
| Party | Candidate | Votes | % | ±% |
|---|---|---|---|---|
| Liberal | Anju Dhillon | 29,927 | 59.36 | +7.12 |
| Conservative | Alioune Sarr | 10,428 | 20.68 | +8.76 |
| Bloc Québécois | Pauline Fleur Julie Postel | 6,338 | 12.57 | -3.15 |
| New Democratic | Angélique Soleil Lavoie | 2,104 | 4.17 | -8.93 |
| Green | Amir Badr Eldeen | 823 | 1.63 | -1.20 |
| People's | Michael Patterson | 478 | 0.95 | -3.24 |
| Rhinoceros | André Lavigne | 251 | 0.50 | N/A |
| No affiliation | Katy Le Rougetel | 071 | 0.14 | |
| Total valid votes | | 50,420 | 98.79 | |
| Total rejected ballots | | 616 | 1.21 | -0.41 |
| Turnout | | 51,036 | 63.42 | +4.06 |
| Eligible voters | | 80,468 | | |
| Liberal notional hold | | Swing | | -0.82 |
Source: Elections Canada

2021 federal election redistributed results
| Party | Vote | % |
|---|---|---|
| Liberal | 24,292 | 52.23 |
| Bloc Québécois | 7,310 | 15.72 |
| New Democratic | 6,095 | 13.11 |
| Conservative | 5,546 | 11.93 |
| People's | 1,949 | 4.19 |
| Green | 1,315 | 2.83 |
| Total valid votes | 46,507 | 98.39 |
| Rejected ballots | 763 | 1.61 |
| Registered voters/ estimated turnout | 79,621 | 59.37 |

2021 Canadian federal election
| Party | Candidate | Votes | % | ±% | Expenditures |
|---|---|---|---|---|---|
| Liberal | Anju Dhillon | 25,233 | 52.4 | -0.5 | $41,637.33 |
| Bloc Québécois | Cloé Rose Jenneau | 7,542 | 15.7 | -1.4 | $2,391.48 |
| New Democratic | Fabiola Ngamaleu Teumeni | 6,241 | 13.0 | +1.2 | $12,672.76 |
| Conservative | Jude Bazelais | 5,754 | 12.0 | +1.5 | $32,437.42 |
| People's | Michael Patterson | 2,020 | 4.2 | +3.2 | $4,155.65 |
| Green | Laura Mariani | 1,351 | 2.8 | -2.7 | $11.20 |
| Total valid votes/expense limit | | 48,141 | 98.4 | – | $112,667.14 |
| Total rejected ballots | | 786 | 1.6 | | |
| Turnout | | 48,927 | 59.2 | | |
| Registered voters | | 82,663 | | | |
| Liberal hold | | Swing | | +0.5 | |
Source: Elections Canada

2019 Canadian federal election
| Party | Candidate | Votes | % | ±% | Expenditures |
|---|---|---|---|---|---|
| Liberal | Anju Dhillon | 27,821 | 52.9 | -1.99 | $54,013.89 |
| Bloc Québécois | Jean-Frédéric Vaudry | 8,974 | 17.1 | +7.32 | none listed |
| New Democratic | Lori Morrison | 6,207 | 11.8 | -9.75 | $1,872.86 |
| Conservative | Céline Laquerre | 5,543 | 10.5 | -0.58 | none listed |
| Green | Réjean Malette | 2,898 | 5.5 | +3.22 | none listed |
| People's | Arash Torbati | 528 | 1.0 | – | $0.00 |
| Progressive Canadian | Fang Hu | 426 | 0.8 | – | $0.00 |
| Rhinoceros | Xavier Watso | 177 | 0.3 | – | $0.00 |
| Total valid votes/expense limit | | 52,574 | 100.0 | | |
| Total rejected ballots | | 788 | | | |
| Turnout | | 53,362 | 62.5 | | |
| Eligible voters | | 85,344 | | | |
| Liberal hold | | Swing | | -4.66 | |
Source: Elections Canada

2015 Canadian federal election
| Party | Candidate | Votes | % | ±% | Expenditures |
|---|---|---|---|---|---|
| Liberal | Anju Dhillon | 29,974 | 54.89 | +25.49 | $97,977.49 |
| New Democratic | Isabelle Morin | 11,769 | 21.55 | -19.57 | $52,909.84 |
| Conservative | Daniela Chivu | 6,049 | 11.08 | -3.07 | $25,233.35 |
| Bloc Québécois | Jean-Frédéric Vaudry | 5,338 | 9.78 | -1.76 | – |
| Green | Vincent J. Carbonneau | 1,245 | 2.28 | -0.72 | – |
| Independent | Soulèye Ndiaye | 230 | 0.42 | – | $3,623.98 |
| Total valid votes/Expense limit | | 54,605 | 100.0 | | $224,217.32 |
| Total rejected ballots | | 593 | – | – | |
| Turnout | | 55,198 | 64.49 | – | |
| Eligible voters | | 85,587 | | | |
| Liberal gain from NDP | | Swing | | +22.53 | |
Source: Elections Canada

2011 federal election redistributed results
| Party | Vote | % |
|---|---|---|
| New Democratic | 18,713 | 41.12 |
| Liberal | 13,381 | 29.40 |
| Conservative | 6,442 | 14.15 |
| Bloc Québécois | 5,250 | 11.54 |
| Green | 1,364 | 3.00 |
| Others | 362 | 0.80 |

== See also ==
- List of Canadian electoral districts
- Historical federal electoral districts of Canada
