= École secondaire Cavelier-De LaSalle =

Location
- 9199, rue Centrale; LaSalle, Quebec, H8R 2J9; Canada
- Coordinates: 45°25′5″N 73°38′24″W

Information
- School type: Public
- Founded: 1964
- School board: Centre de services scolaire Marguerite-Bourgeoys
- Principal: Mr. Robert Beaudoin
- Grades: 7–11
- Enrollment: 1,874 (2019)
- Language: French
- Area: Montreal
- Website: csmb.gouv.qc.ca/ecoles/cavelier-de-lasalle.aspx
- Last updated: March 18, 2021

École secondaire Cavelier-De LaSalle is a French-language public mixed secondary school located in the borough of LaSalle in Montreal. Part of the Centre de services scolaire Marguerite-Bourgeoys (CSSMB), it was originally in the catholic School board Commission scolaire Sault-Saint-Louis before the 1998 reorganization of School boards from religious communities into linguistic communities in Quebec. In 2019, the school has 1,874 students.

== History ==
In 1967, the ministère de l'Éducation du Québec implement the concept of "écoles polyvalentes" arising from the Parent Commission Report published between 1963 and 1966. Two factors have contributed to the creation of those schools all over Quebec: baby-boomers and urban sprawl. This type of polyvalent schools involve two elements: general education and professional education. Those schools originated from the School Reform in Quebec that puts forward an open education driven by a system based on collaboration, flexibility and openness inside the school. It is in this political context that the École polyvalente Cavelier-De LaSalle was created and the school will be inaugurated in 1964 with some extensions made afterwards.

The school is named after the area's first lord and French explorer Robert René Cavelier de La Salle (born at Rouen, France in 1643, died in Texas USA in 1687).

== School and facilities ==
The establishment has two stories and few windows. The building is in a monolithic block in brown bricks highlighted by some elements in concrete. The school contained mainly regular classrooms, science labs, plastic art workshops, a cafeteria, a library and an auditorium. The Sports facilities comprised a gymnasium. Today, we can find computer labs, a music room, outdoor facilities such as a 400 m running track, 3 soccer fields, a baseball field and 8 tennis courts in the Laurier-McDonald park located nearby.

== Activities ==
- Chess
- Cultural Trips
- Cooking classes
- Dance
- Debate Club
- Environment Brigade
- Fabrication Laboratory
- Improvisationnel Theatre
- Media creation
- Music
- Musical Theatre
- Poetry
- Race Club
- Robotics
- Shows
- Singing
- Slam
- Science Expo
- Ski Club
- Technical staging
- Theatre
- Visual Arts Exhibition
- Yoga

== 2012 video incident ==
In June 2012, a substitute teacher at the school showed students a video that reportedly depicted the murder of Concordia University student Jun Lin. The teacher was suspended with pay by the school the same day, and a crisis team of counsellors was sent to the school.

== Famous teacher ==
- Isabelle Morin, taught French in the Dramatic Arts program at the school before she was elected to the Canadian House of Commons in the 2011 Canadian federal election.

== Famous alumni ==
- José Gaudet, humorist in Les Grandes Gueules
- Stéphane Rousseau, actor and comedian
- Mario Tessier, humorist in Les Grandes Gueules
- Marie-Élaine Thibert, singer
