= Enrico Ciccone =

Canadian ice hockey player

Enrico Ciccone MNA
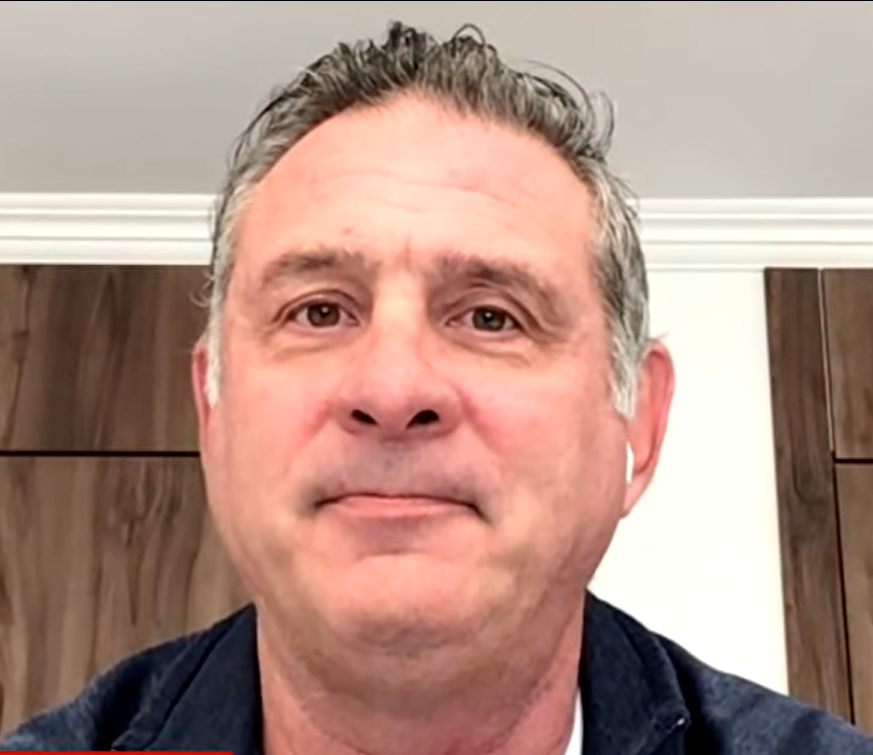
- Enrico Ciccone in 2024

Member of the National Assembly of Quebec for Marquette
- Incumbent
- Assumed office October 1, 2018
- Preceded by: François Ouimet

Personal details
- Born: April 10, 1970 (age 56) Montreal, Quebec, Canada
- Party: Quebec Liberal Party
- Profession: Ice hockey defenceman
Ice hockey career
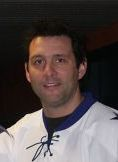
- Enrico Ciccone in 2007
- Height: 6 ft 4 in (193 cm)
- Weight: 200 lb (91 kg; 14 st 4 lb)
- Position: Defence
- Shot: Left
- Played for: Minnesota North Stars; Washington Capitals; Tampa Bay Lightning; Chicago Blackhawks; Carolina Hurricanes; Vancouver Canucks; Montreal Canadiens
- NHL draft: 92nd overall, 1990; Minnesota North Stars
- Playing career: 1991–2001

Enrico Pasquale Ciccone (born April 10, 1970) is a Canadian politician and former professional ice hockey defenceman who played in the National Hockey League (NHL). He currently represents Marquette as a member of the Quebec Liberal Party.

== Hockey career ==
Ciccone is best known for his role in a 1992 incident while playing for the International Hockey League's Kalamazoo Wings in which he was arrested on a battery charge after San Diego Gulls photographer Essy Ghavameddini was cut and received a deep bruise below his left eye that required stitches. Ciccone assaulted him after entering the penalty box from which Ghavameddini was photographing the game.

Ciccone was drafted in 1990 by the Minnesota North Stars. After playing just 31 games with the North Stars, he was traded to the Washington Capitals prior to the 1993–94 NHL season. After just 51 games, he was traded to the Tampa Bay Lightning at the trade deadline. Ciccone also played for the Chicago Blackhawks, Carolina Hurricanes, and Vancouver Canucks before he returned for a second tour with the Lightning. During the 1998–99 season the Lightning traded him to the Capitals for his second tour in Washington. His final NHL games were played with the Montreal Canadiens and he retired on December 8, 2000.

In 374 NHL games, Ciccone scored 10 goals and 18 assists, and amassed 1,469 penalty minutes.

Ciccone became caught in a minor incident during the 1996 Stanley Cup Playoffs, when during a game 2 loss to the Colorado Avalanche in the second round, Ciccone was given a 10-minute misconduct penalty, and had to go to the Blackhawks' locker room. Ciccone was seen shoving a referee as he was leaving the ice, and as he was walking to the locker room, was apparently struck by a cup of popcorn thrown by a Colorado fan, which caused Ciccone to briefly attack the fan, before he was hustled away by a security guard. As he was escorted away, Ciccone tried to pull himself away from the security guard and inadvertently struck the guard in the face. The security guard was also an off-duty detective with the Denver police department, and Ciccone avoided charges and a possible arrest by making a public apology the next day.

== Political career ==
On August 16, 2018, Ciccone announced that he was going to be running as a candidate for the Quebec Liberal Party in the riding of Marquette for the 2018 Quebec general election. He won this election on October 1, 2018. As of September 7, 2024, he serves as the opposition critic for Sports, Recreation and Healthy Living; Bas-Saint-Laurent; and Gaspésie-Îles-de-la-Madeleine.

== Personal life ==
Ciccone formerly worked as a hockey player agent, and was also part of the French broadcast team for the Ottawa Senators. Ciccone is also honored in the Puck in Drublic hockey league, with one of the divisions being named after him.

== Career statistics ==
Bold indicates led league

=== Regular season and playoffs ===
			Regular season					Playoffs
Season	Team	League	GP	G	A	Pts	PIM	GP	G	A	Pts	PIM
1987–88	Shawinigan Cataractes	QMJHL	61	2	12	14	324	11	0	0	0	36
1988–89	Shawinigan Cataractes	QMJHL	34	7	11	18	132	—	—	—	—	—
1988–89	Trois Rivieres Draveurs	QMJHL	24	0	8	8	157	2	0	0	0	4
1989–90	Trois Rivieres Draveurs	QMJHL	40	4	24	28	227	3	0	0	0	15
1990–91	Kalamazoo Wings	IHL	57	4	9	13	384	4	0	1	1	32
1991–92	Kalamazoo Wings	IHL	53	4	16	20	406	10	0	1	1	58
1991–92	Minnesota North Stars	NHL	11	0	0	0	48	—	—	—	—	—
1992–93	Kalamazoo Wings	IHL	13	1	3	4	50	—	—	—	—	—
1992–93	Hamilton Canucks	AHL	6	1	3	4	44	—	—	—	—	—
1992–93	Minnesota North Stars	NHL	31	0	1	1	115	—	—	—	—	—
1993–94	Portland Pirates	AHL	6	0	0	0	27	—	—	—	—	—
1993–94	Washington Capitals	NHL	46	1	1	2	174	—	—	—	—	—
1993–94	Tampa Bay Lightning	NHL	11	0	1	1	52	—	—	—	—	—
1994–95	Tampa Bay Lightning	NHL	41	2	4	6	**225**	—	—	—	—	—
1995–96	Tampa Bay Lightning	NHL	55	2	3	5	258	—	—	—	—	—
1995–96	Chicago Blackhawks	NHL	11	0	1	1	48	9	1	0	1	30
1996–97	Chicago Blackhawks	NHL	67	2	2	4	223	4	0	0	0	18
1997–98	Carolina Hurricanes	NHL	14	0	3	3	83	—	—	—	—	—
1997–98	Vancouver Canucks	NHL	13	0	1	1	47	—	—	—	—	—
1997–98	Tampa Bay Lightning	NHL	12	0	0	0	45	—	—	—	—	—
1998–99	Cleveland Lumberjacks	IHL	6	0	0	0	23	—	—	—	—	—
1998–99	Tampa Bay Lightning	NHL	16	1	1	2	24	—	—	—	—	—
1998–99	Washington Capitals	NHL	43	2	0	2	103	—	—	—	—	—
1999–00	Essen Mosquitoes	DEL	14	0	4	4	101	—	—	—	—	—
2000–01	Montreal Canadiens	NHL	3	0	0	0	14	—	—	—	—	—
2000–01	Quebec Citadelles	AHL	2	0	0	0	22	—	—	—	—	—
NHL totals			374	10	18	28	1469	13	1	0	1	48

== Electoral record ==
2026 Quebec general election: Marquette
** Preliminary results — Not yet official **
Party	Candidate	Votes	%	±%
Liberal	Enrico Ciccone	14,498	55.29	
Parti Québécois	Guillaume de Palma-Demers	3,847	14.67	
Québec solidaire	Pascal Malo	2,776	10.59	
Conservative	Richard Zilversmit	2,703	10.31	
Coalition Avenir Québec	Mahsa Barani	1,761	6.72	
Green	Rachid Jemmah	327	1.25	
Canadian	Alexandre Pendenza	308	1.17	
Total valid votes				
Total rejected ballots				
Turnout			58.26	
Electors on the lists				
Electors on the lists			–	–
Source: Élections Québec

2022 Quebec general election: Marquette
Party	Candidate	Votes	%	±%
Liberal	Enrico Ciccone	12,255	46.73	+3.74
Coalition Avenir Québec	Marc Baaklini	5,722	21.82	-6.52
Québec solidaire	Jérémy Côté	2,956	11.27	-0.20
Conservative	Sam Nassr	2,395	9.13	+6.95
Parti Québécois	Stéphane Richard	2,114	8.06	+0.28
Green	Shameem Jauffur	682	2.60	-1.44
Independent	Félix Vincent Ardea	100	0.38	–
Total valid votes		26,224	98.89	
Total rejected ballots		294	1.11	
Turnout		26,518	58.32	-1.29
Electors on the lists		45,472		

2018 Quebec general election: Marquette
Party	Candidate	Votes	%	±%
Liberal	Enrico Ciccone	11,819	42.99	-19.52
Coalition Avenir Québec	Marc Hétu	7,793	28.34	+14.95
Québec solidaire	Anick Perreault	3,153	11.47	+5.59
Parti Québécois	Carole Vincent	2,139	7.78	-6.74
Green	Kimberly Salt	1,111	4.04	+1.95
Conservative	Olivia Boye	599	2.18	+1.58
New Democratic	John Symon	596	2.17	–
Citoyens au pouvoir	Patrick Desjardins	150	0.55	–
Independent	Roger Déry	134	0.49	–
Total valid votes		27,494	98.69	
Total rejected ballots		366	1.31	
Turnout		27,860	59.61	-11.54
Eligible voters		46,740		
Liberal hold		Swing		-17.24
Source(s) "Rapport des résultats officiels du scrutin". Élections Québec.
