= Montigny-Lengrain =

- Commune
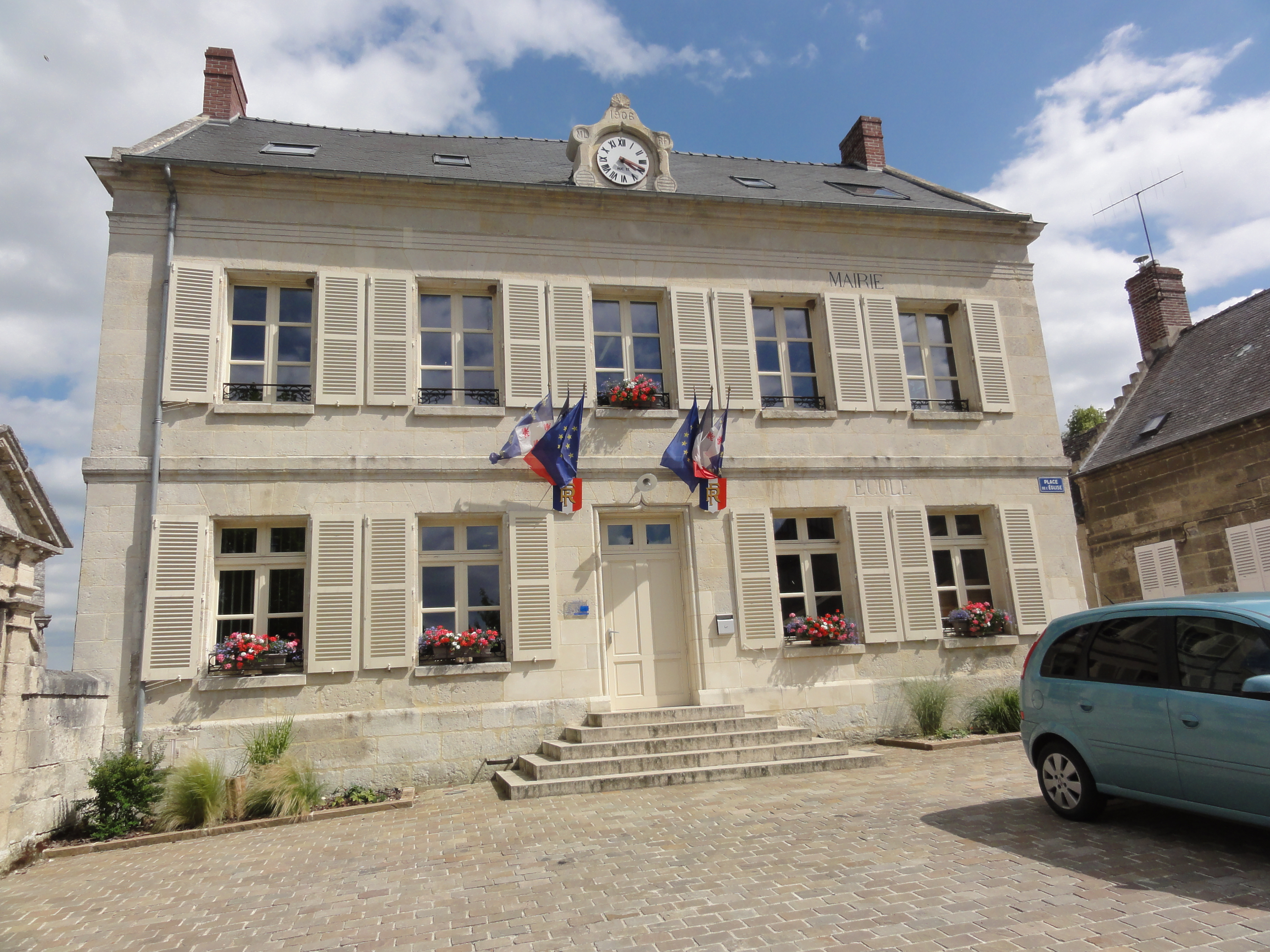
- The town hall and school of Montigny-Lengrain

- Coat of arms
- Location of Montigny-Lengrain
- Location within France Location within Hauts-de-France
- Coordinates: 49°22′20″N 3°06′00″E
- Country: France
- Region: Hauts-de-France
- Department: Aisne
- Arrondissement: Soissons
- Canton: Vic-sur-Aisne

Government
  - Mayor (2026–32): Chantal Mouny
- Area^{1}: 11.38 km^{2} (4.39 sq mi)
- Highest elevation: 163 m (535 ft)
- Lowest elevation: 36 m (118 ft)
- Population (2023): 674
  - Density: 59.2/km^{2} (153/sq mi)
- Time zone: UTC+01:00 (CET)
  - Summer (DST): UTC+02:00 (CEST)
- INSEE/Postal code: 02514 /02290
- ^{1} French Land Register data, which excludes lakes, ponds, glaciers > 1 km^{2} (0.386 sq mi or 247 acres) and river estuaries.

Montigny-Lengrain (French pronunciation: [mɔ̃tiɲi lɑ̃ɡʁɛ̃]) is a commune in the Aisne department in Hauts-de-France in northern France.

== Population ==
Historical population
Year	Pop.	±% p.a.
1968	617	—
1975	584	−0.78%
1982	574	−0.25%
1990	585	+0.24%
1999	635	+0.92%
2007	660	+0.48%
2012	685	+0.75%
2017	702	+0.49%
2023	674	−0.68%
Source: INSEE

== History ==
On Easter day 945, the castle of Montigny-Lengrain, guarded by the faithful of King Louis IV of France, was taken by Herbert III of Vermandois, assisted by the Count of Tours and Blois Thibaud. The latter, vassal of Hugues the Great, participates in it as indirect support of Hugues to the fight against the king. (Y Sassier, Hugues Capet, Paris, Fayard, 2008, p115.)

== Places and Monuments ==
- Church of Saint-Martin de Montigny-Lengrain, historical monument since 1921.
- The Renaissance cross within the walls of the church, become with the church historical monument
- The monument to the dead.
- Road crosses.
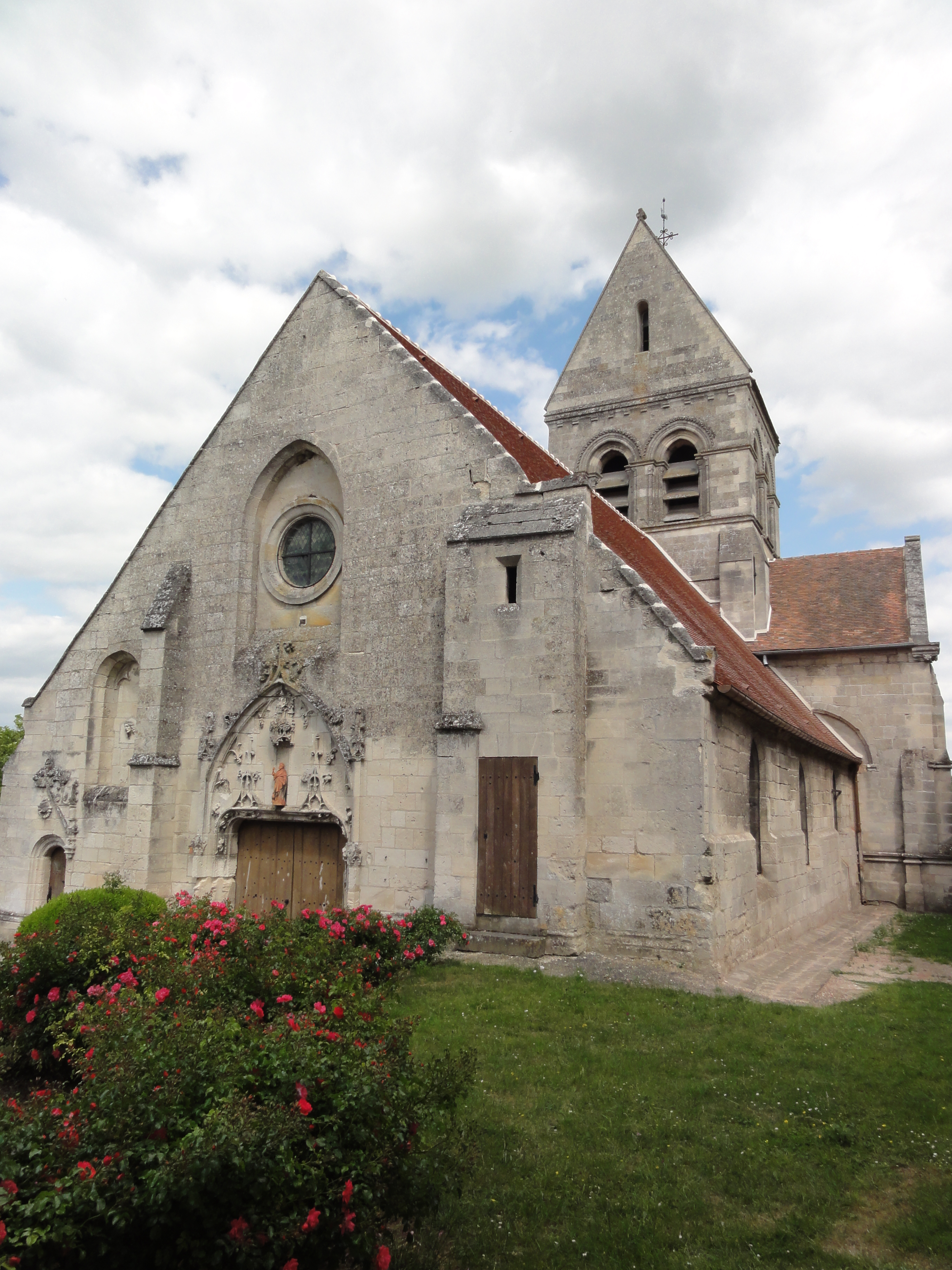
Église Saint-Martin

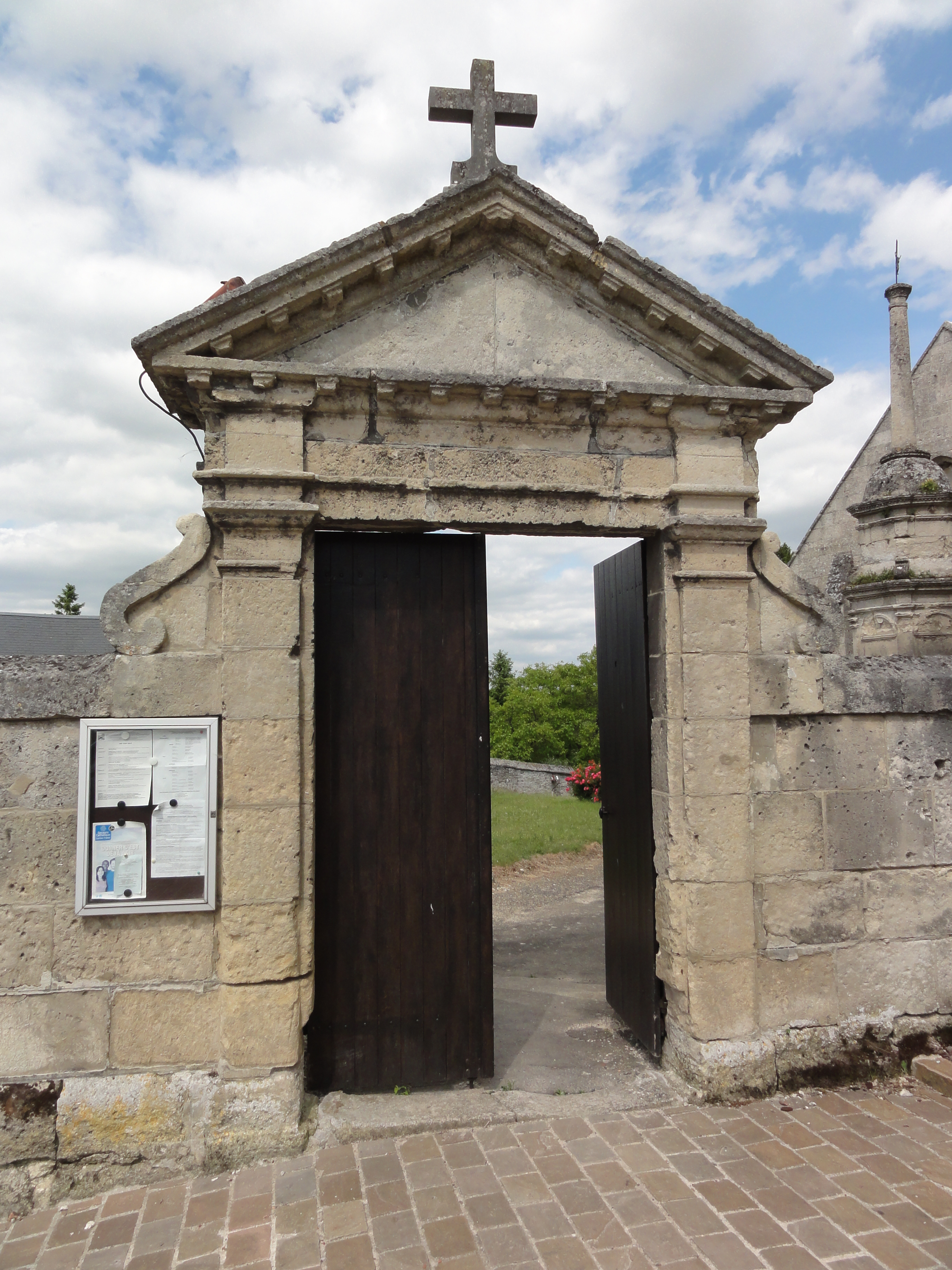
portail de l'ancien cimetière

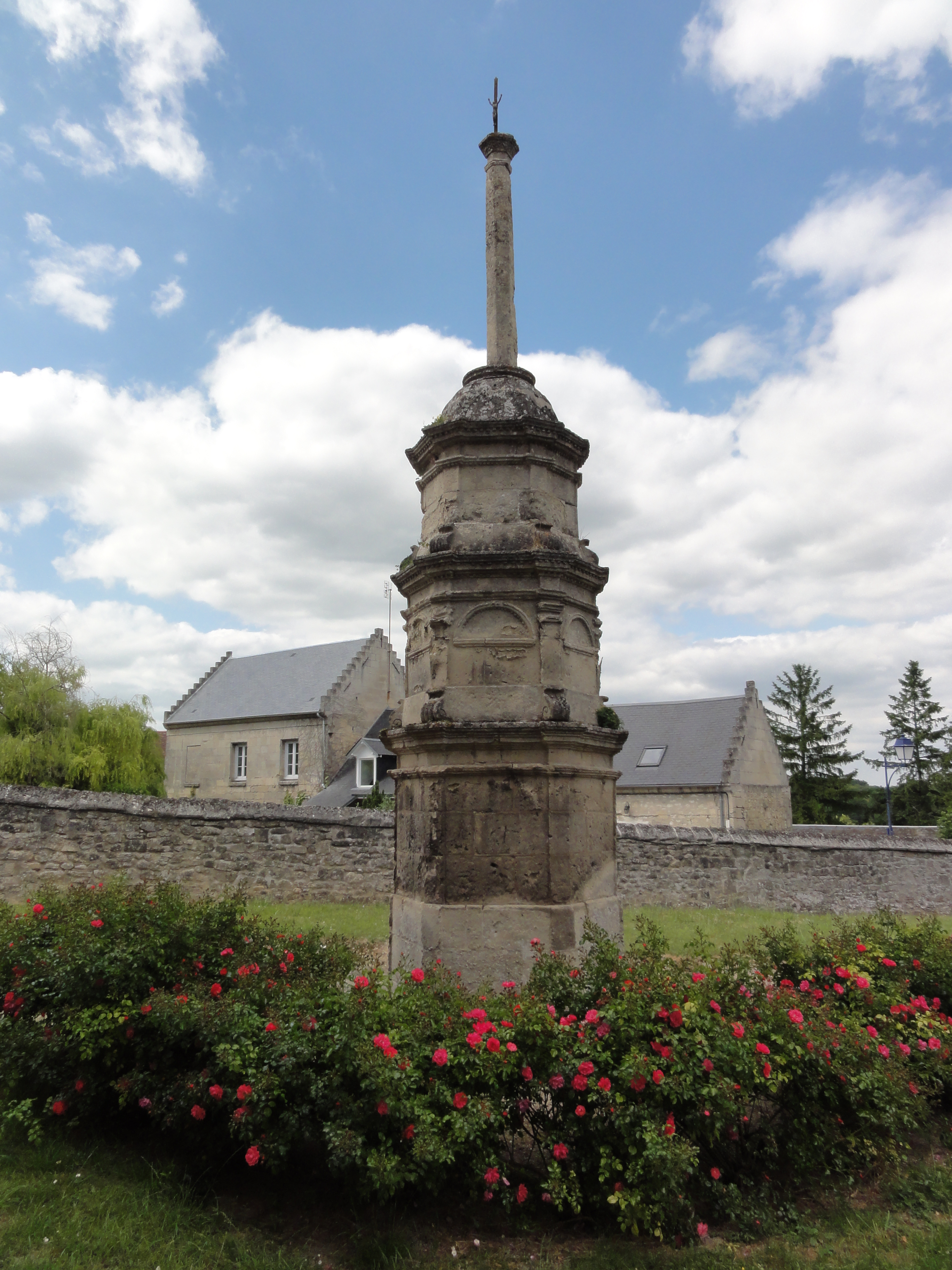
Croix Renaissance, MH

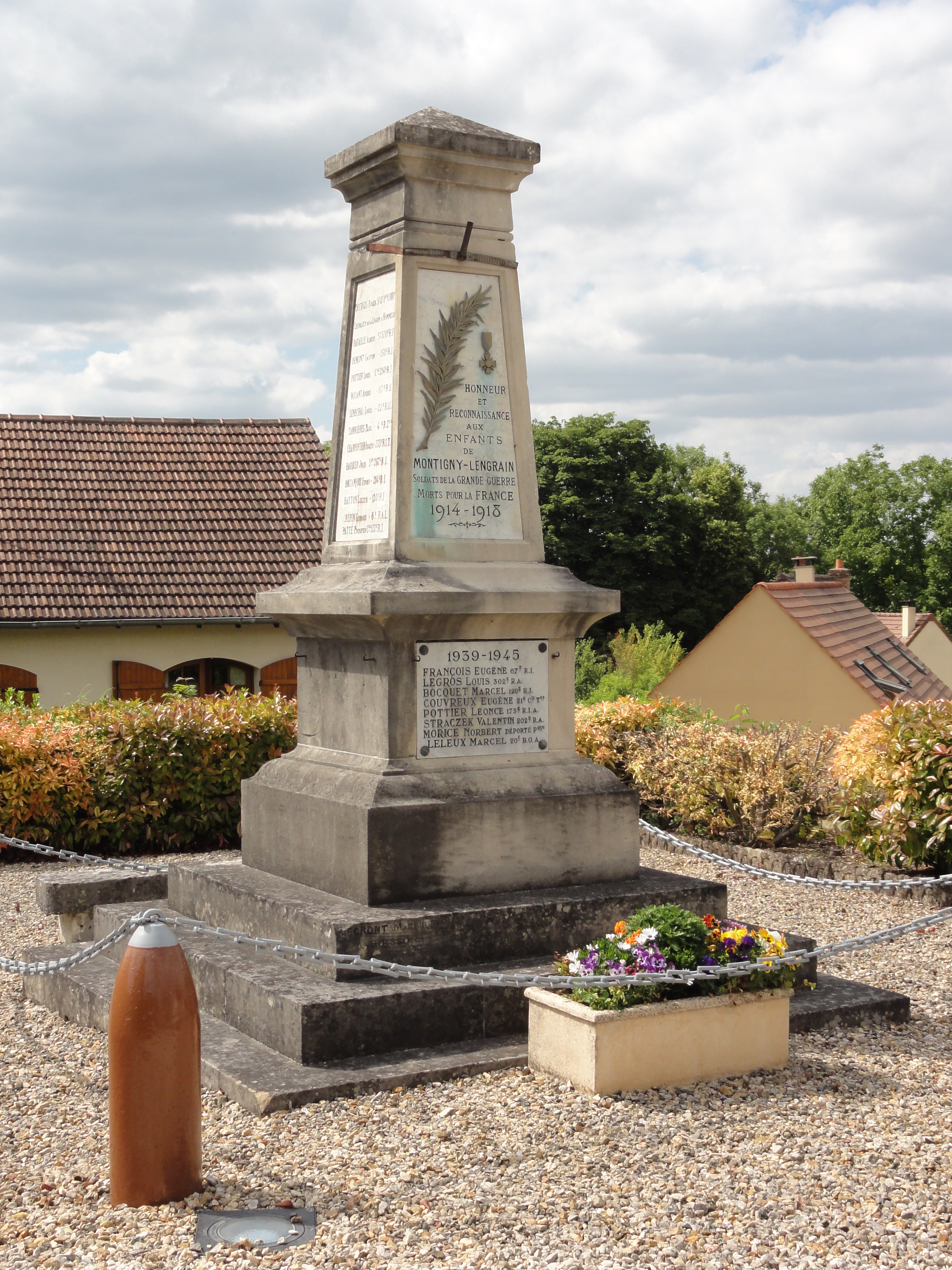
Monument aux morts

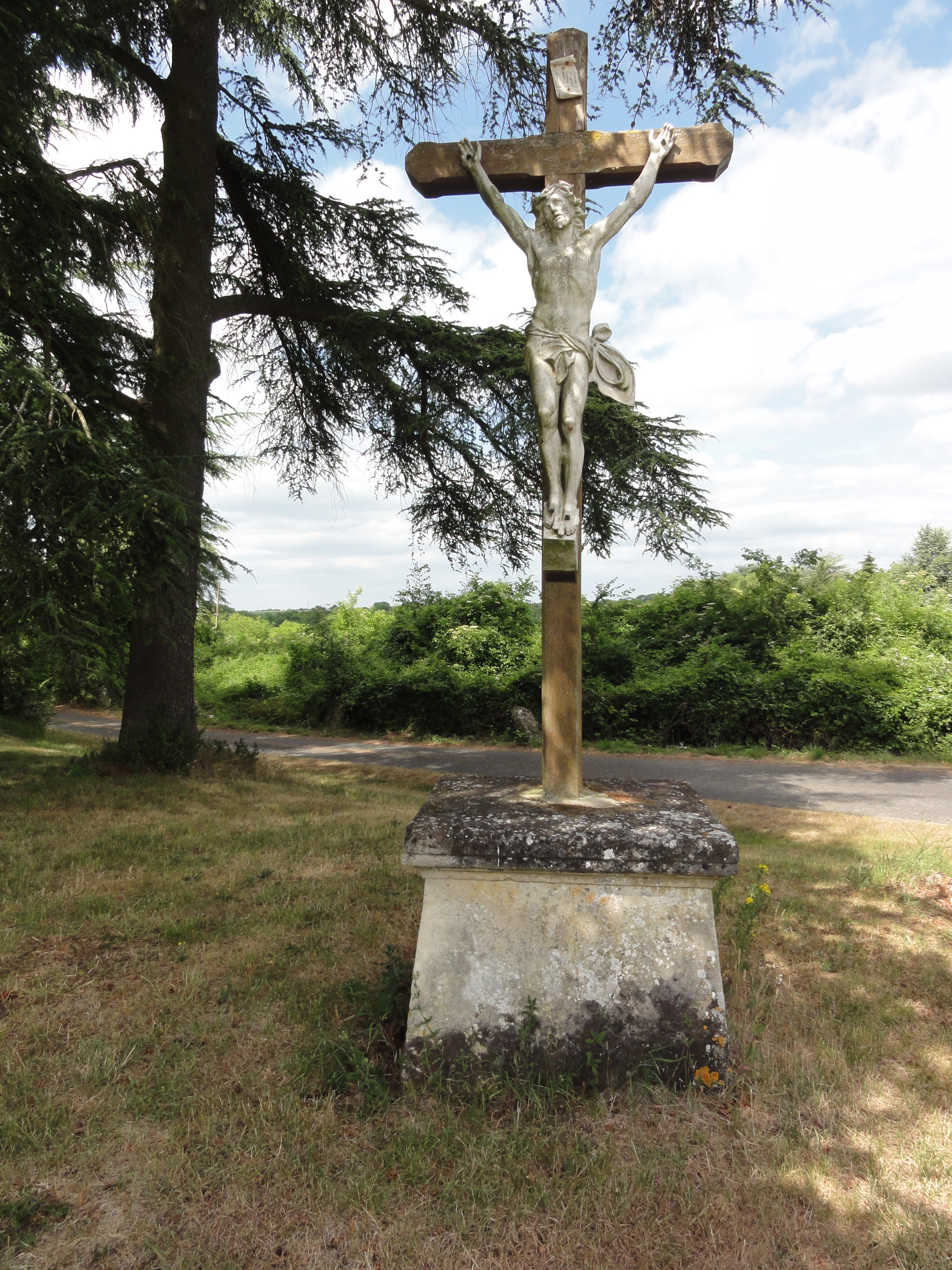
Un croix de chemin

== See also ==
- Communes of the Aisne department
