= Dorval-Jean-XXIII =

Location
- 1301 Avenue Dawson; Dorval, Quebec; Canada; 45.44464°N 73.757353°W

Information
- Established: 1966
- School board: CSSMB
- Principal: Frédéric LHERAULT
- Grades: 5
- Age: 12+
- Enrollment: 1200
- Website: csmb.qc.ca/fr-CA/secondaire/ecoles/liste/dorval-jean-xxiii dorvaljean23.ecoleouestmtl.com

Dorval-Jean-XXIII is a high school located in the city of Dorval on the Island of Montreal. It is a French school which has two buildings. The first building contains Secondary I, II, autism spectrum disorder (ASD) and the welcome classes, while the other building contains Secondary III, IV, V, MEED (Differentiated and Explicit Teaching Modules) and other classes. The school has around 1200 pupils. Dorval-Jean-XXIII is located near the Complexe aquatique et sportif de Dorval. Dorval-Jean-XXIII was the site of the music video for the song Titanium by David Guetta, filmed in 2011. The school has an IB program, a music program (Art-Études and L’Harmonie) and a sports program (Concentration Sport).
