= Dorval station =

Dorval station may refer to:

- Dorval station (Exo), a commuter rail station in Montreal
- Dorval station (Via Rail), an intercity rail station in Montreal
