= Félix-Leclerc Secondary School =

Félix-Leclerc

Location
- 311 Avenue Inglewood; Pointe-Claire, Quebec; Canada
- Coordinates: 45.4491°N 73.8270°W

Information
- Established: 1960
- School board: CSMB
- Category: High School, Secondary
- Director: Annic Bisonnette
- Grades: 7-11
- Language: French, English as second language
- Mascot: Bleu Et Blanc

L'école secondaire Félix-Leclerc is a French speaking secondary school located in Pointe-Claire, Quebec, Canada. It is named after the Canadian singer Félix Leclerc. The school provides secondary education, starting from secondary 1 to 5 (grade 7-11). The school also offers a special International program called Excellence.
