= List of crossings of the Rivière des Prairies =

This is a list of bridges and other crossings of the Rivière des Prairies from the Saint Lawrence River upstream to the Ottawa River (Lac des Deux Montagnes).

Crossing	Year	Carries	Location	Coordinates and comments
Le Gardeur Bridge		Route 138	connects Montreal (Rivière-des-Prairies–Pointe-aux-Trembles) with Repentigny (North Shore) via Île Bourdon	
Laurier Railway Bridge		Canadian National Railway; Via Rail	connects Montreal (Rivière-des-Prairies–Pointe-aux-Trembles) with Repentigny/Charlemagne (North Shore) via Île Bourdon	
Charles de Gaulle Bridge		Autoroute 40	connects Montreal (Rivière-des-Prairies—Pointe-aux-Trembles) with Terrebonne (Lachenaie district) (North Shore)	
Olivier Charbonneau Bridge(in French)		Autoroute 25	connects Montreal (Rivière-des-Prairies–Pointe-aux-Trembles) with Laval (Saint-François) (Île Jésus)	*2011 ^{[A]}
Pie IX Bridge		Route 125	connects Montreal (Montreal North) with Laval (Duvernay/Saint-Vincent-de-Paul) (Île Jésus)	
Centrale de la Rivière des Prairies (3 dams)		Hydro-Québec	connects Montreal (Ahuntsic-Cartierville) with Laval (Duvernay) via Île de la Visitation and Île du Cheval de Terre, dam from Montreal to Île de la Visitation is upstream from (west of) the Papineau-Leblanc Bridge.	
Papineau-Leblanc Bridge		Autoroute 19	connects Montreal (Ahuntsic-Cartierville) with Laval (Duvernay)	
Viau Bridge		Route 335	connects Montreal (Ahuntsic-Cartierville) with Laval (Pont-Viau)	
Montreal Metro Tunnel		Montreal Metro Line 2 Orange	connects Montreal (Ahuntsic-Cartierville) with Laval (Pont-Viau)	
Unnamed bridge			connects Montreal (Ahuntsic-Cartierville) with Île Perry, Partial crossing	
Bordeaux Railway Bridge		Canadian Pacific Railway; Quebec Gatineau Railway; RTM Saint-Jerome	connects Montreal (Ahuntsic-Cartierville) with Laval (Laval-des-Rapides) (via Île Perry). Includes a bicycle bridgeRoute Verte 1 & 2	
Médéric Martin Bridge		Autoroute 15/Trans-Canada Highway	connects Montreal (Ahuntsic-Cartierville) with Laval (Laval-des-Rapides)	
Lachapelle Bridge		Route 117	connects Montreal (Ahuntsic-Cartierville and Saint-Laurent) with Laval (Chomedey)	
Unnamed bridge		Promenade des Îles	connects Laval (Chomedey) with Île du Tremblay (Chomedey) only	Partial crossing
Unnamed bridge		Promenade des Îles	connects Île du Tremblay (Chomedey) with Île Paton (Chomedey) only	Partial crossing
Unnamed bridge		Promenade des Îles	connects Laval (Chomedey) with Île Paton (Chomedey) only	Partial crossing
Louis Bisson Bridge		Autoroute 13	connects Montreal (Pierrefonds-Roxboro/Ahuntsic-Cartierville and Saint-Laurent) with Laval (Chomedey and Sainte-Dorothée)	
Road bridge (name, if any, to come)			connects Îles Laval with Sainte-Dorothée within Laval only	Partial crossing
Railway bridges, R des P	1916	Canadian National Railway; RTM Deux-Montagnes	connects Montreal (Pierrefonds-Roxboro) with Îles Laval (Île-Bigras station); Now owned by the RTM	
Railway bridges, R des P	1916	Canadian National Railway; RTM Deux-Montagnes	connects Îles Laval with Sainte-Dorothée on Île Jésus (Laval Island).	
Guy Lafleur Bridge		Boulevard Jacques Bizard	connects Sainte-Geneviève with Île Bizard	Partial crossing
Laval-sur-le-Lac Île-Bizard Ferry			a reaction ferry connecting Montreal (Île Bizard) with Laval (Laval-sur-le-Lac)	Seasonal Partial crossing

== See also ==
- List of bridges in Quebec
- List of bridges to the Island of Montreal
- List of bridges spanning the Rivière des Prairies
- List of crossings of the Saint Lawrence River
- List of crossings of the Rivière des Mille Îles
- List of hydroelectric stations
- List of crossings of the Ottawa River

== Notes ==
^{A} Construction of the Highway 25 Bridge started in early 2008 and was finished in May 2011. It is a toll bridge.
