= List of bridges to the Island of Montreal =

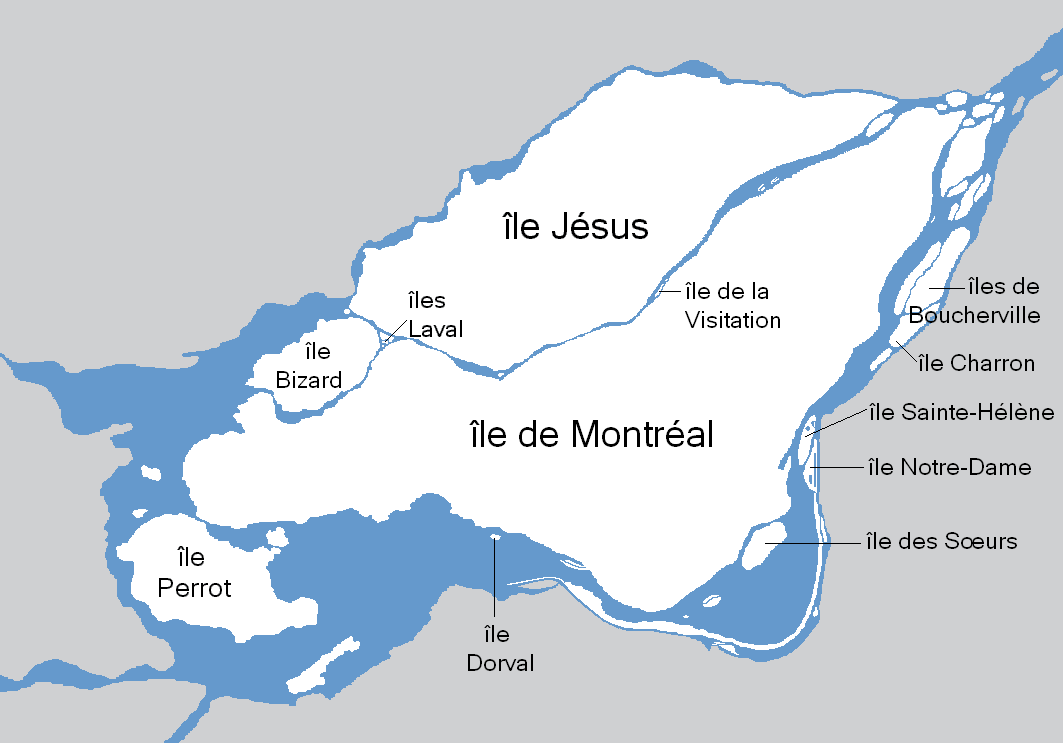
Bridges are required to connect Montreal to the mainland (gray).

Like most major cities, Montreal needs easy highway access from its suburbs and surrounding areas. However, because Montreal was built on an island surrounded by three rivers, it can be accessed by land only on a bridge or through a tunnel. Although the city was founded in 1642, it was not until 1847 that the first fixed link to the outside was established, when a wooden bridge was built across Rivière des Prairies to Île Jésus, on the site of what is now Ahuntsic Bridge. Another bridge was built immediately afterward, a few kilometers west, which became Lachapelle Bridge, and another in 1849, Pont des Saints-Anges, to the east. The latter bridge collapsed in the 1880s and was never rebuilt.

With the advent of the railroad, Montreal got a fixed link to the mainland; in 1854 railroad bridges were built in Sainte-Anne-de-Bellevue, across both channels of the Ottawa River, linking Montreal Island to Ontario and the Vaudreuil-Soulanges peninsula through Perrot Island. In 1860, Montreal got its first link to the South Shore with the construction of Victoria Bridge, which was, at the time of its opening, the longest bridge in the world. Indirect links to the North Shore also had to wait for railroad construction, but this took longer; the Canadian Pacific Railway opened its link to Saint-Jérôme in 1876, through Île Jésus.

== Crossings ==
This list of bridges and other fixed links serving the Island of Montreal proceeds counter-clockwise around the island from southwest, at the exit of Lake Saint-Louis, downstream along the St. Lawrence River, then upstream along Rivière des Prairies all the way to Lake of Two Mountains, then downstream again along the East Channel of the Ottawa River until it reaches Lake Saint-Louis. The year of construction is that of the structure currently in place, accompanied by the year of construction of the original structure if the current one replaced an older span.

Key: Communities linked by individual bridges
(M): Montreal-side municipality and borough
(I): Island(s) crossed, if any
(O): Opposite-side municipality and borough

=== Spanning the Saint Lawrence River and Saint Lawrence Seaway ===
The crossing of the Saint Lawrence River has always proved problematic for engineers due to width, depth, currents, and ice cover. The construction of Victoria Bridge for the Grand Trunk Railway, which was the longest bridge in the world at 2 kilometres (1.2 mi) when it first opened in 1860, highlighted the problems presented by this natural obstacle. Not to be outdone by its rival, however, the Canadian Pacific Railway built its own span, the Saint-Laurent Railway Bridge, upstream from the Lachine Rapids in 1886. The Mohawks of Kahnawake were hired to erect the steel superstructure. Although Victoria Bridge was also used as a road crossing since 1898, it was not before the 1930s that two fully dedicated road bridges, Jacques-Cartier and Mercier, were built. More spans, including Louis-Hippolyte Lafontaine Bridge–Tunnel and Champlain Bridge, were built in the 1960s. No new span was built for over 50 years until a replacement Champlain Bridge was constructed at a cost of several billion dollars. It opened in 2019, while the previous span was closed to traffic to be demolished.

The construction of the Saint Lawrence Seaway in the 1950s required extensive modifications for all spans that existed at the time. Those are not reflected in the table below.

Span	Picture	First span built	Current span built	Communities linked	Carries	Name origin	Coordinates
Saint-Laurent Railway Bridge	A bridge with two truss sections in the middle.	1886	1910	(M) Borough of LaSalle	CPKC; Exo Candiac commuter train	Saint Lawrence River	45°25′8″N 73°39′34″W
Saint-Laurent Railway Bridge	A bridge with two truss sections in the middle.	1886	1910	(O) Kahnawake Mohawk Reserve	CPKC; Exo Candiac commuter train	Saint Lawrence River	45°25′8″N 73°39′34″W
Honoré Mercier Bridge	A view of a twinned steel truss bridge, from between the spans.	—	1934, 1963^{[A]}	(M) Borough of LaSalle	Route 138	Honoré Mercier (1840–1894), Premier of Quebec	45°25′0″N 73°39′18″W
Honoré Mercier Bridge	A view of a twinned steel truss bridge, from between the spans.	—	1934, 1963^{[A]}	(O) Kahnawake Mohawk Reserve	Route 138	Honoré Mercier (1840–1894), Premier of Quebec	45°25′0″N 73°39′18″W
Champlain Bridge Ice Structure	A normal box girder bridge, but with closely spaced pillars.	—	1964^{[B]}	(M) Borough of Verdun	Route Verte 1 and 2	Samuel de Champlain (c. 1580–1635), founder of Quebec City	45°27′57″N 73°31′11″W
Champlain Bridge Ice Structure	A normal box girder bridge, but with closely spaced pillars.	—	1964^{[B]}	(O) St. Lawrence Seaway levee	Route Verte 1 and 2	Samuel de Champlain (c. 1580–1635), founder of Quebec City	45°27′57″N 73°31′11″W
Samuel De Champlain Bridge	A view of the new bridge's main span.	1962^{[C]}	2019	(M) Borough of Verdun	Autoroutes 10, 15, and 20	Samuel de Champlain (c. 1580–1635), founder of Quebec City	45°28′7″N 73°31′15″W
Samuel De Champlain Bridge	A view of the new bridge's main span.	1962^{[C]}	2019	(I) Île des Sœurs (exit)	Autoroutes 10, 15, and 20	Samuel de Champlain (c. 1580–1635), founder of Quebec City	45°28′7″N 73°31′15″W
Samuel De Champlain Bridge	A view of the new bridge's main span.	1962^{[C]}	2019	(O) Brossard	Autoroutes 10, 15, and 20	Samuel de Champlain (c. 1580–1635), founder of Quebec City	45°28′7″N 73°31′15″W
Victoria Bridge	The numerous truss sections of a long bridge across a large body of water.	1860	1898^{[D]}	(M) Borough of Le Sud-Ouest	Route 112; Canadian National Railway (CN); Exo Mont-Saint-Hilaire commuter train; Via Rail and Amtrak passenger trains	Queen Victoria of the United Kingdom (1819–1901)	45°29′29″N 73°31′46″W
Victoria Bridge	The numerous truss sections of a long bridge across a large body of water.	1860	1898^{[D]}	(O) Saint-Lambert	Route 112; Canadian National Railway (CN); Exo Mont-Saint-Hilaire commuter train; Via Rail and Amtrak passenger trains	Queen Victoria of the United Kingdom (1819–1901)	45°29′29″N 73°31′46″W
Pont de la Concorde and Pont des Îles	A steel box-girder bridge, with part of the city skyline in the background.	—	1965^{[E]}	(M) Borough of Ville-Marie	Pierre-Dupuy Avenue and Route Verte 1 and 2	Reference to Montreal's motto, Concordia salus	45°30′22″N 73°32′17″W (Pont de la Concorde) 45°30′28″N 73°31′49″W (Pont des Îles)
Pont de la Concorde and Pont des Îles	A steel box-girder bridge, with part of the city skyline in the background.	—	1965^{[E]}	(O) Île Sainte-Hélène and Île Notre-Dame (Parc Jean-Drapeau), borough of Ville-Marie, Montreal	Pierre-Dupuy Avenue and Route Verte 1 and 2	Reference to Montreal's motto, Concordia salus	45°30′22″N 73°32′17″W (Pont de la Concorde) 45°30′28″N 73°31′49″W (Pont des Îles)
Montreal Metro Tunnel	The exterior of a subway station entrance.	—	1966	(M) Borough of Ville-Marie (Berri–UQAM station)	Line 4 Yellow	—	45°30′N 73°32′W
Montreal Metro Tunnel	The exterior of a subway station entrance.	—	1966	(I) Île Sainte-Hélène (Jean-Drapeau station) and Île Notre-Dame	Line 4 Yellow	—	45°30′N 73°32′W
Montreal Metro Tunnel	The exterior of a subway station entrance.	—	1966	(O) Longueuil, borough of Vieux-Longueuil (Longueuil–Université-de-Sherbrooke station)	Line 4 Yellow	—	45°30′N 73°32′W
Jacques Cartier Bridge	Jacques Cariter Bridge is a cantilevered bridge.	—	1930^{[F]}	(M) Borough of Ville-Marie	Route 134 Pedestrians and bicycles	Jacques Cartier (1491–1557), French explorer	45°31′17″N 73°32′28″W
Jacques Cartier Bridge	Jacques Cariter Bridge is a cantilevered bridge.	—	1930^{[F]}	(I) Île Sainte-Hélène (exit) and Île Notre-Dame	Route 134 Pedestrians and bicycles	Jacques Cartier (1491–1557), French explorer	45°31′17″N 73°32′28″W
Jacques Cartier Bridge	Jacques Cariter Bridge is a cantilevered bridge.	—	1930^{[F]}	(O) Longueuil, borough of Vieux-Longueuil	Route 134 Pedestrians and bicycles	Jacques Cartier (1491–1557), French explorer	45°31′17″N 73°32′28″W
Louis-Hippolyte Lafontaine Bridge–Tunnel	An entrance of the Louis Hippolyte Lafontaine tunnel, with a sign telling drivers that they are about to cross the Saint Lawrence.	—	1967^{[G]}	(M) Borough of Mercier–Hochelaga-Maisonneuve	Autoroute 25/Trans-Canada Highway	Louis-Hippolyte Lafontaine (1807–1864), Prime Minister of the United Province of Canada	45°35′0″N 73°29′51″W
Louis-Hippolyte Lafontaine Bridge–Tunnel	An entrance of the Louis Hippolyte Lafontaine tunnel, with a sign telling drivers that they are about to cross the Saint Lawrence.	—	1967^{[G]}	(I) Île Charron (Îles de Boucherville) (exit)	Autoroute 25/Trans-Canada Highway	Louis-Hippolyte Lafontaine (1807–1864), Prime Minister of the United Province of Canada	45°35′0″N 73°29′51″W
Louis-Hippolyte Lafontaine Bridge–Tunnel	An entrance of the Louis Hippolyte Lafontaine tunnel, with a sign telling drivers that they are about to cross the Saint Lawrence.	—	1967^{[G]}	(O) Longueuil, borough of Vieux-Longueuil	Autoroute 25/Trans-Canada Highway	Louis-Hippolyte Lafontaine (1807–1864), Prime Minister of the United Province of Canada	45°35′0″N 73°29′51″W

=== Spanning the Rivière des Prairies ===
Although the Rivière des Prairies is much smaller than the Saint Lawrence, bridge construction there did not begin until the 1840s—when rapid construction began on three wooden toll bridges to what is now Laval, one of which, Pont des Saints-Anges, collapsed in the 1880s and was never rebuilt. The existence of regular ferry services across the river is attested from 1813, but these ferries were discontinued when the bridges opened. The first railroad across the river was opened in 1876, and the Bordeaux Railway Bridge is the oldest fixed link to Laval that is still standing. (Another bridge across Rivière des Mille Îles, which was part of the same line, collapsed in 1882 but was immediately rebuilt.) The highway construction boom of the 1960s and 1970s led to the construction of four new freeway bridges across the river, and the upgrading of the existing Pie IX Bridge to freeway standards.

Span	Picture	First span built	Current span built	Communities linked	Carries	Name origin	Coordinates
Le Gardeur Bridge	A box girder bridge, with a steel truss railway bridge in the background.	—	1939 (widened 1975)	(M) Borough of Rivière-des-Prairies–Pointe-aux-Trembles	Route 138 and Route Verte 5	Pierre Le Gardeur de Repentigny (1605–1648), French lord	45°42′13″N 73°29′1″W
Le Gardeur Bridge	A box girder bridge, with a steel truss railway bridge in the background.	—	1939 (widened 1975)	(I) Île Bourdon	Route 138 and Route Verte 5	Pierre Le Gardeur de Repentigny (1605–1648), French lord	45°42′13″N 73°29′1″W
Le Gardeur Bridge	A box girder bridge, with a steel truss railway bridge in the background.	—	1939 (widened 1975)	(O) Repentigny	Route 138 and Route Verte 5	Pierre Le Gardeur de Repentigny (1605–1648), French lord	45°42′13″N 73°29′1″W
Laurier Railway Bridge	Four truss sections of a railway bridge, supported by stone pillars.	—	1904	(M) Borough of Rivière-des-Prairies–Pointe-aux-Trembles	CN; Via Rail; Exo Mascouche commuter train	Wilfrid Laurier (1841–1919), Prime Minister of Canada	45°42′10″N 73°29′8″W
Laurier Railway Bridge	Four truss sections of a railway bridge, supported by stone pillars.	—	1904	(I) Île Bourdon	CN; Via Rail; Exo Mascouche commuter train	Wilfrid Laurier (1841–1919), Prime Minister of Canada	45°42′10″N 73°29′8″W
Laurier Railway Bridge	Four truss sections of a railway bridge, supported by stone pillars.	—	1904	(O) Charlemagne	CN; Via Rail; Exo Mascouche commuter train	Wilfrid Laurier (1841–1919), Prime Minister of Canada	45°42′10″N 73°29′8″W
Charles de Gaulle Bridge	A wide box girder bridge.	—	1965	(M) Borough of Rivière-des-Prairies–Pointe-aux-Trembles	Autoroute 40	Charles de Gaulle (1890–1970), President of France	45°42′7″N 73°30′32″W
Charles de Gaulle Bridge	A wide box girder bridge.	—	1965	(O) Charlemagne	Autoroute 40	Charles de Gaulle (1890–1970), President of France	45°42′7″N 73°30′32″W
Olivier-Charbonneau Bridge	Olivier-Charbonneau Bridge.	—	2011 ^{[H]}	(M) Borough of Rivière-des-Prairies–Pointe-aux-Trembles	Autoroute 25	Olivier Charbonneau (c.1613-1687), first European settler of Île Jésus.	45°38′16″N 73°37′14″W
Olivier-Charbonneau Bridge	Olivier-Charbonneau Bridge.	—	2011 ^{[H]}	(O) Laval (Saint-François)	Autoroute 25	Olivier Charbonneau (c.1613-1687), first European settler of Île Jésus.	45°38′16″N 73°37′14″W
Pie IX Bridge	A box girder bridge high above the river.	1937	1967	(M) Borough of Montreal North	Route 125	Pope Pius IX (1792–1878)	45°35′57″N 73°38′49″W
Pie IX Bridge	A box girder bridge high above the river.	1937	1967	(O) Laval (Saint-Vincent-de-Paul)	Route 125	Pope Pius IX (1792–1878)	45°35′57″N 73°38′49″W
Centrale de la Rivière des Prairies	A small hydroelectric power station.	—	1930^{[I]}	(M) Borough of Ahuntsic-Cartierville	Hydro-Québec	Rivière des Prairies	45°35′17″N 73°39′21″W
Centrale de la Rivière des Prairies	A small hydroelectric power station.	—	1930^{[I]}	(I) Île de la Visitation and Île du Cheval de Terre	Hydro-Québec	Rivière des Prairies	45°35′17″N 73°39′21″W
Centrale de la Rivière des Prairies	A small hydroelectric power station.	—	1930^{[I]}	(O) Laval (Duvernay)	Hydro-Québec	Rivière des Prairies	45°35′17″N 73°39′21″W
Papineau-Leblanc Bridge	Papineau-Leblanc Bridge is a cable-stayed bridge.	—	1969	(M) Borough of Ahuntsic-Cartierville	Autoroute 19	Louis-Joseph Papineau (1786–1871), leader of the Patriote movement Alpha Leblanc (1908–1962), local landowner	45°34′34″N 73°40′1″W
Papineau-Leblanc Bridge	Papineau-Leblanc Bridge is a cable-stayed bridge.	—	1969	(I) Île de la Visitation	Autoroute 19	Louis-Joseph Papineau (1786–1871), leader of the Patriote movement Alpha Leblanc (1908–1962), local landowner	45°34′34″N 73°40′1″W
Papineau-Leblanc Bridge	Papineau-Leblanc Bridge is a cable-stayed bridge.	—	1969	(O) Laval (Duvernay)	Autoroute 19	Louis-Joseph Papineau (1786–1871), leader of the Patriote movement Alpha Leblanc (1908–1962), local landowner	45°34′34″N 73°40′1″W
Viau Bridge (Ahuntsic Bridge)	A concrete arch bridge.	1847	1962 (widened 1993)	(M) Borough of Ahuntsic-Cartierville	Route 335	Ahuntsic, Huron boy who drowned in 1625 The origin of the name Viau is uncertain.	45°33′26″N 73°40′32″W
Viau Bridge (Ahuntsic Bridge)	A concrete arch bridge.	1847	1962 (widened 1993)	(O) Laval (Pont-Viau)	Route 335	Ahuntsic, Huron boy who drowned in 1625 The origin of the name Viau is uncertain.	45°33′26″N 73°40′32″W
Montreal Metro Tunnel	The interior of the Henri-Bourassa Station.	—	2007	(M) Borough of Ahuntsic-Cartierville (Henri-Bourassa station)	Line 2 Orange	—	45°33′N 73°40′W
Montreal Metro Tunnel	The interior of the Henri-Bourassa Station.	—	2007	(O) Laval (Cartier station)	Line 2 Orange	—	45°33′N 73°40′W
Bordeaux Railway Bridge	A typical railway truss bridge.	—	1876	(M) Borough of Ahuntsic-Cartierville	CPKC; Exo Saint-Jérôme commuter train; Quebec Gatineau Railway; Route Verte 1 and 2	Bordeaux, former town	45°32′53″N 73°41′58″W
Bordeaux Railway Bridge	A typical railway truss bridge.	—	1876	(I) Île Perry	CPKC; Exo Saint-Jérôme commuter train; Quebec Gatineau Railway; Route Verte 1 and 2	Bordeaux, former town	45°32′53″N 73°41′58″W
Bordeaux Railway Bridge	A typical railway truss bridge.	—	1876	(O) Laval (Laval-des-Rapides)	CPKC; Exo Saint-Jérôme commuter train; Quebec Gatineau Railway; Route Verte 1 and 2	Bordeaux, former town	45°32′53″N 73°41′58″W
Médéric Martin Bridge	A wide box girder structure on massive concrete pillars.	—	1958 (widened 1991)	(M) Borough of Ahuntsic-Cartierville	Autoroute 15/Trans-Canada Highway	Médéric Martin (1869–1946), Mayor of Montreal	45°32′25″N 73°42′45″W
Médéric Martin Bridge	A wide box girder structure on massive concrete pillars.	—	1958 (widened 1991)	(O) Laval (Laval-des-Rapides)	Autoroute 15/Trans-Canada Highway	Médéric Martin (1869–1946), Mayor of Montreal	45°32′25″N 73°42′45″W
Lachapelle Bridge (Cartierville Bridge)	Two non-identical steel frame bridges side by side.	1848	1930, 1975	(M) Borough of Ahuntsic-Cartierville	Route 117	Pascal Persillier-Lachapelle, builder of the first bridge	45°31′59″N 73°43′43″W
Lachapelle Bridge (Cartierville Bridge)	Two non-identical steel frame bridges side by side.	1848	1930, 1975	(O) Laval (Chomedey)	Route 117	Pascal Persillier-Lachapelle, builder of the first bridge	45°31′59″N 73°43′43″W
Louis Bisson Bridge	A box girder freeway bridge on thin pillars.	—	1975	(M) Borough of Pierrefonds-Roxboro	Autoroute 13	Louis Bisson (1909–1997), Canadian aviator	45°30′42″N 73°45′54″W
Louis Bisson Bridge	A box girder freeway bridge on thin pillars.	—	1975	(O) Laval (Chomedey / Sainte-Dorothée)	Autoroute 13	Louis Bisson (1909–1997), Canadian aviator	45°30′42″N 73°45′54″W
Île Bigras railway crossing	A typical steel truss railway bridge.	—	1916^{[J]}	(M) Borough of Pierrefonds-Roxboro	CN Formerly used by the Deux-Montagnes commuter train (currently being replaced by the Réseau express métropolitain)	(no official name)	45°30′59″N 73°50′52″W
Île Bigras railway crossing	A typical steel truss railway bridge.	—	1916^{[J]}	(I) (Île Bigras); Île-Bigras commuter train station	CN Formerly used by the Deux-Montagnes commuter train (currently being replaced by the Réseau express métropolitain)	(no official name)	45°30′59″N 73°50′52″W
Île Bigras railway crossing	A typical steel truss railway bridge.	—	1916^{[J]}	(O) Laval (Sainte-Dorothée)	CN Formerly used by the Deux-Montagnes commuter train (currently being replaced by the Réseau express métropolitain)	(no official name)	45°30′59″N 73°50′52″W
Guy Lafleur Bridge	Jacques-Bizard Bridge seen between trees.	1966	2024	(M) Sainte-Geneviève, Montreal, borough of L'Île-Bizard–Sainte-Geneviève	Boulevard Jacques Bizard	Guy Lafleur (1951–2022), ice hockey player and local resident	45°29′15″N 73°52′5″W
Guy Lafleur Bridge	Jacques-Bizard Bridge seen between trees.	1966	2024	(O) Île Bizard (Montreal, borough of L'Île-Bizard–Sainte-Geneviève)	Boulevard Jacques Bizard	Guy Lafleur (1951–2022), ice hockey player and local resident	45°29′15″N 73°52′5″W

=== Spanning the Lake of Two Mountains and the Ottawa River East Channel ===
The first railway bridge to Montreal Island was the Grand Trunk Railway bridge across the Ottawa River East Channel. Along with another bridge built simultaneously across the West Channel, this bridge provided the first fixed link from Montreal to the mainland. It was not until 1925, however, that a fixed road link, formed by Galipeault Bridge and Taschereau Bridge, was built across the Ottawa River from Montreal Island. Île Perrot was the only way out of Montreal to the West before the construction of Île aux Tourtes Bridge, which goes directly to Vaudreuil across the Lake of Two Mountains.

All three spans across the Ottawa River East Channel are twinned by another span, built simultaneously, across the West Channel.

Span	Picture	First span built	Current span built	Communities linked	Carries	Name origin	Coordinates
Île aux Tourtes Bridge	A long box girder bridge seen from several kilometers (miles) away.	—	1966^{[K]}	(M) Senneville	Autoroute 40/Trans-Canada Highway	Île aux Tourtes (literally, Wild Pigeon island)	45°25′13″N 73°59′7″W (Across Lake of Two Mountains)
Île aux Tourtes Bridge	A long box girder bridge seen from several kilometers (miles) away.	—	1966^{[K]}	(I) Île Girwood, Île aux Tourtes	Autoroute 40/Trans-Canada Highway	Île aux Tourtes (literally, Wild Pigeon island)	45°25′13″N 73°59′7″W (Across Lake of Two Mountains)
Île aux Tourtes Bridge	A long box girder bridge seen from several kilometers (miles) away.	—	1966^{[K]}	(O) Vaudreuil-Dorion	Autoroute 40/Trans-Canada Highway	Île aux Tourtes (literally, Wild Pigeon island)	45°25′13″N 73°59′7″W (Across Lake of Two Mountains)
Canadian Pacific Rail Bridge	A steel truss bridge with a locomotive on it.	—	1893	(M) Sainte-Anne-de-Bellevue	CPKC; Exo Vaudreuil-Hudson commuter train	(no official names)	45°24′12″N 73°57′24″W (Across Canal Sainte-Anne)
Canadian Pacific Rail Bridge	A steel truss bridge with a locomotive on it.	—	1893	(I) Île Bellevue	CPKC; Exo Vaudreuil-Hudson commuter train	(no official names)	45°24′12″N 73°57′24″W (Across Canal Sainte-Anne)
Canadian Pacific Rail Bridge	A steel truss bridge with a locomotive on it.	—	1893	(O) Île Perrot	CPKC; Exo Vaudreuil-Hudson commuter train	(no official names)	45°24′12″N 73°57′24″W (Across Canal Sainte-Anne)
Canadian National Rail Bridge	An old railway bridge on stone pillars.	—	1854	(M) Sainte-Anne-de-Bellevue	CN; Via Rail passenger trains to Ottawa/Toronto	(no official names)	45°24′12″N 73°57′24″W (Across Canal Sainte-Anne)
Canadian National Rail Bridge	An old railway bridge on stone pillars.	—	1854	(I) Île Bellevue	CN; Via Rail passenger trains to Ottawa/Toronto	(no official names)	45°24′12″N 73°57′24″W (Across Canal Sainte-Anne)
Canadian National Rail Bridge	An old railway bridge on stone pillars.	—	1854	(O) Île Perrot	CN; Via Rail passenger trains to Ottawa/Toronto	(no official names)	45°24′12″N 73°57′24″W (Across Canal Sainte-Anne)
Galipeault Bridge	Two non-identical box girder bridges over rapids.	1925	1991, 2009^{[L]}	(M) Sainte-Anne-de-Bellevue	Autoroute 20 and Route Verte 5	Antonin Galipeault (1879–1971), Quebec politician	45°24′10″N 73°57′21″W (Across Canal Sainte-Anne)
Galipeault Bridge	Two non-identical box girder bridges over rapids.	1925	1991, 2009^{[L]}	(I) Île Bellevue	Autoroute 20 and Route Verte 5	Antonin Galipeault (1879–1971), Quebec politician	45°24′10″N 73°57′21″W (Across Canal Sainte-Anne)
Galipeault Bridge	Two non-identical box girder bridges over rapids.	1925	1991, 2009^{[L]}	(O) Île Perrot	Autoroute 20 and Route Verte 5	Antonin Galipeault (1879–1971), Quebec politician	45°24′10″N 73°57′21″W (Across Canal Sainte-Anne)

== See also ==
- Crossings of the Canal de l'Aqueduc
- Crossings of the Lachine Canal
- List of crossings of the Ottawa River
- List of crossings of the Rivière des Mille Îles
- Rivière des Prairies
- List of crossings of the Rivière des Prairies
- List of crossings of the Saint Lawrence River
- List of hydroelectric stations in Quebec
- List of bridges in Canada

== Notes ==
^{A} The section of Honoré-Mercier bridge spanning over the St. Lawrence Seaway was rebuilt to seaway standards in the 1950s. The bridge was twinned by an identical one, on the downriver side, which opened in 1963.

^{B} The Champlain Bridge Ice Structure, known in French as "l'Estacade Champlain," was built to control ice floes coming from the Laprairie Basin.

^{C} At the north end of Champlain Bridge, two spans, one north-south (aut. 15 and 20) and one east-west (aut. 10) connect Île des Sœurs to I. of Montreal. These two spans, called Pont Île-des-Sœurs and Pont Clément, are part of the Champlain Bridge complex.

^{D} Victoria Bridge was built as a one-track tubular bridge which opened in 1860. It was the first bridge to cross the St. Lawrence River, and the longest bridge in the world. It was rebuilt as a two-track truss bridge in 1898. The South Y approach was rebuilt around the Saint-Lambert locks of the St. Lawrence Seaway in 1961.

^{E} Pont de la Concorde (Concorde Bridge) and Pont des Îles ("Bridge of the Islands") were built for Expo 67. Pont de la Concorde connects Montreal Island to Saint Helen's Island, while Pont des Îles connects Saint Helen's Island to Notre-Dame Island.

^{F} Jacques-Cartier Bridge was originally named Harbour Bridge/Pont du Havre, and renamed after Jacques Cartier in 1934 (400th anniversary of Cartier's first voyage). The section over the St. Lawrence Seaway was lifted to a new height in 1962.

^{G} The Louis-Hippolyte Lafontaine complex consists of a tunnel from Montreal to Île Charron and a bridge from Île Charron to the South Shore.

^{H} Construction of the Highway 25 Bridge started in early 2008 and was finished in May 2011. It is a toll bridge.

^{I} The Rivière des Prairies hydro complex is a set of three dams: one from Montreal I. to Île de la Visitation (west of the Papineau-Leblanc Bridge), which includes a footpath; another between Île de la Visitation and Île du Cheval de Terre; and the longest span between Île du Cheval-de-Terre and Île Jésus. Île de la Visitation is joined to Montreal by another two small bridges: a road bridge, which also serves as a dam (historically, a water mill) and a footbridge.

^{J} The railway crossing at Île Bigras consists of two spans, one north and one south of Île Bigras.

^{K} A structure known as "Île Bray Bridge" was abandoned while still under construction in favor of Île aux Tourtes Bridge.

^{L} Galipeault Bridge was first built in 1925 and doubled in 1964. Both spans have been replaced since. Taschereau Bridge, which was part of the same project, spans the West Channel along the same highway.
