= Bordeaux Railway Bridge =

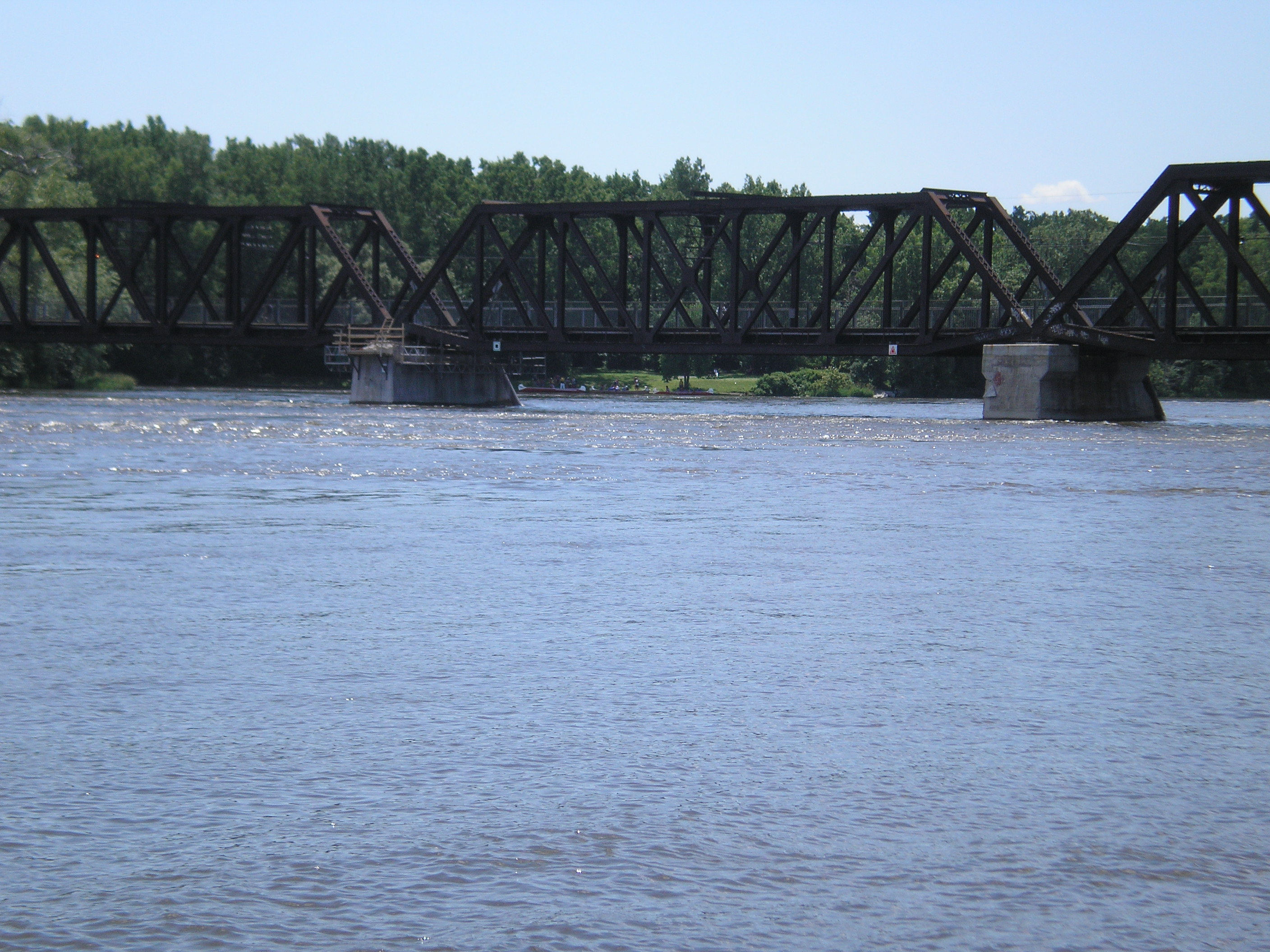
- The Bordeaux Railway Bridge as seen from downstream. The handrails of the footbridge can be seen on the far (upstream) side.
- Coordinates: 45.548205°N 73.699615°W
- Carries: CPKC, CFQG, Exo
- Crosses: Rivière des Prairies
- Locale: Montreal/Laval, Quebec, Canada
- Maintained by: Canadian Pacific Kansas City

Characteristics
- Clearance above: AAR
- Clearance below: (?)

Rail characteristics
- No. of tracks: 2 (gauntlet track)
- Track gauge: 1,435 mm (4 ft 8 1/2 in) standard gauge
- Structure gauge: AAR
- Electrified: No

Location
- Interactive map of Bordeaux Railway Bridge

The Bordeaux Railway Bridge is on the Canadian Pacific Kansas City line across the Rivière des Prairies between Ahuntsic-Cartierville (on Montreal Island) and Laval-des-Rapides (on Île Jésus) in Quebec, Canada. This railway bridge is used by freight trains of Canadian Pacific Kansas City (CPKC), the Chemins de Fer Québec-Gatineau (CFQG) and by Exo's Saint-Jérôme line.

A four-rail gauntlet track is used because the horizontal structure gauge is not sufficiently wide for a regular double track.

A bicycle/pedestrian bridge is cantilevered on the upstream (west) side of this bridge.

== Gallery ==
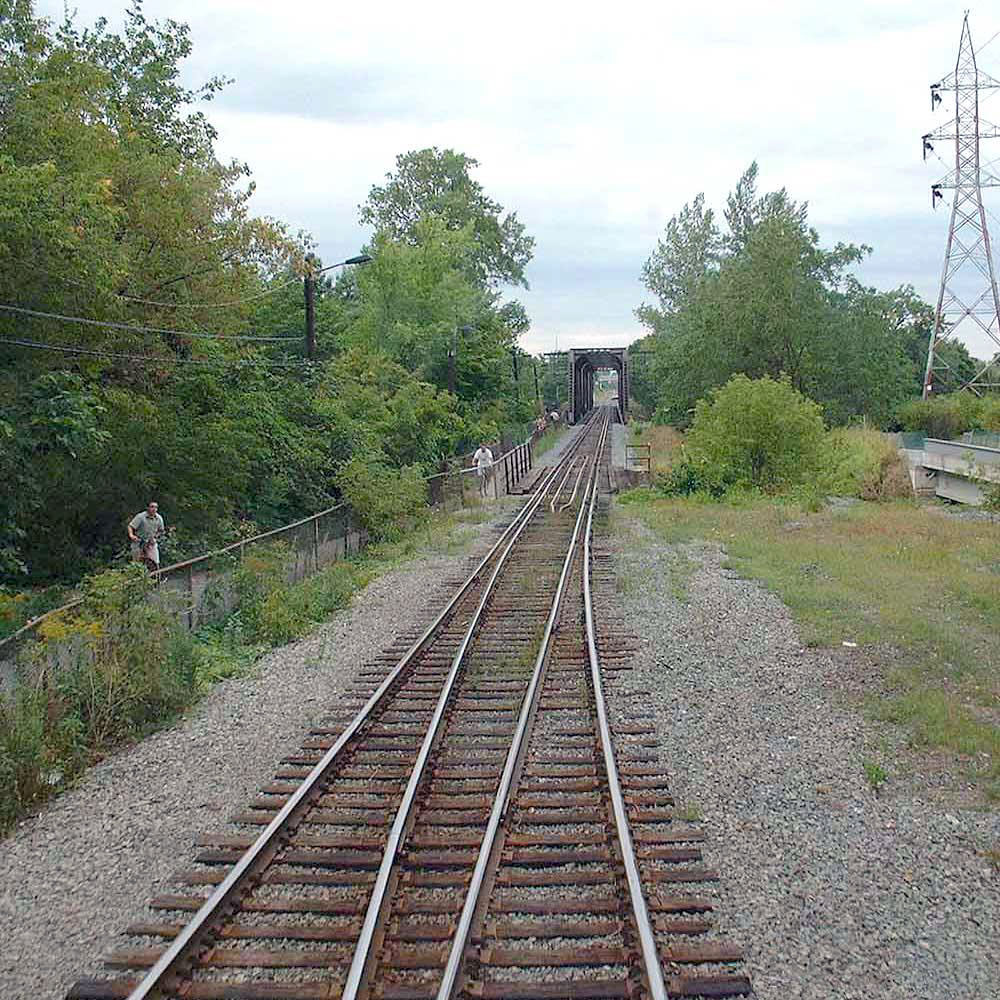
CPKC's Bordeaux Railway Bridge gauntlet track in Montreal, Quebec. The bridge is visible in the background. The bicycle trail (shared-use path) is visible to the left and the unnamed bridge to Perry Island is visible to the right.

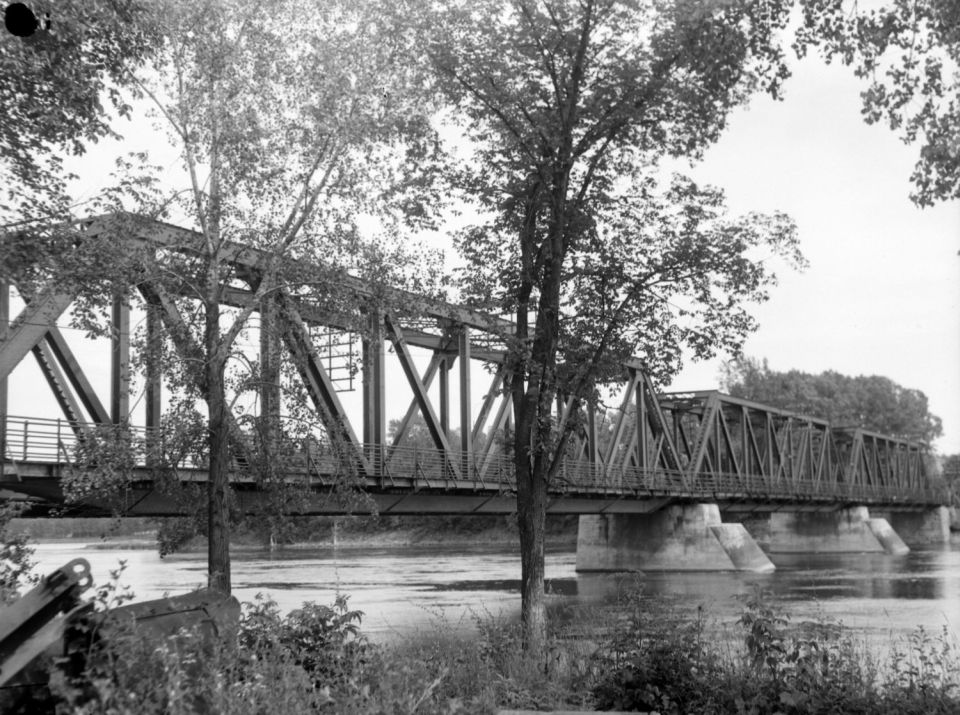
Bridge in 1948, as seen from upstream. The footbridge appears to be already in place.

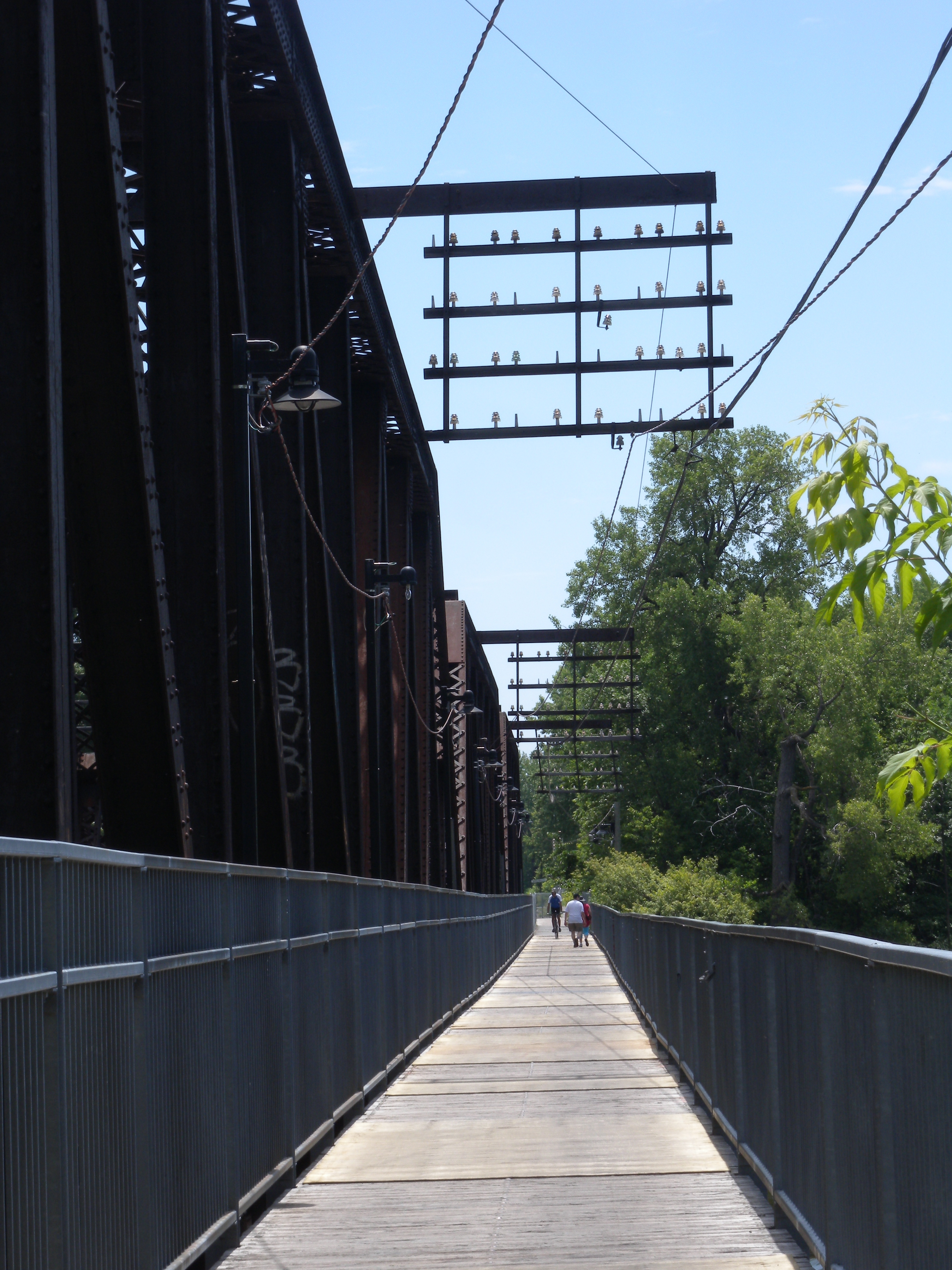
The bicycle bridge looking south towards Montreal.

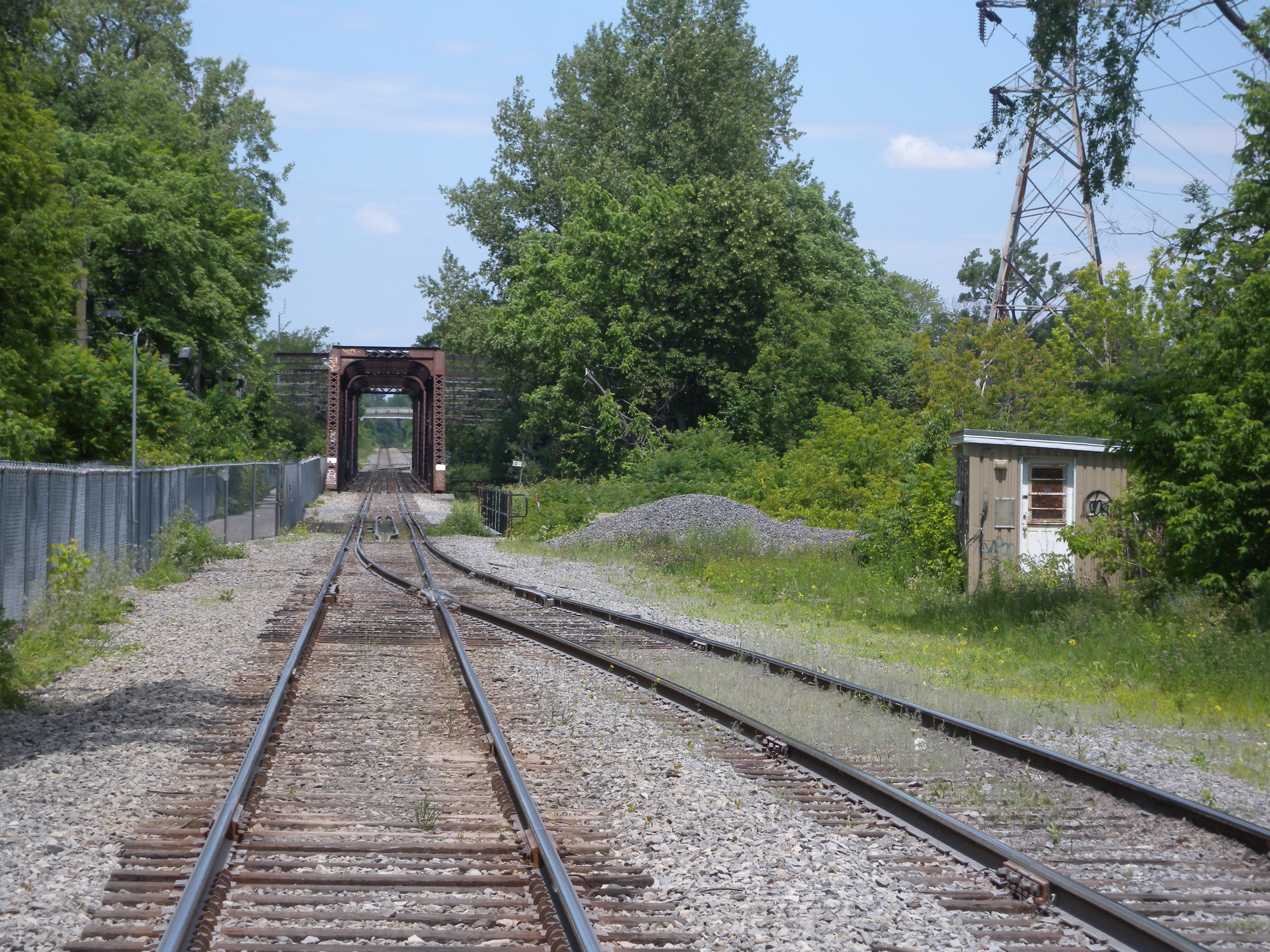
The gauntlet track seen from the south.

== See also ==
- List of bridges in Canada
- List of bridges spanning the Rivière des Prairies
- List of bridges in Montreal
- List of crossings of the Rivière des Prairies
- Route Verte 1 and 2
- Vélo Québec
