= Viau (disambiguation) =

Viau may refer to:

- Viau, a provincial electoral district in Quebec
- Viau (Montreal Metro), a station on the Montreal Metro (subway)

== People ==
- Caroline Viau Canadian para-alpine skier
- Fernand Viau, member of the Canadian House of Commons
- George Viau, French dentist and art collector
- Jacques Viau, Montreal lawyer
- Lee Viau, baseball player
- Roberto Viau, Argentinian basketball player
- Susana Viau (1944–2013), Argentinian journalist
- Théophile de Viau, French baroque poet and dramatist

== See also ==
- Pont Viau, a bridge in Quebec
- Pont-Viau, Quebec, a district of the city of Laval, Quebec
