= Laval-des-Rapides (disambiguation) =

Laval-des-Rapides may refer to:

- Laval-des-Rapides
- Laval-des-Rapides (provincial electoral district), a provincial district in Montreal
- Laval Centre, an abolished federal district, was known as Laval-des-Rapides between 1976 and 1990
