= Cartierville (disambiguation) =

Cartierville is a former city amalgamated into the City of Montreal, Quebec, Canada.

Cartierville may also refer to:

- Bordeaux-Cartierville, an arrondissement of Montreal
- Ahuntsic-Cartierville, an arrondissement of Montreal
- Saint-Laurent—Cartierville, now just Saint-Laurent, a federal electoral district in Quebec
- Cartierville Airport, a defunct airport in Saint-Laurent
- Cartierville Bridge or Lachapelle Bridge, over the Rivière des Prairies
