= Saint-Laurent Railway Bridge =

Bridge in Quebec

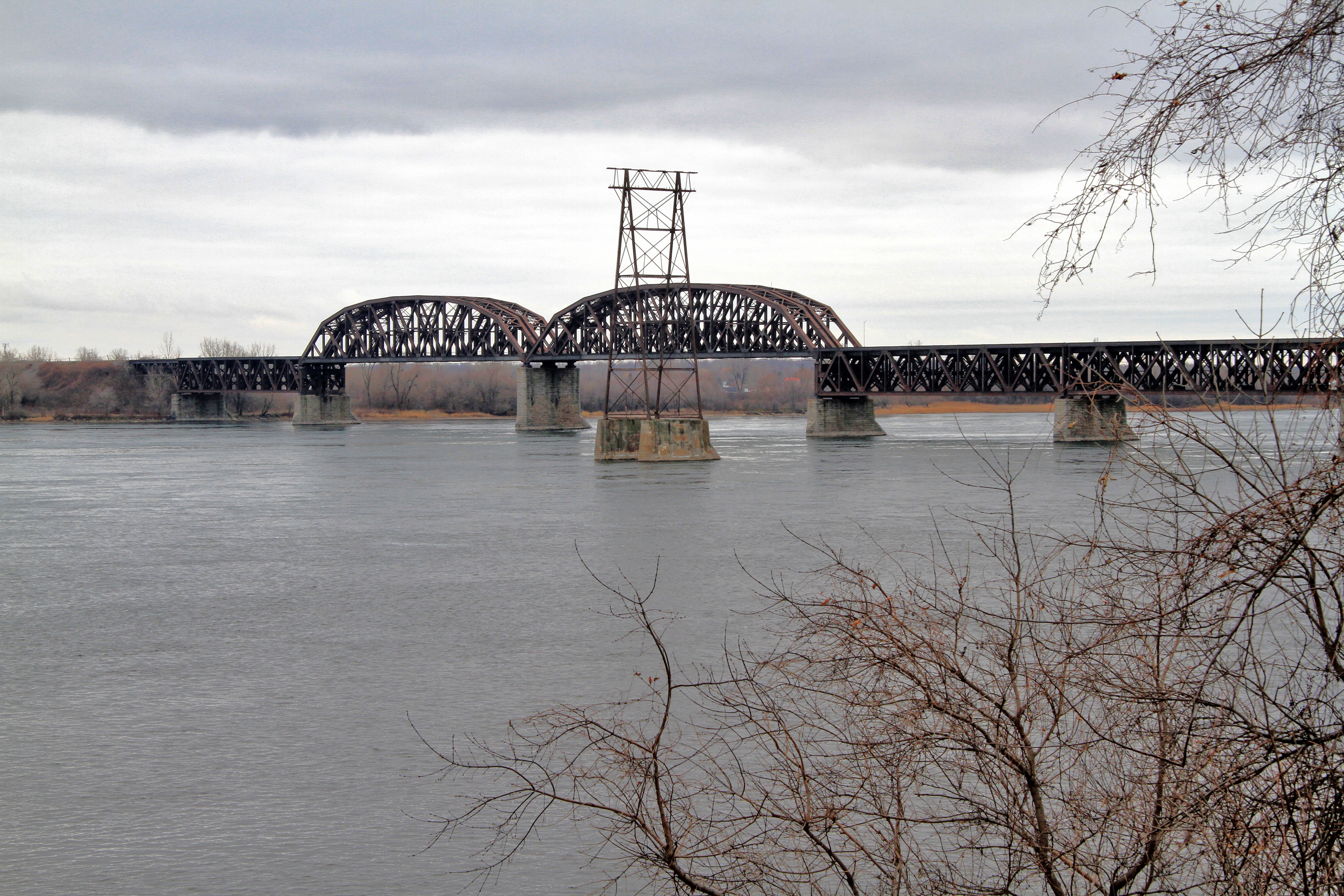
- The Saint-Laurent Railway Bridge as seen from the Monette-Lafleur bus terminal.
- Coordinates: 45°25′8″N 73°39′34″W
- Carries: Canadian Pacific Railway, Exo
- Crosses: St. Lawrence River and the Saint Lawrence Seaway
- Locale: Kahnawake, Quebec and Montreal, Quebec
- Official name: none

Characteristics
- Design: 2 Truss bridges, includes twin lift Bridges

Rail characteristics
- No. of tracks: 2, (1 per parallel spans)
- Track gauge: 4 ft 8 1/2 in (1,435 mm) standard gauge
- Structure gauge: AAR

Location
- Interactive map of Saint-Laurent Railway Bridge

The Saint-Laurent Railway Bridge is a Canadian Pacific railway bridge linking LaSalle to the Kahnawake Mohawk Reserve, just upstream of the Mercier Bridge. It is used by the Exo Candiac commuter train.

== History of the bridge ==
Two bridges have crossed the river at this location. The first bridge, erected in 1885–1887, was of all-steel construction that employed a flying cantilever design to cross the main channel. It carried a single track and was opened for passenger service at the end of July, 1887.

The second structure, the one standing today, was constructed between 1910 and 1913 and was completed by November 13, 1913. To build the bridge, the free ends of the main spans were floated across the water on a barge. Construction of the new bridge was completed while keeping the old bridge in service. Extra piers were added and the design changed significantly.

Construction of the Saint Lawrence Seaway required the construction of twin vertical lift bridges replacing the existing fixed spans. This section has two elevator winches (functioning as a drawbridge) able to lift the section up to 70 feet (21 metres) above the initial level, in order to allow ships to pass.

== Gallery ==
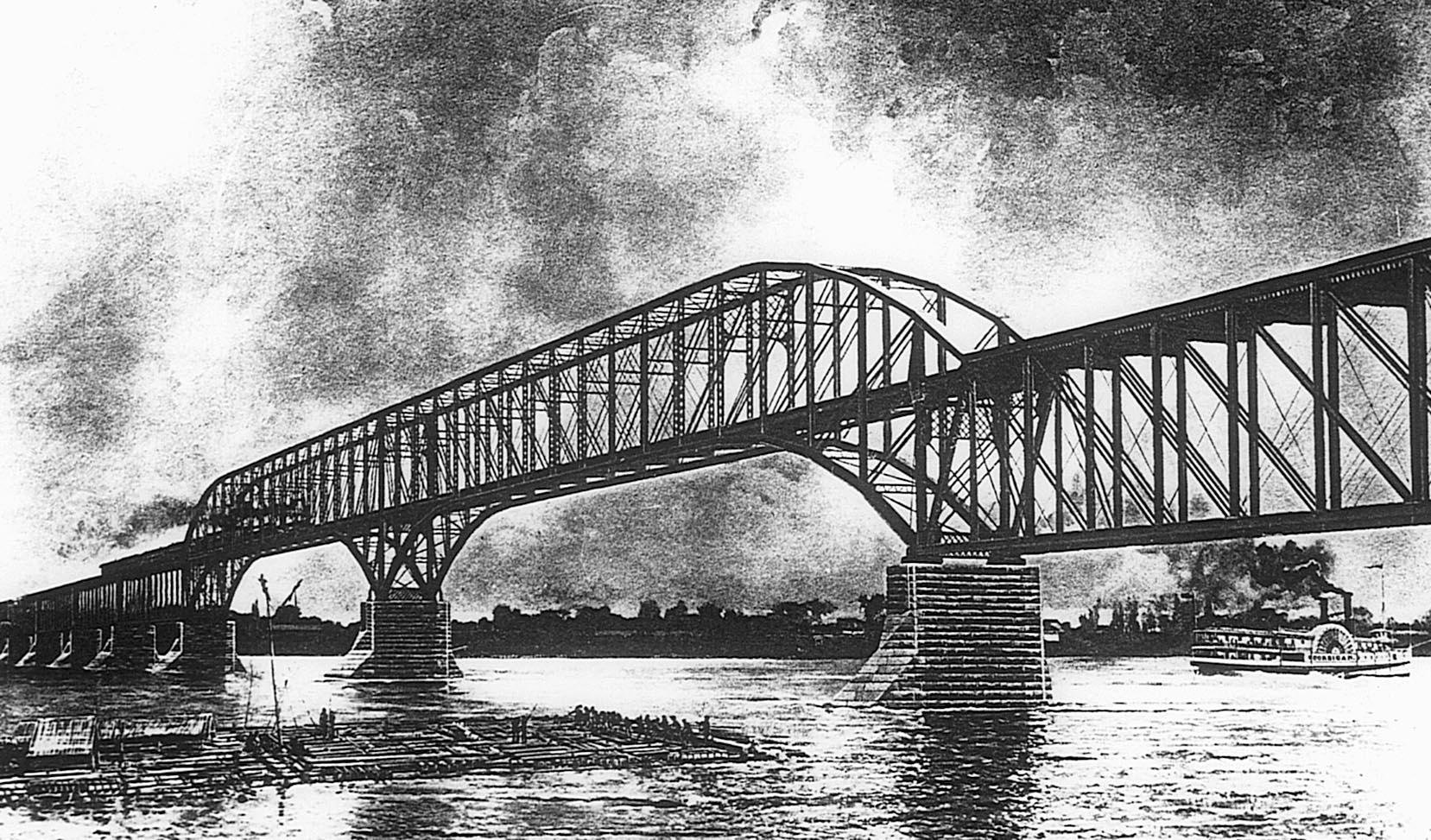
1885 bridge

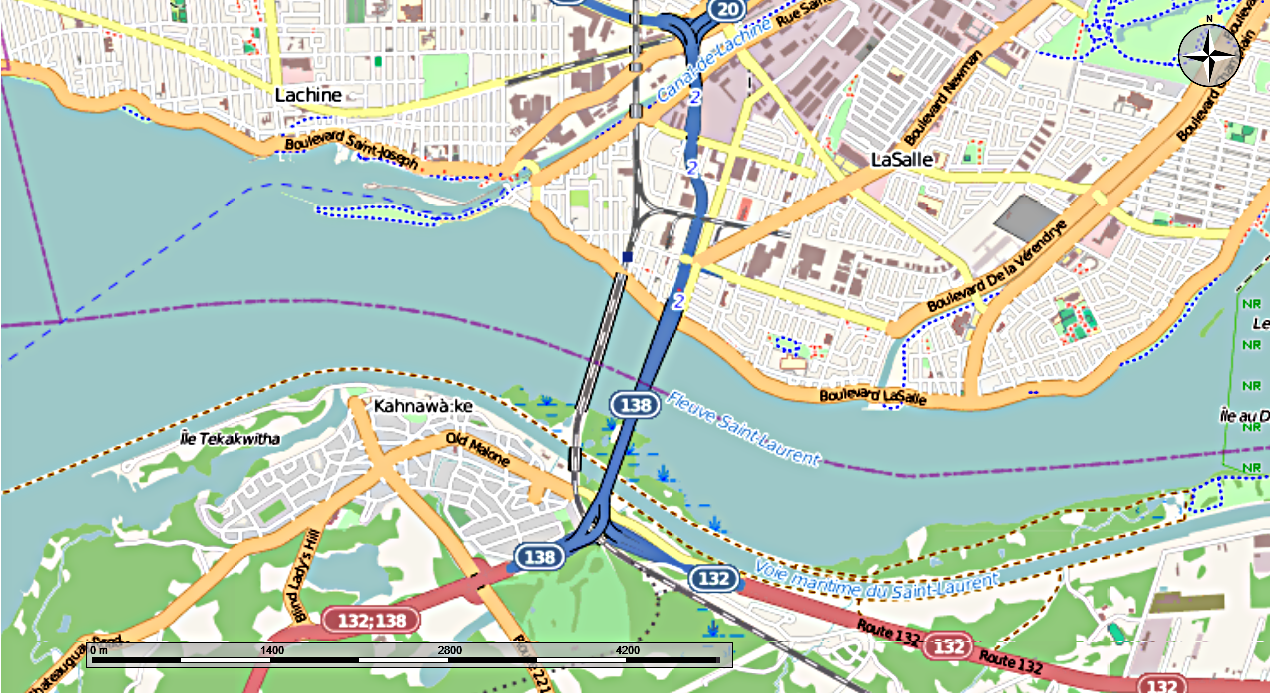
Map showing the rail bridge, on the left

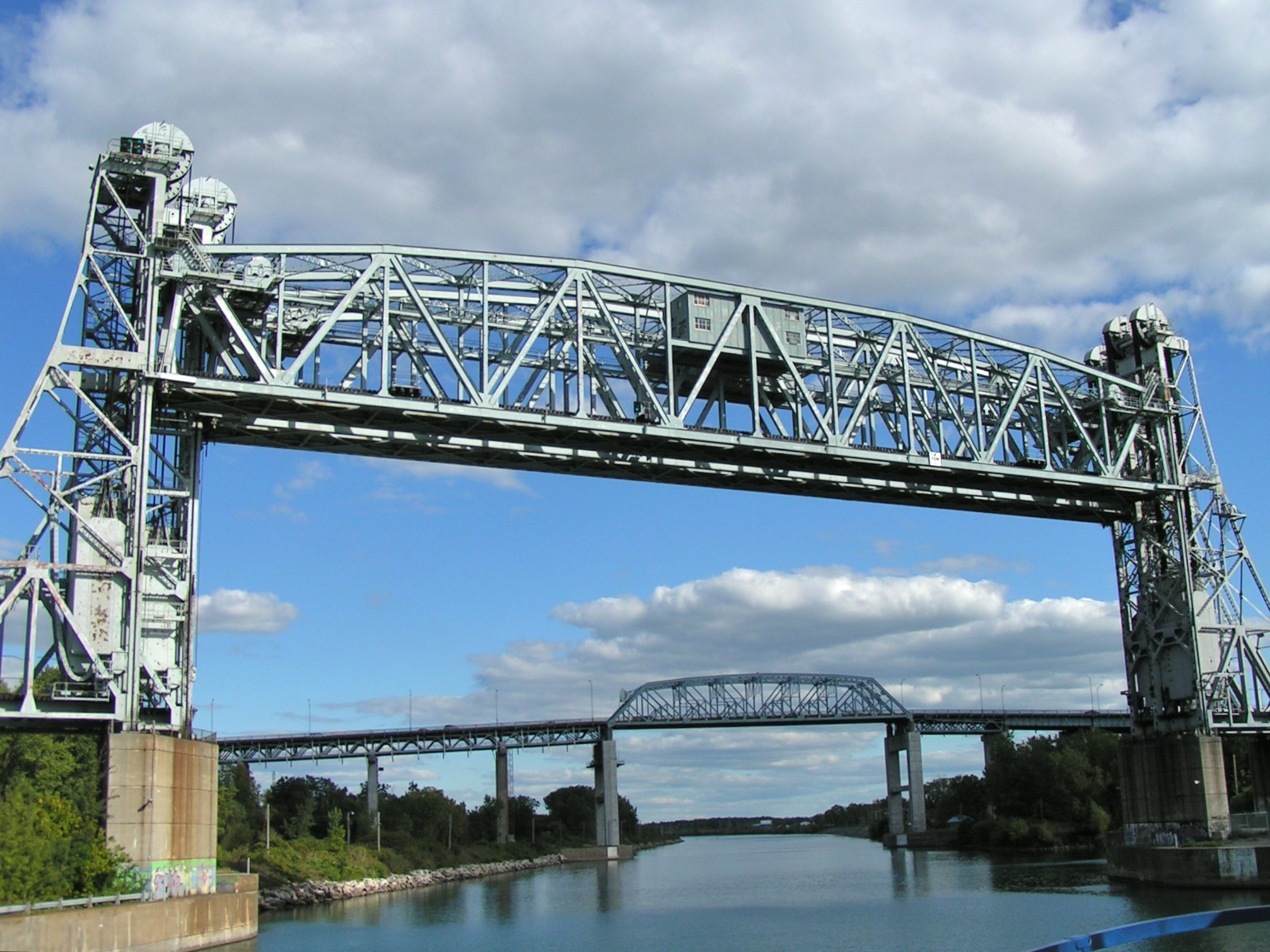
Located only about 400 m (1,312 ft) south of the St-Laurent Railway Bridge, on the same line, is a pair of vertical-lift bridges to carry the rail line over the Saint Lawrence Seaway

== See also ==
- List of crossings of the Saint Lawrence River
- List of bridges in Montreal
- List of bridges in Canada
