= Le Gardeur Bridge =

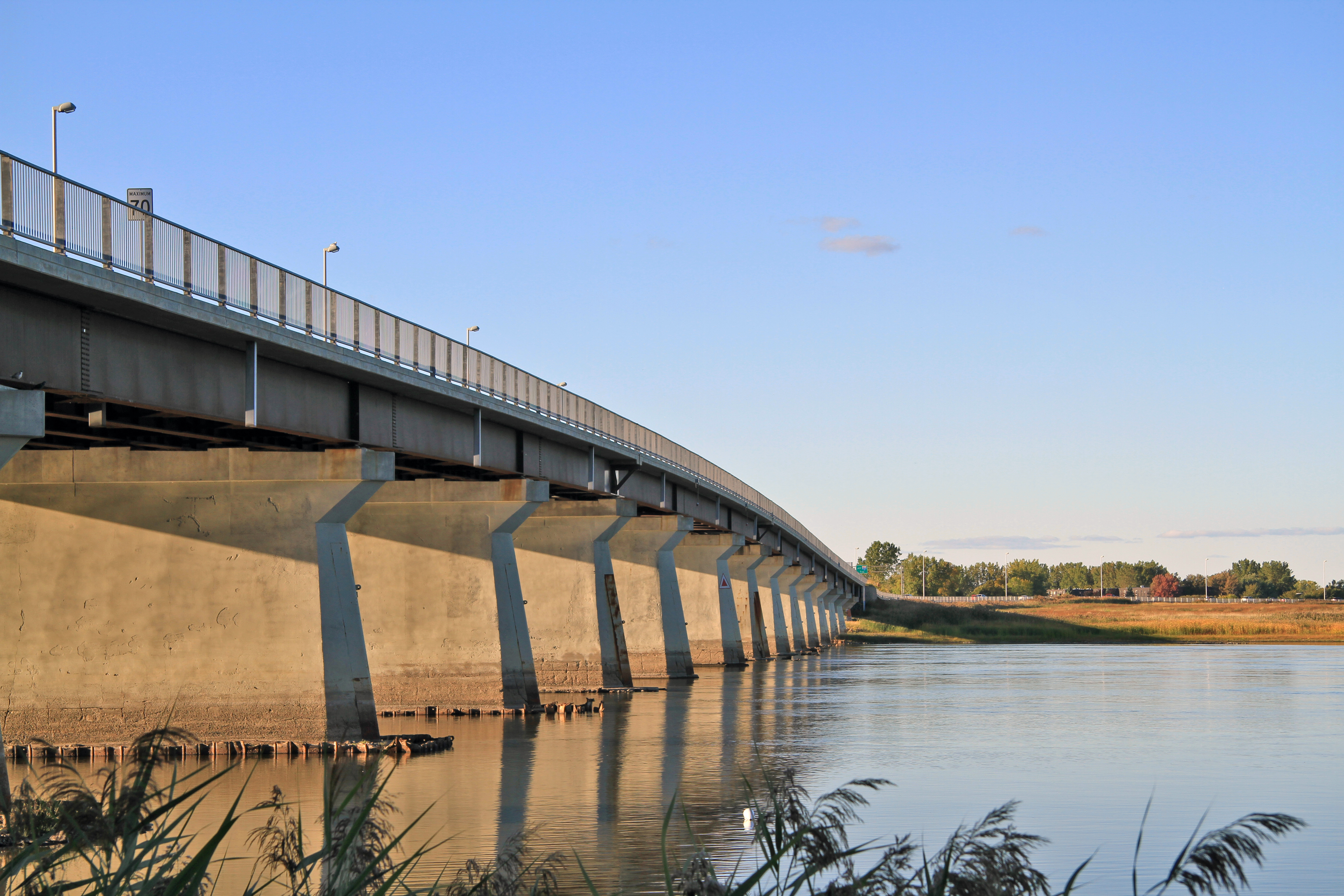
- Coordinates: 45°42′13″N 73°29′1″W
- Carries: Route 138, Notre-Dame Street
- Crosses: Rivière des Prairies
- Locale: Montreal (Rivière-des-Prairies–Pointe-aux-Trembles)
- Official name: Pont Le Gardeur
- Maintained by: Transports Québec

Characteristics
- Clearance below: (?)

Location
- Interactive map of Le Gardeur Bridge

The Le Gardeur Bridge is a beam bridge that connects the east end of the island of Montreal, in Pointe-aux-Trembles, to Repentigny.

The bridge has two sections across the Rivière des Prairies, which are separated by Île Bourdon. The length of the structures is 297 metres (974 ft) (west) and 565 metres (1,854 ft) (east).

Built in 1939, the bridge underwent a major reconstruction in 2001 as well as the addition of a reserved lane for the Metrobus on the eastern structure. The work included the demolition, reconstruction and widening of the bridge deck, which included the new transit lane, and its approaches as well as the rehabilitation of the 24 pillars. The Ministry of Transport also made emergency repairs in 1999 to solidify the structure, and frequent inspections were made between 1999 and the reconstruction of the bridge, which was estimated at over $26 million.

The bridge is part of Quebec Route 138, which runs from the Canada–United States border southwest of Huntingdon to the Côte-Nord region via Trois-Rivières and Quebec City. It is one of only two river crossings at the eastern tip of Montreal to the Lanaudière region (Repentigny, Charlemagne and Lavaltrie areas), the other being the Charles de Gaulle Bridge on Quebec Autoroute 40. This section of Route 138 is named Notre-Dame Street, and the eastern end of the bridge also marks the start of the Chemin du Roy, a portion of Route 138 that follows the historic road to Quebec City.

Each day, approximatively 20,000 vehicles use the bridge, which is an alternative route to the more congested Charles de Gaulle Bridge during rush hours. The road has two lanes of traffic in each direction, together with sidewalks and a bicycle lane/path. On both sides of the bridge, it is known as Rue Notre-Dame but immediately after crossing the bridge, westbound Route 138 turns into Sherbrooke Street via a new roundabout through most of the eastern half of the island, including Downtown Montreal.

A railway bridge used for Via Rail train service is just west of Pierre Le Gardeur Bridge.

The bridge is named after Pierre Legardeur (1600–1648), a New France general and the first lord of Repentigny.

== See also ==
- List of bridges in Canada
- List of bridges spanning the Rivière des Prairies
- List of crossings of the Rivière des Prairies
