= Charles-De Gaulle Bridge =

Charles de Gaulle Bridge
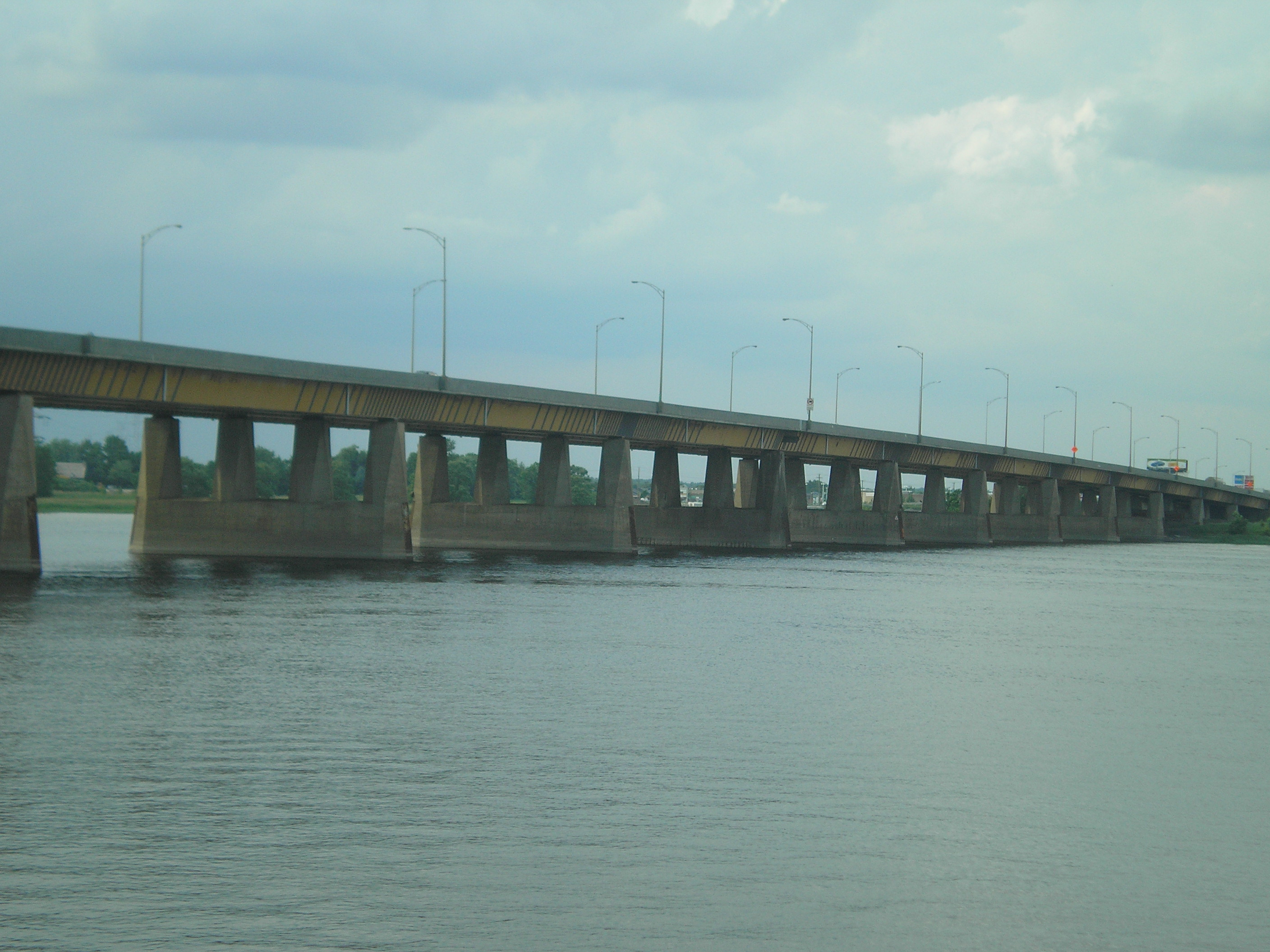
- Coordinates: 45°42′7″N 73°30′32″W
- Carries: Quebec Autoroute 40
- Crosses: Rivière des Prairies
- Locale: between Montreal and Terrebonne
- Official name: Pont Charles de Gaulle
- Maintained by: Transports Québec

History
- Opened: 1967

Location
- Interactive map of Charles de Gaulle Bridge

The Charles de Gaulle Bridge is a bridge that links the eastern tip of the island of Montreal, Quebec over the Rivière des Prairies to the Lanaudière region near the city of Charlemagne. Inaugurated in 1967, the bridge took its current name in 1985 to mark the fifteenth anniversary of the death of French President Charles de Gaulle.

The bridge is part of Quebec Autoroute 40 and is only one of two bridge crossings from Montreal to the Repentigny-Charlemagne region, the other being Pierre Le Gardeur Bridge, on Notre-Dame Street. As being by far the fastest link to Downtown Montreal, the road is often very congested during rush hours, with traffic backing up as far as Repentigny in the morning with heavy congestion eastbound during the afternoon. The bridge is also part of the fastest travel link between Montreal and the cities of Trois-Rivières and Quebec City, both on the northern shores of the Saint Lawrence River.

The bridge has three lanes of traffic in each direction. The six-lane segment on A-40 eastbound continues until after the Quebec Autoroute 640 junction.

== See also ==
- List of bridges in Canada
- List of bridges in Quebec
- List of bridges spanning the Rivière des Prairies
- List of crossings of the Rivière des Prairies
