= Médéric-Martin Bridge =

Bridge over the Rivière des Prairies in Quebec, Canada

Médéric Martin Bridge
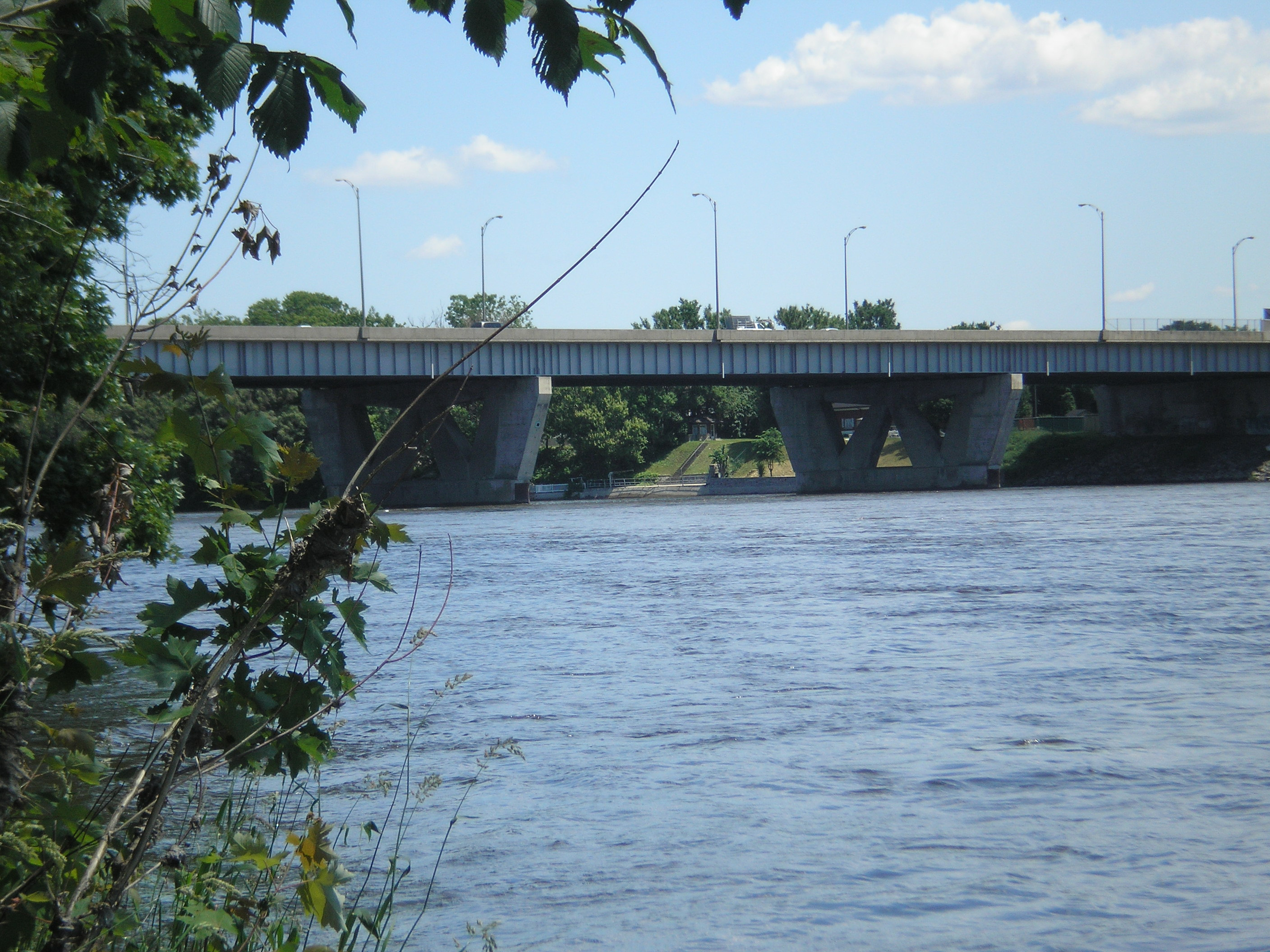
- Coordinates: 45°32′24.7″N 73°42′43.9″W
- Carries: Quebec Autoroute 15/Trans-Canada Highway
- Crosses: Rivière des Prairies
- Locale: Montreal, Quebec
- Maintained by: Transports Québec

Statistics
- Daily traffic: 163,000 (2004)

Location
- Interactive map of Médéric Martin Bridge

Médéric Martin Bridge is a viaduct-type bridge in Quebec, Canada that spans Rivière des Prairies between Montreal and Laval. It carries 8 lanes of Quebec Autoroute 15, including 1 reserved bus and carpooling lanes.

It was named after Médéric Martin, who was a Member of Parliament for St. Mary, then Mayor of Montreal. He was a resident of what is now Laval during his tenure as Mayor.

== See also ==
- List of bridges in Canada
- List of bridges in Montreal
- List of crossings of the Rivière des Prairies
