= Réseau express vélo =

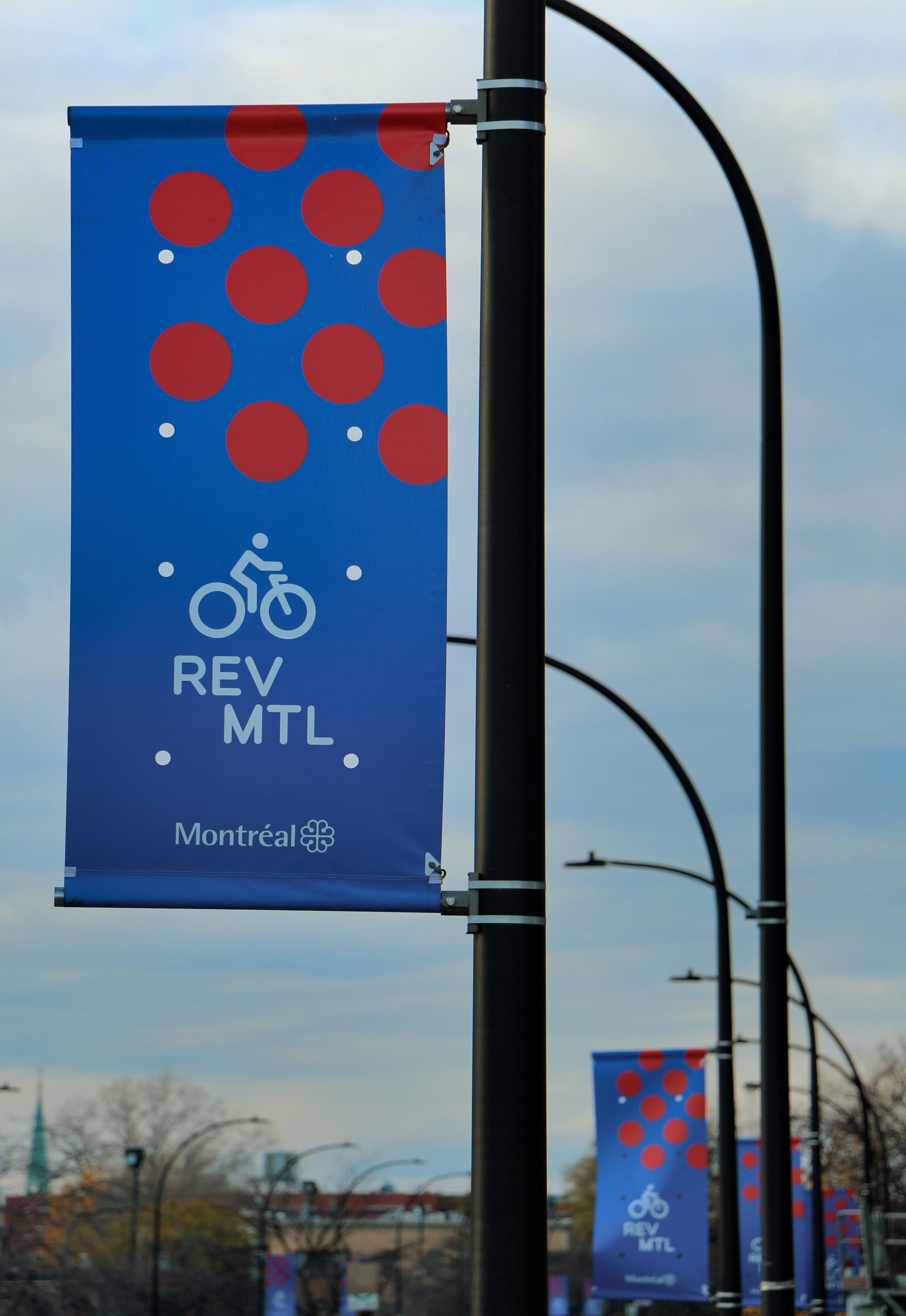
- Signs above the REV on rue Saint-Denis
- Length: 191 km (119 mi)
- Use: cycling
- Website: City website

REV plan
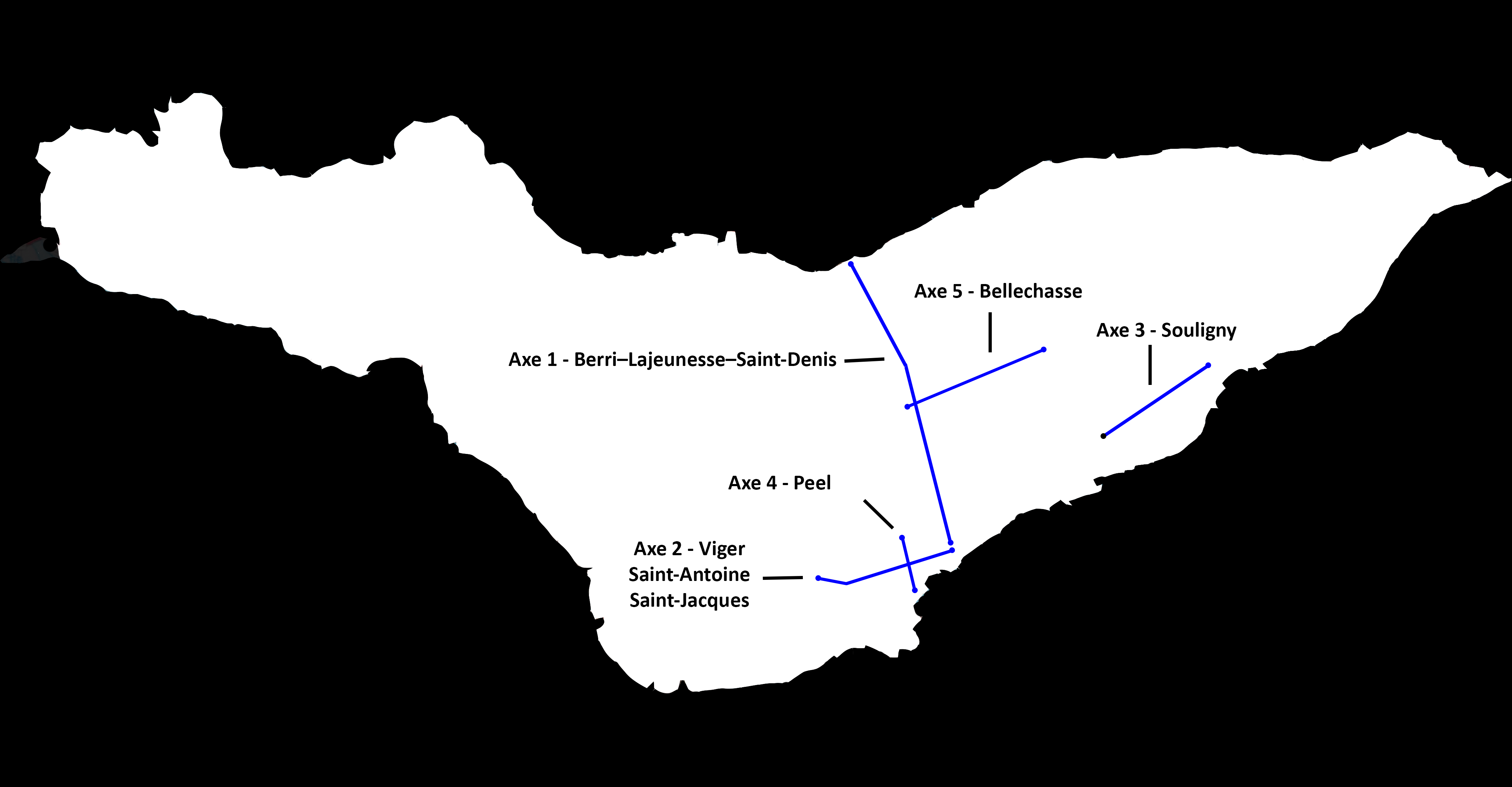
- The five initial axes of the REV

The Réseau express vélo (REV, lit. 'Express bike network') is a network of bike lanes under development in Montreal, Quebec, Canada. The project consists of 17 routes spanning 191 kilometres (119 mi) of protected bike lanes to be made available year-round. Announced in 2019 by mayor Valérie Plante, the first section of the REV along rue Saint-Denis was inaugurated on November 7, 2020. The current plan was announced in 2023 as part of "Vision Vélo 2023–2027". The six completed axes are:

- Berri / La Jeunesse / Saint-Denis
- Viger / St-Antoine / Saint-Jacques
- Souligny
- Peel
- Bellechasse
- Notre-Dame / Parc de la Traversée

The main north-south axis of the REV runs along Saint-Denis, Berri, and Bellechasse streets and saw rapid adoption. In 2021, it was one of the most popular north-south cycling routes in the city. The intersection of Saint-Denis and rue des Carrières saw over a million annual riders in 2021, and in 2023 it reached over 1.5 million.

== See also ==
- Bordeaux Railway Bridge
