= Pie-IX Bridge =

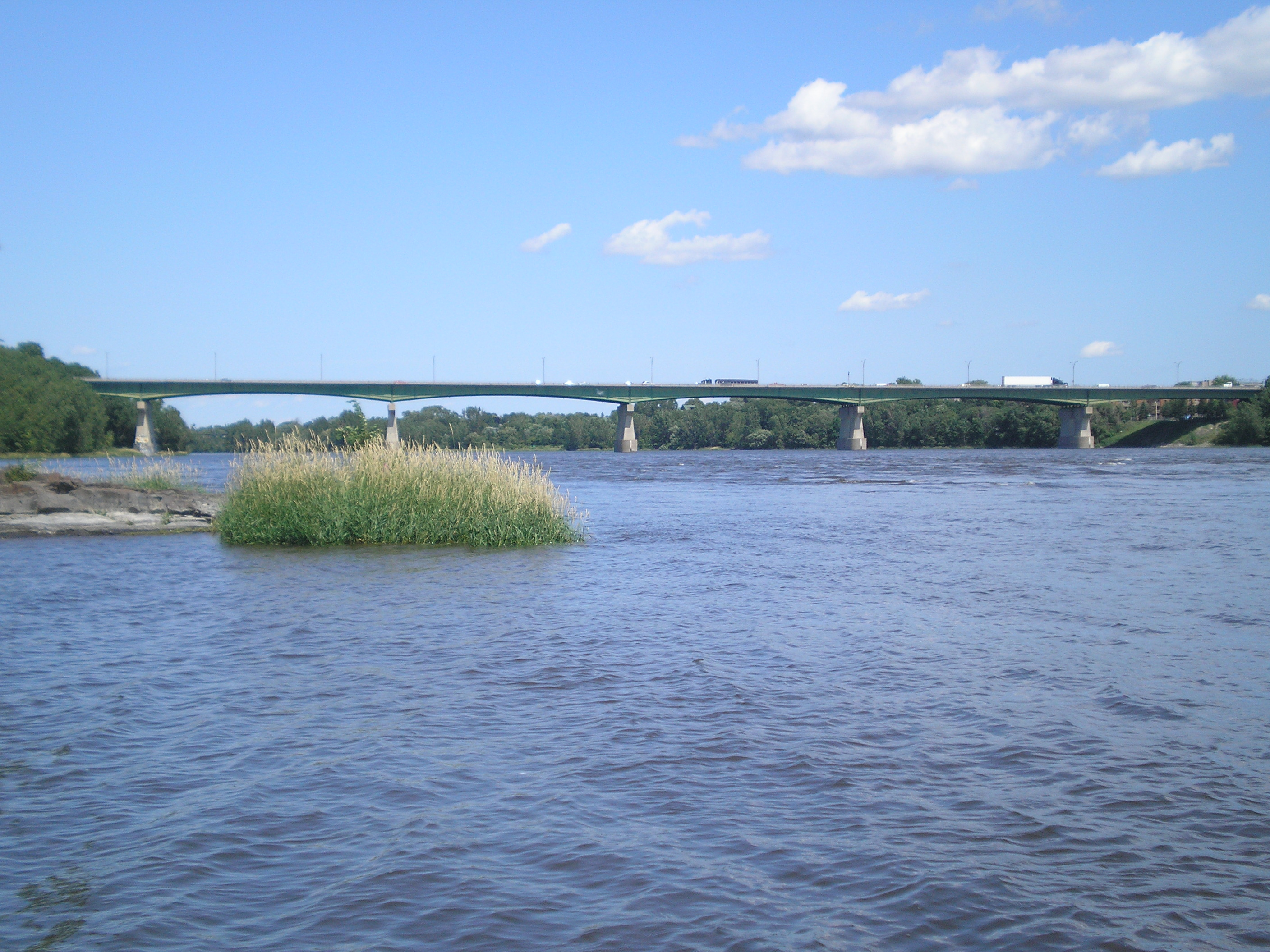
- Pie-IX is currently the second easternmost bridge connecting Laval to the Island of Montreal.
- Coordinates: 45°35′57″N 73°38′48″W
- Carries: 6 lanes of Route 125
- Crosses: Rivière des Prairies
- Locale: Laval, Quebec and Montreal, Quebec, Canada
- Other name: Le Caron Bridge
- Maintained by: Transports Québec

History
- Opened: 1937 (rebuilt 1967)

Statistics
- Daily traffic: 83,000 (2013)

Location
- Interactive map of Pie-IX Bridge

Pie-IX Bridge (French: Pont Pie-IX) is a bridge in Quebec, spanning the Rivière des Prairies. It connects the Saint-Vincent-de-Paul area of Laval, on Île Jésus, and the borough of Montréal-Nord in Montreal, on the Island of Montreal. The bridge was part of Autoroute 25 until the construction of the new toll bridge for Autoroute 25. It is now part of Quebec Route 125.

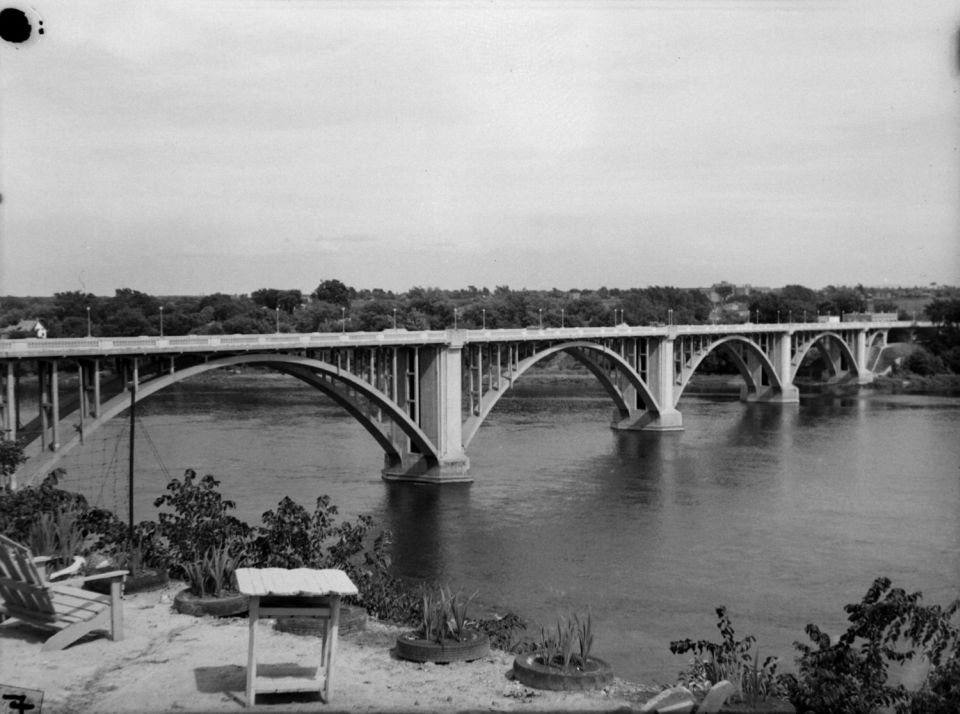
Pie-IX Bridge in 1948.

While it was originally called Le Caron Bridge, after Joseph Le Caron, an early missionary to the Hurons, the bridge has since been renamed Pie-IX Bridge, after Pie-IX Boulevard. The Boulevard itself was named after Pope Pius IX (Pie is the French name for Pius).

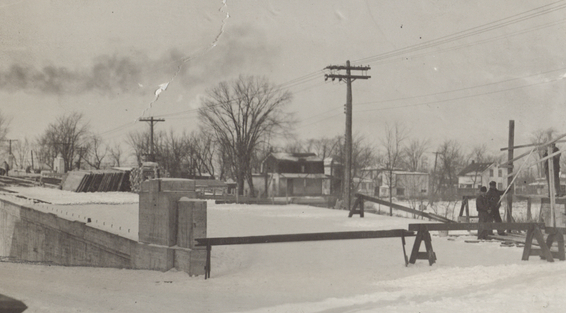
Pont Pie-IX being built

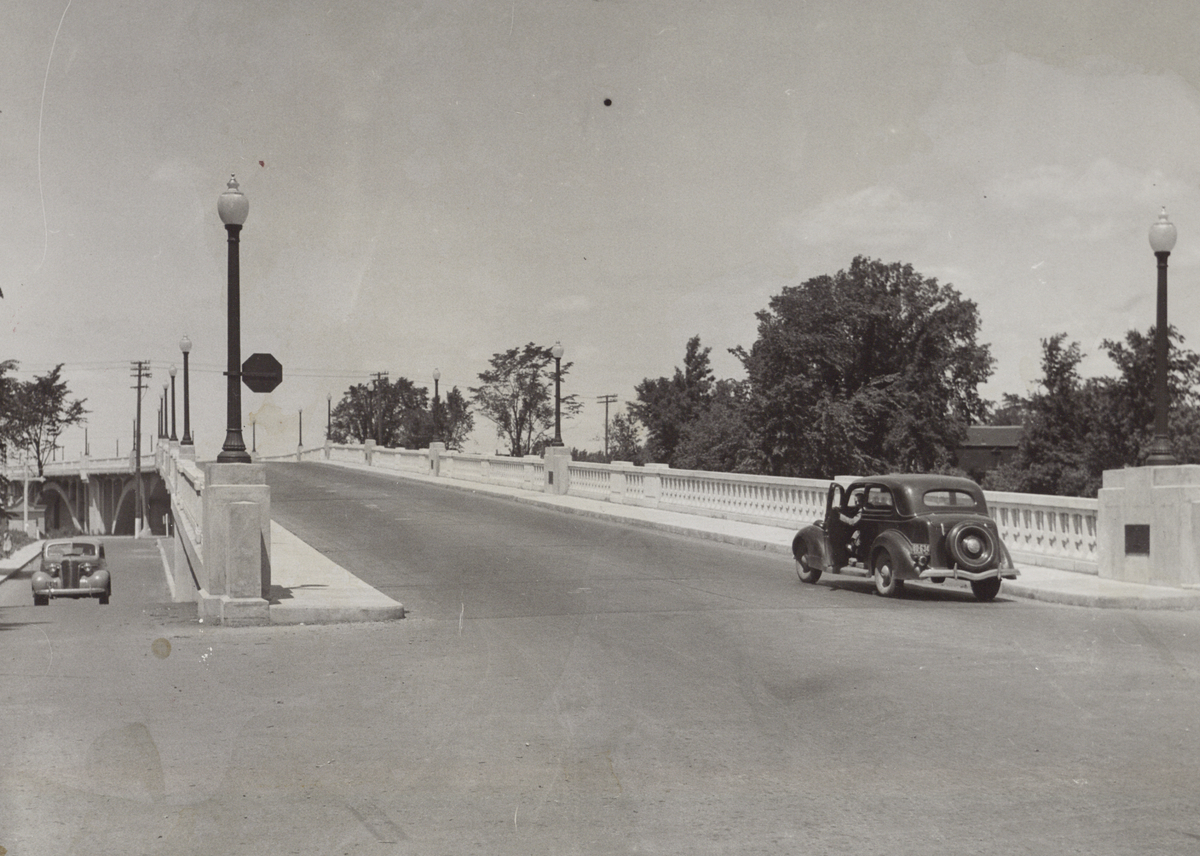
Pont Pie-IX in 1939

== See also ==
- List of bridges spanning the Rivière des Prairies
- List of crossings of the Rivière des Prairies
- List of bridges in Montreal
- List of bridges in Canada
