= Lachapelle Bridge =

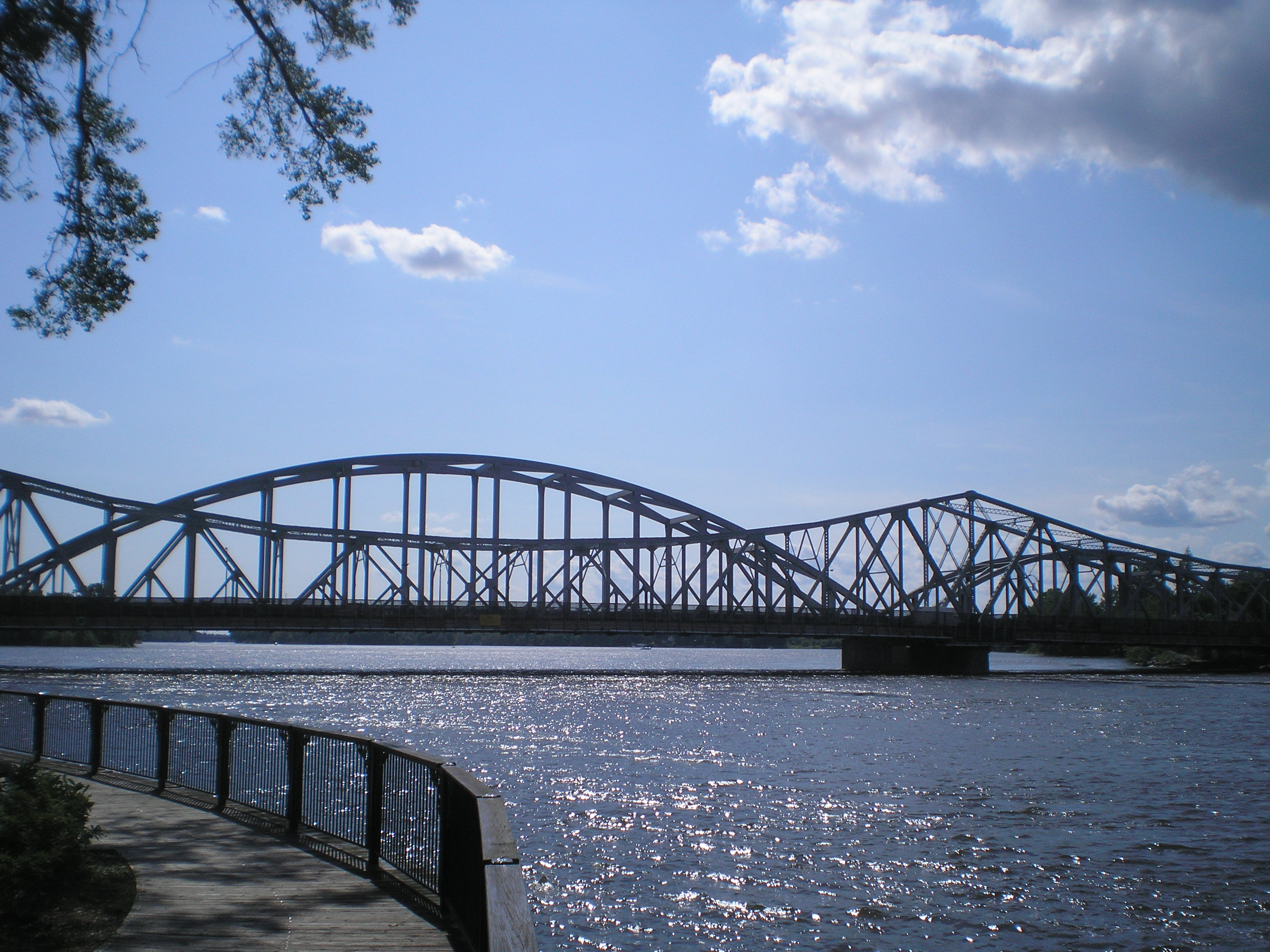
- The twin spans of Lachapelle Bridge, seen from the Montreal (down stream) side.
- Coordinates: 45°31′58″N 73°43′41″W
- Carries: 6 lanes of Route 117 (3 lanes per span)
- Crosses: Rivière des Prairies
- Locale: Montreal and Laval
- Maintained by: The city of Laval

Characteristics
- Total length: 262.43 metres (861 ft)
- Width: 15.5 metres (51 ft) (northbound)

History
- Opened: May 24, 1930 (northbound); 1975 (southbound)

Statistics
- Daily traffic: 38,000 (2013)

Location
- Interactive map of Lachapelle Bridge

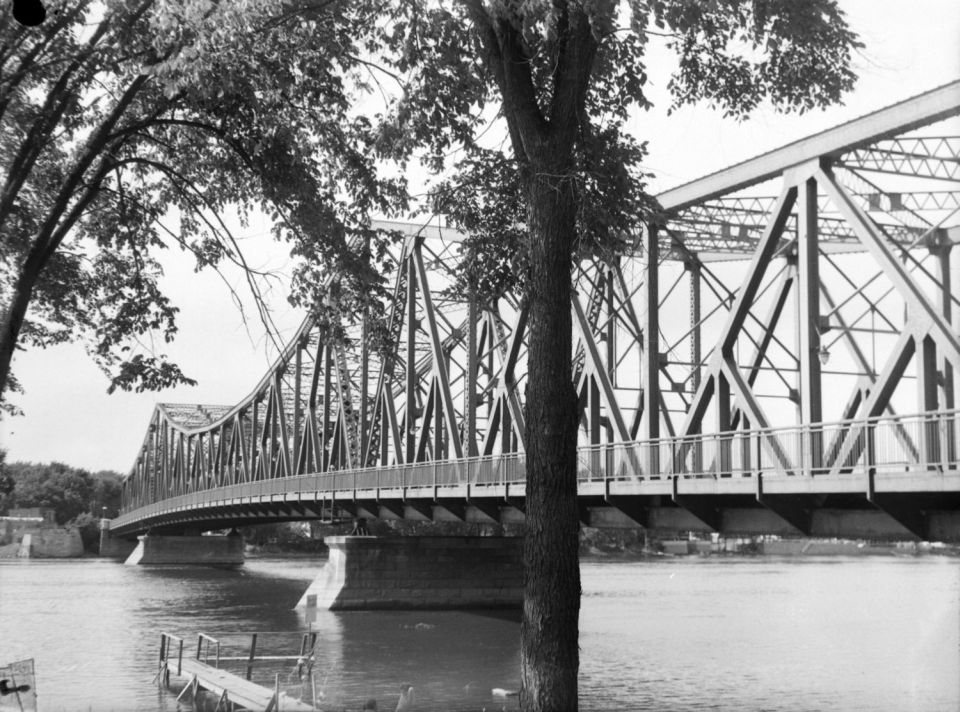
Older bridge in 1948

Lachapelle Bridge (French: Pont Lachapelle, pronounced [pɔ̃ laʃapɛl]), also known as Cartierville Bridge, is a road bridge that connects Montreal (Ahuntsic-Cartierville borough) to Laval by spanning the Rivière des Prairies.

This bridge spans the Rivière des Prairies between the Montreal borough of Ahuntsic-Cartierville and the Laval (Île Jésus) neighbourhood of Chomedey.

Actually there are two bridges, side by side and parallel:

The older (1930) three lane span, on the down stream side, carries the traffic north into Laval.

The newer (1975) three lane span, on the up stream side, carries the traffic south into Montreal.

Except for the length and the distance between the piers, the two spans are not identical.

A wooden bridge was originally built there in 1836, replaced by a steel one, built in 1882.

== See also ==
- List of bridges in Canada
- List of bridges spanning the Rivière des Prairies
- List of crossings of the Rivière des Prairies
