= Viau Bridge =

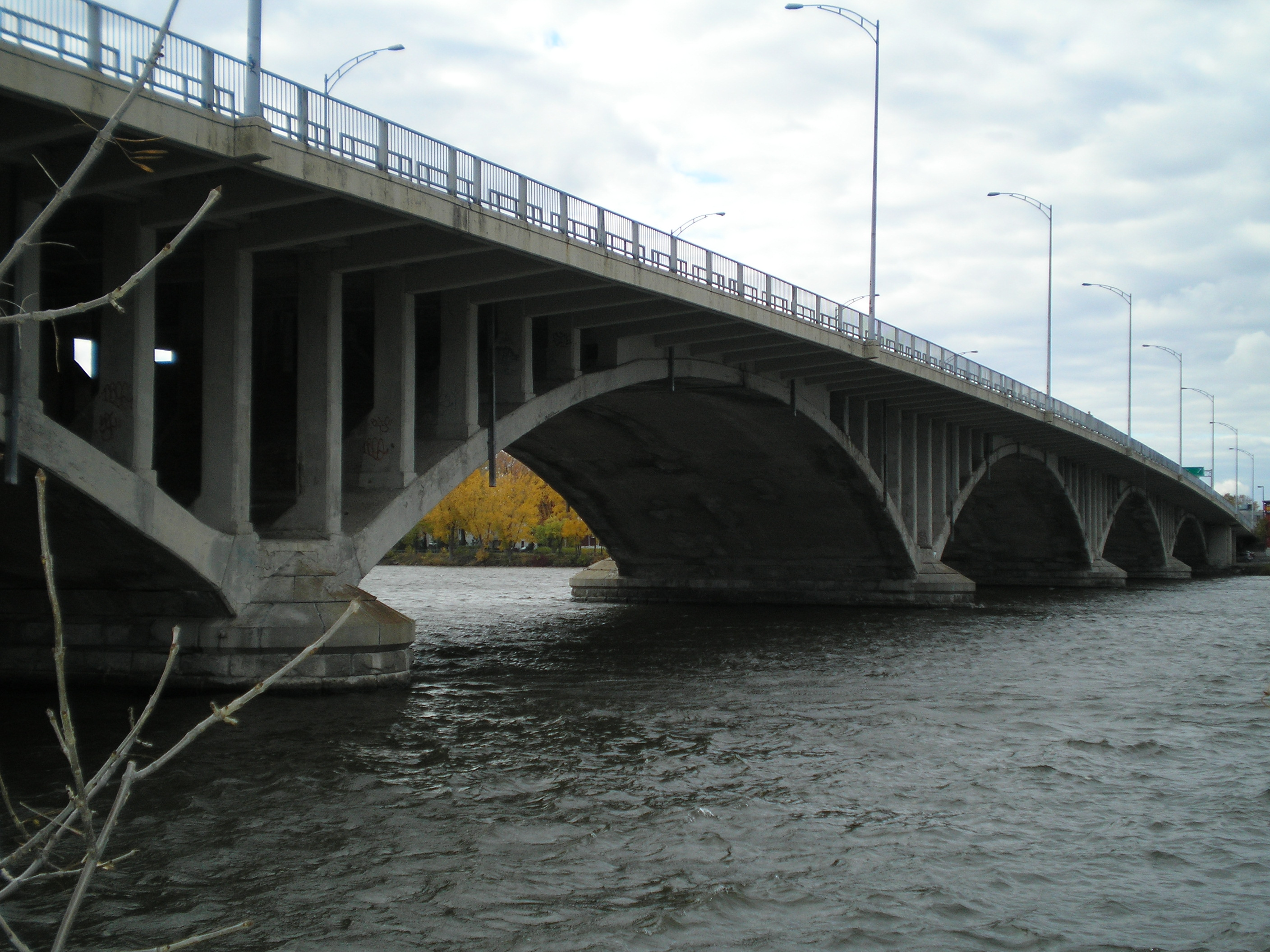
- Viau Bridge, seen from a bike trail in Montreal, Quebec.
- Coordinates: 45°33′26″N 73°40′32″W
- Carries: 4 lanes of Route 335 and one bus lane
- Crosses: Rivière des Prairies
- Locale: Laval, Quebec and Montreal, Quebec, Canada
- Official name: Pont Viau
- Other name: Pont Ahuntsic (Ahuntsic Bridge)
- Maintained by: Transports Québec

Characteristics
- Design: Concrete arch bridge

History
- Opened: 1962

Statistics
- Daily traffic: 36,000 (2013)

Location
- Interactive map of Viau Bridge

The Viau Bridge (officially in French: Pont Viau; formerly called the Ahuntsic Bridge, French: Pont Ahuntsic) was built in 1930, rebuilt in 1962 and widened in 1993.

The bridge spans the Rivière des Prairies between the Montreal borough of Ahuntsic-Cartierville and the Laval neighbourhood of Pont Viau. It is part of Route 335. About 36,000 drivers cross the bridge each weekday. The Société de transport de Laval has a designated bus lane for one of its bus routes heading south towards Henri-Bourassa Terminus Nord and the Henri-Bourassa station and north towards Cartier station. The Orange Line (Line 2) of the Montreal Metro that was extended in 2007 northward to Laval is backed up with the bus route of the same number. On August 8, 2007, a large hole and crack in the bus-only lane near the Laurentian Boulevard (Laval) side of the bridge brought a complete closure, but an inspection concluded that the bridge had no structural problems or damage and was reopened the same day.

A wooden bridge was built there in 1847.

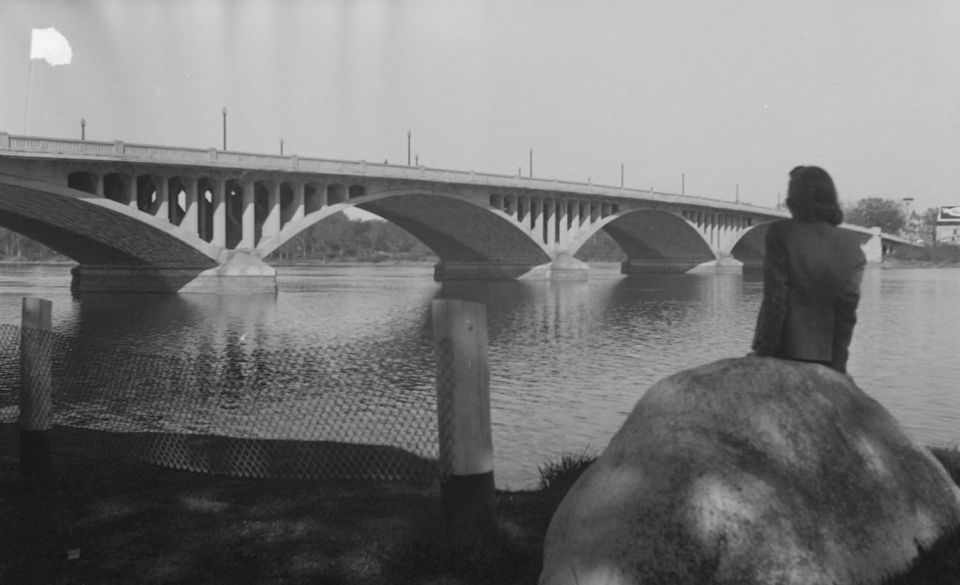
in 1941

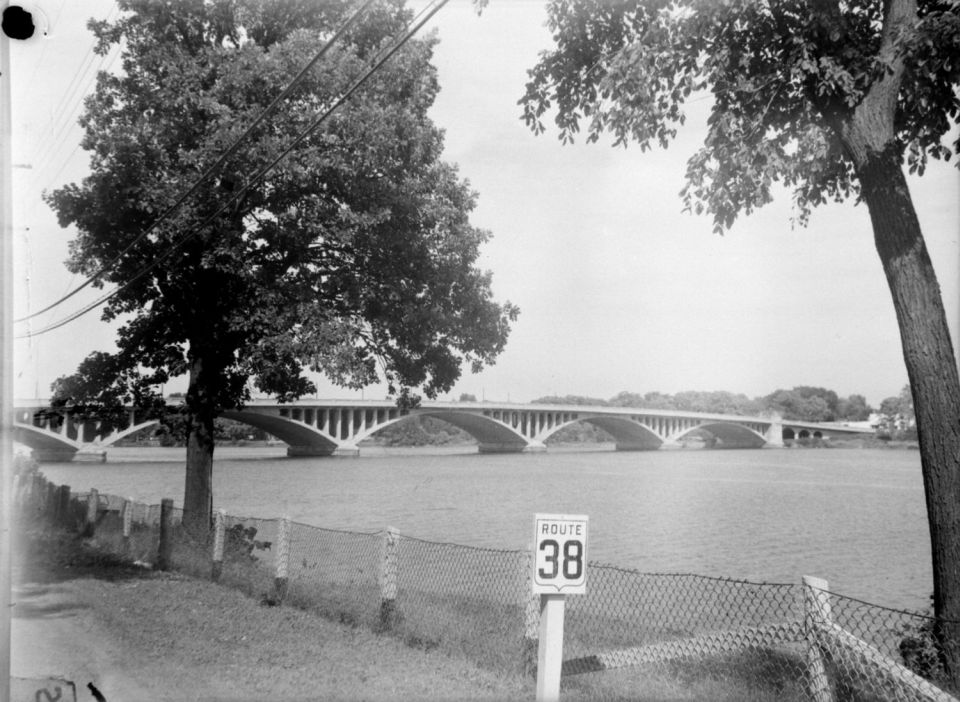
in 1948

== See also ==
- List of bridges in Canada
- List of bridges spanning the Rivière des Prairies
- List of bridges in Montreal
- List of crossings of the Rivière des Prairies
