= Route verte =

The Route verte (French for "Green Route," or "Greenway") is a network of bicycling and multiuse trails and designated roads, lanes, and surfaces in Quebec, Canada. The trail network inaugurated on August 10, 2007, and spans 5,034 kilometres (3,128 mi) as of 31 October 2013. It includes both urban trails (for example, in and around the city of Montreal) and cycling routes into quite isolated areas in the north, as well as along both sides of the Saint Lawrence River, out to the Gaspésie region, and on the Magdalen Islands, linking more than 320 municipalities along the way. The Route Verte is not entirely composed of trails, as nearly 61% of the network actually consists of on-road surfaces, whether regular roads with little traffic, wide shoulders, special lanes on highways, or otherwise. The segregated trails are mostly rail trails shared-use with hikers and other users.

== Routes ==
Route Number	Regions Served	Main Cities Served	Existing Trails Spanned
1	Outaouais, Laurentides, Laval, Montreal, Montérégie, Estrie, Centre-du-Québec, Chaudière-Appalaches, Bas-Saint-Laurent, Gaspésie, Îles-de-la-Madeleine	Ontario border, Fort-Coulonge, Gatineau, Laval, Montreal, Longueuil, Granby, Sherbrooke, Lévis, Rivière-du-Loup, Rimouski, Gaspé, Les Îles-de-la-Madeleine	Sentier des Voyageurs, La Vagabonde, Piste Cyclable du Canal-de-Chambly, Montérégiade II, Montérégiade I, L'Estriade, La Montagnarde, Les Grandes-Fourches, La Cantonnière, Parc Linéaire des Bois-Francs, Parc linéaire de la MRC de Lotbinière, Parc linéaire Le Grand Tronc, Par Linéaire des Anses, Véloroute des Migrations, Véloroute des Doux Pays, Le Littoral Basque
2	Abitibi-Témiscamingue, Outaouais, Laurentides, Laval, Montreal, Montérégie	Ville-Marie, Rouyn-Noranda, Val-d'Or, Saint-Jérôme, Laval, Montreal, Longueuil, New York State border	Ligne du Mocassin, Parc Linéaire Rouyn-Noranda - Taschereau, Parc Linéaire Le P'tit Train du Nord, Parc Linéaire des Basses-Laurentides, Vallée des Forts
3	Montérégie, Centre-du-Québec, Chaudière-Appalaches	Salaberry-de-Valleyfield, Longueuil, Sorel, Bécancour, Lévis	Parc du Canal de Beauharnois, La Riveraine, La Sauvagine, Circuit des Traditions
4	Mauricie, Centre-du-Québec, Montérégie, Estrie	Shawinigan, Trois-Rivières, Drummondville, Bromont, Vermont border	Circuit des Traditions, La Campagnarde
5	Montérégie, Montreal, Lanaudière, Mauricie, Capitale-Nationale, Charlevoix, Côte-Nord	Ontario border, Montreal, Trois-Rivières, Quebec City, Tadoussac, Baie-Comeau	Piste cyclable Soulanges, Piste cyclable des Berges, Chemin du Roy, Corridor du Littoral, Véloroute Marie-Hélène-Promont, Véloroute des Baleines
6	Capitale-Nationale, Chaudière-Appalaches	Rivière-à-Pierre, Quebec City, Lévis, Saint-Georges, Maine border	Piste cyclable Jacques-Cartier / Portneuf, Corridor des Cheminots, Véloroute de la Chaudière, Sentier des Jarrets Noirs
8	Saguenay-Lac-Saint-Jean, Côte-Nord, Charlevoix, Bas-Saint-Laurent	Alma, Saguenay, Tadoussac, Rivière-du-Loup, New Brunswick border	Véloroute des Bleuets, Parc Linéaire Interprovincial Petit-Témis

== Gallery ==
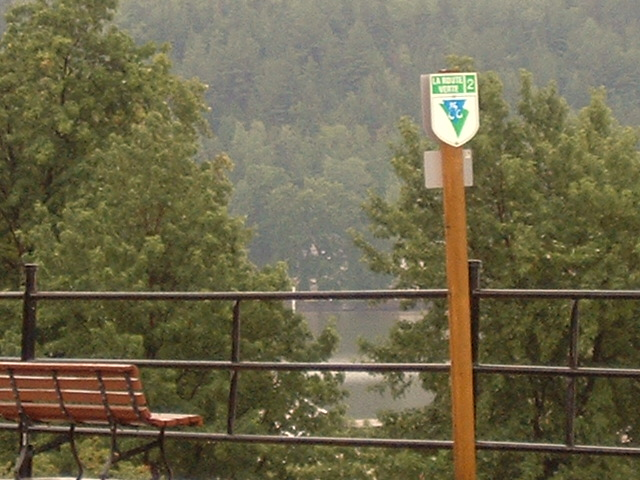
Beginning of "axe 2" of the Route Verte at Ville-Marie in Abitibi-Témiscamingue

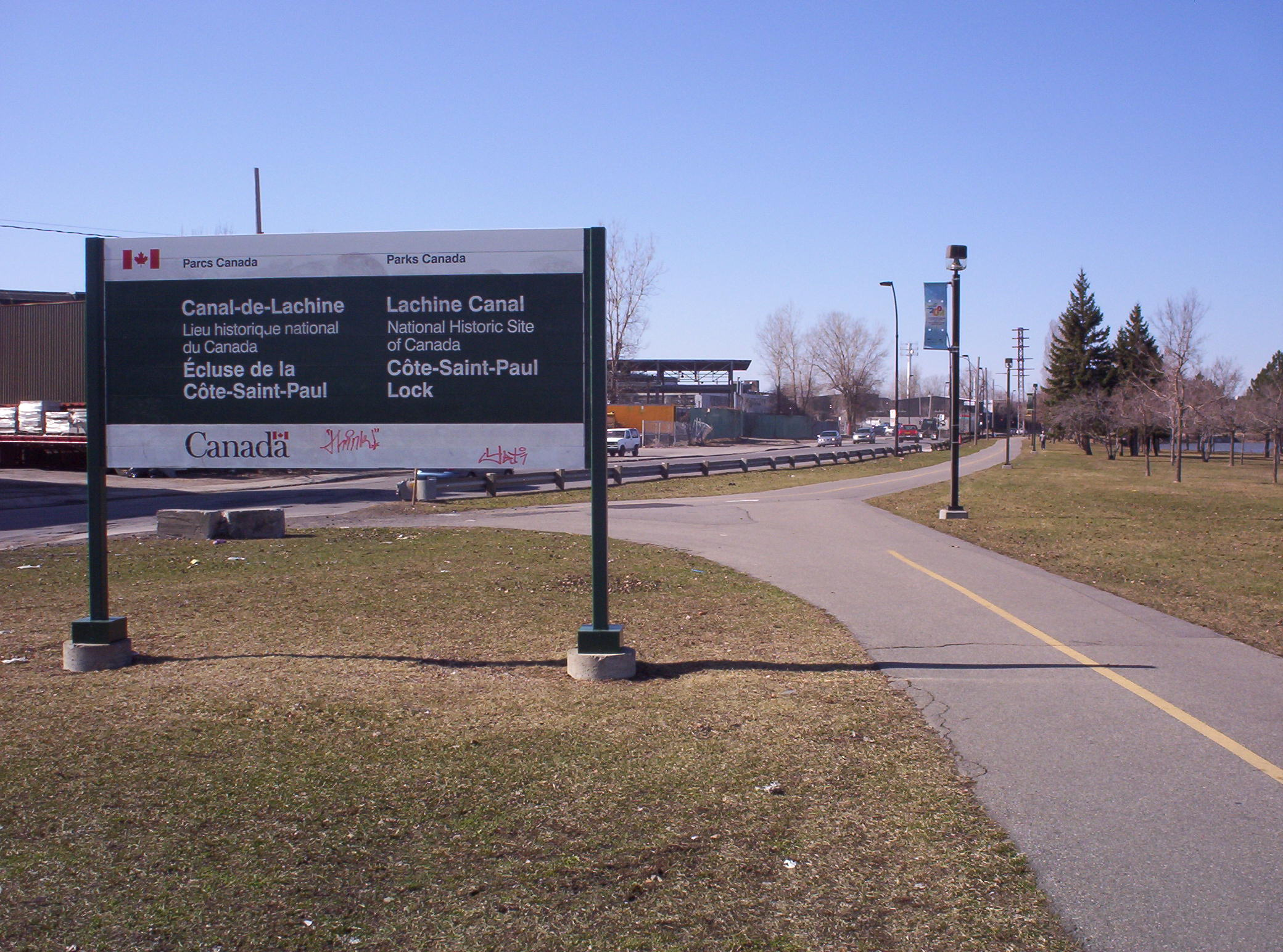
"Axe 5" of the Route Verte along the Lachine Canal, in Montreal

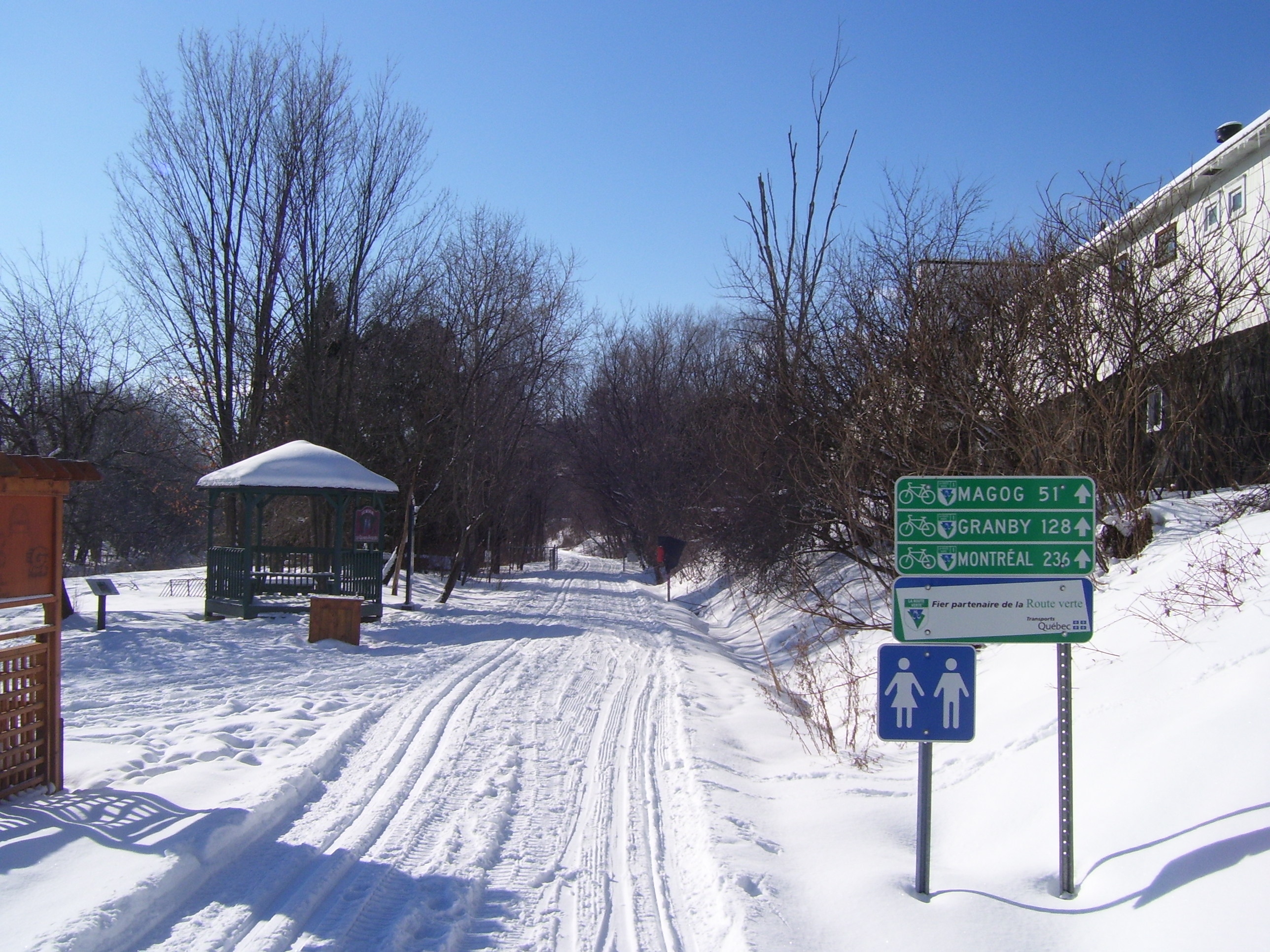
"Axe 1" of the Route Verte in the Lennoxville borough of Sherbrooke, used in the winter for cross-country skiing and snowshoeing.

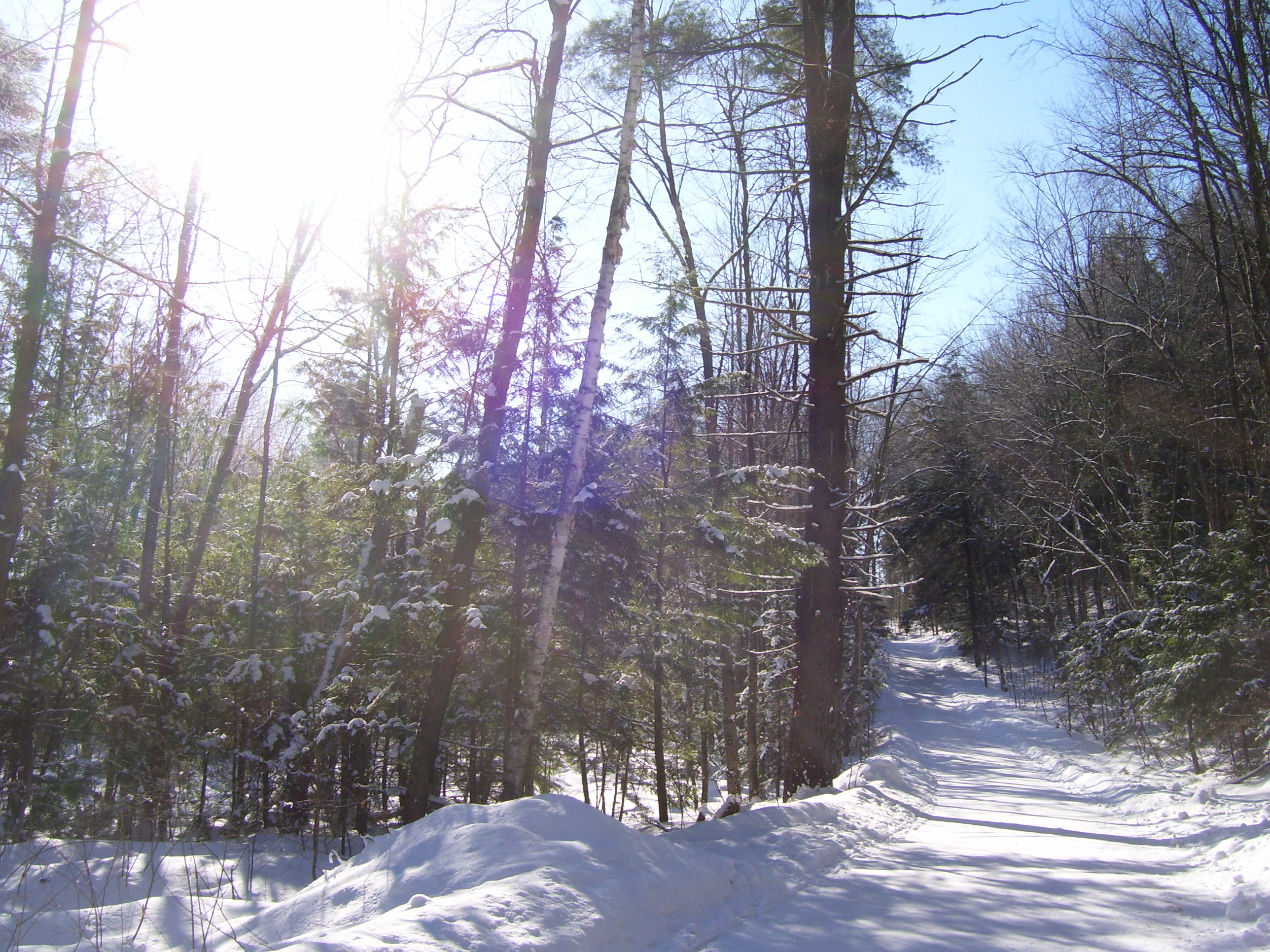
"Axe 1" of the Route Verte between Bishop's University and Lennoxville, used in the winter for walking.

== See also ==
- Bicycle trail
- Rail trail
- EuroVelo
- United States Numbered Bicycle Routes
