= Pont-Viau, Quebec =

Coordinates: 45°33′39″N 73°40′54″W

Pont-Viau
- Former city
- Ville de Laval
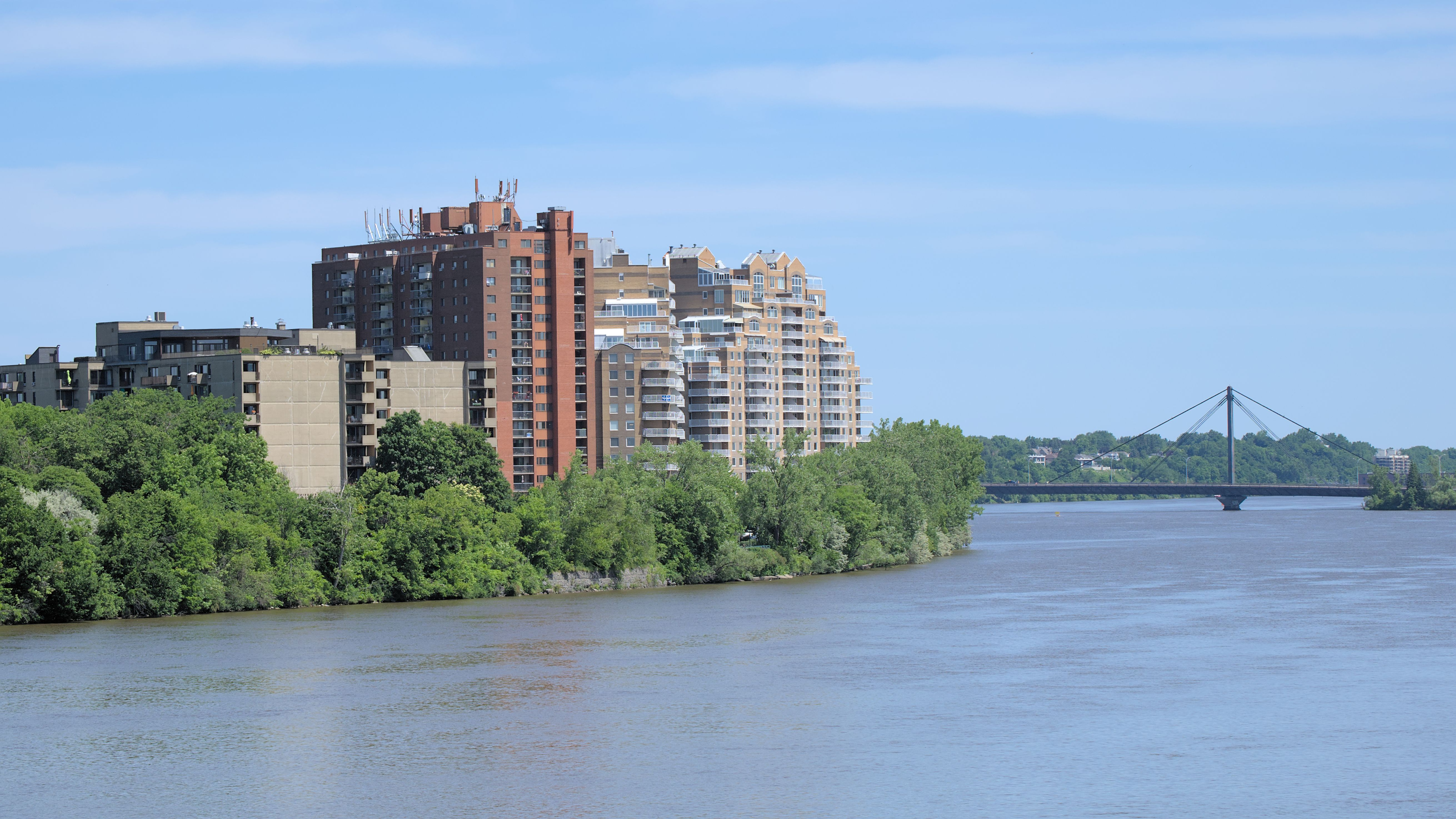
- Looking northeast from the Viau Bridge, with the Papineau-Leblanc Bridge visible in the background

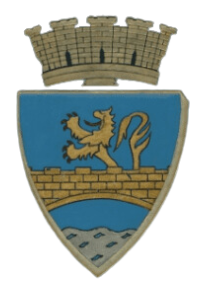
- Flag Coat of arms
- Motto: "Unité, progrès, grandeur" (French) "Unity, Progress, Greatness"
- Interactive map of Pont-Viau
- Country: Canada
- Province: Quebec
- Region: Laval
- Municipality: Laval

Pont-Viau (French pronunciation: [pɔ̃ vjo]) is a district in the southern part of Laval, Quebec, Canada. It was a town before August 6, 1965. It was named after Viau Bridge, which links it to Ahuntsic-Cartierville in Montreal, Quebec.

== Geography ==
It is delineated by the Rivière des Prairies to the south, by Duvernay to the east, by Vimont to the north and by Laval-des-Rapides to the west.

== Education ==
Commission scolaire de Laval operates French-language public schools.

- École primaire Saint-Gilles
- École primaire Saint-Julien

Sir Wilfrid Laurier School Board operates English-language public schools. All sections of Laval are zoned to Laval Junior Academy and Laval Senior Academy
