= Laval-des-Rapides =

Coordinates: 45°33′N 73°42′W

- Former city
- Ville de Laval
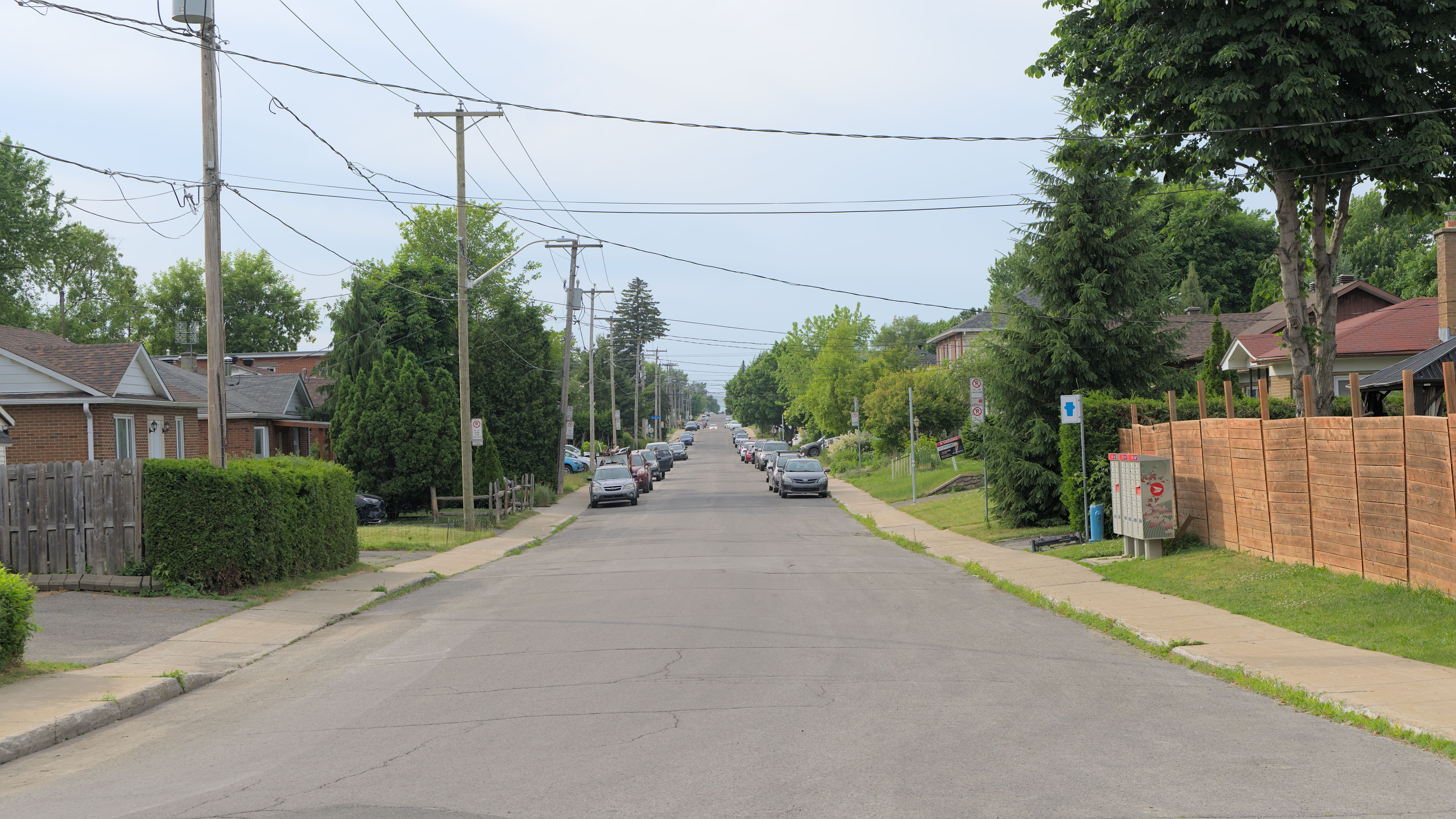
- Looking north along Avenue Quintal

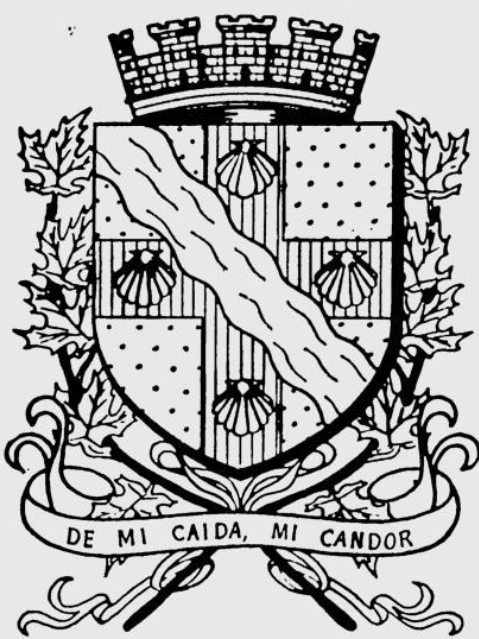
- Flag Coat of arms
- Motto(s): "Unité, progrès, grandeur" (French) "Unity, Progress, Greatness"
- Interactive map of Laval-des-Rapides
- Country: Canada
- Province: Quebec
- Region: Laval
- Municipality: Laval

Laval-des-Rapides (French pronunciation: [laval de ʁapid]) is a district in Laval, Quebec, Canada. It was a separate city until the municipal mergers on August 6, 1965.

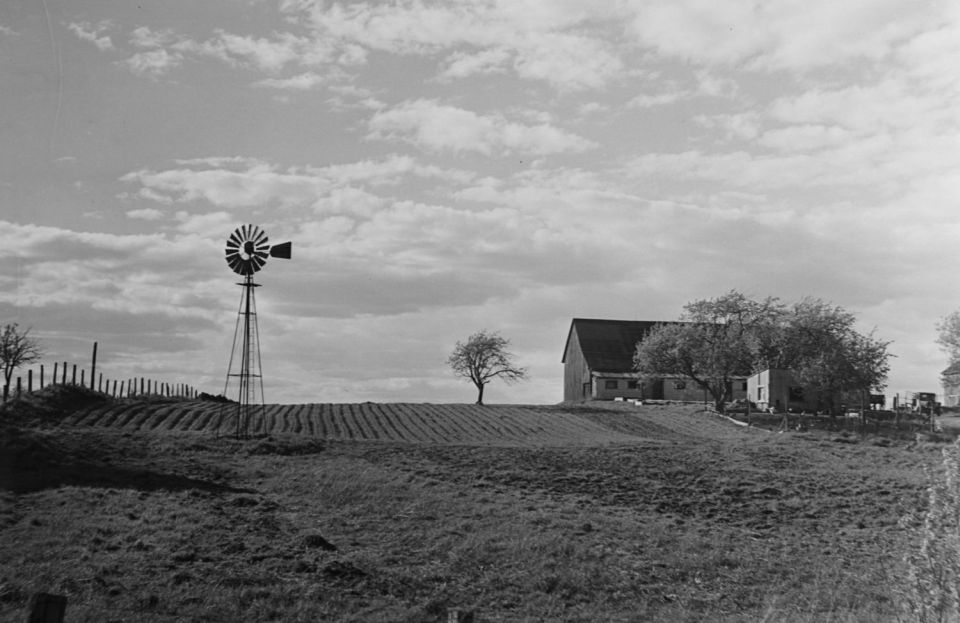
Farm in Laval-des-Rapides in 1941

== Geography ==
The neighbourhood is delimited on the north, north-west and west by Chomedey, on the east and north-east by Pont-Viau and on the south by the Rivière des Prairies.

== Education ==
Commission scolaire de Laval operates French-language public schools.

- Écoles secondaire de la Mosaïque
- Écoles secondaire Mont-de-La Salle
- École primaire De l’Arc-en-ciel
- École primaire Léon-Guilbault
- École primaire Marcel-Vaillancourt
- École primaire Sainte-Marguerite

Sir Wilfrid Laurier School Board operates English-language public schools. All sections of Laval are zoned to Laval Junior Academy and Laval Senior Academy.
