= Île Bigras =

Island in Laval, Quebec, Canada

Coordinates: 45°31′11″N 73°51′18″W

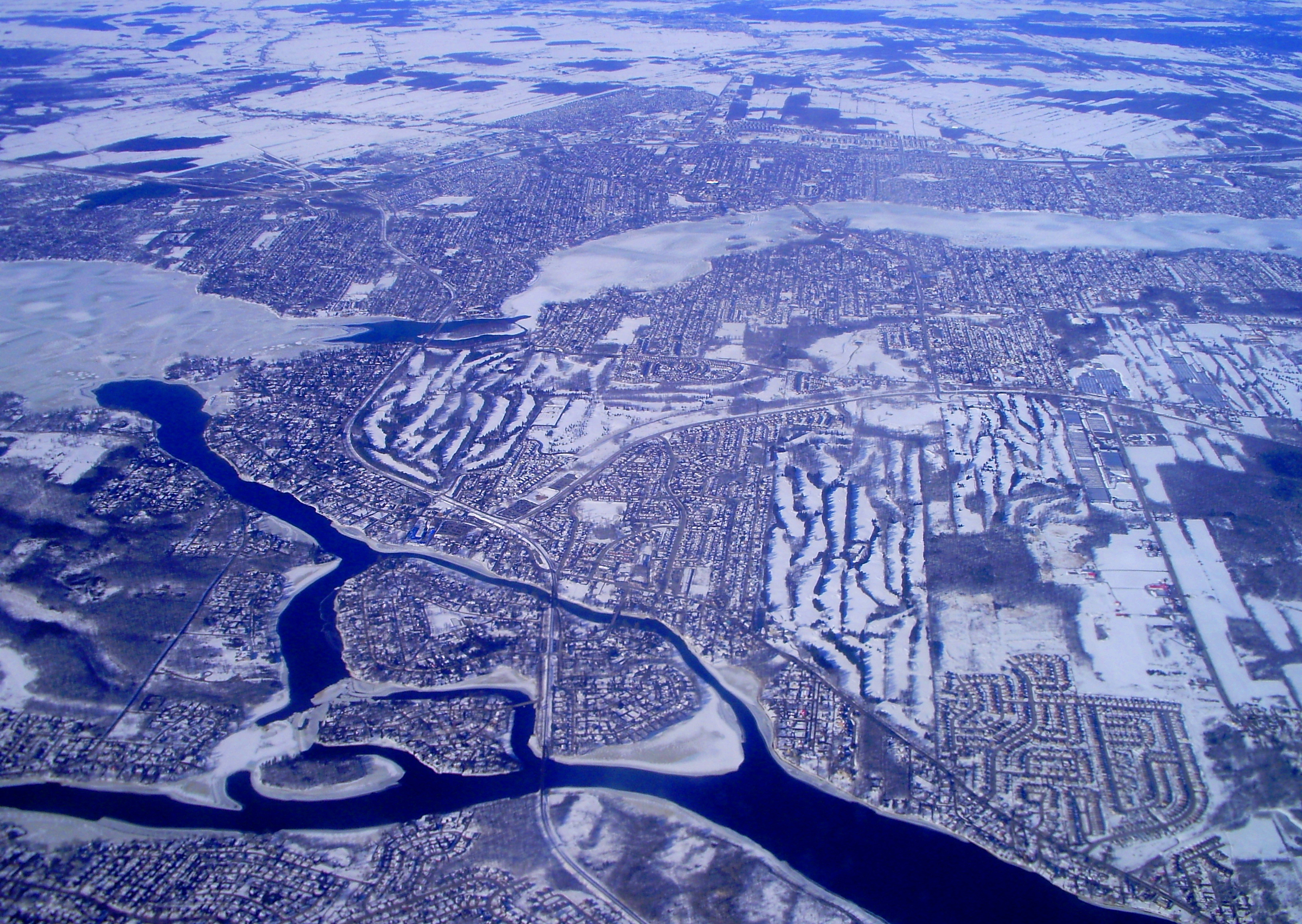
Île Bigras in winter

Île Bigras (French pronunciation: [il biɡʁa]; Bigras Island) is the largest of the four islands that make up the Îles Laval grouping in the Rivière des Prairies in Quebec. They have all been part of the city of Laval since 1965.

The 1 km (0.62 mi) Île Bigras was named in 1817 as Île Amesse, after the name of its owner, Louis Amesse (other more recent maps have also shown the names Île Boiret and Île Boisvert). The island was bought in 1890 by Émilien Bigras, who gave it his name. He was also the owner of the three other islands of the archipelago: Île Pariseau, Île Verte and Île Ronde.

Through a station on the Réseau express métropolitain line, the island is less than 30 minutes from Downtown Montreal and Central Station. It is also less than a quarter-hour from the seasonal reaction ferry that connects Île Bizard with Laval-sur-le-Lac. A park and ride at the station can accommodate several cars.

== See also ==
- Hochelaga Archipelago
- Île-Bigras station
