= Guy Lafleur Bridge =

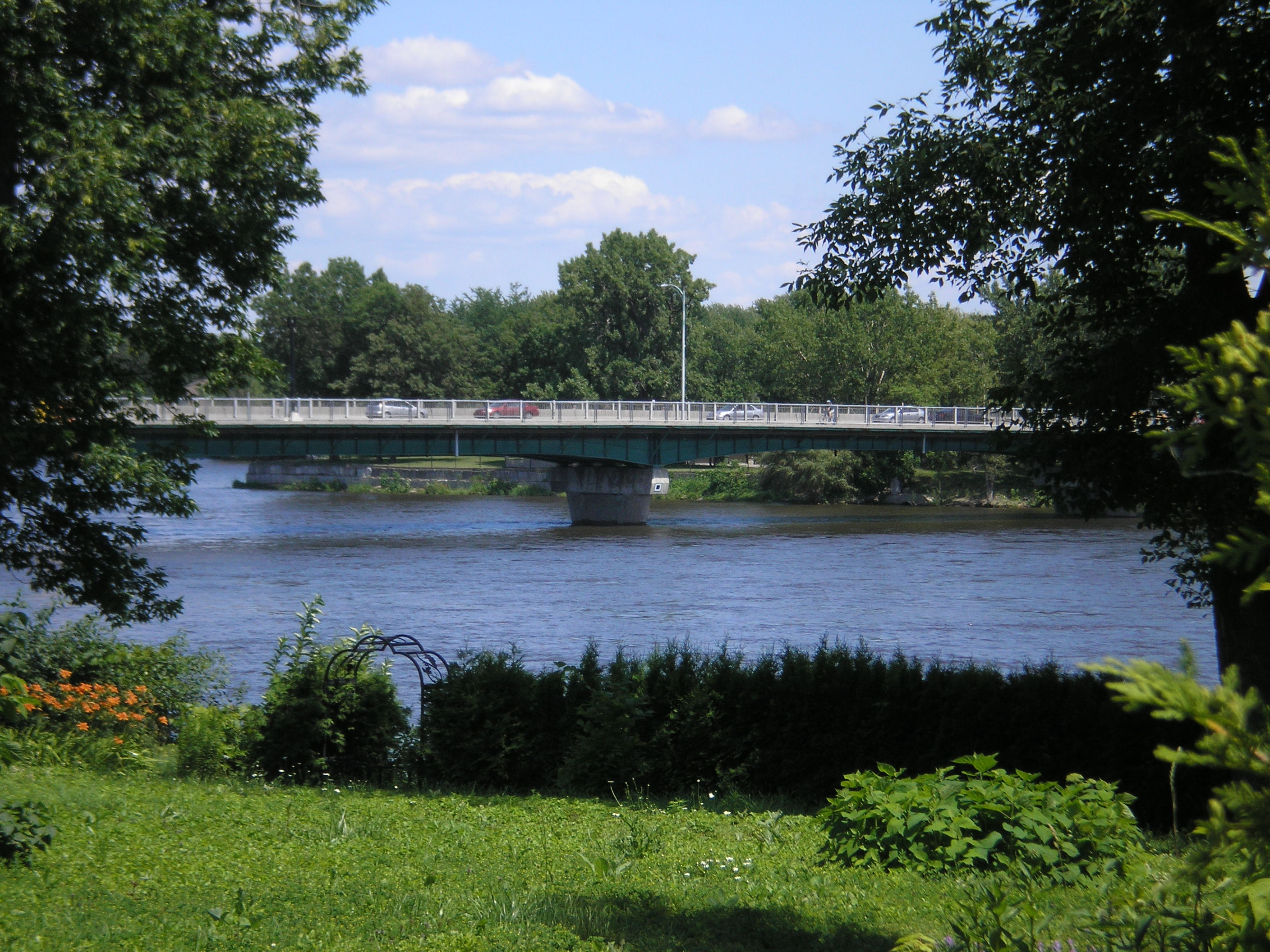
- Coordinates: 45°29′15″N 73°52′5″W
- Carries: 4 lanes of Jacques Bizard Boulevard
- Crosses: Rivière des Prairies (south branch)
- Locale: L'Île-Bizard, Quebec and Sainte-Geneviève, Quebec

Characteristics
- Width: Four lanes

History
- Opened: 1966

Location
- Interactive map of Guy Lafleur Bridge

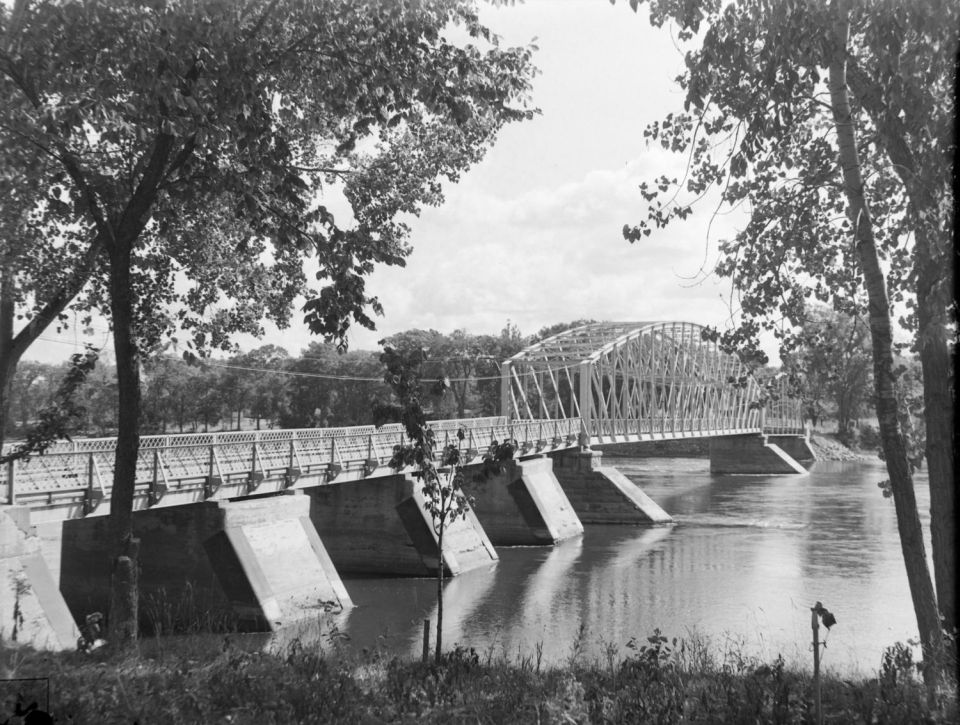
Bridge in 1948

Guy Lafleur Bridge is a bridge that crosses the Rivière des Prairies and connects the island of Île Bizard to Montreal Island. It was completed in 2024 and carries four lanes of Jacques Bizard Boulevard.

It was originally known as the Jacques Bizard Bridge, named after Jacques Bizard, who was seigneur of Île Bizard (then known as Île Bonaventure). In 2025 it was officially renamed in honour of Guy Lafleur, a former ice hockey player for the Montreal Canadiens and resident of Île Bizard for 30 years.

The bridge is the only access to Île Bizard except for the seasonal cable ferry that crosses the north branch of the Rivière des Prairies to connect with Laval-sur-le-Lac.

== Older bridges ==
An older version of the bridge was built in 1966 in the same location, and carried three lanes of Jacques Bizard Boulevard, including one reversible lane. In 2008 it was widened to accommodate a bicycle path. This bridge was dismantled after the current bridge was built alongside it.

The 1966 bridge replaced an even older bridge that was built in 1893 about 200 meters west of the current bridge, at the street named Rue du Pont.

== See also ==
- List of bridges to the Island of Montreal
- List of crossings of the Rivière des Prairies
