= Îles Laval =

Island grouping in the Rivière des Prairies, Quebec, Canada

Coordinates: 45°31′12″N 73°51′11″W

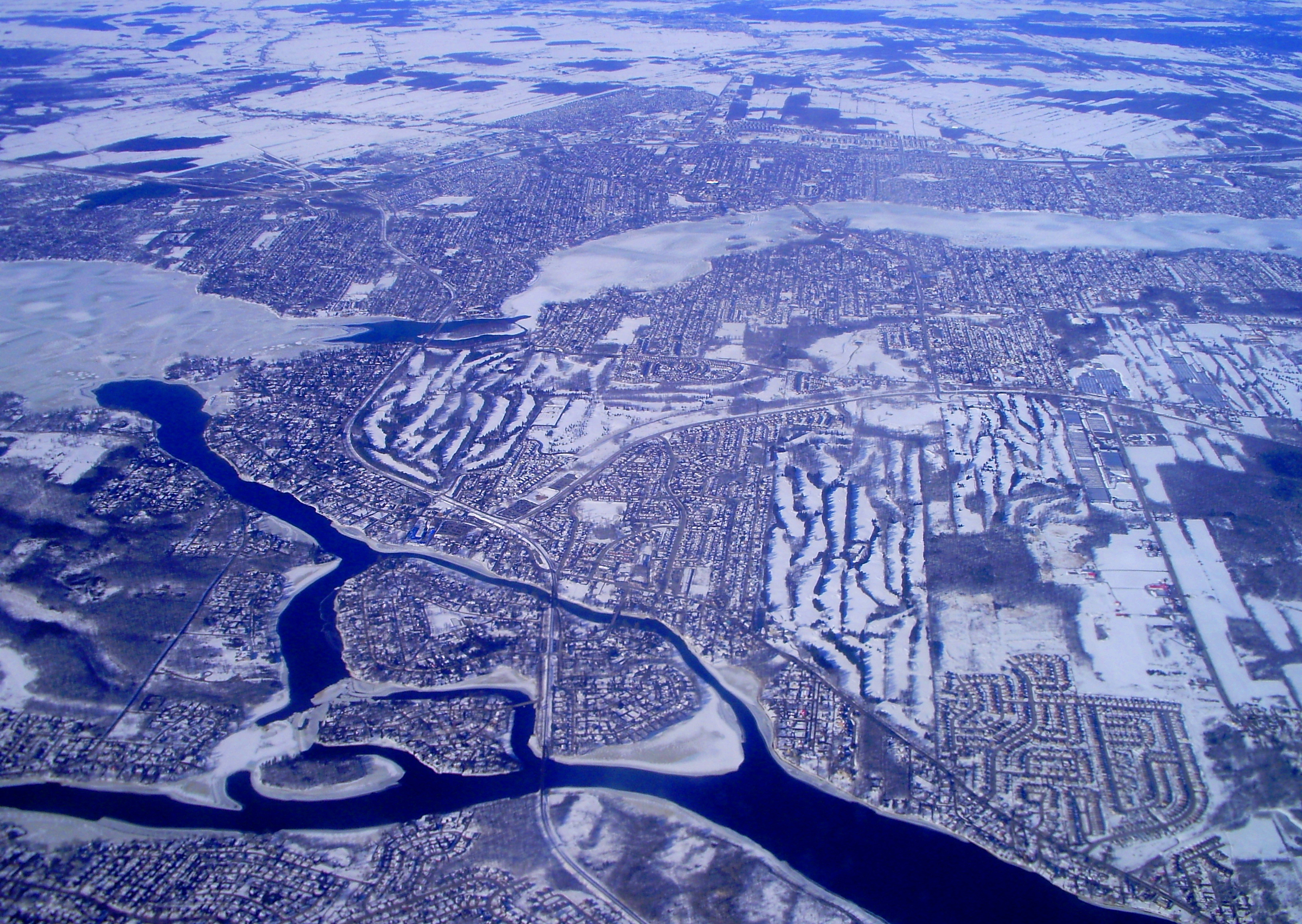
Almost centred on the Îles Laval area, with the train route running through the centre. Île Bizard and the Lake of Two Mountains are on the left, Montreal Island on the bottom across the Rivière des Prairies, Île Jésus to the right across the Rivière des Prairies, and the North Shore of Montreal across the Rivière des Mille Îles north of Île Jésus.

The Îles Laval (French pronunciation: [il laval]; Laval Islands) are an island grouping in the Rivière des Prairies in southwestern Quebec, part of the Hochelaga Archipelago.

Formerly an independent municipality (Les Îles-Laval), they became part of the city of Laval on August 6, 1965. The islands have a population of about 1,000.

== Geography ==
Located northeast of Île Bizard between the Island of Montreal and Île Jésus, they include Île Bigras, Île Pariseau, Île Verte and Île Ronde.

== Transportation ==
They are served by the Île-Bigras REM station which crosses the islands. A road bridge links the islands with the Sainte-Dorothée district of Laval, on Île Jésus.

There is a shared taxi, T26, on the island.

== See also ==
- Hochelaga Archipelago
- List of crossings of the Rivière des Prairies
- List of former towns in Quebec
- List of islands of Quebec
