= Île Pariseau =

Coordinates: 45°31′9.8″N 73°50′55″W

- Interactive map of Île Pariseau

Geography
- Location: Rivière des Prairies
- Archipelago: Hochelaga Archipelago

Administration
- Canada
- Province: Quebec
- City: Laval

Île Pariseau (French pronunciation: [il paʁizo]) is a small island located in the Rivière des Prairies across the river from Île Bizard and Montreal Island.

The island is part of Îles Laval which is linked to Île Jésus (Sainte Dorothée, Laval), Quebec, Canada. Îles Laval became part of Laval in 1965.
