= Dowker Island =

Uninhabited island in the St Lawrence River, near Montreal, Canada

l'Île Dowker
- Location within Southern Quebec

Geography
- Location: Saint Lawrence River
- Coordinates: 45°24′10″N 73°53′40″W
- Archipelago: Hochelaga Archipelago
- Area: 1 km^{2} (0.39 sq mi)
- Length: 1 km (0.6 mi)
- Width: 1 km (0.6 mi)

Administration
- Canada
- Province: Quebec
- City: Notre-Dame-de-l'Île-Perrot

Dowker Island is an uninhabited island in Lake Saint-Louis, a widening of the Saint Lawrence River south of Montreal Island, Quebec. It is in the municipality of Notre-Dame-de-l'Île-Perrot which intends to preserve its natural state.

The island is about a kilometre in length and breadth. Its surface geology is undifferentiated till deposits. It is low-lying, mostly in a 100-year flood area, and contains a muskrat habitat.

== History ==
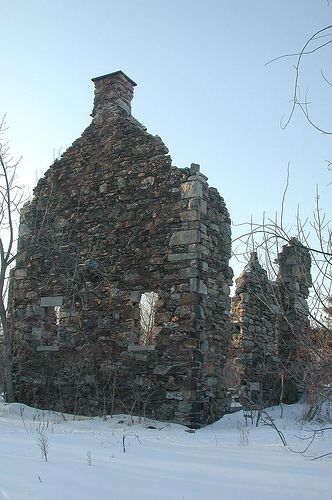
Ruins on Dowker Island

Then known as one of the îles Sainte-Geneviève (now Dowker, Madore, and Daoust), the island was granted to governor of Montreal François-Marie Perrot by Jean Talon, in 1672, along with the île Perrot. It was acquired in 1897 by Leslie Rose Dowker (unknown-1945), who shortly afterward became Mayor of Sainte-Anne-du-Bout-de-l'Île, now known as Sainte-Anne-de-Bellevue.

It is the site of a ruined stone house as well as a former navigational aid light.

In older documents, as late as the 1966 topographic map of Sainte-Anne-de-Bellevue, it is named Lynch Island.
