= Jacques Bizard =

Jacques Bizard (1642 – December 5, 1692) was a military officer who was given the post of "Major" of Montreal in 1677. Today he is best known as the namesake of the island of Île-Bizard, of which he became seigneur in 1678.

Born in Bevaix, Principality of Neuchâtel, to a Calvinist pastor, Bizard served in the Venetian army where he met Louis de Buade, better known as Comte de Frontenac. The two men later served together in the French army where Bizard was made aide-de-camp to Frontenac.

After Frontenac's appointment as Governor General of New France, Bizard accompanied him and landed in Quebec City in 1672. A few years later, he was sent to Montreal to investigate claims of illegal sale of alcohol to indigenous buyers. However, the leader of the smugglers, Montreal Governor François-Marie Perrot, imprisoned Bizard. With the help of Frontenac, Bizard was liberated and Perrot was removed from office.

During his tenure in office, he continued Perrot's illegal alcohol trade. Despite being condemned by prominent Montrealers for this action, his friendship with Frontenac protected him from any legal actions.

== Île Bizard ==
In 1678, he was granted a seigneury on Île Bonaventure (nowadays named Île Bizard after him). However he did not actually live there. In fact the island was not settled until 1735, when his eldest daughter granted the first land concessions.

The bridge which connects Île Bizard to Montreal Island was originally named after him, but in 2025 was renamed to the Guy Lafleur Bridge. However, the road that the bridge carries is still named Boulevard Jacques Bizard.

== Personal life ==
In 1678 he married Jeanne-Cécile Closse. The couple had 9 children, 4 of whom would live to adulthood.
