= Sainte-Thérèse Island =

Sainte-Thérèse Island (or Île Sainte-Thérèse, in French) may refer to:

- Seigneurie de l'Île-Sainte-Thérèse, one of the seignories constituting Varennes, Quebec Canada
- L'Île-Sainte-Thérèse, neighborhood in Saint-Jean-sur-Richelieu, Quebec, Canada
- Sainte-Thérèse Island (Richelieu River), an island in Saint-Jean-sur-Richelieu, Quebec, Canada
- Sainte-Thérèse Island (St. Lawrence River), an island in Varennes, Quebec, Canada
