= L'Île-Cadieux =

- City
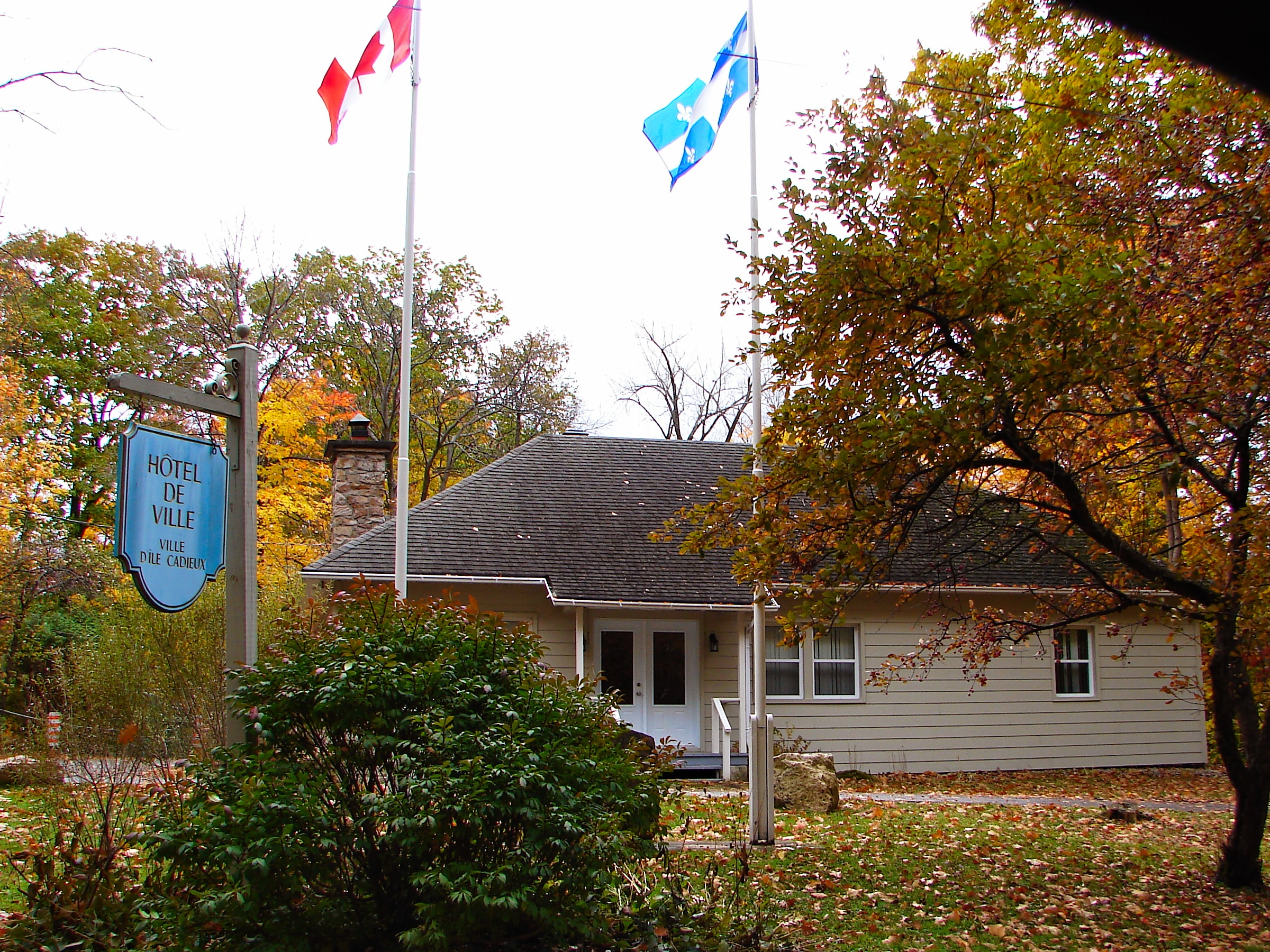
- Town hall

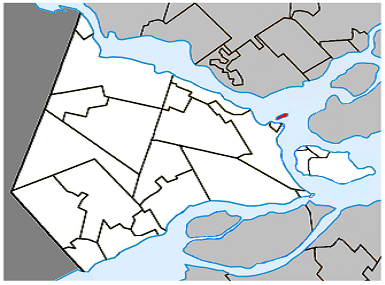
- Location within Vaudreuil-Soulanges RCM

- Location in southern Quebec
- Coordinates: 45°26′N 74°01′W
- Country: Canada
- Province: Quebec
- Region: Montérégie
- RCM: Vaudreuil-Soulanges
- Constituted: March 21, 1922

Government
  - Mayor: Martin Charland
  - Federal riding: Vaudreuil-Soulanges
  - Prov. riding: Vaudreuil

Area
  - Total: 8.90 km^{2} (3.44 sq mi)
  - Land: 0.59 km^{2} (0.23 sq mi)

Population (2021)
  - Total: 120
  - Density: 204.8/km^{2} (530/sq mi)
  - Pop 2016-2021: ▼4.8%
  - Dwellings: 64
- Time zone: UTC−5 (EST)
  - Summer (DST): UTC−4 (EDT)
- Postal code(s): J7V 8P3
- Area codes: 450 and 579
- Highways: No major routes
- Website: www.ilecadieux.ca

L'Île-Cadieux (French pronunciation: [lil kadjø]) is a village and municipality in the Montérégie region of Quebec, Canada, part of the Vaudreuil-Soulanges Regional County Municipality. It is located on and contiguous with Cadieux Island, which projects into Lake of Two Mountains just north off Vaudreuil-sur-le-Lac. The population as of the Canada 2021 Census was 120.

== History ==
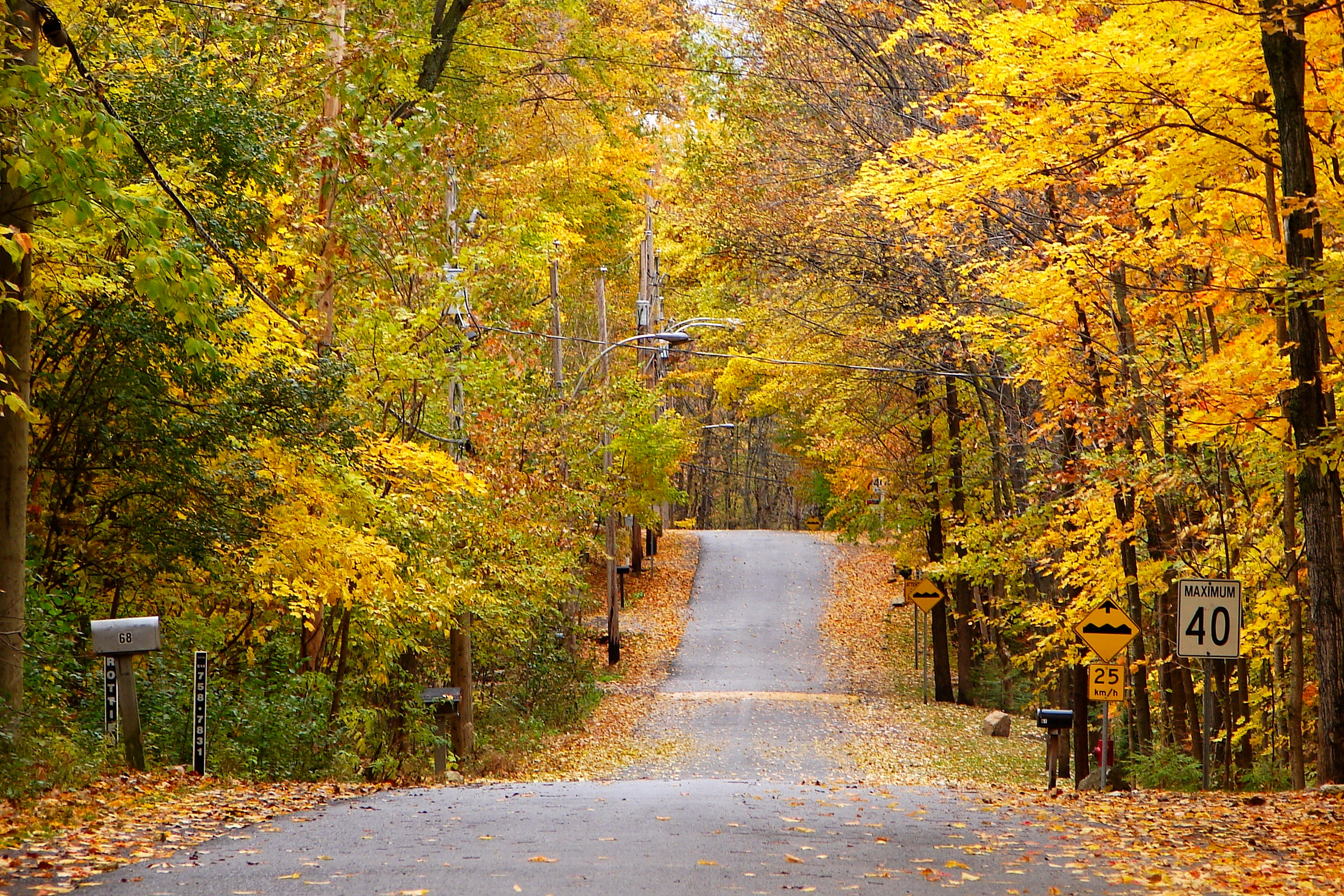
Chemin de l'Île, the primary and only road on Cadieux Island

The island was formerly known as Vaudreuil Island but was named "Île à Cadieu" in an unpublished document of the second half of the nineteenth century. This name could be a reference to one of two Cadieux, Pierre and Hyacinthe, who owned land in the first concession along the Cove of Vaudreuil at that time.

In 1922, the municipality was formed by separating from the Parish Municipality of Saint-Michel-de-Vaudreuil.

== Geography ==
The municipality is situated on Cadieux Island in Lake of Two Mountains and forms part of the Hochelaga Archipelago. The municipality has a total area of 8.89 km², most of which is water; the land area of the island itself covers 0.59 km².

== Demographics ==
Historical Census Data - L'Île-Cadieux, Quebec
Year	Pop.	±%
1931	17	—
1941	6	−64.7%
1951	12	+100.0%
1956	16	+33.3%
1961	18	+12.5%
1966	22	+22.2%
1971	45	+104.5%
1976	75	+66.7%
1981	99	+32.0%
1986	113	+14.1%
1991	140	+23.9%
1996	121	−13.6%
2001	127	+5.0%
2006	128	+0.8%
2011	105	−18.0%
2016	126	+20.0%
2021	120	−4.8%
Source: Statistics Canada

In the 2021 Census of Population conducted by Statistics Canada, L'Île-Cadieux had a population of 120 living in 55 of its 64 total private dwellings, a change of −4.8% from its 2016 population of 126. With a land area of 0.59 km^{2} (0.23 sq mi), it had a population density of 203.4/km^{2} (526.8/sq mi) in 2021.

Canada census – L'Île-Cadieux community profile

	2021	2016	2011
Population	120 (-4.8% from 2016)	126 (20.0% from 2011)	105 (-18.0% from 2006)
Land area	0.59 km^{2} (0.23 sq mi)	0.59 km^{2} (0.23 sq mi)	0.57 km^{2} (0.22 sq mi)
Population density	204.8/km^{2} (530/sq mi)	212.3/km^{2} (550/sq mi)	185.2/km^{2} (480/sq mi)
Median age	59.2 (M: 61.6, F: 54.8)	57.0 (M: 57.2, F: 56.8)	57.1 (M: 60.0, F: 54.2)
Private dwellings	64 (total) 55 (occupied)	64 (total)	59 (total)
Median household income	$.N/A	$.N/A	$.N/A

Notes: Income data for this area has been suppressed for data quality or confidentiality reasons.
References: 2021 2016 2011

Canada Census Mother Tongue - L'Île-Cadieux, Quebec
Census	Total	French			English			French & English			Other		
Year	Responses	Count	Trend	Pop %	Count	Trend	Pop %	Count	Trend	Pop %	Count	Trend	Pop %
2021	120	65	▼13.3%	54.2%	25	▼16.6%	20.8%	0	0.0%	0.0%	30	▲50.0%	25.0%
2016	125	75	▲8.3%	60.0%	30	▲20.0%	24.0%	0	0.0%	0.0%	20	0.0%	16.0%
2011	105	60	▲20.0%	57.1%	25	▼44.4%	23.8%	0	0.0%	0.0%	20	▼33.3%	19.1%
2006	125	50	▼47.4%	40.0%	45	▲200.0%	36.0%	0	0.0%	0.0%	30	▲100.0%	24.0%
2001	125	95	▲46.2%	76.0%	15	▼25.0%	12.0%	0	0.0%	0.0%	15	▼57.1%	12.0%
1996	120	65	n/a	54.2%	20	n/a	16.7%	0	n/a	0.0%	35	n/a	29.2%

== Government ==
List of former mayors:

- William G. Bailey (1922-1929)
- William Robert Eakin (1929-1932)
- Nelson Webster Howard (1932-1938)
- James Fergus (1938-1953, 1955-1967)
- Douglas Bremner (1953-1955)
- A. M. Leslie (1967-1977)
- J. G. Weiss (1977-1981)
- Michel Derenne (1981-1989)
- Peter Jackson (1989-1993, 1994-2002)
- Réal Rainville (1993-1994)
- Pierre Montesano (2002-2005)
- Marc-André Léger (2005-2013)
- Paul Herbach (2013-2017)
- Daniel Martel (2017–present)

== Education ==
Commission Scolaire des Trois-Lacs operates Francophone schools. It is zoned to École Saint-Michel and École Sainte-Madeleine in Vaudreuil-Dorion.

Lester B. Pearson School Board operates Anglophone schools. It is zoned to Mount Pleasant Elementary School in Hudson.

== See also ==
- List of anglophone communities in Quebec
- List of cities in Quebec
