= Pointe-Claire Yacht Club =

Coordinates: 45°25′45″N 73°49′18″W

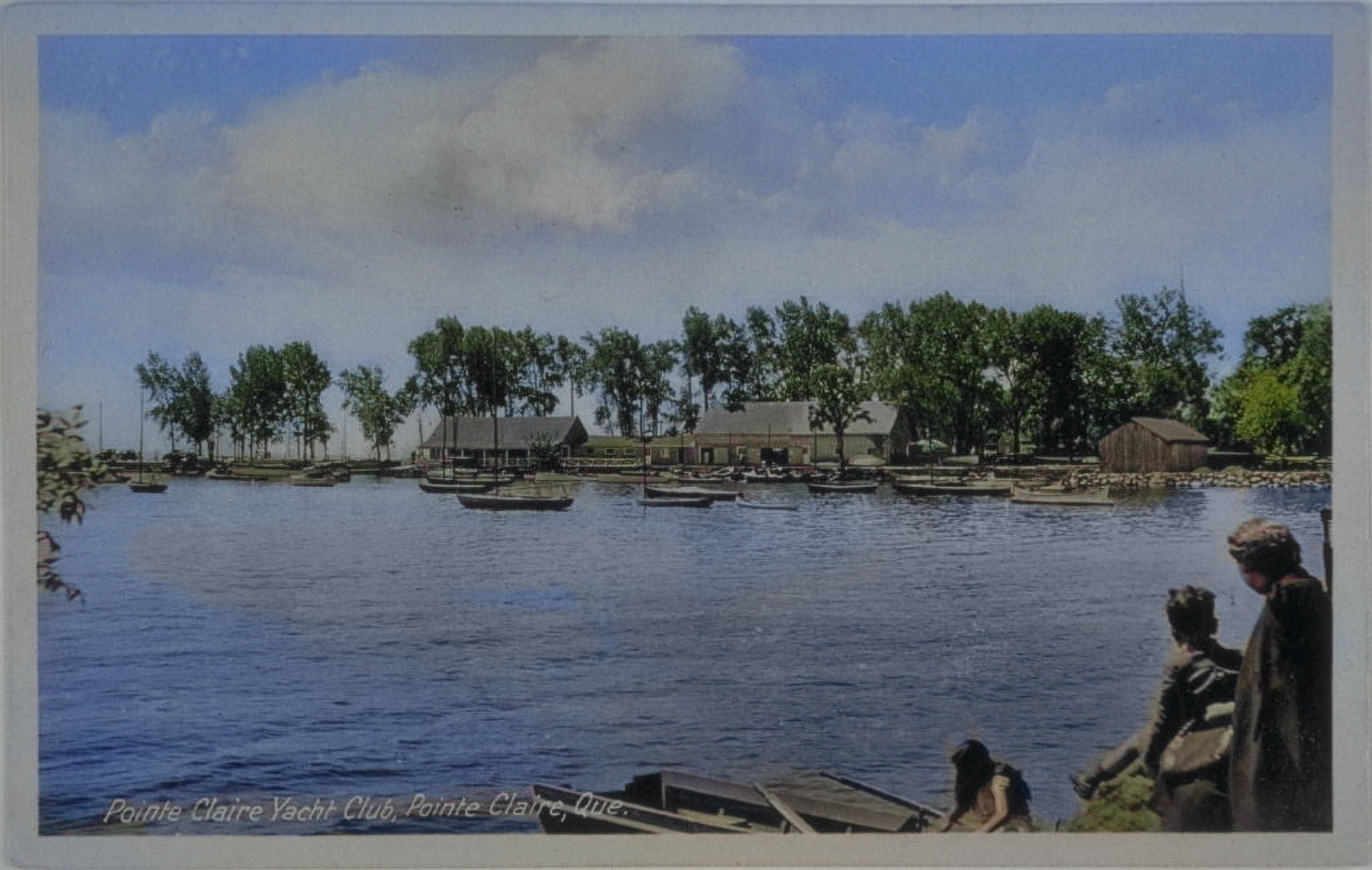
- Pointe-Claire Yacht Club, 1930s
- Abbreviation: PCYC
- Formation: 1879
- Location: 1 Avenue Cartier Pointe-Claire, Montreal, Quebec, Canada
- Official language: English, French
- Commodore: Jean-Luc Taschereau
- Website: www.pcyc.qc.ca

The Pointe-Claire Yacht Club is a yacht club in Pointe-Claire, Quebec, Canada. It is on the shore of Lac Saint-Louis, a widening of the St. Lawrence River on the southern shore of the Island of Montreal. The club promotes racing and hosts regattas run by the provincial organization, Voile Québec.

The club has slips for about 150 boats and dry dock for dozens of others. A municipal lightning detector and alarm is nearby.

Racing programs use Lasers, Optimists, and 420s.

With the motto "sailing is freedom", the Association Québecoise de voile adaptée operates a sailing program for people with mobility impairments, hosted at the PCYC site.

The PCYC has reciprocal arrangements with about 50 other clubs.

== History ==
The club is sited on a former railway pier used to load limestone blocks from a nearby quarry in the Village of Saint-Joachim-de-la-Pointe-Claire, as it was then known. The blocks were loaded onto barges to be floated downriver to the construction site of the Victoria Bridge.

After the bridge was completed, the Pointe-Claire Boating Club formed in 1879 on the pier, leased from the Grand Trunk Railway. The clubhouse built that year is still in use as the clubhouse today. Facilities expanded quickly, and in 1889 made space for the newly-formed St. Lawrence Yacht Club, until they moved to their own site in Dorval.

In 1920 the railway sold the pier and surrounding land to the club. Unlike yacht clubs in Beaconsfield and Baie d'Urfé, which are on municipal land, the site is owned by the PCYC and pays municipal taxes. The club focused on paddling until 1924 when it incorporated as the Pointe-Claire Yacht Club.

A club-sponsored Sea Scout group was based at PCYC from 1930 to 1942, when it moved to its own site at what is now the Baie-de-Valois Nautical Centre Sailing Base.

From the 1930s to the 1950s the club had its own one-design class, a 19-footer with a Bermuda rig.

The breakwater and jetties were added in 1964.

Club members have included international sailing race officials and members of the Canadian national sailing team.
