= Rivière des Prairies =

Coordinates: 45°35′22″N 73°39′26″W

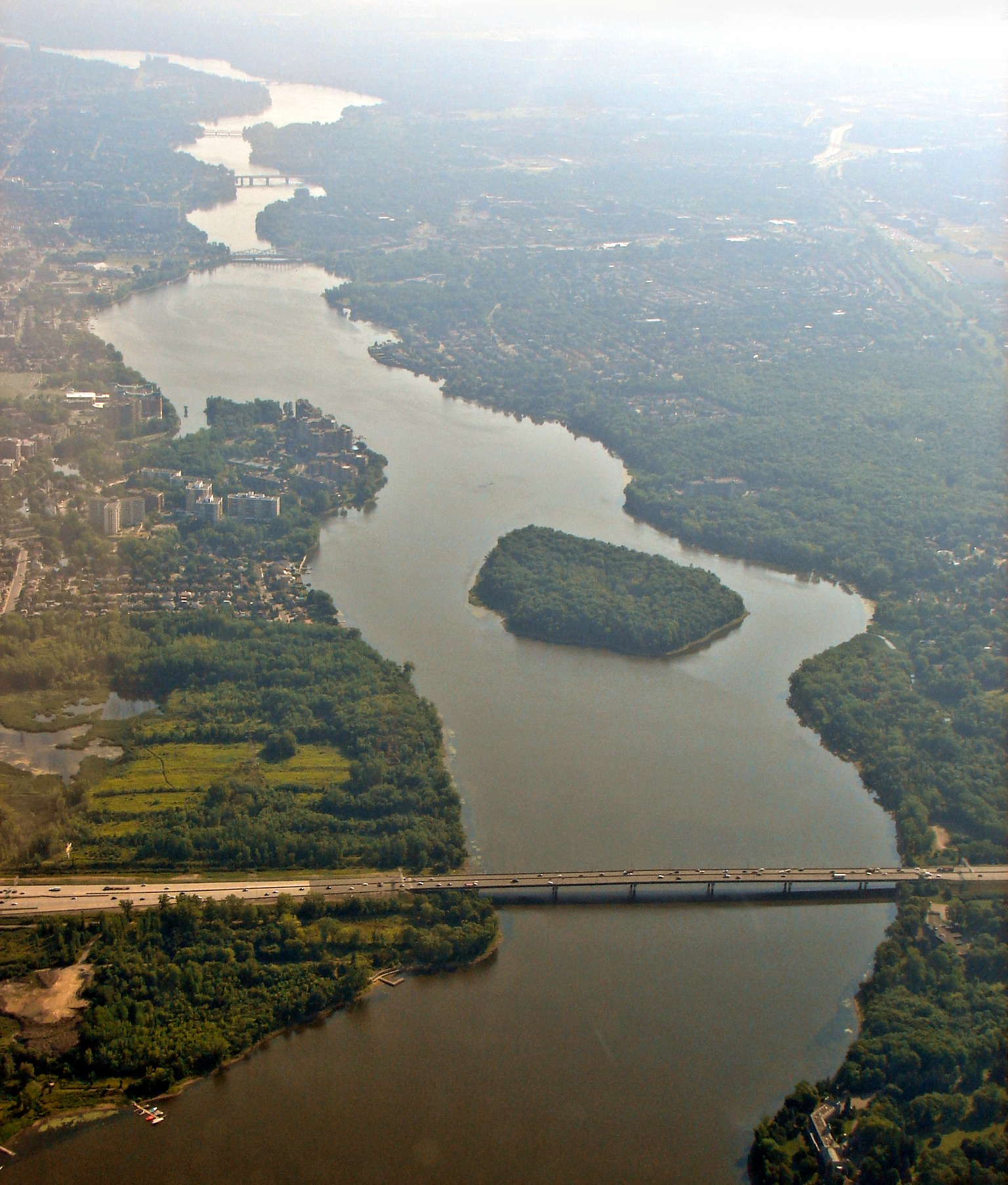
- Aerial view looking east, of Rivière des Prairies with Louis Bisson Bridge in the foreground. The island "Île aux Chats" can be seen near the centre.

Location
- Country: Canada
- Province: Quebec
- Region: Montreal and Laval

Physical characteristics
- Source
  - location: Lake of Two Mountains
- Mouth
  - location: Saint Lawrence River

The Rivière des Prairies (pronounced [ʁivjɛʁ de pʁɛʁi]; lit. 'River of the Prairies'), called the Back River in English, is a delta channel of the Ottawa River in southwestern Quebec, Canada. The Kanien'kehá:ka called it Skowanoti, meaning "River behind the island". The river separates the cities of Laval and Montreal.

== Geography ==
Flowing west to east, the Rivière des Prairies bisects the Hochelaga Archipelago and originates in the Lake of Two Mountains. It flows on either side of Île Bizard (part of Montreal), then divides the Island of Montreal (Montreal) to the south from Île Jésus (Laval) to the north, after which it flows into the St. Lawrence River at the eastern tip of the Island of Montreal.

The river contains a large number of islands, including Île Bizard, the Îles Laval (Île Bigras, Île Pariseau, Île Verte and Île Ronde) belonging to Laval, and Île de la Visitation, a nature park belonging to Montreal. There are also islands named Île Mercier, Île Ménard, Île Jasmin, Île Barwick, Île de Roxboro, Île aux Chats, Île Paton, Île Perry, Île Lapierre, Île Boutin, Île Rochon and Île Gagné, among many others.

The Rivière des Prairies has many rapids. Rapids are shown in several places on the 1879 map of Henry Whitmersome Hopkins, and on Gordon and Gotch's map of the Island of Montreal from 1924. Named rapids of the river, starting from the west, are the "Rapides de Cap-Saint-Jacques", the Lalemant(Dutchman) Rapids that are located between Île Bizard and Laval (with a ferry), the "Rapides du Cheval Blanc"(Whitehorse rapids) that are located in between the borough of Pierrefonds-Roxboro and Sainte-Dorothée, the Laval rapids, the "Sault-au-Récollet Rapids" that are located north of Bordeaux Prison, and ending with the "Rapides de la Rivière des Prairies".

The riverfront in the West Island area was famous for its beaches along the river. Some were named "Crystal", "Noel/Roy", "Riviera", and Roxboro municipal beach.

== Environmental issues ==
The river receives massive discharges of untreated liquid waste from metropolitan Montreal and the newly developed suburbs by way of over 150 discharge outlets. Whenever there is significant rainfall on the island of Montreal, household sewage is mixed with the city street rainwater and discharged untreated into the river. This sewage turns the river into essentially an open sewer. The sewage problem was reported in the year 1911., and a need to purify Montreal sewage in 1935. The Montreal Board of Trade (BOT) commissioned a report on the water pollution in the late 1950s, and the report was given to Premier Barrette.

Montreal has six drinking-water plants on the Island whose source of water is the Rivière des Prairies and Lac Saint Louis. Reportedly, Montreal and Quebec city drinking water is tested.

It is claimed modern sewage treatment techniques have reversed much of the damage from the sewage. Some people consider the river clean again, starting in the year 1998, when most of the sewage was treated before being discharged. However, parts of the river are never suitable for swimming . Specifically the location of R.D.P. 140, the Rive-Boisée area has been polluted since the year 1971 is still polluted from raw sewage more than forty years later . The Rive-Boisée problem had been noticed and was reported to be repaired in 2014. The reason for the sewage problem is that the storm sewer drain system and the sanitary sewer system were mistakenly connected in many places, and it takes money to correct and repair. Reports from the R.S.M.A.(Réseau de suivi du milieu aquatique) dated 2021 on the water quality of RDP-140 indicate the problem has not been fixed.

From Bing maps, many of the sewage output locations can be seen on the river shoreline. The solution to the visible pollution (plastic bags, toilet paper, condoms) that accumulates on the shoreline is to use a type of a screen at all the storm drains and outlets that expel the rainwater-garbage mixture into the river.

== See also ==
- Fecal-oral route, about diseases that can be transmitted from feces in water.
- Hochelaga Archipelago
- List of bridges spanning the Rivière des Prairies
- List of crossings of the Rivière des Prairies
- List of hydroelectric stations
- List of Quebec rivers
- Saint Lawrence Seaway
