= Sainte-Thérèse Island (St. Lawrence River) =

Island in Quebec, Canada

Native name: Île Sainte-Thérèse
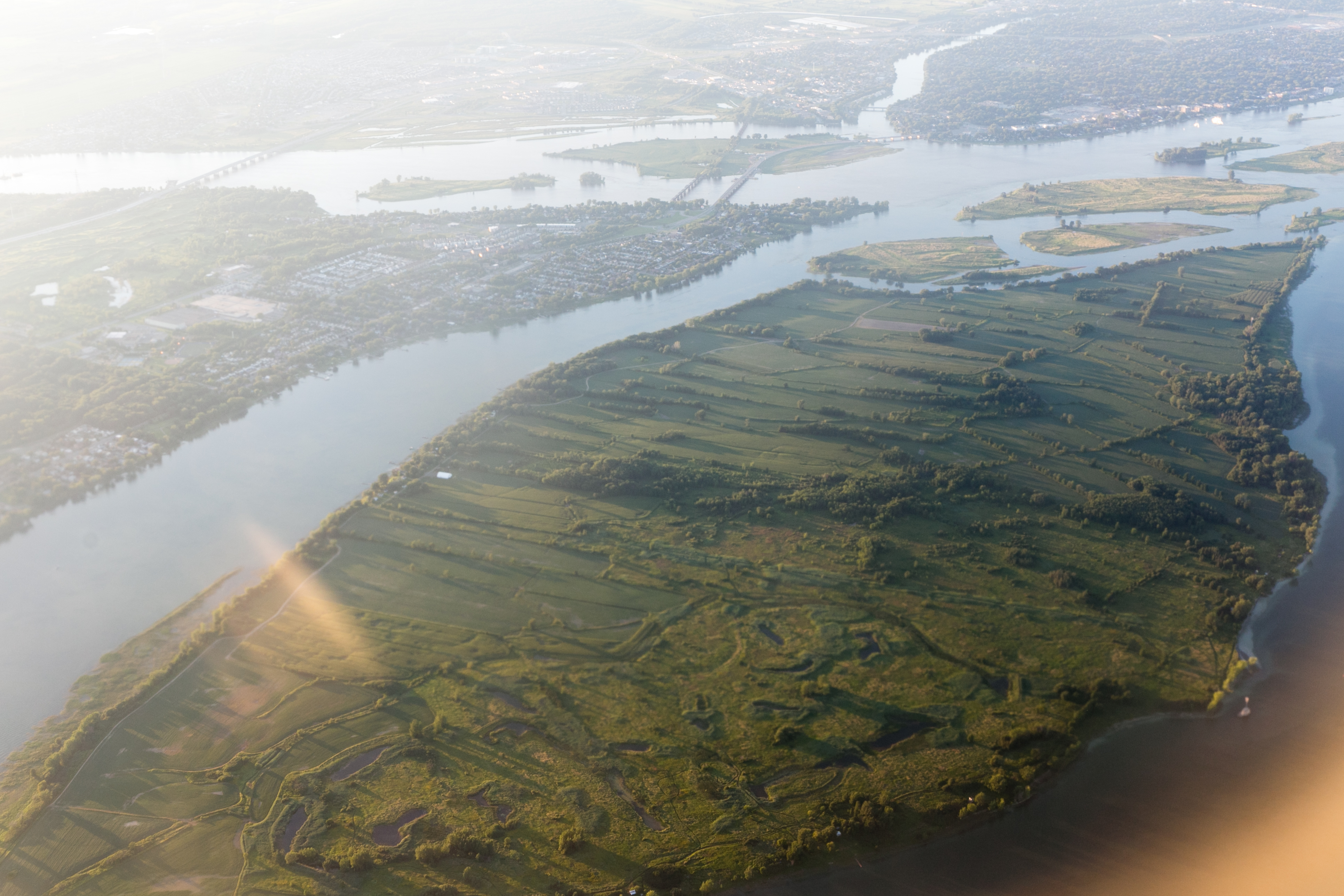
- Aerial view of Île Sainte-Thérèse and part of the Hochelaga archipelago

- Location within Quebec

Geography
- Location: Saint Lawrence River, in Varennes, Marguerite-D'Youville Regional County Municipality, Montérégie, Québec, Canada
- Coordinates: 45.6817°N 73.4703°W
- Archipelago: Hochelaga Archipelago
- Length: 4.8 km (2.98 mi)
- Width: 1.6 km (0.99 mi)

Administration
- Canada

Île Sainte-Thérèse (English: Sainte-Thérèse Island) is an island of the Saint Lawrence River, located northeast of Island of Montreal. Administratively attached to the municipality of Varennes, located in the Marguerite-D'Youville Regional County Municipality, in Montérégie, in the province of Quebec, in Canada.

This island has an area of approximately 5.4 square kilometres (2.1 sq mi), making it the fifth most extensive island in the Hochelaga Archipelago.

== Geography ==
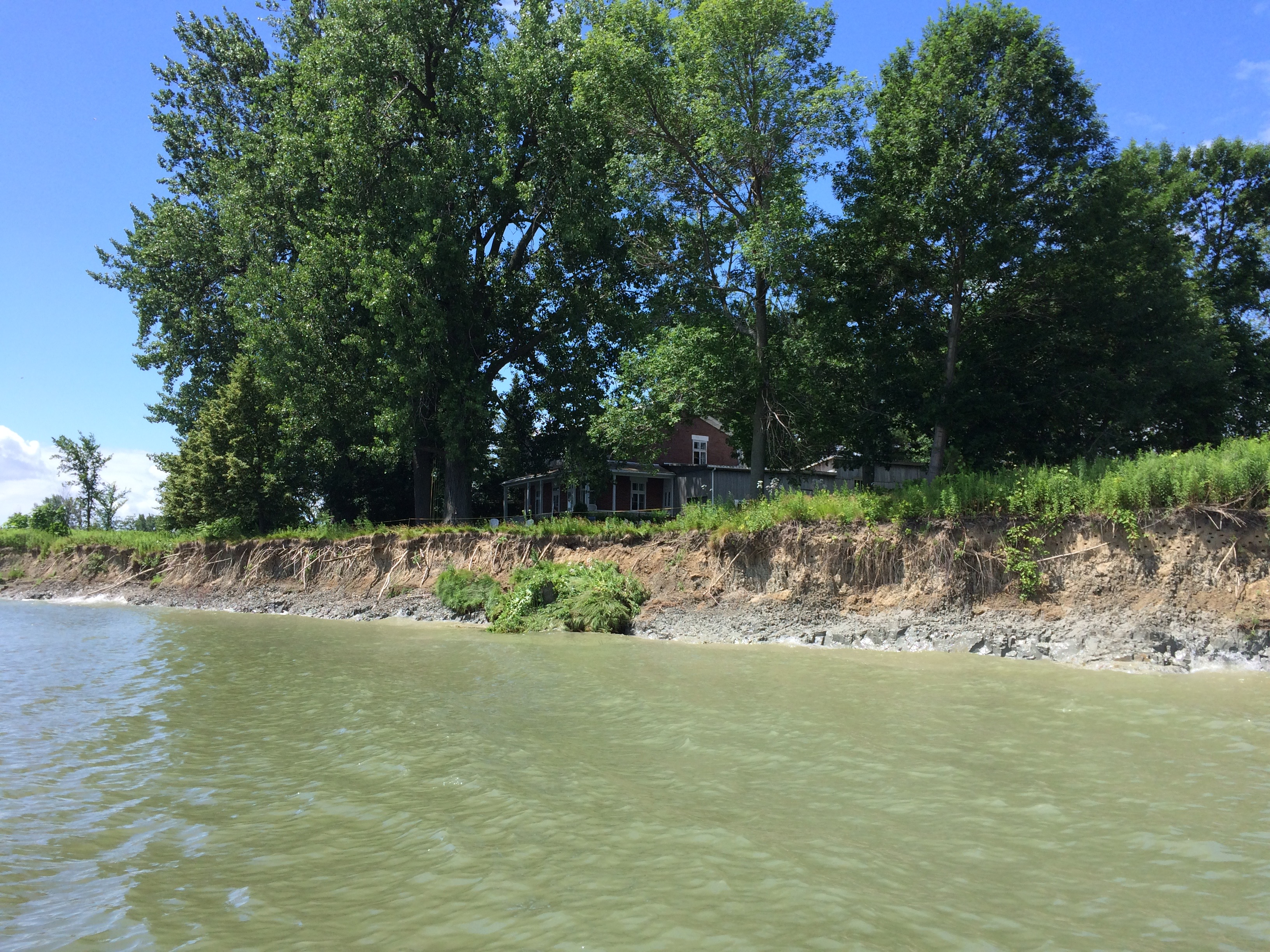
Example of banks on the island eaten away by erosion caused by the wake. The Durocher house is threatened by this erosion.

Île Sainte-Thérèse is 4.8 kilometres (3.0 mi) long and 1.6 kilometres (0.99 mi) wide. Its subsoil (limestone in the western part, shale clay in the eastern part) is covered with a layer of clay sand suitable for agriculture. The banks of the island are composed of clay and sand and are sensitive to erosion.

The 11 km perimeter area is almost uninhabited and accessible only by boat. The island is made up of agricultural land, marshes and forest. A farmer grows soybeans there. The island is surrounded by several chalets, for the most part without occupancy rights, on land belonging to the Government of Quebec. Some private properties are present such as the Durocher house which is one of the last buildings testifying to the agricultural occupation of the island.

== History ==
The first people of Sainte-Thérèse Island were the First Nations people who lived in the Saint-Laurent valley. The oldest archaeological remains found on the island date back to about 2500 years. The sites excavated in the 1980s demonstrate frequent occupation by First Nations but probably associated with short stays or halts since no trace of intensive occupation has been identified. The writings of the early days of the French colony testify that the site is used by the Iroquois since in 1665 Charles Le Moyne d'Iberville went there to hunt and was surrounded and captured there.

=== Under the French regime ===
In 1662, the island was colonized by the french. The island has an original name used by the First Nations people but as for the origin of the name Sainte-Thérèse, little is known but it is mentioned for the first time at this time and probably refers to the new queen Marie-Thérèse. Pierre Boucher mentions this island in his pamphlet of 1664. The island probably remains uninhabited by French settlers until 1667.

Michel-Sidrac Du Gué de Boisbriand, obtained in 1667 permission to settle on the island and therefore became its first historic occupant. Du Gué de Boisbriand is captain of a fireboat in the Carignan Regiment and arrived in America with the expedition Carignan-Sallière. In 1667 with the help of Jean Hayet dit Malo, Captain Du Gué cleared the island and several oak logs were shipped to the Quebec shipyard. One of the boats built with island wood will be called the Griffon.

In 1672, the Intendant Talon conceded to Du Gué de Boisbriand what became the seigneury of Île Sainte-Thérèse and which included Île Sainte-Thérèse and the neighboring islands. Du Gué de Boisbriand also has a stronghold on the western tip of the island of Montreal which will bear the name Boisbriand. Du Gué de Boisbriand was mainly occupied by his military career (he was part of several of Frontenac's expeditions) and trade (notably the trade in brandy among the Amerindians). He will reside alternately in Boisbriand and on Sainte-Thérèse Island.

In 1674, he conceded 2 lots on the west side of the island, one to Mathurin Gauthier dit Landeville and the other to Antoine Hoquet dit le Picard. In 1675, a notarial deed tells us that he rents his farm on the island to Nicolas Ragueneau and Louis Truchon dit Léveillé for a period of 5 years.

Around 1679 Du Gué de Boisbriand moved to Sainte-Thérèse Island with his wife Marie Moyen. It seems that he had a preference for the island and its landscapes and perhaps that is why he will call his first daughter Marie-Thérèse. The census of 1681 mentions that 7 children, 2 servants and a servant reside in the manor of the lord. He has 40 arpents in value, 16 head of cattle and a flour mill. The 1681 census counted 53 residents on the island divided into 14 dwellings. The residences surround the island and are located less than 40 meters from the shore.

Among these islanders is Louis Brien dit Desrochers ancestor of the Brien, Desrochers and Durocher families of America. From Ploermel in Brittany, Louis arrived in Canada a few years earlier. He was first tailor of clothing in Trois-Rivières then in Montreal where he married Suzanne Bouvier in 1681. The same year he settled on Sainte-Thérèse Island where he will have a large descendants of which several representatives will live in the island until 1952.

Also among the islanders is Jean Bousquet, who came from Tonin in Guyenne, a master gunsmith who worked at the forges of Saint-Maurice. He married Catherine Fourrier in 1672 and they settled on the island in 1680. There is also Jean Voyne (Venne) who came to the island in 1675 and who married Catherine Bousquet (daughter of Jean Bousquet). They had numerous descendants who bore the name of Venne and several of whom settled in Pointe-aux-Trembles.

The name of Nicholas Choquet is also among the first islanders, this soldier from the Carignan-Sallière regiment (1665) cultivated on the island in 1667. In 1681 he owned two acres in Varennes and he settled there and left a large number descendants bearing the names of Choquet or Choquette.

Charles Desmares is also one of them, this shoemaker from Normandy owns a farm on the island in 1681. By his son Basil, he is the ancestor of the Desmarrais of Varennes and Boucherville.

Du Gué de Boisbriand died in 1689 after a full military career, but it seems that he had financial difficulties since the inventory of his property on Sainte-Thérèse Island drawn up in 1688 suggests a neglected domain. The Captain had left his family and his lordship of Île Sainte-Thérèse in the care of his friend Charles-Gaspard Piot de Langloiserie, a French gentleman who arrived in New France in 1691 and who in the same year married the eldest daughter of Du Gué, Marie-Thérèse.

In 1695, the population of the island increased by 60% compared to the census of 1681, which testifies to the richness of the site. Gideon de Gascogne (Catalonia?) During his visit at the beginning of the 18th century mentions that "the land is good for the government to produce all kinds of grains and vegetables, aussy all the inhabitants are very comfortable there".

Jean-Sidrac Du Gué de Boisbriand, eldest son of the first lord of the island, to whom the seigniorial title belonged, sold his title to his brother-in-law, the knight Piot de Langloiserie in 1706. The latter died in 1715, leaving the lordship to the care of his wife Marie-Thérèse Piot (née Du Gué) for about a quarter of a century. The lord watched over the grain since in 1740 she obtained from the intendant Hocquart an order prohibiting free grazing on the islands around Sainte-Thérèse Island, a practice then widespread.

A land register of the island, made in 1723, has 23 locations on which stand 19 houses.

In 1742, Louis-Hector Piot de Langloiserie, eldest son of Hector and Marie-Thérèse became the new lord of the island a year before the death of his mother. From him, we know that there were discussions of marriage between him and Marguerite Du Frost de la Jammerai (who will later be known as Mère d'Youville) but that he later married Esther Bridge and lived for a time in the English colonies. In 1726 he had obtained from New York legislation the privilege of porpoise fishing and he would have resided in this state for several years before returning to Quebec. When he became lord of the island in 1742, he was an interpreter and worked with the governor in Quebec.

During the English conquest, Île Sainte-Thérèse was occupied by General Murray in 1760 to camp his troops there before taking Montreal. Murray will draw a detailed map of the island and its surroundings.

=== Under the English regime ===
After the English conquest, Louis-Hector Piot de Langloiserie lost his fief since his heritage was seized in 1778 and was awarded to John Maxwell, an English speculator, who sold it the following year to Louis-Joseph Ainsse (or Hainse) who was resident of Varennes.

Louis-Joseph Ainse had illustrated himself in the trade in Michilimakinac by allying himself by marriage to the Dakota and then as interpreter with the military. According to some the name Ainse comes from the German Heinz. Ainse, a successful trader, officially became lord of Île Sainte-Thérèse in 1781. The same year, he gave a contract to build a first windmill on the island. He died in 1802 and succeeded him as lord of the island his son Joseph Ainse who had married in 1817 Charlotte Vigneau. It is uncertain whether the two Ainse lords have resided on the island permanently or temporarily but their homes are known to them in Varennes. According to local history, an imposing stately-style residence was located at a place called "du cass" (helmet), located on the south-western tip of the island.

Children of Joseph Ainse and Charlotte Vigneau, two of his daughters will have a role in the uprising of the Patriots of 1837–38. Françoise Ainse as wife of Doctor Eugène-Napoléon Duchesnois and Zoé Ainse as wife of Amury Girod. This agronomist of Swiss origin who published several writings in the form of articles or treatises including in 1834 "Conversations on agriculture, by a inhabitants of Varennes" and in 1835 a small book called "Notes divers sur le Canada". We know that he and his wife resided on the island following Local history dictates that the Ainse manor house on Sainte-Thérèse Island housed a printing press which was used to print "La Minerve", the Patriots' journal.

With his brother-in-law Doctor Duchesnois, Girod becomes a member of the Sons of Liberty and keeps a diary in German and Italian which describes in detail the events of 1837. We know in particular that in November 1837 Papineau and Edmund Bailey O'Callaghan canoe from Pointe-Aux-Trembles to Île Sainte-Thérèse to look for Girod, but it is in Varennes the next day that they will find him and it is there that one of the decisive meetings that will have led to the armed insurrection. Girod writes in his journal: "I do not remember which one of us it was, but it seems to me it was Boucher[-Belleville] who proposed that a convention be summoned and a provisional government set up. We agreed to his proposal, but we added that this first measure amounted to an act of open rebellion and that it would be advisable to look for ways to organize the populace and obtain arms and ammunition. We were all in agreement with this proposal and began to talk about our departure." It is decided that Papineau and the others will go to fight at Saint-Charles and that Girod will go to Saint-Eustache. During the battle of Saint-Eustache he fled and he was subsequently denounced and hunted down and he committed suicide at Pointe-aux-Trembles in December 1837.

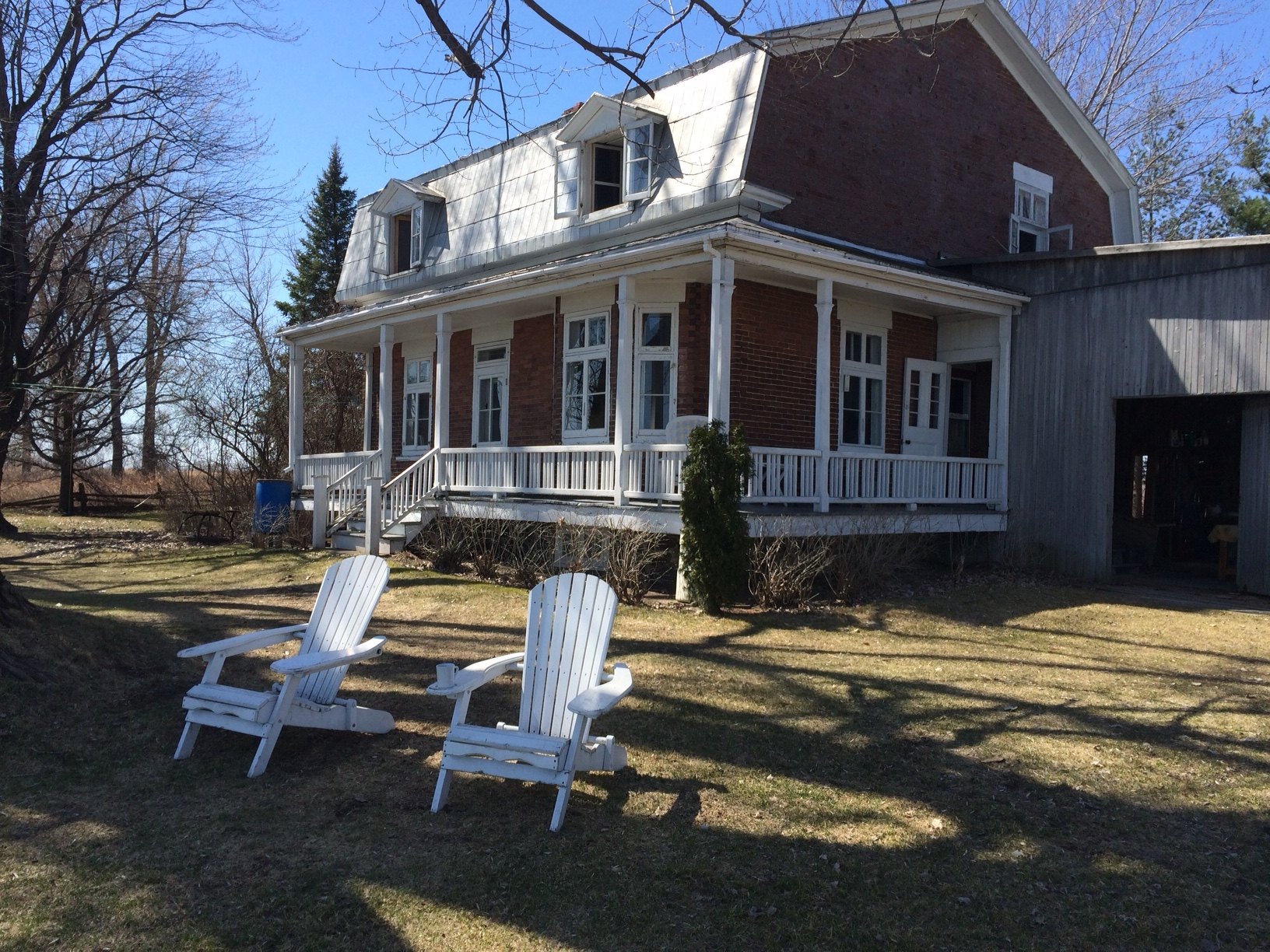
Maison Durocher, built around 1913. Farm house testifying to the agricultural occupation of Sainte-Thérèse Island.

During this first half of the 19th century there was little information on the inhabitants of the island but we know that the population on the island remains stable since between the censuses of 1723 and 1859, the number of locations and houses remains similar on the island i.e. 19. In 1841 a first school teacher was active on the island. Despite its agricultural wealth, the island having no hamlet or church, the inhabitants are dependent on the cities of Varennes and Pointe-Aux-Trembles for trade and religious and administrative affairs. The population of the island tends to decrease in the second half of the 19th century. In 1897 there were only 12 locations left on the island, 7 in 1942 and 5 in 1944. In the early 1950s, following the opening of the seaway and the passage of icebreakers which had the effect of isolating the island from the south shore in winter, the last inhabitants of the island packed up. Among them is Raoul Durocher, descendant of Louis Brien dit Desrochers and his wife Marie-Anna Provost.

In the 1950s, the island was known for its beaches on its southeast facade, notably the Choquette and Bissonnette beaches, which are served by a ferryman from Varennes and Montreal. The Beaudoin family from Pointe-Aux-Trembles operated some of these ferrymen.

In the early 1980s, a park was set up on Île Sainte-Thérèse and a ferryman brought visitors to Varennes and Pointe-Aux-Trembles. A cycle path is provided as well as rest and picnic facilities. This park will stop its activities at the end of the 1980s.

During the 2010s, a new park project was developed by the mayors of the cities of Varennes and Pointe-aux-Trembles. In 2015–2016, the Quebec Ministry of Natural Resources expelled several vacationers without the right to occupy.

== Ecology ==
Île Sainte-Thérèse, which includes a wide variety of natural environments (woodlands around the perimeter, central meadows and swamps), is considered a site of wildlife interest. In particular, there are fish such as muskellunge, birds such as heron, butor, tern and gulls, and mammals such as field vole, raccoon, red fox, long-tailed weasel and the muskrat. The swallow of shore or sand swallow is also very present on the banks of the island.

Waterfowl are also plentiful on the island and Duck Unlimited built a marsh there in the 1980s.

Île Sainte-Thérèse has been the subject of several park projects since the 1970s, but it faces many ecological challenges. Since the opening of the seaway in the 1950s, the south-eastern shores of the island have been affected by erosion caused by the mooring. In certain sectors located a few hundred meters from the seaway, it is between 1 and 2 meters from the shores that erode annually.

In the 1980s, the construction of the Rivière-des-Prairies sewage treatment plant and its emissary from Île aux Vaches, which dumps Montreal's wastewater on the southeast flank of the island, contributed to the deterioration of water quality to the point where swimming, once famous on the island, is now impossible.

== Heritage ==
The island harbours Indigenous and European archaeological sites dating from the beginning of colonization.

Several of the houses and buildings testifying to the occupation of the island are in ruins. A house built around 1913 by Noël Alias Durocher is still present and maintained by members of the Durocher family.

Several lighthouses of different sizes are located around the island.

== See also ==
- Marguerite-D'Youville Regional County Municipality
- Varennes
- Saint Lawrence River
- Hochelaga Archipelago
- List of Islands of Quebec
