= Lake Saint-Louis =

Lake in Quebec, Canada

Lake Saint-Louis Lac Saint-Louis (French)
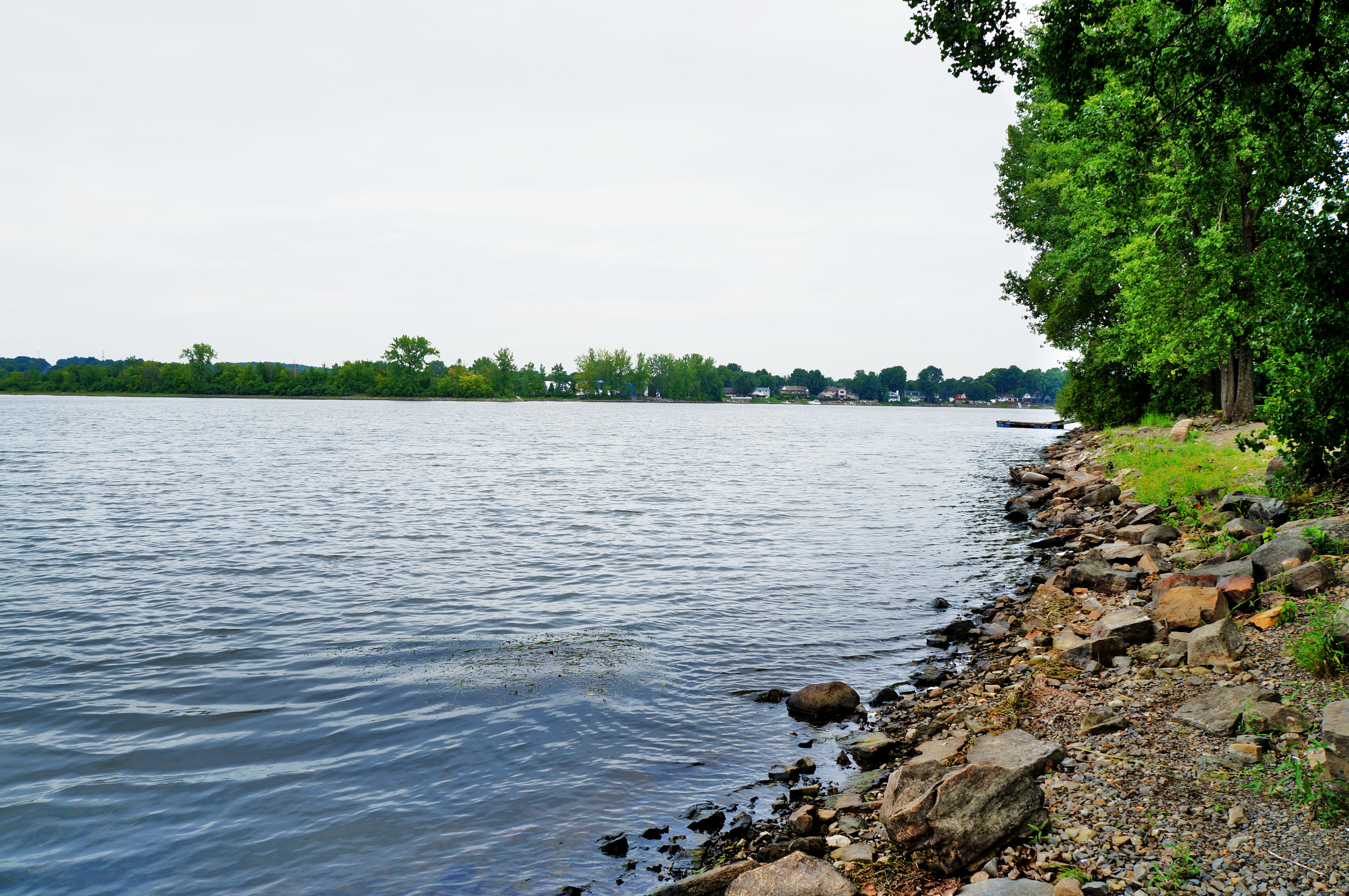
- Lake St. Louis at St-Anne-de-Bellevue looking towards Île Perrot

- Location within Quebec

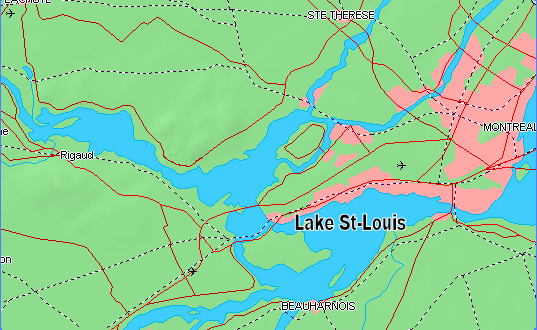
- Location map
- Location: Montérégie region, southwestern Quebec
- Coordinates: 45°24′05″N 73°48′51″W
- Type: Natural
- Primary inflows: Beauharnois Canal, Saint Lawrence River, Ottawa River, Saint-Charles River
- Primary outflows: Saint Lawrence River
- Basin countries: Canada
- Surface elevation: 21 m (69 ft)
- Settlements: Montreal

Lake Saint-Louis (French: Lac Saint-Louis, pronounced [lak sɛ̃ lwi]) is a lake in southwestern Quebec, Canada, at the confluence of the Saint Lawrence and Ottawa rivers. The Saint Lawrence Seaway passes through the lake.

Lake St. Louis is a widening of the St. Lawrence River in the Hochelaga Archipelago. It is also fed by the Ottawa River via the Lake of Two Mountains at Sainte-Anne-de-Bellevue, the Beauharnois Canal, the Soulanges Canal, the Saint-Louis River, and the Châteauguay River.

The lake is bounded to the north and the east by the Island of Montreal, by Beauharnois-Salaberry, Roussillon, and Vaudreuil-Soulanges. The town of Beauharnois with its power-dam and canal lie to the south.

The West Island shore is mostly built up with private houses, but it includes some parks and clubs such as the Pointe-Claire Canoe Club, and the Pointe-Claire Yacht Club. Islands in the lake include Dorval and Dowker Islands. Lake St. Louis is the second of three fluvial lakes on the St. Lawrence River; upstream of it is Lake Saint Francis, and downstream is Lake Saint Pierre. Lake St. Louis has an average flow of 8,400 cubic metres per second (300,000 cu ft/s).

The lake has many species of fish, including yellow perch.

A small map by Samuel Champlain of 1611 names the lake. The same year, Champlain reported that a young man named Louys was drowned in what is now known as the Lachine Rapids, and in 1870 Charles-Honoré Laverdière stated that the rapids, and later the lake, were named in honour of the drowned man. A 1656 Jesuit account describes a crossing «Lac Saint Louys».

In 2014 there was a report of fecal coliform flowing into the lake from a Beaconsfield creek, and of PCBs flowing into it from a Pointe-Claire industrial site.
