= Îles-Avelle-Wight-et-Hiam Ecological Reserve =

Coordinates: 45.4°N 73.9958°W

- IUCN category Ia (strict nature reserve)
- Interactive map of Îles-Avelle-Wight-et-Hiam Ecological Reserve
- Location: Vaudreuil-Dorion, Quebec, Canada
- Established: 1994

Îles-Avelle-Wight-et-Hiam Ecological Reserve is an ecological reserve located in Vaudreuil-Dorion, Quebec, Canada. It was established on December 9, 1994.
