= Hochelaga Archipelago =

Group of islands at the confluence of the Saint Lawrence and Ottawa Rivers

Native name: Archipel d'Hochelaga
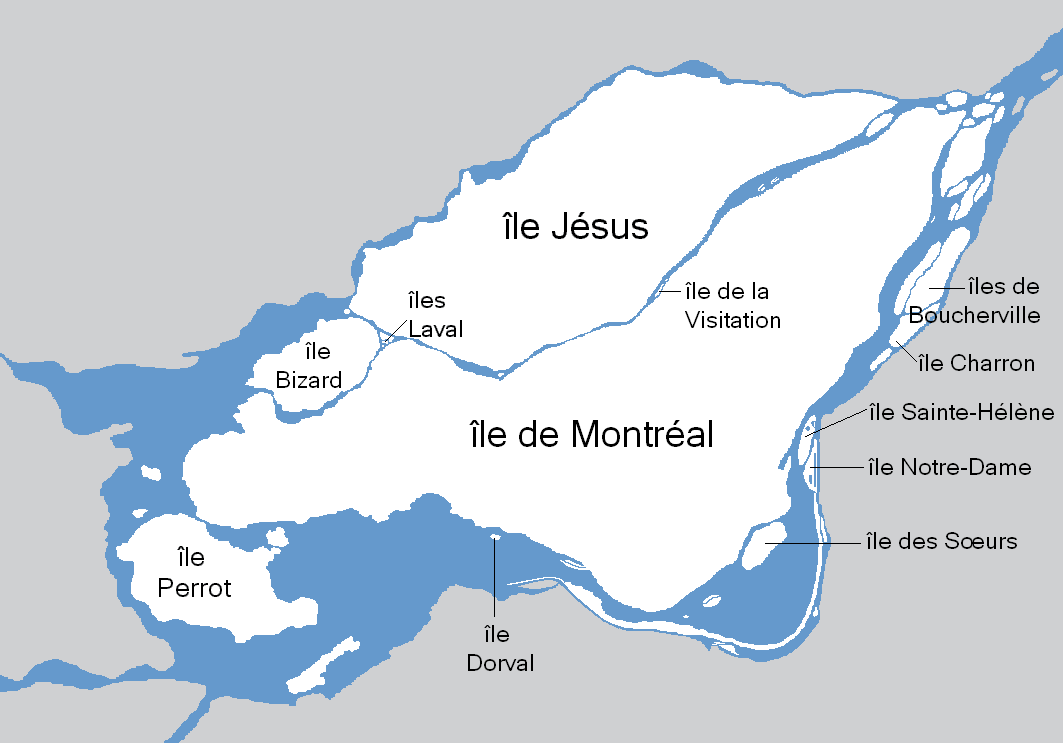
- Map of the Hochelaga Archipelago
- Interactive map of Hochelaga Archipelago

Geography
- Location: Saint Lawrence River
- Coordinates: 45°32′58″N 73°39′02″W
- Total islands: 320
- Major islands: Île de Montréal, Île Jésus, Île Perrot, Île Bizard
- Highest elevation: 234 m (768 ft)
- Highest point: Mount Royal (Island of Montreal)

Administration
- Canada
- Province: Quebec
- City: Montreal

Additional information
- Discovered in 1535 by Jacques Cartier

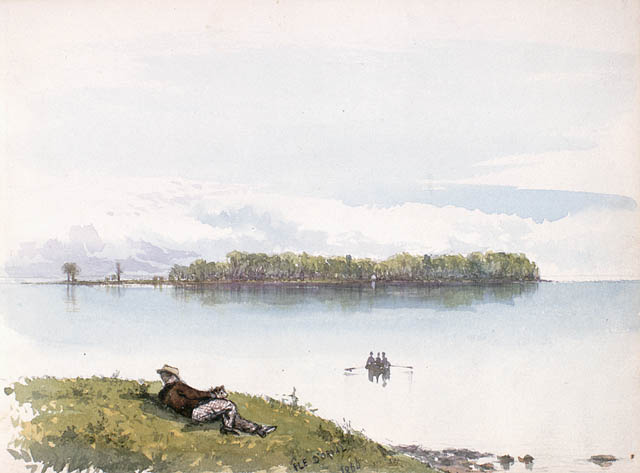
Dorval Island as painted by Frances Anne Hopkins, 1866.

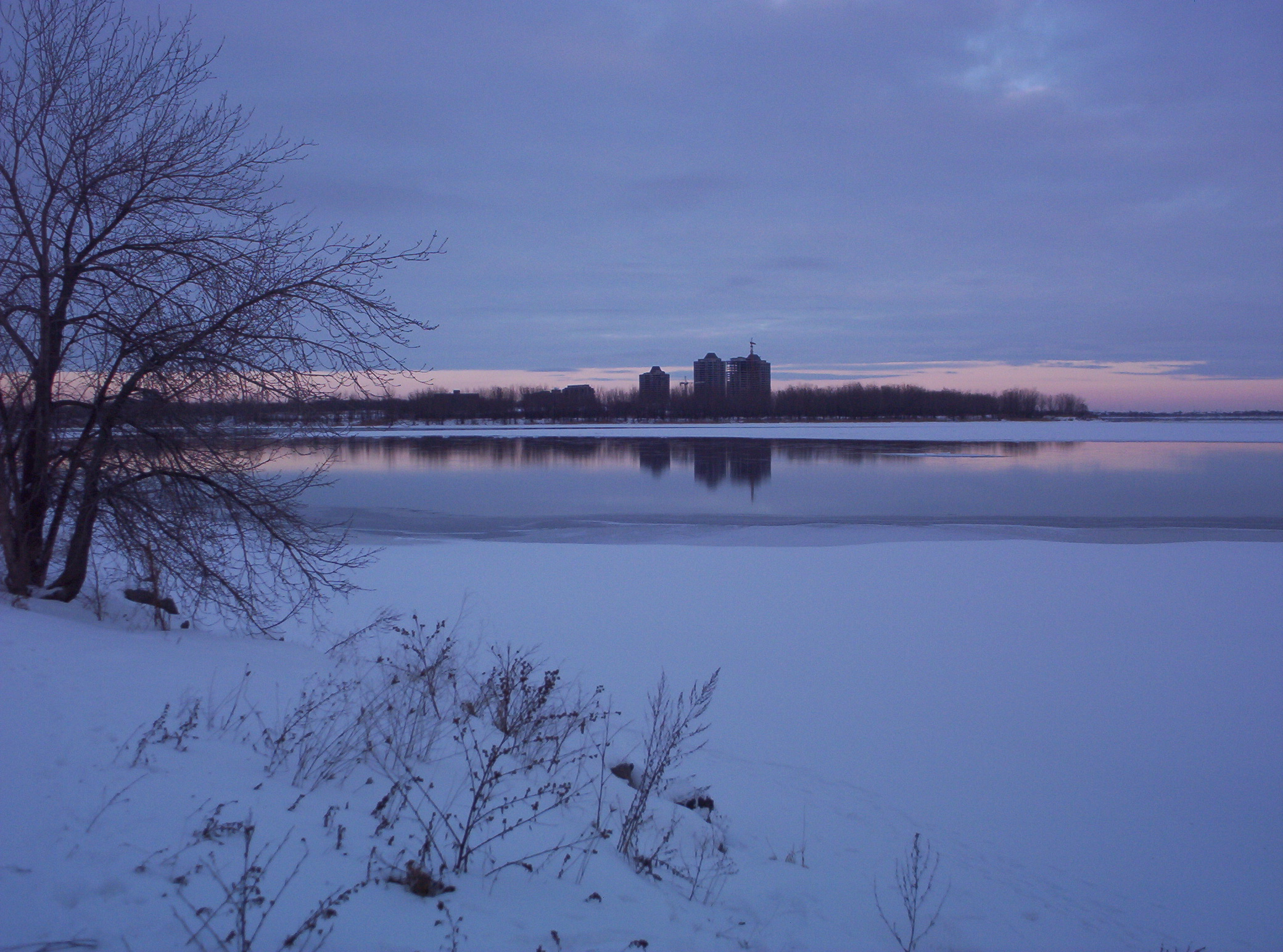
Nuns' Island at dusk.

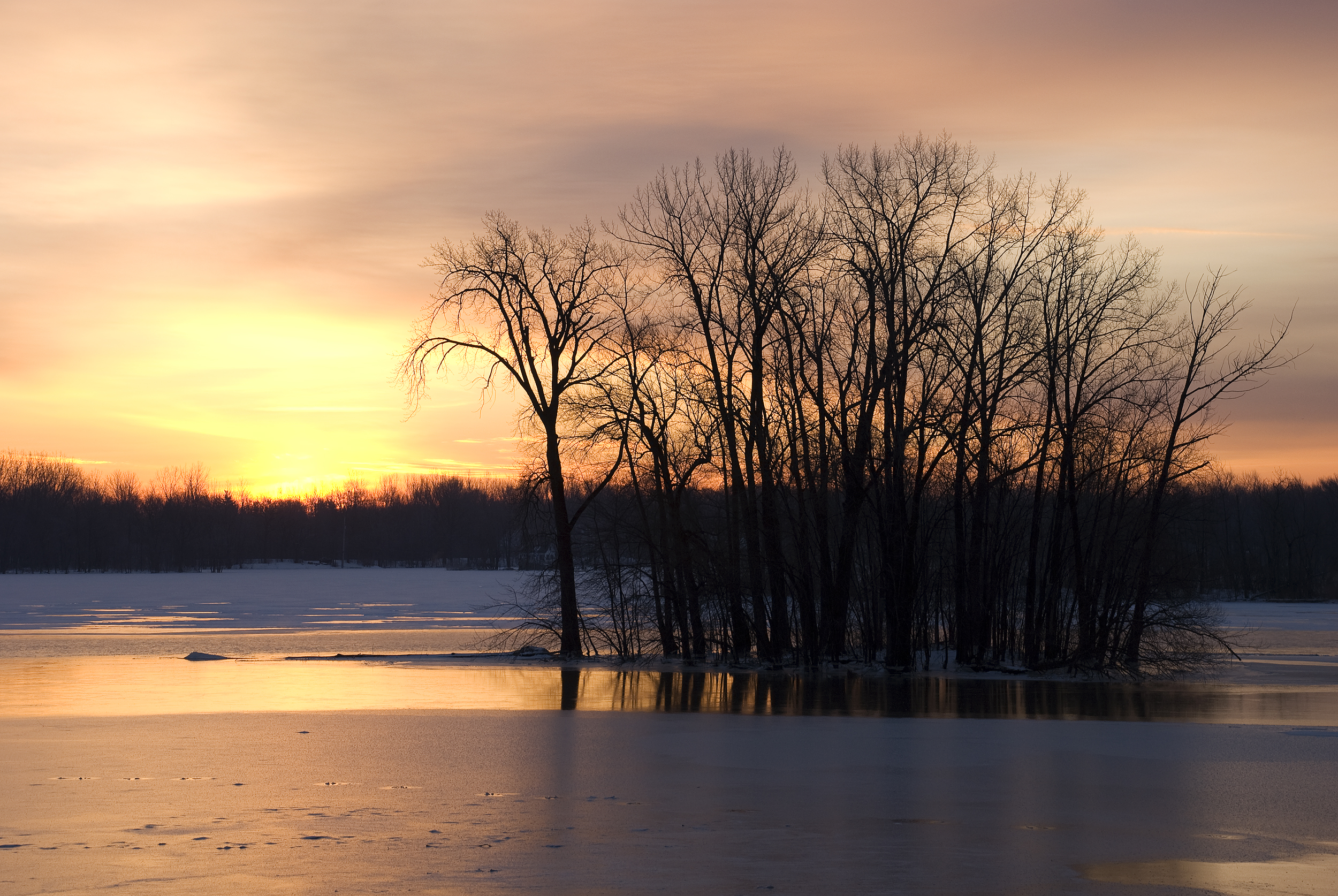
Small island near Saint-Eustache in the Rivière des Mille Îles.

The Hochelaga Archipelago (French: Archipel d'Hochelaga), also known as the Montreal Islands, is a group of approximately 320 islands at the confluence of the Saint Lawrence and Ottawa rivers in the southwestern part of the province of Quebec, Canada.

== Population ==
As of 1 July 2021, the Hochelaga Archipelago officially had 2,556,040 inhabitants in the following municipalities:

Population of the Hochelaga Archipelago:
Municipality	Population (2021)	Island of each municipality
Montréal	1,825,208	Île Bizard; Île de Montréal (part); Île Sainte-Hélène; Île Notre-Dame; Île des Sœurs
Laval	441,929	Île Jésus; Îles Laval (île Bigras, île Pariseau, île Ronde et île Verte); Île Paton
Dollard-Des Ormeaux	50,302	Île de Montréal (part)
Côte-Saint-Luc	35,117	Île de Montréal (part)
Pointe-Claire	33,714	Île de Montréal (part)
Mount Royal	21,844	Île de Montréal (part)
Westmount	21,152	Île de Montréal (part)
Kirkland	20,046	Île de Montréal (part)
Beaconsfield, Quebec	19,942	Île de Montréal (part)
Dorval	19,907	Île de Montréal (part)
Pincourt	15,109	Île Perrot (part)
L'Île-Perrot	11,455	Île Perrot (part)
Notre-Dame-de-l'Île-Perrot	11,366	Île Perrot (part)
Hampstead	7,472	Île de Montréal (part)
Montréal-Ouest	5,300	Île de Montréal (part)
Sainte-Anne-de-Bellevue	5,048	Île de Montréal (part)
Montréal-Est	4,094	Île de Montréal (part)
Baie-D'Urfé	3,944	Île de Montréal (part)
Terrasse-Vaudreuil	1,985	Île Perrot (part)
Senneville	973	Île de Montréal (part)
L'Île-Cadieux	128	Île Cadieux
L'Île-Dorval	30	Île Dorval
Total	2,556,040	Hochelaga Archipelago

== Size ==
Estimates of the number of islands in the archipelago vary. The most widely accepted number seems to be 320, although the number has been put as high as 325.

== Islands ==
The largest island in the group is the Island of Montreal, which contains most of the city of Montreal and the central section of its metropolitan area. The city has jurisdiction over 74 smaller islands in the archipelago, most notably Nuns' Island (also known as Île des Sœurs in French), Île Bizard, and the two islands that served as the site of Expo 67, namely Saint Helen's Island (in French Île Sainte-Hélène) and the artificial Île Notre-Dame.

The second-largest island in the archipelago is Île Jésus, which along with the Îles Laval and several smaller islands makes up the city of Laval.

Other islands include the Îles de Boucherville, featuring a Québec National Park, Île Perrot, Salaberry-de-Valleyfield and the neighbouring Grande-Île, as well as the smaller Dorval Island and Dowker Island.

=== List of named islands ===
- Île à l'Aigle
- Île Avelle
- Île Barwick
- Île Béique
- Île Bellevue
- Île Bizard
- Île au Bois Blanc
- Île Bonfoin
- Îles de Boucherville, including:
  - Île Charron
  - Île de la Commune
  - Île Dufault
  - Île Grosbois
  - Île Lafontaine
  - Île Montbrun
  - Île à Pinard
  - Île Saint-Jean
  - Île Sainte-Marguerite
  - Île Tourte Blanche
  - Île aux Raisins
- Île Bourdon
- Île Boutin
- Île Cadieux
- Île aux Canards
- Île aux Chats
- Île aux Cerfeuils
- Île aux Chèvres
- Île aux Plaines
- Île Claude
- Île Daoust
- Île Deslauriers
- Île Dixie
- Île Dorval
- Île Dowker
- Île au Foin
- Île Gagné
- Île Hiam
- Île Hog
- Île Jasmin
- Île Jésus
- Île Lamontagne
- Île Lapierre
- Îles Laval, including:
  - Île Bigras
  - Île Pariseau
  - Île Ronde
  - Île Verte
- Île Madore
- Île Ménard
- Île Mercier
- Île Migneron
- Île Mitan
- Île de Montréal
- Île du Moulin de Saint-François
- Île aux Moutons
- Île Notre-Dame
- Îles de la Paix, including:
  - Île au Diable
  - Île du Docteur
  - Île à Tambault
  - Île à Thomas
  - Île aux Veaux
- Île Paton
- Île aux Plaines
- Île Perrot
- Île Perry
- Île de Pierre
- Île aux Pins
- Île aux Pruches
- Îles des Rapides de Lachine or Îles du Sault-Saint-Louis, including:
  - Île aux Hérons
  - Île aux Chèvres
  - Île au Diable
  - les Sept-Soeurs
  - Île aux Sternes
- Île Roussin
- Île de Roxboro
- Île Saint-Joseph
- Île Saint-Laurent
- Île Sainte-Hélène
- Île Saint-Pierre
- Île Sainte-Thérèse
- Île Serre
- Île des Sœurs (aka as Nuns' Island in English)
- Île Sunset
- Île Todd
- Île aux Tourtes
- Île du Tremblay
- Île à la Truie
- Île aux Vaches
- Îles de Varennes
- Île Vert
- Île de la Visitation
- Île Wight

== Name ==
The archipelago takes its name from Hochelaga, an Iroquoian settlement on the Island of Montreal that was later settled by the French and grew to become the modern city of Montreal.

== See also ==
- Montreal Archipelago Ecological Park
- Thousand Islands
