= Laval-sur-le-Lac =

Coordinates: 45°32′15.8″N 73°52′0.8″W

Laval-sur-le-Lac (French pronunciation: [laval syʁ lə lak]) is a small sector on the western part of Laval and was a separate city until the municipal mergers on August 6, 1965. This community contains North America's oldest French speaking private golf club, Le Club Laval-sur-le-Lac, established in 1917. The seasonal Laval-sur-le-Lac–Île-Bizard Ferry, which does not operate in winter, connects Laval-sur-le-Lac with Île Bizard.

== Geography ==
It is bordered by Laval-Ouest, Sainte-Dorothée to the east and the Rivière des Prairies (Lake of Two Mountains) to the west.

In 2006, it has been ranked the richest neighborhood in the Province of Quebec with an estimated average household income of over $325,000 per year.

== Education ==
Commission scolaire de Laval operates French-language public schools.

Sir Wilfrid Laurier School Board operates English-language public schools.

- Hillcrest Academy in Chomedey
- All sections of Laval are zoned to Laval Junior Academy and Laval Senior Academy

== Language ==
88% of the residents are fluent in English.
