= Île Perrot =

- Island
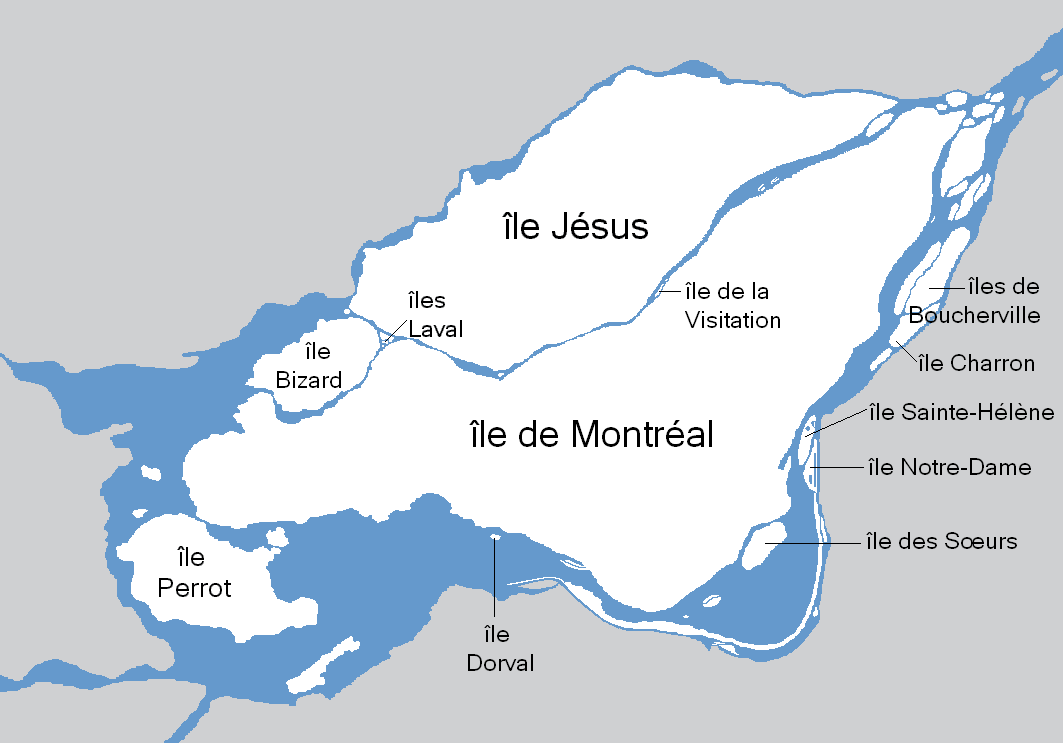
- Map of the Hochelaga Archipelago, with Île Perrot at left

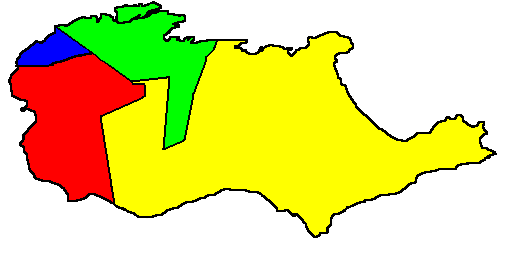
- Île Perrot, showing its municipalities: Green: Ville de l'Île-Perrot; Yellow: Notre-Dame-de-l'Île-Perrot; Red: Pincourt; Blue: Terrasse-Vaudreuil
- Coordinates: 45°21′01″N 73°54′09″W
- Country: Canada
- Province: Quebec
- Region: Montérégie
- RCM: Vaudreuil-Soulanges

Area
  - Land: 41.94 km^{2} (16.19 sq mi)

Population (2021)
  - Total: 39,915
  - Density: 951.7/km^{2} (2,465/sq mi)
- Time zone: UTC-5 (Eastern (EST))
  - Summer (DST): UTC-4 (EDT)
- Postal code span: J7V, J7W
- Area codes: (514) and (438)

Île Perrot (French pronunciation: [il pɛʁo]) is an island west of the island of Montreal in the Canadian province of Quebec. Part of the Hochelaga Archipelago, the island lies between Lake Saint-Louis and Lac des Deux-Montagnes. The island was granted by the Intendant Talon of New France to its founder François-Marie Perrot then-Governor of Montreal on 28 October 1672.

Nearly 40,000 people live in one of Île Perrot's four municipalities:

- Notre-Dame-de-l'Île-Perrot
- Pincourt
- Terrasse-Vaudreuil
- L'Île-Perrot

It is part of the Vaudreuil-Soulanges Regional County Municipality of the Montérégie region. This is the only off-island suburban area of Montreal to use Montreal's own 514 area code, with all others being allocated to 450. The island is connected to Sainte-Anne-de-Bellevue, on the West Island of Montreal, via the Galipeault Bridge.

Île Perrot holds the only working windmill in Quebec, dating from the time Île-Perrot was a seigneury in the French colony of New France. The windmill and associated miller's house were designated a National Historic Site in 1969, and a Historic Monument under provincial heritage legislation in 1977. In the windmill's honour, what now constitutes the commercial artery of the island was named boulevard Don-Quichotte.

== Geology and soils ==
The island is underlain by Cambrian-age quartzite. Angular blocks of this hard rock are visible on the surface over much of the island. The soil is a stony sandy loam podzol which has developed on acidic, nutrient-poor quartzite till. Over parts of the island, this till is covered with clay which is nutrient-rich and much less stony, but poorly drained and classified as gleysol.

== Vegetation ==
Part of the island remains in forest, although housing developments have made significant inroads over recent years. Deciduous trees such as American beech, sugar maple, red maple, northern red oak, white ash, bitternut hickory and American basswood are dominant. The vegetation is more luxuriant than one would expect from the nature of the soils, and includes a great diversity of wildflowers.

== See also ==
- List of islands of Quebec
