= Sainte-Dorothée, Quebec =

Coordinates: 45°32′N 73°49′W

Sainte-Dorothée (French pronunciation: [sɛ̃t dɔʁɔte]) is a district in Laval, Quebec. It was a separate city until the municipal mergers on August 6, 1965.

The Sainte-Dorothée that was known for forest and farmlands is no longer what it used to be. It took a giant transformation during the last decade with the arrival of SmartCentre (formerly Mega Centre) Sainte-Dorothée and Mega Centre Notre-Dame. It began with the construction of Canadian Tire, IGA & followed with the first Wal-Mart Canada in the western Laval area. The expansion has never stopped since. It now has almost every major department store, restaurant, hundreds of boutiques and two locations open 24 hours. The area also saw a rise in demand for residential development, possibly due to the "Mega Mall" alongside the Highway 13 or the other way around as the mall was built to accommodate the growing number of families looking for affordable homes near the Montreal area. Given the proximity of Ste-Dorothée to Pierrefonds, Saint-Laurent, the rest of Montreal and major highways, it was only a matter of time that it would be developed.

A small seasonal cable ferry carries cars across the Rivière des Prairies from Sainte-Dorothée to Île Bizard (part of Montreal).

In 2016, the district had a population of 65,890 people.

== Geography ==
Sainte-Dorothée is delimited west by Laval-sur-le-Lac, north-west by Laval-Ouest, north-east by Fabreville, east by Chomedey and south by the Rivière des Prairies and Îles Laval.

== Education ==
Commission scolaire de Laval operates Francophone public schools.

- École primaire Jean-Lemonde
- École primaire Les Trois-Soleils
- École primaire Paul-VI
- École primaire Pierre-Laporte
- École primaire Saint-François
- École primaire Sainte-Dorothée

Sir Wilfrid Laurier School Board operates Anglophone public schools. All portions of Laval are zoned to Laval Junior Academy and Laval Senior Academy.

== Religion ==
The Roman Catholic Sainte-Dorothée church and parish are located in Sainte-Dorothée.

== Notable people ==
- Denyse Benoit, actor, director and screenwriter
