= Île Jésus =

Large river island in Quebec, Canada

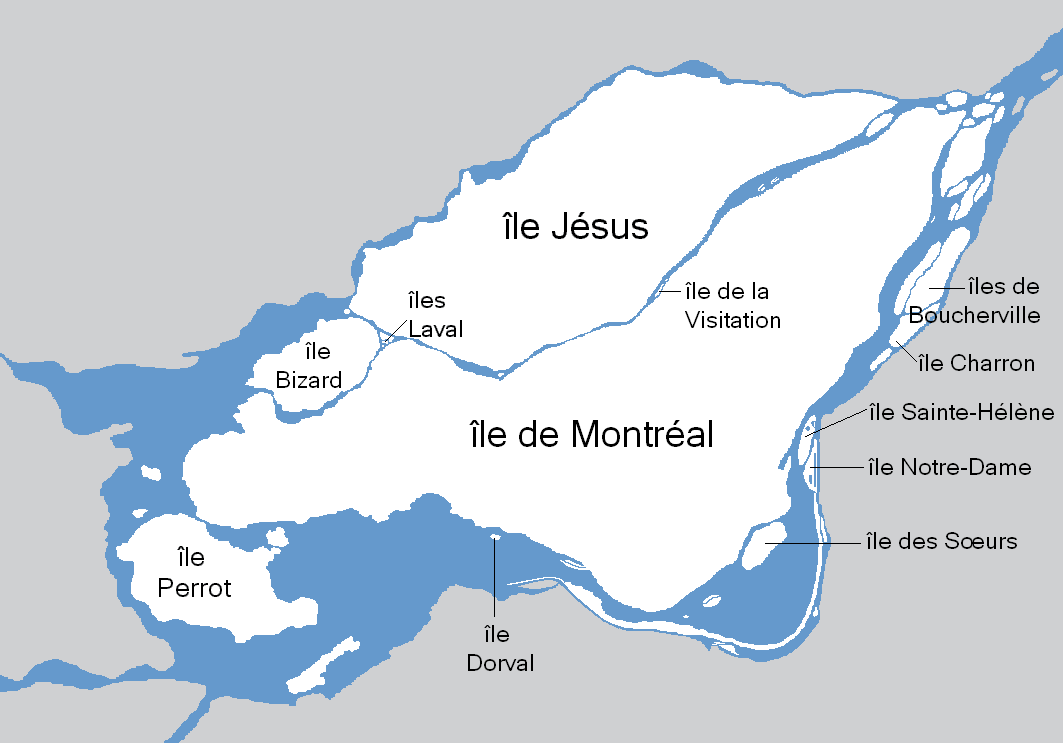
- Map of the Hochelaga Archipelago, with Île Jésus at the north

- Location within Quebec

Geography
- Location: Rivière des Prairies; Rivière des Mille Îles
- Coordinates: 45°35′N 73°45′W
- Archipelago: Hochelaga Archipelago
- Area: 242 km^{2} (93 sq mi)

Administration
- Canada
- Province: Quebec
- City: Laval

Demographics
- Population: 422,993 (2016)

Île Jésus (French: [il ʒezy], Jesus Island) is a river island in southwestern Quebec, separated from the mainland to the north by the Rivière des Mille Îles, and from the Island of Montreal to the south by the Rivière des Prairies. It is the second-largest island (242 km^{2} or 93 sq mi) in the Hochelaga Archipelago (after the Island of Montreal), and the fourth most populous island in Canada, with more than 420,000 residents as of 2016.

Île Jésus is the major component of the City of Laval, along with the Îles Laval and several other islands. The island has a considerable rural portion, with most of the urban area in the central region and along the south and west river banks.

== Former cities ==
- Auteuil
- Chomedey
- Duvernay
- Fabreville
- Îles Laval
- Laval-Ouest
- Laval-des-Rapides
- Laval-sur-le-Lac
- Pont-Viau
- Saint-François
- Saint-Vincent-de-Paul
- Sainte-Dorothée
- Sainte-Rose
- Vimont

== See also ==
- Olivier Charbonneau
- List of islands of Quebec
