= François-Marie Perrot =

Governor of Montreal and Governor of Acadia

- Born: 1644; Paris
- Died: October 20, 1691; Paris
- Occupation(s): Governor of Montreal (1670–84); Governor of Acadia (1684–87)
- Spouse: Madeleine Laguide Meynier
- Children: 6

François-Marie Perrot (French pronunciation: [fʁɑ̃swa maʁi pɛʁo]; 1644–1691) was born in Paris and Seigneur de Sainte-Geneviève.

== Biography ==
He was appointed governor of Montreal by a royal commission in 1670 and arrived in New France that year. Records do show his tenure as 1669–84.

In 1669 he married Madeleine Laguide Meynier, a niece of Jean Talon, and by her he had six children. Through Talon's influence he obtained the appointment as governor of Montreal from the seigneurs of the island, the Messieurs de Saint-Sulpice, succeeding Paul de Chomedey de Maisonneuve.

On October 29, 1672, he was granted the island that now bears his name (Île Perrot to the west of Montreal Island) as a seignory.

Perrot was the governor of Acadia from 1684–87. He was replaced by Louis-Alexandre des Friches de Meneval.
