= Île Bizard =

Island in Montreal, Quebec, Canada

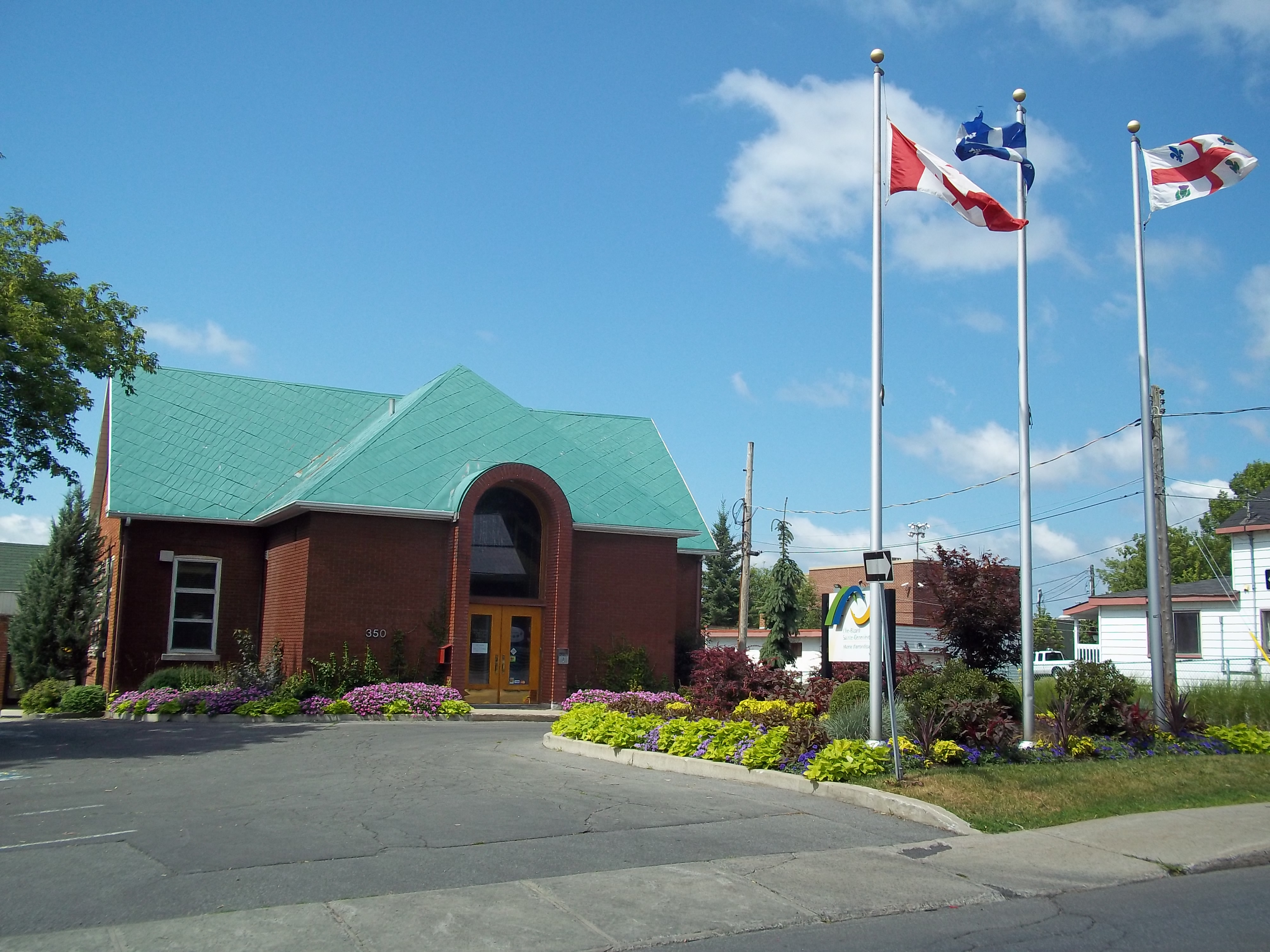
- Borough Hall of Île-Bizard

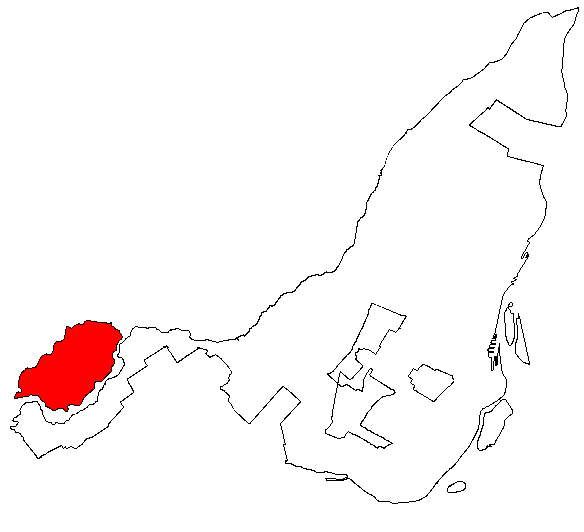
- Île Bizard within the city of Montreal

Geography
- Location: Lake of Two Mountains Rivière des Prairies
- Coordinates: 45°29′N 73°54′W
- Archipelago: Hochelaga Archipelago
- Area: 22.78 km^{2} (8.80 sq mi)

Administration
- Canada
- Province: Quebec
- City: Montreal
- Borough: L'Île-Bizard–Sainte-Geneviève

Demographics
- Population: 14,713 (2016)
- Pop. density: 645.87/km^{2} (1672.8/sq mi)

Île Bizard (French pronunciation: [il bizaʁ]) is an island near the Island of Montreal in the Hochelaga Archipelago region. It is one of the three populated islands within the city of Montreal, along with the Island of Montreal and Nuns' Island (Île des Soeurs). The island is served by buses 207 and 227.

== History ==
Historically named Île Bonaventure, by 1723 it had come to be named Île Bizard, after Jacques Bizard, to whom it was conceded as a fief in 1678, part of the seigneurial system of New France. The island was also used by the settlers of New France, as a way to get timber into Montreal from the river using timber rafting.

=== Modern ===
It was formerly a separate municipality named Saint-Raphaël-de-l'Île-Bizard, but was forcefully merged with of the city of Montreal, and made into the borough of L'Île-Bizard–Sainte-Geneviève. A referendum to demerge on June 20, 2004 was held. Although more than 50% voted to demerge, it was unsuccessful as this represented fewer than the required 35% of the electorate.

== Geography ==
The Guy Lafleur Bridge connects it across the Rivière des Prairies with Sainte-Geneviève on the Island of Montreal. The seasonal Laval-sur-le-Lac–Île-Bizard Ferry provides a connection to Laval-sur-le-Lac on Île Jésus (Laval). This ferry does not operate in the winter.

=== Land use ===
Bois-de-l'Île-Bizard Nature Park is a 201-hectare (500 acre) park which contains marsh lands and several kilometres (miles) of nature trails, accessible year round. There is also a small beach at Pointe-aux-Carrières that faces the Lac des Deux-Montagnes. The Royal Montreal Golf Club, the Golf Saint-Raphael and Elm Ridge Country Club are located on the island.

Land has been reserved on the island for the future extension of Autoroute 440 from Laval to connect with Autoroute 40 at Chemin Ste-Marie. This will avoid having to drive on the Autoroute 40 to get to Autoroute 13 and Autoroute 15 and provide another beltway around the city in addition to Autoroute 30 on the South Shore. Many people who live on the island are against it, as Île Bizard is a calm and serene country environment and they feel like it would cause more traffic and pollution to the fresh air.

The City of Montreal has purchased considerable amounts of land and protects them as nature parks, which include swamps, beaches, forests and other ecosystems; these are open to the public.

== Sports ==
The island has two notable sports complexes: 'Parc Eugène-Dostie' and 'Complexe Sportif Saint-Raphaël'. The PGA Golf Tour comes to l'Île Bizard's Royal Montreal golf course every few years. A notable native is Vincent Lecavalier, a former NHL player who was raised on the island. Former NHL player Guy Carbonneau also lives on the island, as did Guy Lafleur. CFL player Marc-Antoine Dequoy, a defensive back with the Montreal Alouettes, was born and raised there.

Former NHL player and 2018 Pyeongchang Olympic bronze medalist Marc-André Gragnani was also born and raised on the island.

== See also ==
- List of bridges spanning the Rivière des Prairies
- List of crossings of the Rivière des Prairies
- List of islands of Quebec
