= Laval-sur-le-Lac–Île-Bizard Ferry =

Seasonal cable ferry in Canada

Coordinates: 45.5200°N 73.8693°W

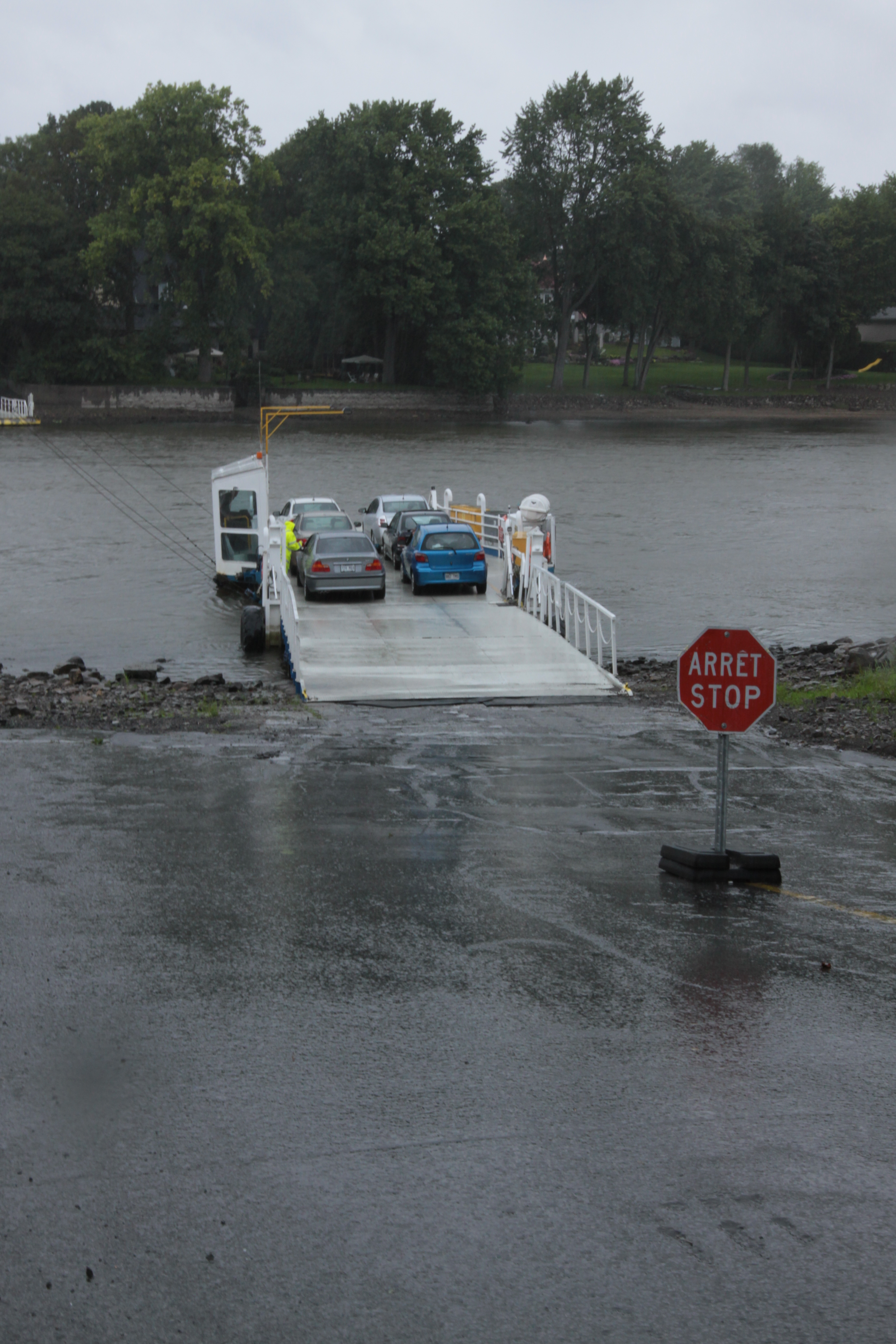
Laval-sur-le-Lac–Île-Bizard Ferry

The Laval-sur-le-Lac–Île-Bizard Ferry is a seasonal reaction ferry, crossing the city limits of Montreal in the Canadian province of Quebec. It carries cars, bicycles and pedestrians across the Rivière des Prairies from Laval-sur-le-Lac to Île Bizard.

The ferry carries a maximum of 34 passengers and 6 vehicles 200 m (656 ft) across the river in 3 minutes using its current as the motive force.

As of 2024 season, the cost for automobiles is CAD $6.

== See also ==
- List of crossings of the Rivière des Prairies
