= Lake of Two Mountains =

Part of the Ottawa River in Quebec, Canada

- Lac des Deux Montagnes (French)
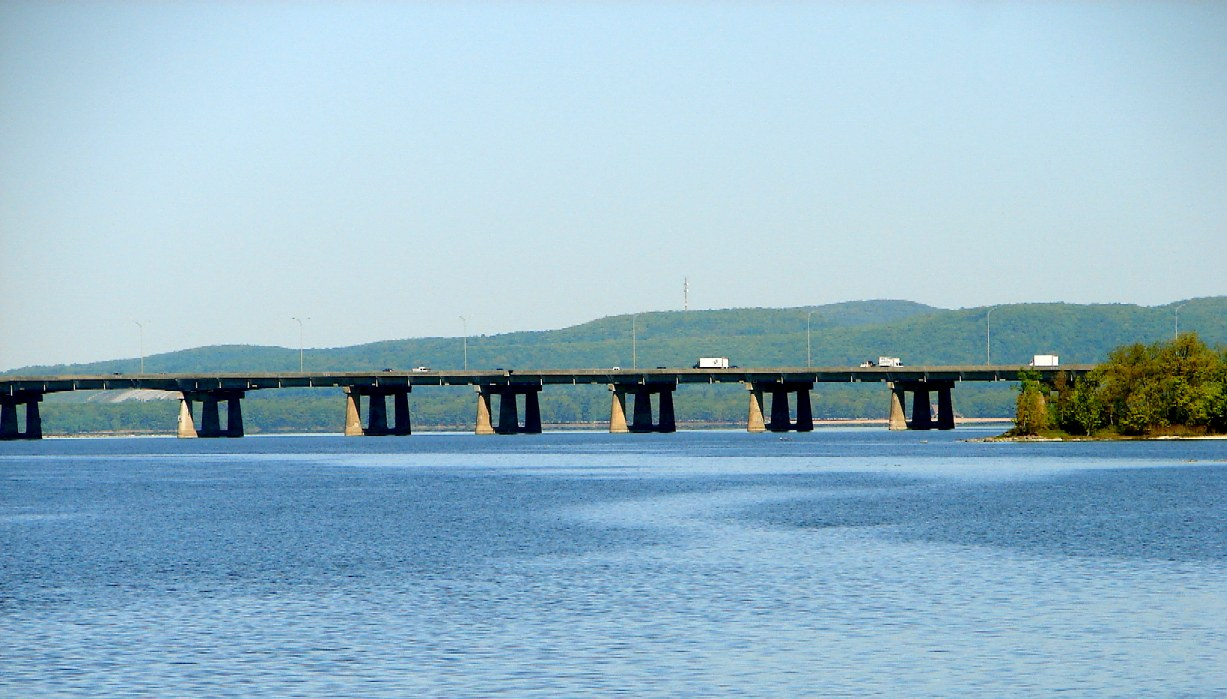
- Île aux Tourtes Bridge across Lake of Two Mountains, with Mont Oka in the background

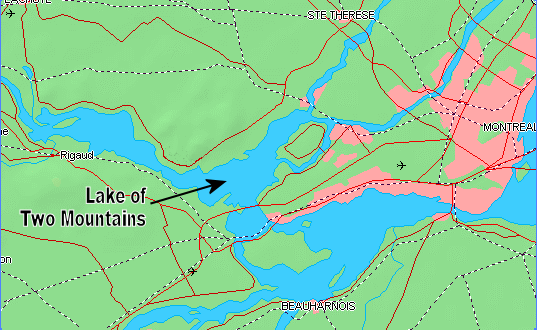
- Location map of Lake of Two Mountains

- Location within Quebec
- Location: Deux-Montagnes RCM / Vaudreuil-Soulanges RCM / Montreal, Quebec
- Coordinates: 45°27′03″N 74°00′00″W
- Primary inflows: Ottawa River
- Primary outflows: Rivière des Mille Îles, Rivière des Prairies
- Basin countries: Canada

Lake of Two Mountains (French: Lac des Deux Montagnes) is part of the river delta widening of the Ottawa River in Quebec, Canada, at its confluence with the St. Lawrence River. Situated in the Laurentians, the village of Oka is located on the north shore with Oka National Park adjacent to the east and can be accessed by Quebec Route 344.

Lake of Two Mountains has four outflows: Rivière des Mille Îles and Rivière des Prairies, bordering Île Jésus, and two branches of the Ottawa River, flowing into the St. Lawrence via Lake Saint-Louis, on either side of Île Perrot.

The city of Deux-Montagnes is located on the lake's north shore, where it flows into Rivière des Mille Îles. The southwest portion of the city of Montreal borders the eastern part of the lake, as does the village of Senneville. The Mohawks of Kanesatake have their main reserve on the northern shore of the lake at Kanesatake (Kanehsatà:ke).

The lake was named lac des Médicis in 1612 by French explorer Samuel de Champlain, then renamed lac des Soissons about 1632. By around 1684 French colonists named it as Lac des Deux Montagnes. The name refers to Calvaire Mountain and Saint-Joseph-du-Lac Hill, the two highest peaks of Mont Oka that face the lake on its northern shore.

On July 13, 1954, the Lake of Two Mountains boating accident occurred; a motorboat carrying 17 children from the Negro Community Centre of Montreal capsized in the lake, and 12 of the children, aged 6 to 11, drowned in the lake, making it one of the worst boating accidents in Canadian history.

== See also ==
- List of crossings of the Ottawa River
