= Island of Montreal =

Island in Quebec, Canada

Island of Montreal Île de Montréal (French)
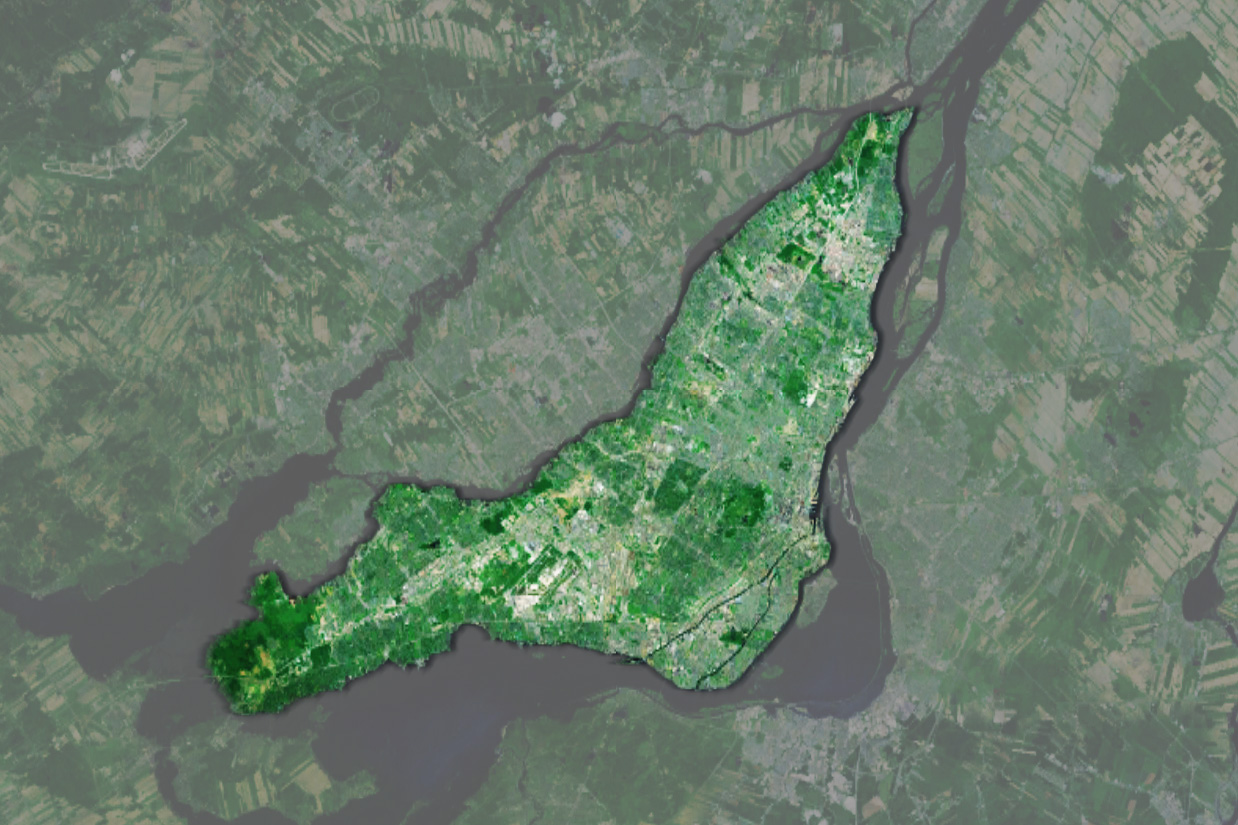
- Satellite image of the Island of Montreal

- Location within Quebec

Geography
- Location: Saint Lawrence River
- Coordinates: 45°30′01″N 73°38′47″W
- Archipelago: Hochelaga Archipelago
- Area: 472.55 km^{2} (182.45 sq mi)
- Length: 50 km (31 mi)
- Width: 16 km (9.9 mi)
- Highest elevation: 233 m (764 ft)
- Highest point: Mount Royal

Administration
- Canada
- Province: Quebec
- City: Montreal

Demographics
- Population: 2,004,265 (2021)
- Population rank: 38th
- Pop. density: 4,022.3/km^{2} (10417.7/sq mi)
- Languages: French (Quebec French); English (Quebec English, Canadian English); Quebec Sign; Mohawk; Arabic; Spanish; Italian
- Ethnic groups: French Canadians (Québécois); British Canadians; Irish Canadians; Italian Canadians; Black Canadians; Arabs; Latin Americans; Chinese (incl. Taiwanese); Indigenous Canadians (incl. Mohawk, Inuit, Métis)

Additional information
- Time zone: Eastern Standard Time (UTC–5)
  - Summer (DST): Eastern Daylight Time (UTC–4)

The Island of Montreal (French: Île de Montréal, [il d(ə) mɔ̃ʁeal]) is an island in southwestern Quebec, Canada, which is the site of a number of municipalities, including most of the city of Montreal, and is the most populous island in Canada as well as the world's most populous freshwater island. It is the main island of the Hochelaga Archipelago at the confluence of the Saint Lawrence and Ottawa rivers.

== Name ==
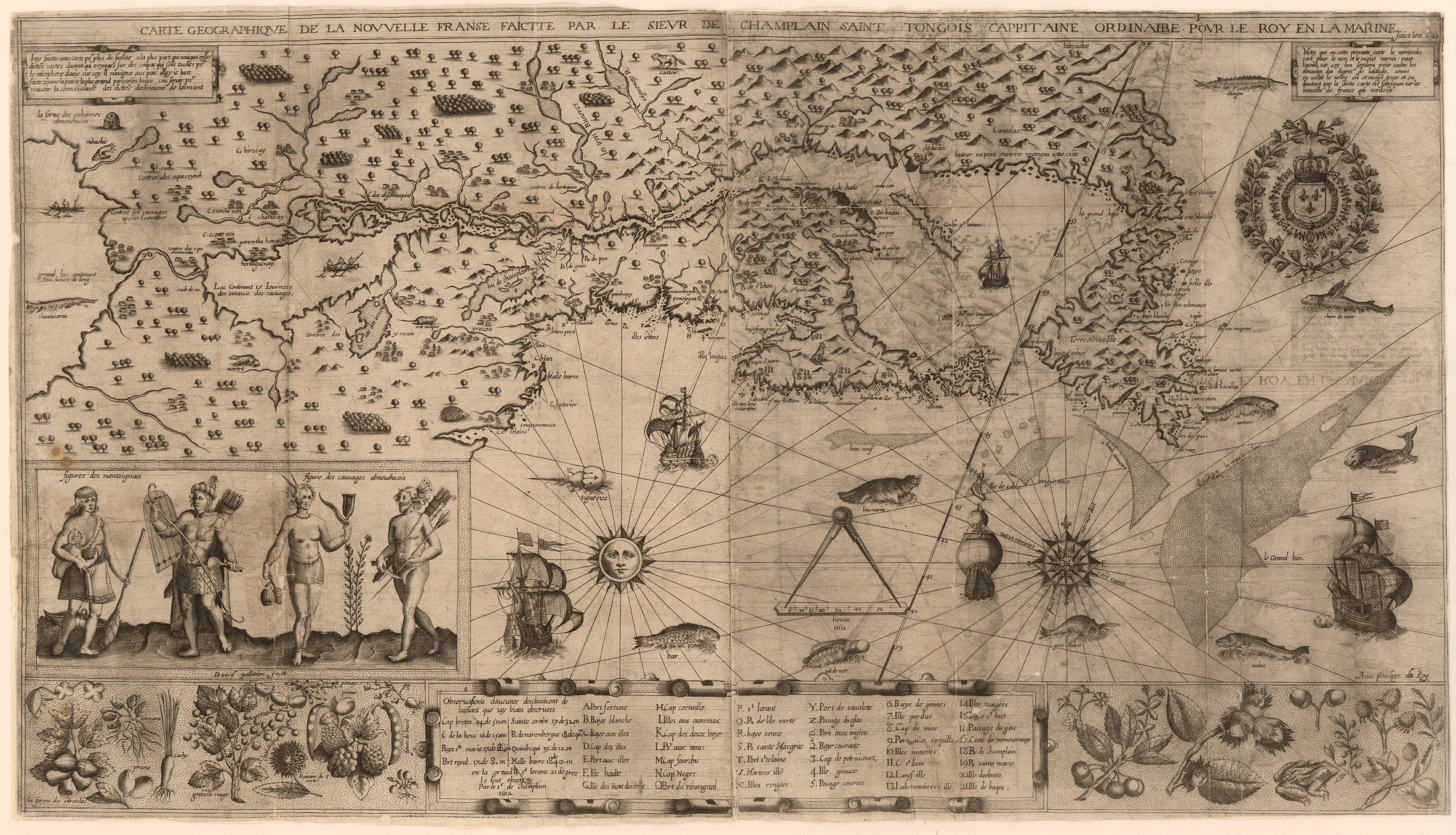
Map of New France (Champlain, 1612). "Montreal" is visible on the map next to a mountain in the approximate location. A more precise map was drawn by Champlain in 1632.

The first French name for the island was l'ille de Vilmenon, noted by Samuel de Champlain in a 1616 map, and derived from the sieur de Vilmenon, a patron of the founders of Quebec at the court of Louis XIII. However, by 1632 Champlain referred to the Isle de Mont-real in another map. The island derived its name from Mount Royal (French Mont Royal, then pronounced [mɔ̃ ʁwajal]), and gradually spread its name to the town, which had originally been called Ville-Marie.

In Kanien’kéha, the island is called Tiohtià:ke tsi ionhwéntsare ('broken in two', referring to the Lachine Rapids to the island's southwest) or Otsirà:ke (meaning 'on the fire'). In Ojibwe, the land is called Mooniyaang, named for the first stop in the great Anishinaabe migration from Dawnland (the Maritimes) to the Great Lakes.

== Physical geography ==
The island is approximately 50 km (31 mi) long and 16 km (9.9 mi) wide at its widest point, and has a shoreline of 266 km (165 mi). It is the second largest island in the Saint Lawrence River, after Anticosti Island in the Gulf of Saint Lawrence. The Island of Montreal is the largest island in the Hochelaga Archipelago, which is formed by the confluence of the Ottawa and St. Lawrence rivers.

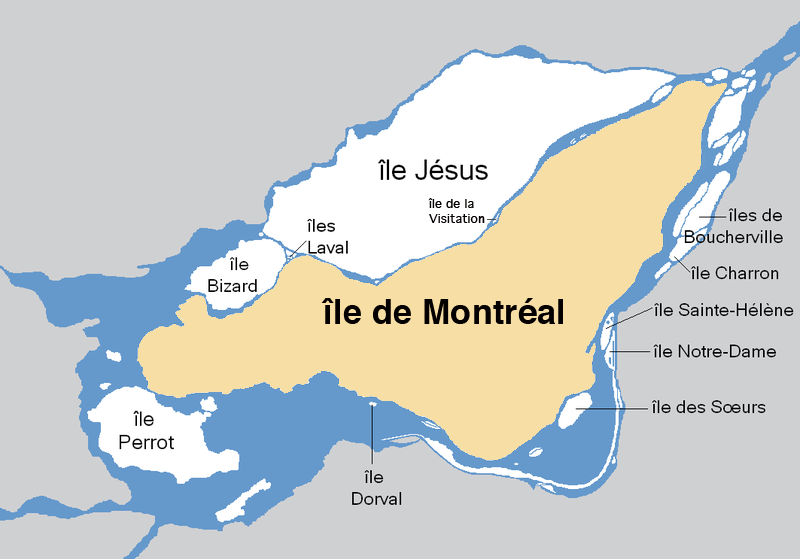
The Island of Montreal is a croissant-shaped island, part of the Hochelaga Archipelago.

Near the Ottawa shore at the western end of island, the Ottawa River widens into Lac des Deux-Montagnes. A natural watercourse there, between the island and Île Perrot, has been improved by the island's Sainte-Anne-de-Bellevue Canal. These waterways, connecting Lac des Deux-Montagnes with Lake Saint-Louis, constitute one of the places where the Ottawa flows into the St. Lawrence.

North of the island's western end, Lac des Deux-Montagnes flows into Rivière des Prairies, still part of the Ottawa. The Prairies separates the island from the other major part of the Hochelaga Archipelago including Île Bizard and Île Jésus. After coursing about 55 km (34 mi), the Prairie, at the northeastern tip of the island, joins the St. Lawrence.

The St. Lawrence coast of the island faces a variable waterway. In the southwest, the St. Lawrence River widens into Lake Saint-Louis as it approaches the island. Around a southern point near the center of the island, the St. Lawrence narrows into the Lachine Rapids, then widens into the Bassin de La Prairie past that southern point, and narrows again at the Montreal neighborhood of Cite Du Havre before flowing towards Quebec City and the Atlantic Ocean. The Lachine Canal on the island bypasses this complex part of the river. Neighboring islands in the St. Lawrence include Saint Helen's Island, Notre Dame Island, and Nuns' Island.

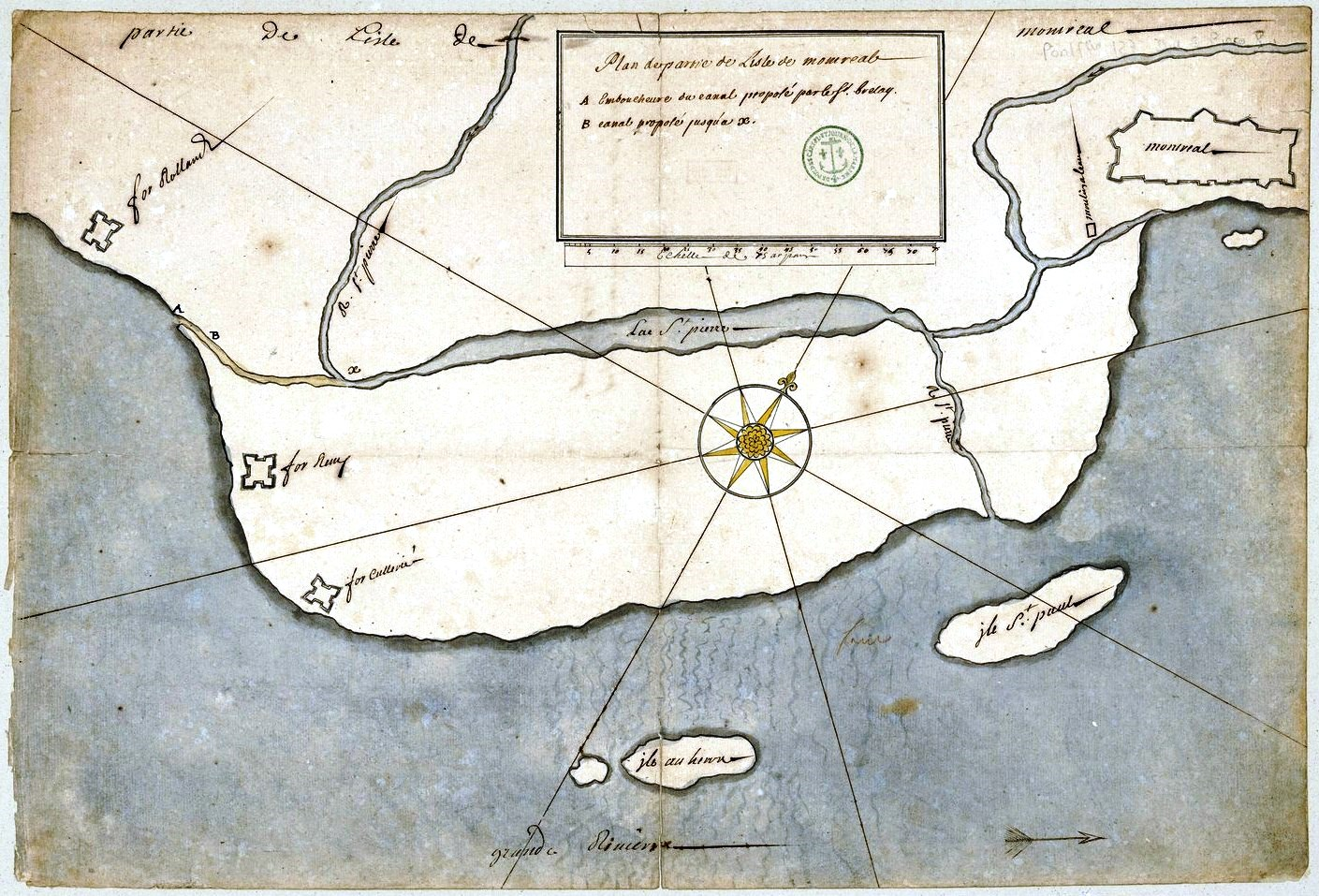
18th-century map of Lake St Pierre

The topography of the island has been significantly altered by human activity, as evidenced by historical maps that name a lake St. Pierre in the island. This lake, and several other watercourses, have been drained or covered over as the city developed, while areas on the island's shores have been reclaimed and extended. The southwest of the island is separated by the Lachine Canal between Lachine and Montreal's Old Port; this portion of the island is partially divided further by the Canal de l'Aqueduc, running roughly parallel to the Lachine Canal, beginning in the borough of LaSalle and continuing between the boroughs of Le Sud-Ouest and Verdun.

Most of the bedrock of the island consists of Chazy limestone, with some Utica shale. At the centre of the island stand the three peaks of Mount Royal, a volcanic intrusion (not an extinct volcano, contrary to popular belief). This short mountain (elevation 233 metres (764 feet) is a member of, and gives its name to, the Monteregian Hills.

== Human geography ==
The island of Montreal is the major component of the territory of the city of Montreal, along with Île Bizard, Saint Helen's Island, Notre Dame Island, Nuns' Island, and some 69 smaller islands. With a population of 2,014,221 inhabitants (22% of the population of Québec), it is by far the most populous island in Canada. It is also the 6th most populous island of the Americas and the 37th most populated island on Earth, with a similar population to Flores or Manhattan. In addition, it is the world's most populous island surrounded by fresh water. Montreal and the other municipalities on the island compose the administrative region of Montréal. The area of the Urban agglomeration of Montreal, which includes the Island of Montreal and several other smaller islands, is 499 km^{2} (193 sq mi).).

The crossings which connect the island to its surroundings are some of the busiest bridges in the country and the world. The Champlain Bridge and the Jacques Cartier Bridge together accommodate 101 million vehicle crossings a year.

== Municipalities ==
- Baie-D'Urfé
- Beaconsfield
- Côte-Saint-Luc
- Dollard-des-Ormeaux
- Dorval
- Dorval Island (Note: Although technically an island itself, Dorval Island is one of the 16 municipalities that makes up the island of Montreal.)
- Hampstead
- Kirkland
- Montreal
- Montréal-Est
- Montréal-Ouest
- Mount Royal
- Pointe-Claire
- Sainte-Anne-de-Bellevue
- Senneville
- Westmount

== Demographics ==
Island of Montreal: Population by year
1876	1890	1931	1941	1951	1961	1971	1981	1991	1996	2001	2006	2011
est. 120,000	est. 200,000	1,003,868	1,116,800	1,320,232	1,747,696	1,959,180	1,760,122	1,775,871	1,775,846	1,812,723	1,854,442	1,886,481

== Transportation ==
The island of Montreal is a hub for the Québec autoroute system, and is served by Québec autoroutes A-10 (known as the Bonaventure Expressway on the island of Montreal), A-15 (aka the Decarie Expressway south of the A-40 and the Laurentian autoroute to the north of it), A-13 (aka autoroute Chomedey), A-20, A-25, A-40 (part of the Trans-Canada Highway system, and known as "The Metropolitan" or simply "The Met" in its elevated mid-town section), A-520, and R-136 (aka the Ville-Marie autoroute). Many of these autoroutes are frequently congested at rush hour. However, in recent years, the government has acknowledged this problem and is working on long-term solutions to alleviate the congestion. One such example is the extension of Quebec Autoroute 30 on Montreal's south shore, which will serve as a bypass. Today's existing highways have been planned in the 1960s as part of a grid like transport system.

Notably, turning right on red on the island is prohibited, and signage at entry points to the island indicates as such.

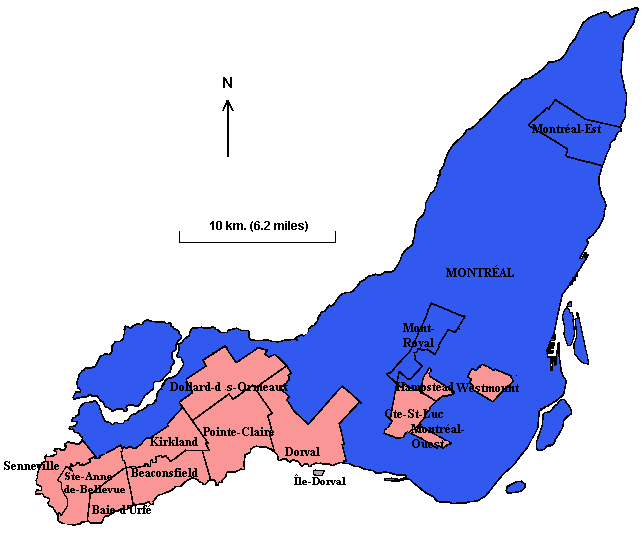
Language demographics of the municipalities of the Island of Montreal. In blue, the municipalities where the main language is French; in pink, the municipalities where the most used language is English

== Politics ==
=== Provincial riding ===
- Westmount–Saint-Louis (Liberal Held)
- Mont-Royal–Outremont (Liberal Held)
- Notre-Dame-de-Grâce (Liberal Held)
- Nelligan (Liberal Held)
- Marquette (Liberal Held)
- Pointe-aux-Trembles (Coalition Avenir Québec held)
- Robert-Baldwin (Liberal Held)
- Jacques-Cartier (Liberal Held)
- D'Arcy-McGee (Liberal Held)

== See also ==
- List of islands of Quebec
- List of rivers and water bodies of Montreal Island
