= List of parks in Montreal =

The following is a partial list of parks in Montreal, Quebec Canada.

== Large parks ==
There are currently 21 large parks in Montreal, with a combined area of 2,000 hectares (4,900 acres). Eight of the parks are considered nature parks. The "Network of Large Parks" consists of precious natural areas recognized for their biodiversity and beauty. Some of the large parks also contain historic homes acquired by the City of Montreal.

- Angrignon Park (97 ha (240 acres))
- Des Rapides Park (30 ha (74 acres))
- Dieppe Park (7 ha (17 acres))
- Frédéric-Back Park (48 ha (120 acres))
- Jarry Park (36 ha (89 acres))
- Jeanne-Mance Park (14 ha (35 acres))
- Jean Drapeau Park (209 ha (520 acres))
- La Fontaine Park (36 ha (89 acres))
- Maisonneuve Park (80 ha (200 acres))
- Mount Royal Park (190 ha (470 acres))
- Promenade Bellerive Park (22 ha (54 acres))
- René-Lévesque Park (14 ha (35 acres))
- Tiohtià:ke Otsira’kéhne Park (Outremont Summit) (35 ha (86 acres))

=== Nature parks ===
- L'Anse-à-l'Orme Nature Park (196 ha (480 acres))
- Cap-Saint-Jacques Nature Park (302 ha (750 acres))
- Bois-de-l'Île-Bizard Nature Park (201 ha (500 acres))
- Bois-de-Liesse Nature Park (159 ha (390 acres))
- Bois-de-Saraguay Nature Park (97 ha (240 acres))
- L'Île-de-la-Visitation Nature Park (34 ha (84 acres))
- Pointe-aux-Prairies Nature Park (261 ha (640 acres))
- Ruisseau-De Montigny Nature Park (22 ha (54 acres))

The City of Montreal has a plan to combine several of the nature parks, as well as a couple of other parks, into the Grand Parc de l'Ouest.

== Other major parks ==
- Ahuntsic Park
- Athena Park
- Dante Park
- Des Meubliers Park
- J.J. Gagnier Park
- Marguerite Bourgeoys Park
- Olympic Park
- Oxford Park (Georges-Saint-Pierre Park)
- Rapides du Cheval Blanc Park
- Riverside Park
- Rutherford Park
- Sir Wilfrid Laurier Park

== Urban squares ==
The following is a partial list of urban squares in Montreal.

- Cabot Square
- Chaboillez Square
- Champ de Mars
- Dorchester Square
- Le Parterre
- Peace Park
- Place d'Armes
- Place des Arts
- Place des Festivals
- Place des Montréalaises
- Place du Canada
- Place d'Youville
- Place Émilie-Gamelin
- Place Jacques-Cartier
- Place Jean-Paul Riopelle
- Phillips Square
- Saint Henri Square (Saint Henri Park)
- Sir George-Étienne Cartier Square
- Square des Frères-Charon
- Saint-Louis Square
- Sun Yat-sen Park
- Victoria Square
- Vauquelin Square
- Viger Square

== Protected areas ==
- Heron Island Bird Sanctuary

== Amusement parks ==
- Belmont Park (1923–1983)
- Dominion Park (1906–1937)
- Six Flags: La Ronde
