= L'Île-Bizard, Quebec =

L'Île-Bizard
- Former city
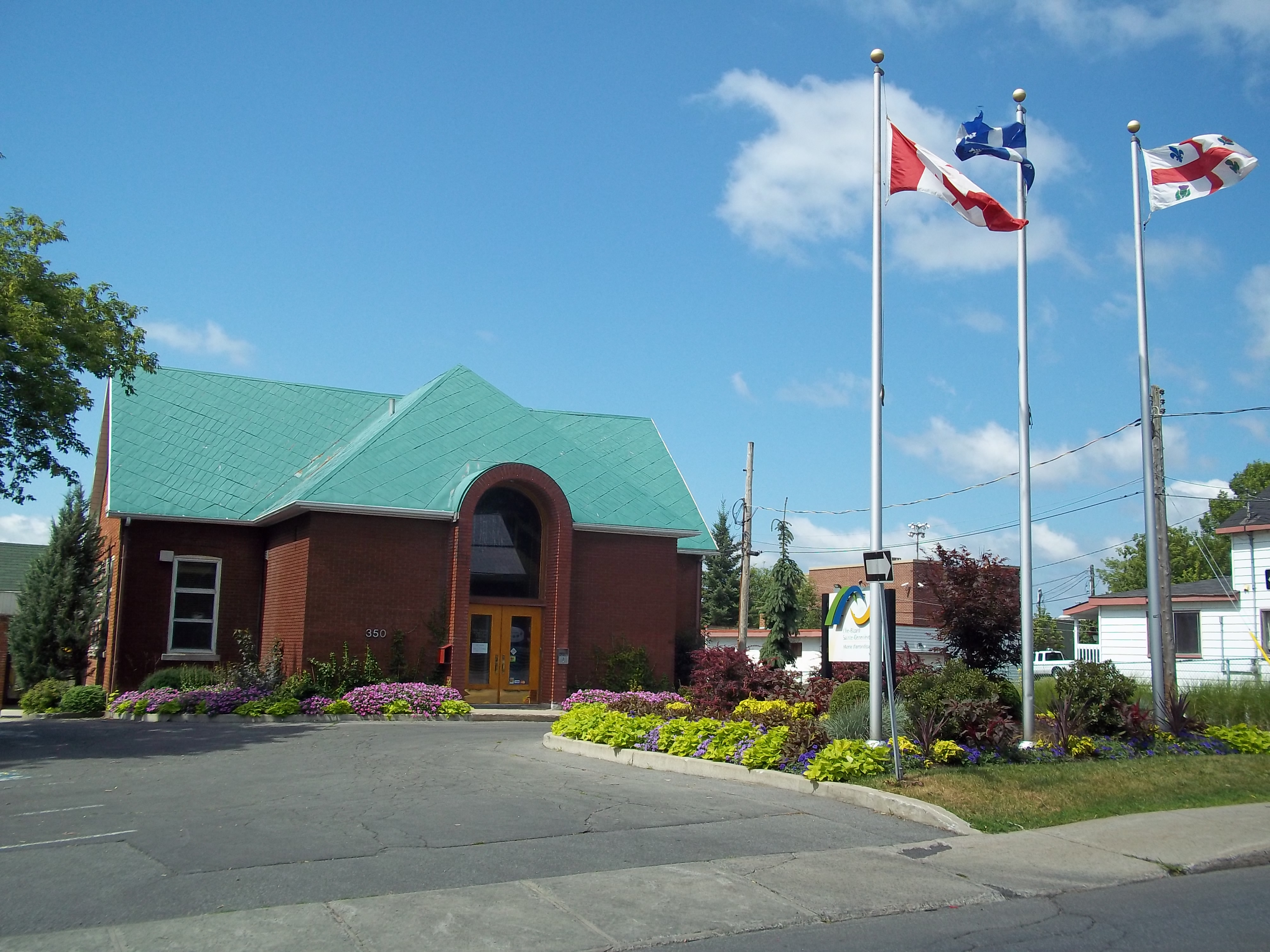
- Former town hall of L'Île-Bizard

- Location of L'Île-Bizard in Montreal
- Coordinates: 45.487417°N 73.879917°W
- Country: Canada
- Province: Quebec
- City: Montreal
- Borough: L'Île-Bizard–Sainte-Geneviève

Area
  - Land: 22.77 km^{2} (8.79 sq mi)

Population (2011)
  - Total: 14,647
  - Density: 643.26/km^{2} (1,666.0/sq mi)
  - Change (2006-2011): ▲2.2%
  - Dwellings (2011): 5,228
- Time zone: UTC-5 (Eastern (EST))
  - Summer (DST): UTC-4 (EDT)
- Forward sortation area: H9C, H9E
- Area codes: (514) and (438)

L'Île-Bizard (French pronunciation: [lil bizaʁ]) is a former municipality current borough located on Île Bizard, an island northwest of the Island of Montreal. It was originally incorporated as a municipality on 1 July 1855 as Paroisse de Saint-Raphaël-de-l'Île-Bizard.

On 1 January 2002, it was merged into the City of Montreal as part of the borough of L'Île-Bizard–Sainte-Geneviève.

The island has a land area of 22.77 km^{2} (8.79 sq mi). Its population was 14,647 at the 2011 census.

Parc-Nature-du-Bois-de-l'île-Bizard is located in the centre of the island.

It is the childhood home of NHL hockey players Justin Hryckowian and Vincent Lecavalier. Lecavalier attended John Rennie High School, a school well known for its athletics program.

The Parti Québécois leader Pauline Marois had a $8M main residence in the area. She is currently building another home on the island.

== Demographics ==
Historical populations
Year	Pop.	±%
1740	17	—
1813	508	+2888.2%
1831	799	+57.3%
1851	950	+18.9%
1861	1,070	+12.6%
1881	831	−22.3%
1901	682	−17.9%
1911	586	−14.1%
1916	574	−2.0%
1931	712	+24.0%
1954	1,046	+46.9%
1961	3,379	+223.0%
1971	2,950	−12.7%
1981	6,558	+122.3%
1991	11,352	+73.1%
1996	13,038	+14.9%
2001	13,861	+6.3%
2006	14,325	+3.3%
2011	14,647	+2.2%

== See also ==
- List of former cities in Quebec
- Montreal Merger
- Municipal reorganization in Quebec
