= Rivière à l'Orme =

Rivière à l’Orme English: Elm River
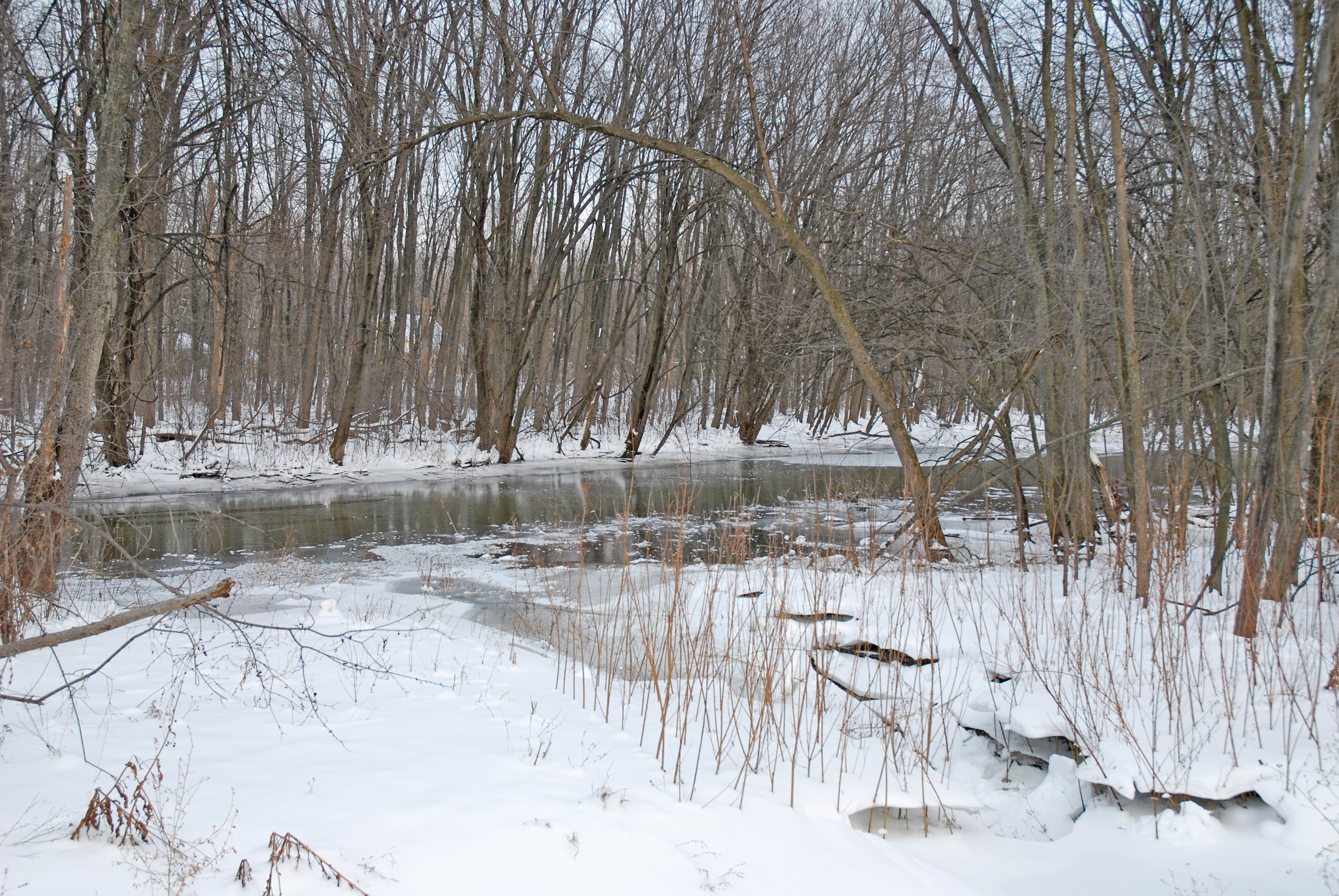

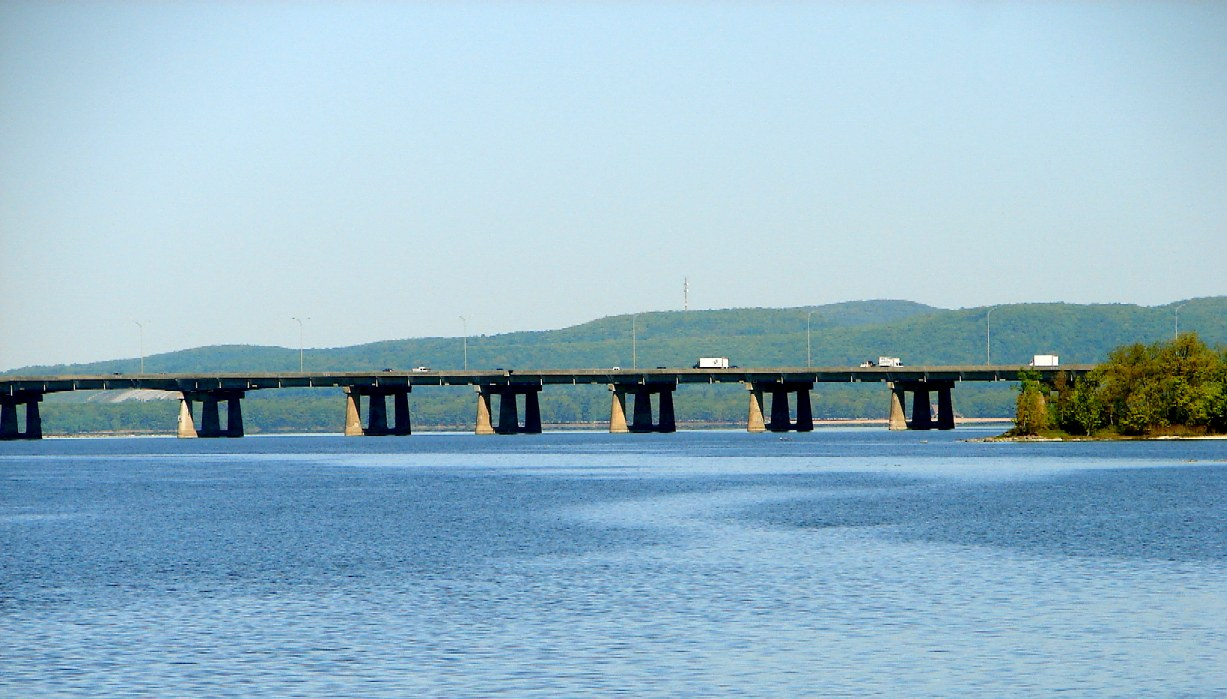
- Île aux Tourtes Bridge across Lake of Two Mountains, with Mont Oka in the background

Location
- Country: Canada
- Province: Quebec
- Region: Montreal

Physical characteristics
- Source: Urban creek
  - location: Pierrefonds, Quebec, Montreal, Quebec
  - coordinates: 45°26′35″N 73°53′07″W
  - elevation: 31 m (102 ft)
- Mouth: Lac des Deux Montagnes (anse à l’Orme)
  - location: Senneville, Quebec, Montreal, Quebec
  - coordinates: 45°27′01″N 73°56′17″W
  - elevation: 23 m (75 ft)
- Length: 5.1 km (3.2 mi)

The Rivière à l'Orme (English: Elm River) is a tributary of the Lac des Deux Montagnes, flowing into the territory of Pierrefonds, Quebec and Senneville, Quebec, in the city of Montreal, in Quebec, in Canada.

The course of the river mainly passes through urban areas with urban park areas.

Annually, the surface of the river is generally frozen from mid-December to late March, however, the period of safe ice circulation is usually from late December to mid-March.

== Geography ==
The hydrographic slopes adjacent to the "rivière à l’Orme" are:

- North side: Lac des Deux Montagnes, Ottawa River;
- East side: Rivière des Prairies, Lake St. Louis;
- South side: Lake St. Louis, St. Lawrence River;
- West side: Lac des Deux Montagnes.

The "rivière à l’Orme" originates in the southwestern part of the Pierrefonds borough of Montréal, on the west side of the Cineplex Kirkland Theater.

From its source, the "rivière à l’Orme" flows over 5.1 kilometres (3.2 mi) according to the following segments:

- 1.5 kilometres (0.93 mi) southwesterly along the north side of autoroute 40 and cutting off the Timberlea Trail up to an urban stream (coming from South of autoroute 40);
- 3.6 kilometres (2.2 mi) northwesterly up to its mouth. Note: the “Anse à l'Orme road” runs along this segment, first on the North-East side and then on the South-West side.

The "rivière à l’Orme" empties on the East shore of “Anse à l'Orme”, which is a natural extension of the Lac des Deux Montagnes. At the end of the course, this river crosses the L'Anse-à-l'Orme Nature Park. This cove is bounded by Pointe Madeleine (North side) and Pointe Boyer (South West side). The mouth of this river is located at:

- 2.6 kilometres (1.6 mi) South of the mouth of the Lac des Deux Montagnes;
- 5.5 kilometres (3.4 mi) North of the Galipeault Bridge on Highway 20, connecting the borough of Sainte-Anne-de-Bellevue, Quebec and the Perrot Island;
- 2.8 kilometres (1.7 mi) south of Île Bizard, a borough of Montréal;
- 5.4 kilometres (3.4 mi) in the South-East, opposite of Pointe-Calumet.

== Toponymy ==
Since at least 1925, some documents attest to the use of the toponym "Rivière à l’Orme", designating this urban stream. This designation (in its present form) evokes the work of life of “Julien Hubert dit de Lorme”. The latter benefited from a concession in 1668, a lot of land adjacent to the Orme cove, located at the western end of the island of Montreal, just South-West of the “Cap à l'Orme”. In the past, many historians mistakenly believed that this toponymic designation was explained by the presence of elms in this area. The toponymic names "Cap à l'Orme », « Anse à l'Orme » and « Rivière à l'Orme" are intertwined.

The toponym "Rivière à l'Orme" was formalized on December 5, 1968, at the Commission de toponymie du Québec, i.e. at the creation of the Commission.

== See also ==
- Ottawa River, a watercourse
- Lac des Deux Montagnes, a body of water
- Rivière-des-Prairies, a watercourse
- L'Anse-à-l'Orme Nature Park, an urban park
- Pierrefonds, Quebec, an agglomeration of Montreal
- Senneville, Quebec, a city on the West Island of Montreal.
- List of rivers of Quebec
