= Peace park (disambiguation) =

Peace park is another name for a transboundary protected area

Peace Park may also refer to:

- ANZAC Peace Park, Australia
- Canberra Peace Park, Australia
- Hiroshima Peace Memorial Park, a park in Hiroshima, Japan dedicated to the legacy of Hiroshima as the first city in the world to be nuclear bombed
- Island of Ireland Peace Park, a park in Messines, Belgium
- Miyazaki Peace Park
- Nagasaki Peace Park
- Oxford Falls Peace Park
- Peace Park (Missouri), in Columbia, Missouri at the University of Missouri
- Peace Park (Montréal) (Place de la Paix), a public place in Montreal, Canada
- Peace Park (Seattle), a park in Seattle, Washington, United States
- Santiphap Park, Bangkok, also known as Peace Park
- Waterton-Glacier International Peace Park

== See also ==
- Peace Garden (disambiguation)
