= Des Rapides Park =

Urban park in Montreal, Canada

- Parc des Rapides
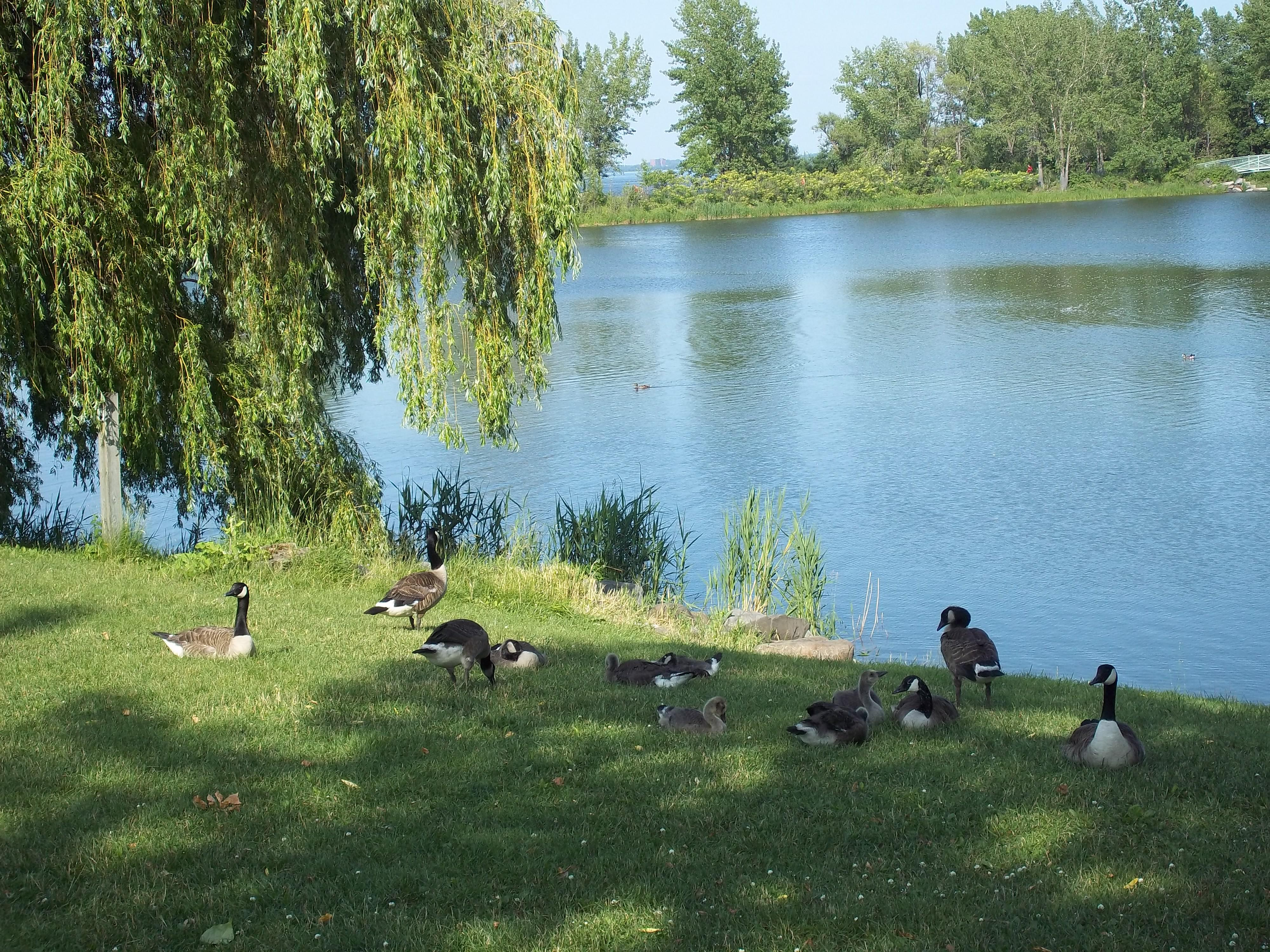
- Canada geese along the shore of the park
- Interactive map of Des Rapides Park
- Type: Urban park
- Location: LaSalle, Montreal, Quebec, Canada
- Coordinates: 45°25′42″N 73°35′28″W
- Area: 30 hectares (74 acres)
- Operator: City of Montreal
- Open: 7:00 a.m. to 9:00 p.m.
- Status: Open all year
- Public transit: De l'Église station with 58; STM Bus: 58
- Website: Parc des Rapides

Des Rapides Park (French: Parc des Rapides) is an urban park in Montreal, Quebec, Canada. It is located adjacent to the Lachine Rapids in the borough of LaSalle. It is considered by the City of Montreal as one of its large parks.

The park is 30 hectares (74 acres) large. It has been a migratory bird sanctuary since 1937, and is home to over 225 species of bird, among these is the great blue heron, a protected species.

== History ==
The site was subject to an archaeological excavation in 1984. The excavation uncovered various artifacts which proved the presence of the First Nations on Heron Island, Goat Island and the Boquet presque isle dating back over 2,000 years. It is believed that the area was used as a staging area for Iroquois fishermen.

The park contains the foundations of the old Lachine hydroelectric generating station, built in 1897 and demolished in 1948 as well as the ruins of a few water mills built between 1712 and 1869.

== Amenities ==
Des Rapides Park contains bicycle paths, hiking trails as well as cross-country skiing trails in winter. The Vague à Guy, or Guy's Wave, created by the Lachine Rapids, is accessible via marked paths to the water. Part of the park stretches out into the water and is accessible only during posted hours.
