= Angrignon Park =

Urban park in Montreal, Canada

- Parc Angrignon
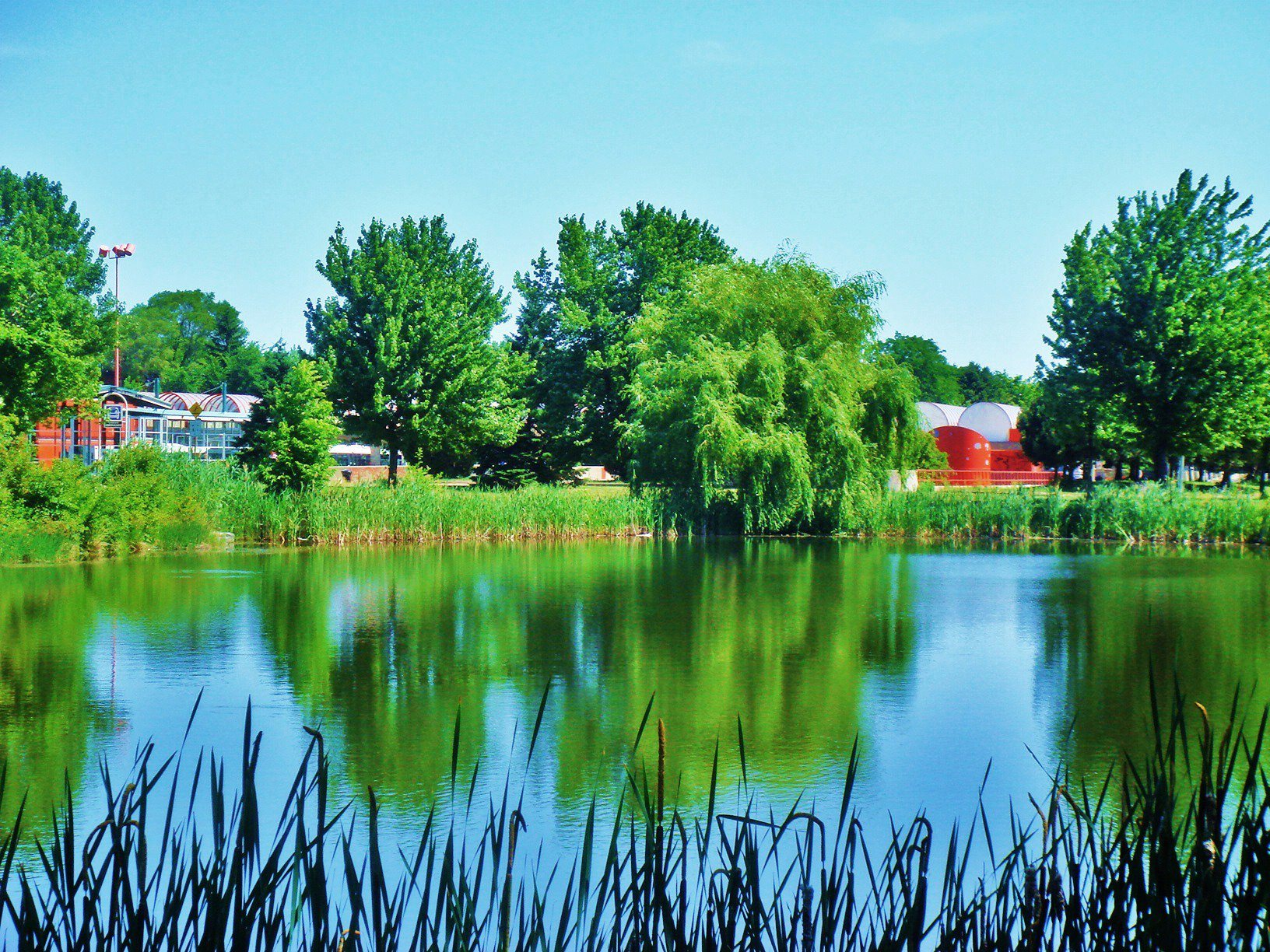
- The lake in the centre of the park
- Interactive map of Angrignon Park
- Type: Urban park
- Location: Southwest, Montreal, Quebec, Canada
- Coordinates: 45°26′41″N 73°36′06″W
- Area: 97 hectares (240 acres)
- Operator: City of Montreal
- Open: 6:00 a.m. to 12:00 a.m.
- Status: Open all year
- Public transit: Angrignon; Terminus Angrignon
- Website: Parc Angrignon

Angrignon Park (French: Parc Angrignon, pronounced [paʁk ɑ̃ɡʁiɲɔ̃]) is an urban park in the Southwest borough of Montreal, Quebec, Canada. Angrignon Park has a total area of 97 hectares. It includes a 1.1km long lake. It is considered by the City of Montreal as one of its large parks.

The park is named for Jean-Baptiste Angrignon (1875–1948), an alderman in Côte Saint-Paul from 1921 to 1934. Before 1927, the area was named Crawford Park.

The park was inspired by the design of 19th-century English gardens. The park contains 20,000 trees, winding paths and a pond surrounded by cattails.

The park is located just south of Ville-Émard, east of Carrefour Angrignon, which is also named after Jean-Baptiste Angrignon, and west of Verdun.

The park was once home to a small farm.

Angrignon station – the western terminus of the Montreal metro Green Line – is at the northern corner of the park.

On December 7, 2020, the City of Montreal announced a plan to create a green corridor between the park and Bois-de-Saraguay Nature Park. The plans included a walking path, a bicycle link, and landscaping.
