= Jean-Baptiste Angrignon =

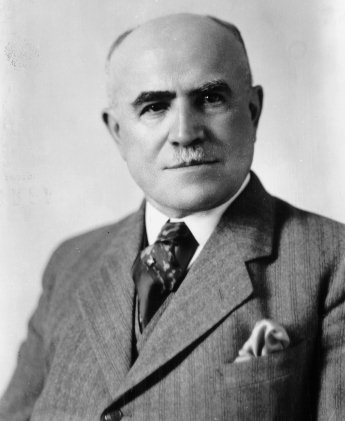
Jean-Baptiste Angrignon

Jean-Baptiste-Arthur Angrignon (French pronunciation: [ʒɑ̃ batist ɑ̃ɡʁiɲɔ̃]; March 2, 1875 – 1948) was a Canadian politician and a city councillor in Montreal, Quebec.

== Background ==
The son of Delphis Angrignon and Flavie Dufresne, he was born on March 2, 1875, in St-Placide, Quebec, grew up in the Deux-Montagnes, Basses-Laurentides area and was a merchant. In 1902, he married Marie-Elisabeth Skelly. He came to Montreal in 1915.

== City Councillor ==
In 1921, he was elected to the City Council of Montreal for the district of Saint-Paul. He was re-elected in 1924, 1926, 1928, 1930 and 1932. From 1930 to 1932, Angrignon was a Member of Montreal Executive Committee from 1928 to 1930. He oversaw the development of Angrignon Park on land that belonged to the Crawford family.

He did not run for re-election in 1934.

== Retirement ==
Angrignon died in Montreal in 1948.

== Honors ==
The following Montreal landmarks were named to honor Jean-Baptiste Angrignon:

- Angrignon Park (named after him in 1927);
- Angrignon Metro station (completed in 1978);
- Carrefour Angrignon shopping mall (built in 1986).
- Boulevard Angrignon (named in 1993)

== Footnotes ==
Political offices
Preceded by The electoral district was established in 1921.	City Councillor, District of Paul; 1921-1934	Succeeded by Jules-Arthur Pharand
