= Sun Yat-sen Park (Montreal) =

Park in Chinatown of Montreal, Canada

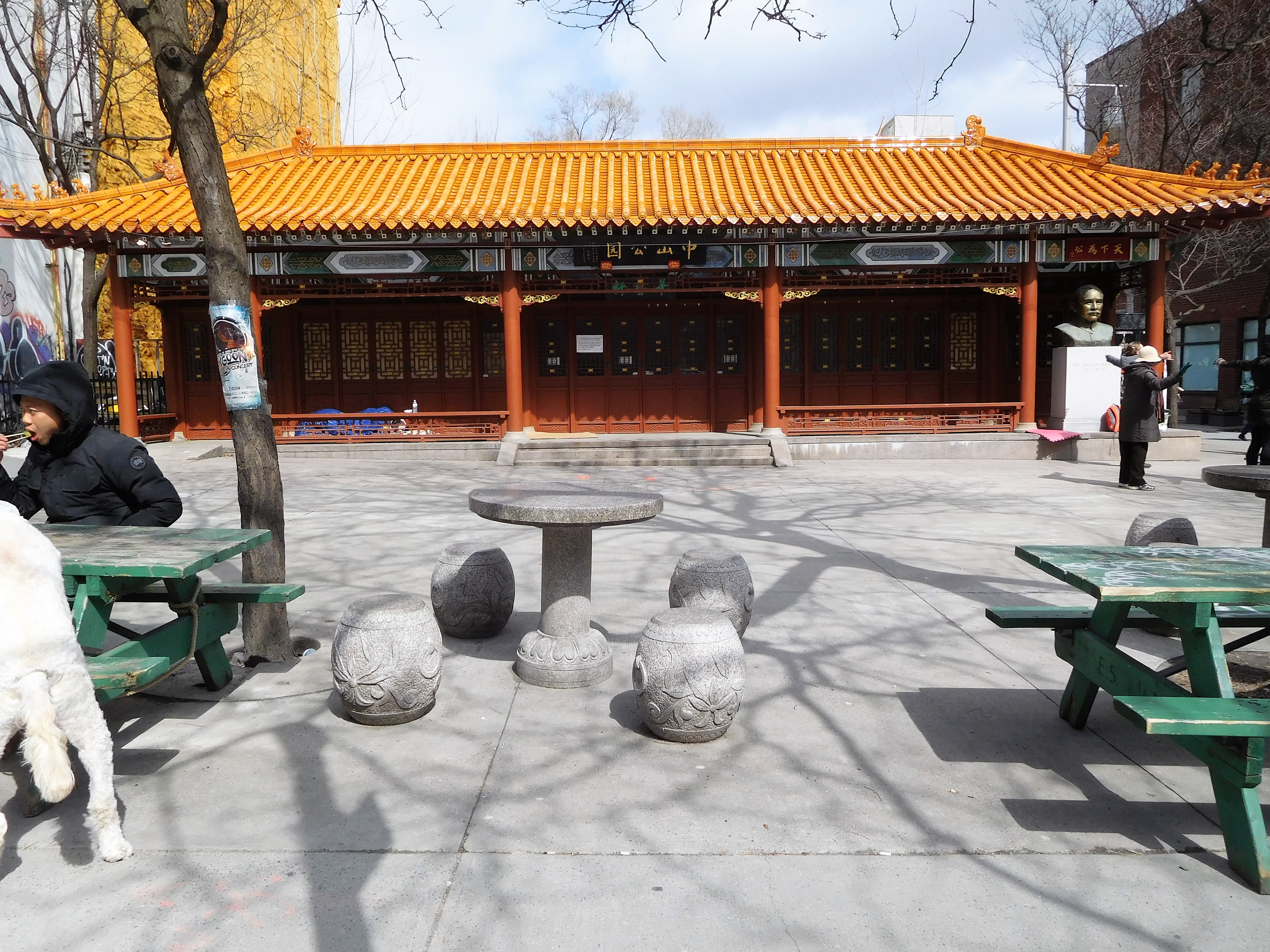
- Part of the park, including the bust of Sun Yat-sen, in 2018
- Interactive map of Sun Yat-sen Park
- Location: Montreal, Quebec, Canada
- Coordinates: 45.50788°N 73.56039°W

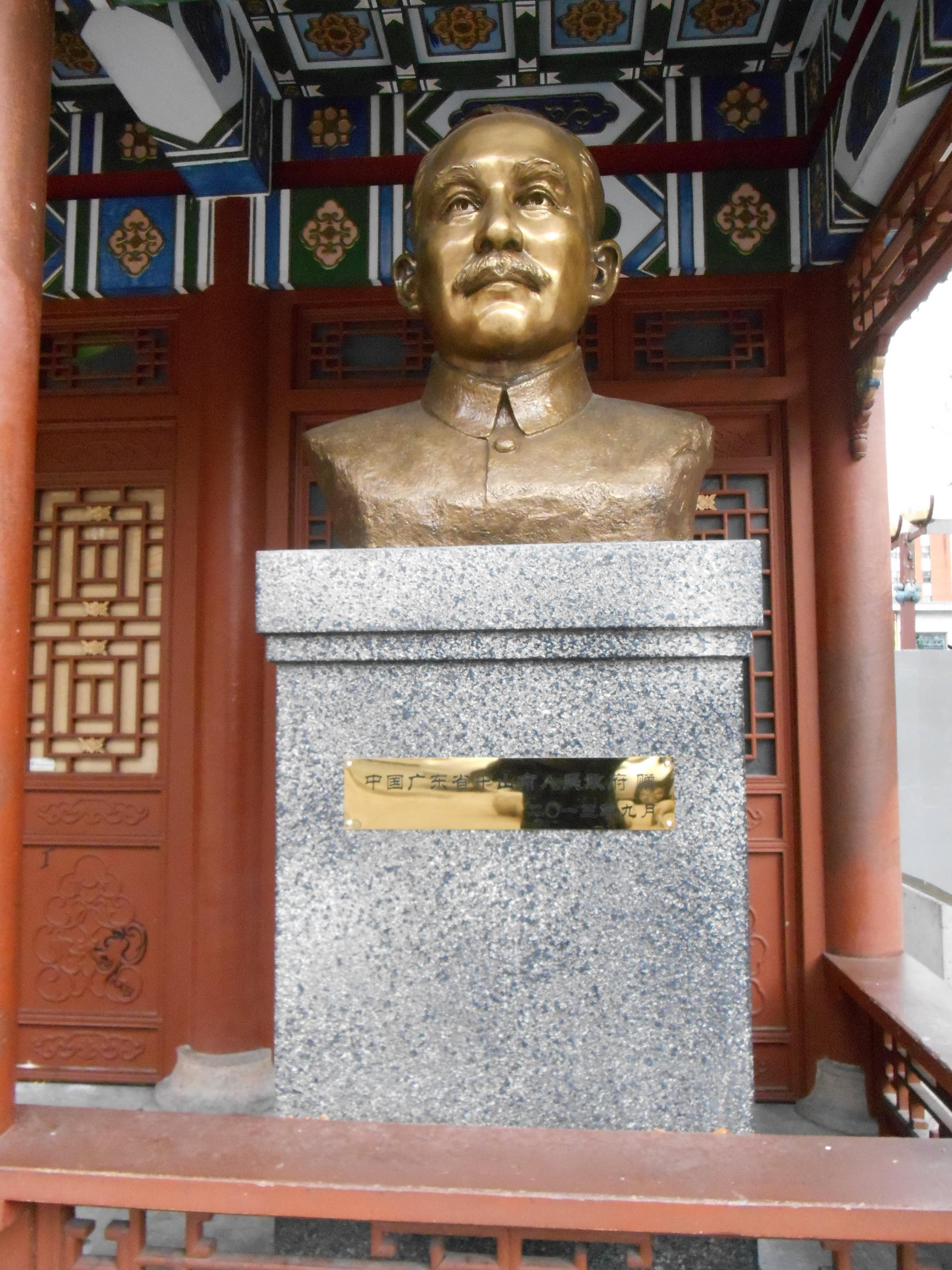
Bust of Sun Yat-sen, 2013

Sun Yat-sen, or Place Sun Yat-sen, is a park in Montreal's Chinatown, in Quebec, Canada. The space, named after Sun Yat-sen, hosts many cultural events and other festivals. It features a bust of Sun Yat-sen.

== See also ==
- List of parks in Montreal
