= Peace Garden =

Peace Garden may refer to:

- International Peace Garden on the Canada/US border
- International Peace Gardens in Salt Lake City
- International Peace Garden Airport in North Dakota
- Peace Garden at Nathan Phillips Square in Toronto
- St Thomas' Peace Garden in Birmingham, England

== See also ==
- Peace park (disambiguation)
