= Bois-de-Saraguay Nature Park =

Large nature park in Montreal, Canada

- Parc-nature du Bois-de-Saraguay
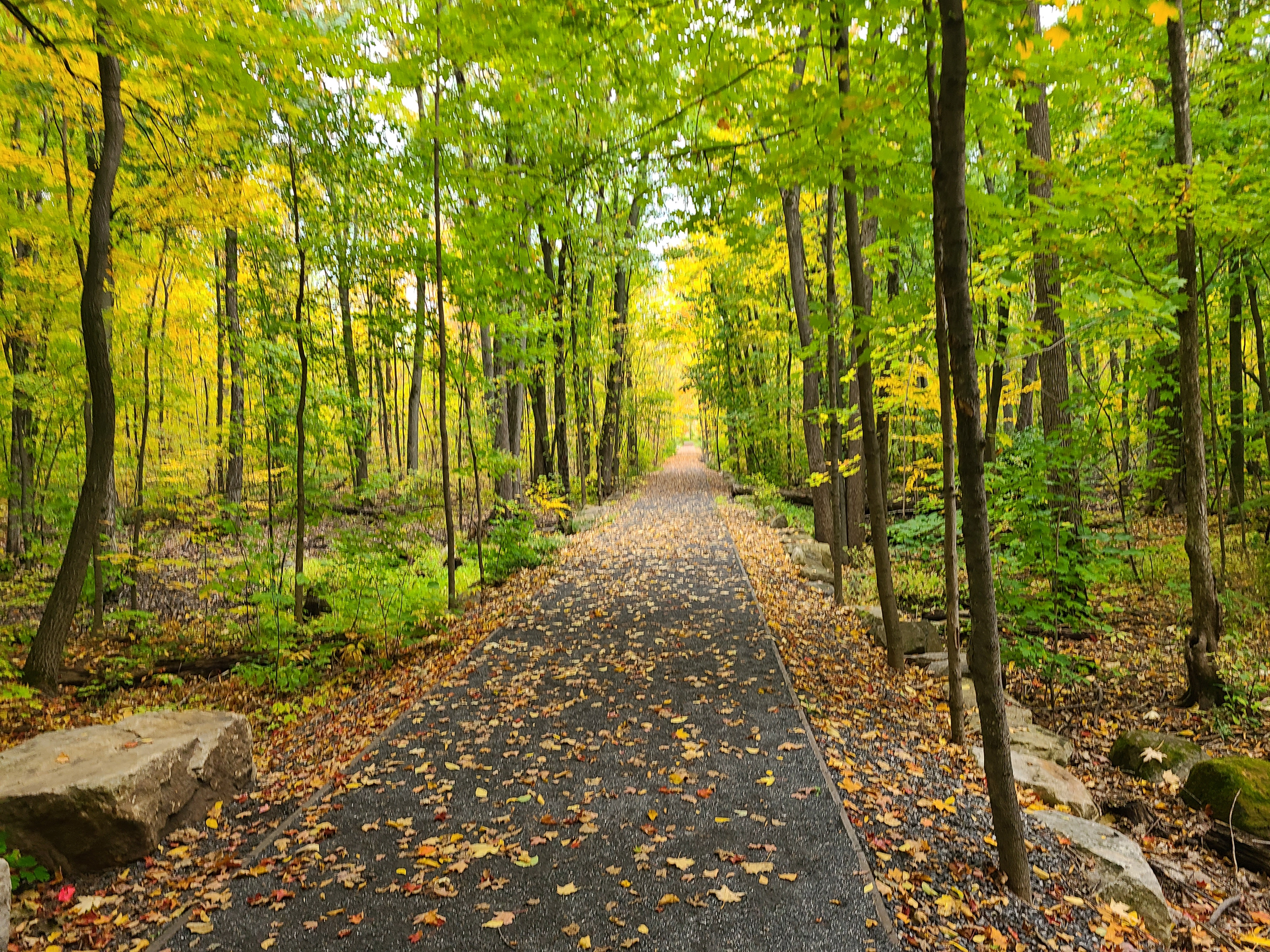
- A path in the park

- Location within Montreal
- Type: Nature park
- Location: Ahuntsic-Cartierville, Montreal, Quebec, Canada
- Coordinates: 45°30′53″N 73°44′36″W
- Area: 97 hectares (240 acres)
- Created: 2016
- Operator: City of Montreal
- Open: sunrise to sunset
- Status: Open all year
- Public transit: STM Bus: 68, 382, 468
- Website: Official website

The Bois-de-Saraguay Nature Park (French: Parc-nature du Bois-de-Saraguay) is a large nature park in the Ahuntsic-Cartierville borough of Montreal, Quebec, Canada.

It has an area of about 97 hectares. It has about 1.8 kilometres (1.1 mi) of hiking trails.

The park area had been closed since its acquisition by the City in the early 1980s and almost gave way to a real estate project in the late 1970s. The park was inaugurated as Bois-de-Saraguay Nature Park on 2 June 2016.

The park is one of four parts of the Bois-de Saraguay heritage site. It is mainly made up of deciduous trees. Maple groves, ash groves, poplar groves, and oak groves constitute the forest. There are several large, century-old trees. In addition, the forest includes plants designated as vulnerable, vulnerable to harvesting, or likely to be designated as threatened or vulnerable.

On 7 December 2020, the City of Montreal announced a plan to create a green corridor between the park and Angrignon Park. It is to have a walking path, a bicycle link, and landscaping.

== Mary Dorothy Molson House ==
Mary Dorothy Molson House
- Maison Mary-Dorothy-Molson (French)
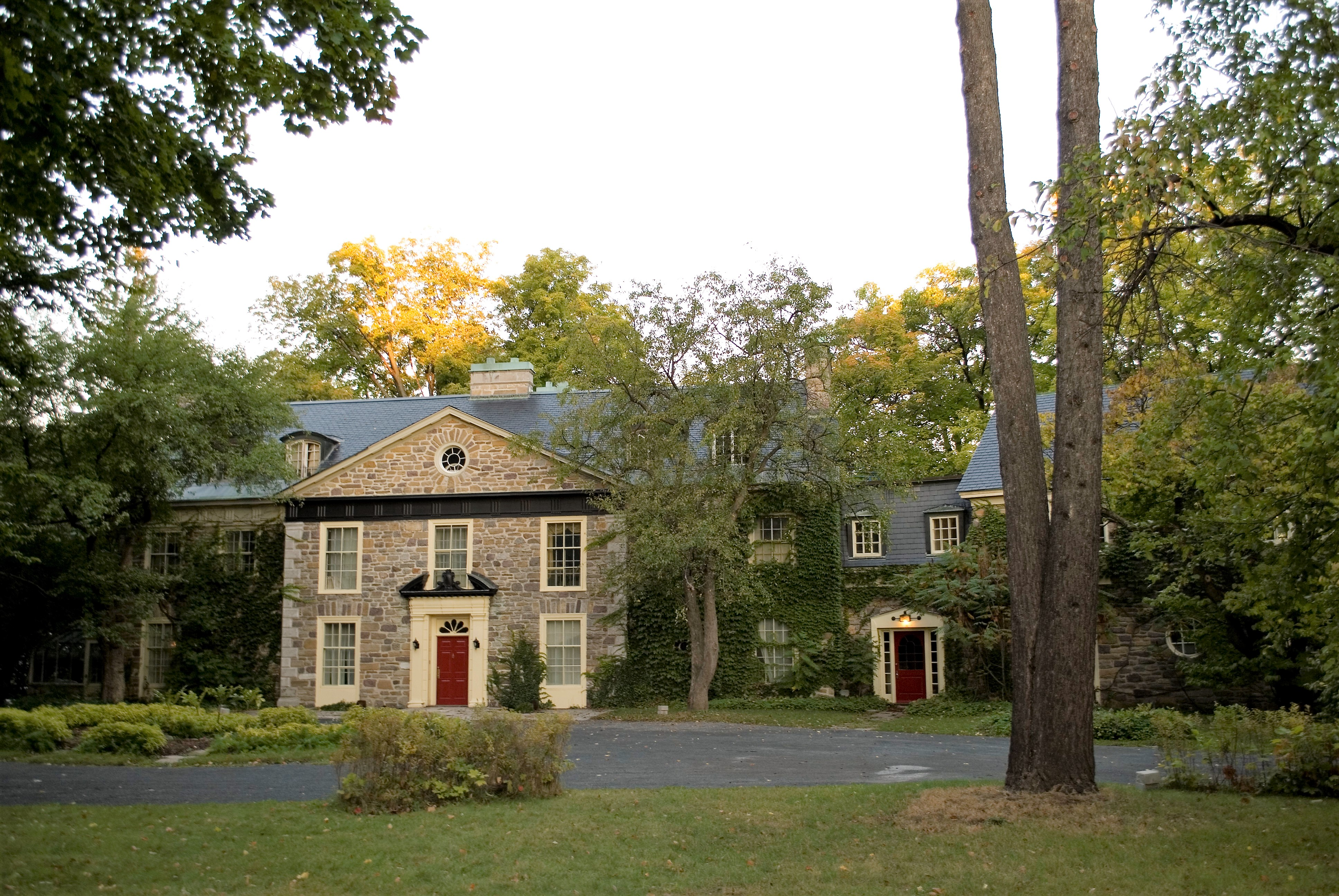
- Mary Dorothy Molson House
- Interactive map of Mary Dorothy Molson House
- 45°31′7″N 73°44′39″W
- Type: Heritage building
- Location: 9095 Gouin Boulevard West Ahuntsic-Cartierville, Montreal, Quebec, Canada

History
- Built: 1930-1931

Site notes
- Architect: Alexander Tiloch Galt Dumford
- Architectural style: Neo-Georgian inspiration
- Owner: City of Montreal

Patrimoine culturel du Québec
- Official name: Maison Mary-Dorothy-Molson
- Type: Heritage house
- Designated: 23 February 2009
- Reference no.: Lot 4 269 032

The Mary Dorothy Molson House is a heritage building that is part of the park. Its architectural composition was inspired by the Neo-Georgian style.

In 1930-1931, Mary Dorothy Molson, daughter of Herbert Molson and wife of Hartland Campbell MacDougall, had the residence built on land belonging to her husband's mother. It was designed by architect Alexander Tilloch Galt Durnford. The land legally became the property of Mary Dorothy Molson in 1931. In 1936, the residence was extended according to the plans of the same architect.

In 1974, Mary Dorothy Molson sold the house to a developer. The property was acquired in 1981 by the Montreal Urban Community as part of the creation of the park. This became the property of the City of Montreal following municipal mergers in 2002.
