= Rapides du Cheval Blanc =

Rapids in Laval, Quebec, Canada

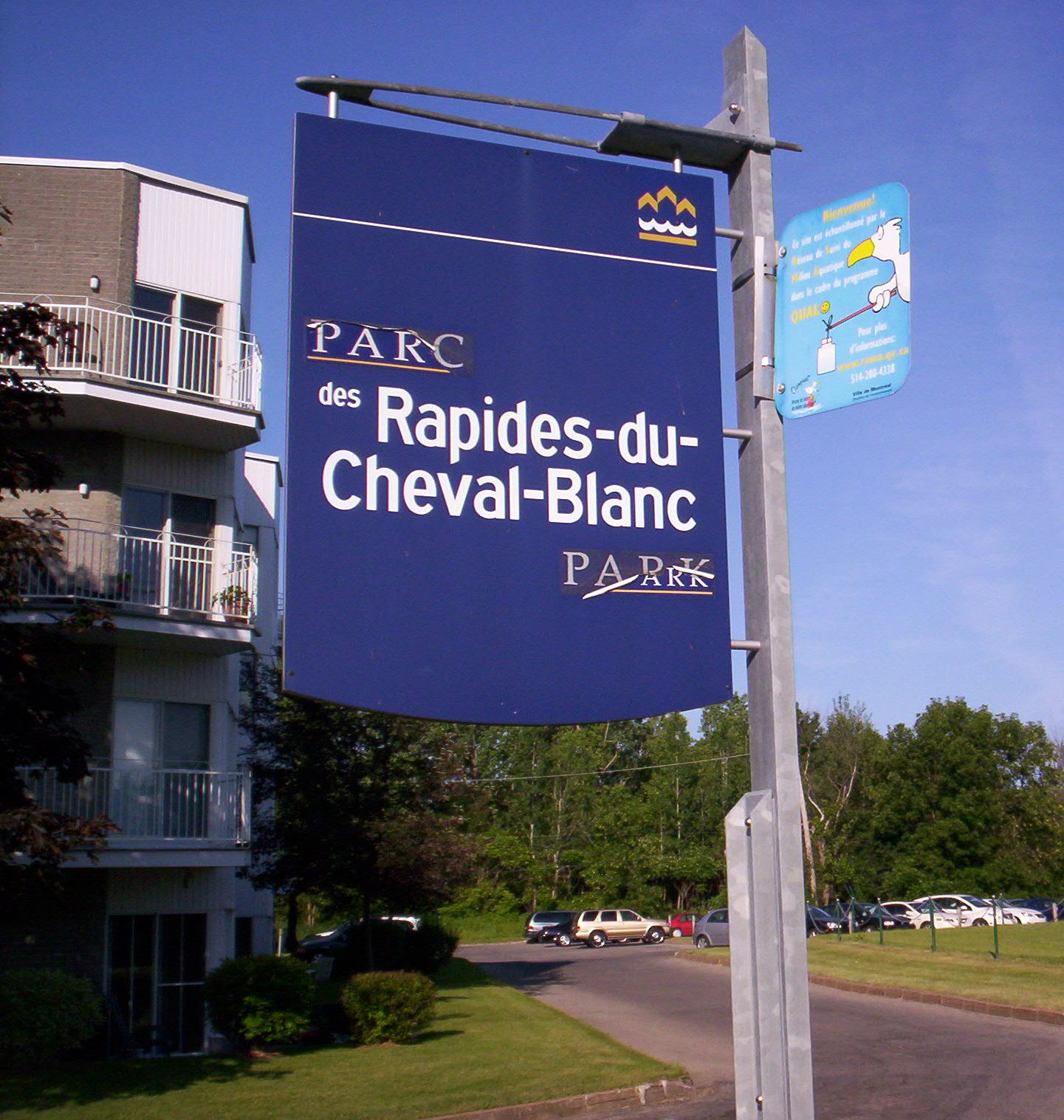
- Rapides du Cheval Blanc Park

- Location within Montreal
- Location: Pierrefonds-Roxboro, Montreal, Quebec, Canada
- Coordinates: 45°30′58″N 73°49′56″W
- Operator: City of Montreal

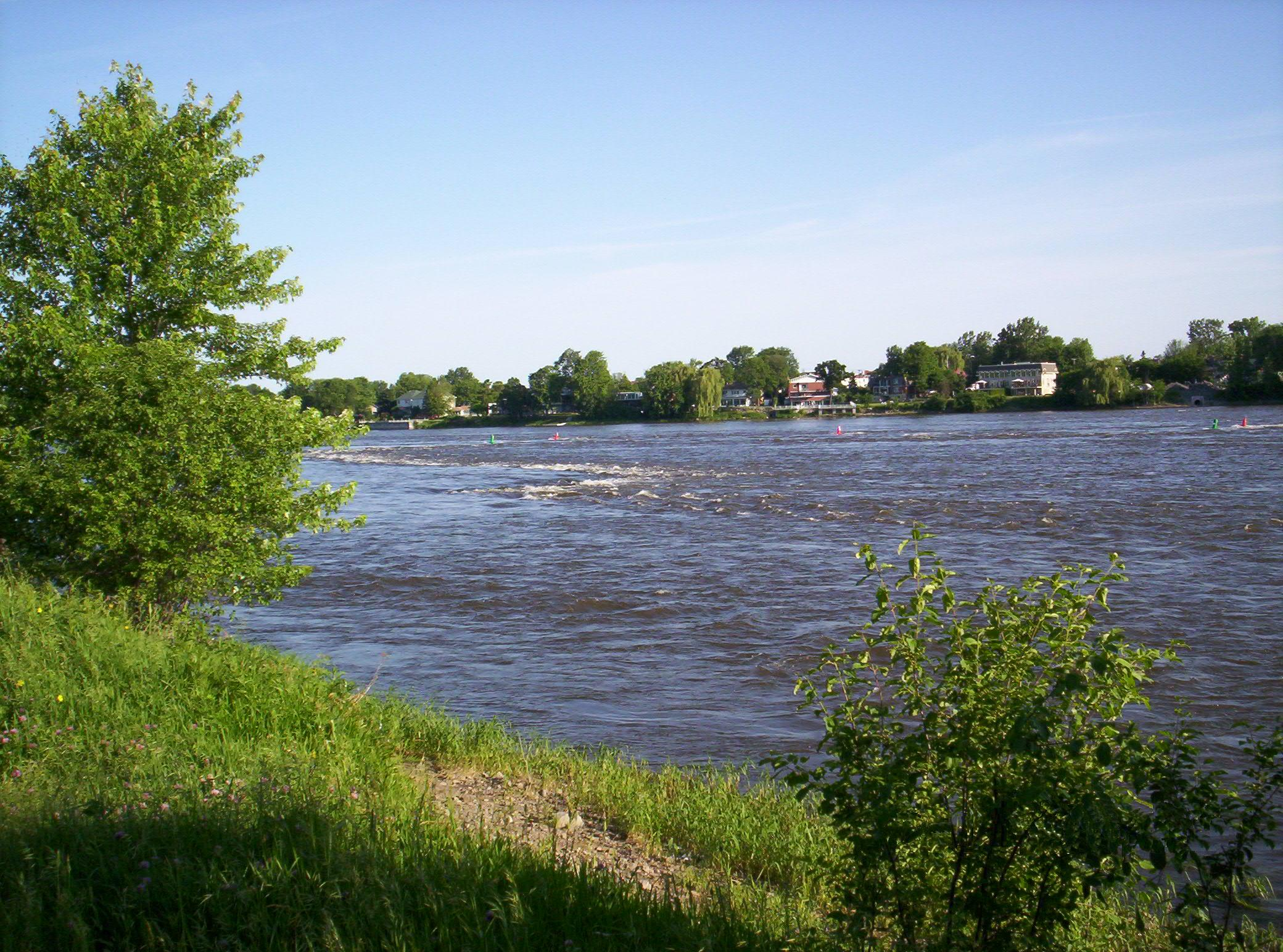
Summertime photo of the rapids.

The Rapides du Cheval Blanc, or White Horse Rapids, flow between the Island of Montreal, Pierrefonds-Roxboro and Sainte-Dorothée, Laval on the Rivière des Prairies in Quebec. (Note: There are three locations in Quebec, Canada with the name "Rapides du Cheval Blanc". This article is about the rapids between the north shore of the Island of Montreal and the south shore of Sainte-Dorothée, Laval.) The Rapides du Cheval Blanc also include a protected wooded area, a public city park adjacent to the rapids, and to a fault line underneath the area.

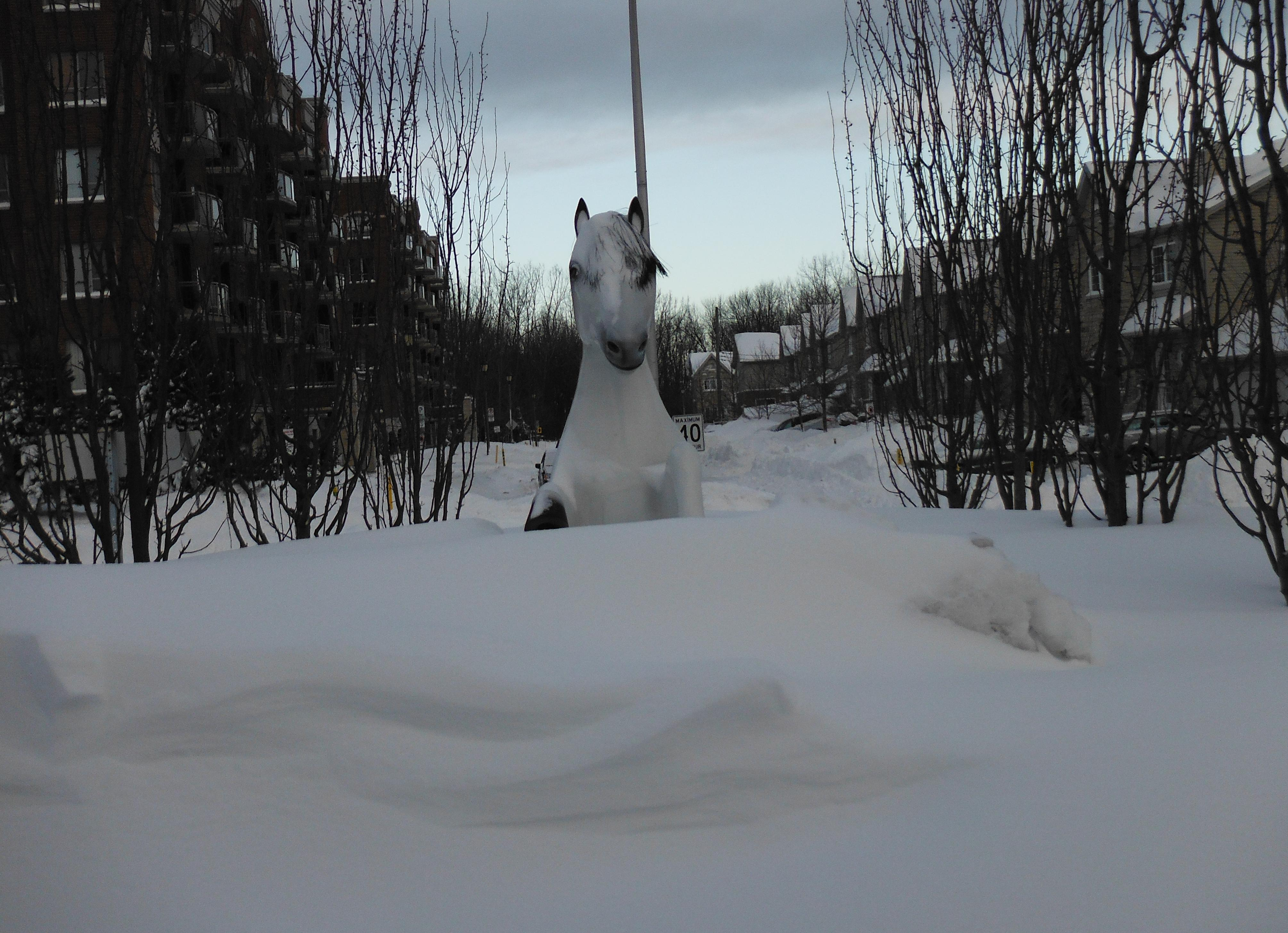
At the roundabout situated at the northern terminus of Source Boulevard, a prominent feature is the statue depicting a white horse.

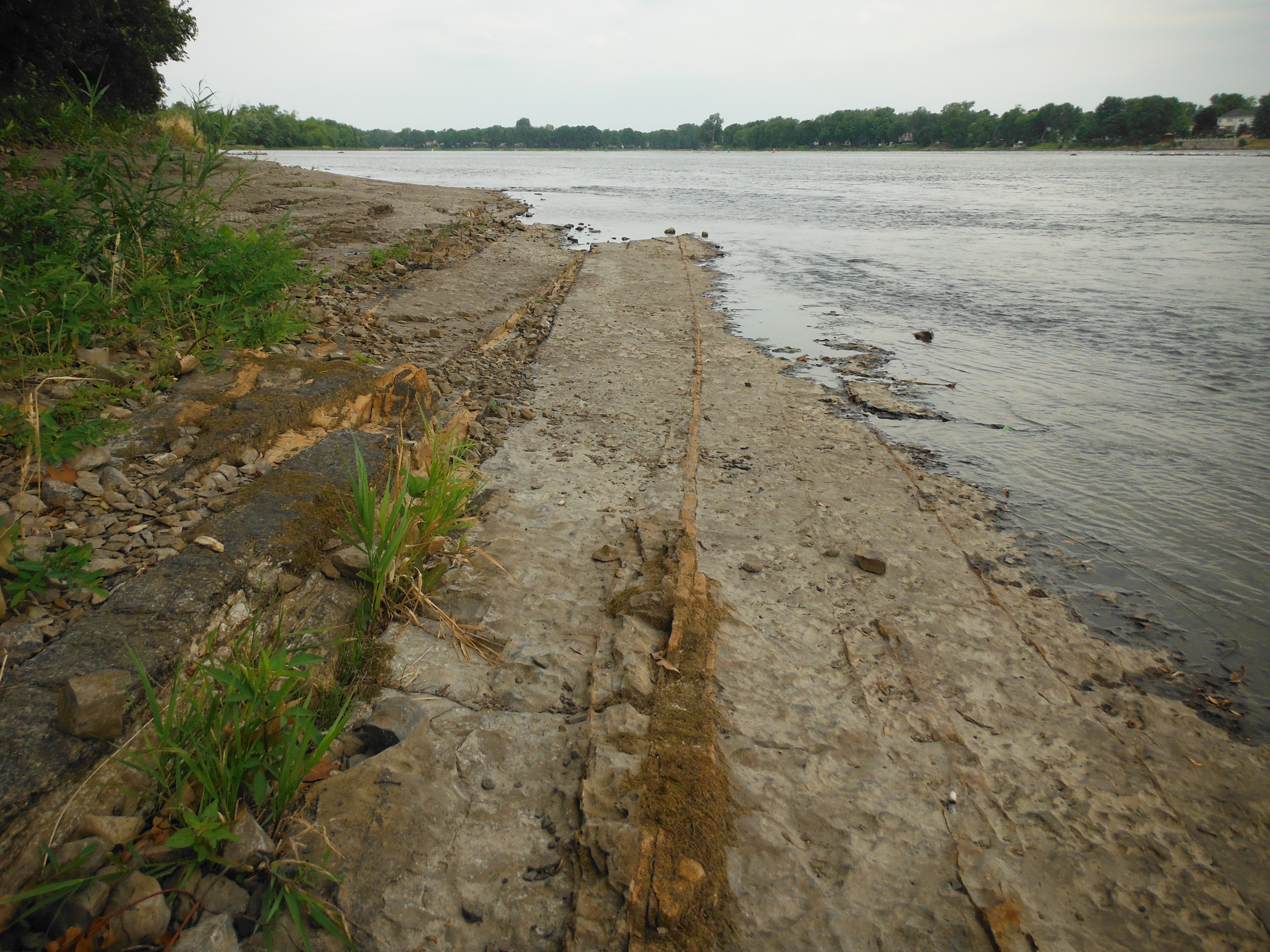
Along the shoreline, various formations of rocks are observable, exhibiting distinct geological characteristics.

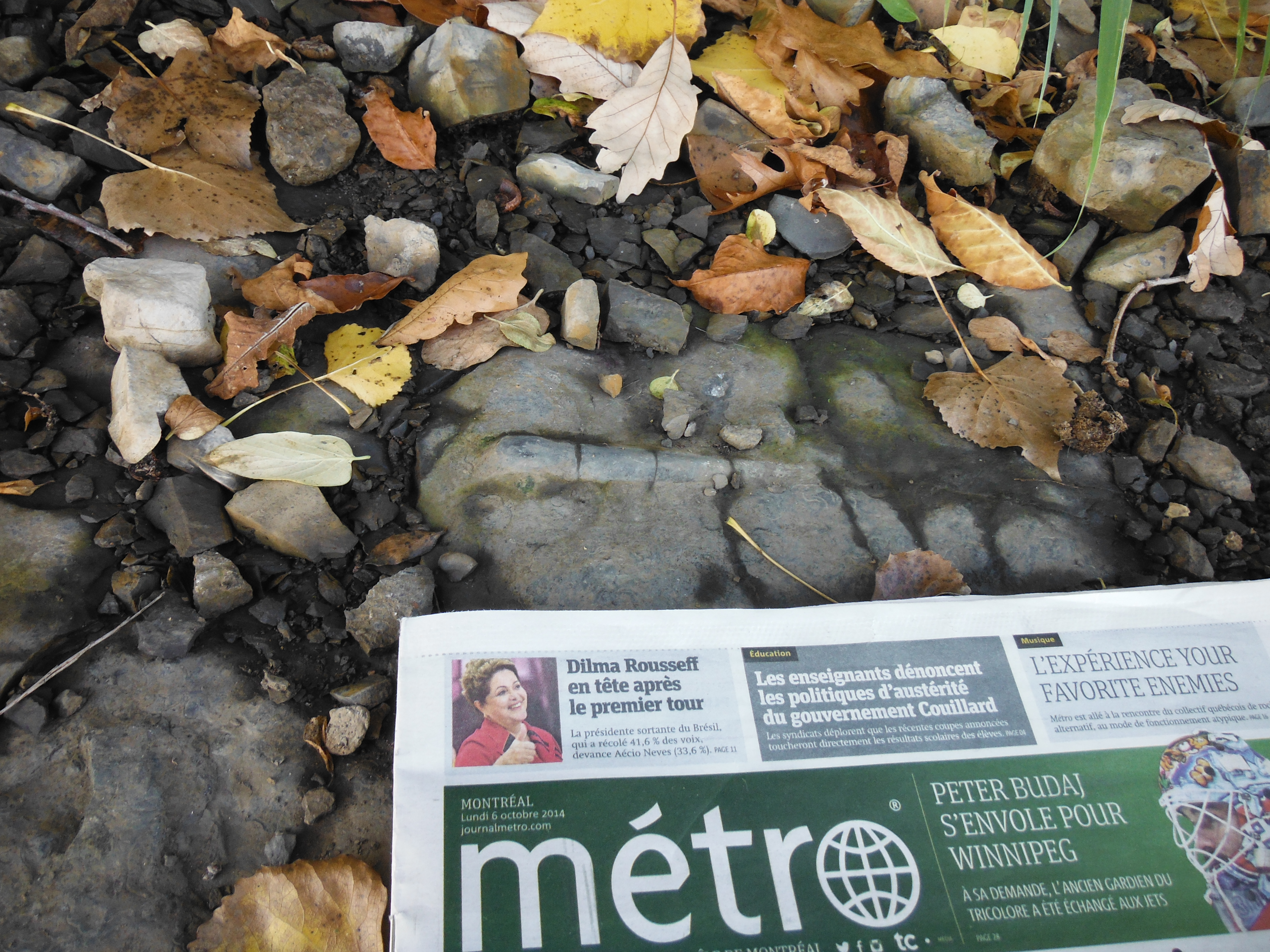
Notably, embedded within these rock formations are fossils, providing valuable insight into the area's geological history. The newspaper depicted in the photograph serves as a scale reference, aiding in the visualization of the size of the observed features.

== History ==
The name Whitehorse or Cheval Blanc can be traced to several legends. A legend dating to the 18th century tells of a white horse that would emerge from the Rivière des Prairies to terrorize villagers and ravage crops. Another legend speaks of a horse pulling a cart on a ferry across the river to Île Bizard. When the cable connecting the ferry to the shore broke and started to drift downstream, the horse escaped at the rapids. Another legend tells of a white horse that carried the materials for constructing of the Church of Sault-au-Récollet. The horse jumped aboard a boat in the middle of the rapids.

The land next to the Rivière des Prairies is subject to spring flooding and has flooded many times in the past.

=== Ownership of the River ===
Both Federal and Provincial governments own the river. The Federal government and Fisheries and Oceans Canada police the water. The Provincial police the land, the bottom of the river and the north and south shorelines. Floating buoys are placed in the river during the summer to aid boat navigation.

The river cleanliness is usually good according to the RSMA (Réseau de suivi du milieu aquatique) water testing that is done weekly during warm weather. Rapides du Cheval Blanc is numbered RDP-180. The river temperature can be found on the RSMA (Réseau de suivi du milieu aquatique) water quality report, it peaks at 25 °C (77 °F) in the months of July and August.

=== Ownership of the Land ===
The original owners of the land were the Algonquin people.

19th century historical maps show boundary lines of the farmers fields using the Seigneurial system with names associated to the land. From East to West the names on the Henry Whitmer Hopkins map dating from 1879 are:

- Lot 49 Jos Legault
- Lot 51 M. Lelande (Lalande)
- Lot 52 P. Legault
- Lot 55 N. Lelande (Lalande) Where the public park overlooks the rapids is today. The north end of the street "Riviera".
- Lot 62 Jos. Legault
- Lot 67 Berthiaume
- Lot 68 Jos. Brunet
- Lot 75 M. Langerin
- Lot 76 Jos. Langerin
- Lot 77 N. Cardinal
- Lot 86 Cardinal
- Lot 87 Richermois
- Lot 92 Jos. Theoret

Aerial photographs of 1947 show that the Cheval Blanc land was agricultural at that time. When the Deux-Montagnes (original name Canadian Northern Railway) railway was built through the land during the years 1912–18, many fields were cut off from their original parcel of farmland, resulting in triangle shaped properties.

Presently on the undeveloped lots or properties, the Habitant-farmers boundary lines still exist and are visible as 3 feet wide by 3 feet tall stone walls. Many of the farmers' apple trees can still be found in the woods.

Residential development began to replace the farmland in 1953.

The location in the river was officially named in 1968 by the Gouvernement du Québec and Natural Resources Canada.

== Rapides du Cheval Blanc Park ==
The land was being considered as a "Promenade" park as early as 1974.

According to the Gouvernement du Québec and Natural Resources Canada, a public park was created in 1997 on the site of a former sewage treatment plant. The sewage plant was on Lot 67 and Lot 62.

The current nature park, a further expansion of the 1997 park, was finally created in 2009.

On August 8, 2019, the City of Montreal announced a plan to include the Rapides du Cheval Blanc Park into the future Grand Parc de l'Ouest.

There is no official parking lot, there is only normal city street parking for visitors. The exception to this is at the eastern edge of the park where a water pumping station is located. At this location there are four parking spots.

There are no toilets and there is no running tap water.

There are numerous poison ivy plants that may affect children and pets. Warning posts about the ivy have been placed on the grounds.

There can be mosquitoes and other irritating insects in the official park. In summer mosquito season, DEET repellent might be used, to be able to walk the foot trail through the woods in comfort.

After sunset, in the months of June and July, fireflies can be seen in the eastern woods on the fenced bicycle path that is west of 5th Avenue North street.

== Deaths ==
In recent times there have been two deaths at the rapids. On September 16, 2016, the death of Jean Langevin who was 59 years old, and on July 9, 2017, the death of Anoshan Nageswara who was 20 years old.

== Wildlife ==
Wild animals that can be found on the land near the rapids are rabbits, squirrels, snakes, chipmunks, turtles, cardinals, seagulls, sandpipers, herons, ducks, geese, chickadees and finches.

== Development ==
The railway (built in 1916) acted as a barrier to traffic, prevented the easy commercial development of the land. The land was also a designated flood-zone, it often floods in the spring. The river (Rivière des Prairies) water was badly polluted in the past and this also discouraged land development .

On June 26, 1968, the road, Sources Boulevard was voted to be extended north, past the train tracks. This allowed safe access to the land that was previously blocked by the train tracks. Development could then take place on the land adjacent to the rapids.

In 1972 a multimillion-dollar apartment building was built.

In December 2015 the sum of $3,431,280 was paid by Réal Ménard the Montreal Executive Committee member responsible for green spaces, to the owner of Lot 1 171 908 on behalf of the city of Montreal. The land located at 1 171 908 was originally designated unbuildable floodplain valued at $1.00, then rezoned, then valued at $452,600 in 2014-2016 .

The Quebec Environment Department de-zoned the Pierrefonds land as unbuildable flood plain. West of the official park, the streets "Rue du Sureau", "Rue du Celtis", "Rue de L Achillee", and "Rue de L Armoise" were created and constructed in 2009 for a new development.

East of Rue Riveria (the official park) is a northern extension of the road "Boulevard des Sources" and "Rue Debours" on which buildings were constructed in 2004. The former mayor of Pierrefonds-Roxboro, Mme Monique Worth in October 2004 bought a property at 5200 Sources Blvd. in the newly developed Cheval Blanc land for $180,538 and sold it April 4, 2005, for $235,000 for a profit of $54,000.

The city of Montreal has given the Cheval Blanc rapids the designation of RDP 180 and tests the water quality during the summer (RSMA Le Réseau de suivi du milieu aquatique).

== See also ==
- List of parks in Montreal
