= Pointe-aux-Prairies Nature Park =

Large nature park in Montreal, Canada

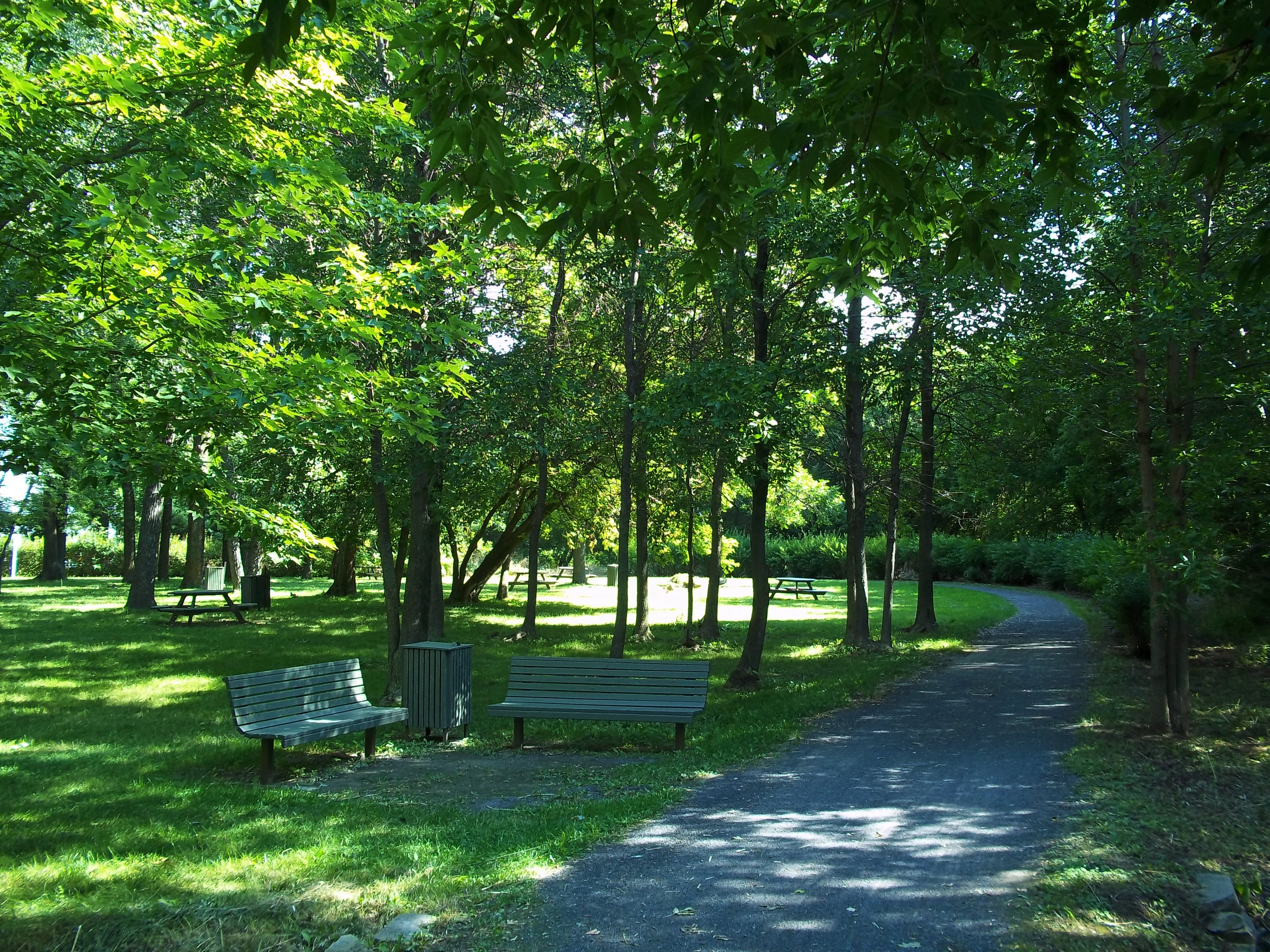
- A path in the park.

- Location within Montreal
- Type: Nature park
- Location: Rivière-des-Prairies–Pointe-aux-Trembles, Montreal, Quebec, Canada
- Coordinates: 45°41′00″N 73°30′50″W
- Area: 261 hectares (640 acres)
- Operator: City of Montreal
- Visitors: 100,000 per year
- Open: sunrise to sunset
- Status: Open all year
- Public transit: STM Bus: Sherbrooke Street East: 86, 186; Gouin Boulevard East: 183; Notre Dame Street East: 189, 362
- Website: Official website

Pointe-aux-Prairies Nature Park is a large nature park in the Rivière-des-Prairies–Pointe-aux-Trembles borough of Montreal, Quebec, Canada.

The park is divided into three sections. The northern part is between Gouin Boulevard East and Autoroute 40. The central section is between Autoroute 40 and Sherbrooke Street East. The southern section is between Sherbrooke Street East and the Saint Lawrence River.

Covering an area of 261 hectares (640 acres), the park features marshes, fields and forests.

== History ==
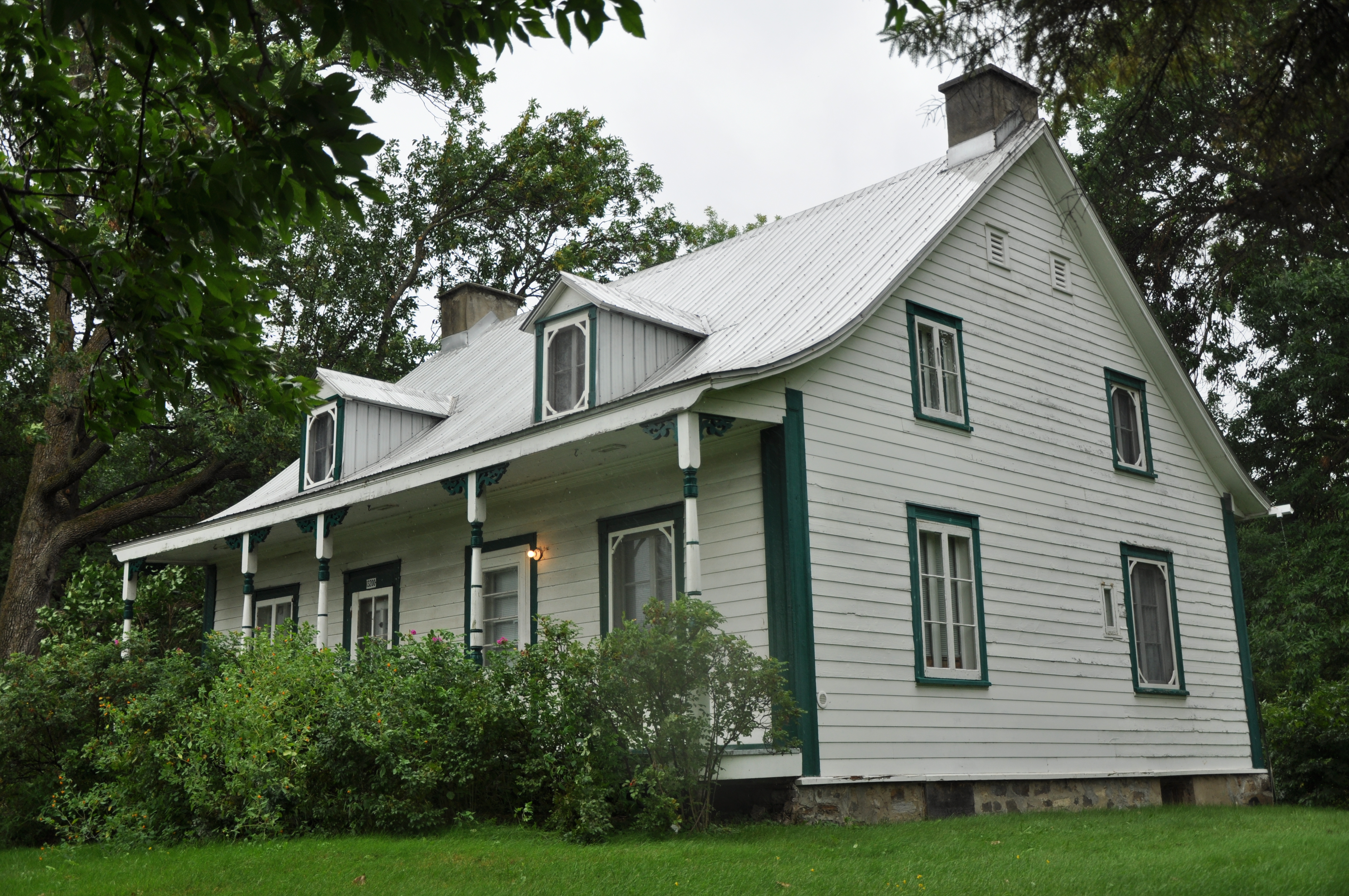
Maison Bleau in September 2011.

In the 1980s, the regional parks of Rivière-des-Prairies, Pointe-aux-Trembles and Bois-de-la-Réparation were combined into a single nature park. Following a competition held in Rivière-des-Prairies and Pointe-aux-Trembles primary schools, the Montreal Urban Community endorsed the name of Pointe-aux-Prairies for the park. This name was suggested by a young student who wished to associate the name of the two districts where the park is located. It was officially named in 1987.

=== Maison Bleau ===
Integrated to the park, the Maison Bleau, located at 13200 Gouin Boulevard East, is a rare example of a type of country house known as a "Quebec-style house" (French: maison québécoise). Rectangular in shape, a floor and a half tall, it features a pointed upturned gable, of which the front covers the veranda's full width. Built between 1851 and 1861, facing the Rivière des Prairies on exploited agricultural land, its rural environment has been preserved from urbanization. It is protected as a cultural asset on the Répertoire du patrimoine culturel du Québec by Quebec law.
