= Lachine Rapids =

Rapids in the Saint Lawrence river at Lachine, Quebec, Canada

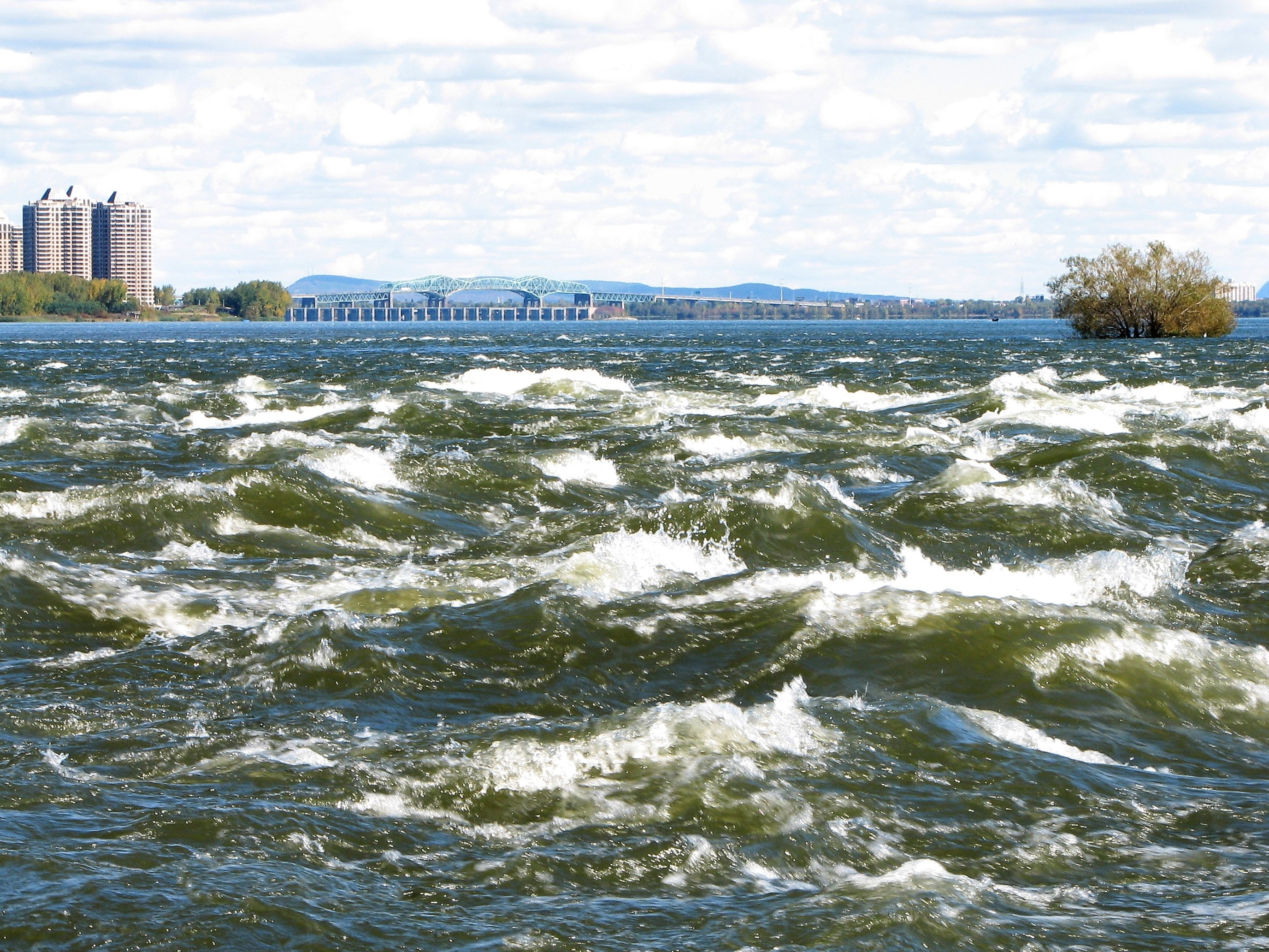
The Lachine Rapids

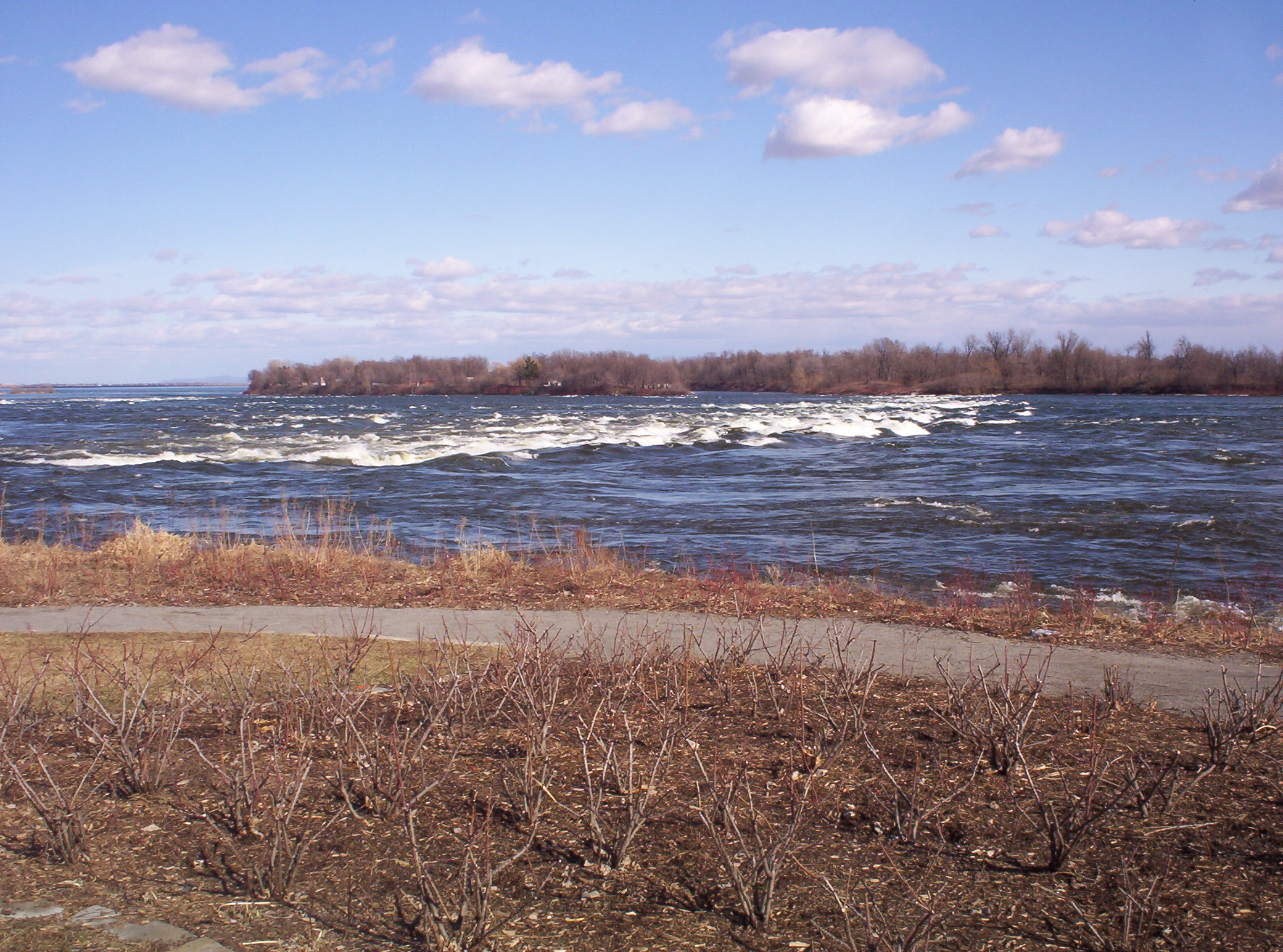
The Lachine Rapids

The Lachine Rapids (French: Rapides de Lachine) are a series of rapids on the Saint Lawrence River, between the Island of Montreal and the South Shore. They are confusingly located near the borough of Lasalle and not Lachine. The Lachine Rapids contain large standing waves because the water volume and current do not change with respect to the permanent features in the riverbed, namely its shelf-like drops. Seasonal variation in the water flow does not change the position of the waves, although it does change their size and shape. The rapids are about 4.8 kilometres (3.0 mi) in length. In the past these represented a considerable barrier to maritime traffic. Until the construction of the Lachine Canal through Montreal, the rapids had to be portaged. Even with the canal, the difficulty was such that it was usually more convenient to ship goods by rail to Montreal, where they could be loaded at the city's port. Montreal remains a major rail hub and one of Canada's largest ports for that reason.

The Lachine Rapids are now passed by the South Shore Canal (Saint-Lambert and Côte Sainte-Catherine locks) of the Saint Lawrence Seaway.

== Wildlife ==
The rapids contain a number of islands used by migratory birds.

== History ==
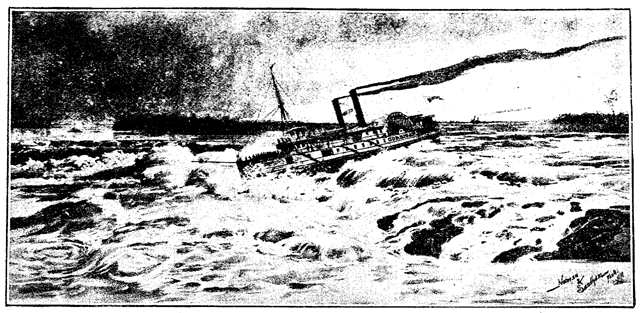
Boat crossing the rapids, ca. 1890

The first European to see the rapids was Jacques Cartier, who sailed up the St. Lawrence River in 1535, believing he had found the Northwest Passage. In 1611, Samuel de Champlain named the rapids Sault Saint-Louis, after a teenaged crewman named Louis who drowned here; the name later extended to Lac Saint-Louis. This name remained in use until the mid-19th century, but later came to be replaced by the name of the adjacent town of Lachine. The name "Lachine" itself is derived from the French name for China - La Chine.

The first Europeans known to have traveled above these rapids were Champlain and Étienne Brûlé on 13 June 1611. Brûlé continued upriver to live among the Algonquin, while Champlain himself would not travel further up the Ottawa River until May 1613. Louis Jolliet's July 1674 canoe accident in the rapids destroyed his official report on the existence of the Mississippi River, and raised the standing of his fellow explorer Jacques Marquette.

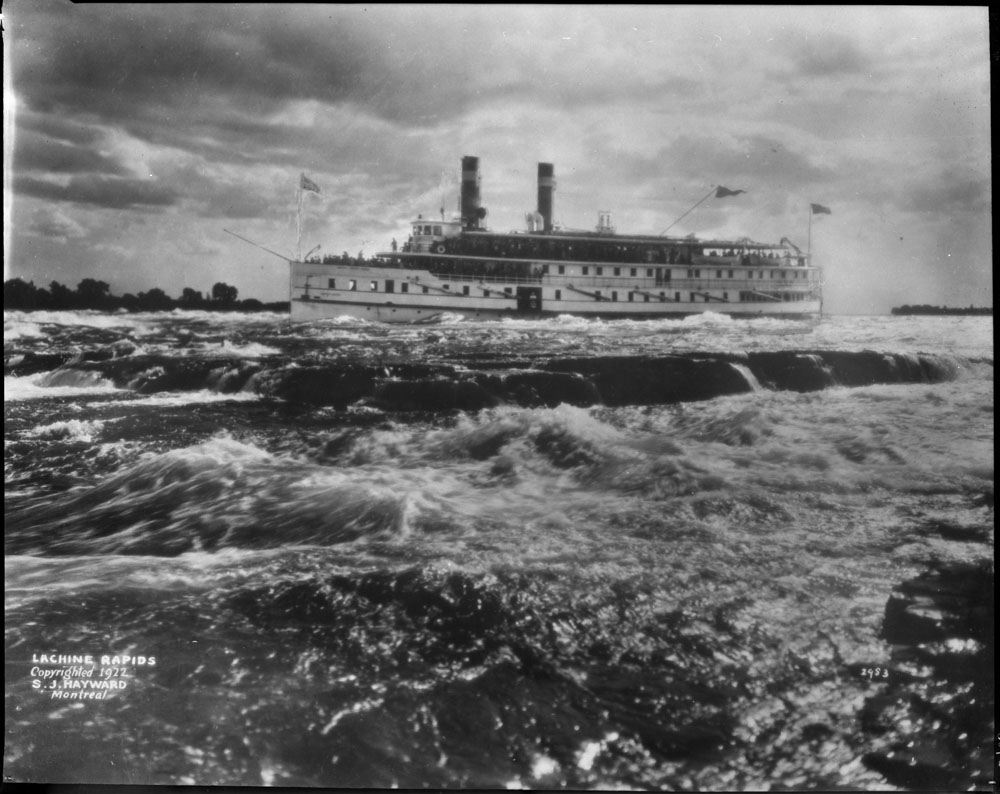
A boat navigating the rapids in 1922

The first person to design a ship capable of shooting the Lachine Rapids was shipbuilder and carpenter John McQuaid, a native of County Armagh, Ireland who later settled in Kingston, Ontario with his family.

== Recreation ==
Whitewater rafting and jet boat expeditions to the rapids are available in Montreal. Whitewater kayaking has become popular, along with river surfing, on a standing wave adjacent to the Habitat 67.(45°30′00″N 73°32′31″W).

The city maintains Des Rapids Park which doubles as bird sanctuary and a place for visitors to appreciate the rapids.

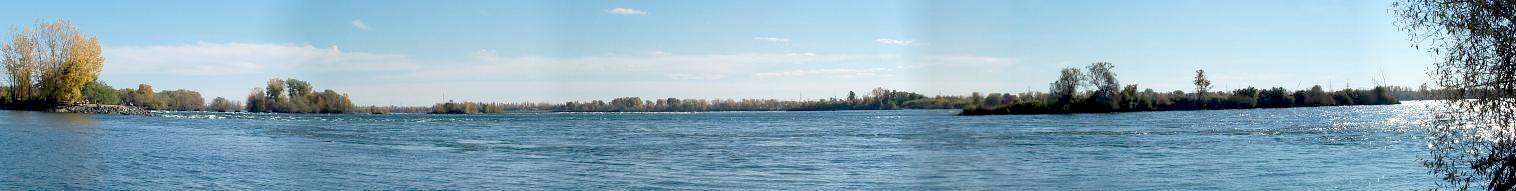
The Lachine rapids, seen from the borough of LaSalle
