= Ruisseau-De Montigny Nature Park =

Large nature park in Montreal, Canada

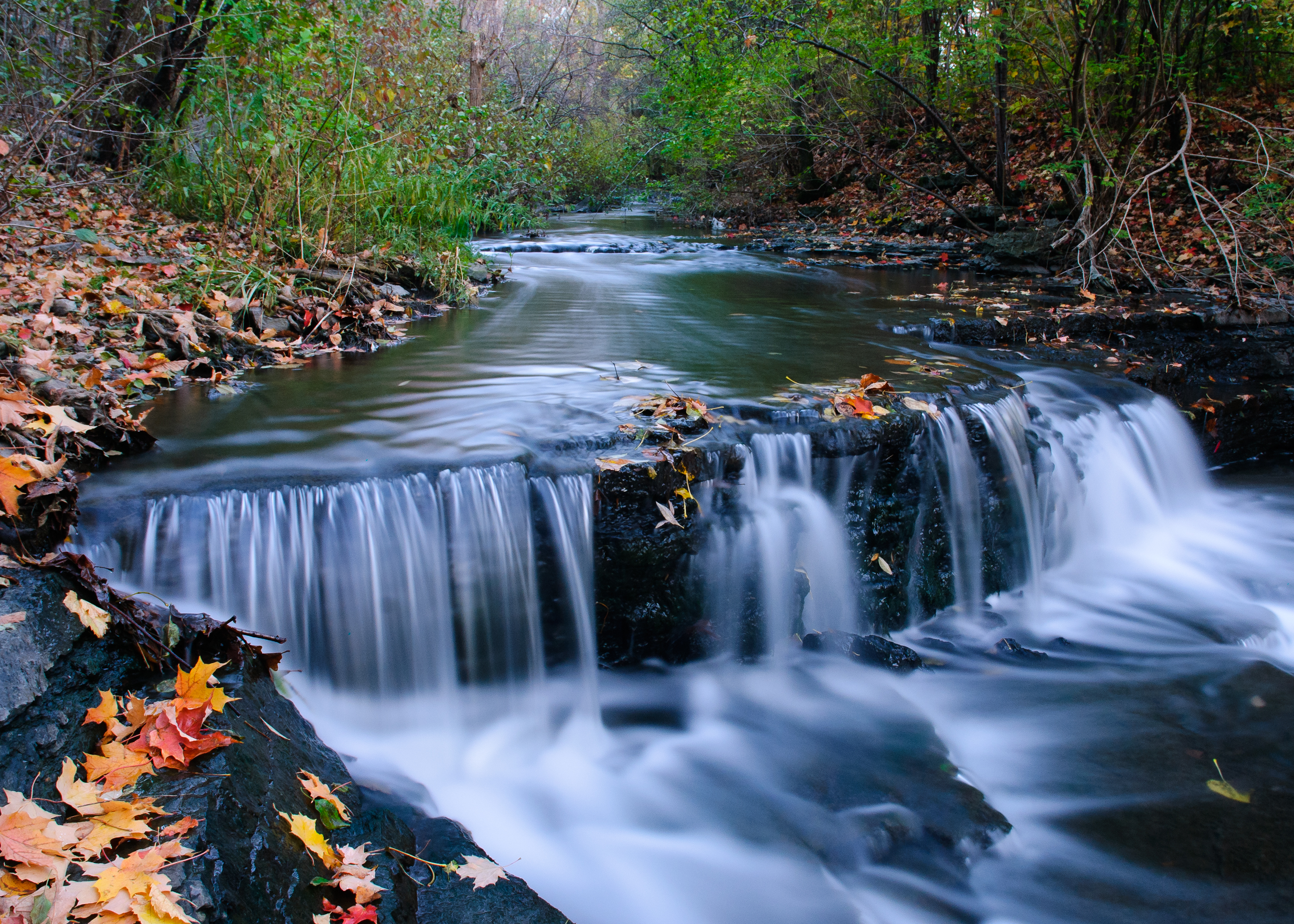
- A waterfall in the park

- Location within Montreal
- Type: Nature park
- Location: Rivière-des-Prairies–Pointe-aux-Trembles, Montreal, Quebec, Canada
- Coordinates: 45°37′20″N 73°36′26″W
- Area: 30 hectares (74 acres)
- Created: 2005
- Operator: City of Montreal
- Open: sunrise to sunset
- Public transit: STM Bus: 40, 43, 48, 49, 353, 380, 432
- Website: Official website

Ruisseau-De Montigny Nature Park is a large nature park in the Rivière-des-Prairies neighbourhood of the Rivière-des-Prairies–Pointe-aux-Trembles borough of Montreal, Quebec, Canada.

It is located on the banks of the Rivière des Prairies. Most of the park is located in the western sector of the borough Rivière-des-Prairies–Pointe-aux-Trembles (Rivière-des-Prairies neighbourhood), with a small portion located in the eastern sector of the borough of Anjou.

Ruisseau-De Montigny Nature Park is a linear park, and is located between Perras Boulevard and Henri-Bourassa Boulevard, west of Louis-Hippolyte-Lafontaine Boulevard. The park borrows its name from a stream flowing through it from south to north, emptying into the Rivière des Prairies. This stream, which flows directly over limestone rock, has a waterfall with a drop of 3 metres (9.8 ft).

It includes 3.3 kilometres (2.1 mi) of trails, and four small islands.

A count of the wildlife in the park indicated the presence of 62 species of birds and a dozen different species of mammals.

== History ==
Before its opening of the park, a major cleanup was required to clean the stream and the surrounding woodland, which were previously used to deposit waste for several years. Ruisseau-De Montigny Nature Park opened in 2005 and originally had an area of 22 hectares (54 acres), which by 2011 grew to an area of 30 hectares (74 acres).

In January 2011, the city of Montreal adopted a plan for the development of green space also known as the "De Montigny Stream Basin Eco-territory", in order to improve access to the public. The city also aims to better protect the park, particularly against negative impacts that may occur as a result of the opening of the nearby Olivier-Charbonneau Bridge.
