= Grand Parc de l'Ouest =

Planned large park in Montreal, Canada

Grand Parc de l'Ouest is a planned park along the north shore of the western part of Montreal, Quebec, Canada.

The plan is to combine the following into one large park:

- L'Anse-à-l'Orme Nature Park
- Bois-de-l'Île-Bizard Nature Park
- Bois-de-la-Roche Agricultural Park
- Cap-Saint-Jacques Nature Park
- Rapides du Cheval Blanc Park
- Various areas of interest located in boroughs or related municipalities

The combined area will be over 700 hectares (1,700 acres). It has the potential to become Canada's largest municipal park.

Among its aims are to protect natural environments and to preserve biodiversity

== History ==
On August 8, 2019, the City of Montreal announced the planned creation of the park in order to protect the natural spaces of Montreal's West Island.

In 2021, a 240-page report of the Grand Parc de l'Ouest public consultation was made available.
