= Bois-de-l'Île-Bizard Nature Park =

Large nature park in Montreal, Canada

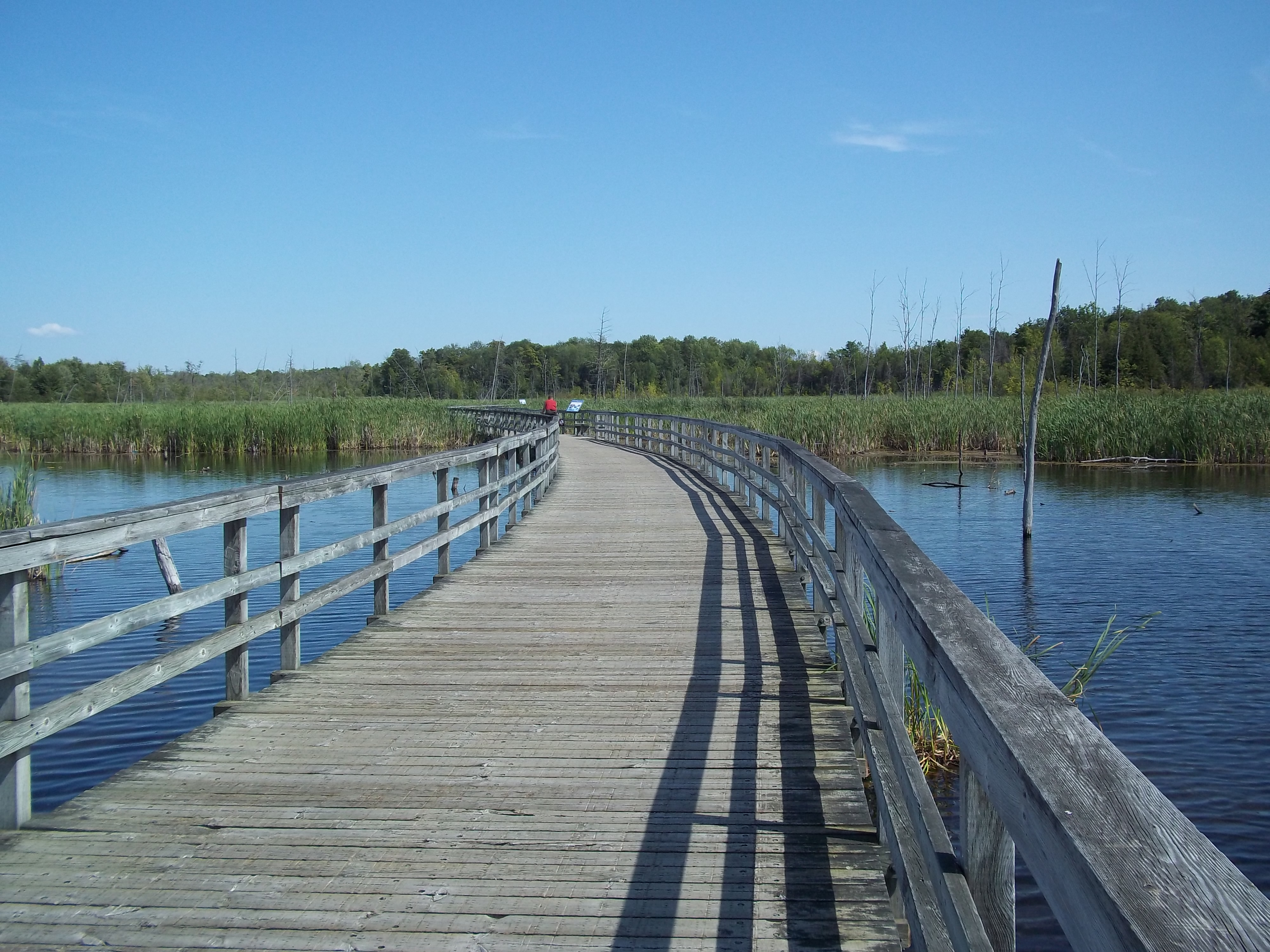
- The large footbridge in the park

- Location within Montreal
- Interactive map of Bois-de-l'Île-Bizard Nature Park
- Type: Nature park
- Location: L'Île-Bizard–Sainte-Geneviève, Montreal, Quebec, Canada
- Coordinates: 45°30′38″N 73°52′55″W
- Area: 216 hectares (530 acres)
- Operator: City of Montreal
- Open: 7:00 a.m. to sunset
- Status: Open all year
- Website: Official website

Bois-de-l'Île-Bizard Nature Park is a large nature park in the L'Île-Bizard–Sainte-Geneviève borough of Montreal, Quebec, Canada.

The nature park is in the east-central part of Île Bizard. Almost all of the area is located in the interior of the island, linking the Lake of Two Mountains and the Rivière des Prairies. Pointe-aux-Carrières is the largest of the three coastal locations. It is the location of the park's welcome centre.

== History ==
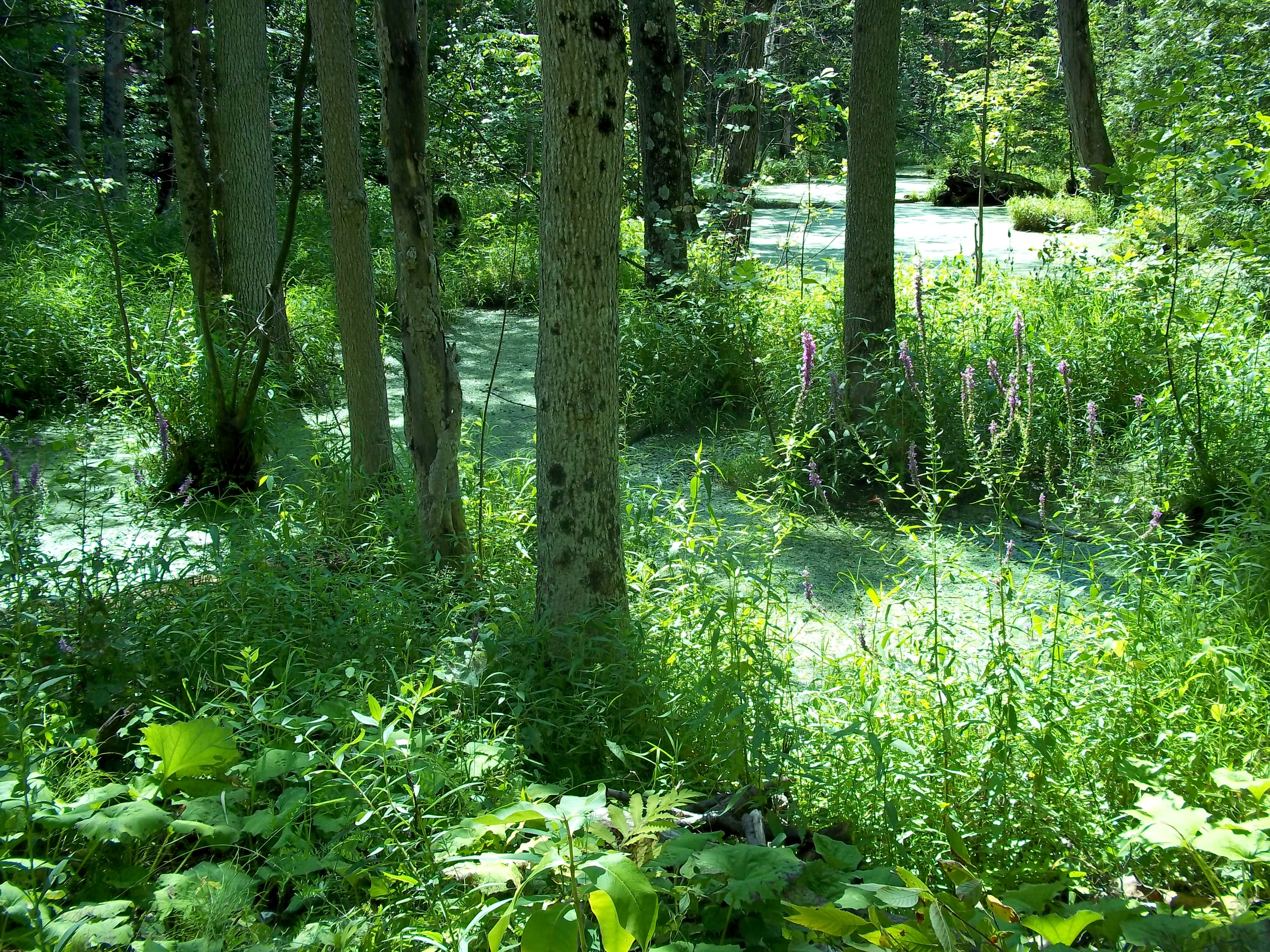
Marshland in the park

In 1678, Jacques Bizard received the right to Île Bizard which at the time was named after Bonaventure. The seigneury of Bizard remained the property of this family until the British Conquest. It was then held by Montreal merchant Pierre Foretier and his heirs. Île Bizard began to be populated in the second half of the eighteenth century.

The area of the Bois-de-l'Île-Bizard Nature Park was probably not been subject to residential development because of its marshy soil and the presence of quarries nearby.

The Bois-de-l'Île-Bizard Nature Park is an area of historical interest. The site was used for a harbour, quarries and beaches. The park is visible to navigators on the Lake of Two Mountains, and served as a stopover for many boats. The bay of Pointe-aux-Carrières offered a place where wooden cages could be detached prior to descending the Lalement rapids at the entrance of the Rivière des Prairies.

In the first half of the nineteenth century this site was also a place of extraction and shipping of stone. The name Pointe-aux-Carrières refers not only to the quarry on this site but also to the quarries on the other side of the main road in the interior of the park. Stones from the quarries were used in the construction of houses on the island.

In the 1930s, the owner of the area, the Roussin-Cardinal family landscape the Pointe-aux-Carrières into a beach picnic ground. The beach was abandoned in the 1960s, probably because of the pollution of the Lake of Two Mountains. The beach has since been reopened.

Today the park is home to a diverse range of ecosystems.

== Future ==
As of 2020, the City of Montreal has a plan to include the park into the future Grand Parc de l'Ouest.
