= Heron Island (Quebec) =

Island in the St Lawrence River, near Montreal, Canada

Ile aux Hérons
- Location within Southern Quebec

Geography
- Location: Saint Lawrence River
- Coordinates: 45°25′23″N 73°34′45″W
- Archipelago: Hochelaga Archipelago
- Area: 0.49 km^{2} (0.19 sq mi)

Administration
- Canada
- Province: Quebec
- City: Sainte-Catherine

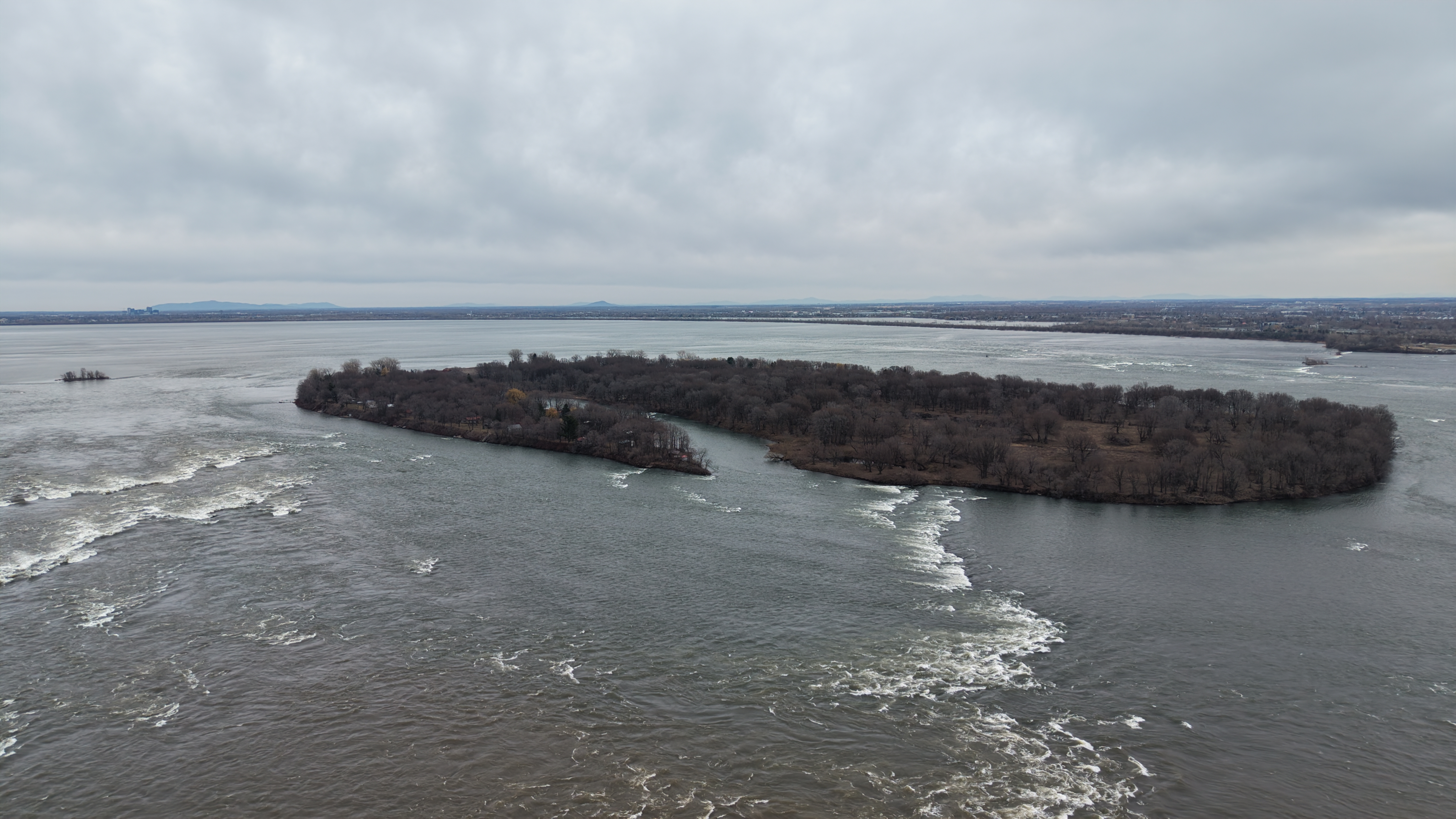
A view of Heron Island (right)

Heron Island is a small island of approximately 129 acres in the Saint Lawrence River and part of Montreal, Quebec, Canada. The northern tip of the island is located in the Lachine rapids. It is one of "Saint-Laurent, Vision 2000" 37 protected sites. In 2002, Hydro Quebec donated the land to The Nature Conservancy of Canada (NCC) which manages the site as a wildlife reserve.

== Federal migratory bird sanctuary ==
In 1937, the island along with nearby Goat, The Seven Sisters, Devil's, and Boquet Islands were collectively granted status as a federal migratory bird sanctuary under its official name of Ile aux Hérons Migratory Bird Sanctuary. Hence its namesake, the island currently (2010) hosts Quebec's 2nd largest colony of Great Blue Herons. Other nesting birds include the Black-crowned Night Heron, Great Egret and numerous others.

Around 2000 it was thought that 3 White-tailed Deer arrived on the island either by swimming or by crossing over ice in the winter. Due to the lack of natural predators an aerial survey in 2012 estimated their population at approximately 46. Much of the vegetation was showing stress and in 2014 permission was granted for a controlled hunt of 10-12 individuals by arrows only.

28 private seasonal cottages are present, mainly concentrated on the eastern tip away from nesting sites. No services, roads, or ferries are available.
