= L'Anse-à-l'Orme Nature Park =

Large nature park in Montreal, Canada

- Parc Nature L’Anse-à-l’Orme
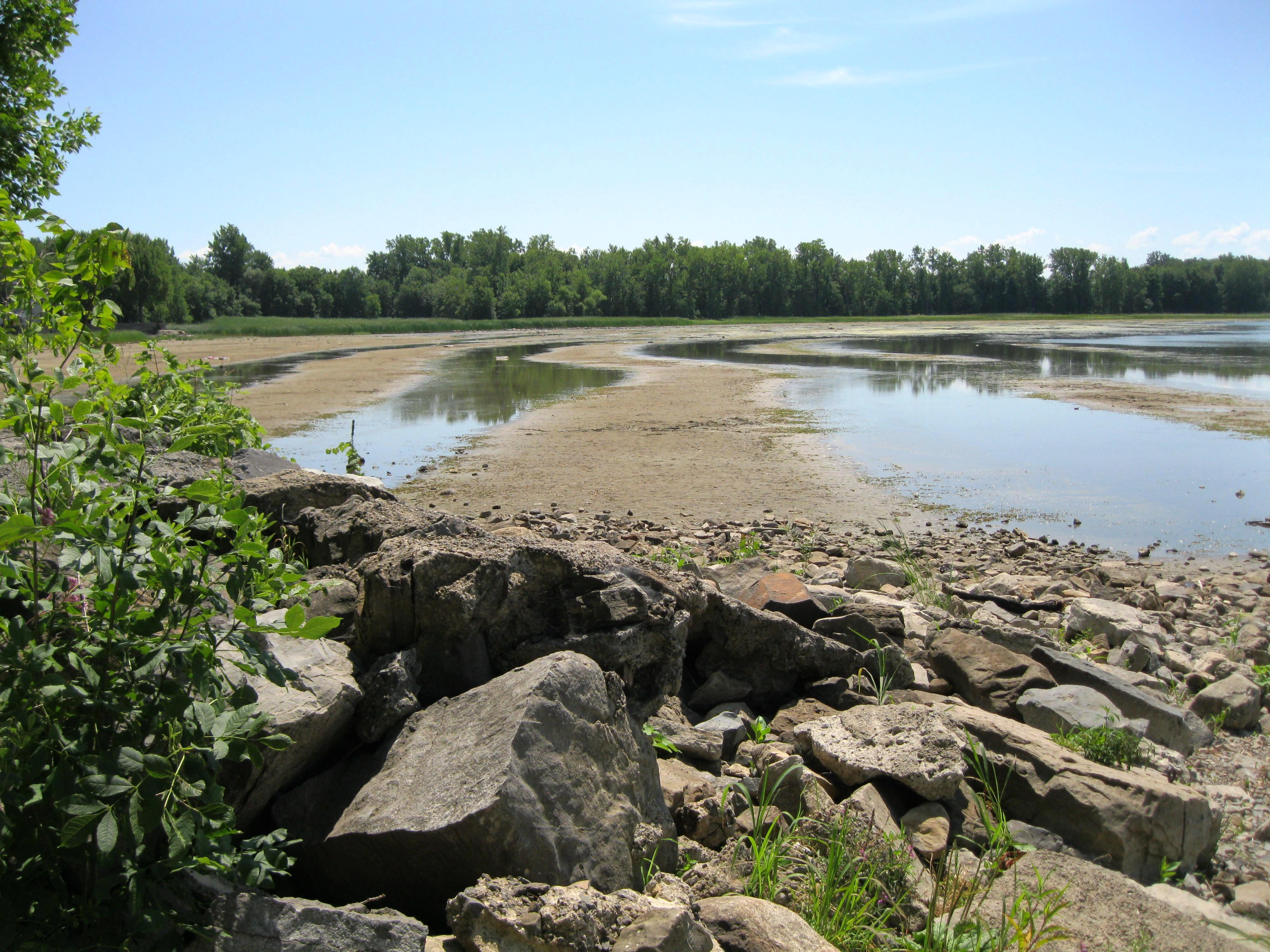
- A wetland in the park

- Location within Montreal
- Type: Nature park
- Location: Pierrefonds-Roxboro, Montreal, Quebec, Canada
- Coordinates: 45°26′45″N 73°54′58″W
- Area: 196 hectares (480 acres)
- Operator: City of Montreal
- Open: sunrise to sunset
- Status: Open all year
- Website: Official website

L'Anse-à-l'Orme Nature Park is a large nature park in the Pierrefonds-Roxboro borough of Montreal, Quebec, Canada.

Senneville Road, opens onto a vast expanse of water, a widening of the Lake of Two Mountains, called l'Anse à l'Orme (English: Elm Cove). The L'Anse-à-l'Orme Nature Park, which belongs to the city of Montreal, has an area of 220 hectares (540 acres). The park extends along the cove for about 1 kilometre (0.62 mi), on both sides of the mouth of the Rivière à l'Orme (English: Elm River). From the Lake of Two Mountains, the park area extends inland for an approximately 4 kilometres (2.5 mi) long corridor along the line the banks of the Rivière à l'Orme.

== History ==
Some believed that the name would indicate the presence of elms (French: orme) here. Others say that the place name commemorates Julien Hubert dit Delorme to whom the land adjacent to the cove (French: anse) had been granted in 1698. The name "Rivière Anse à l'Orme" can be found on maps starting in 1744, on which the name appears to refer to as the cove as well.

On 17 September 2008 the city of Montreal announced a 180 hectares (440 acres) expansion of the park. The enlarged area is composed mostly of marshland west of Pierrefonds-Roxboro.

The park's area was further enlarged when, in 2011, an additional 31 hectares (77 acres) of land belonging to Investissement Québec in the Rivière à l'Orme ecoterritory in the neighbouring municipality of Sainte-Anne-de-Bellevue was annexed to it. This expansion ensured the conservation of the pockets of forests and wetlands, in addition to adding to the numerous trails used for walking and biking and recreational areas.

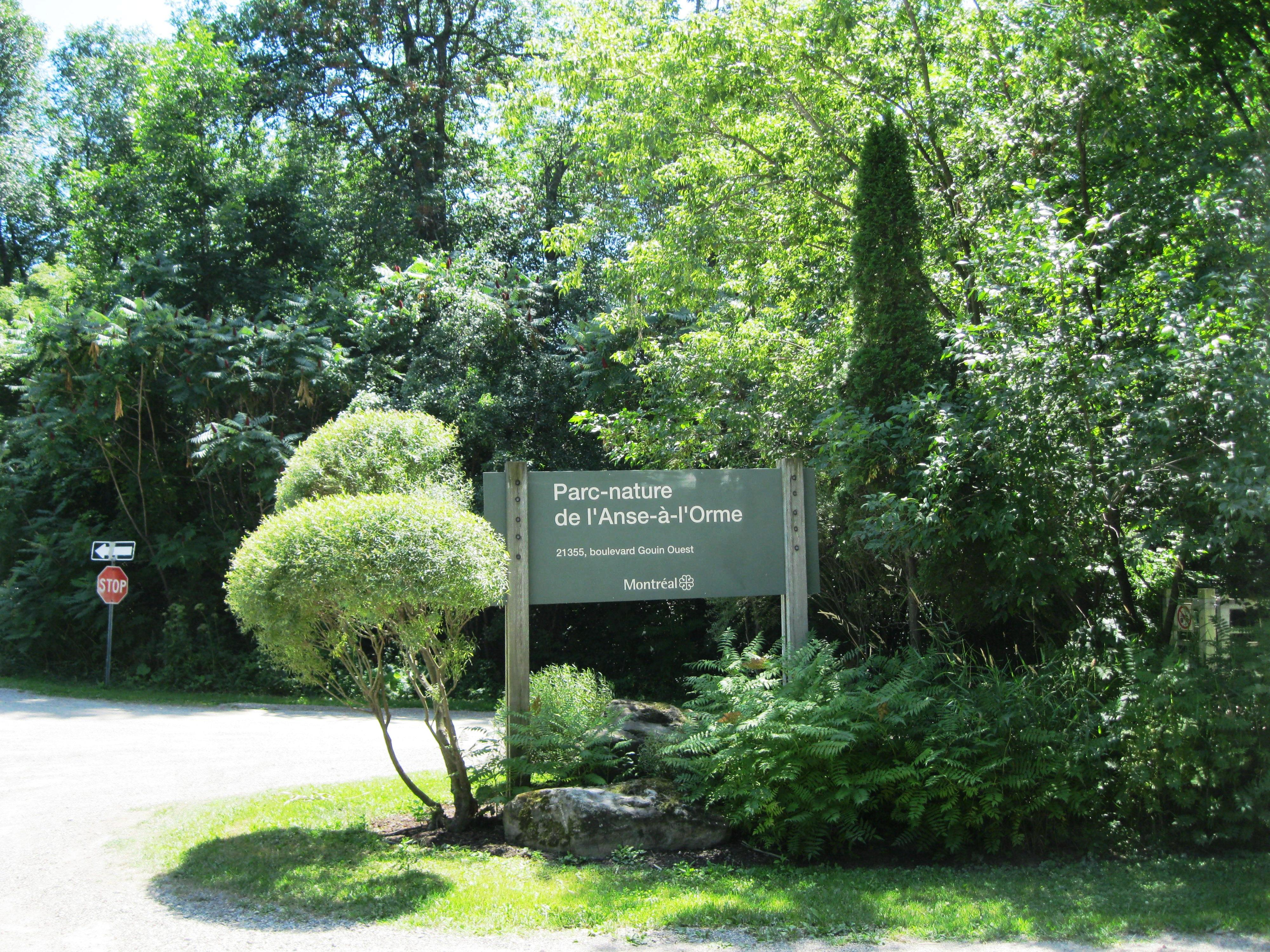
Entrance to the park.

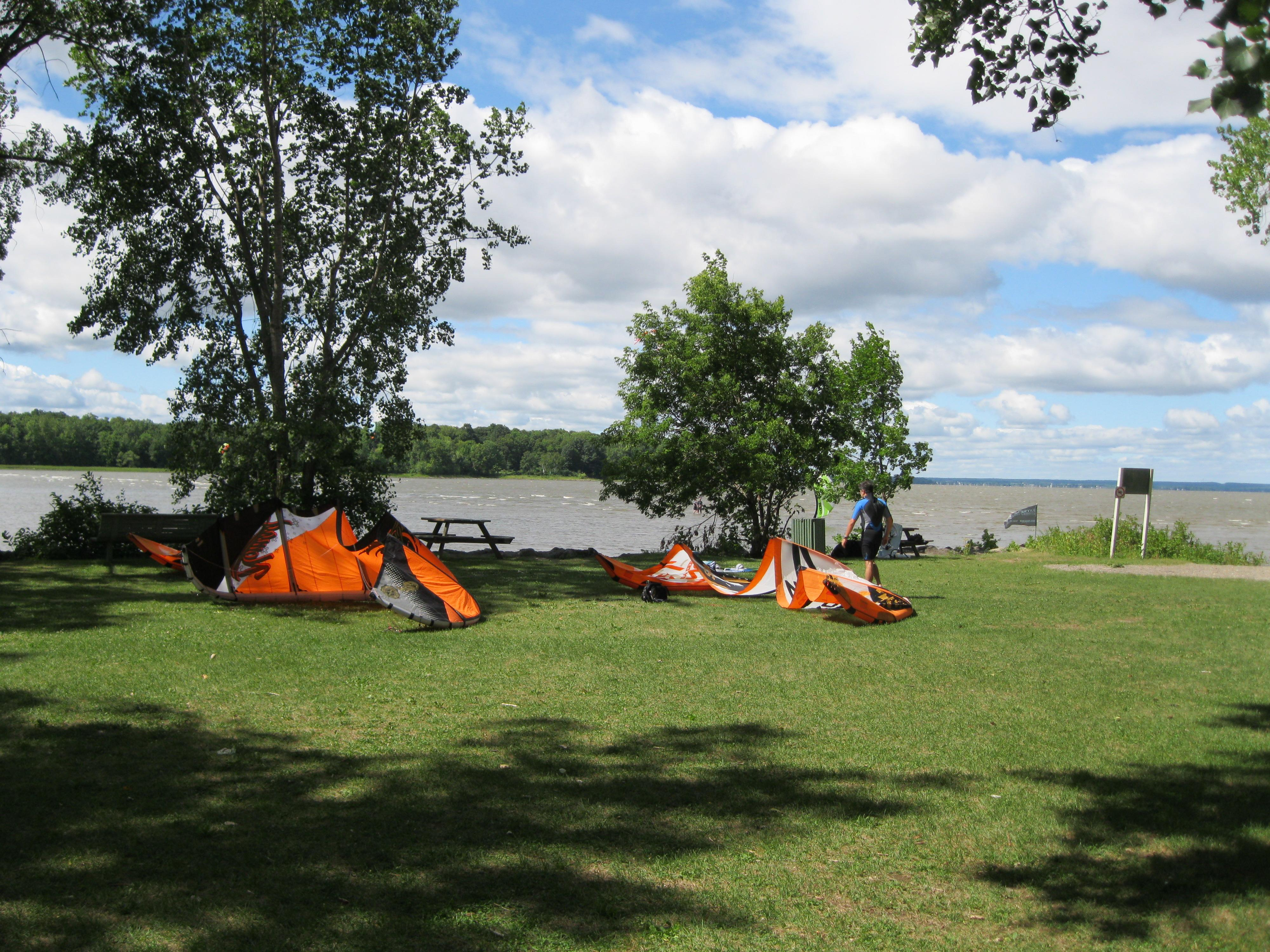
Recreational area of the park.

== Plans ==
As of 2020, the City of Montreal has a plan to include the park into the future Grand Parc de l'Ouest.
