= Peace Park (Montreal) =

Coordinates: 45.5094°N 73.5622°W

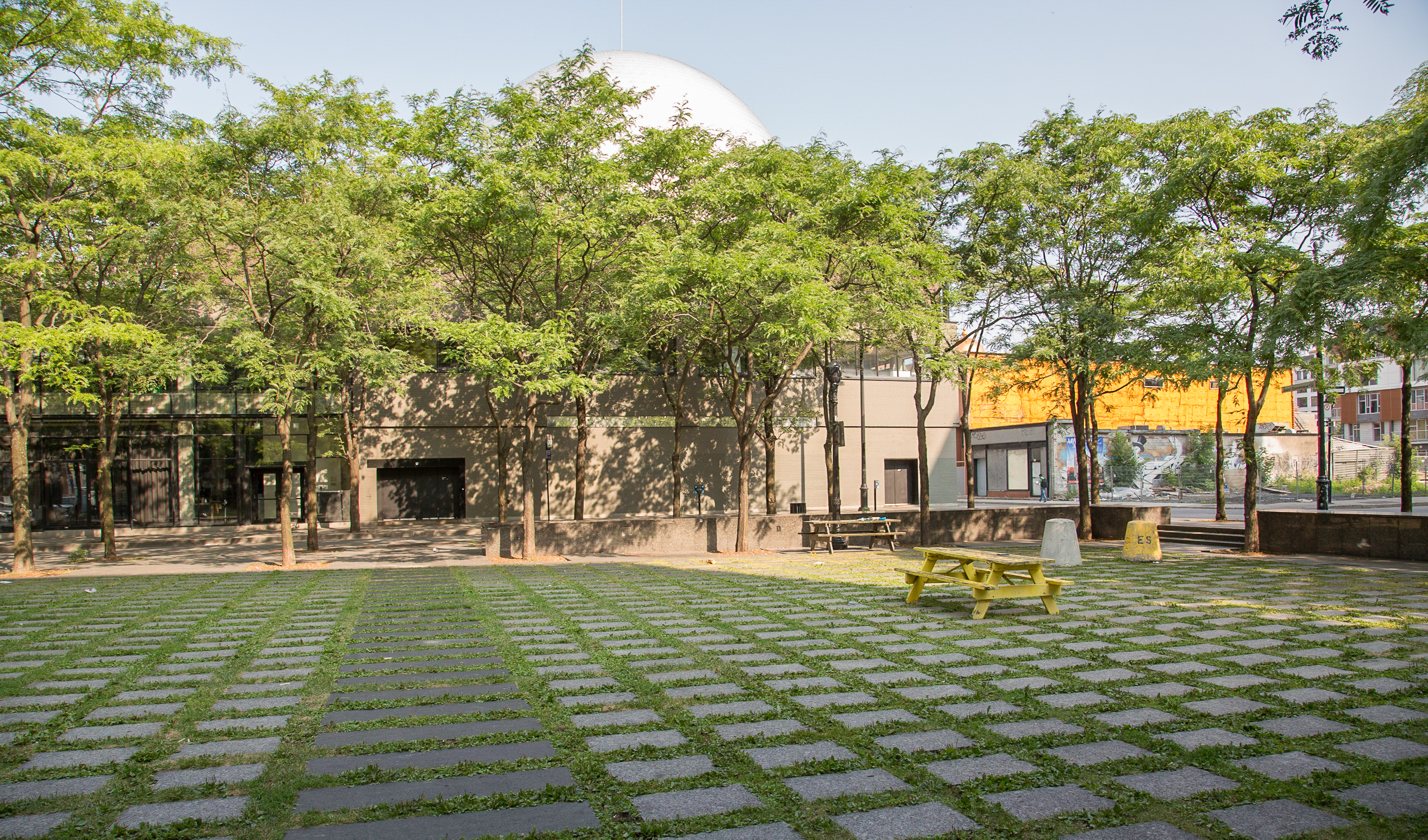
Peace Park in Montréal

Peace Park or Place de la Paix is an urban square in Montreal. Peace Park is the colloquial name for Place de la Paix, which directly translates to "Place of Peace". Often, even in French newspapers, Place de la Paix is referred to as "Parc de la Paix". It is on Saint-Laurent Boulevard and, as such, it follows different by-laws than parks. For example, Peace Park is open to the public at all times, unlike parks with visiting hours.

== History ==
The decision to build Peace Park came during Jean Doré’s administration after he helped Montreal become a Nuclear Free Zone in 1986. With Montréal’s new commitment to peace the mayor Jean Doré announced in 1989 that he would build a place of peace in remembrance of the tragedies of nuclear warfare, located on Saint-Laurent Boulevard in front of the Monument-National and the Montreal Pool Room.

The park was designed by Robert Desjardins and was inaugurated on 20 November 1994. It is largely constructed of granite with grass around granite tiles in the middle, and with trees contouring the park. The park originally had green metal benches under the trees that surrounded the park, but they were removed in 2005 to help with the gentrification of the area. Montreal’s city officials are trying to "clean up" Peace Park, meaning that they want to decrease the amount of alcoholics, homeless, drugs, and prostitutes who are there due to its location at the center of the red light district in the heart of Montreal.

As of 2018, MQC, along with the Society for Arts and Technology and an architecture firm, are working on a possible proposal to renovate the park.

== Skateboarding ==
Peace Park has appeared in many skateboard videos, magazine, and books because of its design, which embodies long, high, and wide granite ledges, and stairs. The layout allows for good flow when rolling around the park. Being centrally located in the city of Montreal the park also serves as a meeting place for many skateboarders.

In 2014, the city allowed skateboarding in the park temporarily and in 2015 skateboarding was permanently legalized in the park. Previously, skateboarding was not legal in the park; city by-laws were enforced with hefty tickets. In 2004 the Société des arts technologiques, which is across the street from the Peace Park put together a project with the aim of legalizing skateboarding, by incorporating it with the Quartier des spectacles, but the proposal was initially refused by the city. Despite skateboarding having previously been against the law, the park's reputation continues to grow.

Adding to the skateboard presence in the park, Temple Skate Supply moved their store to 1201 St-Dominique in 2007, which is across the street from Peace Park.

== Documentary ==
In 2001, local skateboarder David 'Boots' Bouthillier began filming the parks activities. After accumulating extensive footage over time, the park's history, natives, and its vibrant visitors inspired him to release a narrated feature-length documentary on the park. The documentary titled Peace Park / Place de la Paix for which he received grants from the Conseil des arts et des lettres du Québec, the Canada Council for the Arts, and support from the La Société des arts Technologiques was released in 2013 as an MQC production.

== Events ==
- Represent 2004 - MC's, DJ's, Breakdance, Grattiti
- Represent 2005 - MC's, DJ's, Breakdance, Grattiti et Skateboard
- Peace Pressure 2006 -Best Trick Skateboard Contest
- Under Pressure 2008 - International Graffiti Convention
- Under Pressure 2009 - International Graffiti Convention
- Festival de la Rue 2009

== Access ==
- Saint-Laurent station (Montreal Metro)
- Place-d'Armes station
