= Bisson =

Bisson is a surname, and may refer to:

- Alexandre Bisson (1848–1912), French playwright and novelist
- Auguste-Rosalie Bisson (1826–1900), French photographer, brother of Louis-Auguste Bisson
- Baptiste Pierre Bisson (1767–1811), French general of the Napoleonic Wars
- Chris Bisson (born 1975), British actor
- Christophe Bisson, international film director
- Claude Bisson (1931–2024), Canadian judge
- Corey Bisson (born 1993), American cricketer
- Élie-Hercule Bisson (1833–1907), Canadian notary and political figure in Quebec
- Federico Bisson (1936–1998), Italian former triple jumper
- Fernand Bisson de la Roque (1885–1958), French Egyptologist and archaeologist
- Frédérique Vallet-Bisson (1862–1949), French painter
- Gilles Bisson (born 1957), Canadian politician
- Gordon Bisson (1918–2010), New Zealand Court of Appeal judge and a member of the Privy Council of the United Kingdom
- Ivan Bisson (born 1946), Italian basketball player
- Karina Bisson (born 1966), American international lawn and indoor bowler
- Linda Bisson, American rained yeast geneticist who focuses on sugar catabolism and fermentation
- Louis-Auguste Bisson (1814–1876), French photographer, brother of Auguste-Rosalie Bisson
- Louis Bisson (1909–1997), Canadian aviator
- Lucienne Bisson (1880–1939), French artist
- Raoul du Bisson (fl. 1863–65), French nobleman and adventurer in the Sudan
- Sandrine Bisson (born 1975), Canadian actress
- Terry Bisson (1942–2024), American science fiction and fantasy author
- Thomas Arthur Bisson (1900–1979), American political writer, journalist, and government official
- Thomas N. Bisson (1931–2025), American historian, medievalist, academic and author
- Yannick Bisson (born 1969), Canadian film and television actor

== See also ==
- French destroyer Bisson
- Bissonnette
- Bissonnet
