= Bissonnette =

Bissonnet, Bissonette or Bissonnette is a surname. Notable people with the surname include:

== Bissonnet ==
- Alfred Pike Bissonnet (1914–1979), Canadian diplomat
- Michel Bissonnet (born 1942), Canadian politician, Speaker of the Quebec National Assembly
- Bissonnet Street in Houston, Texas, USA

== Bissonette ==
- Charles Arthur Bissonette (1896–1971), American pilot
- Del Bissonette (1899–1972), American first baseman, manager and coach in Major League Baseball
- Gregg Bissonette (born 1959), American drummer
- Matt Bissonette (born 1961), American bass player and the brother of drummer Gregg Bissonette
- Rolland Bissonette (born 1997), Canadian drag queen

== Bissonnette ==
- Alexandre Bissonnette (born 1989), Canadian mass murderer
- André Bissonnette (born 1945), Canadian businessman and politician
- Anik Bissonnette (born 1962), Canadian dancer
- Bernard Bissonnette (1898–1964), lawyer, merchant, educator, judge and political figure in Quebec
- Father Bernard Bissonnette, central figure in the Bridgeport child abuse scandal
- Big Bill Bissonnette (1937–2018), American jazz trombonist and producer
- J.-Eugène Bissonnette (1892–1980), Canadian politician and physician
- Gaétan Bissonnette (born 1958), Canadian murderer of actress Denise Morelle
- Joel Bissonnette, American actor
- Lise Bissonnette (born 1945), Canadian writer
- Matt Bissonnette (disambiguation), several people
- Michael D. Bissonnette, American politician
- Paul Bissonnette (born 1985), Canadian ice hockey player
- Pierre-André Bissonnette (died 1989), Canadian diplomat

== See also ==
- Bissonette
- Bisson
