= Bisaillon =

Bisaillon is a surname

== People with the surname ==
- Chris Bisaillon, retired American football player
- Guy Bisaillon (1939–2017), Canadian politician
- Marc Bisaillon, Canadian film director and screenwriter from Quebec
- Natalie Bisaillon, Canadian politician
- Peter Bisaillon (1662–1742), New France fur trader and interpreter
- Sébastien Bisaillon (born 1986), Canadian former professional ice hockey defenceman

== See also ==
- Baillon
- Bissonnette
- Bertillon
