= Bissaillon (surname) =

Bissaillon is a surname, that is sometimes spelled Bisaillon and may refer to:

- Jake Bissaillon
- Peter Bisaillon
- Chris Bisaillon
