= Albert Southworth =

American photographer

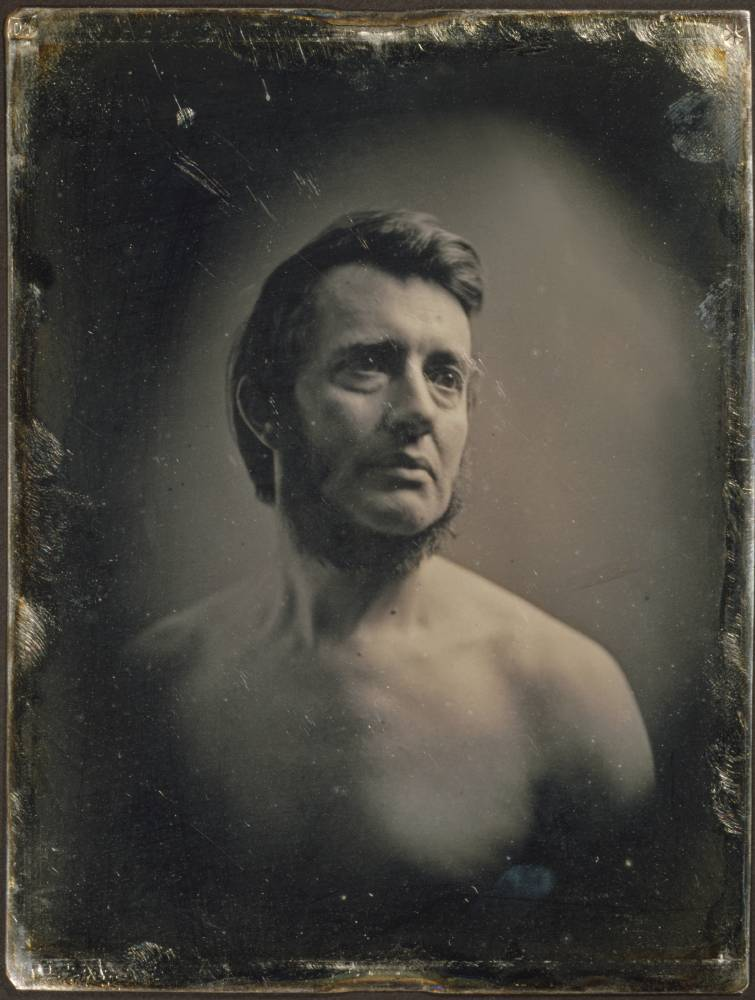
Albert Southworth, circa 1848

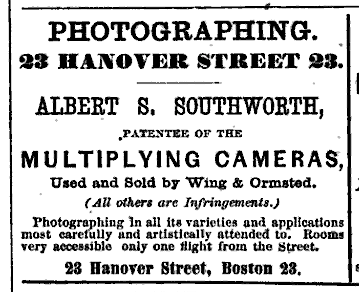
Advertisement for Southworth studio on Hanover Street, Boston, 1868

Albert Sands Southworth (1811–1894) operated Southworth & Hawes daguerreotype studio with Josiah Johnson Hawes (1808–1901) from 1843 to 1863.

== Biography ==
Southworth was a student of Samuel F.B. Morse, who, in addition to his other more famous pursuits, was an avid daguerreotypist. The partnership's studio, located on the top floor of a Boston building, had enormous skylights to allow in copious amounts of light necessary for relatively "short" exposures of portraits of their subjects. While they worked in formats ranging from the more common locket-sized daguerreotype, up to a stereoscopic image (also gaining in popularity at the time), they specialized in "whole plate" images, an expensive size which measured 6 1/2 by 8 1/2 inches (17 cm × 22 cm)—rather large for a daguerreotype. Lawmaker Daniel Webster, author Harriet Beecher Stowe, and reformer Dorothea Dix were among the duo's more prominent clients, but they also photographed local businessmen, society ladies, and other Boston-area citizens.

Southworth & Hawes were not alone: Masury & Silsby, and also John Adams Whipple were prominent Boston daguerreotypists. Whipple's and Southworth & Hawes's operations were the largest in Boston, and were outshone in America (after 1853) only by the New York studios of Mathew Brady and M.M. Lawrence.

In what could perhaps be called the ancestor of the View-master, Southworth & Hawes invented a "grand parlor stereoscope", which allowed viewers to be presented with new daguerreotype views with the turn of a crank. Southworth & Hawes had one of these devices in the reception room of their gallery for the entertainment of their customers.

After wet-process plate printing came into vogue, Southworth also invented a device in 1855 that allowed up to eight exposures of the same sitter to be made in just two sequential exposures: by exposing half of a whole plate with a special four-lensed set of tubes, then moving the other half of the plate into place, the other half of the plate was then exposed.
