= Samuel Masury =

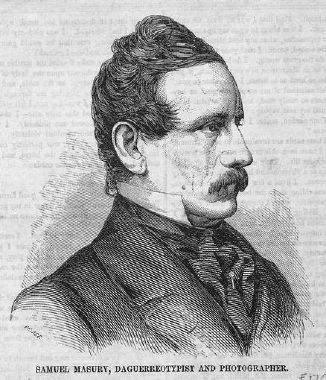
Portrait of Masury by Winslow Homer, 1859

Samuel Masury (ca. 1818–1874) was a photographer in 19th-century Boston, Massachusetts. He trained with photographer John Plumbe around 1842. In 1853-1855 he partnered with G.M. Silsbee as "Masury & Silsbee", daguerreotypists, on Washington Street. Masury "traveled to Paris in 1855 to learn the glass negative process from the Bisson brothers, whose landscapes and architectural views were internationally celebrated." By 1858 he ran his own studio in Boston, on Washington Street. He presented work in the 1860 exhibition of the Massachusetts Charitable Mechanic Association.
