= Josiah Johnson Hawes =

American photographer (1808–1901)

Coordinates: 42°21′37.32″N 71°3′39.32″W

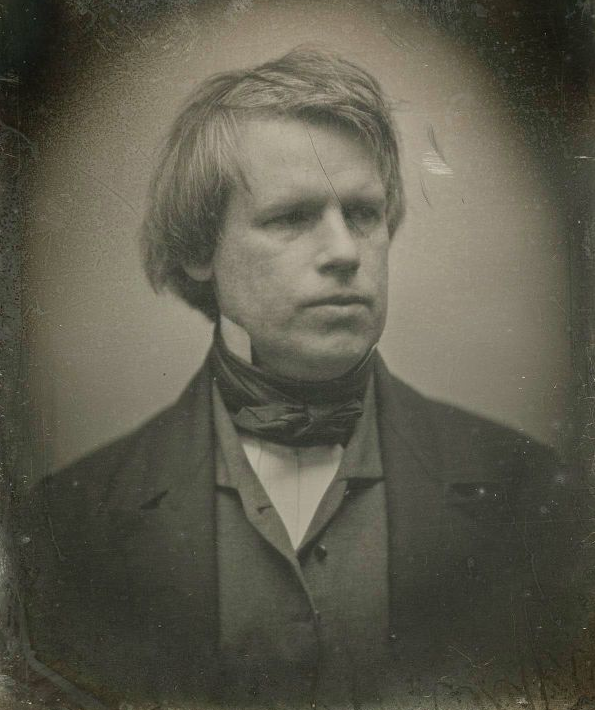
Josiah J. Hawes, c. 1850-1855

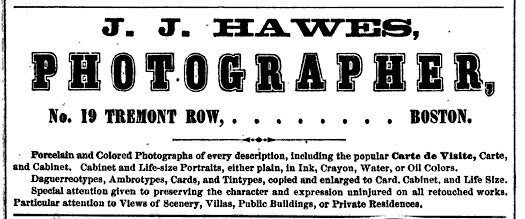
Advertisement for J.J. Hawes, Boston, 1868

Josiah Johnson Hawes (1808–1901) was a photographer in Boston, Massachusetts. He and Albert Southworth established the photography studio of Southworth & Hawes, which produced numerous portraits of exceptional quality in the 1840s–1860s.

== Biography ==
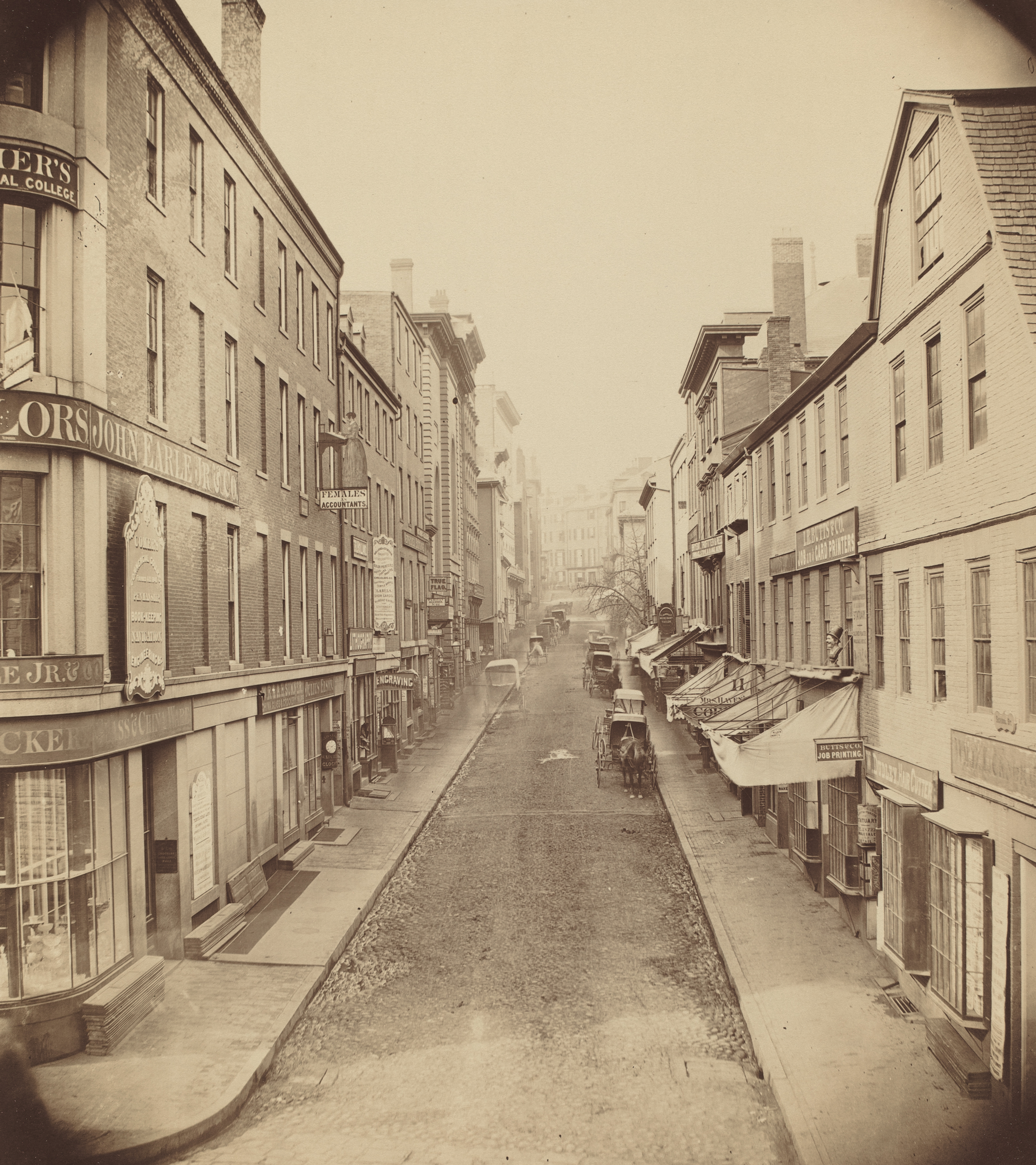
School Street, Boston, 1850s, National Gallery of Art

J.J. Hawes was born in Wayland, Massachusetts in 1808. He began his career as a portrait painter. He then studied photography in Boston with Francis Fauvel-Gouraud.

In 1843 Hawes and Southworth formed the partnership of Southworth & Hawes, with studios on Tremont Row, in Boston's Scollay Square. The studio produced daguerreotype portraits of many notables, including Lemuel Shaw, Henry Wadsworth Longfellow, Daniel Webster, and others. The studio rooms overlooked "a fine orchard, belonging to the Gardiner Greene estate. From these windows, facing Scollay Sq., we looked on the church and gardens of Brattle Street"

In 1849 Hawes married Nancy Niles Southworth (Albert’s sister). They had three children: Alice, Marion and Edward.

After the partnership with Southworth dissolved in 1863, Hawes continued as a photographer on Tremont Row for several decades, through the 1890s. In his later years he was known as the "oldest working photographer in this country."

== Image gallery ==
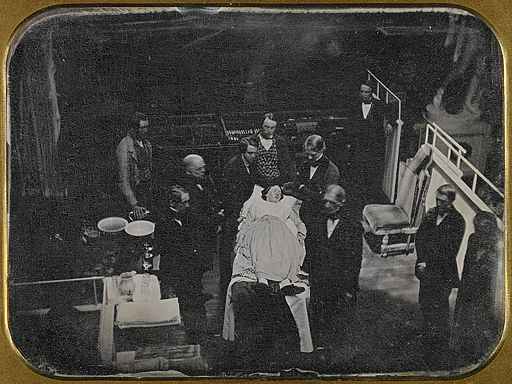
Demonstration of the Surgical Use of Ether, 1847

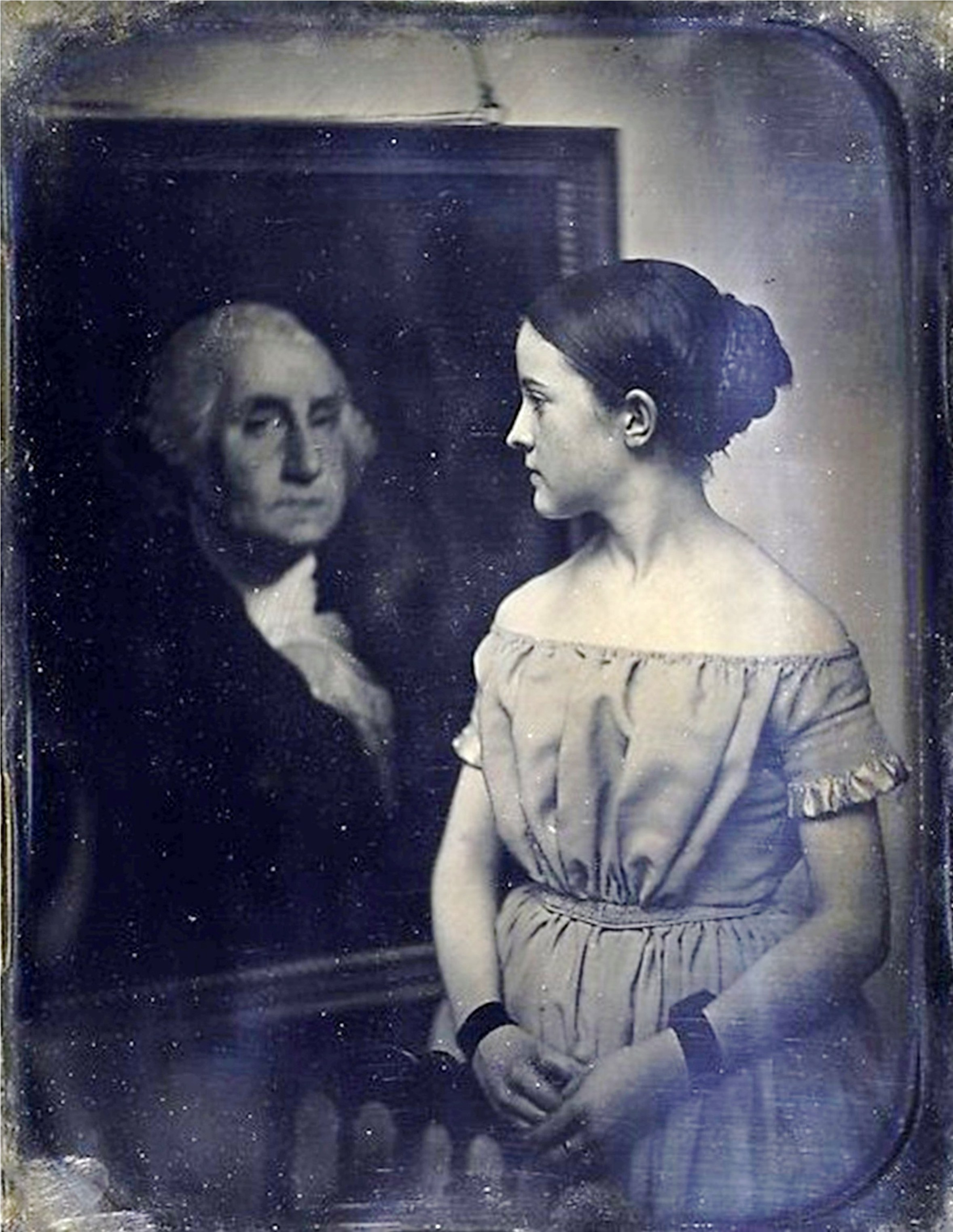
Young girl with portrait of George Washington, c. 1850

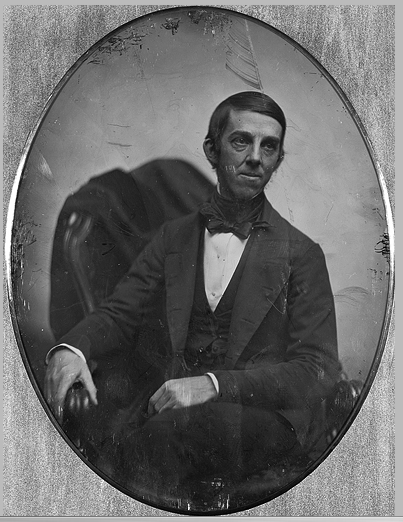
Oliver Wendell Holmes Sr., c. 1850-1856

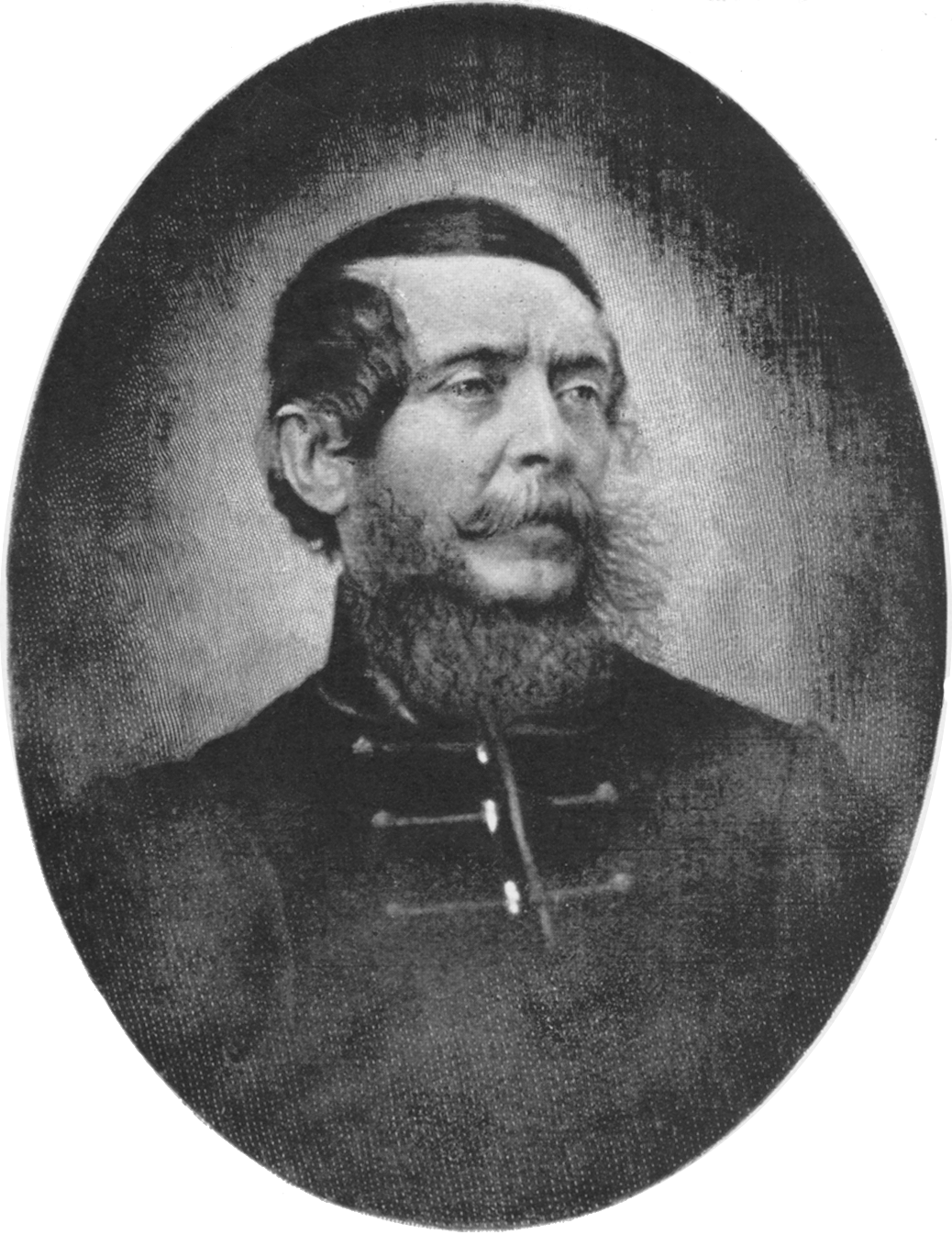
Lajos Kossuth, 1851

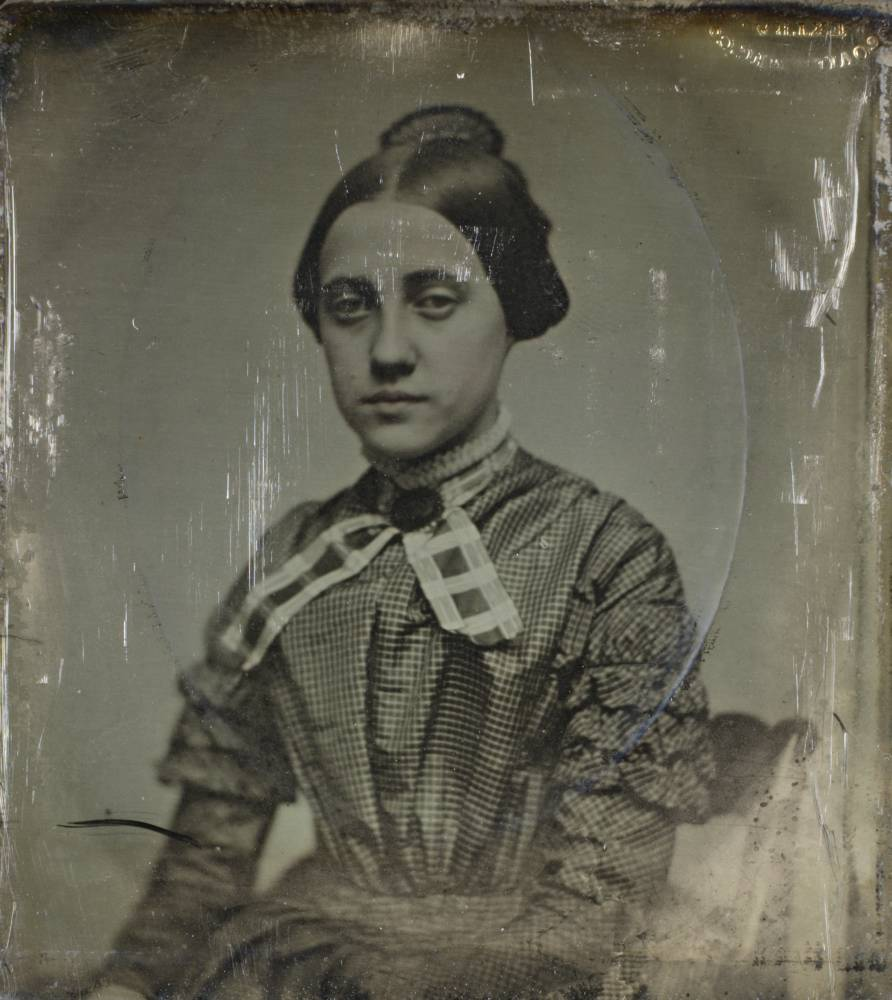
Unidentified woman, by Southworth & Hawes, c. 1852

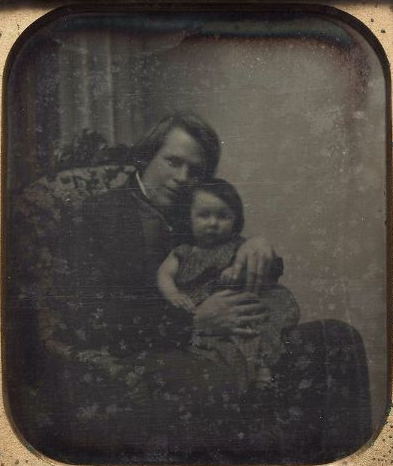
Portrait of J.J. Hawes and his daughter Marion, by Southworth & Hawes, c. 1852

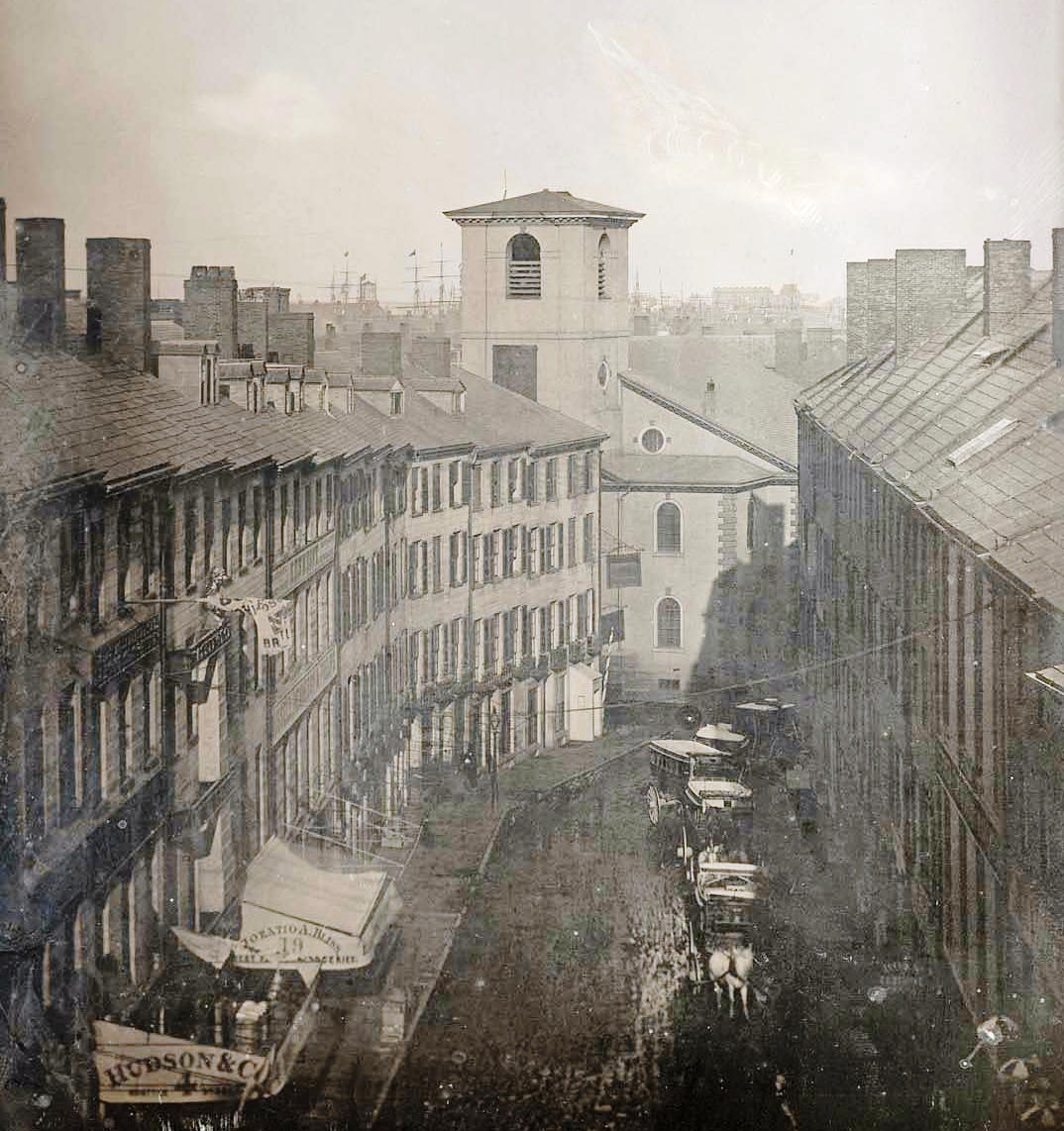
View of Brattle St., 1855

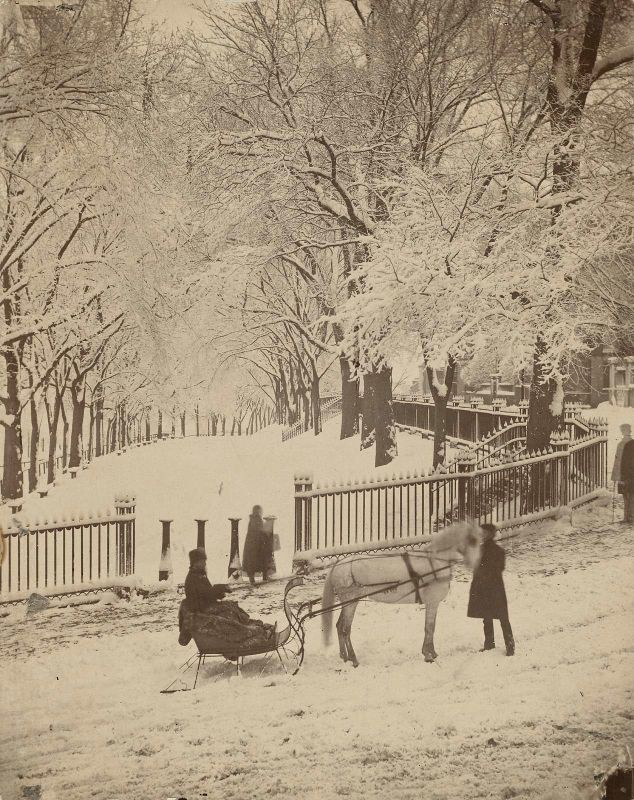
Boston Common, c. 1875

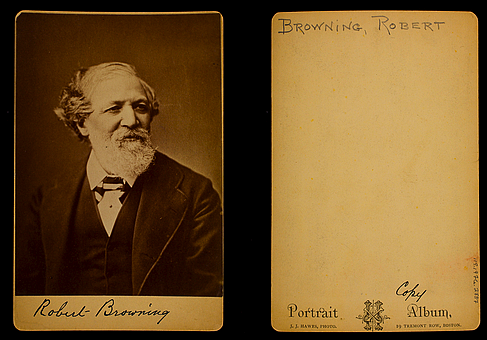
Portrait of Robert Browning, c. 1860s-1880s

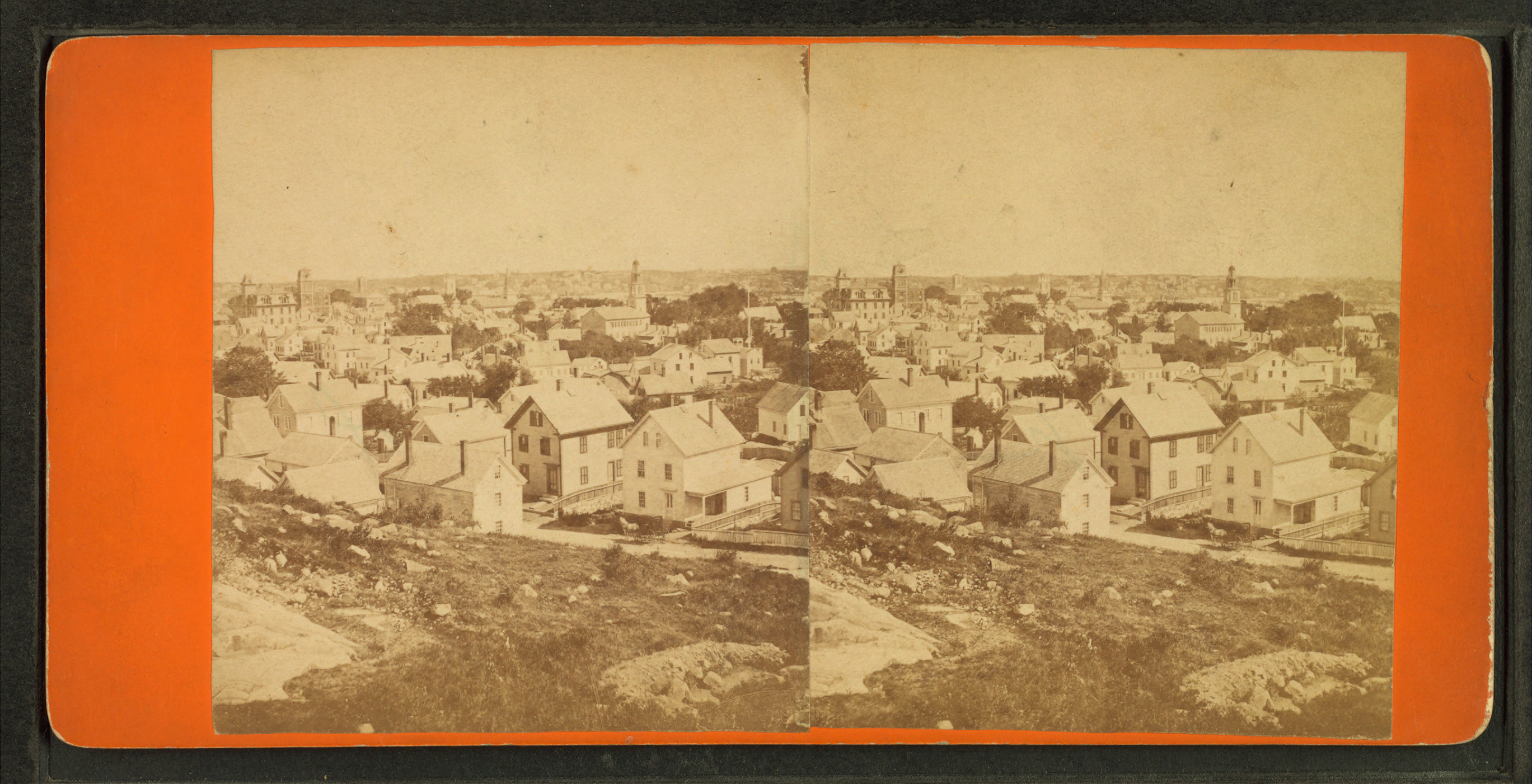
View of Boston, c. 1860s-1880s

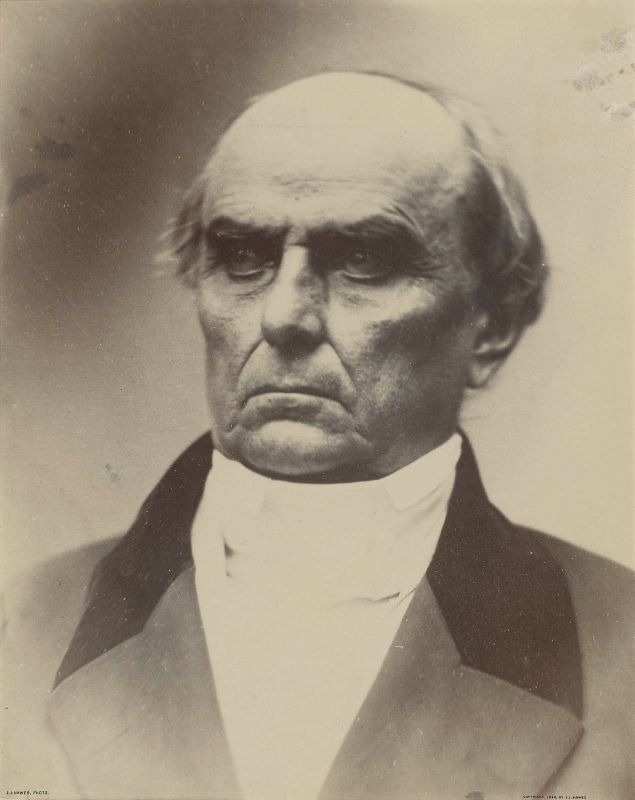
Daniel Webster, c. 1883

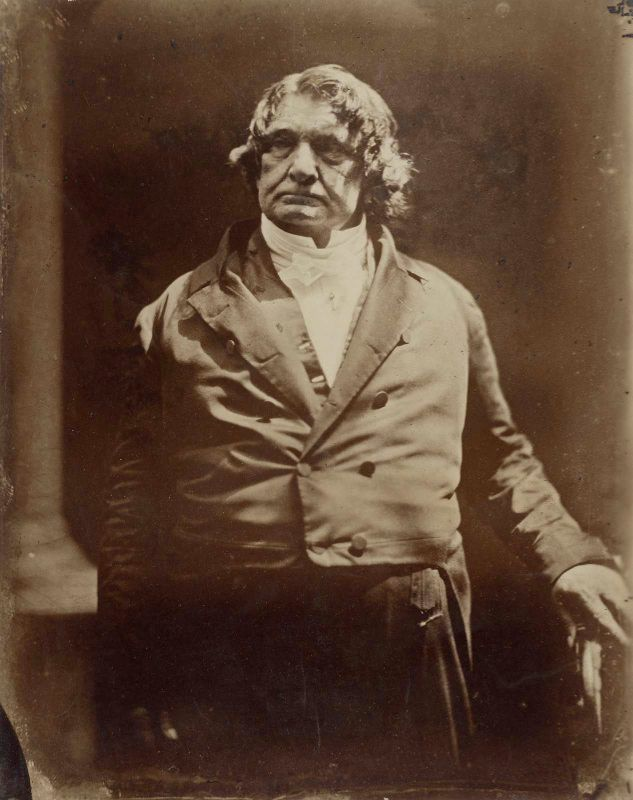
Lemuel Shaw, c. 1883

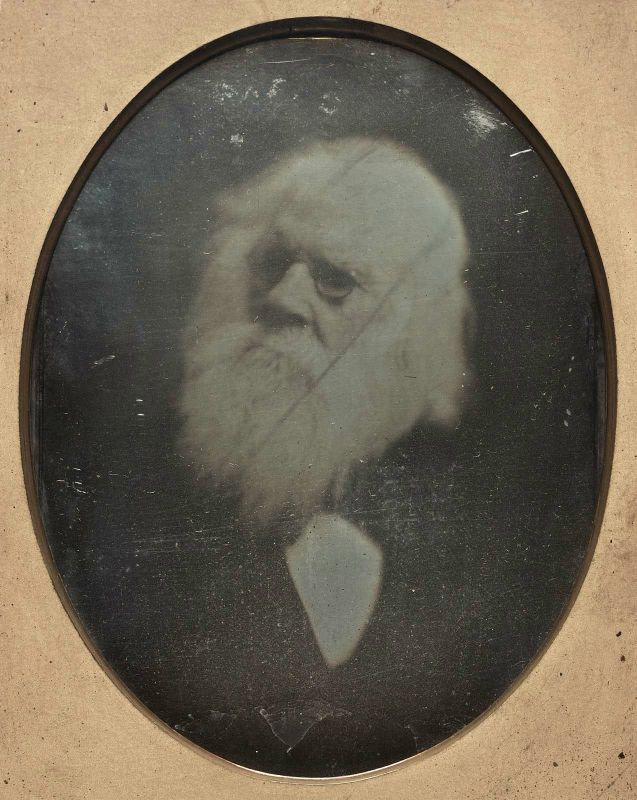
Self-portrait, c. 1890

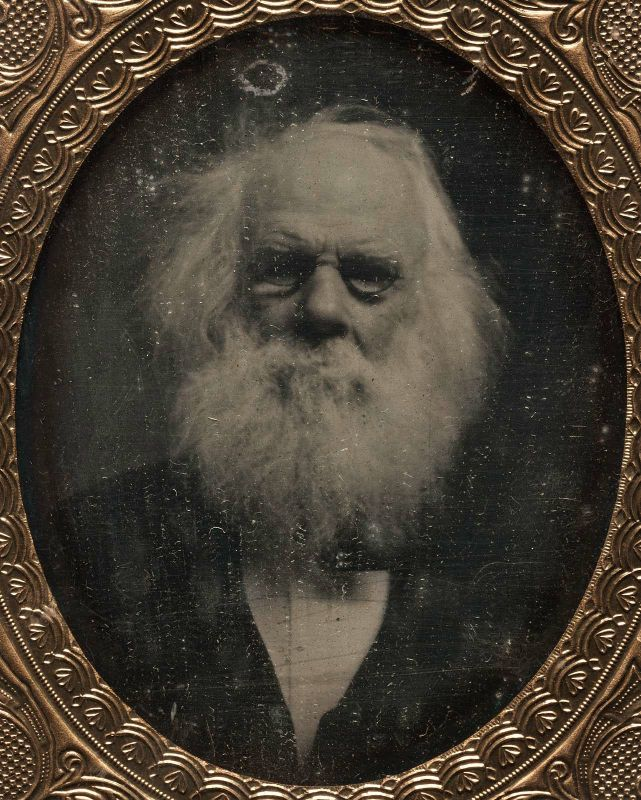
Self-portrait, c. 1890

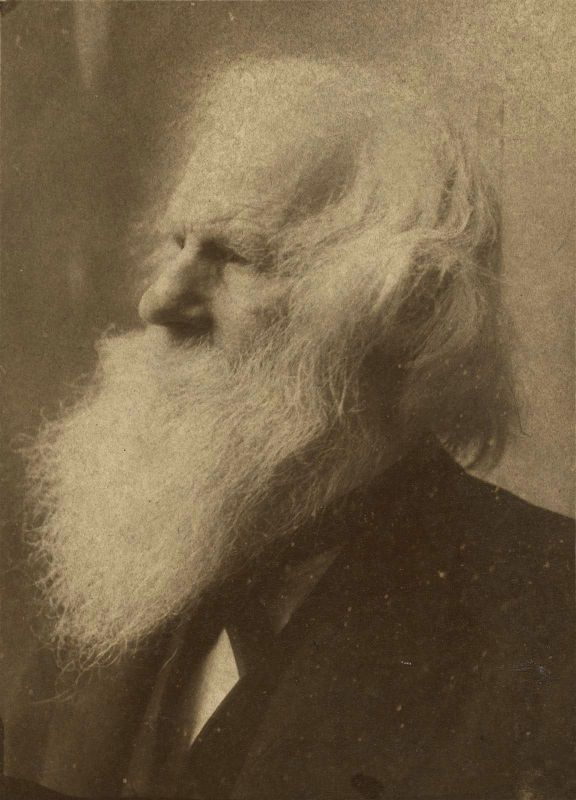
Self-portrait, c. 1895
