= Louis-Bisson Bridge =

Louis Bisson Bridge
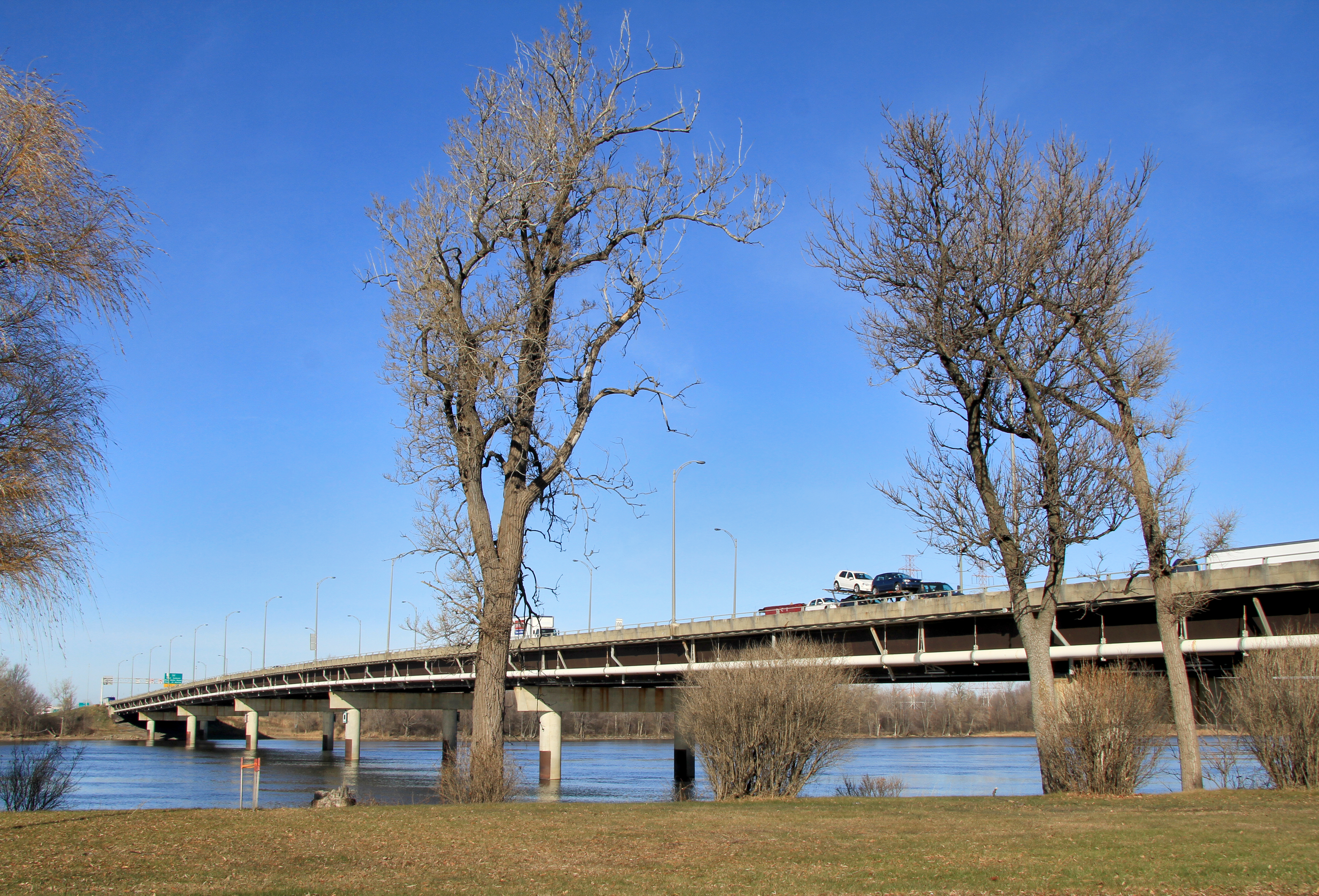
- Louis Bisson Bridge seen from Montreal
- Coordinates: 45°30′39.2″N 73°45′50″W
- Carries: Quebec Autoroute 13
- Crosses: Rivière des Prairies
- Locale: Montreal and Laval, Quebec
- Maintained by: Transports Québec

Statistics
- Daily traffic: 145,000 (2013)

Location
- Interactive map of Louis Bisson Bridge

Louis Bisson Bridge spans the Rivière des Prairies between the eastern tip of Montreal's Pierrefonds-Roxboro borough and the district of Chomedey in Laval, Quebec, Canada. It carries 7 lanes of Quebec Highway 13, including one reversible lane at the centre. That lane is an example of a permanent zipper lane.

The bridge was named after Canadian aviator Louis Bisson.

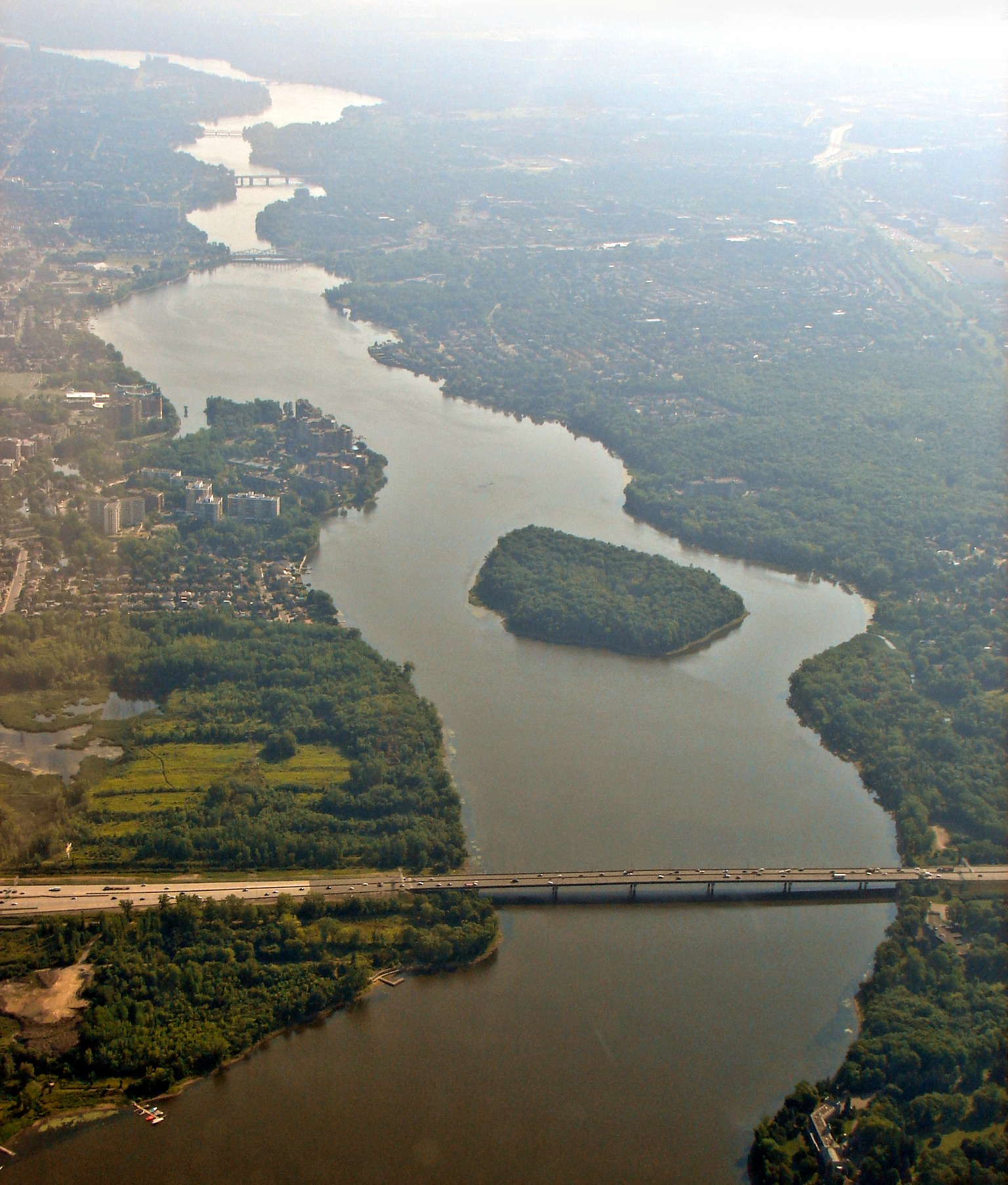
Rivière des Prairies with Louis Bisson Bridge in foreground

== See also ==
- List of bridges in Canada
- List of bridges spanning the Rivière des Prairies
- List of crossings of the Rivière des Prairies
