= Southworth & Hawes =

Photographic firm in Boston (1843–1863)

Coordinates: 42°21′37.32″N 71°3′39.32″W

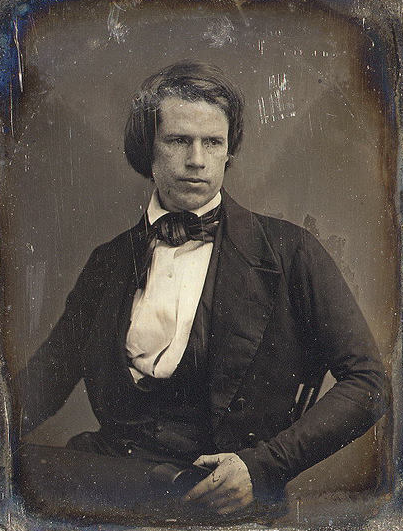
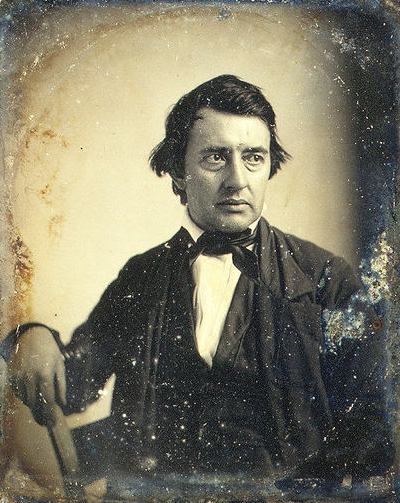
Portrait of J.J. Hawes and self-portrait by Albert Southworth, c. 1845–1850

Southworth & Hawes was an early photographic firm in Boston, 1843–1863. Its partners, Albert Sands Southworth (1811–1894) and Josiah Johnson Hawes (1808–1901), have been hailed as the first great American masters of photography, whose work elevated photographic portraits to the level of fine art. Their images are prominent in every major book and collection of early American photography.

Southworth & Hawes worked almost exclusively in the daguerreotype process. Working in the 8 ½ x 6 ½ inch whole plate format, their images are brilliant, mirror-like, and finely detailed. Writing in the Photographic and Fine Art Journal, August 1855, the contemporary Philadelphia daguerreotypist Marcus Aurelius Root paid them this praise: "Their style, indeed, is peculiar to themselves; presenting beautiful effects of light and shade, and giving depth and roundness together with a wonderful softness or mellowness. These traits have achieved for them a high reputation with all true artists and connoisseurs." He further noted that the firm had devoted their time chiefly to daguerreotypes, with little attention to photography on paper.

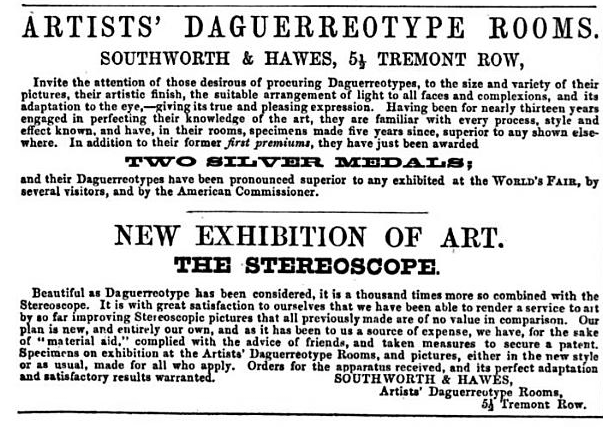
Advertisement for Southworth & Hawes, Tremont Row, Boston, 1852

== History ==
=== Personal and public portraits ===
During their 20 years of collaboration, Southworth & Hawes catered to Boston society and the famous. Their advertisements drew a distinction between the appropriate styles for personal versus public portraiture. "A likeness for an intimate acquaintance or one’s own family should be marked by that amiability and cheerfulness, so appropriate to the social circle and the home fireside. Those for the public, of official dignitaries and celebrated characters admit of more firmness, sternness and soberness." Among their sitters were Louisa May Alcott, Lyman Beecher, Benjamin Butler, William Ellery Channing, Rufus Choate, Cassius Marcellus Clay, Charlotte Cushman, Richard Henry Dana Jr., Dorothea Dix, Ralph Waldo Emerson, Edward Everett, William Lloyd Garrison, Grace Greenwood, Oliver Wendell Holmes, Sam Houston, Thomas Starr King, Louis Kossuth, Jenny Lind, Henry Wadsworth Longfellow, Horace Mann, Donald McKay, Lola Montez, George Peabody, William H. Prescott, Lemuel Shaw, Harriet Beecher Stowe, Charles Sumner, Daniel Webster, John Greenleaf Whittier, and Robert C. Winthrop.

=== Documenting the birth of surgical anesthesia ===
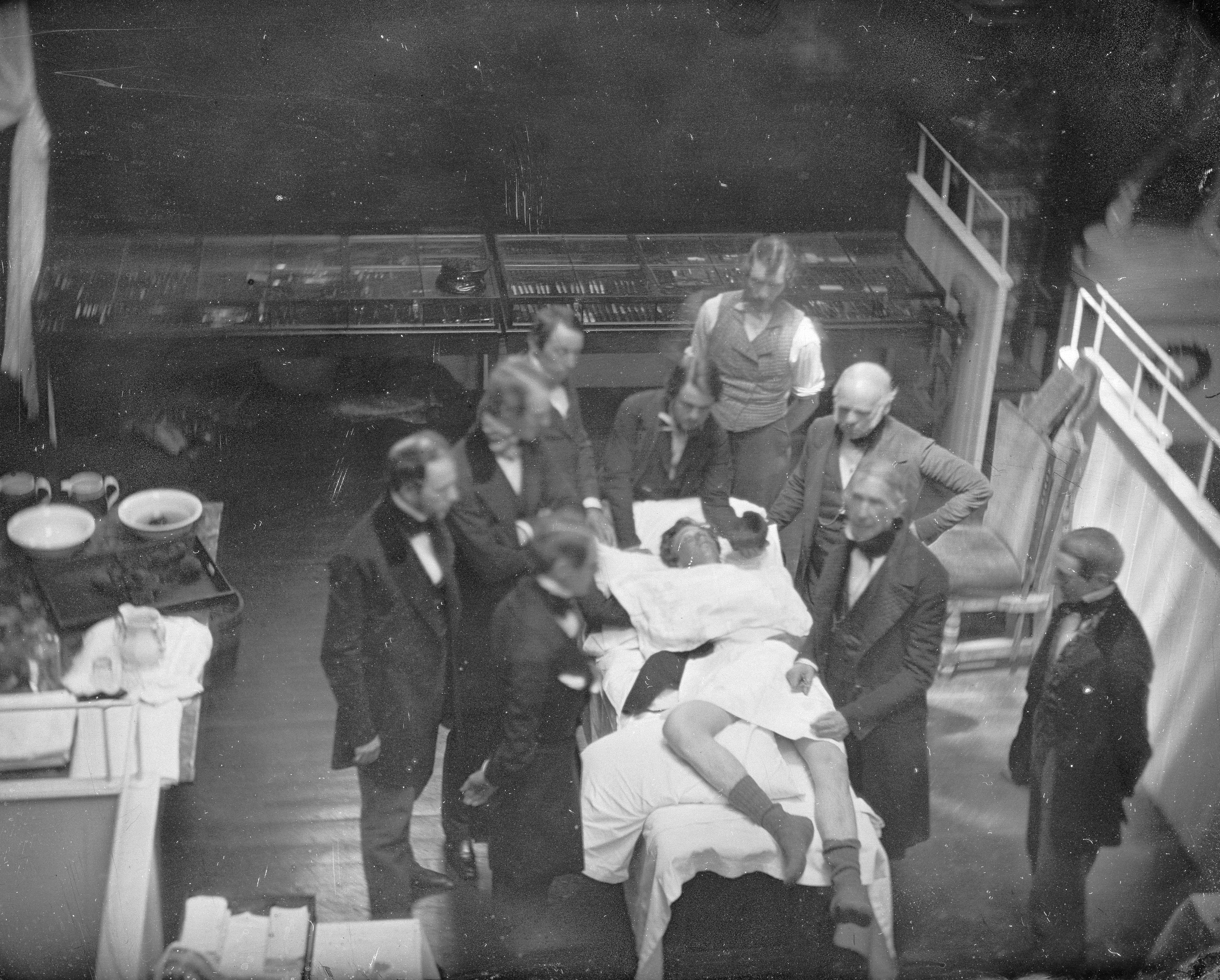
Historic image of an early ether surgery conducted at Massachusetts General Hospital. The daguerreotype was taken by Southworth & Hawes on July 3, 1847.

On the evening of September 30, 1846, Mr. Eben Frost, suffering from a violent toothache, called upon Dr. William Thomas Green Morton, a dentist at No. 19 Tremont Row, Boston. Dr. Morton administered nitrous oxide and extracted the tooth. Less than three weeks later, the so-called "Death of Pain" took place on October 16, when Dr. Morton administered ether to a patient before Dr. John Collins Warren, senior surgeon at the Massachusetts General Hospital, removed a tumor from his neck. Although it is believed that ether anesthesia had been administered for surgery earlier, most notably by Crawford Long in Jefferson, Georgia on March 30, 1843, it had been done privately and not reported in the medical literature. Recognizing the historic significance of the introduction of etherization within a hospital setting, the photographic firm of Southworth & Hawes was commissioned to record several ether surgeries subsequent to the Abbott operation. Legend holds that Hawes fell ill from the sight of blood, and was unable to complete the first of these scheduled photo sessions. He did succeed in photographing three surgeries, however, the first on the following December 9, for Dr. Samuel Parkman's treatment of a dislocated shoulder; and a second session on July 3, 1847, capturing three daguerreotype views of Dr. Warren's surgery on a 19-yr-old Portuguese sailor with a diseased fibula. A third photo session captured a young woman, possibly an epulis patient who was scheduled for surgery that same day. Later Dr. Warren presented his Laundy scalpel and probe, the surgical instruments he used in the first operation, to Hawes in gratitude for recording the operations.

- Ether Dome Daguerreotype No. 1
- Ether Dome Daguerreotype No. 2
- Ether Dome Daguerreotype No. 3
- Ether Dome Daguerreotype No. 4
- Ether Dome Daguerreotype No. 5

=== Dispersion of the archives ===
Hawes lived until 1901, continuing to operate a studio and carefully protecting its sizeable archive. The archives were finally dispersed during the Great Depression. Most made their way into three museums (George Eastman Museum, Metropolitan Museum of Art and Museum of Fine Arts, Boston), while only a comparatively few have ever been privately held. However, on April 27, 1999, a previously unknown hoard of 240 Southworth & Hawes daguerreotypes appeared at Sotheby's auction from the estate of David Feigenbaum. The total sales price realized was $3.3 million.

== Image gallery ==
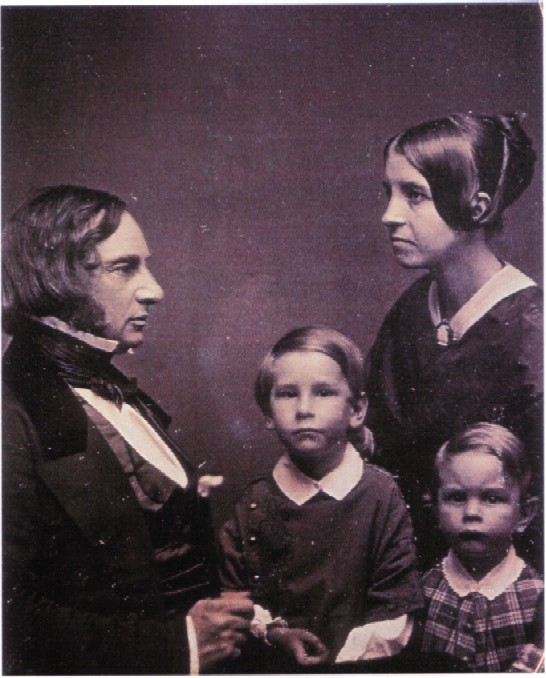
Longfellow family, 1849

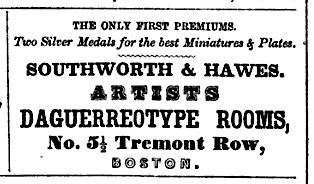
Advertisement, 1849 Boston Directory

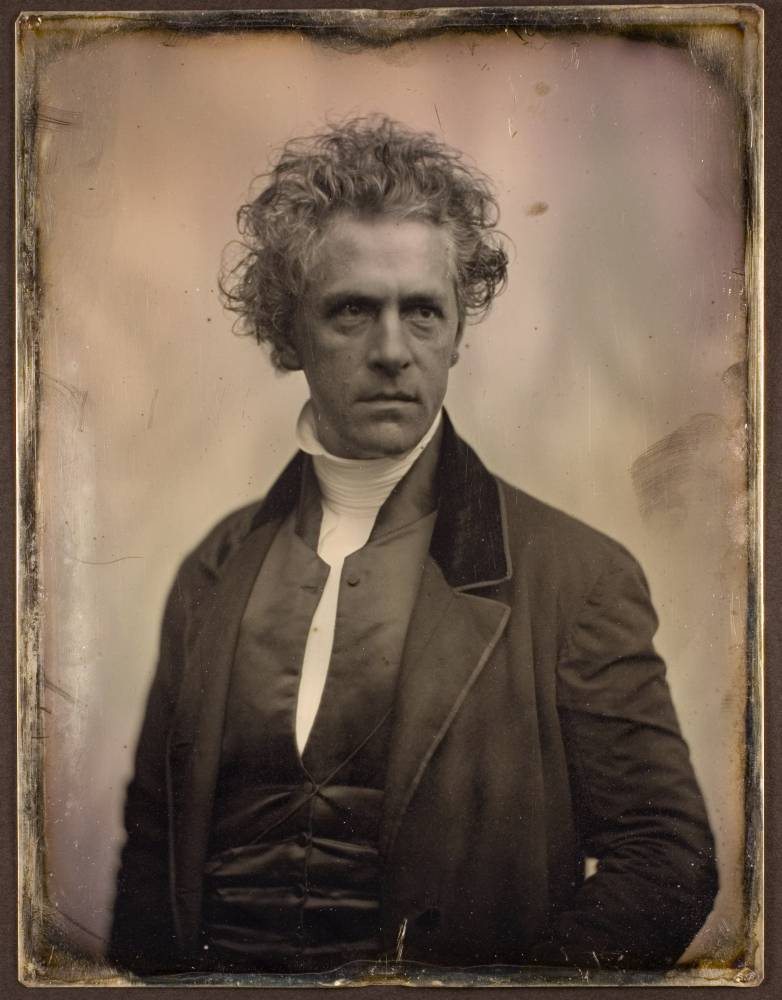
Rollin Heber Neale, ca. 1850

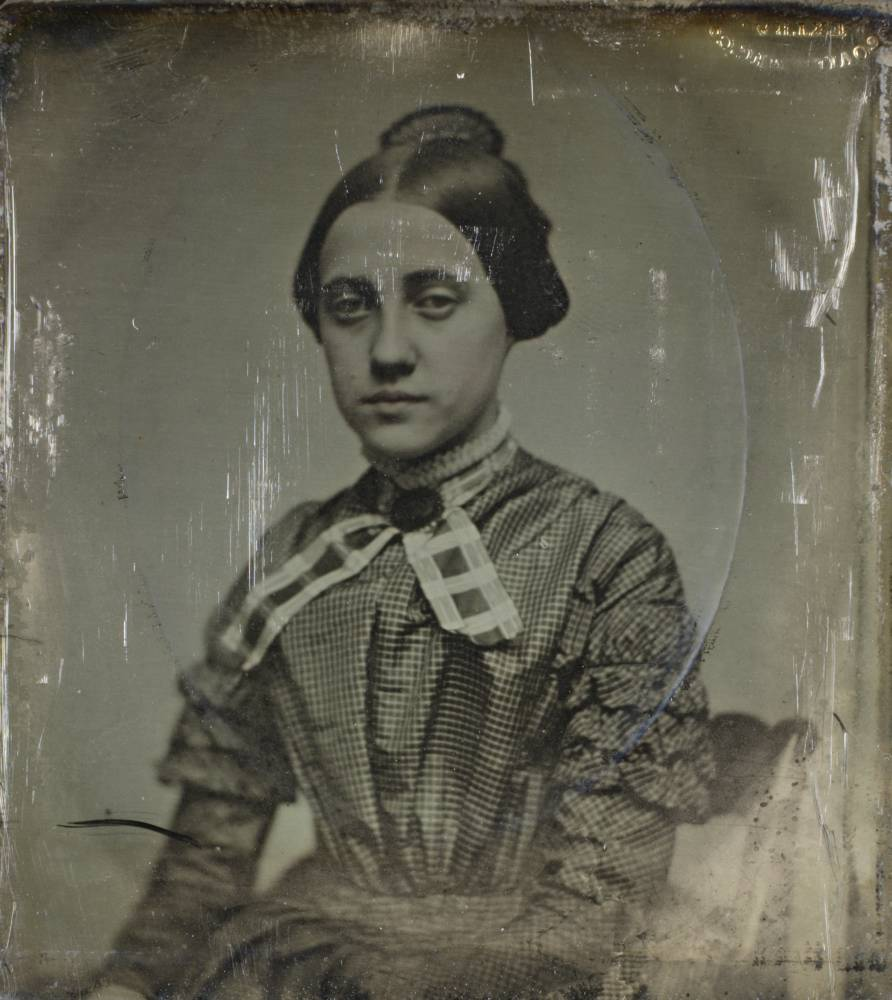
Unidentified woman, ca.1852

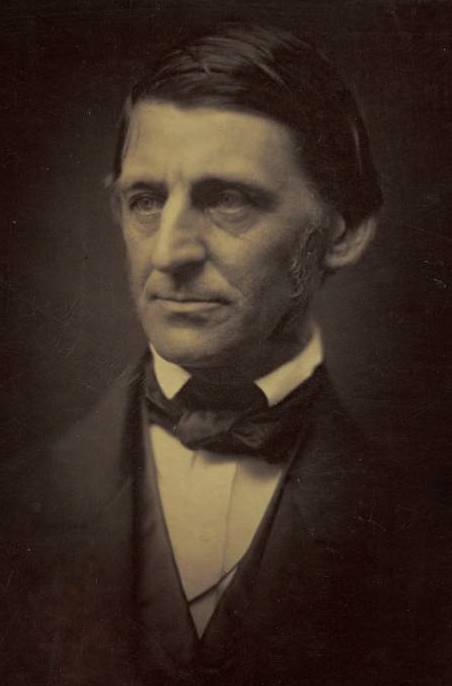
Ralph Waldo Emerson, 1857

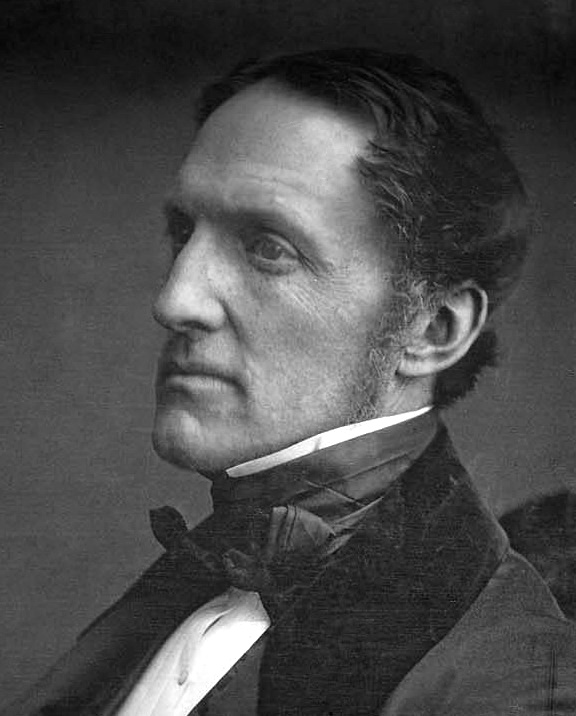
William Hickling Prescott, ca. 1850

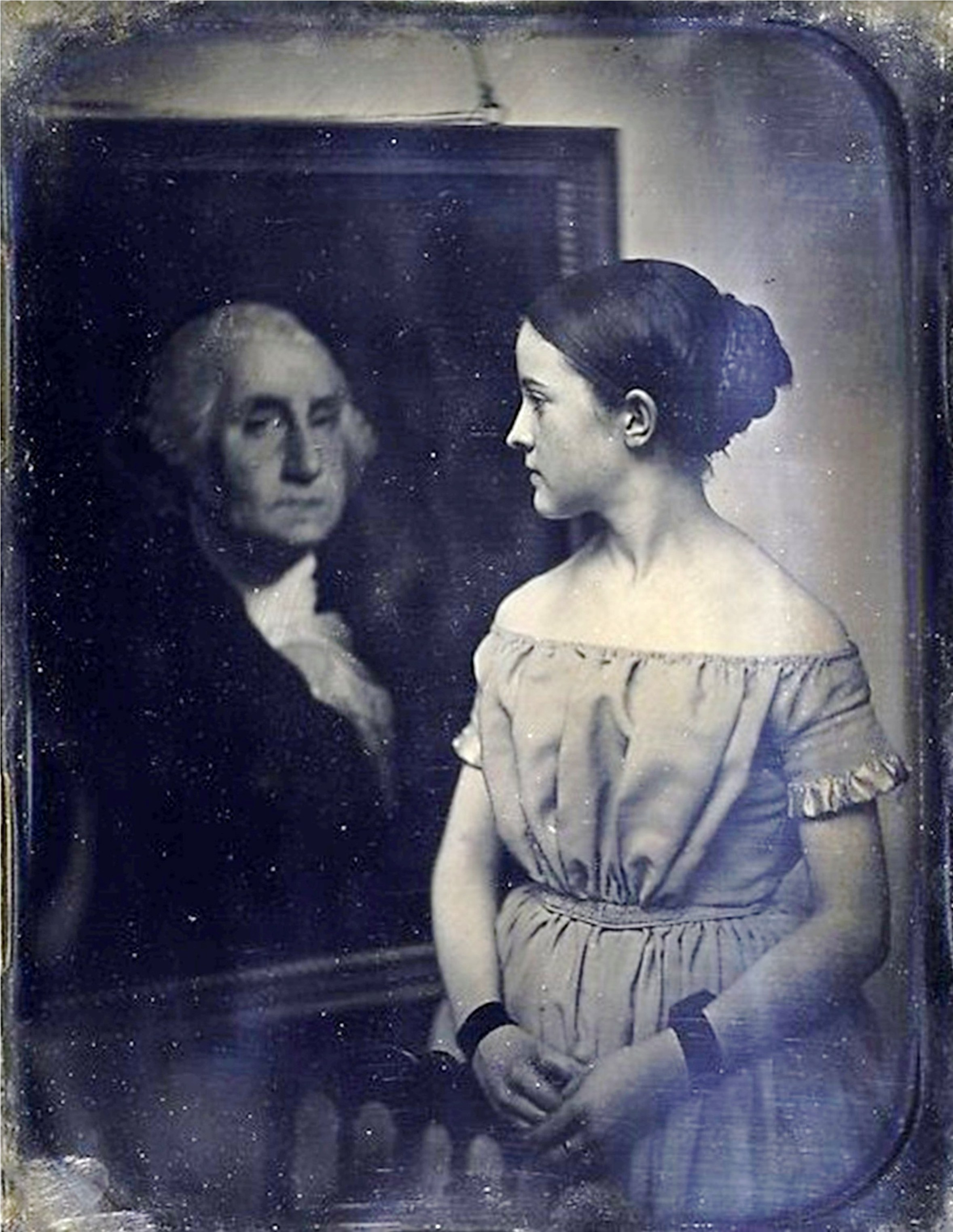
Young girl with portrait of George Washington, ca. 1850

== Portrait subjects ==
- Alvin Adams
- Brooks Adams
- John Quincy Adams
- Marietta Alboni
- Stephen Allen
- Susan B. Anthony
- Nathan Appleton
- William Appleton
- D.C. Bacon
- Ellen B. Bacon
- Nathan Prentiss Banks
- Gaetano Bedini
- Henry Ward Beecher
- Lyman Beecher
- Elise Biscaccianti
- George Sewall Boutwell
- Henry I. Bowdich
- Laura Dewey Bridgman
- George Nixon Briggs
- Louise Winsor Brooks
- Samuel Gilman Brown
- Elizabeth Dwight Cabot
- Edward Tyrrel Channing
- Seth Wells Cheney
- Jonas Chickering
- Francis James Child
- Thomas Childs
- James Freeman Clarke
- Cassius Marcellus Clay
- Henry Clay
- C.W. Couldock
- Henry Clifford Curtis
- Charlotte Cushman
- Henry Dexter
- Dorothea Dix
- John Dixwell
- Mrs. F.N. Drew
- Rufus Ellis
- Ralph Waldo Emerson
- Edward Everett
- Cornelia Conway Felton
- Annie Adams Fields
- James Thomas Fields
- Millard Fillmore
- John Fiske
- Benjamin F. French
- William Frick
- Margaret Fuller
- William Lloyd Garrison
- Mary Gleason
- Otto Goldschmidt
- Charles Goodyear
- Augustus Addison Gould
- Mary Apthorp Quincy Gould
- Simon Greenleaf
- Grace Greenwood
- Matilda Hays
- James Shuttleworth Haywood
- George Peter Alexander Healy
- Oliver Wendell Holmes
- Mary Wood Hooper
- Erastus Hopkins
- Elias Howe
- James Jackson (1777–1867)
- William Jenks
- Gerrit P. Judd
- Kamehameha IV i.e. Prince Lot Kapuiwa (1830–1872)
- Kamehameha V i.e. Prince Alexander Liholiho Iolani (1834–1863)
- Sarah P. Keyes
- Joseph Kimball
- Thomas Starr King
- Edward Norris Kirk
- Louis Kossuth
- Amos Lawrence
- Jenny Lind
- Henry Wadsworth Longfellow
- James Jackson Lowell
- John S. Lurman
- Alice Lyman
- Cornelia F. Malchett
- Theodore Malchett
- Horace Mann
- Donald McKay
- Mary Minot
- Sarah Cabot Minot
- Lola Montez
- Fannie Morey
- Commodore Charles Morris
- Rollin Heber Neale
- Edwards Amasa Park
- Francis Parkman
- John Howard Payne
- Frank Everett Peabody
- George Peabody
- Benjamin Peirce
- Wendell Phillips
- Franklin Pierce
- Mrs. G.W. Pratt
- William Gardner Prescott
- William Hickling Prescott
- Ferencz Pulszky
- Charles Francis Richardson
- Baron James Rothschild
- Truman Henry Safford
- Leverett Saltonstall
- Benjamin Seaver
- Daniel Sharp
- Lemuel Shaw
- A.L. Simpson
- William T. Smithett
- Jared Sparks
- Charles Sprague
- Calvin Ellis Stowe
- Harriet Beecher Stowe
- Charles Sumner
- Caroline Sturgis Tappan
- Zachary Taylor
- George Thompson
- Edward S. Tobey
- Elisabeth Sprague Tobey
- John L. Tucker
- Katherine Parker Tucker
- Ellen Dwight Twisleton
- Bennet Tyler
- Adrian Vandeveer
- Captain Jonathan Walker
- James Lester Wallack
- John Collins Warren
- William Warren
- Daniel Webster
- Benjamin F. White
- Robert Charles Winthrop
- John Ellis Wool
- Jeffries Wyman

== Museums with Southworth & Hawes collections ==
- American Museum of Photography
- Amon Carter Museum of Ft. Worth, Texas
- Boston Athenæum
- Center for Creative Photography, University of Arizona
- George Eastman Museum
- Historic New England
- Metropolitan Museum of Art
- Museum of Fine Arts, Boston
