= Sexual abuse scandal in the Roman Catholic Diocese of Bridgeport =

Scandal involving the Catholic Church in the United States

The sexual abuse scandal in the Roman Catholic Diocese of Bridgeport is a significant episode in the series of Catholic sex abuse cases in the United States. It involves numerous allegations of sexual abuse against priests within the Diocese, with accusations dating back to 1953.

Key events include a series of lawsuits that led to landmark court decisions compelling the release of confidential documents, and a 2019 judicial investigation commissioned by the Diocese. In 2009, decisions by the Supreme Court of Connecticut and the U.S. Supreme Court compelled the Diocese to release thousands of previously sealed legal documents related to the lawsuits.

In 2019, an independent judicial report accused 71 priests of sexually abusing approximately 300 children since 1953. The report also severely criticized the handling of the crisis by the Diocese’s three consecutive bishops over four decades, particularly former Bishop Edward Egan, who was characterized as having a "dismissive, uncaring, and at times threatening attitude toward survivors".

== Supreme Court of Connecticut decision ==
In May 2009, a decision by the Connecticut Supreme Court ordered the release of thousands of legal documents from lawsuits filed against priests accused of sexually abusing children (George L. Rosado et al. v. Bridgeport Roman Catholic Diocesan Corporation et al., (SC 17807).

== Archbishop Egan's legacy ==
In 1993, during Edward Egan's time as Bishop of Bridgeport (1988–2000), 23 lawsuits alleging sexual abuse by priests were filed against the Diocese. Five priests were removed from the ministry during his tenure, and two, Kherian Ahearn and John Castaldo, were convicted on sex abuse charges in 1993 and 2001, respectively. However, many priests credibly accused of abuse during this period died without facing prosecution.

The 23 lawsuits filed during Egan's leadership were settled in 2001, one year after he was appointed Archbishop of New York. In April 2002, Cardinal Egan publicly apologized in a letter read out at Mass, stating, "If in hindsight we also discover that mistakes may have been made as regards prompt removal of priests and assistance to victims, I am deeply sorry". Nearly ten years later, in February 2012, the retired cardinal retracted his apology in an interview with Connecticut magazine, stating, "I never should have said that," and repeatedly denied that any sexual abuse had happened while he was leading the Bridgeport diocese.

== US Supreme Court decision ==
On October 5, 2009, the United States Supreme Court rejected a request by the diocese to stay the Connecticut Supreme Court decision. On Nov. 2, 2009 the United States Supreme Court decided not to grant a writ of certiorari.

== Subsequent Events ==
Bishop William E. Lori has opposed legislation by State Representative Michael P. Lawlor and State Senator Andrew J. McDonald that would remove control of the diocese from the bishop and place it into the hands of laymen. The legislation had been written with the help of liberal Catholics, including Connecticut attorney Thomas Gallagher, a contributor to the group Voice of the Faithful.

== November 2009 hearings ==
The Connecticut Superior Court held hearings in November 2009 on procedures and privacy safeguards. The court ordered that the documents be released on Dec. 1, 2009, in CD form, to be given to the four newspapers—the Hartford Courant, the New York Times, Boston Globe and Washington Post—that had originally filed the lawsuit seeking to force the diocese to open the records to public inspection. The diocese has provided background and a statement on the suit and its status.

== October 2019 judicial report ==
In October 2019, former Connecticut Superior Court Judge Robert Holzberg released the results of his investigation, commissioned by Bridgeport Bishop Frank Caggiano, into the Diocese's handling of accusations of sexual abuse by its priests. Holzberg found that all three of Bridgeport's bishops over forty years had consistently failed to fulfill their moral and legal responsibilities. Holzberg found that Egan took a "dismissive, uncaring, and at times threatening attitude toward survivors"; he characterized the bishop's behavior as "profoundly unsympathetic, inadequate, and inflammatory". Holzberg's report, which stemmed from a year-long investigation, accused 71 priests of sexually abusing 300 children since 1953. However, it also praised the reforms which were made by Egan's successors William Lori and Frank Caggiano to combat sex abuse and compared their tenure to that of their predecessors as "a tale of two cities."

== Case of Jaime Marin-Cardona ==
In March 2020, it was announced that the pre-trial hearing for accused Danbury priest Jaime Marin-Cardona would begin March 27, 2020 and conclude April 21, 2020. Marin-Cardona was officially charged with three counts of fourth-degree sexual assault, three counts of risk of injury to child and three counts of illegal sexual contact. He was arrested on January 3, 2020, and released on bond four weeks later after agreeing to wear a tracking device and comply with protective orders. He has pled not guilty to all nine charges.

== See also ==
- Charter for the Protection of Children and Young People
- National Review Board
- Pontifical Commission for the Protection of Minors
