= Auguste-Rosalie Bisson =

French photographer

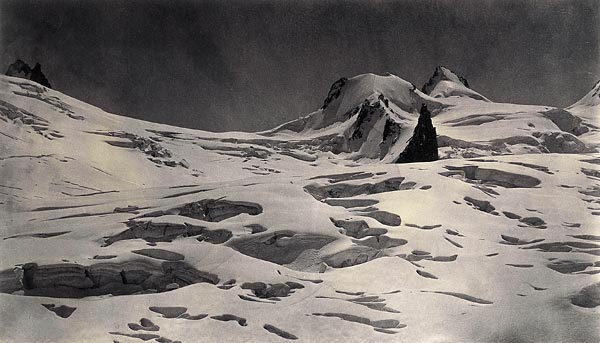
Col du Géant

Auguste-Rosalie Bisson (1 May 1826 – 22 April 1900) was a French photographer, active from 1841 to the year of his death, 1900. He was born and died in Paris and was the son of the heraldic painter, Louis-François Bisson and the brother of Louis-Auguste Bisson.

He was the first person to take pictures from the summit of Mont Blanc, in the summer of 1861. While making this expedition, he took 25 porters to carry his equipment.

== Bibliography ==
- Anglo-American Name Authority File, s.v. "Bisson, Auguste-Rosalie", LC Control Number no 99059153, cited 7 February 2006
- Union List of Artists Names, s.v. "Bisson, Auguste-Rosalie", cited 7 February 2006

== See also ==
- Media related to Auguste-Rosalie Bisson at Wikimedia Commons
