= Lucienne Bisson =

French artist (1880–1939)

- Born: 6 July 1880
- Died: 14 August 1939 (aged 59)
- Known for: Painting
- Family: Frédérique Vallet-Bisson (mother) Pierre-Auguste Renoir (biological father)

Lucienne Bisson (6 July 1880 – 14 August 1939) was a French artist.

Bisson was born in Paris. She was the illegitimate daughter of French painter and sculptor Pierre-Auguste Renoir (1841 – 1919) and Frédérique Vallet-Bisson (1862 – 1948), also a French painter who was leading the Société Féminine des Artistes. (Note: Frédérique Vallet-Bisson (1862 - 1948) studied with Jules Lefebvre. She exhibited Two Roses at the 1893 Columbian World Exposition and in 1914 received the Chevalier de la Légion d'Honneur as a successful painter. Lucienne may have been born in 1884.)

Lucienne Bisson exhibited her works in many French Salons, among them the Salon des Indépendants. She is famous for her Paris city views, beautiful landscapes and colorful still lifes. For instance, a Bisson painting captured the "heavy atmosphere" on a cloudy Paris street in 1920s.

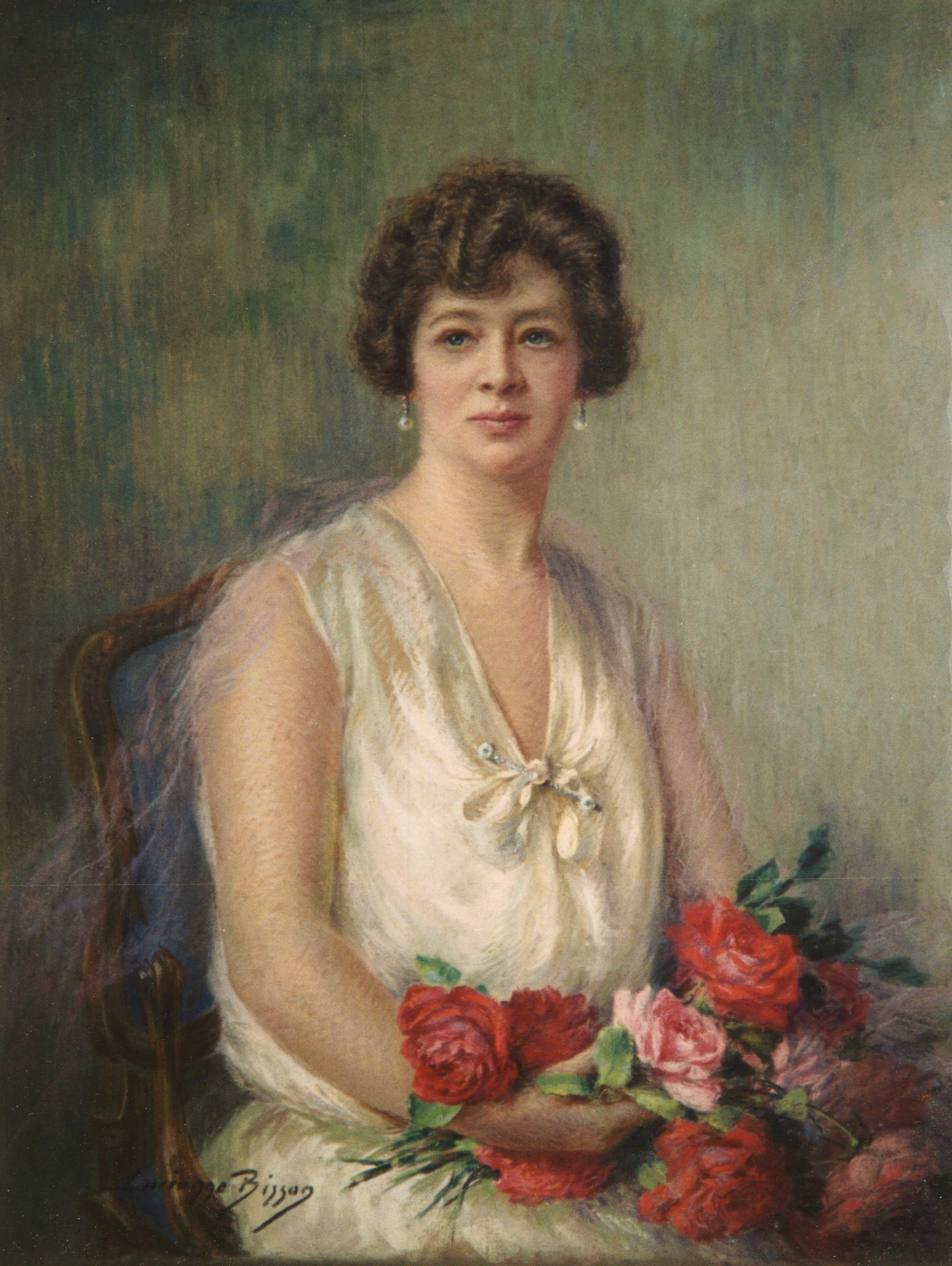
Lucienne Bisson, Madame Griffon, pastel, c. 1930

She died in August 1939, roughly one year before Nazi Germany occupied France during World War II. Her mother outlived Lucienne by 9 years, dying in 1948.
