= Matt Bissonnette =

Matt Bissonnette may refer to:

- Matt Bissonette (musician) (born 1961), American bass player and vocalist
- Matt Bissonnette (author) (born 1976), former United States Navy SEAL and author of No Easy Day
- Matt Bissonnette (director) (fl. 2002), Canadian film director and writer
