= Louis Bisson =

Canadian aviator

Louis Bisson, CM, OBE was a Canadian aviator. He was born in 1909 in Hull, Quebec (now Gatineau, Quebec). He died on 19 September 1997.

He flew for the Royal Air Force Ferry Command during World War II.

Louis Bisson received the King's Commendation for Valuable Service in the Air on 11 June 1942. He was appointed an Officer of the Order of the British Empire on 1 January 1944. He was appointed a Member of the Order of Canada on 23 June 1980. He was inducted into the Québec Air and Space Hall of Fame on 21 October 2002.

The Louis Bisson Bridge over the Rivière des Prairies is named after him.
