= Baillon =

Baillon is a surname of French origin. Notable people with the surname include:

- Henri Ernest Baillon (1827–1895), French physician and botanist
- Louis Antoine François Baillon (1778–1851), French naturalist and collector
- Louis Charles Baillon (1881–1965), Falkland Islands field-hockey player
- Susan Janet Baillon (1957), a.k.a. Siouxsie Sioux, British singer-songwriter
