= Pierre-André Bissonnette =

Canadian diplomat (died 1989)

Pierre-André Bissonnette (died 23 December 1989) was a Canadian diplomat. He was concurrently appointed as Acting High Commissioner to Malaya and Malaysia and Chargé d'Affaires a.i. to Myanmar.

Bissonnette also served as chairman of the International Joint Commission.

In 1989 Bissonnette was appointed an Officer of the Order of Canada. He died from cancer two days later.

Diplomatic posts
Preceded by Arthur Redpath Menzies	Acting High Commissioner to Malaya; 1961-1962	Succeeded by Charles Eustace McGaughey
Preceded by Arthur Redpath Menzies	Acting High Commissioner to Malaysia; 1961-1962	Succeeded by Charles Eustace McGaughey
Preceded by Arthur Redpath Menzies	Chargé d'Affaires a.i. to Myanmar; 1961-1962	Succeeded by Charles Eustace McGaughey
