= Alfred Pike Bissonnet =

Canadian diplomat (1914–1979)

Alfred Pike (“Ted”) Bissonnet (1914–1979) was a Canadian diplomat. He was born in Stanstead, Quebec, the son of Alfred Joseph Bissonnet, an industrialist and Member of the Québec National Assembly from Stanstead, and Josephine Pike of neighbouring Derby Line, Vermont, and studied at Stanstead College and Bishop's University. Bissonnet joined the Black Watch regiment and served overseas in the UK, Belgium and the Netherlands during World War II. He was wounded in the Netherlands and during his recovery in the UK applied to and later joined the Department of Trade and Commerce in 1946 following the end of the war.

As a Trade Commissioner he served in Athens, Rome, Karachi, Stockholm and Tokyo, before returning to Ottawa in 1963, where he was subsequently appointed Director of the Trade Commissioner Service.

In 1968 he transferred to the Department of External Affairs where he was appointed as Ambassador Extraordinary and Plenipotentiary to Indonesia in 1968, and then in 1970-78 concurrently as Ambassador Extraordinary and Plenipotentiary to Argentina, Paraguay and Uruguay.

In Rome in 1949 he met and married Marcella Despujols, daughter of the French artist Jean Despujols and granddaughter of Admiral it: Lamberto Vannutelli. They had three children, Maria-Luisa (1949–51), Richard (1953-) and Catherine (1957-).

Diplomatic posts
Preceded by William George Marcel Olivier	Ambassador Extraordinary and Plenipotentiary to Indonesia; 1968-1970	Succeeded by William Thomas Delworth
Preceded by Robert Choquette	Ambassador Extraordinary and Plenipotentiary to Paraguay; 1970-1978	Succeeded by Dwight Wilder Fulford
Preceded by Sidney Allan Freifeld	Ambassador Extraordinary and Plenipotentiary to Uruguay; 1970-1978	Succeeded by Dwight Wilder Fulford
Preceded by Robert Choquette	Ambassador Extraordinary and Plenipotentiary Argentina; 1970-1978	Succeeded by Dwight Wilder Fulford
