= Frédérique Vallet-Bisson =

French painter

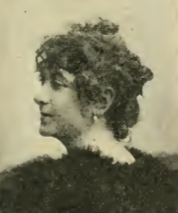
- Born: 29 April 1862; Amiens
- Died: 1949 (aged 86–87)

Frédérique Vallet-Bisson (29 April 1862 – 1949) was a French painter and pastellist.

Vallet-Bisson was born in Amiens but moved to Paris, where she became a pupil of Jules-Joseph Lefebvre at the Académie Julian. She showed works at the Paris Salon from 1890 to 1945, and won several awards. She exhibited at Chicago World Exposition in 1893. Vallet-Bisson had a daughter born in 1880, Lucienne Bisson, who was also a painter.

Vallet-Bisson's painting The Departure was included in the 1905 book Women Painters of the World and was described in an issue of the Magasin Pittoresque.

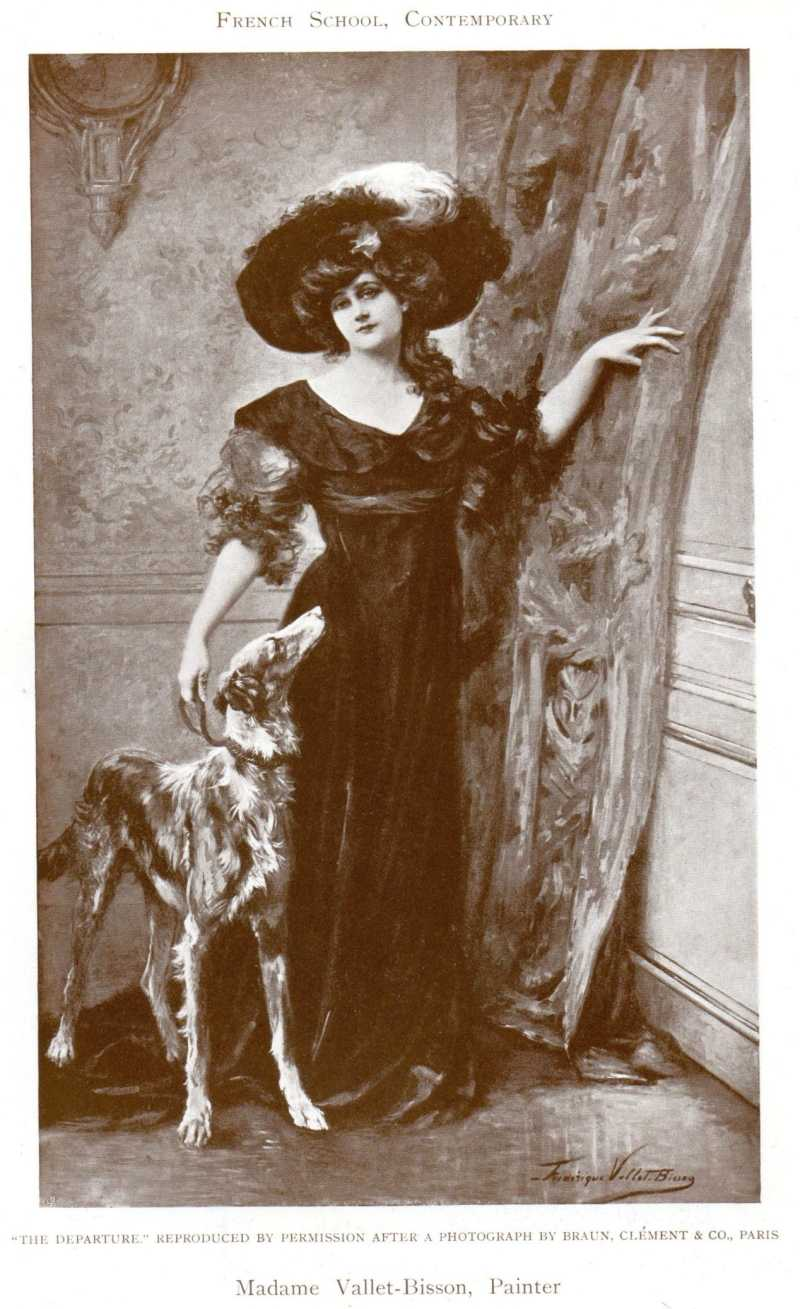
The Departure
