= Louis-Auguste Bisson =

French photographer

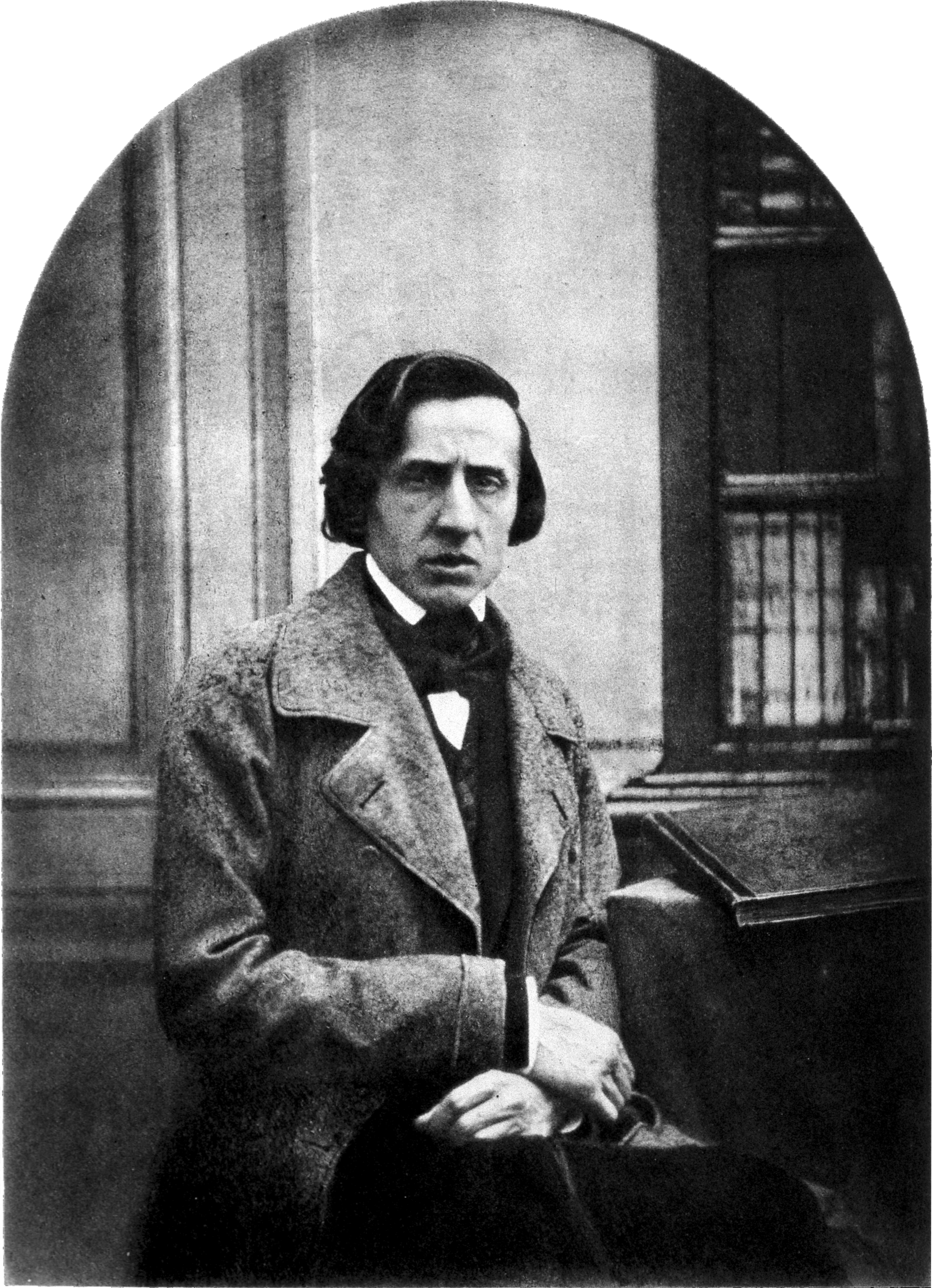
One of the two known photographs of Frédéric Chopin, taken by Louis-Auguste Bisson in 1849

Louis-Auguste Bisson (French: [lwi oɡyst bisɔ̃]; 1814–1876) was a 19th-century French photographer.

Bisson opened a photographic studio in early 1841. Soon after, his brother Auguste-Rosalie Bisson (1826–1900) entered into partnership with him. Their studio was in the La Madeleine in Paris, and they became famous as the Bisson Brothers.

In 1860 they accompanied Napoleon III on his visit to Savoy. The pair produced remarkable images of the local scenery. Having received an encouraging response to his work, the following year Auguste ascended Mont Blanc, taking with him twenty-five porters to carry his equipment.

The photographs were made using the collodion process, with very large negatives, often up to 30 cm x 40 cm (12" x 16")

The brothers refused to reduce their images to the carte de visite size and, consequently, after four years, they ceased operating their business.

One of the most famous works attributed to this artist is his photograph of composer Frédéric Chopin. The origin of the portrait has never been adequately explained and, subsequently, the image was excluded from the 'Les frères Bisson Photographes' exhibition at the Bibliothèque Nationale in 1999.

== See also ==
- Media related to Louis-Auguste Bisson at Wikimedia Commons
