= Chris Bisaillon =

American football player (born 1971)

Profile
- Position: Wide receiver

Personal information
- Born: November 20, 1971 (age 54); Kankakee, Illinois

Career information
- College: Illinois Wesleyan
- College Football Hall of Fame

Chris Bisaillon is a retired American football player who played for the Illinois Wesleyan Titans as a wide receiver. In 2012, he was inducted into the College Football Hall of Fame. Bisaillon, who played for the Titans from 1989 to 1992, becomes only the second IWU player to be named to the College Football Hall of Fame, joining lineman Tony Blazine, who played at IWU from 1931 to 1934 and was inducted posthumously in 2002. The two-time All-America honoree left the school as the most accomplished wide receiver in Division III history as he set the all-time NCAA record with 55 touchdown catches, and tied the Division III record by recording 36 consecutive games with a reception. Bisaillon's 55 scoring grabs topped the record set by Jerry Rice of Mississippi Valley State. He finished his IWU career with 230 receptions for 3,125 yards. He also had 1,067 kickoff return yards and 981 punt return yards. The Division III and collegiate record has since been set at 75 career receiving TDs by Scott Pingel of Westminster (Mo.) from 1996 to 1999.
