= Samuel-De Champlain Bridge =

Bridge in Quebec

Samuel-De Champlain Bridge Pont Samuel-De Champlain (French)
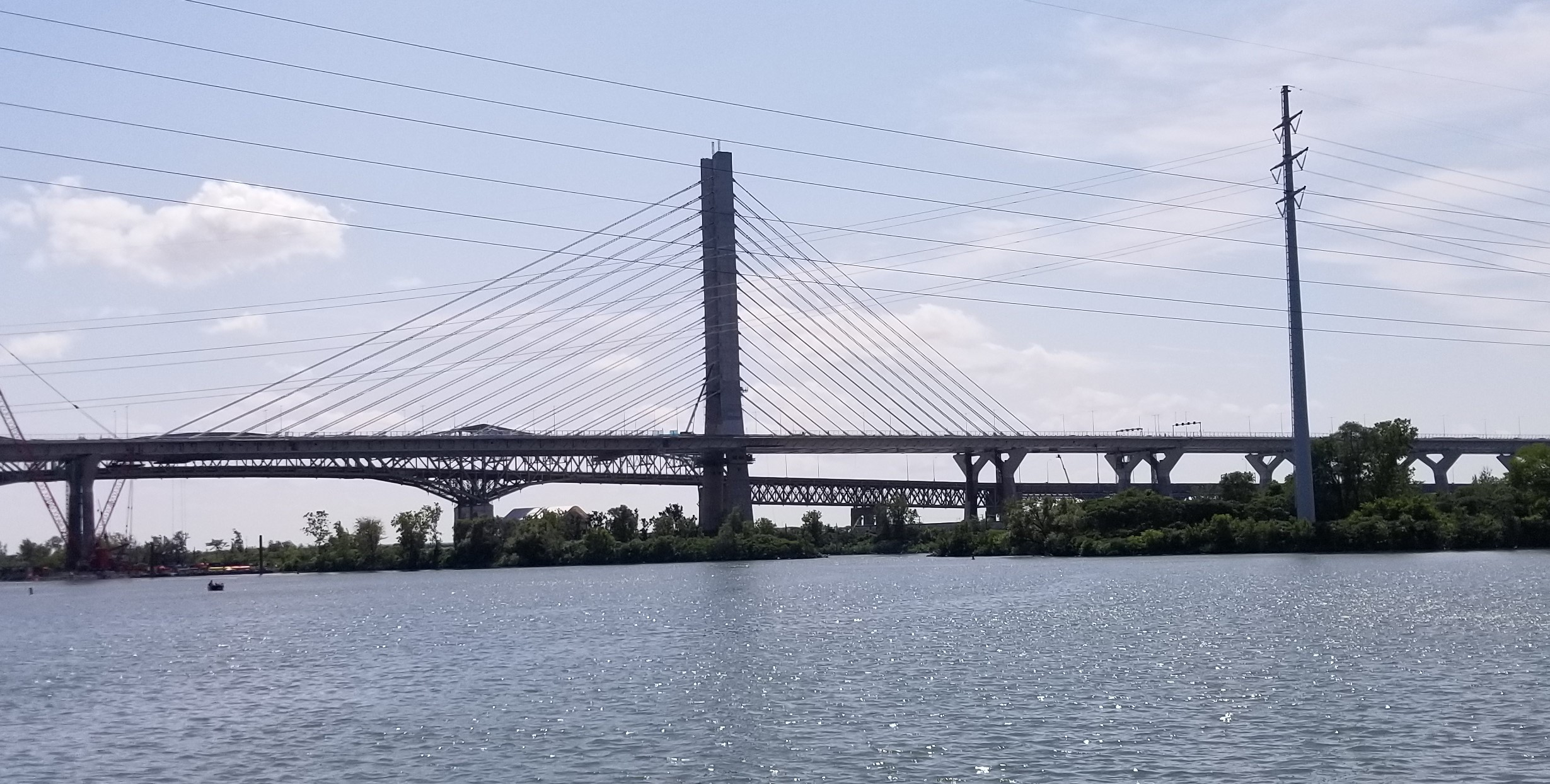
- Samuel-De Champlain Bridge as viewed from Brossard in July 2019
- Coordinates: 45°28′10″N 73°30′58″W
- Carries: 8 lanes (4 northwestbound, 4 southeastbound) of A-10 / A-15 / A-20; 2 tracks used by the REM
- Crosses: St. Lawrence River and Saint Lawrence Seaway
- Locale: Brossard and Montreal, Quebec, Canada
- Owner: The Jacques Cartier and Champlain Bridges Inc.
- Maintained by: The Jacques Cartier and Champlain Bridges Inc.
- Website: www.newchamplain.ca

Characteristics
- Design: Cable-stayed bridge
- Material: Steel, Concrete
- Total length: 3,480 m (11,417 ft)
- Width: 60 m (196.85 ft)
- Height: 170 m (557.74 ft)
- Longest span: 240 m (787.40 ft)
- Clearance below: 38.5 metres (126 ft)
- Design life: 125 years

History
- Architect: Poul Ove Jensen
- Designer: T.Y. Lin International
- Constructed by: SNC-Lavalin, ACS Group, Dragados Canada
- Construction start: 2015
- Construction end: 2019
- Construction cost: $4.2 billion
- Opened: June 24, 2019 (northbound/westbound span); July 1, 2019 (southbound/eastbound span)
- Inaugurated: June 28, 2019; 7 years ago
- Replaces: Champlain Bridge, Montreal (1962–2019)

Statistics
- Daily traffic: 159,000

Location
- Location on a map of Montreal

The Samuel-De Champlain Bridge, colloquially known as the Champlain Bridge, is a cable-stayed bridge designed by architect Poul Ove Jensen and built to replace the original Champlain Bridge over the Saint Lawrence River in Quebec, between Nuns' Island in the borough of Verdun in Montreal and the suburban city of Brossard on the South Shore. A second, connected bridge links Nuns' Island to the main Island of Montreal. It is the second busiest bridge in Canada, behind only the Port Mann Bridge in Vancouver, carrying approximately 137,000 vehicles/day annually.

The new span is located just north of the location of the original Champlain Bridge, demolition of which began as soon as the new bridge was completed. The new bridge carries eight lanes of automobile traffic of the A-10, A-15, and A-20, with one lane in each direction dedicated for buses. It also includes a multi-use lane for cyclists and pedestrians. The central portion of the bridge deck carries the South Shore branch of the Réseau express métropolitain (REM) automated light metro system. At 60 metres (200 ft) wide, the new Bridge is the widest cable-stayed bridge in the world that uses two planes of cables and one of the widest bridges of any type in the world.

It is one of the largest infrastructure projects ever built in North America and with an estimated 59 million vehicles a year, one of the busiest crossings on the continent. It is built to last 125 years with the usage of stainless steel and high-performance concrete, and replaces the previous 57-year-old bridge, which had become functionally obsolete, as well as its structure having been degraded by the repeated application of de-icing salt.

== Specifications ==
View of the northbound traffic deck from the bicycle pathway, July 2025

The Champlain bridge is a 3.48-kilometre (2.16 mi) crossing. It includes an asymmetric cable-stayed bridge with a 240-metre (790 ft) main span, a 168-metre-high (551 ft) concrete tower, and stay cables in a harp arrangement. The asymmetrical back span is 124 metres (407 ft). The 2,044-metre (6,706 ft) west approach structure has 26 spans that are typically 80.4 metres (264 ft). The east approach is 780 metres (2,560 ft) long and includes a 109-metre (358 ft) span over Route 132.

The bridge was built as part of a larger $4 billion project that included:

- The Samuel-de-Champlain Bridge
- A new Autoroute 10 (A-10) approach
- A new 470-metre (1,540 ft) île-des-Sœurs bridge and a highway on île-des-Soeurs
- Improvements to nearby parts of the A-15

The design of the Champlain Bridge addressed seismic activity, soil liquefaction, light-rail transit loading, ship collision, and ice loading. The bridge is configured with three separate decks, one for each direction of vehicular traffic and a third in the centre for the Réseau express métropolitain rail corridor. The northbound deck is wider to include a multi-use corridor for cyclists and pedestrians, requiring the cable-stay bridge to be asymmetric in the transverse direction as well as longitudinal. The main tower is shaped like a tuning fork and is supported by twenty-one 1.2-metre (3.9 ft) drilled piles. The decks are supported in the approach spans by W-shaped piers.

== Construction history ==
In September 2007, faced with rising costs for the maintenance of the Champlain Bridge (commissioned in 1962), then Canadian Minister of Transport Lawrence Cannon confirmed that his department was seriously considering the construction of a replacement structure. In August 2008, Transport Canada announced that it was exploring different scenarios for a new bridge. In October 2011, then Minister of Transport Denis Lebel officially announced that construction on the new bridge would begin within 10 years.

In November 2014, then Minister of Transport Lisa Raitt announced that she was abandoning the idea of naming the new bridge in honour of Maurice Richard after consulting the family of the former ice hockey champion. Prior to the 2015 Canadian federal election, the 28th Canadian Ministry planned on imposing a $2-$4 toll on the new bridge, however, this plan was abandoned following the election of the 29th Canadian Ministry.

In April 2015, the federal government selected the JV consortium: Signature on the St. Lawrence Group to build the new bridge. The consortium mainly includes: SNC-Lavalin, the Spanish ACS Infrastructure, and Dragados Canada. T.Y. Lin International is serving as the Lead Designer.

Construction on the new bridge officially began on June 16, 2015. On December 19, 2018, Minister of Infrastructure and Communities François-Philippe Champagne announced that the official name of the new bridge will be the Samuel-de-Champlain Bridge, after French explorer Samuel de Champlain. The bridge opened to northbound/westbound traffic on June 24, 2019 (St-Jean-Baptiste Day), with the official opening ceremony being held on June 28, 2019, and southbound/eastbound traffic opening on July 1, 2019 (Canada Day). The multi-purpose runway was opened in November 2019 followed by the REM train tracks on July 31, 2023.

== Construction method ==
In order to meet the 42-month construction deadline, many steel and concrete bridge elements were prefabricated, with a portion of the work taking place on temporary piers. Three jetties were built: one on the east from Brossard, one on the west from Nuns' Island, and one from the centre, adjacent to a dike along the Saint Lawrence Seaway.

- The pier through the canal, allowed, by means of cofferdams, the storage of piles of construction material.
- The central jetty served as a construction platform for the piers and towers of the section of the bridge utilizing guy-wires. Temporary pillars used during the construction of the Millau Viaduct in France were erected to support the cable-stayed span during construction. The main cable-stayed span above the seaway was assembled in segments by means of a crane.
- The 500 metre (yard) long west pier was divided into three pre-assembly areas: a first for the concrete foundation footings that serve as the base for the viaduct section crossing the river, a second for the steel headers that complete the piles, and a third for the steel superstructures that wear the aprons. During the prefabrication of the 38 marine insoles, a pile primer and working platform were added to form a pile base measuring up to 14 metres (46 ft) high. A super-transporter moved these stack bases from the prefabrication area to a loading area from where they were lifted by an industrial catamaran. The catamaran then deposited these bases in spaces drilled to a depth of 4 to 5 metres (13 to 16 ft) into the riverbed. Two floating cranes finally overlaid the bases of the prefabricated elements to form piles and headers. The steel box girders supporting the three decks of the bridge were then deposited on the trimmers as they were completed.

Samuel-De Champlain Bridge illuminated at night, viewed from Brossard, Montérégie in March 2023, with the final remnants of the preceding truss-cantilever Champlain Bridge being dismantled at the foreground

== Gallery ==
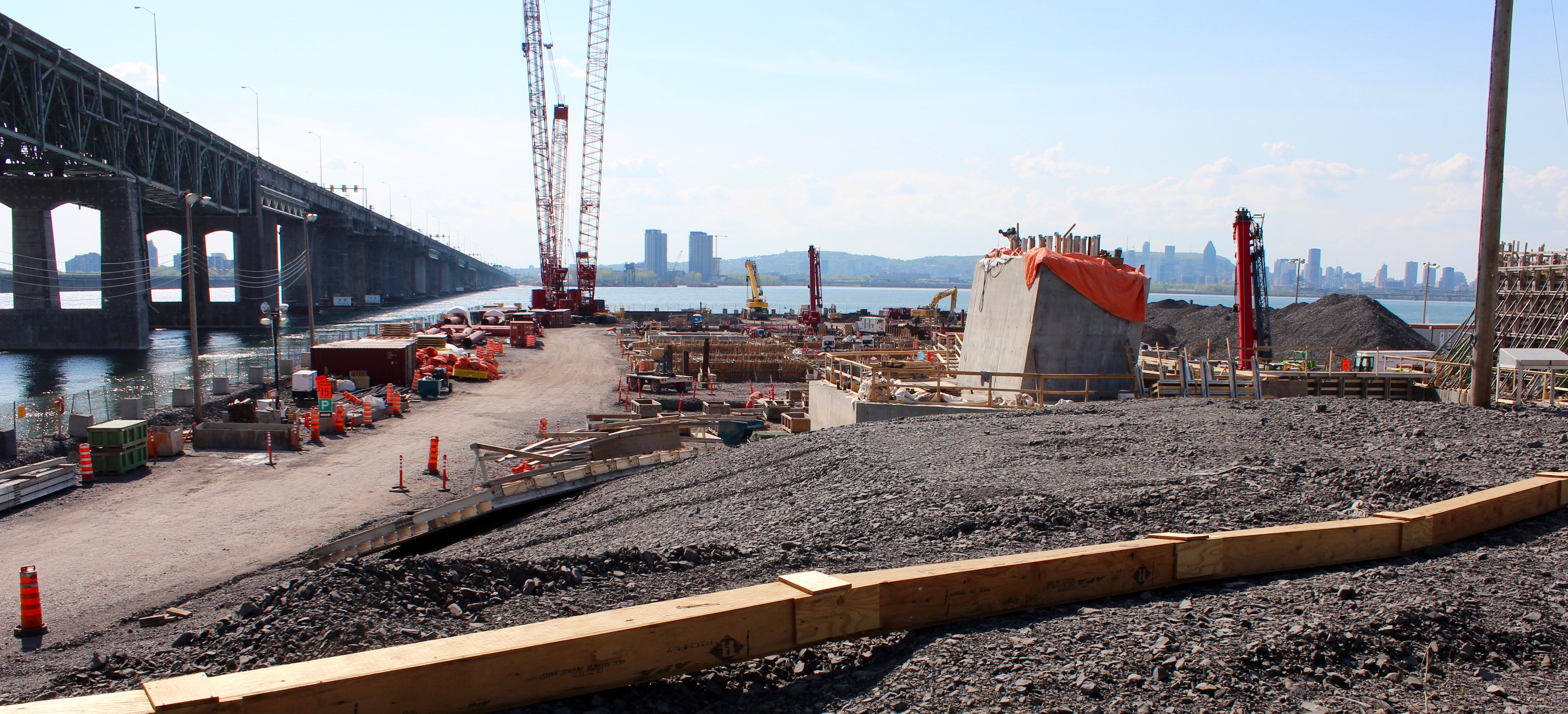
The foot of the replacement Champlain Bridge's central tower, May 2016

Construction of the replacement Champlain Bridge, as seen from Île des Sœurs, Montréal, August 2017

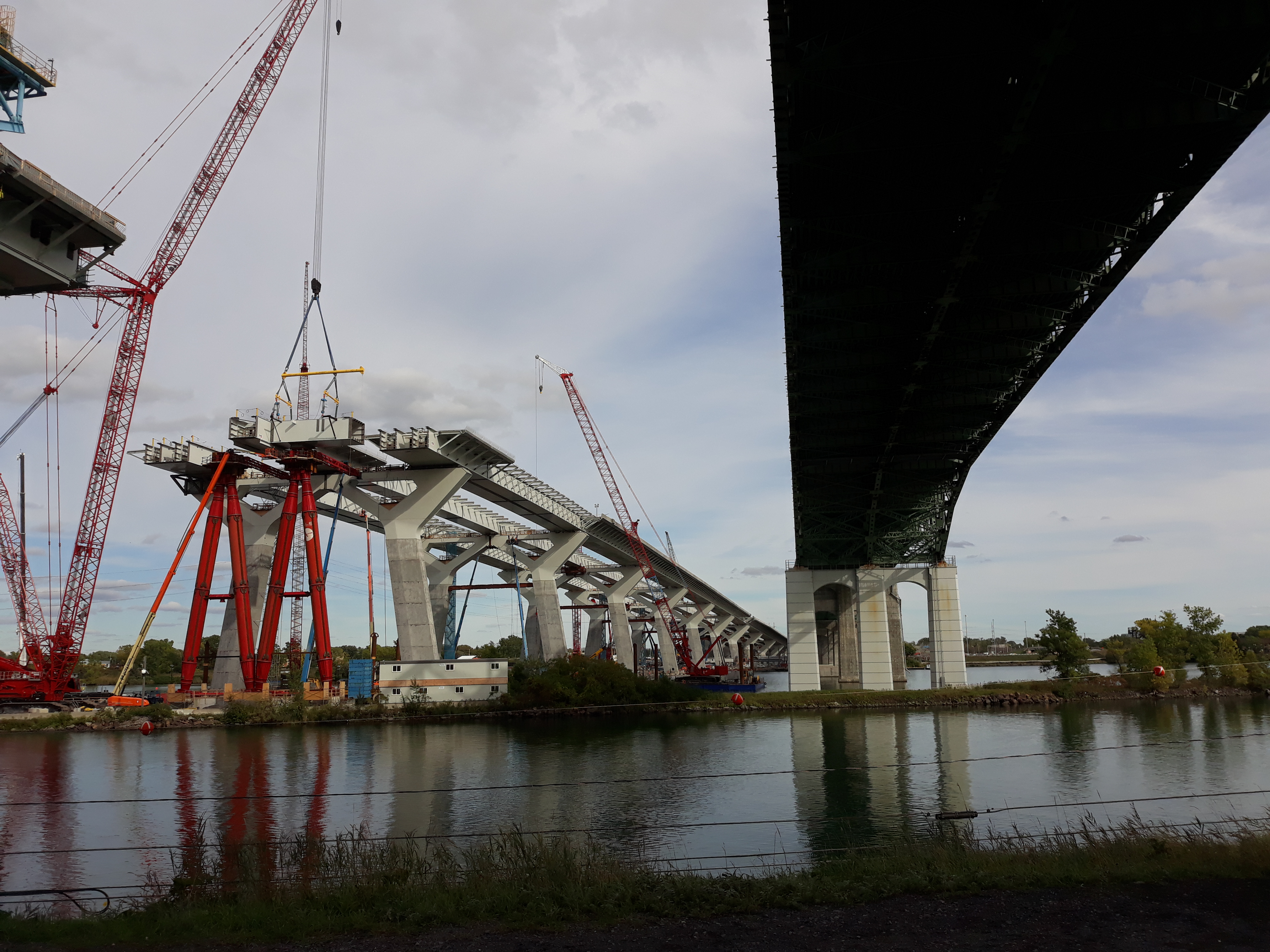
Approach deck construction, September 2018

W-shaped piers underneath the eastern approach of the Samuel-De Champlain Bridge.

View of the decks of the Samuel-De Champlain Bridge, November 2023, showing the rail tracks used by REM, and automobile road decks carrying A-10.

== See also ==
- List of crossings of the Saint Lawrence River
- List of bridges in Canada
- List of bridges in Montreal
