= Suzanne King (researcher) =

Canadian psychiatric researcher

- Known for: Project Ice Storm; research on prenatal stress

Academic background
- Education: McGill University (BA); James Madison University (MEd, EdS); Virginia Polytechnic Institute (PhD)
- Theses: Modeling the Career Maturity of Hearing and Hearing-Impaired Adolescents (1988)

Academic work
- Discipline: Psychiatry
- Sub-discipline: Developmental psychology
- Institutions: McGill University; Douglas Mental Health University Institute

Suzanne King is a Canadian researcher in psychiatry and developmental psychopathology. She is professor emerita in the Department of Psychiatry at McGill University and a researcher at the Douglas Mental Health University Institute in Montreal. She is best known for founding Project Ice Storm, a long-term study of children who were exposed in utero to the January 1998 North American ice storm, and for related studies of prenatal stress following floods, wildfires, and the COVID-19 pandemic.

== Early life and education ==
King earned a Bachelor of Arts in psychology from McGill University in 1979. She then moved to the United States, where she earned a Master of Education (1980) and an Education Specialist degree (1982) in school psychology from James Madison University in Virginia; her Ed.S. thesis examined the use of the SIT, CAT and CTBS as screening instruments for gifted children. She completed a PhD in educational research and vocational school psychology at Virginia Polytechnic Institute in 1988, with a dissertation titled Modeling the Career Maturity of Hearing and Hearing-Impaired Adolescents. From 1988 to 1991 she carried out postdoctoral research at McGill University and the Douglas Hospital Research Centre, supervised by anthropologist Ellen Corin.

=== Academic career ===
King joined the McGill Department of Psychiatry as an assistant professor in September 1991. She was promoted to associate professor in 1998 and to full professor in 2014, and held associate memberships in McGill's Department of Psychology, McGill's Faculty of Education, and the Department of Psychology at the Université de Montréal. She retired on December 31, 2022, and was granted the title of professor emerita. According to Google Scholar, her work has been cited more than 15,000 times. She has been a research scientist in the Psychosocial Research Division of the Douglas Hospital Research Centre since 1991. In 2019 she became one of four co-principal investigators of the Réseau Inondation Inter-Sectoriel du Québec (RIISQ), a Quebec-wide network studying flood risk and response. Her early research examined expressed emotion in the families of people with schizophrenia. In a longitudinal study of young adults with schizophrenia and their mothers, she found that patients' symptom severity predicted mothers' subsequent criticism and emotional overinvolvement, suggesting that relatives' expressed emotion was more often an effect of patients' symptoms than a cause.

== Research ==
=== Project Ice Storm ===
The January 1998 ice storm cut electricity to more than three million people across Quebec, in some areas for over a month, in the middle of winter. King's own family went without power for a week, and her blood pressure stayed elevated afterward; the experience led her to see the storm as a natural experiment for studying prenatal maternal stress, since exposure varied by household rather than by choice. She began recruiting pregnant women that June, and their children have been followed ever since, from infancy into adulthood. The study's central finding has held up across many papers: mothers who went longer without electricity had children with lower IQ and language scores at age 5½, and the size of the effect tracked the length of the outage rather than how distressed the mother said she felt. Subsequent papers extended the cohort's story: autistic-like traits and, among girls, asthma symptoms have both been linked to prenatal exposure, with the effects shifting depending on when in pregnancy the mother was exposed. A 2015 paper went further still, tying mothers' cognitive appraisal of the disaster to DNA methylation patterns detectable in their children 13 years on. By the storm's twentieth anniversary in 2018, roughly a hundred of the children by then young adults were still taking part.

=== Other studies ===
In 2008 she turned to Iowa, where severe flooding gave her a chance to study women who, in a stroke of luck for the research, were already enrolled in an unrelated pregnancy study when the floods hit. Three years later, the 2011 Queensland floods gave rise to QF2011, a collaboration with researchers in Australia that went further than earlier projects by collecting biological samples, including placentas, at birth.

The 2016 Fort McMurray wildfire prompted the Mommy Baby Study, which followed women who were pregnant or trying to conceive at the time and also tested whether an online expressive-writing exercise could ease their stress. A similar writing intervention was tested the following year among roughly 1,000 women who had been pregnant during the flooding that followed Hurricane Harvey in Houston.

When the COVID-19 pandemic began, King turned the same approach on it, joining as a co-investigator on Canadian and Australian studies of prenatal stress during the pandemic, including the CONCEPTION Study and the Australian BITTOC Study. She has drawn on lessons from the earlier disaster cohorts to think through what pandemic-related stress might mean for pregnant women and their children.

== Awards ==
King held an FRSQ chercheur-boursier award, at the Junior 1, Junior 2 and Senior levels, from 1991 to 2003, and was a Distinguished Visiting Research Fellow at the Australian Catholic University in Brisbane in 2012.

== Media coverage ==
Journalists have returned to King's research periodically, particularly around anniversaries of the 1998 storm; CBC News and Global News have both covered the project more than once. The work also reached wider audiences through the 2015 BBC documentary series Countdown to Life and through a chapter in Annie Murphy Paul's 2010 book on fetal origins research, Origins.

== Selected publications ==
- King, S.; Laplante, D.P. (2005). "The Effects of Prenatal Maternal Stress on Children's Cognitive Development: Project Ice Storm". Stress. 8 (1): 35–45. doi:10.1080/10253890500108391. PMID 16019596.
- Laplante, D.P.; Brunet, A.; Schmitz, N.; Ciampi, A.; King, S. (2008). "Project Ice Storm: Prenatal Maternal Stress Affects Cognitive and Linguistic Functioning in 5½ Year-Old Children". Journal of the American Academy of Child and Adolescent Psychiatry. 47 (9): 1063–1072. doi:10.1097/CHI.0b013e31817eec80. PMID 18665002.
- King, S.; Dancause, K.N.; Turcotte-Tremblay, A.-M.; Veru, F.; Laplante, D.P. (2012). "Using Natural Disasters to Study the Effects of Prenatal Maternal Stress on Child Health and Development". Birth Defects Research Part C. 96 (4): 273–288. doi:10.1002/bdrc.21026. PMID 24203917.
- Cao-Lei, L.; Elgbeili, G.; Massart, R.; Laplante, D.P.; Szyf, M.; King, S. (2015). "Pregnant women's cognitive appraisal from a natural disaster affects DNA methylation in their children 13 years later: Project Ice Storm". Translational Psychiatry. 5 (2): e515. doi:10.1038/tp.2015.13. PMC 4445750. PMID 25710121.
- King, S.; Kildea, S.; Austin, M.-P.; et al. (2015). "QF2011: A protocol to study the effects of the Queensland flood on pregnant women, their pregnancies, and their children's early development". BMC Pregnancy and Childbirth. 15 109. doi:10.1186/s12884-015-0539-7. PMC 4518637. PMID 25943435.
