= Verdun, Quebec =

Coordinates: 45°27′N 73°34′W

Verdun
- Borough of Montreal
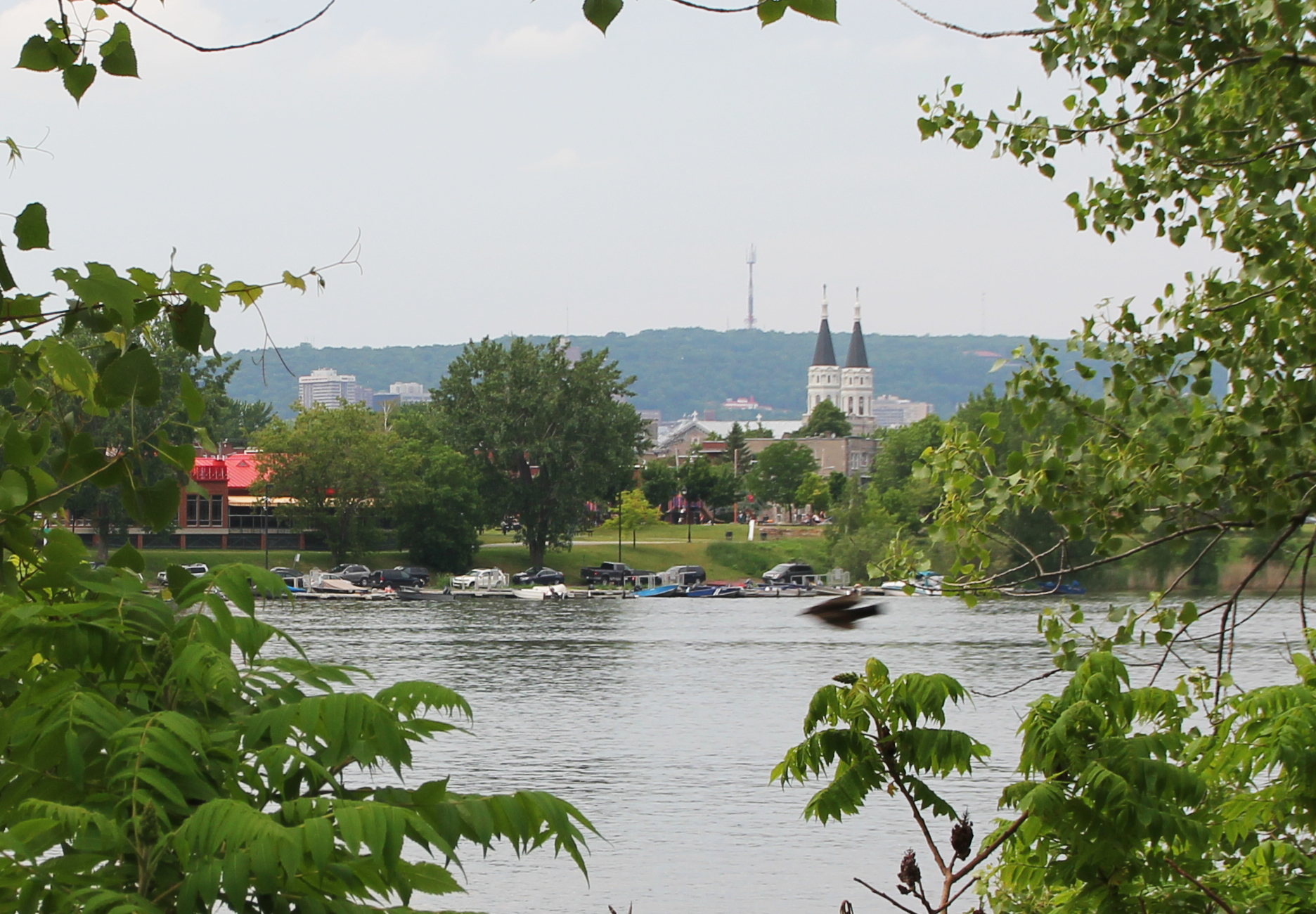
- Verdun seen from Nuns' Island

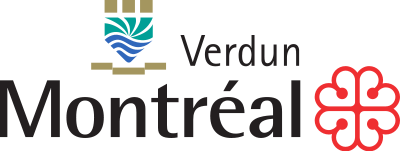

- Location (in red) of Verdun on the Island of Montreal. (Grey areas indicate demerged municipalities).
- Country: Canada
- Province: Quebec
- City: Montreal
- Region: Montréal
- Merger into Montreal: January 1, 2002
- Electoral Districts Federal: LaSalle—Émard—Verdun; Ville-Marie—Le Sud-Ouest—Île-des-Sœurs
- Provincial: Verdun

Government
  - Type: Borough
  - Mayor: Céline-Audrey Beauregard (PM)
  - Federal MP(s): Claude Guay (LPC); Marc Miller (LPC)
  - Quebec MNA(s): Alejandra Zaga Mendez (QS)

Area
  - Land: 9.7 km^{2} (3.7 sq mi)

Population (2016)
  - Total: 69,229
  - Density: 7,126/km^{2} (18,460/sq mi)
  - Dwellings: 33,990
- Time zone: UTC−5 (Eastern (EST))
  - Summer (DST): UTC−4 (EDT)
- Postal code(s): H3E, H4G, H4H
- Area codes: (514) and (438)
- Access Routes A-10 A-15: A-20
- Website: montreal.ca/en/verdun

Verdun (/vərˈdʌn/ vər-DUN, Quebec French: [vaɛ̯ʁdœ̃˞]) is a borough (arrondissement) of the city of Montreal, Quebec, located in the southeastern part of the island. From 1907 to 2002, Verdun was a separate municipality from Montreal.

Long known as a working class neighbourhood, it has experienced significant gentrification and social change in the 21st century.

== Etymology ==
The borough's name originates from the seigneurial fief of Verdun established by Zacharie Dupuy, an early settler from the Saverdun region in France.

== History ==
=== Early history ===
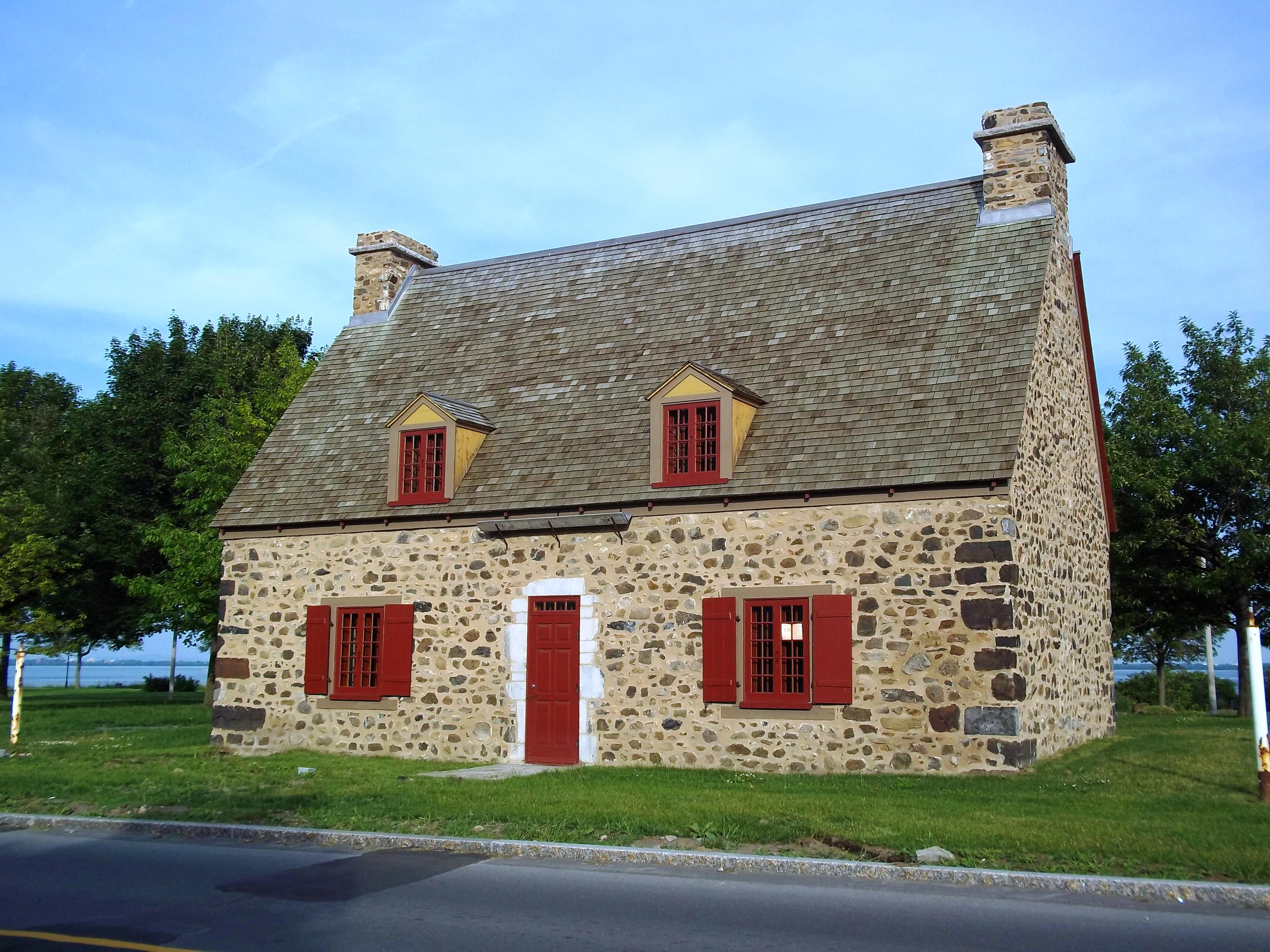
Maison Étienne Nivard de Saint-Dizier, built in 1710

There is archaeological evidence of indigenous peoples in the area as early as 5,500 years ago. A portage along what is now the boulevard LaSalle was used to pass the Lachine Rapids.

A trading post was established at nearby Fort Ville-Marie in 1611 and colonization of the Island of Montreal began in 1642. In 1664 the Île-Saint-Paul (now Nuns' Island) became a seigneury.

The first colonial settlers were militiamen granted concessions in 1665 in exchange for defence against the Iroquois. Afterwards, the area was known as Côte-des-Argoulets (Sharpshooter's Ridge), in reference to the arquebus, an infantry gun. The settlement was where the grande Saint-Pierre river drained Lac à la Loutre into the St. Lawrence River. The lake has since been filled to create the Turcot rail yard, and the St. Pierre partly covered over and partly integrated with canals.

In 1671, the Fief of Verdun is created when land is granted to Zacharie Dupuy, who derived the name Verdun from his native village of Saverdun in France. Two years later he donated the land to the Congrégation de Notre-Dame, who in 1710 built the building now preserved as the Maison Nivard-De Saint-Dizier. This house is named for Étienne Nivard Saint-Dizier, whose father bought the lands from the nuns in 1769.

Following the Great Peace of Montreal in 1701, farmers settled along Lower Lachine Road (now boulevard LaSalle), which connected Fort Ville-Marie with Lachine.

Around 1800, Chemin de la Rivière-Saint-Pierre (now rue de l'Église) was opened. The Canal de l'Aqueduc, now Verdun's northwestern boundary, was dug in 1854 to furnish Montreal with drinking water from the St. Lawrence.

In 1874, a group of local land-owners met in a farmhouse called Le Pavillon, located at the corner of Lower Lachine Road and Chemin de la Rivière-Saint-Pierre, and decided to found the village of Rivière-Saint-Pierre. Chartered by the government of Quebec, it became the municipality of Verdun the following year. Settlement had been hampered due to frequent flooding, but a dyke was built starting in 1896; its completion resulted in a population boom. The dyke itself became host to Verdun's popular Boardwalk, before land reclamation in the 70s led to the expansion of the waterfront park along the whole length of Verdun's riverbank.

The first Église Notre-Dame-des-Sept-Douleurs (now part of the school of the same name) was built in 1899, followed by a combined town hall, fire hall, and police station in 1908. The tramway also arrived in 1899, connecting Verdun to downtown. A larger Église Notre-Dame-des-Sept-Douleurs de Montréal was built in 1914.

=== 20th century ===
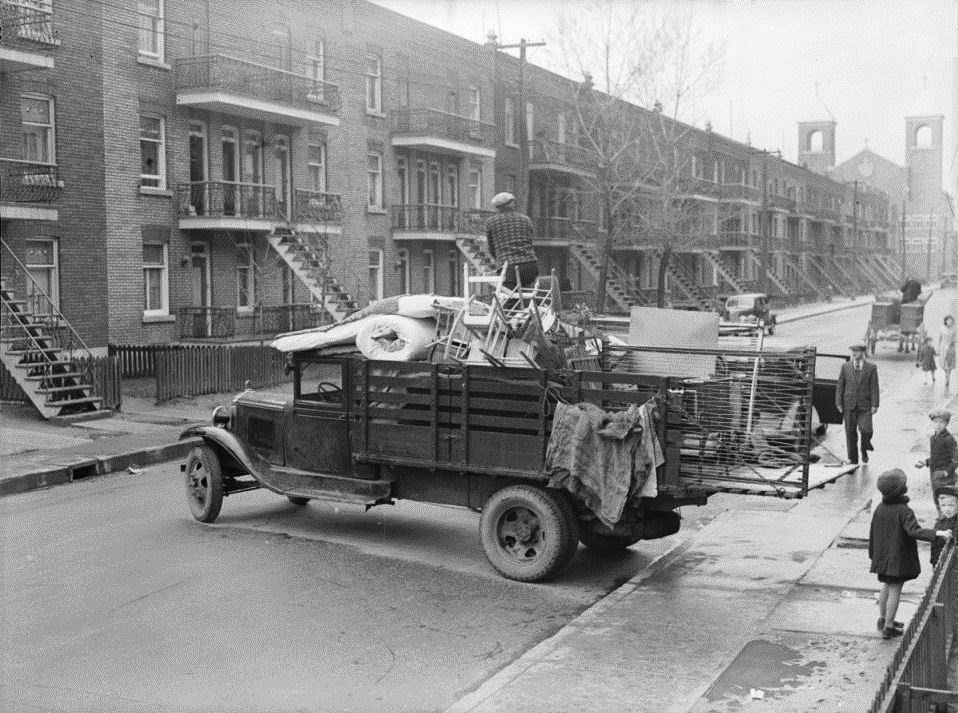
Moving day on 4th avenue, 1938

In 1881, the Montreal Hospital for the Insane was founded as a Protestant counterpart to the Catholic Hôpital Saint-Jean-de-Dieu (now Hôpital Louis-H.-Lafontaine) east of the city. It would be built on two farms, purchased in 1887 and 1907, in the western end of Verdun. Affiliated with McGill University in 1946, it was renamed the Douglas Hospital in 1965. Today, not only is it one of Verdun's largest public institutions, but its campus is one of the borough's most important greenspaces.

Verdun became a town in 1907 and a city in 1912. Between 1911 and 1924 the population tripled and urbanization expanded rapidly "westward" (according to "Montreal directions" - actually due southward), and the farms were divided for residential use. The Moffat area west of rue Desmarchais was built in with "plexes"—the typical Montreal layered apartment—between 1920 and 1930, and the Crawford Park area in the far west of the town was built starting in 1945, in a more suburban style unlike the orthogonal grid used in the rest of Verdun. The Verdun Natatorium was built in 1930, the Verdun Hospital in 1932, and the Verdun Auditorium in 1938.

The municipality of Île-Saint-Paul, occupying what was by then universally known as Nuns' Island or Île des Sœurs, was annexed to Verdun in 1956. Then a chiefly agricultural area, it was rapidly urbanized following the opening of the Champlain Bridge in 1962, with development including contributions by the famous Modernist architect Ludwig Mies van der Rohe. Rapid development would continue to the present day, with the erosion of the sensitive natural woodland of the Domaine Saint-Pierre becoming an increasingly pressing concern.

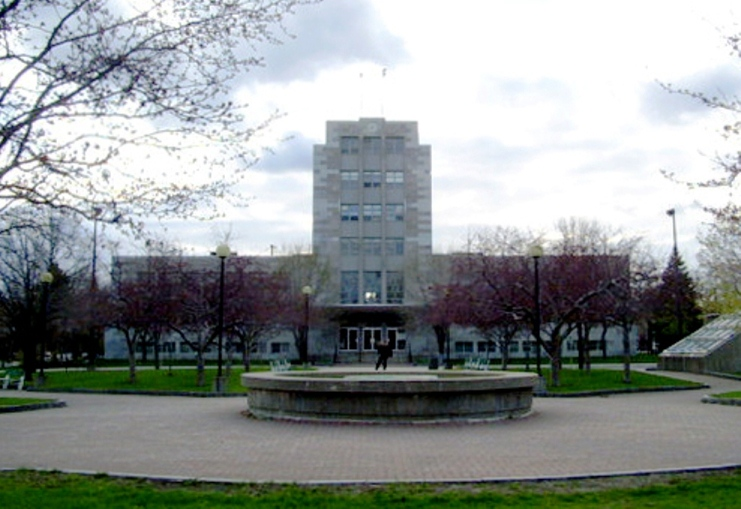
Verdun City Hall, now the borough hall.

Back in Verdun proper, in the post-war period, the area around the church, along rue Wellington and rue de l'Église, became the nucleus of commercial development. A new city hall was built on Rue de Verdun in 1958. The Green Line of the Montreal Metro was extended into Verdun in 1978, its construction delayed due to a collapse in rue Wellington during the construction of De l'Église station. Besides De l'Église in downtown Verdun and Verdun station in front of the town hall, LaSalle station was built in vacant land in a former industrial area in the east of the borough, left vacant by the demolition of the vast British Munitions Supply Co. facilities; the Metro station would become the heart of a new residential area called La Poudrière after the munitions factories.

However, improved access to downtown Montreal meant a decline in local commerce. A program of subsidies and revitalization starting in the 1990s reinvigorated the rue Wellington commercial corridor.

Verduners voted 68% "no" in the 1980 sovereignty referendum and 59.6% "no" in the 1995 referendum. In 1992, Verduners voted 53.66% in favour of the Charlottetown Accord.

=== 21st century ===
In 2002, the municipal reorganization of Montreal saw the city of Verdun become a borough of Montreal. The majority of Verduners chose not to hold a demerger referendum in 2004-2006.

Earlier in the 20th century, Verdun was a partially dry community, with taverns, night clubs and cabarets banned since 1965, and alcohol sales restricted to restaurants with liquor licences, grocery stores and the SAQ. In December 2010, the borough announced that it was planning to allow some microbreweries or performance spaces to sell alcohol. The ban was eventually lifted entirely in 2013, and today Verdun is home to many thriving microbreweries and bars.

In recent years, Verdun, along with the neighbouring Le Sud-Ouest borough, have experienced rapid gentrification and social change. Long considered to be one of the city's poorer neighbourhoods, it has been experiencing a large influx of students and professionals in the last decade.

In 2019, Verdun hosted a part of the Jazz Fest on Wellington Street, to much praise from the public and critics.

In 2020, it was listed as the eleventh "coolest" neighbourhood in the world by Time Out magazine.

== Geography ==
The borough of Verdun is partly located on the Island of Montreal, as well as including all of Nuns' Island.

The Montreal Island part of the borough is defined on its eastern side by the St. Lawrence River, and on the west by the Canal de l'Aqueduc. Several bridges cross the canal to connect Verdun with Ville-Émard and Côte-Saint-Paul. To the south it extends to Avenue Gérald and LaSalle. To the north it extends to Pointe-Saint-Charles and the Quebec Autoroute 15 which connects it to Nun's Island.

Neighbourhoods within Verdun include;

- Desmarchais-Crawford (also called West Verdun), which includes dense early 20th-century residential development, the sprawling Douglas Hospital campus, and the post-war suburban area of Crawford Park
- Wellington-De l'Église, the borough's commercial and institutional downtown surrounded with historically working-class blocks of two- and three-story "plexes" (duplexes, 3-, 4-, 5- and 6-plexes) with their characteristic winding staircases and balconies
- L'Île-des-Sœurs (Nuns' Island), located offshore, home to upscale condo developments and BCE's headquarters

== Demographics ==
Demographics of Verdun:

Historical populations
| Year | Pop. | ±% |
|---|---|---|
| 1881 | 278 | — |
| 1891 | 296 | +6.5% |
| 1901 | 1,898 | +541.2% |
| 1911 | 11,629 | +512.7% |
| 1921 | 25,001 | +115.0% |
| 1931 | 60,745 | +143.0% |
| 1941 | 67,349 | +10.9% |
| 1951 | 77,391 | +14.9% |
| 1956 | 78,262 | +1.1% |
| 1961 | 78,317 | +0.1% |
| 1966 | 76,832 | −1.9% |
| 1971 | 74,715 | −2.8% |
| 1976 | 68,013 | −9.0% |
| 1981 | 61,287 | −9.9% |
| 1986 | 60,246 | −1.7% |
| 1991 | 61,307 | +1.8% |
| 1996 | 59,714 | −2.6% |
| 2001 | 60,564 | +1.4% |
| 2006 | 66,078 | +9.1% |
| 2011 | 66,158 | +0.1% |
| 2016 | 69,229 | +4.6% |

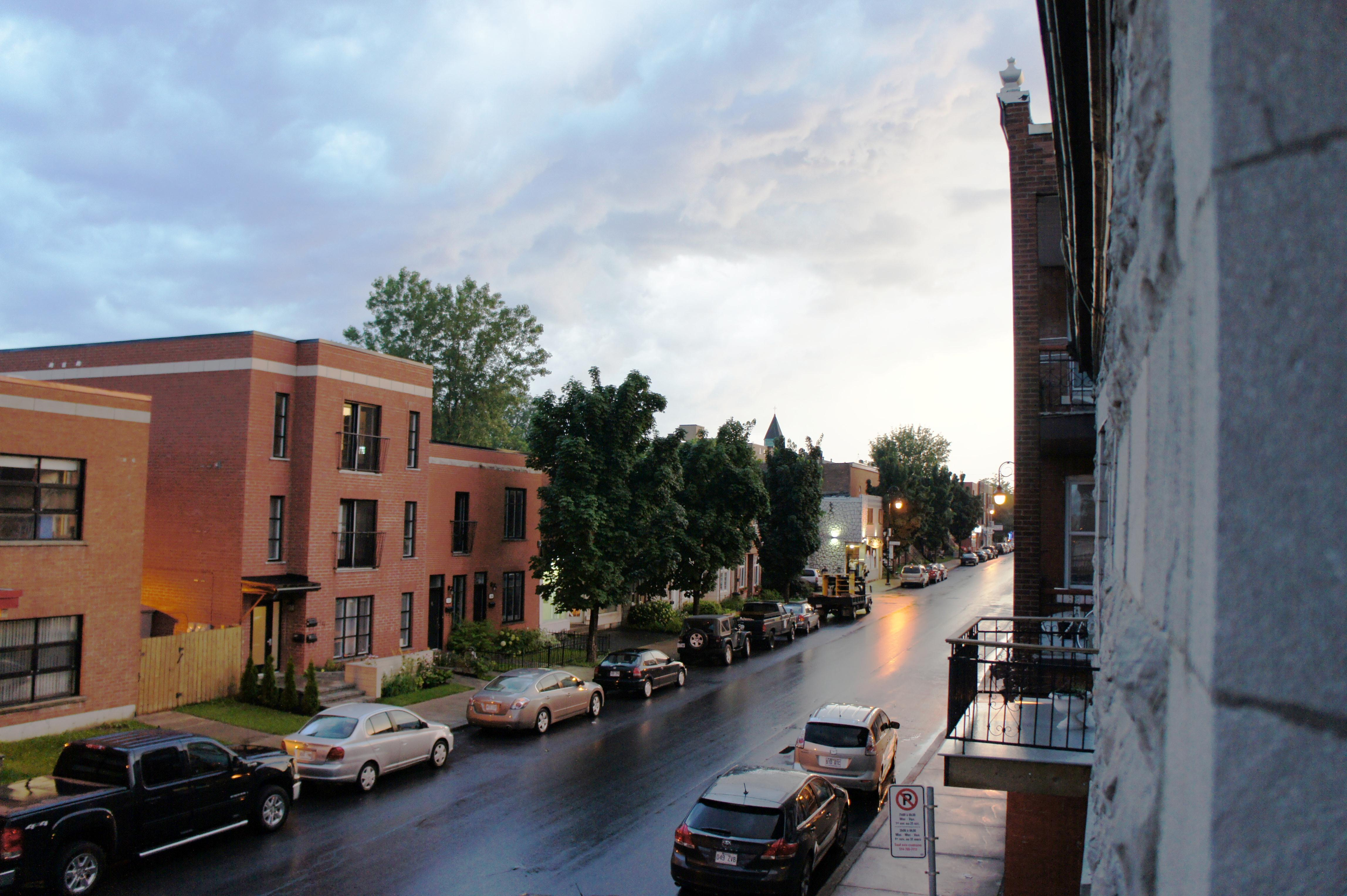
A typical side street in Verdun.

Home language (2016)
| Language | Population | Percentage (%) |
|---|---|---|
| French | 41,085 | 64% |
| English | 13,880 | 22% |
| Other languages | 9,080 | 14% |

Mother tongue (2016)
| Language | Population | Percentage (%) |
|---|---|---|
| French | 40,120 | 61% |
| English | 10,870 | 17% |
| Other languages | 14,530 | 22% |

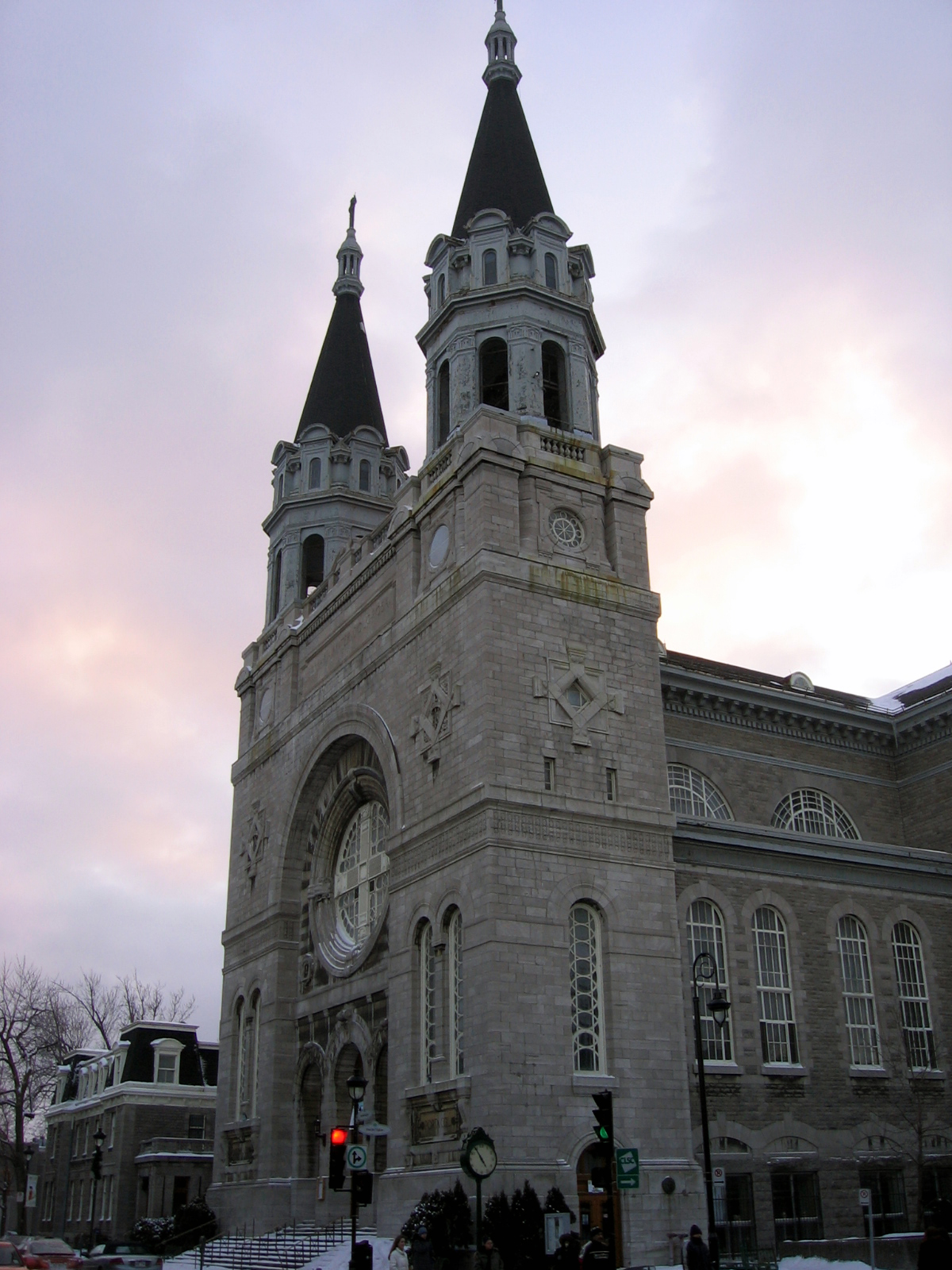
Notre-Dame-des-Sept-Douleurs church, at the centre of downtown Verdun

In the early part of the 20th century, Verdun had a majority English-speaking population and until 1954 — when the 80,000 residents made Verdun the third largest city in Quebec— the anglophone and francophone populations were roughly equal. It is now about two-thirds French-speaking.

Visible Minorities (2016)
| Ethnicity | Population | Percentage (%) |
|---|---|---|
| Not a visible minority | 53,340 | 79.2% |
| Visible minorities | 13,995 | 20.8% |

== Economy ==
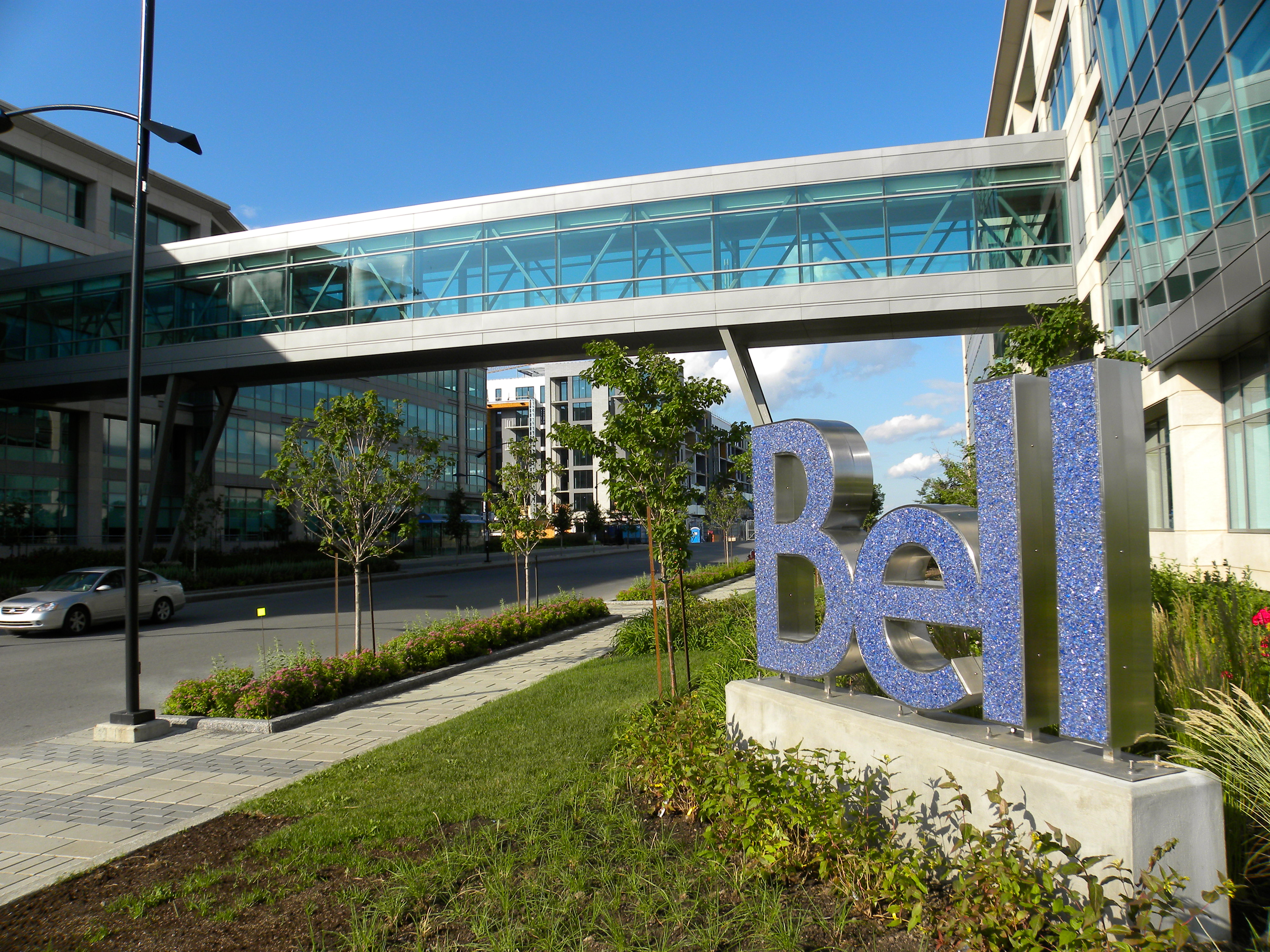
The head office of Bell Canada is located on the northern tip of Nuns' Island.

Verdun was historically a chiefly residential area; however, the late 1990s and 2000s saw a gradual revival of the Wellington Street commercial artery, with several shops, restaurants, and cafés opening.

Bell Canada is also headquartered in Verdun, on the northern tip of Nuns' Island.

Other commercial areas include Verdun Street, Church Street (rue de l'Eglise) and Commerce Place (Place du Commerce) on Nuns' Island.

The Montreal Highland Games, located in Verdun, bring visitors to the neighbourhood each August.

== Transport ==
Verdun has at least one protected bike lane along the entire length of Verdun street, as well as a path along the river. During the summer, Wellington Street fills up with pedestrians, and is closed to motorized traffic. By 2020, Wellington was considered one of the city's trendiest streets, comparable to Mount Royal Avenue in the Plateau, and hosted part of the Jazz Fest in 2019.

Cycling is also available along the Canal de l'Aqueduc on the opposite edge of the borough; on rue de Verdun; and around and through Nuns' Island, including the cycle-accessible Champlain Bridge ice structure connecting to Île Notre-Dame and the south shore.

Verdun is served by Quebec Autoroutes 15 and 20, which skirt the northern and eastern edges of its mainland portion and merge with Autoroute 10 on Nuns' Island. The island is connected to the Island of Montreal and the South Shore via the Champlain Bridge.

The borough is contemplating the possibility of building a service bridge between the Island of Montreal and Nuns' Island. The bridge would connect Boul. Marguerite-Bourgeoys on Nuns' Island with Rue Galt in mainland Verdun. It would be accessible to city services, public transit, cyclists, and pedestrians. Portland, Oregon's Tillikum Crossing is an example of this type of bridge.

The borough is served by the Green Line of the Montreal Metro: Verdun, De l'Église, and LaSalle stations, along with Jolicoeur station immediately across the aqueduct in Ville-Émard. All of these stations have been in service since 1978. Other than the metro, there are also several bus lines including two high frequency lines, the 107 and the 112. The following bus routes pass through Verdun: 12 Île Des Soeurs, 37 Jolicoeur, 38 De l'Église, 61 Wellington, 71 Pointe-Saint-Charles, 107 Verdun, 108 Bannantyne, 112 Airlie, 114 Angrignon, 168 Cité-du-Havre, 172 Du Golf, 176 Berlioz and the 872 Île-des-Soeurs.

The Réseau express métropolitain light metro serves Verdun at Île-des-Soeurs station since July 31, 2023. This provides automated train service connecting Verdun to Montreal Central Station, Brossard, Saint-Laurent, Deux-Montagnes, Downtown Montreal and other areas of Greater Montreal, including, by 2027, Montreal-Trudeau International Airport at YUL–Aéroport-Montréal–Trudeau station.

== Health ==
Significant medical facilities in the borough include the Douglas Mental Health University Institute (commonly known as "the Douglas"), a McGill University psychiatric hospital.

The francophone Hôpital de Verdun, affiliated with the Université de Montréal Faculty of Medicine, is also in the borough.

== Recreation ==
Recreational facilities include the Verdun Auditorium, a hockey arena and concert hall, the home of the now defunct Junior de Montréal team.

Expansive parks (L'Honorable-George-O'Reilly, Mgr-J-A-Richard, and Arthur-Therrien) with bike paths line the banks of the St. Lawrence River, making Verdun one of the few parts of the Island of Montreal to open onto the whole length of its waterfront, a legacy of the flooding that once impeded settlement. The waterfront also features the Verdun Natatorium, public-access docks and a marina, an open-air dancing shell, a lawn bowling green, and football, baseball, and soccer fields. In 2019, a public beach was opened behind the Auditorium.

Another of the borough's major green spaces, the Domaine Saint-Paul (Boisé de l'Île-des-Sœurs), preserves the natural woodland of Nuns' Island, home to more than a hundred species of birds as well as the scarce brown snake. Trails lead through the woodland. The campus of the Douglas Hospital is also a major green space open to the public.

The borough's community centres are the Centre communautaire Marcel-Giroux, near the borough hall; the Centre communautaire Elgar on Nuns' Island; and the Centre culturel de Verdun, in the western part of the borough. The latter two facilities include public libraries and art exhibition spaces.

== Government ==
=== Municipal ===
Verdun is governed by a borough council consisting of the borough mayor and of one city councillor and two borough councillors elected by each of two council districts, for a total of seven members. The borough mayor and the two city councillors represent Verdun on Montreal City Council.

As of the November 7, 2021 Montreal municipal election, the current borough council consists of the following councillors:

| District | Position | Name | Party |
|---|---|---|---|
| — | Borough mayor City councillor | Marie-Andrée Mauger | Projet Montréal |
| Champlain–L'Île-des-Sœurs | City councillor | Véronique Tremblay | Projet Montréal |
| Champlain–L'Île-des-Sœurs | Borough councillor | Céline-Audrey Beauregard | Projet Montréal |
| Champlain–L'Île-des-Sœurs | Borough councillor | Enrique Machado | Projet Montréal |
| Desmarchais-Crawford | City councillor | Sterling Downey | Projet Montréal |
| Desmarchais-Crawford | Borough councillor | Kaïla A. Munro | Projet Montréal |
| Desmarchais-Crawford | Borough councillor | Benoit Gratton | Projet Montréal |

=== Federal and provincial ===
The borough is part of the federal ridings of LaSalle—Émard—Verdun and Ville-Marie—Le Sud-Ouest—Île-des-Sœurs and is coextensive with the provincial riding of Verdun.

== Education ==
=== Elementary and high schools ===
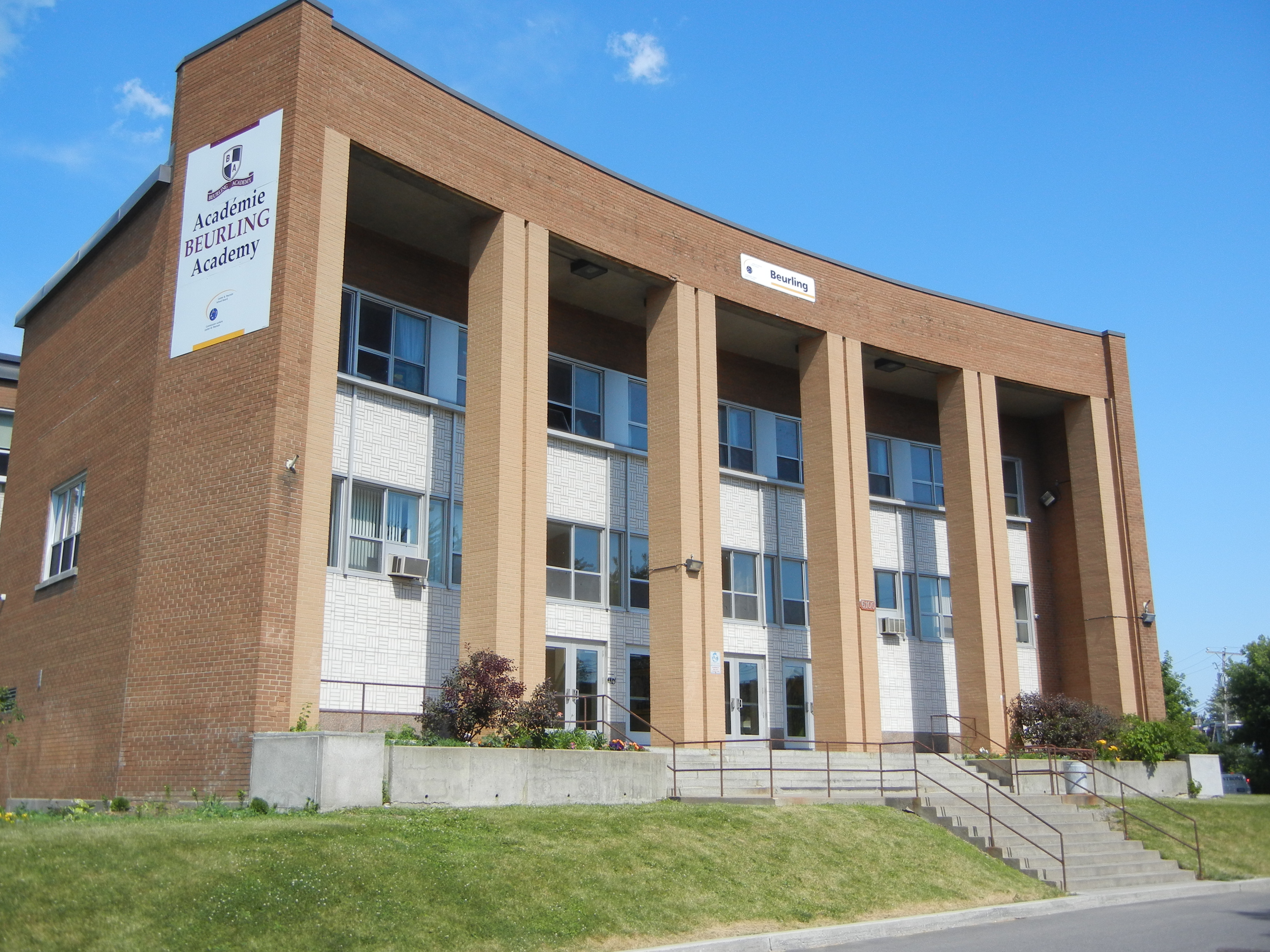
Beurling Academy

The Commission scolaire Marguerite-Bourgeoys (CSMB) operates Francophone public schools.

Adult education centres include:

- Centre d'éducation des adultes Champlain

Professional development centres include:

- Centre de formation professionnelle de Verdun
- Collège d’informatique et d’administration Verdun-LaSalle

High schools include:

- École secondaire Monseigneur-Richard

Elementary schools include:

- Chanoine-Joseph-Théorêt
- Île-des-Soeurs
- Lévis-Sauvé
- Notre-Dame-de-la-Garde
- Notre-Dame-de-la-Paix
- Notre-Dame-de-Lourdes
- Notre-Dame-des-Sept-Douleurs
- Saules Rieurs

The Lester B. Pearson School Board (LBPSB) operates Anglophone public schools.

- Beurling Academy (high school)
- Verdun Elementary School and Riverview Elementary School

Prior to 1998 Commission des écoles catholiques de Verdun operated Roman Catholic schools of all language backgrounds.

=== Public libraries ===
The Montreal Public Libraries Network operates the Île des Sœurs Branch and the Verdun Branch in Verdun.

== Notable people ==
- Jim Bartlett, hockey player, born in Verdun in 1932
- George Frederick Beurling, Canada's most decorated and successful WW2 fighter ace, born in Verdun in 1921
- Mike Bossy, hockey player, born in Verdun in 1957
- Scotty Bowman, hockey coach, born in Verdun in 1933
- Frederick "Skippy" Burchell hockey player, born in Verdun in 1933
- Ian Clyde, boxer, born in Verdun in 1956
- Norman Dawe (1898–1948), sports executive
- Robert Demontigny (1936–2024), singer
- Micheline Dumont, Canadian historian, born in Verdun in 1935
- John Dunning, film producer, born in Verdun in 1927
- David Fennario, Playwright and performer.
- Maynard Ferguson, trumpet player and band leader
- Denis Juneau, artist born in Verdun in 1925
- Ron Lapointe, hockey player and coach, born in Verdun in 1949
- Bobby Lee, ice hockey player
- Pierre Létourneau, singer-songwriter
- René Lépine, real-estate developer & businessman, born in Verdun
- Rick Martin, hockey player, born 1951 in Verdun
- Lise Payette, journalist and politician, born in Verdun in 1931
- Ron Piché, baseball player, born in Verdun in 1935
- Joe Poirier, football player, born in Verdun in 1937
- Gilles Proulx, radio host, born in Verdun in 1940
- Yvon Robert, professional wrestler, born in Verdun in 1914
- Denis Savard, hockey player, raised in Verdun
- Dollard St. Laurent, hockey player, born in Verdun in 1929
- Gino Soccio, Disco guitarist, and producer, born in Verdun in 1955
- Daniel Turp, politician, member of the National Assembly, born in Verdun in 1955
- Stéphane Venne, composer, born in Verdun in 1941
- Juanita Westmoreland-Traoré, Quebec's first black female judge, born in Verdun in 1942
- Walter Young, runner, winner of the 1937 Boston marathon. He worked as a firefighter and was a captain with the Verdun fire department until his retirement in 1978
- Pierre Létourneau, singer-songwriter

== See also ==
- Boroughs of Montreal
- Districts of Montreal
- List of former cities in Quebec
- Municipal reorganization in Quebec
- Where I'm From, a 2014 documentary film by Claude Demers about his childhood in Verdun
