= Maria Natasha Rajah =

Professor and researcher in cognitive neuroscience

- Education: University of Toronto
- Scientific career
- Workplaces: Toronto Metropolitan University (formerly Ryerson); McGill University; University of California, Berkeley
- Website: Rajah laboratory

Maria Natashini "Natasha" Rajah is a Canadian neuroscientist who is a Full Professor at the Department of Psychology, Toronto Metropolitan University. Prior to joining Toronto Metropolitan University (formerly Ryerson) in August 2023, she was Full Professor at the Department of Psychiatry at McGill University from 2005 to July 2023, and was the inaugural Scientific Director of the Cerebral Imaging Center (CIC) at the Douglas Research Centre from 2011 to 2021. She is a cognitive neuroscientist who is interested in episodic memory, ageing and dementia. Her research uses functional magnetic resonance imaging to investigate how sex, gender, and social determinants of health interact with age and affect the neural networks responsible for episodic memory encoding and retrieval.

== Early life and education ==
Rajah studied psychology at the University of Toronto – St. George Campus and obtained her B.Sc. Honours, with a Specialist in Psychology, in 1996. During this time she worked with Randy McIntosh for her undergraduate honours thesis which used O15 positron emission tomography (PET) to study associative learning in young adults. She continued to work with McIntosh for her postgraduate research at University of Toronto and the Rotman Research Institute. She earned her master's degree in 1998 and her doctoral degree in 2003. Her research involved the use of neuroimaging methods to understand ageing and memory. She focused on studying age-related differences in the function of the prefrontal cortex. She moved to the University of California, Berkeley for her postdoctoral research, where she continued her work on ageing and the function of the prefrontal cortex with Mark D'Esposito.

== Research and career ==
In 2005 Rajah was appointed to Douglas Mental Health University Institute and the Department of Psychiatry, McGill University, as an assistant professor. She was awarded a Canadian Institutes of Health Research New Investigator Award in 2007.

Her research involves the use of fMRI to understand the way biological and demographic variables impact the neural networks that mediate memory formation and retrieval across the adult lifespan. This includes studying how biological sex, gender, social determinants of health and lifestyle factors influence brain function in healthy ageing and in adults at risk of late-onset Alzheimer's disease. She uses complementary image analysis techniques (including multivariate, univariate and connectivity analysis) to answer her research questions.

Most recently, Rajah has begun to study memory decline in healthy middle-aged adults over the age of 40. She designed an experiment that showed participants a series of faces, and subsequently asked them to identify where and when the image of a particular face appeared on a screen. During the study Rajah monitored the participant's brains using MRI. She showed that memory decline started in early midlife and was linked to age-related differences in occipital-temporal and ventrolateral prefrontal cortex function. Additional memory decline in older adults was linked to more differences in lateral prefrontal, parietal, and medial temporal function. Rajah concluded that age-related decline in memory may be related to age differences in what middle-aged and older adults consider important information, compared to young adults. She is now investigating sex differences and the effect of menopause on brain function related to memory. Her research has been funded by NSERC, CIHR, FRQS, The Alzheimer's Society of Canada, and The Heart & Stroke Foundation of Canada.

In 2011, Rajah was appointed Director of the Douglas Mental Health University Institute Cerebral Imaging Centre. The centre contains a 3T Siemens Prisma-Fit Trio MRI scanner that can be used for human imaging, as well as 7T Bruker MRI Scanner for imaging small animals. In 2017 Rajah joined the Canadian Open Neuroscience Platform, which shares brain data between Canadian researchers. Rajah was tenured at the level of associate professor, Department of Psychiatry, McGill University in 2016 and was promoted to Full Professor in 2019. She is an Associate Member at the Department of Psychology, McGill University; is a member of the Centre for Research on Brain, Language and Music (CRBLM), Women in Cognitive Science Canada (WiCSC), Memory Disorder's Research Society (MDRS), and the International Society of Behavioral Neuroscience (ISBN). In 2020 she was awarded a CIHR Sex and Gender Research Chair in Neuroscience, Mental Health and Addiction and joined the CIHR Institute of Aging Advisory Board, and Canadian Association of Neuroscience Board of Directors in 2021. She served as Membership Chair for the Canadian Consortium on Neurodegeneration in Aging (CCNA) and was Assistant Dean (Academic Affairs), the Faculty of Medicine and Health Sciences, McGill University.

In August 2023, Dr. Rajah joined the Department of Psychology, Faculty of Arts, Toronto Metropolitan University (formerly Ryerson), where she is a Full Professor and a Canada Research Chair, Tier 1, in Sex, Gender, and Diversity in Brain Health, Memory and Aging. She is also currently the Co-Lead of Team 9 for the CCNA and Co-Chair of their IDEA Committee.

=== Awards and honours ===
- 2007 Canadian Institute of Health Research (CIHR), New Investigator Salary Award
- 2007 Fonds de la Recherche en Santé Québec (FRSQ), Junior 1 Salary Award
- 2013 John R. & Clara M. Fraser Memorial Award
- 2014 Fonds de Recherche du Québec - Santé (FRQ-S), Junior 2 Salary Award
- 2019 Women in Cognitive Science Canada Mentorship Award
- 2019 McGill University Haile T. Debas Prize
- 2020 CIHR Sex and Gender Research Chair in Neuroscience, Mental Health and Addiction
- 2023 Canada Research Chair Tier 1 in "Sex, Gender, and Diversity in Brain Health, Memory, and Aging"

=== Selected publications ===
- Rajah, M Natasha; D'Esposito, Mark (2005). "Region-specific changes in prefrontal function with age: a review of PET and fMRI studies on working and episodic memory". Brain. 128 (9): 1964–1983. doi:10.1093/brain/awh608. PMID 16049041.
- McIntosh, Anthony Randal; Rajah, M Natasha; Lobaugh, Nancy J (2005). "Interactions of prefrontal cortex in relation to awareness in sensory learning". Science. 284 (5419): 1531–1533. doi:10.1126/science.284.5419.1531. PMID 10348741.
- Grady, Cheryl; Rajah, M Natasha; Craik, Fergus IM (1998). "Neural correlates of the episodic encoding of pictures and words". Proceedings of the National Academy of Sciences. 95: Neural correlates of the episodic encoding of pictures and words.

She is Co-Editor in Chief for Aging, Neuropsychology and Cognition, Associate Editor for Psychological Science, and Senior Editor for Brain Research.
