= Paul Jensen =

Paul Jensen may refer to:

- Paul Jensen (Home and Away)
- Paul Jensen (ice hockey) (born 1955), American ice hockey player
- Paul Hilmar Jensen (1930–2004), Norwegian philatelist

== See also ==
- Poul Jensen (disambiguation)
