= Verdun Natatorium =

Outdoor swimming pool in Verdun

Coordinates: 45.4436°N 73.5759°W

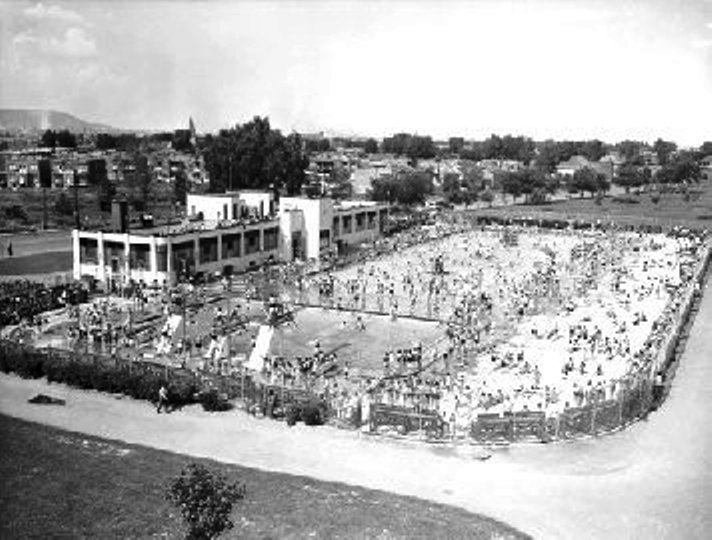
Verdun Natatorium, 1940

The Verdun Natatorium is an Art Deco natatorium in Verdun, Quebec.

== Origins ==
The first outdoor swimming pool in the Montreal area, the facility was built in 1939–1940 with the assistance of the Quebec provincial government. The Verdun Guardian newspaper reported on the official opening on July 12, 1940 and inaugurated by Johnny Weissmuller, with the pool hosting the 1940 Dominion Swimming and Diving Championships, shortly afterward.

== Finances ==
The city of Verdun took out a $200,000 loan to fund construction. Once open, the pool's admission revenue covered operating costs and allowed Verdun to pay back its loan. The city paid back $9,500 each year from 1941 to 1945, and approximately $11,000 each year from 1946 to 1951. By 1951, the Natatorium had never lost money and was projected to fully pay off its loan in ten more years. Many of the workers were men that were receiving "workfare" a benefit for people out of work due to the great depression. Skilled workers such as steamfitters were paid to build the Natatorium for the city.

== Facility ==
The city of Montreal states that the main pool can accommodate 1,150 bathers while in 1951 the Montreal Gazette, reported that the pool could handle up to 6,000 swimmers on a daily basis. This difference may be due to changes to the facility and/or safety regulations over time. In the summer 2005, a heated wading pool was added, with a capacity of up to 250 children.

Since 2017, the main building has had structural problems and has been closed to the public. In April 2024, new plans are in the works, possibly involving demolition of the historic structure.
