= Hôpital de Verdun =

Hospital in Montreal, Quebec, Canada

- CIUSSS du Centre-Sud-de-L’Île-de-Montréal
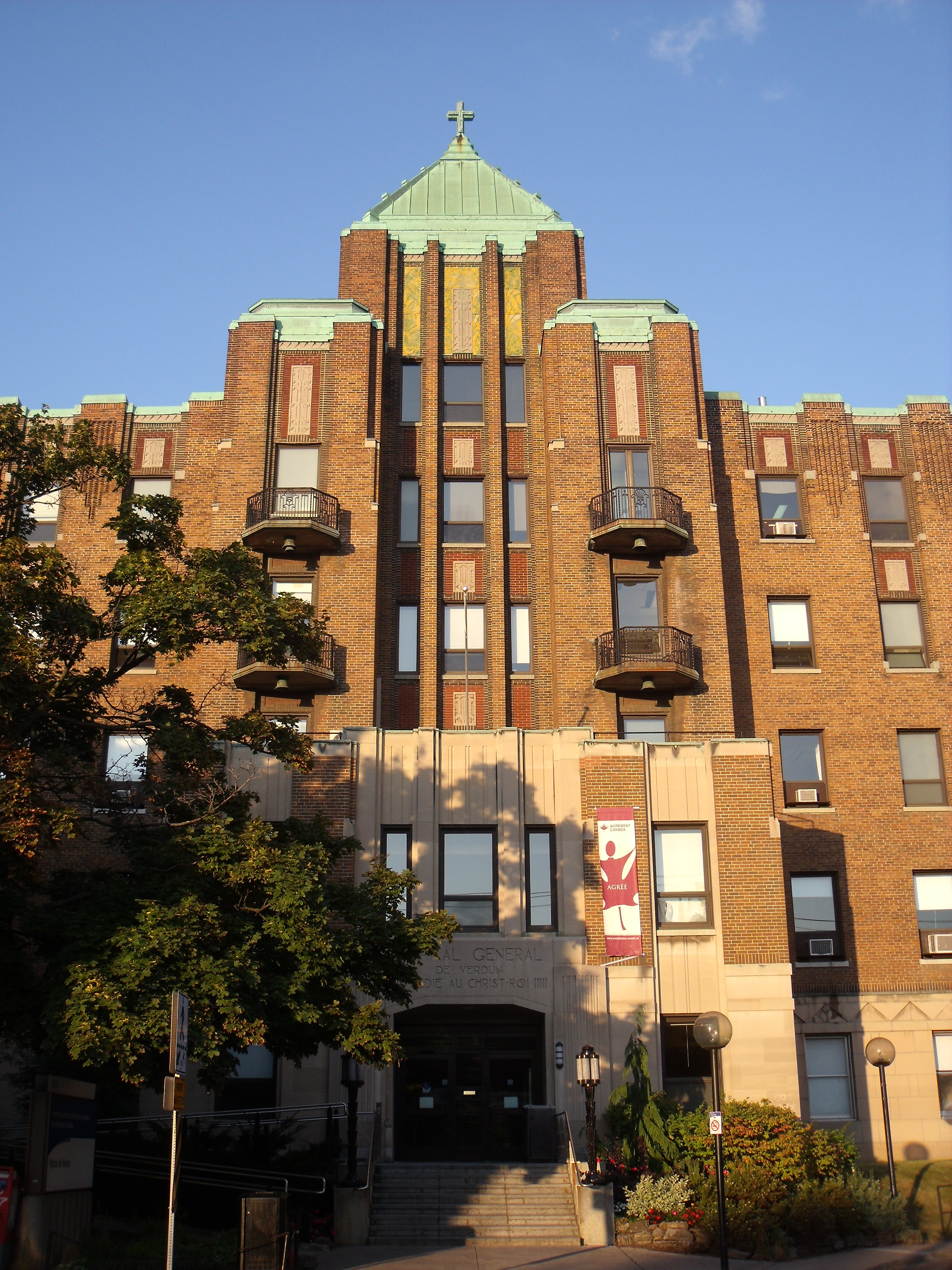

- Location in Montreal

Geography
- Location: 4000, boulevard LaSalle; Montreal, Quebec; H4G 2A3
- Coordinates: 45.463889°N 73.563889°W

Organisation
- Care system: RAMQ (Quebec medicare)
- Type: Teaching, District General
- Affiliated university: Université de Montréal Faculty of Medicine

Services
- Beds: 244

History
- Founded: 1932

Links
- Website: https://www.ciusss-centresudmtl.gouv.qc.ca/etablissement/hopital-de-verdun

Hôpital de Verdun (English: Verdun General Hospital) is a hospital in Montreal, Quebec, Canada. It is located at 4000 LaSalle Boulevard in the borough of Verdun.

== Background ==
The hospital was designed by Alphonse Venne in an Art-Deco style, built between 1930 and 1931 and then opened in 1932, it now employs 1,600 people. It is affiliated with the Université de Montréal Faculty of Medicine.

== Services ==
It is a general hospital, specializing in family medicine. It provides services in cardiology, nephrology, pneumology, neurology, general surgery, orthopedic surgery, urology, oncology, gastroenterology and ophthalmology.
