= Montreal Highland Games =

The Montreal Highland Games (fr: Jeux écossais de Montréal) is a highland games event held in Verdun, Montreal, Quebec. The modern games were founded in 1976 but the event traces its origins to 1855, making it the oldest Scottish festival in Canada. The games have been held at various sites in Greater Montreal over the years. It has been held in the 2020s at the Douglas Mental Health University Institute in Verdun.

In 2019, the Games had female competitors for the first time.

In May 2025, organizers cancelled that year's games without providing a reason. They said that they hoped to return in 2026.
