= Commission des écoles catholiques de Verdun =

Roman Catholic school district in Quebec, Canada

Commission des écoles catholiques de Verdun was a Roman Catholic school district headquartered in Verdun, Quebec.

It was dissolved after 1998. Currently Commission scolaire Marguerite-Bourgeoys operates secular Francophone schools in Verdun, while Lester B. Pearson School Board operates secular Anglophone schools in Verdun.

== Schools ==
Secondary:

- École secondaire Notre-Dame-du-Sourire
- École secondaire Mgr-Richard
- École Polyvalente catholique anglaise de Verdun (English: Verdun English Catholic Comprehensive School)

Primary:

- Chanoine-Joseph-Théorêt
- École primaire Île des Soeurs
- Lévis-Sauvé
- Notre-Dame-de-Lourdes
- Notre-Dame-de-la-Garde
- Notre-Dame-de-la-Paix
- Notre-Dame-des-Sept-Douleurs
- St-Thomas More - English-language school
