= Walter Young (athlete) =

Canadian snowshoe racer and runner

Personal information
- Nationality: Canadian
- Born: March 14, 1913 Lime Ridge, Quebec
- Died: December 28, 2004 (aged 91) Mission, British Columbia
- Occupation(s): Runner, Firefighter
- Employer(s): Verdun, Quebec Fire Department
- Spouse: Muriel Young

Sport
- Sport: Long distance running
- Updated on 16 July 2014

Walter Young was a snowshoe racer and runner from Quebec, Canada. He won the 1937 Boston Marathon in a time of 2:33:20 during unseasonably hot conditions. Young defeated the second place runner, John A. Kelley, by over six minutes.

Young later worked as a firefighter. He was a captain with the Verdun, Quebec fire department until his retirement in 1978. Upon his wife's death in 1996 he relocated to Mission, British Columbia to be with his son.
