= Poul Jensen =

Poul Jensen may refer to:

- Poul Jensen (astronomer), Danish astronomer
- Poul Richard Høj Jensen (born 1944), Danish Olympic sailor
- Poul Jensen (footballer, born 1934) (1934–2000), Danish football (soccer) player who won a silver medal at the 1960 Summer Olympics
- Poul Jensen (footballer, born 1899) (1899–1991), Danish football (soccer) player who played 30 games for the Danish national team
- Poul Ove Jensen (born 1937), Danish architect
- Poul Toft Jensen (1912–2000), Danish football (soccer) player who played 13 games for the Danish national team
- Poul Jensen, Danish chairman for the football club FC Fyn
