= Poul Ove Jensen =

Danish architect

Poul Ove Jensen (born 10 March 1937) is a Danish architect. He is the director of the bridge department at Dissing+Weitling. He was responsible for the design of over 200 bridges in 30 countries.

== Biography ==
Poul Ove Jensen was born on 10 March 1937 in Kauslunde, Denmark. He graduated from the Royal Danish Academy of Fine Arts School of Architecture.

== Career ==
Jensen was employed by Arne Jacobsen from 1963-1971, and joined Dissing+Weitling in 1972. He became a partner in 1986. Along with Pouli Hoffgård Møller, he was the firm's project manager for the Great Belt Fixed Link. The work is a Danish Culture Canon.

Jensen also participated in the design of the Øresund Bridge, linking Copenhagen, Denmark and Malmö, Sweden as well as the Stonecutters Bridge in Hong Kong.

Jensen received the Eckersberg Medal in 2011.

On 2 December 2013, Jensen was announced as the consultant for the firm Arup_Group that will replace the Champlain Bridge linking Montreal and Brossard, Quebec, Canada.

== See also ==
- COWI
- Messina Bridge
