= Nuns' Island =

Neighbourhood in Montreal, Quebec

Nuns' Island Île-des-Sœurs
- Neighbourhood
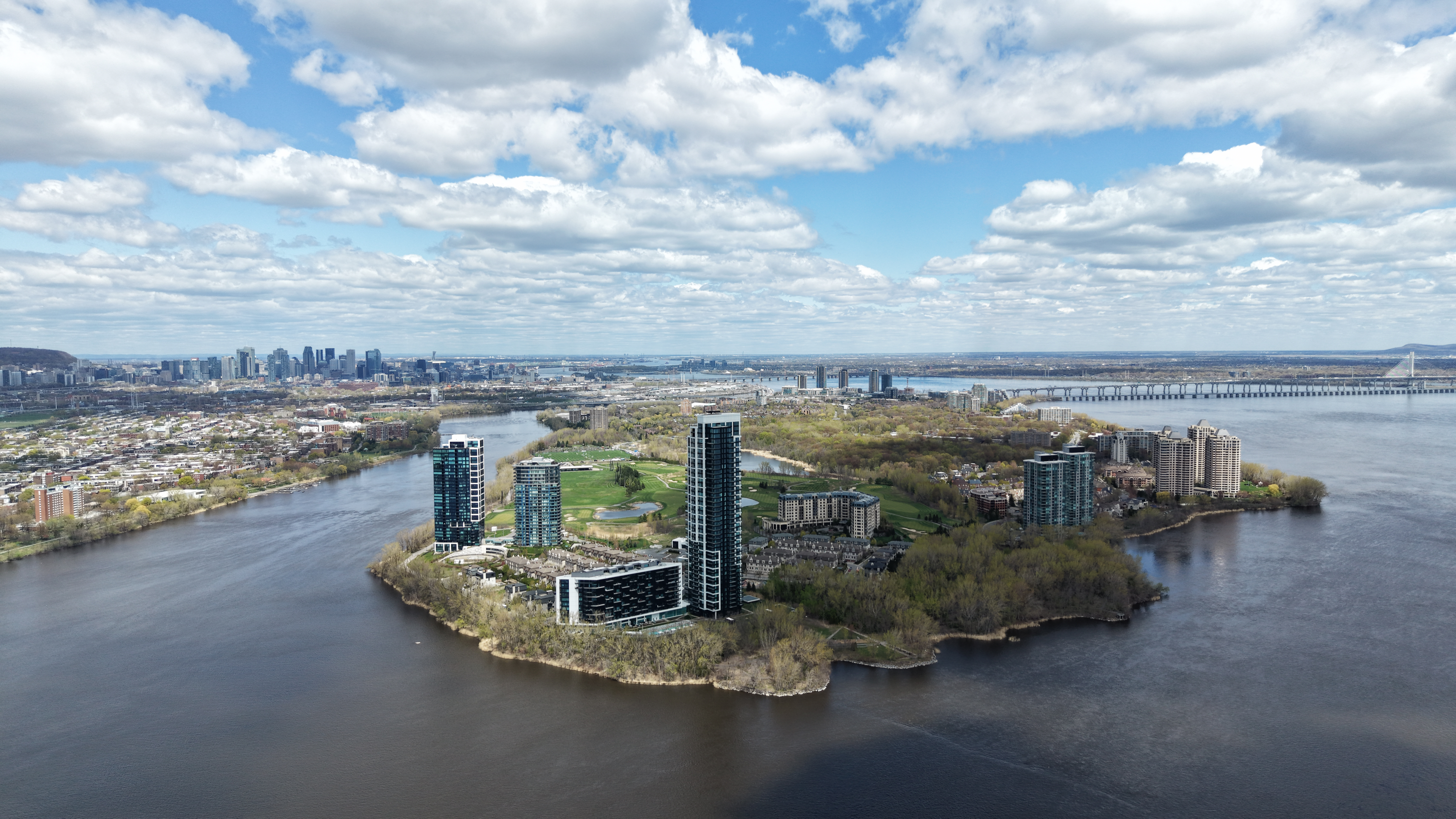
- Skyline of the southern tip of Nuns' Island

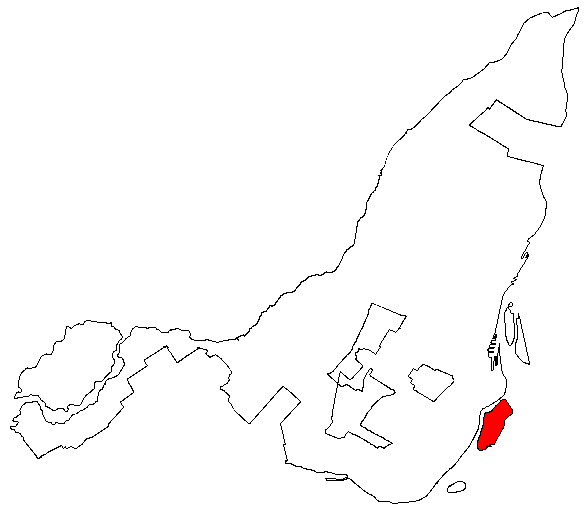
- Coordinates: 45°27′40″N 73°32′36″W
- Country: Canada
- Province: Quebec
- City: Montreal
- Borough: Verdun

Area
  - Total: 3.74 km^{2} (1.44 sq mi)

Population (2016)
  - Total: 20,461
  - Density: 5,470.9/km^{2} (14,170/sq mi)
- Time zone: UTC-5 (Eastern (EST))
  - Summer (DST): UTC-4 (EDT)
- Postal code(s): H3E
- Area codes: (514) and (438)

Nuns' Island (French: Île des Sœurs, pronounced [il dɛ sœʁ]) is an island located in the Saint Lawrence River that forms a part of the city of Montreal, Quebec. It is part of the borough of Verdun.

== History ==
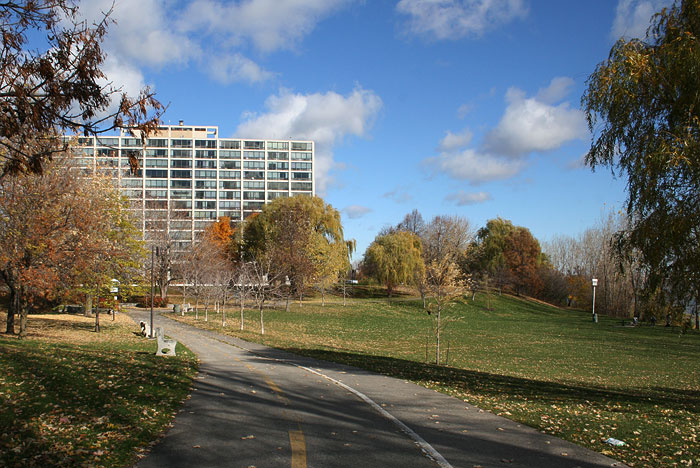
West Vancouver Park on Nuns' Island.

Originally called Île Saint-Paul in honour of the founder of Montreal, Paul de Chomedey, Sieur de Maisonneuve, the island was initially acquired in 1634 by Jean de Lauzon, future governor of New France. The island was included in the expansive seigneurie of La Citière on the south shore of the St. Lawrence. In 1664 he ceded the island in three equal parts to three prominent citizens of Ville-Marie: Jacques Le Ber, sieur de Saint-Paul et Senneville; Claude Robutel de Saint-André, sieur de La Noue; and Jean de la Vigne, who transferred his portion to Jacques Le Ber's sister Marie in 1668. She, in turn, sold her share to her brother, leaving the island divided between the seigneuries of Saint-Paul and La Noue.

The nuns of the Congrégation de Notre-Dame acquired the seigneurie de La Noue in 1706. Following the British conquest, the other seigneurie was auctioned; the nuns purchased it too in 1769, becoming the sole owners of the island for the next 187 years. Their ownership would give the island its unofficial name, attested since the early 19th century.

The nuns farmed the island, building houses and agricultural buildings, and later hired women to help with raising livestock. Owing to a dispute between the congregation and the municipality of Verdun over taxes in the late 19th century, the island, which had no fixed link to the Island of Montreal, was made a municipality (L'Île-Saint-Paul) in 1899.

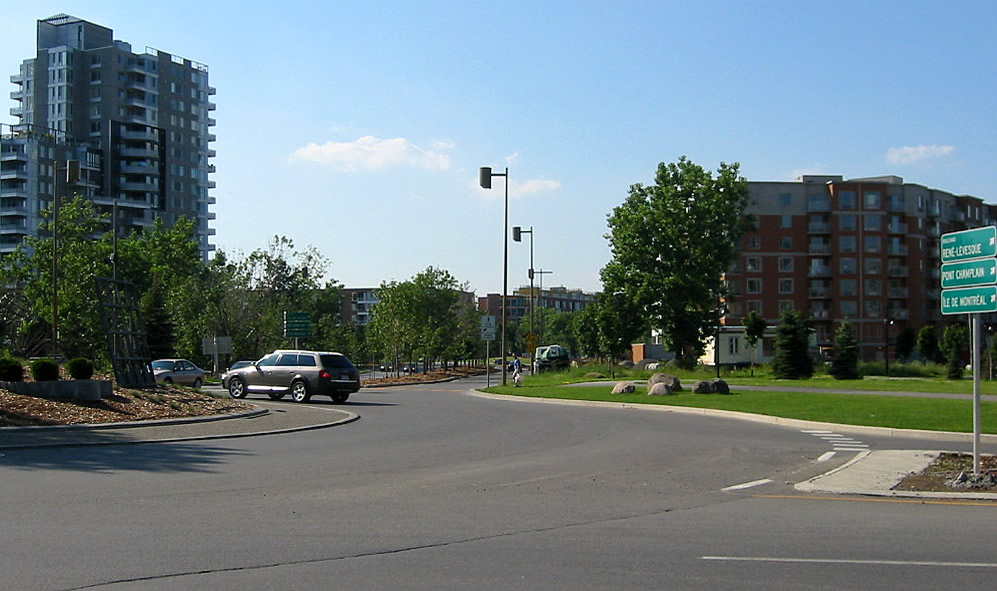
A traffic circle on Nuns' Island

The nuns continued farming until 1956, when they sold the island to the Quebec Home and Mortgage Co. Ltd. In the same year, the provincial government merged it with Verdun. By that time the name Saint-Paul had fallen out of use, and the name île des Sœurs was officialized. The nuns entirely left the island in 1957.

Historical populations
Year	Pop.	±%
1971	3,925	—
1976	5,702	+45.3%
1981	5,789	+1.5%
1986	7,416	+28.1%
1991	10,693	+44.2%
1996	12,186	+14.0%
2001	13,156	+8.0%
2006	16,210	+23.2%
2011	18,315	+13.0%

The development of the island began in earnest with the opening of the Champlain Bridge in 1962. The urbanization was carried out by the Metropolitan Structures company of Chicago, under a master plan by the American company of Johnson, Johnson, and Roy. Several master plans were previously drawn up by the architect Harold Ship, but they were never realized. Phase 1 of the master plan was completed in 1968 when the first 3000 inhabitants moved into the first leased 800 units. A second phase, still in accordance with the master plan, was completed the following year, notably including four buildings by Ludwig Mies van der Rohe: three high rise apartment buildings, the first of which, 201 rue Corot, was occupied in 1969, and an Esso filling station of the same vintage. By the mid-1970s, significant areas to the south of the island were reclaimed from the St. Lawrence and eclectic constructions sprung in various parts of the island. Unsystematic construction has continued rapidly since then. The island was also the filming location for a horror film called They Came from Within a.k.a. Shivers, directed by Canadian filmmaker David Cronenberg in 1975. The island's hotel tower doubled for the film's "Starliner Tower" apartment building.

== Geography ==
Nun's island during winter. North is up.

The 3.74-square-kilometre (1.44 sq mi) island is part of the Hochelaga Archipelago in the St. Lawrence River. It is located immediately southeast of the Island of Montreal, from which it is separated by a narrow channel, and north of the La Prairie Bassin.

Soils are mostly of clay loam to clay texture, and usually somewhat poorly drained (MacDonald series). Very poorly drained clay was mapped as Laplaine series, and areas of well-drained glacial till were mapped as Chateaugay clay loam or St. Bernard loam. A small gravel deposit at the northern end was mapped as Ste-Philomène sandy loam.

The island is noted for its parks and scenery including West Vancouver Park which overlooks the Saint Lawrence River. The 64 acre (26-hectare) Domaine Saint-Paul natural woodland in the southern part of the island, a crucial nesting area for more than a hundred species of birds, is one of the last remaining natural woodlands in southern Montreal. It has been progressively eroded by development. The woodland surrounds an artificial lake called Lac des Battures. This lake was actually created by accident as parts of the river known as "water lots" became landlocked during landfill operations in the 1960s and 1970s. Most of this landfill came from the excavation of Montreal's underground Metro system in the mid-1960s. That part of the island was subject to annual floods caused by spring runoff. The resulting dykes and fill allowed an additional few million square feet to be used for development as well as a golf course.

== Government ==
Nuns' Island is part of the borough of Verdun, making up the neighbourhood of L'Île-des-Sœurs and forming part of the city council district of Champlain–L'Île-des-Sœurs with the eastern third of "mainland" Verdun. As part of Verdun, it is part of the federal riding of Ville-Marie—Le Sud-Ouest—Île-des-Sœurs and the provincial riding of Verdun.

== Economy ==
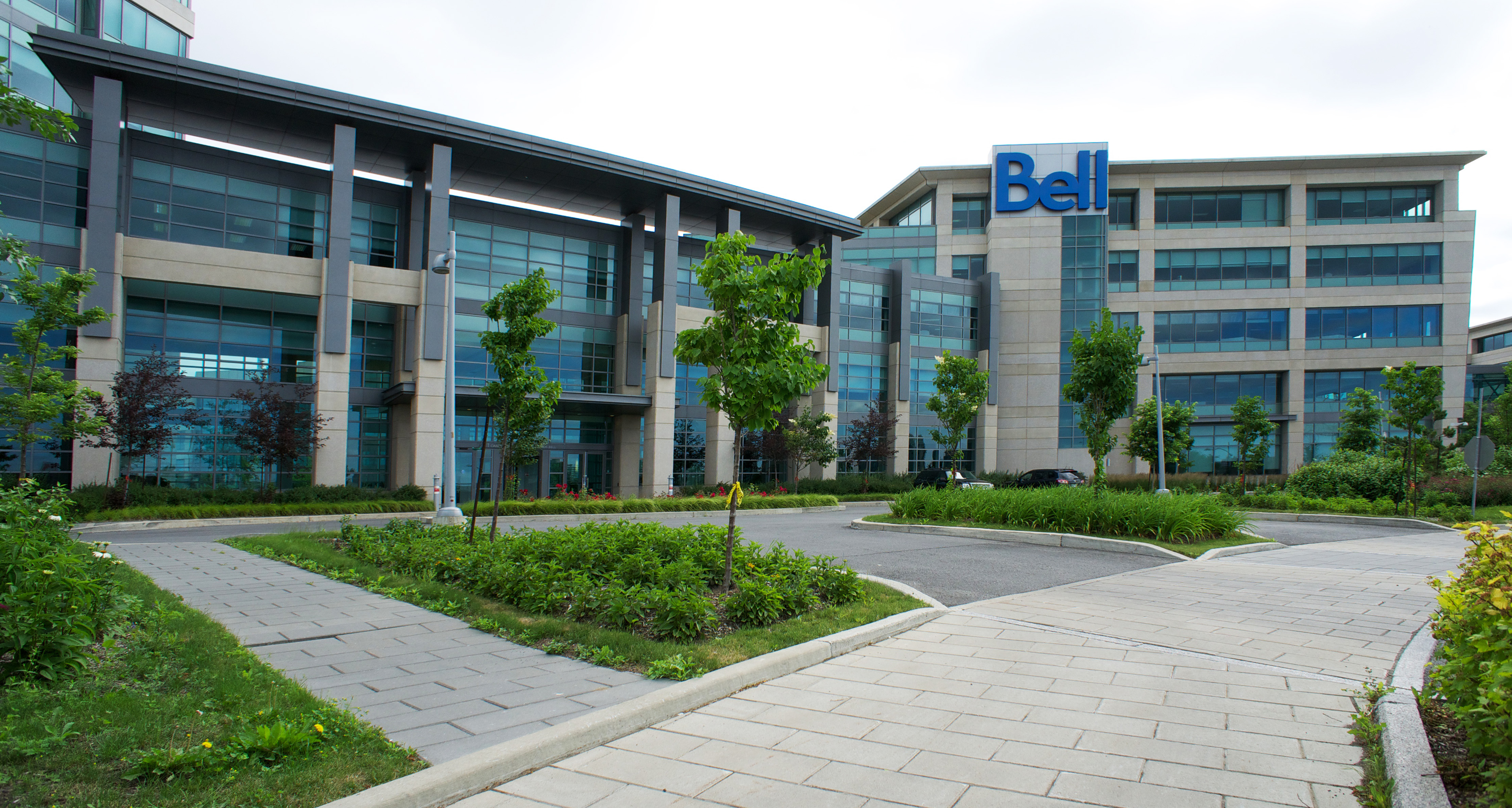
Part of the Bell Campus, the headquarters of Bell Canada.

Commercial services are clustered in malls around the Place du Commerce shopping centre near the Champlain Bridge, with civic services including a community centre and church around Place Elgar.

A recent development is the construction of the campus headquarters of Bell Canada on the northern tip of the island. In 2009 Bell Canada, the largest communications company in Canada, consolidated their workers from several locations throughout Montreal at a new complex on Nuns' Island, which also serves as the national headquarters of the company. The campus consists of a cluster of five low-rise buildings, located at the Autoroute 10 and 15 highway interchange at the northerly end of the island.

A substantial part of Nuns' Island is leased by Structures Metropolitaines from the current landowners of the Island. the Place du Commerce shopping centre.

== Infrastructure ==
The Décarie South Expressway (Autoroute 15) runs through Nuns' Island, connecting it to the south bank of the St. Lawrence River via the Champlain Bridge and to the Island of Montreal via the Pont de l'Île-des-Sœurs, part of the Champlain Bridge complex. The Clément Bridge connects the island with the Bonaventure Expressway (Aut. 10).

There are only two schools on the island, École primaire Île-des-Sœurs and École des Marguerite. The elementary schools are both part of Montreal's French-language Marguerite-Bourgeoys School Board.

A rapid transit station, Île-des-Sœurs station, opened in July 2023, as part of the driverless Réseau express métropolitain line between downtown Montreal and Brossard.

=== Connecting bus routes ===
Société de transport de Montréal
No.	Route	Service Times
12	Île-des-Sœurs	All-day 6 am ~ 11 pm
168	Cité-du-Havre	Weekdays 5 am ~ 9 pm
172	du Golf	Weekdays 5 am ~ 1:30 am
176	Berlioz	All-day 5 am ~ 1:30 am

== See also ==
- Hochelaga Archipelago
- List of islands of Quebec
