= Douglas Mental Health University Institute =

Hospital in Montreal, Canada

Douglas Mental Health University Institute Institut universitaire en santé mentale Douglas
- CIUSSS de l'Ouest-de-L’Île-de-Montréal
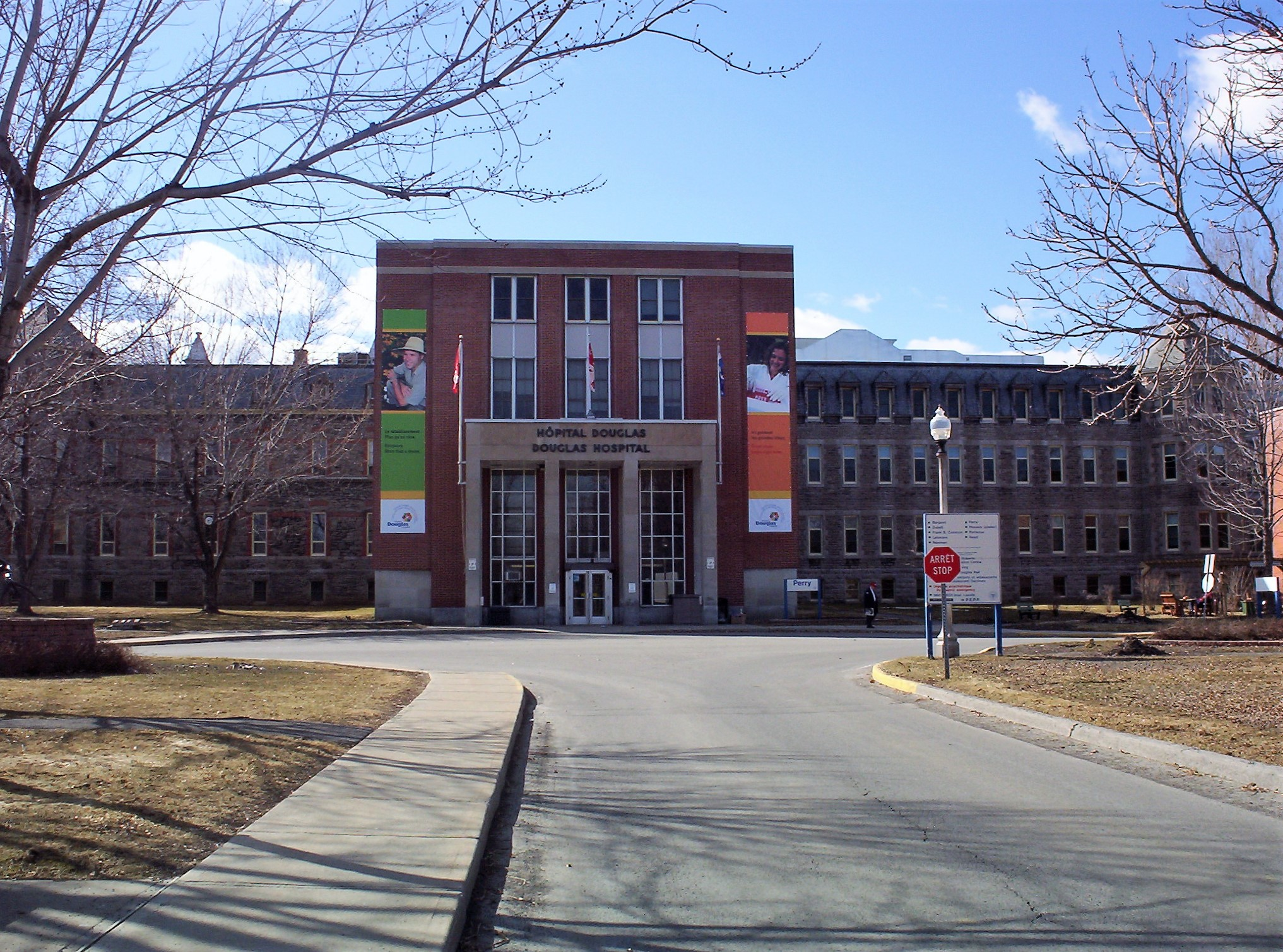

- Location within Montreal

Geography
- Location: Montreal, Quebec, Canada
- Coordinates: 45.442206°N 73.585401°W

Organization
- Care system: RAMQ (Quebec medicare)
- Type: Specialist
- Affiliated university: McGill University Faculty of Medicine

Services
- Speciality: Psychiatric

History
- Founded: July 19, 1881

Links
- Website: www.douglas.qc.ca
- Lists: Hospitals in Canada

The Douglas Mental Health University Institute (French: Institut universitaire en santé mentale Douglas; formerly the Douglas Hospital and originally the Protestant Hospital for the Insane) is a Canadian psychiatric hospital, located in the borough of Verdun in the city of Montreal, Quebec. It is also a teaching hospital affiliated with McGill University.

== History ==
Founded on July 19, 1881, by Alfred Perry and a group of Protestant clergy and Montreal citizens, the Douglas Institute was originally named the "Protestant Hospital for the Insane." At the time, Montreal had another psychiatric hospital, but it was a francophone Catholic hospital, and the Douglas was meant to offer psychiatric services to the anglophone Protestant minority. The founders put an advertisement in the local newspaper to seek funds for a new building to be constructed, and local philanthropists offered donations.

In 2006, the Douglas was designated a University Institute in Mental Health. It is named in honour of James Douglas (1800–1886) and his family. Douglas (whose family name is sometimes spelled Douglass) was a Scottish-born physician who practiced in Quebec City and was involved in the foundation of the Asile de Beauport.

== Admission and treatment ==
The Reed Pavilion takes in patients who call to receive treatment through Emergency. It has an Intensive Care Unit on the right side and Psychiatric Emergency on the left. Patients are held there for evaluation by a psychiatrist. After diagnosis, if the patient accepts the treatment, he or she will usually stay until well enough to return to society. If the patient refuses treatment and the evaluating psychiatrist deems him or her a risk to himself or society, the patient and psychiatrist are heard by a judge who will confirm or deny a temporary involuntary commitment order. If returned to the hospital, the patient is usually transferred to another unit. One of these units is called the "Centre Psychiatrique Communautaire" (The Psychiatric Community Centre) or CPC2. The CPC2 is a place where patients can stay for a maximum 20 days until they can re-enter the community. Although sometimes they may stay longer due to a court order. The patients must stay until the psychiatrist gives clearance to leave.

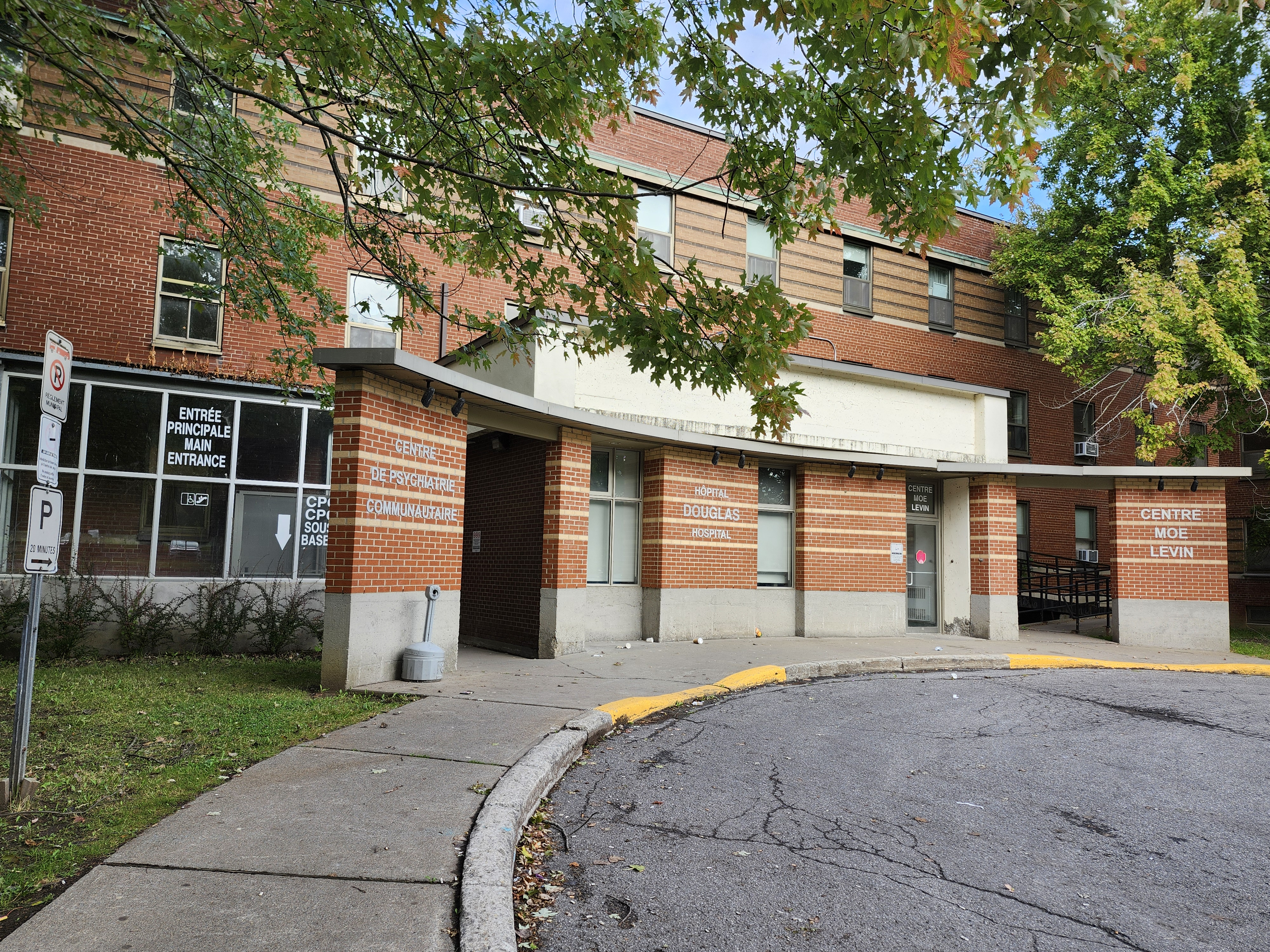
"Centre Psychiatrique Communautaire"

== Foundation ==
The Douglas Mental Health University Institute Foundation is a nonprofit organization that seeks donations for the Douglas Mental Health University Institute. The Douglas Institute is the second largest mental health research centre in Canada. It treats patients with mental illness, researches the causes of mental illness, and supports knowledge transfer between mental health practitioners. The Foundation's most recent contribution was towards a $20 million brain imaging centre scheduled to open in 2011. It also funds the World Health Organization (WHO) Collaborating Centre. The Foundation remains an independent public organization.

The Douglas Institute Foundation was created in 1972. Its mandate was to collect and manage donations through the help of volunteers. The Foundation is led and supported by a Board of Directors made up of 24 members who are elected at the Foundation's annual public assembly.

The institute's approach includes prevention, treatment, and public intervention. The Institute houses ongoing studies about the genetic component of mental illness and the environmental triggers, that, when combined with a certain genetic predisposition, can make some people more vulnerable. When an illness manifests itself, sufferers and family members are able to seek treatment and support at the institute, whether through an initial diagnosis at its own emergency room or by referral from a healthcare professional. To further develop understanding of mental disorders, the Institute studies public access to and usage of available resources so that these can be improved and mental illness better treated and prevented.

== Maison Claude-Laramée ==
Douglas Institute helped in creating Maison Claude-Laramée (MCL) in Verdun, in the Montreal area. MCL is a rehabilitation residence for people who have severe long-lasting psychotic illness and also drug or alcohol abuse or dependence. Serving nine people at a time, in single rooms, MCL is jointly run by Douglas Institute and the Old Brewery Mission.

== See also ==
- Allan Memorial Institute
- Institut Philippe-Pinel de Montréal
- Institut universitaire en santé mentale de Montréal
- Montreal Highland Games, held on the grounds of the Douglas each summer
- Montreal Neurological Institute and Hospital
- Old Brewery Mission
- Montreal Wanderers RFC, play rugby on hospital grounds
