= Champlain Bridge (Montreal, 1962–2019) =

Bridge in Quebec

Champlain Bridge Pont Champlain (French)
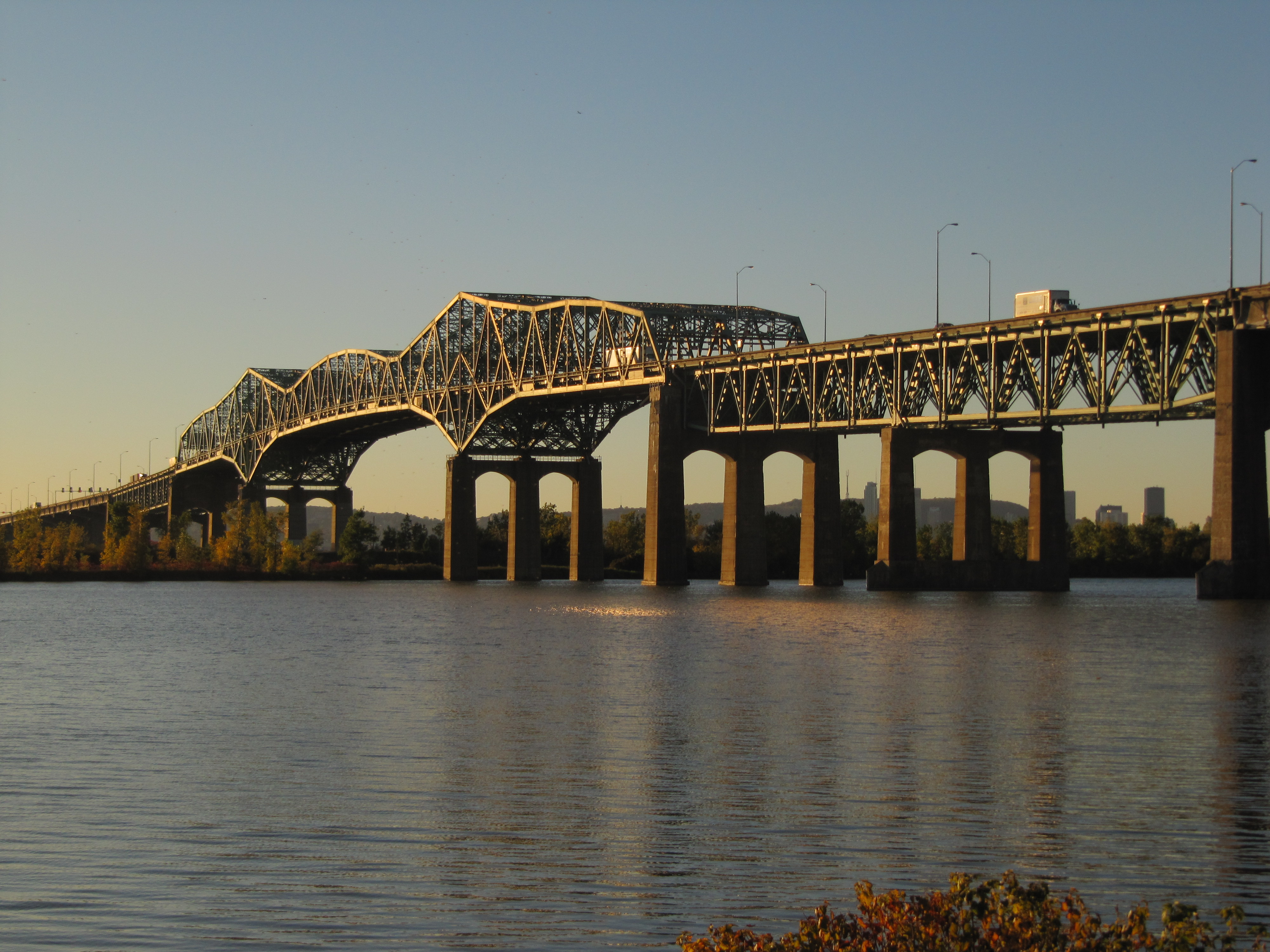
- Champlain Bridge in October 2010
- Coordinates: 45°28′07″N 73°31′03″W
- Carried: Six lanes of Autoroute 10, 15, 20
- Crossed: St. Lawrence River and Saint Lawrence Seaway
- Locale: Brossard and Montreal, Quebec, Canada
- Owner: The Jacques Cartier and Champlain Bridges Inc.
- Maintained by: The Jacques Cartier and Champlain Bridges Inc.
- Website: jacquescartierchamplain.ca?lang=en

Characteristics
- Design: Steel truss Cantilever bridge
- Material: Steel, Concrete
- Total length: 3,440 m (11,286 ft); 7,412 m (24,318 ft) (including approaches)
- Longest span: 215.5 m (707.02 ft)
- Clearance below: 36.6 m (120 ft) at mid-span
- No. of lanes: 6

History
- Designer: Philip Louis Pratley; Henry Hugh Lewis Pratley
- Engineering design by: Philippe Ewart; Lalonde and Valois
- Constructed by: Atlas Construction Company Limited; McNamara (Quebec) Limited; The Key Construction Inc. Deschamps & Bélanger Limitée; Dominion Bridge Company
- Construction start: 1957
- Construction end: 1962
- Construction cost: C$35 million C$52 million (including approaches and Bonaventure Expressway)
- Opened: June 28, 1962
- Closed: June 28, 2019
- Demolished: 2019-2024

Statistics
- Daily traffic: 159,000
- Toll: Collected until 1990

Location
- Location on a map of Montreal

The Champlain Bridge (French: Pont Champlain) was a steel truss cantilever bridge with approach viaducts constructed of prestressed concrete beams supporting a prestressed concrete deck paved with asphalt. Opened in 1962, the bridge crossed the Saint Lawrence River, connecting the Island of Montreal to its South Shore suburbs.

Together with the Jacques Cartier Bridge, it was administered by the Jacques Cartier and Champlain Bridges Incorporated (JCCBI), a Canadian Crown Corporation which reports to Housing, Infrastructure and Communities Canada. Since December 21, 1978, JCCBI was responsible for the management, maintenance and monitoring of the Champlain Bridge.

The bridge saw about 50 million crossings per year, of which 200,000 were buses. On an average weekday, 66% of users were commuters. It was one of the busiest bridges in Canada until its closure in 2019.

Towards the end of its life, the Champlain Bridge was well known to be in an advanced state of decay. Long-discussed plans to construct a replacement bridge finally came to fruition when construction commenced in 2015. In 2019, upon the opening of the new bridge (formally known as the Samuel-De Champlain Bridge), the original Champlain Bridge was closed and promptly demolished, concluding 57 years of service.

== Specifications ==
The Champlain Bridge project was undertaken in 1955 and construction proceeded between 1957 and 1962. The bridge carried six lanes of vehicle traffic; three in each direction. During rush hour one lane of those heading off the island in the morning, and onto the island in the evening, was used as a reserved bus lane for buses to be able to head in the opposite direction. The bridge was opened to traffic in stages as the approaches were completed between June 1962 and September 1964. It was subsequently connected to the Bonaventure Expressway, which was part of the north approach to the bridge. The expressway was opened to traffic on April 21, 1967. It was one of North America's busiest highways with almost 59 million crossings annually.

- Total length of crossing complex: 14.5 km (9 mi)
- Total bridge length including approaches: 7,412 m (24,318 ft)
  - Length: abutment to abutment: 3,440 m (11,290 ft)
  - Link of viaduct to Section 1: 2,195 m (7,201 ft)
  - Center main cantilevered span: 215 m (705 ft)
  - Wellington Street approach: 365 m (1,198 ft)
- Bonaventure Expressway: 4,573 m (15,003 ft)

Just upstream from the bridge there is an ice boom, the Champlain Bridge Ice Control Structure.

== Construction history ==
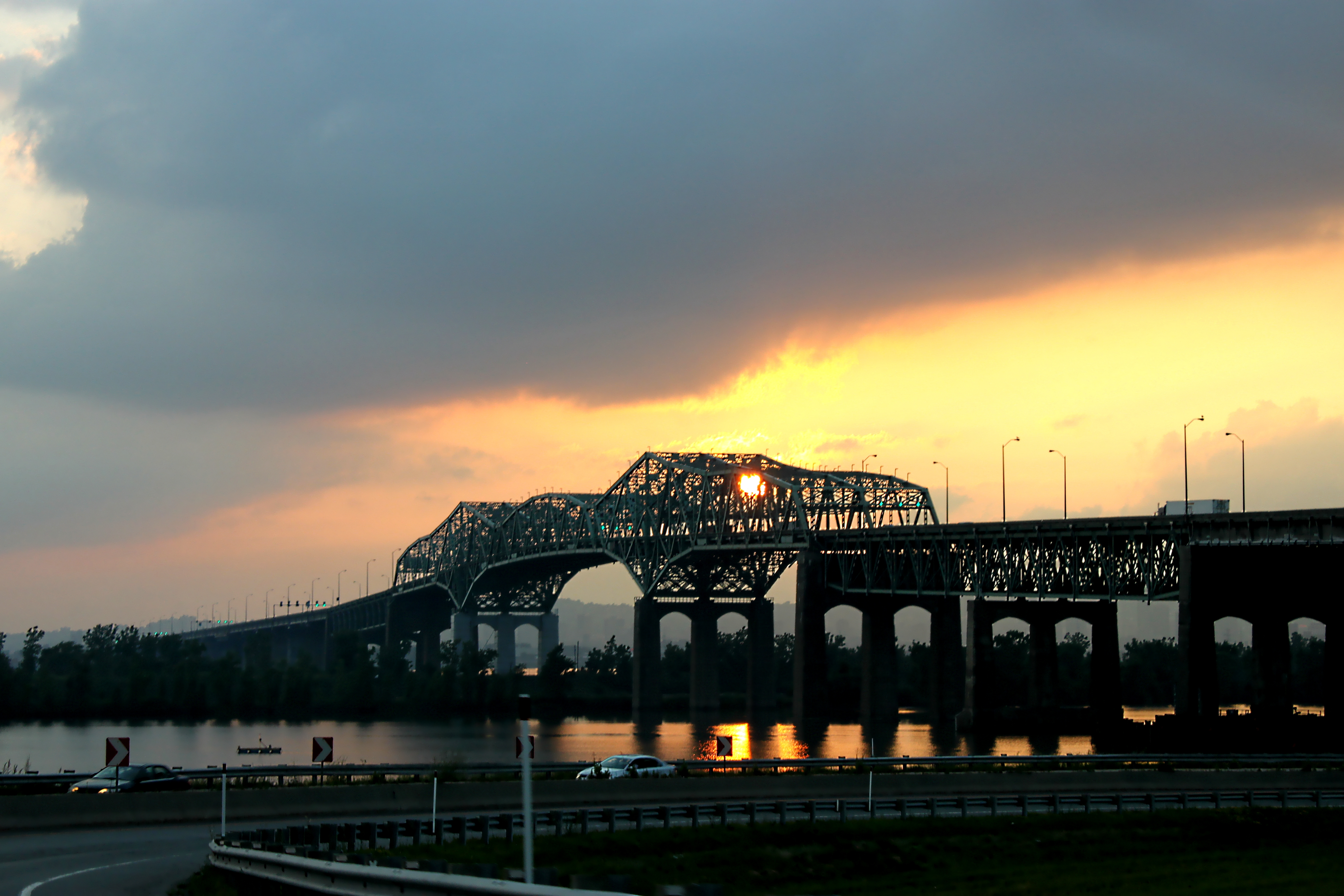
View from the east side of the Saint Lawrence River, July 2011

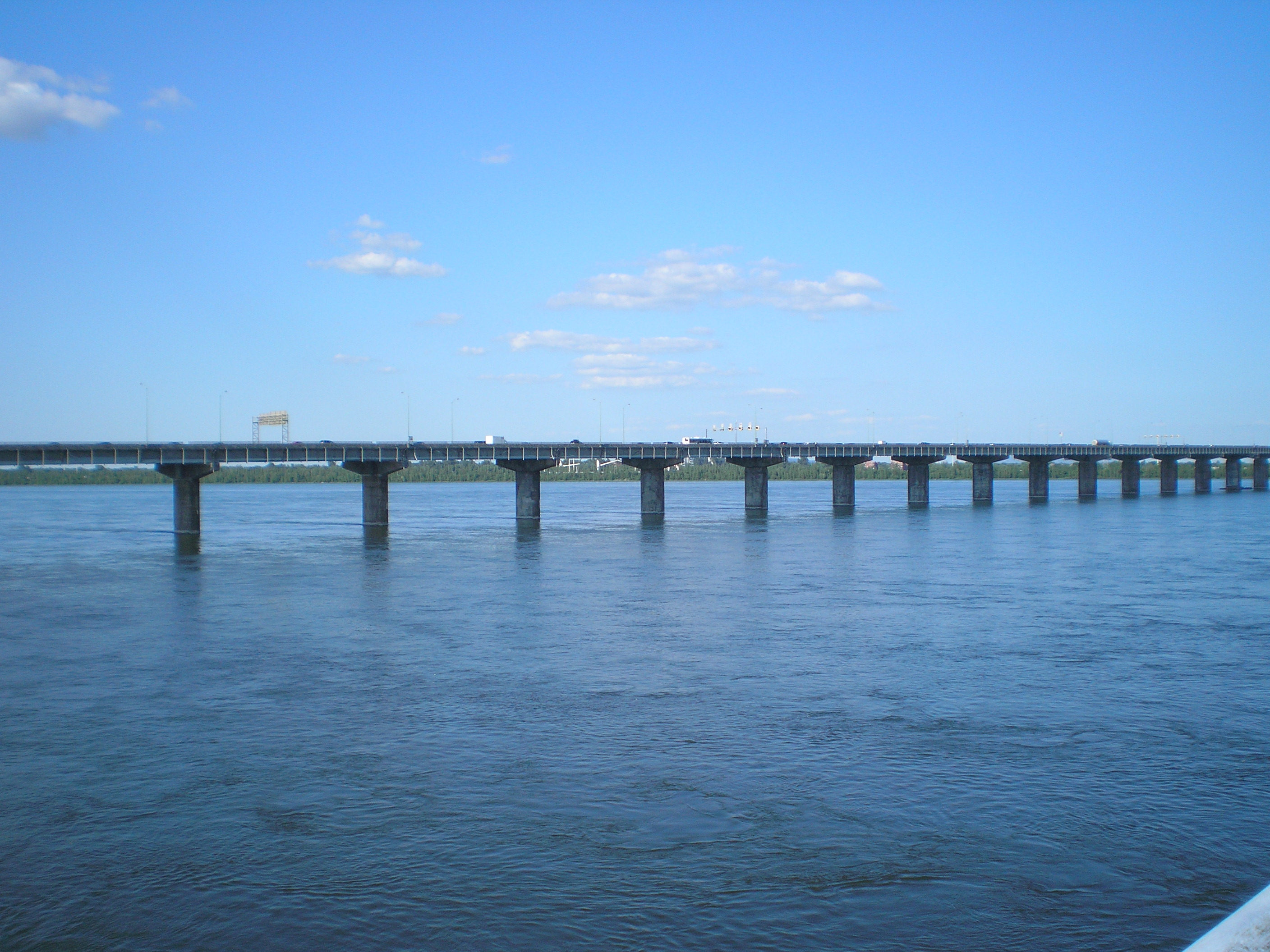
The concrete span on the west side of the Saint Lawrence River

On August 17, 1955, Federal Transport Minister George Marler announced the planned construction of a new bridge connecting Montreal to the South Shore via Nun's Island. The city's existing bridges (Victoria, Cartier, and Mercier) had become inadequate to support the amount of traffic that carried residents from the growing South Shore suburbs into Montreal.

The project was initially called the Nuns' Island Bridge because it crosses Nuns' Island. In 1958, it was named the Champlain Bridge in honour of the explorer Samuel de Champlain.

The National Harbours Board was placed in charge of the project. Through several lengthy meetings and consultations in the fall of 1955, the location for the bridge and its approaches were selected. Originally, the plan had been to build the bridge with only 4 lanes, with room for further expansion to 6 lanes. During the design phase, however, it was decided to go with an initial 6-lane design.

It was opened on June 28, 1962 at 4 p.m. with only one approach from Montreal, via Wellington Street. A section including approaches to and from Atwater Street and La Vérendrye Boulevard were opened two years later.

In 1967, the final approach to the bridge on the Montréal side was completed when the Bonaventure Expressway was opened to traffic.

A $0.25 toll ($0.08 if paid with tokens) was charged to finance the $35 million cost of the Champlain Bridge. The toll was collected until 1990, when the Jacques Cartier and Champlain Bridges Incorporated (JCCBI), which took over jurisdiction of the bridge a dozen years earlier, removed the toll plaza.

In 1992, the concrete deck of the cantilever metal part was replaced by an orthotropic steel deck. Gutters to channel the corrosive runoff to the river appeared in 1994. The pressure exerted by the reinforced beams on the ends of the trimmers then required the reinforcement of the latter by steel rods under tension.

In November 2013, a crack was discovered in a critical part of the superstructure. One lane was closed immediately, and emergency repair plans were put in place. During preparation, the crack enlarged and a second lane was closed. On November 29, 2013, a temporary external beam of 75 tons, named "super-beam" by the media, was urgently installed to reinforce the structure. In June 2014, JCCBI replaced the super-beam with a modular truss that was designed and manufactured in Quebec.

Starting October 2016, deemed the structure being weak to maintain, heavy trucks weighing over 66 tonnes are banned from using the bridge, until the new bridge replaces it.

As part of a 2014–2017 Edge girder reinforcement program, 94 modular trusses and six shoring systems were installed to stabilize the condition of the bridge girders.

== Problems and replacement ==
Montreal's climate subjected the Champlain Bridge to wintry cold, snowfall, and windy conditions, as well as contrasting hot and humid summer conditions, all of which accelerated damage to the bridge. Because of the potential danger from ice accumulation during winter, the bridge was salted every season for decades. Salt attacks both the concrete and steel rebar used in girders, pylons, and other parts. The problems associated with the design and maintenance of the Champlain Bridge thus exceeded the useful life of several structural components. The design and construction of the structure prevented the isolation of outdated elements and their replacement with new ones, as could be done on other structures. Given the advanced deterioration of the bridge, it was constantly monitored by 300 sensors.

Several reinforcement measures and rehabilitation programs were deployed over time by JCCBI. However, none of these were effective in the long term.

In 2009, the Government of Canada announced in its 2009 Economic Action Plan that it would be allocating $212 million to renew the bridge. In March 2011, the Government of Canada announced $158 million were to be spent on a major repair and maintenance program as concerns mounted that it was at risk of collapse. Montreal's La Presse newspaper cited two leaked engineering reports prepared for a federal bridge agency that suggested sections of the structure were in a severe state of deterioration. The report concluded that a partial or complete collapse of the span could not be ruled out.

Starting in 2009, JCCBI — the Federal agency that managed the structure — began conducting a major repair program to extend the useful life of the Champlain Bridge. In 2010, JCCBI retained international engineering firm Delcan to carry out an expert study of the bridge's structural health. The firm returned a report entitled "The Future of the Champlain Bridge Crossing". In the Executive Summary, the bridge was said to be "functionally deficient" for both current and long-term traffic demands, and showing "significant deterioration". One finding suggested that the Champlain Bridge was in "very much poorer condition than would be typical" for comparable bridges. Delcan concluded that the bridge had "many deficiencies" and, even in light of the methodical inspection and rehabilitation of the structure undertaken by its owners, that continued operation "entails some risks that cannot altogether be quantified".

In September 2007, faced with rising costs for the maintenance of the Champlain Bridge, then Canadian Minister of Transport Lawrence Cannon confirmed that his department was seriously considering the construction of a replacement structure. In August 2008, Transport Canada announced that it was exploring different scenarios for a new bridge. In October 2011, then Minister of Transport Denis Lebel officially announced that construction on the new bridge would begin within 10 years.

In April 2015, the federal government selected the JV consortium: Signature on the St. Lawrence Group to build the new bridge. The consortium mainly included SNC-Lavalin, the Spanish ACS Infrastructure, and Dragados Canada. T.Y. Lin International served as the Lead Designer.

Construction on the new bridge officially began on June 16, 2015. On December 19, 2018, Minister of Infrastructure and Communities François-Philippe Champagne announced that the official name of the new bridge would be the Samuel-de-Champlain Bridge. The bridge opened to northbound/westbound traffic on June 24, 2019 (St-Jean-Baptiste Day), with the official opening ceremony being held on June 28, 2019, and southbound/eastbound traffic opening on 1 July 2019 (Canada Day). The multi-purpose runway was opened in November 2019 followed by the REM train tracks on July 31, 2023.

As soon as the new bridge was opened to traffic, the old bridge was closed and demolition work began immediately.

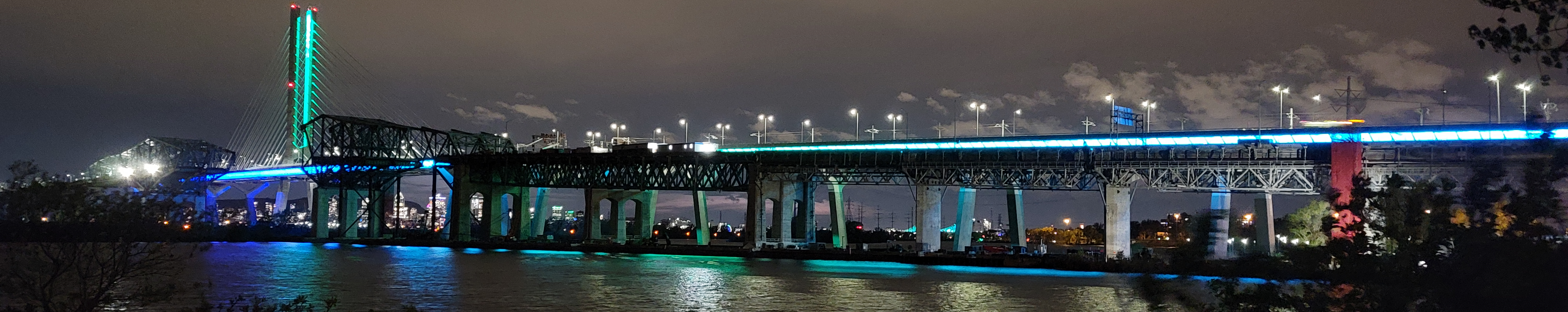
The cable-stayed Samuel de Champlain bridge (background) illuminated at night, with the old truss cantilever bridge (foreground) being dismantled, May 2022.

== See also ==
- List of longest bridges in the world
- List of bridges
- List of crossings of the Saint Lawrence River
- List of bridges in Montreal
- Federal Bridge Corporation Limited
- Réseau express métropolitain
