= Beaconsfield High School (Quebec) =

Location
- 250 Beaurepaire Drive; Beaconsfield, Quebec, H9W 5G7; Canada; 45°25′45″N 73°51′45″W

Information
- School type: High school
- Founded: 1958
- School board: Lester B. Pearson School Board
- Principal: Elaine Fraser
- Grades: Secondary I–V
- Enrollment: 900
- Language: English, French
- Colours: Dark Blue, White
- Mascot: Bison

Beaconsfield High School (commonly referred to as Beaconsfield High or BHS) is a secondary school located in the Montreal area suburb of Beaconsfield, Quebec, Canada. Beaconsfield High is part of The Lester B. Pearson School Board. Previously, it was considered to be the flagship high school of the now defunct Lakeshore School Board.

First opened in 1958, and renovated and expanded in the 1970s adding a second gymnasium, theatre, and a new cafeteria, library and two new wings, Beaconsfield High School is currently home to more than 600 students. According to the school's website, BHS has "traditionally served the communities of Beaconsfield, Baie d'Urfe, Kirkland and Pointe-Claire. Students from the communities of Ste. Anne de Bellevue, Ile Perrot and Pincourt are now increasingly part of the school population. A high proportion of graduating students goes on to attend CEGEP."

Beaconsfield High School also offers strong academic French immersion and regular English programs at all levels, as well as an alternative program known as Embarkations, which is renowned for its successes with disenfranchised youth that started in 1992.. Beaconsfield High School gives students access to a large variety of sports and e-sports. The school also offers many different after-school clubs including but not limited to the "Dungeons and Dragons" club, the math club, and the manga club.

== Arts ==
Beaconsfield Highschool offers 5 main art programs; Art, Creative Movement, Drama, Musicand Robotics. The senior Drama class known as "Drama Workshop" being the only mixed-year class in the school with a blend of Secondary IV and Secondary V students.

== Notable alumni ==
- Mark Montreuil, former NFL defensive back for the San Diego Chargers.
- Asexuals, Beaconsfield-based hardcore punk band with founding members, Sean Friesen, TJ Collins and Paul Remington all attending Beaconsfield High School.
- Dafydd Williams, Canadian Canadian Space Agency astronaut who set a Canadian record for number of spacewalks .
- Glen Murray, Former mayor of Winnipeg.
- Cas Anvar, Iranian-Canadian actor.
- Andrew Walker, Actor.
- Greg Kelley (politician), Member of the Quebec Liberal Party.
- Kent Hughes, General Manager of the Montreal Canadiens since 2022.
- Geoffrey Kelley, Member of the Quebec Liberal Party.
- Stephen Toope, CEO of Canadian Institute for Advanced Research, Former Vice Chancellor of the University of Cambridge, 2nd Director of the Munk School of Global Affairs & Public Policy, and 12th President of the University of British Columbia.
- Mark Kelley, CBC News journalist.
- Carolyn Waldo, Medalist synchronized swimmer representing Canada at the 1988 Summer Olympics and the 1984 Summer Olympic games in Seoul and Los Angeles.
