= Gregory Kelly =

Gregory or Greg Kelly may refer to:

- Gregory Kelly (bishop) (born 1956), American Catholic bishop
- Gregory Kelly (actor) (1892–1927), American stage actor
- Greg Kelly (born 1968), American television journalist
- Greg Kelly (Coronation Street), fictional character from the British soap opera Coronation Street

== See also ==
- Gregory Kelley, American figure skater
- Greg Kelley (politician), Canadian politician
- Greg Kelley, American high school football player wrongly convicted of child sexual abuse covered in the miniseries Outcry
