= Urfé =

Urfé or Urfe may refer to:

== People ==
- François-Saturnin Lascaris d'Urfé (1641–1701), French Sulpician priest in Baie-d'Urfé, Quebec, Canada
- Honoré d'Urfé (1568–1625), French novelist
- José Urfé (1879–1957), Cuban clarinetist and composer

== Other uses ==
- Urfe (album) by British industrial black metal band The Axis of Perdition.
- Baie-D'Urfé, Quebec, Canada
- Nicholas Urfe, the main character in the novel The Magus

== See also ==
- Urfa (disambiguation)
