= Greg Kelley =

Greg Kelley may refer to:

- Greg Kelley, American high school football player wrongly convicted of child sexual abuse covered in the miniseries Outcry
- Greg Kelley (politician), Canadian politician
- Gregory Kelley, American figure skater

== See also ==
- Greg Kelly (born 1968), American television journalist
- Greg Kelly (Coronation Street), fictional character from the British soap opera Coronation Street
