= 1916 Quebec general election =

Canadian provincial election

← 1912	May 22, 1916	1919 →

81 seats in the 14th Legislative Assembly of Quebec 41 seats were needed for a majority
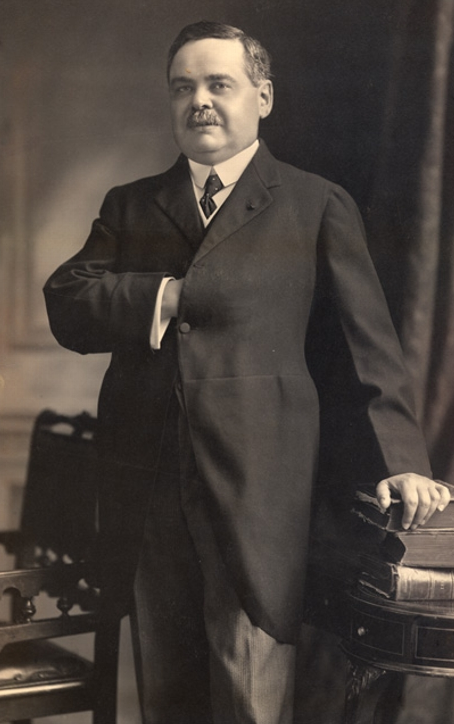

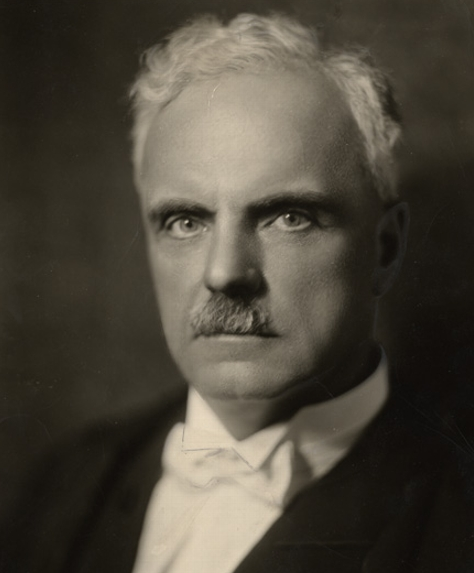
	First party	Second party
Leader	Lomer Gouin	Philémon Cousineau
Party	Liberal	Conservative
Leader since	1905	1915
Leader's seat	Portneuf	Jacques-Cartier (lost re-election)
Last election	62 seats, 53.54%	16 seats, 43.01%
Seats won	75	6
Seat change	▲13	▼10
Popular vote	126,266	73,147
Percentage	60.57%	35.09%
Swing	▲7.03pp	▼7.92pp
Premier before election
Lomer Gouin
Liberal
Premier after election
Lomer Gouin
Liberal

The 1916 Quebec general election was held on May 22, 1916, to elect members of the 14th Legislative Assembly of the Province of Quebec, Canada. The incumbent Quebec Liberal Party, led by Lomer Gouin, was re-elected, defeating the Quebec Conservative Party, led by Philémon Cousineau.

The turnout was 43.46%.

== Results ==
Party	Party leader	# of candidates	Seats			Popular Vote		
Party	Party leader	# of candidates	1912	Elected	% Change	#	%	% Change
Liberal	Lomer Gouin	85	62	75	+19.0%	126,266	60.57%	+7.03%
Conservative	Philémon Cousineau	55	16	6	-62.5%	73,147	35.09%	-7.92%
Parti ouvrier		2	-	1		9,039	4.34%	+0.9%
Other		0	1	-	-100%	9,039	4.34%	+0.9%
Total		142	81	81	-%	208,452	100%	

Popular vote
PLQ	60.57%
PCQ	35.09%
Others	4.34%

Seats summary
PLQ	91.46%
PCQ	7.32%
Others	1.22%

== See also ==
- List of Quebec premiers
- Politics of Quebec
- Timeline of Quebec history
- List of Quebec political parties
- 14th Legislative Assembly of Quebec
