= Beaconsfield, Quebec =

Beaconsfield
- City
- City of Beaconsfield; Ville de Beaconsfield (French)
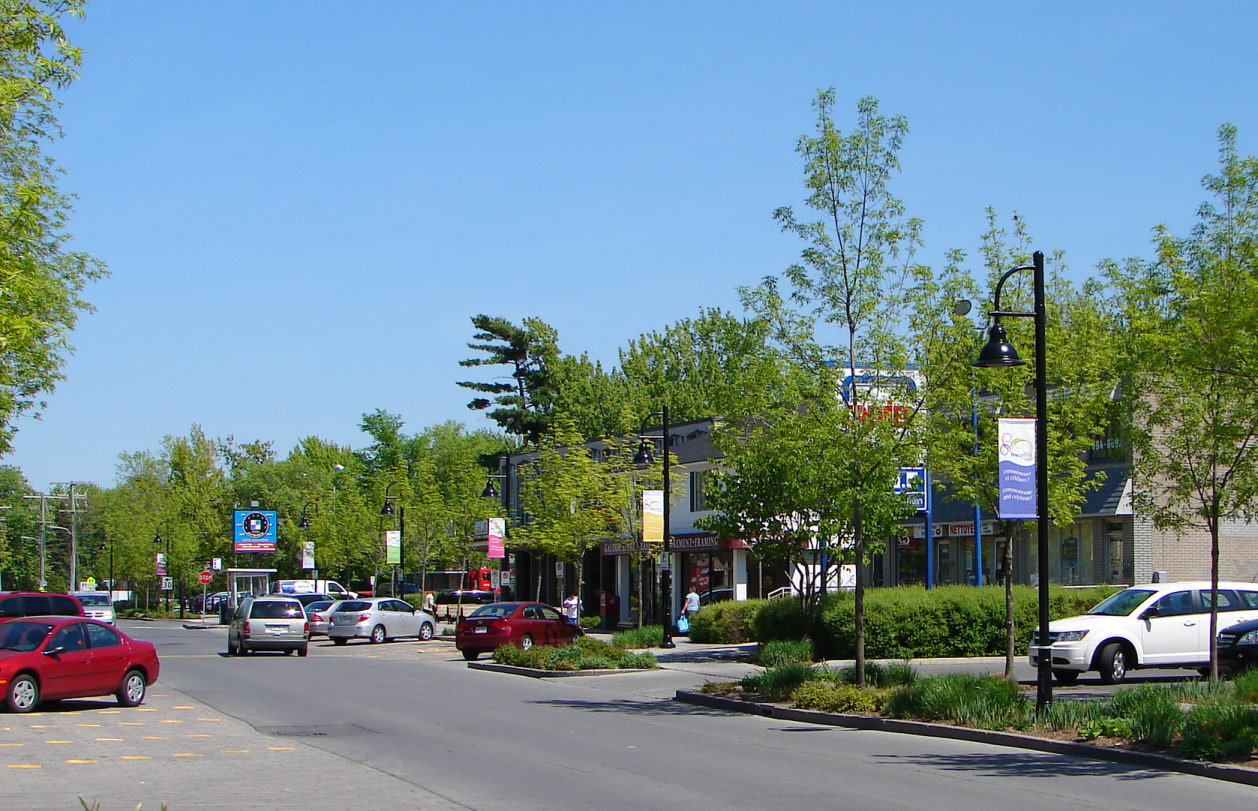
- Beaurepaire Village

- Coat of arms
- Motto: Forti Nihil Difficile ("Nothing is Difficult to the Brave")
- Location on the Island of Montreal

- Location in southern Quebec
- Coordinates: 45°26′N 73°52′W
- Country: Canada
- Province: Quebec
- Region: Montréal
- RCM: None
- Settled: 1698
- Founded: June 30, 1910
- City: March 19, 1966
- Merged into Montréal: January 1, 2002
- Reconstituted: January 1, 2006

Government
  - Mayor: Martin St-Jean
  - Federal riding: Lac-Saint-Louis
  - Prov. riding: Jacques-Cartier

Area
  - Total: 24.40 km^{2} (9.42 sq mi)
  - Land: 11.03 km^{2} (4.26 sq mi)

Population (2021)
  - Total: 19,277
  - Density: 1,747.5/km^{2} (4,526/sq mi)
  - Pop 2016-2021: ▼0.2%
  - Dwellings: 6,915
- Time zone: UTC−5 (EST)
  - Summer (DST): UTC−4 (EDT)
- Postal code(s): H9W
- Area codes: 514 and 438
- Highways: A-20 (TCH)
- Website: www.beaconsfield.ca

Beaconsfield is a suburb on the Island of Montreal, Quebec, Canada, part of the Greater Montreal region locally referred to as the West Island. It is a residential community located on the north shore of Lac Saint-Louis, bordered on the west by Baie-D'Urfé, north by Kirkland and east by Pointe-Claire.

Incorporated in 1910, named in honour of Benjamin Disraeli, Earl of Beaconsfield, Prime Minister of the United Kingdom and close confidant of Queen Victoria, the city's historical roots go back as far as 1698. Beaconsfield, in its current form, was developed as a cottage community by affluent Montreal residents. Over the decades, the city has transformed from summer homes, to year-round residents, and has flourished.

The population of Beaconsfield, as of the Canada 2021 Census, is 19,277. While the population is predominantly anglophone, 77% of residents speak both official languages of Canada. Most residents live in single-family homes, though there are residents of townhouses and apartment buildings.

== History ==
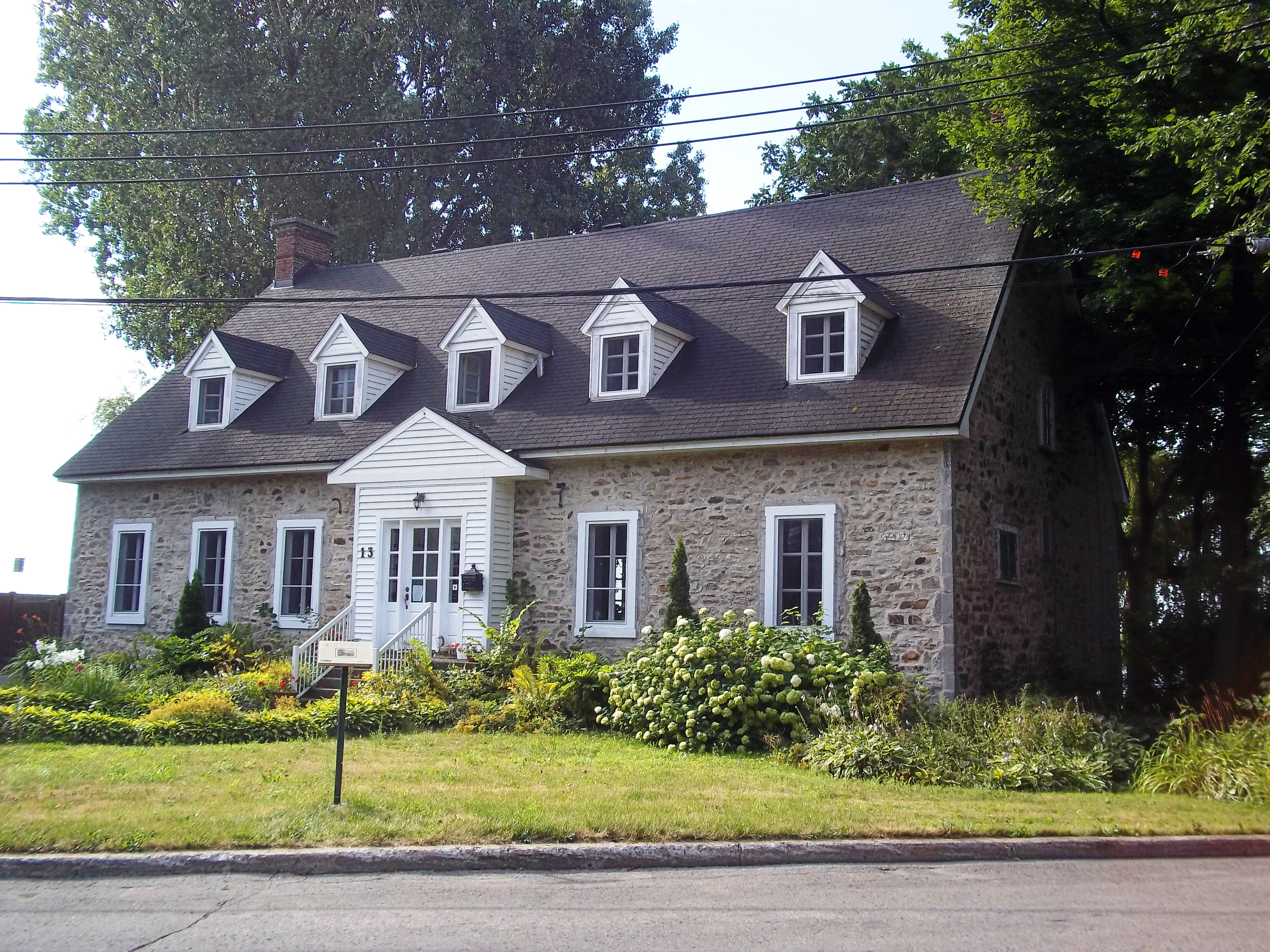
Maison Beaurepaire, house built circa 1765 on the location of the first concession of Jean Guenet

In 1678, the Sulpician Order, who owned the Island of Montreal at the time, granted the first concession in this area to Jean Guenet, one of the main merchants of Ville-Marie and tax collector for the island's Seigneurs. Guenet named his concession, located at Pointe Beaurepaire or Thompson Point but now known as Pointe à Quenet, "Beau Repaire". Following the Great Peace of Montreal Treaty in 1701, permanent settlement began that led to farming communities along Lake Saint-Louis.

In 1713, the Parish of St-Joachim de la Pointe Claire was created, which included the present territory of the cities of Beaconsfield, Kirkland and Pointe-Claire.

In 1855, the Grand Trunk Railway was built through the area, and the Canadian Pacific Railway in the 1880s. These brought summer residents from Montreal and the pioneer farming settlement began to transform to a summer cottage resort.

The name Beaconsfield is first attributed to John Henry Menzies who in 1870 bought a country estate then known as "Le Bocage" (originally built by Paul Urgèle Gabriel Valois in 1810). He renamed it in 1877 after Benjamin Disraeli, 1st Earl of Beaconsfield, who was his friend. In time, this name was also used for its train station (which opened in 1879), golf club (opened in 1902), and the Post Office (opened in 1904).

The City (Ville) of Beaconsfield was formed on June 30, 1910, when it split off from the Parish of Saint-Joachim de la Pointe-Claire. In the census of 1911, it had 375 persons, 60 families living in 60 houses. It grew slowly to 990 inhabitants by 1951. During the 1950s and 1960s, Beaconsfield rapidly developed as a residential suburb. By 1966, the last original farm concession began to be developed for residences.

On March 19, 1966, Beaconsfield changed statutes from Ville to Cité ("city"), but on September 18, 1982, this was reverted.

As part of the 2002–2006 municipal reorganization of Montreal Beaconsfield and neighbouring Baie-D'Urfé became the borough of Beaconsfield–Baie-D'Urfé and were merged into the city of Montreal. After a change of government, and the 2004 referendum, both Baie-D'Urfé and Beaconsfield voted to de-merge from Montreal. On January 1, 2006, they were reconstituted as independent municipalities. They still remain part of the urban agglomeration of Montreal.

=== Homicides ===
Spanning the decade between 1995 and 2006 multiple homicides and murder-suicides took place inside homes that were all within 0.5 km (500 yd) of each other.

- April 1995, Frank Toope, a retired Anglican minister, and his wife Jocelyn were bludgeoned to death during a botched robbery by three youths — aged 13, 14 and 15. All three youths have since reoffended as adults.
- May 2001, Margareth and Ed Fertuck were killed by their son, who died by suicide after the event.
- September 2001, John Bauer shot and killed his wife Helen, their three sons, Jonathan, Wesley and Justin, father-in-law Elmer Carroll and business partner Lucio Beccherini, over a three-day span before taking his own life after setting his house on fire. Their home was located on a street bordering Beaconsfield and Kirkland.
- October 2006, psychologist Dragolub Tzokovitch shot and killed his wife Mila Voynova, and two daughters, Iva and Alice, before taking his own life.

== Demographics ==
Historical populations
Year	Pop.	±%
1911	375	—
1921	578	+54.1%
1931	641	+10.9%
1941	706	+10.1%
1951	1,888	+167.4%
1956	5,496	+191.1%
1961	10,064	+83.1%
1966	15,702	+56.0%
1971	19,389	+23.5%
1976	20,417	+5.3%
1981	19,613	−3.9%
1986	19,301	−1.6%
1991	19,616	+1.6%
1996	19,414	−1.0%
2001	19,310	−0.5%
2006	19,194	−0.6%
2011	19,505	+1.6%
2016	19,324	−0.9%
2021	19,277	−0.2%
Source: Statistics Canada

According to the Office québécois de la langue française, Beaconsfield has been officially recognized as a bilingual municipality since 2005-11-02.

In the 2021 Census of Population conducted by Statistics Canada, Beaconsfield had a population of 19,277 living in 6,753 of its 6,915 total private dwellings, a change of −0.2% from its 2016 population of 19,324. With a land area of 11.03 km^{2} (4.26 sq mi), it had a population density of 1,747.7/km^{2} (4,526.5/sq mi) in 2021.

Canada census – Beaconsfield community profile

	2021	2016	2011
Population	19,277 (-0.2% from 2016)	19,324 (-0.9% from 2011)	19,505 (+1.6% from 2006)
Land area	11.03 km^{2} (4.26 sq mi)	11.03 km^{2} (4.26 sq mi)	11.01 km^{2} (4.25 sq mi)
Population density	1,747.5/km^{2} (4,526/sq mi)	1,752.6/km^{2} (4,539/sq mi)	1,771.6/km^{2} (4,588/sq mi)
Median age	44.8 (M: 44.0, F: 45.6)	44.8 (M: 44.2, F: 45.2)	43.5 (M: 43.2, F: 43.8)
Private dwellings	6,915 (total) 6,753 (occupied)	6,828 (total)	6,811 (total)
Median household income	$138,000	$123,392	$111,762

References: 2021 2016 2011

Home language (2021)
Language	Population	Percentage (%)
English	12,420	65%
French	3,180	17%
Other	2,330	12%

Mother tongue (2021)
Language	Population	Percentage (%)
English	9,390	49%
French	4,050	21%
Other	4,495	24%

Visible minorities (2021)
Ethnicity	Population	Percentage (%)
Not a visible minority	15,290	80.3%
Visible minorities	3,745	19.7%

== Economy ==
Local businesses:

- Centre commercial Beaconsfield
- Plaza Beaconsfield
- Beaurepaire Village
- Plaza Elm

== Attractions ==
=== Parks and open spaces ===
- Beaconsfield Dog Park, near Angell Woods.
- Angell Woods, a large old growth forest.

Angell Woods

- Christmas Park: baseball, tennis, and basketball during the summer and a hockey rink in the winter.
- Windermere Park: Soccer, baseball, tennis, and basketball during the summer and a skating rink in the winter.
- Centennial Beach: dog friendly
- Centennial Park
- Mouse Park
- Saint James Park
- Drummond
- Beacon Hill Park: baseball, tennis, and swimming during the summer and a hockey rink and sledding hill in the winter.
- City Lane Park
- Heights Park

=== Local landmarks ===
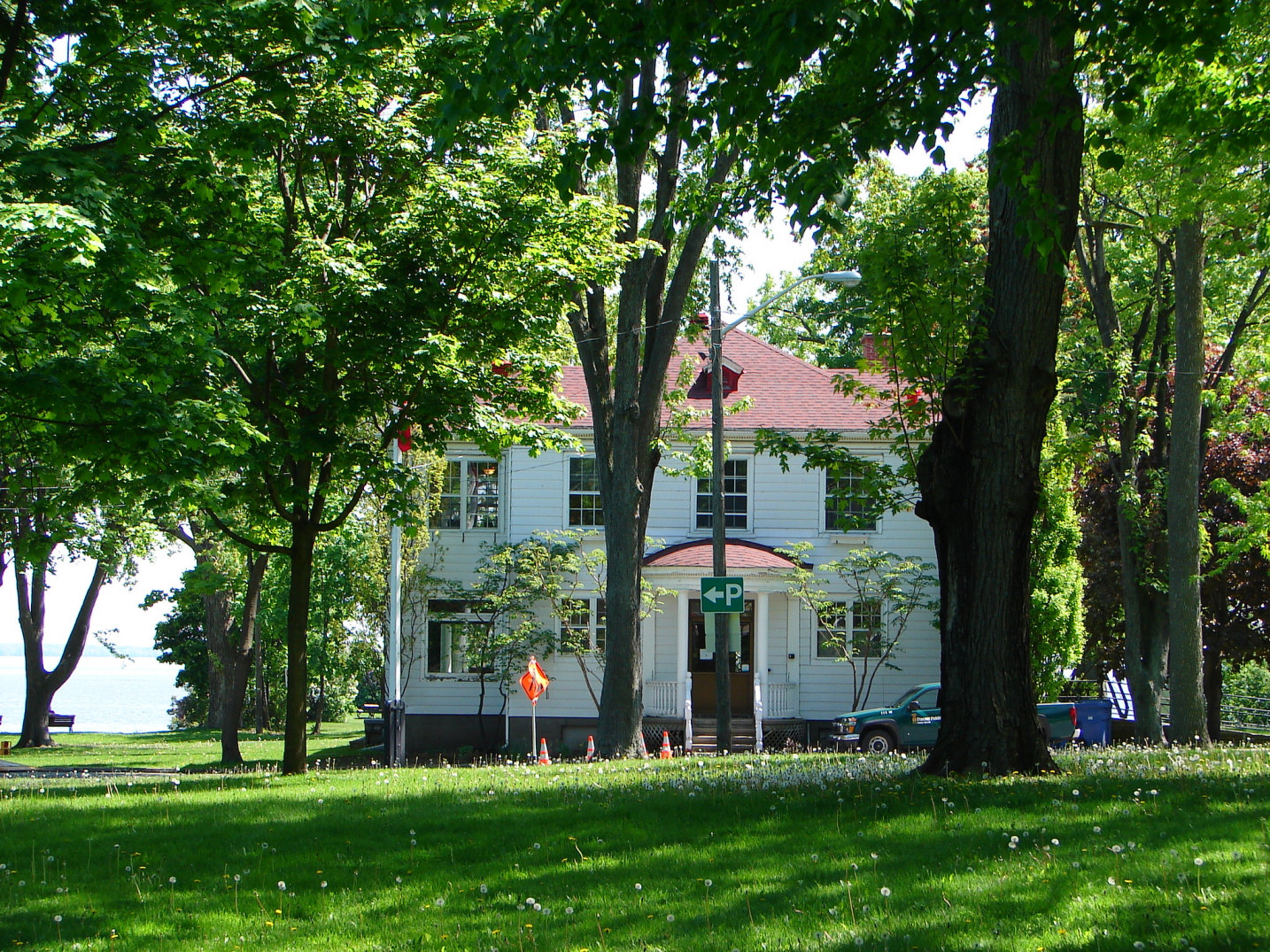
Centennial Hall community and cultural centre

- Village Beaurepaire, a commercial development in the heart of Beaconsfield which began in 1925 with the opening of a general store by Sidney Cunningham, the first president of the Beaconsfield Citizen's Association. Home to local bakeries, pubs, Marche Beaurepaire (a weekly farmers market), and shops.
- The historic cultural centre, Centennial Hall, where exhibitions and concerts take place.
- La Palette Art Gallery & Art School
- Beaconsfield United Church, the heart of Beaconsfield’s 2SLGBTQIA+ community.
- The Beaconsfield Library, with an extensive digital and print collection and excellent reference services. Established in 1951, the library was housed in a broom closet and bookmobile. Only in 1968 did it move to its present location thanks to the financial aid of City Council.
- Herb Linder Annex, a community centre and rental space attached to the library and City Hall.
- Heroes Park, honouring those who served.

=== Houses of Worship ===
- Faith Community Bible Church
- Briarwood Presbyterian Church, founded 1963
- Beaconsfield United Church
- St. Edmund of Canterbury Church, founded 1956
- Christ Church Beaurepaire
- Holy Trinity Ghanaian Methodist Church
- Iglesia Ni Christo

== Sports ==
Beaconsfield has a number of parks and athletic facilities

- The Recreation Centre, an indoor recreation complex, with a full-sized ice rink, semi-Olympic pool, gymnasium and youth centre. It is home to the Beaconsfield Bluefins, a competitive swim club that has trained athletes from beginner to national competition levels. It is also home to the Lakeshore Panthers, a Quebec minor hockey league, and the Beaconsfield Oldtimers Hockey Association.
- Two private yacht clubs on municipal land: Beaconsfield Yacht Club and Lord Reading Yacht Club.
- A number of neighbourhood parks, playgrounds, and playing fields, including numerous soccer fields, outdoor ice rinks, and baseball fields. Beaconsfield is part of the Lakeshore league, which has sports teams that include hockey, baseball, soccer, football, and tennis.
- The Beaconsfield Rugby Football Club which is a member of the Fédération de Rugby du Québec (FRQ).
- Four community pools that offer swim lessons and public swimming.
- West Island Heritage Bicycle Trail
- Elm Ave Bike Path
- Skate park located at the Beaconsfield Recreation Centre
- A lawn bowling green behind Herb Linder Annex.
- Beaconsfield lies on the shores of Lac St-Louis and offers many access points for non-motorized watercraft as well as first-come-first serve non-motorized watercraft storage at these sites. Swimming is prohibited at all times in these waters. These are the locations for storage and access:
  - Corner of Angell and Lakeshore
  - Corner of Lakeview and Lakeshore
  - Corner of St-Louis and Lakeshore

== Government ==
Beaconsfield's local government consists of a mayor and six city councillors, each elected to represent one of the city's wards. The former mayor of Beaconsfield was Georges Bourelle, who had held the office from 2013 until the 2025 municipal election. Following the city's 2025 Municipal Election, the council consists of Mayor Martin St Jean and the following six councillors:

- District 1 - Dominique Godin
- District 2 - Marie Léveillé
- District 3 - Robert Mercuri
- District 4 - David Newell
- District 5 - Jason Rossie
- District 6 - Tim Quinn

=== List of former mayors ===
List of former mayors:

- Joseph Léonide Perron (1910–1916)
- George W. Crowdy (1916–1918)
- James S. Brierley (1918–1928)
- James William Shaw (1928–1936)
- Hugh Charles Hillrich (1936–1940)
- Stanislauz Z.-J. Paquin (1940–1942)
- Louis Émile Côté (1942–1948)
- John E. H. Stethem (1948–1950, 1952–1956)
- Llewelyn Paerry (1950–1952)
- R. S. Turnham (1956–1959)
- R. M. Gibb (1959–1960)
- Edwin M. Briggs (1960–1982)
- Patricia M. Rustad (1982–1990)
- Roy Kemp (1990–2003)
- Anne-Marie Parent (2003)
- Ann Myles (2003–2005)
- Bob Benedetti (2005–2009)
- David Pollock (2009–2013)
- Georges Bourelle (2013–2025)

== Infrastructure ==
=== Transportation ===
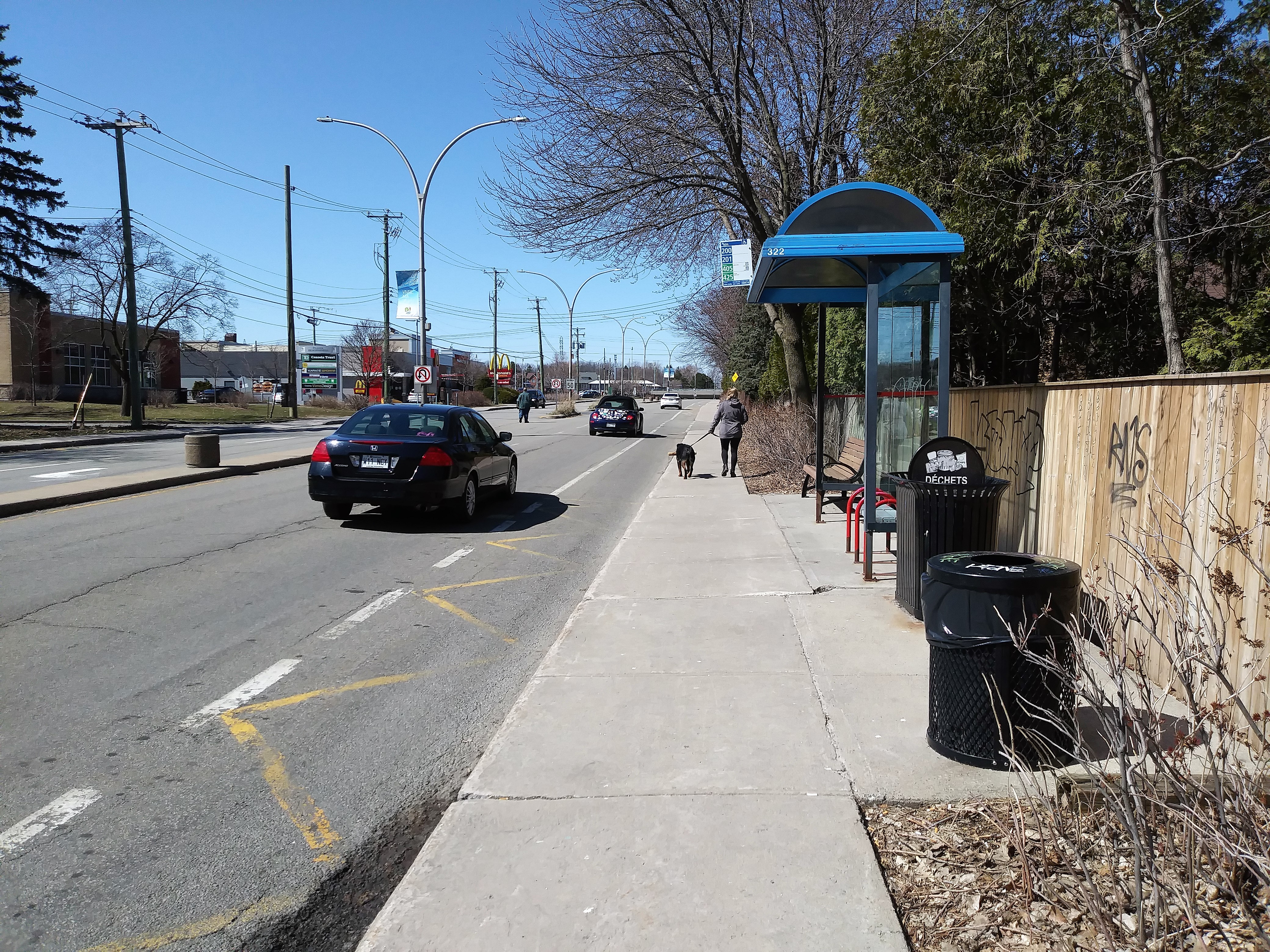
Boulevard Saint-Charles

Beaconsfield is served by the Réseau de transport métropolitain (RTM) train system, with two stations, Beaconsfield and Beaurepaire, on the Vaudreuil-Hudson line which ends in downtown Montreal. The city is also served by Société de transport de Montréal (STM) bus lines 200, 201, 211, 217, 221, 354, 361, 382, 401, 405, 411, and 425. The Kirkland Réseau express métropolitain (REM) station is located a short distance from northwestern Beaconsfield, on the north side of Autoroute 40.

Beaconsfield is served directly by one major highway, Highway 20 (Autoroute 20) with two exits in Beaconsfield, exit 45 at Avenue Woodland, and exit 48 at Boulevard St-Charles. Access to Beaconsfield is also possible from the Highway 40 (Autoroute 40), exit Boulevard St-Charles - south (Sud).

=== Animal protection ===
Beaconsfield Animal Services is enforced by the city's Municipal Patrol. A temporary holding pen is located at 303 A Beaconsfield Boulevard, a storage building behind Herb Linder Annex. Stray dogs are temporary held at 303 A Beaconsfield Boulevard and, if their owner cannot be found, are then brought to SPCA West, a no kill shelter.

Beaconsfield was listed as a PETA Certified Compassionate City in 2016 for its animal protection bylaws, and is listed on The FurBearers website as one of the Canadian municipalities that has a trapping-related bylaw.

== Education ==
Education in Beaconsfield, as common in the Montreal area, is operated by school boards divided linguistically. There is separate boards for instruction in English (Anglophone) and French (Francophone).

=== Francophone ===
The Centre de services scolaire Marguerite-Bourgeoys operates Francophone public schools, but were previously operated by the Commission scolaire Marguerite-Bourgeoys until June 15, 2020. The change was a result of a law passed by the Quebec government that changed the school board system from denominational to linguistic.

Francophone primary schools:

- École primaire Beaconsfield
- École primaire Saint-Rémi

Francophone special purpose school:

- École primaire et secondaire John F. Kennedy

=== Anglophone ===
The Lester B. Pearson School Board (LBPSB) operates Anglophone public schools in Beaconsfield.

Anglophone vocational Education:

- Gordon Robertson Centre

Anglophone adult Education:

- Place Cartier Adult Centre

Anglophone secondary schools:

- Beaconsfield High School

Anglophone primary schools:

- Beacon Hill Elementary School
- Christmas Park Elementary School
- St. Edmund Elementary School
- Sherbrooke Academy Junior & Senior Schools
- Clearpoint Elementary School in Pointe-Claire serves some portions

== Notable people ==
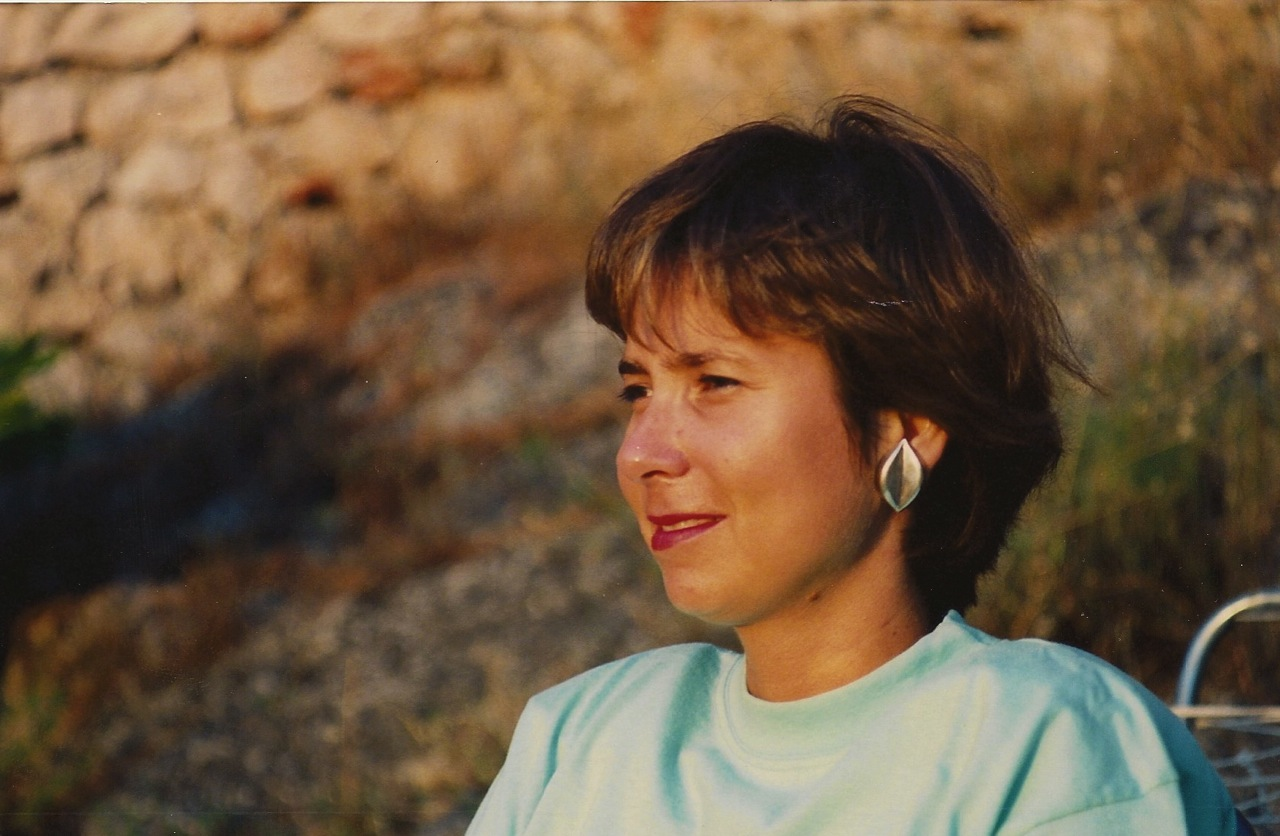
Madeline Aksich

- Madeline-Ann Aksich, philanthropist and Order of Canada recipient
- Alex Killorn, NHL player for the Tampa Bay Lightning and 2020 and 2021 Stanley Cup Champion, born in Halifax, Nova Scotia but raised in Beaconsfield.
- Don McGowan, television personality on CFCF-DT
- Marc-Édouard Vlasic (born 1987), NHL Player for the San Jose Sharks. Born in Pointe-Claire. Raised in Beaconsfield.

== See also ==
- List of anglophone communities in Quebec
- List of former boroughs of Montreal
- 2002–06 municipal reorganization of Montreal
- 2000–06 municipal reorganization in Quebec
- Beaconsfield High School (Beaconsfield)
