= Joseph-Séraphin-Aimé Ashby =

Canadian politician

Member of the Legislative Assembly of Quebec for Jacques-Cartier
- In office 1916–1923
- Preceded by: Philémon Cousineau
- Succeeded by: Esioff-Léon Patenaude

Personal details
- Born: April 29, 1876 Sainte-Marie-de-Monnoir, Quebec
- Died: March 5, 1962 (aged 85) Montreal, Quebec
- Party: Liberal

Joseph-Séraphin-Aimé Ashby (April 29, 1876 – March 5, 1962) was a Canadian politician in the province of Quebec.

Born in Sainte-Marie-de-Monnoir, Quebec, the son of George Ashby and Euphrosine Messier, Ashby was educated at the college of Sainte-Marie-de-Monnoir and the Université Laval at Montreal. He became a notary public in 1904 and practice in Lachine. He was elected to the Legislative Assembly of Quebec for the electoral district of Jacques-Cartier in the 1916 election. A Quebec Liberal, he was re-elected in the 1919 election and was defeated in the 1923 election. From 1923 to 1925, he was mayor of Lachine.
