= John Abbott College =

Public college in Sainte-Anne-de-Bellevue, Quebec

Coordinates: 45°24′20.68″N 73°56′30.56″W

- Collège John Abbott (French)
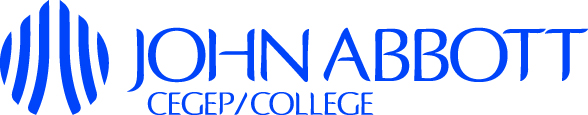
- Motto: Lakeside view, global vision.
- Type: Public
- Established: 1971
- Affiliations: McGill University, CICan, CCAA, QSSF, CBIE
- Director General: Teresa Berghello
- Administrative staff: 700+
- Students: 7000
- Undergraduates: pre-university, career, and continuing education students
- Location: Sainte-Anne-de-Bellevue, Québec, Canada
- Campus: Suburban (1,600 acres or 650 hectares)
- Language: English
- Newspaper: Bandersnatch
- Sports teams: Islanders
- Colours: Gold and Blue
- Nicknames: JAC, Abbott
- Mascot: Islander
- Website: johnabbott.qc.ca

John Abbott College (French: Collège John Abbott) is an English-language public college located in Sainte-Anne-de-Bellevue, Quebec, Canada, near the western tip of the Island of Montreal. John Abbott College is one of eight English public colleges in Quebec. The college primarily serves the Greater Montreal Region. The CEGEP shares grounds with McGill University's Macdonald Campus.

== History ==
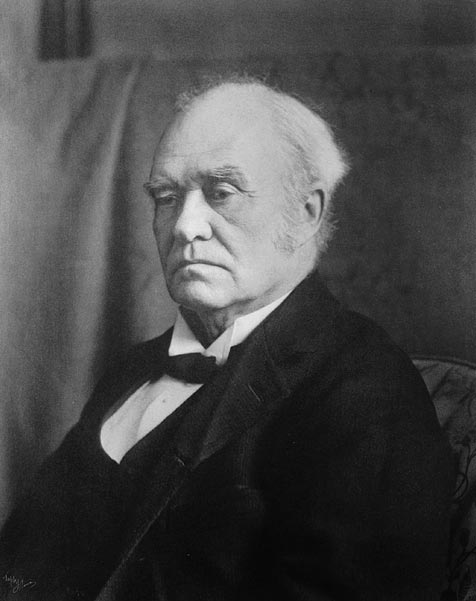
Sir John Abbott

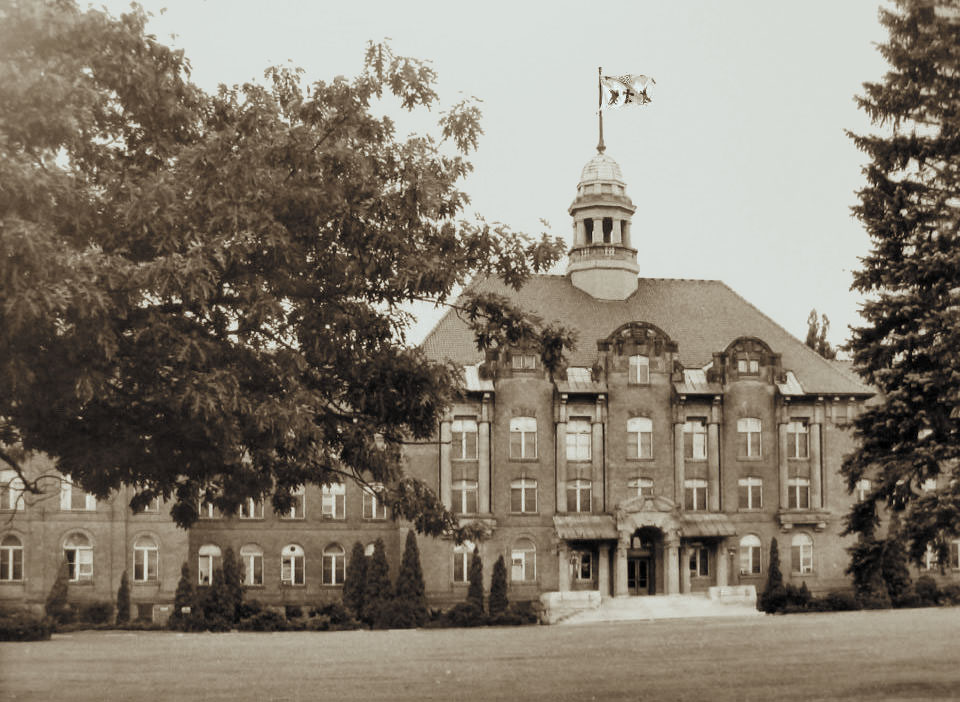
Macdonald College's Main Building in the 1940s

The college was accredited in 1970 and opened the next year. It is housed in early 20th-century buildings on a 1,600 acres (650 ha) campus shared with McGill University's Macdonald College. The college is named after John Abbott, prime minister, and former mayor of Montreal who owned a country estate in nearby Senneville. He is most remembered for his role in the Pacific Scandal, the political corruption case which brought down the government of Sir John A. Macdonald in 1873.

The college originally planned to build a new campus in Pointe-Claire next to Fairview Shopping Centre. It "temporarily" moved into buildings on the Macdonald College campus that had been vacated the previous year by McGill's Faculty of Education when it moved to its downtown campus. Additional temporary facilities were rented on Hymus Boulevard in Kirkland, known as the Kirkland Campus. A shuttle bus connected the two campuses. In 1973, the college decided to consolidate the college in Sainte-Anne-de-Bellevue by constructing a new building (subsequently named the Casgrain Centre) and renovating the existing buildings. The Kirkland Campus closed in December 1979, and the construction and renovations in Sainte-Anne were completed in 1981. It remained the last college in Quebec to be renting its campus until 2002, when it bought its buildings from the University. McGill University still owns and operates the majority of the land on campus.

== Campus ==
The college is situated on the shores of Lake Saint-Louis in Sainte-Anne-de-Bellevue. There are a total of ten buildings on campus, all of which are connected to each other in some fashion (with the exception of Brittain Hall).

=== Brittain Hall ===
Brittain Hall houses the Continuing Education centre of the college and honours the memory of Dr. W. H. Brittain, former Vice Principal of Macdonald College. It was a men's residence until 1981. Most of the building remains closed due to severe damage caused by a fire in 1981.

=== Casgrain Centre ===
The Casgrain Centre houses the sports complex, as well as the theatre and art studios of the college, and is named in honour of Thérèse Casgrain, a Canadian senator who was an advocate for the women's suffrage movement. The Casgrain building also houses a café, a large student lounge, and the student Agora, an indoor multi-use area for hosting trade fairs, musical performances, movie screenings, exhibitions, and other student-related events and activities.

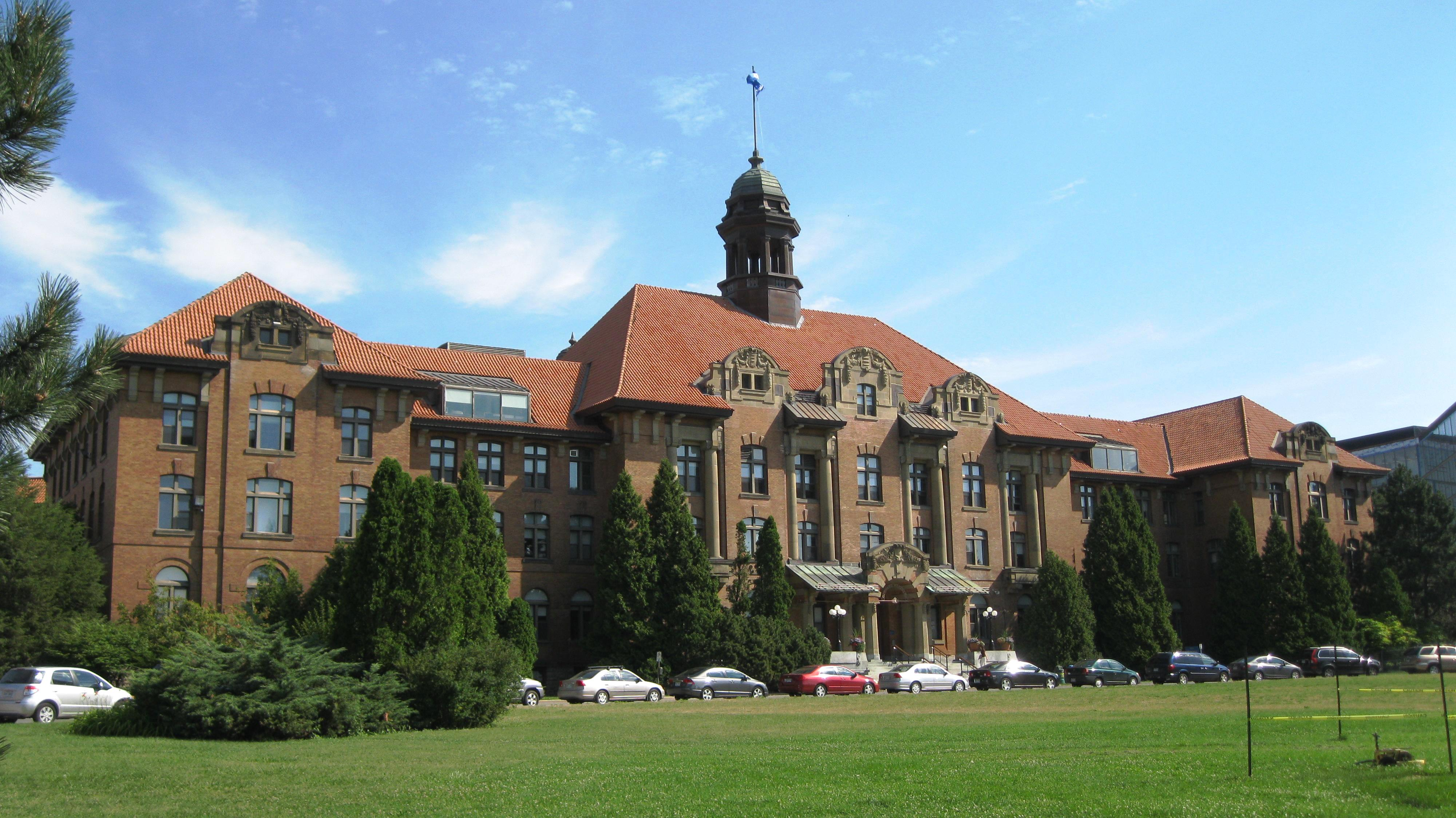
The Herzberg building.

=== Herzberg building ===
The Herzberg building is the central building on campus, housing classrooms and labs for a variety of subjects. The building is also home to essential student services, such as the college library, the Oval coffeehouse, offices for various clubs, the Print Services office, as well as offices for both the director general and the academic dean. Herzberg also houses the Agora, a large open space used for presentations, career fairs and some ceremonies. Other student services located in the Herzberg building include the Indigenous Student Resource Centre, Academic Advising, Counselling Services, the Student Employment Centre, Financial Assistance office, Health and Wellness Centre, the Learning Centre, Legal Advisory Services, Registrar's office, the Access Centre, Student Activities and the University and Career Information Centre. The building is named in honour of Gerhard Herzberg, a pioneering German Canadian physicist and physical chemist who won the Nobel Prize for Chemistry in 1971.

=== Hochelaga building ===
The Hochelaga building houses classrooms for a variety of courses, including history, economics, political science, humanities, philosophy, religion, psychology and sociology, as well as program-specific courses for business administration, commerce, correctional intervention, information and library technologies, and police technology programs. The building was named after a lost Iroquoian village visited by Jaques Cartier in 1534, which carried the same name, in honour of Canada's Indigenous people.

=== Penfield building ===
The Penfield building houses classrooms for English, creative arts, French, foreign language and geography courses. It also houses a number of professional programs, including the computer science, engineering technologies, Paramedic Program and publication design and hypermedia technology. The building houses an auditorium, as well as the offices of the Student Union (SUJAC) and the John Abbott College Faculty Association (JACFA). The Pedagogical Computer Centre (PCC) is located on the third floor of the building, home to labs with the necessary materials to conduct courses requiring student computer use. The building is named after Dr. Wilder Graves Penfield, a famous American-born Canadian neurosurgeon.

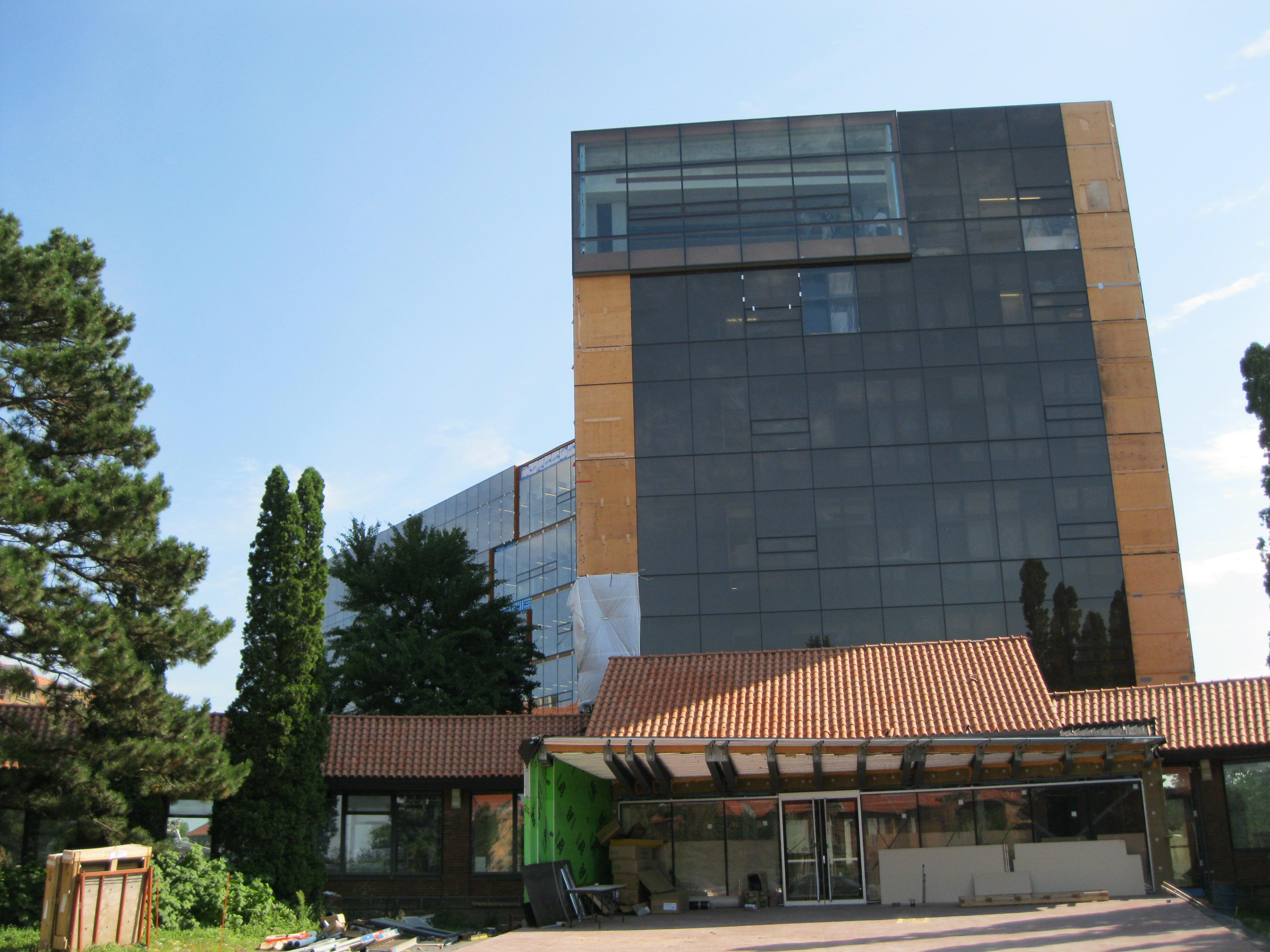
Edward building under construction, summer 2012

=== Anne-Marie Edward Science building ===
Opened in 2012, the Anne-Marie Edward Science Building is the location of the Science and Health Technologies departments. It is located between Herzberg and Stewart buildings. The AME building is distinctly modern when compared to the rest of the campus. By comparison, Herzberg has a total of 5 floors, including the basement, while AME has a total of 6 floors. The building contains 33 laboratories and 11 classrooms, along with over 50 staff offices. The building is solely reserved for the school's biology, biopharmaceutical, chemistry, nursing, physics, and paramedic departments. The building's name commemorates Polytechnique victim and John Abbott College alumna Anne-Marie Edward.

=== Stewart Hall ===
Stewart Hall is home to a small number of classrooms, the college bookstore, the college cafeteria, as well as administrative offices and the college boardroom. The building honours the memory of Mr. and Mrs. Walter Stewart, benefactors to Macdonald College.

=== Other buildings ===
==== Stewart East ====
Connected to the eastern side of the Stewart Apartments, Stewart East is home to classrooms for the dental hygiene program and the college's own dental clinic.

==== Jones Building ====
The Jones building was once accessible via the Hochelaga building. However, changes have resulted in the building only being accessible from outdoors. The second floor contains offices used by the football program.

== Programs ==
Pre-university programs usually consist of four semesters (2 years), while career programs usually consist of six (3 years).

Pre-university programs offered
- Arts and Sciences
- Arts, Literature and Communication
- Fine Arts
- Liberal Arts
- Science and Social Science (Double DEC)
- Sciences
  - Pure and Applied Science
  - Health Science
  - Pathways to Science
- Social Science
  - General Social Science
  - Mathematics
  - Commerce
  - Psychology
  - Justice and Society
  - Global Citizenship
- Honours Social Science
  - Honours Social Science with Mathematics
  - Honours Commerce
  - Honours Psychology
  - Honours Justice and Society
  - Honours Global Citizenship

Career programs offered
- Biopharmaceutical Production Technology
- Business Administration
- Computer Science
- Dental Hygiene
- Engineering
  - Photonics
  - Energy Management
  - Industrial Process
- Information and Library Technologies
- Graphic & Web Design
- Nursing
- Police Technology
- Paramedic Program
- Professional Theatre (Acting)
- Professional Theatre (Design)
- Youth and Adult Correctional Intervention

== Students ==
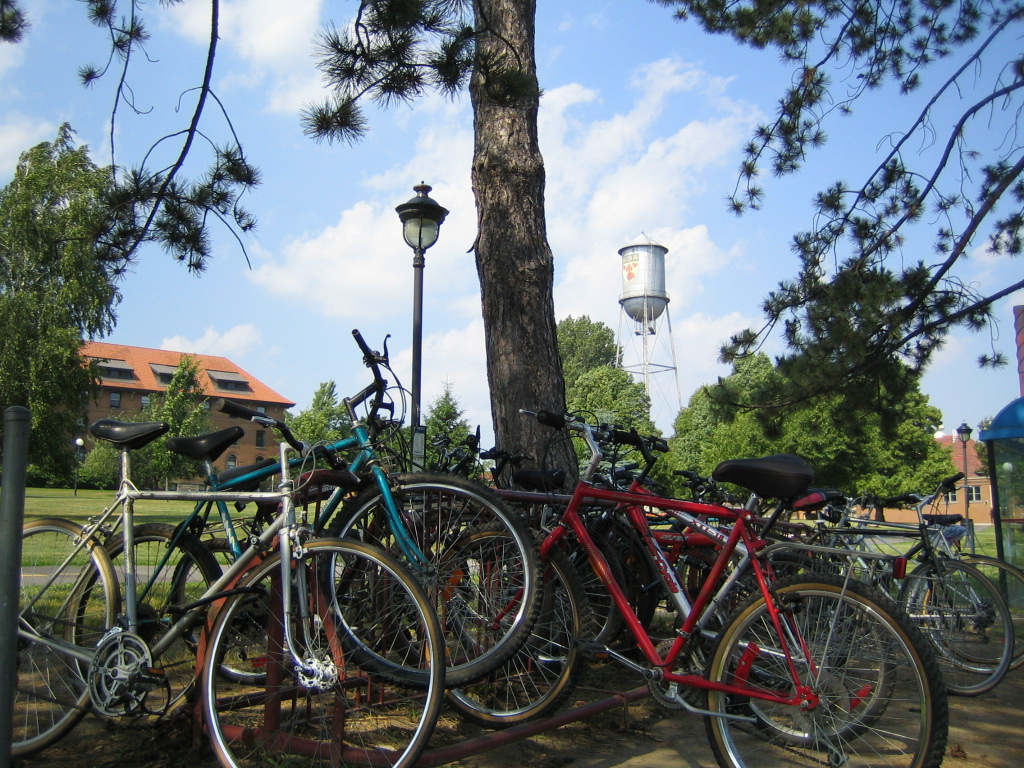
Bike rack, summer 2007

=== Composition ===
Over 6000 students are enrolled in the Day Division and about 2100 are in the Continuing Education Division. The college primarily serves the western end of the Montreal metropolitan area, although it also has students from other parts of Quebec, the rest of Canada and approximately one hundred international students.

=== Stewart Apartments ===
The Stewart Apartments are co-educational residences for full-time students attending John Abbott College. They are the only student residences in the Montreal area that are directly operated by a public English-language college.

=== Student Union ===
The Student Union of John Abbott College (SUJAC) promotes and defends students' rights and interests. SUJAC is the official liaison between the students and the college, representing students on committees, organizing student events, and overseeing the allocation of certain student fees for the various clubs that operate throughout the college. SUJAC works on behalf of students and informs them on relevant issues and college matters. The president of SUJAC for the 2026-2027 Academic Year is Makayla Wight. The VP Internal of SUJAC this year is Matthieu Poskin. The VP External is Jolene Xu. The VP Finance is Avery Zylberstein. The VP Academic is Marilou Brisson. The VP communications for this year is Sofia Jaramillo.

=== Student life ===
The college community offers a variety of extracurricular activities and clubs. The college operates its own radio station, CSKY radio, giving students the opportunity to explore the world of broadcasting. The student newspaper Bandersnatch has been published biweekly since the college's establishment in 1971. John Abbott College Model United Nations Club (JACMUN) hosts an annual Model United Nations conference in the spring, which has been personally recognized by Prime Minister Justin Trudeau as a salient effort to promote political awareness and participation amongst youth.

== Athletics ==
The Casgrain Sport Centre is the home to the John Abbott College Islanders and Lady Islanders who compete in basketball, volleyball, lacrosse, baseball, soccer, rugby, swimming, football, tennis, cross country running and hockey.

The baseball team The Islanders finished second in the 2006 Canadian Intercollegiate Baseball Association's Northern Conference. The men's soccer team John Abbott College Islanders won the semi-finals of the 2000 provincial championship in overtime. The football team won the 2019 Bol D'Or, a thrilling win played during a snow storm. This was the program's first championship since winning the 2002 Bol D'Or. The football program has made 3 straight Bol D'Or appearances and has made it to at least the semi-finals since 2013.

== Media events ==
- John Abbott College students and twins Catherine and Isabelle Bourassa appeared in Playboy's March 1999 college edition.
- In the 8th season of The Amazing Race, teams had to travel to the McGill portion of the campus to engage in curling at Glenfinnan Rink.
- The movie Satan's School for Girls (2000) was shot at the college.
- A five-minute scene was filmed on campus for the feature film Bon Cop, Bad Cop (2006) near the Stewart Hall entrance and inside the lobby of the Herzberg building.
- Most of the interior and exterior shots of the high school in the movie The Secret (2007), starring David Duchovny, were filmed on campus.
- The Spike series "Blue Mountain State" was filmed on campus.
- "Punisher: War Zone" filmed some pyrotechnic stunts in the Britain Hall building.
- Big Wolf on Campus used outside shots of the school.
- The movie Race(2016) used outside and inside shots of the school.
- Pet Sematary used outside shots of the school.

== Notable alumni ==
- Anjali Nayar, filmmaker and journalist
- Chris Milo, Canadian football player
- Donovan King, actor
- Elliott Price, radio personality and sports broadcaster
- Geof Isherwood, comic book illustrator
- Glen Murray, Mayor of Winnipeg
- Geoffrey Kelley, politician
- Greg Kelley (politician)
- Jade Hassouné, Actor
- Annie Ittoshat, Anglican bishop
- L. P. Ladouceur, NFL football player, Dallas Cowboys
- Mark Kelley, CBC reporter
- Michael Soles, CFL fullback
- René Bazinet, actor
- Rene Paredes, CFL kicker, Calgary Stampeders
- Ruth Taylor, poet
- Sam Roberts, musician
- Serban Ghenea, multi-Grammy Award winning mixing engineer
- Steve Anthony, television personality, voice-over artist
- Frances Donald, economist

== Notable staff ==
- David Solway
- Edeet Ravel
- George Springate
- Trevor W. Payne
- Kevin Tierney
- Neil Cameron

== See also ==
- Higher education in Quebec
- List of universities in Quebec
- Canadian Interuniversity Sport
- Canadian government scientific research organizations
- Canadian university scientific research organizations

Other English-language public colleges:

- Champlain
- Dawson College
- Heritage College
- Marianopolis College
- Vanier College
