= Ruth Taylor (poet) =

Canadian poet, editor and college teacher (1961 – 2006)

Ruth Taylor (10 January 1961 – 18 February 2006) was a Canadian poet, editor and college teacher. Born in Lachine, Quebec, and raised in Pincourt, Quebec, she attended John Abbott College, McGill University, and Concordia University.

Taylor was the author of three collections of poetry: The Drawing Board (1988); Dragon Papers (1994), a finalist for the A. M. Klein Prize for Poetry; and Comet Wine (2007), published posthumously.

Taylor taught English literature at John Abbott College from 1986 to 2006.

She died in February 2006 of alcohol poisoning, shortly after completing Comet Wine. Her marriage to Nicolas Keyserlingk ended in divorce; they were parents to one son.

== Selected works ==
- The Drawing Board — 1988
- The Dragon Papers — 1994
- Muse On!: The Muses Company Anthology 1980-1995 — 1995 (editor)
- Comet Wine — 2007
