= Noël Saint-Germain =

Canadian politician

MNA for Jacques-Cartier
- In office 1966–1981
- Preceded by: Marie-Claire Kirkland
- Succeeded by: Joan Dougherty

Personal details
- Born: December 24, 1922 Lachine, Quebec, Canada
- Died: July 27, 1998 (aged 75) Lachine, Quebec, Canada
- Party: Liberal

Noël Saint-Germain (December 24, 1922 – July 27, 1998) was a Canadian politician in the province of Quebec, who represented Jacques-Cartier in the National Assembly of Quebec from 1966 to 1981.

Born in Lachine, Quebec, Saint-Germain studied optometry at the Université de Montréal. He was an alderman in Lachine, Quebec from 1965 to 1966. He was elected in the 1966 Quebec general election for the Quebec Liberal Party, and was re-elected in 1970, 1973, and 1976. He did not run for re-election in 1981.
