= Urfa (disambiguation) =

Urfa, officially Şanlıurfa, is a city in Turkey.

Urfa may also refer to:

- Urfa Province or Şanlıurfa Province, a province in southeastern Turkey
- Urfa Province or Aleppo vilayet, an administrative division of the Ottoman Empire
- Battle of Urfa (spring 1920), between the French occupying army and the Turkish National Forces
- Urfa biber, a dried Turkish chili pepper
- Urfa Man (circa 9000 BC), an anthropomorphological statue found near Urfa, Turkey

== See also ==
- Urfé (disambiguation)
