= Alexander von Humboldt German International School Montreal =

- French: École internationale allemande Alexander von Humboldt; German: Deutsche Internationale Schule Alexander von Humboldt Montreal

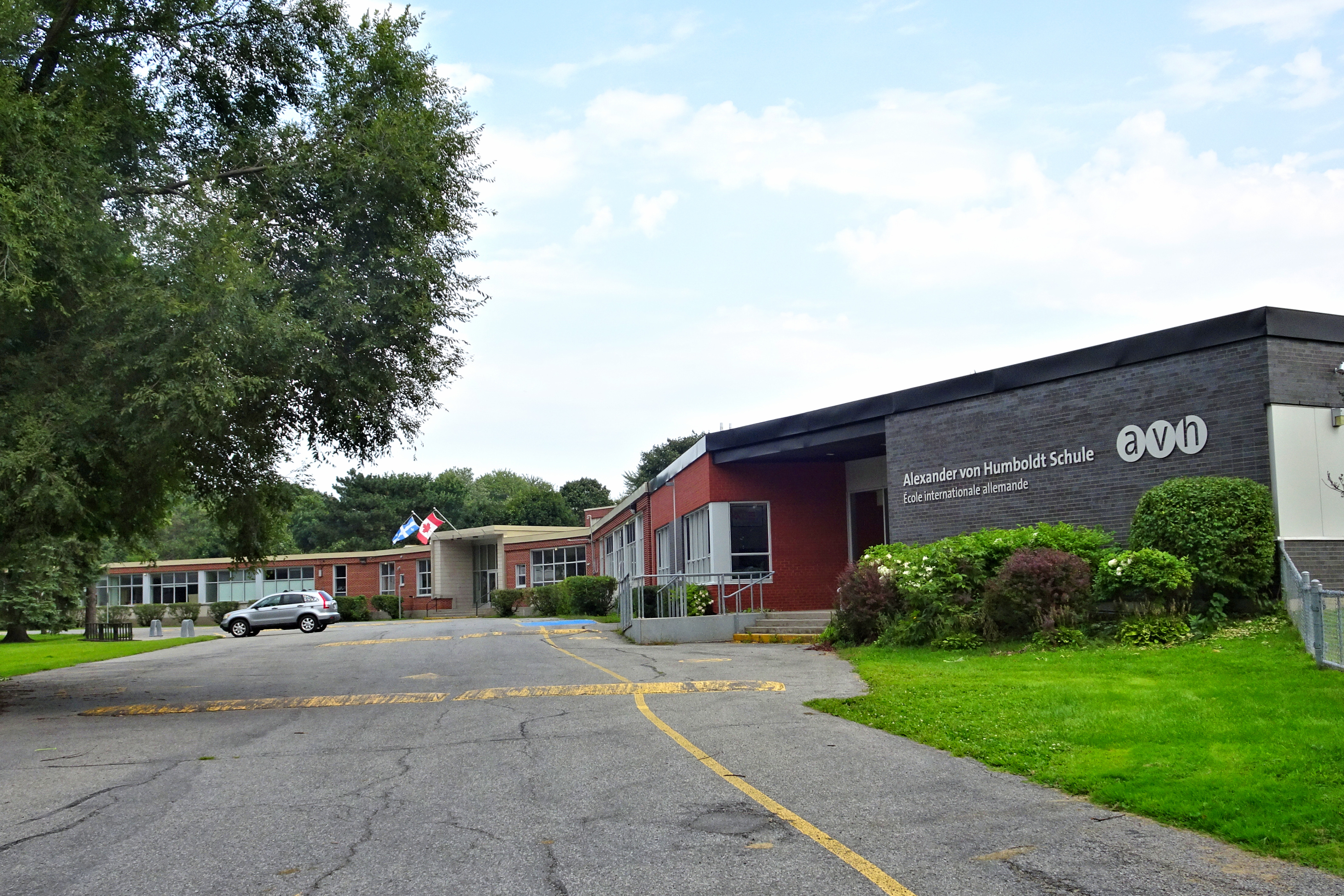

Location
- 216, rue Victoria; Baie-D'Urfé, Quebec, H9X 2H9; Canada; 45°25′00″N 73°54′30″W

Information
- Type: International school
- Established: 1980
- Principal: Delia Simons
- Staff: 30 teachers
- Grades: Pre-Kindergarten to Grade 12
- Enrollment: 300 students
- Language: German, English, and French
- Named for: Alexander von Humboldt
- Website: avh.montreal.qc.ca

The Alexander von Humboldt German International School Montreal (AvH; French: École internationale allemande Alexander von Humboldt, German: Deutsche Internationale Schule Alexander von Humboldt Montreal) is an international private co-educational multilingual (German, English and French) school located in Baie-D'Urfé, Quebec, a West Island suburb of Montreal. It was founded in 1980 to educate the German community of Montreal.

Its campus was formerly Oakridge Elementary School.

== History ==
Founded in 1980, the AvH school opens its doors in Notre-Dame-de-Grâce district in Montreal to further moved in 1984 in a new building located in Baie-D’Urfé. Originally, it started with 22 students and now the school hosts more than 300 students. The school was founded to offer a German education to immigrants from Germany to Quebec. Today, the school serves a much greater community (e.g. Germans, Canadians, Americans, Italians, etc.).

The school is funded through school fees, donations, and support from the Federal Government of the Federal Republic of Germany.

== Student body ==
As of 2016, there were 300 students, of which 66% came from non-German-speaking households. The remainder came from German-speaking households.

In 1996 the student body numbered 210.

== Operations ==
The school cooperates with the Goethe Institute in order to promote German culture in the Montreal area.

== Curriculum ==
Even though the school is not funded by the government of Quebec, it follows the standards of the Quebec Ministry of Education. Therefore, the students receive the provincial diploma upon graduation from high school.

Students may not choose to graduate at Grade 11 with the Diplôme des études secondaires and go on to CEGEP; but stay until Grade 12 and get the German International Abitur (DIA) and then immediately attend a university or college. Students may also earn the Deutsches Sprachdiplom, a certificate in German proficiency at grade 12.

The school has courses taught in German, French, and English. In PreKindergarten and Kindergarten courses are mostly in German while French and English courses are introduced in the first grade. The only classes taught in French and/or English are the non-German language classes.

The German government funds operations at the school, including eight teaching positions, while the government of Quebec does not fund this school.

== Academic performance ==
In 1995 all of the students taking the Quebec provincial examinations passed even though the curriculum was not aligned with Quebec standards. Karen Seidman of the Montreal Gazette wrote that the school "so overwhelmingly aced [the tests] that it now has virtually no place to go but down."

== Diplomas offered ==
Year	Diploma	Description
Grade 10	Sekundarstufe-I-Prüfung	German High School Diploma I (allows students to continue in the Sekundarstufe-II education level)
Grade 11	Diplôme des études secondaires (DÉS)	Quebec High School Leaving Diploma (allows students to pursue studies in Quebec's CÉGEP system)
Grade 12	Deutsches Sprachdiplom	German Language Diploma granting access to German-language university programs
Grade 12	Deutsche Internationale Abiturprüfung (DIAP) (Sekundarstufe-II)	German High School-Diploma II (allows students to study in any programme at any University in the world)

== Academic administration ==
- Principal: Delia Simons
- Vice-Principal: Tobias Grygier
- Principal Elementary School: Rainer Urschel
- Preschool Coordinator: Christiane El Aboudy-Kalz

== See also ==
- Canadians of German ethnicity
