= Joan Dougherty =

Canadian politician (1927–2020)

MNA for Jacques-Cartier
- In office 1981–1989
- Preceded by: Noël Saint-Germain
- Succeeded by: Neil Cameron

Personal details
- Born: March 2, 1927 Montreal, Quebec, Canada
- Died: December 18, 2020 (aged 93) Westmount, Quebec, Canada
- Party: Liberal
- Profession: social worker

Joan Dougherty (2 March 1927 – 18 December 2020) was a Canadian politician in the province of Quebec.

== Biography ==
Born in Montreal, Quebec, to Edward Mason, a physician, and Loretta O'Reilly, Dougherty studied at The Study, a private girls' school, and received a Bachelor of Science degree in 1947 and a Masters in histology in 1950 from McGill University. She did post-graduate studies at the Massachusetts Institute of Technology in biophysics.

Dougherty represented Jacques-Cartier in the National Assembly of Quebec from 1981 to 1989.

She died from COVID-19 during the COVID-19 pandemic in Quebec.
