= Neil Cameron (Quebec politician) =

Canadian politician (1938–2019)

MNA for Jacques-Cartier
- In office 1989–1994
- Preceded by: Joan Dougherty
- Succeeded by: Geoffrey Kelley

Personal details
- Born: Neil Murdo Cameron; November 19, 1938 Weyburn, Saskatchewan, Canada
- Died: December 19, 2019 (aged 81)
- Party: Equality Party
- Education: Queen's University
- Profession: CEGEP history teacher

Neil Murdo Cameron (November 19, 1938 – December 19, 2019) was a Canadian politician in the province of Quebec.

== Background ==
Cameron was born in Weyburn, Saskatchewan. His father, Doctor Henry George Cameron, died when he was three, and he was raised by his mother, Enid Constance, a medical secretary, in Calgary, Alberta. He graduated from Crescent Heights High School in Calgary in 1956, with an Alberta Hotelmen's Scholarship to the University of Alberta, also winning a Robinson Memorial Scholarship in Creative Writing to attend the Banff School of Fine Arts Summer School. He switched from the University of Alberta after two years to Queen's University in Kingston, completing his degree, in mathematics with a minor in French Literature, in 1964.

He returned to university full-time in 1966–67, taking a qualifying year at Sir George Williams University in history and making the Dean's Honour List. He was admitted to graduate studies in history at McGill, taking his M.A. in history in 1969, and winning a McConnell Fellowship to continue Ph.D. studies in history. He carried out three years of Ph.D. research, including two years in England, a study of the British scientific elite in the first half of the 20th century, but never submitted his thesis, although publishing articles based on the research.

In 1973 he took a permanent position as a history teacher at John Abbott College in Sainte-Anne-de-Bellevue, which continued for over thirty years, also serving at as vice-president of the faculty association, member of the academic council, and executive member of the board of governors. He also taught university courses, part-time, in European history for Concordia University, in the history of science at Concordia Liberal Arts College and for McGill History Department.

From 1980, he began doing consulting work for Brendan Wood International, a financial research firm. In 1982 he became a freelance op-ed columnist and book reviewer, first for Montreal community newspapers, then for the Montreal Daily News, the Ottawa Citizen and the Montreal Gazette. He also published a number of articles in the U. S. as well as Canada, and scholarly studies in three historical essay collections, Rutherford and Physics at the Turn of the Century (1979), Otto Hahn and the Birth of Nuclear Physics (1980) and Leadership and Responsibility (2005).

Cameron was married from 1970 to 1989 to Ruth Woodward. He has a stepson and stepdaughter. He died on December 19, 2019.

== Provincial politics ==
In the 1989 provincial election, he ran as an Equality Party candidate in the Montreal riding of Jacques-Cartier and defeated Quebec Liberal Party incumbent Joan Dougherty. In the legislature, he served on the Education Committee, the Committee on the Future of Hydro-Electric Power, as an alternate voting member of the Belanger-Campeau Commission, and as a voting member of the Expert Committee on the Political Implications of Sovereignty. He prepared a minority report on the latter, Imagining Sovereignty/Souverainté d'Esprit, which was circulated to the major Canadian universities.

In 1993, he introduced Bill 199, a private member's bill which would have made English and French fully co-official languages in the province.

He continued to teach one course per year at John Abbott College throughout his term as an MNA.

Cameron was defeated by Liberal candidate Geoffrey Kelley in the 1994 provincial election.
