= Frances Donald =

Canadian economist

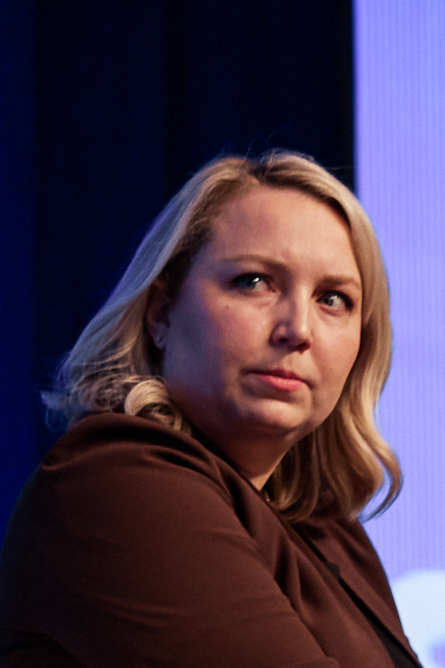
- Frances Donald at the Canada Summit, 2023
- Born: Montreal, Quebec, Canada
- Education: John Abbott College; Queen's University (BA), New York University (MA)
- Occupation: Economist
- Years active: 2008–present
- Employer: Royal Bank of Canada
- Known for: Macroeconomic strategy, financial market insights
- Title: Chief Economist
- Awards: Canada's Most Powerful Women Top 100 (2019)

Frances Donald is a Canadian-born economist and the Chief Economist of the Royal Bank of Canada.

== Early life and education ==
Donald was born in Montreal and attended school at the CEGEP John Abbott College. She obtained her Bachelor of Economics from Queen's University in 2008. Donald worked as a research analyst for the Bank of Canada before attending New York University where she earned her master's degree in economics in 2010.

Donald worked as a financial economist for Scotiabank in Toronto, and before that as a global macro analyst for Pavilion Global Markets in Montreal. Her early experience included various positions at Deloitte and Roubini Global Economics.

== Chief Economist ==
In 2024, Donald joined the Royal Bank of Canada as Chief Economist after previously serving as Chief Economist at Manulife since 2019. She joined Manulife in 2016 as a senior economist before becoming Head of Macro-Economic Strategy in 2018. In 2019, at age 33 she became the youngest Chief Economist in Canada and one of only two women to hold the title in Canada.
