= Geoffrey Kelley =

Canadian politician

Member of the National Assembly of Quebec for Jacques-Cartier
- In office September 12, 1994 – October 1, 2018
- Preceded by: Neil Cameron
- Succeeded by: Greg Kelley

Personal details
- Born: February 17, 1955 (age 71) Montreal, Quebec, Canada
- Party: Quebec Liberal Party
- Spouse: Judy Harper
- Children: 5, including Greg
- Profession: Politician, Teacher

Geoffrey Kelley (born February 17, 1955) is a Canadian politician, coach and teacher. He was a member of National Assembly of Quebec for the riding of Jacques-Cartier in Montreal's West Island region from 1994 to 2018, representing the Quebec Liberal Party.

Born in Montreal, Quebec, Kelley went to the Université de Montréal to study French courses and then obtained a diploma at John Abbott College. He would later obtain a bachelor's degree in history and a master's degree in modern history of Canada at McGill University. He was then a teacher at Commission scolaire du Lakeshore and a lecturer at various institutions including John Abbott College, Collège Marie-Victorin and McGill University. He was also the political aide for several cabinet ministers including the Minister of Education (1990), the Minister of Municipal Affairs and Public Security (1990–1994) and was a chief of staff of the Deputy Premier and the President of the Treasury Board (1994).

Kelley jumped into politics when he was elected in 1994 in Jacques-Cartier and re-elected in 1998. He served as the Liberal critic in family policy and native affairs. After being re-elected in 2003, he was a backbencher until he was named Minister for Native Affairs in 2005. Despite being re-elected to a fourth term in the 2007 elections, he was not re-appointed to Jean Charest's cabinet. He became chair of the Social Affairs Commission. In 2011 he was re-appointed as Minister for Native Affairs.

He announced his retirement in 2018, and was succeeded by his son Greg Kelley in the 2018 election.

Political offices
Preceded by Benoit Pelletier	Delegate Minister for Indian Affairs; 2005–2007	Succeeded by Benoit Pelletier
