= Jacques-Cartier =

Provincial electoral district in Quebec, Canada

Coordinates: 45.425°N 73.882°W

Quebec electoral district
- Location in Montreal

Provincial electoral district
- Legislature: National Assembly of Quebec
MNA
Greg Kelley
Liberal
- District created: 1867
- First contested: 1867
- Last contested: 2026

Demographics
- Population (2006): 59,416
- Electors (2014): 43,861
- Area (km²): 96.7
- Pop. density (per km²): 614.4
- Census division: Montreal
- Census subdivision(s): Baie-D'Urfé, Beaconsfield, Pointe-Claire, Sainte-Anne-de-Bellevue, Senneville

Jacques-Cartier (French pronunciation: [ʒak kaʁtje]) is a provincial electoral district in the West Island of Montreal, Canada, that elects members to the National Assembly of Quebec. It is one of the few provincial electoral districts in Quebec with an Anglophone majority. It notably includes the city of Pointe-Claire.

Named after Jacques Cartier, the district existed in the Legislative Assembly of the Province of Canada, and its present incarnation dates from the 1867 election.

In 2011, district boundaries were redrawn, and part of Kirkland was transferred to Nelligan, in exchange for Senneville.

== Members of the Legislative Assembly / National Assembly ==
Legislature	Years	Member	Party
1st	1867–1871	Narcisse Lecavalier	Conservative
2nd	1871–1875	Narcisse Lecavalier	Conservative
3rd	1875–1878	Narcisse Lecavalier	Conservative
4th	1878–1881	Narcisse Lecavalier	Conservative
5th	1881–1882	Narcisse Lecavalier	Conservative
5th	1882–1883	Joseph-Alfred Mousseau	Conservative
5th	1883–1884	Joseph-Alfred Mousseau	Conservative
5th	1884–1886	Arthur Boyer	Liberal
6th	1886–1890	Arthur Boyer	Liberal
7th	1890–1892	Arthur Boyer	Liberal
8th	1892–1897	Joseph-Adélard Descarries	Conservative
9th	1897–1900	Joseph-Adolphe Chauret	Liberal
10th	1900–1904	Joseph-Adolphe Chauret	Liberal
11th	1904–1908	Joseph-Adolphe Chauret	Liberal
12th	1908–1912	Philémon Cousineau	Conservative
13th	1912–1916	Philémon Cousineau	Conservative
14th	1916–1919	Joseph-Séraphin-Aimé Ashby	Liberal
15th	1919–1923	Joseph-Séraphin-Aimé Ashby	Liberal
16th	1923–1925	Ésioff-Léon Patenaude	Conservative
16th	1925–1927	Victor Marchand	Liberal
17th	1927–1931	Victor Marchand	Liberal
18th	1931–1932	Victor Marchand	Liberal
18th	1933–1935	Joseph-Théodule Rhéaume	Liberal
19th	1935–1936	Frederick Arthur Monk	Action libérale nationale
20th	1936–1939	Anatole Carignan	Union Nationale
21st	1939–1944	Charles-Aimé Kirkland	Liberal
22nd	1944–1948	Charles-Aimé Kirkland	Liberal
23rd	1948–1952	Charles-Aimé Kirkland	Liberal
24th	1952–1956	Charles-Aimé Kirkland	Liberal
25th	1956–1960	Charles-Aimé Kirkland	Liberal
26th	1960–1961	Charles-Aimé Kirkland	Liberal
26th	1961–1962	Marie-Claire Kirkland	Liberal
27th	1962–1966	Marie-Claire Kirkland	Liberal
28th	1966–1970	Noël Saint-Germain	Liberal
29th	1970–1973	Noël Saint-Germain	Liberal
30th	1973–1976	Noël Saint-Germain	Liberal
31st	1976–1981	Noël Saint-Germain	Liberal
32nd	1981–1985	Joan Dougherty	Liberal
33rd	1985–1989	Joan Dougherty	Liberal
34th	1989–1994	Neil Cameron	Equality
35th	1994–1998	Geoffrey Kelley	Liberal
36th	1998–2003	Geoffrey Kelley	Liberal
37th	2003–2007	Geoffrey Kelley	Liberal
38th	2007–2008	Geoffrey Kelley	Liberal
39th	2008–2012	Geoffrey Kelley	Liberal
40th	2012–2014	Geoffrey Kelley	Liberal
41st	2014–2018	Geoffrey Kelley	Liberal
42nd	2018–2022	Greg Kelley	Liberal
43rd	2022–2026	Greg Kelley	Liberal
44th	2026–Present	Greg Kelley	Liberal

== Electoral results ==
2026 Quebec general election
The 2026 general election will be held on October 5.
Party	Candidate	Votes	%	±%
Liberal	Gregory Kelley	22,456	73.21	
Conservative	Pina Di Dio	3,309	10.79	
Québec solidaire	Gabriel Laurence-Brook	1,696	5.53	
Parti Québécois	Céline Dauphinais	1,329	4.33	
Coalition Avenir Québec	Santiago Proteau Sanchez	881	2.87	
Green	Bianca Jitaru	566	1.85	
Canadian	Yesica Ochoa	438	1.43	
Total valid votes				
Total rejected ballots				
Turnout			63.60	
Electors on the lists				

2022 Quebec general election
Party	Candidate	Votes	%	±%
Liberal	Greg Kelley	18,158	62.57	-9.24
Conservative	Louis-Charles Fortier	3,260	11.23	+8.64
Coalition Avenir Québec	Rébecca Guénard-Chouinard	2,735	9.42	+0.10
Canadian	Arthur Fischer	1,462	5.04	–
Québec solidaire	Marie-Ève Mathieu	1,456	5.02	+0.63
Green	Virginie Beaudet	1,074	3.70	-3.03
Parti Québécois	Chantal Beauregard	877	3.02	+0.25
Total valid votes		29,022	99.35	–
Total rejected ballots		190	0.65	–
Turnout		29,212	63.17	-1.94
Electors on the lists		46,245	–	–

2018 Quebec general election
Party	Candidate	Votes	%	±%
Liberal	Gregory Kelley	21,133	71.81	-13.61
Coalition Avenir Québec	Karen Hilchey	2,744	9.32	+3.42
Green	Catherine Polson	1,981	6.73	+4.08
Québec solidaire	Nicolas Chatel-Launay	1,291	4.39	+2.02
Parti Québécois	Martine Bourgeois	815	2.77	-0.22
Conservative	Louis-Charles Fortier	762	2.59	+1.95
New Democratic	France Séguin	555	1.89	
Independent	Teodor Daiev	78	0.27	
Citoyens au pouvoir	Cynthia Bouchard	72	0.24	
Total valid votes		29,431	99.37	
Total rejected ballots		186	0.63	
Turnout		29,617	65.11	
Eligible voters		45,490		
Liberal hold		Swing		-8.52
Source(s) "Rapport des résultats officiels du scrutin". Élections Québec.

2014 Quebec general election
Party	Candidate	Votes	%	±%
Liberal	Geoffrey Kelley	30,823	85.42	+12.31
Coalition Avenir Québec	Denis Deguire	2,128	5.90	-9.02
Parti Québécois	Laurence Desroches	1,079	2.99	-0.68
Green	James Maynard	966	2.68	-1.86
Québec solidaire	Jean-François Belley	855	2.37	-0.19
Conservative	Louis-Charles Fortier	232	0.64	–
Total valid votes		36,083	99.63	–
Total rejected ballots		133	0.37	–
Turnout		36,216	81.18	+4.29
Electors on the lists		44,612	–	–

2012 Quebec general election
Party	Candidate	Votes	%	±%
Liberal	Geoffrey Kelley	24,525	73.11	-7.74
Coalition Avenir Québec	Paola L. Hawa	5,006	14.92	+11.09*
Green	Alex Tyrrell	1,522	4.54	-2.97
Parti Québécois	Olivier Gendreau	1,232	3.67	-2.35
Québec solidaire	François-Xavier Charlebois	859	2.56	+1.12
Independent	Francis Juneau	189	0.56	–
Option nationale	Raphaël Hébert	128	0.38	–
Quebec Citizens' Union	Ágnes Mina Barti	86	0.26	–
Total valid votes		33,547	99.47	–
Total rejected ballots		178	0.53	–
Turnout		33,725	76.89	+24.12
Electors on the lists		43,861	–	–

* Result compared to Action démocratique

2008 Quebec general election
Party	Candidate	Votes	%	±%
Liberal	Geoffrey Kelley	20,433	80.85	+10.61
Green	Ryan Young	1,897	7.51	-3.57
Parti Québécois	Olivier Gendreau	1,522	6.02	+1.80
Action démocratique	Marie-Hélène Trudel	969	3.83	-8.58
Québec solidaire	Marianne Breton-Fontaine	364	1.44	-0.09
Marxist–Leninist	Marsha Fine	87	0.34	–
Total valid votes		25,272	99.32	–
Total rejected ballots		174	0.68	–
Turnout		25,446	52.77	-14.58
Electors on the lists		48,221	–	–

2007 Quebec general election
Party	Candidate	Votes	%	±%
Liberal	Geoffrey Kelley	22,481	70.24	-16.55
Action démocratique	Walter Rulli	3,973	12.41	+8.79
Green	Ryan Young	3,545	11.08	+8.98
Parti Québécois	Sophia Caporicci	1,352	4.22	-1.25
Québec solidaire	Jill Hanley	491	1.53	–
Independent	Andy Srougi	166	0.52	–
Total valid votes		32,008	99.48	–
Total rejected ballots		166	0.52	–
Turnout		32,174	67.35	-2.89
Electors on the lists		47,774	–	–

2003 Quebec general election
Party	Candidate	Votes	%	±%
Liberal	Geoffrey Kelley	30,035	86.79	+3.12
Parti Québécois	Guy Amyot	1,894	5.47	-2.95
Action démocratique	Jeffrey Penney	1,253	3.62	+0.08
Green	Ryan Young	727	2.10	–
Equality	Keith Henderson	650	1.88	-1.94
No designation	Daniel Cormier-Roach	49	0.14	–

1998 Quebec general election
Party	Candidate	Votes	%	±%
Liberal	Geoffrey Kelley	32,924	83.67	+0.02
Parti Québécois	Guy Amyot	3,315	8.42	-0.35
Equality	William F. Shaw	1,502	3.82	-2.33
Action démocratique	Alexandre Barnes	1,392	3.54	–
Socialist Democracy	Eugène Busque	217	0.55	–

1995 Quebec referendum
Side	Votes	%
Non	40,689	91.02
Oui	4,016	8.98

1994 Quebec general election
Party	Candidate	Votes	%	±%
Liberal	Geoffrey Kelley	32,839	83.65	+42.13
Parti Québécois	Maurice Crépeau	3,441	8.77	-0.22
Equality	Neil Cameron	2,415	6.15	-37.75
Natural Law	Maurice Bergeron	206	0.52	–
CANADA!	Gilles Florent Pepin	186	0.47	–
Economic	Karl Berryman	94	0.24	–
Communist	Jacques Hardy	76	0.19	–

1992 Charlottetown Accord referendum
Side	Votes	%
Oui	33,272	83.47
Non	6,588	16.53

1989 Quebec general election
Party	Candidate	Votes	%	±%
Equality	Neil Cameron	14,821	43.90	–
Liberal	Joan Dougherty	14,019	41.52	-38.84
Parti Québécois	Claudette Montpetit	3,035	8.99	-3.74
Green	Amy E. Barratt	1,419	4.20	+3.17
New Democratic	Thomas Ezzy	228	0.68	-2.72
Independent	Neal Ford	192	0.57	–
Independent	Howard Galganov	50	0.15	–

(Reports on earlier elections in the district not available here at this time.)

== See also ==
- List of Quebec provincial electoral districts
- Canadian provincial electoral districts
