= Outcry (miniseries) =

2020 documentary miniseries

- Genre: True crime
- Written by: Pat Kondelis
- Directed by: Pat Kondelis
- Starring: Greg Kelley
- Country of origin: United States
- Original language: English
- No. of seasons: 1
- No. of episodes: 5

Production
- Producers: Lauren Barker; Stephen Espinoza; Stephen Germer; Lynsey Tamsen Jones; Pat Kondelis; Vinnie Malhotra; Michael Rockafellow; Jody Wingrove
- Cinematography: Ivy Chiu
- Editor: Sean McQueeney

Original release
- Network: Showtime
- Release: July 5 – August 2, 2020

Outcry is a 2020 documentary television miniseries written and directed by Pat Kondelis about the real-life story of high school football star Greg Kelley, who was arrested, jailed, and wrongfully convicted for sexual assault of a 4-year-old boy, and his highly vocal support system that pushed back in their quest for truth and justice. The Showtime mini-series premiered on July 5, 2020.

Into Greg Kelley's senior year in Leander, Texas, he was arrested, jailed, and convicted of sexual assault of a four-year-old boy who attended day care in the home where Kelley was living. A second boy recanted his outcry on the stand during the trial. Kelley was sentenced to 25 years in prison with no possibility for parole. In support of Kelley, a groundswell emerged of people who called into question the small-town police force, their investigation, the prosecution's tactics, and ultimately the validity of the conviction in one of the most controversial cases the county had ever seen. Kelley was completely exonerated in November 2019.

"This does not feel like freedom at all," said Kelley, before his exoneration. Complete exoneration by the Criminal Court of Appeals in Texas is very rare.

== Reception ==
Rotten Tomatoes favorably rates Outcry 89% from 9 critics and 93% from 15 users, while the Internet Movie Database rates it 8.4/10 from 690 users. Metacritic rates Outcry 78% from 5 critics.

The Guardian said, "It was a rollercoaster" and the most surprising docuseries of the summer.

The Hollywood Reporter said it was, "An effectively indignation-inducing true crime tale."

Michael Morton, who was mentioned in Outcry as also having been wrongfully convicted, expressed that the way the prosecutors are being presented in Outcry is problematic.

Decider considered whether to "Stream It Or Skip It" and called to "Stream It" as did 73.5% on their Twitter poll.

Lawyer Robert Barnes highly recommends Outcry, stating, "What's also still unsettling is that even Texas Rangers and high-ranking law enforcement officers still don't know how to prosecute a child abuse case."

== See also ==
- A follow-up documentary, The Return to Huntsville - Rocky Raccoon 100, was produced by The Vindication Foundation, and directed by Jacob Grehl. The 2 hour film describes Greg Kelley returning to the same prison, the Wynne Unit, after 10 years, and running the Rocky Raccoon 100 Mile Ultra in Huntsville, Texas, as part of a healing journey.
- The Confession Killer, also involves problems with the Texas Rangers.
- The Scheme (2020 film), also directed by Pat Kondelis, is a documentary on basketball insider Christian Dawkins, who hustled the FBI in a scandal that threatened to take down the NCAA.
- The Radical Story of Patty Hearst, another 2018 documentary mini-series directed Pat Kondelis, is about the transformation of Patty Hearst from kidnapped heiress to well-known terrorist is a saga of privilege, celebrity and violence, from firsthand accounts over forty years later.
- Disgraced (2017 film), also written/directed/produced by Pat Kondelis, is an Emmy Award winning Showtime documentary on the 2003 murder of Baylor University basketball player Patrick Dennehy, the NCAA, and its scandal with Dave Bliss.
- Innocent prisoner's dilemma
- The Innocence Project
- List of wrongful convictions in the United States
