= Madeline-Ann Aksich =

Canadian businesswoman, philanthropist, artist

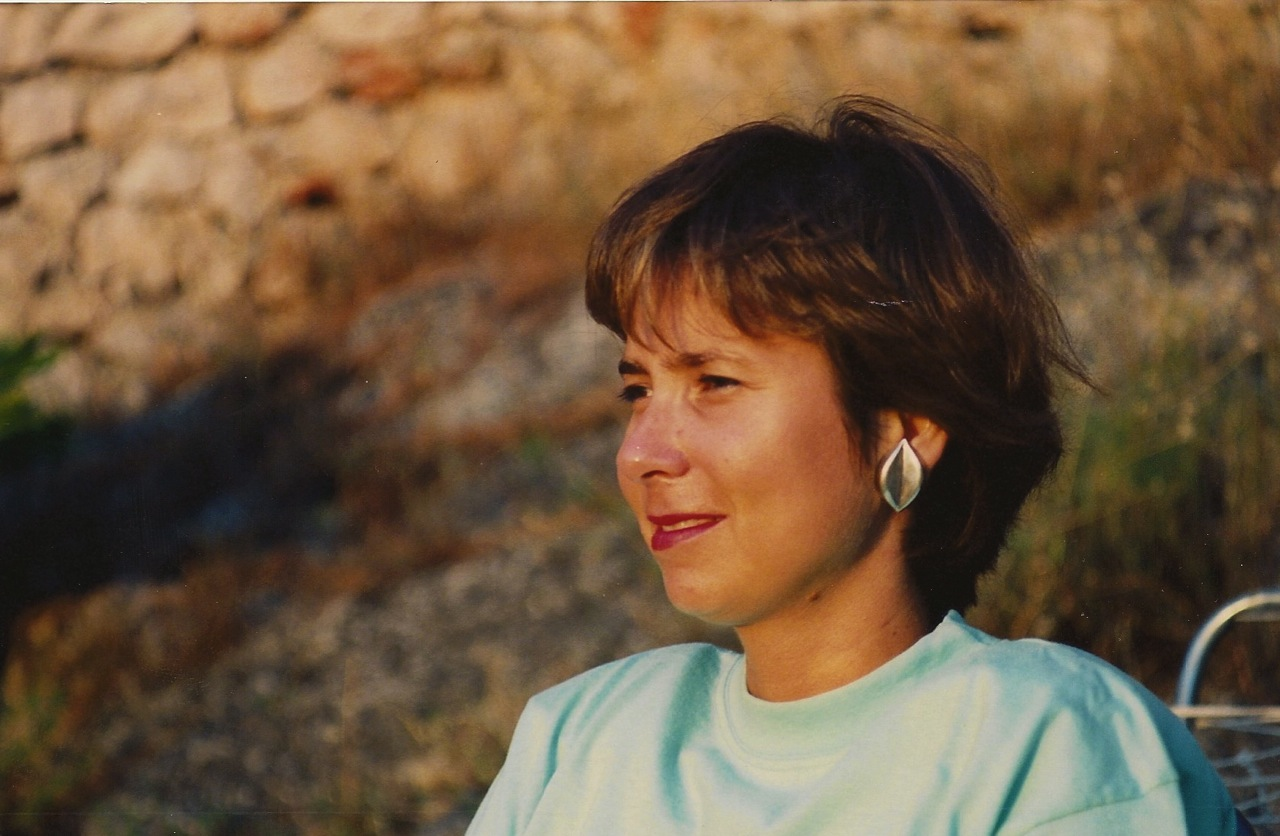
Madeline-Ann Aksich

Madeline-Ann Aksich, CM (1956 – September 25, 2005) was a Canadian businesswoman, philanthropist, artist and founder of the International Children's Institute. On May 1, 2001 she was appointed to the Order of Canada for her humanitarian work. After her death, she was remembered in the House of Commons by MP Francis Scarpaleggia. The Madeline-Ann Aksich Visual Arts Studio at Marianopolis College is named in her honour.
