= Philémon Cousineau =

Canadian politician (1874–1959)

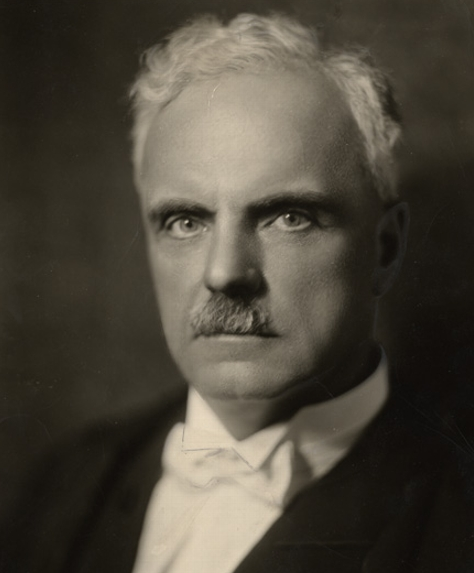

Member of the Legislative Assembly of Quebec for Jacques-Cartier
- In office 1908–1916
- Preceded by: Joseph-Adolphe Chauret
- Succeeded by: Joseph-Séraphin-Aimé Ashby

Personal details
- Born: October 25, 1874 Saint-Laurent, Quebec
- Died: March 3, 1959 (aged 84) Saint-Laurent, Quebec
- Party: Conservative

Philémon Cousineau (October 25, 1874 – March 3, 1959) was a Canadian politician born in Saint-Laurent (today part of Montreal).

== Career ==
He was mayor of St-Laurent from 1905 to 1909, and Quebec Conservative Party leader from 1915 to 1916. He resigned following his defeat in the 1916 Quebec provincial election in the riding of Jacques-Cartier which he was the member for eight years. In 1920 he became a Quebec Superior Court judge.

He became Dean of the law faculty of the University of Montreal and emeritus professor. He was an associate of Batonnier De Sales Bastien, and became President of the Mount Royal Telephone Co. and of the St. Lawrence Tobacco Co., board director of Saraguay Light & Power Co., and member of the Canadian Club and Lafontaine Club of Montreal.

== See also ==
- Politics of Quebec
- List of Quebec general elections
- List of Quebec leaders of the Opposition
- Timeline of Quebec history
