= François-Saturnin Lascaris d'Urfé =

Sulpician missionary of New France (1641–1701)

Arms of the Urfé family: Vair a chief gules

François-Saturnin Lascaris d'Urfé, S.S. (1641 – June 30, 1701) was a French nobleman and Sulpician priest who became the first resident pastor of the parish of Saint-Louis-du-Haut-de-l'Île (in what is now the town of Baie-D'Urfé) on the Island of Montreal in New France.

== Life and career ==
Born into a prominent family of the French nobility, Lascaris d'Urfé held the title of Marquis de Baugé and was the brother of Louis Lascaris d'Urfé, who served from 1676 to 1695 as Bishop of Limoges. In 1660, Lascaris d'Urfé was admitted to the seminary of Saint-Sulpice in Paris and was ordained in 1665. He was sent as a missionary to New France in 1668.

In 1669, he accompanied his cousin, François de Salignac de la Mothe-Fénelon, to the Iroquois mission at Kenté, on Lake Ontario. In 1672, Fénelon was to establish an Algonquin mission on the outskirts of Ville-Marie at a place called Gentilly. Lascaris d'Urfé replaced his cousin there in 1674. His support for Fénelon gave rise to his own problems with Governor Frontenac. Lascaris d'Urfé accompanied Fénelon back to France, where he wrote to Minister of Finance Jean-Baptiste Colbert (whose daughter-in-law was Lascaris d'Urfé's first cousin) of his mail being opened and other slights.

Lascaris d'Urfé returned to Quebec in 1686, and soon after re-joined the Sulpicians at Montreal. He then founded the mission of Saint-Louis-du-Haut-de-l'Île in the west end of Montreal Island at Pointe-Caron (site of the present-day Baie-D'Urfé Yacht Club). It was a small community of settlers, soldiers, traders, and Indians. At that time, the mission included the entire area from the tip of Montreal Island to Pointe-Claire, Île Perrot, Soulanges, Vaudreuil, and Île aux Tourtes. The mission was attacked by the Iroquois in 1687. The town of Baie-D'Urfé is named after Abbé d'Urfé.

After serving in Canada for nineteen years, Lascaris d'Urfé returned to France in 1687 to deal with family matters. He was subsequently appointed as Dean of Cathédrale Notre-Dame in Puy-en-Velay. In addition, he served as Abbé of Uzerche from 1695 to 1701. Lascaris d'Urfé died in 1701 at his château of Baugé.
