= Baie-D'Urfé =

- Town
- Town of Baie-D'Urfé
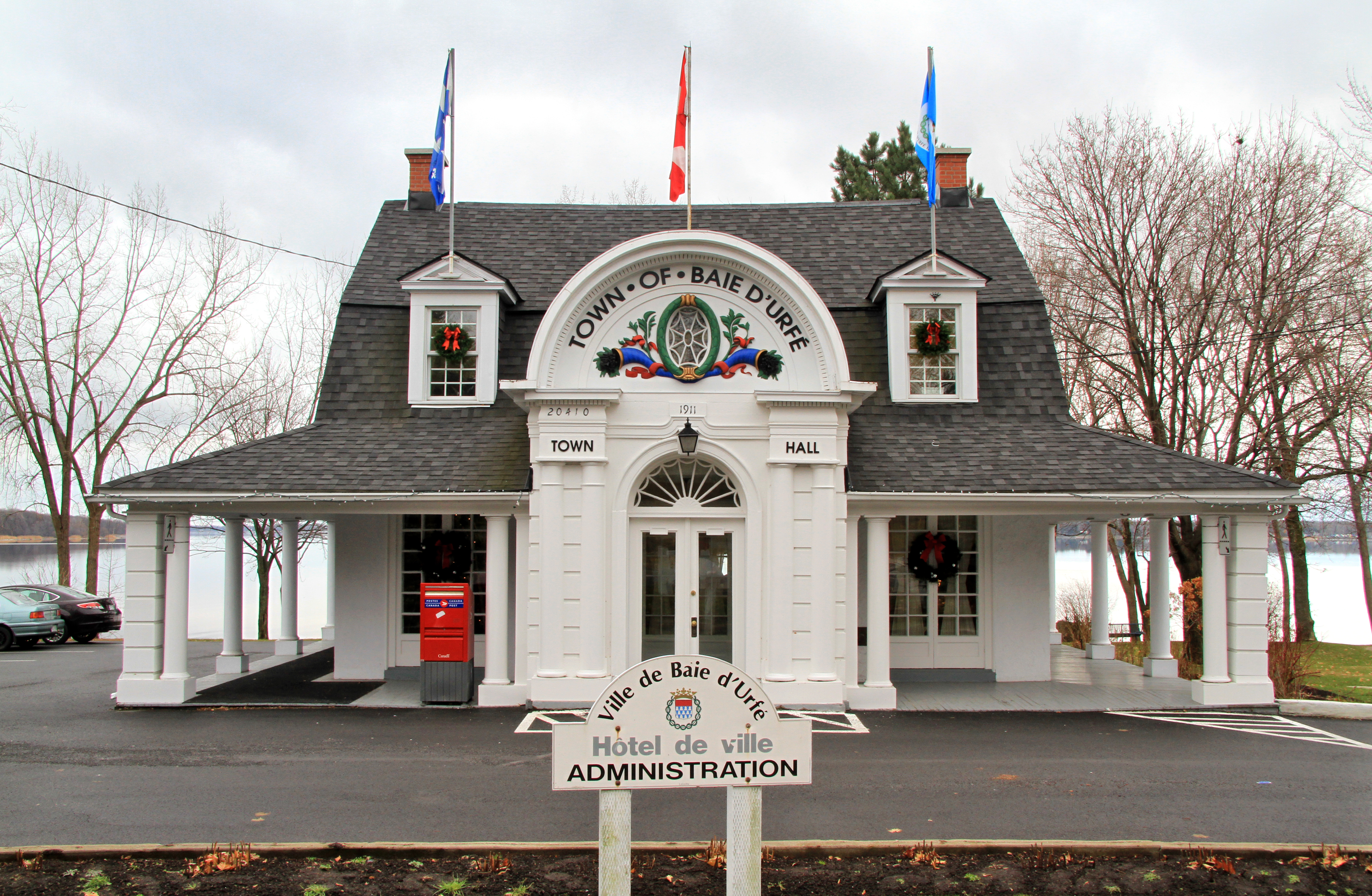
- The town hall of Baie-D'Urfé

- Coat of arms

- Location on the Island of Montreal. (Outlined areas indicate demerged municipalities).

- Location in southern Quebec
- Coordinates: 45°25′N 73°55′W
- Country: Canada
- Province: Quebec
- Region: Montréal
- RCM: None
- Founded: 1686
- Town charter: March 1911
- Merged into Beaconsfield–Baie-D'Urfé: January 1, 2002
- Reconstituted: January 1, 2006
- Named for: François-Saturnin Lascaris d'Urfé

Government
  - Mayor: Heidi Ektvedt
  - Federal riding: Lac-Saint-Louis
  - Prov. riding: Jacques-Cartier

Area
  - Total: 8.03 km^{2} (3.10 sq mi)
  - Land: 6.03 km^{2} (2.33 sq mi)

Population (2021)
  - Total: 3,764
  - Density: 623.9/km^{2} (1,616/sq mi)
  - Pop 2016-2021: ▼1.5%
  - Dwellings: 1,375
- Time zone: UTC−5 (EST)
  - Summer (DST): UTC−4 (EDT)
- Postal code(s): H9X
- Area codes: 514 and 438
- Highways A-20: A-40 (TCH)
- Website: baie-durfe.qc.ca

Baie-D'Urfé (Canadian French: [be d͡zʏʁˈfe]; previously spelled Baie d'Urfé or Baie d'Urfee) is an on-island suburb of Montreal, Quebec, Canada. It is part of the West Island area of the Island of Montreal.

As part of the 2002–2006 municipal reorganization of Montreal, Baie-D'Urfé was merged into the city of Montreal on January 1, 2002, joining with neighbouring Beaconsfield to create the borough of Beaconsfield–Baie-D'Urfé. After a change of provincial government in 2003 and a provincial referendum in 2004, Beaconsfield and Baie-D'Urfé both voted to demerge and were reconstituted as independent municipalities on January 1, 2006. However, they remain part of the urban agglomeration of Montreal.

Baie-D'Urfé is named after François-Saturnin Lascaris d'Urfé, a French Sulpician priest known as l'Abbé d'Urfé. He was the community's first pastor, who was sent by the Gentlemen of Saint-Sulpice to serve as a missionary for the parish of Saint-Louis-du-Bout-de-l'Île (which was later renamed in his honour), a small community of settlers, soldiers, traders, and Indians.

The town's name went through several typographical changes: prior to 2002, the town's name was written as Baie-d'Urfé (no capital "d"); prior to 1969, place names in Quebec were not hyphenated; and prior to 1960, its original name was officially spelled Baie d'Urfée.

== Geography ==
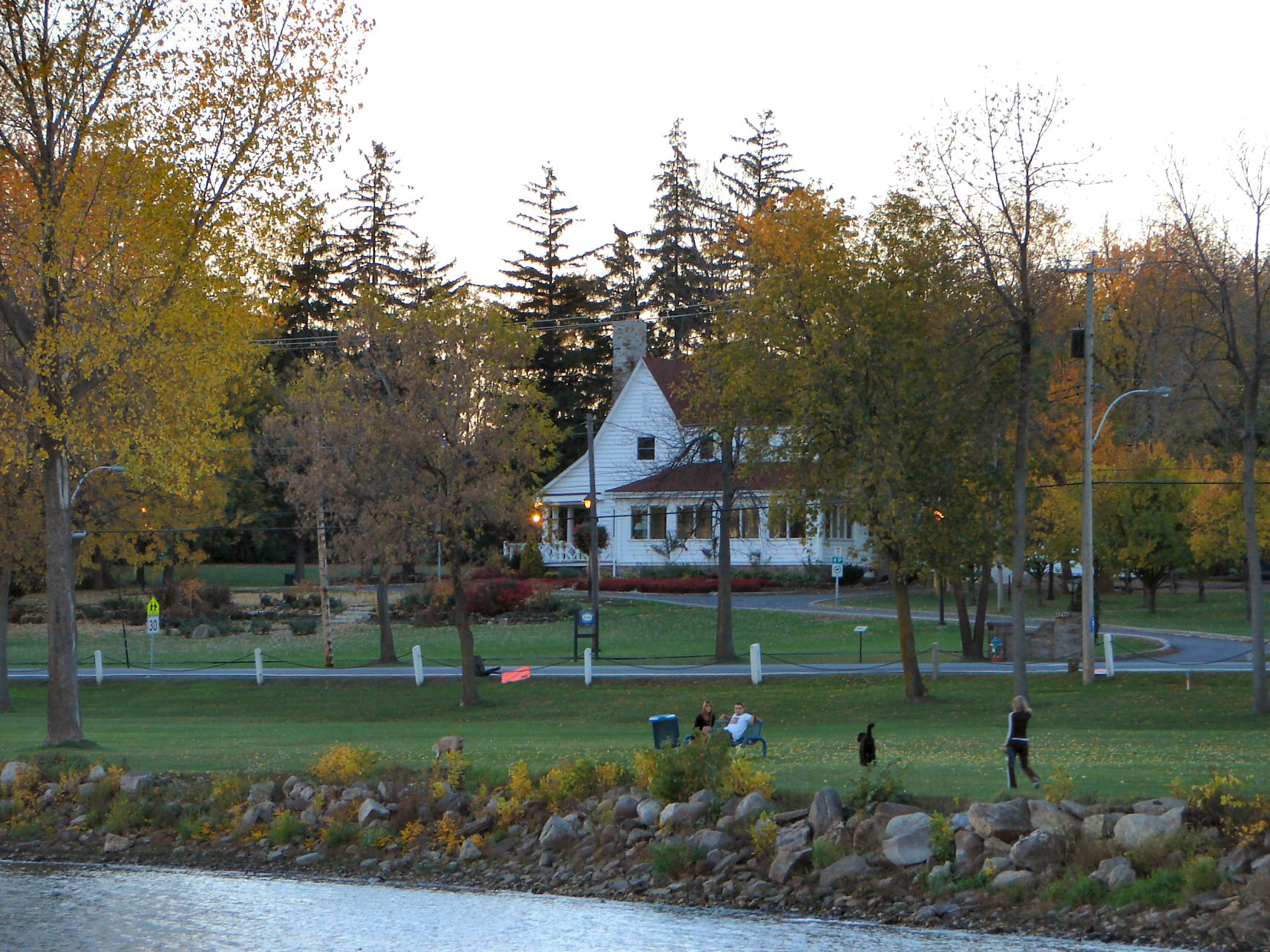
Waterfront in Baie-D'Urfé with Fritz Farm Community Centre

Baie-D'Urfé is largely a "bedroom community" that extends from Autoroute 40 to Lac Saint-Louis. It is composed of both a residential and industrial sector. The residential sector is characterized by a wide range of house types and sizes, all based on spacious lots. The residential section of the municipality has retained a rural charm, accentuated by its lack of sidewalks and limited commercial activity. It is a favourite spot for boaters, who use either the local yacht or boat clubs. The community is within the part of the Island of Montreal locally referred to as the West Island. North of Autoroute 20 and the CN and CP railway lines lies a modest-sized industrial park. The industrial park, covering approximately a third of the town's land area, is somewhat isolated from the rest of the town, features its own off-hours security patrol, and is home to a number of large industrial firms' operations.

== Demographics ==
Historical census populations – Baie-D'Urfé
Year	Pop.	±%
1921	172	—
1931	211	+22.7%
1941	236	+11.8%
1951	719	+204.7%
1956	1,838	+155.6%
1961	3,549	+93.1%
1966	4,061	+14.4%
1971	3,881	−4.4%
1976	3,955	+1.9%
1981	3,674	−7.1%
1986	3,571	−2.8%
1991	3,849	+7.8%
1996	3,774	−1.9%
2001	3,813	+1.0%
2006	3,902	+2.3%
2011	3,850	−1.3%
2016	3,823	−0.7%
2021	3,764	−1.5%
Source: Statistics Canada

According to the Office québécois de la langue française, Baie-D'Urfé has been officially recognized as a bilingual municipality since 2005-11-02.

In the 2021 Census of Population conducted by Statistics Canada, Baie-D'Urfé had a population of 3,764 living in 1,325 of its 1,375 total private dwellings, a change of −1.5% from its 2016 population of 3,823. With a land area of 6.03 km^{2} (2.33 sq mi), it had a population density of 624.2/km^{2} (1,616.7/sq mi) in 2021.

Canada census – Baie-D'Urfé community profile

	2021	2016	2011
Population	3,764 (-1.5% from 2016)	3,823 (-0.7% from 2011)	3,850 (-1.3% from 2006)
Land area	6.03 km^{2} (2.33 sq mi)	6.03 km^{2} (2.33 sq mi)	6.03 km^{2} (2.33 sq mi)
Population density	623.9/km^{2} (1,616/sq mi)	633.9/km^{2} (1,642/sq mi)	638.8/km^{2} (1,654/sq mi)
Median age	50.4 (M: 49.6, F: 50.8)	49.0 (M: 49.1, F: 49.0)	46.5 (M: 46.8, F: 46.3)
Private dwellings	1,375 (total) 1,325 (occupied)	1,381 (total)	1,423 (total)
Median household income	$145,000	$118,784	$108,399

References: 2021 2016 2011

Home Language (2021)
Language	Population	Percentage (%)
English	2,625	70%
French	560	15%
Other	350	9%

Mother Tongue (2021)
Language	Population	Percentage (%)
English	1,930	51%
French	740	20%
Other	825	22%

Visible Minorities (2021)
Ethnicity	Population	Percentage (%)
Not a visible minority	3,135	85.7%
Visible minorities	525	14.3%

Baie-D'Urfé competes with a few other suburbs for top spot in the rankings of highest average household incomes in Canada. The median income for a household in Baie-D'Urfé was $128,611, and the median income for a family was $194,335. Males had an average income of $112,882, compared to $62,245 for females.

== Sports ==
The town's active community members participate in many of the town's associated or private clubs, including the Baie-D'Urfé Curling Club.

== Government ==
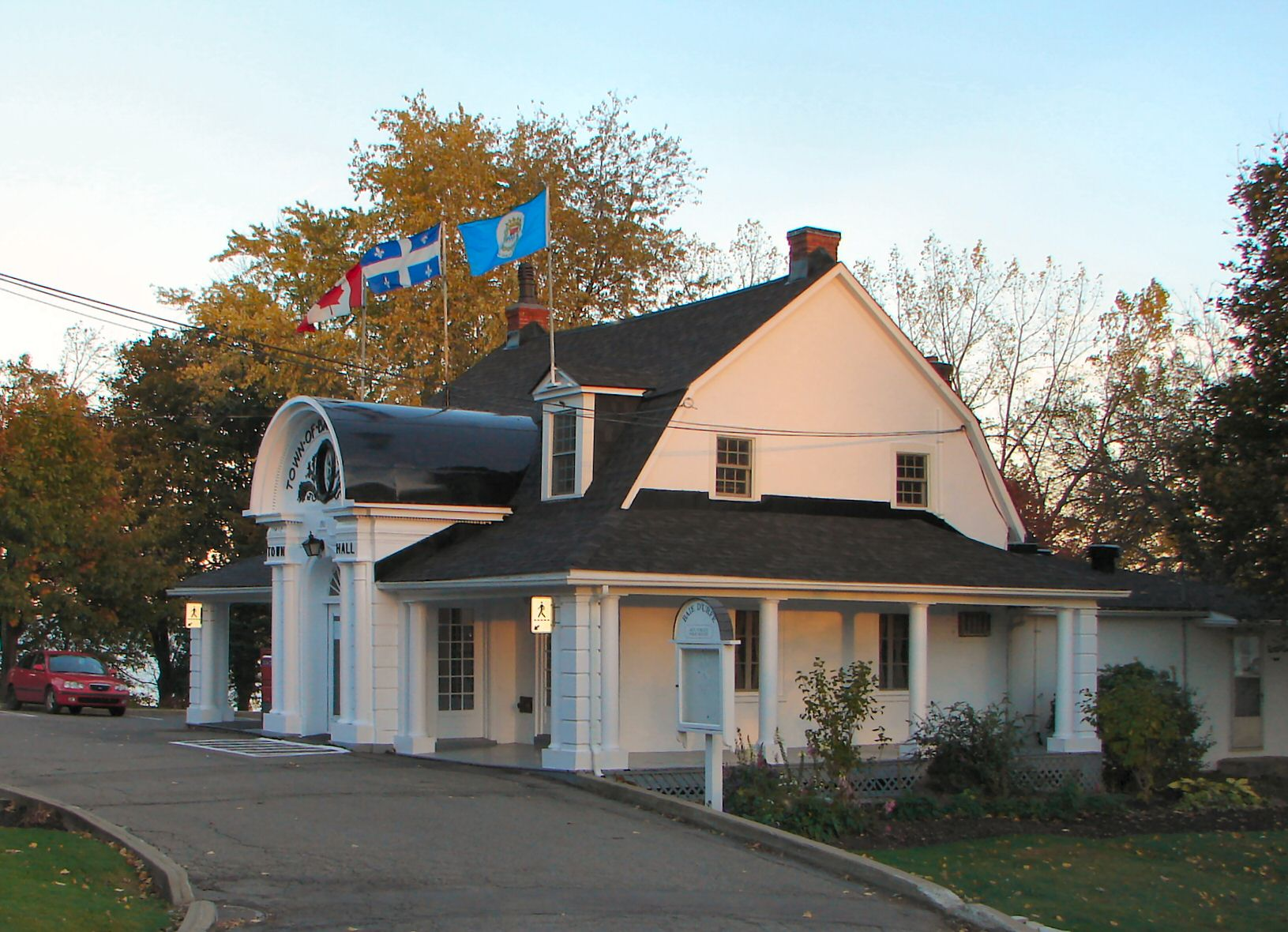
The town hall opened in 1914 after renovations designed by local resident Edward Maxwell

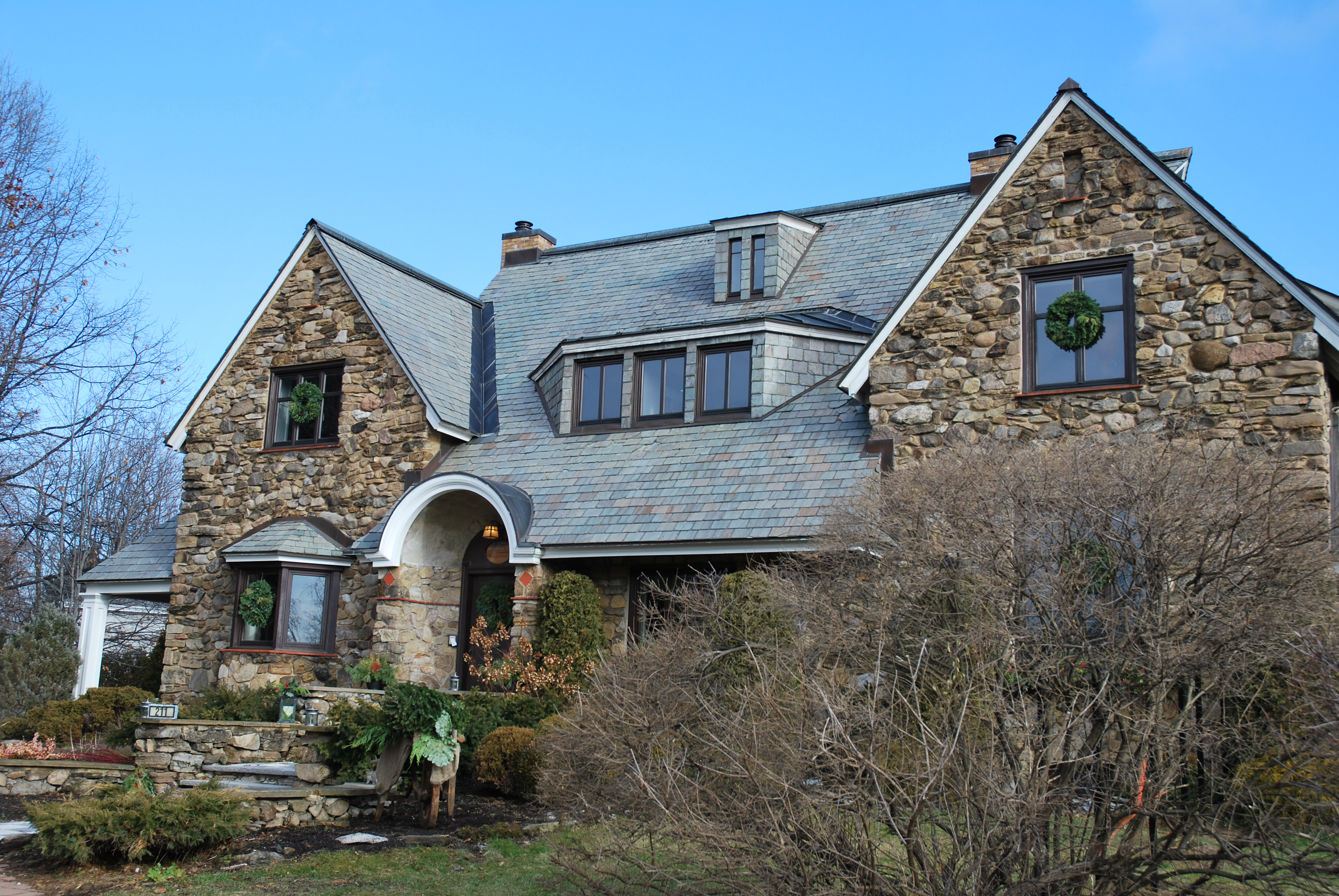
Maxwelton, built in 1910 as a country house for Edward Maxwell and his family

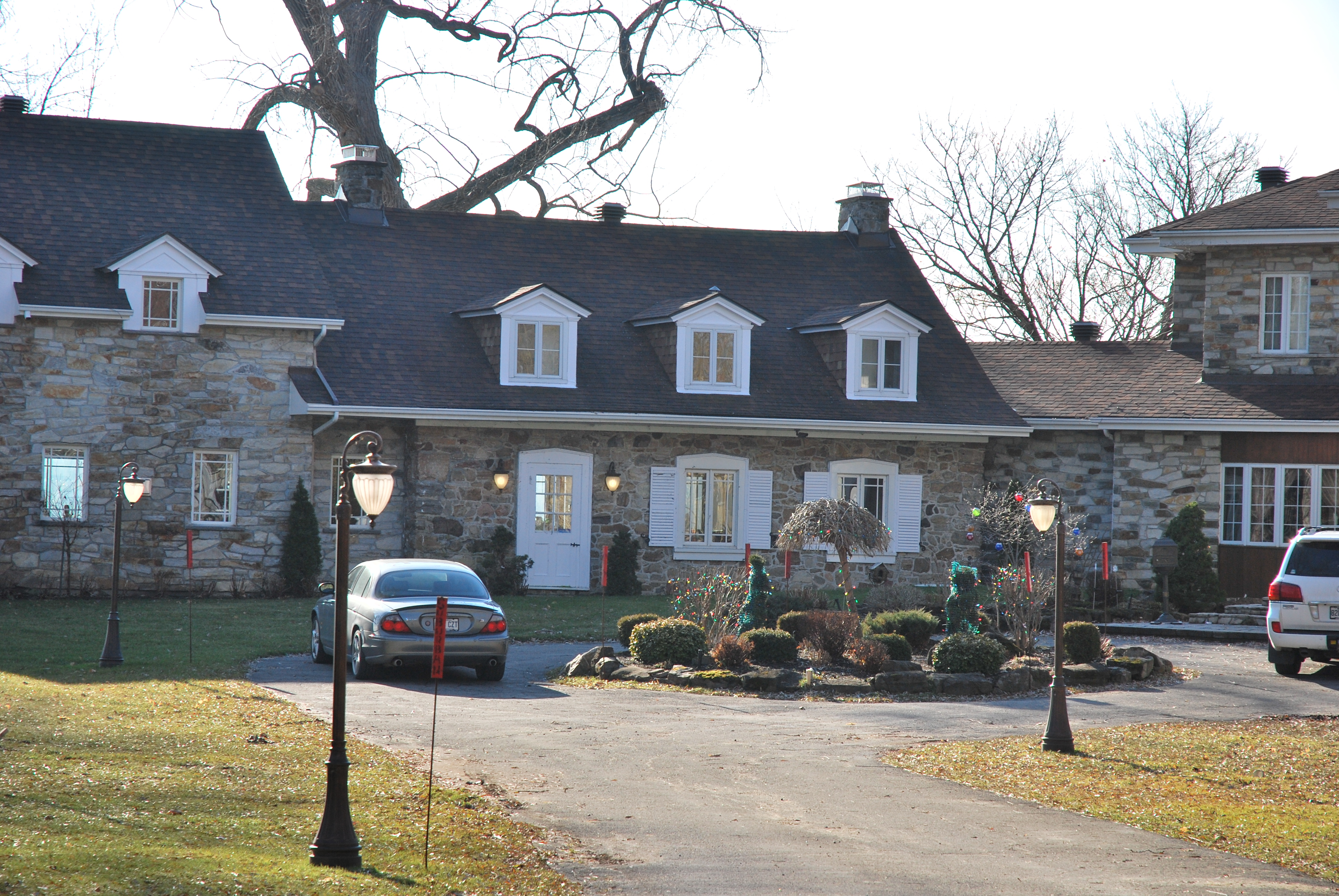
20746 Gay Cedars Drive, part of which dates back to the 18th century

The current mayor of Baie-D'Urfé is Heidi Ektvedt.

There are six Town Councillors:

1. Nadia Bissada
2. Tony Brown
3. Brigitte Chartrand
4. Stephen Gruber
5. Wanda Lowensteyn
6. Tom Thompson

Baie-D'Urfé is the first town in Canada to have a youth council; this consists of young people aged 10 years and up, and is entitled the Junior Council. It was established in 2008. The town celebrated its centennial in 2011, and the Junior Council re-enacted two of the town's earliest council meetings (which had been held originally on July 18 and September 16, 1911, respectively).

=== List for former mayors ===
List of former mayors:

- Vivian de Vere Dowker (1911–1917)
- Fred. J. Shaw (1917–1925)
- John Watterson (1925–1931)
- Erastus W. Wilson (1931–1933)
- Walter Maughan (1933–1935, 1937–1941, 1943–1945)
- C. J. Smith (1935–1937)
- Alexander Howard Pirie (1941–1943)
- W. Frederic MacBride (1945–1947)
- Frederic W. Case (1947–1951)
- Jean Gélinas (1951–1955)
- William Harvey Cruickshank (1955–1957)
- Thomas Roche Lee (1957–1961)
- Lars J. Firing (1961–1965)
- A. Clark Graham (1965–1977)
- David H. Kennedy (1977–1983)
- Anne Myles (1983–2002)
- Maria Tutino (2006–2020)
- Heidi Ektvedt (2020–present)

== Education ==
The Centre de services scolaire Marguerite-Bourgeoys operates Francophone public schools that, until June 15, 2020, were operated by the Commission scolaire Marguerite-Bourgeoys. The change was a result of a law passed by the Quebec government that changed the school board system from denominational to linguistic. École primaire Joseph-Henrico is located in the city.

The Lester B. Pearson School Board operates English-language public schools. Dorset Elementary School is in the city. A portion is zoned to Christmas Park Elementary School and St. Edmund Elementary School in Beaconsfield.

The Alexander von Humboldt Schule Montréal, a private German international school, is in the town.

== See also ==
- Dowker Island
- List of anglophone communities in Quebec
- List of former boroughs
- Montreal Merger
- Municipal reorganization in Quebec
