= Greg Kelley (politician) =

Canadian politician

Greg Kelley MNA

Member of the National Assembly of Quebec for Jacques-Cartier
- Incumbent
- Assumed office October 1, 2018
- Preceded by: Geoffrey Kelley

Personal details
- Born: Gregory Kelley; 1985 (age 40–41) Montreal
- Party: Quebec Liberal Party
- Spouse: Marwah Rizqy (m. 2021)
- Profession: politician

Gregory Kelley is a Canadian politician who was elected to the National Assembly of Quebec in the 2018 provincial election. He represents the electoral district of Jacques-Cartier as a member of the Quebec Liberal Party.

He is the son of Geoffrey Kelley, his predecessor as MNA for the district.

As of September 7, 2024, he serves as the critic for Energy, Natural Resources, Relations with English-speaking Quebecers, and Côte-Nord.

== Personal life ==
Born in Montreal in 1985, Kelly was educated at Beaconsfield High School (Quebec), John Abbott College, McGill University (BA in 2009) and Queen's University (MPA in 2010.)

In June 2021, Kelley announced his upcoming wedding to fellow Assembly member Marwah Rizqy; this is the first marriage between two sitting members of the Assembly. Their first child, Gabriel, was born on October 6, 2022.

== Electoral record ==
2022 Quebec general election: Jacques-Cartier
Party	Candidate	Votes	%	±%
Liberal	Greg Kelley	18,158	62.57	-9.24
Conservative	Louis-Charles Fortier	3,260	11.23	+8.64
Coalition Avenir Québec	Rébecca Guénard-Chouinard	2,735	9.42	+0.10
Canadian	Arthur Fischer	1,462	5.04	–
Québec solidaire	Marie-Ève Mathieu	1,456	5.02	+0.63
Green	Virginie Beaudet	1,074	3.70	-3.03
Parti Québécois	Chantal Beauregard	877	3.02	+0.25
Total valid votes		29,022	99.35	–
Total rejected ballots		190	0.65	–
Turnout		29,212	63.17	-1.94
Electors on the lists		46,245	–	–

2018 Quebec general election: Jacques-Cartier
Party	Candidate	Votes	%	±%
Liberal	Gregory Kelley	21,133	71.81	-13.61
Coalition Avenir Québec	Karen Hilchey	2,744	9.32	+3.42
Green	Catherine Polson	1,981	6.73	+4.08
Québec solidaire	Nicolas Chatel-Launay	1,291	4.39	+2.02
Parti Québécois	Martine Bourgeois	815	2.77	-0.22
Conservative	Louis-Charles Fortier	762	2.59	+1.95
New Democratic	France Séguin	555	1.89	
Independent	Teodor Daiev	78	0.27	
Citoyens au pouvoir	Cynthia Bouchard	72	0.24	
Total valid votes		29,431	99.37	
Total rejected ballots		186	0.63	
Turnout		29,617	65.11	
Eligible voters		45,490		
Liberal hold		Swing		-8.52
Source(s) "Rapport des résultats officiels du scrutin". Élections Québec.
