= Macdonald School =

Macdonald School may refer to:

- Archbishop MacDonald High School, Edmonton, AB, Canada
- W. Ross Macdonald School, Brantford, ON, Canada
- Sir John A. Macdonald High School, Halifax, NS, Canada
- Laurier Macdonald High School, Montreal, QC, Canada
- Sir John A. Macdonald Secondary School (Waterloo, Ontario), Canada
- Sir William MacDonald Elementary School, Vancouver, BC, Canada
- Sir John A Macdonald Junior High School, Calgary, AB, Canada
- Sir John A. Macdonald Secondary School (Hamilton, Ontario), Canada
- Macdonald High School, Sainte-Anne-de-Bellevue, QC, Canada
- Macdonald-Cartier High School, Saint-Hubert, QC, Canada
- Sir John A. Macdonald Collegiate Institute, Agincourt, Scarborough, Toronto, ON, Canada

== See also ==
- John A. Macdonald
- Macdonald Elementary School (disambiguation)
- The McDonald College, an independent school in Sydney, Australia
