= St. Anthony Elementary School =

St. Anthony Elementary School may refer to:

- An elementary school in Toronto
- An elementary school in Montreal
