= Beurling Academy =

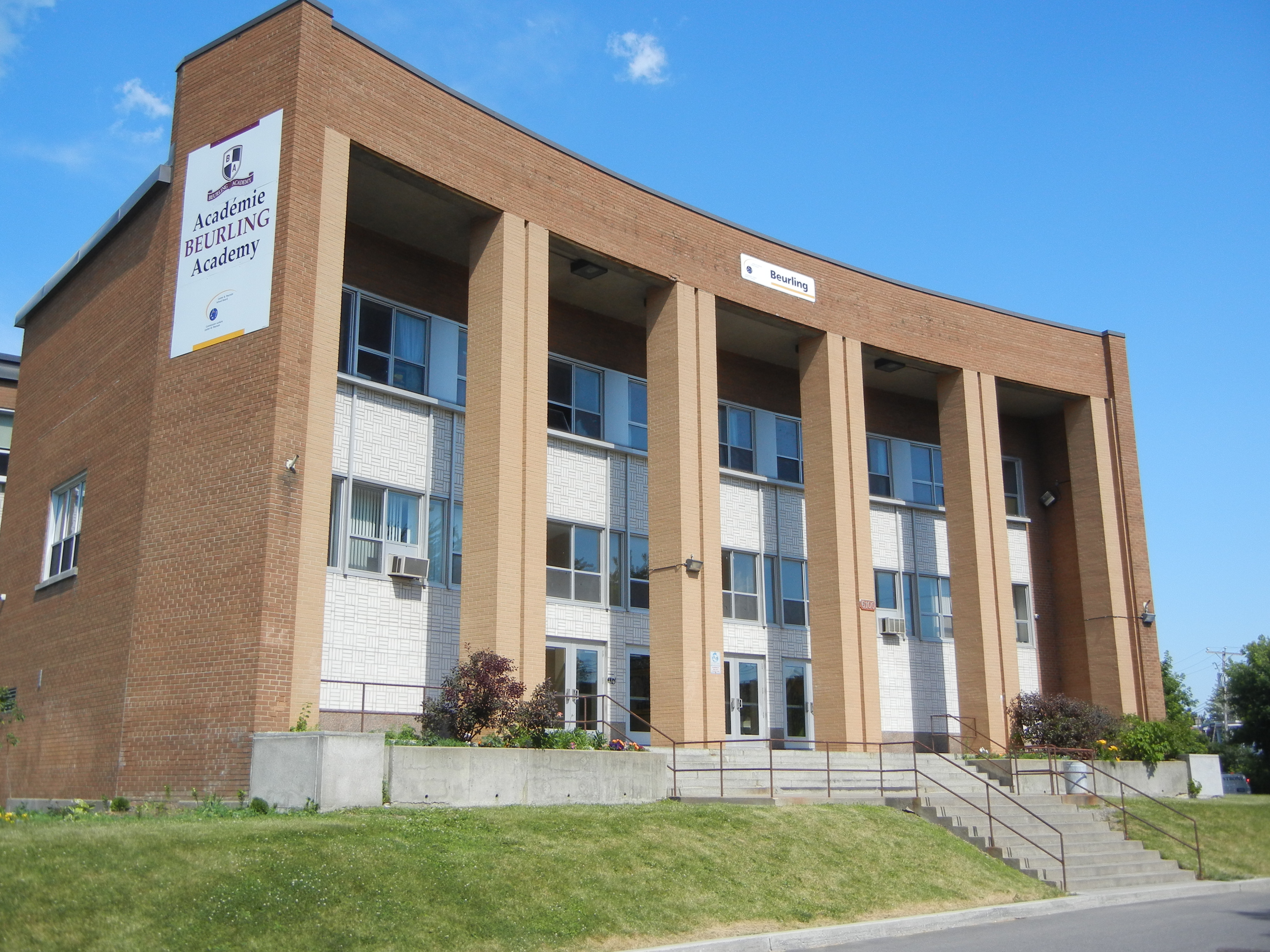

Location
- 6100 Champlain Boulevard; Verdun, Quebec, H4H 1A5; Canada; 45.4481°N 73.5864°W

Information
- School type: Public, Secondary School
- Motto: Believe and Succeed
- Founded: 2003
- School board: Lester B. Pearson School Board
- School number: 514-766-2357
- Grades: 7-11
- Enrollment: 400
- Language: English, French
- Area: Verdun, LaSalle
- Colours: Burgundy and Grey (Formerly Black, White and Red)
- Mascot: Bobcat
- Team name: Beurling Bobcats
- Website: beurling.lbpsb.qc.ca

Beurling Academy (French: Académie Beurling) is a high school located in Montreal, Quebec, Canada. It is located at 6100 Champlain Boulevard in the borough of Verdun. It serves both the borough of Verdun, and the southeastern parts of neighbouring borough LaSalle. It is a part of the Lester B. Pearson School Board.

Beurling Academy was named for Verdun-native George "Buzz" Beurling, the most successful Canadian fighter pilot of the Second World War.

Beurling Academy opened in 2003 as a result of a merger between Riverside Park Academy and LaSalle Junior International School. When it opened it had 580 students, now, that number has dropped to 400.

The school offers two programs: Regular/English; and International Baccalaureate (Middle Years Program and Regular IB)

As of 2012, the school has begun accommodating international students in the Middle Years Program. The curriculum is nearly identical to that of Canadian MYP students, though it is more personalized.
