= Jonathan Malo =

Canadian baseball player (born 1983)

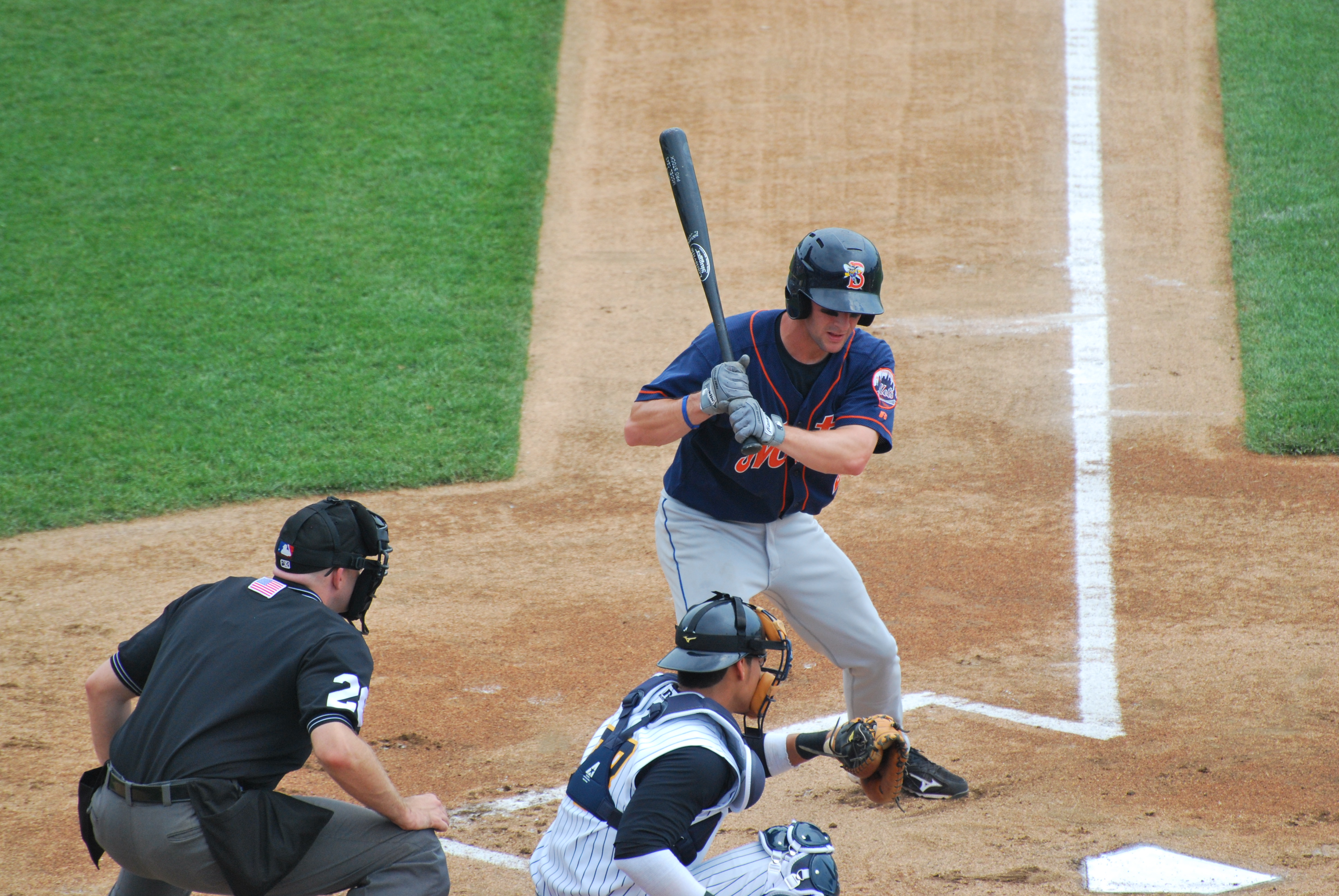
- Malo with the Binghamton Mets
- Shortstop
- Born: September 29, 1983 (age 42); Saint-Roch-de-l'Achigan, Quebec, Canada
- Bats: Right Throws: Right
- Stats at Baseball Reference
Medals
Men's baseball
Representing Canada
Baseball World Cup
Bronze medal – third place	2009 Nettuno	Team
Bronze medal – third place	2011 Panama City	Team
Pan American Games
Gold medal – first place	2011 Guadalajara	Team
Silver medal – second place	2019 Lima	Team

Jonathan Joseph Malo (born September 29, 1983) is a Canadian former professional baseball shortstop. Malo has competed for the Canada national baseball team.

== Career ==
Malo went to Collège Montmorency. He enrolled at Miami-Dade College, before transferring to Northeastern Oklahoma A&M College. He also played for the Associés de Laval of the Ligue de Baseball Élite du Québec, a collegiate summer baseball league, from 2001 through 2003.

The Mets drafted Malo in the 40th round (1,197th overall) of the 2002 Major League Baseball draft, but he did not sign, opting to college. They drafted him again in the 48th round (1,413rd overall) of the 2003 Major League Baseball draft, and again did not sign. He signed with the Mets as an undrafted free agent in 2004. He made his professional debut with the Brooklyn Cyclones of the Low–A New York–Penn League in 2005. He played for the St. Lucie Mets of the High–A Florida State League in 2006, winning the league championship. He was promoted to the Binghamton Mets of the Double–A Eastern League for the first time in 2008. He split the 2009, 2010, and 2011 seasons between the Binghamton Mets and the Buffalo Bisons of the Triple–A International League. In 2012, he played for the Québec Capitales of the Canadian-American Association. Malo was a member of the Capitales through the 2019 season, hitting .281/.360/.402 with 39 home runs and 247 RBI in 8 seasons with the club.

== International career ==
Malo was selected for the Canada national baseball team at the 2009 Baseball World Cup, 2011 Pan American Games, 2011 Baseball World Cup, 2013 World Baseball Classic, 2017 World Baseball Classic, 2019 Pan American Games and 2019 WBSC Premier12.

In the 2009 Baseball World Cup, winning the bronze medal.

In 2011, he participated in the 2011 Pan American Games, winning the gold medal, and the 2011 Baseball World Cup, in which he was named to the All-Tournament Team.
