= Lakeside Academy (Lachine) =

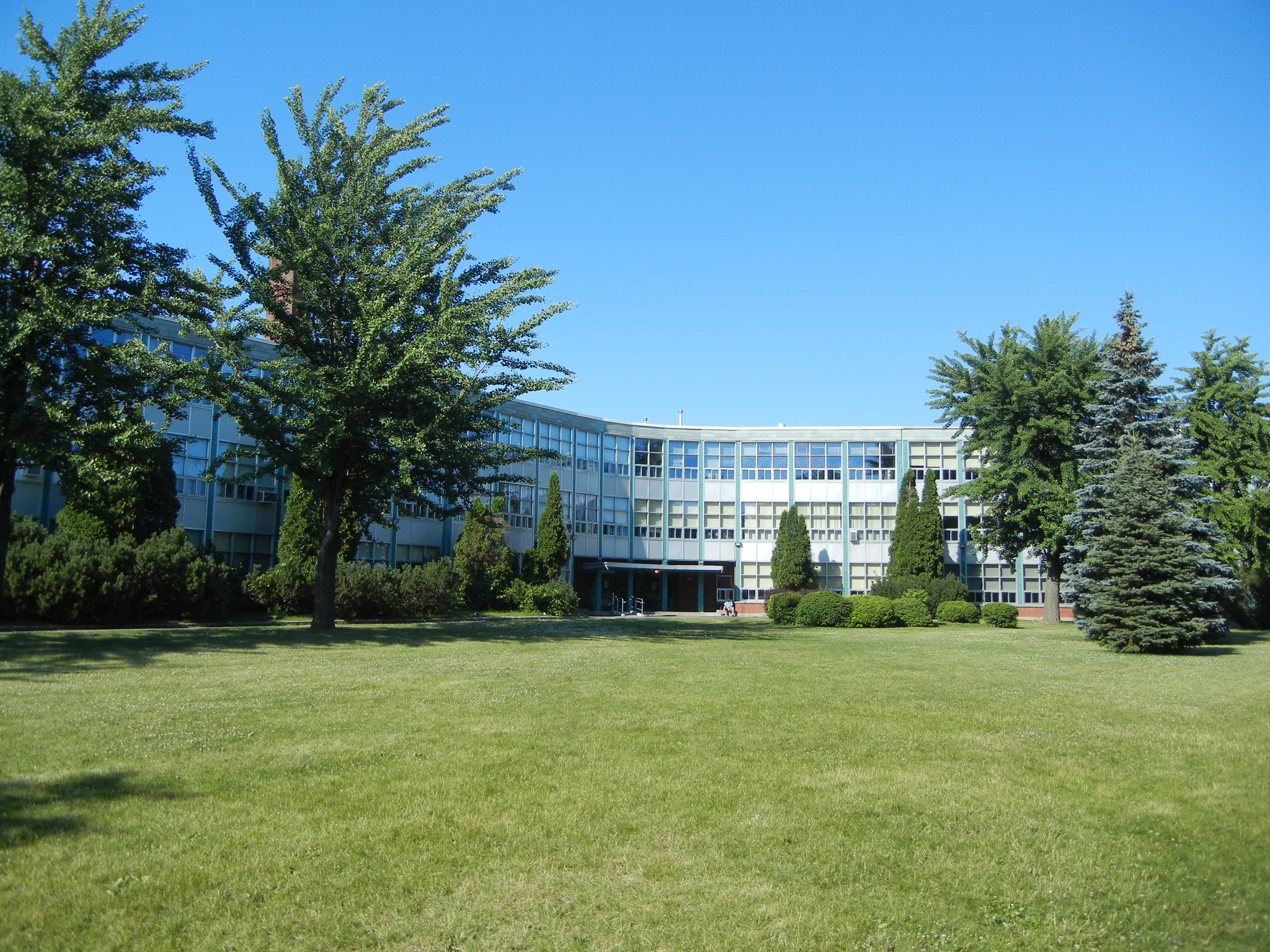

Location
- 5050 Sherbrooke Street; Lachine, Quebec, H8T 1H8; Canada; 45°26′44.12″N 73°42′49.24″W

Information
- School type: Public, Secondary School
- Founded: 2001
- School board: Lester B. Pearson School Board
- Principal: Maggie Wilkonson
- Grades: Secondary I-V
- Enrollment: 729 (2008)
- Language: English
- Campus: Suburban
- Colours: Blue and white
- Yearbook: Phoenix
- Website: lakesideacademy.lbpsb.qc.ca

Lakeside Academy (French: Académie Lakeside) is a public secondary school in the borough of Lachine of Montreal, Quebec, Canada. Part of the Lester B. Pearson School Board, the school was created in 2001 when two former high schools, Lachine High School and Bishop Whelan High School, were amalgamated. Lakeside has offered the International Baccalaureate Middle Years Program (IBMYP or IB)since 2001 to the Enriched students and to all its students since 2010, and it served as the set for the 2009 film The Trotsky.

The communities that have the majority of students include the Montreal boroughs of Lachine, LaSalle, and Verdun; and the municipalities of Dorval, Kahnawake, and Montreal West.

It offers many extra curricular sports - volleyball, soccer, touch football, flag football, rugby, basketball, indoor soccer, badminton, track and field and swimming. Every year the school puts on a play, a variety show and a music concert. It also has FIRST Robotics Competition team and a FIRST LEGO League team. In 2016, the school incorporated robotics into its Secondary 1 curriculum.

In 2012, the school hosted a fundraiser with The Montreal Jubilation Gospel Choir.

The school was slated with closure on the 30 June 2016. However, community groups joined together to convince Lester B Pearson school board to change this decision. On the 26 January 2016 the school won a reprieve to stay open for an extra 12 months. In June 2016 the decision was completely overturned and in September 2016 the school started the school year knowing it was safe from closure.

Lakeside (under the informal name "Lachine High") was featured in a humorous anecdote by Matt Kowalewski of the Best Friends Zaibatsu during a Let's Play of Sonic Adventure. In the anecdote, Kowalewski asks his classmates if they "are ready" for an unspecified event.
