= Associés de Laval =

- Logo

Information
- League: Ligue de Baseball Élite du Québec
- Location: Laval, Quebec
- Ballpark: Parc Montmorency
- Founded: 1983
- Former name(s): Associés de Laval; Aigles de Laval; Concorde de Laval
- Colours: Navy Blue, Red, White
- Ownership: LBEQ
- General manager: Michel Fournier
- Manager: Mario Loyer
- Media: Courrier Laval
- Website: web.archive.org/web/20080619193112/http://www.associesdelaval.qc.ca:80/

The Laval Associés (French: Associés de Laval) were Laval's baseball team in the Ligue de Baseball Élite du Québec. They played at Montmorency Park in the Laval-des-Rapides neighbourhood.

In 2015, the team was replaced by the Pirates de Laval.

== Former players ==
- Jonathan Malo, New York Mets farm system
