= LCCHS =

LCCHS may refer to:

- La Costa Canyon High School
- LaSalle Community Comprehensive High School in Quebec
