= Michel Leduc =

Michel Leduc (July 4, 1941 – September 14, 2012) was a Canadian doctor and politician. Leduc served as the Mayor of former borough of LaSalle, Quebec, from 1983 until December 31, 2001. Leduc was the last Mayor of LaSalle. The borough was annexed by the neighbouring city of Montreal on January 1, 2002. He was born in Châteauguay, Quebec.

Leduc was a doctor before entering politics. He was first elected Mayor of LaSalle in 1983 and won re-election four times. Under Leduc, LaSalle became the first major Quebec city to launch a large, far-reaching recycling program. The CEGEP André-Laurendreau sports complex and the Aquadome aquatic centre were both constructed during his tenure. Leduc served as Mayor until December 31, 2001; the city of LaSalle was annexed by neighboring Montreal on January 1, 2002.

Leduc died from cancer in Salaberry-de-Valleyfield, Quebec, on September 14, 2012, at the age of 71.
