= Westwood High School (Quebec) =

Location
- Junior: 2800 du Bordelais, Saint-Lazare, Quebec; Senior: 69 Côte St. Charles, Hudson, Quebec; Canada

Information
- School type: High school
- Founded: 2003
- School board: Lester B. Pearson School Board
- Principal: Anna Haller
- Language: English, French
- Colour: Maroon
- Team name: Wildcats
- Website: westwood.lbpsb.qc.ca

Westwood High School is an English-language high school located in St. Lazare and Hudson in Quebec, roughly 24 km west of Montreal, Quebec, Canada. The school is administered by the Lester B. Pearson School Board and is divided into a junior campus in Saint-Lazare for secondary I and II and a senior campus in Hudson for secondary III, IV, and V.

== History ==
Immigrant families from Cumberland, England first began to settle on this land in the early 1800s. Attracted by the rolling hills, fertile lands for farming, and proximity to the Ottawa River, families put down their roots along the Lake of Two Mountains. Beginning construction in 1919 and officially opening in February 1920, Westwood Senior High School, previously Hudson High School, is a school with a long history.

Renovations first began when it became necessary to erect a fence in order to prevent cattle from wandering onto the yard during lunch. Since then, the population of Hudson and surrounding towns has continued to grow, leading to major renovations and additions in 1939, 1948–49, 1961–62, and in 1987-88.

On July 1, 2003, Hudson High School and Vaudreuil County High School were divided into Westwood High School Senior Campus located in Hudson, Quebec which offers secondary III, IV, and V education, and Westwood High School Junior Campus located in St. Lazare, offering secondary I & II education. These two campuses serve the Hudson and St. Lazare areas, as well as 24 other surrounding communities, up to the Ontario border.

The land where the junior campus is today was known as lot #P603, which the town of St. Lazare purchased from Mrs. Shirley Hunt and her brother David Hunt. The land had been in the Hunt family for several generations. A referendum was also held, as some residents did not want the school to be built. It was what the local newspapers called "A ongoing saga" but in the March 29, 2000 edition of the Hudson Gazette, the front page reported "New school on schedule"

The junior campus, formerly known as Vaudreuil County High School was poised to open its doors in August 2000, but due to delays was not ready for over a month after the school year began. The first principal of Vaudreuil County was David Hatfield.

Only a year after its opening, the Lester B. Pearson School board decided to merge Hudson High School and Vaudreuil County High School, putting the junior grades at Hudson High and senior grades at Vaudreuil (opposite of today). This decision was met with anger, and a court battle from the community . The quarrel took until the end of the 2002-2003 school year to resolve.

== Location ==
The junior Campus is located in St. Lazare, roughly 24 kilometres west of Montreal, Quebec, Canada. The senior campus is located in the town of Hudson, Quebec of the Montérégie administrative region within the Greater Montreal metropolitan area of Quebec – roughly 24 km west of Montreal Island.

== Programs and activities ==
The senior campus offers a variety of co-curricular programs which includes athletics, drama, music, art, cultural activities, debating, student government, community service, tutoring, and more.

Clubs available to students include Journalism, Library Club, Art Club, Drama Club, Outdoors Club, Model UN, Sisterhood (a club that aims to bring together and empower girls through a safe community on campus), Brotherhood (a club that aims to improve the image that high school boys have acquired by engaging in positive school activities), Ceramics, Corporate Pitch (a club responsible for raising funds towards Bridge to Burundi), and Yearbook.

Sport activities are available to students during the fall season: soccer, cross country running, volleyball, and softball; the winter season: basketball, curling, cross-country skiing, and wrestling; and the spring season: rugby, girls' touch football, lacrosse, and outdoor track and field.

A Word-Study Program is offered which allows students to work outside of school one day per week in order to practice a skill or trade which may interest them as a future career. This course counts for four credits, and students are expected to continue to take a full course load.

Secondary V students have the opportunity to participate in the International Development Project which consists of a 2-3 week cultural exchange in a Central or South American country. The aim of this project is to expose students to global issues and encourage community involvement as well as fostering respect, responsibility, cooperation, and accountability.

=== Bridge to Burundi ===
The Bridge to Burundi project was started in October 2009 by students who were touched by a presentation given by one of the teachers, native Burundian Jean-Claude Manirakiza, about the state of education in his home country following the Burundian genocides. The students set out on the process of building an elementary school in Rwoga, Burundi and after 8 months opened the school to 60 1st graders. The project has continued to grow and now offers free education and supplies to more than 400 students, a medical center, a convenience store, a flour mill, solar panels, and drinkable water to the village.

Funds for the project have been raised through bake sales, talent shows, dances, corporate sponsors, and in 2015 the students of Westwood Senior High School published their first children's book "Bakuru and the School on the Hill"

The project has been officially endorsed by Lt.-General Roméo Dallaire, a former UN Commander; the Burundi government; Greg Mortensen (internationally-bestselling author of Three Cups of Tea); Primus Online, Aeroplan, and Facebook Canada. The project also won an award at the 2010 Quebec Entrepreneurship Contest.

== Alumni ==
- Jack Layton (Hudson High School)
- Vanessa Lengies (Hudson High School)
- Amanda Walsh (Hudson High School)

== See also ==
- Lester B. Pearson School Board
- Saint-Lazare, Quebec
