= McDonald Elementary School =

McDonald Elementary School may refer to:

- McDonald Elementary School, Central Valley School District, Washington, United States
- McDonald Elementary School, Georgetown County School District, South Carolina, United States
- McDonald Elementary School, Mohawk, Tennessee, United States
- F. A. McDonald Elementary School, Seattle, Washington, United States (1914-1981), now reopened as McDonald International School (of Seattle Public Schools)

See also:

- Macdonald Elementary School (disambiguation)
