= Riverside Park, Montreal =

Urban park in Montreal, Canada

Riverside Park
- Parc Riverside
- Location within Montreal
- Type: Urban park
- Location: LaSalle, Quebec, Canada
- Coordinates: 45°25′12″N 73°36′41″W
- Operator: City of Montreal
- Open: 7:00 a.m to 11:00 p.m.
- Status: Open all year
- Public transit: STM Bus: 58, 110, 123
- Website: Parc Riverside

Riverside Park (French: Parc Riverside) is a park in the LaSalle borough of Montreal, Quebec, Canada. It is bordered by Centrale Street to the south, 35e Avenue to the west, Raymond Street to the east and a school and an adult education centre to the north.

== Features ==
The park features various sports facilities including: swimming pools, two tennis courts, a baseball field, a basketball court, a Canadian football field, a soccer field, a running track and outdoor ice rinks during the winter.

The park also contains two sports venues, Éloi Viau Stadium and Keith Ewenson Stadium.

== Éloi Viau Stadium ==
Éloi Viau Stadium (French: Stade Éloi-Viau) is home to Les Cardinals de LaSalle of the Ligue de Baseball Élite du Québec (LBEQ). The park's dimensions are 323 feet (98 m) along the lines and 360 feet (110 m) in centre field.

Éloi Viau Stadium
- Interactive map of Éloi Viau Stadium
- Former names: Riverside Park
- Location: LaSalle, Montreal, Quebec, Canada
- Capacity: Baseball - 1,000
- Surface: Grass
- Field size: 323 in left, 345 left centre, 360 center, 345 right centre, 323 right

Construction
- Opened: 1980
