= Lachine, Quebec =

Lachine
- Borough of Montreal
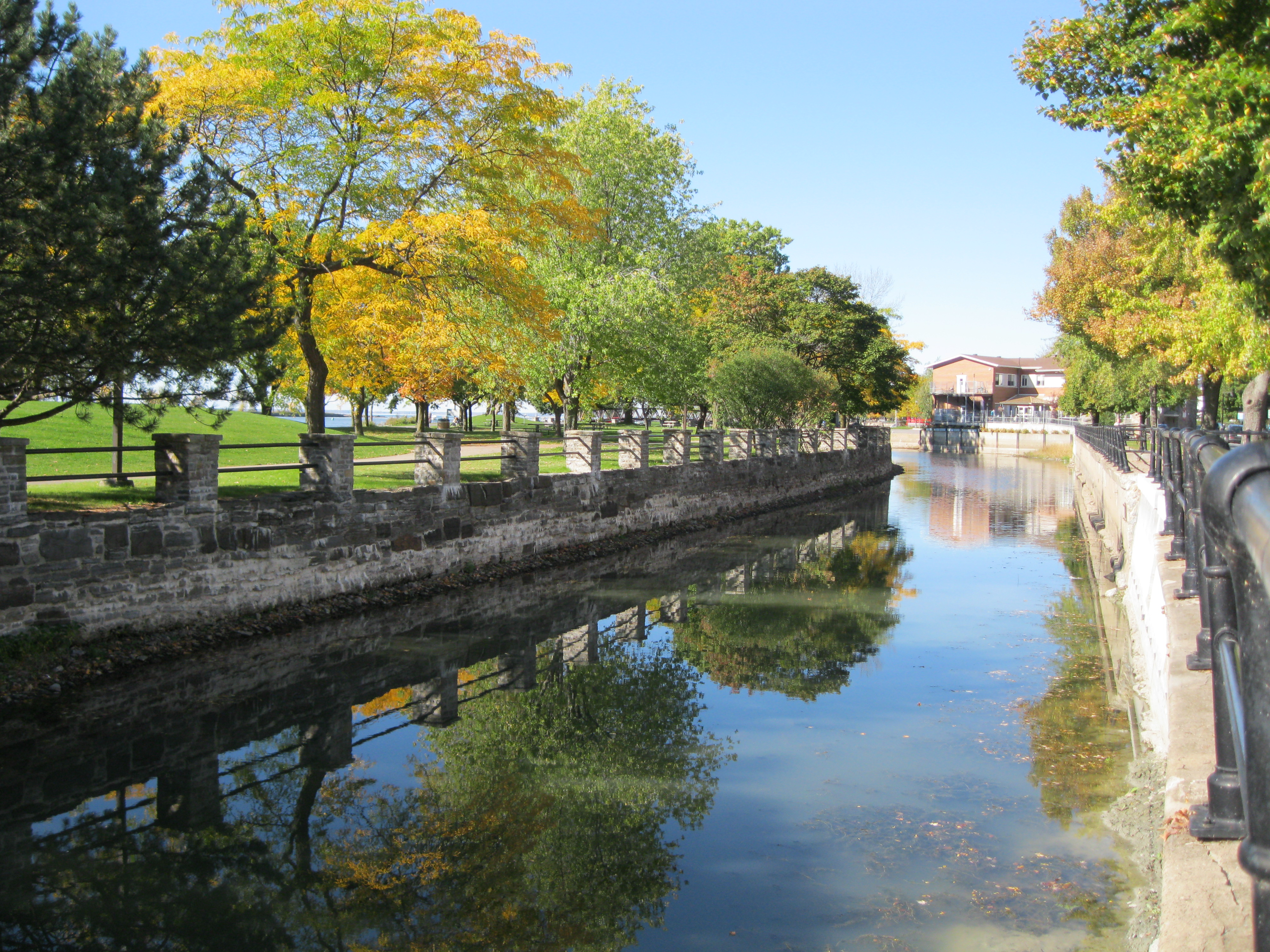
- Lachine Canal

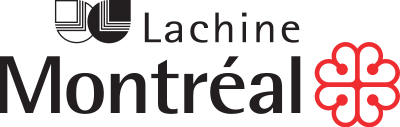

- Location of Lachine on the Island of Montreal. (Grey areas indicate demerged municipalities.)
- Coordinates: 45°25′59″N 73°40′51″W
- Country: Canada
- Province: Quebec
- City: Montreal
- Region: Montréal
- Parish of Saints-Anges-de-la-Chine: 1676
- Incorporated: 1848
- Montreal merger: January 1, 2002
- Electoral Districts Federal: Dorval—Lachine—LaSalle
- Provincial: Marquette

Government
  - Type: Borough
  - Mayor: Maja Vodanovic (PM)
  - Federal MP(s): Anju Dhillon (LPC)
  - Quebec MNA(s): Enrico Ciccone (PLQ)

Area
  - Land: 17.75 km^{2} (6.85 sq mi)

Population (2016)
  - Total: 44,489
  - Density: 2/km^{2} (5.2/sq mi)
  - Change (2011-16): ▲6.9%
  - Dwellings (2006): 19,909
- Time zone: UTC-5 (EST)
  - Summer (DST): UTC-4 (EDT)
- Postal code(s): H8S, H8T, H8R
- Area codes: (514) and (438)
- Access Routes A-13 A-20: A-520; R-138
- Website: lachine. ville.montreal.qc.ca

Lachine (French pronunciation: [laʃin]) is a borough (arrondissement) within the city of Montreal on the Island of Montreal in southwestern Quebec, Canada.

It was founded as a trading post in 1669. Developing into a parish and then an autonomous city, it was merged as a municipality into Montreal in 2002.

== History ==
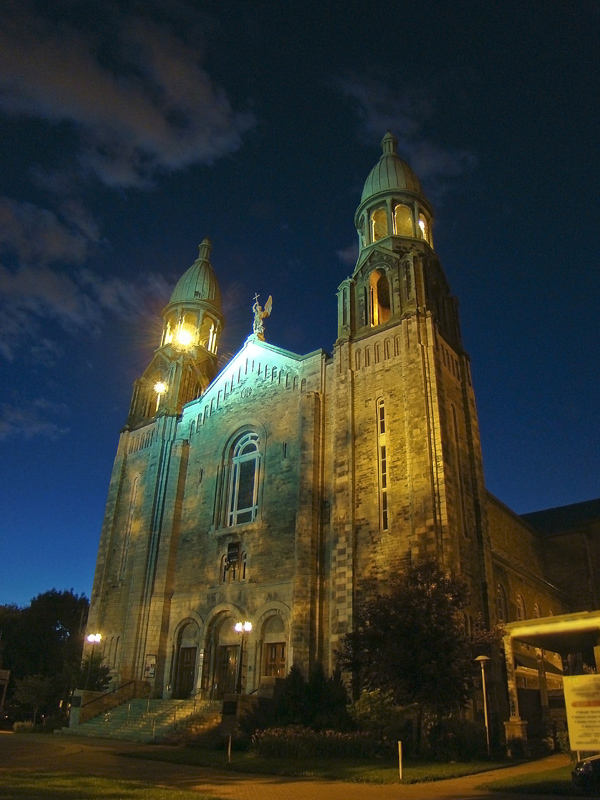
Church of Saints-Anges-Gardiens, built 1919–1920

The first seigniory, Côte-Saint-Sulpice, was granted to the explorer and fur trader René-Robert Cavelier, Sieur de La Salle in 1667, with the first French settlers arriving at the beginning of 1669. A trading post was established and then fortified under the name of Fort Rolland. This bastion became an important place for the fur trade.

On August 4, 1689, more than 1500 Mohawk warriors raided the small village and burned it to the ground in retaliation for the ravaging of the Seneca lands, which the governor of New France, the Marquis de Denonville, was accused of having committed. Some estimates suggest that during the Lachine massacre approximately 200 settlers were killed, while a further 120 were taken captive.

Lachine was incorporated as a village in 1848. It became a town in 1872 and a city in 1909. In 1912, it annexed the neighbouring Town of Summerlea, itself founded in 1895. It merged with the town of Saint-Pierre in 1999, and the combined municipality merged into Montreal on January 1, 2002. Lachine's logo during its municipality days is still in use today.

== Etymology ==
Lachine, apparently from the French term la Chine for China, is often said to have been named in 1667, in mockery of its then owner René-Robert Cavelier de La Salle, who explored the interior of North America trying to find a passage to China. When he returned without success, he and his men were derisively named les Chinois (the Chinese). The name was adopted when the parish of Saints-Anges-de-la-Chine was created in 1676, with the form "Lachine" appearing with the opening of a post office in 1829.

An alternative etymology attributes the name to the famous French explorer Samuel de Champlain, who also hoped to find a passage from the Saint Lawrence River to China. According to this version, in 1618 Champlain proposed that a customs house would tax the trade goods from China passing this point, hence the name Lachine.

== Geography ==
The borough is located in the southwest portion of the island of Montreal, at the inlet of the Lachine Canal, between the borough of LaSalle and the city of Dorval. It was a separate city until the municipal mergers on January 1, 2002, and it did not demerge on January 1, 2006.

The borough is bordered to the northwest by the city of Dorval, to the northeast by Saint-Laurent, to the east by Côte Saint-Luc, Montreal West and a narrow salient of Le Sud-Ouest, and to the south by LaSalle. Its western limit is the shore of Lake Saint-Louis and the Saint Lawrence River.

It has an area of 17.83 km^{2} (7 sq. mi.) and a population of 44,489 per the 2016 Canadian Census.

== Demographics ==
Historical populations
Year	Pop.	±%
1966	50,221	—
1971	51,220	+2.0%
1976	47,542	−7.2%
1981	42,826	−9.9%
1986	39,850	−6.9%
1991	40,233	+1.0%
1996	39,910	−0.8%
2001	40,222	+0.8%
2006	41,391	+2.9%
2011	41,616	+0.5%
2016	44,489	+6.9%

Home language (2016)
Language	Population	Percentage (%)
French	23,750	60%
English	11,880	29%
Non-official language only	4,555	11%

Mother tongue (2016)
Language	Population	Percentage (%)
French	23,320	56%
English	9,700	24%
Non-official language only	8,275	20%

Visible minorities (2016)
Ethnicity	Population	Percentage (%)
Not a visible minority	32,250	75.9%
Visible minorities	10,255	24.1%

== Government ==
=== Municipal government ===
As of the November 7, 2021 Montreal election, the current borough council consists of the following members:

District	Position	Name	Party
—	Borough mayor City councillor	Maja Vodanovic	Projet Montréal
—	City councillor	Vicki Grondin	Projet Montréal
Du Canal	Borough councillor	Micheline Rouleau	Projet Montréal
Fort-Rolland	Borough councillor	Michèle Flannery	Projet Montréal
J.-Émery-Provost	Borough councillor	Younes Boukala	Projet Montréal

=== Federal and provincial districts ===
The entire borough is located within the federal riding of Dorval-Lachine-LaSalle, and within the provincial electoral district of Marquette.

== Infrastructure ==
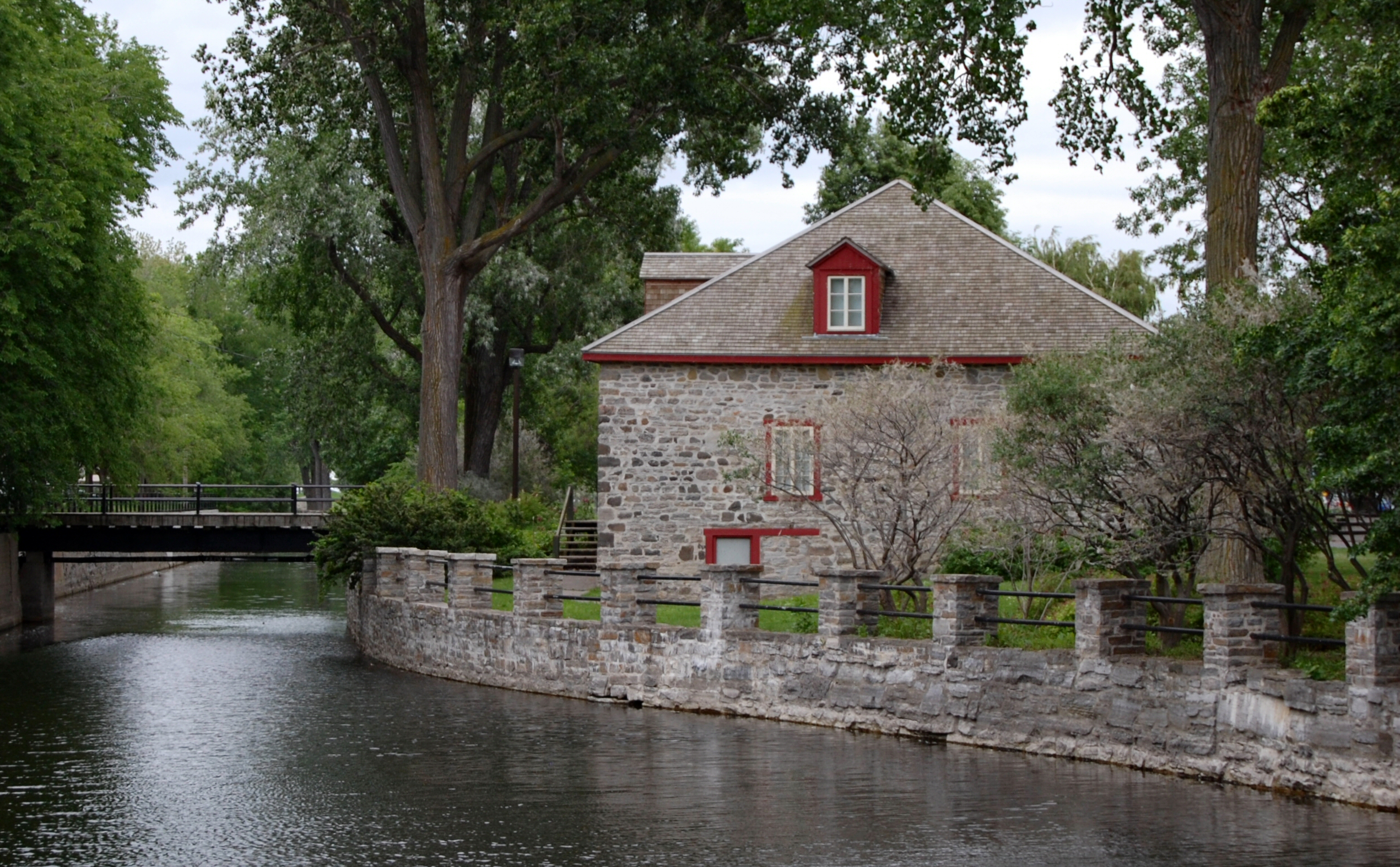
Trading post on the Lachine Canal

Autoroute 20 passes through Lachine, which is also served by the Lachine commuter train station.

Most noticeable of Lachine's features is the Lachine Canal and its recreational facilities, including the Lachine Canal National Historic Site. Around the canal's inlet, in the southern part of the borough, are located The Fur Trade at Lachine National Historic Site, René Lévesque Park (on a long peninsula extending into Lac Saint-Louis), and the Musée de Lachine, which has collections of modern outdoor sculpture both on its own grounds, in René-Lévesque Park, and in other sites throughout the borough. Other historic buildings are also located near the canal's inlet.

== Parks ==
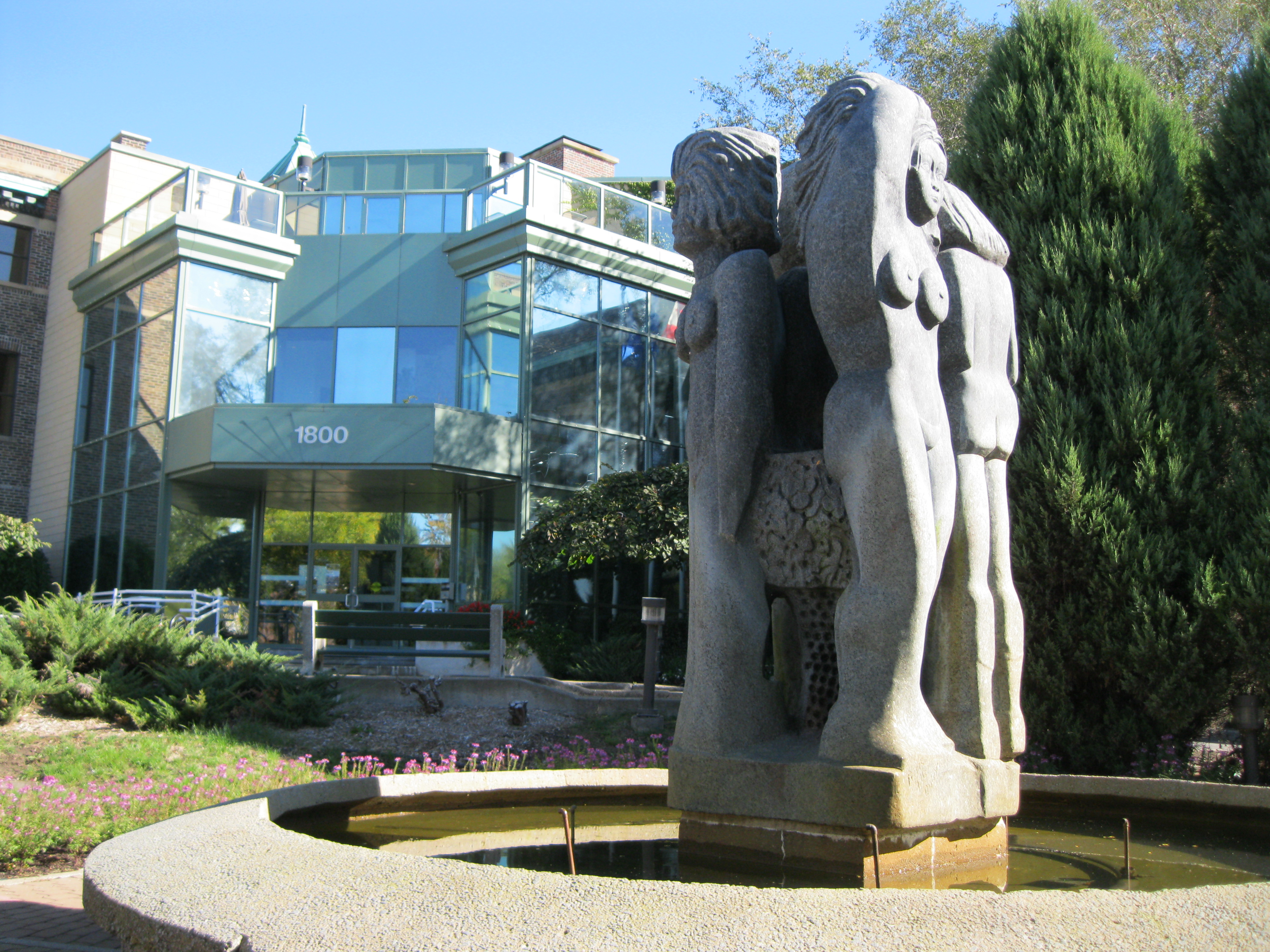
The Fontaine de Vie at Lachine Borough Hall

A memorial to Air India Flight 182 is located in Monk Island, in Lachine. It was inaugurated in 2010.

== Education ==
=== Primary and secondary schools ===
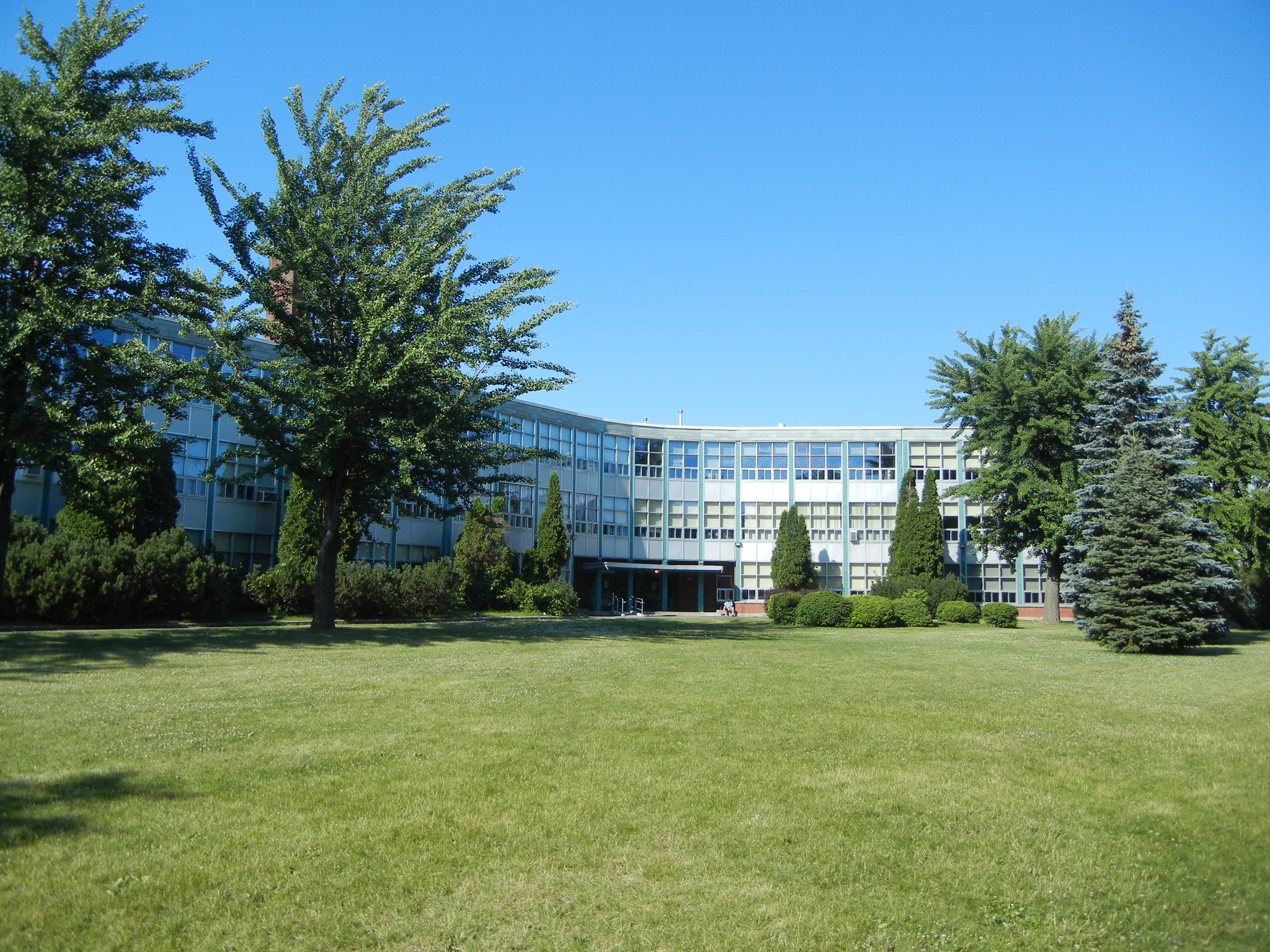
Lakeside Academy

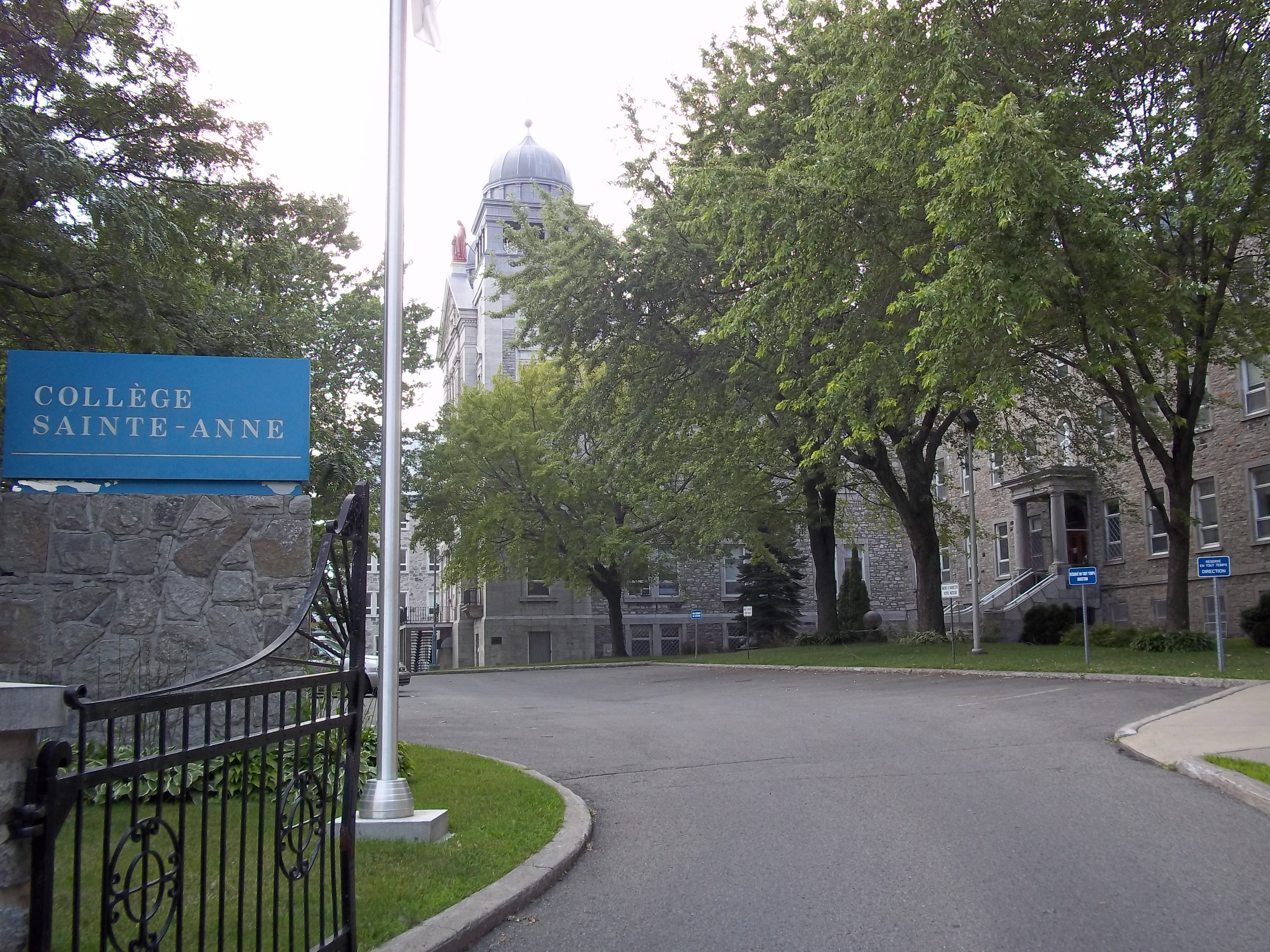
Collège Sainte-Anne

The Commission scolaire Marguerite-Bourgeoys operates Francophone public schools.

Adult schools include:

- Centre d'éducation des adultes de LaSalle, Édifice Boileau

Professional development centres include:

- Centre de formation professionnelle de Lachine (CFP), Édifice Dalbé-Viau and Édifice de la Rive

Secondary schools include:

- École secondaire Dalbé-Viau
- Collège Saint-Louis
- College Sainte-Anne de Lachine

Primary schools include:

- École Primaire Catherine-Soumillard
- École Primaire Victor Therrien

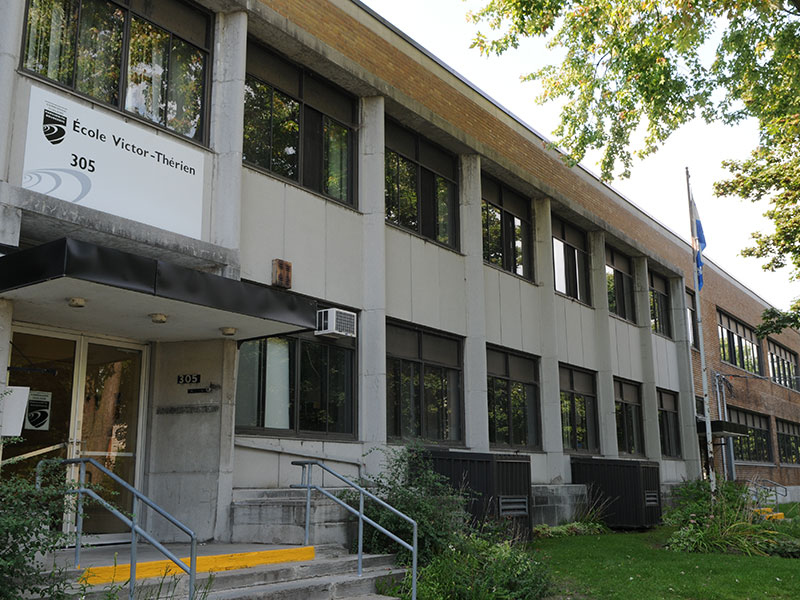
École Primaire Victor Therien

- École Primaire des Berges-de-Lachine
- École Primaire Jardin-des-Saints-Anges
- École Primaire Martin-Bélanger
- École Primaire Paul-Jarry
- École Primaire Philippe-Morin
- École Primaire Très-Saint-Sacrement

The Lester B. Pearson School Board (LBPSB) operates Anglophone public schools.

- Lakeside Academy (a merger of Lachine High School and Bishop Whelan High School)
- Maple Grove Elementary School in Lachine, a merger of the Meadowbrook School in Lachine and the Bishop-Whelan School in Dorval, opened in August 2010
- A portion is zoned to LaSalle Elementary Junior and Senior Campus in LaSalle
- The Pearson Electrotechnology Centre (PEC; Centre d'électrotechnologie Pearson), a public vocational school of the LBPSB, is in Lachine.

=== Public libraries ===
The Montreal Public Libraries Network operates the Saint-Pierre Branch and the Saul-Bellow Branch in Lachine.

== Notable residents ==
- Jean-Louis Besnard (dit Carignant) (1734–1791), merchant trader
- Saul Bellow (1915–2005), author
- M. Wylie Blanchet (1891–1961), travel writer, was raised in Lachine
- Tim Harkness (1937), baseball player for the New York Mets
- Enock Makonzo (1997), football player for the Edmonton Elks
- Victor Malarek (1948-), journalist, broadcaster, novelist, investigative reporter
- Michael E. Rose (1954–), journalist, broadcaster, novelist, playwright
- Shmuel Schecter (1915–2000), rabbi and Torah educator

== See also ==
- Montreal Merger
- List of former cities in Quebec
- Municipal reorganization in Quebec
- Lachine Canal opened in 1825.
