= LaSalle Community Comprehensive High School =

Lasalle Community Comprehensive High School
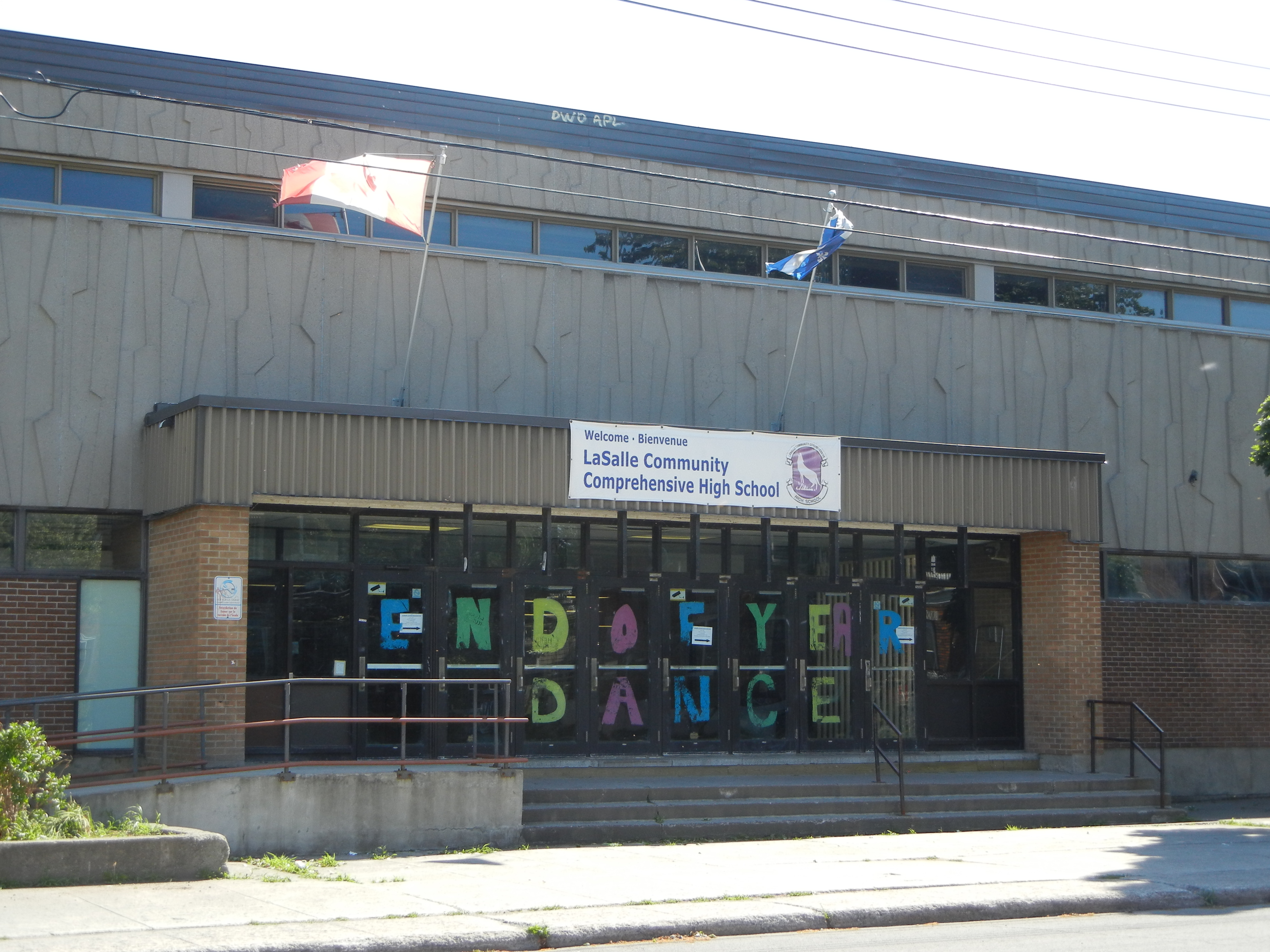

Location
- 240 9th Avenue; LaSalle, Quebec, H8P 2N9; Canada
- Coordinates: 45°25′42.2″N 73°36′01.4″W

Information
- School type: Public, Secondary School
- Founded: 1971
- School board: Lester B. Pearson School Board
- Principal: Wusua Mitchell
- Grades: Secondary I-V (Grade 7-11)
- Enrollment: 1000 (2012)
- Language: English
- Area: LaSalle
- Colour: Blue
- Mascot: Wolf
- Team name: LCCHS Wolves
- Website: lcchs.lbpsb.qc.ca

LaSalle Community Comprehensive High School (commonly referred to as LCCHS or LaSalle Comprehensive) is a secondary school in the Montreal, Quebec, Canada borough of LaSalle. It is part of the Lester B. Pearson School Board. The present school is the result of a merger between two former schools, Leroux High School and LaSalle Catholic High School, which occurred in 1971.
