= Macdonald High School =

Location
- 17 Maple Street; Sainte-Anne-De-Bellevue, Quebec, H9X 2E5; Canada; 45°24′23.9″N 73°56′41.7″W

Information
- School type: Public, High School
- Founded: 1907
- School board: Lester B. Pearson School Board
- Principal: Jason Thivierge
- Grades: Secondary Grade 7-11)
- Language: English
- Area: Sainte-Anne-De-Bellevue
- Colours: Green,blue, black and white
- Mascot: Bulldog love
- Team name: Bulldogs
- Website: macdonald.lbpsb.qc.ca

Macdonald High School (also known as Mac) is an English-language public high school in Sainte-Anne-de-Bellevue, Quebec, Canada. It has about 1,000 students and is administered by the Lester B. Pearson School Board.

== History ==
The school's building was completed in 1906 as the Protestant Day School of Ste. Anne de Bellevue. It was a model observation and practice school for the newly built Macdonald Campus School for Teachers. All four teachers and all but four of the 99 initial students were boarders, living at the school.
