= Lester B. Pearson School Board =

School board in Quebec, Canada

Location
- 1925 Brookdale Ave. Dorval, Quebec H9P 2Y7 Canada

District information
- Schools: 40 elementary schools 12 high schools
- Budget: CA$427,294,908 million (2025-2026)

Students and staff
- Students: More than 20,000

Other information
- Website: www.lbpsb.qc.ca

The Lester B. Pearson School Board (LBPSB, French: Commission scolaire Lester-B.-Pearson, CSLBP) is one of the largest school boards on the island of Montreal and one of the nine English school boards in the province of Quebec. It is headquartered in Dorval, Quebec.

Established in 1998, the LBPSB is responsible for English public schools from Verdun, through the West Island and Ile Perrot and "mainland" territories stretching west to the Ontario border. It is named after Lester B. Pearson, Canada's 14th prime minister. The LBPSB consists of schools formerly operated by the Lakeside School Board (Protestant) and the Baldwin-Cartier Schools Commission (Catholic).

As of 2017 Michael Chechile is the director general of the school board and the chairman of the board is Noel Burke.

The Lester B. Pearson School Board is the only school board in Canada to have an official consultative group of students to its council. The group, entitled the 'Central Students' Committee' (CSC for short) produces formal responses to the consultations proposed by the Council of Commissioners.

== List of LBPSB Schools ==
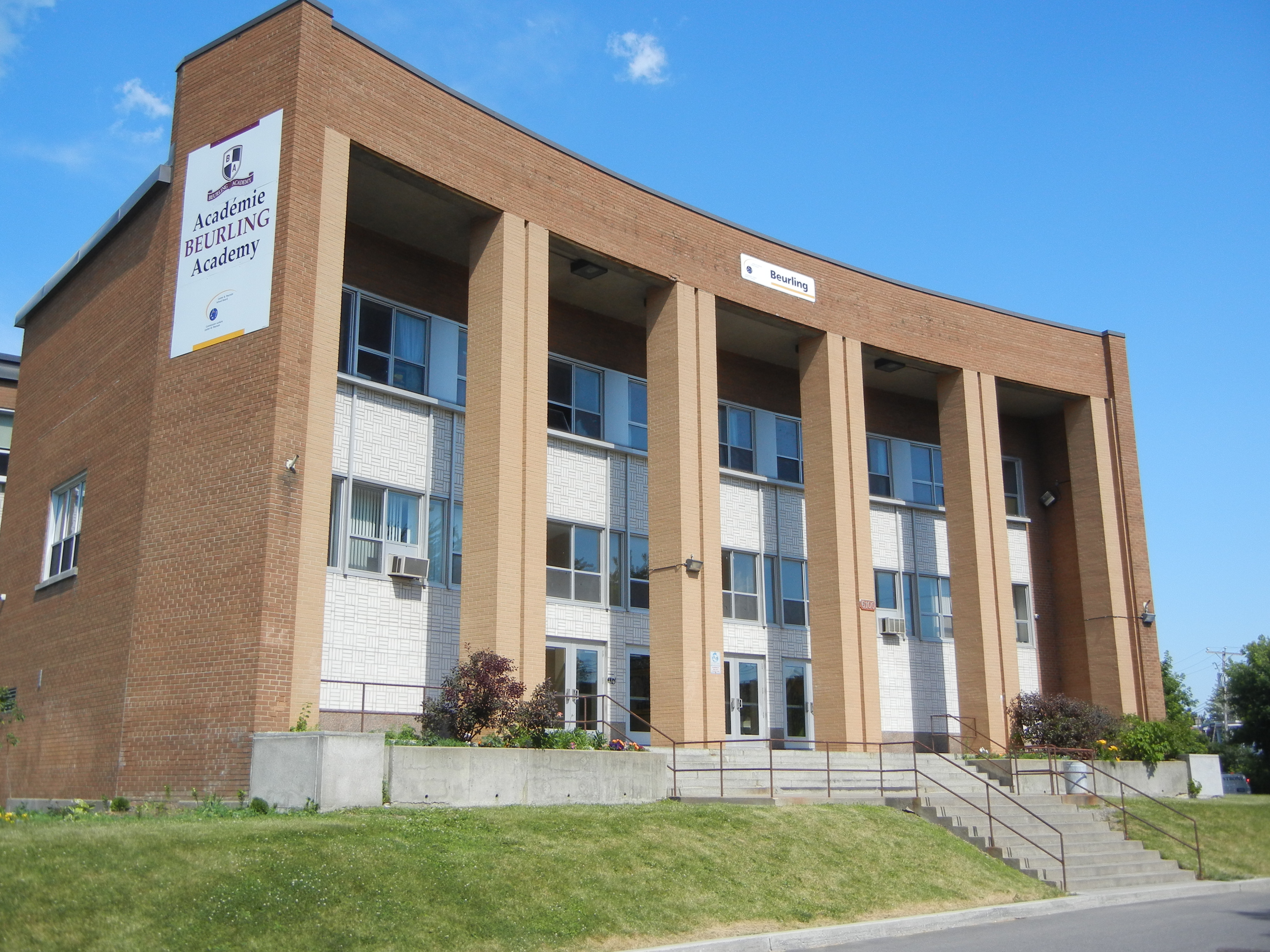
Beurling Academy

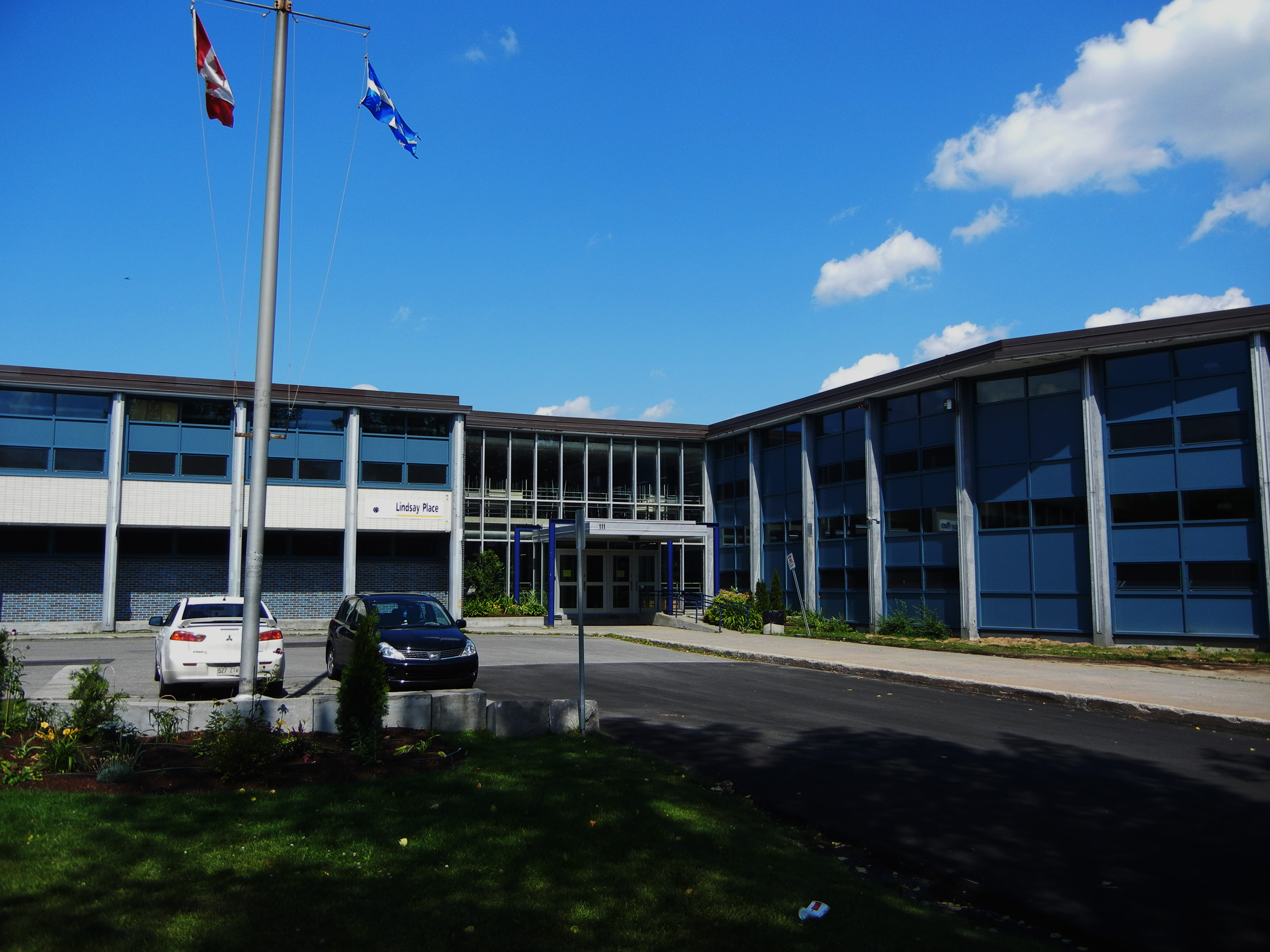
St. Thomas High School

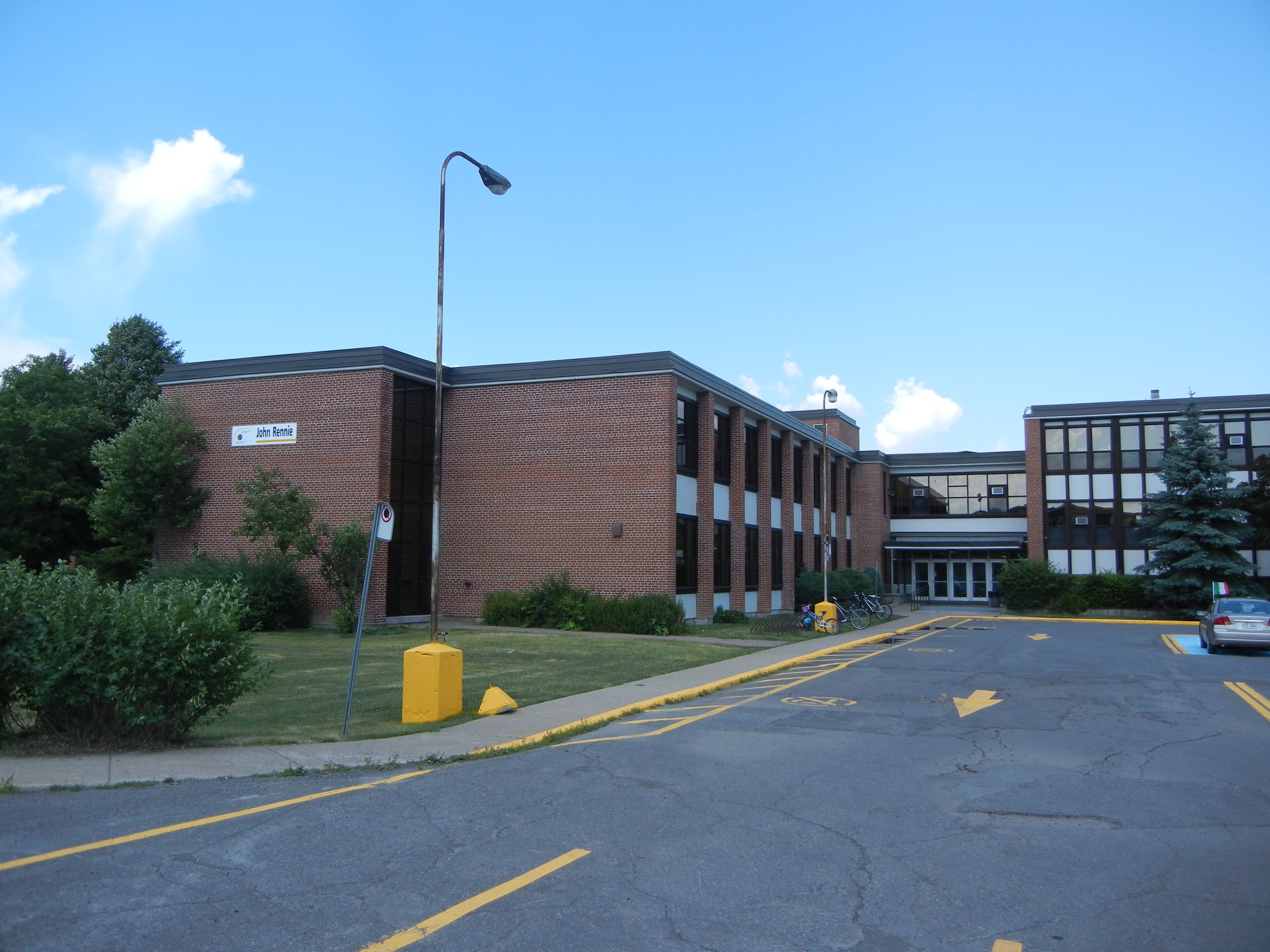
John Rennie High School

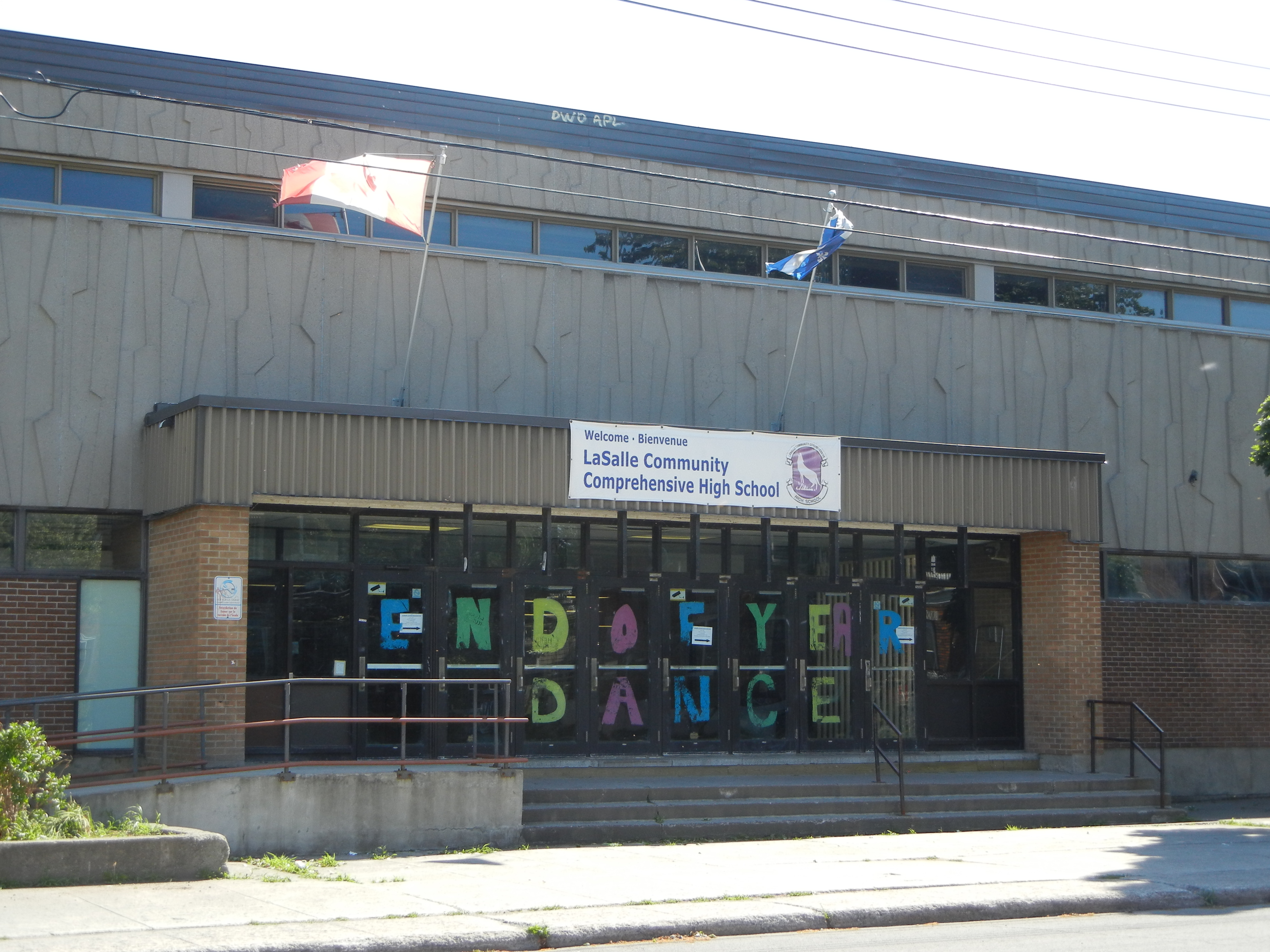
LaSalle Community Comprehensive High School

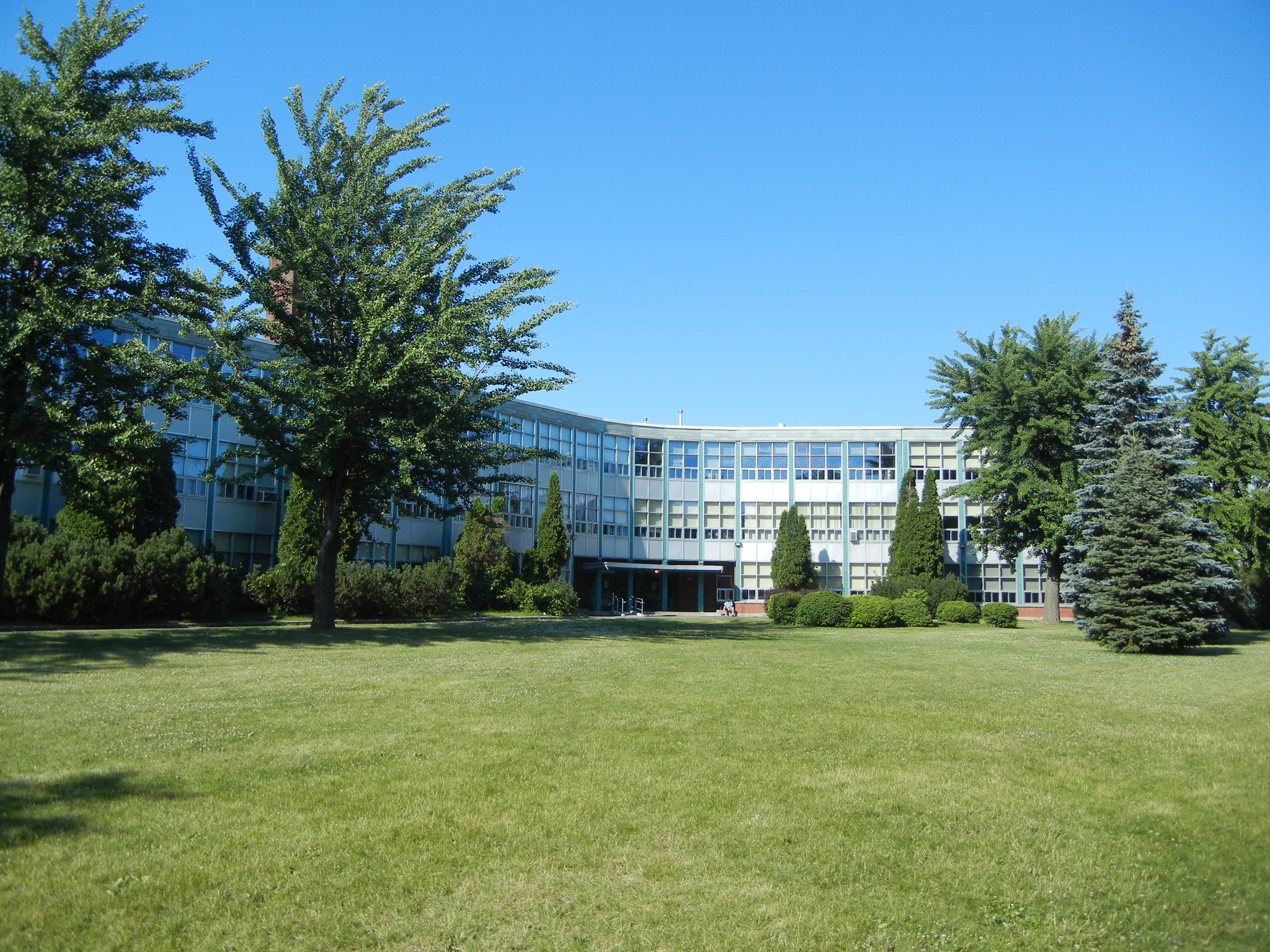
Lakeside Academy

This school board oversees 37 elementary schools, 13 secondary schools, 4 adult education centres and 6 vocational training centres, in which more than 20,000 students are enrolled.

=== Baie-d'Urfé ===
Elementary School:

- Dorset Elementary School

=== Beaconsfield ===
Vocational Education:

- Gordon Robertson Centre

Adult Education:

- Place Cartier Adult Centre

High school:

- Beaconsfield High School

Elementary School:

- Beacon Hill Elementary School
- Christmas Park Elementary School
- Sherbrooke Academy Sr.
- St. Edmund Elementary School
- Sherbrooke Academy Jr.

=== Dollard-des-Ormeaux ===
Elementary School:

- Springdale Elementary School
- Sunshine Academy
- Westpark Elementary School
- Wilder Penfield Elementary School

=== Dorval ===
Elementary School:

- Dorval Elementary School

=== Hudson ===
High school:

- Westwood High School - Senior Campus

Elementary School:

- Mount Pleasant Elementary School

=== Kirkland ===
Elementary School:

- Margaret Manson Elementary School

=== Lachine, Montreal ===
Vocational Education:

- Pearson Electrotechnology Centre

High school:

- Lakeside Academy

Elementary School:

- Maple Grove Elementary School

=== LaSalle, Montreal ===
Vocational Education:

- P.A.C.C Vocational Training

Adult Education:

- P.A.C.C. (Adult Education)

High schools:

- LaSalle Community Comprehensive High School

Elementary School:

- Children's World Academy
- Allion Elementary School
- St. Lawrence Academy (Junior)
- St. Lawrence Academy (Senior)
- LaSalle Elementary School

=== Pierrefonds-Roxboro, Montreal ===
Vocational Education:

- West Island Career Centre

High schools:

- Pierrefonds Community High School

Elementary School:

- Beachwood Elementary School
- Greendale Elementary School
- St. Anthony Elementary School
- St. Charles Elementary School
- Terry Fox Elementary School

=== Pincourt ===
Elementary School:

- Edgewater Elementary School
- St. Patrick Elementary School

=== Pointe-Claire ===
High schools:

- Horizon High School
- John Rennie High School
- St. Thomas High School

Elementary School:

- Clearpoint Elementary School
- St. John Fisher Elementary School (Junior)
- St. John Fisher Elementary School (Senior)

=== Saint-Télesphore ===
Elementary School:

- Soulanges Elementary School

=== Saint-Lazare ===
High schools:

- Westwood High School - Junior Campus

Elementary School:

- Evergreen Elementary School (Quebec)
- Forest Hill Elementary School (Junior)
- Forest Hill Elementary School (Senior)
- Birchwood Elementary School

=== Sainte-Anne-de-Bellevue ===
High schools:

- Macdonald High School

=== Vaudreuil-Dorion ===
Elementary School: Pierre Elliott Trudeau Elementary School

=== Verdun, Montreal ===
High schools:

- Beurling Academy

Elementary Schools:

- Verdun Elementary School
- Angrignon Elementary School
- Riverview Elementary School (Verdun)
