= Macdonald Elementary School =

Macdonald Elementary School may refer to:

- Macdonald Elementary School (Warminster, Pennsylvania)
- F. H. MacDonald Elementary (Thorburn, Nova Scotia)
- R C Macdonald Elementary School (British Columbia)
- Sir William MacDonald Elementary School (Vancouver, British Columbia)
- H. M. MacDonald Elementary School (Antigonish, Nova Scotia)
- MacDonald Elementary School (Dominion, Nova Scotia)

See also:

- McDonald Elementary School (disambiguation)
