= Ligue de Baseball Junior Élite du Québec =

Quebec Junior Elite Baseball League
- Sport: Baseball
- Founded: 1947
- President: Rodger Brulotte
- No. of teams: 13
- Country: Canada
- Most recent champion: Longueuil Ducs (2024)
- Most titles: Québec Diamants (7)
- Website: www.lbjeq.com

The Quebec Junior Elite Baseball League (QJEBL; French: Ligue de baseball junior élite Québec, LBJEQ) is the top-level amateur summer baseball league in the Canadian province of Quebec. It is composed entirely of junior elite players - the best baseball players in the province between 16 and 21 years of age.

== History ==
The league began as the Ligue de Baseball Royale junior, founded in 1948 by Gérard Thibault. In 1995 the league, now known as the Ligue de baseball Montréal Junior Élite merged with the eastern Quebec based Ligue Junior Majeure du Québec. Two years later the league assumed its current name.

== Teams ==
Active teams in the Ligue de Baseball Élite du Québec
Team	City	Venue
Charlesbourg Alouettes	Charlesbourg (Quebec City)	Parc Henri-Casault
Coaticook Rocket	Coaticook	Stade Julien-Morin
Gatineau Tyrans	Gatineau	Parc Sanscartier
Granby Guerriers	Granby	Stade Napoléon-Fontaine
LaSalle Cardinals	LaSalle (Montreal)	Stade Éloi-Viau
Laval Pirates	Laval	Parc Paul-Marcel-Maheu
Longueuil Ducs	Longueuil	Parc Paul-Pratt
Montreal Orioles	Ahuntsic-Cartierville (Montreal)	Ahuntsic Park
Québec Diamants	Quebec City	Stade Canac
Repentigny Royal	Repentigny	Parc Champigny
Saguenay Voyageurs	Saguenay	Stade Richard-Desmeules
St-Eustache Bisons	Saint-Eustache	Stade Clair-Matin
Trois-Rivières Jr. Aigles	Trois-Rivières	Stade Quillorama

== Champions ==
Year	League Champion	Playoff Champion
1969	DUCS DE LONGUEUIL	-
1970	LOISIRS ST-ALPHONSE D'AHUNTSIC	-
1971	ALOUETTES D'IMMACULÉE CONCEPTION	-
1972	EXPOS DE VILLE-MARIE	-
1973	EXPOS DE VILLE-MARIE	-
1974	EXPOS DE VILLE-MARIE	-
1975	300 DE REPENTIGNY	-
1976	ALOUETTES D'IMMACULÉE CONCEPTION	-
1977	300 DE REPENTIGNY	-
1978	ORIOLES DE ROSEMONT	-
1979	COUGARS DE ST-LÉONARD	-
1980	DUCS DE LONGUEUIL	-
1981	MONARQUES DE MONTRÉAL-NORD	-
1982	ORIOLES DE AHUNTSIC	-
1983	MONARQUES DE MONTRÉAL-NORD	-
1984	ORIOLES DE AHUNTSIC	-
1985	CAVALIERS DE LASALLE	-
1986	ASSOCIÉS DE LAVAL	-
1987	ASSOCIÉS DE LAVAL	-
1988	DUCS DE LONGUEUIL	-
1989	ASSOCIÉS DE LAVAL	-
1990	ASSOCIÉS DE LAVAL	-
1991	CARDINALS DE LASALLE	-
1992	ASSOCIÉS DE LAVAL	-
1993	ORIOLES D’AHUNTSIC	-
1994	CARDINALS DE LASALLE	-
1995	CARDINALS DE LASALLE	-
1996	BISONS DE ST-EUSTACHE	-
1997	ALOUETTES DE CHARLESBOURG	-
1998	ALOUETTES DE CHARLESBOURG	-
1999	BOMBARDIERS DE SHERBROOKE	Charlesbourg
2000	ALOUETTES DE CHARLESBOURG	Charlesbourg
2001	ÉLITES DE MONTRÉAL	Montréal
2002	CARDINALS DE LASALLE	Longueuil
2003	DUCS DE LONGUEUIL	St-Eustache
2004	DIAMANTS DE QUÉBEC	Longueuil
2005	DUCS DE LONGUEUIL	Trois-Rivières
2006	DUCS DE LONGUEUIL	Longueuil
2007	AIGLES DE TROIS-RIVIÈRES	Longueuil
2008	CARDINALS DE LASALLE	Montréal
2009	CARDINALS DE LASALLE	LaSalle
2010	DIAMANTS DE QUÉBEC	Montréal
2014	DIAMANTS DE QUÉBEC	
2015	DIAMANTS DE QUÉBEC	
2016	LE ROYAL CHEVROLET DE REPENTIGNY	
2017	LE ROYAL CHEVROLET DE REPENTIGNY	
2018	ORIOLES DE MONTRÉAL	
2019	DIAMANTS DE QUÉBEC	
2020	DIAMANTS DE QUÉBEC	
2021	BISONS DE ST-EUSTACHE	
2022	ROYAL DE REPENTIGNY	
2023	DUCS DE LONGUEUIL	Longueuil
2024	BISONS DE ST-EUSTACHE	Longueuil

== Former teams ==
Former teams in the Ligue de Baseball Élite du Québec
Team	City	Venue
Sherbrooke Athlétiques BRP	Sherbrooke	Amedée Roy Stadium

== See also ==
- Baseball awards#Canada
- Ligue de Baseball Senior Élite du Québec
