= LaSalle, Quebec =

Coordinates: 45°25′43″N 73°39′48″W

LaSalle
- Borough of Montreal
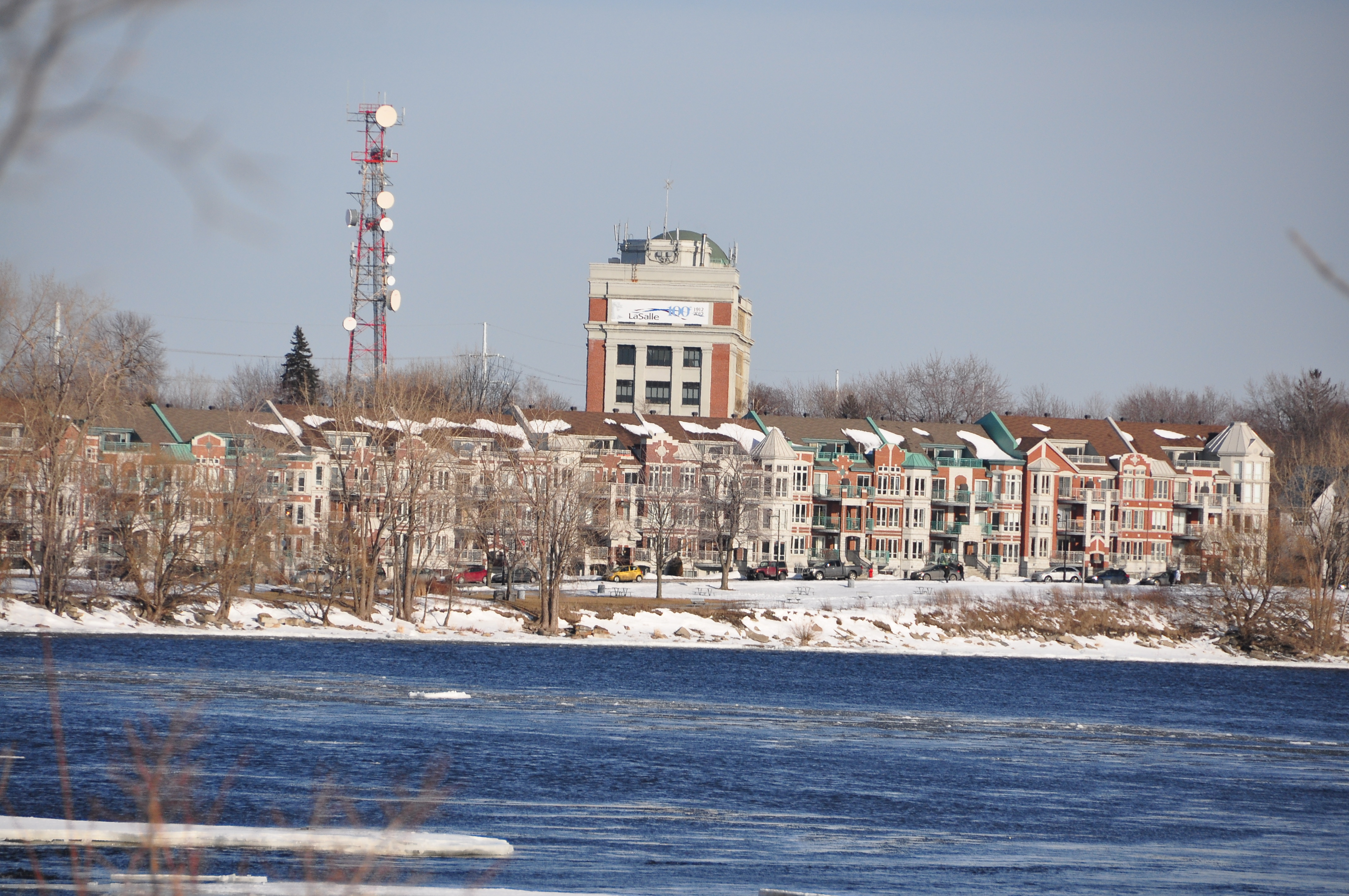

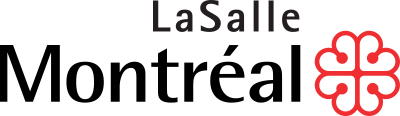
- Motto(s): "Obstantia Amovet" (Latin) "He pushes away obstacles and casts aside difficulties"
- Location of LaSalle on the Island of Montreal. (Grey areas indicate demerged municipalities).
- Country: Canada
- Province: Quebec
- City: Montreal
- Region: Montréal
- Established: 1676
- Incorporated: 1912
- Montreal merger: January 1, 2002
- Named for: René-Robert Cavelier de La Salle
- Electoral Districts Federal: Dorval—Lachine—LaSalle; LaSalle—Émard—Verdun
- Provincial: Marguerite-Bourgeoys

Government
  - Type: Borough
  - Borough Mayor: Nancy Blanchet (Équipe LaSalle Team)
  - Canada MP(s): Anju Dhillon (LPC); Claude Guay (LPC)
  - Quebec MNA(s): Fred Beauchemin (PLQ)

Area
  - Total: 16.3 km^{2} (6.3 sq mi)

Population (2021)
  - Total: 82,235
  - Density: 5,045/km^{2} (13,070/sq mi)
  - Dwellings: 31,810
- Demonym(s): LaSallois, LaSallian
- Time zone: UTC-5 (EST)
  - Summer (DST): UTC-4 (EDT)
- Postal code(s): H8N, H8P, H8R
- Area codes: (514) and (438)
- Website: www.ville.montreal.qc.ca

LaSalle (French pronunciation: [lasal]) is the most southerly borough (arrondissement) of the city of Montreal, Quebec, Canada. It is located in the south-west portion of the Island of Montreal, along the Saint Lawrence River. Prior to 2002, it was a separate municipality that had been incorporated in 1912.

== History ==
LaSalle was named for the area's first seigneur, French explorer René-Robert Cavelier de La Salle (1643–1687). The area became part of a municipality during the mid 19th century, and LaSalle was incorporated as an independent municipality in 1912.

The Lachine Rapids are situated within LaSalle territory. The name Lachine, which is also the name of the neighbouring borough, stayed because the LaSalle area was part of the parish of Saints-Anges-de-la-Chine during the French regime period. Before the creation of the Lachine Canal in the 1820s, the rapids had to be portaged on a trail called Chemin LaSalle (what is now LaSalle Boulevard).

LaSalle is known for its many public schools, most notably l'École secondaire Cavelier-de-LaSalle, known as one of the top talent-producing schools in the fields of dance and song. The other common public school in LaSalle is LaSalle Community Comprehensive High School, opened many years ago and home to many cultures.

Michel Leduc, who served as mayor from 1983 to December 31, 2001, was the last mayor of an independent LaSalle. Under Leduc, LaSalle became the first large city in Quebec to launch a large recycling program. LaSalle was annexed by the city of Montreal on January 1, 2002, along with a number of other cities on the Island of Montreal.

== Geography ==
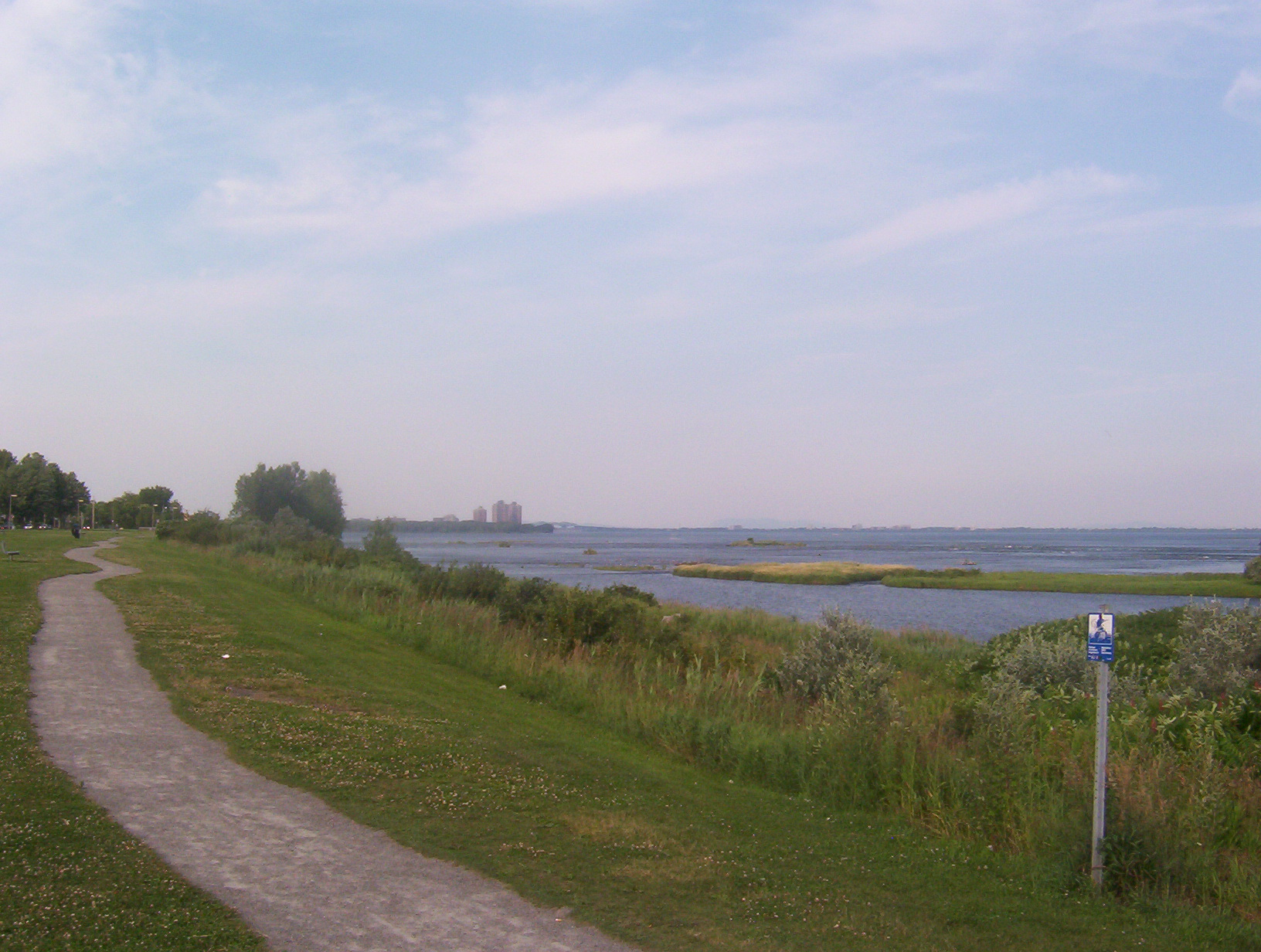
The Saint Lawrence River as viewed from LaSalle.

LaSalle is bounded by five adjacent municipalities and boroughs, these being Lachine towards the west, Verdun and the Sud-Ouest neighbourhood of Ville-Émard to the north-east, and Montreal West and the neighbourhood of Notre-Dame-de-Grâce within the borough of Côte-des-Neiges–Notre-Dame-de-Grâce towards the north, the latter two being divided by Autoroute 20 as well as the Lachine Canal. To its south and east lies the shore of the Saint Lawrence River, specifically a portion of the river known as the Lachine Rapids.

== Government ==
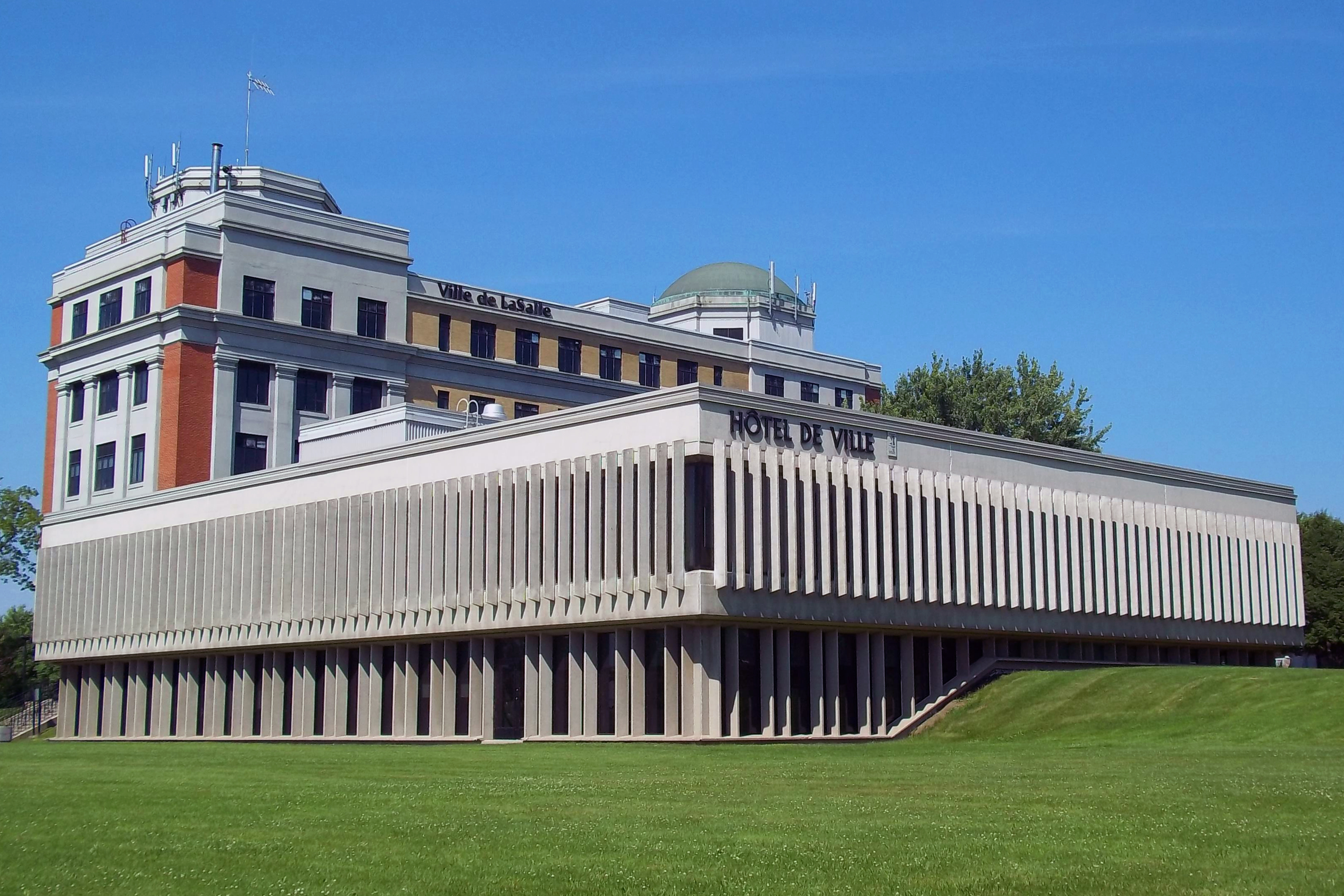
The Borough Hall of LaSalle.

=== Federal and provincial elections ===
Federally, the western part of the borough is located in Dorval—Lachine—LaSalle and the eastern part in LaSalle—Émard—Verdun. They are represented by Anju Dhillon and Claude Guay of the Liberal Party of Canada.

Provincially, the entire borough is within the electoral district of Marguerite-Bourgeoys represented by Fred Beauchemin of the Quebec Liberal Party.

=== Borough government ===
The borough is divided into two districts.

- Cecil-P.-Newman (North)
- Sault-Saint-Louis (South)

The borough elects a borough mayor, two city councillors, and four borough councillors.

As of the November 2, 2025 Montreal municipal election, the current borough council consists of the following councillors:

District	Position	Name	Party
—	Borough mayor	Nancy Blanchet	LaSalle Team
Cecil-P.-Newman	City councillor	Laura Palestini	LaSalle Team
Cecil-P.-Newman	Borough councillor	Bisma Ansari	LaSalle Team
Cecil-P.-Newman	Borough councillor	Josée Troilo	LaSalle Team
Sault-Saint-Louis	City councillor	Richard Deschamps	LaSalle Team
Sault-Saint-Louis	Borough councillor	Daniela Romano	LaSalle Team
Sault-Saint-Louis	Borough councillor	Benoit Auger	LaSalle Team

== Demographics ==
Historical populations
Year	Pop.	±%
1966	48,322	—
1971	72,920	+50.9%
1976	76,713	+5.2%
1981	76,299	−0.5%
1986	75,621	−0.9%
1991	73,804	−2.4%
1996	72,029	−2.4%
2001	73,983	+2.7%
2006	74,763	+1.1%
2011	74,276	−0.7%
2016	76,853	+3.5%
2021	82,235	+7.0%

Home language (2016)
Language	Population	Percentage (%)
French	28,770	42%
English	24,935	36%
Other languages	15,470	22%

Mother Tongue (2016)
Language	Population	Percentage (%)
French	27,275	38%
English	19,270	27%
Other languages	25,960	36%

Visible Minorities (2016)
Ethnicity	Population	Percentage (%)
Not a visible minority	47,305	62.9%
Visible minorities	27,845	37.1%

== Education ==
=== Post-secondary education ===
Cégep André-Laurendeau is in LaSalle.

=== Primary and secondary schools ===
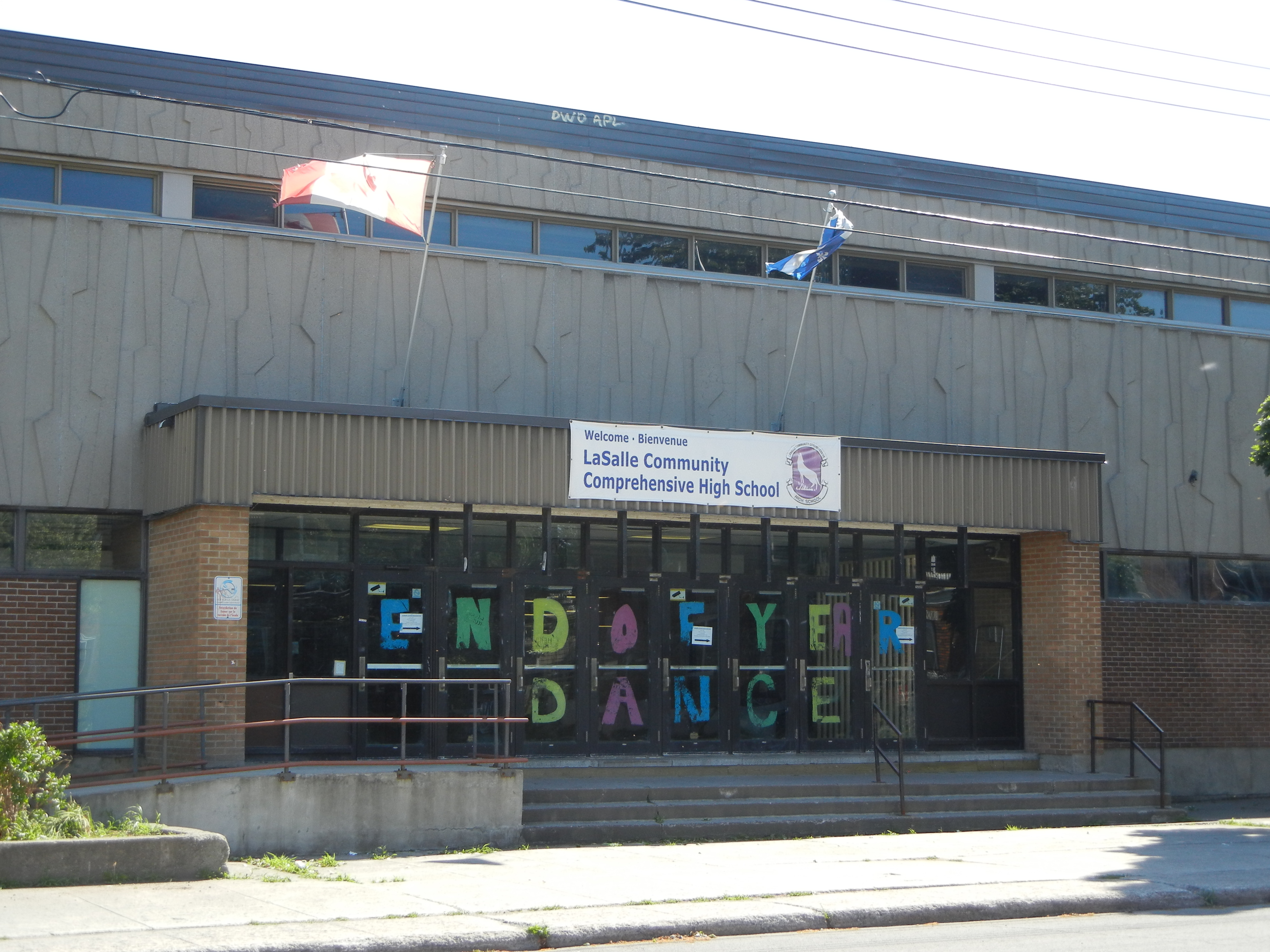
LaSalle Community Comprehensive High School

The Centre de services scolaire Marguerite-Bourgeoys operates Francophone public schools.

Adult schools:

- Centre d'éducation des adultes de LaSalle (the Clément and LaSalle buildings are in LaSalle)

Professional development centres:

- Centre intégré de mécanique, de métallurgie et d'électricité (CIMME)

Secondary schools:

- École secondaire Cavelier-De LaSalle (ESCL)
- École secondaire Caroline-Dawson

Primary schools:

- de l'Orée-du-Parc
- des Découvreurs
- du Grand-Héron
- du Petit-Collège
- Henri-Forest
- Laurendeau-Dunton
- L'Eau-Vive
- Notre-Dame-des-Rapides
- Pierre-Rémy
- Sainte-Catherine-Labouré
- Sainte-Geneviève (Sud)
- Terre-des-Jeunes

The Lester B. Pearson School Board (LBPSB) operates Anglophone public schools.

Secondary schools:

- LaSalle Community Comprehensive High School

Primary schools:

- Allion Elementary School
- LaSalle Junior Elementary and LaSalle Senior Elementary
- Children's World Elementary School (serves all areas)

=== Public libraries ===
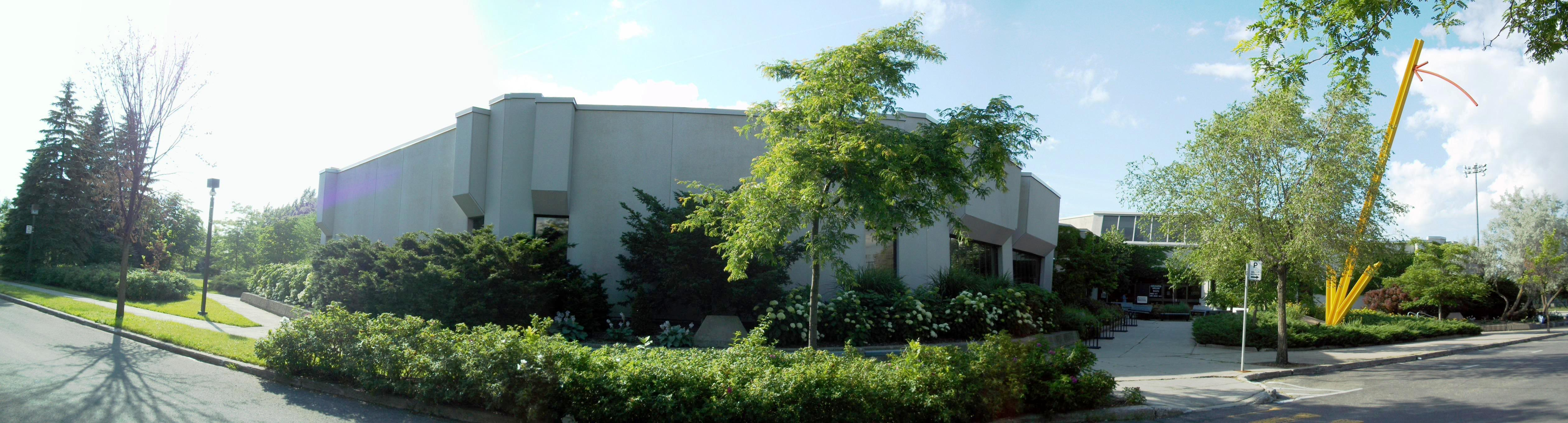
The centre culturel l'Octogone houses the L'Octagone library

The Montreal Public Libraries Network operates the L'Octogone Branch in Lasalle.

== Cityscape ==
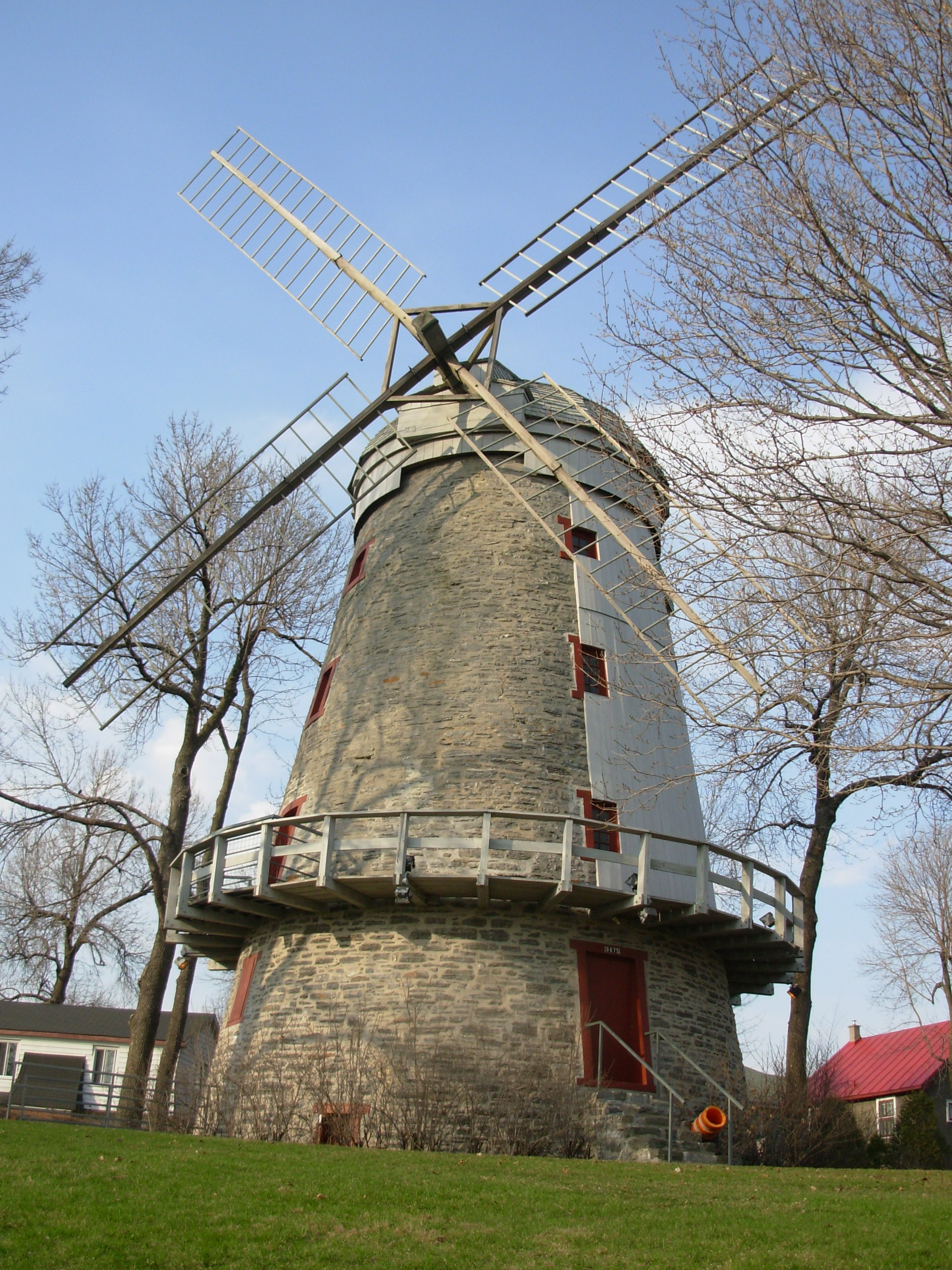
Fleming windmill, Lasalle

Among LaSalle's attractions are Angrignon Mall, the Lachine Canal and the Canal de l'Aqueduc, with their recreational areas; the Octagone library; the Parc Angrignon; the Île aux Hérons migratory bird refuge; the Saints-Anges archeological site; Des Rapides Park; and the Fleming windmill, which is used as the borough's symbol. Other major installations include the Cégep André-Laurendeau.

== Economy ==
LaSalle's main economic engines include industries and agrifoods:

- Seagram's Distillery
- Fleischmann's Yeast
- Labatt's Brewery
- Angrignon Taxi
- Carrefour Angrignon

== Infrastructure ==
LaSalle is served by the LaSalle commuter train station on the Candiac Line. Angrignon metro is right near the border of LaSalle located in Le Sud-Ouest. Route 138 passes through the borough before crossing the Honoré Mercier Bridge to Kahnawake. Other important thoroughfares include LaSalle, Newman, La Vérendrye, Bishop Power, Champlain, Shevchenko, Dollard, Lapierre, Centrale and Jean-Brillon Boulevards.

Despite its name, the Montreal Metro station of LaSalle is not located in LaSalle, but on a portion of the boulevard of the same name in Verdun.

== Sports and recreation ==
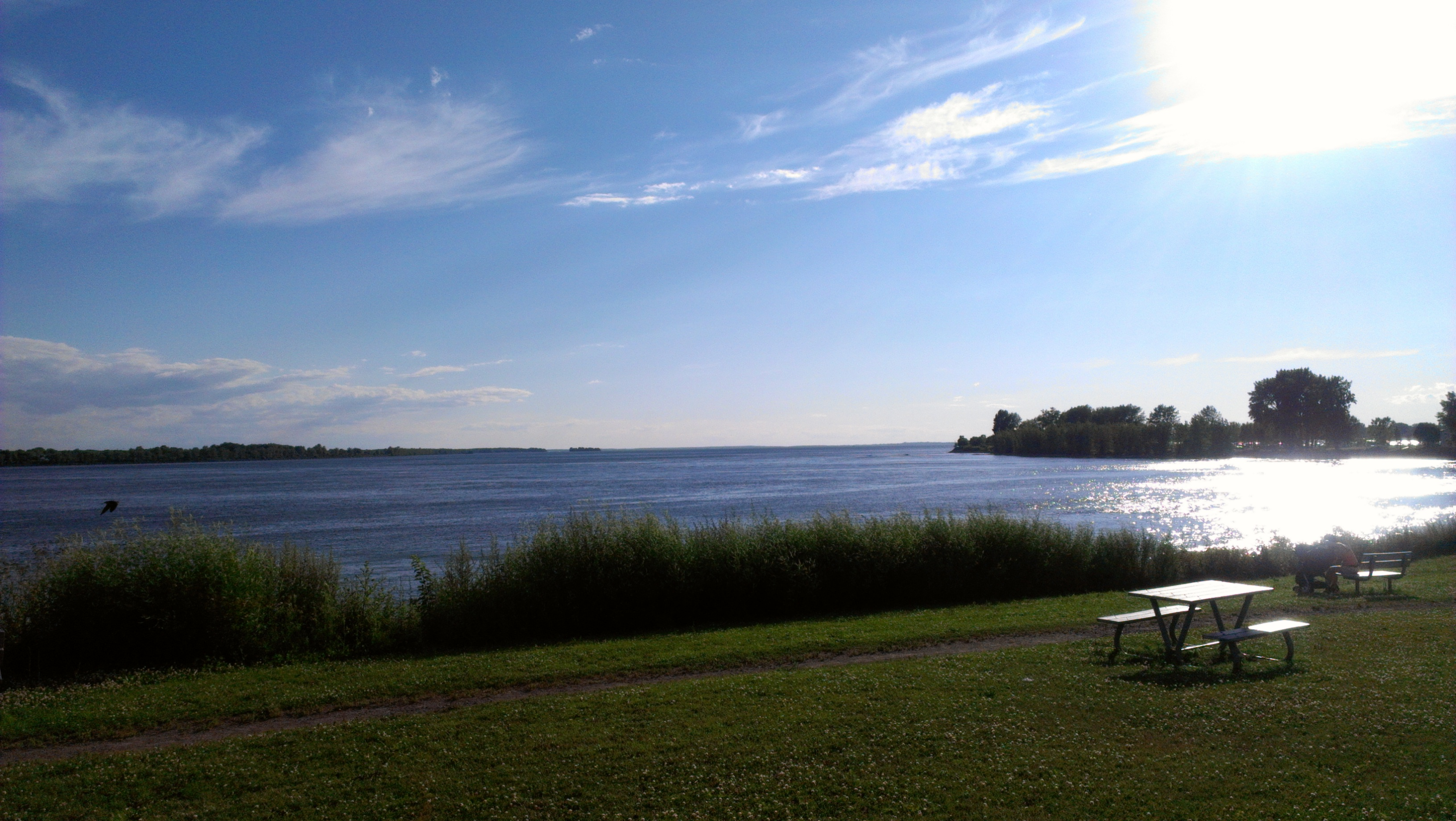
Saint Lawrence River seen from LaSalle Blvd. bicycle path.

LaSalle also has various sports teams, the football association (Warriors), the hockey association (Cougars), the baseball association (LaSalle Cardinals) and the soccer association (LaSalle Rapids) which remain popular. The Cardinals play their home games at Stade Éloi-Viau. The first ever cricket team called "LaSalle Strikers" came into existence in 2015. Former home of Pop Harrigan Hockey and LaSalle Colts Football.

== Notable residents, former and current ==
=== Notable people ===
- John Campbell, city councilor and federal liberal member of Parliament
- Michel Leduc (~1931-2012), last mayor of LaSalle (1983-2001) before amalgamation
- Stéphane Rousseau, actor and comedian, born 1966 in LaSalle
- Mononc' Serge, singer-songwriter and former bassist of Les Colocs, born 1970 in LaSalle
- Marie-Élaine Thibert, pop singer, born 1982 in LaSalle
- Jonathan Emile, reggae and hiphop singer, born 1986 in LaSalle

=== Notable athletes ===
- Jo-Anne Beaumier, Canadian-Lebanese footballer
- Chris Benoit, Canadian wrestler
- Patrick Carpentier, race car driver
- William Carrier, NHL hockey player
- Jeff Chychrun, retired NHL hockey player
- Nicolas Deslauriers, NHL hockey player
- Miguel Duhamel, professional motorcycle racer
- Yvon Duhamel, professional motorcycle racer
- Daniel Guérard, retired NHL hockey player
- Mike Krushelnyski, retired NHL hockey player
- Patrick Labrecque, hockey coach and former player
- Jacques Lemaire, retired NHL hockey player
- Mike O'Neill, retired NHL hockey player
- Gaetano Orlando, retired NHL hockey player
- Eliezer Sherbatov (born 1991), Canadian-Israeli ice hockey player
- Gilles Gratton retired NHL goaltender.
- Simon Proulx-Sénécal, is a Canadian-born ice dancer who competes for Armenia.

== See also ==
- Montreal Merger
- Boroughs of Montreal
- List of former cities in Quebec
- Districts of Montreal
- Municipal reorganization in Quebec
