= List of rivers and water bodies of Montreal Island =

The rivers and water bodies of Montreal are few and mostly artificial. The hydrography of the island of Montreal remained intact until approximately the 19th century, when Montreal underwent major urban works, including the construction of the Lachine Canal and the creation of the first major parks of Montreal.

== History ==
=== Last Ice Age ===
After the Ice Age, around 13,000 years ago, Montreal and the Saint Lawrence Lowlands were flooded by the Champlain Sea. Within a few centuries, when these waters receded, Mount Royal and its three summits emerged as islands. With the complete withdrawal of the sea, water was retained in some depressions of the island. This was the case of Beaver Lake, located between the summits of Mount Royal. This gradually dried up to become a fen. It was artificially dredged (excavated) in 1938.

=== Before 19th century ===
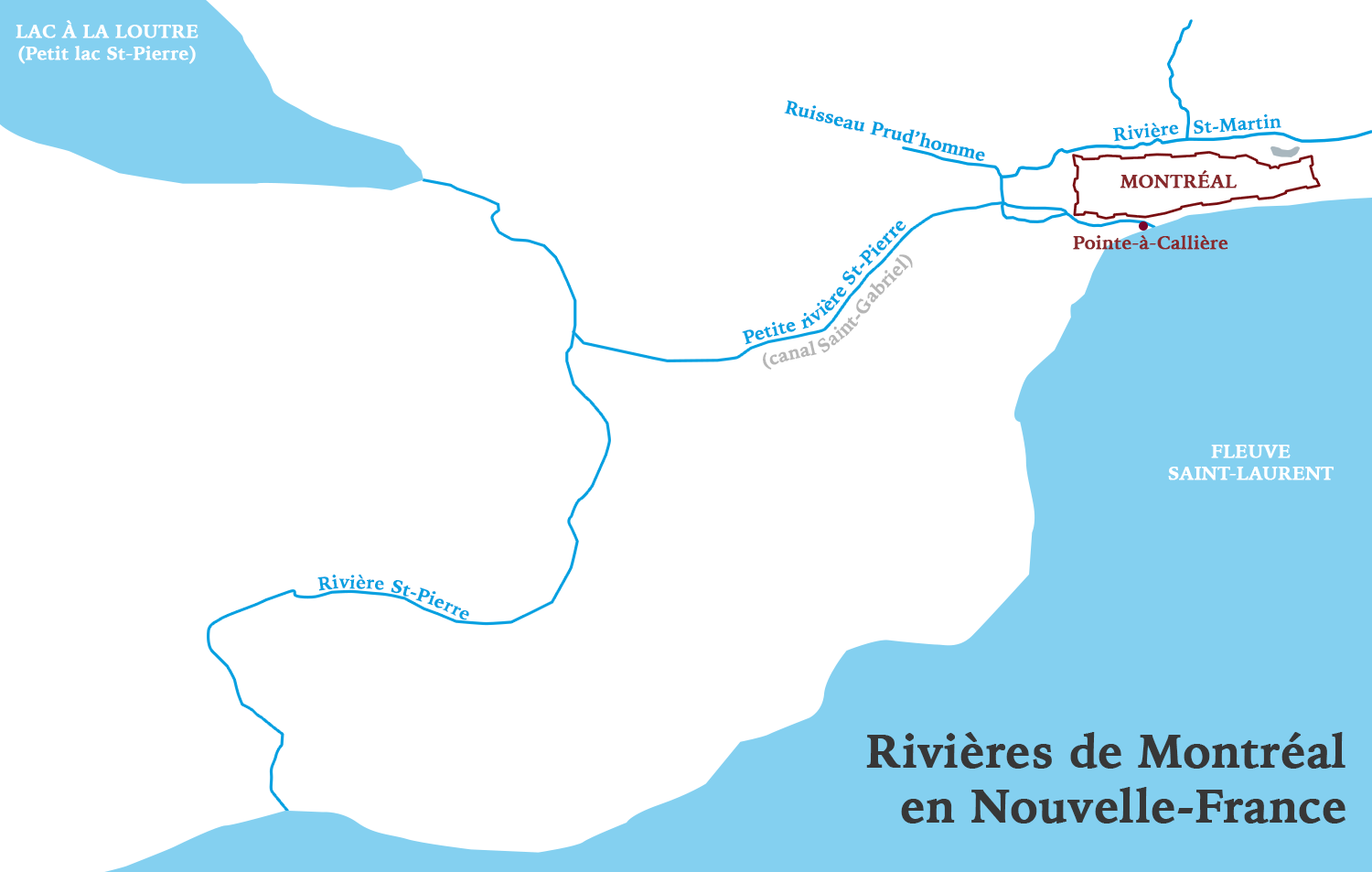
Approximation streams near the fortifications of the city of Montreal in New France

There used to be a complex hydrology, which is now destroyed or channeled.

- Otter Lake (or small lake St. Peter): about four (4) kilometres long by about one (1) kilometre wide, a marshy lake that was halfway between Old Montreal and Lachine, south of Quartier Latin, the Saint-Jacques Escarpment, and west of the Turcot Interchange. It was backfilled and gradually dried up, particularly with the construction of the Lachine Canal and the sector's industrialization. Today Highway 20 runs through its length and breadth in the centre.
- Saint Pierre River: started in Côte-des-Neiges down to Notre-Dame-de-Grâce and widened forming Lake Otter. It then narrowed back to a river and lead to the St. Lawrence River in Nuns' Island.
- Little St. Pierre River: created artificially in 1697 under the name of "St. Gabriel Canal". This channel connected the Saint-Pierre River (in the east part of Lake Otter) up to the Pointe-à-Callière Museum. One part was channelled as a sewer (William collector) in 1832. The Pointe-à-Callière Museum made it a public place around 2017.
- Saint Martin River or Little River: It begins at Mount Royal Cemetery through Outremont, Quebec and the Mile End district and the Plateau Mont-Royal district until La Fontaine Park (including the pond is a remnant). Then it branched off westward through the Quartier Latin district and ran along the Montreal fortifications to the river. There are still some traces of the river.

=== Today ===
Today there are only a handful of streams and lakes in nature. However, many parks have ponds or artificial lakes of large size.

== List of water bodies ==
Below is a partial list of current waters bodies of the island:

Name	Photo	Location	Contact information	Type	Area (ha)
Lachine Canal		Montreal	45.4607°N 73.6046°W	artificial	158 hectares (390 acres)
Canal de l'Aqueduc		Montreal	45.4363°N 73.5994°W	artificial	
Olympic pool		Jean-Drapeau Park	45.5089°N 73.5238°W	artificial	24 hectares (59 acres)
Lake Île Notre-Dame		Jean-Drapeau Park	45.5023°N 73.5253°W	artificial	14 hectares (35 acres)
Centennial Lake		Dollard-Des Ormeaux	45.4868°N 73.8143°W	artificial	9.8 hectares (24 acres)
Lac des Dauphins		Jean-Drapeau Park	45.5241°N 73.5364°W	artificial	5 hectares (12 acres)
Lac des Battures		Nuns' Island	45.4545°N 73.5546°W	artificial	5 hectares (12 acres)
Main pond Parc Angrignon		Angrignon Park	45.4430°N 73.6014°W	artificial	4.8 hectares (12 acres)
Little Basin		Parc des Rapides	45.4278°N 73.5914°W	artificial	3.5 hectares (8.6 acres)
Swan Lake		Jean-Drapeau Park	45.5087°N 73.5344°W	artificial	3 hectares (7.4 acres)
Pond Fountain		Parc La Fontaine	45.5248°N 73.5691°W	artificial	2.8 hectares (6.9 acres)
Beaver Lake		Mount Royal Park	45.4986°N 73.5974°W	artificial	1.9 hectares (4.7 acres)
Basin Jarry Park		Jarry Park	45.5353°N 73.6249°W	artificial	1 hectare (2.5 acres)

== List of rivers ==
- Rivière à l'Orme
- Bertrand Brook
- Saint Pierre River (Montreal)
- Lachine Canal
- Canal de l'Aqueduc
- St. Lawrence River
- Rivière des Prairies

== See also ==
- Blue Network of Montreal
- List of rivers of Quebec
- List of Quebec water channels
