= Saint Pierre River (Montreal) =

Saint-Pierre River
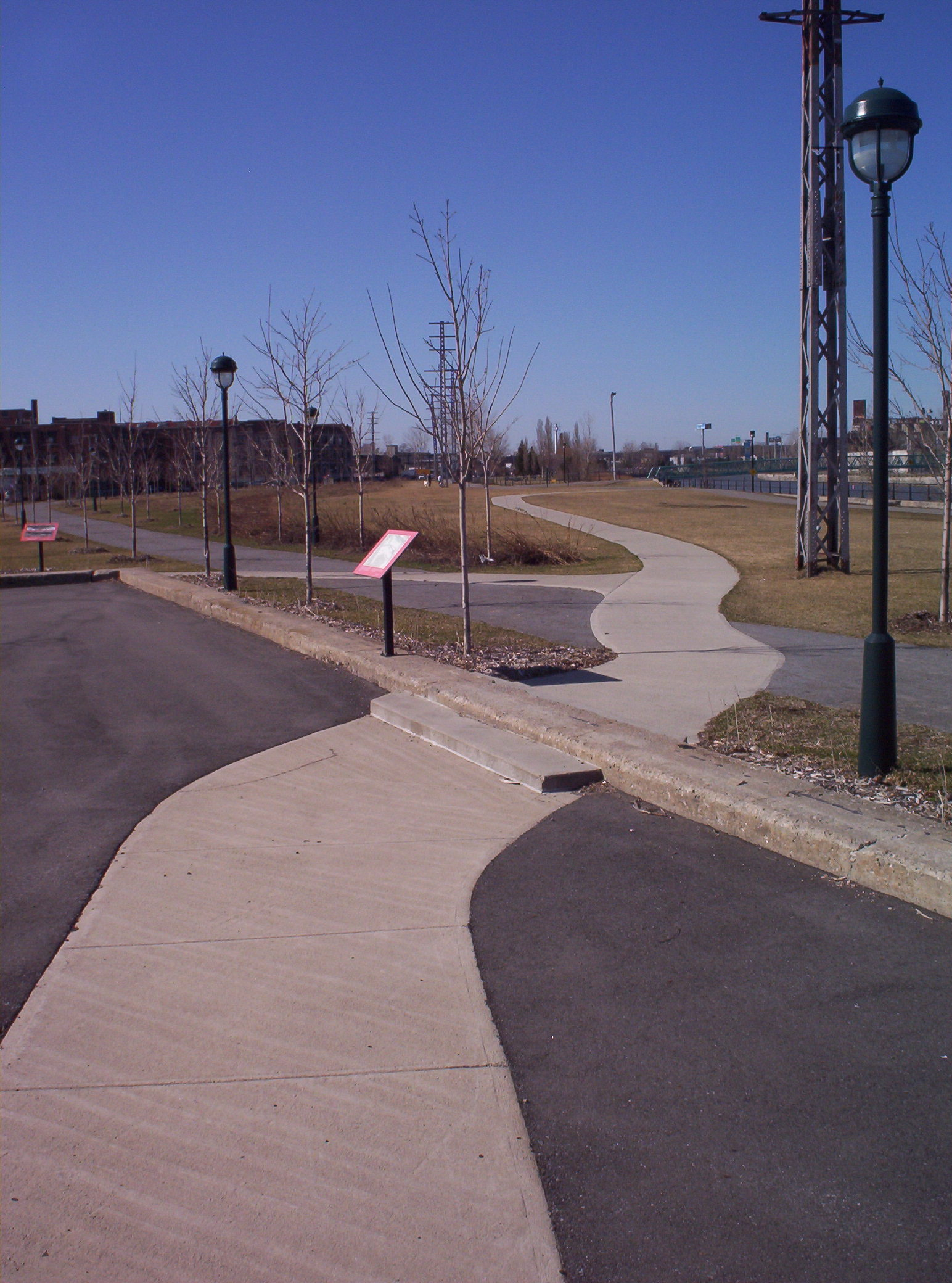
- Memorial site of the former site of the Saint-Pierre River near the Côte-Saint-Paul locks of the Lachine Canal

Location
- Country: Canada
- Province: Quebec

Physical characteristics
- Mouth
  - location: St Lawrence River, Montreal
  - coordinates: 45°30′11″N 73°33′12″W
  - elevation: 9 m (30 ft)

The Saint Pierre River (French: rivière Saint-Pierre, pronounced [ʁivjɛʁ sɛ̃ pjɛʁ]) was a river in the city of Montreal, Quebec, Canada, flowing into the St. Lawrence River. The city of Montreal was founded at its mouth, at the height of the site Pointe-à-Callière Museum.

== Description ==
The Saint Pierre river originated in the west of Montreal Island; one branch led to the current Old Port of Montreal and the other poured into the river near the Aqueduct of Montreal in Verdun. Not far from the Saint-Jacques escarpment, the river formed Otter Lake at the present location of the Turcot Interchange.

== History ==
The river was long used as a sewer by area residents. In 1832, for safety's sake, it was decided to bury it by channeling in the nearby area Pointe-à-Callière Museum. The various other sections of the river were also buried in the following decades. The development of the property previously located southwest of the river resulted in no visible traces remaining of the river. In 1990, the collector was filled with sand, causing the complete disappearance of the river.

The sewer's relics can be seen at the Pointe-à-Callière Museum, while a section of its route is visible near the Côte-Saint-Paul locks of the Lachine Canal.

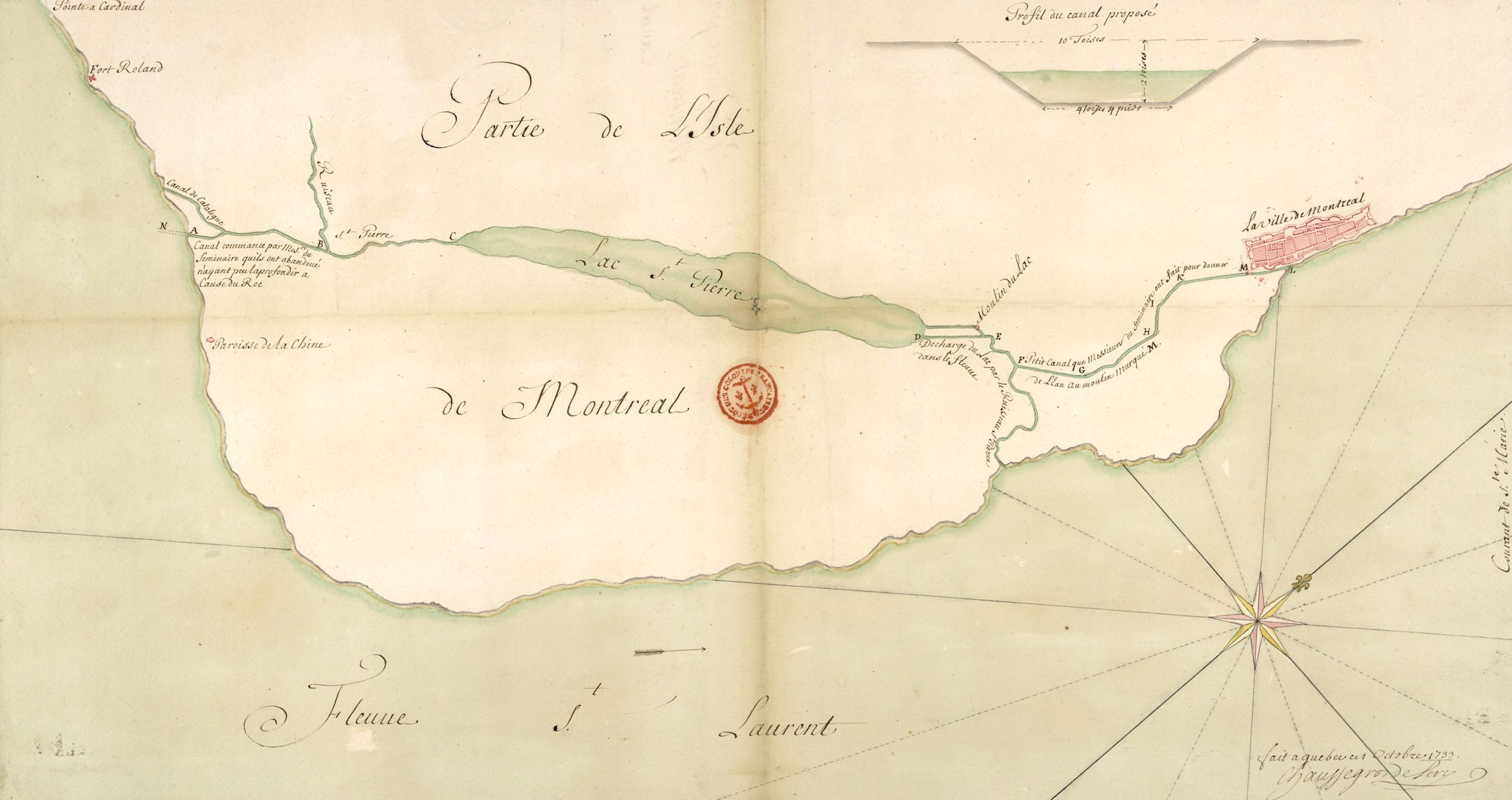
Ruisseau St Pierre can be seen on the map on the vertical.

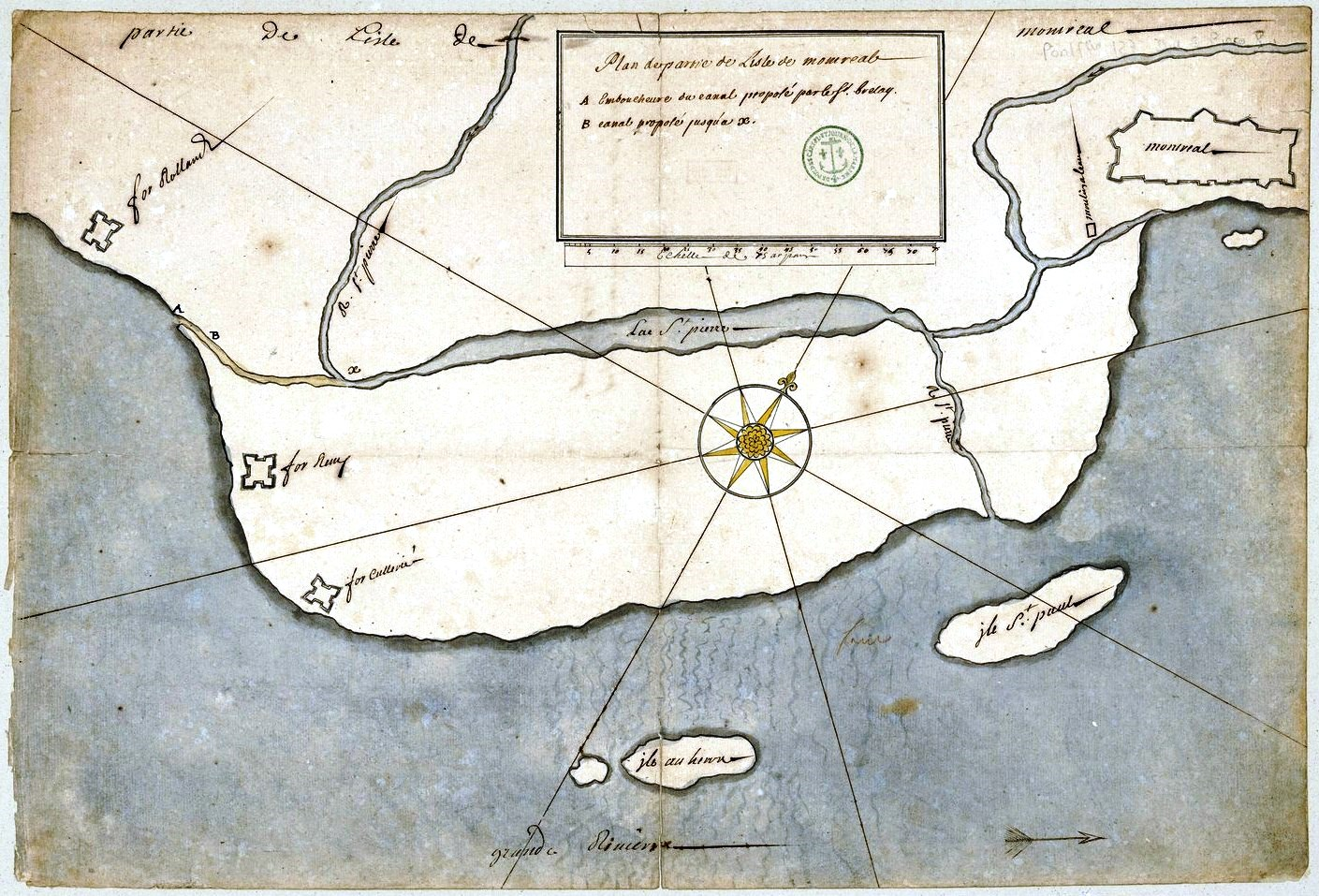
Map of Montreal
Little St. Pierre River passes between the Pointe à Callière and the walled city

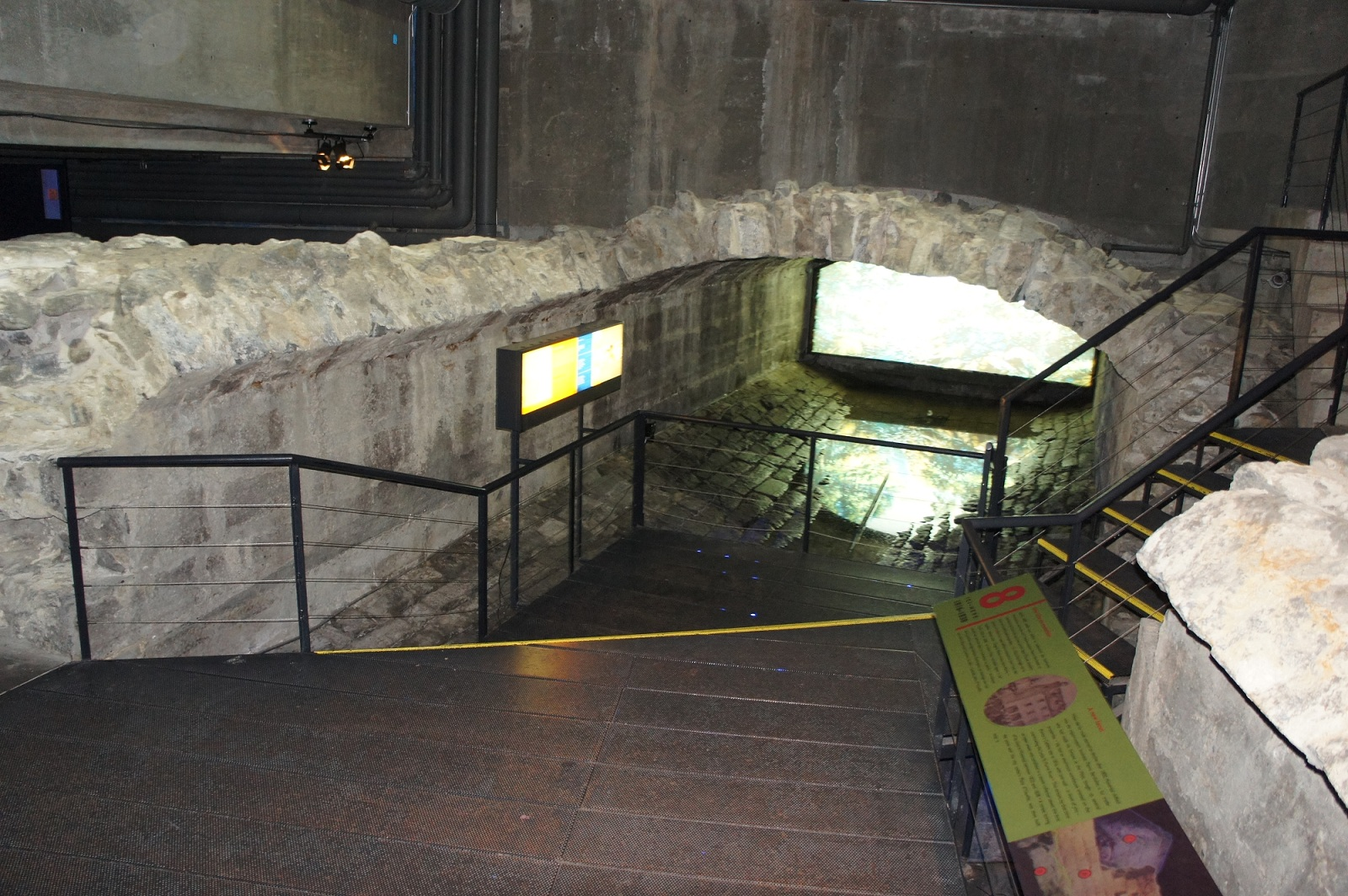
Pointe-à-Callière Museum
William collector

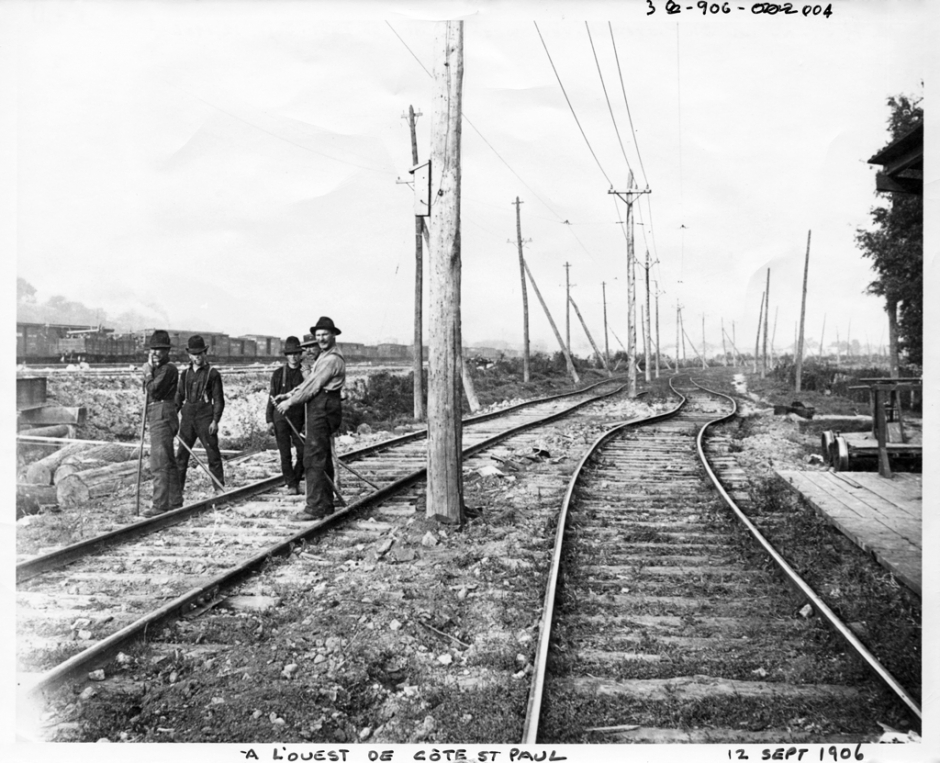
Railwaymen to work after a flooding of the Saint-Pierre River at west of the road to Côte-Saint-Paul in 1906

== See also ==
- List of rivers and water bodies of Montreal Island
- List of rivers of Quebec
- Lachine Canal
- Pointe-à-Callière Museum
