= Centre des arts Juliette-Lassonde =

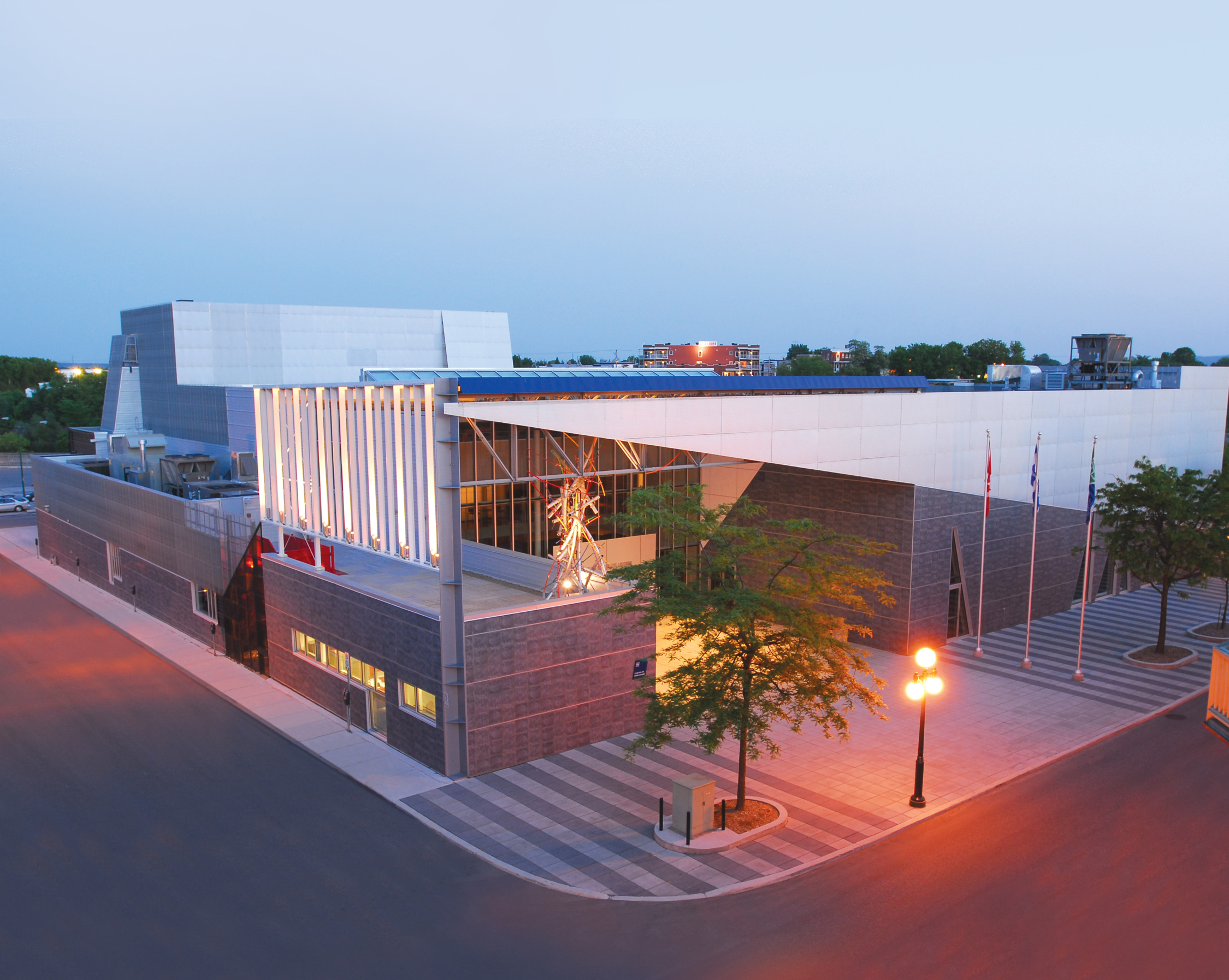
- Interactive map of Centre des arts Juliette-Lassonde
- Address: Saint-Hyacinthe, Quebec, Canada
- Coordinates: 45.622823°N 72.945552°W
- Capacity: Salle Desjardins: 700; Espace Rona: 600; Scène ING: 5000

Construction
- Opened: January 2006
- Architect: Dan Hanganu

Website
- http://www.centredesarts.ca/

The Centre des arts Juliette-Lassonde is a cultural complex located in Saint-Hyacinthe, Quebec, Canada.

== Cultural role ==
Centre des arts Juliette-Lassonde is a major cultural site for the Monteregian region. It accommodates professional artists, the local arts community in performing arts, and the visual arts community. It is particularly important for the regional county municipality Les Maskoutains, whose population of 80,000 residents can take advantage of it.

Several artists with a national and international reputation have performed at the centre, including Salvatore Adamo, Gary Kurtz, Oliver Jones, Roch Voisine, André-Philippe Gagnon, Michel Rivard, l'Montreal Symphony Orchestra, Stéphane Rousseau, Richard Desjardins, Zachary Richard, Claude Dubois, Isabelle Boulay, Jorane, Édith Butler, Richard Séguin, Angèle Dubeau, Pascale Picard Band, Vincent Vallières, Luce Dufault, Marco Calliari, and Kevin Parent.

== Investment and construction ==
The cost of the centre's construction grew to $12 million Canadian dollars. Funding was provided by both the Canadian federal and Québec provincial governments, together with the City of Saint-Hyacinthe, as well as private donations collected by a fundraising campaign. The technical equipment of the hall is among the best in terms of sound quality and technology in Québec.

== History ==
In 1990, the city of Saint-Hyacinthe performed surveys and consultations with the population. In 1998, the year of celebrations of the 250th anniversary of the founding of the city, the position paper "City of the twenty-first century" relaunched the idea of a centre for entertainment in the city centre, to meet the needs of local and regional cultural organizations. The construction of the complex was started in 2004, with the approval of the Ministry of Culture and Communications of Québec (MCCQ), and ended in December 2005.

The centre was named in honour of Juliette Lassonde, the mother of four famous children :

- Pierre Lassonde, President of Newmont Mining, the largest gold producer in the world, who also gave his name to the Pavilions Lassonde of the École Polytechnique de Montréal
- Judge Michel Lassonde, of the Civil Division of the Court of Quebec
- Dr. Jean Lassonde, specialist at Hospital Maisonneuve-Rosemont
- Louise Lassonde, a resident of Geneva, Switzerland.

Juliette Lassonde was a food journalist for the newspaper Le Clairon, Le Courrier de Saint-Hyacinthe, and the "Journal Monday". She was a member of the International Federation of the press and gourmet wine-tourism and Circle member of the women journalists. Juliette Lassonde died April 9, 2005, at the age of 91.
