= Old Custom House (Montreal) =

Historic site in Quebec, Canada

Custom House
- Ancienne-Douane
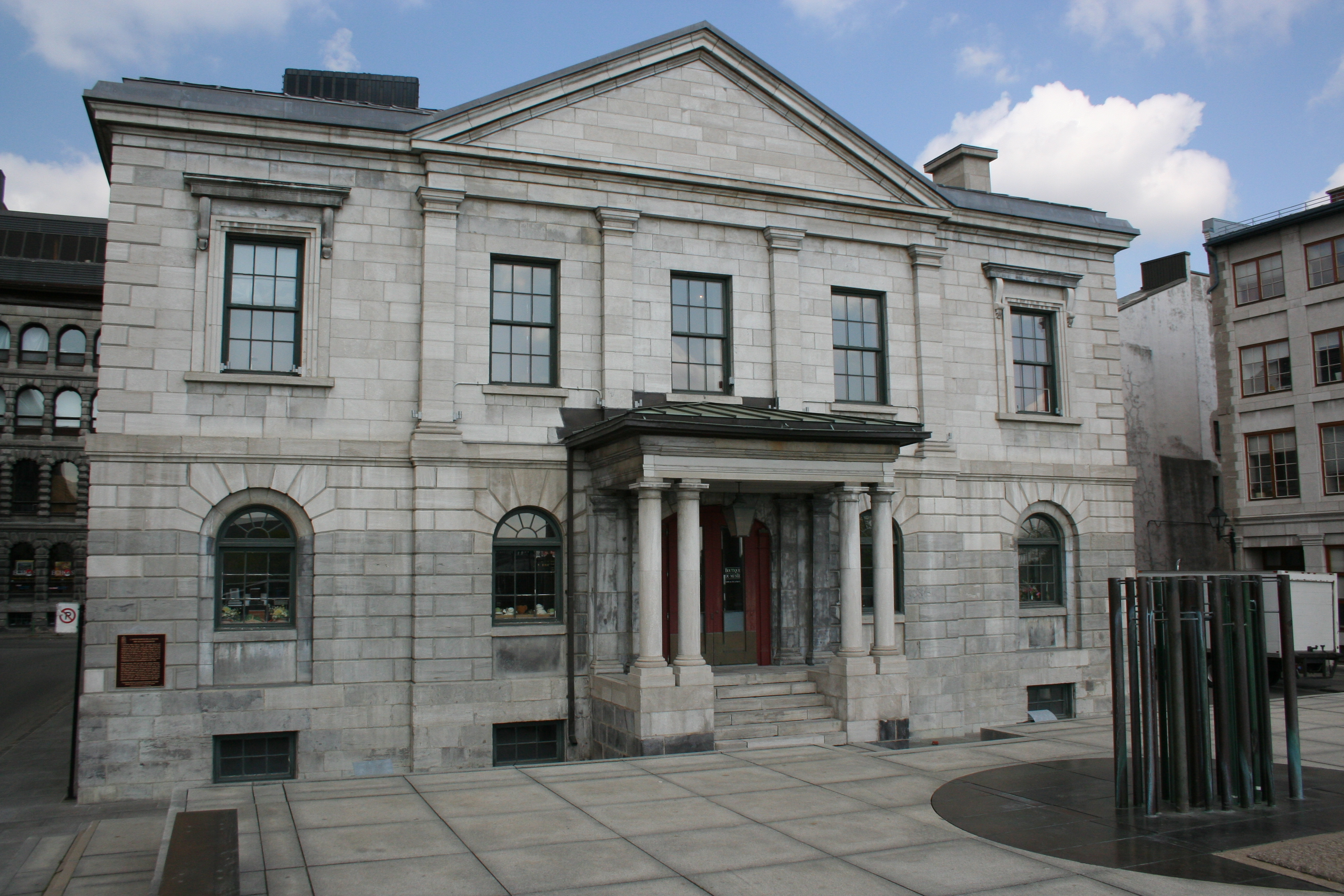
- Interactive map of the Custom House area

General information
- Architectural style: Palladian revival
- Coordinates: 45.502565°N 73.554218°W
- Construction started: 1836
- Completed: 1838
- Renovated: 1881-1882

Design and construction
- Architect: John Ostell

National Historic Site of Canada
- Official name: Former Montreal Custom House National Historic Site of Canada
- Designated: 1997

The Old Custom House (French: Ancienne-Douane) is a building in what is now Old Montreal, which served as Montreal's first custom house. The building was completed in 1836, designed by Montreal architect John Ostell in the Palladian revival style. It is a National Historic Site of Canada. It now houses the fr:Fondation J. Armand Bombardier Pavilion of the Pointe-à-Callière Museum. The permanent exhibition Come Aboard! Pirates or Privateers? and a lunchroom recreating the look of a New France inn are in the building.

== Gallery ==
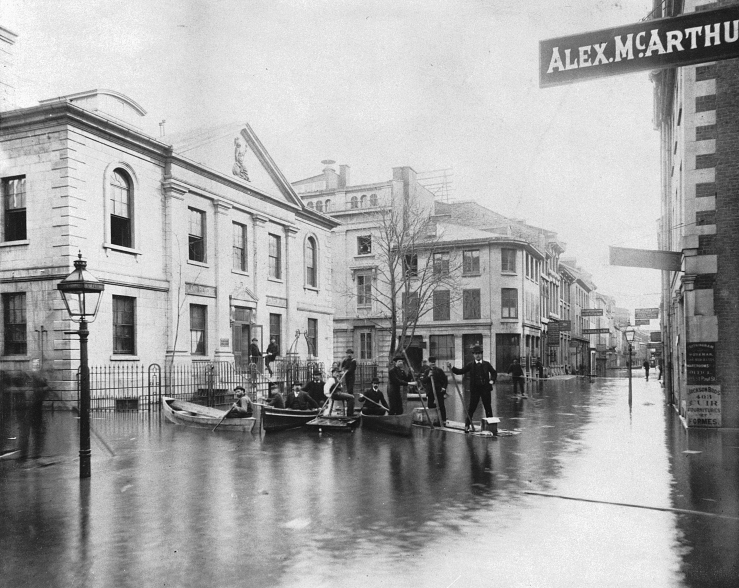
In 1886 during a flood

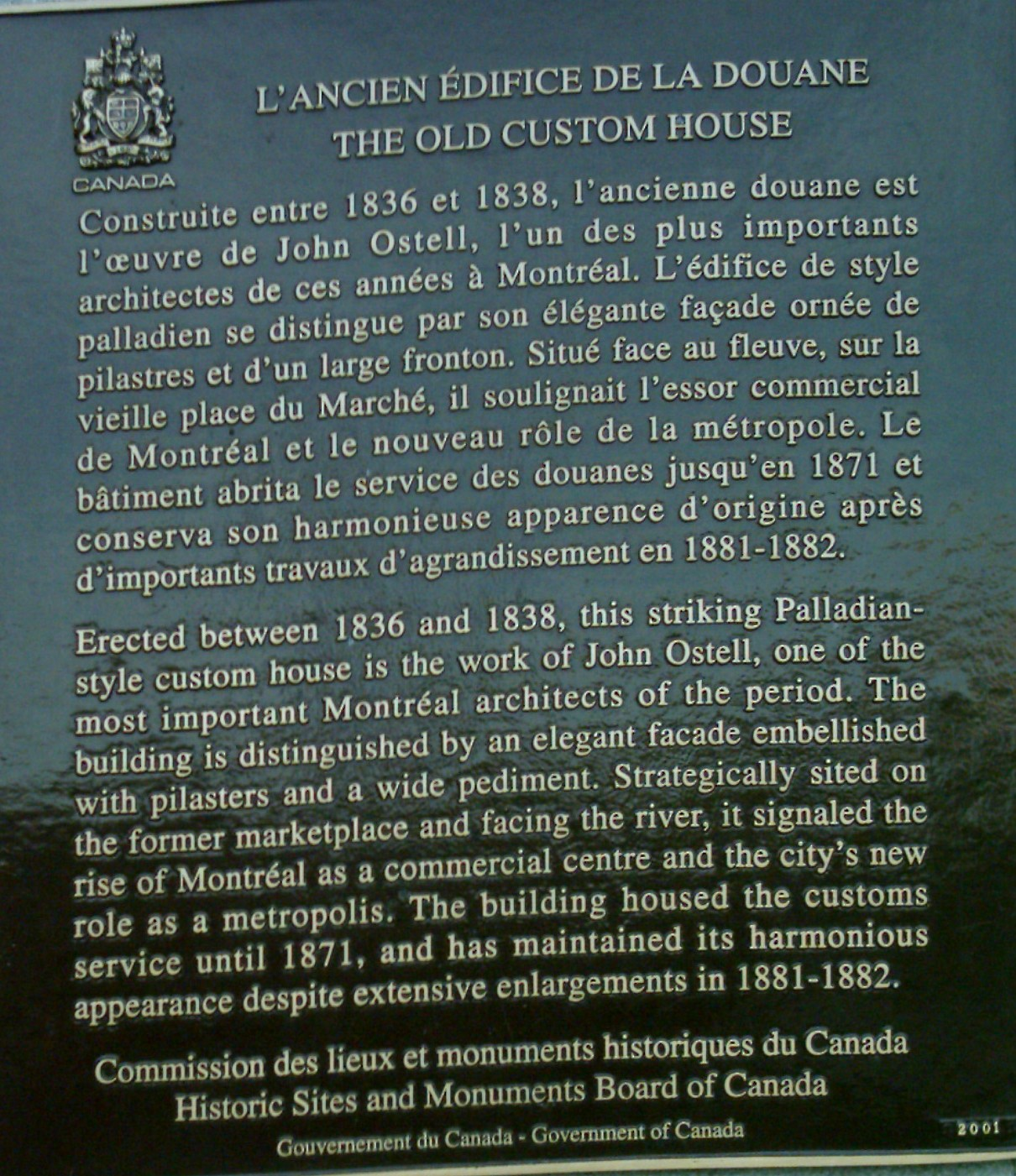
Historical marker
