= Beaver Lake (Montreal) =

Artificial basin fitted on a former swamp in Montreal, Quebec, Canada

Beaver Lake Lac aux Castors (French)
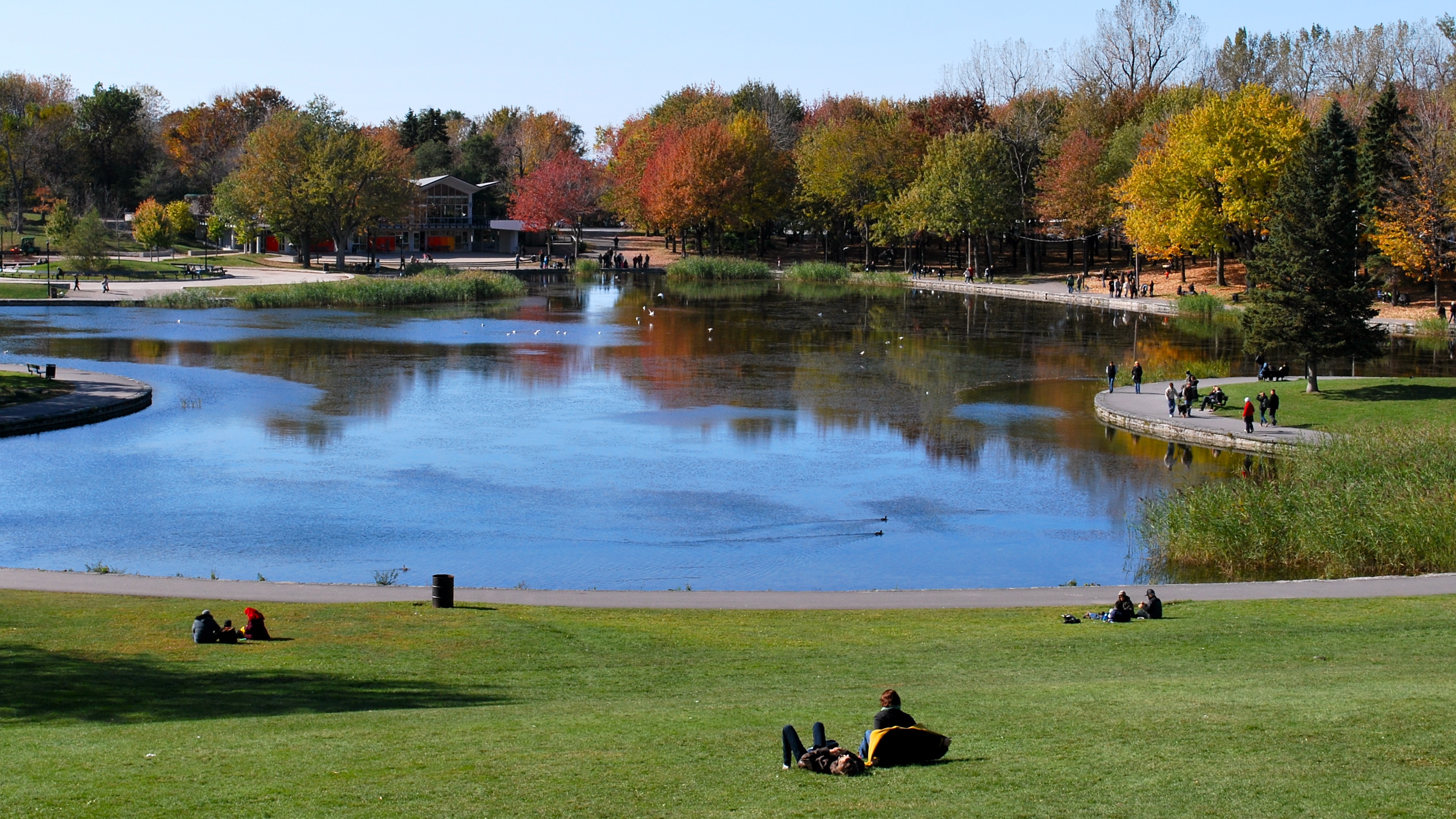
- View of Beaver Lake

- Location within Montreal
- Location: Montreal, Quebec, Canada
- Coordinates: 45°29′56″N 73°35′49″W
- Type: Artificial
- Max. length: 0.24 km (0.15 mi)
- Surface elevation: 172 m (564 ft)

The Beaver Lake (French: Lac aux Castors) is an artificial basin fitted in 1938 on a former swamp located on Mount Royal, in Montreal, Quebec, Canada. It was designed by architect Frederick Todd.

It takes its name from an old beaver dam discovered during the work.

== Description ==
About 200 metres (660 ft) by 150 metres (490 ft), Beaver Lake is shaped like a four-leafed clover. It was traditionally used as an outdoor rink in winter, but this practice ended in 2017, and skating now takes place on an artificial rink nearby. A canoe can be rented and used on this lake during the summer. The lake's average depth is approximately 15m and is said to cover approximately 1.5 hectares (15000m²).

The surroundings of the lake are equipped for various recreational activities: skating and sliding in the winter and vast lawns in the summer.

== History ==
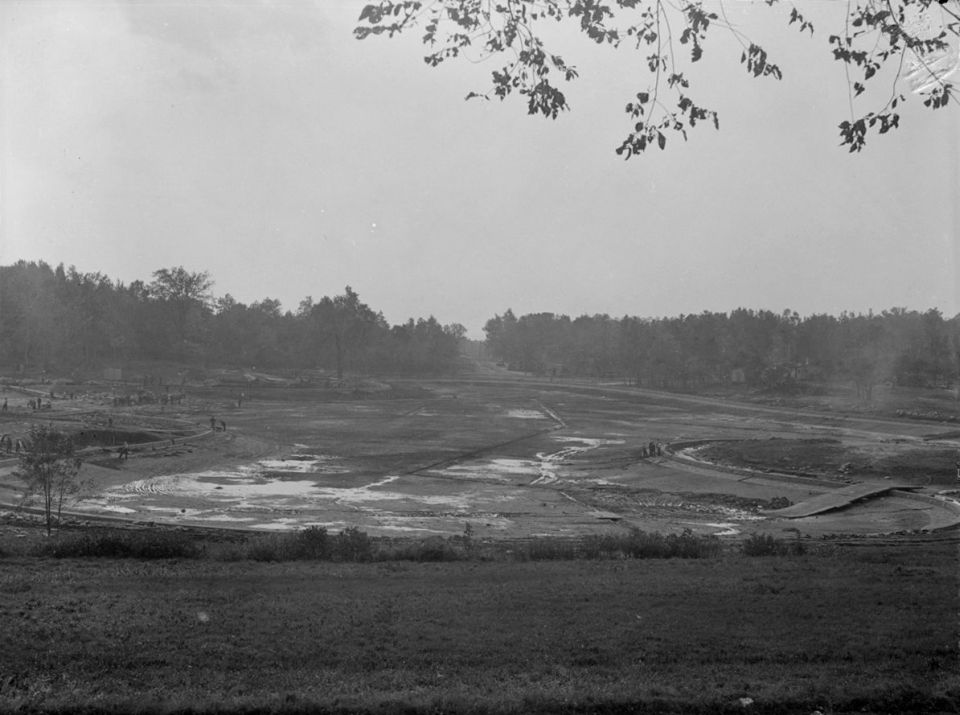
Workers adjusting the lake in 1938

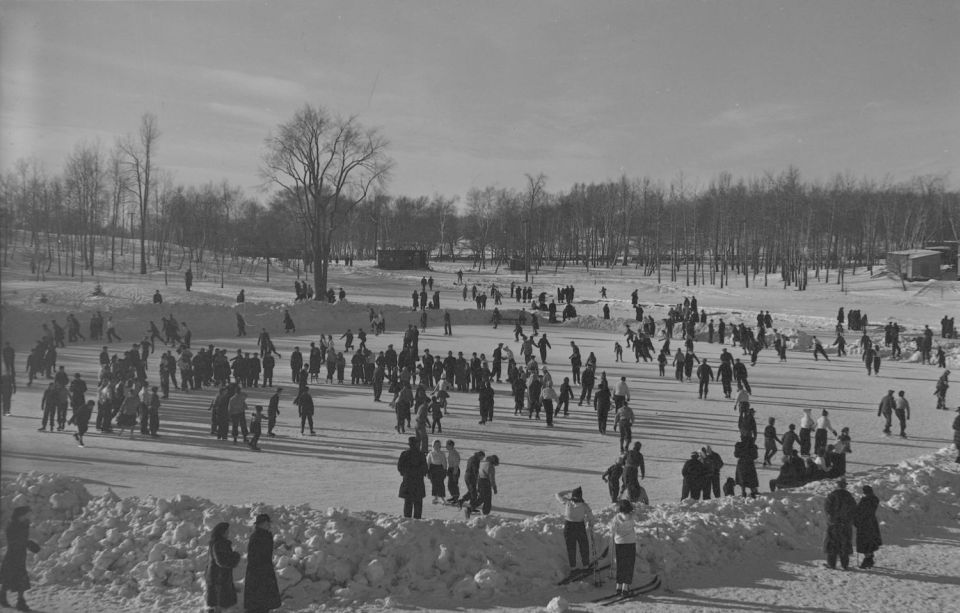
Skaters on the lake in 1940

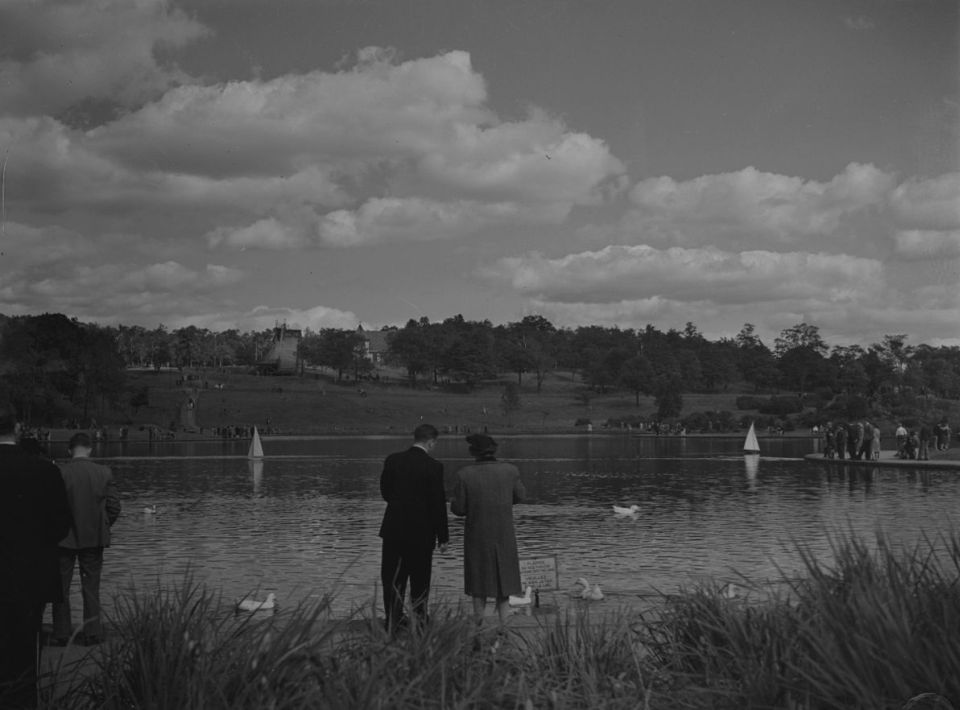
Walkers in 1945

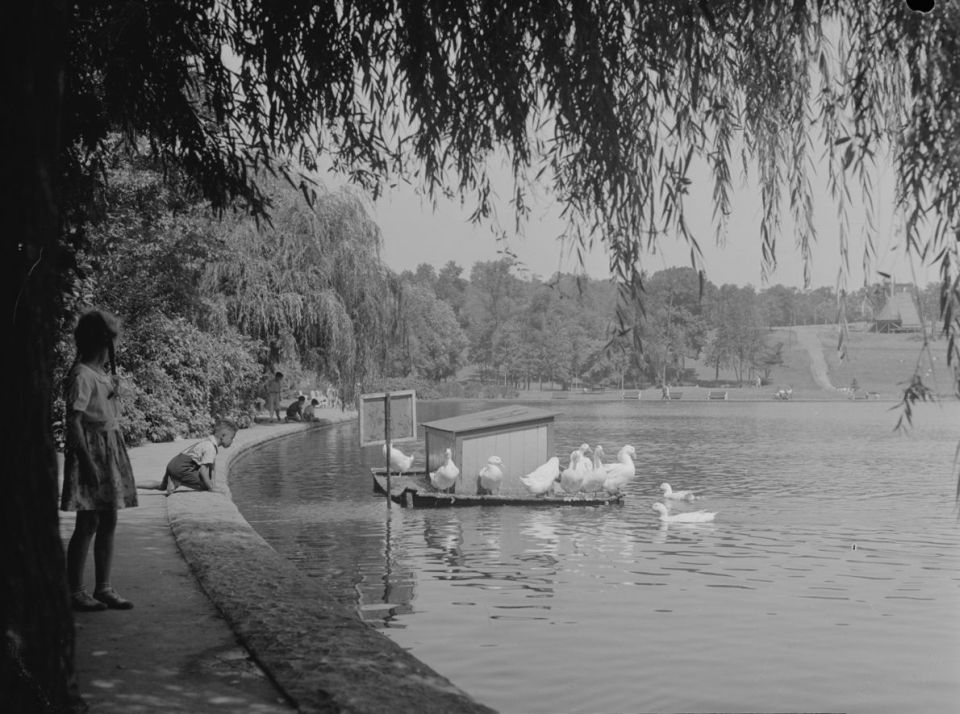
Ducks stand next to a shelter on a raft floating on the lake

=== The Beaver Lake pavilion ===
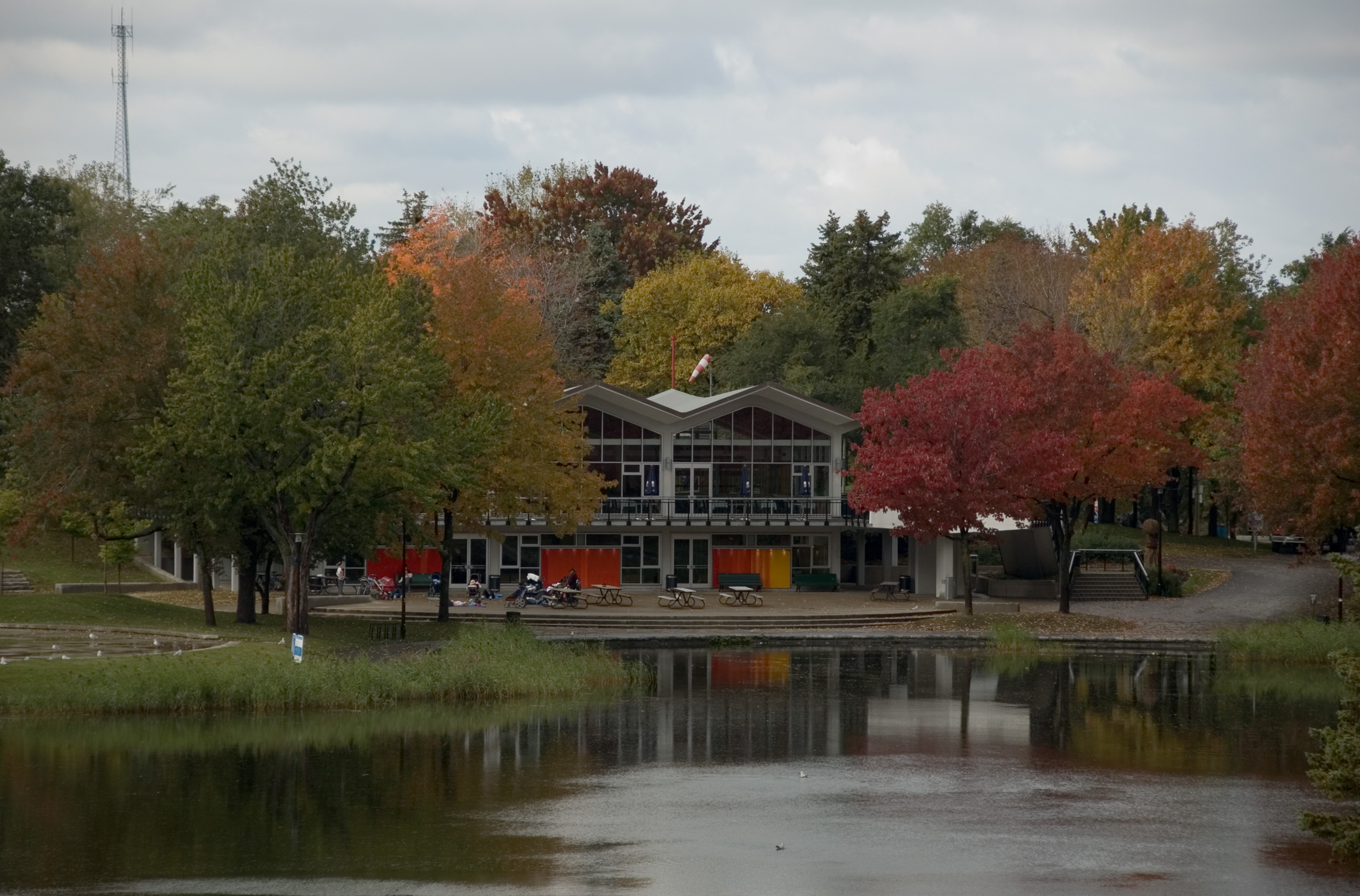
Beaver Lake pavilion was inaugurated in 1961

Built between 1956 and 1958 and inaugurated in 1961, the pavilion is located west of the lake. Designed by architects Hazen Sise and Guy Desbarats of Montreal-based architectural firm Arcop, it was considered one of the most innovative buildings in Montreal, with a corrugated roof and large windows. It was renovated in 2005-2007.

The pavilion houses a restaurant named The Pavilion.

In 2007, the Ordre des architectes du Québec (Order of Architects of Quebec) awarded the Excellence Award in architecture to architects Pierina Saia and Réal Paul and to the City of Montreal for the conservation and heritage restoration of the Beaver Lake Pavilion.

== See also ==
- List of rivers and water bodies of Montreal Island
