= Frederick Todd =

Landscape architect in Canada

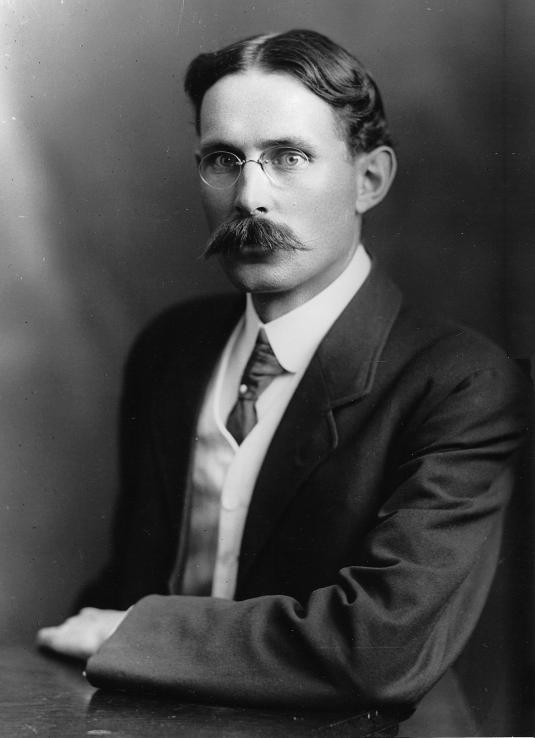
- Frederick Todd
- Born: March 11, 1876; Concord, New Hampshire
- Died: February 15, 1948 (aged 71); Montreal
- Occupation: landscape architect
- Spouse: Beatrice
- Children: Evelyn M. Todd and Frederick G. Todd Jr.

Frederick Gage Todd (March 11, 1876 – February 15, 1948) was the first resident landscape architect in Canada. For the majority of his life he was one of a small group committed to the art and practice of structuring urban growth in the first half of the century. His projects ranged from Vancouver, B.C. to St John's, Newfoundland, from the smallest scale details of garden design to a study of the nation's capital.

== Chronological events ==
Frederick G. Todd was born March 11, 1876, in Concord, New Hampshire. He attended the agricultural college in Amherst, Massachusetts, where he studied botany, biology, agriculture and site engineering. After completing school in 1896 he became an apprentice as a landscape architect with the firm of Olmsted, Olmsted and Eliot, in Brookline, Massachusetts, until he moved to Montreal in 1900. During Todd's time in Montreal he established the first resident practices of landscape architecture in Canada. In 1903 Todd prepared a comprehensive report on the future growth of the nation's capital for the Ottawa Improvement Commission. Between 1904 and 1907 Todd prepared and executed the plans for Assiniboine Park in Winnipeg and Wascana Park in Regina, and developed a prototype for future garden cities. In 1905 he became a fellow of the American Society of Landscape Architects. Between 1907 and 1912 Frederick designed three major garden city projects in British Columbia; Shaughnessy Heights and Point Grey in Vancouver, and Port Mann on the Fraser River. From 1913 to 1918 he designed and supervised major urban parks in Quebec City and Bowring Park in St. John's, Newfoundland as well as developed the model city plan for the town of Mount Royal Montreal. Todd also worked as a consultant for Alcan and designed a number of private gardens and institutional grounds as well as urban parks for smaller urban communities between 1918 and 1930. From 1930 to 1940 he designed and supervised major public works projects in Quebec during the depression including St. Helen's Island (1936), Beaver Lake in Mount Royal Park (1939) and developed a proposal for an impressive sports centre for the British Empire and Olympic Games in Maisonneuve Park, Montreal (1938). In 1939, Todd was elected president of the Quebec Horticultural Society. In 1945, he was appointed vice-president of the City Improvement League, Montreal. Between 1945 and 1948 he initiated plans and supervised construction of the Garden of the Way of the Cross adjacent to St. Joseph's Oratory. On February 15, 1948, he died in Montreal at the age of 71.

== Design projects ==
While working under Frederick Law Olmsted's firm, Todd helped with the design plan for Mount Royal along with many houses designed by William Sutherland Maxwell and Edward Maxwell. It is said that when Frederick Todd began working on his own that his "influence on his home city of Montreal was profound", which included many works created for private or public, along with individuals and groups. Some of his works in Montreal included St. Helen's Island Park (Île Sainte-Hélène), Beaver Lake on Mount Royal and the Garden of the Way of the Cross at St. Joseph's Oratory. Todd was also the designer for some other public spaces, for example, the Plains of Abraham, the National Capital, which was the Ottawa Improvement Commission Report.

Todd masterminded the bucolic lots found in the elite Shaughnessy Heights in Vancouver, B.C., the 1907 neighbourhood built for the Canadian Pacific Railway. Later projects include St. John's Bowring Park, and design plans for Trinity College in Toronto. Todd also worked on a number of smaller projects including residences and works for other cities within Canada.

Todd was involved in a number of organizations including the City Improvement League (Montreal), the Olmsted Legacy, the director of the Parks and Playgrounds Association (Montreal), and the Community Garden League of Montreal. He was appointed to Montreal City Council as a representative of the City Improvement League. He was very active and "devoted much time and energy to a variety of civic institutions and was a fellow of three professional organizations: the American Society of Landscape Architects, the Canadian Society of Landscape Architects and the Town Planning Institute of Canada" (Todd, 1).

== Importance ==
Frederick G. Todd is an influential and important figure in history for a few reasons. Although he is not a well known landscape architect, even in Canada, he created many spaces that still remain today. He was considered a "modest man whose work and ideals are little known," however he is responsible for much of Canada's beauty and usefulness (Todd, 1). Todd worked on many improvement plans for the communities that also made him very influential to most of North America. He created many designs that dealt with "parks, open spaces, public institutions, roadways, and neighborhoods," some of which were donations and gifts to the communities (CSLA, 1).

One of the most defining points of Frederick Todd as a designer was how he "popularized naturalistic landscape designs and the idea of a 'necklace of parks' as linked open spaces- a concept still used today" (OALA, 1). Many people respect Canadian landscape architects for three main features that most exhibit in their professional practices; creativity, sensitivity, and practicality. Todd was a person that, although not widely known, was considered "one of the great landscape architects and urban planners in Canada at the end of the 19th Century" who had created a respectable image as a designer that will remain prominent in Canadian history over time.

Todd was designated a National Historic Person on October 21, 2020, on the recommendation of the national Historic Sites and Monuments Board.
