= Dan Hanganu =

Romanian-Canadian architect

- Born: January 27, 1939; Iași, Kingdom of Romania
- Died: October 5, 2017 (aged 78); Montreal, Quebec, Canada
- Education: Bucharest University of Architecture
- Occupation: Architect
- Awards: Order of Canada; National Order of Quebec; Prix Paul-Émile-Borduas; RAIC Gold Medal
- Buildings: Pointe-à-Callière Museum; HEC Montréal

Dan Sergiu Hanganu, CM OQ (January 27, 1939 – October 5, 2017) was a Romanian-born Canadian architect. Based in Montreal, Quebec, he designed a number of prominent Quebec buildings, including the new wing of the Pointe-à-Callière Museum, the HEC Montréal building, the concert Hall of Rimouski, the UQAM design school and several other mixed-use, commercial, residential and cultural buildings in Montreal, Europe and Asia. Hanganu was the recipient of an impressive list of awards and publications, including; the Order of Canada, the Governor General's award and was also awarded the RAIC gold medal in 2008 for lifetime achievement.

Dan Hanganu died on October 5, 2017, in Montreal, Quebec.

== Education and personal life ==
In 1961, Hanganu completed a degree in architecture at the Ion Mincu University of Architecture in Bucharest, and arrived in Canada in 1970. His wife Anca Hanganu who survives him is an architect practicing in Montreal.

== Career ==
Dan Hanganu led a diversified practice with projects ranging in scale from single-family houses to entire city blocks. His completed works include numerous housing projects of varying size and complexity, office buildings, hotels and resorts, multi-use complexes, institutional buildings, and several theatres.

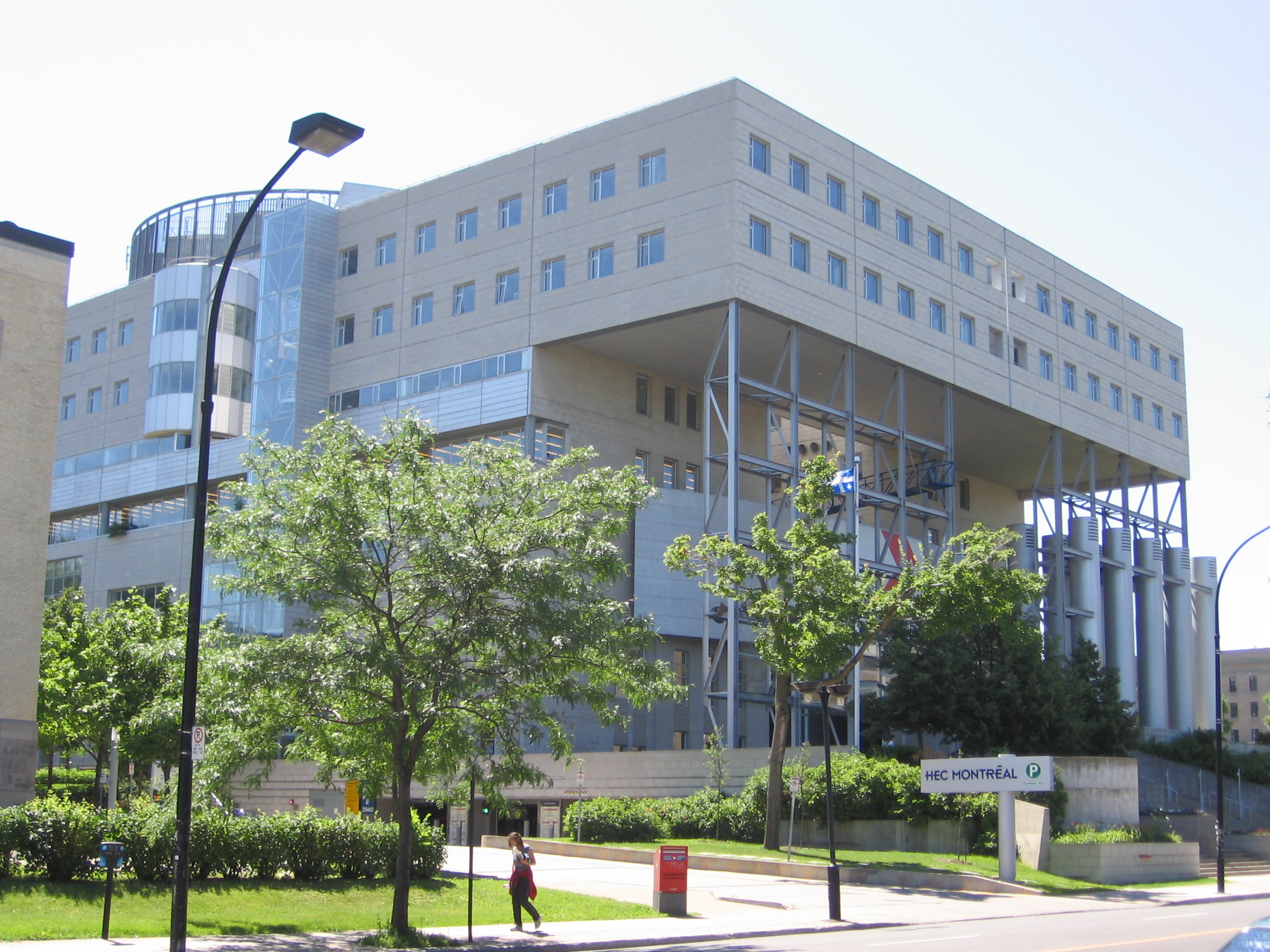
HEC Montréal

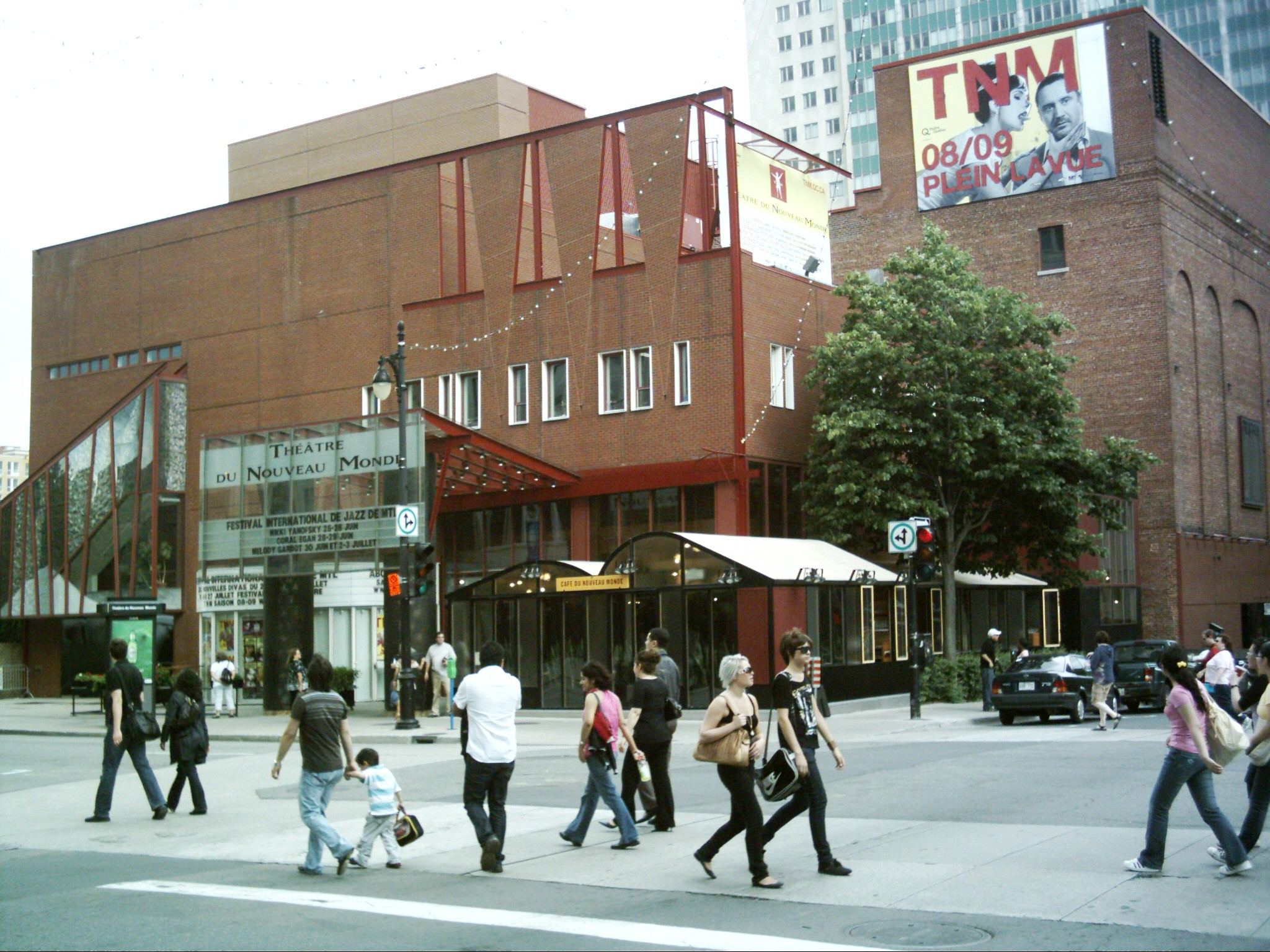
Théâtre du Nouveau Monde

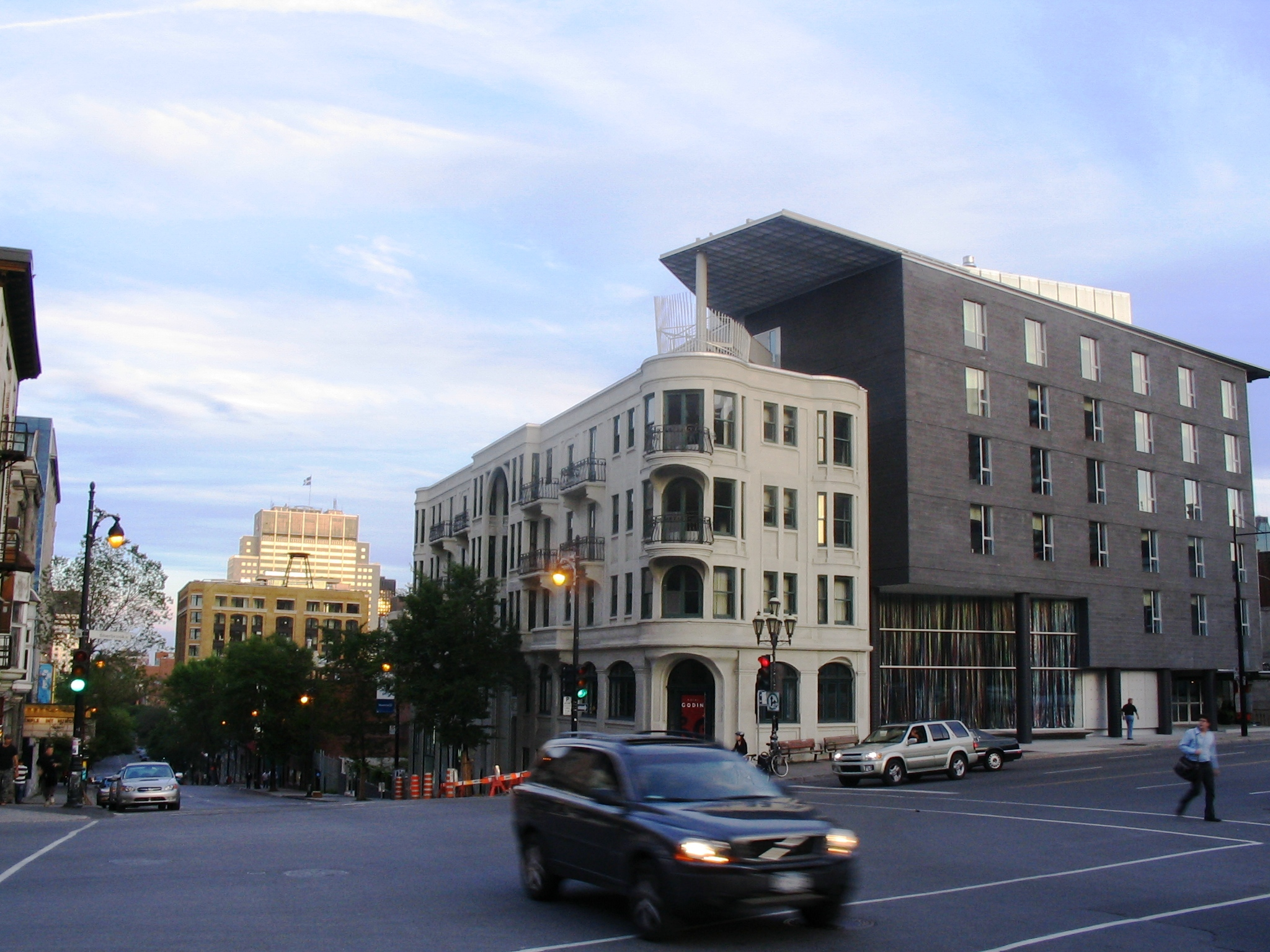
Hotel Godin, Hanganu's new building at right

== Recognition ==
Hanganu was personally recognized with the: Ordre national du Québec- officer (2005); Doctorat honoris causa en architecture from the Université Laval à Québec (2004); Prix Carrière Sam-Lapointe from the Institute of Design Montréal (2004); Doctorat honoris causa in architecture from the University of Bucharest (2003); Man of the year- Board of Trade of Metropolitan Montreal (1998) and with the Prix Paul-Émile Borduas (1992).

He received more than 50 Architectural Awards to his credit, many from the Royal Architectural Institute of Canada, the Ordre des architectes du Québec (OAQ) and from preservation organizations such as Sauvons Montréal.

His project highlights include the Pointe-à-Callière Museum, the Théâtre du Nouveau Monde, the Saint-Benoît-du-Lac Church, the UQAM Design Pavilion, the Cirque du Soleil studio, HEC Montréal, the Centre des arts Juliette-Lassonde, Hotel Godin, the Montréal Archival Centre, the Nahum Gelber Law Library of McGill University, l’Anglicane de Lévis, the Rimouski Arts Centre, and residential areas in Val de l’Anse.

When the call for entries for Canadian Museum for Human Rights in Winnipeg was made only 30 of the world's most prolific architects, including Rem Koolhaas, Frank Gehry, Zaha Hadid and others were invited. The Hanganu-Groupe ARCOP consortium went on to become one of the top three finalists in the competition, though the final design was awarded to American architect Antoine Predock.

He was given the RAIC Gold Medal which is awarded in recognition of significant contribution to Canadian architecture, and is the highest honour the profession of architecture in Canada can bestow. It recognizes an individual whose personal work has demonstrated exceptional excellence in the design and practice of architecture; and/or, whose work related to architecture, has demonstrated exceptional excellence in research or education.

In 2009, he was made a Member of the Order of Canada "for his contributions as an internationally renowned architect, and as a teacher and mentor". In 2005, he was made an Officer of the National Order of Quebec.

In 2016, Dan Hanganu became honorary citizen of his native city, Iași.
