= List of Quebec water channels =

The list of Quebec Water Channels aims to regroup all the artificial watercourses of Quebec and all the water channels constituting the seaway of the St. Lawrence River, in its Quebec part.

== Mauricie ==
- Mégiscane Canal

== Outaouais ==
- Carillon Canal

== Montérégie ==
- Chambly Canal
- Saint-Ours Canal

== Montreal region ==
- Aqueduct Canal
- Sainte-Anne-de-Bellevue Canal
- Lachine Canal
- Soulanges Canal

== St. Lawrence Seaway ==
- St. Lawrence Seaway
  - South Shore Canal
  - Beauharnois Canal

== See also ==
- List of rivers of Quebec
