= Pointe-à-Callière Museum =

Archaeology and history museum in Quebec, Canada

Pointe-à-Callière, Montreal Museum of Archaeology and History
- Pointe-à-Callière, Musée d'archéologie et d'histoire de Montréal
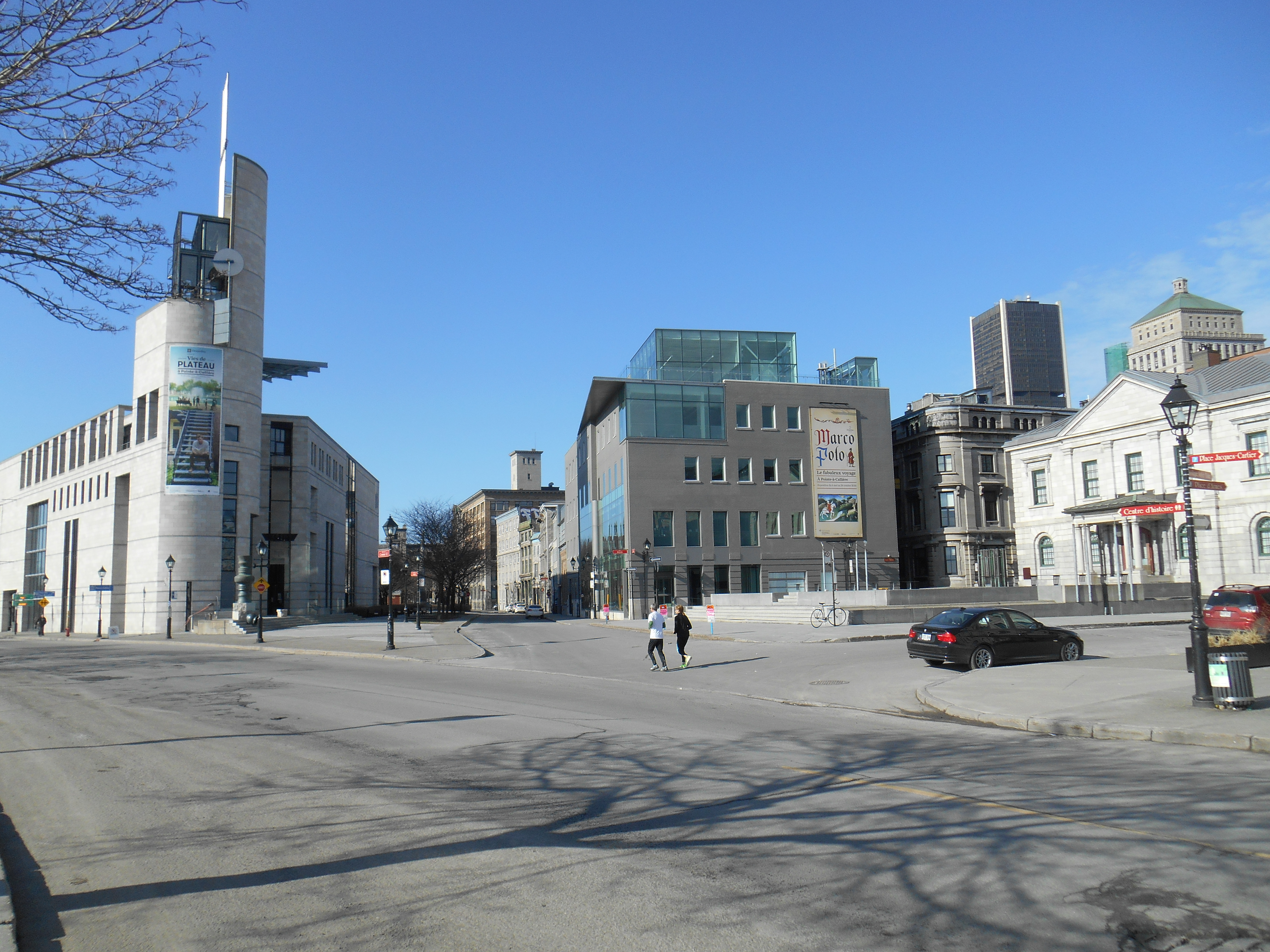
- View of the Pointe-à-Callière complex in 2014
- Interactive fullscreen map
- Established: 1992
- Location: Old Montreal, Ville-Marie, Montreal, Quebec, Canada
- Coordinates: 45°30′09″N 73°33′15″W
- Type: Archaeology and History museum
- Visitors: 353,503 (2011)
- Director: Francine Lelièvre
- Architect: Dan Hanganu
- Public transit access: at Place-d'Armes
- Website: pacmusee.qc.ca/en/

Pointe-à-Callière Museum (French: Musée Pointe-à-Callière, pronounced [myze pwɛ̃t a kaljɛʁ]) is a museum of archaeology and history in Old Montreal, Quebec, Canada. It was founded in 1992 as part of celebrations to mark Montreal's 350th birthday. The museum has collections of artifacts from the First Nations of the Montreal region that illustrate how various cultures coexisted and interacted, and how the French and British empires influenced the history of this territory over the years. The site of Pointe-à-Callière has been included in Montreal’s Birthplace National Historic Site since its designation in 1924.

It receives more than 350,000 visitors a year. Nearly 4.5 million people have come to the museum since it opened in 1992. It has received more than fifty national and international awards, including those in museography, architecture, and for cultural, educational and community activities. The museum is affiliated with: the Canadian Museums Association, the Canadian Heritage Information Network, and the Virtual Museum of Canada.

The museum complex comprises three archaeological sites: Pointe-à-Callière, Place Royale and 214 Place d'Youville; the archaeological field school at Fort Ville-Marie; Montreal's first Catholic cemetery; the William collector sewer; an archaeological crypt: Place Royale; a heritage building: the former Youville Pumping Station; 165-169 Place d’Youville, the Mariners House; and archaeological collections of over a million objects. The site of Pointe-à-Callière Museum main building site was once occupied by the Royal Insurance Building, which was also Montreal’s second Customs House from 1871 to 1917.

== History ==
The Pointe-à-Callière, Montréal Archaeology and History Complex opened in 1992. The original plan had been to open up the William collector sewer and the remains of St. Anne's Market and the Parliament of the United Province of Canada. Recent archaeological digs brought to light the remains of Fort Ville-Marie and of Governor Louis-Hector de Callière’s home, which are planned for display in a future expansion to expose the Little Saint-Pierre River canalized by the William sewer, and the archaeological remains of St. Anne's Market, home to the Parliament of the United Province of Canada between 1844 and 1849. Visitors will be led to a new exhibition hall, with its entrance on McGill Street, for future international exhibitions on ancient civilizations and their cultures.

In 1996 the museum held its first travelling exhibition, Water In, Waste Out, presented at the Musée de la civilisation (Quebec City) and the Musée et sites archéologiques Saint-Romain-en-Gal (Vienne, France). In 1997, at the Art and Archaeology exhibition twenty Montreal high school students were able to exhibit their works at the Musée et sites archéologiques Saint-Romain-en-Gal. 1690: The Siege of Québec... The Story of a Sunken Ship has travelled to different locations in Quebec and internationally since 2000. France / New France. Birth of a French People in North America, which has already been presented in the Maritimes, toured internationally. The museum also has an exhibition on underground Montreal as part of a cultural route in the underground pedestrian corridors of the Quartier international de Montréal.

== Museum complex ==
Building Montréal exhibit in Market Place

Where Montréal Began in Fort Ville-Marie

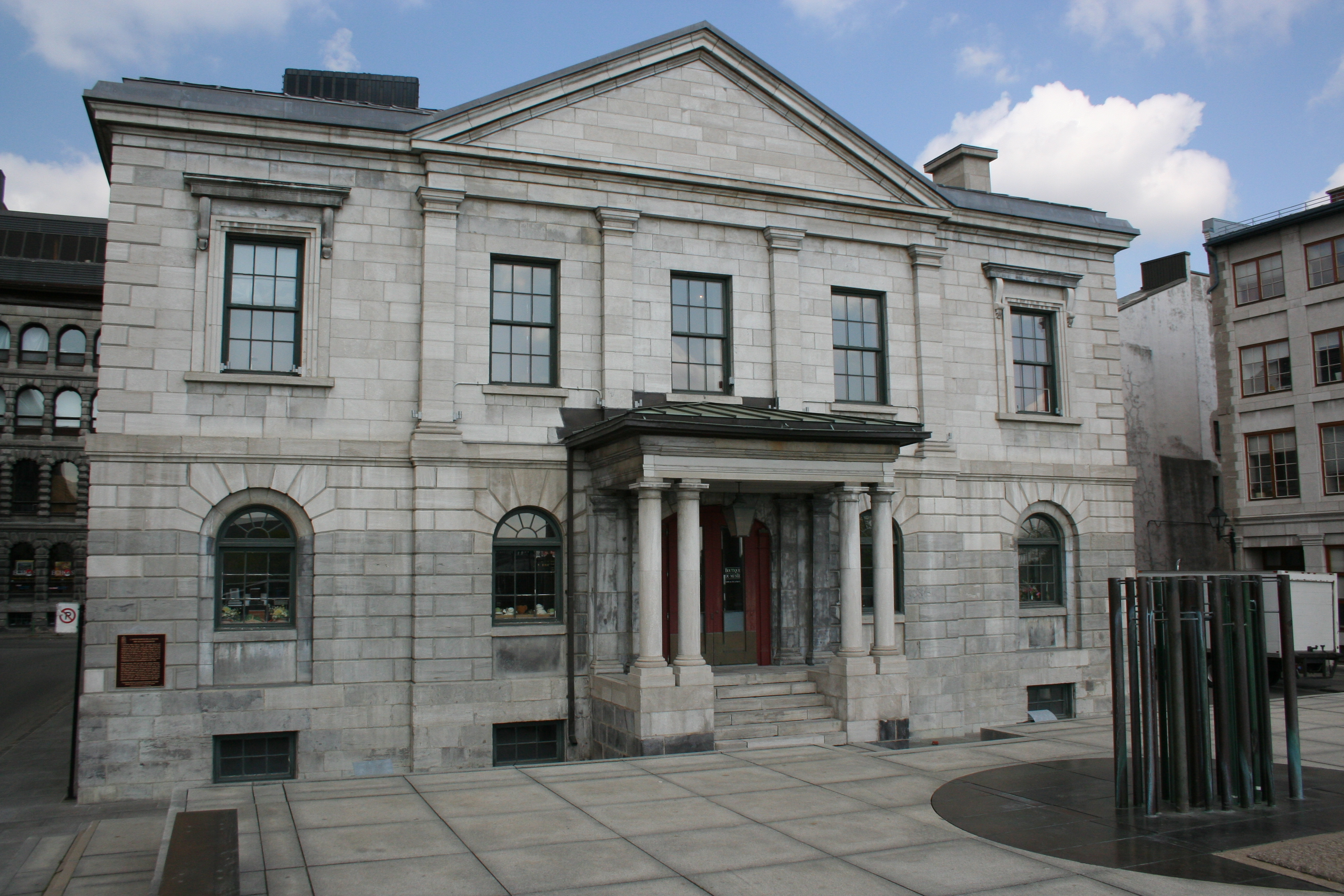
The museum complex includes the Old Custom House, Montreal's first custom house.

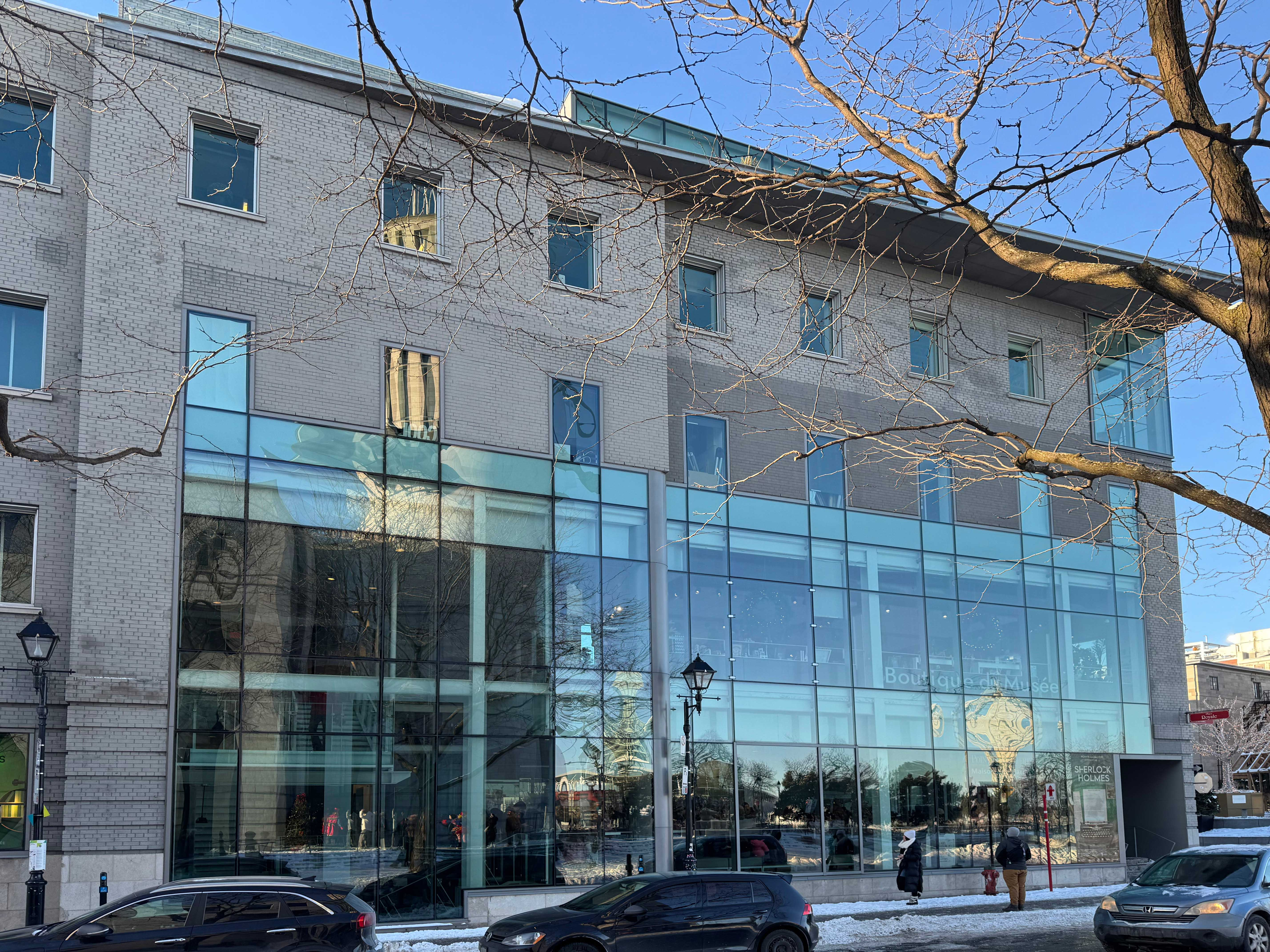
The Mariners' House (Maison-des-marins) is used for temporary exhibitions and the museum's gift shop.

The Pointe-à-Callière stands above several historic and archaeological sites of national significance, showcasing major periods in the history of Montreal. Some of the archaeological remains exposed during construction of the building has been left in situ as part of the museum's permanent display on the history of the city. The museum was constructed on pilings to preserve existing finds undisturbed and protected.

The main entrance of the museum, the L'Éperon building, rises above the point of land where Paul de Chomedey, Sieur de Maisonneuve, Jeanne Mance and other French settlers landed in 1642.

=== Complex components ===
- A: L'Éperon building
- B: First Collector sewer
- C: Fort Ville-Marie
- D: Market Place
- E: Old Custom House - built in 1836
- F: Mariners' House
Crossroads Montréal in L'Éperon building basement

Come Aboard! Pirates or Privateers in Old Custom House

Archaeo-Adventure in The Mariners' House basement

Multimedia Show Generations MTL

== Exhibits ==
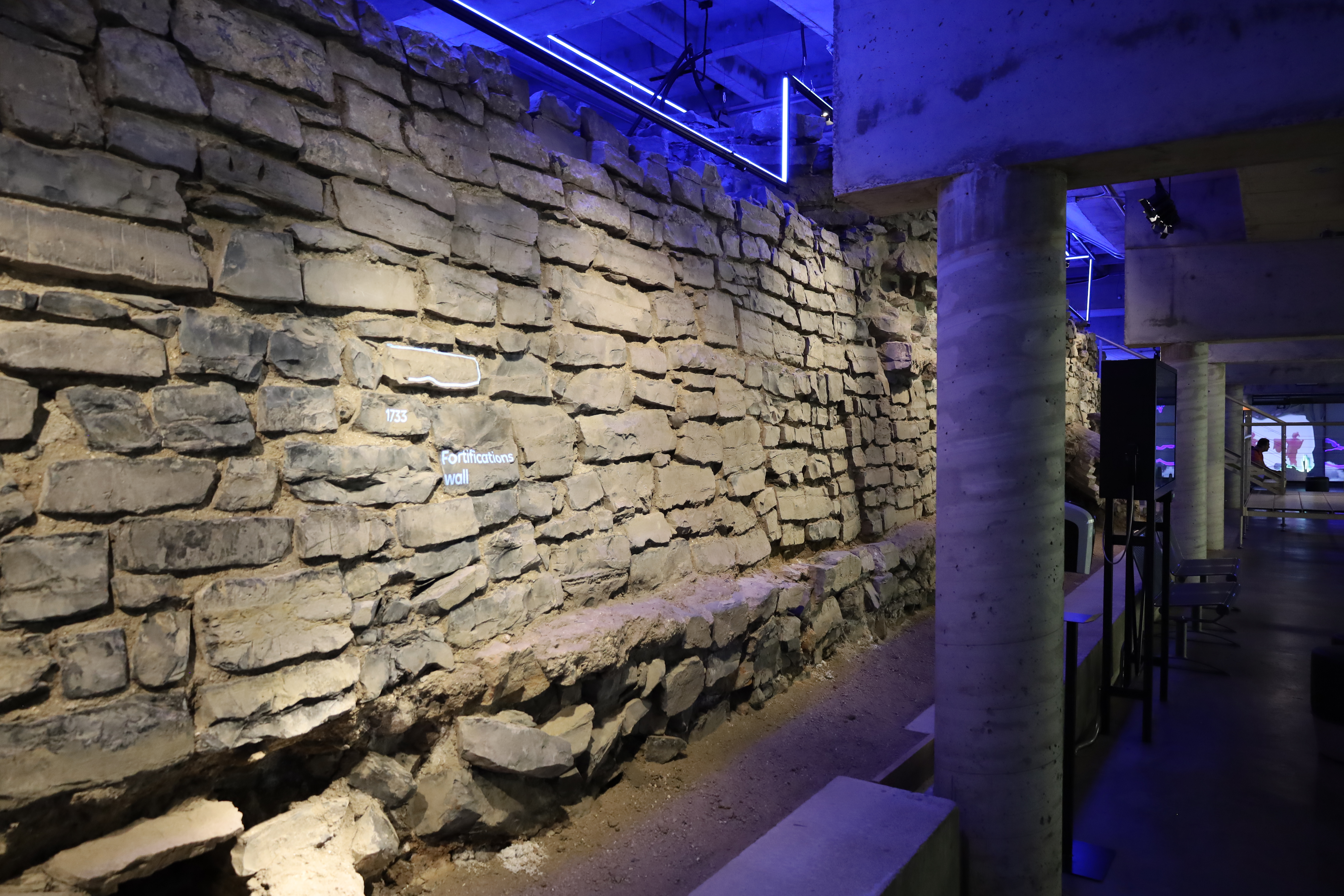
The museum's archaeological crypt features the architectural remains of Fort Ville-Marie.

The William Collector Sewer exhibition within Pointe-à-Callière

The museum displays archaeological remains from every period in the city's past, and the sites it protects have produced one of the largest archaeological collections in Canada. The museum's staff specialize in research, conservation, outreach activities and managing archaeology and history. In partnership with universities, it conducts research on the city's archaeology and history, and its ethnohistorical collections include artifacts and documents donated locally. The museum also displays exhibits on the city's built and industrial heritage.

Permanent exhibitions include 1701 - The Great Peace of Montréal, Archaeo-Adventure, Building Montréal, Crossroads Montréal, Memory Collector, Pirates or privateers?, Where Montréal Began, and Yours Truly, Montréal multimedia show.

Along with its permanent exhibitions, since it opened the museum has presented more than 70 temporary exhibitions on themes relating to local and international archaeology, history and heritage, culture and artistic creativity, and multiculturalism. Education and outreach programs and cultural activities are available for school groups and the general public on other aspects of archaeology and history. The museum also hosts musical performances, theatre and demonstrations, including lectures, debates and participation in Montreal, Quebec, cross-Canada and international events. The museum works with Native and cultural communities. For ceremonies commemorating the 300th anniversary of the 1701 Great Peace of Montreal in 2001, the museum’s main partners were aboriginal groups from Quebec, the rest of Canada and the United States.

=== Temporary exhibitions ===
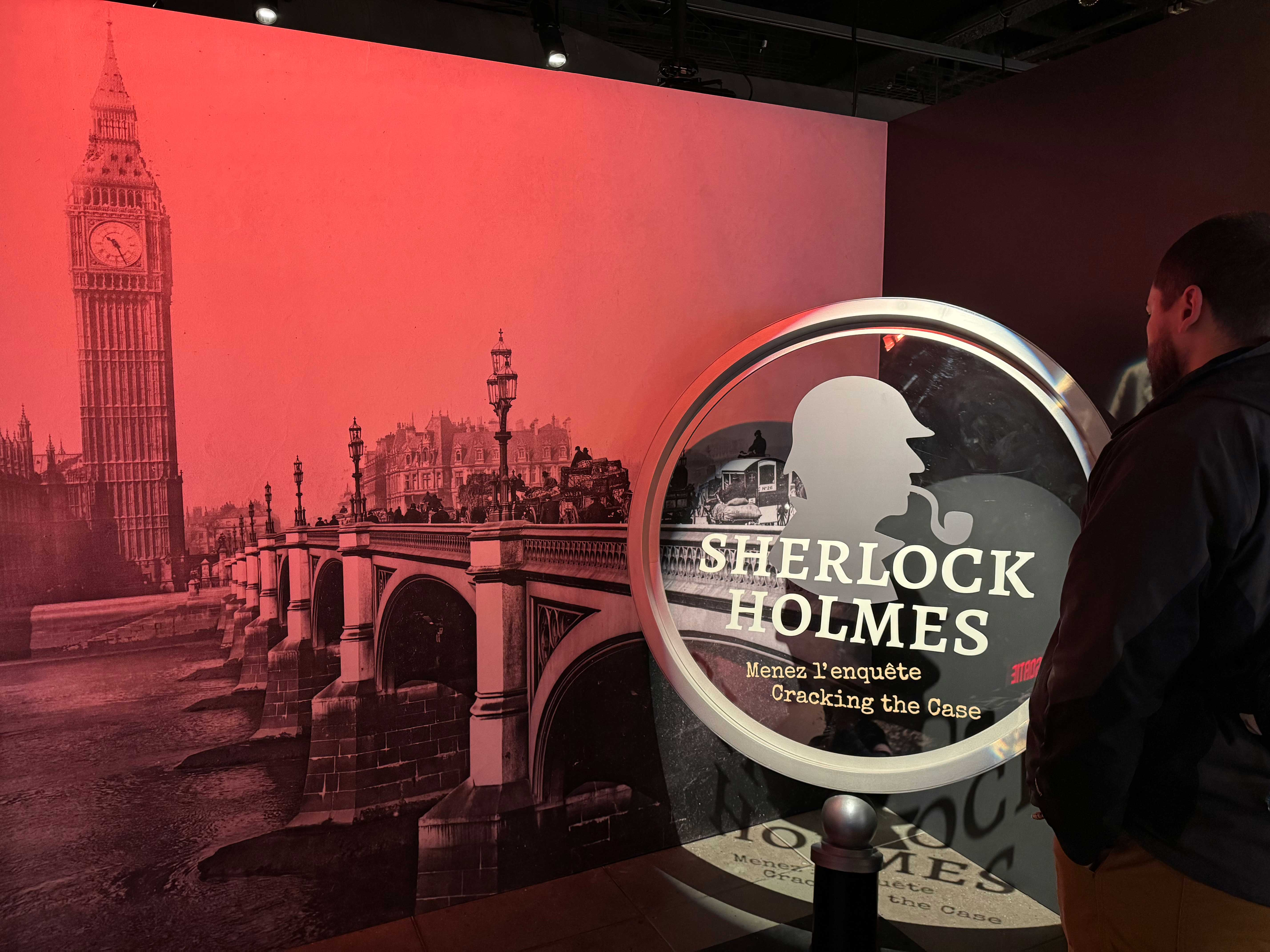
Pointe-à-Callière Temporary Exhibition on Sherlock Holmes

2025-2026

- Sherlock Holmes: Cracking the Case

2025

- Knights

2024-2025

- Witches – Out of the Shadows
- The Heart and Soul of Saint-Henri

2024

- Olmecs and the Civilizations of the Gulf of Mexico

2023-2024

- The St. Lawrence River, Echoes from the Shores

2023

- Egypt. Three Millennia on the Nile

2022-2024

- Favourites! Our Collections on Display

2022-2023

- Headdresses from around the World, The Antoine de Galbert Collection

2022

- Vikings – Dragons of the Northern Seas

2021-2022

- It's Circus Time!
- Italian Montréal

2020-2021

- The Hudson’s Bay Company – 350 Years of History

2019-2021

- Into the Wonder Room

2019-2020

- The Incas, Treasures of Peru

2019

- Dinner is Served! The Story of French Cuisine

2018-2019

- La Petite Vie

2018

- Ste-Ann's Market—Parliament of United Canada 1832 – 1849
- Queens of Egypt

2017-2019

- Hello, Montréal! Bell’s Historical Collections

2017-2018

- Passion: Hockey

2017

- Amazonia. The Shaman and the Mind of the Forest

2016-2017

- From the Lands of Asia
- Fragments of Humanity. Archaeology in Québec

2016

- Of Horses and Men — The Émile Hermès Collection, Paris

2015-2016

- Investigating Agatha Christie
- Snow

2015

- The Aztecs, People of the Sun

2014-2015

- The Greeks: Agamemnon to Alexander the Great

2014

- Marco Polo: An Epic Journey

2013-2014

- Lives and Times of the Plateau
- The Beatles in Montréal

2013

- The Tea Road

2012-2013

- Samurai: The Prestigious Collection of Richard Béliveau

2012

- The Etruscans: An Ancient Italian Civilization

2011-2012

- Colors of India

2011

- To Your Health, Cesar! Wine with the Gauls

2010-2011

- St.Catherine Street makes the Headlines

2010

- Easter Island: An Epic Voyage
- 100 years underground
- Discovering legends with Jean-Claude Dupont

2009-2010

- Pirates, Privateers and Freebooters;2008-2009
- Costa-Rica: Land of wonders!

2008

- France, New France: birth of a French people in North America

2007-2008

- 1837•1837, Rebellions, Patriotes vs Loyalists

2007

- First Nations, French Royal Collections

2006-2007

- St. Lawrence Iroquoians, Corn People

2006

- Japan

2005-2006

- Jules Verne, Writing the Sea

2005

- Encounters in Roman Gaul

2004-2005

- Old Montréal in a New Light

2004

- Oceania

2003-2004

- Dreams and Realities Along the Lachine Canal

2003

- Archaeology and the Bible – From King David to the Dead Sea Scrolls

2002-2003

- Varna – World's First Gold, Ancient Secrets
- A Collection from the Varna Museum, Bulgaria

2002

- Saint-Laurent, Montréal's "Main”

2001–2002

- Mysteries of the Moche of Peru

2001

- 1701 – The Great Peace of Montréal

2000–2001

- Africa Musica!
- Exploring a Collection from the Museo Pigorini

2000

- 1690: The Siege of Québec... The Story of a Sunken Ship

1999–2000

- Treasures from the South of Italy — Basilicata, Land of Light

1999

- Montréal, by Bridge and Crossing

1998–1999

- Art and Archaeology: Young Artists from Lyon at the Museum
- Treasures from the Ukrainian Steppes

1998

- The Ravages of Time: Restoring Heritage Objects from France
- Crucifixion: Unique Archaeological Evidence from Jerusalem

1997–1998

- Bannock, Baguette, Bagel – Montréal Bread

1997

- Abitibiwinni, 6,000 Years of History
- Art and Archaeology

1996–1997

- Ancient Cyprus: 8,000 Years of Civilization

1996

- Dream Merchants. The Emergence of Cinema in Quebec
- Water In, Waste Out. The History of Aqueducts, Water Mains and Sewers in Montréal

1995–1996

- Window Stories

1995

- The Port as Seen by Pierre Bourgault, Gilles Vigneault and Helmut Lipsky

1994–1995

- Bones and Bottles — Fragments of History

== See also ==
- Archaeology in Quebec
